= Electoral district VIII (Croatian Parliament) =

Electoral district of Croatian Parliament

- Constituency for the Croatian Parliament
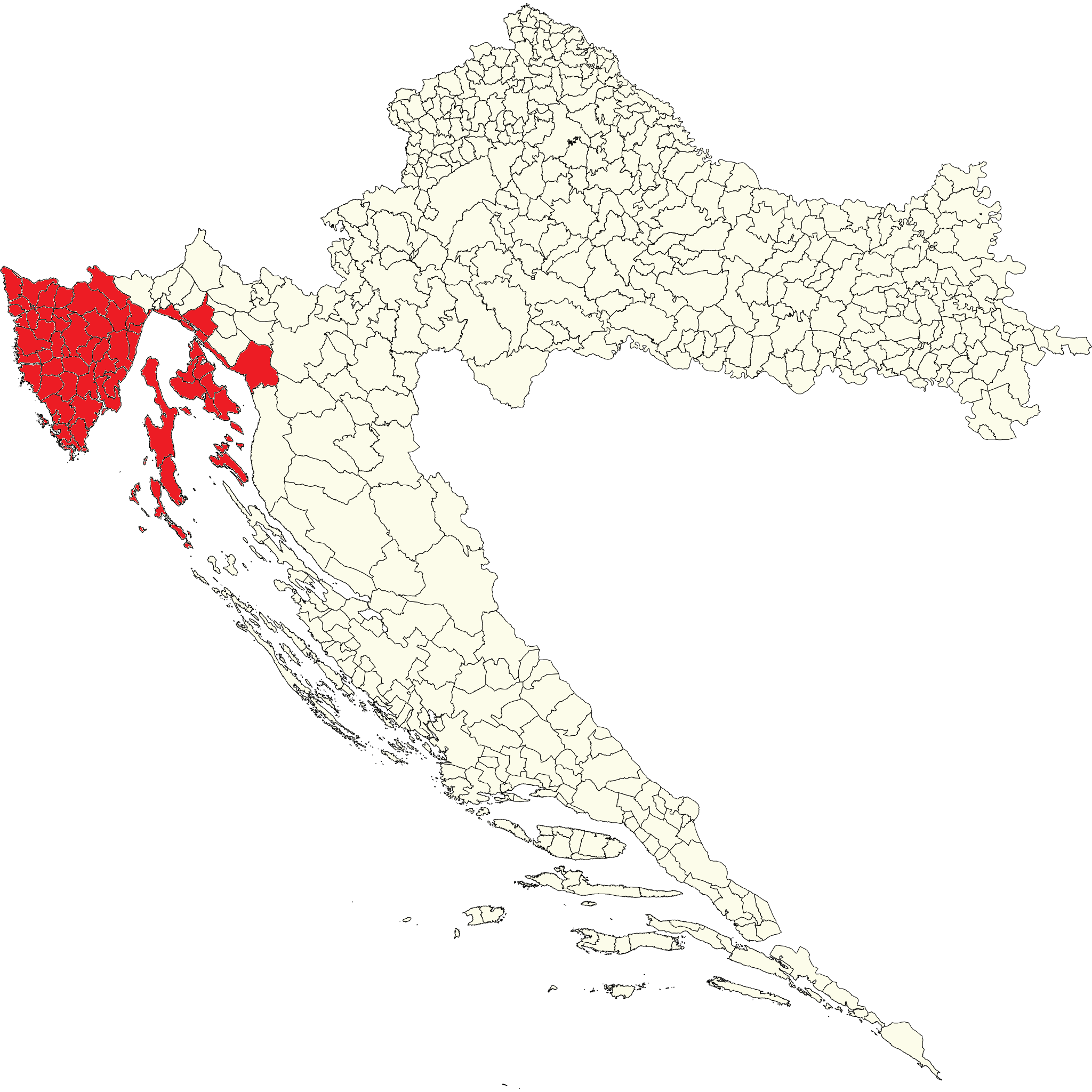
- Map of Electoral district VIII (2023-present)
- Electorate: 368,608 (2025)
- Major settlements: Rijeka, Opatija, Pula, Poreč, Rovinj, Umag, Labin, Pazin

Current constituency
- Created: 2023
- Number of members: 14

Electoral district VIII (Croatian: VIII. izborna jedinica) is one of twelve electoral districts of the Croatian Parliament. In 2025, the district had 368,608 registered voters.

== Boundaries ==
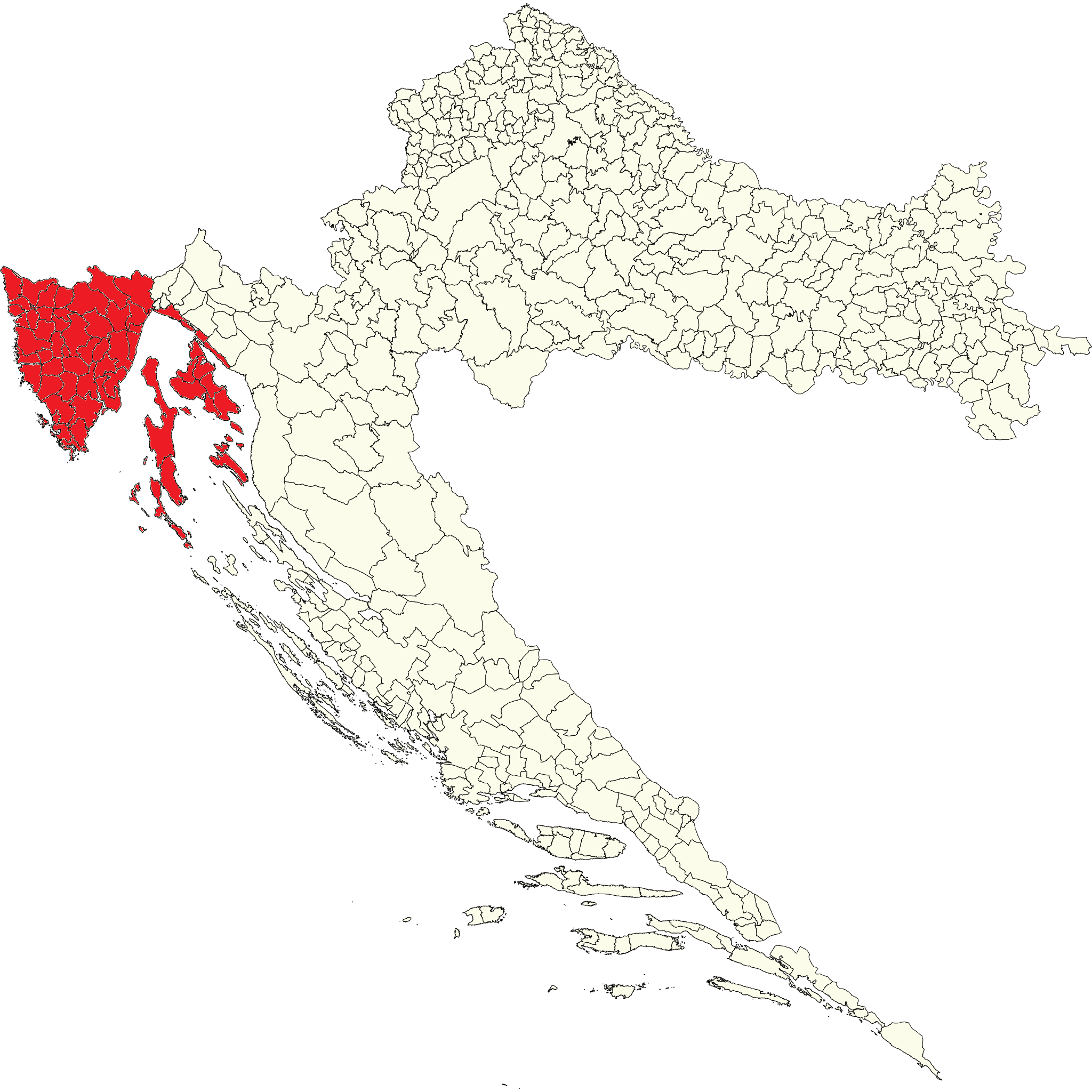
Electoral district VIII (1999-2023)

=== Creation ===
From 1999 to 2023, electoral district VIII consisted of:

- The whole Istria County;
- The western part of Primorje-Gorski Kotar County including the cities and municipalities: Baška, Cres, Crikvenica, Dobrinj, Kostrena, Kraljevica, Krk, Lovran, Mali Lošinj, Malinska - Dubašnica, Matulji, Mošćenička Draga, Omišalj, Opatija, Punat, Rab, Rijeka, Vrbnik.

=== 2023 revision ===
Under the 2023 revision, district boundaries were redrawn according to the suggestion of the Constitutional Court to compel a proportional number of voters.

The new district consists of:

- The whole Istria County:
- The western part of Primorje-Gorski Kotar County:
  - cities and municipalities: Bakar, Cres, Crikvenica, Kraljevica, Krk, Mali Lošinj, Novi Vinodolski, Opatija, Rab, Rijeka, Baška, Dobrinj, Kostrena, Lopar, Lovran, Malinska-Dubašnica, Mošćenička Draga, Omišalj, Punat and Vrbnik

== Representatives ==
The current representatives of the eighth electoral district in the Croatian Parliament are:

Name	Party	Deputizing
Mirela Ahmetović	SDP	
Maria Blažina	SDP	Peđa Grbin
Saša Đujić	SDP	
Zlatko Komadina	SDP	
Ana Puž Kukuljan	SDP	
Sanja Radolović	SDP	
Josip Borić	HDZ	Oleg Butković
Tomislav Klarić	HDZ	
Anton Kliman	HDZ	
Josip Ostrogović	HDZ	
Anteo Milos	IDS	Loris Peršurić
Dalibor Paus	IDS	
Marin Miletić	Most	
Dušica Radojčić	Možemo!	

== Elections ==
=== 2000 Elections ===
Party	Votes	%	Seats
SDP - HSLS - PGS	115.191	41.50	7
IDS - HSS - LS - HNS - ASH	85.876	30.94	5
HDZ	39.781	14.33	2
others	36.745	13.23	0
Total	277.593	100	14
Valid votes	277.593	98.39	
Invalid/blank votes	4.546	1.61	
Total votes	282.139	75.21	
Registered voters/turnout	375.114		
Source: Results Archived 2022-12-03 at the Wayback Machine

SDP - HSLS - PGS

- Slavko Linić
- Nikola Ivaniš
- Željko Glavan
- Drago Kraljević
- Jadranka Katarinčić-Škrlj
- Vladimir Šepčić
- Luciano Sušanj

IDS - HSS - LS - HNS - ASH

- Ivan Jakovčić
- Damir Kajin
- Valter Drandić
- Ante Simonić
- Petar Turčinović

HDZ

- Zlatko Mateša
- Nevio Šetić

=== 2003 Elections ===
Party	Votes	%	Seats	+/-
SDP - IDS	95.144	40.72	8	-1
HDZ	43.384	18.57	3	+1
HNS - PGS	26.861	11.50	2	0
HSU	11.869	5.08	1	+1
others	56.412	24.13	0	-1
Total	233.670	100	14	0
Valid votes	233.670	97.42		
Invalid/blank votes	6.181	2.58		
Total votes	239.851	64.02		
Registered voters/turnout	374.678			
Source: Results Archived 2022-12-03 at the Wayback Machine

SDP - IDS

- Damir Kajin
- Gordana Sobol
- Valter Drandić
- Biserka Perman
- Ivan Jakovčić
- Anton Peruško
- Dorotea Pešić-Bukovac
- Zdenko Antešić

HDZ

- Lino Červar
- Vladimir Vranković
- Nevio Šetić

HNS - PGS

- Miljenko Dorić
- Nikola Ivaniš

HSU

- Silvano Hrelja

=== 2007 Elections ===
Party	Votes	%	Seats	+/-
SDP	96.972	40.99	7	+2
HDZ	50.071	21.17	3	0
IDS	38.267	16.18	3	0
HSU	13.841	5.85	1	0
HNS	12.311	5.20	0	-2
others	25.107	10.61	0	0
Total	236.569	100	14	0
Valid votes	236.569	98.57		
Invalid/blank votes	3.429	1.43		
Total votes	239.998	62.24		
Registered voters/turnout	385.594			
Source: Results Archived 2022-12-03 at the Wayback Machine

SDP

- Zlatko Komadina
- Slavko Linić
- Dino Kozlevac
- Gordana Sobol
- Željko Jovanović
- Luka Denona
- Tanja Vrbat

HDZ

- Lino Červar
- Gari Cappelli
- Bojan Hlača

IDS

- Damir Kajin
- Ivan Jakovčić
- Boris Miletić

HSU

- Silvano Hrelja

=== 2011 Elections ===
Party	Votes	%	Seats	+/-
SDP - HNS - IDS - HSU	134.211	57.41	11	0
HDZ	28.403	12.51	2	-1
HL SR	13.375	5.72	1	+1
Ladonja	12.010	5.14	0	0
others	45.774	19.22	0	0
Total	233.773	100	14	0
Valid votes	233.773	98.36		
Invalid/blank votes	3.903	1.64		
Total votes	237.676	61.67		
Registered voters/turnout	385.376			
Source: Results Archived 2022-12-03 at the Wayback Machine

SDP - HNS - IDS - HSU

- Zlatko Komadina
- Damir Kajin
- Željko Jovanović
- Silvano Hrelja
- Romana Jerković
- Ivan Jakovčić
- Tanja Vrbat
- Nada Turina-Đurić
- Peđa Grbin
- Valter Boljunčić
- Ana Komparić Devčić

HDZ

- Davor Božinović
- Josip Borić

HL SR

- Nansi Tireli

=== 2015 Elections ===
Party	Votes	%	Seats	+/-
SDP - HNS - HSU - HL SR - A-HSS - ZS	80.467	37.71	7	-1
IDS - PGS - RI	42.193	19.77	3	0
HDZ - HSS - HSP AS - BUZ - HSLS - HRAST - HDS - ZDS	37.356	17.51	3	+1
Most	22.432	10.51	1	+1
ŽZ	11.013	5.61	0	0
others	19.924	8.89	0	-1
Total	213.385	100	14	0
Valid votes	213.385	98.21		
Invalid/blank votes	3.882	1.79		
Total votes	217.267	60.76		
Registered voters/turnout	357.567			
Source: Results

SDP - HNS - HSU - HL SR - A-HSS - ZS

- Zlatko Komadina
- Peđa Grbin
- Silvano Hrelja
- Nansi Tireli
- Ana Komparić Devčić
- Tanja Vrbat Grgić
- Dino Manestar

IDS - PGS - RI

- Boris Miletić
- Giovanni Sponza
- Tulio Demetlika

HDZ - HSS - HSP AS - BUZ - HSLS - HRAST - HDS - ZDS

- Oleg Butković
- Ivan Kirin
- Anton Kliman

Most

- Ines Strenja-Linić

=== 2016 Elections ===
Party	Votes	%	Seats	+/-
SDP - HNS - HSS - HSU	63.890	35.76	6	-1
IDS - PGS - RI	40.725	22.79	3	0
HDZ	35.753	20.01	3	0
ŽZ - PH - AM	13.669	7.65	1	+1
Most	11.588	6.48	1	0
others	13.034	7.31	0	0
Total	178.659	100	14	0
Valid votes	178.659	98.05		
Invalid/blank votes	3.545	1.95		
Total votes	182.204	51.65		
Registered voters/turnout	352.754			
Source: Results Archived 2021-12-04 at the Wayback Machine

SDP - HNS - HSS - HSU

- Željko Jovanović
- Peđa Grbin
- Silvano Hrelja
- Nada Turina-Đurić
- Romana Jerković
- Ana Komparić Devčić

IDS - PGS - RI

- Boris Miletić
- Giovanni Sponza
- Tulio Demetlika

HDZ

- Oleg Butković
- Ivan Kirin
- Anton Kliman

ŽZ - PH - AM

- Marin Škibola

Most

- Ines Strenja-Linić

=== 2020 Elections ===
Party	Votes	%	Seats	+/-
SDP - HSS - HSU - SNAGA - GLAS - IDS - PGS	68.808	44.53	8	-1
HDZ	34.794	22.51	4	+1
Možemo - NL - RF - ORAH - ZJN - ZG	13.130	8.49	1	+1
Most	8.999	5.82	1	0
others	28.787	18.65	0	-1
Total	154.518	100	14	0
Valid votes	154.518	97.65		
Invalid/blank votes	3.712	2.35		
Total votes	158.230	42.47		
Registered voters/turnout	372.573			
Source: Results

SDP - HSS - HSU - SNAGA - GLAS - IDS - PGS

- Peđa Grbin
- Erik Fabijanić
- Tulio Demetlika
- Silvano Hrelja
- Katarina Nemet
- Mirela Ahmetović
- Marin Lerotić
- Sanja Radolović

HDZ

- Oleg Butković
- Anton Kliman
- Gari Cappelli
- Ivan Kirin

Možemo - NL - RF - ORAH - ZJN - ZG

- Katarina Peović

Most

- Marin Miletić

=== 2024 Elections ===
Party	Votes	%	Seats	+/-
SDP - Centre - HSS - DO i SP - GLAS	68.577	33.36	6	0
HDZ - HSLS - HDS - HNS - HSU	43.744	21.28	4	0
IDS - PGS - UK - ISU - SD - NS R - D - HL SR	32.728	15.92	2	0
Možemo	21.062	10.24	1	0
Most - HS - HKS - NLM	11.754	5.71	1	0
others	27.653	13.49	0	0
Total	205.518	100	14	0
Valid votes	205.518	97.40		
Invalid/blank votes	5.484	2.60		
Total votes	211.002	59.28		
Registered voters/turnout	355.951			
Source: Results

SDP - Centre - HSS - DO i SP - GLAS

- Peđa Grbin
- Mirela Ahmetović
- Zlatko Komadina
- Sanja Radolović
- Saša Đujić
- Ana Puž Kukuljan

HDZ - HSLS - HDS - HNS - HSU

- Oleg Butković
- Anton Kliman
- Josip Ostrogović
- Tomislav Klarić

IDS - PGS - UK - ISU - SD - NS R - D - HL SR

- Dalibor Paus
- Loris Peršurić

Možemo

- Dušica Radojčić

Most - HS - HKS - NLM

- Marin Miletić
