= Amsterdam Coalition =

Electoral alliance in Croatia

Amsterdam Coalition Amsterdamska Koalicija
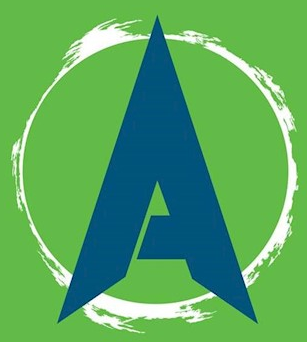
- Leader: Collective leadership
- Founded: 8 December 2018 (official)
- Dissolved: 6 March 2020
- Merged into: Restart Coalition
- Headquarters: Zagreb
- Ideology: Social liberalism Green politics Pro-Europeanism
- Political position: Centre to centre-left
- Slogan: "The face of a progressive Croatia"

The Amsterdam Coalition (Croatian: Amsterdamska koalicija) was an electoral alliance of centre-left and liberal political parties in Croatia.

== History ==
The alliance consisted of six parties - the Civic Liberal Alliance (GLAS), Istrian Democratic Assembly (IDS-DDI), Croatian Peasant Party (HSS), Alliance of Primorje-Gorski Kotar (PGS), Democrats and Croatian Labourists. It was formally formed on the 8 December 2018 when Anka Mrak-Taritaš (GLAS), Krešo Beljak (HSS) and Boris Miletić (IDS-DDI) signed a coalition agreement for the 2019 European Parliament election in Croatia. On 23 February 2019, the Coalition presented their list of 12 candidates for the 2019 European Parliament election, headed by Valter Flego of the IDS.

The coalition stated in their programme that they "fight for a progressive, free and prosperous Croatia", while also "opposing intolerance, incompetence and primitivism".

The term "Amsterdam Coalition" first started appearing in Croatian media at the end of 2017, after GLAS and Pametno joined the Alliance of Liberals and Democrats for Europe Party, a transnational European political party, in Amsterdam. Pametno left the coalition in August 2018, after disagreements concerning the Uljanik shipbuilding company. After the 2019 European Parliament election, the Croatian Party of Pensioners (HSU) announced that they are leaving the alliance and joining the Social Democratic Party of Croatia for the 2020 parliamentary election. GLAS President Anka Mrak-Taritaš confirmed in March 2020 that the coalition doesn't exist anymore.

== Members ==
Party name	Abbr.	Leader	Ideology	MPs (2018–20)	Member
Civic Liberal Alliance	GLAS	Anka Mrak-Taritaš	Social liberalism	4 / 151	2018–2020
Croatian Peasant Party	HSS	Hrvoje Duvnjak	Agrarianism; Liberalism	4 / 151	2018–2019
Istrian Democratic Assembly	IDS-DDI	Boris Miletić	Regionalism; Social liberalism	3 / 151	2018–2020
Croatian Party of Pensioners	HSU	Silvano Hrelja	Single-issue politics (Rights of pensioners)	1 / 151	2018–2019
Democrats	Dem.	Mirando Mrsić	Social democracy Social liberalism	1 / 151	2019–2020
Alliance of Primorje-Gorski Kotar	PGS	Darijo Vasilić	Regionalism; Liberalism	0 / 151	2018–2020
Croatian Labourists – Labour Party	Laburisti	David Bregovac	Social democracy Democratic socialism	0 / 151	2019–2020

== Electoral performance ==
=== European Parliament ===
Election year	Rank	Ballot carrier	Popular votes	% of popular votes	Overall seats won	Affiliation
2019	6th	Valter Flego (IDS-DDI)	55,806	5.19%	1 / 12	ALDE (Renew Europe)
