= 2019 European Parliament election in Croatia =

- 26 May 2019

All 12 Croatian seats in the European Parliament
- Turnout: 29.85% (▲4.61 pp)
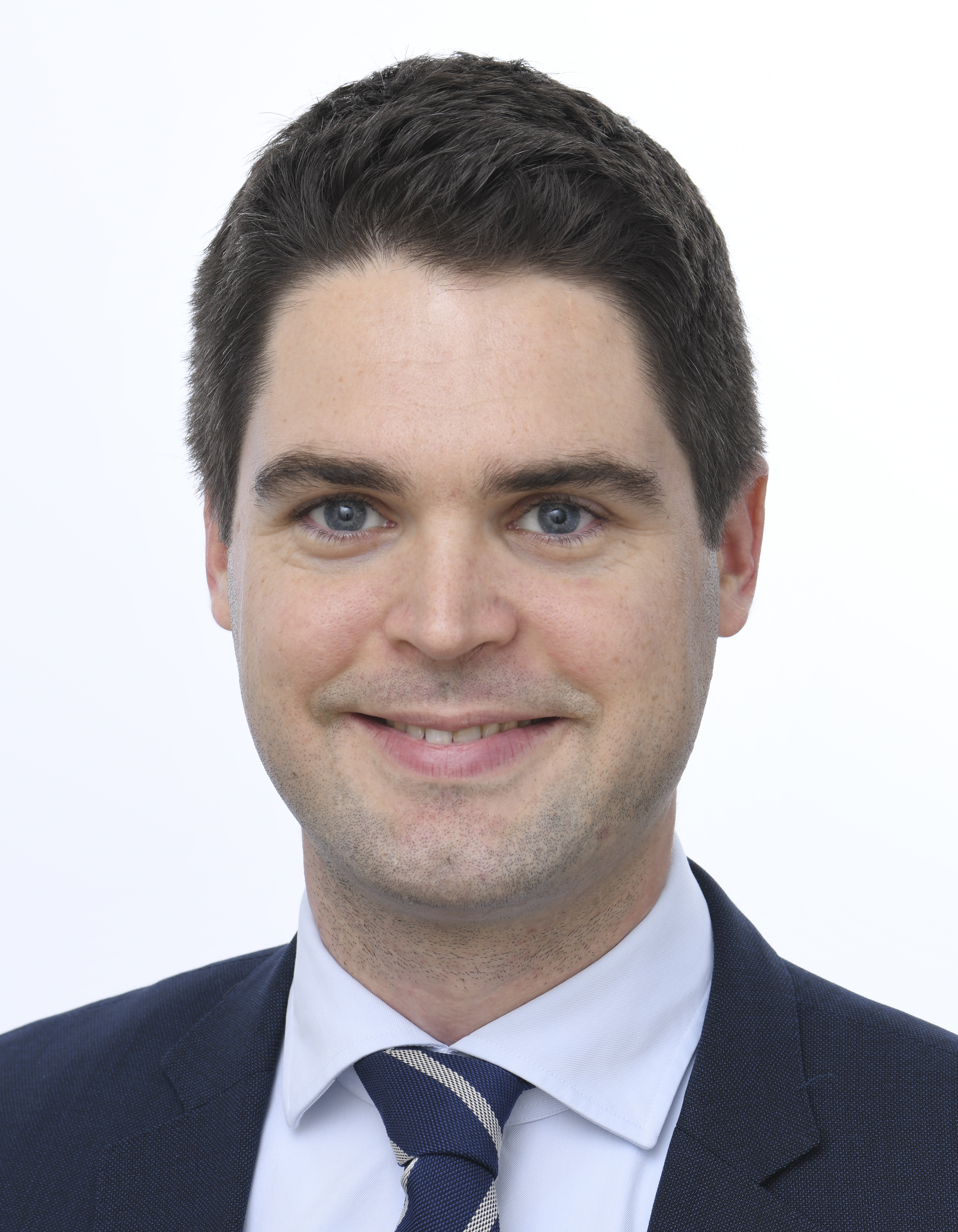

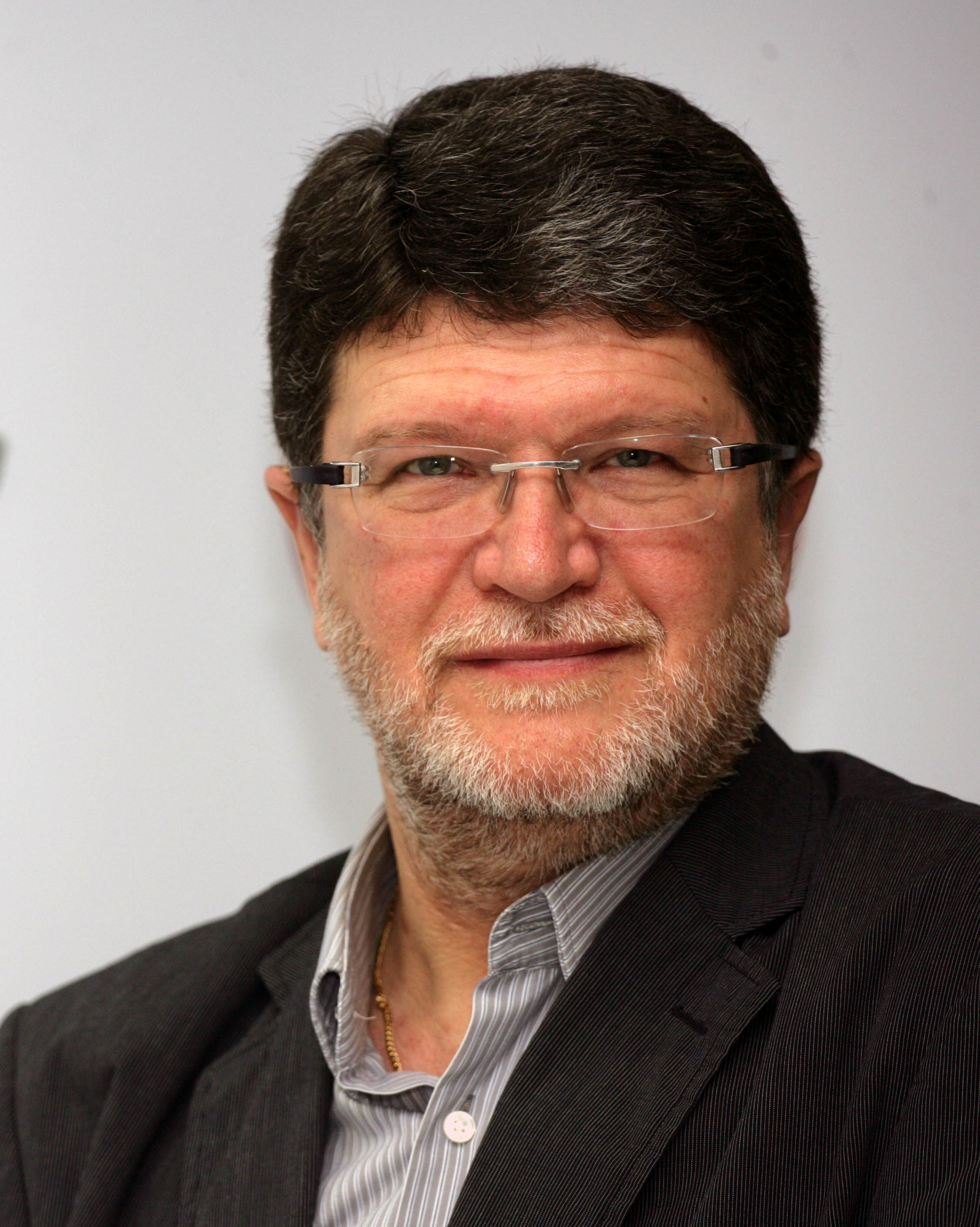

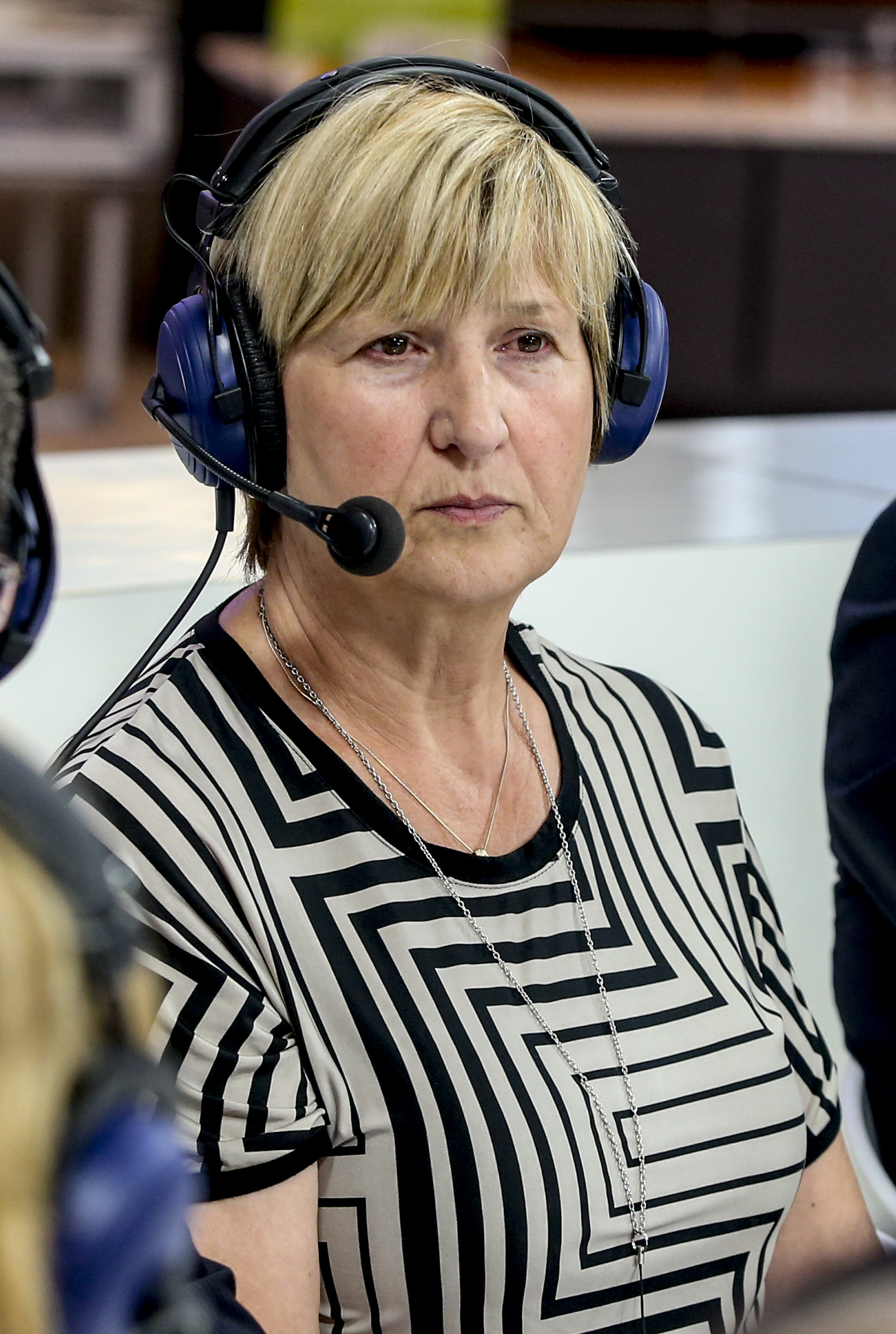

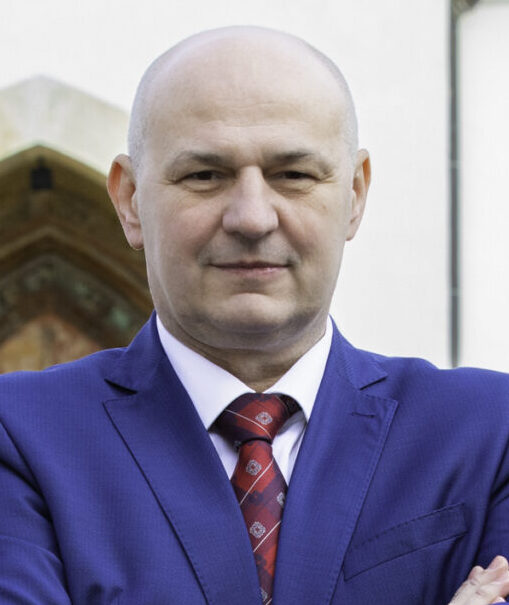

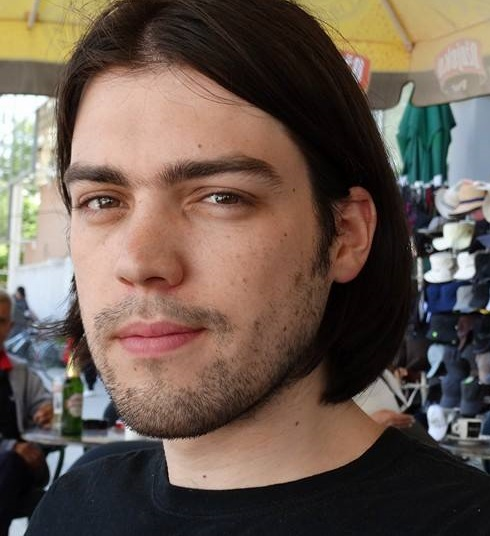

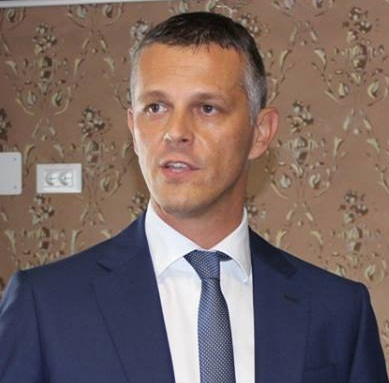
	First party	Second party	Third party
Leader	Karlo Ressler	Tonino Picula	Ruža Tomašić
Party	HDZ	SDP	HRAST–HKS–HSP AS–UHD
Alliance	EPP	S&D	ECR-ECPM
Last election	4 seats	2 seats	0 seats
Seats won	4	4	1
Seat change	Steady	▲2	▲1
Popular vote	244,076	200,976	91,546
Percentage	22.73%	18.71%	8.52%
	Fourth party	Fifth party	Sixth party
Leader	Mislav Kolakušić	Ivan Sinčić	Valter Flego
Party	Independent	Human Shield	Amsterdam Coalition
Alliance	NI	NI	ALDE
Last election	–	0 seats	2 seats
Seats won	1	1	1
Seat change	New	▲1	▼1
Popular vote	84,765	60,847	55,806
Percentage	7.89%	5.67%	5.20%
Swing	New
- HDZ SDP Sovereignists Amsterdam Coalition Živi zid Most HNS–LD NL Marijana Petir SDSS NS–R BM 365 Pametno

European Parliament elections were held in Croatia on 26 May 2019, electing members of the national Croatia constituency to the European Parliament. These were the third such elections in the country since its accession to the European Union in 2013.

It was the first election to be held nationally since the 2016 parliamentary election, following which the center-right HDZ had formed a coalition government, first with the center-right MOST and later - in June 2017, with the centrist HNS. The European Parliament elections were therefore viewed as a major test for the center-left SDP, which had contested all previous nationwide elections since 2011 as part of a coalition, but chose to stand in this election alone. The elections as such was deemed important to showcase whether the SDP could remain the largest opposition party, having been faced with months of falling opinion poll ratings. Its main contenders for such a position within the political system were the anti-establishment, eurosceptic Živi zid party, and the newly formed center-left Amsterdam Coalition.

The election resulted in the two largest parties in the country, the ruling centre-right HDZ, and the opposition centre-left SDP, winning an equal number of seats - each taking 4. SDP won in all four of the largest Croatian cities: Zagreb, Split, Rijeka and Osijek. The remaining four seats were evenly divided between the right-wing Croatian Sovereignists coalition, the centre-left Amsterdam Coalition, the anti-establishment Živi zid party and the independent list led by jurist Mislav Kolakušić. The strong performance of right-wing and far-right parties, such as the Croatian Sovereignists coalition and Independents for Croatia-HSP coalition, is thought to have greatly contributed to the surprisingly poor result of the HDZ, notably by significantly reducing its support among members of the Croatian diaspora, who had registered a record turnout in this election. Another surprise in the elections was the large number of votes received by Zagreb jurist Mislav Kolakušić and his independent list - which was something not predicted by opinion polls, as well as the failures of MOST to attain a seat and of independent incumbent MEP Marijana Petir to retain her seat (which she had held since 2014).

At the previous election in 2014, Croatia was allocated 11 seats and is set to receive one additional seat following the withdrawal of the United Kingdom from the EU. All seats were up for election and the whole country forms a single constituency, with the 12 members elected by proportional representation using open lists and the D'Hondt method.

== Current delegation ==
Croatian parties in the European Parliament in the ninth legislature (2019-2024)
Group	12	National party	12
EPP Group	4	Croatian Democratic Union (HDZ)	4
S&D	4	Social Democratic Party (SDP)	4
ALDE	1	Istrian Democratic Assembly (IDS-DDI)	1
ECR	1	Croatian Conservative Party (HKS)	1
NI	1	Mislav Kolakušić (ind.)	1
EFDD	1	Živi zid (ŽZ)	1

== Campaign ==
A total of 33 valid candidate slates with 396 candidates were submitted for the upcoming European Parliament election. The lists were published by the State Election Commission on 10 April, when the official election campaign began that will last for 45 days.

=== Croatian Democratic Union ===
The slate of the Croatian Democratic Union (HDZ), the ruling centre-right party of Croatia and member of the European People's Party (EPP), was led by 30-year-old Karlo Ressler, who was nominated by the youth branch of the party. The slate also includes two current MEPs, three members of the Croatian Parliament, and two county prefects. The party platform for the election was called "Croatia for Generations". Croatian Prime Minister and HDZ President Andrej Plenković said that the election is a choice between a political course of Croatia's development and a backward course that would isolate Croatia. The main campaign rally of the HDZ, held in Zagreb, was attended by German Chancellor Angela Merkel and Manfred Weber, EPP's candidate for European Commission (EC) President. Both of them urged voters to reject nationalism in the upcoming election.

=== Social Democratic Party of Croatia ===
The slate of the main opposition party, the centre-left Social Democratic Party of Croatia (SDP) of the Party of European Socialists (PES), was led by current MEP Tonino Picula. While presenting the party list, Picula said that Croatia had not taken full advantage of its membership in the EU. The SDP was expecting to win three seats in the upcoming election. The campaign event in Rijeka, where the SDP is in power, was attended by Frans Timmermans, the candidate of the PES for president of the EC, alongside SDP President Davor Bernardić. Bernardić accused the HDZ for "failing to salvage" the Croatian shipyards in Rijeka and Pula, in cooperation with the EC.

=== Amsterdam Coalition ===
The list of the Amsterdam Coalition, a coalition of seven parties, including the Croatian Peasant Party (HSS), the Civic Liberal Alliance (GLAS), and the Istrian Democratic Assembly (IDS), was headed by Istria County prefect Valter Flego of the IDS. GLAS President Anka Mrak Taritaš presented the list as a rejection of a "Europe of barbed wire fences and the Brexit chaos", and said that the coalition advocates an open and free Europe. HSS President Krešo Beljak said that the vote for the coalition is a vote for a European Croatia.

=== Živi zid ===
The populist Živi zid party announced a joint platform with Italy's Five Star Movement, Kukiz'15 from Poland, and Greece's AKKEL. The 1st candidate on the slate of the Živi zid was its secretary-general Tihomir Lukanić. Ivan Vilibor Sinčić, the president of the party, presented the platform as a new generation of politicians that will fight against corruption and organised crime.

=== Bridge of Independent Lists ===
The slate of the Bridge of Independent Lists (Most) was led by its president, Božo Petrov. If elected, Petrov would have given up his seat in the European Parliament to the next candidate with most preferential votes. Prior to the start of the campaign, the Most party attempted to filibuster a bill that would increase the spending limits for the European election, but the bill was passed by the Croatian Parliament just before the deadline. The party has not joined any of the European political groups and announced the work within the non-affiliated Non-Inscrits.

=== Independents for Croatia–Croatian Party of Rights ===
Two right-wing parties, the Independents for Croatia (NHR) and the Croatian Party of Rights (HSP), formed a coalition and emphasized a Europe of "free, sovereign and independent nations" as the main agenda. Their slate included both parties' presidents, Bruna Esih of the NHR and Karlo Starčević of the HSP.

=== Croatian Sovereignists ===
The Croatian Sovereignists coalition was formed by four right-wing parties: the Croatian Conservative Party (HKS), the Croatian Growth (Hrast), the Croatian Party of Rights Dr. Ante Starčević (HSP AS), and the United Croatian Patriots (UHD). Its list was led by current MEP Ruža Tomašić of the HKS, who won a mandate in 2013 and in 2014 on the HDZ-led Patriotic Coalition slate.

=== Independent Democratic Serb Party ===
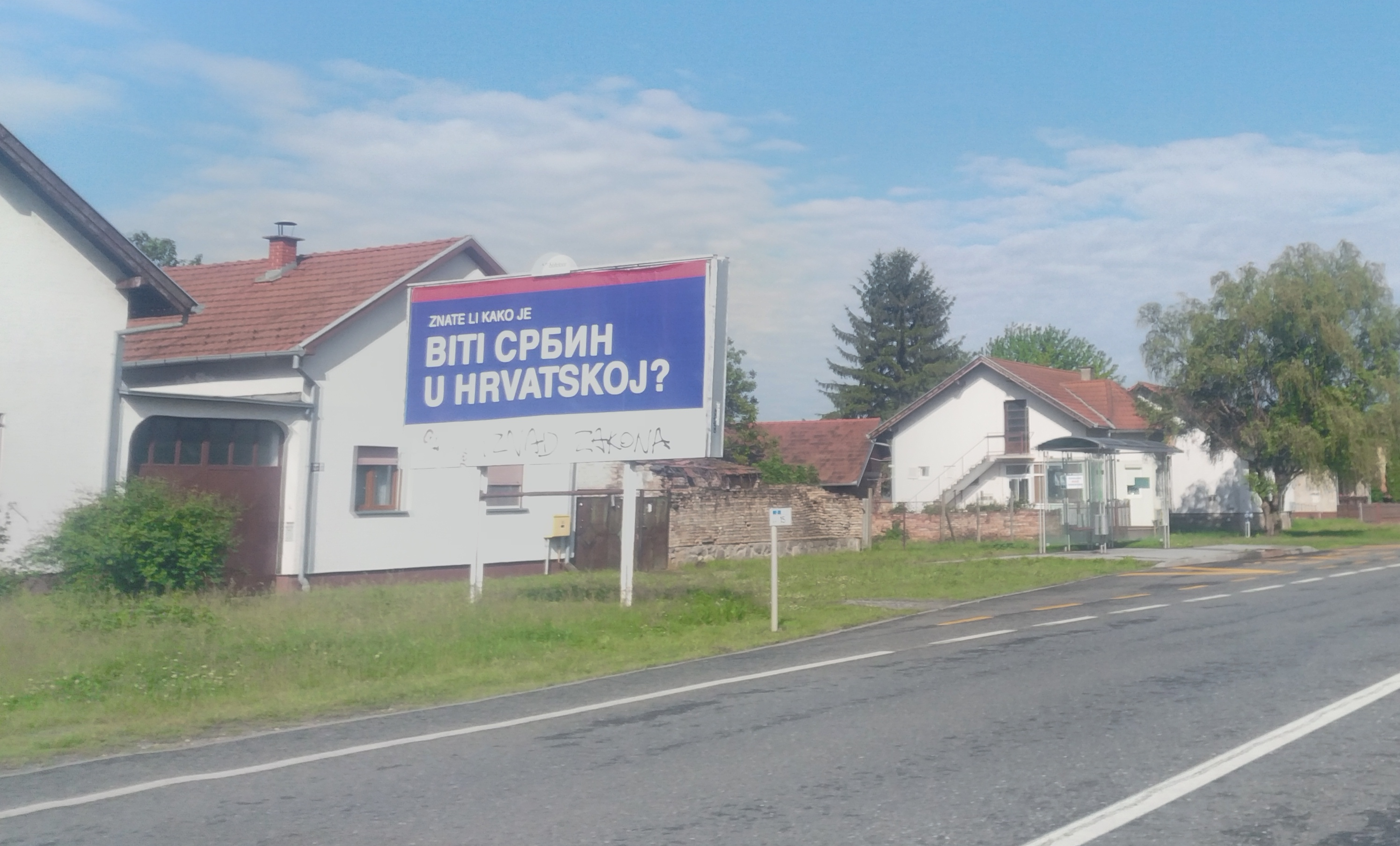
SDSS' 2019 European Parliament election jumbo poster in Vukovar.

The Independent Democratic Serb Party (SDSS), the largest party of the Serbs of Croatia, ran independently for the first time in the European election. Although there were speculations that the SDSS might leave the ruling coalition, its leader Milorad Pupovac confirmed that the SDSS will remain a part it, following a meeting with Prime Minister Plenković. Campaign was marked by SDSS jumbo posters with inscription "Do you know how it is to be a Serb in Croatia?" in which a word Serb was written in Serbian Cyrillic. Second on the list, just behind party leader Milorad Pupovac, was Dejan Jović, university professor and former consultant to Ivo Josipović. As it was expected by campaign leaders jumbo posters were target of widespread nationalist vandalism and destruction which underlined the issue of ethnic intolerance and discrimination.

=== Other electoral lists ===
The Croatian People's Party – Liberal Democrats (HNS–LD), the junior partner in the governing coalition, also ran independently, with Međimurje County Prefect Matija Posavec leading the list.

Current MEP Marijana Petir, who was elected in 2014 on the HDZ-led coalition slate, ran as an independent candidate, with a campaign focused on agrarian issues.

== Opinion polls ==
The following graph depicts the evolution of standings of the two main political parties and other parties in the poll since the parliamentary elections 2003.

Polling average
- Main parties
- HDZ
- SDP
- Other parties
- ŽZ
- A
- MOST
- BM365
- HNS
- NHR-HSP
- START
- HS
- NLMK
- NLMP
- Pametno
- Events
- Elections

=== Vote share ===
Date	Polling firm	Sample size	TO	HDZ	SDP	ŽZ	A	Most	BM 365	HNS	NHR HSP	Start	HS	NLMK	NLMP	Pametno	Others	Lead
25 May 2014	Election results		25.24%	41.4	29.9	0.5	—N/a	—N/a	—N/a	—N/a	—N/a	—N/a	—N/a	—N/a	—N/a	—N/a	28.2	11.5
23 Nov 2018	2x1 komunikacije	--	--	25.5	18.5	7.8	13.1	7.8	--	1.2	7.6	--	1.0	--	--	--		7.0
27 Dec 2018	2x1 komunikacije	1046	--	28.4	22.8	12.0	10.6	6.6	--	1.6	6.6	--	1.0	--	--	--		5.6
18 Jan 2019	IPSOS	1000	--	20.1	10.6	10.8	12.5	7.5	5.1	0.2	8.9	9.4	--	--	--	--		7.6
1 Feb 2019	2x1 komunikacije	--	--	26.4	22.0	10.5	14.0	6.8	--	1.4	8.6	--	2.2	--	--	--		4.4
27 Feb 2019	IPSOS	991	--	29.6	15.7	9.4	7.2	4.9	5.0	--	--	4.0	--	--	--	--	16.0	13.9
28 Feb 2019	2x1 komunikacije	--	--	26.3	20.0	9.9	14.1	8.7	--	1.5	7.5	--	1.7	--	--	--		6.3
6 Mar 2019	Promocija plus	1300	--	27.6	16.7	9.6	8.2	6.5	4.0	2.5	4.2	4.0	2.9	--	--	--		10.9
21 Mar 2019	Promocija plus	1400	--	27.0	16.4	9.3	8.4	6.4	3.6	2.3	4.3	4.1	2.8	--	--	--	1.6	10.6
23 Mar 2019	2x1 komunikacije	--	--	26.6	20.8	10.5	14.4	8.8	--	2.6	6.2	--	1.5	--	--	--		5.8
26 Mar 2019	IPSOS	983	--	29.5	18.9	9.4	5.6	6.1	4.0	--	--	4.1	--	--	--	--	16.6	10.6
7 Apr 2019	Promocija plus	1300	--	26.9	16.5	8.3	8.2	6.0	--	--	4.5	4.0	4.0	--	--	--		10.4
21 Apr 2019	Promocija plus	1400	--	25.1	15.7	7.7	7.6	6.2	2.4	2.4	4.1	3.2	3.9	4.6	4.6	--	2.4	9.4
27 Apr 2019	IPSOS	841	--	26.9	17.4	8.7	7.1	6.0	3.1	--	2.8	3.9	2.7	2.8	2.7	--	7.0	9.5
29 Apr 2019	Oraclum	1200	--	36.1	20.5	9.7	6.0	7.4	2.2	1.2	2.9	3.4	2.4	3.2	-	--	2.3	15.6
30 Apr 2019	2x1 komunikacije	--	--	24.0	21.0	9.8	7.9	6.8	1.0	1.0	5.0	2.0	2.7	3.2	2.5	--	1.2	3.0
8 May 2019	Promocija plus	1300	--	26.0	16.2	7.9	7.0	5.6	3.3	--	3.4	--	3.1	4.3	4.4	--	--	9.8
20 May 2019	Promocija plus	1400	--	24.5	16.4	7.4	6.9	6.7	2.3	3.1	3.6	2.2	4.4	4.7	4.8	2.0	4.4	8.1
23 May 2019	2x1 komunikacije	1041	--	24.0	21.2	11.0	5.9	7.0	2.6	1.7	5.3	3.1	4.8	4.8	4.0	--		2.8
24 May 2019	Oraclum	--	--	34.6	21.1	11.1	5.7	7.3	2.8	1.2	2.4	3.1	2.2	3.3	--	1.2		13.5
24 May 2019	IPSOS	985	--	28.2	20.1	7.4	6.2	6.1	3.0	--	4.6	3.0	4.2	5.1	--	--		8.1

=== Seat projections ===
Date	Polling firm	Sample size	Abs.	HDZ	SDP	ŽZ	A	Most	BM 365	HNS	NHR HSP	Start	HS	NLMK	NLMP	Others	Lead
23 Nov 2018	2x1 komunikacije	--	--	4	3	1	2	1	0	0	1	0	0	0	0		1
27 Dec 2018	2x1 komunikacije	--	--	4	3	2	1	1	0	0	1	0	0	0	0		1
18 Jan 2019	IPSOS	--	--	3	2	2	2	1	0	0	1	1	0	0	0		1
1 Feb 2019	2x1 komunikacije	--	--	4	3	1	2	1	0	0	1	0	0	0	0		1
27 Feb 2019	IPSOS	--	--	6	3	1	1	0	1	0	0	0	0	0	0		3
28 Feb 2019	2x1 komunikacije	--	--	4	3	1	2	1	0	0	1	0	0	0	0		1
6 Mar 2019	Promocija plus	--	--	5	3	2	1	1	0	0	0	0	0	0	0		2
21 Mar 2019	Promocija plus	--	--	5	3	2	1	1	0	0	0	0	0	0	0		2
23 Mar 2019	2x1 komunikacije	--	--	4	3	1	2	1	0	0	1	0	0	0	0		1
26 Mar 2019	IPSOS	--	--	6	3	1	1	1	0	0	0	0	0	0	0		3
7 Apr 2019	Promocija plus	--	--	5	3	1	1	1	0	0	1	0	0	0	0		2
21 Apr 2019	Promocija plus	--	--	5	3	1	1	1	0	0	0	0	0	0	0		2
27 Apr 2019	IPSOS	--	--	5	3	1	1	1	0	0	0	0	0	0	0		2
29 Apr 2019	Oraclum	--	--	6	3	1	1	1	0	0	0	0	0	0	0		3
30 Apr 2019	2x1 komunikacije	--	--	4	4	1	1	1	0	0	1	0	0	0	0		0
8 May 2019	Promocija plus	--	--	5	3	1	1	1	0	0	0	0	0	0	0		2
20 May 2019	Promocija plus	--	--	5	3	1	1	1	0	0	0	0	0	0	0		2
23 May 2019	2X1 komunikacije	--	--	4	4	2	1	1	0	0	0	0	0	0	0		0
24 May 2019	IPSOS	--	--	5	3	1	1	1	0	0	0	0	0	1	0		2
24 May 2019	Oraclum	--	--	6	3	1	1	1	0	0	0	0	0	0	0		3

=== Exit polls ===
Date	Polling firm	HDZ	SDP	NL Mislav Kolakušić	Croatian Sovereignists	Živi zid	Amsterdam Coalition
26 May 2019	Ipsos puls	5	3	1	1	1	1

== Results ==
Parties with most votes by county: Social Democratic Party of Croatia (SDP) Croatian Democratic Union (HDZ) Croatian People's Party – Liberal Democrats (HNS) Amsterdam Coalition

Results by municipality, shaded according to winning party's percentage of the vote.: HDZ—60–70% HDZ—50–60% HDZ—40–50% HDZ—<40% SDP—50–60% SDP—40–50% SDP—<40% / AK—60–70% AK—50–60% AK—40–50% AK—<40% HNS—40–50% HNS—<40% / SDSS—>80% SDSS—70–80% SDSS—60–70% SDSS—50–60% SDSS—40–50% SDSS—<40% Others

The ruling HDZ won 22.72% of the vote and 4 seats in the European Parliament. The SDP, the main opposition party, also won 4 seats in the parliament, with 18.71% of the popular vote. The SDP will gain the fourth seat after the United Kingdom leaves the EU. The Croatian Sovereignists coalition, the independent list of Mislav Kolakušić, the Živi Zid party, and the Amsterdam Coalition won one seat each. The voter turnout was 29.9%, up from 25.2% in the 2014 election.

Prime Minister Plenković admitted that he expected more votes. The elected MEP's of the HDZ list are Karlo Ressler, Dubravka Šuica, Tomislav Sokol and Željana Zovko. SDP President Davor Bernardić was satisfied with the results, which exceeded his expectations. The elected MEP's of the SDP are Biljana Borzan, Tonino Picula, Predrag Fred Matić and Romana Jerković. Jerković will take her seat after Brexit. Ruža Tomašić of the Croatian Sovereignists won the highest number of preferential votes and retained her seat in the parliament. The biggest surprise of the election was Kolakušić's independent list, which won 7.89% of the vote. Kolakušić announced a presidential campaign the day after the election.

Ivan Vilibor Sinčić, the president of the Živi zid party, won most preferential votes on his party list and a place in the parliament ahead of the slate leader, Tihomir Lukanić. The Amsterdam Coalition's main candidate, Valter Flego, won a seat in the parliament.

Party	Votes	%	Seats
Croatian Democratic Union	244,076	22.73	4
Social Democratic Party	200,976	18.71	4
HRAST–HKS–HSP AS–UHD	91,546	8.52	1
Independent Candidate – Mislav Kolakušić	84,765	7.89	1
Human Shield	60,847	5.67	1
HSS–GLAS–IDS–HSU–PGS–DEMOKRATI–LABURISTI	55,829	5.20	1
Bridge of Independent Lists	50,257	4.68	0
Independent Candidate – Marijana Petir	47,358	4.41	0
NHR–HSP	46,970	4.37	0
Independent Democratic Serb Party	28,597	2.66	0
Croatian People's Party – Liberal Democrats	27,958	2.60	0
Party of Anti-corruption, Development and Transparency	21,744	2.02	0
Bandić Milan 365 – Labour and Solidarity Party	21,175	1.97	0
We can!–NL–ORaH	19,313	1.80	0
Pametno–UK	15,074	1.40	0
People's Party – Reformists	9,971	0.93	0
Green List	5,972	0.56	0
Croatian Social Liberal Party	5,876	0.55	0
Croatian Democratic Party	5,610	0.52	0
Authentic Croatian Party of Rights	4,391	0.41	0
Let's Unblock Croatia	3,981	0.37	0
Party of People's and Civic Action	3,683	0.34	0
Croatian Demochristian Party	3,651	0.34	0
RF–SRP	2,622	0.24	0
Movement for a Modern Croatia	2,581	0.24	0
Democratic Alliance of Serbs	2,036	0.19	0
Croatian Defence People's Party	1,588	0.15	0
My Beloved Croatia	1,168	0.11	0
Zagorje Party for Zagreb	1,128	0.11	0
Free Croatia	1,021	0.10	0
Croatian Community Party	944	0.09	0
Croatian Party of Order	733	0.07	0
Freedom Party of Croatia	513	0.05	0
Total	1,073,954	100.00	12
Valid votes	1,073,954	97.32	
Invalid/blank votes	29,597	2.68	
Total votes	1,103,551	100.00	
Registered voters/turnout	3,696,907	29.85	
Source: State Election Committee

=== Elected lists and candidates ===
6: HRAST - HKS - HSP AS - UHD	9: HDZ	12: HSS - GLAS - IDS - HSU -PGS - D - HL-SR	15: NLMK	28: SDP	33: ŽZ
* Ruža Tomašić (HKS)	* Karlo Ressler (HDZ) * Dubravka Šuica (HDZ) * Tomislav Sokol (HDZ) * Željana Zovko (HDZ)	* Valter Flego (IDS)	* Mislav Kolakušić (Independent)	* Biljana Borzan (SDP) * Tonino Picula (SDP) * Predrag Fred Matić (SDP) * Romana Jerković (SDP)	* Ivan Vilibor Sinčić (ŽZ)

=== List of elected MEPs ===
MEP	Party	Number of preference votes	Share of preference votes on candidate's list	Term length
Ruža Tomašić	HKS	69,989	76.45%	1 July 2013 – 26 June 2021
Mislav Kolakušić	Ind.	68,883	81.26%	2 July 2019 –
Biljana Borzan	SDP	64,736	32.21%	1 July 2013 –
Karlo Ressler	HDZ	52,859	21.65%	2 July 2019 –
Tonino Picula	SDP	50,921	25.33%	1 July 2013 –
Dubravka Šuica	HDZ	31,791	13.02%	1 July 2013 –
Valter Flego	IDS	21,228	38.03%	2 July 2019 –
Ivan Vilibor Sinčić	ŽZ	18,314	30.09%	2 July 2019 –
Predrag Matić	SDP	13,371	6.65%	2 July 2019 –
Željana Zovko	HDZ	9,861	4.04%	21 November 2016 –
Tomislav Sokol	HDZ	4,573	1.87%	2 July 2019 –
Romana Jerković	SDP	1,368	0.68%	2 July 2019 –

== See also ==
- Croatia (European Parliament constituency)
