= 1997 Croatian local elections =

- 13 April 1997

Local elections were held in Croatia on 13 April 1997. These were first local elections in Croatia after the war and the unification of the territory.

== Electoral system ==
Regional and local self-government elections are conducted so that three quarters of the members each county, city or municipal councils were elected through a joint list and the remaining quarter through individual constituencies. The electoral threshold was set at 5% for parties running independently, at 8% for any two-party coalition, and at 11% for any coalition of three or more parties 11%. In constituencies where two or more candidates received the same number of votes the election was repeated. The number of councilors elected depended on the population of each constituency. Municipalities and towns up to 10,000 inhabitants elected 20 councilors, municipalities and towns up to 20,000 inhabitants elected 25 councilors, cities up to 40,000 inhabitants elected 30 councilors, cities up to 100,000 inhabitants elected 40 councilors, and cities with over 100,000 inhabitants elected 45 councilors, same as counties. Inhabitants of Zagreb elected 50 councilors for the City Assembly of Zagreb. City and municipality mayors as well as county prefects were elected by relevant city, municipality or county council. In some constituencies the total number of seats differed slightly due special additional seats for national minorities which were assigned independently.

=== Elections in the area under the United Nations administration ===
In the area of Eastern Slavonia, Baranja and Western Syrmia the election was conducted with the support and under the supervision of the United Nations Transitional Administration for Eastern Slavonia, Baranja and Western Sirmium. Successful organization of these elections was a precondition for the establishment of new local Croatian institutions in the region and for the closure of the parallel Serb regional assembly by May 1, 1997. The same applied to the local Executive Council which was replaced by the Joint Council of Municipalities. The parallel Serb regional Assembly invited citizens to participate in the election only 48 hours before the election day, but UNTAES only permitted voter registration until April 12. These two factors contributed to a low turnout in this area, forcing UNTAES to extend the election in this region for a couple of days. Ahead of the election, local parallel institutions organized the 1997 Eastern Slavonia integrity referendum.

== Election results ==
=== Counties ===
Results of 1997 elections in Croatian counties
County	County council	
County	Plurality	Seats
Bjelovar-Bilogora	HDZ	21/40
Brod-Posavina	HDZ	28/40
Dubrovnik-Neretva	HDZ	20/40
Istria	IDS	26/40
Karlovac	HDZ	24/40
Koprivnica-Križevci	HSS	21/40
Krapina-Zagorje	HDZ	20/40
Lika-Senj	HDZ	34/45
Međimurje	HSLS, HSS	19/40
Osijek-Baranja	HDZ	25/45
Požega-Slavonia	HDZ	26/41
Primorje-Gorski Kotar	SDP, PGS, HNS	18/40
Sisak-Moslavina	HDZ	29/40
Split-Dalmatia	HDZ	23/40
Šibenik-Knin	HDZ	25/40
Varaždin	HDZ, HKDS, HSP	23/40
Virovitica-Podravina	HDZ	24/42
Vukovar-Syrmia	HDZ	24/40
Zadar	HDZ	25/40
Zagreb County	HDZ	26/45
City of Zagreb	HDZ	24/50
Source: Election results

=== Cities ===
Results of 1997 elections in Croatian cities
	City Council	
City	Plurality	Seats
Bakar	HDZ, HKDU, HSP	7/20
Beli Manastir	SDSS	15/26
Belišće	HDZ	14/25
Benkovac	HDZ	21/25
Biograd na Moru	HDZ	12/26
Bjelovar	HDZ	17/28
Buje	IDS	16/26
Buzet	IDS	17/26
Cres	HDZ, HKDU	7/20
Crikvenica	HSLS, SDP, HNS	15/26
Čabar	SDP, HSLS, HNS	17/26
Čakovec	HSLS	11/30
Čazma	HSS	7/15 (20)^{1}
Daruvar	HDZ	9/25
Delnice	SDP, PGS, HNS	10/20
Donja Stubica	HDZ	8/20
Donji Miholjac	HDZ	11/25
Drniš	HDZ	20/26
Dubrovnik	HDZ	9/26
Duga Resa	HDZ	11/26
Dugo Selo	HDZ	12/25
Đakovo	HDZ	17/26
Đurđevac	HDZ	13/20
Garešnica	HSS, SDP, HSLS	10/20
Glina	HDZ	24/27
Gospić	HDZ	20/26
Grubišno Polje	HDZ	13/20
Hrvatska Kostajnica	HDZ	17/20
Hvar	HDZ	11/26
Ilok	HDZ	19/25
Imotski	HDZ	17/26
Ivanić-Grad	HDZ / HSLS	8/25
Ivanec	HSS, HNS, HSLS, SDP	14/25
Jastrebarsko	HDZ	16/25
Karlovac	HDZ	15/26
Kastav	SDP, HNS	9/20
Kaštela	HDZ	17/26
Klanjec	HDZ	10/20
Knin	HDZ	19/25
Komiža	HSS	9/20
Koprivnica	HSLS, HSS, SDP, HNS, HKDU	17/26
Korčula	HDZ, HSP / SDP, HSLS, HNS, HSS	13/26
Kraljevica	HDZ, HKDU, HSP	9/20
Krapina	HDZ	13/26
Križevci	HDZ	14/26
Krk	PGS, HNS, SDP	16/26
Kutina	HDZ	11/24
Labin	IDS	16/26
Lepoglava	HDZ	10/20
Lipik	HDZ	14/20
Ludbreg	HDZ, HKDS	7/20
Makarska	SDP	13/26
Mali Lošinj	HSLS, HNS, IDS, SDP	11/20
Metković	HDZ	9/26
Mursko Središće	HDZ, HKDU, HSP	8/20
Našice	HDZ	14/26
Nin	HDZ	10/20
Nova Gradiška	HDZ	14/26
Novalja	HDZ	13/20
Novi Marof	HDZ	16/25
Novi Vinodolski	HDZ, HKDU, HSP	10/26
Novigrad	IDS	18/24
Novska	HDZ	19/26
Obrovac	HDZ	14/20
Ogulin	HDZ	14/26
Omiš	HDZ	17/26
Opatija	IDS	15/26
Opuzen	HDZ	15/20
Orahovica	HSLS, HNS, HSS, SDP	10/20
Oroslavje	HDZ	11/20
Osijek	HSLS, HSS	14/26
Otočac	HDZ	16/26
Ozalj	HDZ	13/20
Pag	HNS, HSS, SDP, HSLS	12/20
Pakrac	HDZ	17/20
Pazin	IDS	17/26
Petrinja	HDZ	19/28
Pleternica	HDZ	15/24
Ploče	HDZ	13/26
Požega	HSS, HSLS, SDP, HNS	15/30
Skradin	HDZ	15/20
Slatina	HDZ	13/26
Poreč	IDS	19/26
Požega	HSS, HSLS, SDP, HNS	15/30
Pregrada	HDZ	9/20
Prelog	HDZ, HKDU, HSP, KDM	10/20
Pula	IDS	15/32
Rab	HDZ, HSP, HKDU	12/26
Rijeka	SDP, PGS, HNS	22/34
Rovinj	IDS	17/26
Samobor	HDZ	14/26
Senj	HDZ	14/26
Sinj	HDZ	14/26
Sisak	HDZ, HSP	15/31
Slavonski Brod	HDZ	14/26
Slunj	HDZ	21/28
Solin	HDZ	16/26
Split	HSLS, HNS, SDP, HSS	15/26
Stari Grad	HDZ, HSP	8/20
Supetar	SDP, HSLS	8/20
Sveti Ivan Zelina	HDZ	16/26
Šibenik	SDP, HNS, HSLS, HSS	13/26
Trogir	HSLS, SDP, HNS, ASH	12/26
Umag	IDS	17/24
Valpovo	HDZ	16/26
Varaždin	HDZ, HKDS, HSP	16/39
Varaždinske Toplice	HDZ	11/20
Velika Gorica	HSS, HSLS	12/26
Vinkovci	HDZ	5/5 (20)^{1}
Virovitica	HSLS, HSS	13/26
Vis	HSS	8/26
Vodice	SDP, HNS, HSLS, HSS	10/20
Vrbovec	HDZ	14/26
Vrbovsko	HDZ, HKDU, HSP	9/20
Vrgorac	HDZ	12/20
Vrlika	HDZ	18/20
Vukovar	HDZ / SDSS	12/24
Zabok	HDZ	12/26
Zadar	SDP, HNS, HSLS, HSS	14/27
Zaprešić	HSLS, HSS, SDP, HNS, HKDU	14/26
Zlatar	HDZ	14/26
Županja	HDZ	15/28
Source: Election results

1 Complete data not available. The numbers in parentheses represent the total number of available seats.

== Elections in capital ==
- 1997 Zagreb local elections
