= Democrats (Croatia) =

Liberal political party in Croatia

Democrats Demokrati
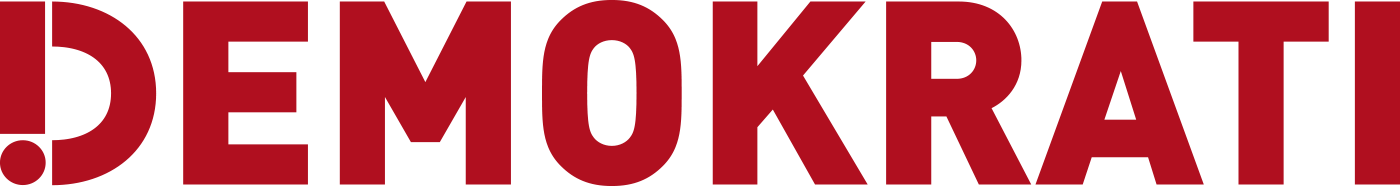
- President: Ivan Lukež
- Vice Presidents: Bojana Hribljan; Matija Ladić
- Founder: Mirando Mrsić
- Founded: 20 October 2018; 7 years ago
- Split from: Social Democratic Party of Croatia
- Headquarters: Zagreb, Croatia
- Ideology: Social democracy Social liberalism Progressivism; Environmentalism; Pro-Europeanism
- Political position: Centre-left
- National affiliation: Amsterdam Coalition (2019–2020); Our Croatia (since 2024)
- Colors: Red
- Croatian Parliament: 0 / 151

Website
- https://demokrati.hr/

The Democrats (Croatian: Demokrati) are a minor centre-left Croatian political party founded by Mirando Mrsić. The party was founded on the 20 October 2018 in Zagreb. It was officially registered with the Ministry of Public Administration on 27 November 2018.

According to the party, their program is based on a "long-term, stable, sustainable development of Croatia.

The party was part of the Amsterdam Coalition, an electoral alliance of seven Croatia liberal political parties, that participated in the 2019 European Parliament election in Croatia.

== Political position ==
At the founding congress, Mrsić stated that the party will campaign for "a Croatia where everybody is paid for their work and of which they can live, has a dignified pension, equal access to quality health care, equal opportunity in education and to live safely in a clean and healthy environment."

The party supports:

- a competitive digital economy,
- decentralization,
- raising wages and pension,
- access to modern technologies and fast internet,
- social justice and civic liberties,
- environmental protection,
- equal opportunity in education and employment,
- LGBT rights,
- a fair judicial system,
- cutting down parafiscal taxes, etc.

== Election results ==
=== Legislative ===
Election	Coalition	Votes	%	Seats	+/–	Government
Election	Coalition	Coalition		Demokrati		Government
2020	HL-RI	6,594	0.40%	0 / 151	New	Extra-parliamentary
2024	Our Croatia	47,655	2.25%	0 / 151	0	Extra-parliamentary

=== European Parliament ===
Election	List leader	Coalition	Votes	%	Seats	+/–	EP Group
Election	List leader	Coalition	Coalition		Demokrati		EP Group
2019	Valter Flego	Amsterdam Coalition	55,806	5.19 (#5)	0 / 12	New	–
2024	Valter Flego	Fair Play List 9 (Note: Including also IDS, NPS, SDSS, HSLS, HNS, NS-R, SD, PGS and RI.)	41,710	5.54 (#5)	0 / 12	0	–
