= Rivers of Justice =

Centre-left political alliance in Croatia

Rivers of Justice Rijeke pravde
- 2024 logo
- Founder: Zoran Milanović
- Founded: 23 November 2010 (Kukuriku)
- Headquarters: Zagreb, Croatia
- Ideology: Social democracy Social liberalism Progressivism
- Political position: Centre to centre-left
- Slogan: "Rivers of justice are coming" ("Rijeke pravde dolaze") (2024)
- Sabor (2024): 42 / 151
- European Parliament (2024) (Note: Biljana Borzan (SDP); Romana Jerković (SDP); Tonino Picula (SDP); Marko Vešligaj (SDP)): 4 / 12

Rivers of Justice (Croatian: Rijeke pravde) was a centre-left political alliance in Croatia. It is the latest in a series of left-liberal coalitions gathered around the Social Democratic Party of Croatia (SDP). The original coalition was founded in 2010 as the Kukuriku coalition (Kukuriku koalicija). This somewhat facetious name meaning 'cock-a-doodle-doo', taken from a restaurant of the same name in Kastav where the coalition leaders first convened in July 2009, became well known and was eventually taken as the coalition's official name. The coalition originally consisted of four centrist and centre-left parties in the Croatian Parliament: the Social Democratic Party of Croatia (SDP), Croatian People's Party – Liberal Democrats (HNS-LD), Croatian Party of Pensioners (HSU) and Istrian Democratic Assembly (IDS). The coalition won an absolute majority of seats in the 2011 parliamentary election and successfully formed a government led by Zoran Milanović (SDP).

In the 2014–15 presidential election, the coalition supported the candidacy of incumbent president Ivo Josipović. He won 38.46% of the vote in the first round, finishing narrowly ahead of conservative Croatian Democratic Union (HDZ) candidate Kolinda Grabar-Kitarović. In the run-off, on 11 January 2015, Josipović lost by a slim margin of around 32,500 votes, winning 49.3% of the vote to Grabar-Kitarović's 50.7%, becoming the first Croatian president to not win re-election.

For the 2015 parliamentary election, the coalition changed its name into Croatia is Growing (Hrvatska raste) in reference to the continuous growth of economic indicators such as the GDP, industrial production, exports, and employment rate, which was achieved in the last two years of the mandate of the Milanović's government. The coalition was later joined by the Croatian Labourists – Labour Party (HL), Croatian Peasant Party (HSS) and Zagorje Party (ZS), while the IDS in turn left it. Nevertheless, the leader of the IDS, Boris Miletić, explicitly pointed out that his party would still continue to collaborate with the coalition. After the coalition failed to achieve a post-electoral agreement with the Bridge of Independent Lists (MOST) on the formation of the new government, it was required to move into the opposition. On 16 July 2016, the SDP, HNS-LD, HSU and the HSS signed coalition agreement in Zabok and thus re-established the coalition under a new name - the People's Coalition (Narodna koalicija). Following the 2016 parliamentary election, the coalition once again failed to return to the government and thus remained in the opposition.

The coalition's founder, former prime minister Zoran Milanović, was elected the 5th president of Croatia in the 2019–20 presidential election. He did so by defeating the incumbent, Kolinda Grabar-Kitarović, of the ruling HDZ. In the run-up to the 2020 parliamentary election five parties agreed to form the Restart Coalition (Restart koalicija). These are the SDP, HSS, HSU, Civic-Liberal Alliance (GLAS) and Power – Party of People's and Civic Engagement (SNAGA), respectively. In May 2020 the coalition was joined by the Damir Bajs Independent List party and the Democratic Alliance of Međimurje, while in June 2020 the coalition was further expanded to include the Istrian Democratic Assembly and the Alliance of Primorje-Gorski Kotar (PGS). On 10 June 2020, Darinko Dumbović, the mayor of Petrinja, and a member of Parliament for the People's Party – Reformists (NS-R), signed a coalition agreement with the Restart Coalition in the 6th electoral district. Furthermore, on 12 June the Restart Coalition reached an agreement with Matija Posavec, the independent prefect of Međimurje County, on a joint electoral list for the 3rd electoral district.

== History ==
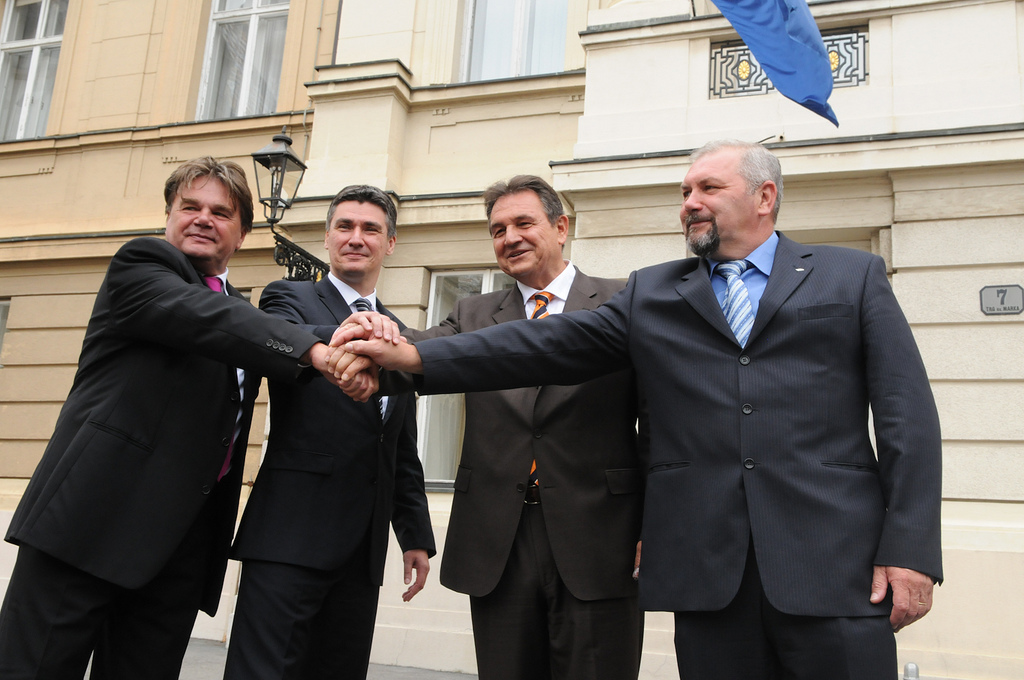
Ivan Jakovčić, Zoran Milanović, Radimir Čačić and Silvano Hrelja announcing the formation of the Kukuriku Coalition on 15 July 2011.

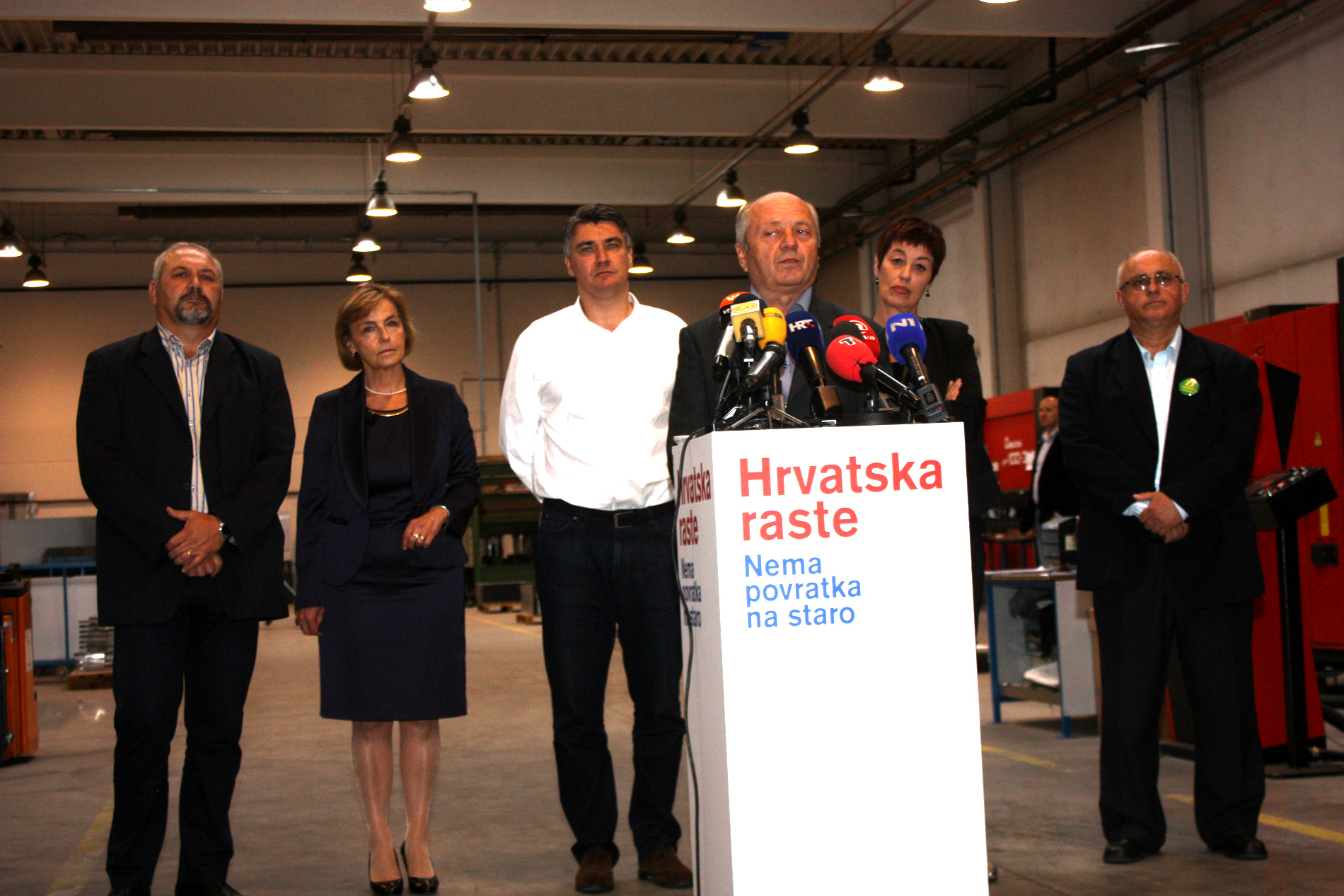
Leaders of the coalition "Croatia is Growing" on the occasion of signing a coalition agreement on 8 September 2015

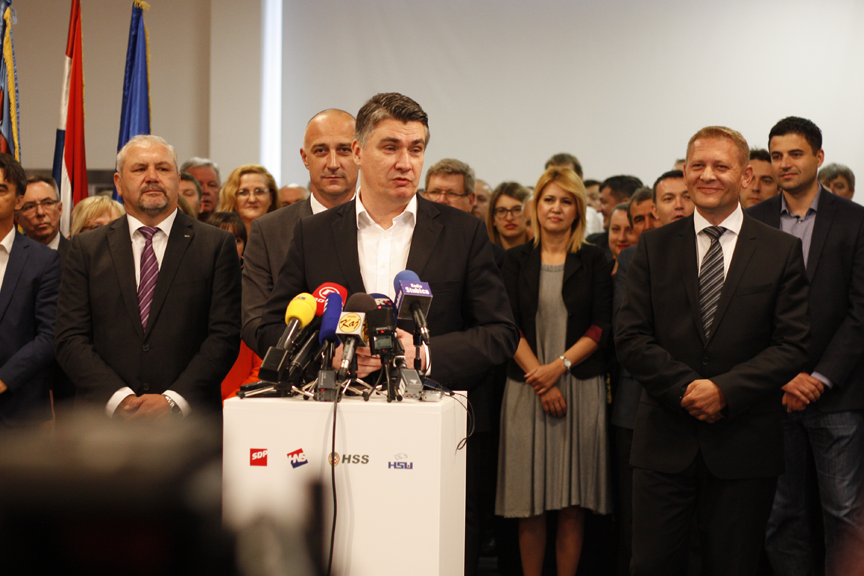
Leaders of the "People's Coalition" on the occasion of signing a coalition agreement on 16 July 2016

=== Kukuriku Coalition (2011–2014) ===
The idea of a joint party list of the main centre-left parties, the Social Democratic Party of Croatia (SDP) and Croatian People's Party (HNS-LD), was discussed in the 2007 general election, however ultimately each party contested the election separately. The election resulted in HDZ forming a Government led by Ivo Sanader and SDP and HNS-LD remaining in Opposition. After the resignation of Prime Minister Sanader in 2009, SDP, HNS-LD and the Istrian Democratic Assembly (IDS) started discussing the possibility of contesting the 2011 parliamentary election more extensively. On 23 November 2010 the three parties along with HSU signed a declaration "Alliance for Change" officially confirming their intention of a joint appearance in the next election.

On 15 September 2011, the coalition launched their manifesto for the 2011 general election called "Plan 21" in Zagreb. In 2011 elections Coalition won the majority in 8 out of 10 electoral districts which resulted in gaining 81 out of 151 seats in the Parliament. On 23 December 2015, the coalition formed the 10th Croatian Government led by Zoran Milanović. The coalition participated on the 2013 European Parliament election and won 5 out of 12 Croatian seats. For the 2014 European Parliament election, the coalition was joined by the Independent Democratic Serb Party eventually winning 4 out of 11 Croatian seats.

=== Croatia is Growing (2015) ===
For the 2015 parliamentary elections, the coalition changed its name into Croatia is Growing, and was joined by Croatian Labourists – Labour Party (HL), Croatian Peasant Party (HSS) and Zagorje Party (ZS), while the IDS left. Nevertheless, leader of IDS Boris Miletić explicitly pointed out that his party would still continue to collaborate with the coalition, and later took an active part in the 2015 post-election negotiations on forming new government as de facto member of the coalition. The coalition eventually ended up winning the majority in 5 out of 10 electoral districts and eventually gained 56 out of 151 seats in the Parliament. After more than 40 days of negotiations with the Bridge of Independent Lists (MOST) and numerous twists and turns mainly due to MOST frequently changing terms, the coalition failed to achieve agreement with MOST on forming new government, which was formed by the independent Tihomir Orešković who was supported by the centre-right alliance, the Patriotic Coalition. Coalition party members returned to the opposition. On 9 April 2016, president of HNS-LD, Ivan Vrdoljak, announced that the coalition ceased to exist since each party had its own parliamentary club adding that his party would still cooperate with its former coalition allies.

=== People's Coalition (2016) ===
On 9 July 2016, Zoran Milanović announced that the SDP, HNS-LD and Croatian Party of Pensioners (HSU) would form the People's Coalition (Narodna koalicija) for the 2016 parliamentary election, adding that the coalition would be ideologically far-reaching and diverse, as it also encompasses the centre-right Croatian Peasant Party (HSS). The three centre-left parties previously formed the Croatia is Growing coalition with the Croatian Labourists – Labour Party and two smaller parties winning 56 seats in the November 2015 parliamentary election, while the HSS contested the elections as part of the Patriotic Coalition which won 59 seats (2 of those going to HSS itself). One of HSS's two parliamentary representatives and former leader Branko Hrg left the party after the party joined the coalition. On the other hand, Authentic Croatian Peasant Party and Croatian Peasant Party of Radić Brothers which had more than 6.000 members decided to merge into HSS after they split from it in 2007 dissatisfied with HSS's cooperation with the Croatian Democratic Union (HDZ).

=== Restart Coalition (2020) ===
On 9 May 2020, the SDP, HSS, HSU, Civic-Liberal Alliance (Glas) and Power – Party of People's and Civic Engagement (SNAGA), launched a joint electoral programme and announced the beginning of their campaign for the 2020 parliamentary election. In mid-May 2020 the party led by Bjelovar-Bilogora County prefect Damir Bajs – called the Damir Bajs Independent List – joined the coalition. It was followed a few days later by the Democratic Alliance of Međimurje (MDS). In June 2020 the coalition was expanded when the original member parties agreed to terms set out by the Istrian Democratic Assembly (IDS) and the Alliance of Primorje-Gorski Kotar (PGS) for joining the common electoral lists. Namely, the IDS and the PGS had asked the Restart Coalition for certain reassurances, including a promise that Istria would be maintained as a separate political unit in any future administrative reform of Croatia's existing system of counties. Furthermore, in addition to its national-level coalition agreements, the Restart Coalition has also formed joint electoral lists with several parties and independent individuals at an electoral district level. These include Petrinja mayor and Member of Parliament Darinko Dumbović of the People's Party – Reformists (in the 6th electoral district), as well as non-partisan Međimurje County prefect Matija Posavec (in the 3rd electoral district). The Restart Coalition is led by SDP chairman Davor Bernardić, who is thus the alliance's prime-ministerial candidate.

=== Rivers of Justice (2024) ===
The Social Democratic Party announced negotiations for another center-left coalition on 5 March 2024, about a month before the elections. Originally dubbed "Coalition for a Better Croatia" (Croatian: Koalicija za bolju Hrvatsku), the SDP thus began their campaign for the 2024 parliamentary election. This coalition aimed to unite a total of 10 parties: the SDP, HSS, IDS, PGS, the Centre, Focus, the Reformists, the Workers' Front (RF), Glas and People with a First and Last Name ("DO i SIP" or simply IP), and was conceived of as a reaction to the large number of corruption scandals involving ministers of the ruling party, HDZ, over their two mandates in power.

Despite originally intending for chairman Peđa Grbin to be the prime-ministerial candidate, the SDP organized a press conference on Friday 15 March 2024, where Zoran Milanović, the acting president of Croatia, made a surprise announcement of his candidature both on the SDP's electoral list for parliament and for the function of SDP's prime minister as an independent. The announcement was concluded with the line "The rivers of justice are coming, they will overflow come spring", taken from Jura Stublić's song Rijeke pravde (English: The Rivers of Justice). Milanović intended to resign from the office of president before being sworn into the position of prime minister, thus circumventing the constitutional prohibition of the President of Croatia from participating in party politics or holding another public office—something that Grbin preemptively inquired about via a letter to the Constitutional Court of Croatia. The move was, however, first scrutinized by constitutional experts and political opposition over the following weekend, claiming the candidacy was "unconstitutional", with acting prime minister, Andrej Plenković, calling it a "mini coup d'etat". After convening on Monday 18 March 2024, the Constitutional Court delivered a non-unanimous verdict (with 2 justices voting against, and 2 refusing to vote), opining that Milanović's candidacy from the position of president of the Republic was unconstitutional and warning the SDP against promoting him as part of the campaign or as a political candidate for as long as he remains president, lest the elections be postponed or their results rejected. Consequently, Grbin affirmed they will comply with the verdict, but decided to rename the coalition to Rivers of Justice in reference to Milanović's announcement. Both Grbin and Milanović claimed that the court's verdict is an "attempt at a coup" that "certain individuals" organized by relying on personal connections to the president of the Constitutional Court. Milanović later announced that he still intends to become the prime minister "legally and courteously", but refused to reveal how, emphasizing that a vote for any party other than the HDZ is "good".

In reaction to Milanović's planned candidacy, three parties left the negotiations for the coalition: RF, Focus and the IDS. Although the SDP decided to stop negotiations with them due to unnamed disagreements, the RF cited political and ideological disagreements with Milanović that would have caused them to drop out of the coalition regardless. On the other hand, Focus and the IDS decided to back away mainly due to disagreements with the candidacy itself, arguing that they do not wish to back unconstitutional political maneuvers, as well as due to miscellaneous disagreements with other practices of the SDP, such as aggressive political rhetoric and generally poor negotiation.

A former director of the Croatian Bureau of Statistics, Marko Krištof, calculated how many more mandates could a left-liberal alliance consisting of Rivers of Justice, We can!, Focus, and the Workers' Front have gained had they ran in the elections together, on the condition they had received the same number of votes as they did individually: We Can! would have benefited the most, with four more mandates, followed by the Workers' Front with two mandates, as opposed to none, and Focus with one additional mandate.

== Member parties ==
=== Original members ===
Party	Abbr.	Ideology	Position	Leader	Member
Social Democratic Party of Croatia	SDP	Social democracy Pro-Europeanism	Centre-left	Siniša Hajdaš Dončić	2011–2024
Croatian People's Party – Liberal Democrats	HNS-LD	Social liberalism Pro-Europeanism	Centre to centre-left	Radimir Čačić, Vesna Pusić, Ivan Vrdoljak	2011–2016
Istrian Democratic Assembly	IDS-DDI	Regionalism; Liberalism	Centre to centre-left	Boris Miletić, Dalibor Paus	2011–2015, 2020, 2024
Croatian Party of Pensioners	HSU	Single-issue politics (Rights of pensioners)	Centre-left	Silvano Hrelja	2011–2016, 2020

=== Subsequent members ===
Party	Abbreviation	Ideology	Position	Leader	Member in
Independent Democratic Serb Party	SDSS	Serb minority politics Social democracy	Centre-left	Vojislav Stanimirović	2014
Authentic Croatian Peasant Party	AHSS	Agrarianism; Green conservatism	Centre-right	Stanko Grčić	2015
Croatian Labourists – Labour Party	HL-SR	Social democracy Democratic Socialism	Centre-left to left-wing	Nansi Tireli	2015
Zagorje Party	ZS	Hrvatsko Zagorje regionalism	Centre	Miljenko Jerneić	2015
Croatian Peasant Party	HSS	Agrarianism; Liberalism	Centre to centre-left	Krešo Beljak	2016, 2020, 2024
Civic Liberal Alliance	GLAS	Social liberalism	Centre-left	Anka Mrak-Taritaš	2020, 2024
Damir Bajs Independent List	DBNL	Bjelovar-Bilogora County localism	Centre	Damir Bajs	2020
Power - Party of People's and Civic Engagement	SNAGA	Populism; Fiscal reformism		Goran Aleksić	2020
Democratic Alliance of Međimurje	MDS	Regionalism	Centre	Željko Pavlic	2020
Alliance of Primorje-Gorski Kotar	PGS	Regionalism; Liberalism	Centre	Darijo Vasilić	2020, 2024
People's Party – Reformists	NS-R	Liberalism	Centre	Radimir Čačić	2020, (Note: only in 6th electoral district); 2024
Centre	Centar	Liberalism	Centre	Ivica Puljak	2024
Dalija Orešković and People with a First and Last Name	DO i SIP	Anti-corruption	Centre to centre-left	Dalija Orešković	2024
Workers' Front	RF	Democratic socialism	Left-wing to far-left	Collective leadership	2024
Focus	Fokus	Classical liberalism	Centre to centre-right	Davor Nađi	2024

== Election results ==
=== Parliamentary elections ===
Parliament of Croatia
Election	Leader	Coalition name	Popular vote	% of popular vote	Overall seats won	Seat change (compared to previous coalition)	Government
2011	Zoran Milanović	Kukuriku Coalition	958,312	40.0%	81 / 151 (Note: SDP (61), HNS-LD (13), IDS (3), HSU (2), Vladimir Bilek (Czech and Slovak minority; HNS-LD))	▲14	government
2015	Zoran Milanović	Croatia is Growing	744,507	32.31%	59 / 151 (Note: SDP (42), HNS-LD (9), HL-SR (3), HSU (2), Sándor Juhász (Hungarian minority; SDP), Ermina Lekaj Prljaskaj (Albanian, Bosniak, Macedonian, Montenegrin and Slovene minority; HNS-LD), Veljko Kajtazi (Austrian, Bulgarian, German, Jewish, Polish, Roma, Romanian, Rusyn, Russian, Turkish, Ukrainian, Vlach minority; HNS-LD))	▼22	opposition
2016	Zoran Milanović	People's Coalition	636,602	33.82%	56 / 151 (Note: SDP (38), HNS-LD (9), HSS (5), HSU (2), Ermina Lekaj Prljaskaj (Albanian, Bosniak, Macedonian, Montenegrin and Slovene minority; HNS-LD), Veljko Kajtazi (Austrian, Bulgarian, German, Jewish, Polish, Roma, Romanian, Rusyn, Russian, Turkish, Ukrainian, Vlach minority; HNS-LD))	▼3	opposition
2020	Davor Bernardić	Restart Coalition	414,615	24.87%	41 / 151 (Note: SDP (33), IDS (3), HSS (2), HSU (1), Glas (1) and DBNL (1))	▼15	opposition
2024	Peđa Grbin	Rivers of Justice	538,748	25.40%	42 / 151 (Note: SDP (37), Centre (2), HSS (1), GLAS (1) and DO i SIP (1))	▲1	opposition

=== Presidential elections ===
Election	Candidate	Party	1st round			2nd round			Result
Election	Candidate	Party	Rank	# of overall vote	% of overall vote	Rank	# of overall vote	% of overall vote	Result
2014–15	Ivo Josipović	SDP	#1	687,678	38.46	#2	1,082,436	49.26	Lost
2019–20	Zoran Milanović	SDP	#1	562,783	29.55	#1	1,034,170	52.66	Won
2024–25	Zoran Milanović	Independent (Note: Milanović was elected in the 2019–20 election as the candidate of the SDP. However, under Article 96 of the Constitution of Croatia, sitting presidents are prohibited from holding party memberships for the duration of their term. As a result, he will stand as an independent candidate, with informal SDP affiliation.)	#1	797,938	49.09	#1	1,122,859	74.68	Won

=== European Parliament elections ===
European Parliament
Election	List leader	Coalition	Votes	%	Seats	+/–	EP Group
2013 (Note: SDP (5))	Tonino Picula	Kukuriku Coalition	237,778	32.07 (#2)	5 / 12	New	S&D
2014 (Note: SDP (2), HNS (1), IDS (1))	Neven Mimica	Kukuriku Coalition	275,904	29.93 (#2)	4 / 11	▼1	S&D / ALDE / Greens-EFA
2019	SDP contested the election alone						
2024 (Note: SDP (4))	Biljana Borzan	Rivers of Justice	192,859	25.62 (#2)	4 / 11	0	S&D

== Former logos ==
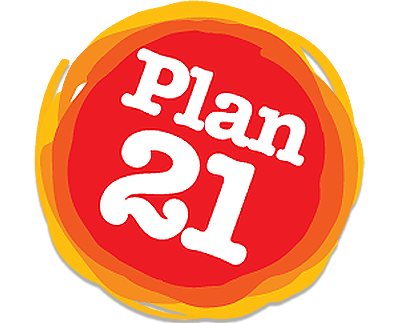
Kukuriku Coalition
2011–2015

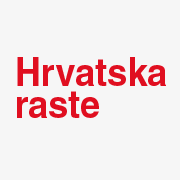
Croatia is Growing
2015

People's Coalition
2016

Restart Coalition
2020

== See also ==
- Amsterdam Coalition
- Cabinet of Zoran Milanović
