= People's Party – Reformists =

Croatian political party

People's Party – Reformists Narodna stranka – Reformisti
- Abbreviation: NS-R (Note: Official abbreviation, according to the Register of political parties, is REFORMISTI)
- President: Radimir Čačić
- Founder: Radimir Čačić
- Founded: 28 September 2014
- Split from: Croatian People's Party
- Headquarters: Zagreb
- Membership (2022): 8,002
- Ideology: Liberalism; Economic liberalism; Pro-Europeanism
- Political position: Centre
- National affiliation: Rivers of Justice (2024)
- European affiliation: European Democratic Party
- Colours: Purple
- Sabor: 0 / 151
- European Parliament: 0 / 12
- County Prefects: 0 / 21
- Mayors: 0 / 128

Website
- reformisti.hr

People's Party – Reformists (Croatian: Narodna stranka – Reformisti or NS-R), also known just as the Reformists (Croatian: Reformisti) is a liberal political party in Croatia.

== History ==
The civil initiative for the establishment of the party was launched by former Croatian People's Party – Liberal Democrats (HNS) chief Radimir Čačić and his associates Natalija Martinčević and Petar Baranović. More than two-thirds of the party members are former members of the HNS which left the party because of disagreements with its leadership over the exclusion of Radimir Čačić from the party while he was serving a prison sentence for unintentionally causing a traffic accident with two fatalities.

According to the parties former acting president Natalija Martinčević, about 200 members from HNS Zagreb and Varaždin branches each have left the party in order to join the People's party - Reformists.

The party's founding congress was held on September 28, 2014 in Zagreb. Radimir Čačić was unanimously elected for the first party president.

== Election results ==
Ahead of the 2015 parliamentary election the party formed a coalition, "Successful Croatia", with the centre-left Forward Croatia-Progressive Alliance. In the 2015 election, the party won one seat in the Croatian Parliament in the III electoral district, held by Radimir Čačić. Čačić voted in favor of approving Cabinet of Tihomir Orešković. Party participated at the 2016 extraordinary parliamentary election as part of the For Prime Minister Coalition led by Mayor of Zagreb Milan Bandić, and eventually won 1 seat. NS-R voted in favor of approving Cabinet of Andrej Plenković. At the 2017 local elections, Radimir Čačić was elected prefect of Varaždin County and Darinko Dumbović mayor of Petrinja. NS-R also entered many county, city, and municipal councils, mostly in Northern Croatia.

=== Presidential ===
The following is a list of presidential candidates who were endorsed by NS-R.

Election year(s)	Candidate	1st round		2nd round		Result
Election year(s)	Candidate	Votes	%	Votes	%	Result
2014-15	Ivo Josipović (SDP)	687,678	38.46 (#1)	1,082,436	49.26 (#2)	Lost
2019-20	Zoran Milanović (SDP)	562,783	29.91 (#1)	1,034,170	52.66 (#1)	Won
2024-25	Zoran Milanović (Ind.)	797,938	49.68 (#1)	1,122,859	74.68 (#1)	Won

=== Legislative ===
The following is a summary of the party's results in legislative elections for the Croatian parliament. The "total votes" and "percentage" columns include sums of votes won by pre-election coalitions NS-R had been part of.

Election	In coalition with	Votes won	Percentage	Seats won	Change	Government
Election	In coalition with	(Coalition totals)		(NS-R only)		Government
2015	NS-PS, DDS, HSU-U, ZF	34,573	1.54	1 / 151	New	Opposition
2016	BM 365, NV-SR, HSS SR, BUZ	76,054	4.04	1 / 151	0	Government support
2020	SHU, HSS BR, NSH, HDS, Restart Coalition (6th electoral district)	16,900	1.01	1 / 151	0	Government support
2024	Rivers of Justice	538,748	25.40	0 / 151	▼1	Extra-parliamentary

=== European Parliament ===
Election	List leader	Coalition	Votes	%	Seats	+/–	EP Group
Election	List leader	Coalition	Coalition		NS-R		EP Group
2019	Radimir Čačić	None	9,971	0.92 (#14)	0 / 12	New	–
2024	Valter Flego	Fair Play List 9 (Note: Including also IDS, NPS, SDSS, HSLS, HNS, SD, D, PGS and RI.)	41,710	5.54 (#5)	0 / 12	0	–
