= Liberalism in Croatia =

This article gives an overview of liberalism in Croatia. Liberals became active since 1860 in Dalmatia and since 1904 in the rest of Croatia. It never became a major political party. It is limited to liberal parties with substantial support, mainly proved by having had a representation in parliament. The sign ⇒ denotes another party in that scheme. For inclusion in this scheme it isn't necessary so that parties labeled themselves as a liberal party.

== History ==
After the restoration of democracy in 1989 liberalism became very divided. Before 2020, one could have distinguished five parties: the right of center Croatian Social Liberal Party (Hrvatska socijalno-liberalna stranka, member of LI, ALDE), two center liberal parties: Croatian People's Party - Liberal Democrats (Hrvatska narodna stranka - liberalni demokrati, observer in LI, member of ALDE) and People's Party - Reformists (Narodna stranka – reformisti, member of EDP), while left of center is Civic Liberal Alliance (Građansko-liberalni savez - GLAS, member of ALDE). Reformists and GLAS are formed from dissidents of the Croatian People's Party-Liberal Democrats. Istrian Democratic Assembly (Istarski demokratski sabor - Dieta Democratica Istriana, member of ALDE) is considered as Istrian regionalist, but also as a liberal party. In the 2020 Croatian parliamentary election two additional liberal parties emerged as factors on the national scene: Centre and Focus, both members of ALDE.

Main media exponents of Croatian liberalism or liberal ideas include or included newspapers Novi list and Glas Istre, culture magazine Zarez and the defunct weekly Feral Tribune.

=== 1860–1945 ===
National Party (People's Party)

- 1860: National liberals formed in Dalmatia the National party known also as the People's Party (Narodna stranka). The party developed into a conservative party around 1889.

From Progressive Party to Progressive Democratic Party

- 1904: Progressive liberals formed in the Kingdom of Croatia-Slavonia the Progressive Party (Napredna stranka)
- 1906: The NS merged with the ⇒ Democratic Party into the Croatian People's Progressive Party (Hrvatska pučka napredna stranka)
- 1910: The party merged with the Party of Rights (Hrvatska stranka prava) into the Croatian Independent Party (Hrvatska samostalna stranka)
- 1918: The party is reorganised into the Progressive Democratic Party (Napredna demokratska stranka)
- 1919: The party became part of the conservative Croatian Union (Hrvatska zajednica)

Democratic Party (Dalmatia)

- 1906: Dalmatian liberals formed the Democratic Party (Demokratska stranka)
- 1908: The DS merged into the ⇒ Croatian People's Progressive Party

From Democratic Community to Democratic Party (Yugoslavia)

- 1919: Croatian liberals became part of the Yugoslav State Party of Serbian, Croatian and Slovene Democrats (Državnotvorna stranka demokrata Srba, Hrvata i Slovenaca)
- 1919: The party is renamed into the Democratic Community (Demokratska zajednica)
- 1920: The party is renamed into the Democratic Party (Demokratska stranka)
- 1924: A faction formed the ⇒ Independent Democratic Party
- 1945: The party is dissolved

Independent Democratic Party

- 1924: The former Serbian Independent Party seceded from the ⇒ Democratic Party and constituted the Independent Democratic Party (Samostalna demokratska stranka), led by Svetozar Pribićević, mainly active in the Serbian population of Croatia
- 1945: The party is dissolved

=== 1989–present ===
Croatian Social Liberal Union / Croatian Social Liberal Party

- 1989: Liberals formed the Croatian Social Liberal Union (Hrvatski socijalno-liberalni savez), renamed in 1990 into the Croatian Social Liberal Party (Hrvatska socijalno-liberalna stranka)
- 1998: A left-wing faction formed the ⇒ Liberal Party
- 2002: A faction secedes to form the ⇒ Party of Liberal Democrats

Croatian People's Party – Liberal Democrats

- 1990: Dissident communists formed the liberal Croatian People's Party (Hrvatska narodna stranka)
- 2005: The ⇒ Party of Liberal Democrats merges into the party, which is renamed into Croatian People's Party-Liberal Democrats (Hrvatska narodna stranka - liberalni demokrati)
- 2014: A faction secedes to form the ⇒ People's Party - Reformists
- 2017: A left-wing faction formed the ⇒ Civic Liberal Alliance

Liberal Party

- 1998: A left-wing faction of the ⇒ Croatian Social Liberal Party formed the Liberal Party (Liberalna stranka)
- 2006: The majority of the Liberal Party merges into the ⇒Croatian Social Liberal Party.

Party of Liberal Democrats

- 2002: A faction of the ⇒ Croatian Social Liberal Party led by Jozo Radoš formed the Party of Liberal Democrats (LIBRA - Stranka liberalnih demokrata)
- 2003: LIBRA wins three Parliament seats
- February 6, 2005: most of the 248 representatives of Libra on its second convention voted to merge with the Croatian People's Party
- 2005: The party of Liberal Democrats merges into the ⇒ Croatian People's Party, which is renamed into Croatian People's Party-Liberal Democrats

People's Party - Reformists

- 2014: A faction led by former party leader Radimir Čačić left the ⇒Croatian People's Party – Liberal Democrats to form People's Party - Reformists (Narodna stranka - reformisti).

Civic Liberal Alliance

- July, 2017: A faction of the ⇒Croatian People's Party – Liberal Democrats led by Anka Mrak Taritaš, MP (and 2017 Zagreb mayoress candidate) together with three other MPs formed the Civic Liberal Alliance (Građansko-liberalni savez known as GLAS), after the majority of the Croatian People's Party-Liberal Democrats had concluded the coalition agreement with the right of center Croatian Democratic Union and entered into the Cabinet of Andrej Plenković.

Pametno / Centre

- 2015: The party Pametno was formed in Split out of the citizens' initiative Za pametne ljude i pametan grad ("For smart people and a smart city")
- July 2020: The party won a parliamentary seat in the 2020 Croatian parliamentary election, running in a coalition with Focus and Party with a First and Last Name
- November, 2020: following a merger with Dalija Orešković's Party with a First and Last Name, the party Pametno changed name to the ⇒Centre.
- 2021: At the 2021 local elections, the Party candidate Ivica Puljak was elected the Mayor of Split

== Liberal leaders ==
- Svetozar Pribićević
- Savka Dabčević-Kučar
- Dražen Budiša
- Vesna Pusić
- Radimir Čačić
- Anka Mrak-Taritaš
- Ivica Puljak

== Liberal thinkers ==
- Antun Gustav Matoš
- Ante Trumbić
- Ivan Lorković
- Stjepan Radić
- Bogdan Raditsa
- Vlado Gotovac

== See also ==
- History of Croatia
- Politics of Croatia

== Sources ==
- Đurašković, Stevo (May 2005). "Book Review: Tihomir Cipek, Josip Vrandečić (ur.): Hrestomatija liberalnih ideja u Hrvatskoj". Croatian Political Science Review (in Croatian). 41 (3). Faculty of Political Science, University of Zagreb: 182–185. ISSN 1846-8721.
