= Civic Liberal Alliance =

Liberal political party in Croatia

Civic Liberal Alliance Građansko-liberalni savez
- Abbreviation: GLAS
- President: Stanko Borić
- Vice Presidents: Marta Ana Cesar; Stanko Kordić
- Founder: Anka Mrak Taritaš
- Founded: 9 July 2017
- Split from: Croatian People's Party
- Headquarters: Zagreb, Croatia
- Ideology: Liberalism; Social liberalism Pro-Europeanism
- Political position: Centre to centre-left
- National affiliation: Rivers of Justice (since 2020)
- European affiliation: Alliance of Liberals and Democrats for Europe (affiliate member)
- Colours: Light blue
- Sabor: 1 / 151
- European Parliament: 0 / 12
- County Prefects: 0 / 21
- Mayors: 0 / 128

Website
- glas.com.hr

The Civic Liberal Alliance (Croatian: Građansko-liberalni savez, abbr. GLAS – lit. 'Voice/Vote') is a liberal political party in Croatia. The party was founded by four former Croatian People's Party (HNS) MPs led by Anka Mrak Taritaš who were dissatisfied with HNS entering a coalition with the Croatian Democratic Union (HDZ) and supporting the cabinet of Andrej Plenković since June 2017.

== History ==
The Party's founding congress was held on 9 July 2017, while it was officially registered with the Ministry of Public Administration on 26 July 2017.

Glas automatically became a parliamentary party with four MPs, making it the fifth largest party in the country in terms of parliamentary representation. In addition, Jozo Radoš also left HNS and joined Glas, so the party also had one MEP. Radoš sat with the Alliance of Liberals and Democrats for Europe group.

Another notable member is Vesna Pusić.

On 1 December 2017, the party was admitted into the Alliance of Liberals and Democrats for Europe Party as an affiliate member.

The party was one of the founding members of the Amsterdam Coalition, an electoral alliance of seven Croatian liberal political parties. The alliance was founded on 8 December 2018.

== Ideology ==
Party president Mrak-Taritaš described Glas as "a modern, progressive, trans-ideological party in the centre-left, acceptable to people who are liberal, social-liberal and social-democratic." Emphasis is placed on individual freedoms and rights, stable institutions and diversity as a comparative advantage.

Party stands for:

- the right of women to freely choose on abortion,
- extension of LGBT rights and civil rights protections,
- the right to vote at the local elections at the age of 16,
- anti-fascism as the foundation of modern Croatia,
- separation of church and state, strengthening secularization and revision of all four concordats,
- comprehensive curriculum reform,
- removal of parafiscal tax,
- public administration reform,
- a stable judiciary,
- decentralisation.

== Election results ==
=== Presidential ===
Election year(s)	Candidate	1st round		2nd round		Result
Election year(s)	Candidate	Votes	%	Votes	%	Result
2019-20	end. Zoran Milanović (SDP)	562,783	29.91 (#1)	1,034,170	52.66 (#1)	Won
2024-25	end. Zoran Milanović (Ind.)	797,938	49.68 (#1)	1,122,859	74.68 (#1)	Won

=== Legislative ===
Election	In coalition with	Votes won	Percentage	Seats won	Change
Election	In coalition with	(Coalition totals)		(GLAS only)	
2020	Restart Coalition	414,615	24.87%	1 / 151	New
2024	Rivers of Justice	538,748	25.40%	1 / 151	0

=== European Parliament ===
Election	List leader	Coalition	Votes	%	Seats	+/–	EP Group
Election	List leader	Coalition	Coalition		GLAS		EP Group
2019	Valter Flego	Amsterdam Coalition	55,806	5.19 (#5)	0 / 12	New	–
2024	Biljana Borzan	Rivers of Justice	192,859	25.62 (#2)	0 / 12	0	–
