= Marin Miletić =

Croatian politician (born 1979)

Member of the Croatian Parliament
- Incumbent
- Assumed office 22 July 2020
- Constituency: Electoral district VIII

Personal details
- Born: 18 September 1979 (age 46)
- Party: The Bridge

Marin Miletić (born 18 September 1979) is a Croatian politician serving as a member of the Croatian Parliament since 2020. He has served as deputy chairman of the family, youth and sports committee since 2024. He previously worked as a religious teacher and journalist.
