= Alliance of Primorje-Gorski Kotar =

Alliance of Primorje-Gorski Kotar Primorsko-goranski savez
- President: Darijo Vasilić
- Founded: 11 March 1990
- Headquarters: Rijeka, Croatia
- Ideology: Regionalism; Liberalism
- Political position: Centre
- National affiliation: Kukuriku Coalition (2011); Restart Coalition (2020–2023); Amsterdam Coalition (2018–2020); Our Croatia (2023–)
- Colours: Dark blue Green
- Sabor: 0 / 151
- European Parliament: 0 / 12
- County Prefects: 0 / 21
- Mayors: 1 / 128
- Rijeka City Council: 2 / 31

Website
- pgs.hr

The Alliance of Primorje-Gorski Kotar (Croatian: Primorsko-goranski savez or PGS) is a minor Croatian liberal regionalist political party of Primorje-Gorski Kotar County.

They formerly had one representative in the Croatian Parliament in an alliance with the Croatian People's Party.

The party originated from the city of Rijeka under the name of Rijeka Democratic Alliance (Croatian: Riječki demokratski savez, RiDS). After winning a seat in 1992 elections, the party expanded its activities to the rest of Primorje-Gorski Kotar County and changed the name accordingly.

Before the 2007 elections, PGS has announced coalition (joint electoral ticket) with Croatian Peasant Party and Croatian Social Liberal Party.

== Election results ==
=== Legislative ===
Election	Coalition	Votes	%	Seats	+/–	Government
Election	Coalition	Coalition		PGS		Government
1992	IDS-DA	83,623	3.18%	1 / 138	New	Opposition
2000	SDP-HSLS-SBHS	1,138,318	38.70%	2 / 151	▲2	Government
2003	HNS-SBHS	198,781	8.0%	1 / 151	▼1	Opposition
2007	HSS-HSLS-ZDS-ZS	161,814	6.5%	0 / 151	▼1	Extra-parliamentary
2011	BUZ-HRS	66,239	2.8%	0 / 151	0	Extra-parliamentary
2015	IDS-RI	42,193	1.83%	0 / 151	0	Extra-parliamentary
2016	IDS-RI	43,180	2.29%	0 / 151	0	Extra-parliamentary
2020	Restart Coalition	414,645	24.87%	0 / 151	0	Extra-parliamentary
2024	Our Croatia	47,655	2.25%	0 / 151	0	Extra-parliamentary

=== European Parliament ===
Election	List leader	Coalition	Votes	%	Seats	+/–	EP Group
Election	List leader	Coalition	Coalition		PGS		EP Group
2014	Nikica Gabrić	HSLS-RI-NF	22,098	2.40 (#6)	0 / 11	New	–
2019	Valter Flego	Amsterdam Coalition	55,829	5.19 (#6)	0 / 12	0	–
2024	Valter Flego	Fair Play List 9 (Note: Including also IDS, NPS, SDSS, HSLS, HNS, NS-R, SD, D and RI.)	41,710	5.54 (#5)	0 / 12	0	–
