= Croatian Labourists – Labour Party =

Croatian Labourists – Labour Party Hrvatski laburisti – Stranka rada
- Leader: David Bregovac
- Founder: Dragutin Lesar
- Founded: 27 February 2010
- Headquarters: Zagreb, Croatia
- Membership (2013): 9,502 (2013)
- Ideology: Democratic socialism; Social democracy; Left-wing populism; Labourism
- Political position: Centre-left
- National affiliation: Croatia is Growing (2015–2016); Amsterdam Coalition (2018–2020); Our Croatia (2024–)
- European Parliament group: GUE/NGL (2013–2014)
- Colours: Orange
- Sabor: 0 / 151
- European Parliament: 0 / 12

Website
- laburisti.hr

The Croatian Labourists–Labour Party (Croatian: Hrvatski laburisti–Stranka rada) is a centre-left political party in Croatia.

It was formed in 2010 by a former trade unionist and People's Party MP Dragutin Lesar, who was the party's only member of parliament in the 6th assembly.

In the 2011 parliamentary election, the party won six seats in the Croatian Parliament.

Ahead of the 2015 parliamentary election, the party joined the ruling Croatia is Growing coalition with the Social Democratic Party of Croatia and liberal parties. As a result, MP Mladen Novak resigned in protest and joined the green party ORaH.

== Election results ==
=== Legislative ===
Election	Coalition	Votes	%	Seats	+/–	Government
Election	Coalition	Coalition totals		HL only		Government
2011	None	121,785	5.2%	6 / 151	New	Opposition
2015	Croatia is Growing	742,909	33.2%	3 / 151	▼3	Opposition
2016	None	4,821	0.26%	0 / 151	▼3	Extra-parliamentary
2020	D-RI	6,594	0.40%	0 / 151	0	Extra-parliamentary
2024	Our Croatia	47,655	2.25%	0 / 151	0	Extra-parliamentary

=== European Parliament ===
Election	In coalition with	Votes won (coalition totals)	Percentage	Seats won (HL only)	Change
2013	None	42,750	5.77%	1 / 12	▲1
2014	None	31,363	3.40%	0 / 11	▼1
2019	Amsterdam Coalition	55,806	5.19%	0 / 12	Steady

== See also ==
- Left wing politics in Croatia
