= Zagorje Party =

Zagorje Party Zagorska stranka
- Leader: Vacant
- Founded: 10 January 2004
- Split from: Democratic Party of Zagorje
- Headquarters: Zabok, Croatia
- Ideology: Zagorje regionalism
- Political position: Centre to centre-left
- National affiliation: Croatia is Growing (2015–2016)
- Colours: Dark green, Blue
- Sabor: 0 / 151
- European Parliament: 0 / 12

Website
- zagorskastranka.hr

The Zagorje Party (Croatian: Zagorska stranka or ZS) is a regionalist political party in Croatia.

Zagorje Party was founded in Krapina on 10 January 2004 as a split from Democratic Party of Zagorje (ZDS). The party was led by former ZDS secretary Miljenko Jerneić from its foundation until he resigned in May 2024.

Zagorje party is a regional party that is active on the territory of Hrvatsko Zagorje and all of the northwestern Croatia. Party's goal is to gather people from Zagorje, as well as from other parts of Croatia, that are willing to participate in cultural, economic and moral transformation of the northwestern Croatia. It also has a City of Zagreb branch "Zagorje Party for Zagreb" (ZSZ) that ran independently in the 2019 European Parliament election and 2021 Zagreb local elections.

The basic Party principles are "a man and his rights". The party advocates for women's rights, so it accordingly determined that there must be at least 30% of women on all of its electoral lists. An important part of party politics is the policy of sustainable development. Therefore, Party is guided by the principle: "Act locally, think globally". The party advocates separation of church and state, but respects and cherishes the Christian tradition of the Croatian nation.

Party's motto is: "We were born as Zagorci! We live as Zagorci! We will die as Zagorci!"

== Electoral history ==
=== Legislative ===
Election	In coalition with	Votes won (coalition totals)	Percentage	Seats won	Change
2007	HSS-HSLS-PGS-ZDS	161,814	6.5%	0 / 151	Steady
2011	None	1,730	0.07%	0 / 151	Steady
2015	SDP-HNS-HSU-HL-A-HSS	744,507	32.31%	0 / 151	Steady
2016	SU	905	0.05%	0 / 151	Steady

=== European ===
Election	In coalition with	Votes won (coalition totals)	Percentage	Seats won	Change
2019	None	1,128	0.10%	0 / 12	Steady
