= Croatian Party of Pensioners =

Croatian political party

Croatian Party of Pensioners Hrvatska stranka umirovljenika
- Abbreviation: HSU
- Leader: Veselko Gabričević
- Founded: 26 April 1996
- Headquarters: Zagreb, Croatia
- Membership (2024): 4,807
- Ideology: Pensioners' interests (single-issue politics)
- Political position: Centre-left
- National affiliation: Rivers of Justice (2010–2021); Croatian Democratic Union (since 2024)
- Colours: Red; White; Blue
- Sabor: 1 / 151
- European Parliament: 0 / 12

Website
- hsu.hr

The Croatian Party of Pensioners (Croatian: Hrvatska stranka umirovljenika or HSU) is a Croatian centre-left political party that is currently led by Veselko Gabričević.

When the party was founded, few people took it seriously and many commentators speculated that the ultimate purpose of HSU was to take away pensioners' votes from rejuvenated SDP and thus help ruling HDZ remain in power. However, the party gradually built its organisation throughout the country and slowly rose in popularity due to both HDZ and left-centre cabinets of Ivica Račan refusing to honour a Constitutional Court verdict that ordered the government to pay back pensions that had been denied in the early 1990s.

HSU gained much notoriety after local and regional elections in May 2005 when many of its members got elected on left-centre election tickets only to support HDZ and right-wing parties during the forming of coalition governments.

At the 2007 Croatian parliamentary election, the party won 101,091 votes and 4.1% of the votes, but this time the electoral math (D'Hondt method) allowed them to receive only a single representative in the Parliament, Silvano Hrelja. They continued to support the government of Ivo Sanader, which in turn continued to pursue pensioner-related policies aligned with the opinion of the HSU.

In 2009, the economic crisis caused the government of Jadranka Kosor to start talks about extra crisis taxation and after a row with the finance minister Ivan Šuker, the HSU withdrew their support for the government.

The party participated in the Kukuriku coalition since 2011. It continued with the coalition Croatia is Growing at the 2015 Croatian parliamentary election. In that election, it became possible for the candidates of HSU to receive preferential votes, and they won a total of 11,026 (out of a coalition total of 744,507).

== Election results ==
=== Presidential ===
The following is a list of presidential candidates who were endorsed by HSS.

Election year(s)	Candidate	1st round		2nd round		Result
Election year(s)	Candidate	Votes	%	Votes	%	Result
2009–10	end. Ivo Josipović (SDP)	640,594	32.42 (#1)	1,339,385	60.26 (#1)	Won
2014–15	end. Ivo Josipović (SDP)	687,678	39.09 (#1)	1,082,436	49.26 (#2)	Lost
2019–20	end. Zoran Milanović (SDP)	562,783	29.55 (#1)	1,034,170	52.66 (#1)	Won
2024–25	end. Dragan Primorac (Ind.)	314,663	15.59 (#2)	380,752	25.32 (#2)	Lost

=== Legislative ===
Election	Coalition with	Votes	%	Seats	+/–
Election	Coalition with	Coalition		HSU	
2000	None	52,571	1.81%	0 / 151	New
2003	None	98,537	4.0%	3 / 151	▲3
2007	DSU	101,091	4.1%	1 / 151	▼2
2011	Kukuriku Coalition	958,318	41.1%	3 / 151	▲2
2015	Croatia is Growing	742,909	33.2%	2 / 151	▼1
2016	People's Coalition	636,602	33.45%	2 / 151	0
2020	Restart Coalition	414,615	24.87%	1 / 151	▼1
2024	HDZ-HSLS–HNS–HDS	729,949	34.44%	1 / 151	0

=== European Parliament ===
Election	List leader	Coalition	Votes	%	Seats	+/–	EP Group
Election	List leader	Coalition	Coalition		HSU		EP Group
2013	Tonino Picula	Kukuriku Coalition	237,778	32.07 (#2)	0 / 12	New	–
2014	Neven Mimica	Kukuriku Coalition	275,904	29.93 (#2)	0 / 11	0	–
2019	Valter Flego	Amsterdam Coalition	55,806	5.19 (#6)	0 / 12	0	–
2024	Ema Culi	None	5,235	0.70 (#9)	0 / 12	0	–
