= Silvano Hrelja =

Croatian politician (born 1958)

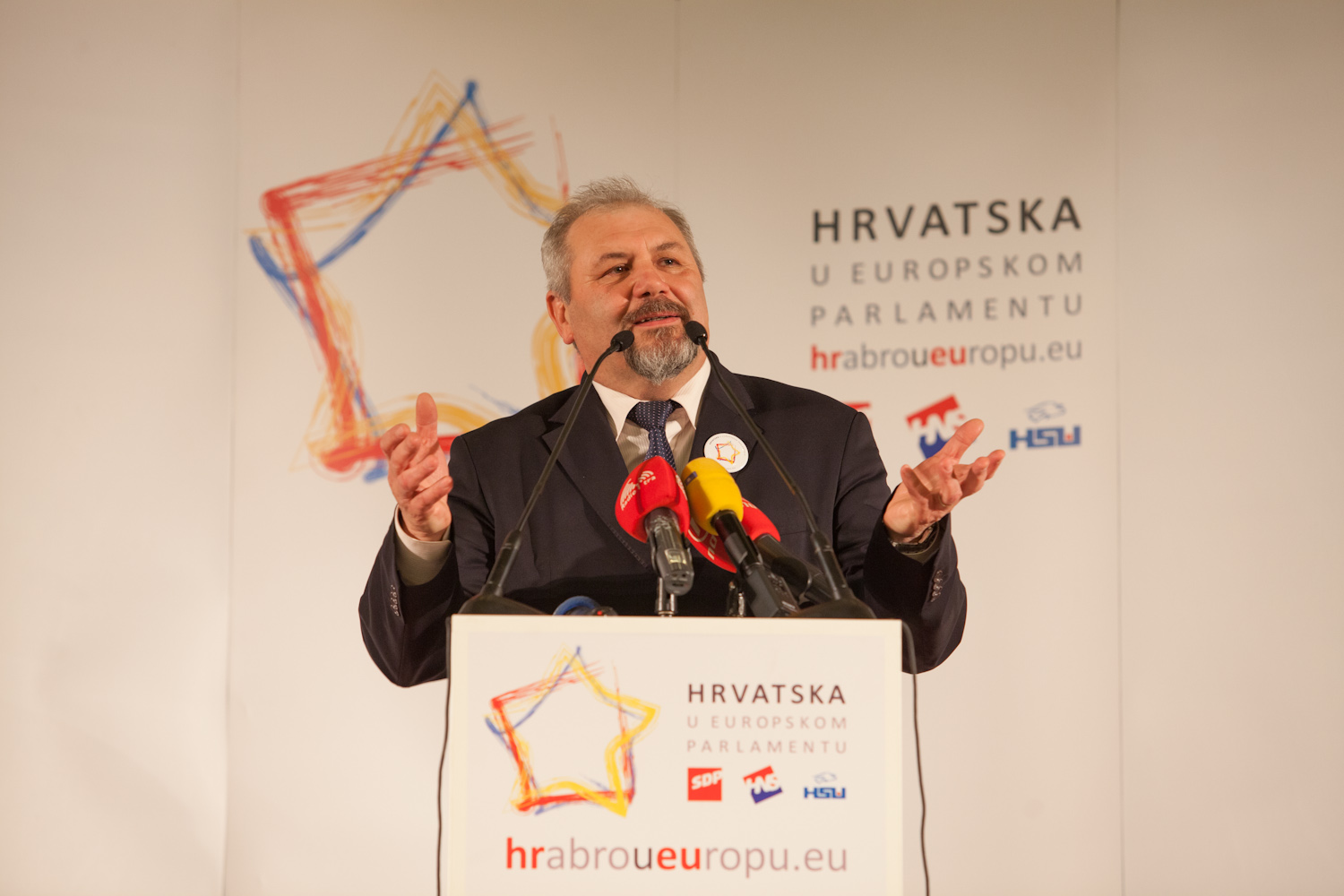
- Hrelja in March 2015

Leader of the Croatian Party of Pensioners
- Incumbent
- Assumed office 14 March 2008

Member of the Croatian Parliament for the 8th electoral district
- Incumbent
- Assumed office 22 December 2003

Personal details
- Born: 14 March 1958 (age 68) Žminj, PR Croatia, Yugoslavia (now Croatia)
- Party: Croatian Party of Pensioners
- Education: College of Occupational Safety and Health

Silvano Hrelja (born 14 March 1958) is a Croatian politician who has been Leader of the Croatian Party of Pensioners (HSU) since 2008 and a member of the Croatian Parliament for the VIII electoral district since 2003 having been elected in the 2003, 2007, 2011 and 2015 parliamentary elections.

== Early life and education ==
Silvano Hrelja was born in a small village of Hreljani near Žminj in Istria. He finished Zagreb Electrical Engineering High School, after which he graduated from the Zagreb College of Occupational Safety and Health gaining professional title of engineer of safety at work and fire protection. After graduation, Hrelja worked in Uljanik shipyard controlling safety at work. During this period, he became active in the Croatian Metal Workers Union (SMH), becoming the Commissioner of Trade Unions in Uljanik, and then regional and county commissioner of SMH for Istria.

== Political career ==
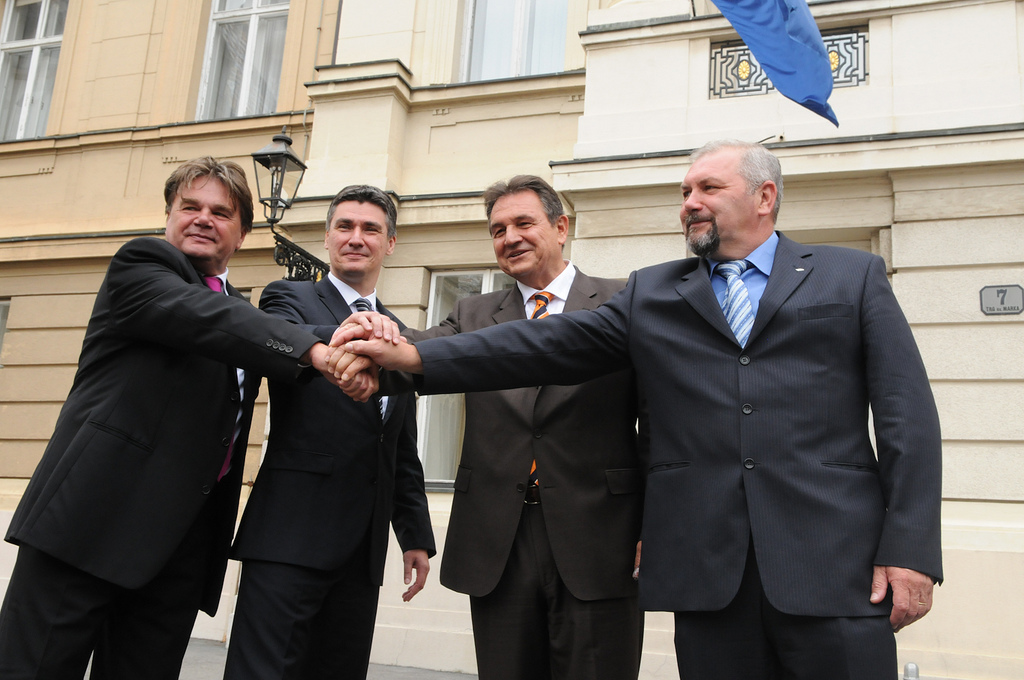
Ivan Jakovčić, Zoran Milanović, Radimir Čačić and Silvano Hrelja announcing the creation of Kukuriku coalition, 2011

He got involved in politics in year 2003, when he got elected to the Croatian parliament. In that year, he also became Vice President of HSU, and president of the HSU Istrian county organization. In 2007, Hrelja managed to keep his seat in the Parliament, thus becoming the only HSU MP. He supported II Cabinet of Ivo Sanader. At the 7th General Assembly of HSU that was held on March 14, 2008, he was elected President of the Party with votes of 169 out of 330 delegates.

In year 2010, he participated in the creation of the center-left Kukuriku coalition. He was reelected to the Parliament in the 2011 and 2015 parliamentary elections. In both terms, he supported Zoran Milanović (SDP) as candidate for the Prime Minister.

At the 11th General Assembly of HSu that was held on May 6, 2016, Hrelja was re-elected as president of the HSU.

== Personal life ==
Mr. Hrelja is married with two children. He actively participated in Operation Storm during the Yugoslav Wars.
