= Parafiscal tax =

A parafiscal tax is a tax on a specific product or service by which a government levies money for a certain purpose. The money raised is usually paid to a body other than the national tax authority.

In the European Union, one type of parafiscal charges (or parafiscal levies) is levied “by public or private agencies on the production or marketing of agricultural products with a view to financing activities for the benefit of the sector as a whole”.
