= Anka Mrak-Taritaš =

Croatian politician and architect

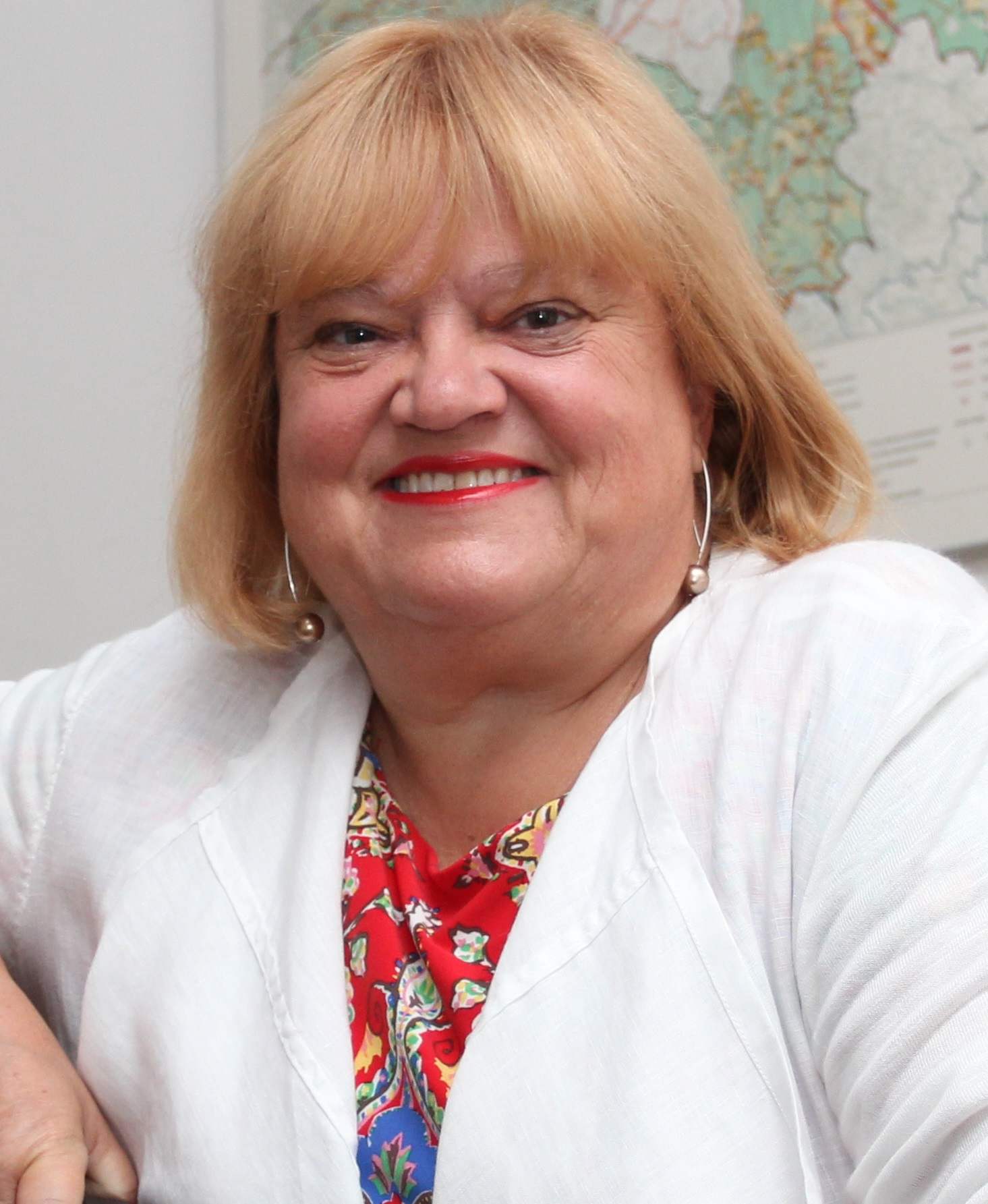

President of the Civic Liberal Alliance
- In office 9 July 2017 – 21 November 2024
- Preceded by: Position established
- Succeeded by: Stanko Borić

Member of the Croatian Parliament
- Incumbent
- Assumed office 14 October 2016
- Constituency: II electoral district

Minister of Construction and Spatial Planning
- In office 16 November 2012 – 22 January 2016
- Prime Minister: Zoran Milanović
- Preceded by: Ivan Vrdoljak
- Succeeded by: Lovro Kuščević

Personal details
- Born: Anka Mrak; 24 November 1959 (age 66) Bjelovar, PR Croatia, FPR Yugoslavia
- Party: Croatian People's Party (2012–2017); Civic Liberal Alliance (2017–present)
- Spouse: Zlatko Taritaš
- Children: 2
- Education: University of Zagreb
- Occupation: Architect; politician

Anka Mrak-Taritaš (born 24 November 1959) is a Croatian politician and architect who has been member of the Croatian Parliament for the II electoral district since the 2016 parliamentary election, and a member of the Zagreb Assembly since 2017. Between 2012 and 2016, she was Minister of Construction and Spatial Planning in the center-left cabinet of Zoran Milanović. Mrak-Taritaš was the president of the Civic Liberal Alliance party from 9 July 2017 to 21 November 2024.

== Early life and education ==
Anka Mrak-Taritaš was born on November 24, 1959, in Bjelovar, where she finished elementary and high school. She graduated in 1983 from the Zagreb Faculty of Architecture. In 2002, she took courses in building permits and legislative frameworks in Finland and Germany. In 2006, she passed the training course for teachers on Strategic Environmental Impact Assessment. In 2008, Mrak Taritaš gained her doctorate with thesis: "Analysis of the quantification of indicators of planning tourist zones within the protected coastal zone".

== Working experience ==
After graduation, Mrak-Taritaš worked for a year on creating major projects for the Zagreb University Hospital and the ACI marina on the Adriatic. From 15 August 1984 until 15 December 1992, she worked as an intern at the Committee for Planning and Building of the Trnje district, on various jobs in the field of spatial planning and construction, including issuing conditions for spatial planning, building permits and use permits, as well as technical inspection.

On 16 December 1992, she became Head of the Department for Coordination of National, Regional and Local Planning in the Department of Spatial Planning at the Ministry of Environmental Protection, Spatial Planning and Construction. She was consulted for spatial planning.

From 12 July 2005 until 13 October 2005, Mrak Taritaš served as Head of the Institute for Development Planning and Environmental Protection of Zagreb. On 13 October 2005, Mrak-Taritaš become Head of Department of Spatial Planning of the Ministry of Construction and Spatial Planning. She also participated in committees evaluating environmental impact as Deputy President of the commission, and in the working group for preparation of negotiations on amendments to bilateral international treaties that Croatia concluded with Bosnia and Herzegovina, Montenegro and Serbia.

After the Kukuriku coalition won the 2011 parliamentary elections, Mrak-Taritaš was appointed Deputy Minister of Construction and Spatial Planning alongside Minister Ivan Vrdoljak. After Radimir Čačić, Minister of Economy, resigned and Vrdoljak took his place, Mrak-Taritaš was appointed minister. Her biggest success as minister was the enactment of the Law on the Legalization of Illegally Constructed Buildings which helped in legalizing 100,000 buildings which were constructed without any building permit or with templates of otherwise issued building permits.

== Political career ==
Mrak-Taritaš was a member of the Croatian People's Party – Liberal Democrats from 2012 until June 2017 when she and three other HNS's MPs left the party when it entered a coalition agreement with conservative Croatian Democratic Union party. In the 2015 parliamentary elections, she received 8,047 preferential votes, thus becoming a member of the Croatian Parliament. She was re-elected to the Parliament in the 2016 parliamentary elections. Mrak-Taritaš was HNS's and SDP's candidate for Mayor of Zagreb in the 2017 local elections and eventually finished second.

== Private life ==
She is married and has two sons. She is a non-practicing Catholic.
