= Croatian People's Party – Liberal Democrats =

Croatian liberal political party

Croatian People's Party – Liberal Democrats Hrvatska narodna stranka – Liberalni demokrati
- Abbreviation: HNS, HNS-LD
- President: Krunoslav Lukačić
- Founder: Savka Dabčević-Kučar
- Founded: 13 October 1990
- Headquarters: Zagreb
- Membership (2022): 31,793
- Ideology: Social liberalism Pro-Europeanism
- Political position: Centre
- National affiliation: Rivers of Justice (Note: Kukuriku Coalition (2010–2015); Croatia is Growing (2015–2016); People's Coalition (2016–2017)) (2010–2017); Croatian Democratic Union (coalition since 2024)
- Regional affiliation: Liberal South East European Network
- European affiliation: Alliance of Liberals and Democrats for Europe (affiliate member)
- Colours: Orange
- Sabor: 1 / 151
- European Parliament: 0 / 12
- County Prefects: 0 / 21
- Mayors: 0 / 128

Website
- hns.hr

The Croatian People's Party – Liberal Democrats (Croatian: Hrvatska narodna stranka – Liberalni demokrati or HNS) is a social-liberal political party in Croatia.

In the 11th Sabor, since 2024, a single HNS representative forms a parliamentary club together with two independent representatives. HNS is an affiliate member of the Alliance of Liberals and Democrats for Europe Party.

== Origins ==
The People's Party in Croatia was originally formed in 1841, during the period of Croatian romantic nationalism. The Croatian People's Party describes the events of the Illyrian movement since 1835 as its history.. After 1861 the People's Party was known as the People's Liberal Party, its main splinter party was the Independent People's Party (1880–1903) which became more pro-autonomist, while the "old" People's Party developed into "party of the Settlement" having collaborated with the pro-Hungarian Unionist Party (known as the People's Constitutional Party). The Progressive Party (1904–1906) and the Croatian People's Progressive Party (1906–1910) were also liberal parties in the Kingdom of Croatia-Slavonia as an autonomous part of the Austro-Hungarian Empire.

In 1860, the national liberals formed in the Dalmatia (Austrian part of the Austro-Hungarian Empire) the National party known also as the People's Party in Dalmatia. The party developed into a conservative party around 1889 (the National Croatian Party).

In the first Yugoslavia (1918–1941), main liberal party was the Independent Democratic Party composed by the Serbs from former Austro-Hungarian parts of the new state and Slovene centralist liberals.

During Communism in the second Yugoslavia (the Socialist Republic of Croatia, SRH), the liberal leaders of the League of Communists of Croatia were Savka Dabčević-Kučar and Miko Tripalo, who participated in the Croatian Spring of 1971.

== Modern party ==
The modern Croatian People's Party was formed in late 1990 by members of the Coalition of People's Accord (Croatian: Koalicija narodnog sporazuma) which had participated on the first multi-party election of 1990, led by Savka Dabčević-Kučar, Miko Tripalo, Dragutin Haramija and others.

The HNS remained a small opposition party. In the 1992 election they won 6.7% of the vote and attained 6 seats in the Croatian Parliament. In 1994, construction entrepreneur Radimir Čačić became party chairman. In the 1995 election they won 2 seats as part of an election alliance.

In the January 2000 election, they formed a four-party coalition with HSS, LS and IDS, which together won 25 seats in the Parliament, two of whom were HNS representatives. As a result, the party participated in the 2000–2003 government of Ivica Račan through the minister of public works, construction and reconstruction Radimir Čačić. A few weeks later, the coalition's candidate and HNS member Stjepan Mesić was elected President of the Republic.

Also in 2000, HNS elected a new party chair, Zagreb University professor of sociology of politics Vesna Pusić.

In the November 2003 elections, their alliance with the Alliance of Primorje-Gorski Kotar and the Slavonia-Baranja Croatian Party won 8% of the vote and 11 out of 151 seats, 10 of them HNS representatives. However, despite significantly improved results, the party moved to the opposition.

A second element of today's People's Party, the Party of Liberal Democrats or Libra, originated in time of the Račan government when in 2002 Dražen Budiša, the leader of the Croatian Social Liberal Party (HSLS), pulled out of the coalition. Ten members of parliament from Budiša's party, led by Jozo Radoš, refused to bring down the government and instead split from the HSLS, forming Libra, the Party of Liberal Democrats. That party won 3 seats in the 2003 election. On 6 February 2005, most of the 1,250 representatives of HNS on its seventh convention voted to merge with Libra as the Croatian People's Party – Liberal Democrats. The total number of parliamentary seats for the party increased to 13.

In the November 2007 elections, the party ran on its own and got around 7% of the vote and 7 seats in the Croatian Sabor. It remained in the opposition. In April 2008 Radimir Čačić was elected as party chair after defeating Dragutin Lesar (MP). Lesar left the party, first acting as an independent MP, but then founded a splinter party, Croatian Laburists in March 2010. Zlatko Horvat MP left the party as well.

In the 2011 elections, HNS participated in centre-left Kukuriku coalition spearheaded by SDP. After the coalition won, HNS entered the cabinet and held posts of foreign relations, commerce, culture etc. Čačić was reelected as a party chairman again in March 2012. After he was sentenced to a prison term due to a traffic accident in which two people died, he resigned from the cabinet and was forced to leave the party. Vesna Pusić was elected as party president in 2013. On 21 September 2014 about 200 members from HNS Zagreb and Varaždin branches each left the party in order to form liberal and centrist People's Party - Reformists under Radimir Čačić's leadership.

HNS held the same alliance in the parliamentary elections of 2015 and 2016 as a part of SDP-led People's coalition, switching to opposition. After the party chairman Ivan Vrdoljak and the party's general board decided to enter the government with centre-right Croatian Democratic Union (HDZ) and support Andrej Plenkovic's cabinet in the parliament (overriding the opposition of party's presidency), in June 2017, four MPs and the only MEP (Jozo Radoš) left the party to create left of the centre Civic Liberal Alliance. This splinter also resulted in numerous party members and branch leaders leaving the party, either to join Civic Liberal Alliance or other parties. In October 2018, MP Marija Puh left the party fraction in the parliament to join Milan Bandic's party, reducing the fraction further down to just four MPs.

In the run-up to the 2024 Croatian parliamentary election, HNS-LD decided to run together with HDZ, nominating a total of 4 candidates in 4 electoral units.

== Chairpersons of the party ==
#	Name	In office
1	Savka Dabčević-Kučar	1990–1995
2	Radimir Čačić	1995–2000
3	Vesna Pusić	2000–2008
4	Radimir Čačić	2008–2013
5	Vesna Pusić	2013–2016
6	Ivan Vrdoljak	2016–2017
—	Predrag Štromar	2017 (Acting)
7	Ivan Vrdoljak	2017–2020
8	Predrag Štromar	2020
9	Stjepan Čuraj	2020–2022
—	Mirko Korotaj	2022–2024 (Acting)
10	Krunoslav Lukačić	2024–present

== Election results ==
=== Legislative ===
The following is a summary of the party's results in legislative elections for the Croatian parliament. The "Total votes" and "Percentage" columns include sums of votes won by pre-election coalitions HNS had been part of. After preferential votes were added to the electoral system, the votes column also includes the statistic of the total number of such votes received by candidates of HNS on coalition lists. The "Total seats" column includes sums of seats won by HNS in election constituencies plus representatives of ethnic minorities affiliated with HNS.

Election	In coalition with	Votes won	Percentage	Seats won	Change	Government
Election	In coalition with	(Coalition totals)		(HNS only)		Government
1992	None	176,214	6.67	6 / 138	New	Opposition
1995	HSS–IDS–HKDU–SBHS	441,390	18.26	2 / 127	▼4	Opposition
2000	HSS–IDS–LS–ASH	432,527	14.70	2 / 151	0	Government
2003	PGS–SBHS	198,781	8.00	10 / 151	▲8	Opposition
2007	None	168,440	6.80	7 / 153	▼3	Opposition
2011	SDP–IDS–HSU	958,312	40.00	14 / 151	▲7	Government
2015	SDP–HSU–HL–AHSS–ZS	744,507 (84,002)	32.31	9 / 151	▼5	Opposition
2016	SDP–HSU–HSS	636,960 (84,581)	33.47	9 / 151	0	Opposition (2016–17)
2016	SDP–HSU–HSS	636,960 (84,581)	33.47	9 / 151	0	Government (2017–20)
2020	None	21,725	1.30	1 / 151	▼8	Government support
2024	HDZ–HSLS–HDS–HSU	729,949 (3,974)	34.44	1 / 151	0	Government support

=== European Parliament ===
Election	List leader	Coalition	Votes	%	Seats	+/–	EP Group
Election	List leader	Coalition	Coalition		HNS		EP Group
2013	Tonino Picula	SDP–HSU	237,778	32.07 (#2)	0 / 12	New	–
2014	Neven Mimica	SDP–HSU-IDS-SDSS	275,904	29.93 (#2)	1 / 11	▲1	ALDE
2019	Matija Posavec	None	27,958	2.60 (#9)	0 / 12	▼1	–
2024	Valter Flego	Fair Play List 9 (Note: Including also IDS, NPS, SDSS, HSLS, NS-R, SD, D, PGS and RI.)	41,710	5.54 (#5)	0 / 12	0	–

=== Presidential ===
The following is a list of presidential candidates who were endorsed by HNS in elections for President of Croatia.

Election	Candidate	First round result		Second round result	
Election	Candidate	Votes	Rank	Votes	Result
1992 (Aug)	Savka Dabčević-Kučar (HNS)	6.0%	Third	—	
1997 (Jun)	Vlado Gotovac (HSLS)	17.6%	Third	—	
2000 (Jan–Feb)	Stjepan Mesić (HNS)	41.1%	First	56.0%	Won
2005 (Jan)	Stjepan Mesić (Ind.)	48.9%	First	65.9%	Won
2009–10 (Dec–Jan)	Vesna Pusić (HNS)	7.3%	Fifth	—	
2014–15 (Dec–Jan)	Ivo Josipović (Ind.)	38.5%	First	49.3%	Lost
2019–20 (Dec–Jan)	Kolinda Grabar-Kitarović (HDZ)	26.7%	Runner-up	47.3%	Lost
2024–25 (Dec–Jan)	Dragan Primorac (Ind.)	15.6%	Runner-up	25.3%	Lost

== See also ==
- List of political parties in Croatia
- List of liberal parties
- Liberalism in Croatia
