= Valter Flego =

Croatian politician, prefect of Istria County

Valter Flego MEP
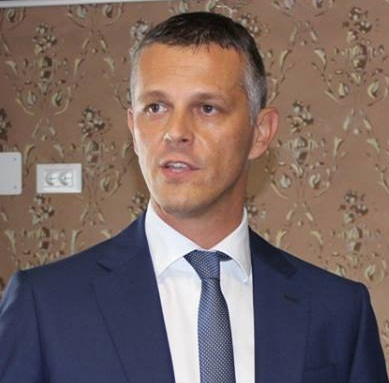

Member of the European Parliament for Croatia
- In office 2 July 2019 – 15 July 2024

Prefect of the Istria County
- In office 7 June 2013 – 2 July 2019
- Preceded by: Ivan Jakovčić
- Succeeded by: Fabrizio Radin

Mayor of Buzet
- In office 2001–2013
- Succeeded by: Siniša Žulić

Personal details
- Born: 15 August 1972 (age 54) Koper, SR Slovenia, SFR Yugoslavia (modern Slovenia)
- Party: Croatian; Istrian Democratic Assembly; EU; Renew Europe (2019–2024)
- Spouse: Branka Flego (m. 2002)
- Children: 2
- Education: University of Rijeka
- Profession: Politician; mechanical engineer

Valter Flego (born 15 August 1972) is a Croatian politician who was a Member of the European Parliament for Croatia from 2 July 2019 to 15 July 2024. Previously he had served as the 4th prefect of Istria County from 2013 to 2019, as well as serving three terms as mayor of the town of Buzet. He is a member of the liberal Istrian Democratic Assembly (IDS) party.

== Early life and education ==
He finished elementary school and first two years of high school in Buzet, and 3rd and 4th grade in Rijeka. After graduating from high school, he earned the qualification for a machine technician. In 1991 he enrolled in the study of mechanical engineering in the University of Rijeka, where he graduated in 1996 with special honors and became a mechanical engineer. During his studies he received the Rector's Award of the University of Rijeka as the best student of the Technical Faculty as well as the Truffle Award for Excellence in curricular and extracurricular activities from the town of Buzet.

== Career ==
After finishing studies, Flego got a job in the company Istrian waterworks, and at the same time enrolled in the postgraduate studies on the Rijeka Faculty of Economics which he finished in year 2000 acquiring a scientific master's degree in economics.

After 2001 local elections Flego became the Mayor of Buzet. After 2005 local elections he was unanimously re-elected mayor by the city council. At the first direct local elections that were held in 2009 Flego received over 84% of the voters, thus achieving the best result out of all candidates for mayor in Croatia.

In 2013 local elections Flego, who had support from IDS-HNS-LD-Green party, ran against Damir Kajin, who had support of SDP-HSU-SDSS-HSLS, for the position of Prefect of Istrian county. Eventually he won with 47,25% to 36,24% of votes.

== Personal life ==
Flego married Branka Flego, an elementary school teacher, in 2002. They have two sons, Dinko and Ivo.
