= List of members of the Sabor, 2024–present =

The eleventh Sabor was inaugurated on 16 May 2024. The assembly came into existence following the early parliamentary election on 17 April 2024 and consists of 151 representatives elected from 10 geographical and two special electoral districts.

== Parliamentary officials ==
The Speaker of the Croatian Parliament Gordan Jandroković was elected on 16 May 2024 by 144 votes for and 6 against.

There are currently five deputy speakers of Sabor, three from the government majority: former Speaker Željko Reiner (HDZ), Ivan Penava (DP) and Armin Hodžić (BZ), while the opposition deputy speakers are Sabina Glasovac (SDP) and Mišel Jakšić (SDP). Furio Radin (Italian minority representative) retired from being an MP on 25 June 2026.

== Composition ==
Following the original composition after the 2024 parliamentary election and subsequent changes, the composition of the Sabor as of October 2026 is as follows. National minority MPs can join one other club in addition to the National minorities group.

=== By parliamentary club ===
Parliamentary clubs	Oct 2026
Croatian Democratic Union (HDZ)	58
Social Democratic Party of Croatia (SDP)	34
We Can! (Možemo!)	10
Homeland Movement (DP)	8
The Bridge (Most)	7
National minorities club	7
Centre (Centar), Independent Platform of the North (NPS) and Civic Liberal Alliance (GLAS)	5
Home and National Rally (DOMiNO) and Croatian Sovereignists (HS)	4
Croatian Peasant Party (HSS), Croatian People's Party (HNS) and an independent MP	3
Croatian Social Liberal Party (HSLS) and an independent MP	3
Istrian Democratic Assembly (IDS), Alliance of Primorje-Gorski Kotar (PGS), Union of Kvarner (UK) and Istrian Party of Pensioners (ISU)	3
Independents MPs (Note: Drito and Dario Zurovec - Independent List)	3
Independent Democratic Serb Party (SDSS)	3
Independents (Nezavisni) and Croatian Party of Pensioners (HSU)	3

=== MPs by party ===
Party	Name	Constituency/Deputizing
Croatian Democratic Union (55)	Krešimir Ačkar	District I
Croatian Democratic Union (55)	Ante Babić	District IX, deputizing Šime Erlić
Croatian Democratic Union (55)	Nikolina Baradić	District IX, deputizing Josip Bilaver
Croatian Democratic Union (55)	Vesna Bedeković	District IV, deputizing Igor Andrović
Croatian Democratic Union (55)	Anamarija Blažević	District V, deputizing Antonija Jozić
Croatian Democratic Union (55)	Josip Borić	District VIII, deputizing Oleg Butković
Croatian Democratic Union (55)	Ivan Budalić	District X, deputizing Blaženko Boban
Croatian Democratic Union (55)	Majda Burić	District VII, deputizing Tomo Medved
Croatian Democratic Union (55)	Zdravka Bušić	District II, deputizing Gordan Grlić Radman
Croatian Democratic Union (55)	Pero Ćosić	District V
Croatian Democratic Union (55)	Ante Deur	District II
Croatian Democratic Union (55)	Josip Đakić	District IV
Croatian Democratic Union (55)	Ljubica Jembrih	District III, Damir Habijan
Croatian Democratic Union (55)	Goran Ivanović	District IV
Croatian Democratic Union (55)	Gordan Jandroković	District II
Croatian Democratic Union (55)	Branka Juričev-Martinčev	District IX
Croatian Democratic Union (55)	Krunoslav Katičić	District II
Croatian Democratic Union (55)	Tomislav Klarić	District VIII
Croatian Democratic Union (55)	Anton Kliman	District VIII
Croatian Democratic Union (55)	Magdalena Komes	District VII, deputizing Ivan Celjak
Croatian Democratic Union (55)	Andro Krstulović Opara	District X
Croatian Democratic Union (55)	Marin Mandarić	District IV, deputizing Ivan Anušić
Croatian Democratic Union (55)	Nikola Mažar	District V
Croatian Democratic Union (55)	Marko Pavić	District VI, deputizing Davor Božinović
Croatian Democratic Union (55)	Željko Reiner	District I
Croatian Democratic Union (55)	Ante Sanader	District IX
Croatian Democratic Union (55)	Darko Sobota	District IV
Croatian Democratic Union (55)	Željko Turk	District VI, deputizing Davor Ivo Stier
Croatian Democratic Union (55)	Josip Šarić	District V, deputizing Marin Piletić
Croatian Democratic Union (55)	Miro Totgergeli	District II
Croatian Democratic Union (55)	Nataša Tramišak	District IV
Croatian Democratic Union (55)	Radoje Vidović	District XI
Croatian Democratic Union (55)	Ljubica Lukačić	District I, deputizing Andrej Plenković
Croatian Democratic Union (55)	Maksimilijan Šimrak	District I, deputizing Nina Obuljen Koržinek
Croatian Democratic Union (55)	Ivan Radić	District IV
Croatian Democratic Union (55)	Ivan Bosančić	District V
Croatian Democratic Union (55)	Sanda Lidija Maduna	District V, deputing Danijel Marušić
Croatian Democratic Union (55)	Željko Glavić	District V
Croatian Democratic Union (55)	Danijela Blažanović	District VI, deputing Vili Beroš
Croatian Democratic Union (55)	Mislav Herman	District VI
Croatian Democratic Union (55)	Damir Mandić	District VII, deputing Martina Furdek-Hajdin
Croatian Democratic Union (55)	Ivan Dabo	District VII, deputing Ernest Petry
Croatian Democratic Union (55)	Anđelka Salopek	District VII, deputing Nikolina Brnjac
Croatian Democratic Union (55)	Josip Ostrogović	District VIII
Croatian Democratic Union (55)	Ivan Malenica	District IX
Croatian Democratic Union (55)	Ivan Bugarin	District IX
Croatian Democratic Union (55)	Dalibor Milan	District X, deputizing Branko Bačić
Croatian Democratic Union (55)	Danica Baričević	District X, deputizing Damir Krstičević
Croatian Democratic Union (55)	Tomislav Šuta	District X
Croatian Democratic Union (55)	Mato Franković	District X
Croatian Democratic Union (55)	Jasna Vojnić	District XI, deputizing Zvonko Milas
Croatian Democratic Union (55)	Dario Pušić	District XI
Croatian Democratic Union (55)	Goran Kaniški	District III, deputizing Anđelko Stričak
Croatian Democratic Union (55)	Zoran Gregurović	District III
Croatian Democratic Union (55)	Ljubomir Kolarek	District III
Social Democratic Party of Croatia (37)	Mirela Ahmetović	District VIII
Social Democratic Party of Croatia (37)	Barbara Antolić Vupora	District III
Social Democratic Party of Croatia (37)	Boška Ban Vlahek	District III
Social Democratic Party of Croatia (37)	Arsen Bauk	District I
Social Democratic Party of Croatia (37)	Sabina Glasovac	District IX
Social Democratic Party of Croatia (37)	Peđa Grbin	District VIII
Social Democratic Party of Croatia (37)	Siniša Hajdaš Dončić	District III
Social Democratic Party of Croatia (37)	Mišel Jakšić	District IV
Social Democratic Party of Croatia (37)	Boris Lalovac	District II
Social Democratic Party of Croatia (37)	Sanja Radolović	District VIII
Social Democratic Party of Croatia (37)	Martina Vlašić Iljkić	District V
Social Democratic Party of Croatia (37)	Branko Kolarić	District I
Social Democratic Party of Croatia (37)	Tanja Sokolić	District II
Social Democratic Party of Croatia (37)	Tomislav Golubić	District II
Social Democratic Party of Croatia (37)	Anita Curiš Krok	District III, deputizing Željko Kolar
Social Democratic Party of Croatia (37)	Miroslav Marković	District III
Social Democratic Party of Croatia (37)	Jasenka Auguštan-Pentek	District III
Social Democratic Party of Croatia (37)	Mate Vukušić	District IV, deputizing Biljana Borzan
Social Democratic Party of Croatia (37)	Sanja Bježančević	District IV
Social Democratic Party of Croatia (37)	Boris Piližota	District IV
Social Democratic Party of Croatia (37)	Marko Krička	District V, deputizing Predrag Fred Matić
Social Democratic Party of Croatia (37)	Mario Milinković	District V
Social Democratic Party of Croatia (37)	Mihael Zmajlović	District VI
Social Democratic Party of Croatia (37)	Marija Lugarić	District VI
Social Democratic Party of Croatia (37)	Ivan Račan	District VI
Social Democratic Party of Croatia (37)	Kristina Ikić Baniček	District VII
Social Democratic Party of Croatia (37)	Ivica Lukanović	District VII
Social Democratic Party of Croatia (37)	Sandra Krpan	District VII
Social Democratic Party of Croatia (37)	Dalibor Domitrović	District VII
Social Democratic Party of Croatia (37)	Željko Jovanović	District VIII, deputizing Zlatko Komadina
Social Democratic Party of Croatia (37)	Saša Đujić	District VIII
Social Democratic Party of Croatia (37)	Ana Puž Kukuljan	District VIII
Social Democratic Party of Croatia (37)	Tonči Restović	District IX
Social Democratic Party of Croatia (37)	Irena Dragić	District IX
Social Democratic Party of Croatia (37)	Ranko Ostojić	District X
Social Democratic Party of Croatia (37)	Mišo Krstičević	District X
Social Democratic Party of Croatia (37)	Ivana Marković	District X
We can! (10)	Sandra Benčić	District I
We can! (10)	Urša Raukar-Gamulin	District VI
We can! (10)	Ivana Kekin	District I
We can! (10)	Damir Bakić	District I
We can! (10)	Jelena Miloš	District II, deputizing Danijela Dolenec
We can! (10)	Dubravka Novak	District III, deputizing Luka Korlaet
We can! (10)	Rada Borić	District VI, deputizing Tomislav Tomašević
We can! (10)	Marin Živković	District VI, deputizing Gordan Bosanac
We can! (10)	Draženka Polović	District VII
We can! (10)	Dušica Radojčić	District VIII
Homeland Movement (8)	Ivica Mesić	District II, deputizing Stephen Nikola Bartulica
Homeland Movement (8)	Stipo Mlinarić	District X
Homeland Movement (8)	Ivan Penava	District V
Homeland Movement (8)	Tomislav Josić	District II
Homeland Movement (8)	Ivana Mujkić	District V, deputizing Josip Dabro
Homeland Movement (8)	Dubravka Lipovac Pehar	District V
Homeland Movement (8)	Ive Ćaleta-Car	District IX, deputizing Ivan Šipić
Homeland Movement (8)	Ivica Kukavica	District X
The Bridge (7)	Miro Bulj	District IX
The Bridge (7)	Nikola Grmoja	District VI
The Bridge (7)	Ante Kujundžić	District X
The Bridge (7)	Ivan Matić	District IX
The Bridge (7)	Marin Miletić	District VIII
The Bridge (7)	Božo Petrov	District X
The Bridge (7)	Zvonimir Troskot	District VII
Home and National Rally (3)	Krešimir Čabaj	District IV, deputizing Mario Radić
Home and National Rally (3)	Igor Peternel	District VI
Home and National Rally (3)	Damir Biloglav	District IX
Independent Democratic Serb Party (3)	Dragana Jeckov	District XII
Independent Democratic Serb Party (3)	Anja Šimpraga	District XII
Independent Democratic Serb Party (3)	Milorad Pupovac	District XII
Istrian Democratic Assembly (2)	Dalibor Paus	District VIII
Istrian Democratic Assembly (2)	Loris Peršurić	District VIII
Croatian Social Liberal Party (2)	Dario Hrebak	District II
Croatian Social Liberal Party (2)	Darko Klasić	District I
Independent Platform of the North (2)	Ivica Baksa	District III, deputizing Matija Posavec
Independent Platform of the North (2)	Dubravko Bilić	District III
Centre (2)	Marijana Puljak	District I
Centre (2)	Viktorija Knežević	District X, deputizing Ivica Puljak
Croatian Sovereignists (1)	Marijan Pavliček	District V
Croatian Peasant Party (1)	Krešo Beljak	District VI
Croatian Demochristian Party (1)	Hrvoje Zekanović	District IX
Civic Liberal Alliance (1)	Anka Mrak-Taritaš	District II
Croatian People's Party – Liberal Democrats (1)	Predrag Štromar	District III
Dalija Orešković and People with a First and Last Name (1)	Dalija Orešković	District I
Croatian Party of Pensioners (1)	Veselko Gabričević	District VII
Democratic Union of Hungarians of Croatia (1) (Note: The MP is a party member but is listed as independent on Sabor website)	Róbert Jankovics	District XII
Kali Sara (1)	Veljko Kajtazi	District XII
Bosniaks together! (1)	Armin Hodžić	District XII
Independents (9)	Dario Zurovec	District VI, elected on Focus list
Independents (9)	Ivan Šipić	District IX, member of DP club
Independents (9)	Josip Jurčević	District VII, elected on DP-PiP list
Independents (9)	Vesna Vučemilović	District IV, elected on Most-HS list
Independents (9)	Nino Raspudić	District II, elected od Most-HS list
Independents (9)	Željko Lacković	District IV
Independents (9)	Vladimir Bilek	District XII
Independents (9)	Marijana Petir	District VII
Independents (9)	Furio Radin	District XII
Independents (9)	Marija Selak Raspudić	District I, elected on Most-HS list

=== Changes ===
Changes of MP occurred after official results of elections:

Party	Name	Constituency/Deputizing	Status	Date	Note
Croatian Democratic Union	Damir Habijan	District III	dormant	16 May 2024	appointed as Minister of Justice and Public Administration
Croatian Democratic Union	Anđelko Stričak	District VIII	dormant	16 May 2024	incompatible duty, prefect of Varaždin County
Croatian Democratic Union	Andrej Plenković	District I	dormant	16 May 2024	appointed as Prime Minister
Croatian Democratic Union	Nina Obuljen Koržinek	District I	dormant	16 May 2024	appointed as Minister of Culture and Media
Croatian Democratic Union	Gordan Grlić Radman	District II	dormant	16 May 2024	appointed as Minister of Foreign and European Affairs
Croatian Democratic Union	Ivan Anušić	District IV	dormant	16 May 2024	appointed as Minister of Defence
Croatian Democratic Union	Igor Andrović	District IV	dormant	16 May 2024	incompatible duty, prefect of Virovitica-Podravina County
Croatian Democratic Union	Marin Piletić	District V	dormant	16 May 2024	appointed as Minister of Labour and Pension System, Family and Social Policy
Croatian Democratic Union	Antonija Jozić	District V	dormant	16 May 2024	incompatible duty, prefect of Požega-Slavonia County
Croatian Democratic Union	Danijel Marušić	District V	dormant	16 May 2024	incompatible duty, prefect of Brod-Posavina County
Croatian Democratic Union	Davor Božinović	District VI	dormant	16 May 2024	appointed as Minister of the Interior
Croatian Democratic Union	Vili Beroš	District VI	dormant	16 May 2024	appointed as Minister of Health
Croatian Democratic Union	Tomo Medved	District VII	dormant	16 May 2024	appointed as Minister of Croatian Veterans
Croatian Democratic Union	Ivan Celjak	District VII	dormant	16 May 2024	incompatible duty, prefect of Sisak-Moslavina County
Croatian Democratic Union	Martina Furdek-Hajdin	District VII	dormant	16 May 2024	incompatible duty, prefect of Karlovac County
Croatian Democratic Union	Ernest Petry	District VII	dormant	16 May 2024	incompatible duty, prefect of Lika-Senj County
Croatian Democratic Union	Oleg Butković	District VIII	dormant	16 May 2024	appointed as Minister of Sea, Transport and Infrastructure
Croatian Democratic Union	Šime Erlić	District IX	dormant	16 May 2024	appointed as Minister of Regional Development and EU Funds
Croatian Democratic Union	Josip Bilaver	District IX	dormant	16 May 2024	appointed to an incompatible duty
Croatian Democratic Union	Branko Bačić	District X	dormant	16 May 2024	appointed as Minister of Construction, Spatial Planning and State Property
Croatian Democratic Union	Blaženko Boban	District X	dormant	16 May 2024	incompatible duty, prefect of Split-Dalmatia County
Croatian Democratic Union	Zvonko Milas	District XI	dormant	16 May 2024	appointed to an incompatible duty
Croatian Democratic Union	Damir Krstičević	District X	dormant	17 May 2024	
Croatian Democratic Union	Nikolina Brnjac	District VII	concluded	12 July 2024	incompatible duty, Member of the European Parliament
Croatian Democratic Union	Davor Ivo Stier	District VI	concluded	12 July 2024	incompatible duty, Member of the European Parliament
Social Democratic Party of Croatia	Željko Kolar	District III	dormant	16 May 2024	incompatible duty, prefect of Krapina-Zagorje County
Social Democratic Party of Croatia	Biljana Borzan	District IV	concluded	16 May 2024	incompatible duty, Member of the European Parliament
Social Democratic Party of Croatia	Predrag Matić	District V	concluded	16 May 2024	incompatible duty, Member of the European Parliament
Social Democratic Party of Croatia	Zlatko Komadina	District VIII	dormant	16 May 2024	incompatible duty, prefect of Primorje-Gorski Kotar County
Homeland Movement	Mario Radić	District IV	dormant	16 May 2024	
Homeland Movement	Josip Dabro	District V	dormant	17 May 2024	appointed as Minister of Agriculture
Homeland Movement	Ivan Šipić	District IX	dormant	17 May 2024	appointed as Ministry of Demographics and Immigration
Homeland Movement	Damir Biloglav	District IX	dormant	24 May 2024	
Homeland Movement	Stephen Nikola Bartulica	District II	concluded	12 July 2024	incompatible duty, Member of the European Parliament
Law and Justice	Mislav Kolakušić	District I	concluded	16 May 2024	incompatible duty, Member of the European Parliament
Law and Justice	Dražen Dizdar	District I	dormant	20 September 2024	deputizing Mislav Kolakušić
We can!	Danijela Dolenec	District II	dormant	16 May 2024	incompatible duty, deputy mayor of Zagreb
We can!	Luka Korlaet	District III	dormant	16 May 2024	incompatible duty, deputy mayor of Zagreb
We can!	Tomislav Tomašević	District VI	dormant	16 May 2024	incompatible duty, mayor of Zagreb
We can!	Gordan Bosanac	District VI	concluded	12 July 2024	incompatible duty, Member of the European Parliament
Independent Platform of the North	Matija Posavec	District III	dormant	16 May 2024	incompatible duty, prefect of Međimurje County
Centre	Ivica Puljak	District X	dormant	16 May 2024	
