= Croatian Parliament electoral districts =

Territorial subdivisions of Croatia for parliamentary elections

The Croatian Parliament electoral districts (Croatian: izborne jedinice) are the special territorial subdivision of Croatia used for the country's parliamentary elections.

Croatia has twelve electoral districts. Ten of these are geographical districts within Croatia, each providing fourteen members of Croatian Parliament. District XI is for Croatian citizens living abroad, with three members of parliament (until 2011, it elected a maximum twelve members of parliament, depending on turnout). District XII is for national minorities, providing eight members of parliament.

The first ten districts are roughly based on geography, but shaped according to the number of voters so that each district holds roughly the same number of registered voters, around 400,000. These districts therefore do not correspond to the borders of top administrative divisions within Croatia and each district contains one or more or parts of several Croatian counties.

== History ==
Geographic electoral districts since 2023

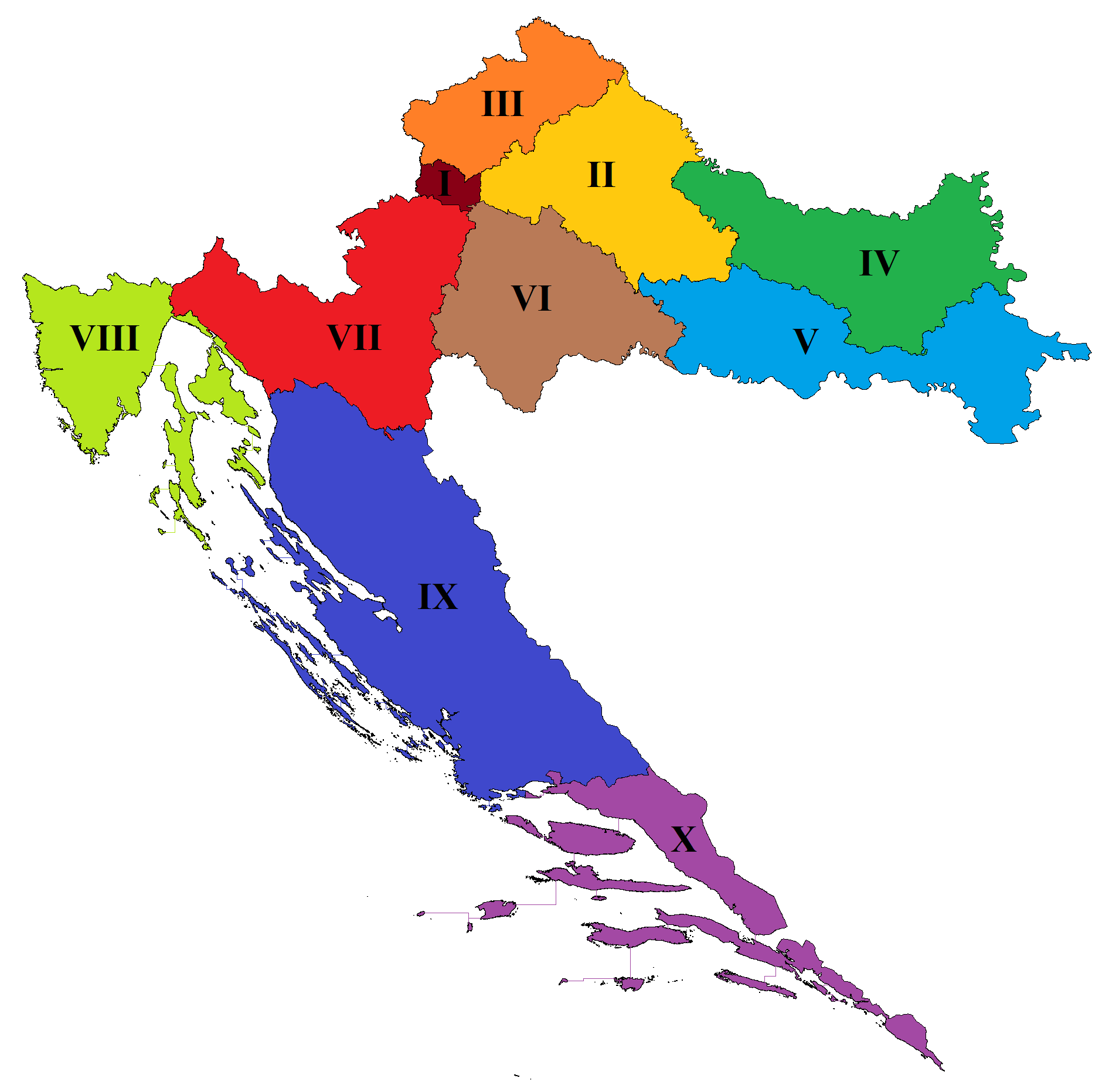
Geographic electoral districts between 2000 and 2023

These districts have been in place since the Law on Electoral Districts of 1999.

They have been used in the following elections as of 2020: 2000, 2003, 2007, 2011, 2015, 2016, 2020.

In December 2010, the Constitutional Court of Croatia ruled that an update to the layout of electoral districts was necessary, as the differences in the number of voters among the districts, limited by law to 5%, had grown to 25%.

The first proposal to amend the election law was proposed by Dragutin Lesar, from the Croatian Labourists – Labour Party, in 2011. The new law proposed a division into six geographical constituencies with fixed borders based on county borders, and the number of seats would depend on the number of voters in each. In the first elections, the units would have between 20 and 25 seats. The law also proposed retaining units for the diaspora and national minorities. The proposal was eventually withdrawn due to lack of support.

The second proposal followed in 2014, when the Croatian Labourists – Labour Party proposed constructively the same law with updated mandate numbers, according to which the units had between 20 and 26 mandates. The proposal passed the first vote but fell in the form of a final bill.

The third proposal was discussed at the same time as the second, and was proposed by the Istrian Democratic Assembly. These changes were accompanied by previous laws according to which the boundaries of constituencies should be adjusted to the number of voters, which would reduce the difference in number of voters below 2%. The proposal passed the first vote, but no final debate was held so it was not adopted.

The fourth proposal for changes to the law came from the referendum initiative "People Decide" ("Narod odlučuje"), which in 2018 collected signatures for calling a referendum. The initiative advocated reducing the number of deputies to 100 to 120, with each constituency electing at least 15 deputies, and reducing the number of constituencies whose borders would coincide with those of counties in the future. The Ministry of Administration found that the initiative did not collect enough signatures, which is why a referendum did not follow.

The fifth proposal came from the Social Democratic Party of Croatia, which, along with the amendment of the Law on Electoral Units, also proposes the amendment of the Law on the Election of Members of the Croatian Parliament. The changes envisage six constituencies with the number of mandates depending on the population in each of them, and the current change would be from 18 to 29 representatives.

On February 7, 2023, the Constitutional Court issued a decision repealing the Law on Electoral Units, which expires on October 1, 2023. This required Parliament to pass a new law that would meet legal standards.

On May 25, the government proposed a new law on constituencies, changing only the boundaries of the existing ones to achieve a deviation of less than 5%.

On September 28, 2023, the Croatian Parliament passed the law, but due to it not being signed by the President before October 1, 2023, the law had to be passed a second time on October 20, 2023, and came into effect on November 3, 2023.

=== Difference between districts ===
Election	I	II	III	IV	V	VI	VII	VIII	IX	X	Difference
2000	363,434	385,179	290,648	333,735	381,150	345,904	372,446	375,114	372,363	391,959	34.85%
2003	358,461	388,713	365,042	328,076	360,242	343,857	382,084	374,678	388,450	401,333	22.33%
2007	361,236	399,648	366,005	335,091	372,163	356,575	403,812	385,594	428,590	416,017	27.90%
2011	358,750	403,716	364,332	333,927	367,654	352,471	413,148	385,376	440,597	422,392	31.94%
2015	336,961	380,485	348,082	303,173	329,855	321,179	392,016	357,567	397,793	396,286	31.21%
2016	334,179	378,186	348,381	299,067	324,523	317,238	389,534	352,754	393,452	393,965	31.73%
2020	341,787	387,890	347,415	312,592	337,321	328,499	408,297	372,573	409,883	397,508	31.12%
proposal	356,866	360,312	360,861	370,565	357,801	365,225	367,100	365,860	369,334	372,712	4.44%
2024	341,023	345,398	349,058	351,860	336,292	352,234	340,923	355,951	350,941	358,110	6.49%

The difference represents the total difference between the largest and smallest district during each election. The legal difference is not above 5%.

== Electoral districts I–X since 2023 ==
=== Electoral district I ===
- Central part of City of Zagreb: city districts: Črnomerec, Donji grad, Gornji grad – Medveščak, Maksimir, Novi Zagreb – east, Peščenica – Žitnjak, Podsljeme and Trnje
- Southern part of Zagreb county: cities and municipalities Velika Gorica, Kravarsko, Orle, Pisarovina, Pokupsko and Rugvica

District I results
Election	Representatives													
2024	Andrej Plenković (HDZ)	Krešimir Ačkar (HDZ)	Željko Reiner (HDZ)	Nina Obuljen Koržinek (HDZ)	Darko Klasić (HSLS)	Mislav Kolakušić (PiP)	Marija Selak Raspudić (Most)	Dalija Orešković (DO i SIP)	Marijana Puljak (Centar)	Arsen Bauk (SDP)	Branko Kolarić (SDP)	Sandra Benčić (Možemo)	Ivana Kekin (Možemo)	Damir Bakić (Možemo)

=== Electoral district II ===
- Whole Bjelovar-Bilogora county
- Eastern part of City of Zagreb: city districts: Donja Dubrava, Gornja Dubrava and Sesvete
- Eastern and South-eastern part of Zagreb county: cities and municipalities Dugo Selo, Ivanić-Grad, Sveti Ivan Zelina, Vrbovec, Bedenica, Brckovljani, Dubrava, Farkaševac, Gradec, Kloštar Ivanić, Križ, Preseka and Rakovec
- Western and Southern part of Koprivnica-Križevci county: cities and municipalities Križevci, Gornja Rijeka, Kalnik, Rasinja, Sokolovac, Sveti Ivan Žabno and Sveti Petar Orehovec

District II results
Election	Representatives													
2024	Gordan Jandroković (HDZ)	Krunoslav Katičić (HDZ)	Ante Deur (HDZ)	Nina Obuljen Koržinek (HDZ)	Gordan Grlić-Radman (HDZ)	Dario Hrebak (HSLS)	Tomislav Josić (DP)	Stephen Nikola Bartulica (DP)	Nino Raspudić (Most)	Anka Mrak-Taritaš (GLAS)	Tanja Sokolić (SDP)	Boris Lalovac (SDP)	Tomislav Golubić (SDP)	Danijela Dolenec (Možemo)

=== Electoral district III ===
- Whole Međimurje county
- Whole Krapina-Zagorje county
- Whole Varaždin county
- North-western part of Zagreb county: municipalities Bistra, Dubravica, Jakovlje, Luka, Marija Gorica and Pušća

District III results
Election	Representatives													
2024	Anđelko Stričak (HDZ)	Zoran Gregurović (HDZ)	Ljubomir Kolarek (HDZ)	Damir Habijan (HDZ)	Predrag Štromar (HNS)	Matija Posavec (NPS)	Dubravko Bilić (NPS)	Miroslav Marković (SDP)	Jasenka Auguštan-Pentek (SDP)	Siniša Hajdaš Dončić (SDP)	Barbara Antolić Vupora (SDP)	Željko Kolar (SDP)	Boška Ban Vlahek (SDP)	Luka Korlaet (Možemo)

=== Electoral district IV ===
- Whole Osijek-Baranja county
- Whole Virovitica-Podravina county
- Northern and Eastern part of Koprivničko-Križevci county: cities and municipalities Đurđevac, Koprivnica, Drnje, Đelekovec, Ferdinandovac, Gola, Hlebine, Kalinovac, Kloštar Podravski, Koprivnički Bregi, Koprivnički Ivanec, Legrad, Molve, Novigrad Podravski, Novo Virje, Peteranec, Podravske Sesvete and Virje

District IV results
Election	Representatives													
2024	Ivan Anušić (HDZ)	Igor Andrović (HDZ)	Darko Sobota (HDZ)	Nataša Tramišak (HDZ)	Ivan Radić (HDZ)	Goran Ivanović (HDZ)	Josip Đakić (HDZ)	Mario Radić (DP)	Željko Lacković (Ind.)	Vesna Vučemilović (HS)	Boris Piližota (SDP)	Sanja Bježančević (SDP)	Sabina Glasovac (SDP)	Mišel Jakšić (SDP)

=== Electoral district V ===
- Whole Vukovar-Syrmia county
- Whole Brod-Posavina county
- Whole Požega-Slavonia county
- Eastern part of Sisak-Moslavina county: cities and municipalities Hrvatska Kostajnica, Novska, Donji Kukuruzari, Hrvatska Dubica, Jasenovac, Lipovljani and Majur

District V results
Election	Representatives													
2024	Marin Piletić (HDZ)	Ivan Bosančić (HDZ)	Pero Ćosić (HDZ)	Antonija Jozić (HDZ)	Danijel Marušić (HDZ)	Nikola Mažar (HDZ)	Željko Glavić (HDZ)	Ivan Penava (DP)	Josip Dabro (DP)	Dubravka Lipovac Pehar (DP)	Marijan Pavliček (HS)	Predrag Fred Matić (SDP)	Martina Vlašić Iljkić (SDP)	Mario Milinković (SDP)

=== Electoral district VI ===
- Western part of City of Zagreb: city districts: Brezovica, Novi Zagreb – west, Podsused – Vrapče, Stenjevec, Trešnjevka – south and Trešnjevka – north
- Western and South-western part of Zagreb county: cities and municipalities Jastrebarsko, Samobor, Sveta Nedelja, Zaprešić, Brdovec, Klinča Sela, Krašić, Stupnik and Žumberak

District VI results
Election	Representatives													
2024	Davor Božinović (HDZ)	Vili Beroš (HDZ)	Mislav Herman (HDZ)	Davor Ivo Stier (HDZ)	Mihael Zmajlović (SDP)	Marija Lugarić (SDP)	Ivan Račan (SDP)	Tomislav Tomašević (Možemo!)	Urša Raukar-Gamulin (Možemo!)	Gordan Bosanac (Možemo!)	Nikola Grmoja (Most)	Igor Peternel (DP)	Krešo Beljak (HSS)	Dario Zurovec (Ind.)

=== Electoral district VII ===
- Whole Lika-Senj county
- Whole Karlovac county
- Central, Southern and Western part of Sisak-Moslavina county: cities and municipalities Glina, Kutina, Petrinja, Popovača, Sisak, Dvor, Gvozd, Lekenik, Martinska Ves, Sunja, Topusko and Velika Ludina
- Northern part of Zadar county: cities and municipalities Obrovac, Pag, Gračac, Jasenice, Kolan, Novigrad, Posedarje, Povljana, Ražanac, Starigrad and Vir
- Northern and Eastern part of Primorje-Gorski Kotar county: cities and municipalities Čabar, Delnice, Kastav, Vrbovsko, Brod Moravice, Čavle, Fužine, Jelenje, Klana, Lokve, Matulji, Mrkopalj, Ravna Gora, Skrad, Vinodolska općina and Viškovo

District VII results
Election	Representatives													
2024	Majda Burić (HDZ)	Ivan Dabo (HDZ)	Magdalena Komes (HDZ)	Damir Mandić (HDZ)	Anđelka Salopek (HDZ)	Veselko Gabričević (HSU)	Marijana Petir (Ind.)	Dalibor Domitrović (SDP)	Kristina Ikić Baniček (SDP)	Sandra Krpan (SDP)	Matej Mostarac (SDP)	Draženka Polović (Možemo!)	Zvonimir Troskot (Most)	Josip Jurčević (Ind.)

=== Electoral district VIII ===
- Whole Istria county.
- Western part of Primorje-Gorski Kotar county: cities and municipalities Bakar, Cres, Crikvenica, Kraljevica, Krk, Mali Lošinj, Novi Vinodolski, Opatija, Rab, Rijeka, Baška, Dobrinj, Kostrena, Lopar, Lovran, Malinska-Dubašnica, Mošćenička Draga, Omišalj, Punat and Vrbnik

District VIII results
Election	Representatives													
2024	Peđa Grbin (SDP)	Mirela Ahmetović (SDP)	Zlatko Komadina (SDP)	Sanja Radolović (SDP)	Saša Đujić (SDP)	Ana Puž Kukuljan (SDP)	Oleg Butković (HDZ)	Anton Kliman (HDZ)	Tomislav Klarić (HDZ)	Josip Ostrogović (HDZ)	Dalibor Paus (IDS)	Loris Peršurić (IDS)	Dušica Radojčić (Možemo!)	Marin Miletić (Most)

=== Electoral district IX ===
- Whole Šibenik-Knin county
- Northern part of Zadar county: cities and municipalities: Benkovac, Biograd na Moru, Nin and Zadar, Bibinje, Galovac, Kali, Kukljica, Lišane Ostrovičke, Pakoštane, Pašman, Polača, Poličnik, Preko, Privlaka, Sali, Stankovci, Sukošan, Sveti Filip i Jakov, Škabrnja, Tkon, Vrsi and Zemunik Donji
- North-western part of Split-Dalmatia county: cities and municipalities Kaštela, Sinj, Solin, Trilj, Trogir, Vrlika, Dicmo, Dugopolje, Hrvace, Klis, Lećevica, Marina, Muć, Okrug, Otok, Prgomet, Primorski Dolac, Seget and Šolta

District IX results
Election	Representatives													
2024	Ivan Malenica (HDZ)	Ante Babić (HDZ)	Nikolina Baradić (HDZ)	Ivan Bugarin (HDZ)	Branka Juričev-Martinčev (HDZ)	Ante Sanader (HDZ)	Hrvoje Zekanović (HDS)	Irena Dragić (SDP)	Sabina Glasovac (SDP)	Tonči Restović (SDP)	Miro Bulj (Most)	Ivica Ledenko (Most)	Damir Biloglav (DOMINO)	Predrag Mišić (Ind.)

=== Electoral district X ===
- Whole Dubrovnik-Neretva county
- Southern part of Split-Dalmatia county: including cities and municipalities Hvar, Imotski, Komiža, Makarska, Omiš, Split, Stari Grad, Supetar, Vis, Vrgorac, Baška Voda, Bol, Brela, Cista Provo, Dugi Rat, Gradac, Jelsa, Lokvičići, Lovreć, Milna, Nerežišća, Podbablje, Podgora, Podstrana, Postira, Proložac, Pučišća, Runovići, Selca, Sućuraj, Sutivan, Šestanovac, Tučepi, Zadvarje, Zagvozd and Zmijavci

District X results
Election	Representatives													
2024	Danica Baričević (HDZ)	Ivan Budalić (HDZ)	Mato Franković (HDZ)	Andro Krstulović Opara (HDZ)	Dalibor Milan (HDZ)	Tomislav Šuta (HDZ)	Mišo Krstičević (SDP)	Ivana Marković (SDP)	Ranko Ostojić (SDP)	Ante Kujundžić (Most)	Božo Petrov (Most)	Ivica Kukavica (DP)	Stipo Mlinarić (DP)	Damir Barbir (Centar)

== Electoral districts I–X between 2000–2023 ==
Area of districts are written in Act on Electoral Districts for the Election of Representatives to the House of Representatives of the Croatian National Parliament published in official gazette on 29 October 1999.

=== Electoral district I ===
Electoral district I consist of:

- northwestern part of Zagreb County including cities and municipalities: Bistra, Brdovec, Dubravica, Jakovlje, Luka, Marija Gorica, Pušča, Zaprešić
- part of central and western City of Zagreb including city districts and streets: Voćarska, Petrova, Ribnjak, Hrvatskih narodnih vladara, Antona Bauera, Matko Laginja, Pavao Šubić, Kralj Zvonimir, Petar Krešimir IV., Knez Mislav, Eugen Kvaternik, Maksimirska naselja, Ružmarinka, Peščenica, Šestine, Mlinovi, Gračani, Markuševec, Vidovec, Remete, Bukovec, Kozjak, Maksimir, Dobri Dol, Dinko Šimunović, Mašićeva, Dotršćina, Ban Keglević, Petar Zrinski, Stjepan Radić, Kraljevac, Ivan Kukuljević Sakcinski, Tuškanac, Gornji Grad, Nova Ves, August Cesarec, Zrinjevac, Cvjetni trg, Andrija Medulić, Ante Topić Mimara, Petar Svačić, August Šenoa, Gupčeva Zvijezda, Medveščak, Šalata, Samoborček, Podsused, Gornji Stenjevec, Perjavica-Borčec, Gornje Vrapče, Vrapče-centar, Vrapče-jug, Gornja Kustošija, Kustošija-centar, Sveti Duh, Medvedgrad, Šestinski Dol, Jelenovac, Matija Gubec, Rudeš, Ante Starčević, Ljubljanica, Ciglenica, Pongračevo, Nikola Tesla, Stara Trešnjevka, S.S. Kranjčević, Antun Mihanović, Bartol Kašić, Horvati-Srednjaci, Knežija, Trnjanska Savica, Martinovka, Poljane, Miramare, Cvjetnica, Marin Držić, Trnje, Cvjetno naselje, Veslačko naselje, Savski kuti, Staro Trnje, Hrvatskog književnika Mile Budaka, Sigečica

District I results
Election	1	2	3	4	5	6	7	8	9	10	11	12	13	14
2000	HDZ			HSS - LS - HNS - ASH		SDP - HSLS								
2003	HSP - ZDS	HDZ					HNS		SDP					
2007	HDZ					HNS	SDP							
2011	HDZ				HL	SDP - HNS - IDS - HSU								
2015	Patriotic coalition(HDZ)				MOST			Croatia is Growing coalition(SDP)						
2016	HDZ - HSLS					MOST	Only option coalition(ŽZ)	People's Coalition(SDP)						
2020	HDZ - HSLS					DP - HS - BLOK - HKS - HRAST - SU - ZL	MOST	SsIP - Pametno - Fokus	Green-Left coalition(Možemo)			Restart Coalition(SDP)		

=== Electoral district II ===
Electoral district II consist of:

- eastern part of Zagreb County including cities and municipalities: Bedenica, Brckovljani, Dubrava, Dugo Selo, Farkaševac, Gradec, Preseka, Rakovec, Sveti Ivan Zelina, Vrbovec
- whole Koprivnica-Križevci County
- whole Bjelovar-Bilogora County
- eastern part of City of Zagreb including city districts and streets: Adamovec, Belovar, Blaguša, Budenec, Cerje-Sesvete, Dobrodol, Drenčec, Dubec, Dumovec, Đurđekovec, Gajec, Gajišće, Glavnica Donja, Glavnica Gornja, Glavničica, Goranec, Jelkovec, Jesenovec, Kašina, Kašinska Sopnica, Kobiljak, Kučilovina, Kućanec, Luka Sesvete, Lužan, Markovo Polje, Moravče, Novo Brestje, Paruževina, Planina Donja, Planina Gornja, Popovec, Prekvršje, Prepuštovec, Sesvete-Centar, Sesvetska Sela, Sesvetska Selnica, Sesvetska Sopnica, Soblinec, Staro Brestje, Šašinovec, Šija Vrh, Šimunčevec, Vuger Selo, Vugrovec Donji, Vugrovec Gornji, Vurnovec, Žerjavinec and settlements in Dubrava: Trnovčica, Studentski Grad and Poljanice; Granešina, Dankovec, Miroševac, Oporovec, Granešinski Novaki, Zeleni Brijeg, Čulinec, Stari Retkovec, Klaka, Dubrava-središte, Gornja Dubrava, Ivan Mažuranić, Novi Retkovec, Donja Dubrava, 30. svibnja 1990., Čučerje, Branovec-Jalšovec, Novoselec

District II results
Election	1	2	3	4	5	6	7	8	9	10	11	12	13	14
2000	HDZ				HSS - LS - HNS			HSLS - SDP						
2003	HSP	HDZ						HSS		HSLS - DC	SDP - LIBRA			
2007	HDZ					HSS - HSLS			SDP					
2011	HDZ				HSS	HL	SDP - HNS - IDS - HSU							
2015	Patriotic coalition(HDZ)						MOST		Labour and Solidarity coalition(BM365)	Croatia is Growing coalition(SDP)				
2016	HDZ - HSLS						MOST	Only Option coalition(ŽZ)	For Prime Minister coalition(BM365)	People's Coalition(SDP)				
2020	HDZ - HSLS						DP - HS - BLOK - HKS - HRAST - SU - ZL		MOST	Green-Left coalition(Možemo)	Restart Coalition(SDP)			

=== Electoral district III ===
Electoral district III consist of:

- whole Krapina-Zagorje County
- whole Varaždin County
- whole Međimurje County

District III results
Election	1	2	3	4	5	6	7	8	9	10	11	12	13	14
2000	HDZ				HSS - LS - HNS		SDP - HSLS							
2003	HDZ				HDSS	HSS	HSLS - DC	HSU	HNS		SDP - LIBRA			
2007	HDZ				HSLS - HSS - ZDS	HNS				SDP - LIBRA				
2011	HDZ			HL	SDP - HNS - IDS - HSU									
2015	Patriotic coalition(HDZ)				MOST	Successful Croatia coalition(NS R)	Croatia is Growing coalition(SDP)							
2016	HDZ				MOST	Only Option coalition(ŽZ)	People's Coalition(SDP)							
2020	HDZ					DP - HS - BLOK - HKS - HRAST - SU - ZL	HNS	NS R - HSS BR - Umirovljenici	Restart Coalition(SDP)					

=== Electoral district IV ===
Electoral district IV consist of:

- whole Virovitica-Podravina County
- whole Osijek-Baranja County

District IV results
Election	1	2	3	4	5	6	7	8	9	10	11	12	13	14
2000	HSP - HKDU	HDZ				HSS - LS - HNS		HSLS - SDP - SBHS						
2003	HSP	HDZ							HSS	HSU	HNS - SBHS	SDP - LS - LIBRA		
2007	HSP	HDZ						HDSSB		SDP				
2011	HDZ				HDSSB				SDP - HNS - IDS - HSU					
2015	Patriotic coalition(HDZ)						HDSSB		MOST	Croatia is Growing(SDP)				
2016	HDZ						HDSSB - HKS	MOST	Only Option coalition(ŽZ)	People's Coalition coalition(SDP)				
2020	HDZ								DP - HS - BLOK - HKS - HRAST - SU - ZL			Restart Coalition(SDP)		

=== Electoral district V ===
Electoral district V consist of:

- whole Požega-Slavonia County
- whole Brod-Posavina County
- whole Vukovar-Syrmia County

District V results
Election	1	2	3	4	5	6	7	8	9	10	11	12	13	14
2000	HSP - HKDU	HDZ					HSS - LS - HNS			SDP - HSLS				
2003	HSP	HDZ								HSS	HSLS - DC	SDP		
2007	HDZ								HDSSB	HSS - HSLS	SDP			
2011	HDZ						HDSSB		SDP - HNS - IDS - HSU					
2015	Patriotic coalition(HDZ)								MOST		Croatia is Growing coalition(SDP)			
2016	HDZ								MOST	Only Option coalition(ŽZ)	People's Coalition(SDP)			
2020	HDZ								DP - HS - BLOK - HKS - HRAST - SU - ZL			Restart Coalition(SDP)		

=== Electoral district VI ===
Electoral district VI consist of:

- southeastern part of Zagreb County including cities and municipalities: Ivanić Grad, Kloštar Ivanić, Kravarsko, Križ, Orle, Pokupsko, Rugvica, Velika Gorica
- whole Sisak-Moslavina County
- southeastern part of City of Zagreb including city districts and streets: Volovčica, Folnegovićevo naselje, Donje Svetice, Bruno Bušić, Borongaj-Lugovi, Vukomerec, Ferenščica, Savica-Šanci, Žitnjak, Kozari Bok, Resnik, Kozari Putovi, Petruševac, Ivanja Reka, Trnava, Resnički Gaj, Kanal, Zapruđe, Utrine, Travno, Sopot, Siget, Sloboština, Dugave, Središće

District VI results
Election	1	2	3	4	5	6	7	8	9	10	11	12	13	14
2000	HSP - HKDU	HDZ				HSS - LS - HNS		SDP - HSLS						
2003	HSP	HDZ						HSS	HNS	SDP - LS				
2007	HDZ						HSS - HSLS	HNS	SDP					
2011	HDZ - DC				HL	SDP - HNS - IDS - HSU								
2015	Patriotic coalition(HDZ)					MOST		Labour and Solidarity coalition(BM365)	Croatia is Growing coalition(SDP)					
2016	HDZ						MOST	Only Option coalition(ŽZ)	For Prime Minister coalition(BM365)	People's Coalition(SDP)				
2020	HDZ						DP - HS - BLOK - HKS - HRAST - SU - ZL		MOST	Green-Left coalition(Možemo)	Restart Coalition(SDP)			

=== Electoral district VII ===
Electoral district VII consist of:

- southwestern part of Zagreb County including cities and municipalities: Jastrebarsko, Klinča Sela, Krašić, Pisarovina, Samobor, Stupnik, Sveta Nedjelja, Žumberak
- whole Karlovac County
- eastern part of Primorje-Gorski Kotar County including cities and municipalities: Bakar, Brod Moravice, Čabar, Čavle, Delnice, Fužine, Jelenje, Kastav, Klana, Lokve, Mrkopalj, Novi Vinodolski, Ravna Gora, Skrad, Vinodolska općina, Viškovo, Vrbovsko
- western, southwestern and southern part of City of Zagreb including city districts and streets: Gajnice, Stenjevec, Malešnica, Špansko, Prečko, Vrbani, Jarun, Gajevo, Trnsko-Krešimir Rakić, Kajzerica, Savski Gaj, Remetinec, Blato, Jakuševac, Hrelić, Sveta Klara, Botinec, Brebernica, Brezovica, Buzin, Demerje, Desprim, Donji Čehi, Donji Dragonožec, Donji Trpuci, Drežnik Brezovički, Goli Breg, Gornji Čehi, Gornji Dragonožec, Gornji Trpuci, Grančari, Havidić Selo, Horvati, Hrašće Turopoljsko, Hrvatski Leskovac, Hudi Bitek, Ježdovec, Kupinečki Kraljevec, Lipnica, Lučko, Mala Mlaka, Odra, Odranski Obrež, Starjak, Strmec, Veliko Polje, Zadvorsko

District VII results
Election	1	2	3	4	5	6	7	8	9	10	11	12	13	14
2000	HSP - HKDU	HDZ				HSS - LS - HNS - IDS		SDP - HSLS						
2003	HSP	HDZ							HSS	HNS - PGS	SDP			
2007	HDZ						HSS - HSLS - PGS	HNS	SDP					
2011	HDZ				HL	SDP - HNS - IDS - HSU								
2015	Patriotic coalition(HDZ)					MOST		ŽZ	Croatia is Growing coalition(SDP)					
2016	HDZ						MOST	Only Option coalition(ŽZ)	People's Coalition(SDP)					
2020	HDZ						DP - HS - BLOK - HKS - HRAST - SU - ZL	MOST	SsIP - Pametno - Fokus	Green-Left coalition(Možemo)	Restart Coalition(SDP)			

=== Electoral district VIII ===
Electoral district VIII consist of:

- whole Istria County
- western part of Primorje-Gorski Kotar County including cities and municipalities: Baška, Cres, Crikvenica, Dobrinj, Kostrena, Kraljevica, Krk, Lovran, Mali Lošinj, Malinska - Dubašnica, Matulji, Mošćenička Draga, Omišalj, Opatija, Punat, Rab, Rijeka, Vrbnik

District VIII results
Election	1	2	3	4	5	6	7	8	9	10	11	12	13	14
2000	HDZ		IDS - HSS - LS - HNS - ASH					SDP - HSLS - PGS						
2003	HDZ			HSU	HNS - PGS		SDP - IDS							
2007	HDZ			HSU	IDS			SDP						
2011	HDZ		HL	SDP - HNS - IDS - HSU										
2015	Patriotic coalition(HDZ)			MOST	Right to Our Own(IDS)			Croatia is Growing coalition(SDP)						
2016	HDZ			MOST	Only Option coalition(ŽZ)	Even Stronger Istria coalition(IDS)			People's Coalition(SDP)					
2020	HDZ				MOST	Green-Left coalition(Možemo)	Restart Coalition(SDP)							

=== Electoral district IX ===
Electoral district IX consist of:

- whole Lika-Senj County
- whole Zadar County
- whole Šibenik-Knin County
- northern part of Split-Dalmatia County including cities and municipalities: Dicmo, Dugopolje, Hrvace, Kaštela, Klis, Lećevica, Marina, Muć, Okrug, Otok, Prgomet, Primorski Dolac, Seget, Sinj, Trilj, Trogir, Vrlika

District IX results
Election	1	2	3	4	5	6	7	8	9	10	11	12	13	14
2000	HSP - HKDU	HDZ					HSS - LS - HNS - ASH		SDP - HSLS					
2003	HSP	HDZ									HSS	HNS	SDP	
2007	HDZ										SDP			
2011	HDZ - HGS						SDP - HNS - IDS - HSU							
2015	Patriotic coalition(HDZ)								MOST		Croatia is Growing coalition(SDP)			
2016	HDZ								MOST		People's Coalition(SDP)			
2020	HDZ								DP - HS - BLOK - HKS - HRAST - SU - ZL		MOST	Restart Coalition(SDP)		

=== Electoral district X ===
Electoral district X consist of:

- southern part of Split-Dalmatia County including cities and municipalities: Baška Voda, Bol, Brela, Cista Provo, Dugi Rat, Gradac, Hvar, Imotski, Jelsa, Komiža, Lokvičići, Lovreč, Makarska, Milna, Nerežišća, Omiš, Podbablje, Podgora, Podstrana, Postira, Proložac, Pučišća, Runovići, Selca, Solin, Split, Stari Grad, Sućuraj, Supetar, Sutivan, Šestanovac, Šolta, Tučepi, Vis, Vrgorac, Zadvarje, Zagvozd, Zmijavci
- whole Dubrovnik-Neretva County

District X results
Election	1	2	3	4	5	6	7	8	9	10	11	12	13	14
2000	HDZ					HSS - LS - HNS - ASH	HSLS - SDP							
2003	HSP	HDZ							HSS	HNS	SDP - LIBRA			
2007	HDZ								HSS - HSLS	SDP				
2011	HSP AS - HČSP	HDZ - HGS					Ind. Ivan Grubišić		SDP - HNS - IDS - HSU					
2015	Patriotic coalition(HDZ)							MOST			Croatia is Growing coalition(SDP)			
2016	HDZ - HDS							MOST			People's Coalition(SDP)			
2020	HDZ - HDS							DP - HS - BLOK - HKS - HRAST - SU - ZL	MOST		SsIP - Pametno - Fokus	Restart Coalition(SDP)		

== Electoral district XI and XII ==
=== Electoral district XI ===
Special electoral district for election representatives by Croatian citizens who do not reside in Croatia.

District XI results
Election	1	2	3	4	5	6
2000	HDZ					
2003	HDZ				low turnout	
2007	HDZ					low turnout
2011	HDZ					
2015	Patriotic coalition(HDZ)					
2016	HDZ		Ind. Željko Glasnović			
2020	HDZ					
2024	HDZ					

=== Electoral district XII ===
Electoral district for national minorities in Croatia elects their representatives with the district covering all of Croatia.

District XII results
Election	Serbs		Hungarians	Italians	Czech-Slovak	EX-yu	Others
2000	SNS	not elected	DZMH	Ind.	HSS	not elected	SRURH
2003	SDSS		DZMH	Ind.	HSS	SDA	ZUPŠH
2007	SDSS		SMU	Ind.	Ind.	SDA	MRUH
2011	SDSS		SMU	Ind.	SDP - HNS - IDS - HSU	BDSH	CPI EU
2015	SDSS		SMU	Ind.	Ind.	FAI - KUANMZ - HASI - KOSOVA RH	Kali Sara
2016	SDSS		DZMH	Ind.	Ind.	UARH	Kali Sara
2020	SDSS		DZMH	Ind.	Ind.	UARH	Kali Sara
2024	SDSS		DZMH	Ind.	Ind.	Bošnjaci zajedno	Kali Sara
