= Electoral district III (Croatian Parliament) =

- Constituency for the Croatian Parliament
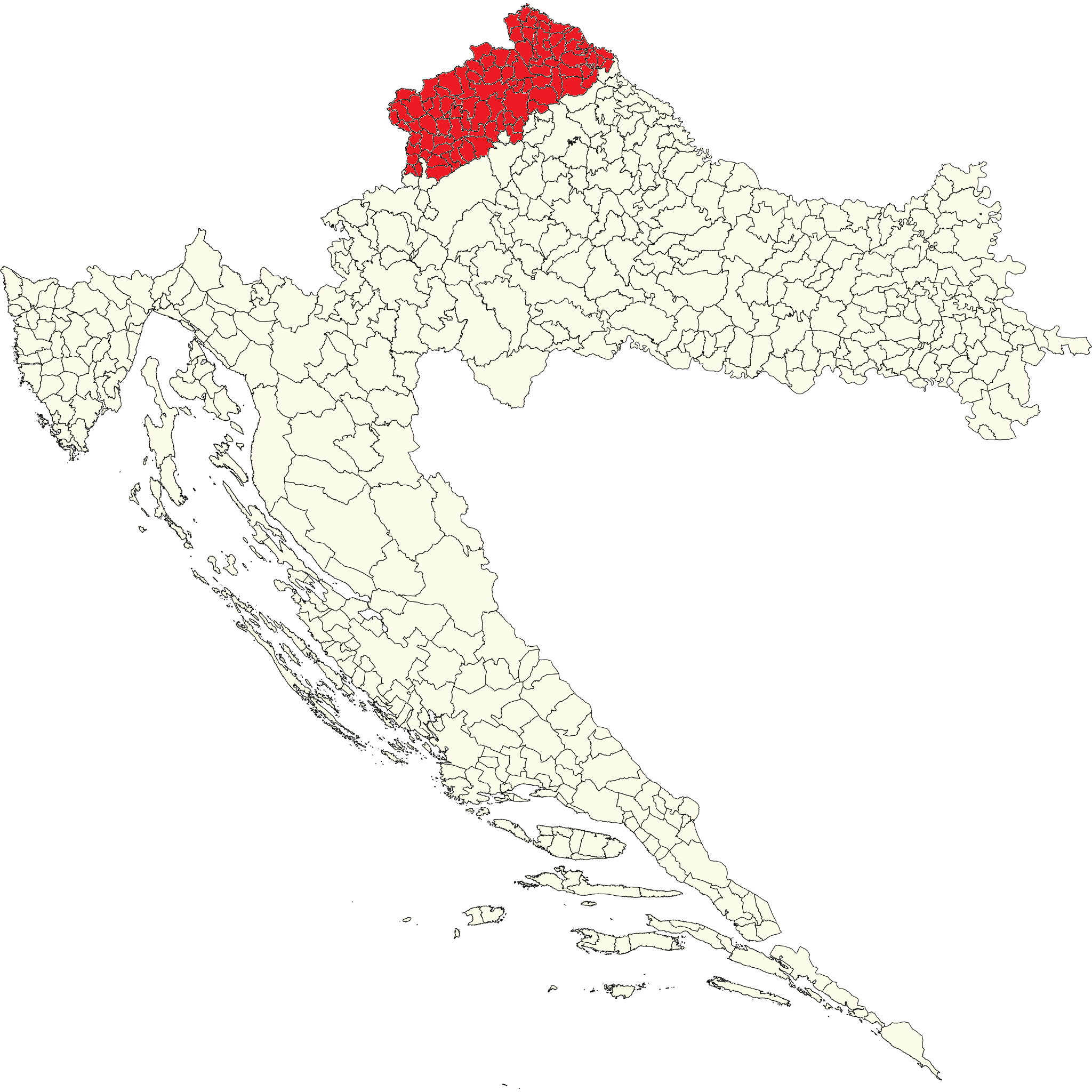
- Map of Electoral district III (2023-present)
- Electorate: 357,656 (2025)
- Major settlements: Varaždin, Ivanec, Novi Marof, Čakovec, Krapina

Current constituency
- Created: 2023
- Number of members: 14

Electoral district III (Croatian: III. izborna jedinica) is one of twelve electoral districts of the Croatian Parliament. In 2025, the district had 357,656 registered voters.

== Boundaries ==
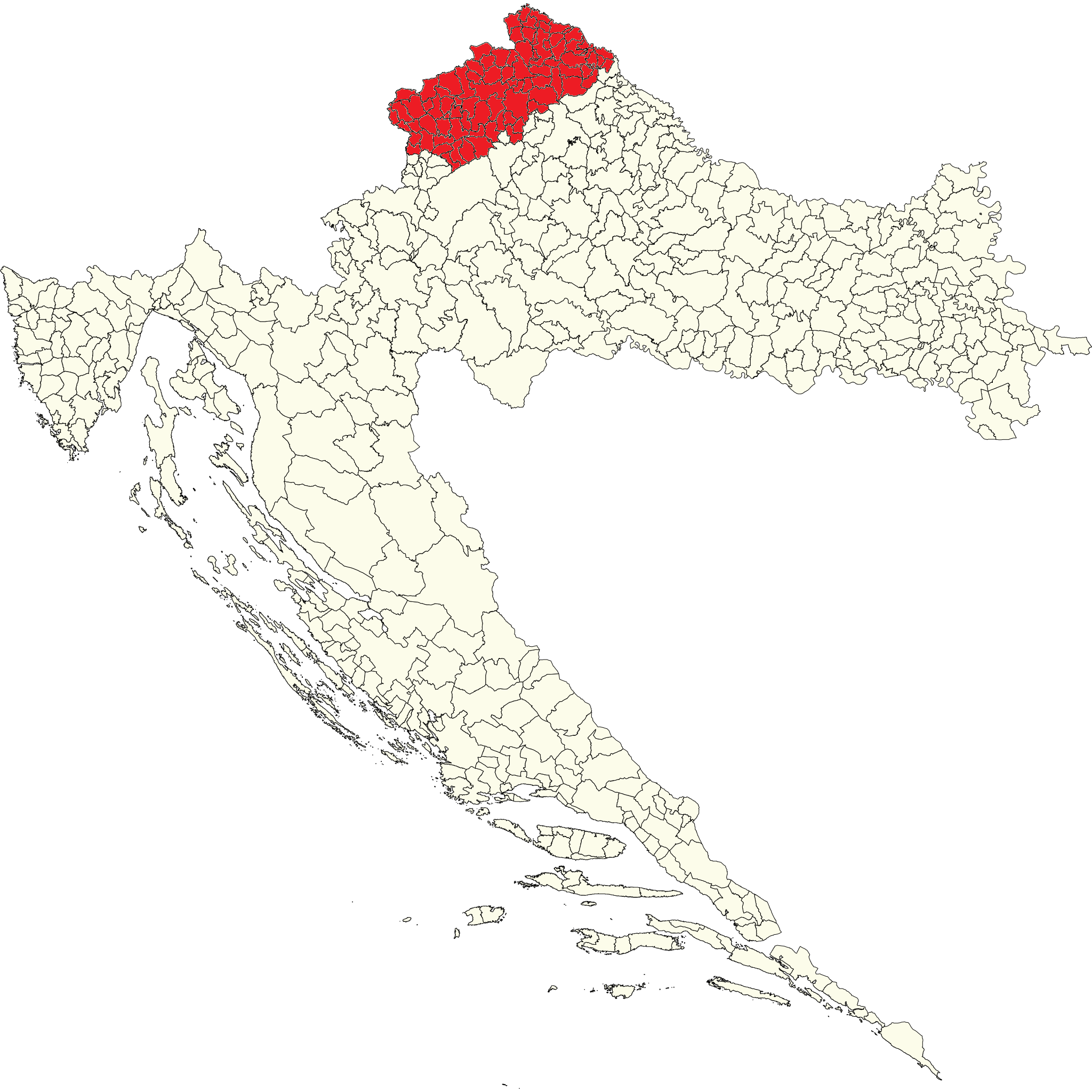
Electoral district III (1999-2023)

=== Creation ===
Electoral district III consisted of:

- The whole Krapina-Zagorje County;
- The whole Varaždin County;
- The whole Međimurje County.

=== 2023 revision ===
Under the 2023 revision, district boundaries were redrawn according to the suggestion of the Constitutional Court to compel a proportional number of voters.

The new district consists of:

- The whole Međimurje County
- The whole Krapina-Zagorje County
- The whole Varaždin County
- The northwestern part of Zagreb County:
  - municipalities Bistra, Dubravica, Jakovlje, Luka, Marija Gorica and Pušća

== Representatives ==
The current representatives of the third electoral district in the Croatian Parliament are:

Name	Party	Deputizing
Barbara Antolić Vupora	SDP	
Jasenka Auguštan-Pentek	SDP	
Anita Curiš Krok	SDP	Željko Kolar
Siniša Hajdaš Dončić	SDP	
Miroslav Marković	SDP	
Zoran Gregurović	HDZ	
Ljubica Jembrih	HDZ	Damir Habijan
Goran Kaniški	HDZ	Anđelko Stričak
Ljubomir Kolarek	HDZ	
Boška Ban	HDZ	
Ivica Baksa	NPS	Matija Posavec
Dubravko Bilić	NPS	
Dubravka Novak	Možemo!	Luka Korlaet
Predrag Štromar	HNS	

== Elections ==
=== 2000 Elections ===
Party	Votes	%	Seats
SDP - HSLS	131.373	46.11	8
HDZ	61.468	21.57	4
HSS - LS - HNS	44.296	15.55	2
others	47.779	16.77	0
Total	284.916	100	14
Valid votes	284.916	98.03	
Invalid/blank votes	5.732	1.97	
Total votes	290.648	79.61	
Registered voters/turnout	365.094		
Source: Results Archived 2022-11-15 at the Wayback Machine

SDP - HSLS

- Zdravko Tomac
- Baltazar Jalšovec
- Dragica Zgrebec
- Miroslav Korenika
- Ivan Čehok
- Sonja Borovčak
- Zorko Vidiček
- Željko Pavlic

HDZ

- Ivan Jarnjak
- Hrvoje Vojvoda
- Velimir Pleša
- Krunoslav Gašparić

HSS - LS - HNS

- Luka Trconić
- Zvonimir Sabati

=== 2003 Elections ===
Party	Votes	%	Seats	+/-
HDZ	61.955	25.77	4	0
SDP - LIBRA	51.512	21.43	4	-3
HNS	36.869	15.34	2	+1
HSS	21.357	8.88	1	0
HSU	14.767	6.14	1	+1
HSLS - DC	14.399	5.99	1	0
HDSS	13.448	5.59	1	+1
others	26.106	10.86	0	0
Total	240.413	100	14	0
Valid votes	240.413	97.04		
Invalid/blank votes	7.336	2.96		
Total votes	247.749	67.87		
Registered voters/turnout	365.042			
Source: Results Archived 2022-11-15 at the Wayback Machine

HDZ

- Ivan Jarnjak
- Vladimir Kurečić
- Velimir Pleša
- Marijan Mlinarić

SDP - LIBRA

- Tonino Picula
- Dragica Zgrebec
- Miroslav Korenika
- Željko Pavlic

HNS

- Radimir Čačić
- Dragutin Lesar

HSS

- Zvonimir Sabati

HSU

- Josip Sudec

HSLS - DC

- Ivan Čehok

HDSS

- Ivo Lončar

=== 2007 Elections ===
Party	Votes	%	Seats	+/-
SDP	75.459	30.79	5	+1
HNS	62.092	25.34	4	+2
HDZ	58.446	23.85	4	0
HSLS - HSS - ZDS	24.394	9.95	1	-1
others	24.673	10.07	0	-2
Total	245.064	100	14	0
Valid votes	245.064	98.40		
Invalid/blank votes	3.977	1.60		
Total votes	249.041	68.04		
Registered voters/turnout	366.005			
Source: Results Archived 2022-11-15 at the Wayback Machine

SDP

- Ljubo Jurčić
- Dragica Zgrebec
- Ivan Hanžek
- Nadica Jelaš
- Mario Habek

HNS

- Radimir Čačić
- Dragutin Lesar
- Danica Hursa
- Zlatko Koračević

HDZ

- Ivan Jarnjak
- Božo Biškupić
- Sunčana Glavak
- Vladimir Ivković

HSLS - HSS - ZDS

- Ivan Čehok

=== 2011 Elections ===
Party	Votes	%	Seats	+/-
SDP - HNS - IDS - HSU	120.906	52.73	10	+1
HDZ	35.615	15.53	3	-1
HL SR	23.200	10.12	1	+1
others	49.589	21.62	0	-1
Total	229.310	100	14	0
Valid votes	229.310	98.16		
Invalid/blank votes	4.296	1.84		
Total votes	233.606	64.12		
Registered voters/turnout	364.332			
Source: Results Archived 2022-11-15 at the Wayback Machine

SDP - HNS - IDS - HSU

- Radimir Čačić
- Siniša Hajdaš Dončić
- Nadica Jelaš
- Sonja Konig
- Mario Habek
- Milorad Batinić
- Željko Kolar
- Mario Moharić
- Natalija Martinčević
- Anđelko Topolovec

HDZ

- Tomislav Karamarko
- Domagoj Ivan Milošević
- Sunčana Glavak

HL SR

- Dragutin Lesar

=== 2015 Elections ===
Party	Votes	%	Seats	+/-
SDP - HNS - HSU - HL SR - A-HSS - ZS	101.594	49.15	8	-3
HDZ - HSS - HSP AS - BUZ - HSLS - HRAST - HDS - ZDS	50.578	24.47	4	+1
Most	16.339	7.90	1	+1
NS R - NH - SHU - ZF - DDS	13.314	6.44	1	+1
ŽZ	10.871	5.26	0	0
others	14.015	6.78	0	0
Total	206.711	100	14	0
Valid votes	206.711	97.84		
Invalid/blank votes	4.572	2.16		
Total votes	211.283	60.70		
Registered voters/turnout	348.082			
Source: Results Archived 2022-11-15 at the Wayback Machine

SDP - HNS - HSU - HL SR - A-HSS - ZS

- Siniša Hajdaš Dončić
- Matija Posavec
- Predrag Štromar
- Milorad Batinić
- Dragica Zgrebec
- Marija Puh
- Tomislav Končevski
- Mario Habek

HDZ - HSS - HSP AS - BUZ - HSLS - HRAST - HDS - ZDS

- Žarko Tušek
- Darko Horvat
- Anđelko Stričak
- Ladislav Ilčić

Most

- Robert Podolnjak

NS R - NH - SHU - ZF - DDS

- Radimir Čačić

=== 2016 Elections ===
Party	Votes	%	Seats	+/-
SDP - HNS - HSS - HSU	93.164	52.56	8	0
HDZ	43.786	24.70	4	0
ŽZ - PH - AM - HDSS - Abeceda - MS	11.767	6.63	1	+1
Most	10.507	5.92	1	0
others	18.021	10.19	0	-1
Total	177.245	100	14	0
Valid votes	177.245	97.81		
Invalid/blank votes	3.969	2.19		
Total votes	181.214	52.02		
Registered voters/turnout	348.381			
Source: Results Archived 2024-07-01 at the Wayback Machine

SDP - HNS - HSS - HSU

- Siniša Hajdaš Dončić
- Matija Posavec
- Milorad Batinić
- Predrag Štromar
- Stjepan Kovač
- Mario Habek
- Marija Puh
- Marko Vešligaj

HDZ

- Žarko Tušek
- Darko Horvat
- Anđelko Stričak
- Josip Križanić

ŽZ - PH - AM - HDSS - Abeceda - MS

- Vladimira Palfi

Most

- Robert Podolnjak

=== 2020 Elections ===
Party	Votes	%	Seats	+/-
SDP - HSS - HSU - SNAGA - GLAS - IDS - PGS	57.557	37.67	6	0
HDZ	45.038	29.48	5	+1
DP - HS - BLOK - HKS - HRAST - SU - ZL	9.528	6.23	1	+1
HNS	8.835	5.78	1	-1
NS R - HSS BR - SHU	8.355	5.46	1	+1
others	23.461	15.38	0	-2
Total	152.774	100	14	0
Valid votes	152.774	97,19		
Invalid/blank votes	4.409	2.81		
Total votes	157.183	45.24		
Registered voters/turnout	347.415			
Source: Results

SDP - HSS - HSU - SNAGA - GLAS - IDS - PGS

- Matija Posavec
- Siniša Hajdaš Dončić
- Željko Kolar
- Barbara Antolić Vupora
- Stjepan Kovač
- Andreja Marić

HDZ

- Žarko Tušek
- Darko Horvat
- Siniša Jenkač
- Anđelko Stričak
- Damir Habijan

DP - HS - BLOK - HKS - HRAST - SU - ZL

- Davor Dretar

HNS

- Predrag Štromar

NS R - HSS BR - SHU

- Radimir Čačić

=== 2024 Elections ===
Party	Votes	%	Seats	+/-
SDP - Centar - HSS - DO i SIP - NS R - GLAS	77.804	36.75	6	-1
HDZ - HSLS - HDS - HNS - HSU	58.356	27.56	5	-1
NPS	25.830	12.10	2	new
Možemo - HP	13.229	6.24	1	+1
DP - PiP - DHSS - ZL	10.714	5.06	0	-1
others	23.461	15.38	0	0
Total	217.710	100	14	0
Valid votes	217.710	96.86		
Invalid/blank votes	6.874	3.14		
Total votes	218.584	62.62		
Registered voters/turnout	349.058			
Source: Results

SDP - Centar - HSS - DO i SIP - NS R - GLAS

- Siniša Hajdaš Dončić
- Barbara Antolić Vupora
- Željko Kolar
- Boška Ban Vlahek
- Miroslav Marković
- Jasenka Auguštan-Pentek

HDZ - HSLS - HDS - HNS - HSU

- Anđelko Stričak
- Zoran Gregurović
- Ljubomir Kolarek
- Predrag Štromar
- Damir Habijan

NPS

- Matija Posavec
- Dubravko Bilić

Možemo - HP

- Luka Korlaet
