= Jelena Miloš =

Croatian politician (born 1986)

Member of Parliament
- Incumbent
- Assumed office 23 September 2022
- Constituency: Electoral district II

Personal details
- Born: 5 August 1986 (age 40) Sinj, SR Croatia, SFR Yugoslavia
- Party: We Can! (2019–present)
- Other political affiliations: Zagreb is OURS! (2017-2025)
- Education: University of Zagreb (BA, MA); Université Libre de Bruxelles (MA)

Jelena Miloš (born 5 August 1986) is a Croatian politician who is serving as a Member of Parliament since 2020. She is a member and co-founder of the green-left political platform We Can!, and the co-founder Zagreb is OURS! party.

== Biography ==
Miloš received a Master of Arts in French and English language and literature from the Faculty of Humanities and Social Sciences, University of Zagreb. She later earned a master’s degree in political science at the Université Libre de Bruxelles.

Throughout her career, she has been involved in trade unions and non-governmental organizations, working with institutions such as the Institute for Political Ecology in Zagreb and the UNI Europa trade union in Brussels.

In the 2021 local election she was elected to the Zagreb Assembly as a member of the Zagreb is OURS! party. In 2022, she entered Parliament as a deputy for Vili Matula and was re-elected in 2024, this time deputizing Danijela Dolenec.
