= Tomislav Tomašević =

Croatian politician (born 1982)

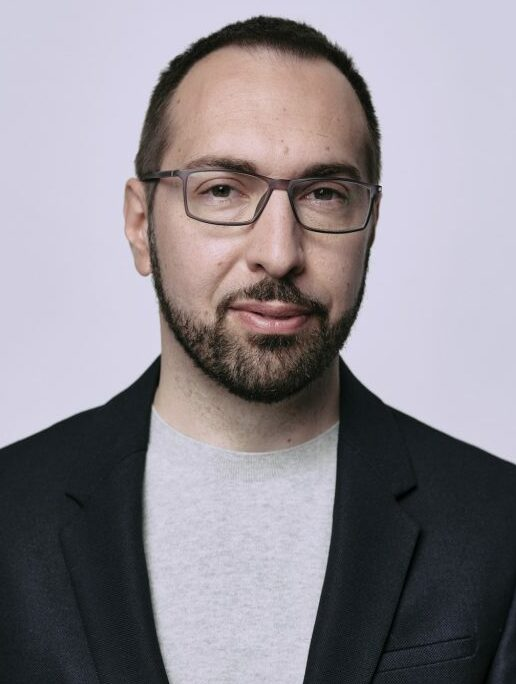
- Tomašević in 2021

Mayor of Zagreb
- Incumbent
- Assumed office 4 June 2021
- Deputy: Danijela Dolenec; Luka Korlaet
- Preceded by: Milan Bandić; Jelena Pavičić Vukičević (acting)

Member of the Croatian Parliament for the 6th electoral district
- Incumbent
- Assumed office 16 May 2024
- Deputy: Rada Borić (substituted from 16 May 2024)

Member of the Croatian Parliament for the 1st electoral district
- In office 22 July 2020 – 16 May 2024
- Deputy: Urša Raukar-Gamulin (substituted from 4 June 2021)

Coordinator of the We Can! – Political Platform
- Incumbent
- Assumed office 18 March 2022 Serving with Sandra Benčić
- Preceded by: Teodor Celakoski

Personal details
- Born: 13 January 1982 (age 44) Zagreb, SR Croatia, SFR Yugoslavia
- Party: We Can! (2019–present)
- Other political affiliations: Zagreb is OURS! (2017–2025); Green–Left Coalition (2017–2024)
- Spouse: Iva Mertić (m. 2016)
- Education: University of Zagreb (BA, MA); University of Cambridge (MPhil)
- Occupation: Politician; activist; environmentalist; political scientist
- Website: tomislavtomasevic.hr

Tomislav Tomašević (pronounced [tǒmislav tomǎːʃevitɕ]; born 13 January 1982) is a Croatian politician, activist, environmentalist and political scientist who has served as the 53rd mayor of Zagreb since 4 June 2021.

He was born in Zagreb, then part of the Socialist Republic of Croatia within Yugoslavia. He graduated from the University of Zagreb and later studied at the University of Cambridge.

Tomašević is one of the coordinators of the green-left political platform We Can! (Croatian: Možemo!), founded in 2019. According to publicly available data, the party reported approximately 300–350 registered members nationwide as of 2023, placing it among the smaller parliamentary political parties in Croatia in terms of formal membership.

Until 2025, he was also a leading figure of the local political party Zagreb is OURS!, which formally merged with We Can! in 2025.

== Life ==
=== Early life and education ===
Tomašević was born in 1982 in Zagreb, SR Croatia, Yugoslavia to mother Ivanka and father Smiljan. He and his brother Tihomir grew up in Zapruđe and later in Zaprešić as the young family moved before his return to Zagreb.

Tomašević's uncle, Ivo Tomašević, is a Catholic priest and a prominent member of the Episcopal Conference of Bosnia and Herzegovina. His paternal grandparents were Bosnian Croats from Vidovice near Orašje.

Tomašević initially enrolled at the University of Zagreb's Faculty of Law before transferring to the Faculty of Political Science, where he graduated with a degree in political science in 2010, after which he completed a postgraduate in environment, society and development from the University of Cambridge in 2013. He received several awards and scholarships, including the Marshal Memorial Fellowship, Chevening Fellowship and Cambridge Overseas Trust Fellowship.

=== Personal life ===
In 2008, he met Iva Mertić through mutual friends, whom he married in 2016 in a Catholic ceremony. They share an interest in adventure, hiking and travelling, among others.

== Political career ==
=== Early activities (1998–2017) ===
In 1998, at the age of 16, as a young environmental protection activist interested in politics, Tomašević joined Green Action, a non-profit environmental advocacy organization. In 2003, he became the first vice-president and later the president of the Croatian Youth Network, a European Youth Forum member organization. Parallel to being vice-president, in 2005, he became a member of the Youth Council of the Government of Croatia. In 2006, he participated in launching the civic initiative Right to a City (Pravo na grad), an organization against privatization. In 2007, at the age of 25, he became president of the Croatian Youth Network, and president of Green Action up until 2012 when a longtime deputy Bernard Ivčić succeeded him. In 2010, he co-founded Group 22, a green-left organization that advocates for degrowth and researches alternatives to capitalism. Tomašević worked with the Government of Croatia from 2012 to 2015 as member of the Council for Sustainable Development and Environmental Protection.

From 2006 to 2011, Tomašević fought against the construction of Centar Cvjetni (a shopping mall) on Petar Preradović Square as president of Green Action which organized the protest together with Right to a City. The reason, in his opinion, was that the shopping mall was out of touch with the surrounding architecture - both in size and design, and the entrance to the underground parking garage would take up a portion of the Varšavska Street pedestrian zone. The climax happened on 17 May 2010 when protestors clashed with a large group of security guards, knocked over the construction site fence and blocked traffic and the construction vehicles. The protestors were met with police; 150 people were arrested, including Tomašević, who led the protest, and his father, despite having different political views. Other activists in the protests included Teodor Celakoski and Urša Raukar-Gamulin. In the end, the shopping mall finished construction in 2011, and is open to this day. In March 2009, together with other colleagues from the Green Action, Tomašević confronted Zagreb Assembly members with water bottles branded "Mutna", meaning murky. It was meant to symbolize the organization's disapproval of the city government for collaborating with businessman Ivica Todorić to build a hotel on protected land, and in their words, for clientelism and corruption. In November 2011, in front of the State Attorney's Office, Tomašević protested alongside Kamensko workers against the closure of the factory, and for the arrest of the management for their "mismanagement".

Upon returning to Croatia in 2015, he shortly worked at the Heinrich Böll Foundation, and in the same year started working at the Institute for Political Ecology which employed several other future Zagreb is OURS! members such as Danijela Dolenec and Jelena Miloš. There, he researched the democratization of rail services, water governance and waste management services, among others. He left in 2020.

=== Member of the Croatian Parliament (2020–present) ===
Tomislav Tomašević was one of the co-founders of the We Can! political party in 2019, right before the European Parliament election. It was meant to compete on a national stage and represent to the left-wing and green voter base, vowing to not form a coalition with "compromised" political parties such as the SDP. In the 2020 parliamentary election, as the head of the Green–Left Coalition, he was elected member of the 10th Croatian Parliament. His mandate began on 22 July 2020. By the end of the month, he joined four parliamentary committees: Physical Planning and Construction Committee, Committee on the Constitution, Standing Orders and Political System, Interparliamentary Co-operation Committee, and executive committee of the National Group to the Inter-Parliamentary Union.

In the 2021 Zagreb local elections Tomašević was elected as mayor of Zagreb. Consequently, on 4 June, before assuming office as mayor, he froze his mandate in Parliament. For the remainder of the term, his replacement was Urša Raukar-Gamulin.

In 2024, despite being mayor, he ran in the 6th constituency and got 17,674 preferential votes. We Can! got 18.14% of the vote, enough to get him elected together with two of his colleagues. Immediately after the mandate started, he froze his seat, with the substitute being Rada Borić ever since.

== Zagreb mayoral bids ==
=== 2017 ===
In February 2017, Tomašević was one of the initiators and the co-founder of the Zagreb is OURS! political party. In April, it was announced he would be running for mayor of Zagreb together with Danijela Dolenec and Urša Raukar-Gamulin. In the 2017 local elections, he ran for mayor at the head of the Green-Left Coalition led by Zagreb is OURS!, and won 3.94% of the vote at the election. The coalition won four seats in the Zagreb Assembly. Tomašević was among the elected councilors from the coalition, and was a vocal critic of Mayor Milan Bandić in the Assembly.

=== 2021 ===
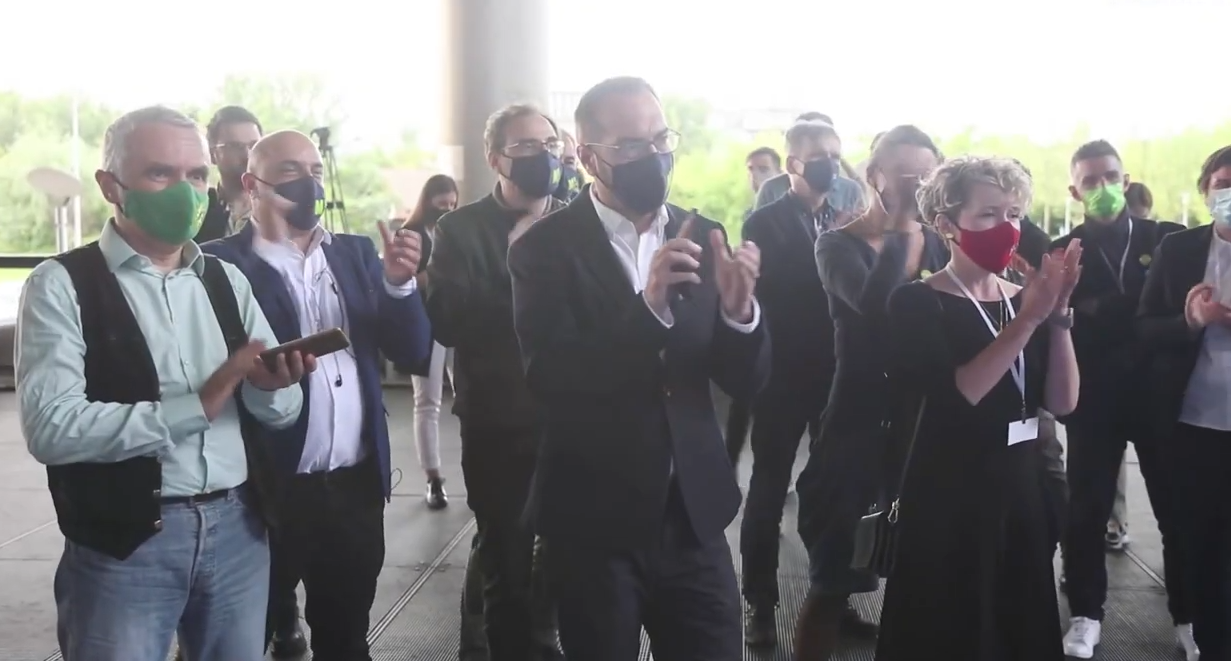
Tomašević (centre) on 16 May 2021

In February 2021, Tomašević announced his candidacy for mayor of Zagreb in the 2021 local elections. Tomašević submitted 20,236 signatures to the State Electoral Commission on 29 April. On the next day, the Commission confirmed that Tomašević and nine more candidates had submitted signatures from registered voters, and that they had thus qualified to be official candidates for mayor. On the 16 May elections, Tomašević won 147,631 votes (45.15%) making him the first candidate in the second round, where he would face Miroslav Škoro of the Homeland Movement. In this election, Tomašević's father Smiljan was a candidate on the Homeland Movement list for the Zagreb Assembly.

On 30 May in the runoff, Tomašević won the mayoral office with 199,630 votes or 63.87% of the vote. He won over Škoro who received 106,300 votes or 34% of the vote. In addition, just as was the case in the first round, Tomašević's second round performance once more set a new record for the number of votes received by a mayor candidate in Zagreb. Namely, his number of almost 200,000 votes was larger by nearly 30,000 than that which Milan Bandić received in the second round of the 2013 election.

=== 2025 ===
Tomašević sought a second term, this time in a coalition with SDP, together with his two deputies. He launched his campaign with a slogan "Unstoppable for Zagreb", and raised €35,980 from more than a 1000 individual donations. Before the election on 18 May, Tomašević refused to attend any debates with other candidates because of their, in his words, "dirty campaign", and instead said he will debate his opponent in the runoff, if it happened. Consequently, all of the other candidates criticized him, but instead fought with each other. Candidate Marija Selak Raspudić commented on it saying: "he is avoiding confrontations because he is afraid to face things he cannot defend". During the campaign, the polls had Tomašević leading by more than 27 percentage points. He got 47,59% of the vote in the first round, almost avoiding the runoff.

In the runoff he faced the independent Marija Selak Raspudić, who became a new face in Zagreb politics after announcing her bid in April that year. After three debates and another week of campaigning, the election was held on 1 June. Tomašević won with 130,996 votes or 57.56% of the vote, about 70,000 less than in 2021, but still securing him a second term. Selak Raspudić congratulated him that night.

== Mayor of Zagreb (2021–present) ==
Tomašević officially assumed office of the mayor on 4 June 2021. The office was handed over to him by Acting Mayor Jelena Pavičić Vukičević, who took the office following the death of Mayor Milan Bandić. Tomašević came to the handover by tram and was late due to an emergency case on a tram station.

=== Media and opposition pressure ===
Within the first two months of appointment, Tomislav Tomašević faced allegations by the media for compromising his pre-election promises, corruption and investigations due to appointment of the medical business owner Tomislav Lauc as the head of the Srebrnjak hospital, a small donor (less than $2000) and a sympathiser of his party, as well as for a partial renewing of a contract with the notorious C.I.O.S Group owned by Petar Pripuz because of a lack of alternatives, despite promising not to.

=== Support of LGBTQ and other minorities ===
On 3 July 2021, Tomašević attended the 20th annual Zagreb Pride. In doing so, Tomašević became the first mayor of Zagreb to attend the parade, by which he was continuing the city's support to the LGBTQ community that was already present during Bandić's mandate. He also led the initiative to join the Rainbow Cities Network and stated that "they, as the new city government, wanted to show that no one can be discriminated on any grounds."

=== Public transportation ===
Under Tomašević, the city bought 40 new Končar trams worth €80 million, which are produced locally, and 65 new busses worth €21 million. The first electric bus was put into service in April 2025. Works started on Sarajevska street, extending the tram network by 2.25 km (1.40 mi) for the first time in 20 years. Under Tomašević, all public transportation became free for Zagreb residents under 18 and over 65 years old in order to combat poverty.

=== Sport ===
Works have started on a €38 million football stadium in Kranjčevićeva street, which is meant to serve as a backup stadium for when the Maksimir Stadium will enter reconstruction, and on the €34 million indoor pool complex in Špansko district. In July 2024 works started to renovate the sports complex Dom sportova.

=== Kindergartens and schools ===
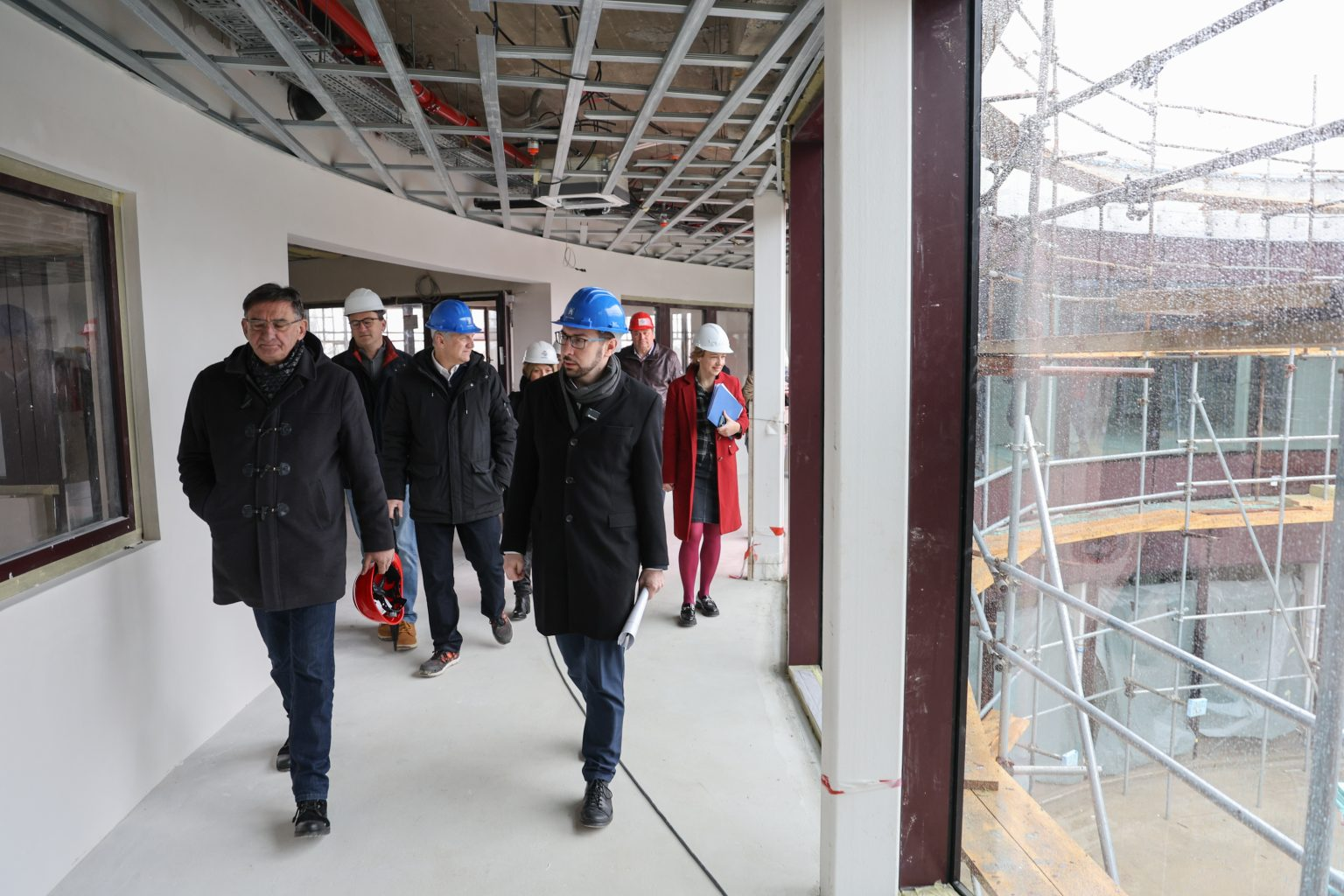
Tomašević touring a kindergarten under construction

To combat Zagreb's chronic lack of capacity in kindergartens, the administration has invested in building and/or upgrading 10 kindergartens, and an additional 8 are currently in construction. The city has done a complete renovation of 8 schools that were damaged by the 2020 earthquake, built and/or upgraded 10, and 8 are currently under construction.

=== Waste management ===
Tomašević campaigned on closing the Jakuševec landfill because of its proximity to urban areas and its effect on the environment and nearby people's health, but the landfill still remains open to this day. In December 2023, as a result of a garbage landslide, three workers were hospitalized with one of them having their arm amputated, resulting in a public outcry. Following the tragedy, Tomašević blamed the city's poor financial situation upon taking office and the change of EU regulation for co-financing composting and sorting plants for not closing the landfill, but partially accepted the blame himself. The project for a new waste management facility has been proposed. However, it includes studies about the viability of a waste incinerator, which sparked an outrage at the Green Action who organized a protest against the city government run by Tomašević, a past member himself.

Before winning the elections, Tomašević promised not to have any business with the company C.I.O.S., but he did make business with C.I.O.S.

== Electoral history ==
Election results
Year	Office	Party	Votes for Tomašević	%	Opponent	Party	Votes	%
2017	Mayor of Zagreb	Zagreb is OURS!	12,996	3.94%	Did not advance to the runoff			
2020	Member of the Croatian Parliament for 1st electoral district	We Can! / Zagreb is OURS!	19,627	11.29%	Elected to the Parliament			
2021	Mayor of Zagreb	We Can! / Zagreb is OURS!	147,631	45.15%	Advanced to the runoff			
2021	Mayor of Zagreb	We Can! / Zagreb is OURS!	199,630	63.87%	Miroslav Škoro	Homeland Movement	106,300	34.01%
2024	Member of the Croatian Parliament for 6th electoral district	We Can!	17,674	7.30%	Elected to the Parliament			
2025	Mayor of Zagreb	We Can!	135,545	47.59%	Advanced to the runoff			
2025	Mayor of Zagreb	We Can!	130,996	56.57%	Marija Selak Raspudić	Independent	96,590	41.71%

== See also ==
- List of mayors of Zagreb
- List of members of the Sabor, 2020–2024
- List of members of the Sabor, 2024–

== Sources ==
- Vladisavljevic, Anja (27 May 2021). "Tomislav Tomasevic: From Grassroots Activist to Zagreb Frontrunner". Balkan Insight.

Political offices
Preceded by Milan Bandić; Jelena Pavičić Vukičević (acting)	53rd Mayor of Zagreb; 2021–present	Incumbent
Preceded by Goran Aleksić; Davor Bernardić; Igor Dragovan; Bruna Esih; Gordan Jandroković; Joško Klisović; Darinko Kosor; Karolina Leaković; Ljubica Lukačić; Vlaho Orepić; Alen Prelec; Vesna Pusić; Željko Reiner; Siniša Varga	Member of the Croatian Parliament; Representative for 1st electoral district 22 July 2020 – 18 June 2021; With: Damir Bakić; Sandra Benčić; Davor Bernardić; Ivan Ćelić; Zlatko Hasanbegović; Mario Kapulica; Darko Klasić; Ljubica Lukačić; Anka Mrak-Taritaš; Dalija Orešković; Željko Reiner; Marija Selak Raspudić; Nikša Vukas	Succeeded by Urša Raukar-Gamulin
Non-profit organization positions
Preceded by Jagoda Munić	President of Green Action; 2007–2012	Succeeded by Bernard Ivčić
