= Luka Korlaet =

Croatian politician (born 1974)

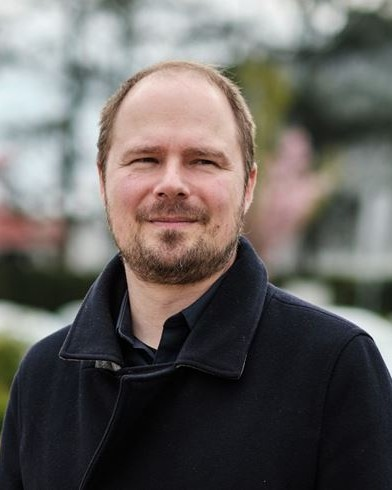
- Korlaet in 2021

Deputy Mayor of Zagreb
- Incumbent
- Assumed office 4 June 2021 Serving with Danijela Dolenec

Member of the Zagreb Assembly
- Incumbent
- Assumed office 17 June 2021

Member of the Croatian Parliament for the 3rd electoral district
- Incumbent
- Assumed office 16 May 2024
- Deputy: Dubravka Novak (acting)

Personal details
- Party: We Can! (2019-present)
- Education: University of Zagreb

Luka Korlaet (born 14 September 1974) is a Croatian architect, urbanist and politician who has served as deputy mayor of Zagreb together with Danijela Dolenec since 2021, under mayor Tomislav Tomašević.

== Life ==
=== Early life and education ===
Korlaet was born in 1974 in Zagreb. He graduated from the Faculty of Architecture at the University of Zagreb in 2001 with a degree in architecture and urbanism.

=== Career ===
Korlaet was a member of the Executive Board of the Zagreb Society of Architects and the Assembly of the Association of Croatian Architects from 2009 to 2011. From 2014 to 2021, he was the member of National Committee of Europan Croatia. He is an associate professor at the Faculty of Architecture.

He worked on multiple architectural designs and on a scientific journal.

== Political career ==
Korlaet is a member of the political party We Can! since 2019, and has been its coordinator for urbanism and housing, contributing to their 2021 Zagreb manifesto. In April 2021, it was announced he would be the candidate for deputy mayor together with Danijela Dolenec. He had been elected to the Zagreb Assembly on 16 May, and after Tomislav Tomašević won in the runoff, Korlaet took the position of deputy mayor, tasked with the role on urban planning, social housing and earthquake recovery following the 2020 Zagreb earthquake. He has been a critic of the recovery under former mayor Milan Bandić, saying that "after 400 days since the earthquake, things have barely moved from the deadlock".

After the 2024 Croatian parliamentary election, Korlaet was elected to the Croatian Parliament. He ran in the 3rd constituency, which includes Međimurje and the city of Varaždin. He campaigned on building more train tracks to better connect Varaždin with Zagreb, and on supporting more local farms. The day the mandate started, 16 May, Korlaet substituted his seat with Dubravka Novak.

Korlaet was reelected to the Zagreb Assembly on 18 May 2025, and as deputy mayor on 1 June, after Tomašević beat Marija Selak Raspudić in the runoffs.
