= Zagreb is OURS =

Croatian political party

Zagreb is OURS! Zagreb je NAŠ!
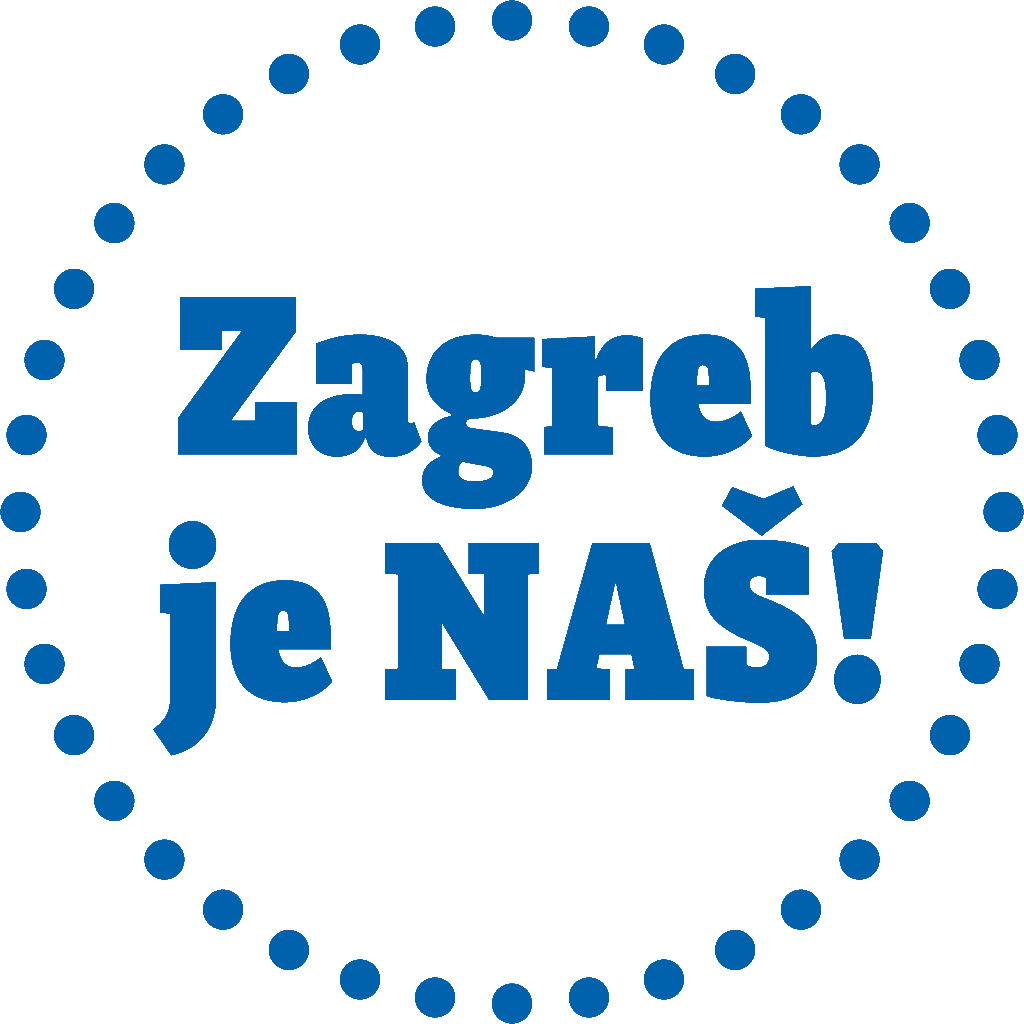
- Leader: Collective leadership
- Founded: 21 February 2017
- Dissolved: 2025
- Merged into: We Can!
- Headquarters: Zagreb, Croatia
- Membership (2022): 101
- Ideology: Green municipalism Anti-fascism; Eco-socialism
- Political position: Centre-left to left-wing
- National affiliation: We Can! Green–Left Coalition (2017–2024)

Website
- zagrebjenas.hr

Zagreb is OURS! (Croatian: Zagreb je NAŠ!) was a municipalist green left political party from Zagreb, Croatia. After winning first seats in the 2017 Zagreb local elections for the Zagreb Assembly and profiling itself as the most vocal opposition to the mayor Milan Bandić and his local majority coalition, the party came into government in Zagreb within the green-left platform We Can! after the 2021 Zagreb local elections. In 2025, its name was changed into We Can! Zagreb, effectively merging it into the We Can! platform.

== History ==
Much of the pre-history of the platform is around local civic activism and movement of Right to the city as "Pravo na grad". The political turn was made significant with escalation of protests and smaller green parties joining forces with activists. The party was founded on 21 February 2017. In April, the party formed a coalition with four left and green parties in Zagreb, for the first time creating an alliance of progressive political organizations in Zagreb. In their very first municipal elections held in May, the coalition won 7,6 % of votes (4 seats) in Zagreb Assembly, 21 seats in city districts and also 41 seats in local councils, with many of the elected representatives being young persons who have previously not been engaged in institutional politics.

The most prominent figures in the platform are current members of the Croatian Parliament: Tomislav Tomašević, Sandra Benčić, Vilim Matula, Mima Simić, the first Croatian LGBTQ political candidate, Urša Raukar-Gamulin (prominent actor), Danijela Dolenec (academic) and Teodor Celakoski (cultural worker).

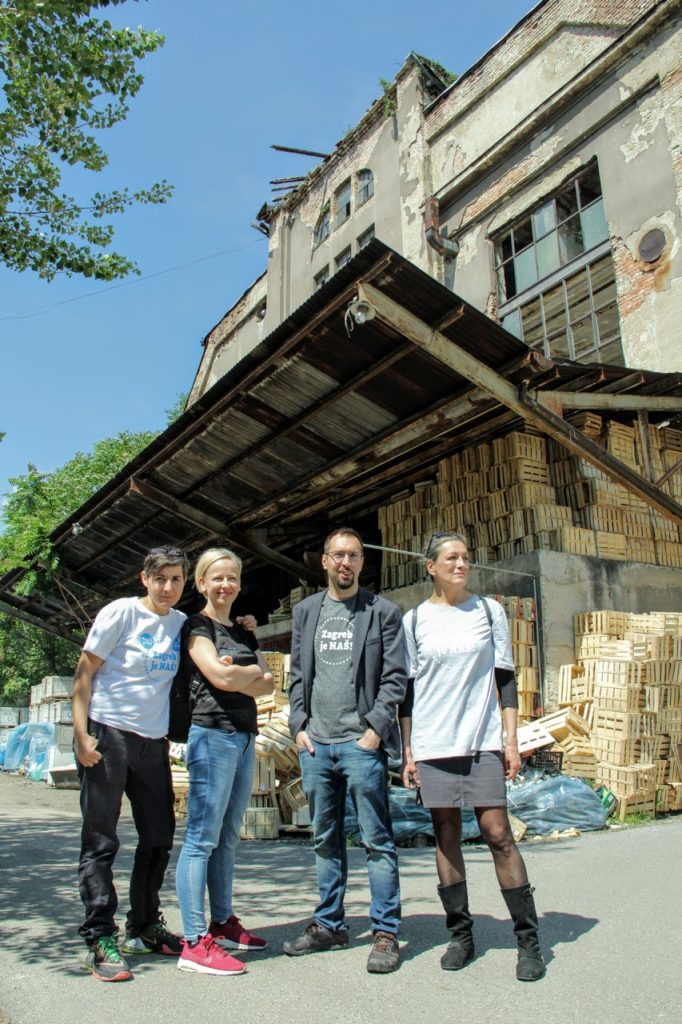
Zagreb is OURS! co-founders in 2017 (Mima, Danijela, Tomislav & Urša) for Culture and Heritage of Industrial Architecture

== Platform ==
The platform describes itself as very diverse, "formed . . . by citizens from all walks of life (activists, cultural workers, trade unionists, social entrepreneurs etc., many of whom have been previously active for years in social movements in Zagreb)", and are different from existing parties in aiming to build a "new politics based on the principles of wide participation, inclusiveness and openness".

The party further expanded its visibility on national level by establishing a national political platform We Can! together with similar grass-root and movement based initiatives for the 2019 European Parliament election. For the 2020 Croatian parliamentary election, Zagreb is OURS! and We Can! presented a joint program and candidates lists, together with coalition partners New Left, Sustainable Development of Croatia, Workers' Front and For the city.

== See also ==
- Green–Left Coalition in Croatia
