= Danijela Dolenec =

Croatian politician (born 1977)

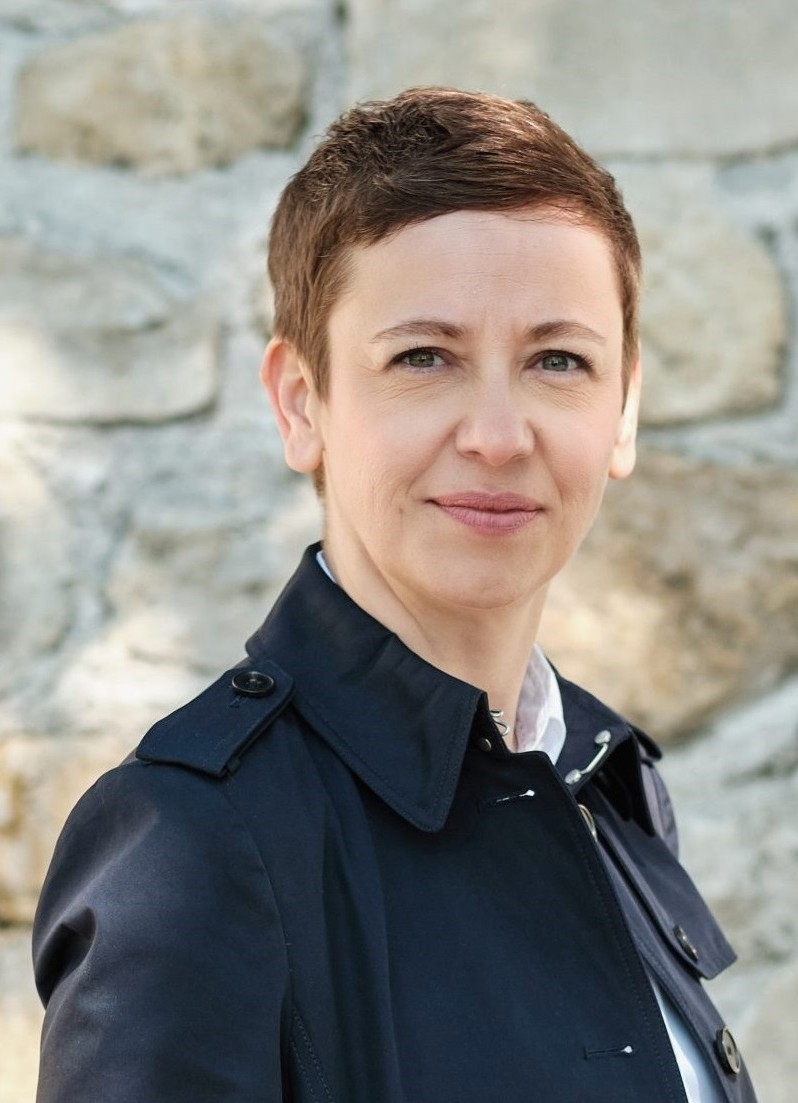
- Dolenec in 2021

Deputy Mayor of Zagreb
- Incumbent
- Assumed office 4 June 2021 Serving with Luka Korlaet

Member of the Zagreb Assembly
- Incumbent
- Assumed office 17 June 2021

Member of the Croatian Parliament for the 2nd electoral district
- Incumbent
- Assumed office 16 May 2024
- Deputy: Jelena Miloš (acting)

Personal details
- Party: We Can! (2019-present)
- Other political affiliations: Zagreb is OURS! (2017-2025)
- Education: University of Zagreb (BA, MA); London School of Economics (MSc); ETH Zurich (DSc)

Danijela Dolenec (born 4 August 1977) is a Croatian political scientist and politician who has served as deputy mayor of Zagreb since 2021, together with Luka Korlaet. A member of the green-left political platform We Can!, she has been a member of the Croatian Parliament since 2024, but is currently being substituted by Jelena Miloš.

== Early life and education ==
Danijela Dolenec was born in 1977 in Zagreb and grew up as a punk fan in Dubrava. She graduated from the Faculty of Humanities and Social Sciences at the University of Zagreb in 2001, with a degree in English Language and Comparative Literature. In 2000, she went to Milwaukee and Washington, D.C. as part of a training program hosted by the U.S. State Department. She received her first master’s degree in public policy and administration from London School of Economics in 2005, and her second master’s degree in European studies from the Faculty of Political Sciences in Zagreb in 2007. Dolenec received her doctorate degree in political science from ETH Zurich in 2012. She went on multiple research trips to Harvard and Oxford Universities, presenting about politics in the Balkans.

== Career ==
From 2005 to 2022, Dolenec has been a member of the Assembly of the Institute for the Development of Education, a nonprofit advocating for universal higher education, and a member of the Supervisory board from 2005 to 2007 and from 2011 to 2018. She was also a member of the Institute for Social Research from 2005 to 2009 as a junior scientist, writing a scientific paper “The dilemma of public financing of a higher education system that strives for constant growth”. She started working at the Faculty of Political Sciences in 2009, and has since held various roles. From 2009 to 2013, she worked as junior research and teaching assistant, during which she worked on the project “European integration in higher education and research in the Western Balkans”. From 2013 to 2019, she worked as assistant professor, and from 2019 onward as associate professor.

She is a member of Group 22, a green-left organization that researches different society models and alternatives to capitalism, and advocates for degrowth.

Dolenec was awarded the State Science Awards in 2013 by the Ministry of Education for her study on the democratization of countries in Central and Southeastern Europe in her paper “Democratic Institutions and Authoritarian Rule in South East Europe”. In 2020, she was awarded the Danubius Mid-Career Award, together with €2,200 for her work in political sciences.

== Political career ==
Dolenec co-founded Zagreb is OURS!, a green-left political platform, in February 2017. In April, she announced her run for deputy mayor of Zagreb, together with Urša Raukar-Gamulin and Tomislav Tomašević. The announcement was held in front of the Social Democratic Party headquarters, intended to send a message of dissatisfaction with the state of the party. Dolenec claimed that “SDP does not have the capacity to deal with the challenges facing the left today.” The Green-Left Coalition, which included Zagreb is OURS!, got 7.64% of the vote, winning 4 seats in the Zagreb Assembly. Dolenec was not among the elected. In 2019, dissatisfied with the political landscape in Croatia, she co-founded the political platform We Can! in order to unite the green-left parties in Croatia. In June 2020, she ran for member of the Croatian Parliament in the VI District, but did not get enough preferential votes to win a mandate.

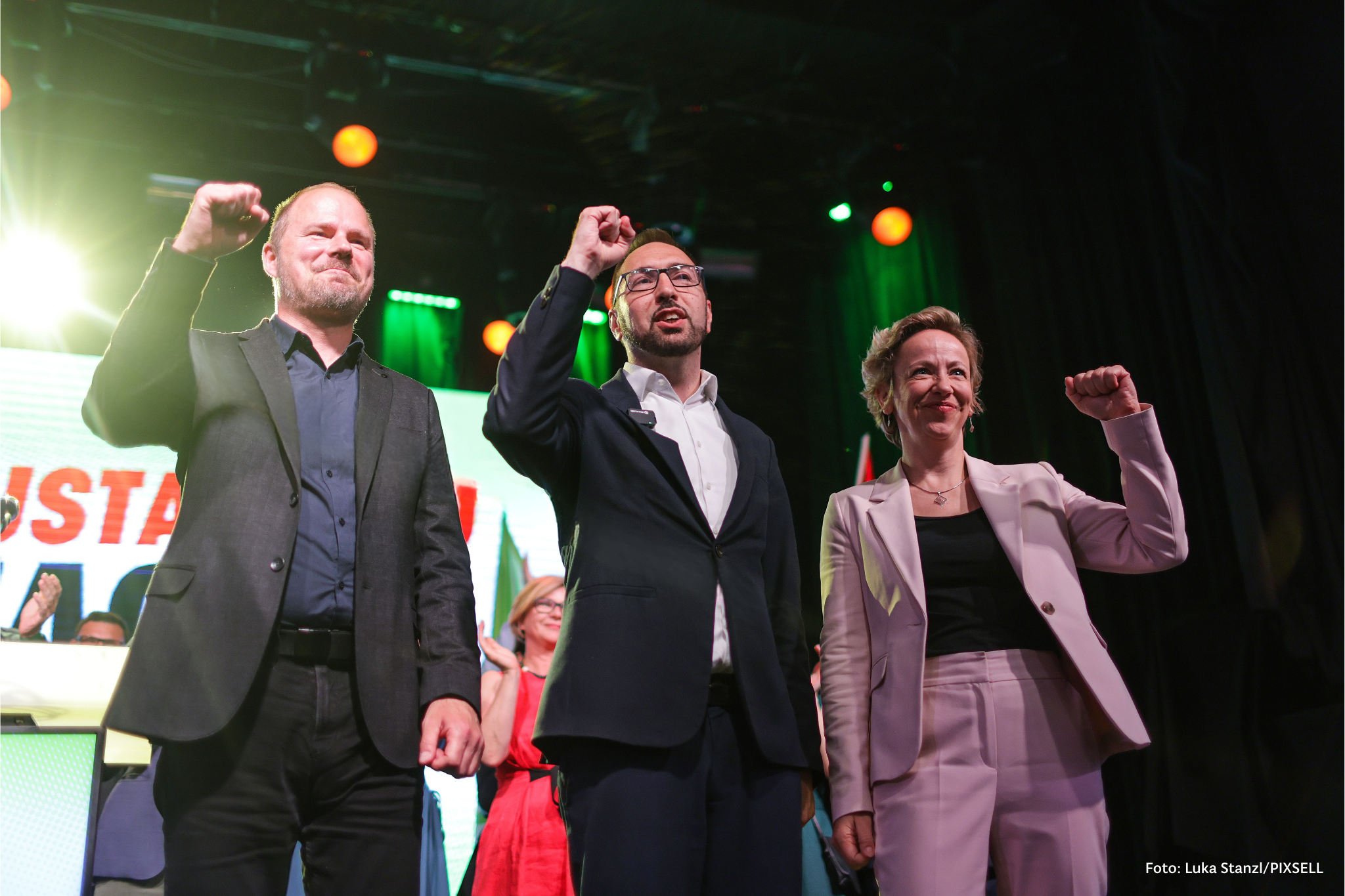
Luka Korlaet, Tomislav Tomašević and Danijela Dolenec after being reelected in 2025

Dolenec ran again for deputy mayor of Zagreb in April 2021, together with Luka Korlaet and Tomašević. We Can! got 40.83% of the vote and won 23 seats in the assembly, including Dolenec and Korlaet. After Tomašević won in the runoffs against Miroslav Škoro, Dolenec assumed office on 4 June. She has a focus on social policy, education, inclusion and worker relations. In 2024, Zagreb won the European Capitals of Inclusion and Diversity Award for its progressive social policies: supporting women, persons with disabilities, LGBTQ people, migrants and Roma. She was reelected as deputy mayor after the 2025 Zagreb elections.

After the 2024 Croatian parliamentary elections, Dolenec was elected to the Croatian Parliament in the II District. The term began on 16 May, and her deputy, Jelena Miloš, took the seat on day one.

== Personal life ==
Dolenec is married to Slaven Vukasović with whom she has a daughter.
