= Ivan Malenica =

Ivan Malenica may refer to:

- Ivan Malenica (water polo)
- Ivan Malenica (politician)
