= Ljubica Jembrih =

Croatian politician (born 1974)

Member of the Croatian Parliament
- In office 15 January 2024 – 16 May 2024

Personal details
- Born: October 31, 1974 (age 50); Zagreb, Croatia (then Yugoslavia)
- Political party: Croatian Democratic Union

Ljubica Jembrih (born 31 October 1974) is a Croatian politician from the Croatian Democratic Union (HDZ) who briefly served as a member of the Croatian Parliament in replacement of Damir Habijan. She previously served as mayor of Lobor and vice-president of the HDZ of Krapina-Zagorje County. She is a textile technician by profession.

== See also ==
- List of members of the Sabor, 2024–
