= Majda Burić =

Croatian politician (born 1979)

Member of the Croatian Parliament
- Incumbent
- Assumed office 14 October 2016

Personal details
- Born: 9 December 1979 (age 46) Rijeka, Yugoslavia
- Education: University of Rijeka

Majda Burić (9 December 1979) is a Croatian politician from the Croatian Democratic Union. She has been a member of the Croatian Parliament since 2016.

== See also ==
- List of members of the Sabor, 2020–2024
- List of members of the Sabor, 2024–
