= Nikolina Baradić =

Croatian politician (born 1990)

Nikolina Baradić (born 22 July 1990 in Šibenik) is a Croatian politician from the Croatian Democratic Union. She represents District IX in the Croatian Parliament deputising for Božidar Kalmeta.

She graduated from the Catholic University of Croatia with a Bachelor of Nursing.
