= Sabina Glasovac =

Croatian politician (born 1978)

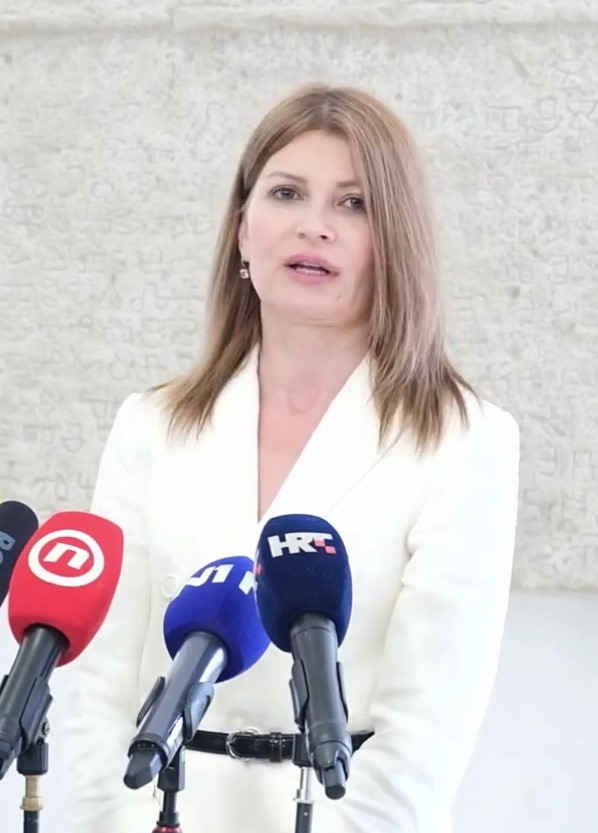

Deputy Speaker of the Croatian Parliament
- Incumbent
- Assumed office 24 May 2024
- Preceded by: Rajko Ostojić

Member of Croatian Parliament
- Incumbent
- Assumed office 14 October 2016
- Constituency: Electoral district IX

Personal details
- Born: 20 May 1978 (age 48) Našice, SR Croatia, SFR Yugoslavia
- Party: Social Democratic Party
- Education: University of Zadar

Sabina Glasovac (born 20 May 1978 in Našice) is a Croatian politician who is currently serving as a Deputy Speaker of the Croatian Parliament and vice president of the Social Democratic Party of Croatia.

== See also ==
- List of members of Croatian Parliament, 2020–
