= Institute for Political Ecology =

Croatian think tank

- Abbreviation: IPE
- Formation: 10 June 2014
- Type: Public policy think tank
- Headquarters: Preobraženska 2, 10000 Zagreb, Croatia
- President: Vedran Horvat
- Website: www.ipe.hr

The Institute for Political Ecology (IPE; Croatian: Institut za političku ekologiju) is an ecology and sustainability think tank based in Zagreb, Croatia. Established on 10 June 2014, the institute conducts interdisciplinary research on environmental policy.

== History ==
The IPE employs 21 team members, including junior researchers and fellows, an academic council, and a managing board directed by Vedran Horvat.

According to the IPE's mission statement, the institute's work on ecological economics has informed policy discussions through publications like Post-Growth Future(s): New Voices, Novel Visions. Key projects include the development of sustainability indicators and the Our Railways study on public transport democratization. The IPE also co-published Post-Growth Future(s) with the Green European Foundation.

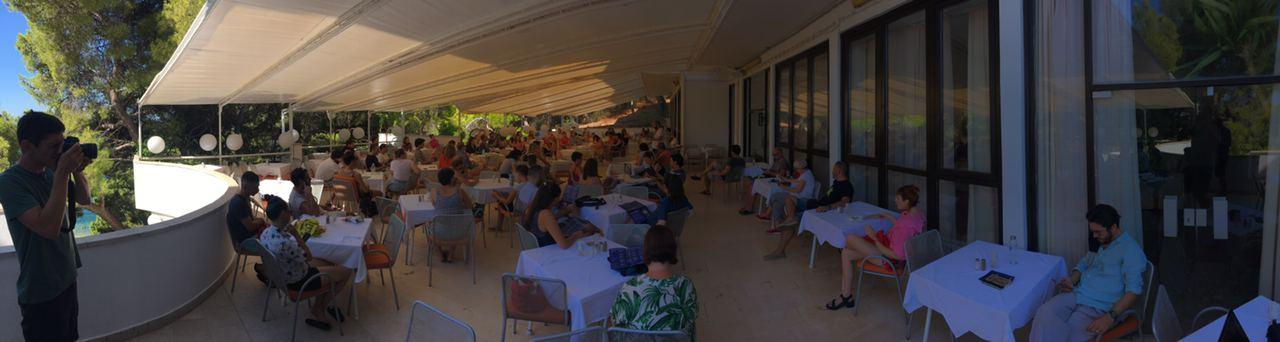
2020 Green Academy event

The IPE's research focuses on ecological changes as drivers of social inequality and thematic work on climate justice per its mission statement. It organizes the Croatian Green Academy, a biannual event that aims to be a regional platform for green political discourse, held since 2010.

The IPE emphasizes degrowth as a core principle. The IPE is a member of the International Degrowth Network, where it engages in transnational advocacy and contributes academic support to the movement, notably through Federico Demaria's co-editorship of Degrowth: A Vocabulary for a New Era, a text on post-growth transitions.

== Affiliations ==
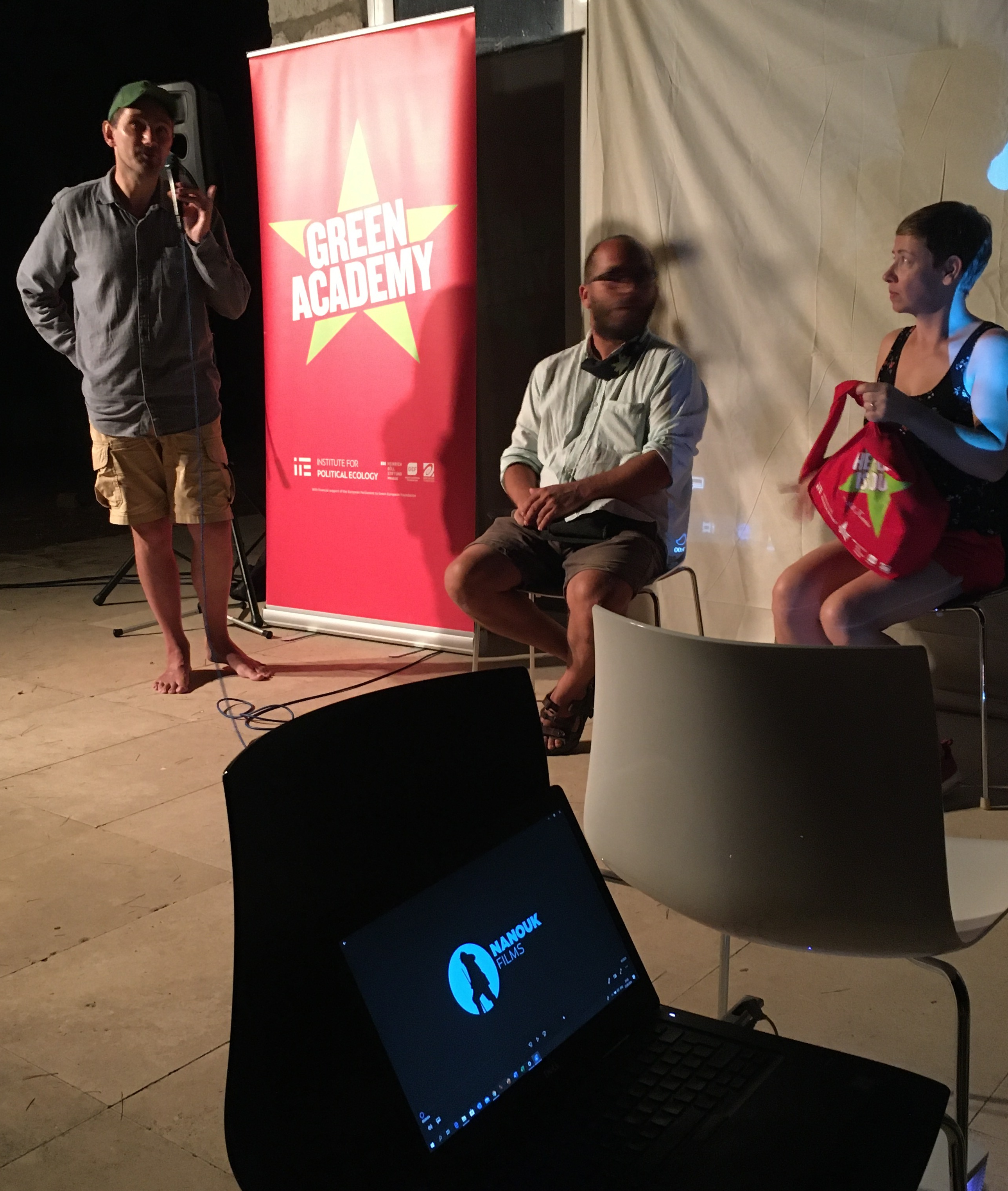
Outdoor screening at the 2020 Green Academy event

The IPE collaborates with the Green European Foundation, Heinrich Böll Foundation, and Rosa Luxemburg Foundation.

== Funding ==
The IPE receives funding from partnerships with international foundations, including the European Parliament-supported Green European Foundation.
