= Ivana Marković =

Croatian politician (born 1979)

Ivana Marković (born 6 March 1979) is a Croatian politician from the Social Democratic Party (SDP). She has been serving as the mayor of Supetar since 2013 and became a member of the Croatian Parliament in 2024.

== Early life and education ==
Marković was born on 6 March 1979 in Supetar. She graduated with a master's in economics from the Faculty of Economics at the University of Split.

== Career ==
After completing her studies, Marković worked at the company Autotrans-Brač as a financial manager until 2006. She then joined the municipal company Komunalno društvo Grad as head of the finance and accounting department, where she worked until June 2013.

In the 2013 local elections, she was elected mayor of Supetar. She has since been re-elected and is currently serving her fourth consecutive term.

In the 2024 parliamentary election, Marković was elected as a member of the Croatian Parliament for the Electoral district X.

== Personal life ==
Marković is married and has one child.
