= Urša Raukar-Gamulin =

Croatian actress, activist and politician

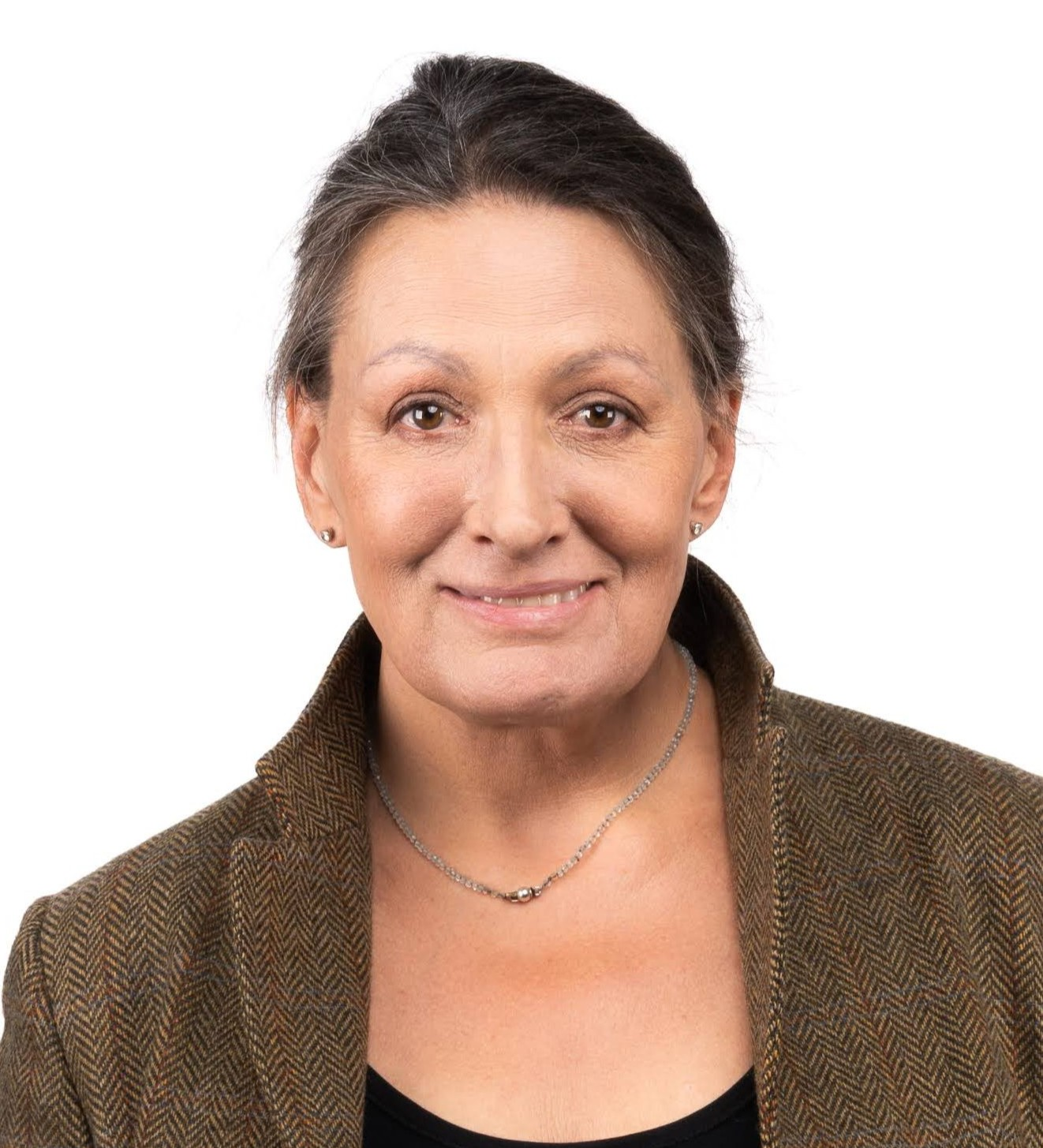
- Raukar-Gamulin in 2024

Member of the Croatian Parliament
- Incumbent
- Assumed office 18 June 2021
- Preceded by: Tomislav Tomašević
- Constituency: District VI

Personal details
- Born: 18 May 1960 (age 66) Zagreb, PR Croatia, FPR Yugoslavia
- Party: We Can! (2019-present)
- Other political affiliations: Zagreb is OURS! (2017-2025)
- Spouse: Niko Gamulin
- Education: University of Zagreb

Urša Raukar-Gamulin (born 18 May 1960) is a Croatian theater, television and film actress and politician who has served as member of the Croatian Parliament since 2021. She is a permanent member of the Zagreb Youth Theater ensemble. She is the great-granddaughter of Ivan Kukuljević Sakcinski, one of the most prominent people in Illyrian movement, and the first croatian politician who gave a speech in Croatian to the Croatian Parliament in 1843. Her name used to be Nada up until before the 2020 Croatian parliamentary election, when she changed it inspired by the witch Uršula Karapača.

Apart from her acting work in Croatia and in international co-productions, she is known to the public as an activist for co-organizing protests and demonstrations against Zagreb Mayor Milan Bandić, cultural policies and other issues. She co-founded green-left Zagreb is OURS! and We Can! political parties, where she has served as coordinator.

== Life ==
Urša Raukar-Gamulin was born in Zagreb in 1960 to Stella and Mladen Raukar, where she finished elementary and high school. After graduating from the Academy of Dramatic Art at the University of Zagreb, in 1983, she became a member of the Zagreb Youth Theater. She worked there until her entry into the Parliament in 2021, and mentioned that “it has been a real privilege to spend my career in an environment as wonderful as this”. In the 90s, she became politically active and started attending protests, including for bringing back the “Square of the Victims of Fascism” square name and “Ne damo Varšavsku”, a protest against a shopping mall in the city centre. There, she met colleagues with whom she went into politics.

When she was 14, her older sister Iva unsuccessfully tried to commit suicide. The sister was diagnosed with bipolar disorder, which was later found to be schizophrenia. As a consequence, her mother developed clinical depression, and, after several attempts, committed suicide when Raukar-Gamulin was in her first year of college. When asked why her mother died, she would always answer: from her heart - because of shame, stigma, fear. For much of her life, she had a fear of being rejected by the society for her family’s problems and had negative experiences with psychiatrists, but later met several psychiatrists who offered her support and comfort. She believes that there needs to be more talk about depression and other mental illnesses in society, and people with problems should seek help and speak with someone before it is too late.

Coming from a wealthy family, in 1996, she started the process of reclaiming properties nationalized after World War II in Yugoslavia. In 2021, as a result of inheritance, Raukar-Gamulin reported owning or co-owning three flats and two houses in Zagreb, three forests and a vacation home, among others. This makes her the wealthiest member of the Croatian Parliament. Urša Raukar-Gamulin is married to Niko Gamulin, an urbanist and open ciritic of mayor Milan Bandić. They have a son Luka.

== Political career ==
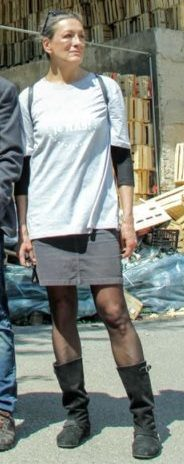
2017 photo from the campaign of Zagreb is OURS!

Raukar-Gamulin parliamentary speech on whistle-blower Ankica Lepej

In February 2017, she co-foundied the green-left Zagreb is OURS! party. In a press conference in front of the SDP headquarters, Raukar-Gamulin said that “we will decentralize culture, which cannot only be present in the city centre” and “equalize the development of independent and institutional culture”. In April, the party announced that Raukar-Gamulin would be running for deputy mayor together with Danijela Dolenec, while Tomislav Tomašević would be running for mayor. The Green-Left Coalition, of which Zagreb is OURS! was part of, got 7.64% of the vote, but Raukar-Gamulin was not among the elected to the City Assembly. In February 2019, she co-founded We Can!, a national political party, together with Sandra Benčić, Tomislav Tomašević and other politicians and political activists, to unite all left-wing and green parties in Croatia. Zagreb is OURS! later merged into We Can!.

=== Croatian Parliament ===
She ran in the 2020 national election for the Croatian Parliament, but was not elected. However, after Tomislav Tomašević won the Zagreb mayoral election on 30 May 2021, he subsequently left parliament, with Raukar-Gamulin taking his place on 18 June as substitute. She joined three committees Tomašević had also been part of: Planning and Construction Committee, Interparliamentary Co-operation Committee and Executive Committee of the National Group to the Inter-Parliamentary Union. In January 2022, she gave a speech about Ankica Lepej, the first prominent whistle-blower of modern Croatia. In the 2024 parliamentary elections Raukar-Gamulin ran for re-election, and won a mandate. For her second term, she stayed in the Interparliamentary Co-operation Committee and the Executive Committee of the National Group to the Inter-Parliamentary Union, and joined the Judiciary Committee and the Committee on Information, Computerisation and the Media, of which she is a deputy chairperson.

She was against nominating judge Ivan Turudić, pushed by Prime Minister Andrej Plenković, for attorney general in 2024 for being “politicized”. A member of the Judiciary Committee, she criticized Turudić’s work because of his “interference in court decisions” and being “politically motivated”.

== Political positions ==
=== Culture ===
Having worked in theatre herself, Urša Raukar-Gamulin advocates for more investment in culture. She and her colleagues proposed a plan to improve the cultural scene in two main ways: the first is to make it easier to create and distribute cultural works in Croatia, through improved paperwork and with increased public investment, including into cultural institutions and independent artists. Second is to invest more equally across the country, bringing cultural activities to rural areas that are currently disconnected with the scene. She also advocates for increased payments to registered independent artists.

=== Abortion ===
Raukar-Gamulin supports safe, legal and free abortion, saying that “the system is obligated to ensure every woman's right to an abortion”. Together with other female members of the Parliament, she criticized the government because of the case of Mirela Čavajda, who was denied abortion despite her baby being diagnosed with brain tumor at 26 weeks of pregnancy. She acknowledges medical staff have a right to conscientious objection, but still believes it is the public institutions who are responsible for safe abortions.

=== Mental health ===
She supports more funding to psychiatric hospitals to better the conditions of patients and expand its capacity, and that it is necessary to create a national strategy to combat suicide and establish a Centre for suicide prevention. She also warns that in rural areas, where social stigma is even higher, mental health services are barely accessible.

== Filmography ==
=== Television roles ===
- Tales of Mystery and Imagination as Rosie (1991)
- Žutokljunac as nanny (2005)
- Bumerang as financial officier (2005)
- Baza Djeda Mraza as nanny Vilhelmina (2009)
- Tajni dnevnik patke Matilde as sheep Lujza (2010–2014)
- Stipe u gostima as Irena/Mirjana (2012–2013)

=== Film roles ===
- A Summer to Remember (1990)
- Zona sudbine (1992)
- The Seventh Cronicle (1996)
- Sleep Sweet, My Darling as Blanka (2005)
- Libertas as Lucia (2006)
- Zagorka as friend (2007)
- I Have to Sleep, My Angel as Ana (2007)
- Pratioci (2008)
- Lea i Darija as lady in audience (2011)
- U jednoj zimskoj noći (2012)
- Srami se (2013)
- The Diary of Diana B. as miss Reich (2019)

=== Voice acting for cartoons ===
- Finding Nemo as Nara (2003)
- Home on the Range as Bara (2004)
- The Incredibles (2004)
- The BFG as Queen Elizabeth II (2016)

== Published works ==
- Raukar, Urša. "Naša Ici." Kazalište XIX, br. 67/68 (2016): 32–33. https://hrcak.srce.hr/184722
