= Kristina Ikić Baniček =

Croatian politician

Mayor of Sisak
- In office 11 June 2013 – 23 May 2025
- Preceded by: Dinko Pintarić
- Succeeded by: Domagoj Orlić

Personal details
- Born: Kristina Ikić; 22 September 1975 (age 50) Sisak, SR Croatia, SFR Yugoslavia
- Party: Social Democratic Party of Croatia (1998-)
- Spouse: Darko Baniček
- Children: 2
- Education: University of Zagreb
- Occupation: Politician
- Profession: Croatologist; Sociologist

Kristina Ikić Baniček (born 22 September 1975) is a Croatian politician who has been mayor of Sisak since 2013 to 2025. She is a member of the center-left Social Democratic Party of Croatia (SDP).

== Early life and education ==
Kristina Ikić Baniček was born in the town of Sisak on 22 September 1975. After finishing elementary and high school in her hometown, she moved to the Croatian capital of Zagreb where she attended University Department for Croatian Studies of the University of Zagreb where she eventually graduated sociology and croatology (cultural study program dedicated to the study of Croatian cultural and national identity).

== Career ==
In 2002, Ikić Baniček started working as a counselor for EU funds in the Croatian mine action center. Between 2001 and 2005, she served as a councilwoman at the Assembly of the Sisak-Moslavina County, and between 2005 and 2013 as a councilwoman in the Council of the City of Sisak. At the 2013 local elections she contested 10-year mayor of Sisak, conservative Dinko Pintarić (HDZ), lost first round, but surprisingly emerged as a winner in the second round. She was reelected at the 2017 local elections.

In 1996, she got involved in the work of SDP Youth Forum, and has been active in the SDP's Sisak branch since 1999.

== Other ==
On 25 June 2017, during the celebration of the Anti-Fascist Struggle Day in the woods of Brezovica near Sisak, Ikić Baniček during her speech publicly criticized Mayor of Zagreb Milan Bandić stating: "The relativisation of Ustasha crimes has gone so far that some self-proclaimed anti-fascists (referring to Bandić) give the city awkward. They hypocritically come here among us and lay wreaths, while rewarding Ustasha counterfeiters such as Jakov Sedlar. (...) You cannot be a salonist anti-fascist and if necessary put an anti-fascist badge on lapel, and then remove it the next day. Anti-fascism is an attitude that is not subject to various interpretations depending on the situation. One must always fight against evil everywhere, and not look away with one eye, if, for example, one misses five hands in the Assembly" (referring to Bandić's coalition with 5 Zagreb Assembly's conservative councilors from the Independents for Croatia party whose member is among others Zlatko Hasanbegović who was accused of relativizing Ustashe crimes committed during WWII).

== Private life ==
Kristina Ikić Baniček lives in Sisak with her husband Darko Baniček and their two children.
