= We Can! (Croatia) =

Croatian political party

We Can! – Political Platform Možemo! – politička platforma
- Abbreviation: M!
- Coordinators: Sandra Benčić; Tomislav Tomašević
- Founded: 10 February 2019; 7 years ago
- Merger of: New Left; Zagreb is OURS!
- Headquarters: Ulica kneza Mislava 8, Zagreb
- Youth wing: Youth Thematic Group – We Can!
- Membership (2024): 495
- Ideology: Green politics; Progressivism; Eco-socialism; Social democracy; Pro-Europeanism
- Political position: Centre-left to left-wing
- National affiliation: Green–Left Coalition (2017–2024)
- European affiliation: European Green Party
- European Parliament group: Greens–European Free Alliance
- Colours: Green; Red
- Sabor: 10 / 151
- European Parliament: 1 / 12
- County Prefects: 1 / 21
- Mayors: 2 / 128
- Zagreb Assembly: 17 / 47

Website
- mozemo.hr

We Can! – Political Platform (Croatian: Možemo! – politička platforma) is a centre-left to left-wing, green political party in Croatia formed by local green and leftist movements and initiatives in order to act on the national level for European Parliament and parliament elections. After the 2021 local elections in Zagreb, they became the largest political party in the Zagreb Assembly, winning 23 seats in total. Their mayoral candidate Tomislav Tomašević won a landslide victory on 31 May 2021.

== History ==
The party originated as the initiative committee consisting of activists and left-wing politicians, 26 of them, mostly coming from the Zagreb is OURS! party, but also including other independent movements across the country within the same political and ideological spectrum.

=== Founding ===
The party was officially founded on 10 February 2019, prior to the elections for the European Parliament held that year, stating their primary areas of interest being better education, better health policies, social and gender equality, support for migrants, renewable sources of energy, and sustainable agriculture.

The founding assembly defined that the party does not have an official president, but instead has two coordinators – for whom Sandra Benčić and Teodor Celakoski were elected among the members – who along with another five members of the party make up its Party Board. Other prominent members of the Initiative committee at the time, most of whom remain active, included Danijela Dolenec, Damir Bakić, Iskra Mandarić, Đuro Capor, Urša Raukar, Vilim Matula, Dario Juričan, Mima Simić, Ivo Špigel, Tomislav Tomašević and others.

=== 2019 EU elections ===
The parties We can!, New Left, and Sustainable Development of Croatia formed a coalition on 28 March 2019 for the 2019 European Parliament election, where they were expected to win one seat. They also stated their support for the Green New Deal that is advocated by the Democracy in Europe Movement 2025 (DiEM25), and were subsequently supported by Yanis Varoufakis. The We can!-led coalition ultimately received 1.79% of the popular vote and 19,313 votes in total.

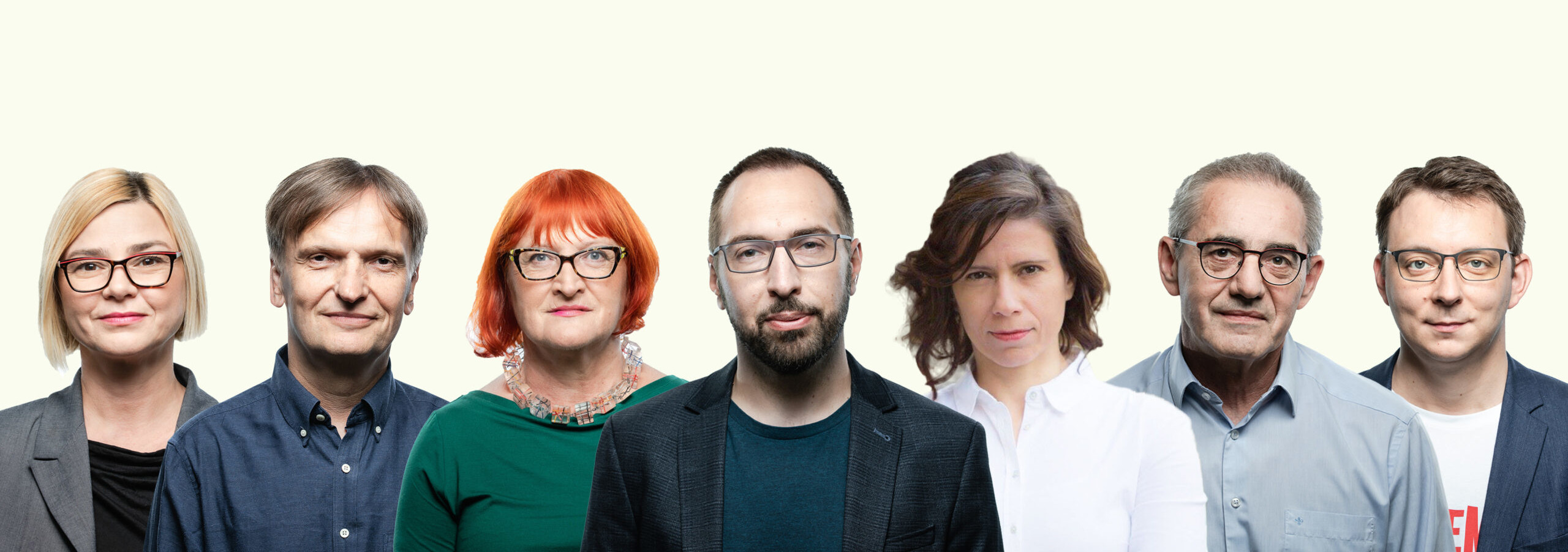
All seven MPs of the Green-Left Coalition, including four members of the We Can! platform.

=== 2020 parliamentary elections ===
Former SDP member and later independent parliamentarian Bojan Glavašević joined the coalition for the 2020 parliamentary elections as the first independent candidate. Mile Kekin, the frontman of the punk-rock band Hladno pivo, joined the party during this period, along with his wife, psychiatrist Ivana Kekin. Mile later authored the song that was used for the party campaigns. Jane Fonda also expressed support for them in the election. During this election, their popularity in Zagreb rose dramatically. According to the results, the coalition won around 7% of votes and 7 seats in the parliament. These seats were taken by Tomislav Tomašević, Sandra Benčić, Damir Bakić, Vilim Matula, Rada Borić (NL), Katarina Peović (RF), and Bojan Glavašević (Ind.). In Dubrovnik, they managed to win 9% of the popular vote thanks to their cooperation with local platform Srđ je grad.

=== 2021 Zagreb local elections ===
In the 2021 Zagreb local elections, they managed to win 40% of the popular vote and 23 seats in the City Assembly. The platform's candidate for mayor of Zagreb, Tomislav Tomašević, defeated right-wing candidate Miroslav Škoro in the second round, by a margin of 64% to 34%.

=== 2025 Zagreb local elections ===
In the 2025 Zagreb local elections, managed to win 43.66% (with SDP) of the popular vote and 25 seats in the City Assembly. The platform's incumbent mayor Tomislav Tomašević defeated opposition candidate Marija Selak Raspudić in the second round, by a margin of 57.56% to 42.44%.

=== 2025 Pazin local elections ===
In the 2025 Croatian local elections, City of Pazin was also won by Možemo! (with SDP) with incumbent mayor Suzana Jašić winning the runoff election (with 67.70%), as well as with 43.93% seats in Pazin City Assembly.

== Co-leaders ==
No.	Name	Portrait	Term of office		No.	Name	Portrait	Term of office	
1	Teodor Celakoski		10 February 2019	18 March 2022	1	Sandra Benčić		10 February 2019	Incumbent
2	Tomislav Tomašević		18 March 2022	Incumbent	1	Sandra Benčić		10 February 2019	Incumbent

== Party program ==
The party designates itself as "a wide and progressive new political platform that aims to gather voters ranging from the radical left, through green, to social democracy". The proposed developmental models seek to reduce precarious forms of work, strengthen economic democracy, and foster trade unions, as well as the legal rights of workers in general.

Možemo! is a member of the European Green Party while its representatives in the Parliamentary Assembly of the Council of Europe sit in the Socialists, Democrats and Greens Group.

== Election results ==
=== Croatian Parliament ===
Election	Leader	Votes	%	Seats	+/–	Coalition	Government
Election	Leader	Coalition		Možemo!		Coalition	Government
2020	Tomislav Tomašević	116,480	6.99%	4 / 151	New	Green–Left	Opposition
2024	Sandra Benčić	193,051	9.10%	10 / 151	▲6	None	Opposition

=== European Parliament ===
Election	List leader	Coalition	Votes	%	Seats	+/–	EP Group
Election	List leader	Coalition	Coalition		Možemo!		EP Group
2019	Tomislav Tomašević	Green–Left	19,313	1.80 (#12)	0 / 12	New	–
2024	Gordan Bosanac	None	44,670	5.92 (#4)	1 / 12	▲1	Greens/EFA

=== Zagreb Assembly ===
Year	Popular vote (coalition)	% of popular vote	Overall seats won	Seat change	Coalition	Government
2021	130,850	40.83	23 / 47	New	Green–Left	Government
2025	121,999	43.66	17 / 47	▼6	with SDP	Government

=== Presidential ===
The following is a list of presidential candidates endorsed by We can! in the elections for President of Croatia.

Election	Candidate	1st round		2nd round		Result
Election	Candidate	Votes	%	Votes	%	Result
2024	Ivana Kekin	144,533	9.00 (#4)			Lost

== See also ==
- Green–Left Coalition
- Zagreb is OURS!
- We Must (Serbia)
- Green Humane City (North Macedonia)
- The Left (Slovenia)
- Left-wing politics in Croatia
