= 2020 Croatian parliamentary election =

- 5 July 2020
- All 151 seats in the Croatian Parliament; 76 seats needed for a majority
- Opinion polls
- Turnout: 46.44% (▼6.15pp)
Party	Leader	Vote %	Seats	+/–
HDZ-led coalition	Andrej Plenković	37.26	66	+5
Restart Coalition	Davor Bernardić	24.87	41	−4
DPMŠ-led coalition	Miroslav Škoro	10.89	16	New
Most	Božo Petrov	7.39	8	−5
Green–Left	Collective leadership	6.99	7	New
IP–P–Focus	Dalija Orešković	3.98	3	+3
HNS-LD	Predrag Štromar	1.30	1	−8
Reformists	Radimir Čačić	1.01	1	0
Minority lists
SDSS	Milorad Pupovac	85.95	3	0
DZMH	Róbert Jankovics	100	1	0
Kali Sara	Veljko Kajtazi	78.48	1	0
UARH	Ermina Lekaj Prljaskaj	31.82	1	0
Independents	—	–	2	0
This lists parties that won seats. See the complete results below.
Result by constituency
Prime Minister before	Prime Minister after
Andrej Plenković; HDZ	Andrej Plenković; HDZ

Parliamentary elections were held in Croatia on 5 July 2020. They were the tenth parliamentary elections since the first multi-party elections in 1990 and elected the 151 members of the Croatian Parliament. 140 Members of Parliament were elected from geographical electoral districts in Croatia, three MPs were chosen by the Croatian diaspora and eight MPs came from the ranks of citizens registered as belonging to any of the 22 constitutionally recognized national minorities. (Note: Albanian, Austrian, Bosnian, Bulgarian, Czech, German, Hungarian, Italian, Jewish, Macedonian, Montenegrin, Polish, Roma, Romanian, Russian, Rusyn, Serbian, Slovak, Slovenian, Turkish, Ukrainian and Vlach)

During April 2020 there was widespread media speculation that the election would be called earlier than originally planned, due to the uncertainty created by the still-ongoing worldwide pandemic of coronavirus disease 2019 (COVID-19). Namely, though the spread of the virus had been brought under control by that time, fears still persisted that the number of infected cases could once again begin to rise in autumn and that this could, therefore, impede or even prevent the holding of the election. Thus, several prominent members of the Croatian Democratic Union (HDZ) – the senior partner in the ruling coalition, (including Speaker of the Parliament Gordan Jandroković) had voiced their support for the proposal that the elections be held some time during the summer. In addition, in early May several sources from within both the ruling HDZ and the opposition Social Democratic Party (SDP) stated that parliament could be dissolved as early as mid-May, with elections then taking place in late June or early July. On 14 May 2020, Prime Minister Andrej Plenković confirmed that the government had indeed reached an agreement with the parliamentary opposition on the holding of an early election and the dissolution of parliament thus took place on 18 May. This entailed that President Zoran Milanović had to formally call the election by 17 July 2020 at the latest.

In the elections the ruling Christian-democratic HDZ faced its main challenge from the centre-left Restart Coalition chaired by SDP leader Davor Bernardić, which consisted of the SDP and several smaller parties (such as the Croatian Peasant Party, Civic-Liberal Alliance, Croatian Party of Pensioners and Istrian Democratic Assembly). Opinion polls suggested that a conservative coalition led by 2019 presidential candidate Miroslav Škoro and of Škoro's Homeland Movement party, some of the parties of the Croatian Sovereignists coalition and several other smaller right-wing parties, would become the third-largest grouping in parliament, while the centre-right Bridge of Independent Lists (Most) – which finished a strong third in both the 2015 and 2016 elections, and which had supported Škoro's presidential campaign, could be reduced to the role of a minor parliamentary party.

The ruling HDZ obtained an upset victory over the Restart Coalition, who had previously been leading in opinion polls for several weeks prior to the elections. The Homeland Movement-led coalition finished third, with Most in fourth place. Two new coalitions, the Green–Left Coalition consisting of We Can!, the New Left, the Worker's Front, ORaH, Zagreb is OURS and For the City, and the centrist Party with a First and Last Name–Pametno–Focus coalition, entered parliament for the first time.

== Background ==
In the previous parliamentary election, held on 11 September 2016, the center-right Croatian Democratic Union (HDZ) won an upset plurality of seats - receiving 61 MPs in the parliament, while the opposition People's Coalition won 54 seats. Therefore, HDZ chairman Andrej Plenković began talks on the formation of a governing majority with the third-placed Bridge of Independent Lists (Most) party, as well as with MPs representing national minorities. Meanwhile, as a result of the defeat of his coalition the SDP chairman (and People's Coalition Prime Ministerial candidate), Zoran Milanović, announced his withdrawal from politics. A few weeks after the election, HDZ and Most successfully concluded their coalition talks and agreed to form a government that would rely on the outside support of the 8 Members of Parliament representing the national minorities. As a result, on 10 October 2016, Plenković presented 91 signatures of support from MPs to President Kolinda Grabar-Kitarović and she, therefore, proceeded to give him a 30-day mandate (expiring on 9 November 2016) to form a government. Thereafter, Parliament formally convened on 14 October 2016 with the election of Most chairman Božo Petrov as a Speaker, while a parliamentary vote held on 19 October 2016 confirmed the proposed Cabinet of Andrej Plenković by a vote of 91 in favor, 45 against and 3 abstentions. Thus, Plenković became the 12th Prime Minister of Croatia, while his cabinet became the fourteenth to hold the office since the first multi-party election took place in 1990 – while Croatia was still a constituent republic of SFR Yugoslavia.

Most left the governing coalition in April 2017 amid a disagreement with the HDZ over Finance Minister Zdravko Marić's alleged withholding of information relating to financial irregularities in Agrokor - one of Croatia's largest firms, which had brought about a crisis due to Agrokor not being able to pay back its loans. Thus, as the HDZ-led government was left without a clear parliamentary majority (and a no-confidence vote in Marić was only narrowly avoided by a 75–75 split vote in Parliament), the possibility of an early election (the third in 18 months) greatly increased during May. However, in June the Plenković government managed to regain a parliamentary majority by forming a new cabinet, which included members of the center-left Croatian People's Party - Liberal Democrats (HNS-LD). Yet, the decision to enter into government with the HDZ - made by the HNS-LD's central body, was quite unexpected and thus immediately created a split within the HNS-LD. Namely, only five of the party's nine MPs decided to support the newly formed coalition, while the remaining four (including former party chair Vesna Pusić) opted instead to form a new political party - named the Civic-Liberal Alliance (Glas), and remain in the opposition.

Prime Minister Andrej Plenković and his HDZ party have faced criticism from numerous activists, public figures and political opponents for allegedly dissolving the Parliament several months in advance in order to avoid holding elections during a major economic crisis (caused by the COVID-19 pandemic), which is expected to have a severe impact on Croatia in autumn, once the financial losses in the tourism sector are included in economic projections.

Many citizens of Zagreb have accused the government and the ruling HDZ party of leaving them unprotected for several months by dissolving the Parliament and by failing to adopt the necessary legal measures to deal with the earthquake damage before doing so. Namely, instead of pursuing the adoption of a set of emergency laws, the government has decided to delay any new legal framework on this issue by at least 3 to 6 months. This caused activists from several public platforms - mainly from Green-Left coalition, to gathered on St. Mark's Square on 17 May 2020, where they remained for 24 hours in order to protest against the resolution on the early dissolution of parliament.

As soon as parliament was dissolved the HDZ's local branch in the city of Vukovar (the site of one of the most major and emotionally symbolic battles in the Croatian War of Independence) decided to cut its ties with the party's central organization, claiming that they felt that their city has been misused for political gain and that the government had also failed to provide it with opportunities for economic development. Thus, this former branch of the HDZ will contest the election as part of some other coalition.

=== Outgoing 9th Assembly of Parliament ===
The following is a partisan makeup of the 9th Assembly of the Croatian Parliament as of 18 May 2020:

Party	Seats	Government	Political position	Leader
Croatian Democratic Union (HDZ)	55	Government	Centre-right to Right-wing	Andrej Plenković (Prime Minister)
Social Democratic Party (SDP)	29	Opposition	Centre-left	Davor Bernardić
Bridge of Independent Lists (Most)	9	Opposition	Centre to Centre-right	Božo Petrov
Bandić Milan 365 - Labour and Solidarity Party (BM 365)	5	Supporting Government	Centre	Milan Bandić
Croatian Peasant Party (HSS)	5	Opposition	Centre-left	Krešo Beljak
Civic Liberal Alliance (Glas)	4	Opposition	Centre-left	Anka Mrak Taritaš
Croatian People's Party-Liberal Democrats (HNS)	5	Government	Centre	Ivan Vrdoljak
Independent Democratic Serb Party (SDSS)	3	Supporting Government	Centre-left	Milorad Pupovac
Independent Youth List (NLM)	3	Opposition	Centre	Ante Pranić
Istrian Democratic Assembly (IDS)	3	Opposition	Centre-left	Boris Miletić
Croatian Christian Democratic Party (HDS)	2	Supporting Government	Right-wing	Goran Dodig
Croatian Party of Pensioners (HSU)	2	Opposition	Centre-left	Silvano Hrelja
Human Shield (ŽZ)	2	Opposition	Syncretic	Ivan Vilibor Sinčić
Party of Ivan Pernar	1	Opposition	Syncretic	Ivan Pernar
Independents for Croatia (NZH)	1	Opposition	Right-wing	Bruna Esih
Let's Change Croatia (PH)	1	Opposition	Centre	Ivan Lovrinović
Croatian Social Liberal Party (HSLS)	1	Supporting Government	Centre to Centre-right	Dario Hrebak
HRAST-Movement for Successful Croatia (Hrast)	1	Opposition	Right-wing	Ladislav Ilčić
Croatian Democratic Alliance of Slavonia and Baranja (HDSSB)	1	Supporting Government	Right-wing	Branimir Glavaš
People's Party - Reformists (NS-R)	1	Opposition	Centre	Radimir Čačić
POWER - People's and Civic Engagement Party (SNAGA)	1	Opposition	Syncretic	Goran Aleksić
Democrats (Demokrati)	1	Opposition	Centre-left	Mirando Mrsić
Bloc for Croatia (BZH)	1	Opposition	Right-wing	Zlatko Hasanbegović
Independent MPs representing national minorities supporting Government (Note: Vladimir Bilek (Czech and Slovak), Robert Jankovics (Hungarian), Veljko Kajtazi (Austrian, Bulgarian, German, Jewish, Polish, Romani, Romanian, Rusyn, Russian, Turkish, Ukrainian and Vlach), Ermina Lekaj Prljaskaj (Albanian, Bosniak, Macedonian, Montenegrin and Slovenian) and Furio Radin (Italian))	5	Supporting Government	—	
Other independent MPs Supporting Government (Note: Mario Habek, Ana Komparić Devčić, Željko Lacković, Ivica Mišić, Zdravko Ronko, Tomislav Saucha)	6	Supporting Government	—	
Other independent MPs in Opposition (Note: Slaven Dobrović, Željko Glasnović, Bojan Glavašević, Marko Vučetić)	4	Opposition	—	
Government total (with support)			82 of 151 (54.30%)	
Opposition total			69 of 151 (45.70%)	

On 18 May 2020, the 9th Assembly dissolved itself by a vote of 105 in favor.

== Electoral system ==
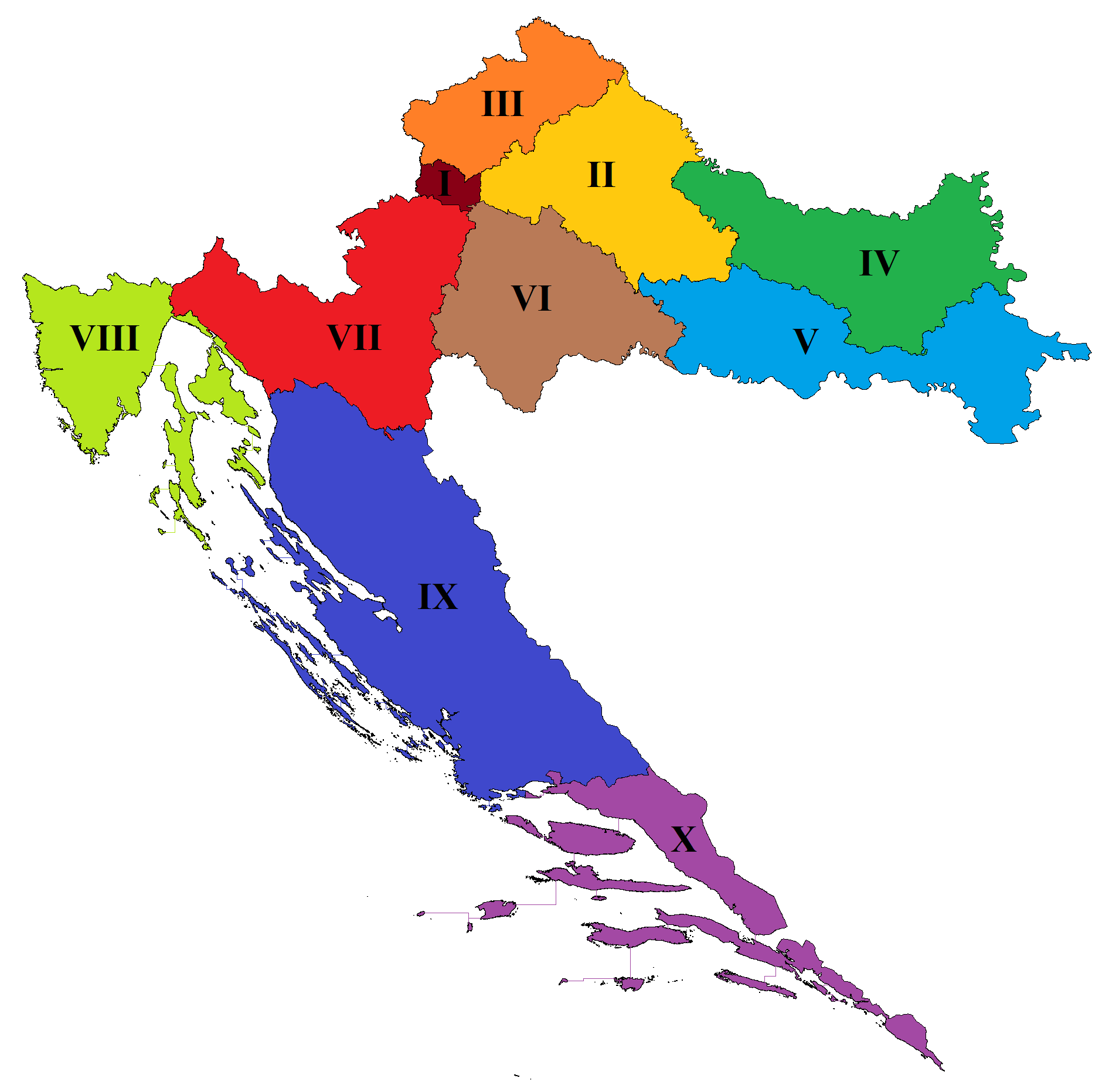
Geographic electoral districts (I-X)

The 151 members of the Croatian Parliament are elected from 10 geographical and two special electoral districts:

- 140 seats are elected in ten geographical 14-seat electoral districts (1st–10th Electoral Districts) by open list proportional representation (using a 5% electoral threshold) with seats allocated using the d'Hondt method
- 3 seats are elected in a special electoral district (11th Electoral District) for Croatian citizens living abroad
- 8 seats are elected from an electoral district for national minorities (12th Electoral District): 3 seats for Serbian, 1 seat for Italian, 1 seat for Hungarian, 1 seat for Czech and Slovak, 1 seat for Albanian, Bosnian, Macedonian, Montenegrin and Slovenian, and 1 seat for Austrian, Bulgarian, German, Jewish, Polish, Roma, Romanian, Rusyn, Russian, Turkish, Ukrainian and Vlach national minority

== Opinion polls ==
The following graph depicts the evolution of standings of the two main political parties and other parties in the poll average since last parliamentary elections.

HDZ SDP Most ŽZ BM 365 IDS-DDI Pametno HNS-LD HSS SSIP GLAS NHR NLMK Hrast / HS DPMŠ ZLK

=== Seat predictions ===
(excluding electoral districts XI and XII) Exit poll

Date of publication	Polling Firm	HDZ	Restart Coalition	DPMŠ-led coalition	Most	Green-Left	ŽZ	HNS	BM 365	IDS	P-IP	NS–R	NLMP	Lead
5 Jul 2020	Final Results	66	41	16	8	7	-	1	-	(Note: with Restart coalition)	3	1		25
5 Jul 2020	IPSOS 19:00 UTC+2	61	44	16	8	8	-	-	-		3	-		17
Average		53	57	18	7	4	-	-	-		1	-		4
4 Jul 2020	IPSOS	52	51	18	9	6	-	-	-		3	1		1
2 Jul 2020	Promocija plus	55	56	18	6	3	1	-	-		1	-		1
29 Jun 2020	2x1 komunikacije	51	63	17	6	2	-	1	-		-	-		12
27 Jun 2020	Promocija plus	54	60	18	5	2	1	-	-		-	-		6
13 Jun 2020	2x1 komunikacije	52	64	15	8	-	-	1	-		-	-		12
15 May 2020	2x1 komunikacije	54	64	14	3	-	-	-	1	3	-	-	1	10

== Results ==
Results of the election based on the majority of votes in each municipality of Croatia and Zagreb's four electoral districts HDZ-led coalition Restart Coalition HNS–LD DPMŠ-led coalition NS–R Enough of Robbery Lacković independent list IP–Pametno–Fokus

Results by municipality, showing vote share of the winning party.

The ruling HDZ obtained an upset victory over the Restart Coalition, who had previously been leading in opinion polls for several weeks prior to the elections. The HDZ likely received a boost from public approval over its handling of the COVID-19 pandemic. The pandemic also caused voter turnout to be the lowest since the first democratic elections in 1990, with under half of registered voters participating.

Party	Votes	%	Seats	+/–
HDZ–HSLS–HDS–HDSSB (Note: Of the 66 seats won by the HDZ-led alliance, the HDZ won 62, the Croatian Social Liberal Party won two and the Croatian Christian Democratic Party and Croatian Democratic Alliance of Slavonia and Baranja won one each.)	621,035	37.26	66	+5
SDP–HSS–GLAS–IDS–HSU–SNAGA–PGS (Note: Of the 41 seats won by the Restart coalition, the Social Democratic Party won 33, the Istrian Democratic Assembly three, the Croatian Peasant Party two, the Croatian Party of Pensioners one, the Civic Liberal Alliance one, the Damir Bajs Independent List one.)	414,645	24.87	41	–4
DPMŠ–HS–HKS–HRAST−BzH–ZL−SU (Note: Of the 16 seats won by the DPMŠ-led coalition, the DPMŠ won eleven, the Croatian Sovereignists three, Croatian Conservative Party one and the Bloc for Croatia one.)	181,493	10.89	16	New
Bridge of Independent Lists	123,194	7.39	8	–5
Green–Left (M!–RF–NL–ORaH) (Note: Of the seven seats won by the Green–Left Coalition, four were won by We can! and one each by the Workers' Front, the New Left and an independent candidate (Bojan Glavašević).)	116,483	6.99	7	New
IP–Smart–Focus (Note: The three seats won by the IP–Smart–Focus coalition were divided equally between IP, Smart and Focus.)	66,399	3.98	3	+3
Enough of Robbery	37,628	2.26	0	–8
Croatian People's Party – Liberal Democrats	21,727	1.30	1	–8
People's Party – Reformists	16,900	1.01	1	0
Bandić Milan 365 – Labour and Solidarity Party	9,897	0.59	0	–1
Croatian Civic Party	7,399	0.44	0	0
Right League (NHR and HSP)	7,266	0.44	0	New
Democrats–HL–RI	6,594	0.40	0	New
Authentic Croatian Party of Rights	5,343	0.32	0	0
Pensioners Together Bloc	5,268	0.32	0	0
Croatian Democratic Party	2,465	0.15	0	0
Strength of Slavonia and Baranja	2,294	0.14	0	New
Socialist Labour Party of Croatia	2,149	0.13	0	0
Union of Kvarner	2,044	0.12	0	New
Movement for a Modern Croatia	1,307	0.08	0	0
My Beloved Croatia	978	0.06	0	New
Authentic Croatian Peasant Party	958	0.06	0	0
BDSH–HBPS	768	0.05	0	0
Croatian Party of the Future	732	0.04	0	New
Croatian Civil Resistance Party	714	0.04	0	New
Independent List of Bura	626	0.04	0	New
Free Croatia	605	0.04	0	0
Croatian Perspective Party	576	0.03	0	0
Croatian Community Party	405	0.02	0	New
Croatian Party of Order	338	0.02	0	0
Alphabet of Democracy	219	0.01	0	New
Independents	8,524	0.51	0	–1
National minorities			8	0
Total	1,666,973	100.00	151	0
Valid votes	1,666,973	97.73		
Invalid/blank votes	38,713	2.27		
Total votes	1,705,686	100.00		
Registered voters/turnout	3,672,555	46.44		
Source: Izbori

=== Results by constituency ===
Constituency	HDZ		Restart		DPMŠ		Most		Green-Left		IP - P - F		HNS		NS R	
Constituency	%	Seats	%	Seats	%	Seats	%	Seats	%	Seats	%	Seats	%	Seats	%	Seats
I	28.3	5	22.3	3	9.0	1	8.1	1	21.1	3	6.3	1	0.2	-	0.2	-
II	34.3	6	24.6	4	13.5	2	7.9	1	5.5	1	3.5	-	0.6	-	3.2	-
III	29.5	5	37.7	6	6.2	1	2.8	-	3.4	-	3.7	-	5.8	1	5.5	1
IV	44.0	8	20.5	3	16.6	3	4.8	-	2.2	-	2.1	-	4.6	-	0.2	-
V	47.8	8	19.2	3	19.8	3	5.8	0	1.5	-	1.6	-	0.4	-	0.4	-
VI	37.9	6	24.2	4	11.0	2	7.0	1	9.5	1	3.7	-	0.5	-	part of Restart	
VII	35.9	6	24.5	4	9.5	1	6.8	1	10.5	1	6.4	1	0.4	-	0.3	-
VIII	22.5	4	44.5	8	4.7	-	5.8	1	8.5	1	3.6	-	0.5	-	0.2	-
IX	47.5	8	17.2	3	11.9	2	10.0	1	2.4	-	2.7	-	0.4	-	0.3	-
X	40.9	7	20.5	3	10.3	1	12.1	2	4.3	-	5.4	1	0.8	-	0.2	-
XI	63.0	3	-	-	-	-	11.1	0	1.8	-	0.5	-	-	-	0.4	-
Total	37.3	66	24.9	41	10.9	16	7.4	8	7.0	7	4.0	3	1.3	1	1.0	1
Source: Results

Note: The eight members elected in Electoral district XII are not shown here.

== Aftermath ==
Acknowledging his party's defeat in the legislative elections, Davor Bernardić stepped down as the leader of Social Democrats.

On 6 July 2020 HDZ leader Andrej Plenković announced that he had collected the support of the 76 MPs needed to form a government, following coalition negotiations. He announced that he had received support from his party and allies, the HNS – LD, the NS-R, and all 8 representatives of the national minorities. The Second Plenković cabinet was confirmed by Parliament on 23 July 2020.

== See also ==
- 2020 in Croatia
- COVID-19 pandemic in Croatia
