= Opinion polling for the 2020 Croatian parliamentary election =

In the run-up to the 2020 Croatian parliamentary election, various organisations carried out monthly opinion polling to gauge voting intention in Croatia. Results of such polls are displayed in this article. The date range is from after the previous parliamentary election, held on 11 September 2016, to 5 July 2020 when the 2020 election was held.

== Polling average ==
=== Graph ===
The following graph depicts the evolution of standings of the two main political parties and other parties in the poll average since last parliamentary elections.

HDZ SDP Most ŽZ BM 365 IDS-DDI Pametno HNS-LD HSS SSIP GLAS NHR NLMK Hrast / HS DPMŠ ZLK

=== Table ===
Polling average
Source	Date updated	Restart	HDZ	DPMŠ	Most	ŽZ	Others/Undecided (Note: Calculated by taking the difference of 100% and all other political parties combined)	Lead
Promocija plus	2 Jul 2020	30.0%	29.8%	10.5%	5.4%	1.5%	23.2%	0.2%
2x1 komunikacije	29 Jun 2020	45.0%	36.4%	12.1%	4.3%	0.0%	2.1%	8.6%
IPSOS PULS	4 Jul 2020	25.9%	27.8%	11.6%	6.7%	0.4%	27.6%	1.9%
Average		33.6%	31.3%	11.4%	5.4%	0.6%	17.7%	2.3%

== Coalition standings ==
Poll results published by major national televisions are listed in the table below in reverse chronological order, showing the most recent first, and using the date of publication. The highest percentage figure in each polling survey is displayed in bold, and the background shaded in the leading coalition's color. In the instance that there is a tie, then no figure is shaded. The lead column on the right shows the percentage-point difference between the two coalitions with the highest figures. When a specific poll does not show a data figure for a coalition, the coalition's cell corresponding to that poll is shown empty.

Date of publication	Polling Firm	HDZ	Restart	DPMŠ	Most	Green-Left	ŽZ-PH	HNS	BM 365	IDS	P-F	SIP	IP	NHR	Others	Undecided	Lead
26 Jun 2020	IPSOS	**26.7**	24.6	11.1	6.8	4.5	3.3	0.6	0.5	(Note: with Restart coalition)	4.1	(Note: with ŽZ)	(Note: with P-F)	-	3.8	12.5	2.1
7 Jun 2020	Promocija plus	26.6	**28.6**	13.5	4.1	2.4	1.7	1.1	1.0		1.8	1.4	1.9	-	4.0	11.9	2.0
25 May 2020	IPSOS	**28.0**	24.9	13.5	4.8	2.6	1.9	0.7	0.7	1.8	2.4	2.4	2.2	-	3.8	10.3	3.1
20 May 2020	Promocija plus	29.7	**32.8**	9.9	4.3	-	0.8	1.4	1.0	1.6	1.7	1.1	-	0.6	1.4	12.0	3.1
10 May 2020	Promocija plus	30.2	**31.5**	10.7	4.0	-	1.1	1.6	1.1	1.9	1.0	0.9	0.5	0.5	1.9	11.5	1.3

== Seat projections ==
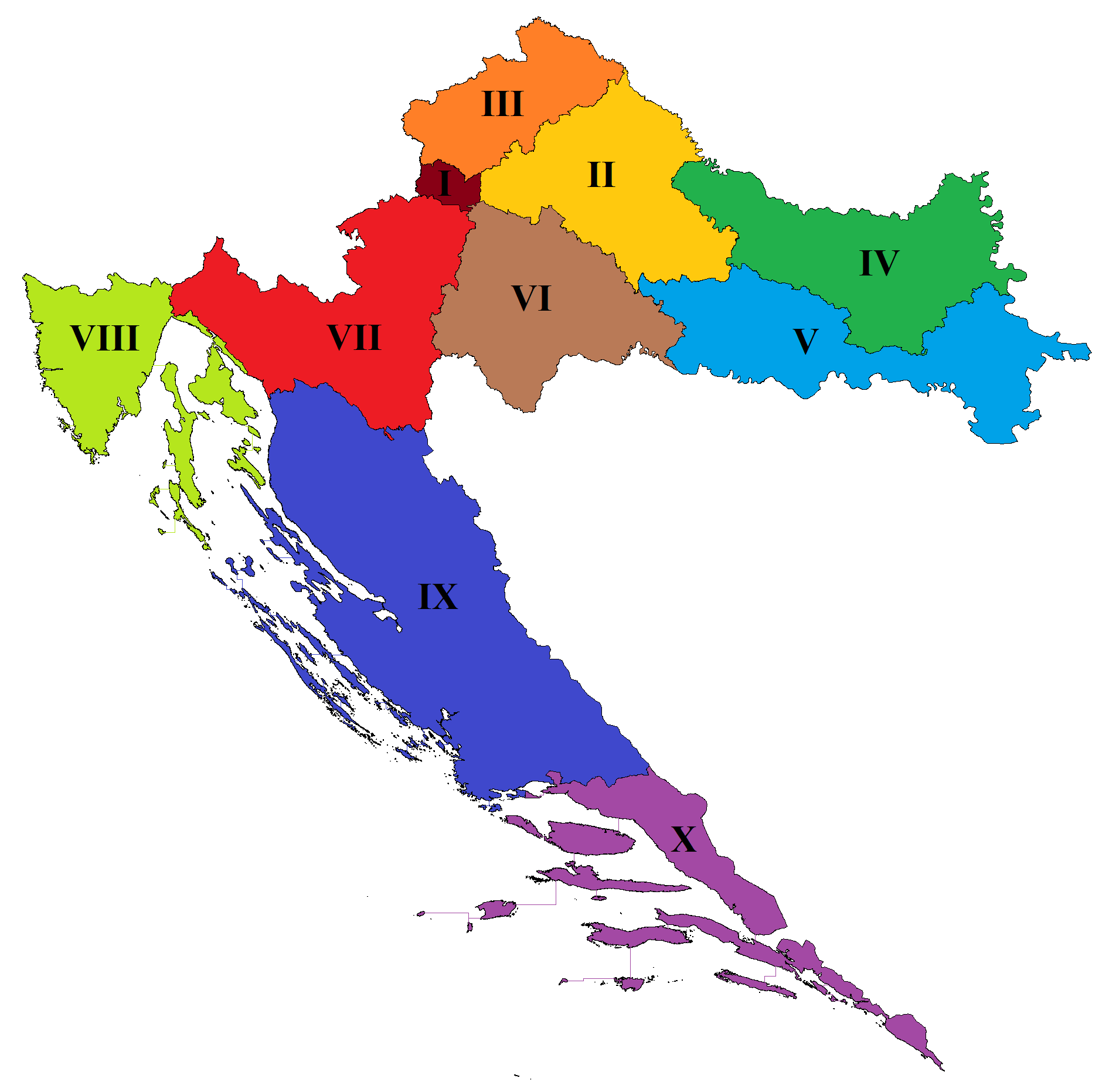
Geographic electoral districts (I-X)

=== National ===
(excluding electoral districts XI and XII) Exit poll

Date of publication	Polling Firm	HDZ	Restart Coalition	DPMŠ-led coalition	Most	Green-Left	ŽZ	HNS	BM 365	IDS	P-IP	NS–R	NLMP	Lead
5 Jul 2020	Final Results	66	41	16	8	7	-	1	-		3	1		25
5 Jul 2020	IPSOS 19:00 UTC+2	61	44	16	8	8	-	-	-		3	-		17
Average		53	57	18	7	4	-	-	-		1	-		4
4 Jul 2020	IPSOS	52	51	18	9	6	-	-	-		3	1		1
2 Jul 2020	Promocija plus	55	56	18	6	3	1	-	-		1	-		1
29 Jun 2020	2x1 komunikacije	51	63	17	6	2	-	1	-		-	-		12
27 Jun 2020	Promocija plus	54	60	18	5	2	1	-	-		-	-		6
13 Jun 2020	2x1 komunikacije	52	64	15	8	-	-	1	-		-	-		12
15 May 2020	2x1 komunikacije	54	64	14	3	-	-	-	1	3	-	-	1	10

=== Per electoral district ===
==== Electoral district I ====
Date of publication	Polling Firm	HDZ	Restart Coalition	DPMŠ-led coalition	Most	Green-Left	ŽZ	HNS	BM 365	P-IP	Lead
Average		4	5	1	1	2	-	-	-	1	1
3 Jul 2020	IPSOS	4	4	1	1	3	-	-	-	1	Tie
30 Jun 2020	Promocija plus	4	5	1	1	2	-	-	-	1	1
30 Jun 2020	2x1 komunikacije	5	6	1	-	2	-	-	-	-	1
27 Jun 2020	Promocija plus	4	6	2	1	1	-	-	-	-	4
13 Jun 2020	2x1 komunikacije	4	8	1	1	-	-	-	-	-	4
8 Jun 2020	2x1 komunikacije	5	7	1	1	-	-	-	-	-	2
15 May 2020	2x1 komunikacije	5	8	1	-	-	-	-	-	-	3

==== Electoral district II ====
Date of publication	Polling Firm	HDZ	Restart Coalition	DPMŠ-led coalition	Most	Green-Left	ŽZ	HNS	BM 365	P-IP	Lead
Average		5	6	2	1	-	-	-	-	-	1
3 Jul 2020	IPSOS	6	5	2	1	-	-	-	-	-	1
30 Jun 2020	Promocija plus	5	6	2	1	-	-	-	-	-	1
30 Jun 2020	2x1 komunikacije	5	6	2	1	-	-	-	-	-	1
24 Jun 2020	Promocija plus	5	6	2	1	-	-	-	-	-	1
13 Jun 2020	2x1 komunikacije	5	6	2	1	-	-	-	-	-	1
8 Jun 2020	2x1 komunikacije	5	6	2	1	-	-	-	-	-	1
15 May 2020	2x1 komunikacije	6	6	1	-	-	-	-	1	-	Tie

==== Electoral district III ====
Date of publication	Polling Firm	HDZ	Restart Coalition	DPMŠ-led coalition	Most	Green-Left	ŽZ	HNS	BM 365	P-IP	NS–R	NLMP	Lead
Average		4	9	1	-	-	-	-	-	-	-		5
1 Jul 2020	IPSOS	3	8	2	-	-	-	-	-	-	1		5
1 Jul 2020	Promocija plus	4	9	1	-	-	-	-	-	-	-		5
30 Jun 2020	2x1 komunikacije	3	10	-	1	-	-	-	-	-	-		7
24 Jun 2020	Promocija plus	4	9	1	-	-	-	-	-	-	-		5
13 Jun 2020	2x1 komunikacije	3	10	-	1	-	-	-	-	-	-		7
8 Jun 2020	2x1 komunikacije	3	11	-	-	-	-	-	-	-	-		8
15 May 2020	2x1 komunikacije	4	9	-	-	-	-	-	-	-	-	1	5

==== Electoral district IV ====
Date of publication	Polling Firm	HDZ	Restart Coalition	DPMŠ-led coalition	Most	Green-Left	ŽZ	HNS	BM 365	P-IP	Lead
Average		6	4	4	-	-	-	-	-	-	2
1 Jul 2020	IPSOS	6	4	3	1	-	-	-	-	-	2
1 Jul 2020	Promocija plus	7	4	3	-	-	-	-	-	-	4
30 Jun 2020	2x1 komunikacije	5	4	4	-	-	-	1	-	-	1
24 Jun 2020	Promocija plus	6	4	4	-	-	-	-	-	-	3
13 Jun 2020	2x1 komunikacije	5	5	3	-	-	-	1	-	-	Tie
15 May 2020	2x1 komunikacije	5	6	3	-	-	-	-	-	-	1

==== Electoral district V ====
Date of publication	Polling Firm	HDZ	Restart Coalition	DPMŠ-led coalition	Most	Green-Left	ŽZ	HNS	BM 365	P-IP	Lead
Average		7	4	3	-	-	-	-	-	-	3
1 Jul 2020	IPSOS	6	3	4	1	-	-	-	-	-	2
1 Jul 2020	Promocija plus	7	4	3	-	-	-	-	-	-	4
30 Jun 2020	2x1 komunikacije	7	4	3	-	-	-	-	-	-	3
25 Jun 2020	Promocija plus	7	4	3	-	-	-	-	-	-	3
13 Jun 2020	2x1 komunikacije	7	4	3	-	-	-	-	-	-	3
15 May 2020	2x1 komunikacije	6	5	3	-	-	-	-	-	-	1

==== Electoral district VI ====
Date of publication	Polling Firm	HDZ	Restart Coalition	DPMŠ-led coalition	Most	Green-Left	ŽZ	HNS	BM 365	P-IP	Lead
Average		5	6	2	1	-	-	-	-	-	1
4 Jul 2020	IPSOS	5	6	1	1	1	-	-	-	-	1
30 Jun 2020	Promocija plus	6	5	2	1	-	-	-	-	-	1
30 Jun 2020	2x1 komunikacije	5	7	1	1	-	-	-	-	-	2
25 Jun 2020	Promocija plus	5	6	2	1	-	-	-	-	-	1
13 Jun 2020	2x1 komunikacije	6	6	1	1	-	-	-	-	-	Tie
15 May 2020	2x1 komunikacije	6	7	1	-	-	-	-	-	-	1

==== Electoral district VII ====
Date of publication	Polling Firm	HDZ	Restart Coalition	DPMŠ-led coalition	Most	Green-Left	ŽZ	HNS	BM 365	P-IP	Lead
Average		5	6	2	1	1	-	-	-	-	1
4 Jul 2020	IPSOS	5	6	1	1	1	-	-	-	-	1
30 Jun 2020	Promocija plus	5	5	2	1	1	-	-	-	-	Tie
30 Jun 2020	2x1 komunikacije	5	7	1	1	-	-	-	-	-	2
25 Jun 2020	Promocija plus	5	6	2	-	1	-	-	-	-	1
13 Jun 2020	2x1 komunikacije	6	6	1	1	-	-	-	-	-	Tie
15 May 2020	2x1 komunikacije	6	7	1	-	-	-	-	-	-	1

==== Electoral district VIII ====
Date of publication	Polling Firm	HDZ	Restart Coalition	DPMŠ-led coalition	Most	Green-Left	ŽZ	HNS	BM 365	IDS	P-IP	Lead
Average		4	10	-	-	-	-	-	-		-	6
2 Jul 2020	IPSOS	3	8	1	-	1	-	-	-		1	5
2 Jul 2020	Promocija plus	4	10	-	-	-	-	-	-		-	6
30 Jun 2020	2x1 komunikacije	3	10	-	1	-	-	-	-		-	7
26 Jun 2020	Promocija plus	4	10	-	-	-	-	-	-		-	6
13 Jun 2020	2x1 komunikacije	3	10	-	1	-	-	-	-		-	7
8 Jun 2020	2x1 komunikacije	3	10	-	1	-	-	-	-		-	7
15 May 2020	2x1 komunikacije	3	7	-	1	-	-	-	-	3	-	4

==== Electoral district IX ====
Date of publication	Polling Firm	HDZ	Restart Coalition	DPMŠ-led coalition	Most	Green-Left	ŽZ	HNS	BM 365	P-IP	Lead
Average		7	4	2	1	-	-	-	-	-	3
2 Jul 2020	IPSOS	7	4	2	1	-	-	-	-	-	3
2 Jul 2020	Promocija plus	7	3	2	1	-	1	-	-	-	4
30 Jun 2020	2x1 komunikacije	7	4	2	1	-	-	-	-	-	3
26 Jun 2020	Promocija plus	7	4	1	1	-	1	-	-	-	3
13 Jun 2020	2x1 komunikacije	7	4	2	1	-	-	-	-	-	3
8 Jun 2020	2x1 komunikacije	7	5	1	1	-	-	-	-	-	2
15 May 2020	2x1 komunikacije	7	4	2	1	-	-	-	-	-	3

==== Electoral district X ====
Date of publication	Polling Firm	HDZ	Restart Coalition	DPMŠ-led coalition	Most	Green-Left	ŽZ	HNS	BM 365	P-IP	Lead
Average		6	5	2	1	-	-	-	-	-	1
2 Jul 2020	IPSOS	7	3	1	2	-	-	-	-	1	4
2 Jul 2020	Promocija plus	6	5	2	1	-	-	-	-	-	1
30 Jun 2020	2x1 komunikacije	6	5	2	1	-	-	-	-	-	1
26 Jun 2020	Promocija plus	7	5	1	1	-	-	-	-	-	2
13 Jun 2020	2x1 komunikacije	6	5	2	1	-	-	-	-	-	1
15 May 2020	2x1 komunikacije	6	5	2	1	-	-	-	-	-	1

== Individual party standings ==
Poll results published by major national televisions are listed in the table below in reverse chronological order, showing the most recent first, and using the date of publication. The highest percentage figure in each polling survey is displayed in bold, and the background shaded in the leading party's color. In the instance that there is a tie, then no figure is shaded. The lead column on the right shows the percentage-point difference between the two parties with the highest figures. When a specific poll does not show a data figure for a party, the party's cell corresponding to that poll is shown empty.

Date of publication	Polling Firm	HDZ	SDP	Most	ŽZ	HNS	HSS	BM 365	IDS	P	SSIP	GLAS	NHR	NLMK	Hrast	HS	DPMŠ	Others	Undecided	Lead
7 Jun 2020	Promocija plus	26.6	**28.6**	4.1	1.7	1.1		1.0		1.8	1.9		-	-	(Note: with DPMŠ)		13.5	7.8 (Note: incl. 1.4 SIP and 2.4 Green-Left)	11.9	2.0
25 May 2020	IPSOS	**28.0**	24.9	4.8	1.9	0.7		0.7	1.8	2.4	2.4		-	-			13.5	8.6 (Note: incl. 2.4 SIP and 2.6 Green-Left)	-	3.1
20 May 2020	Promocija plus	**29.7**	28.7	4.3	0.8	1.4	2.2	1.0	1.6	1.7	-	0.8	0.6	-	-	0.6	9.3	1.4 (Note: incl. 0.6 HSLS)	12.0	1.0
10 May 2020	Promocija plus	**30.2**	27.8	4.0	1.1	1.6	2.7	1.1	1.9	1.0	0.5	0.5	0.5	0.6	-	0.6	10.1	1.9 (Note: incl. 0.6 HSLS)	11.5	2.4
24 Apr 2020	IPSOS PULS	**27.9**	23.2	5.1	1.3	1.0	1.1	1.1	2.6	2.8	-	-	-	-	-	1.6	10.5	5.3	7.1	4.7
20 Apr 2020	Promocija plus	**29.9**	27.4	4.1	1.6	1.3	2.1	1.4	1.5	1.5	0.9	0.8	0.9	1.0	-	1.1	9.2	-	10.6	2.5
10 Apr 2020	2x1 komunikacije	26.1	**30.7**	3.9	1.2	-	-	0.9	2.0	-	-	0.9	1.1	-	-	1.1	12.5	-	11.9	4.6
5 Apr 2020	Promocija plus	**28.4**	27.0	3.8	1.9	1.3	2.7	1.1	1.8	1.2	-	-	-	-	-	1.0	10.9	1.6	10.5	1.4
25 Mar 2020	IPSOS PULS	**25.2**	23.7	4.4	3.0	1.3	1.3	1.7	1.6	2.3	-	-	-	-	-	-	12.5	9.5	6.8	1.5
20 Mar 2020	Promocija plus	27.3	**29.3**	3.8	1.1	1.1	2.5	1.4	1.3	1.3	0.8	0.8	0.9	2.0	-	1.1	10.5	-	10.5	2.0
13 Mar 2020	2x1 komunikacije	21.4	**31.0**	3.0	1.7	0.6	1.1	-	1.8	-	-	2.0	2.0	-	-	-	14.0	-	11.6	9.6
8 Mar 2020	Promocija plus	26.7	**29.3**	4.8	1.2	1.2	2.3	1.4	1.3	1.1	0.9	0.7	0.9	2.0	-	0.9	11.5	1.2	9.8	2.6
25 Feb 2020	IPSOS PULS	24.8	**25.2**	4.4	1.7	0.7	2.5	2.0	2.9	2.1	1.3	-	0.1	-	-	1.4	10.1	9.8	5.3	0.4
21 Feb 2020	Promocija plus	26.9	**29.1**	3.9	1.1	1.2	2.4	1.3	1.1	1.3	0.8	0.8	1.1	2.5	-	2.1	9.9	1.7	10.0	2.2
14 Feb 2020	2x1 komunikacije	21.7	**30.3**	3.8	1.1	-	1.2	-	2.0	-	-	1.8	1.8	-	-	-	11.6	-	11.4	8.6
6 Feb 2020	Promocija plus	26.8	**28.9**	5.1	1.0	1.3	2.3	1.4	1.3	1.3	0.9	0.6	0.9	2.5	-	2.2	9.4	1.6	10.6	2.1
24 Jan 2020	IPSOS PULS	25.6	**27.1**	3.0	2.0	0.1	1.3	-	0.9	2.1	1.0	1.4	-	-	-	1.7	16.6	2.9	9.9	1.5
17 Jan 2020	2x1 komunikacije	22.0	**28.9**	4.0	3.7	-	1.7	-	1.4	-	-	-	1.6	-	-	1.3	10.9	-	14.0	6.9
12 Jan 2020	Promocija plus	26.9	**27.8**	5.6	2.1	1.7	3.0	1.4	1.3	1.3	0.7	0.5	0.7	3.0	-	3.9	-	3.7	12.9	0.9
2020
25 Dec 2019	IPSOS PULS	**25.2**	21.5	3.7	4.7	1.4	2.4	2.5	1.5	2.9	2.5	1.1	-	5.7	-	2.5	-	7.0	6.0	3.7
20 Dec 2019	Promocija plus	**27.0**	24.8	4.4	-	-	3.1	-	-	-	-	-	-	5.7	-	4.7	-	2.7	13.5	2.2
11 Dec 2019	Promocija plus	**27.3**	25.2	6.2	1.5	2.0	3.1	1.7	1.4	1.1	0.6	0.6	0.7	6.6	-	3.2	-	2.5	12.5	2.1
26 Nov 2019	IPSOS PULS	**27.1**	20.7	3.4	3.9	1.3	2.3	4.2	1.9	2.0	1.0	-	1.6	6.9	-	-	-	8.1	7.9	6.4
20 Nov 2019	Promocija plus	**27.5**	25.4	5.8	1.8	1.7	3.5	2.0	1.4	1.0	0.9	0.8	1.4	7.6	-	3.5	-	1.4	11.6	2.1
17 Nov 2019	2x1 komunikacije	25.7	**26.9**	4.8	2.8	-	-	-	1.3	1.3	-	-	2.4	5.0	(in HS)	-	-	-	22.6	1.2
10 Nov 2019	Promocija plus	**27.9**	24.8	5.7	2.8	2.1	3.4	2.0	1.3	-	-	-	1.3	6.2	1.5	-	-	3.8	11.5	3.1
28 Oct 2019	2x1 komunikacije	24.8	**28.2**	4.9	2.9	0.5	-	-	1.8	-	-	-	2.1	2.8	-	-	-	-	21.2	3.4
25 Oct 2019	IPSOS PULS	**28.1**	21.5	5.0	4.9	1.3	2.4	3.6	2.1	1.8	1.3	0.2	1.1	5.3	1.2	-	-	-	7.1	6.6
20 Oct 2019	Promocija plus	**27.4**	24.6	5.6	1.8	1.7	3.3	1.9	1.3	0.7	1.1	0.9	2.2	6.0	1.4	-	-	3.4	10.9	2.8
6 Oct 2019	Promocija plus	**27.4**	24.3	5.5	1.9	1.7	3.5	2.0	-	-	-	-	2.2	6.1	-	-	-	3.8	11.0	3.1
26 Sep 2019	IPSOS PULS	**27.1**	20.3	5.7	4.0	1.6	2.6	4.2	2.3	2.0	1.2	0.1	1.5	6.1	1.6	-	-	-	7.3	6.8
20 Sep 2019	Promocija plus	**27.6**	24.8	5.1	2.2	-	3.1	-	-	-	-	-	2.3	6.0	-	-	-	-	11.6	2.8
20 Sep 2019	2x1 komunikacije	24.9	**28.1**	3.4	2.2	-	-	-	1.7	1.1	-	-	2.2	3.2	-	-	-	-	31.1	3.2
8 Sep 2019	Promocija plus	**27.0**	24.4	5.0	1.9	1.9	3.3	1.9	-	-	-	-	2.6	5.9	-	-	-	3.5	13.4	2.6
24 Aug 2019	IPSOS PULS	**27.4**	21.0	6.0	3.6	1.7	2.2	4.0	2.2	1.9	1.0	-	1.5	6.1	1.8	-	-	3.8	7.4	6.4
24 Aug 2019	2x1 komunikacije	20.9	**23.8**	3.4	4.0	1.9	-	-	1.7	-	-	-	2.9	4.0	-	-	-	-	27.3	2.9
4 Aug 2019	Promocija plus	**26.4**	22.6	4.7	2.5	2.2	3.4	1.9	-	-	-	1.4	3.4	5.6	-	-	-	3.4	13.2	3.8
25 Jul 2019	IPSOS PULS	**24.2**	21.4	5.0	3.2	0.8	3.4	3.6	1.8	2.4	0.6	1.6	2.0	6.7	1.6	-	-	5.6	9.2	2.8
15 Jul 2019	2x1 komunikacije	21.2	**23.3**	1.9	2.8	-	-	-	0.9	-	-	0.9	2.7	2.9	-	-	-	-	27.7	2.1
7 Jul 2019	Promocija plus	**25.5**	21.5	4.7	4.3	3.2	3.3	1.7	-	-	-	-	4.3	7.2	1.9	-	-	3.4	11.9	4.0
26 Jun 2019	IPSOS PULS	**24.9**	18.3	6.1	6.0	2.3	3.0	2.4	2.6	1.0	0.5	0.4	1.8	10.9	0.6	-	-	-	7.4	6.6
17 Jun 2019	2x1 komunikacije	**21.0**	20.5	3.8	5.1	0.9	1.3	0.7	2.0	1.0	0.8	2.2	4.2	4.8	0.5	-	-	3.1	22.8	0.5
9 June 2019	Promocija plus	**26.5**	20.4	4.0	5.4	2.9	3.1	2.0	-	2.2	0.9	0.9	4.3	7.0	-	-	-	4.0	10.3	6.1
1 June 2019	2x1 komunikacije	**19.5**	17.4	4.7	5.7	-	1.3	1.4	1.7	-	1.0	-	4.2	6.0	5.9	-	-	11.5	20.7	2.1
26 May	**2019 European Parliament election in Croatia**																			
23 May 2019	IPSOS PULS	**25.0**	13.0	7.2	11.6	2.1	2.9	4.7	1.8	3.0	3.8	1.4	3.9	-	1.3	-	-	6.5	6.7	12.0
20 May 2019	Promocija plus	**27.2**	18.1	6.8	7.8	2.8	3.1	2.9	1.3	1.6	2.9	1.9	3.4	3.8	1.6	-	-	5.0	9.7	9.1
8 May 2019	Promocija plus	**27.3**	17.4	6.6	9.6	2.8	3.3	3.0	-	-	2.6	-	3.8	2.8		-	-	-	-	9.9
25 Apr 2019	IPSOS PULS	**25.5**	13.3	6.5	11.9	2.1	2.8	3.5	1.7	2.5	4.9	2.1	3.1			-	-	7.4	8.5	12.2
20 Apr 2019	Promocija plus	**27.6**	17.8	7.0	8.1	2.3	3.2	2.4	1.1	2.2	3.6	2.1	4.0	3.1		-	-	2.8	9.8	9.8
7 Apr 2019	Promocija plus	**28.0**	16.9	6.8	8.5	-	3.4	2.6	-	-	3.7	-	3.6	2.8		-	-	-	-	11.1
25 Mar 2019	IPSOS PULS	**27.0**	14.0	6.0	11.8	1.2	3.2	4.5	1.7	1.4	5.1	1.5	2.2	-		-	-	6.3	9.3	13.0
20 Mar 2019	Promocija plus	**27.8**	16.5	6.4	10.6	2.3	3.8	2.5	1.3	2.4	3.2	2.5	3.5	-		-	-	3.0	11.3	11.3
6 Mar 2019	Promocija plus	**28.1**	17.0	6.8	10.4	2.5	3.6	2.7	-	-	3.4	2.9	3.6	-		-	-	-	-	11.1
28 Feb 2019	2x1 komunikacije	**26.4**	18.1	7.9	10.5	1.2	1.5	-	1.4	1.4	4.1	5.0	5.4	-		-	-	-	12.9	8.3
25 Feb 2019	IPSOS PULS	**28.4**	13.7	6.3	12.4	1.8	3.7	4.2	1.8	1.8	5.6	1.5	2.0	-		-	-	11.4	5.4	14.7
6 Feb 2019	Promocija plus	**28.4**	15.8	6.5	10.9	1.6	3.2	2.0	1.6	1.6	4.6	3.8	3.3	-		-	-	5.2	11.6	12.6
2 Feb 2019	2x1 komunikacije	**27.0**	18.4	6.1	10.9	1.1	1.4	0.4	1.4	1.5	2.4	5.2	6.8	-		-	-	-	13.4	8.6
25 Jan 2019	IPSOS PULS	**28.8**	14.3	6.8	13.8	1.8	3.9	4	1.6	2.6	-	1.4	1.8	-		-	-	11.9	7.3	14.5
9 Jan 2019	Promocija plus	**29.1**	16.1	7.2	13.7	1.7	2.6	1.9	1.4	1.7	-	1.5	2.9	-		-	-	7.0	13.2	13.0
2019
28 Dec 2018	Ninamedia	**23.4**	17.1	4.8	8.3	0.7	0.9	1.8	1.7	-	-	2.9	3.2	-		-	-	4.8	27.7	6.3
27 Dec 2018	2x1 komunikacije	**28.4**	18.3	6.2	11.1	1.1	0.9	0.8	1.4	1.4	-	3.7	5.2	-		-	-	-	17.6	10.1
24 Dec 2018	IPSOS PULS	**28.9**	14.8	6.3	14.9	1.8	3.6	3.0	1.6	2.5	-	1.1	1.0	-		-	-	11.8	8.6	14.0
8 Dec 2018	Promocija plus	**28.1**	17.0	7.3	12.4	2.1	3.1	2.7	1.5	1.9	-	1.7	2.7	-		-	-	3.4	12.8	11.1
23 Nov 2018	IPSOS PULS	**29.3**	14.6	6.0	13.5	2.3	3.6	3.8	1.5	2.9	-	-	2.1	-		-	-	11.0	9.4	14.7
23 Nov 2018	2x1 komunikacije	**27.2**	19.9	6.1	9.2	0.9	0.9	0.9	1.7	1.9	-	3.0	5.5	-		-	-	-	16.0	7.3
8 Nov 2018	Promocija plus	**28.4**	17.4	6.3	12.1	1.7	3.2	2.1	1.9	1.9	-	-	-	-		-	-	11.7	13.3	11.0
27 Oct 2018	2x1 komunikacije	**26.6**	19.8	6.7	9.2	0.9	1.4	0.5	1.1	1.4	-	2.5	5.1	-		-	-	-	16.6	6.8
25 Oct 2018	IPSOS PULS	**29.1**	16.3	6.6	13.2	1.5	3.3	3.9	1.8	3.2	-	-	-	-		-	-	12.0	9.1	12.8
6 Oct 2018	Promocija plus	**27.5**	17.7	6.0	12.4	1.7	3.5	2.9	1.7	2.8	-	-	-	-		-	-	10.6	13.1	9.8
25 Sep 2018	IPSOS PULS	**29.2**	17.2	8.3	12.6	1.0	3.7	3.3	2.0	2.9	-	-	-	-		-	-	9.2	9.2	12.0
21 Sep 2018	2x1 komunikacije	**27.3**	20.4	7.3	9.9	0.9	0.6	0.6	1.1	1.4	-	3.9	5.0	-		-	-	2.2	14.1	6.9
8 Sep 2018	Promocija plus	**27.2**	18.1	6.8	12.7	1.8	3.3	3.6	1.4	2.5	-	-	-	-		-	-	10.2	12.4	9.1
24 Aug 2018	IPSOS PULS	**28.9**	17.3	7.3	13.4	1.1	4.5	3.8	2.4	3.1	-	-	-	-		-	-	9.6	8.5	11.6
24 Aug 2018	2x1 komunikacije	**24.5**	19.7	7.5	9.0	1.0	0.9	1.4	1.3	1.7	-	2.6	3.2	-		-	-	8.3	15.3	4.8
5 Aug 2018	Promocija plus	**26.0**	18.0	7.5	13.2	1.9	2.6	3.1	1.7	2.4	-	-	-	-		-	-	10.8	12.7	8.0
26 Jul 2018	IPSOS PULS	**27.1**	18.3	7.8	12.3	1.0	3.0	3.7	2.7	3.1	-	-	-	-		-	-	11.4	9.6	8.8
21 Jul 2018	2x1 komunikacije	**25.0**	19.4	6.1	9.6	0.8	0.7	0.7	1.6	-	-	1.6	4.8	-		-	-	-	20.2	5.6
7 Jul 2018	Promocija plus	**25.0**	18.7	7.3	13.4	2.0	2.1	2.5	1.7	2.3	-	-	-	-		-	-	11.7	13.4	6.3
22 Jun 2018	IPSOS PULS	**27.6**	18.5	7.7	13.8	1.8	2.7	3.2	2.2	3.2	-	-	-	-		-	-	9.8	9.5	9.1
15 Jun 2018	2x1 komunikacije	**23.8**	18.5	6.1	10.7	-	-	-	1.7	1.4	-	1.8	3.2	-		-	-	-	22.8	5.3
7 Jun 2018	Promocija plus	**24.8**	19.1	7.8	13.1	1.9	3.0	2.0	1.5	1.5	-	-	-	-		-	-	11.5	13.7	5.7
25 May 2018	IPSOS PULS	**26.6**	18.2	7.7	14.5	1.4	3.6	3.5	2.1	3.7	-	-	-	-		-	-	13.5	8.9	8.4
24 May 2018	2x1 komunikacije	**24.7**	20.7	6.9	11.1	0.4	1.2	-	2.0	-	-	2.5	3.9	-		-	-	-	19.4	3.9
6 May 2018	Promocija plus	**26.4**	20.7	7.6	12.7	2.2	2.4	2.2	1.7	1.7	-	-	-	-		-	-	10.0	13.1	5.7
25 Apr 2018	IPSOS PULS	**27.6**	18	7.1	13.8	1.0	4.6	3.0	2.6	2.9	-	-	-	-		-	-	11.0	8.4	9.6
24 Apr 2018	2x1 komunikacije	**25.1**	21.2	9.9	12.9	1.1	1.3	-	2.0	1.0	-	1.1	4.6	-		-	-	-	15.1	3.9
8 Apr 2018	Promocija plus	**26.8**	21.1	8.1	11.2	1.9	2.1	2.0	1.6	1.6	-	-	-	-		-	-	9.1	14.5	5.7
23 Mar 2018	IPSOS PULS	**29.5**	19.3	7.1	12.9	2.0	2.9	4.1	2.6	3.0	-	-	-	-		-	-	10.2	6.4	10.2
17 Mar 2018	2x1 komunikacije	**26.4**	22.1	7.9	11.1	0.9	-	1.1	1.5	-	-	2.0	4.0	-		-	-	-	13.4	4.3
4 Mar 2018	Promocija plus	**28.9**	20.8	7.1	10.9	2.0	2.5	2.2	1.6	1.4	-	-	-	-		-	-	8.0	14.7	8.1
23 Feb 2018	IPSOS PULS	**29.8**	19.8	6.6	12.3	2.1	2.4	3.0	2.6	3.3	-	-	-	-		-	-	10.0	8.2	10
21 Feb 2018	2x1 komunikacije	**28.2**	21.9	7.8	12.4	1.8	1.0	1.5	1.7	-	-	2.3	3.3	-		-	-	-	-	6.3
4 Feb 2018	Promocija plus	**29.3**	21.1	6.1	11.8	2.0	2.9	2.2	1.1	1.0	-	-	-	-		-	-	7.5	15.0	8.2
27 Jan 2018	2x1 komunikacije	**32.7**	19.0	5.0	9.0	-	-	-	1.2	-	-	-	1.3	-		-	-	-	-	13.7
25 Jan 2018	IPSOS PULS	**30.1**	20.9	6.8	13	2.4	2.1	3.4	2.5	2.4	-	-	-	-		-	-	8.8	7.6	9.2
7 Jan 2018	Promocija plus	**29.0**	20.6	7	11.4	1.4	3.2	2.3	1.2	1.2	-	-	-	-		-	-	8.1	14.6	8.4
2018
24 Dec 2017	IPSOS PULS	**31.9**	18.9	7.3	12.4	2.5	2.7	2.3	1.9	3.0	-	-	-	-		-	-	9.6	7.7	13
13 Dec 2017	2x1 komunikacije	**30.0**	21.0	8.6	11.8	0.7	0.7	0.7	1.3	-	-	0.7	2.0	-		-	-	-	13.2	9.0
7 Dec 2017	Promocija plus	**30.8**	22.3	7.5	11.0	1.3	3.5	2.1	1.1	0.5	-	-	-	-		-	-	8.0	11.9	8.5
25 Nov 2017	2x1 komunikacije	**24.7**	20.2	6.1	4.1	-	-	-	1.3	-	-	-	1.6	-		-	-	-	6.0	4.5
24 Nov 2017	IPSOS PULS	**30.2**	21.2	7.5	11.7	2	2.2	3.4	2.4	1.8	-	-	-	-		-	-	8.5	9.1	9
5 Nov 2017	Promocija plus	**31.3**	22.9	8.7	7.5	1.2	3.1	2.3	1.4	0.8	-	-	-	-		-	-	8.6	12.2	8.4
2 Nov 2017	2x1 komunikacije	**25.4**	20.0	5.3	4.3	-	1.2	-	-	-	-	-	1.1	-		-	-	5.5	6.1	5.4
29 Oct 2017	IPSOS PULS	**32.5**	23.4	6.9	10.5	1.0	1.9	4.2	2.3	-	-	-	-	-		-	-	4.0	7.3	9.1
7 Oct 2017	Promocija plus	**33.5**	22.1	7.8	6.6	1.3	2.9	2.3	1.3	1.5	-	-	-	-		-	-	8.4	12.1	11.4
26 Sep 2017	IPSOS PULS	**31.7**	21.7	7.3	8.8	1.1	2.7	3.9	2.4	1.6	-	-	-	-		-	-	8.3	10.5	10
23 Sep 2017	2x1 komunikacije	**27.5**	19.9	3.8	2.8	-	-	-	1.1	-	-	1.0	1.3	-		-	-	-	-	7.6
6 Sep 2017	Promocija plus	**34.0**	23.1	7.7	6.1	1.6	2.7	2.3	1.2	1.5	-	-	-	-		-	-	8.0	11.7	10.9
26 Aug 2017	IPSOS PULS	**33.7**	23.3	6.7	7.1	1.3	3.0	4.5	2.0	1.4	-	-	-	-		-	-	8.6	8.4	10.4
20 Aug 2017	2x1 komunikacije	**28.5**	23.0	-	-	-	-	-	-	-	-	-	-	-		-	-	-	-	5.5
6 Aug 2017	Promocija plus	**34.2**	22.1	7.8	6.8	2.2	2.5	2.6	1.7	1.1	-	-	-	-		-	-	5.6	10.9	12.1
25 Jul 2017	IPSOS PULS	**33.6**	22.4	6.2	7.6	1.9	2.7	4.7	1.7	1.6	-	-	-	-		-	-	8.3	9.1	11.2
25 Jul 2017	2x1 komunikacije	**24.3**	20.1	3.6	3.3	-	-	-	1.2	-	-	1.9	2.3	-		-	-	-	-	4.2
5 Jul 2017	Promocija plus	**34.3**	23.8	6.4	6.1	2.5	2.4	2.2	1.2	1.9	-	-	-	-		-	-	8.4	10.8	10.5
26 Jun 2017	IPSOS PULS	**34.8**	22.2	7.4	7.3	2.4	3.3	3.6	2.6	2.0	-	-	-	-		-	-	7.7	6.5	12.6
25 Jun 2017	2x1 komunikacije	**24.5**	20.8	6.6	3.7	0.5	-	1.3	1.8	0.1	-	-	3.2	-		-	-	-	-	3.7
6 Jun 2017	Promocija plus	**34.0**	24.8	7.2	6.1	3.0	2.9	1.7	1.8	2.0	-	-	-	-		-	-	6.8	9.8	9.2
24 May 2017	IPSOS PULS	**33.7**	21.7	9.2	7.6	2.8	2.1	3.3	2.6	2.4	-	-	-	-		-	-	7.5	7.2	12.0
20 May 2017	2x1 komunikacije	**23.5**	19.8	-	-	-	-	-	-	-	-	-	-	-		-	-	-	-	3.7
6 May 2017	Promocija plus	**30.8**	24.1	10.2	7.6	3.6	2.3	1.3	1.7	2.0	-	-	-	-		-	-	5.5	10.7	6.7
25 Apr 2017	2x1 komunikacije	**25.4**	19.0	6.4	2.7	2.3	-	1.4	1.8	-	-	-	-	-		-	-	-	-	6.4
24 Apr 2017	IPSOS PULS	**32.2**	22.7	7.7	7.9	2.3	2.4	3.0	3.2	2.3	-	-	-	-		-	-	6.4	10.1	9.5
5 Apr 2017	Promocija plus	**31.3**	22.8	9.6	7.1	3.6	2.0	1.3	1.4	1.9	-	-	-	-		-	-	6.2	12.6	8.5
25 Mar 2017	2x1 komunikacije	**26.2**	19.9	6.0	2.9	2.1	-	1.8	1.9	-	-	-	-	-		-	-	-	-	6.3
24 Mar 2017	IPSOS PULS	**33.3**	23.0	8.6	7.3	2.8	2.3	3.2	3.1	2.1	-	-	-	-		-	-	5.9	6.5	10.3
6 Mar 2017	Promocija plus	**32.8**	21.6	8.0	7.7	3.9	1.9	1.6	1.6	1.7	-	-	-	-		-	-	6.4	12.7	11.2
26 Feb 2017	2x1 komunikacije	**28.0**	19.4	6.5	4.9	2.0	-	-	1.2	-	-	-	-	-		-	-	-	-	8.6
24 Feb 2017	IPSOS PULS	**35.1**	21.9	8.6	9.0	1.7	3.1	3.0	2.2	2.1	-	-	-	-		-	-	7.8	5.7	13.2
5 Feb 2017	Promocija plus	**34.0**	22.3	7.2	5.8	3.9	2.3	1.6	1.7	1.4	-	-	-	-		-	-	6.5	13.2	11.7
25 Jan 2017	IPSOS PULS	**33.6**	22.4	8.8	9.5	1.7	3.2	3.7	2.0	2.1	-	-	-	-		-	-	7.3	5.7	11.2
25 Jan 2017	2x1 komunikacije	**27.1**	20.0	7.9	3.0	-	-	-	-	-	-	-	-	-		-	-	-	-	7.1
6 Jan 2017	Promocija plus	**32.5**	24.7	8.8	4.7	3.5	2.1	1.8	1.4	2.0	-	-	-	-		-	-	6.7	11.8	7.8
6 Jan 2017	2x1 komunikacije	**27.7**	21.0	6.3	3.0	1.0	-	-	1.2	0.1	-	-	-	-		-	-	-	9.9	6.7
2017
24 Dec 2016	IPSOS PULS	**33.2**	23.2	9.6	7.5	1.7	1.9	2.3	2.1	1.7	-	-	-	-		-	-	7.7	9.1	10.0
6 Dec 2016	2x1 komunikacije	**30.7**	19.2	7.8	3.4	-	-	-	1.1	-	-	-	-	-		-	-	-	-	10.5
4 Dec 2016	Promocija plus	**31.3**	25.2	8.7	4.5	3.7	2.4	2.0	1.7	1.9	-	-	-	-		-	-	7.3	11.5	6.1
26 Nov 2016	2x1 komunikacije	**31.3**	19.1	7.8	3.6	0.8	0.7	-	1.1	-	-	-	-	-		-	-	-	-	12.2
25 Nov 2016	IPSOS PULS	**33.9**	24.2	10.8	7.5	1.4	1.4	1.4	2.3	2.5	-	-	-	-		-	-	8.4	6.4	9.7
6 Nov 2016	Promocija plus	**31.5**	25.3	10.1	4.3	3.1	2.2	2.1	1.6	2.0	-	-	-	-		-	-	6.0	11.7	6.2
5 Nov 2016	2x1 komunikacije	**27.6**	18.3	8.3	2.4	0.4	-	-	1.0	-	-	-	-	-		-	-	-	-	9.3
25 Oct 2016	IPSOS PULS	**35.3**	25.4	9.9	5.1	2.9	-	4.1	2.6	2.4	-	-	-	-		-	-	6.4	5.8	9.9
06 Oct 2016	Promocija plus	**30.6**	27.0	10.8	5.4	2.8	2.0	1.7	1.4	1.4	-	-	-	-		-	-	6.4	10.3	3.6
5 Oct 2016	2x1 komunikacije	**28.5**	19.7	10.2	1.4	1.3	-	-	1.4	-	-	-	-	-		-	-	-	-	8.8
26 Sep 2016	2x1 komunikacije	**27.8**	20.8	10.9	2.3	1.3	0.8	1.1	1.5	-	-	-	-	-		-	-	-	30.0	7.0
**11 Sep 2016**	**General Election**	**36.3**	**33.8**	**9.9**	**6.2**	*	*	**4.0**	**2.3**	**2.1**	*	*	*	*				**5.4**	-	**2.5**
