= Bloc for Croatia =

Croatian political party

Bloc for Croatia Blok za Hrvatsku
- President: Zlatko Hasanbegović
- Secretary: Domagoj Bešker
- Founded: 9 November 2019; 5 years ago
- Split from: Independents for Croatia
- Membership (2020): 32
- Ideology: Croatian nationalism Right-wing populism Social conservatism
- Political position: Right-wing
- National affiliation: DP-led coalition
- Sabor: 0 / 151
- European Parliament: 0 / 12
- Zagreb Assembly: 1 / 47

Website
- blokzahrvatsku.hr

The Bloc for Croatia (Croatian: Blok za Hrvatsku) is a right-wing nationalist political party in Croatia.

== History ==
After a disagreement between Zlatko Hasanbegović and the president of the Independents for Croatia party, Bruna Esih, over two separate electoral conventions, Hasanbegović left the party. In November 2019, he launched the Bloc for Croatia, stating that he was supported by four-fifths of the members of the Independents for Croatia. By December, the party entered an alliance with two other right-wing parties; Croatian Growth and the Croatian Conservative Party. However, after the formation of the nationalist party Miroslav Škoro Homeland Movement, Bloc for Croatia entered into an agreement with them.

== Presidents of the Bloc for Croatia ==
No.	President	Birth–Death	Term start	Term end
1	Zlatko Hasanbegović	1973–	9 November 2019	Incumbent

== Election results ==
=== Legislative ===
Election	Coalition	Votes won	Percentage	Seats won	Change	Government
Election	Coalition	(Coalition totals)		(BzH only)		Government
2020	DP–HS–HKS–HRAST–ZL–SU	181,492	10.89%	1 / 151	New	Opposition
2024	DP–PiP–ZL	202,714	9.56%	0 / 151	▼1	Extra-parliamentary
