= List of members of the Sabor, 2016–2020 =

The ninth Sabor was inaugurated on 14 October 2016. The assembly came into existence following the early parliamentary election on 11 September 2016 and consists of 151 representatives elected from 10 geographical and two special electoral districts.

On 18 May 2020, the 9th Sabor dissolved itself by a vote of 105 in favor.

== Parliamentary officials ==
The Speaker of the Croatian Parliament (or President) from 5 May 2017 was Gordan Jandroković who served before that as one of the vice presidents. From 14 October 2016 until his resignation on 5 May 2017 Božo Petrov, the president of the Bridge of Independent Lists (MOST) was the Speaker.

Vice presidents of Sabor were from government side Milijan Brkić and former Speaker Željko Reiner (all HDZ), from opposition side Milanka Opačić (SDP). Besides Jandroković, Ivan Vrdoljak (HNS) served also as vice president until 9 June 2017. The Italian national minority MP Furio Radin took over his position on 19 June 2017.

== Composition ==
On the basis of the early parliamentary election of 2016, the composition of the Sabor as of September 2016 is as follows. There has to be noted that national minority MPs can join other clubs as well beside the national minority group.

=== By parliamentary bloc ===
Party	October 2018
Croatian Democratic Union (HDZ)	55
Social Democratic Party of Croatia (SDP)	34
Bridge of Independent Lists (Most)	13
Labour and Solidarity Party (BM 365), Reformists (Reformisti) and Independent MPs	9
National minority club	8
Croatian Peasant Party (HSS)	5
Croatian People's Party – Liberal Democrats (HNS)	5
Civic Liberal Alliance (GLAS) and Croatian Party of Pensioners (HSU)	5
Croatian Christian Democratic Party (HDS), Croatian Social Liberal Party (HSLS) and Croatian Democratic Alliance of Slavonia and Baranja (HDSSB)	4
Human Blockade (Živi zid) and Power (SNAGA)	4
Istrian Democratic Assembly (IDS), Alliance of Primorje-Gorski Kotar (PGS) and List for Rijeka (LZR)	4
Independent Democratic Serb Party (SDSS)	3
Independents for Croatia (NHR)	3
Non-Inscrits	7
Total	151

=== By political party ===
Party	December 2018
Croatian Democratic Union (HDZ)	55
Social Democratic Party of Croatia (SDP)	31
Bridge of Independent Lists (Most)	10
Croatian Peasant Party (HSS)	5
Civic Liberal Alliance (GLAS)	4
Croatian People's Party – Liberal Democrats (HNS)	4
Human Blockade (Živi zid)	3
Independent Democratic Serb Party (SDSS)	3
Istrian Democratic Assembly (IDS)	3
Croatian Christian Democratic Party (HDS)	2
Independents for Croatia (NHR)	2
Labour and Solidarity Party (BM 365)	2
Democrats (Demokrati)	1
Croatian Democratic Alliance of Slavonia and Baranja (HDSSB)	1
Croatian Growth (HRAST)	1
Croatian Party of Pensioners (HSU)	1
Croatian Social Liberal Party (HSLS)	1
Independent Youth List (NLM)	1
Let's Change Croatia (PH)	1
People's Party - Reformists (Reformisti)	1
Power (SNAGA)	1
Independents	18
Total	151

=== MPs by party ===
Party	Name	Constituency/Deputizing
Croatian Democratic Union (55)	Ante Babić	District X, deputizing Andro Krstulović Opara since 19 June 2017
Croatian Democratic Union (55)	Ante Bačić	District X, deputizing Damir Krstičević since 19 June 2017 (deputized before from 19 October 2016 by Blaženko Boban)
Croatian Democratic Union (55)	Branko Bačić	District X
Croatian Democratic Union (55)	Marijana Balić	District V, deputizing Ivan Penava since 19 October 2016
Croatian Democratic Union (55)	Dražen Barišić	District VI
Croatian Democratic Union (55)	Vesna Bedeković	District IV, deputizing Tomislav Tolušić
Croatian Democratic Union (55)	Josip Borić	District VIII, deputizing Oleg Butković
Croatian Democratic Union (55)	Milijan Brkić	District II
Croatian Democratic Union (55)	Stevo Culej	District V
Croatian Democratic Union (55)	Mato Čičak	District VI, deputizing Goran Marić since 19 October 2016
Croatian Democratic Union (55)	Ivan Ćelić	District VII, deputizing Tomislav Ćorić since 19 October 2016
Croatian Democratic Union (55)	Pero Ćosić	District V
Croatian Democratic Union (55)	Josip Đakić	District IV
Croatian Democratic Union (55)	Damir Felak	District II, deputizing Ivana Maletić
Croatian Democratic Union (55)	Sunčana Glavak	District III, deputizing Darko Horvat since 25 May 2018, also deptutized by Nikolina Babić until 27 October 2016
Croatian Democratic Union (55)	Gordan Jandroković	District I
Croatian Democratic Union (55)	Marija Jelkovac	District VII, deputizing Tomo Medved
Croatian Democratic Union (55)	Željka Josić	District VI, deputizing Ivo Žinić
Croatian Democratic Union (55)	Branka Juričev-Martinčev	District IX
Croatian Democratic Union (55)	Mladen Karlić	District V
Croatian Democratic Union (55)	Ivan Kirin	District VIII
Croatian Democratic Union (55)	Tomislav Klarić	District VII
Croatian Democratic Union (55)	Anton Kliman	District VIII, deputized by Monika Udovičić until 27 October 2016
Croatian Democratic Union (55)	Vlatko Kopić	District IV
Croatian Democratic Union (55)	Miro Kovač	District IX, deputized by Martin Baričević until 27 October 2016
Croatian Democratic Union (55)	Josip Križanić	District III
Croatian Democratic Union (55)	Marijan Kustić	District IX, deputizing Darko Milinović since 25 May 2017
Croatian Democratic Union (55)	Tomislav Lipošćak	District VII, deputizing Damir Jelić since 8 December 2016
Croatian Democratic Union (55)	Davor Lončar	District IX
Croatian Democratic Union (55)	Franjo Lučić	District V
Croatian Democratic Union (55)	Ljubica Lukačić	District I, deputizing Andrej Plenković since 19 October 2016
Croatian Democratic Union (55)	Božo Ljubić	District XI (diaspora)
Croatian Democratic Union (55)	Ljubica Maksimčuk	District V, deputizing Zdravko Marić
Croatian Democratic Union (55)	Andrija Mikulić	District II
Croatian Democratic Union (55)	Domagoj Mikulić	District IV, deputizing Ivan Anušić since 9 June 2017
Croatian Democratic Union (55)	Davor Miličević	District V, deputizing Dražen Milinković since 20 October 2016
Croatian Democratic Union (55)	Domagoj Ivan Milošević	District VII
Croatian Democratic Union (55)	Grozdana Perić	District IX
Croatian Democratic Union (55)	Irena Petrijevčanin-Vuksanović	District IV
Croatian Democratic Union (55)	Sanja Putica	District X, deputizing Lovro Kuščević since 9 June 2017 (until then Mato Franković)
Croatian Democratic Union (55)	Željko Raguž	District XI (diaspora)
Croatian Democratic Union (55)	Željko Reiner	District I
Croatian Democratic Union (55)	Dragica Roščić	District X, deputizing Milan Kujundžić since 19 October 2016
Croatian Democratic Union (55)	Ante Sanader	District IX
Croatian Democratic Union (55)	Tomislav Sokol	District VI, deputizing Jasen Mesić since 22 September 2017
Croatian Democratic Union (55)	Davor Ivo Stier	District VII, deputized by Majda Burić from 19 October 2016 to 29 June 2017
Croatian Democratic Union (55)	Anđelko Stričak	District III
Croatian Democratic Union (55)	Stipo Šapina	District VI, deputizing Drago Prgomet since 8 December 2017
Croatian Democratic Union (55)	Marko Šimić	District V, deputizing Danijel Marušić
Croatian Democratic Union (55)	Ivan Šipić	District IX, deputizing Nediljko Dujić
Croatian Democratic Union (55)	Petar Škorić	District X
Croatian Democratic Union (55)	Ivan Šuker	District VI, deputizing Dražen Bošnjaković since 9 June 2017
Croatian Democratic Union (55)	Miro Totgergeli	District II
Croatian Democratic Union (55)	Miroslav Tuđman	District IV
Croatian Democratic Union (55)	Žarko Tušek	District III
Social Democratic Party of Croatia (34)	Marija Alfirev	District IX, deputizing Ivan Klarin since 13 November 2017
Social Democratic Party of Croatia (34)	Vedran Babić	District II
Social Democratic Party of Croatia (34)	Arsen Bauk	District X
Social Democratic Party of Croatia (34)	Davor Bernardić	District I
Social Democratic Party of Croatia (34)	Igor Dragovan	District I
Social Democratic Party of Croatia (34)	Saša Đujić	District VII
Social Democratic Party of Croatia (34)	Sabina Glasovac	District IX
Social Democratic Party of Croatia (34)	Bojan Glavašević	District VI
Social Democratic Party of Croatia (34)	Peđa Grbin	District VIII
Social Democratic Party of Croatia (34)	Branko Grčić	District X
Social Democratic Party of Croatia (34)	Mario Habek	District III
Social Democratic Party of Croatia (34)	Siniša Hajdaš Dončić	District III
Social Democratic Party of Croatia (34)	Domagoj Hajduković	District IV
Social Democratic Party of Croatia (34)	Romana Jerković	District VIII
Social Democratic Party of Croatia (34)	Željko Jovanović	District VIII
Social Democratic Party of Croatia (34)	Joško Klisović	District I
Social Democratic Party of Croatia (34)	Ana Komparić-Devčić	District VIII
Social Democratic Party of Croatia (34)	Stjepan Kovač	District III
Social Democratic Party of Croatia (34)	Boris Lalovac	District VI
Social Democratic Party of Croatia (34)	Marija Luc-Polanc	District V
Social Democratic Party of Croatia (34)	Gordan Maras	District II
Social Democratic Party of Croatia (34)	Damir Mateljan	District VII
Social Democratic Party of Croatia (34)	Predrag Matić	District V
Social Democratic Party of Croatia (34)	Orsat Miljenić	District I
Social Democratic Party of Croatia (34)	Milanka Opačić	District VII
Social Democratic Party of Croatia (34)	Ranko Ostojić	District IX
Social Democratic Party of Croatia (34)	Darko Parić	District X
Social Democratic Party of Croatia (34)	Alen Prelec	District I, deputizing Zoran Milanović since 10 March 2017
Social Democratic Party of Croatia (34)	Nenad Stazić	District VI
Social Democratic Party of Croatia (34)	Damir Tomić	District IV
Social Democratic Party of Croatia (34)	Siniša Varga	District I
Social Democratic Party of Croatia (34)	Marko Vešligaj	District III
Social Democratic Party of Croatia (34)	Franko Vidović	District IX
Social Democratic Party of Croatia (34)	Mihael Zmajlović	District VII
Bridge of Independent Lists (12)	Miro Bulj	District IX
Bridge of Independent Lists (12)	Sonja Čikotić	District IV, deputizing Miroslav Šimić since 11 April 2018
Bridge of Independent Lists (12)	Slaven Dobrović	District II, deputized by Ljubica Ambrušec until 10 May 2017
Bridge of Independent Lists (12)	Nikola Grmoja	District VI
Bridge of Independent Lists (12)	Ivana Ninčević-Lesandrić	District X
Bridge of Independent Lists (12)	Tomislav Panenić	District V
Bridge of Independent Lists (12)	Božo Petrov	District X
Bridge of Independent Lists (12)	Robert Podolnjak	District III
Bridge of Independent Lists (12)	Ante Pranić	District X, deputizing Ivan Kovačić since 6 December 2017, who was previously deputized by Maro Krstić (Most) from 19 October 2016 to 11 May 2017
Bridge of Independent Lists (12)	Hrvoje Runtić	District IV, elected from the Živi zid list but left the party before inauguration
Bridge of Independent Lists (12)	Marko Sladoljev	District VII, deputizing Josip Katalinić since 21 October 2016
Bridge of Independent Lists (12)	Ines Strenja	District VIII
Croatian Peasant Party (5)	Krešo Beljak	District VII
Croatian Peasant Party (5)	Željko Lenart	District VI
Croatian Peasant Party (5)	Mladen Madjer	District II, deputizing Stjepan Kožić
Croatian Peasant Party (5)	Ana-Marija Petin	District IV
Croatian Peasant Party (5)	Davor Vlaović	District V
Civic Liberal Alliance (4)	Goran Beus Richembergh	District VI, until 9 June 2017 HNS-LS
Civic Liberal Alliance (4)	Anka Mrak Taritaš	District II, until 9 June 2017 HNS-LS
Civic Liberal Alliance (4)	Vesna Pusić	District I, until 9 June 2017 HNS-LS
Civic Liberal Alliance (4)	Nada Turina-Đurić	District VII, until 9 June 2017 HNS-LS
Croatian People's Party – Liberal Democrats (4)	Milorad Batinić	District III
Croatian People's Party – Liberal Democrats (4)	Stjepan Čuraj	District IV, deputizing Ivan Vrdoljak since 9 June 2017
Croatian People's Party – Liberal Democrats (4)	Božica Makar	District III, deputizing Predrag Štromar
Croatian People's Party – Liberal Democrats (4)	Bernarda Topolko	District III, deputizing Matija Posavec
Human Shield (3)	Branimir Bunjac	District III, deputizing Vladimira Palfi
Human Shield (3)	Ivan Pernar	District VI
Human Shield (3)	Ivan Vilibor Sinčić	District VII
Independent Democratic Serb Party (3)	Dragana Jeckov	Special representative of the Serb minority, deputizing Mile Horvat since 30 June 2017
Independent Democratic Serb Party (3)	Boris Milošević	Special representative of the Serb minority
Independent Democratic Serb Party (3)	Milorad Pupovac	Special representative of the Serb minority
Istrian Democratic Assembly (3)	Tulio Demetlika	District VIII
Istrian Democratic Assembly (3)	Boris Miletić	District VIII
Istrian Democratic Assembly (3)	Giovanni Sponza	District VIII
Croatian Christian Democratic Party (2)	Branko Hrg	District II, elected from the HDZ list
Croatian Christian Democratic Party (2)	Goran Dodig	District X
Independents for Croatia (2)	Bruna Esih	District I, until 13 June 2017 HDZ club, since then NHR club
Independents for Croatia (2)	Zlatko Hasanbegović	District II, deputized by Sanda Kulić Makar until 27 October 2016, until 13 June 2017 HDZ, since then NHR club
Party of Labour and Solidarity (2)	Marija Puh	District III, left the HNS club on 19 October 2018 and joined the BM 365-Reformisti-NZ club
Party of Labour and Solidarity (2)	Kažimir Varda	District II, was elected as HSU member but left before inauguration, since 1 February SMSH, later BM 365, member of the BM 365-Reformisti-NZ club
Croatian Democratic Alliance of Slavonia and Baranja (1)	Branimir Glavaš	District IV, deputized by Josip Salapić from 2 November 2016 to 11 May 2017
Croatian Party of Pensioners (1)	Silvano Hrelja	District VIII
Croatian Social Liberal Party (1)	Darinko Kosor	District I
Croatian Growth (1)	Hrvoje Zekanović	District IX, was elected from the HDZ list, until 10 April 2018 member of the HDZ club
Let's Change Croatia (1)	Ivan Lovrinović	District II
People's Party - Reformists (1)	Darinko Dumbović	District VI
Power (1)	Goran Aleksić	District I, was elected from the Živi zid list
Independents (15)	Vladimir Bilek	Special representative of Czech and Slovak minorities, also member of the BM 365-Reformisti-NZ club
Independents (15)	Željko Glasnović	District XI (diaspora), since 13 June 2017 NHR club
Independents (15)	Róbert Jankovics	Special representative of the Hungarian minority, also member of the BM 365-Reformisti-NZ club since 1 November 2017
Independents (15)	Ermina Lekaj Prljaskaj	Special representative of the Albanian and four other minorities, also member of the BM 365-Reformisti-NZ club
Independents (15)	Veljko Kajtazi	Special representative of the Roma and eleven other minorities, also member of the HNS club until 12 June 2017 and the BM 365-Reformisti-NZ club since 1 November 2017
Independents (15)	Željko Lacković	District II, deputizing Milan Bandić, independent and left the BM 365 group
Independents (15)	Ivica Mišić	District V, left Let's Change Croatia, joined the BM 365-Reformisti-NZ club in 2018
Independents (15)	Mirando Mrsić	District VI, until 24 March 2018 member of the SPD club
Independents (15)	Vlaho Orepić	District I, deputized by Davor Romić from 19 October 2016 (until then Natko Felbar) to 10 May 2017, left the Most club on 14 December 2017
Independents (15)	Furio Radin	Special representative of the Italian minority, also member of the IDS-PGS-LZR club
Independents (15)	Zdravko Ronko	District V, left the SPD club on 19 September 2018 and joined the BM 365 group
Independents (15)	Tomislav Saucha	District VII, SDP until 17 March 2017, since 12 June 2017 HNS club
Independents (15)	Marin Škibola	District VIII, left Živi zid on 21 November 2016 and joined the PH club, which was dissolved in late 2017
Independents (15)	Marko Vučetić	District IX, until 9 July 2018 member of the Most club
Independents (15)	Tomislav Žagar	District IV, until 28 November 2016 member of the SDP club, joined later the Most club
