= Electoral district XI (Croatian Parliament) =

Electoral district in Croatia

Electoral district XI (Croatian: XI. izborna jedinica) is one of twelve electoral districts of the Croatian Parliament, returning seats for Croatians living outside of Croatia.

== Electorate ==
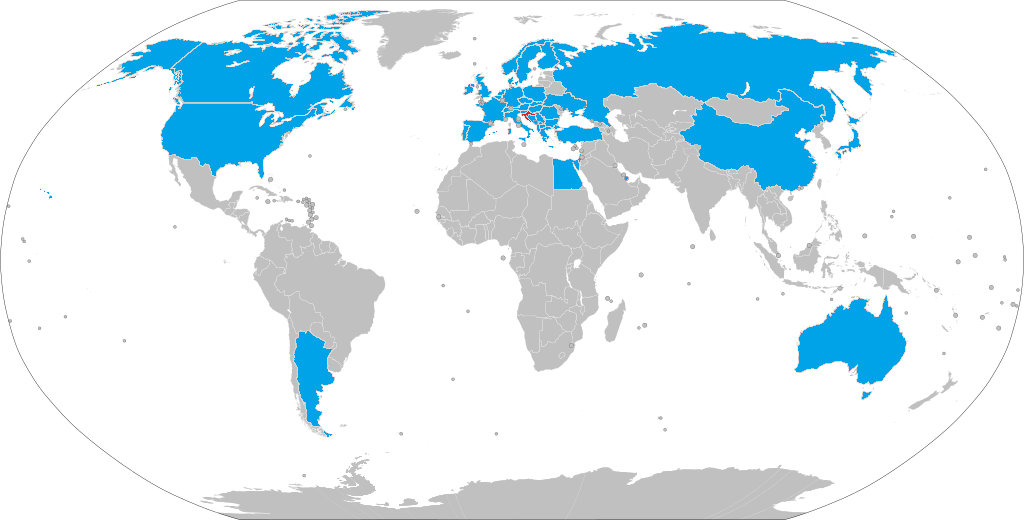
Map of 2020 Croatian parliamentary election diaspora

The former electoral system correlated the number of seats awarded in the district with the turnout of the election, both in the district and in Croatia as a whole. The total number of valid votes in the ten electoral districts of Croatia was divided by 140—the number of representatives elected in these districts—giving a quotient. The number of valid votes in district XI was divided by the quotient and then rounded to the nearest whole number, with 0.5 rounding up, giving the number of seats available in district XI.

Election	2000	2003	2007
Valid votes I-X	2,744,280	2,409,240	2,389,391
Quotient	19,816	17,209	17,067
Valid votes XI	125,655	69,727	89,653
Result	6.34	4.05	5.25
Seats	6	4	5

In 2010, the election law was amended, granting three seats, no matter the turnout.

Voting countries:

Country	2000	2003	2007	2011	2015	2016	2020	2024
Europe
Albania	10	3	0	0	1	4	4	1
Austria	1,460	1,097	835	218	613	422	395	379
Belgium	41	46	21	18	44	22	31	69
Bosnia and Herzegovina	109,187	55,642	81,509	16,714	18,351	14,836	21,579	33,328
Bulgaria	11	16	3	9	5	5	5	5
Czechia	18	12	6	7	19	11	14	23
Denmark	56	31	8	4	33	18	21	32
Finland	5	3	0	1	4	4	3	–
France	253	166	108	15	36	19	46	33
Germany	4,076	3,793	2,315	1,467	4,277	2,275	2,587	2,343
Greece	16	9	9	4	6	7	7	10
Hungary	48	20	20	14	29	31	28	29
Italy	245	70	66	62	84	69	66	84
Kosovo	part Serbia			14	8	10	12	17
Montenegro	part of Yugoslavia			228	227	137	124	265
Netherlands	42	25	14	11	32	41	32	52
North Macedonia	433	358	352	193	156	87	80	122
Norway	6	10	3	6	14	7	14	37
Poland	7	9	5	3	2	3	1	5
Portugal	0	0	0	0	2	2	8	7
Republic of Ireland	–	2	0	1	2	1	14	32
Romania	1,230	741	104	0	2	0	4	0
Russia	7	5	5	1	7	4	3	3
Serbia	483	1,456	x	541	520	327	416	1,102
Slovakia	0	0	0	3	0	2	2	1
Slovenia	245	154	92	40	60	54	67	110
Spain	17	21	5	2	3	2	7	8
Sweden	342	133	120	19	51	25	24	23
Switzerland	929	822	509	182	658	421	490	230
Turkey	4	2	1	0	2	4	1	1
Ukraine	0	1	0	0	0	0	2	–
United Kingdom	83	16	8	6	9	10	25	59

Country	2000	2003	2007	2011	2015	2016	2020	2024
Asia
Afghanistan	–			0	1	0	–	
China	0	0	1	1	0	0	0	2
India	0	0	1	0	1	1	–	–
Indonesia	1	2	1	1	4	4	–	1
Iran	3	0	0	0	x	0	–	–
Israel	11	15	14	11	11	4	1	–
Japan	0	0	0	0	0	2	6	–
Malaysia	1	0	3	0	x	x	–	–
Qatar	–				4	1	2	6
Syria	–			0	x	x	–	–
United Arab Emirates	–							12
Africa
Algeria	–			5	6	4	–	–
Egypt	3	1	2	1	0	0	3	2
Libya	–	1	1	–	x	x	–	–
Morocco	2	2	0	0	x	x	–	–
South Africa	115	19	8	3	31	34	–	17
South America
Argentina	149	271	185	92	172	130	37	94
Brazil	37	16	33	–	1	2	–	–
Chile	94	95	52	14	25	11	–	52
Peru	x	58	64	–	x	x	–	–
Venezuela	0	97	112	125	–			
North America
Canada	1,404	969	450	171	572	405	515	278
United States	1,154	396	254	70	275	149	128	97
Oceania
Australia	2,399	2,914	713	551	943	721	762	427
New Zealand	141	68	1	10	x	x	–	–

x – data incomplete

== Election ==
=== 2000 Elections ===
Party	Votes	%	Seats
HDZ	107.928	85.89	6
others	17.727	14.11	0
Total	125.655	100	6
Valid votes	125.655	99.06	
Invalid/blank votes	1.186	0.94	
Total votes	126.841	35.22	
Registered voters/turnout	360.110		
Source: Results Archived 15 December 2022 at the Wayback Machine

HDZ

- Milan Kovač
- Zdenka Babić-Petričević
- Ljubo Ćesić-Rojs
- Zdravka Bušić
- Ante Beljo
- Krunoslav Kordić

=== 2003 Elections ===
Party	Votes	%	Seats	+/-
HDZ	40.189	57.64	4	−2
HB – HIP	6.783	9.73	0	0
Independent Jerko Ivanković-Lijanović	6.670	9.57	0	0
Independent Ljubo Ćesić	4.913	7.05	0	0
others	11.172	16.01	0	0
Total	69.727	100	4	-2
Valid votes	69.727	98.87		
Invalid/blank votes	800	1.13		
Total votes	70.527	17.78		
Registered voters/turnout	396.617			
Source: Results Archived 15 December 2022 at the Wayback Machine

HDZ

- Zdenka Nediljka Babić Petričević
- Florijan Boras
- Krešimir Ćosić
- Ivan Bagarić

=== 2007 Elections ===
Party	Votes	%	Seats	+/-
HDZ	73.446	81.92	5	+1
Independent Jerko Ivanković-Lijanović	9.024	10.07	0	0
others	7.183	8.01	0	0
Total	89.653	100	5	+1
Valid votes	89.653	99.17		
Invalid/blank votes	749	0.83		
Total votes	90.402	22.32		
Registered voters/turnout	404.950			
Source: Results Archived 15 December 2022 at the Wayback Machine

HDZ

- Dragan Primorac
- Ivo Andrić
- Ivan Bagarić
- Dragan Vukić
- Rade Bošnjak

=== 2011 Elections ===
Party	Votes	%	Seats	+/-
HDZ	15.016	71.98	3	−2
HSP	2.105	10.09	0	0
others	3.740	17.93	0	0
Total	20.861	100	3	-2
Valid votes	20.861	98.87		
Invalid/blank votes	239	1.13		
Total votes	21.100	5.12		
Registered voters/turnout	411.758			
Source: Results

HDZ

- Ilija Filipović
- Milijan Brkić
- Perica Jelečević

=== 2015 Elections ===
Party	Votes	%	Seats	+/-
HDZ – HSS – HSP AS – BUZ – HSLS – HRAST – HDS – ZDS	24.444	85.69	3	0
others	4.081	14.31	0	0
Total	28.525	100	3	0
Valid votes	28.525	98.64		
Invalid/blank votes	392	1.36		
Total votes	28.917	99.91		
Registered voters/turnout	28.944			
Source: Results Archived 15 December 2022 at the Wayback Machine

HDZ

- Željko Glasnović
- Božo Ljubić
- Ivan Šuker

=== 2016 Elections ===
Party	Votes	%	Seats	+/-
HDZ	13.117	62.72	2	−1
Independent Željko Glasnović	5.211	24.91	1	+1
others	2.585	12.37	0	0
Total	20.913	100	3	0
Valid votes	20.913	98.61		
Invalid/blank votes	295	1.39		
Total votes	21.208	99.93		
Registered voters/turnout	21.223			
Source: Results Archived 15 December 2022 at the Wayback Machine

HDZ

- Božo Ljubić
- Željko Raguž

Independent Željko Glasnović

- Željko Glasnović

=== 2020 Elections ===
Party	Votes	%	Seats	+/-
HDZ	17.905	63.02	3	+1
Independent Željko Glasnović	5.958	20.97	0	−1
Most	3.141	11.05	0	0
others	1.407	4.96	0	0
Total	28.410	100	3	0
Valid votes	28.410	98.76		
Invalid/blank votes	358	1.25		
Total votes	28.768	99.92		
Registered voters/turnout	28.790			
Source: Results Archived 3 March 2024 at the Wayback Machine

HDZ

- Nevenko Barbarić
- Radoje Vidović
- Zdravka Bušić

=== 2024 Elections ===
Party	Votes	%	Seats	+/-
HDZ	32.108	79.45	3	0
Most	2.684	6.64	0	0
HB	2.469	6.10	0	0
others	3.151	7.81	0	0
Total	40.412	100	3	0
Valid votes	40.412	98.31		
Invalid/blank votes	695	1.69		
Total votes	41.107	99.97		
Registered voters/turnout	41.120			
Source: Results Archived 3 March 2024 at the Wayback Machine

HDZ

- Zvonko Milas
- Dario Pušić
- Radoje Vidović
