= Zlatko Hasanbegović =

Croatian politician and historian

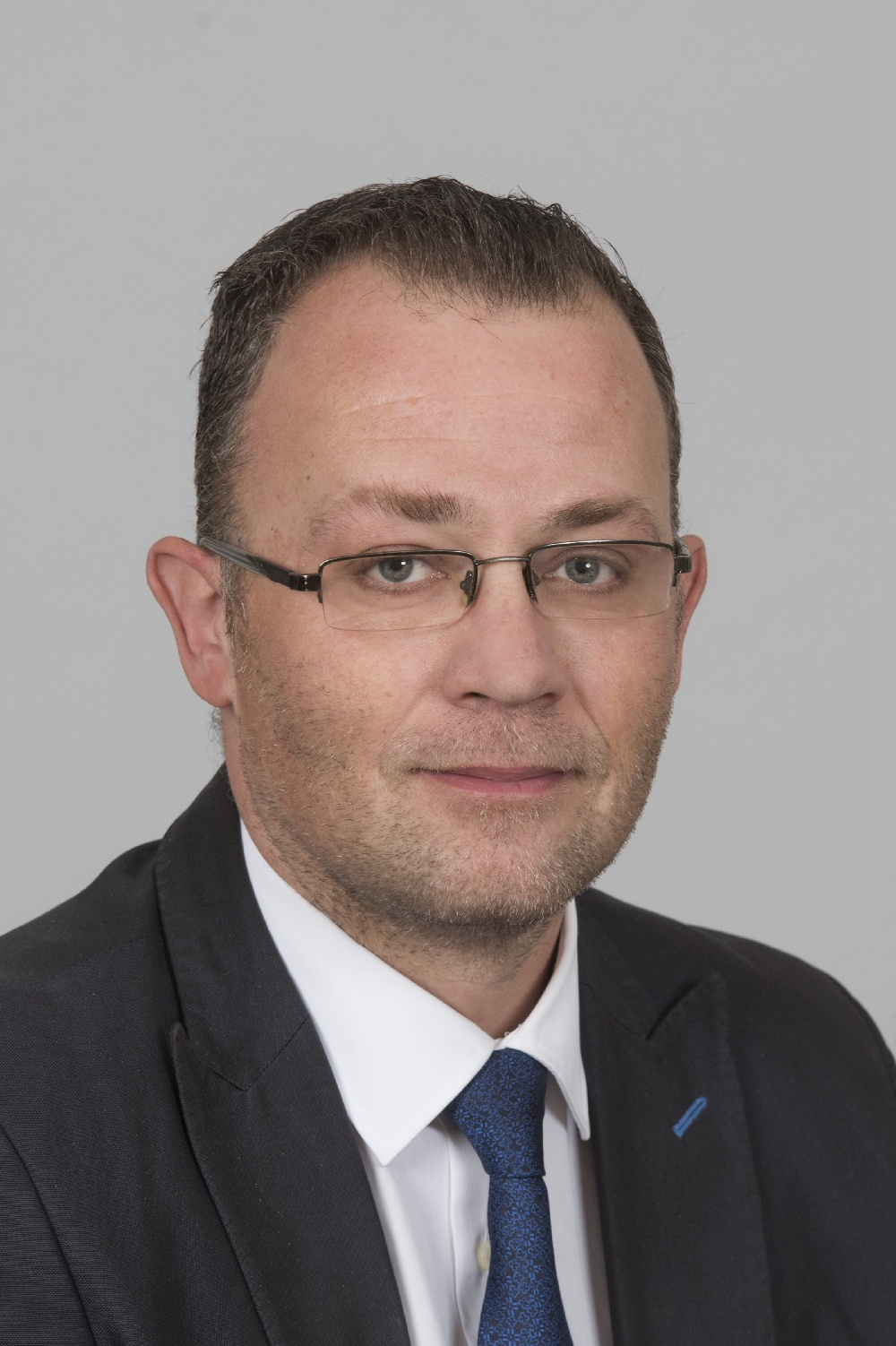

Member of the Croatian Parliament
- In office 14 October 2016 – 16 May 2024
- President: Kolinda Grabar-Kitarović; Zoran Milanović
- Prime Minister: Tihomir Orešković; Andrej Plenković
- Constituency: I electoral district

Member of the Zagreb Assembly
- Incumbent
- Assumed office 10 July 2017
- Mayor: Milan Bandić; Jelena Pavičić Vukičević (Acting); Tomislav Tomašević

Minister of Culture
- In office 22 January 2016 – 19 October 2016
- President: Kolinda Grabar-Kitarović
- Prime Minister: Tihomir Orešković
- Preceded by: Berislav Šipuš
- Succeeded by: Nina Obuljen Koržinek

Personal details
- Born: 14 June 1973 (age 53) Zagreb, SR Croatia, SFR Yugoslavia (modern Croatia)
- Party: Bloc for Croatia (2019–present)
- Other political affiliations: Croatian Pure Party of Rights (1996–1997); Croatian Democratic Union (2015–2017); Independents for Croatia (2017–2019)
- Spouse: Lamija Hasanbegović
- Children: 2
- Parents: Ibrahim Hasanbegović; Zumreta Prohić
- Education: University of Zagreb
- Profession: Historian, politician, activist

Zlatko Hasanbegović (Croatian pronunciation: [zlâtko xǎsanbeːɡoʋit͜ɕ]; born 14 June 1973) is a Croatian politician and historian who has served as a member of the Croatian Parliament since 2016. He served as Minister of Culture in the cabinet of Tihomir Orešković from 22 January to 19 October 2016. Hasanbegović is also a member of the Zagreb Assembly and one of the founders of the Independents for Croatia party.

As a historian, Hasanbegović's interests are relations between the modern Croatian ideologies, especially pravaštvo (Croatian nationalist ideology) and its relations towards Islam in Croatia and in Bosnia and Herzegovina in the 19th and 20th centuries. He researches Muslim elements of the Croatian bourgeois culture until 1945 and relations of political parties as well as religious and national relations in Bosnia and Herzegovina since the Austro-Hungarian occupation until the communist takeover.

Hasanbegovic's scholarship has been described by international scholars and journalists as "an apologetic" for Croatian fascists and the crimes of the Ustasa. The Foreign Policy journal has referred to Hasanbegovic as an outright fascist, and in 2016, it was widely reported in the Croatian and international media that Hasanbegovic had published several articles in the 90's celebrating the regime of the Croatian fascists in WWII, calling them "heroes" and "patriots." One magazine printed a photograph of Hasanbegovic posing while wearing a cap similar to those worn by the Ustasha, a paramilitary organization similar to the SS, responsible for the mass deportation and murder of thousands of Jews, Serbs, Roma and Croatian Muslims and Catholics who opposed the regime. The Simon Wiesenthal Centre, a human rights organization, was outraged by Hasanbegovic's appointment and called for his immediate removal.

He was an associate of the Institute of Humanities Ivo Pilar.

From 2019, he is the president of the Bloc for Croatia political party.

== Early life and education ==
Zlatko Hasanbegović was born on 14 June 1973 in Zagreb to ethnic Bosniak parents Zumreta Hasanbegović (née Prohić) from Gračanica and Ibrahim Hasanbegović from Bosanska Gradiška. His mother's side of the family moved from Gračanica (modern-day Bosnia and Herzegovina) to the Croatian capital of Zagreb in 1941. His maternal grandfather, Sabrija Prohić, was a rich industrialist with properties across the former Kingdom of Yugoslavia. During World War II, the Prohić family helped hide a Jewish girl from Gračanica in their house in Zagreb. Hasanbegović's grandparents Sabrija and Safeta Prohić, along with his aunt and uncle Esma and Avdo Prohić, were posthumously named Righteous Among the Nations by Israel in 2018. Hasanbegović was forbidden from attending the award ceremony.

After the war, they were accused of smuggling foreign currency and arrested by the Communist authorities. Sabrija Prohić tried to escape to Argentina, but was caught and later killed as a class enemy, while their entire property was confiscated.

Hasanbegović finished elementary and high school in Zagreb, after which he enrolled in Zagreb Faculty of Humanities and Social Sciences where he graduated in history. He gained his doctorate at the same Faculty in 2009 in the field of history under the supervision of Ivo Goldstein.

== Career ==
Hasanbegović is working as a research associate at the Ivo Pilar Institute of Social Sciences. He is the editor of Pilar journal, member of executive committee of the Majlis of Zagreb's Muslim community,

He is president of the Supervisory Board of the Honorary Bleiburg Platoon, an organisation which is the main organizer of the Bleiburg commemoration, and associate of various initiatives for the determination of victims of communism. The subject of his interest is the relation of modern Croatian nationalist ideology, in particular the Party of Rights and its present-day offshoots, Islam in Croatia and Islam in Bosnia and Herzegovina during the 19th and 20th centuries. Hasanbegović researched the Muslim component of Croatian bourgeois culture until 1945 and the political and ethno-religious relations in Bosnia and Herzegovina since the 1878 Austro-Hungarian rule until the communist takeover in the 1940s.

Hasanbegović has published Croatian translations of several essays: Against Democracy and Equality: The European New Right by Tomislav Sunić, The Holocaust Industry by Norman Finkelstein, Intellectual Terrorism by Jure Vujić, Communism and Nazism by Alain de Benoist, and Wahhabism: A Critical Essay by Hamid Algar.

He entered politics in his youth when he was a member of the Croatian Pure Party of Rights (HČSP). In 2015 he joined the Croatian Democratic Union (HDZ). On 8 May 2015 during the Otvoreno show on Croatian Radiotelevision Hasanbegović stated that anti-fascism is not in the foundations of the Constitution of Croatia; "Croatian War of Independence is the only war in the 20th century from which Croats came out as true winners and the only basis on which Croatia should be built. Ghosts and goblins of the past will cause a permanent rift and endless debate. Anti-fascism is not the foundation of Croatia, but a platitude that has no basis in the constitutional text, not being mentioned anywhere."

Deputy Speaker of the Parliament and professor of constitutional law Robert Podolnjak from the governing Bridge of Independent Lists party, among many others, posited that anti-fascism is in the foundations of the Constitution of Croatia.

Hasanbegović said that his remarks about anti-fascism were related to the Yugoslav totalitarian legacy and Titoism: "All who abuse the notion of anti-fascism, which can be fluid, as is well-known to historians, know that various meanings can be attributed to that notion. Stalin, Tito, Pol Pot and also U.S. General Patton were anti-fascists. Everyone knows that those were different persons. We are not talking about abstract anti-fascism but about the particular Yugoslav Communist totalitarian legacy."

His political positions have been described in media as right wing or far-right.

=== Minister of Culture ===
On 22 January 2016, Hasanbegović was appointed as Minister of Culture by Prime Minister Tihomir Orešković. A part of the cultural workers expressed their dissatisfaction mainly due to his comments about anti-fascism and his lack of experience in management of culture. Civic initiative Platform 112, which brings together 70 NGOs, held a protest in front of the Parliament on the day when the new Government was approved, urging MPs to vote against the cabinet of Tihomir Orešković because of Hasanbegović. The Croatian Journalists' Association issued a statement in which they strongly opposed the nomination of Hasanbegović as Minister of Culture.

The Israel-based Simon Wiesenthal Center urged the Government of Croatia to dismiss Hasanbegović, saying he took a disdainful attitude towards Croatian resistance to fascism during World War II. The Croatian Helsinki Committee (HHO) and the Initiative EU 1481 of Matica hrvatska dismissed the accusations against Hasanbegović as unfounded. Hasanbegović stated that the protests against him were not supported by any facts but based on a selective use of his different statements. During this period, a video from 2012 appeared in which he openly refers to the ousting of the Nazi Independent State of Croatia (NDH) as the "biggest national tragedy and defeat" for Croatia. Hasanbegović said about the video that he would not apologize for his words.

As one of his first moves as minister, Hasanbegović announced that there is no need for the continuation of Government funding of any non-profit media. The International and European Federations of Journalists joined their affiliates in Croatia, the HND and the Trade Union of Croatian Journalists (Sinoh) in condemning this decision, as well as the Hasanbegović's dissolution of the Expert Committee for non-profit media before the end of its mandate.

Under the new budget for 2016, the Government of Croatia stopped funding certain cultural projects and non-profit media, which Hasanbegović described as "racket money", adding that tax-payers' money will no longer be distributed in a non-transparent way for neither the left-wing nor right-wing media.

In May, he signed a cooperation deal with Hungary's Minister Zoltán Balog. At the 17th electoral convention of the HDZ, Hasanbegović was elected to the HDZ Presidency and received most votes.

After Croatian Parliament supported motion of no confidence against Prime Minister Orešković, his whole Cabinet resigned while the Parliament dismissed itself which led to new election. On 2016 parliamentary election, Hasanbegović was elected to the Parliament as HDZ's candidate. In the aftermath, newly elected president of HDZ, Andrej Plenković, formed a new government with new Minister of Culture being Nina Obuljen Koržinek and not Hasanbegović for which he expressed his dissatisfaction.

=== Later political career ===
In May 2017, Hasanbegović decided to participate in the Zagreb local elections on the independent list of Bruna Esih, who ran against the official HDZ candidate. Hasanbegović also criticized the HDZ leader Andrej Plenković, saying that his path "is wrong and leads to moral quagmire". The HDZ soon announced that Hasanbegović was evicted from the party. The independent list won 8.23% of the vote in the local election and Hasanbegović became a member of the Zagreb Assembly. Following the elections, Hasanbegović and Esih formed a new political party, the Independents for Croatia. The new party formed a majority in the assembly with the incumbent Mayor Milan Bandić, provided the name of Zagreb's Marshal Tito Square was changed to Republic of Croatia Square.

In 2019, following a split with Esih, he became the president of the newly founded Bloc for Croatia political party.

=== Controversy ===
In 1996, Hasanbegović wrote at least two articles in the magazine Nezavisna Država Hrvatska, named after the fascist Independent State of Croatia (NDH), in which he glorified the Ustashas as heroes and martyrs. The magazine was edited by the far-right Croatian Liberation Movement (HOP) and Hasanbegović was described as a young HOP member in it. Commenting on his texts from 1996 twenty years later, Hasanbegović said that the crimes of the Ustashas were "the biggest moral lapse" of the Croatian people in their history, adding: "Using totally peripheral statements I made as a student more than 20 years ago and taking them out of context is nothing but political manipulation". He also denied that he was ever a member of the Croatian Liberation Movement.

In 1993, Hasanbegović posed for a photo in Split at an event of the 9th Battalion of the Croatian Defence Forces (HOS), the Croatian Party of Rights' paramilitary (1991–92), wearing a cap with what is allegedly an Ustasha Militia badge. The photograph's resurfacing in 2016 and its circulation in the Croatian media caused major backlash. Hasanbegović denied he was wearing an Ustasha cap, claiming the photo had been manipulated and that he wore a black cap of the HOS. A similar or identical cap, with an Ustasha badge, was worn by some members of the 9th HOS Battalion during their gatherings in the 1990s.

In 1998, he took part in demonstrations organized by pro-fascist groups against the renaming of Zagreb's Croatian Nobles Square back to the Square of the Victims of Fascism. Hasanbegović commented that he was not connected to the organizers of the protests, and that he joined every protest in Zagreb in the 1990s.

== Publications ==
- Muslims in Zagreb, 1878-1945. The Era of the Foundation; Majlis of the Islamic Community Zagreb - Institute of Social Sciences "Ivo Pilar", Zagreb, 2007.
- Yugoslav Muslim Organisation 1929-1941 (In War and Revolution 1941-1945); Bosniac National Community - Institute of Social Sciences "Ivo Pilar" – Majlis of the Islamic Community Zagreb, Zagreb, 2012.
