= Green–Left Coalition =

Political coalition in Croatia

Green–Left Coalition Zeleno–lijeva koalicija
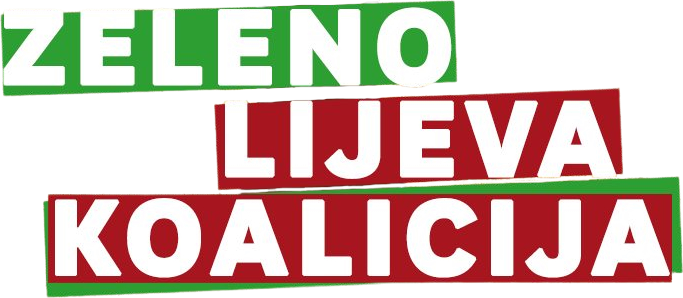
- Leader: Collective leadership
- Founded: 2017 (as the Left Bloc)
- Dissolved: Before 2024
- Succeeded by: We Can! (partly)
- Ideology: Eco-socialism; Democratic socialism Progressivism; Green politics
- Political position: Centre-left to left-wing
- European affiliation: European Greens, European Left (until 2020)
- Colours: Red Green
- Croatian Parliament (in 2020): 7 / 151
- European Parliament (in 2021): 0 / 12
- Zagreb Assembly (in 2021): 23 / 47

The Green–Left Coalition (Croatian: Zeleno–lijeva koalicija) was a left-wing electoral alliance in Croatia represented by six MPs. It is presently composed of the We Can! – Political Platform and New Left, as well some localist political parties and platforms, such as Zagreb is OURS! and For the City (Croatian: Za grad) movements from City of Zagreb and Srđ is the City! (Croatian: Srđ je grad!) from Dubrovnik. It promotes democratic socialism, green politics, and progressivism on social issues.

== History ==
The coalition was formed in 2017 for the Zagreb local elections as the Left Bloc (Croatian: Lijevi blok), where it won 4 out of 51 seats in the Zagreb local Assembly, and profiling itself as the most vocal opposition to mayor Milan Bandić and his local majority coalition with right-wing political subjects.

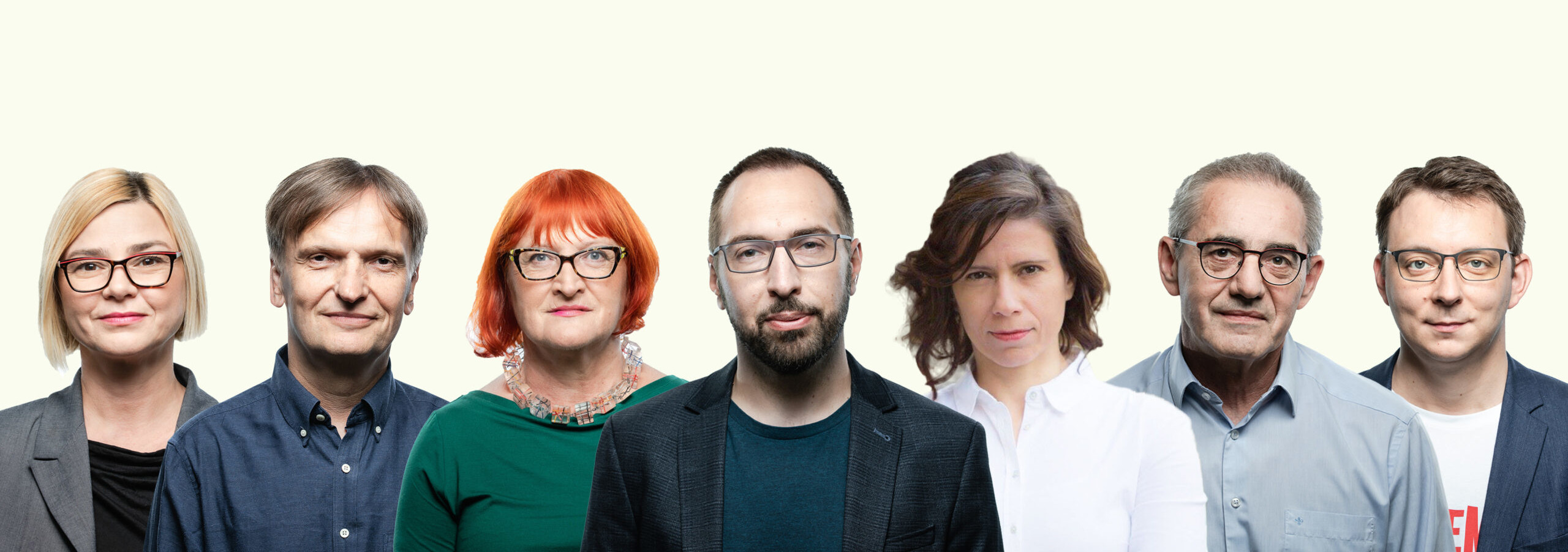
All seven MPs of the Green-Left Coalition, elected at the 2020 Croatian parliamentary election.

For the 2019 European Parliament election and upcoming July 2020 national parliamentary election in Croatia, members of the political alliance continue to collaborate. For the 2020 parliamentary election, the coalition changed its name into the current one. In the upcoming elections the coalition began rising in the polls from the start of campaign and receiving media coverage on daily basis. In June 2020 independent MP Bojan Glavašević joined the We Can! – Political Platform and the coalition parliamentary election list.

Front-man of the punk-rock band Hladno pivo, Mile Kekin, and his wife Ivana (clinical psychologist) also joined the party list as socialists who were concerned with a lack of social policies in the established center-left SDP. Kekin also authored the song that was used for the coalition promotions titled "Happy People". Prominent theater maker and performer Mario Kovač also joined as the lead candidate of the list for diaspora (again through a performance action). The coalition's participation in the elections was also supported by a number of public figures, including musicians Damir Urban, Ljiljana Nikolovska and Davor Tolja, journalists Vedrana Rudan, Tomislav Jakić and Viktor Ivančić, multimedia artist Slaven Tolj, as well Bosnian conceptual artist and left-wing activist Damir Nikšić. To add to this, in the last week towards the elections new public figures used video to express support like actor and activist Jane Fonda or voting commitments from numerous individuals. The coalition also received support from the Democratic Socialists of America, the Party of the European Left, GUE/NGL and the European Greens, as well as political organizations from neighboring countries, such as The Left from Slovenia, United Reform Action from Montenegro, Social Democratic Union and Do not let Belgrade d(r)own from Serbia. The Coalition came fifth in the election, winning around 7% of the votes, and being granted 7 parliamentary seats in the 151-seat Croatian Parliament. They celebrated their results at the MSU in Zagreb. In December 2020 Tomislav Tomašević announced that Workers' Front is no longer member of coalition due to a conflict with other parties.

In 17 March 2023, the Green-Left Bloc parliamentary group changed its name to We Can! parliamentary group, which was presented as one of the steps towards the planned future merger of the current member parties of the coalition into the We Can! party. As of 2024, the merger is ongoing and in the 2024 national parliamentary election the coalition is running under the We Can! name with them also being the only party officially on the ballot. The leader of New Left Ivana Kekin is cited as a We Can! member on the party website. The process is expected to be completed by 2025.

Independent MP Bojan Glavašević left the parliamentary club in March 2024, on good terms, as he is running on the Rivers of Justice coalition list in the parliamentary election.

The We Can! party is cooperating with a Dubrovnik localist party Srđ is a City! from 2019. The parties are running on a joint list for the 2024 parliamentary election in the 10th electoral district.

== Composition ==
Member party	Main ideology	Position	Croatian Parliament (2020–2021)	European Parliament (2020–2021)	Zagreb City Assembly (2020–2021)	Member until
We Can! (Note: Including affiliated independent MPs); Zagreb is OURS!	Social progressivism Green municipalism	Left-wing	5 / 151	0 / 12	19 / 47	2024 (Note: Run independently at the 2024 elections)
New Left	Social democracy Democratic socialism	Centre-left to left-wing	1 / 151	0 / 12	3 / 47	2024 (Note: Merged into the We Can! in 2024)
Workers' Front	Democratic socialism Social progressivism	Left-wing	1 / 151	0 / 12	0 / 47	2020
Green Alternative	Green politics Social progressivism	Centre-left to left-wing	0 / 151	0 / 12	1 / 47	2023

== Electoral performance ==
=== Parliament of Croatia ===
Year	Popular vote	% of popular vote	Overall seats won	Seat change	Government
2020	116,480	6.99%	7 / 151	▲7	Opposition

=== Zagreb City Assembly ===
Year	Popular vote	% of popular vote	Overall seats won	Seat change	Government
2017	24,706	7.64%	4 / 51	▲4	Opposition
2021	130,850	40.83%	23 / 47	▲19	Government

=== European Parliament ===
Year	Popular votes	% of popular votes	Overall seats won	Seat change	Affiliation
2019	21,975	2.03%	0 / 12	—	EGP-GUE
