= Dalija Orešković and People with a First and Last Name =

Dalija Orešković and People with a First and Last Name Dalija Orešković i ljudi s imenom i prezimenom
- Abbreviation: DOSIP
- President: Dalija Orešković
- Founded: 28 December 2018 (START); 4 May 2020 (IP); 8 October 2023 (DOSIP)
- Dissolved: 16 November 2020 (IP)
- Split from: Centre (2023)
- Merged into: Centre (2020)
- Headquarters: Dankovečka 6, Zagreb
- Ideology: Liberalism; Anti-corruption; Reformism
- Political position: Centre to centre-left
- National affiliation: Rivers of Justice (2024)
- Colours: Magenta; Blue; Light blue (formerly)
- Sabor: 1 / 151
- European Parliament: 0 / 12

Website
- dosip.hr

Dalija Orešković and People with a First and Last Name (Croatian: Dalija Orešković i ljudi s imenom i prezimenom, abbr. DOSIP) is a liberal political party in Croatia founded by Dalija Orešković.

== History ==
START party logo

Party with a First and Last Name logo

In October 2018, Dalija Orešković announced she would enter politics on the centre-left spectrum. On December 29, 2018 she announced her party will be called START, standing for "Party of Anti-corruption, Development and Transparency". She ran for president in 2019, obtaining 55,163 or 2.9% of the votes, coming in 6th out of 11 candidates, and being eliminated in the first round.

On 4 May 2020, the START changed its name to Party with a First and Last Name (IP, also SIP, STRIP or SsIP), and Orešković stepped down from the position of party president. Ivan Kovačić was elected as the new leader of the party. In the parliamentary elections held on 5 July 2020, she was elected for member of Croatian Parliament.

On 16 November 2020, the party merged with the Pametno to form a single party, called Centre. Orešković however left Centre in August 2023, due to the dispute with the Puljak couple. The Party Dalija Orešković and People with a First and Last Name DOSIP) was formed on 8 October 2023, as a continuation of Party with a First and Last Name.

== Election results ==
=== Presidential ===
Election year(s)	Candidate	1st round		2nd round		Result
Election year(s)	Candidate	Votes	%	Votes	%	Result
2024-25	end. Zoran Milanović (Ind.)	797,938	49.68 (#1)	1,122,859	74.68 (#1)	Won

=== Legislative ===
Election	Coalition	Votes	%	Seats	+/–	Government
Election	Coalition	Coalition totals		DOSIP only		Government
2020	Fokus–Pametno	66,399	3.98 (6th)	1 / 151	New	Opposition
2024	Rivers of Justice	538,748	25.40 (2nd)	1 / 151	0	Opposition

=== European Parliament ===
Election	List leader	Coalition	Votes	%	Seats	+/–	EP Group
Election	List leader	Coalition	Coalition		DOSIP		EP Group
2024	Biljana Borzan	Rivers of Justice	192,859	25.62 (#2)	0 / 12	New	–
