= Dalija Orešković =

Croatian lawyer and politician (b. 1977)

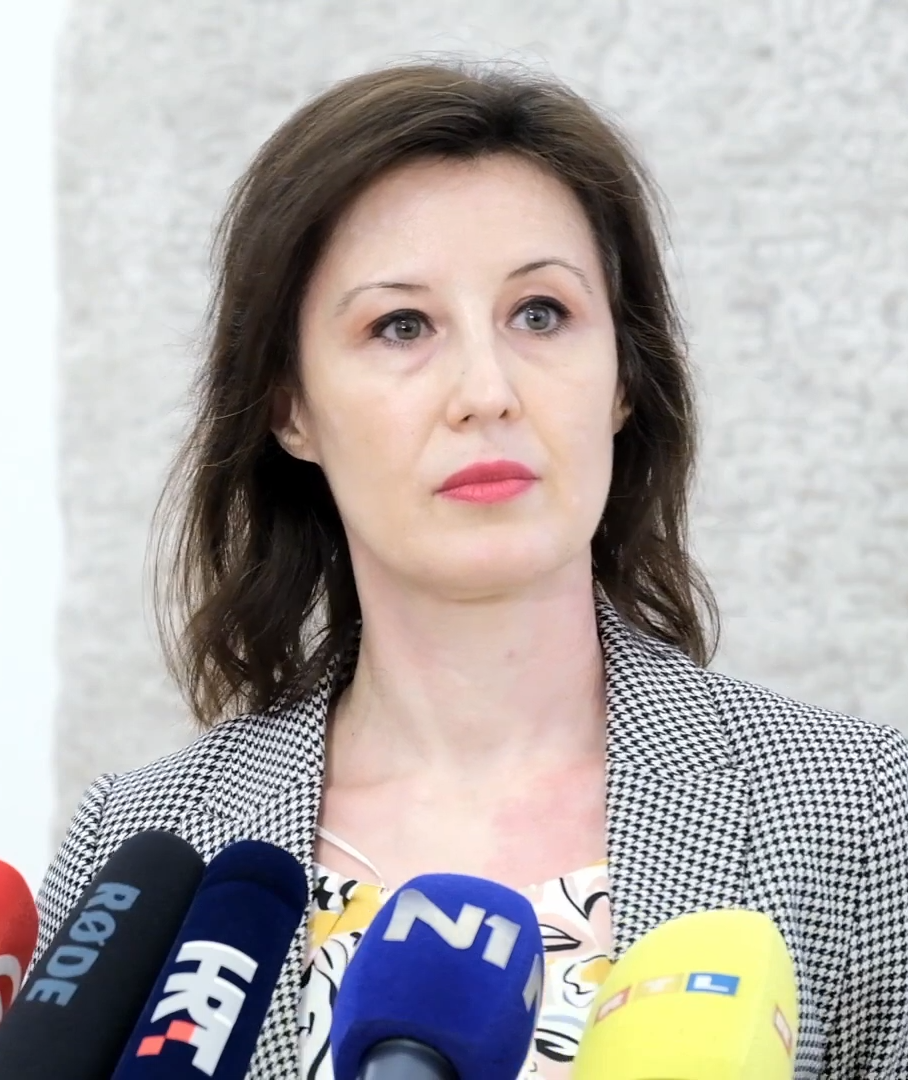
- Orešković in 2024

Member of the Croatian Parliament
- Incumbent
- Assumed office 22 July 2020
- Constituency: Electoral district I

President of the Conflict of Interest Commission
- In office 11 February 2013 – 11 February 2018
- Preceded by: Mate Kačan
- Succeeded by: Nataša Novaković

Personal details
- Born: 18 June 1977 (age 49) Zagreb, SR Croatia, Yugoslavia
- Party: DOSIP (2019–2020, 2023–)
- Other political affiliations: Centre (2020–2023)
- Spouse: Frane Letica (m. 2009; div. 2020)
- Children: 2
- Education: University of Zagreb (LL.B., LL.M.)

Dalija Orešković (born 18 June 1977) is a Croatian lawyer and politician. She has been serving as a member of the Croatian Parliament since 2020. From 2013 to 2018, she held the position of president of the Conflict of Interest Commission.

Orešković is the founder and leader of the centre-left political party Dalija Orešković and People with a First and Last Name (DOSIP), established in 2023 as a continuation of the Party with a First and Last Name, originally founded as START in 2018. Between November 2020 and November 2021, she served as co-president of the political party Centre.

== Early life and professional career ==
Orešković was born in Zagreb on 18 June 1977. She completed her primary and secondary education in the city before graduating from the Faculty of Law at the University of Zagreb in 2000. She later obtained a master's degree in European Law and passed the bar examination in September 2003.

She began her legal career in 2001, working in the law offices of Davor Begić, and later at the firms of Damir Šebetić and Mikulčić–Lončarić–Bahun–Topić. In 2009, together with her husband Frano Letica, she opened a joint law office, where she worked until 2013.

From 2013 to 2018, Orešković served as president of the Conflict of Interest Commission, having been elected to the post by the Croatian Parliament from among 199 applicants. During her tenure, she initiated proceedings against a number of prominent political figures, including President Kolinda Grabar-Kitarović, Deputy Prime Minister Tomislav Karamarko, Zagreb Mayor Milan Bandić, and Split Mayor Željko Kerum. In February 2018, Orešković sought re-election to the post. In the first round of voting in the Parliament, the ruling Croatian Democratic Union (HDZ) supported her opponent Nataša Novaković. Following her weaker result in the initial round, Orešković withdrew from the contest, after which Novaković was elected as her successor.

== Political career ==
In October 2018, Orešković announced her entry into politics as part of the centre-left spectrum. On 29 December 2018, she presented the establishment of a new political party, START (an acronym for Party of Anti-corruption, Development and Transparency). She ran as a candidate in the 2019 presidential election, receiving 55,163 votes (2.9 percent) and finishing sixth out of eleven candidates, thus failing to advance to the second round.

In May 2020, START changed its name to the Party with a First and Last Name (IP). In the 2020 parliamentary election she was elected as a member of the Croatian Parliament. Later that year, in November 2020, the party merged with Pametno, forming a new liberal political party named Centre, with Orešković serving as one of its co-presidents alongside Marijana Puljak.

In 2023, Orešković left Centre and re-established her own party under the name Dalija Orešković and People with a First and Last Name (DOSIP). She contested the 2024 parliamentary election as part of the Rivers of Justice coalition, and was reelected to the Parliament.

== Personal life ==
Orešković's family originates from the Lika region. She is a descendant of Marko Orešković, a Croatian Partisan commander and recipient of the title People's Hero of Yugoslavia, who was killed by Chetnik forces in 1941.

She was married to Frane Letica, the son of Croatian author and politician Slaven Letica, from 2009 to 2020. The couple has two daughters.
