= Željko Glasnović =

Croatian politician and general (1954- )

Major general Željko Glasnović
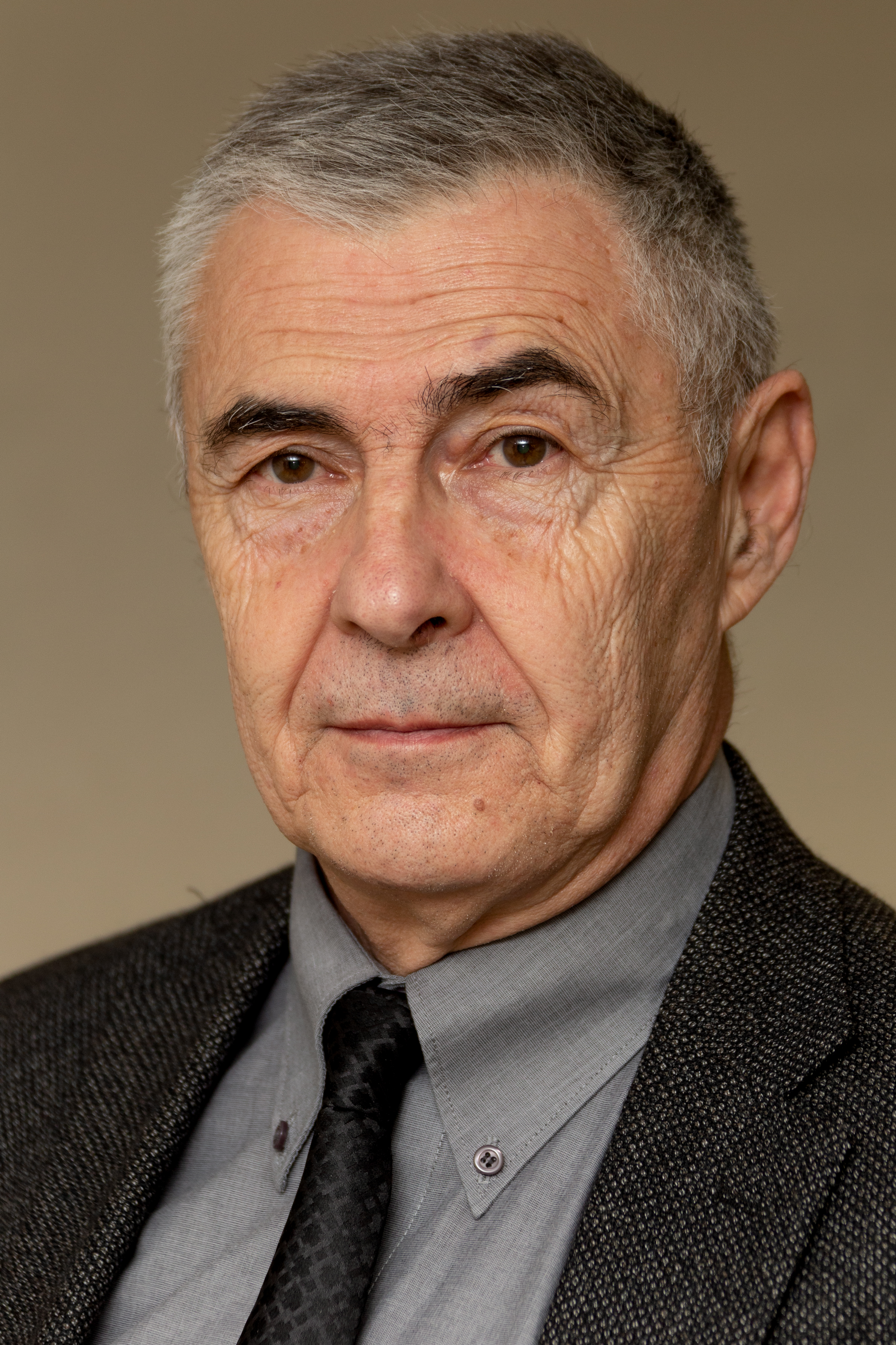
- Željko Glasnović, 2018
- Born: 24 February 1954 (age 72); Zagreb, PR Croatia, FPR Yugoslavia
- Military career
- Allegiance: Canadian Army; French Foreign Legion; Croatian National Guard; Croatian Defence Council; Croatian Army
- Conflicts: Gulf War; Croatian War of Independence; Bosnian War
- Other work: Croatian Parliament (MP)

Željko Glasnović (born 24 February 1954) is a far-right politician and former Croatian military officer. He was a member of Croatian Parliament's club called Independents for Croatia.

== Biography ==
He was born in Zagreb in 1954. His late father was from Janjevo and his late mother was from Posavina. His family emigrated to Canada in 1962, where he became a member of the Canadian Army, in which he served for five years. The next year and a half he spent in the French Foreign Legion. He fought in the Gulf War.

Following the escalation of the Croatian War of Independence, he returned to his homeland and joined the Croatian National Guard in 1991. He was a military commanding officer in Lika, but after the Fall of Vukovar in November 1991, he was moved to Tomislavgrad, where he joined Battalion "Zrinski". He was severely wounded around the heart in the Battle of Kupres. His soldiers transported him from Bugojno to Franciscan monastery in Prozor-Rama. The next two months he spent in a Split hospital but he returned to the Kupres front. He was known as a very strict commander demanding a high level of discipline.

In 1994, he became commanding officer of the 1st brigade of the Croatian Defence Council. He participated in Cincar Operation and Operation Storm. President of Croatia Stjepan Mesić retired him and other generals in 2000.

== Politics ==
Glasnović was not politically active until the 2015 Croatian parliamentary election. He was elected into the Croatian Parliament as a member of Patriotic Coalition in XI district, reserved for Croatian diaspora. During his first MP term (2015–2016) in the 11th electoral district, he was a member of the Committee on Croats outside the Republic of Croatia, War Veterans Committee, Interparliamentary Co-operation Committee and Delegation to the Parliamentary Assembly of the NATO. Although he was elected on the HDZ list, he was never a member of the party.

For the 2016 elections he formed an independent list and won one seat in Croatian Parliament representing the diaspora. He was a member of the Independents for Croatia until 2023 when he joined Croatian Party of Rights.

Glasnović is an advocate of lustration and decommunisation of Croatia.

== Honorary guest of National Democratic Party of Germany ==
In 2018, he was an honorary guest at a party congress of the ultranationalist National Democratic Party of Germany (NPD) in the town of Büdingen. At the congress, he confirmed for the media that NPD members fought alongside him during the Croatian War of Independence and Bosnian War. He stated that during the 1990s wars, "they [NPD members] fought for the values of the West, Christianity, moral integrity, working habits and identity". He added that he shared NPD's world view, in particularly "patriotism, nation, religion and shared European values". When asked if he was a Neo-Nazi – how usually the NPD party is referred to – he refused to directly reply to the question, but added that he is much closer to NPD, than to "communists" from Croatia "who are under a mask of cosmopolitanism and democracy".
