= Bruna Esih =

Croatian politician (born 1975)

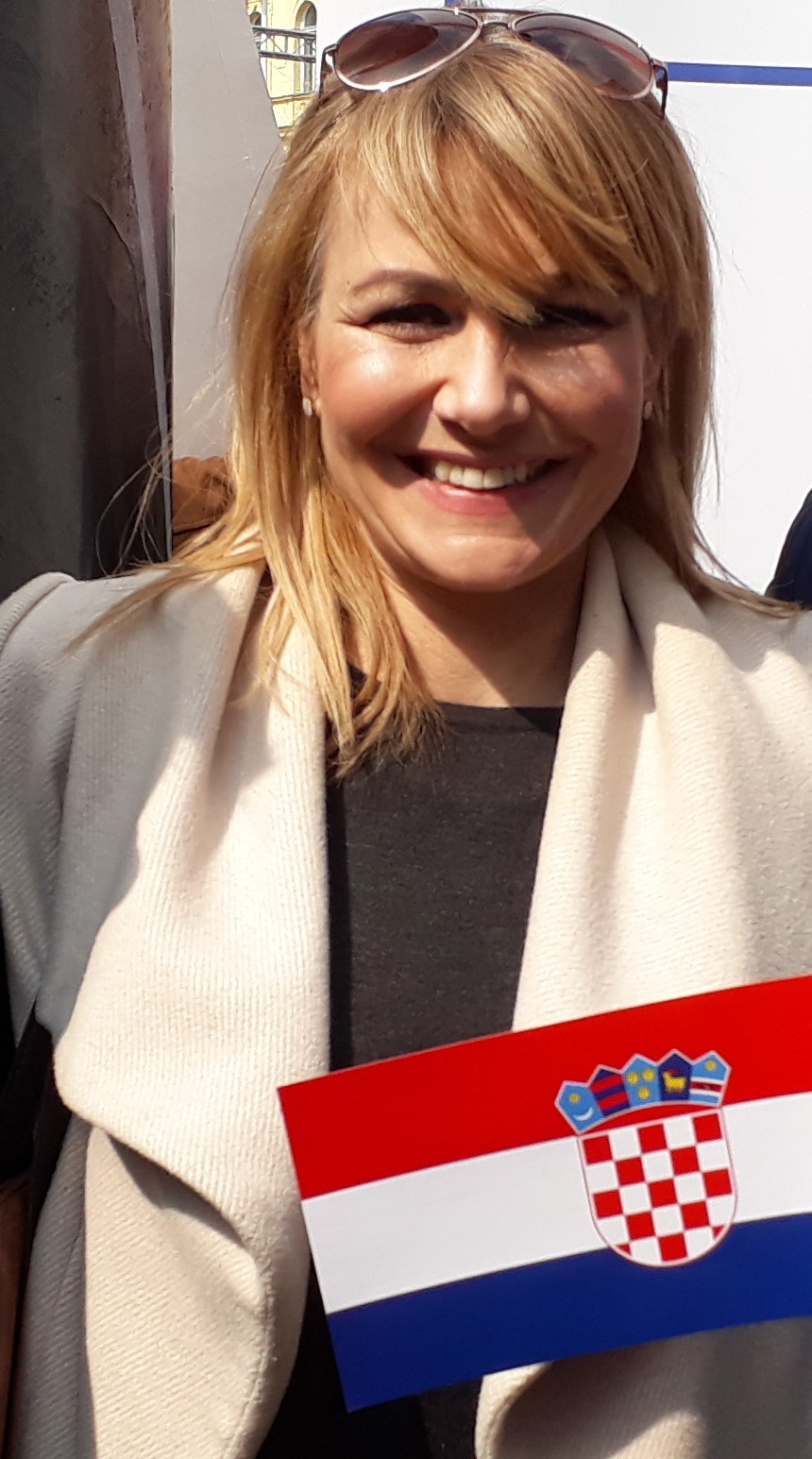
- Born: Bruna Brstilo; 20 May 1975 (age 49); Split, SR Croatia, SFR Yugoslavia
- Occupation(s): politician and croatologist
- Spouse: Renato Esih
- Children: 3
- Parents: Mate Brstilo; Marija Katurić

Bruna Esih (née Brstilo; born 20 May 1975) is a Croatian politician and croatologist, currently serving as president of political party Independents for Croatia.

== Works ==
She researched Bleiburg commemoration and Battle of Vukovar as well as Yugoslav Partisan crimes after World War II in SFR Yugoslavia. She is co-author of three books as a scientist on Ivo Pilar Institute in Zagreb. She was special delegate of President Kolinda Grabar-Kitarović for Bleiburg commemorations.

- Čuvari bleiburške uspomene, Zagreb, 2003.
- Vukovar '91: međunarodni odjeci i značaj, Zagreb, 2004.
- Bleiburg Memento, Zagreb, 2005.

She has collaborated with historian Josip Jurčević.

== Politics ==
Esih is one of the founders of the right-wing Independents for Croatia political party, which split off from the Croatian Democratic Union.
