= Independents for Croatia =

Independents for Croatia Neovisni za Hrvatsku
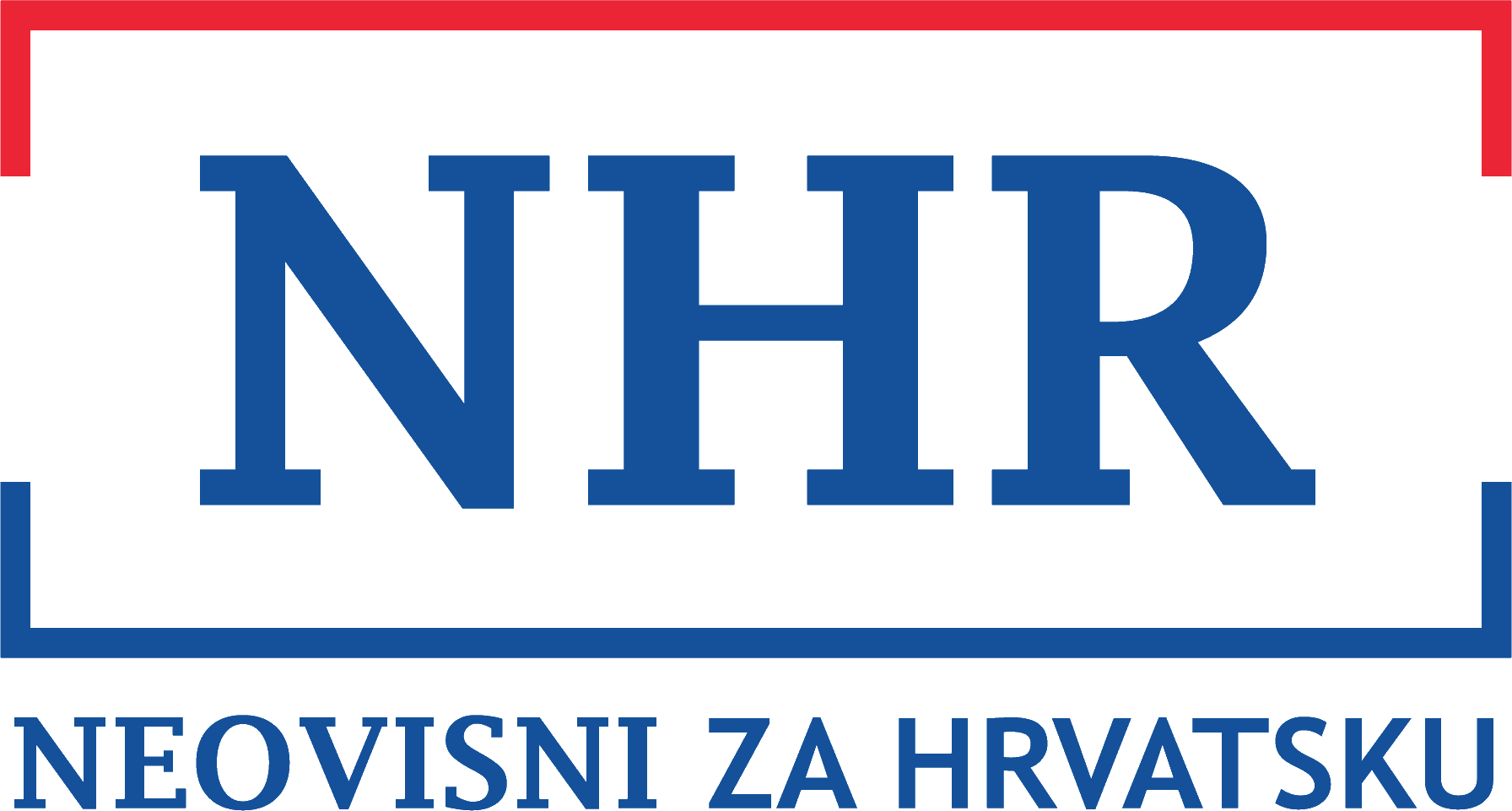
- President: Bruna Esih
- Secretary-General: Ivo Mikić
- Spokesperson: Krešimir Kartelo
- Founder: Bruna Esih
- Founded: 1 June 2017
- Dissolved: 29 July 2024
- Split from: Croatian Democratic Union
- Headquarters: Zagreb, Croatia
- Ideology: Social conservatism Anti-communism; Croatian nationalism National conservatism Right-wing populism
- Political position: Right-wing to far-right
- Colours: Dark blue
- Sabor: 0 / 151
- European Parliament: 0 / 12
- County Prefects: 0 / 21
- Mayors: 0 / 128

The Independents for Croatia (Croatian: Neovisni za Hrvatsku or NHR) was a far-right nationalist and right-wing populist political party in Croatia. The Party was founded on 1 June 2017, and officially registered with the Ministry of Public Administration on 2 June 2017.

== History ==
Bruna Esih was elected as first party president at the party's founding congress. The party secretary-general is Ivo Mikić, while Krešimir Kartelo serves as a political secretary and spokesperson. Party has no vice-president, but only the presidency. Following 2016 parliamentary election, Bruna Esih and Zlatko Hasanbegović entered Croatian Parliament on the Croatian Democratic Union electoral list; Esih as independent, and Hasanbegović as a party member. After HDZ decided to enter into coalition with liberal Croatian People's Party, they decided to leave HDZ parliamentary club and form their own with another independent conservative MP representing Croatian diaspora, Željko Glasnović, and move to the opposition. Following 2017 Zagreb local elections, Party entered Zagreb Assembly and eventually supported mayor Milan Bandić thus helping him to ensure majority.

The party hasn't been active on social media since 2020 and doesn't anymore have a functional website. As of September 2023, it was facing bankruptcy. Party founder Bruna Esih joined Croatian Party of Rights in February 2024 and is running for Sabor on the "For Homeland" coalition list in the 2024 parliamentary election.

== Election results ==
=== Legislative ===
Election	Coalition	Votes	%	Seats	+/–	Government
Election	Coalition	Coalition totals		NHR only		Government
2020	HSP-GO	7,266	0.44%	0 / 151	New	Extra-parliamentary

=== European Parliament ===
Election year	In coalition with	# of total votes	% of overall vote	# of seats won
2019	HSP	46,970	4,37%	0 / 12
