= Ivana Kekin =

Croatian politician (born 1984)

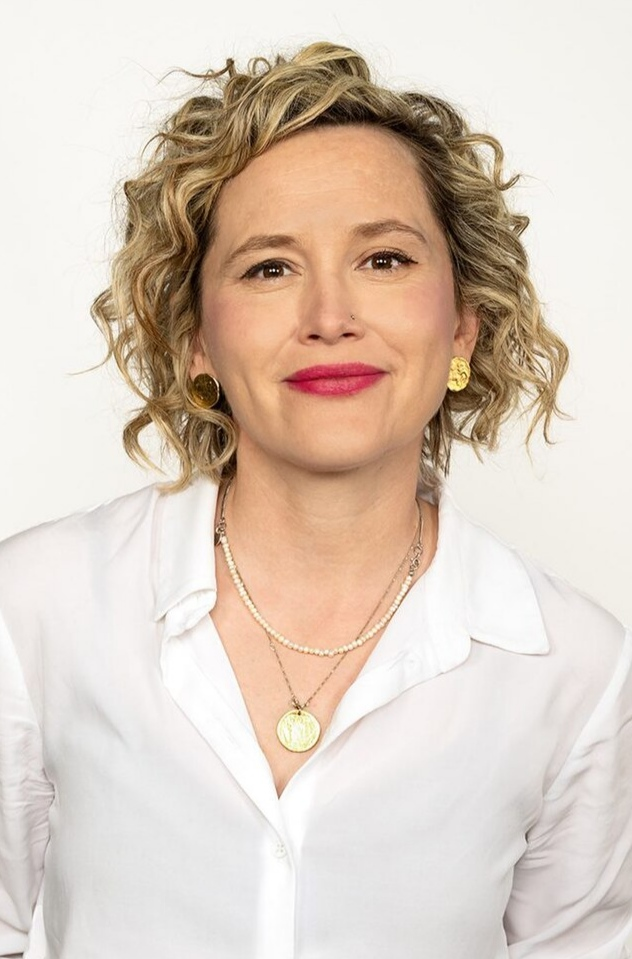
- Kekin in 2024

Member of the Croatian Parliament
- Incumbent
- Assumed office 15 September 2021
- Preceded by: Rada Borić
- Constituency: District I

Member of the Zagreb Assembly
- Incumbent
- Assumed office 17 June 2021

President of New Left
- Incumbent
- Assumed office 13 September 2020
- Preceded by: Dragan Markovina

Personal details
- Born: Ivana Novosel; 24 January 1984 (age 42) Zagreb, SR Croatia, SFR Yugoslavia (modern Croatia)
- Party: New Left (2016–present); We Can! (2022–present)
- Spouse: Mile Kekin (m. 2007)
- Children: 2
- Education: University of Zagreb (MD)

Ivana Kekin (née Novosel; born 24 January 1984) is a Croatian psychiatrist, psychotherapist and politician who has served as member of the Croatian Parliament and vice president of Zagreb Assembly since 2021. She is a member of the We Can! political party and previously served as president of the New Left from 2020 to 2025, before it merged into We Can!.

== Early life and education ==
Ivana Novosel was born in 1984 in Zagreb. She grew up in Sveti Ivan Zelina, in a household of eight, where she completed elementary school and a general gymnasium. In 2002, she moved to Zagreb and enrolled in the University of Zagreb's School of Medicine, graduating in 2008. During her studies she met her future husband Mile Kekin. In 2010, she got a job at Sermon, a clinical trial company, and worked there until she enrolled for specilization in psychiatry at the University Hospital Centre Zagreb in 2011. Ivana Kekin passed her exam in psychiatry in 2016, and received her doctorate in 2018 from the School of Medicine for her doctoral thesis "Cerebral Flow Velocity in Patients with a First Psychotic Episode". In 2020, she became a subspecialist in psychotherapy at the University Hospital Centre Zagreb.

== Political career ==
In January 2016, after the 2015 parliamentary elections, Kekin joined New Left dissatisfied with the actions of the new government led by Tomislav Karamarko's Croatian Democratic Union (HDZ). She participated in the "Croatia Can Do Better" protest for a new school curriculum reform on 1 June, and gave a speech emphasizing that it was a protest for the future and "... [kids] who will not fill out buses to Stuttgart but will know how to do well here".

=== Croatian Parliament ===
During the 2020 parliamentary election in July, Kekin ran for member of the Croatian Parliament in the electoral district VII for the Green–Left Coalition, which went on to win one seat that went to Rada Borić. In September 2020, Kekin became the president of New Left. In September 2021, she became a member of the Croatian Parliament as Borić's deputy, who left to focus on the politics of Zagreb. Shortly after, in October, Kekin joined several committees: Committee on Health and Social Policy, Committee on Family, Youth and Sport, Committee on Interparliamentary Cooperation, Committee on Justice and Committee on Gender Equality. During her term, she has been active on the issues of healthcare privatization, mental health of the youth, problem gambling and femicide.

In early 2023, she led the Not Good for Maritime Resources (Croatian: Nije dobro za pomorsko dobro) campaign in response to an amendment that would have allowed for the granting of public maritime resources to private concessions "for periods of several dozen years", as part of a broader change of the Maritime Domain and Sea Ports Act. Public hearings were held and a petition against the amendment collected around 30,000 signatures, resulting in it being dropped from the final law. Kekin's work also contributed to new amendments to the Gambling Act, which saw overwhelming support from all parties with 131 votes for, out of 151. Among new laws are a ban on slot machines in cafés and stricter advertising rules.

During her term, from 2021 to 2024, she was a substitute member of the Parliamentary Assembly of the Council of Europe.

On 16 May 2024, in the 2024 Croatian parliamentary election, Kekin was reelected to the Croatian Parliament in the first electoral district. On 25 May, she became president of the Committee for Health and Social Policy, and in June joined the Committee for Human Rights and Rights of National Minorities.

=== Zagreb Assembly ===
In May 2021, Kekin was elected to the Zagreb Assembly, and became its vice president in June. For the duration of her first term, she spoke in the Assembly only six times. She was reelected in June 2025.

=== European Parliament elections ===
During the 2024 European Parliament election in June, despite being at the bottom of the We Can! list, Kekin was elected to the European Parliament with over 11,000 votes, or 25% of the preferential votes. She ceded her seat to Gordan Bosanac in order to focus on domestic politics, adding that "as a team, we know very well that at this moment the most competent person for this [position] is Gordan Bosanac."

=== 2024 Croatian presidential elections ===
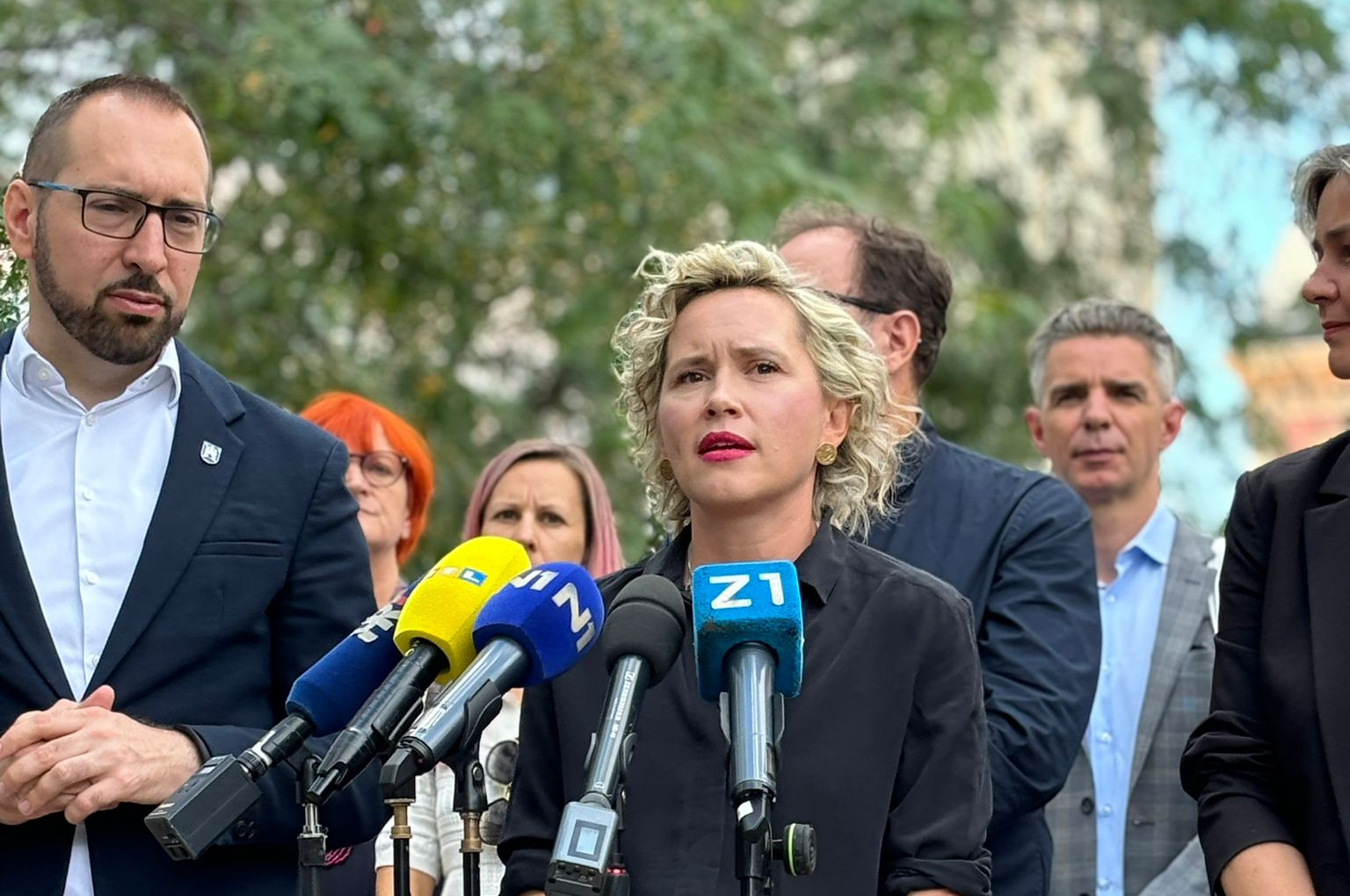
Kekin announcing her presidential campaign

Ahead of the 2024 presidential election, Kekin launched her campaign on 10 September 2024. She was the We Can! candidate with a campaign slogan "President of the New Generation". She ran on a green-left and progressive platform, with an emphasis on the problems in the healthcare system, such as expensive public-private contracts for medical scans and corruption, especially after former Health Minister Vili Beroš was arrested in November 2024 for corruption charges. The total sum earned from donations to her campaign was €41,926, the average donation being little under €30. By 10 December, she accumulated 18,000 signatures, enough to make her an official candidate. She got 144,533 votes or 8.89% of the total vote in the first round, placing her fourth overall–5,902 votes behind Marija Selak Raspudić. Following the results, she endorsed Zoran Milanović for the runoffs.

== Political positions ==
=== Healthcare ===
During her term, she has been active on the issue of healthcare privatization, more precisely public-private contracts between the government and private clinics. She criticized the 2024 presidential candidate Dragan Primorac, endorsed by HDZ and the owner of a private hospital Sv. Katarina, because he had received €3.5 million from the Ministry of Health from 2013 to 2023 for examinations and medical procedures. Kekin has claimed that these contracts are more expensive than medical equipment that would do the same scans, costing the average taxpayer more money, claiming that "everyone knew, healthcare was being left in the hands of entrepreneurs close to HDZ."

=== Mental health ===
Psychiatrist herself, she emphasized the need to "have a strong and systematic support network for both parents and children" in order to better combat the mental health illness that affects around 50,000 children and adolescents in Croatia. That would include universities expanding their capacity to educate and train more pediatric psychiatrists, as there are currently only 55, opening more mental health facilities across the country and hiring more school psychologists.

=== Gambling and betting addiction ===
In 2024, during her presidential campaign, Kekin claimed that gambling directly affects 40,000 Croatian citizens and that tackling the issue is going to be one of her top priorities as president. She advocates for stronger regulation on gambling and betting, including bans on slot machines in cafés, on advertisements featuring influencers and famous athletes, and on all betting shops in close proximity to kindergartens and schools.

=== Women's rights ===
Kekin is an active advocate for women's abortion rights and supports amending abortion to the Croatian Constitution. She also advocates for equality in the labour market and equal representation of men and women in political life. Kekin has been vocal on the issues of violence against women and femicide, saying that "it seems like not a month goes by in Croatia without news of a murdered woman." She advocates for increased governmental efforts to ensure women's safety in reporting abuse and seeking help, and that victims of abuse should be provided with safe housing, as well as legal and emotional support.

== Personal life ==
Kekin is married to Mile Kekin, frontman of the punk rock band Hladno Pivo, with whom she has a son and a daughter. She also appeared in Hladno Pivo's 2013 music video "Bilo koji broj" ("Any Number"). Mile Kekin also sang about her in his 2025 solo single "Ilica i marica" ("Ilica and a Black Maria"; a pun on "Ivica i Marica", meaning "Hansel and Gretel").
