= Raspudić =

Raspudić may refer to:

- Boris Raspudić (born 1982), Bosnian Serb footballer
- Nino Raspudić (born 1975), Croatian politician
- Marija Selak Raspudić (born 1982), Croatian politician
