= Opinion polling for the next Croatian parliamentary election =

In the run-up to the next Croatian parliamentary election, various organisations have been carrying out monthly opinion polling to gauge voting intention in Croatia. Results of such polls are displayed in this article.

== Graphical summary ==
LOESS curve of polling conducted, excluding undecided voters.

== Party standings ==
Surveys in Croatia are conducted by specialized companies in the field of public opinion polls, and their results are published in cooperation with national television or newspapers. The media that publish the results are listed in the table below according to which TV show they publish the results, with which poll company they cooperate, the size of the poll, the number of polls conducted so far and the time of publication of the results.

Media	Presentation of the results	Polling firm	Poll size	Conducted polls	Time of publication of polls
HRT	Dnevnik 2 at 19:00	Promocija plus	1,100–1,400	6	20th of the month
RTL	RTL Danas at 18:30	Promocija plus	1,300	25	Between 3rd and 13th of the month, usually on Sunday
Nova TV	Dnevnik Nove TV at 19:15	Ipsos	980–1,000	30	Between 22nd and 31st of the month
Večernji list	Daily newspapers	2x1 komunikacije	1,041	9	Between 29th and 31st of the month, or between 1st and 3rd of next month

Poll results published by major media are listed in the table below in reverse chronological order, showing the most recent first, and using the date of publication, name of polling firm with a link to the page of results and poll size. The highest percentage figure in each polling survey is displayed in bold, and the background shaded in the leading party's color. In the instance that there is a tie, then all tied parties cells would be shaded. The lead column on the right shows the percentage-point difference between the two parties with the highest figures. When a specific poll does not show a data figure for a party, the party's cell corresponding to that poll is shown with a dash. Table also include other elections that are held between two parliamentary elections.

Publication date	Polling firm	Responses	HDZ	SDP	DP	DOMiNO	PiP	Možemo	Most	HS	Fokus	IDS	NPS	RF	Centar	HSS	HSU	HNS	Drito (Note: referred to as Independent List of Marija Selak Raspudić before March 12th)	Others	Undecided	Lead
8 Nov 2026	Promocija plus	1,000	**24.9**	17.5	1.7	1.6	1.5	13.6	9.4	0.9	0.4	1.0	1.0	-	1.2	0.5	0.8	0.8	2.1	2.3 (Note: HSLS (0.6%) Others (1.7%))	18.8	7.4
27 Oct 2026	Ipsos	995	**25.5**	17.0	2.2	1.7	1.9	13.7	10.1	1.2	-	1.2	0.4	-	0.7	0.6	2.0	0.1	1.8	6.7 (Note: DOSIP (2.2%) HSLS (1.4%) NL Dario Zurovec (0.9%) Independent Party (0.5%) GLAS (0.1%) Others (1.6%))	13.2	8.5
21 Oct 2026	**Motion of no confidence in Prime Minister Andrej Plenković fails to pass**																					
11 Oct 2026	Promocija plus	1,000	**25.0**	19.5	1.8	1.5	1.2	13.8	9.8	-	-	1.1	1.0	-	1.2	-	-	-	2.0	6.5	15.6	5.5
22 Sep 2026	Ipsos	997	**26.4**	17.9	2.8	1.2	0.3	13.3	9.2	0.3	-	1.2	0.3	-	1.2	0.8	1.7	0.4	2.1	5.8 (Note: DOSIP (1.9%) NL Dario Zurovec (0.8%) Independent Party (0.6%) HSLS (0.4%) SDSS (0.1%) Others (2.0%))	15.1	8.5
6 Sep 2026	Promocija plus	1,000	**25.3**	20.5	1.6	1.4	1.1	12.9	9.5	0.8	-	1.0	1.0	-	1.1	0.7	0.8	0.9	1.8	2.7 (Note: HSLS (0.4%) Others (2.3%))	16.9	4.8
26 Aug 2026	Ipsos	997	**26.6**	18.2	2.4	0.8	1.0	13.6	9.3	0.5	-	1.7	0.4	-	0.6	0.4	2.8	0.1	1.7	4.5 (Note: DOSIP (1.8%) Civic Liberal Alliance (0.5%) HSLS (0.4%) HDS (0.3%) SDSS (0.2%) Independent Party (0.1%) Others (1.2%))	15.4	8.4
31 Jul 2026	Ipsos	997	**27.4**	18.8	2.6	1.8	1.1	13.3	9.0	1.0	-	1.0	0.4	-	0.9	0.3	2.3	0.1	1.7	5.7 (Note: DOSIP (2.0%) HSLS (1.0%) Independent Party (0.6%) SDSS (0.4%) HDS (0.3%) NL Dario Zurovec (0.2%) Others (1.2%))	12.6	8.6
5 Jul 2026	Promocija plus	1,300	**27.0**	21.5	2.1	1.1	1.0	12.2	7.7	-	-	1.2	-	-	1.0	-	-	-	2.2	6.2	16.8	5.5
26 Jun 2026	Ipsos	994	**26.8**	19.7	2.8	1.4	1.1	12.5	8.3	1.1	-	1.6	0.4	-	0.8	0.8	2.4	0.4	2.2	5.8 (Note: DOSIP (1.9%) NL Dario Zurovec (0.8%) Independent Party (0.7%) HSLS (0.3%) SDSS (0.2%) Others (1.9%))	11.9	7.1
7 Jun 2026	Promocija plus	1,000	**27.3**	22.0	2.2	1.2	1.2	12.0	7.5	-	-	1.1	-	-	-	-	-	-	2.4	7.0	16.1	5.3
26 May 2026	Ipsos	997	**27.2**	20.3	3.0	1.7	1.0	12.3	7.9	1.6	-	1.3	0.3	-	0.8	0.5	2.2	0.4	2.2	5.0 (Note: DOSIP (1.4%) Independent Party (0.6%) HDS (0.5%) NL Dario Zurovec (0.2%) HSLS (0.2%) SDSS (0.2%) Others (1.9%))	12.3	6.9
11 May 2026	Promocija plus	1,000	**29.0**	22.2	2.0	1.0	0.9	12.0	7.3	0.8	0.3	1.0	0.9	-	1.1	0.4	0.7	0.8	2.5	2.0 (Note: HSLS (0.5%) others (1.5%))	15.1	6.8
27 Apr 2026	Ipsos	990	**27.7**	19.8	2.6	2.1	1.1	12.0	7.3	2.2	-	1.3	0.2	-	1.0	0.9	2.1	0.2	1.1	3.5 (Note: DOSIP (0.5%) HDS (0.5%) NL Dario Zurovec (0.3%) HSLS (0.2%) Independent Party (0.2%) SDSS (0.2%) Others (1.6%))	14.9	7.9
5 Apr 2026	Promocija plus	1,000	**30.0**	22.8	2.1	1.1	0.9	11.8	6.4	-	-	1.1	-	-	1.2	0.6	-	-	2.2	4.9	14.9	7.2
26 Mar 2026	Ipsos	994	**28.3**	19.6	2.4	1.7	1.0	11.0	7.4	2.1	-	1.4	0.1	-	0.8	1.0	2.1	0.4	2.1	3.9 (Note: DOSIP (0.7%) HSLS (0.7%) Independent Party (0.5%) HDS (0.3%) NL Dario Zurovec (0.2%) SDSS (0.2%) Others (1.3%))	14.7	8.7
8 Mar 2026	Promocija plus	1,000	**29.7**	22.5	2.4	1.1	1.0	12.3	6.2	0.7	0.3	1.1	0.9	-	1.0	0.7	0.5	0.6	2.6	2.2 (Note: HSLS (0.6%) others (1.6%))	14.2	7.2
26 Feb 2026	Ipsos	989	**28.6**	20.0	2.7	1.4	1.0	10.4	6.9	1.9	-	1.5	0.2	-	0.6	0.9	2.5	0.3	2.3	5.9 (Note: DOSIP (1.3%) Independent Party (1.0%) NL Dario Zurovec (1.0%) SDSS (0.3%) HSLS (0.3%) Others (2.0%))	12.9	8.6
20 Feb 2026	Promocija plus	1,000	**29.8**	22.5	2.0	1.0	1.1	12.8	5.0	0.9	0.5	1.2	1.0	-	0.8	0.6	0.5	0.6	2.9	3.1 (Note: HSLS (1.0%) others (2.1%))	13.7	7.3
8 Feb 2026	Promocija plus	1,000	**30.6**	23.1	1.6	-	1.0	13.3	5.4	-	-	1.1	1.0	-	1.0	-	-	-	2.4	6.4	13.1	7.5
26 Jan 2026	Ipsos	989	**28.6**	21.2	2.7	-	-	10.5	6.3	-	-	-	-	-	-	-	-	-	2.6	-	12.7	7.4
2026
25 Dec 2025	Ipsos	994	**27.8**	20.6	4.0	-	-	11.1	6.7	-	-	-	-	-	-	-	-	-	2.5	-	11.8	7.2
7 Dec 2025	Promocija plus	1,300	**27.5**	22.5	2.9	1.3	0.8	12.4	6.2	0.5	0.4	0.7	0.5	-	0.9	0.5	0.6	0.6	2.8	2.3 (Note: HSLS (0.4%) others (1.9%))	16.6	5.0
25 Nov 2025	Ipsos	989	**26.9**	20.8	3.2	-	-	12.0	6.0	-	-	-	-	-	-	-	-	-	-	-	13.2	6.1
9 Nov 2025	Promocija plus	1,300	**27.0**	23.5	2.6	1.4	1.3	10.7	5.8	0.5	0.4	1.3	0.8	-	1.0	0.7	0.5	0.6	2.6	3.0 (Note: HSLS (0.5%) others (2.5%))	16.3	3.5
24 Oct 2025	Ipsos	990	**27.7**	21.4	3.0	-	-	11.8	5.8	-	-	-	-	-	-	-	-	-	-	-	-	6.3
12 Oct 2025	Promocija plus	1,300	**26.2**	22.7	2.2	1.8	1.2	11.1	6.6	-	-	1.2	-	-	1.6	-	-	-	2.4	6.7	16.8	3.5
25 Sep 2025	Ipsos	989	**27.5**	22.5	2.5	-	-	10.6	6.0	-	-	-	-	-	-	-	-	-	-	-	14.6	5.0
7 Sep 2025	Promocija plus	1,300	**28.2**	23.0	1.5	1.4	1.3	11.3	6.6	-	0.5	1.2	0.8	0.7	1.1	0.7	0.5	0.6	1.8	2.0 (Note: HSLS (0.4%), others (1.6%))	16.8	5.2
25 Aug 2025	Ipsos	983	**27.8**	22.9	2.8	2.0	-	10.1	5.7	-	-	2.1	-	-	-	-	-	-	-	-	13.6	4.9
3 Aug 2025	Promocija plus	1,300	**29.4**	22.9	1.6	1.6	0.9	10.9	6.0	0.5	0.5	1.0	0.7	0.6	1.8	0.6	0.5	0.5	1.7	2.0 (Note: HSLS (0.7%), others (1.3%))	16.3	6.5
25 Jul 2025	Ipsos	983	**28.5**	22.0	2.4	2.2	-	10.9	5.9	2.4	-	-	-	-	-	-	2.0	-	-	-	13.2	6.5
13 Jul 2025	Promocija plus	1,300	**29.3**	22.7	2.1	1.9	0.9	10.3	5.8	0.5	0.6	1.1	1.1	0.7	1.3	0.6	0.4	0.6	1.8	1.7 (Note: HSLS (0.4%), others (1.3%))	16.7	6.6
25 Jun 2025	Ipsos	983	**27.7**	23.1	2.7	2.3	-	10.7	5.9	2.9	-	-	-	-	-	-	-	-	-	-	11.8	4.6
8 Jun 2025	Promocija plus	1,300	**29.1**	23.8	2.3	2.2	0.5	9.8	5.5	0.6	0.3	1.1	1.1	0.3	1.5	0.7	0.6	0.6	2.4	2.2 (Note: HSLS (0.6%), others (1.6%))	15.5	5.3
1 June 2025	**2025 Croatian local elections** **– second round**																					
24 May 2025	Ipsos	989	**29.6**	23.5	2.7	-	-	9.7	6.2	-	-	2.7	-	-	-	-	-	-	-	-	11.8	6.1
18 May 2025	**2025 Croatian local elections** **– first round**																					
1 May 2025	2x1 komunikacije	1041	**27.5**	23.2	2.2	1.5	-	7.9	6.1	1.1	-	1.6	-	-	1.2	1.0	1.9	-	-	7.4	17.4	4.3
25 Apr 2025	Ipsos	990	**25.8**	25.2	4.3	2.5	-	10.6	5.7	-	-	-	-	-	-	-	-	-	-	-	11.3	0.6
6 Apr 2025	Promocija plus	1,300	25.8	**26.4**	2.5	2.4	1.0	10.2	7.0	0.5	0.6	1.1	1.2	0.8	1.1	1.0		1.1	-	1.3	13.7	0.6
31 Mar 2025	2x1 komunikacije	983	**27.5**	23.5	2.0	1.6	-	7.9	6.4	1.0	-	1.6	-	-	1.0	-	2.3	-	-	-	16.9	4.0
25 Mar 2025	Ipsos	983	**26.9**	25.0	3.7	-	-	11.3	5.8	-	-	-	-	-	-	-	-	-	-	-	14.4	1.9
20 Mar 2025	Promocija plus	1,000	25.4	**26.0**	2.0	1.9	0.9	9.3	6.9	0.5	0.6	1.3	1.3	0.6	1.0	1.2	0.5	0.9	-	-	17.4	0.6
9 Mar 2025	Promocija plus	1,300	26.1	**26.3**	2.2	1.8	0.5	10.2	6.8	0.4	0.4	1.5	1.4	0.6	0.9	1.4	0.4	1.0	-	-	15.2	0.2
3 Mar 2025	2x1 komunikacije	1,041	**26.9**	22.1	1.8	1.5	-	7.0	6.4	-	-	-	-	-	-	-	3.1	-	-	3.2	17.9	4.8
25 Feb 2025	Ipsos	984	**26.3**	25.7	2.7	-	-	9.7	6.0	-	-	-	-	-	-	-	-	-	-	-	15.8	0.6
20 Feb 2025	Promocija plus	1,000	**25.9**	23.6	2.2	2.0	1.1	9.2	6.8	0.8	1.0	1.1	1.1	1.1	1.2	1.2	0.8	1.0	-	-	16.6	2.3
9 Feb 2025	Promocija plus	1,300	**26.0**	23.5	2.4	2.1	0.5	9.9	6.5	0.4	0.7	1.2	1.2	0.8	1.1	1.3	0.8	1.1	-	-	17.1	2.5
1 Feb 2025	2x1 komunikacije	1,041	**28.9**	21.7	1.9	2.2	-	7.1	6.1	1.0	-	1.5	-	-	1.4	-	2.8	-	-	-	17.5	7.2
25 Jan 2025	Ipsos	993	**27.3**	24.3	1.5	1.5	-	10.6	6.3	-	-	-	-	-	-	-	-	-	-	-	14.4	3.0
12 Jan 2025	**2024–25 Croatian presidential election – second round**																					
10 Jan 2025	Promocija plus	1,000	**26.6**	23.1	2.5	-	0.7	9.1	6.9	0.6	0.9	1.2	1.0	1.0	1.3	1.2	0.7	1.0	-	-	16.8	3.5
2025
29 Dec 2024	**2024–25 Croatian presidential election** **– first round**																					
24 Dec 2024	Ipsos	982	**27.8**	22.6	2.5	-	-	9.6	7.9	-	-	-	-	-	-	-	2.5	-	-	-	15.1	5.2
20 Dec 2024	Promocija plus	1,000	**26.6**	22.9	2.9	2.9	0.7	9.2	6.8	0.4	1.0	1.5	0.8	0.8	1.2	1.1	0.9	1.1	-	-	16.8	3.7
3 Dec 2024	2x1 komunikacije	1,041	**29.8**	21.1	3.1	2.8	-	6.9	6.2	1.4	-	1.6	-	-	1.5	-	2.7	-	-	-	17.0	8.7
25 Nov 2024	Ipsos	986	**29.4**	21.5	4.9	-	-	10.7	7.1	-	-	-	-	-	-	-	-	-	-	-	11.6	7.9
20 Nov 2024	Promocija plus	1,000	**26.8**	22.8	3.0	1.8	0.6	8.9	6.5	0.6	0.9	1.5	0.8	1.1	1.9	1.5	1.0	1.0	-	-	17.9	4.0
15 Nov 2024	**Arrest and dismissal of Vili Beroš**																					
10 Nov 2024	Promocija plus	1,300	**26.7**	22.2	3.5	1.3	0.6	9.0	6.4	0.6	1.1	1.3	0.8	1.1	1.9	1.0	1.1	1.1	-	-	17.8	4.5
25 Oct 2024	Ipsos	980	**29.8**	21.6	3.0	-	-	9.4	7.3	-	-	-	-	-	-	-	-	-	-	-	16.8	8.2
20 Oct 2024	Promocija plus	1,300	**27.5**	22.5	3.1	2.1	0.6	8.7	6.1	0.6	0.7	1.4	0.9	0.8	1.7	1.0	0.8	0.9	-	-	17.2	5.0
6 Oct 2024	Promocija plus	1,300	**26.9**	21.6	4.5	1.9	-	8.6	6.1	-	-	1.7	-	1.6	1.1	-	1.1	-	-	-	17.4	5.3
1 Oct 2024	2x1 komunikacije	1,041	**30.1**	20.9	4.9	-	-	7.1	6.2	1.2	-	1.8	-	-	2.0	-	1.8	-	-	4.8	17.5	9.2
28 Sep 2024	**Split of DOMiNO from DP**																					
25 Sep 2024	Ipsos	991	**30.3**	20.4	5.4		-	10.4	6.7	-	-	-	-	-	-	-	-	-	-	-	14.5	9.9
8 Sep 2024	Promocija Plus	1,300	**27.3**	21.2	4.6		-	8.4	7.0	0.9	1.0	1.3	0.6	0.8	1.3	1.1	0.8	1.0	-	-	17.4	6.1
29 Aug 2024	2x1 komunikacije	1,041	**30.3**	20.8	7.0		-	6.9	6.2	1.2	0.9	1.8	-	-	2.0	-	1.4	-	-	-	17.7	9.5
23 Aug 2024	Ipsos	984	**29.9**	19.6	6.4		-	10.2	7.1	-	-	-	-	-	-	-	-	-	-	-	13.1	10.3
4 Aug 2024	Promocija plus	1,300	**28.5**	22.2	6.7		1.0	9.1	6.0	0.7	1.0	1.5	-	1.2	0.8	0.9	0.5	0.6	-	-	15.7	6.3
31 Jul 2024	2x1 komunikacije	1,041	**30.3**	20.6	7.5		-	7.1	6.0	1.1	1.4	1.6	-	-	2.1	-	1.4	-	-	-	18.1	9.7
25 Jul 2024	Ipsos	984	**30.2**	19.0	7.5		-	8.5	7.0	-	-	-	-	-	-	-	-	-	-	-	14.8	11.2
7 Jul 2024	Promocija plus	1,300	**30.7**	25.9	7.1		0.8	10.3	6.6	0.3	1.4	1.3	0.5	0.8	0.3	0.6	0.5	0.8	-	0.9	10.4	4.8
1 Jul 2024	2x1 komunikacije	1,041	**30.0**	21.1	7.6		-	7.4	5.9	1.1	1.2	1.5	-	-	2.1	-	1.3	-	-	-	12.9	8.9
25 Jun 2024	Ipsos	1,000	**31.5**	20.5	7.8		-	9.1	7.7	-	-	-	-	-	-	-	-	-	-	-	12.9	11.0
9 Jun 2024	**2024 European Parliament election**																					
7 Jun 2024	Promocija plus	1,300	**29.8**	22.3	8.4		1.2	9.2	6.7	0.5	1.4	2.0	-	0.8	1.0	1.0	0.6	0.7	-	-	10.7	7.5
24 May 2024	Ipsos	990	**30.5**	20.2	7.4		-	11.1	8.6	-	-	-	-	-	-	-	-	-	-	10.6 (Note: each under 2%)	11.6	10.3
12 May 2024	Promocija plus	1,000	**29.5**	23.2	8.3		1.2	9.3	5.6	0.7	1.3	1.1	1.0	1.0	1.1	1.4	1.2	0.8	-	-	9.5	6.3
25 Apr 2024	Ipsos	1,000	**28.5**	22.2	10.1		-	12.3	8.3	-	-	-	-	-	-	-	-	-	-	(Note: each under 2.5%)	6.7	6.3
17 Apr 2024	2024 election results	2,180,411	34.42	25.40	9.56			9.10	8.02		2.25	2.25	1.22	0.80	(Note: with SDP)	-	(Note: with HDZ)	-	-	6.98	-	9.0
