= Next Croatian parliamentary election =

- By 30 April 2028
- All 151 seats in the Croatian Parliament; 76 seats needed for a majority
- Opinion polls
Party	Leader	Current seats
HDZ-led coalition (Note: Including HSLS, HNS, HDS, HSU and HSS)	Andrej Plenković	63
SDP–Možemo!	Siniša Hajdaš Dončić; Sandra Benčić	45
DP	Ivan Penava	8
Most	Nikola Grmoja	7
Centar–NPS–GLAS	Marijana Puljak; Matija Posavec; Stanko Borić	5
DOMiNO–HS	Mario Radić; Marijan Pavliček	4
IDS–PGS	Dalibor Paus	2
Drito	Marija Selak Raspudić; Nino Raspudić	2
DOSIP	Dalija Orešković	1
Independents	–	5
Vacant	–	1
Minority lists
SDSS	Milorad Pupovac	3
DZMH	Róbert Jankovics	1
Kali Sara	Veljko Kajtazi	1
BZ	Armin Hodžić	1
Independents	– (Note: Vladimir Bilek (Czech and Slovak seat) and Marin Corva (Italian seat))	2
Incumbent Prime Minister
Andrej Plenković; HDZ

Parliamentary elections are scheduled to be held in Croatia by 30 April 2028.

== Background ==
=== Pre-election events ===
On 9 December 2025, four right-wing opposition parties (Home and National Rally, Croatian Sovereignists, Croatian Party of Rights and Bloc for Croatia) signed a cooperation agreement in order to run together in the election. Signed in Vukovar, the pact has been dubbed the 'Vukovar coalition' (Croatian: Vukovarska koalicija) as a working title. On 27 October 2026, the party leaders stated at a press conference that the coalition is soon set to announce a new, official name and define ten shared, programmatic policy points.

On 19 September 2026, the main opposition Social Democratic Party of Croatia and the green We Can! held a joint press conference at St. Mark's Square in Zagreb to announce that they are formally starting the negotiations of a coalition agreement and the program of the next government.

== Electoral system ==
Electoral districts in use from 2023

The 151 members of the Croatian Parliament are elected from ten geographical and two special constituencies. 140 seats are elected from ten 14-seat constituencies (1st–10th constituencies) by open list proportional representation using a 5% electoral threshold, with seats allocated using the d'Hondt method. Voters can give their "preference vote" to a single candidate on the list, but only candidates who have received at least 10% of the party's votes take precedence over the other candidates on the list. A further three seats are elected in a special electoral district (11th constituency) for Croatian citizens living abroad.

Eight seats are elected from a constituency for national minorities (12th constituency), with three seats for Serbs and one each for Italians, Hungarian, Czechs and Slovaks, Albanians/Bosniaks/Macedonians/Montenegrins/Slovenes and Austrians/Bulgarians/Germans/Jews/Poles/Roma/Romanians/Rusyns/Russians/Turks/Ukrainians/Vlachs. Voters with the right to vote in the 12th constituency can choose to either vote for a candidate list on the ballot in the district they belong to according to their place of residence (one of the ten geographical districts) or for a candidate of their minority in the 12th constituency.

Candidate lists may be proposed independently by one political party or by two or more political parties (coalition list) which are registered in Croatia on the day the decision to call the elections is announced, or by voters. Voters can propose independent candidate lists by collecting 500 signatures of residents of the constituency the list is running in.

== Opinion polls ==
LOESS curve of polling conducted, excluding undecided voters.
