= Zagreb Assembly =

Elected lawmaking body of Zagreb, Croatia

City Assembly of the City of Zagreb Gradska skupština Grada Zagreba

Type
- Type: Unicameral

Leadership
- President: Matej Mišić, SDP since 10 June 2025
- Deputy Presidents: Marina Ivandić (Možemo!); Teodor Celakoski (Možemo!); Mislav Herman (HDZ); Marija Selak Raspudić (Drito)

Structure
- Seats: 47
- Political groups: Government (25): Možemo!–SDP (25); M! (17); SDP (8); Opposition (22): HDZ–DP–HSU (8); HDZ (5); DP (2); HSU (1); Drito (6); Zagrepčanke (3); Independent (2) (Note: Dina Dogan and Kristina Tabak); HNS (1); Jedino Hrvatska! (3); BLOK (1); HSLS (1); Independent (1) (Note: Trpimir Goluža)

Elections
- Last election: 18 May 2025
- Next election: TBD

Meeting place
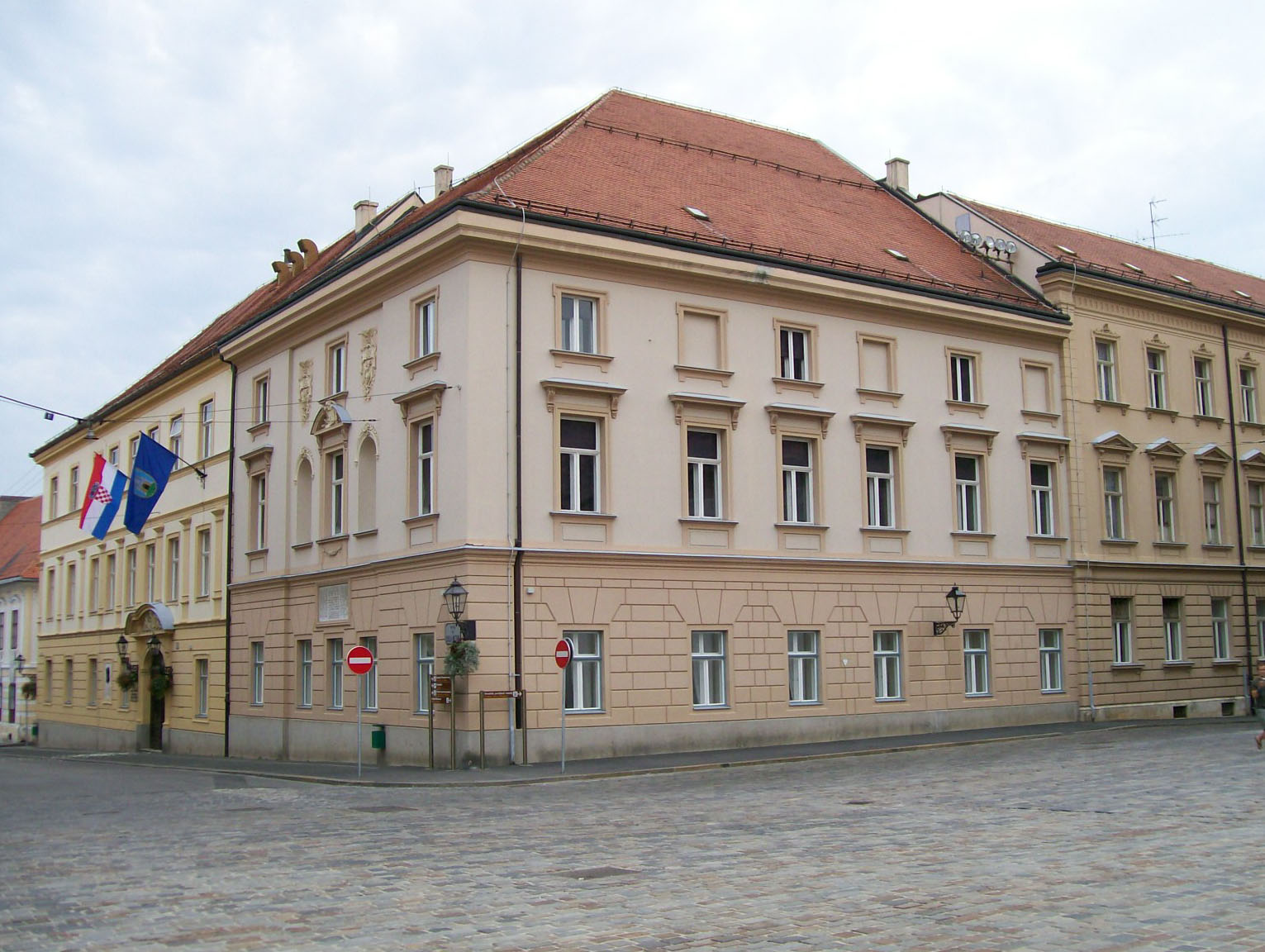
- Old City Hall

Website
- www.skupstina.zagreb.hr

The City Assembly of the City of Zagreb (Croatian: Gradska skupština Grada Zagreba, short: GSGZ) is the lawmaking body of the Croatian capital of Zagreb. It consists of 47 members who were elected by universal suffrage and secret ballot at 2025 elections for a term of four years. The assembly meets at the Old City Hall, close to the St. Mark's Square. This representative body passes acts within the self-governing scope of the City of Zagreb and performs other duties in accordance with the state laws and its own Statute. The assembly serves as a check against the mayor in a mayor-council government model. It has 24 permanent and occasional working bodies with oversight of various functions of the city government.

== Assembly members ==
The assembly comprises 51 members elected in a general, free, secret and direct ballot by the citizens of Zagreb according to the principle of proportional representation. Elections take place every four years – at the same time as for the Mayor. According to the article 49 of the Statute of the City of Zagreb, "councilors perform they duty honorarily and do not receive a salary" but are entitled to compensation so according to the Decision on the Regular Financing of the Parties, male representatives annually receive around 56,000 kunas (cca. €7,545), and female representatives 62,000 kunas (cca. €8,355). However, this money is paid to the representatives' special giro account and can only be spent on the program of a political party or as a charitable donation. In addition, each of the 51 representatives receives 1,200 kunas (cca. €160) per month for work at the Assembly, regardless of whether they have attended Assembly meeting or not, and around 1,250 kunas (cca. €170) for the work in assembly committees (each representative is member of at least one committee).

Parties with at least three AM's or at least three independent AM's can form a councilors' club in order to organize and participate in the debates and committees of the assembly. City councilors of two or more political parties and independents are allowed to form a joint club. Others are part of the mixed group.

== Organizational structure ==
Assembly is headed by a president and four deputy presidents who form the Presidency of the Assembly. The Secretariat of the Assembly is the professional Assembly service.

Permanent working bodies of the City Assembly are:

- Credentials Committee;
- Election and Appointment Committee;
- Statute, Rules of Procedure and Regulations Committee;
- Town, Street and Square Naming Committee;
- Economic Development Committee;
- Finance Committee;
- Utilities Management Committee;
- Physical Planning Committee;
- Committee for Environmental Protection;
- Agriculture, Forestry and Water Management Committee;
- Healthcare Committee;
- Social Welfare Committee;
- Education and Sports Committee;
- Culture Committee;
- Youth Committee;
- Intercity and International Cooperation Committee;
- Local Government Committee;
- Petitions and Appeals Committee.

== Political structure ==
The political groups represented in outgoing composition of the Assembly are:

Groups	No. of members per group
Možemo!-SDP	25 / 47
HDZ-DP-HSU-HSS	8 / 47
Marija Selak Raspudić-NL	7 / 47
Zagreb United	4 / 47
Jedino Hrvatska!	3 / 47
