= 2025 Zagreb local elections =

Local elections

- 18 May 2025; 1 June 2025 (runoff for mayor)
- Mayoral election
- Turnout: 42.65% (first round) ▼4.49 pp 34.67% (runoff) ▼10.04 pp
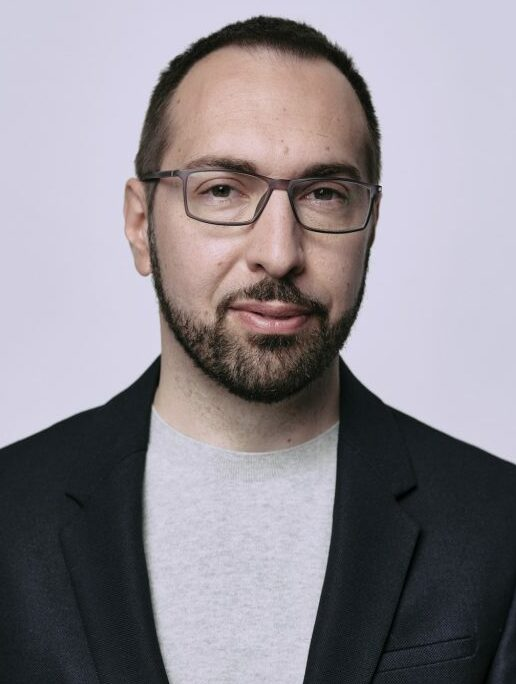

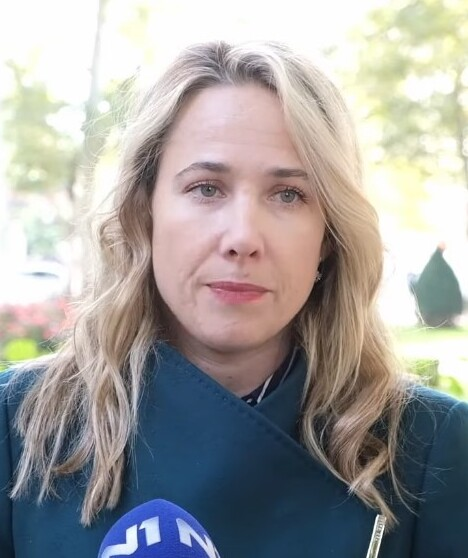
Candidate	Tomislav Tomašević	Marija Selak Raspudić
Party	We Can!	MSR-NL
Alliance	We Can! – SDP
First round	135,545; 47.59%	44,645; 15.67%
Runoff	130,996; 57.56%	96,590; 42.44%
Mayor before election
Tomislav Tomašević
We Can!
Elected mayor
Tomislav Tomašević
We Can!
- Assembly election
- All 47 seats in the Zagreb Assembly; 24 seats needed for a majority
Party	Leader	Vote %	Seats	+/–
We Can! – SDP	Tomislav Tomašević	43.66	25	−3
HDZ coalition	Mislav Herman	15.09	8	−3
Independent list of Marija Selak Raspudić	Marija Selak Raspudić	13.37	7	New
Zagreb United coalition	Davor Štern	7.20	4	+4
Only Croatia! coalition	Tomislav Jonjić	6.40	3	+3
This lists parties that won seats. See the complete results below.
Speaker before	Speaker after
Joško Klisović; SDP	Matej Mišić; SDP

Elections were held in Zagreb on 18 May 2025 for the 54th mayor of Zagreb, the two deputy mayors, the 47 members of the Zagreb Assembly, the councils of districts and the local committees, as part of the 2025 Croatian local elections. The runoff for the mayor was held on 1 June 2025.

== Background ==
As Zagreb, being the national capital, is the only Croatian city to enjoy a special status within Croatia's regional administrative framework (being both a city and a county), the mayor of Zagreb likewise also enjoys a status equal to that of a county prefect (Croatian: župan) of one of Croatia's other 20 counties (Croatian: županija). The city's county-level status is also highlighted in the name of its legislature, which is uniquely styled as a city assembly (Croatian: skupština; a term reserved for units with regional self-government, i.e. counties), and not as a city council (Croatian: vijeće; which is used for units with local self-government, i.e. cities and municipalities).

== Results ==
=== Mayoral election ===
Candidates		First round		Second round	
Candidate	Party	Votes	%	Votes	%
Tomislav Tomašević	We Can! – Social Democratic Party	135,545	47.59	130,996	56.57
Marija Selak Raspudić	Independent list of Marija Selak Raspudić	44,645	15.67	96,590	41.71
Mislav Herman	Croatian Democratic Union coalition	36,944	12.97		
Davor Bernardić	Zagreb United coalition	19,311	6.78		
Tomislav Jonjić	Only Croatia! coalition	18,344	6.44		
Ivica Lovrić	Blue City coalition	14,071	4.94		
Pavle Kalinić	Independent	10,944	3.84		
Total:		279,804	98.31	227,586	98.33
Invalid votes:		4,817	1.69	3,861	1.67
Uncast ballots:		171	–	104	–
Turnout:		284,792	42.65	231,551	34.67
Registered voters:		667,752		667.841	
The percentage of the vote for each candidate is calculated from the number of total ballots (including invalid, blank and uncast ballots); The percentages of valid and invalid votes are calculated from the number of total ballots, but excluding uncast ballots The turnout percentage is calculated from the number of registered voters
Source: First round Results

=== Assembly election ===
The Zagreb City Assembly has 47 members elected by proportional representation in a single city-wide electoral constituency. In order to qualify for legislative representation, a party or coalition must receive at least 5% of the number of valid votes cast in an election. The method used to distribute seats among such parties or coalitions is the D'Hondt method.

Party list	Previous seats	Votes	%	Seats	%	Seat change
We Can! Social Democratic Party of Croatia	28 / 47	121,999	43.66	25 / 47	53.19	▼3
Croatian Democratic Union; Homeland Movement; Croatian Party of Pensioners; Croatian Peasant Party	11 / 47	42,174	15.09	8 / 47	17.02	▼3
Independent list of Marija Selak Raspudić	0 / 47	37,361	13.37	7 / 47	14.89	New entry
Zagreb United; Independent List of Dina Dogan; Focus; Croatian People's Party - Liberal Democrats; Croatian Social Liberal Party; Social Democrats	0 / 47	20,133	7.20	4 / 47	8.51	▲4
Independent list of Tomislav Jonjić; Home and National Rally; Croatian Sovereignists; Bloc for Croatia	0 / 47	17,897	6.40	3 / 47	6.38	▲3
Bloc of Pensioners Together; Blue City	0 / 47	11,706	4.18	0 / 47	0.00	0
Independent list of Pavle Kalinić; Party of Pensioners; Pensioners together Zagorje Democratic Party	0 / 47	9,913	3.54	0 / 47	0.00	0
Dalija Orešković and People with a First and Last Name; Civic Liberal Alliance; Green Alternative - Sustainable Development of Croatia; People's Party - Reformists	0 / 47	7,151	2.55	0 / 47	0.00	0
The Bridge; Croatian Party of Rights; Republic	3 / 47	5,058	1.81	0 / 47	0.00	▼3
Law and Justice; Agramers – Independent List	0 / 47	2,395	0.85	0 / 47	0.00	0
Workers' Front	0 / 47	2,177	0.77	0 / 47	0.00	0
We Want Justice; Movement for a Modern Croatia	0 / 47	1.455	0.52	0 / 47	0.00	0
Total:		279.419	98.19	47	100%	0
Invalid votes:		5,145	1.81			
Turnout:		284,784	42.65			
Registered voters:		667,789				
The percentages of votes from each list are calculated from number of valid voters The percentages of valid and invalid votes are calculated from the turnout number The turnout percentage is calculated from the number of registered voters
Source: Results

== See also ==
- List of mayors in Croatia
- List of mayors of Zagreb
- 2025 Split local elections
- 2025 Rijeka local elections
- 2025 Osijek local elections
