= Tomislav Jonjić =

Croatian jurist, lawyer, historian, and politician

- Born: 19 May 1965 (age 61); Imotski, SR Croatia, Yugoslavia
- Citizenship: Croatian
- Education: Faculty of Law, Zagreb; Faculty of Croatian Studies, Zagreb
- Alma mater: University of Zagreb
- Occupations: jurist, lawyer, historian, diplomat
- Years active: 1988–present
- Employer(s): Ministry of Foreign Affairs; Ministry of the Interior; Croatian Institute of History
- Organisation(s): Matica hrvatska Croatian Society of Political Prisoners
- Notable work: Ivo Pilar: pisac, političar, ideolog (1898. – 1918.)
- Title: Member of the Zagreb Assembly
- Term: 2017–2021
- Political party: HSP (1990, 2024); NHR (2017–2019); BHR (2019–2021); NLTJ-JH (2025–present)
- Spouse: Mariana Ujević
- Children: 3
- Awards: Ljubica Štefan Award (2002)
- Website: https://tomislavjonjic.hr

Tomislav Jonjić (born 19 May 1965) is a Croatian jurist, lawyer, historian, politician and former diplomat. He is a research associate at the Croatian Institute of History.

== Biography ==
=== Early life and education ===
Jonjić was born in Imotski in 1965, where he graduated at the local gymnasium. He studied at the Faculty of Law in Zagreb (1984–1988), and obtained a doctorate in history at the Faculty of Croatian Studies in 2015. His doctoral advisor was Stjepan Matković.

=== Judicial career ===
From the end of 1992 to the end of 1995, he was a contract diplomat at the Embassy of the Republic of Croatia in Bern, and then for less than two years, he was an advisor for international relations at the Office for International Relations of the Ministry of the Interior (1995–1997). As the lead defense attorney, he participated in two proceedings at the International Criminal Tribunal for the former Yugoslavia (ICTY) in Hague.

=== Writings ===
Jonjić has been writing since 1990. He is a regular member of Matica hrvatska. Since 1997, he is an editor-in-chief of the journal Politički zatvorenik, published by Croatian Society of Political Prisoners. He is the author of 11 books, around fifty scientific and professional articles, and more than 2,000 newspaper articles. He is the editor of around fifteen books.

== Politics ==
From 2017 and its founding until July 2019, he was a member of the Independents for Croatia party, and a member of its presidency. In the 2017 local elections, he was elected as a representative in the Zagreb City Assembly. During his mandate, Jonjić participated in the work of the five Assembly's committees.

After a split with the party president Bruna Esih, Zlatko Hasanbegović left the party in July 2019 with the majority of the members of the presidency and founded the Bloc for Croatia party, whose presidency included Jonjić, who was also the president of the party's caucus in the Zagreb City Assembly. Before the 2021 local elections, he left the Bloc, "due to different views on national-political issues, elementary ethics and legality".

In February 2024, he rejoined the HSP. He announced his candidacy for the 2024 Croatian presidential election on the cover of Hrvatski tjednik magazine on 23 May 2024. His candidacy was publicly supported by 400 intellectuals. On December 10, Jonjić submitted more than 50,000 signatures for his candidacy to the State Election Commission. He won 82,727 (5.09%) of the votes. At the 2025 Zagreb local elections, he won 6.44% of the mayoral vote.

== Works ==
- Hrvatska vanjska politika: 1939. – 1942. [Croatian Foreign Policy 1939-1942], Libar, Zagreb, 2000.
- Hrvatska povijest [Croatian History], Naklada Bošković, Split, 2002^{1,2} (co-authors: Antun Dabinović, Rudolf Horvat, Lovre Katić, Ivan Mužić, Slavko Pavičić and Franjo Perše)
- Hrvatski nacionalizam i europske integracije [Croatian nationalism and European integrations], Naklada Trpimir, Zagreb, 2008.
- Nekoji nazori i zapovijedi sv. otaca papa glede nepravednog proganjanja Izraelićana, Naklada Trpimir, Zagreb, 2010. (editor)
- Iz korespondencije dr. Mile Budaka (1907. – 1944.), Croatian State Archives, Zagreb, 2012. (co-author Stjepan Matković)
- Antun Gustav Matoš: pod Starčevićevim barjakom, AGM, Zagreb, 2019.
- Ivo Pilar: pisac, političar, ideolog (1898. – 1918.), AGM, Zagreb, 2020.
- Hrvatska kronika. Minijature o hrvatskoj politici 1996.-2020, Naklada Trpimir, Zagreb, 2020.
- Sto knjiga i jedan film, Naklada Trpimir, Zagreb, 2020.
- Trgovci hrvatskim kožama. Polemike o nacionalnoj povijesti XX. stoljeća, Naklada Trpimir, Zagreb, 2021.
- Sateliti, lakaji & janjičari. Zagreb: Naklada Trpimir. 2021. ISBN 978-953-8220-06-7.
- Dnevnik čitanja. Ulomci za povijest plemenite vještine proizvodnje neprijatelja, Naklada Trpimir, Zagreb, 2021.

== Sources ==
- Dijanović, Davor (2024). "Razgovor s dr. sc. Tomislavom Jonjićem" [Interview with Tomislav Jonjić, PhD]. Obnova (in Croatian). 19 (1): 12–20. ISSN 1849-0697.
