= Niko Tokić Kartelo =

Croatian entrepreneur and politician (born 1966)

Personal details
- Born: 1966 (age 59–60) Zagreb, Croatia
- Party: Independent

Niko Tokić Kartelo (born Željko Tokić; Zagreb, 1966) is a Croatian entrepreneur and politician.

== Early life ==
Kartelo was born in Zagreb in 1966. His childhood was defined by his parents moving to work in Germany. Despite having aspirations of working in law, he dedicated himself to entrepreneurship early. Kartelo owns 3 companies. His companies employ around 100 workers, which includes foreigners. He got a significant amount of his working experience in Germany, while also working in exchange trading.

He is married, and the father of 2 daughters, and a grandfather to 4 grandchildren. He jointly manages family companies without hiring external managers. He changed his name from Željko Tokić to Niko Tokić Kartelo, adding both his father's name and mother's surname as a gesture of respect towards his parents.

== Political career ==
He has recently expressed an interest in the social and political system. He was a candidate for mayor in the 2021 Zagreb local election. He finished in 10th place with 0.39% of the vote.

He was a candidate for the Croatian presidency at the 2024 presidential election. with a key focus on three fields: "demographics and migration", "defense and national security", an "economic diplomacy". He stood for the reform of the political system towards greater personal responsibility. He managed to win around 11,800 votes, and 0.88% of the total vote in the election.
