= Drito (political party) =

Political party in Croatia

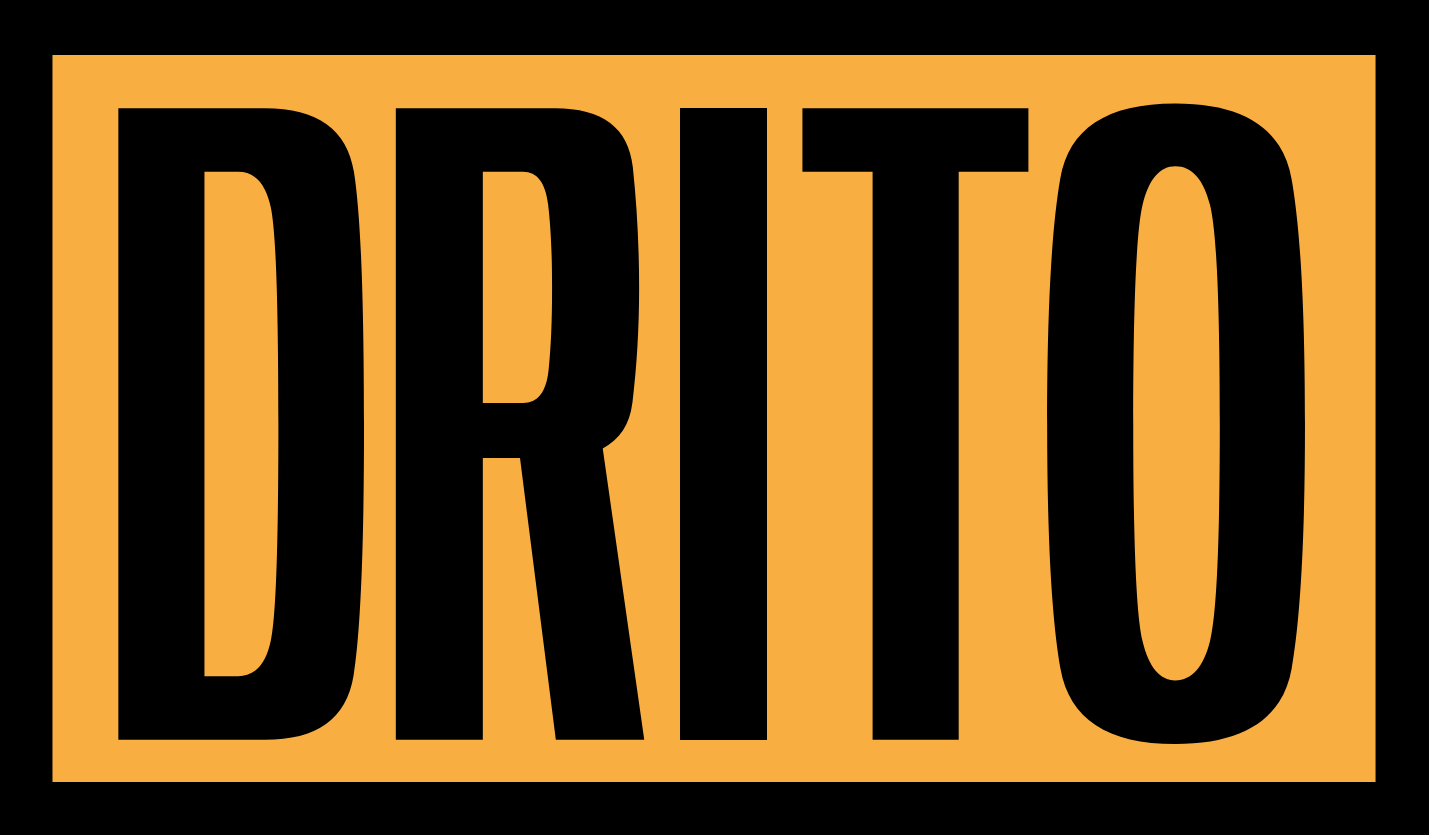
- President: Marija Selak Raspudić
- Founders: Marija Selak Raspudić; Nino Raspudić
- Founded: 12 March 2025; 19 months ago
- Headquarters: Palmotićeva ulica 24, Zagreb
- Political position: Centre (self-proclaimed)
- Colors: Orange
- Sabor: 2 / 151
- European Parliament: 0 / 12
- Zagreb Assembly: 6 / 47

Drito, previously known as Marija Selak Raspudić – Independent List, is a Croatian political party founded on 12 March 2025, whose president is Croatian Member of Parliament Marija Selak Raspudić. The party chose its new name on March 12, 2026, when its program was also presented at a press conference in Zagreb. It describes itself as centrist.

The party's core was formed around Marija Selak Raspudić and her husband, Member of Parliament Nino Raspudić. In the 2025 Zagreb local elections, the party won 7 seats in the Zagreb Assembly, but lost the second round of the mayoral election with its candidate, Marija Selak Raspudić, receiving 42.44% of the vote.

== History ==
Controversy was sparked following the party's name change to Drito, because the new name is shared by the Drito music festival. The party's posters in Zagreb were mistaken in public for the festival's promotional campaign. The record label yem, which has organized the festival since 2016, publicly distanced itself from the party. The word drito in Croatian comes from the Italian dritto (‘straight, upright’), and is considered a regionalism.

== Ideology ==
Drito is self-proclaimed centrist party with the stated aim of breaking the HDZ-SDP duopoly in Croatian politics. Nino Raspudić rejected Drito supporting the HDZ in the current cycle, but made inconclusive statements on the possibility following the next Croatian election. He dismissed the possibility of any coalition with SDP, and Možemo. In his view, the Second World War in Yugoslavia should be a less relevant theme in modern politics due to its remoteness, and that neither the Ustaše nor the Partisans had political legitimacy due to "never having won an election".
