= 2024 elections in the European Union =

- 2024
- European Parliament election
European Parliament election results map by member state, shaded by EP group popular vote winner
- National elections
National elections in the Member States
Parliamentary or Presidential election
No election

The 2024 elections in the European Union include European, national and regional elections in the EU member states.

== European Parliament election ==
The 2024 European Parliament election was held between 6 and 9 June 2024 to elect 720 members of the Tenth European Parliament.

=== Results ===
Political groups formed at the first plenary session on 16–19 July 2024: EPP (188) S&D (136) PfE (84) ECR (78) Renew (77) Greens/EFA (53) The Left (46) ESN (25) Non-Inscrits (32)

Affiliation to the parties at the time of the election on 6–9 June 2024.

Party	Seats	+/–
European People's Party	171	–6
Party of European Socialists	129	–7
European Conservatives and Reformists Party	58	+6
Alliance of Liberals and Democrats for Europe Party	58	–13
Identity and Democracy Party	57	–19
European Green Party	42	–12
Party of the European Left	29	+1
European Democratic Party	9	–1
European Free Alliance	7	0
Volt Europa	5	+4
European Christian Political Movement	4	0
European Communist Action	2	0
Animal Politics EU	2	–1
European Pirate Party	1	–3
Others	146	+36
Total	720	+15 (Note: with respect of 705 seats in 2019)
Source: European Parliament Election 2024 Europe Elects

== National elections ==
=== Parliamentary elections ===
Member state	Election	Parliament before	Head of Government before	Party	EU Party	Parliament after	Head of Government after	Party	EU Party
Portugal	10 March		Antonio Costa	PS	PES		Luís Montenegro	PSD	EPP
Croatia	17 April		Andrej Plenković	HDZ	EPP		Andrej Plenković	HDZ	EPP
Belgium	9 June		Alexander De Croo	Open Vld	ALDE		Bart De Wever	N-VA	EFA (Note: The New Flemish Alliance sits in the European Conservatives and Reformists Group in the European Parliament.)
Bulgaria	9 June		Dimitar Glavchev (caretaker)	Ind.	Ind.		Dimitar Glavchev (caretaker)	Ind.	Ind.
France	30 June; 7 July		Gabriel Attal	RE	Ind. (Note: Renaissance is in the Renew Europe group of the European Parliament, but does not belong to any European party.)		Michel Barnier	LR	EPP
Czech Republic (senate only)	20–21 September; 27–28 September		Petr Fiala	ODS	ECR		Petr Fiala	ODS	ECR
Austria	29 September		Karl Nehammer	ÖVP	EPP		Christian Stocker	ÖVP	EPP
Lithuania	13 October		Ingrida Šimonytė	TS-LKD	EPP		Gintautas Paluckas	LSDP	PES
Bulgaria	27 October		Dimitar Glavchev (caretaker)	Ind.	Ind.		Rosen Zhelyazkov	GERB	EPP
Ireland	29 November		Simon Harris	Fine Gael	EPP		Micheál Martin	Fianna Fáil	ALDE
Romania	1 December		Marcel Ciolacu	PSD	PES		Marcel Ciolacu	PSD	PES

=== Presidential elections ===
Member state	Election	President before	Party	EU Party	President after	Party	EU Party
Lithuania	12 May; 26 May	Gitanas Nausėda	Ind.	Ind.	Gitanas Nausėda	Ind.	Ind.
Romania	24 November	Klaus Iohannis	PNL	EPP	First round annulled due to alleged Russian meddling, second round cancelled, with new elections in 2025.		

=== Presidential elections in parliamentary states ===
Member state	Election	President before	Party	EU Party	President after	Party	EU Party
Finland	28 January; 11 February	Sauli Niinistö	National Coalition	EPP	Alexander Stubb	National Coalition	EPP
Hungary	26 February	László Kövér (acting)	Fidesz	Ind. (Note: Fidesz did not belong to any European party until September of this year.)	Tamás Sulyok	Ind.	Ind.
Slovakia	23 March; 6 April	Zuzana Čaputová	PS	ALDE	Peter Pellegrini	Hlas	PES (suspended)
Malta	27 March	George Vella	Labour	PES	Myriam Spiteri Debono	Labour	PES
Croatia	29 December; 12 January 2025	Zoran Milanović	SDP	PES	Zoran Milanović	SDP	PES

== Referendums ==
- 2024 Irish constitutional referendums, 8 March
- 2024 Lithuanian constitutional referendum, 12 May
- 2024 Slovenian referendum, 9 June

== Regional elections ==
=== Austria ===
- 2024 Vorarlberg state election, 13 October
- 2024 Styrian state election, 24 November

=== Belgium ===
All three regions held elections on 9 June, also indirectly determining the composition of the Senate.

=== Czech Republic ===
All thirteen regions held elections on 20 and 21 September.

=== Germany ===
- 2024 Saxony state election, 1 September
- 2024 Thuringian state election, 1 September
- 2024 Brandenburg state election, 22 September

=== Hungary ===
All nineteen counties and Budapest held elections on 9 June.

=== Italy ===
Seven regions held elections in February, March, April, June, October and November.

=== Ireland ===
All 31 local authorities held elections on 7 June.

=== Poland ===
All sixteen provinces held elections on 7 April.

=== Portugal ===
- 2024 Azorean regional election, 4 February
- 2024 Madeiran regional election, 26 May

=== Spain ===
- 2024 Galician regional election, 18 February
- 2024 Basque regional election, 21 April
- 2024 Catalan regional election, 12 May
