= 2024–25 Croatian presidential election =

- 29 December 2024 (first round); 12 January 2025 (second round)
- Turnout: 46.01% (first round) ▼5.17pp 44.17% (second round) ▼10.82pp
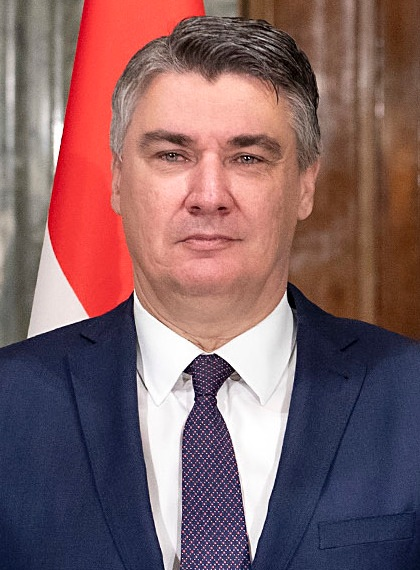

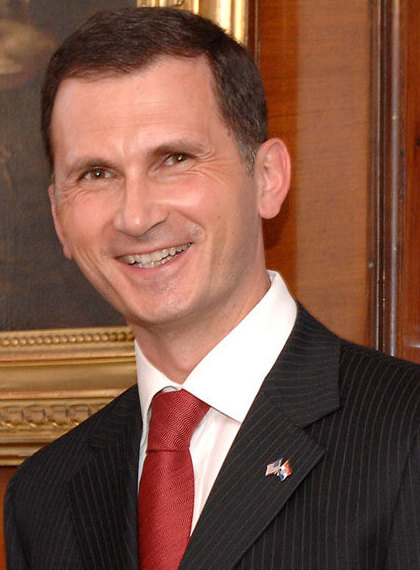
| Nominee | Zoran Milanović | Dragan Primorac |
| Party | Independent (Note: Endorsed by the SDP, HSS, NS-R, NPS, SU, BUZ, Centre, IDS, DO i SIP, Glas and MDS) (Note: Milanović was elected in the 2019–20 election as the candidate of the SDP. However, under Article 96 of the Constitution of Croatia, sitting presidents are prohibited from holding party memberships for the duration of their term. As a result, he stood as an independent candidate, with informal SDP affiliation.) | Independent (Note: Endorsed by the HDZ, HSU, HDS, DP, HSLS and HNS) |
| Popular vote | 1,122,859 | 380,752 |
| Percentage | 74.68% | 25.32% |
President before election
Zoran Milanović
Independent
Elected President
Zoran Milanović
Independent

Presidential elections were held in Croatia on 29 December 2024, with a second round held on 12 January 2025 after no candidate received a majority of the vote in the first round. Incumbent president Zoran Milanović was eligible for a second term, and was re-elected with a record 75% of the vote.

== Background ==
Voters in Croatia had also voted for the Croatian Parliament in April and European Parliament in June.

The first round was planned for December 2024 but on 15 March 2024 incumbent president Zoran Milanović announced he would run as a candidate of the Social Democratic Party of Croatia (SDP) for the position of prime minister. During this press conference, he also revealed he would tend his resignation as the president only in case of a parliamentary election victory on 17 April 2024. Had Milanović become prime minister, the constitution required that a preliminary presidential election taking place no later than 16 June 2024. However, the SDP-led Rivers of Justice coalition won only 42 seats in the election and the HDZ won a vote of confidence after securing the backing of minority representatives and several MPs from the Homeland Movement, with Milanović continuing as president.

On 20 November 2024, Prime Minister Andrej Plenković announced that the presidential election would be held on 29 December, which was approved by the Croatian Parliament on 21 November.

The leadup to the election was marred by several controversies, including the November arrest and subsequent dismissal of Minister of Health Vili Beroš on various corruption-related charges. This caused a standoff between Croatian law enforcement agency USKOK and the European Public Prosecutor's Office, one of whose investigations was blown by the arrest. Attorney General of Croatia Ivan Turudić ruled that USKOK would continue the investigation using the evidence collected by EPPO. Milanović criticised this decision. Another controversy happened around the same time when Milanović vetoed the government's proposal to involve Croatia in a NATO operation training Ukrainian soldiers. The parliament did not attempt to overrule his veto.

== Electoral system ==
The president of Croatia is directly elected by secret ballot to a term of five years using the two-round system, with presidents limited to two full terms in office. The constitution requires that a presidential election be held no sooner than 60 days and no later than 30 days before the expiration of the incumbent president's term. An absolute majority (50% + 1 vote) of all votes cast (including invalid, blank and uncast ballots) is required to win in the first round. If no candidate receives a majority of the vote, a second-round is to be held fourteen days later, with the two candidates with the highest number of votes in the first round taking part. The candidate who receives the highest number of votes in the second round (a majority of valid votes cast) is declared the winner. If one of the candidates who has qualified for the second round were to withdraw their candidacy or die, the candidate with the next highest number of votes in the first round takes their place in the second round.

In order for a potential candidate to be allowed to contest the elections and have their name placed on the ballot, they must gather at least 10,000 signatures from eligible voters, with every signatory being permitted to give their signature to only one potential candidate. The timeframe for collecting the said number of signatures is set at twelve days, and after the expiry of this period potential candidates must submit them to the State Electoral Commission for verification.

== Candidates ==
On 11 December, the State Electoral Commission published a list of eight candidates.

| Candidate | Party affiliation | Political remarks | Proof of nomination |
|---|---|---|---|
| Miro Bulj | Most | Incumbent MP for electoral district IX (since 2015) and mayor of Sinj. Co-endorsed also by Croatian Sovereignists (HS). He ran on a national conservative and anti-immigration platform. His bid was announced on 8 October 2024. | Submitted undisclosed number of signatures on 6 December. |
| Tomislav Jonjić | Independent | Lawyer, jurist, and publicist. Although formally independent, he is a member of the Croatian Party of Rights (HSP). Co-endorsed also by Croatian Sovereignists (HS). His bid was announced on 23 May 2024. | Submitted undisclosed number of signatures on 10 December. |
| Ivana Kekin | Možemo! | Incumbent MP for electoral district I. She ran on a green left and progressive platform. Her bid was announced on 10 September 2024. | Submitted some 18,000 signatures on 10 December. |
| Branka Lozo | DOMiNO | Professor at the University of Zagreb. Co-endorsed by Croatian Sovereignists (HS). She ran on a right-wing and nationalist platform. Her bid was announced on 28 September. | Submitted undisclosed number of signatures on 10 December. |
| Zoran Milanović | Independent | Incumbent President of Croatia since 2020. Milanović stood for re-election to a second and final term. Although formally independent, he was nominated by the biggest opposition party, the Social Democratic Party (SDP) and by 9 other centre-left and liberal parties (NPS, Centre, HSS, DO i SIP, NS-R, GLAS, Pensioners' interests SU, and BUZ, and regionalist MDS). Former Prime Minister of Croatia (2011–2016) and the president of SDP (2007–2016). His bid was announced on 26 June 2024. | Submitted 45,833 signatures on 3 December. |
| Dragan Primorac | Independent | Although formally independent, he was nominated by the ruling Croatian Democratic Union (HDZ) and is supported by 6 other centrist to right-wing parties (Homeland Movement, HSU, HDS, HSLS, HNS, and Nezavisni). Former Minister of Science, Education and Sports (2003–2009) and a presidential candidate in the 2009 election. His bid was announced on 30 July 2024. | Submitted 109,505 signatures on 4 December. |
| Marija Selak Raspudić | Independent | Incumbent MP for electoral district I, elected on Most electoral list in April 2024. She ran on a conservative platform. Her bid was announced on 22 July 2024. | Submitted undisclosed number of signatures on 9 December. |
| Niko Tokić Kartelo | Independent | Businessman. His bid was announced on 2 August 2024. | Submitted some 11,800 signatures on 9 December. |

=== Failed candidacies ===
These individuals failed to submit the required number of endorsement signatures.

- Dražen Keleminec (A-HSP), Incumbent president of Autochthonous Croatian Party of Rights (A-HSP) since 2005. His bid was announced on 21 September 2024. Submitted 10,932 on 10 December. On 11 December, his bid was rejected by the State Electoral Commission because he failed to submit the required number of endorsement signatures. Only 7,712 signatures were verified as authentic.
- Slobodan Midžić (independent), a potential perennial candidate who submitted just one signature of endorsement on 9 December. On 11 December, his bid was rejected by the State Electoral Commission because he failed to submit the required number of endorsement signatures. He had previously unsuccessfully attempted to become a candidate in 2009, 2014, and 2019 elections.
- Pavle Perović (independent). His bid was announced on 13 November 2024.
- Dražen Pilić (independent), president of Cultural-Sports Veterans' Association. His bid was announced on 20 October 2024.
- Karolina Vidović Krišto (OiP), Journalist and former MP for electoral district IX (2020–2024). Her bid was announced on 26 November 2024. Submitted some 11,000 signatures on 10 December. On 11 December, her bid was rejected by the State Electoral Commission because she failed to submit the required number of endorsement signatures. Only 8,084 signatures were verified as authentic.

=== Withdrawn bids ===
- Anton Filić (independent), former journalist of Večernji list and former president of the Union of Croatian Journalists. His bid was announced on 11 November 2024. He withdrew on 8 December.
- Ava Karabatić (independent), model and television personality. Her bid was announced on 23 November 2024. She withdrew on 5 December.
- Mislav Kolakušić (PiP), former MEP (2019–2024), presidential candidate in the 2019 election. His bid was announced on 23 April 2024. He withdrew on 10 December.
- Aurora Weiss (independent), journalist. Her bid was announced on 11 September 2024. She withdrew on 10 December.

== Campaign ==
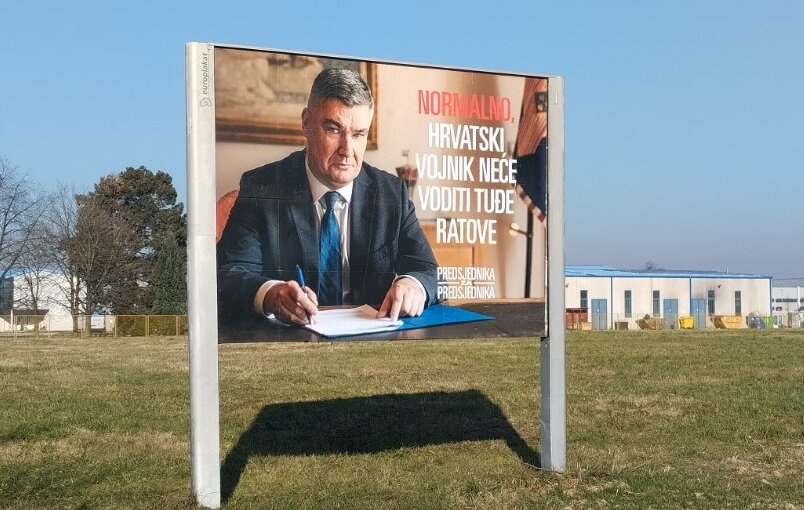
Milanović's campaign poster with a message: "Normally – the Croatian soldier will not wage wars of others'."

The incumbent, Zoran Milanović, ran on an anti-corruption campaign, opposing social inequality and growing inflation, which he attributed to policies of the HDZ government. He said that his key values are "the rule of law, right to equality, personal freedoms and rights of minorities". On foreign policy, Milanović said he would "keep Croatia outside global conflicts," and that the country must "retain the right to independent decisions about its national interests". Milanović said he would not slow former Yugoslav countries' accession to the EU.

Dragan Primorac ran on a campaign of co-operation with the HDZ government. He said he would "return civility ... particularly to political and public spheres of life" and that "the military is always above politics", and he offered "unconditional adherence" to "Western values" and the NATO alliance. Primorac's campaign was conservative on regional issues. He promised to "offer special attention to the rights" of Croats in Bosnia and Herzegovina, and prevent Serbia from joining the EU unless it provided Croatia with access to archives containing information about mass graves from the Croatian War of Independence (1991–1995).

Neither Primorac nor Milanović led an active campaign. Milanović attended only a single debate, on 23 December, during the first round of the elections, but his ratings remained high due to the popularity of his presidency. According to political analysts, both Milanović and Primorac expected to enter the second round regardless of their campaigns.

Marija Selak Raspudić campaigned on a platform that included economic problems, population decline and corruption. Ivana Kekin campaigned against Dragan Primorac and the HDZ, accusing them of corruption in the healthcare sector. On 7 December a group of Croatian veterans from Imotski held a peaceful protest at the Vinjani Donji–Gorica border crossing against what they claimed was a "media blockade of candidate Tomislav Jonjić".

In the first round Primorac trailed Milanović by 30 percentage points. In the only debate of the second round debate, on 7 January, both candidates turned to insults. Milanović accused Primorac of being "totally illiterate", while Primorac called Milanović a "pro-Russian puppet" who "divided" Croatia. On the same day, the Jutarnji list newspaper prematurely ended an online election poll after receiving 25,000 votes tipping the scale to Primorac in a short timespan from US-based internet addresses. In the wake of the debate, the Centre for Information Resilience, a UK-based organisation, published a report alleging that "pro-Russian, anti-EU, and anti-NATO bot networks" promoting Milanović on several social media networks were attempting to influence elections. However, the Večernji list national newspaper managed to contact the owner of one of the Facebook accounts singled out in the report. The account turned out to belong to a real person, a Facebook activist from Dugo Selo near Zagreb. Social media networks X and TikTok both denied the allegations; TikTok reported removing a different bot network promoting Primorac.

== Opinion polls ==
=== First round ===
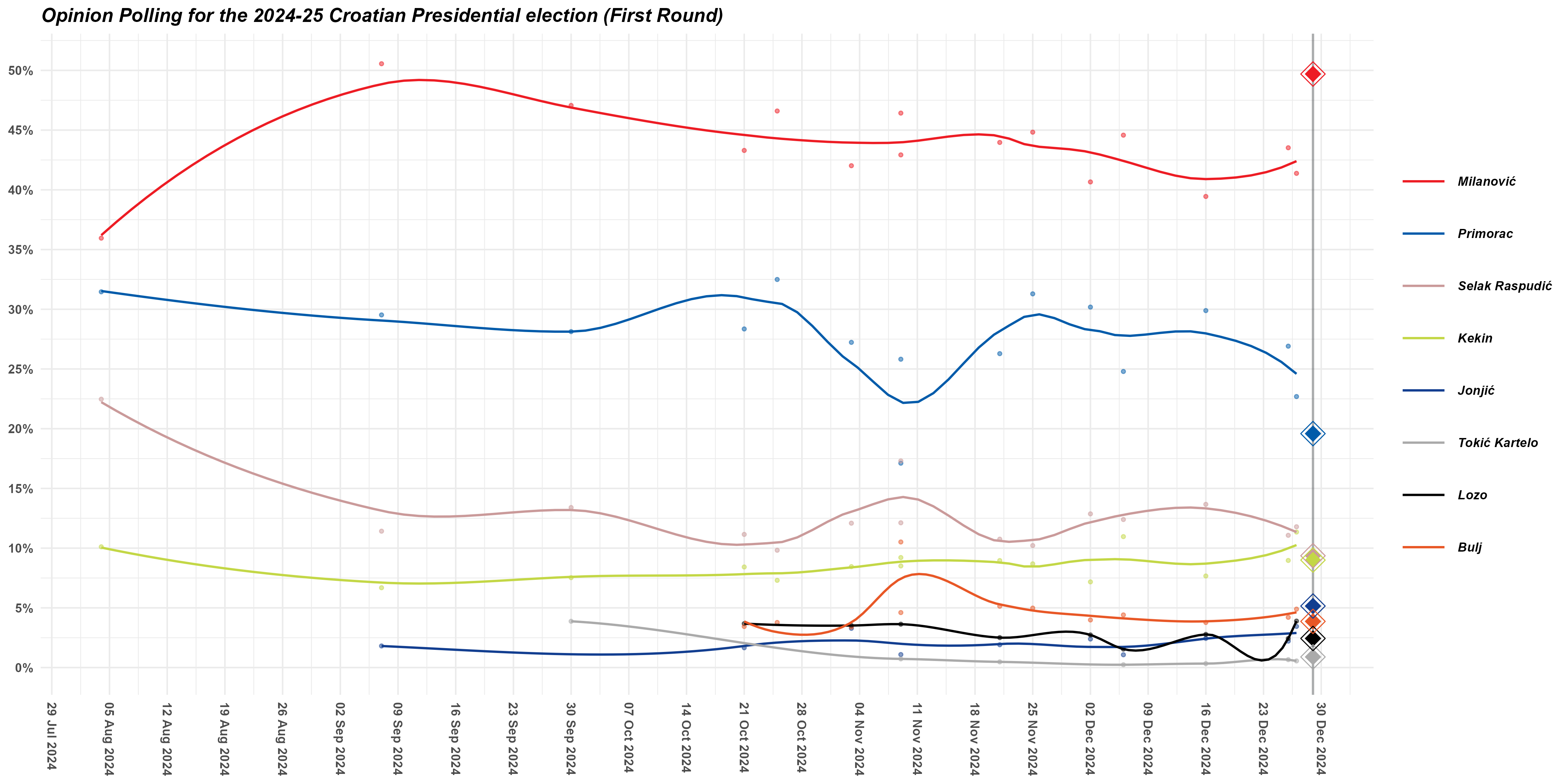

| Date | Polling Firm | Milanović | Primorac | Stier | Selak Raspudić | Kekin | Kolakušić | Jonjić | Weiss | Tokić Kartelo | Keleminec | Lozo | Bulj | Petrov | Penava | Undecided / none | Lead |
|---|---|---|---|---|---|---|---|---|---|---|---|---|---|---|---|---|---|
| 29 Dec 2024 | Results | 49.09 | 19.35 | – | 9.25 | 8.89 | – | 5.09 | – | 0.88 | – | 2.41 | 3.82 | – | – | 1.16 (Note: invalid/blank votes) | 29.74 |
| 27 Dec 2024 | IPSOS | 37.2 | 20.4 | – | 10.6 | 10.2 | – | 3.1 | – | 0.5 | – | 3.5 | 4.4 | – | – | 10.1 | 16.8 |
| 26 Dec 2024 | Promocija Plus | 39.3 | 24.3 | – | 10.0 | 8.1 | – | 2.0 | – | 0.6 | – | 2.2 | 3.8 | – | – | 9.8 | 15.0 |
| 16 Dec 2024 | 2X1 komunikacije | 35.5 | 26.9 | – | 12.3 | 6.9 | – | 2.2 | – | 0.3 | – | 2.5 | 3.4 | – | – | 9.8 | 8.6 |
| 6 Dec 2024 | Promocija plus | 37.4 | 20.8 | – | 10.4 | 9.2 | 1.6 | 0.9 | 0.6 | 0.2 | 0.1 | 1.3 | 3.7 | – | – | 12 | 16.6 |
| 2 Dec 2024 | 2X1 komunikacije | 35.7 | 26.5 | – | 11.3 | 6.3 | – | 2.1 | – | – | – | 2.4 | 3.5 | – | – | 10.5 | 9.2 |
| 25 Nov 2024 | IPSOS | 35.1 | 24.5 | – | 8.0 | 6.8 | – | – | – | – | – | – | 3.9 | – | – | 13.4 | 10.6 |
| 21 Nov 2024 | Promocija plus | 36.8 | 22.0 | – | 9.0 | 7.5 | 1.5 | 1.6 | 0.2 | 0.4 | 0.3 | 2.1 | 4.3 | – | – | 14.1 | 14.8 |
| 9 Nov 2024 | Promocija plus | 38.3 | 21.3 | – | 10.0 | 7.6 | 1.1 | 0.9 | 1.3 | 0.6 | 0.6 | – | 3.8 | – | – | 14.4 | 17.0 |
| 3 Nov 2024 | 2X1 komunikacije | 35.8 | 23.2 | – | 10.3 | 7.2 | 1.9 | 2.8 | – | – | – | 3.0 | 2.9 | – | – | – | 13.5 |
| 25 Oct 2024 | IPSOS | 37.0 | 25.8 | – | 7.8 | 5.8 | 3.3 | – | – | – | – | – | 3.0 | – | – | 14.4 | 11.2 |
| 21 Oct 2024 | Promocija plus | 36.5 | 23.9 | – | 9.4 | 7.1 | 1.6 | 1.4 | 0.4 | – | 0.4 | 3.1 | 2.9 | – | – | 12.1 | 12.6 |
| 30 Sep 2024 | 2X1 komunikacije | 42.5 | 25.4 | – | 12.1 | 6.8 | – | 3.5 | – | – | – | – | – | – | – | 8.9 | 17.1 |
| 7 Sep 2024 | Promocija plus | 36.3 | 21.2 | – | 8.2 | 4.8 | 1.2 | 1.3 | – | – | – | – | – | 4.6 | 4.3 | 15.5 | 15.1 |
| 4 Aug 2024 | IPSOS | 32.0 | 28.0 | – | 20.0 | 9.0 | – | – | – | – | – | – | – | – | – | 13.0 | 4.0 |
| 6 Jul 2024 | Promocija plus | 35.9 | 7.7 | 15.4 | 7.3 | 5.9 | 2.4 | – | – | – | – | – | – | 4.0 | 5.7 | 12.0 | 20.5 |

=== Second round ===
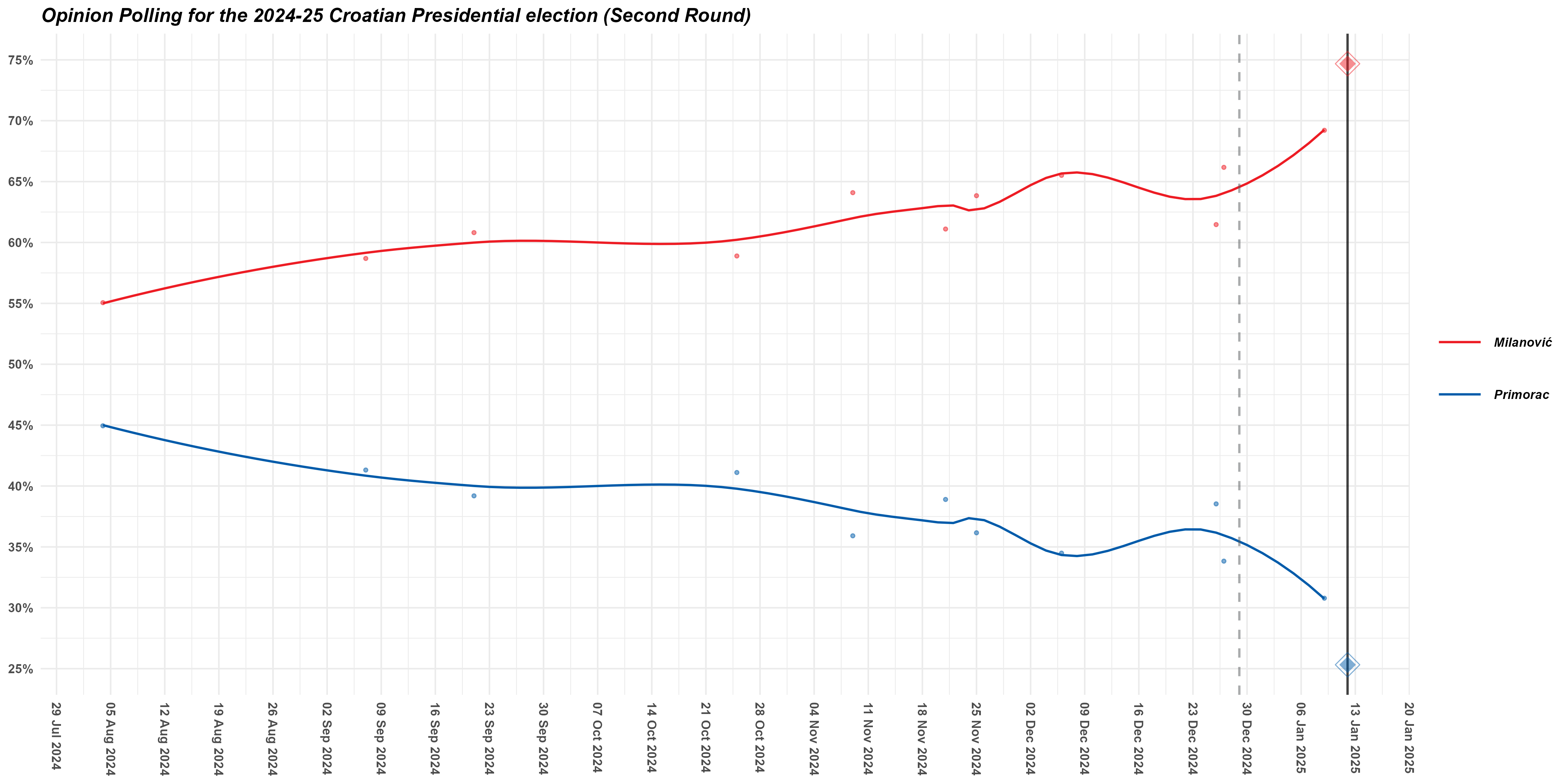

==== Milanović vs Primorac ====
| Date | Polling Firm | Milanović | Primorac | Undecided / none | Lead |
|---|---|---|---|---|---|
| 12 Jan 2025 | Results | 74.68 | 25.32 | 3.67 | 49.36 |
| 9 Jan 2025 | Promocija plus | 62.5 | 27.8 | 9.7 | 34.7 |
| 27 Dec 2024 | IPSOS | 57.7 | 29.5 | 7.8 | 28.2 |
| 26 Dec 2024 | Promocija plus | 54.4 | 34.1 | 6.9 | 20.3 |
| 6 Dec 2024 | Promocija plus | 54.9 | 28.9 | 16.2 | 26.0 |
| 25 Nov 2024 | IPSOS | 53.5 | 30.3 | 10.0 | 23.2 |
| 21 Nov 2024 | Promocija plus | 52.0 | 33.1 | 7.7 | 18.9 |
| 9 Nov 2024 | Promocija plus | 53.9 | 30.2 | 8.0 | 23.7 |
| 25 Oct 2024 | IPSOS PULS | 51.0 | 35.6 | 8.8 | 15.4 |
| 21 Sep 2024 | Promocija plus | 52.6 | 33.9 | 7.4 | 18.7 |
| 7 Sep 2024 | Promocija plus | 48.3 | 34.0 | 10.3 | 14.3 |
| 4 Aug 2024 | IPSOS | 49.0 | 40.0 | 11.0 | 9.0 |

==== Milanović vs Stier ====
| Date | Polling Firm | Milanović | Stier | Undecided / none | Lead |
|---|---|---|---|---|---|
| 6 Jul 2024 | Promocija plus | 54.2 | 31.6 | 8.6 | 22.6 |

==== Milanović vs Selak Raspudić ====
| Date | Polling Firm | Milanović | Selak Raspudić | Undecided / none | Lead |
|---|---|---|---|---|---|
| 26 Dec 2024 | Promocija plus | 48.7 | 35.1 | 10.4 | 13.6 |
| 25 Nov 2024 | IPSOS PULS | 47.7 | 31.9 | 13.4 | 15.8 |
| 25 Oct 2024 | IPSOS PULS | 50.0 | 28.5 | 11.0 | 21.5 |

==== Selak Raspudić vs Primorac ====
| Date | Polling Firm | Selak Raspudić | Primorac | Undecided / none | Lead |
|---|---|---|---|---|---|
| 25 Nov 2024 | IPSOS PULS | 45.7 | 29.6 | 14.0 | 16.1 |
| 25 Oct 2024 | IPSOS PULS | 38.1 | 35.3 | 15.3 | 2.8 |

== Results ==
Incumbent president Zoran Milanović won a second term in office with 75% of the vote, the highest for a presidential candidate in Croatia, not counting president Franjo Tuđman's first round victories in 1992 and 1997.

According to political analysts, HDZ likely expected Primorac to win 30–40% of the second-round vote after only winning 19% in the first round; however, Milanović likely attracted a number of HDZ voters. The results of the second round were taken as a sign of a small loyal voter base for the HDZ, since the large point difference in the first round likely demotivated voters. Some blamed Primorac's low vote count on a poor choice of candidate by the HDZ or the choice to initially campaign as an independent candidate before the formal HDZ endorsement. Primorac and Prime Minister Andrej Plenković caused a minor controversy by not congratulating Milanović in their election night speeches; though former president Kolinda Grabar-Kitarović and Archbishop of Zagreb Dražen Kutleša both congratulated him afterward.

| Candidate | Party | First round | | Second round | |
| Candidate | Party | Votes | % | Votes | % |
|---|---|---|---|---|---|
| Zoran Milanović | Independent (Social Democratic Party) | 797,938 | 49.68 | 1,122,859 | 74.68 |
| Dragan Primorac | Independent (Croatian Democratic Union) | 314,663 | 19.59 | 380,752 | 25.32 |
| Marija Selak Raspudić | Independent | 150,435 | 9.37 | | |
| Ivana Kekin | We can! | 144,533 | 9.00 | | |
| Tomislav Jonjić | Independent (Croatian Party of Rights) | 82,787 | 5.15 | | |
| Miro Bulj | The Bridge | 62,127 | 3.87 | | |
| Branka Lozo | Home and National Rally | 39,321 | 2.45 | | |
| Niko Tokić Kartelo | Independent | 14,409 | 0.90 | | |
| Total | | 1,606,213 | 100.00 | 1,503,611 | 100.00 |
| Valid votes | | 1,606,213 | 98.84 | 1,503,611 | 96.33 |
| Invalid/blank votes | | 18,786 | 1.16 | 57,209 | 3.67 |
| Total votes | | 1,624,999 | 100.00 | 1,560,820 | 100.00 |
| Registered voters/turnout | | 3,531,622 | 46.01 | 3,533,441 | 44.17 |
Source: izbori.hr, izbori.hr

The State Election Commission announced that the total cost of holding the elections was 14.285 million euros.

=== Results by county ===
==== First Round ====
| County | Zoran Milanović (%) | Dragan Primorac (%) | Marija Selak Raspudić (%) | Ivana Kekin (%) | Tomislav Jonjić (%) | Miro Bulj (%) | Branka Lozo (%) | Niko Tokić Kartelo (%) |
|---|---|---|---|---|---|---|---|---|
| Zagreb | 51.87 | 17.02 | 10.15 | 8.65 | 4.12 | 3.21 | 2.82 | 1.01 |
| Krapina-Zagorje | 60.97 | 16.07 | 7.66 | 7.59 | 1.81 | 1.89 | 2.03 | 0.87 |
| Sisak-Moslavina | 47.36 | 25.97 | 8.17 | 6.85 | 3.33 | 3.65 | 2.30 | 0.98 |
| Karlovac | 47.21 | 25.37 | 8.71 | 6.98 | 3.25 | 3.52 | 2.89 | 0.87 |
| Varaždin | 62.40 | 15.31 | 7.38 | 9.00 | 1.47 | 1.65 | 1.10 | 0.70 |
| Koprivnica-Križevci | 55.68 | 18.31 | 9.24 | 8.61 | 1.89 | 2.34 | 2.02 | 0.72 |
| Bjelovar-Bilogora | 52.01 | 21.97 | 8.83 | 6.56 | 2.84 | 3.45 | 2.36 | 0.88 |
| Primorje-Gorski Kotar | 55.03 | 14.25 | 9.12 | 11.89 | 2.81 | 3.28 | 1.55 | 0.98 |
| Lika-Senj | 39.96 | 34.82 | 6.28 | 4.25 | 5.46 | 5.25 | 1.84 | 0.78 |
| Virovitica-Podravina | 48.49 | 28.89 | 7.36 | 5.97 | 2.39 | 3.03 | 1.77 | 0.81 |
| Požega-Slavonia | 44.52 | 28.34 | 9.01 | 6.02 | 3.77 | 3.97 | 2.09 | 0.93 |
| Brod-Posavina | 43.98 | 28.36 | 9.15 | 5.84 | 3.95 | 3.94 | 2.37 | 0.89 |
| Zadar | 42.23 | 24.97 | 8.62 | 6.74 | 6.23 | 6.26 | 2.71 | 0.88 |
| Osijek-Baranja | 46.68 | 23.88 | 9.27 | 7.53 | 3.89 | 3.10 | 3.37 | 0.92 |
| Šibenik-Knin | 42.32 | 24.49 | 8.27 | 6.28 | 6.36 | 6.90 | 3.05 | 1.06 |
| Vukovar-Srijem | 42.78 | 26.81 | 8.73 | 5.16 | 5.25 | 4.34 | 4.25 | 1.01 |
| Split-Dalmatia | 38.94 | 20.45 | 9.15 | 6.33 | 12.44 | 8.10 | 2.60 | 0.64 |
| Istria | 67.07 | 8.18 | 6.16 | 12.32 | 1.68 | 2.04 | 0.76 | 0.78 |
| Dubrovnik-Neretva | 41.62 | 26.66 | 8.56 | 6.43 | 6.23 | 6.03 | 2.06 | 0.77 |
| Međimurje | 66.97 | 11.52 | 6.80 | 9.54 | 1.07 | 1.54 | 1.19 | 0.75 |
| City of Zagreb | 48.05 | 13.21 | 11.94 | 13.02 | 6.05 | 2.83 | 2.65 | 1.02 |

==== Second Round ====
| County | Zoran Milanović (%) | Dragan Primorac (%) |
|---|---|---|
| Zagreb | 78.18 | 21.82 |
| Krapina-Zagorje | 81.78 | 18.22 |
| Sisak-Moslavina | 69.66 | 30.34 |
| Karlovac | 69.57 | 30.43 |
| Varaždin | 83.50 | 16.50 |
| Koprivnica-Križevci | 79.27 | 20.73 |
| Bjelovar-Bilogora | 74.37 | 25.63 |
| Primorje-Gorski Kotar | 82.26 | 17.74 |
| Lika-Senj | 58.10 | 41.90 |
| Virovitica-Podravina | 66.99 | 33.01 |
| Požega-Slavonia | 65.65 | 34.35 |
| Brod-Posavina | 64.92 | 35.08 |
| Zadar | 66.76 | 33.24 |
| Osijek-Baranja | 70.10 | 29.90 |
| Šibenik-Knin | 66.52 | 33.48 |
| Vukovar-Srijem | 65.28 | 34.72 |
| Split-Dalmatia | 66.91 | 33.09 |
| Istria | 90.23 | 9.77 |
| Dubrovnik-Neretva | 65.10 | 34.90 |
| Međimurje | 87.17 | 12.83 |
| City of Zagreb | 79.50 | 20.50 |

== See also ==
- 2024 elections in the European Union
- 2024 European Parliament election in Croatia
- 2024 Croatian parliamentary election
