= Electoral district I (Croatian Parliament) =

- Constituency for the Croatian Parliament
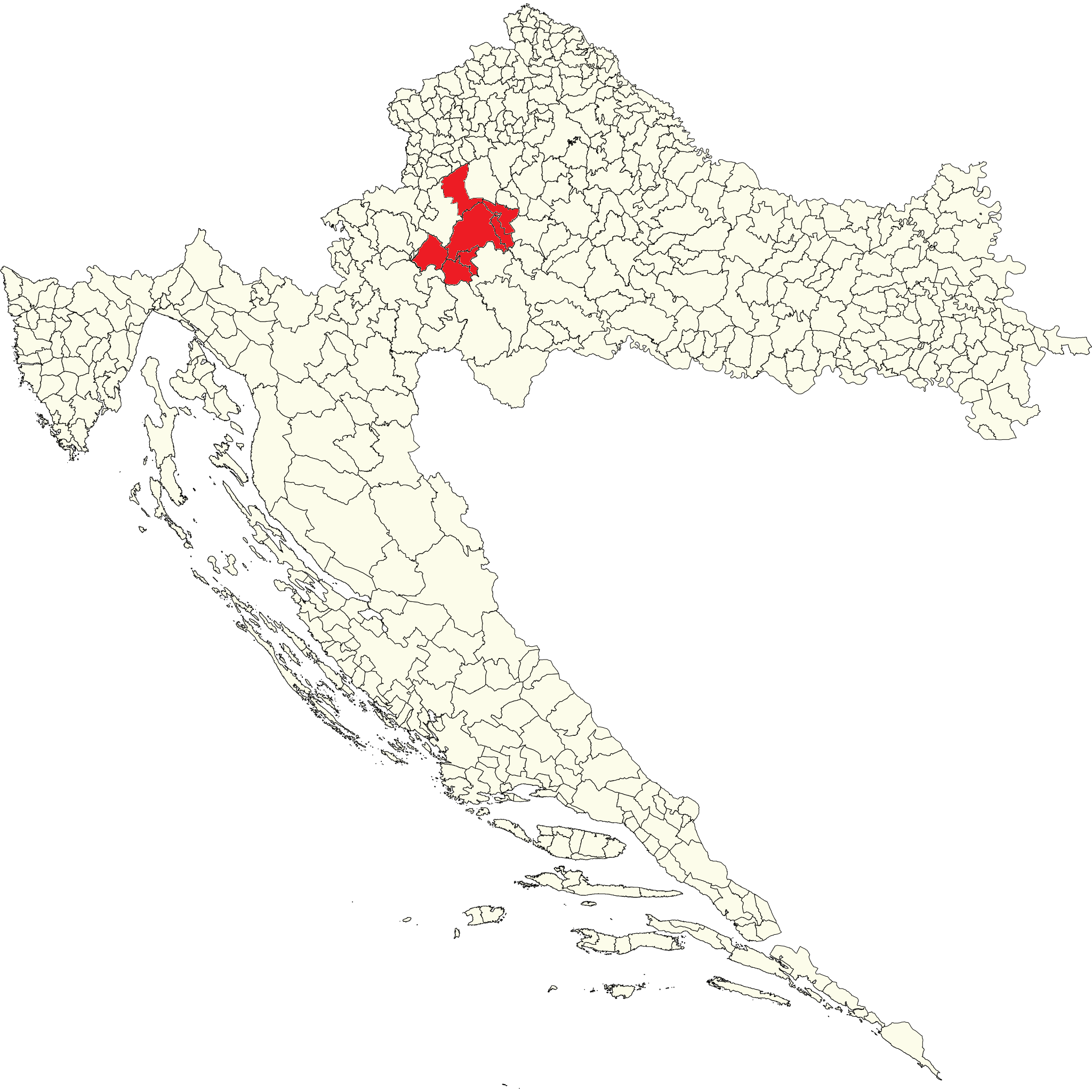
- Map of Electoral district I (2023-present)
- Electorate: 353,009 (2025)
- Major settlements: Zagreb, Velika Gorica

Current constituency
- Created: 2023
- Number of members: 14

Electoral district I (Croatian: I. izborna jedinica) is one of twelve electoral districts of the Croatian Parliament. In 2025, the district had 353,009 registered voters.

== Boundaries ==
=== Creation in 1999 ===
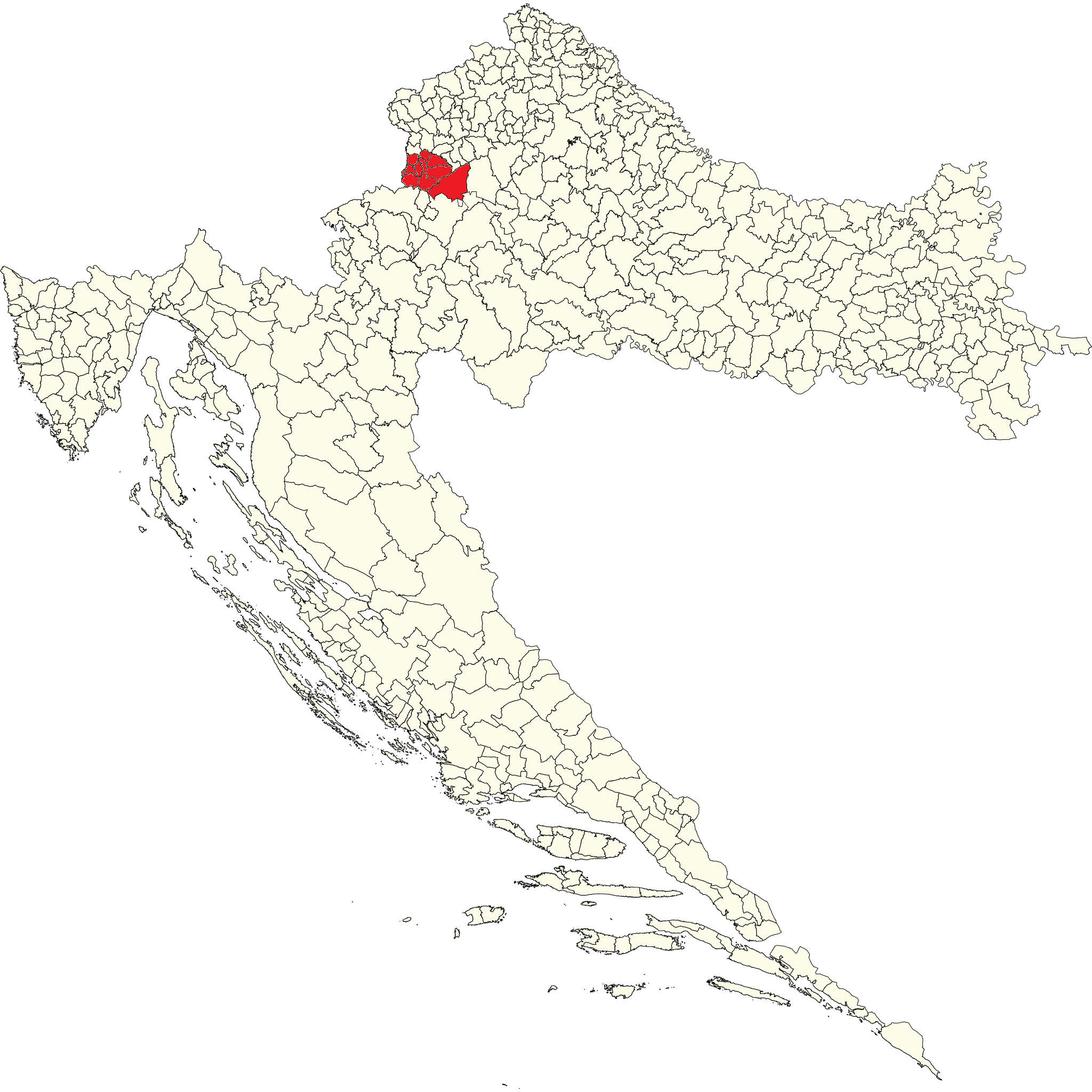
Electoral district I (1999-2023)

Electoral district I consisted of:

- Northwestern part of Zagreb County:
  - cities and municipalities: Bistra, Brdovec, Dubravica, Jakovlje, Luka, Marija Gorica, Pušča, Zaprešić;
- Central and Western City of Zagreb:
  - city districts and streets: Voćarska, Petrova, Ribnjak, Hrvatskih narodnih vladara, Antona Bauera, Matko Laginja, Pavao Šubić, Kralj Zvonimir, Petar Krešimir IV., Knez Mislav, Eugen Kvaternik, Maksimirska naselja, Ružmarinka, Peščenica, Šestine, Mlinovi, Gračani, Markuševec, Vidovec, Remete, Bukovec, Kozjak, Maksimir, Dobri Dol, Dinko Šimunović, Mašićeva, Dotršćina, Ban Keglević, Petar Zrinski, Stjepan Radić, Kraljevac, Ivan Kukuljević Sakcinski, Tuškanac, Gornji Grad, Nova Ves, August Cesarec, Zrinjevac, Cvjetni trg, Andrija Medulić, Ante Topić Mimara, Petar Svačić, August Šenoa, Gupčeva Zvijezda, Medveščak, Šalata, Samoborček, Podsused, Gornji Stenjevec, Perjavica-Borčec, Gornje Vrapče, Vrapče-centar, Vrapče-jug, Gornja Kustošija, Kustošija-centar, Sveti Duh, Medvedgrad, Šestinski Dol, Jelenovac, Matija Gubec, Rudeš, Ante Starčević, Ljubljanica, Ciglenica, Pongračevo, Nikola Tesla, Stara Trešnjevka, S.S. Kranjčević, Antun Mihanović, Bartol Kašić, Horvati-Srednjaci, Knežija, Trnjanska Savica, Martinovka, Poljane, Miramare, Cvjetnica, Marin Držić, Trnje, Cvjetno naselje, Veslačko naselje, Savski kuti, Staro Trnje, Hrvatskog književnika Mile Budaka, Sigečica.

=== 2023 revision ===
Under the 2023 revision, district boundaries were redrawn according to the suggestion of the Constitutional Court to compel a proportional number of voters.

The new district consists of:

- Central part of the City of Zagreb:
  - city districts: Črnomerec, Donji grad, Gornji grad – Medveščak, Maksimir, Novi Zagreb – istok, Peščenica – Žitnjak, Podsljeme and Trnje
- Southern part of Zagreb county:
  - cities and municipalities: Velika Gorica, Kravarsko, Orle, Pisarovina, Pokupsko and Rugvica

== Representatives ==
The current representatives of the first electoral district in the Croatian Parliament are:

| Name | Party | Deputizing |
|---|---|---|
| Krešimir Ačkar | HDZ | |
| Ljubica Lukačić | HDZ | Andrej Plenković |
| Željko Reiner | HDZ | |
| Maksimilijan Šimrak | HDZ | Nina Obuljen Koržinek |
| Damir Bakić | Možemo! | |
| Sandra Benčić | Možemo! | |
| Ivana Kekin | Možemo! | |
| Arsen Bauk | SDP | |
| Branko Kolarić | SDP | |
| Darko Klasić | HSLS | |
| Marija Selak Raspudić | Independent | |
| Dalija Orešković | DO i SIP | |
| Marijana Puljak | Centre | |

== Elections ==
=== 2000 Elections ===
| Party | Votes | % | Seats |
|---|---|---|---|
| SDP - HSLS | 141,435 | 50.58 | 9 |
| HDZ | 59,843 | 21.40 | 3 |
| HSS - LS - HNS - ASH | 33,934 | 12.13 | 2 |
| others | 44,430 | 15.89 | 0 |
| Total | 279,642 | 100.00 | 14 |
| Valid votes | 279,642 | 99.07 | |
| Invalid/blank votes | 2,612 | 0.93 | |
| Total votes | 282,254 | 100.00 | |
| Registered voters/turnout | 363,434 | 77.66 | |
Source: Results

SDP - HSLS

- Ivica Račan
- Milan Bandić
- Goran Granić
- Mirjana Ferić-Vac
- Goranko Fižulić
- Mirjana Didović
- Nenad Stazić
- Hrvoje Kraljević
- Ivo Šlaus

HDZ

- Mate Granić
- Zlatko Canjuga
- Marina Matulović-Dropulić

HSS - LS - HNS - ASH

- Vlado Gotovac
- Josip Torbar

=== 2003 Elections ===
| Party | Votes | % | Seats | +/- |
|---|---|---|---|---|
| SDP | 74.208 | 29.43 | 6 | -3 |
| HDZ | 64.919 | 25.93 | 5 | +2 |
| HNS | 27.031 | 10.79 | 2 | +2 |
| HSP - ZDS | 17.831 | 7.12 | 1 | +1 |
| others | 66.419 | 26.73 | 0 | -2 |
| Total | 250.408 | 100 | 14 | 0 |
| Valid votes | 250.408 | 98.53 | | |
| Invalid/blank votes | 3.730 | 1.47 | | |
| Total votes | 254.138 | 70.90 | | |
| Registered voters/turnout | 358.461 | | | |
Source: Results

SDP

- Ivica Račan
- Antun Vujić
- Mirko Filipović
- Ivo Josipović
- Vice Vukov
- Jelena Pavičić Vukičević

HDZ

- Jadranka Kosor
- Božo Biškupić
- Marko Turić
- Petar Selem
- Franjo Arapović

HNS

- Vesna Pusić
- Srećko Ferenčak

HSP - ZDS

- Slaven Letica

=== 2007 Elections ===
| Party | Votes | % | Seats | +/- |
|---|---|---|---|---|
| SDP | 101.250 | 42.06 | 8 | +2 |
| HDZ | 74.716 | 31.04 | 5 | 0 |
| HNS | 15.479 | 6.43 | 1 | -1 |
| others | 49.271 | 20.47 | 0 | -1 |
| Total | 240.716 | 100 | 14 | 0 |
| Valid votes | 240.716 | 98.86 | | |
| Invalid/blank votes | 2.764 | 1.14 | | |
| Total votes | 243.480 | 67.40 | | |
| Registered voters/turnout | 361.236 | | | |
Source: Results Archived 2022-11-04 at the Wayback Machine

SDP

- Zoran Milanović
- Antun Vujić
- Neven Mimica
- Ivo Josipović
- Mirela Holy
- Gvozden Srećko Flego
- Gordan Maras
- Mirjana Ferić-Vac

HDZ

- Jadranka Kosor
- Petar Selem
- Mladen Barišić
- Marko Turić
- Željko Turk

HNS

- Vesna Pusić

=== 2011 Elections ===
| Party | Votes | % | Seats | +/- |
|---|---|---|---|---|
| SDP - HNS - IDS - HSU | 107.382 | 45.65 | 9 | 0 |
| HDZ | 43.265 | 18.39 | 4 | -1 |
| HL SR | 18.059 | 7.68 | 1 | 1 |
| others | 66.511 | 28.28 | 0 | 0 |
| Total | 235.217 | 100 | 14 | 0 |
| Valid votes | 235.217 | 98.49 | | |
| Invalid/blank votes | 3.613 | 1.51 | | |
| Total votes | 238.830 | 66.57 | | |
| Registered voters/turnout | 358.750 | | | |
Source: Results Archived 2022-11-04 at the Wayback Machine

SDP - HNS - IDS - HSU

- Zoran Milanović
- Vesna Pusić
- Davor Bernardić
- Josip Kregar
- Tonino Picula
- Gordana Sobol
- Tomislav Saucha
- Gvozden Srećko Flego
- Igor Rađenović

HDZ

- Gordan Jandroković
- Miroslav Tuđman
- Željko Reiner
- Đurđica Sumrak

HL SR

- Branko Vukšić

=== 2015 Elections ===
| Party | Votes | % | Seats | +/- |
|---|---|---|---|---|
| SDP - HNS - HSU - HL SR - A-HSS - ZS | 91.262 | 39.15 | 7 | -3 |
| HDZ - HSS - HSP AS - BUZ - HSLS - HRAST - HDS - ZDS | 60.697 | 26.04 | 4 | 0 |
| Most | 42.880 | 18.39 | 3 | +3 |
| others | 38.286 | 16.42 | 0 | 0 |
| Total | 233.125 | 100 | 14 | 0 |
| Valid votes | 233.125 | 98.86 | | |
| Invalid/blank votes | 2.683 | 1.14 | | |
| Total votes | 235.808 | 69.98 | | |
| Registered voters/turnout | 336.961 | | | |
Source: Results Archived 2022-11-04 at the Wayback Machine

SDP - HNS - HSU - HL SR - A-HSS - ZS

- Zoran Milanović
- Vesna Pusić
- Davor Bernardić
- Igor Dragovan
- Orsat Miljenić
- Siniša Varga
- Joško Klisović

HDZ - HSS - HSP AS - BUZ - HSLS - HRAST - HDS - ZDS

- Željko Reiner
- Davorin Mlakar
- Darinko Kosor
- Margareta Mađerić

Most

- Drago Prgomet
- Gordana Rusak
- Irena Petrijevčanin Vuksanović

=== 2016 Elections ===
| Party | Votes | % | Seats | +/- |
|---|---|---|---|---|
| SDP - HNS - HSS - HSU | 77.541 | 39.36 | 7 | 0 |
| HDZ - HSLS | 62.310 | 31.63 | 5 | +1 |
| Most | 20.520 | 10.41 | 1 | -2 |
| ŽZ - PH - AM - Abeceda | 11.603 | 5.89 | 1 | +1 |
| others | 24.989 | 12.71 | 0 | 0 |
| Total | 196.963 | 100 | 14 | 0 |
| Valid votes | 196.963 | 98.47 | | |
| Invalid/blank votes | 3.060 | 1.53 | | |
| Total votes | 200.023 | 59.86 | | |
| Registered voters/turnout | 334.179 | | | |
Source: Results Archived 2022-11-04 at the Wayback Machine

SDP - HNS - HSS - HSU

- Zoran Milanović
- Vesna Pusić
- Davor Bernardić
- Igor Dragovan
- Orsat Miljenić
- Siniša Varga
- Joško Klisović

HDZ - HSLS

- Andrej Plenković
- Bruna Esih
- Gordan Jandroković
- Darinko Kosor
- Željko Reiner

Most

- Vlaho Orepić

ŽZ - PH - AM - Abeceda

- Goran Aleksić

=== 2020 Elections ===
| Party | Votes | % | Seats | +/- |
|---|---|---|---|---|
| HDZ - HSLS | 49.202 | 28.32 | 5 | 0 |
| SDP - HSS - HSU - SNAGA - GLAS - IDS - PGS | 38.701 | 22.72 | 3 | -4 |
| Možemo - ZJN - NL - RF - ORAH - ZG | 36.702 | 21.12 | 3 | +3 |
| DP - HS - BLOK - HKS - HRAST - SU - ZL | 15.586 | 8.97 | 1 | +1 |
| Most | 14.134 | 8.13 | 1 | 0 |
| SsIP - Pametno - Fokus | 11.029 | 6.34 | 1 | +1 |
| others | 8.364 | 4.40 | 0 | -1 |
| Total | 173.718 | 100 | 14 | 0 |
| Valid votes | 173.718 | 98.48 | | |
| Invalid/blank votes | 2.689 | 1.52 | | |
| Total votes | 176.407 | 51.61 | | |
| Registered voters/turnout | 341.787 | | | |
Source: Results Archived 2022-11-04 at the Wayback Machine

HDZ - HSLS

- Andrej Plenković
- Željko Reiner
- Nina Obuljen Koržinek
- Zvonko Milas
- Darko Klasić

SDP - HSS - HSU - SNAGA - GLAS - IDS - PGS

- Davor Bernardić
- Anka Mrak-Taritaš
- Nikša Vukas

Možemo - ZJN - NL - RF - ORAH - ZG

- Tomislav Tomašević
- Sandra Benčić
- Damir Bakić

DP - HS - BLOK - HKS - HRAST - SU - ZL

- Zlatko Hasanbegović

Most

- Marija Selak Raspudić

SsIP - Pametno - Fokus

- Dalija Orešković

=== 2024 Elections ===
| Party | Votes | % | Seats | +/- |
|---|---|---|---|---|
| HDZ - HSLS - HDS - HNS - HSU | 63.763 | 27.65 | 5 | 0 |
| SDP - Centar - HSS - DO i SIP - NS R - GLAS | 56.205 | 24.37 | 4 | 0 |
| Možemo | 45.831 | 19.87 | 3 | 0 |
| DP - PiP - BLOK - Agrameri | 21.439 | 9.29 | 1 | 0 |
| Most - HS - HKS - NLM | 17.134 | 7.43 | 1 | 0 |
| others | 26.179 | 12.39 | 0 | 0 |
| Total | 230.550 | 100 | 14 | 0 |
| Valid votes | 230.550 | 97.88 | | |
| Invalid/blank votes | 5.003 | 2.12 | | |
| Total votes | 235.553 | 69.07 | | |
| Registered voters/turnout | 341.023 | | | |
Source: Results Archived 2024-04-20 at the Wayback Machine

HDZ - HSLS - HDS - HNS - HSU

- Andrej Plenković
- Krešimir Ačkar
- Željko Reiner
- Nina Obuljen Koržinek
- Darko Klasić

SDP - Centar - HSS - DO i SIP - NS R - GLAS

- Arsen Bauk
- Dalija Orešković
- Branko Kolarić
- Marijana Puljak

Možemo

- Sandra Benčić
- Ivana Kekin
- Damir Bakić

DP - PiP - BLOK - Agrameri

- Mislav Kolakušić

Most - HS - HKS - NLM

- Marija Selak Raspudić
