= Marija Selak Raspudić =

Croatian politician (born 1982)

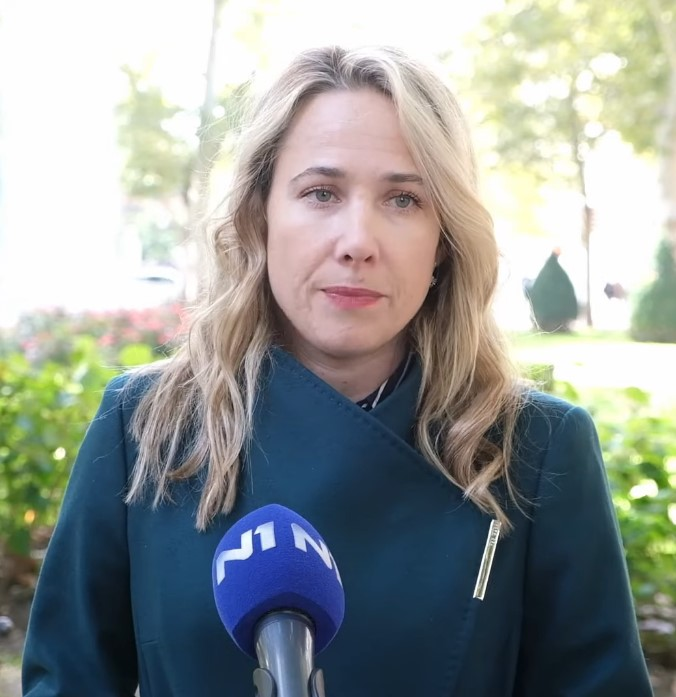

Member of the Croatian Parliament for 1st electoral district
- Incumbent
- Assumed office 22 July 2020

Personal details
- Born: Marija Selak; 14 March 1982 (age 44) Zagreb, SR Croatia, SFR Yugoslavia
- Party: Drito (2026–present)
- Other political affiliations: Independent (2024–2026); The Bridge (2020–2024)
- Spouse: Nino Raspudić (m. 2020)
- Children: 2
- Education: Faculty of Humanities and Social Sciences, University of Zagreb
- Website: marijaselakraspudic.hr

Marija Selak Raspudić (née Selak; born 14 March 1982) is a Croatian politician and bioethicist who has served as member of the Croatian Parliament since 2020. She is married to Nino Raspudić.

Selak Raspudić started her career working at the Faculty of Humanities and Social Sciences, later becoming a commentator on multiple television shows, most famously “Peti dan”. She boasts a national political following in Croatia, placing 3rd overall in the 2024 presidential elections and 2nd overall in the 2025 Zagreb local elections, losing to incumbent Tomislav Tomašević.

== Life ==
=== Early life and education ===
She was born in 1982 in Zagreb. She has roots from the Vrgorac region in the Dalmatian Hinterland, from where her parents moved to go study in Zagreb. Her parents, Danica and Ante, met while studying in Zagreb, where they would spend their careers and start a family. She grew up with two brothers and a sister in the neighborhood of Jarun. From 5th to 8th grade, she switched to a classical elementary school where she would be learning Greek and Latin. She recalls going to Rašćane to grandma Darinka from the father's side, who taught her how to bake bread and milk a cow. She also remembers going to Runovići to grandma Ana, where she would spend her summers swimming and exploring with friends. To this day, she likes to revisit the place. After elementary school, she enrolled in the Classical Gymnasium.

She graduated from the Faculty of Humanities and Social Sciences at the University of Zagreb in 2007 with a degree in philosophy and Croatian language and literature. In 2009, she enrolled in the postgraduate doctoral study in philosophy at the same faculty. In February 2010, she was a research assistant in the philosophy department on the project "Establishing Integrative Bioethics". In 2013, she received her doctorate degree. Her dissertation was entitled "Human Nature and the New Epoch".

=== Career ===
From 2004 to 2005, she worked on Z1 television as a host, and then as an editor of her own cultural show. From 2007 to 2008, she was the Head of the Public Relations at Olympic International. In 2008 she was employed as a journalist and scriptwriter for the show "Navrh jezika" on Croatian Radiotelevision. In August 2013 she obtained the status of a research associate – senior assistant. In 2015, she was elected as assistant professor in the field of humanities, branch of ontology, and promoted to an associate professor in 2020. From 2015 to 2020, she worked as a commentator for the show “Peti dan” with her future husband Nino Raspudić.

=== Private life ===
Marija Selak Raspudić and Nino Raspudić met working at the Faculty of Humanities and Social Sciences. They married in 2020 in a private wedding and have two children - daughter Danica and son Ilija.

== Political career ==
Selak Raspudić entered politics in 2020 when she ran as an independent on The Bridge list in the parliamentary election in the 1st constituency, where she won a mandate and entered the Croatian Parliament. She joined the Gender Equality Committee and the Physical Planning and Construction Committee. From September to October 2020, she was a substitute member of the Parliamentary Assembly of the Council of Europe representing The Bridge. Selak Raspudić was supposed to be one of The Bridge candidates for the 2024 European Parliament election together with Marin Miletić. The problem was that the two disagreed over abortion rights - Marija Selak Raspudić believed that abortion is a right, which didn’t sit well with Miletić. She left the party in April that year together with her husband. She was reelected to Parliament in 2024. At the start of her second term, she joined three committees: the European Affairs Committee, the Labor, Retirement System and Social Partnership Committee and the Environment and Nature Conservation Committee.

=== Candidacy for president ===
In July 2024, Marija Selak Raspudić announced her intention to run for President of the Republic of Croatia as a moderate independent, and in December collected enough signatures for an official candidacy. From 11 September to 21 December, she got €70,295 from donations, with the biggest donations coming from companies. She campaigned on being independent from any party or ideology, modernizing the military and fighting for the rights of Croats in Bosnia and Herzegovina. She got 150,435 votes or 9.25% of the vote, placing her third overall, behind the favorites Zoran Milanović and Dragan Primorac.

=== Candidacy for Mayor of Zagreb ===
Talks about her candidacy began after the presidential election, especially after a party by the name "Marija Selak Raspudić - Independent list" was registered. Shortly before her announcement, several billboards popped up with a slogan “Let the better win”. On 8 April 2025, Marija Selak Raspudić announced her intention to run for Mayor of Zagreb. After the announcement, she posted on her Facebook page a short video of incumbent Mayor Tomislav Tomašević and We Can! coordinator Sandra Benčić confidently announcing a victory, before ending the video with a smile saying: “Haven't you miscalculated a little bit?” On 25 April, she and her team, including her deputy mayor candidates Milka Rimac Bilušić and Damir Firšt, presented the party program for the city at the Westin hotel. By 29 April, she collected 7,000 signatures, enough for an official candidacy. Overall, she raised €55,554 from donations and spent €67,237 on her campaign. The polls had her in 2nd place ever since she announced her bid, with Mislav Herman from the Croatian Democratic Union trailing behind.

She got 44,645 votes (15.67% of the vote) in the election on 18 May, and since no candidate got over 50%, a runoff was called for 1 June. In the following week of campaigning, Selak Raspudić would go on to have three debates with Tomašević. In the runoff, which only saw a 34.43% voter turnout, Marija Selak Raspudić got 96,590 votes (42.44%), opposed to Tomašević's 130,996, granting him a second term. She congratulated him soon after.

== Political positions ==
Publicly, she declares herself neither a member of the right wing nor the left wing. She stated that the latter would give her an “unwanted position of moral superiority”, and believes that the former would be used against her as an insult or to dismiss her opinion.

=== Feminism and violence against women ===
Selak Raspudić is a critic of modern feminism and claims that the term is used as a “weapon of power” against those who do not share the same opinion. Regarding the Istanbul Convention, a document aimed at combating violence against women, Selak Raspudić said that the document is not necessary for a consensus on fighting violence against women and that it should not be used for blackmail. She also doesn’t see the possibility of adding femicide to the criminal code without "creating some type of discrimination."

=== LGBTQ rights ===
When asked about LGBTQ rights, Selak Raspudić said she believes that all people should be treated with respect and have equal rights, regardless of their sexual identity. She expressed criticism of the Istanbul Convention and the separation of gender from sex, saying it leads to “gender confusion”.
