= Mislav Herman =

Croatian politician (born 1977)

Member of the Croatian Parliament
- Incumbent
- Assumed office 16 May 2024
- Constituency: District VI

Personal details
- Born: 21 March 1977 (age 49)
- Party: Croatian Democratic Union

Mislav Herman (born 21 March 1977) is a Croatian politician serving as a member of the Croatian Parliament since 2024. He was the leader of the Croatian Democratic Union in Zagreb.
