= Nino Raspudić =

Croatian philosopher, writer, political analyst and parliamentarian

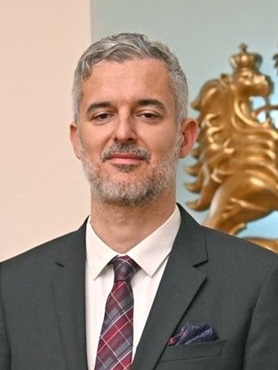
- Raspudić in 2023

Member of the Croatian Parliament
- Incumbent
- Assumed office 22 July 2020

Personal details
- Born: 3 November 1975 (age 50) Mostar, SR Bosnia and Herzegovina, SFR Yugoslavia
- Citizenship: Bosnia and Herzegovina; Croatia
- Party: Drito (2026–present)
- Other political affiliations: Independent (2024–2026); The Bridge (2020–2024)
- Spouse(s): Kristina Kumrić (divorced) Marija Selak (m. 2020)
- Children: 3
- Education: Faculty of Humanities and Social Sciences, University of Zagreb
- Occupation: Columnist, political analyst

Nino Raspudić (born 3 November 1975) is a Croatian conservative philosopher, writer, political analyst and member of the Croatian Parliament. He is a professor at the Faculty of Humanities and Social Sciences in Zagreb and the Faculty of Humanities in Mostar. He is a columnist for the Večernji list and Nezavisne novine, and is one of the editors of the Reflex, a political show on OBN Televizija.

== Biography ==
Nino Raspudić was born into a Herzegovinian Croat family in Mostar, Bosnia and Herzegovina, Yugoslavia. He finished elementary school in his birth town, and graduated from high school in Treviso, Italy. He graduated philosophy and Italian studies at the Faculty of Humanities and Social Sciences in Zagreb in 1999. He became a Junior Researcher at the Department of Italian Literature of the Faculty of Humanities and Social Sciences in Zagreb in 2000. In 2004 he gained master's degree with thesis Slaba misao - jaki pisci: postmoderna i talijanska književnost (Weak Thought - Strong Writers: a Postmodernist Poetics in the Modern Italian Prose). In 2008 he defended doctoral thesis Jadranski (polu)orijentalizam: prikazi Hrvata u talijanskoj književnosti (Trans-Adriatic Semi-Orientalism: Dominant Models in Constituting a Picture of Croats in Italian Literature from Enlightenment until Today).

Raspudić was one of the founders of the civic organisation Urban Movement (Serbo-Croatian: Urbani pokret) in Mostar together with Veselin Gatalo. Gatalo and Raspudić erected a life-size statue of Bruce Lee in Park Zrinjski in November 2005. The statue symbolised unity of Mostar in a city otherwise divided between Croats and Bosniaks.

Raspudić translated a number of works of various Italian writers, including Umberto Eco, Niccolò Ammaniti, Gianni Vattimo and Luigi Pareyson. He also published number of literary critics and essays.

== Works ==
- Raspudić, Nino (2006). Slaba misao - jaki pisci: postmoderna i talijanska književnost (in Croatian). Zagreb: Naklada Jurčić. ISBN 9789532450064.
- Raspudić, Nino (2010). Jadranski (polu)orijentalizam: prikazi Hrvata u talijanskoj književnost (in Croatian). Zagreb: Naklada Jurčić. ISBN 9789532450477.
- Raspudić, Nino (2014). 144 plus jedan kratki espresso (in Croatian). Zagreb: Večernji list. ISBN 9789532802283.
