= Opinion polling for the 2024 Croatian parliamentary election =

In the run-up to the 2024 Croatian parliamentary election, various organisations carried out monthly opinion polling to gauge voting intention in Croatia. Results of such polls are displayed in this article. The date range is from after the previous parliamentary election, held on 5 July 2020, to 17 April 2024 when the 2024 election was held.

== Graphical summary ==
The following graph depicts the evolution of standings of the two main political parties and three other parties in the poll average since last parliamentary elections.

LOESS curve of the polling for the 2024 Croatian Parliamentary Election.

== Party standings ==
Surveys in Croatia are conducted by specialized companies in the field of public opinion polls, and their results are published in cooperation with national television or newspapers. The media that publish the results are listed in the table below according to which TV show they publish the results, with which poll company they cooperate, the size of the poll, the number of polls conducted so far and the time of publication of the results.

| Media | Presentation of the results | Polling firm | Poll size | Conducted polls | Time of publication of polls |
|---|---|---|---|---|---|
| HRT | Dnevnik 2 at 19:00 (CET) | Promocija plus | 1,000-1,400 | 19 | 20th of the month (except in April 2022) |
| RTL | RTL Danas at 19:00 (CET) | Promocija plus | 1,300 | 43 | Between 4th and 10th of the month, usually on Sunday |
| Nova TV | Dnevnik Nove TV at 19:00 (CET) | Ipsos | 976–996 | 45 | Between 23rd and 26th of the month (Note: Ipsos polls are published on 25th of month when it is a weekday which is not a (non-working) public holiday and on a nearby working day otherwise. One exception was the first poll after the election, which was published on 25th of July 2020, which was a Saturday.) |
| N1 | N1 Newsroom at 16:00 (CET) | Masmi | 1,300 | 1 | One year after last general elections |
| Večernji list | Internet publication | 2x1 komunikacije | 1,041 | 11 | Between 24th and 30th of the month |

Poll results published by major media are listed in the table below in reverse chronological order, showing the most recent first, and using the date of publication, name of polling firm with a link to the page of results and poll size. The highest percentage figure in each polling survey is displayed in bold, and the background shaded in the leading party's color. In the instance that there is a tie, then all tied parties cells would be shaded. The lead column on the right shows the percentage-point difference between the two parties with the highest figures. When a specific poll does not show a data figure for a party or the support percentage is less than 1.0%, the party's cell corresponding to that poll is shown with a dash. Table also include other elections that are held between two parliamentary elections.

| Publication date | Polling firm | Votes | HDZ | SDP | DP | Most | Možemo | RF | Centar | | Fokus | KH | HNS | IDS | HSS | HSU | HS | SD | Others | Undecided | Lead |
|---|---|---|---|---|---|---|---|---|---|---|---|---|---|---|---|---|---|---|---|---|---|
| 17 Apr 2024 | 2024 elections | 2,180,985 | 34.3 | 25.4 | 9.6 | 8.0 | 9.1 | 0.8 | (Note: part of Rivers of justice coalition) | | 2.3 | (Note: part of DP-led coalition) | (Note: part of HDZ-led coalition) | 2.2 | (Note: part of Rivers of justice coalition) | (Note: part of HDZ-led coalition) | (Note: part of Most-led coalition) | (Note: part of Our Croatia coalition) | 8.3 | - | 8.9 |
| 25 Mar 2024 | Ipsos | 1,000 | 29.8 | 19.4 | 7.9 | 7.6 | 7.0 | - | - | | - | - | - | - | - | - | - | - | 16.1 | 12.2 | 10.4 |
| 22 Mar 2024 | **SDP, Centre, GLAS, NS R, HSS and SSIP presented Rivers of Justice coalition.** | | | | | | | | | | | | | | | | | | | | |
| 20 Mar 2024 | Promocija plus | 1,000 | 27.7 | 21.6 | 7.7 | 7.1 | 9.0 | 1.0 | 1.2 | | 1.1 | - | 1.2 | 1.1 | 1.1 | 1.1 | - | - | 6.1 (Note: incl. 1.3% for OiP) | 13.0 | 6.1 |
| 17 Mar 2024 | Ipsos | 604 | 27.3 | 22.6 | 7.9 | 8.7 | 8.7 | - | - | | - | - | - | - | - | - | - | - | 14.9 | 10.1 | 4.7 |
| 15 Mar 2024 | **Croatian president Zoran Milanović entered the race as SDP candidate for Prime Minister** | | | | | | | | | | | | | | | | | | | | |
| 10 Mar 2024 | Promocija plus | 1,300 | 26.5 | 17.9 | 7.7 | 7.9 | 7.8 | 1.0 | 1.9 | | 1.0 | - | 1.1 | 1.3 | 1.4 | 1.1 | - | - | 7.3 (Note: incl. 1.2% for OiP) | 16.1 | 8.6 |
| 23 Feb 2024 | Ipsos | 989 | 28.7 | 13.9 | 6.9 | 7.0 | 7.6 | - | - | | - | - | - | - | - | - | - | - | 17.2 | 18.1 | 14.8 |
| 20 Feb 2024 | Promocija plus | 1,000 | 25.2 | 17.3 | 8.5 | 8.7 | 8.1 | - | 1.2 | | 1.0 | - | 1.2 | 1.1 | 1.4 | 1.1 | - | - | 7.5 | 17.7 | 7.9 |
| 4 Feb 2024 | Promocija Plus | 1,300 | 25.6 | 16.0 | 8.4 | 9.1 | 8.9 | 1.0 | 1.5 | | 1.0 | - | - | 1.3 | 1.1 | - | - | - | 7.3 (Note: incl. 1.1% for OiP) | 18.8 | 9.6 |
| 27 Jan 2024 | Promocija Plus | 1,000 | 25.6 | 15.8 | 7.9 | 8.1 | 8.3 | 1.1 | 1.9 | | 1.6 | - | 1.2 | 1.1 | 1.3 | 1.0 | - | 1.1 | 4.4 | 18.2 | 9.8 |
| 25 Jan 2024 | Ipsos | 995 | 29.1 | 13.5 | 7.6 | 6.6 | 6.7 | - | - | | - | - | - | - | - | - | - | - | 17.9 | 18.6 | 15.6 |
| 10 Jan 2024 | Promocija Plus | 1,300 | 25.9 | 15.8 | 7.8 | 8.4 | 8.7 | 1.0 | 1.4 | | 1.5 | - | 1.2 | 1.2 | 1.3 | 1.0 | 1.0 | 1.1 | 4.2 | 18.5 | 10.1 |
2024
| 22 Dec 2023 | Ipsos | 987 | 28.2 | 12.9 | 8.4 | 7.5 | 6.8 | - | - | | - | - | 1.3 | - | 2.2 | 2.8 | - | 1.3 | 8.9 (Note: incl. 2.4% for OiP and 1.0% HSP) | 19.7 | 15.3 |
| 16 Dec 2023 | **DHSS and DP presented coalition.** | | | | | | | | | | | | | | | | | | | | |
| 10 Dec 2023 | Promocija plus | 1,300 | 25.0 | 15.5 | 7.9 | 7.7 | 9.2 | 1.7 | 1.9 | | 1.4 | - | 1.2 | 1.1 | 1.3 | 1.0 | 1.1 | 1.0 | 4.2 | 18.8 | 9.5 |
| 9 Dec 2023 | **Fokus, IDS, NS R and PGS presented coalition.** | | | | | | | | | | | | | | | | | | | | |
| 24 Nov 2023 | Ipsos | 990 | 29.5 | 12.6 | 7.9 | 8.1 | 7.9 | - | - | | - | - | 1.5 | - | 1.1 | 1.6 | - | - | 11.8 (Note: incl. 2.4% for OiP and 1.8% BUZ) | 18.0 | 16.9 |
| 20 Nov 2023 | Promocija plus | 1,100 | 25.2 | 15.4 | 8.3 | 7.0 | 9.9 | 1.5 | 2.0 | | 1.5 | 1.0 | 1.2 | 1.2 | 1.3 | - | 1.1 | - | 5.7 (Note: incl. 1.0% for OiP) | 17.7 | 9.8 |
| 12 Nov 2023 | Promocija plus | 1,300 | 25.3 | 15.2 | 8.4 | 7.4 | 11.0 | 1.7 | 1.8 | | 1.4 | - | 1.2 | 1.0 | 1.3 | - | 1.0 | 1.1 | 5.5 | 16.7 | 10.1 |
| 25 Oct 2023 | Ipsos | 993 | 29.8 | 13.4 | 7.7 | 9.2 | 8.2 | - | - | | - | - | 1.3 | - | 1.7 | 2.3 | - | - | 9.8 (Note: incl. 1.2% for HSLS and 1.2% for OiP) | 16.6 | 16.4 |
| 20 Oct 2023 | Promocija plus | 1,100 | 25.7 | 15.8 | 7.3 | 7.9 | 10.9 | 1.9 | 2.0 | | 1.3 | 1.0 | 1.2 | 1.0 | 1.4 | - | - | - | 6.2 | 16.4 | 9.9 |
| 17 Oct 2023 | **HL, HSS and SD presented coalition.** | | | | | | | | | | | | | | | | | | | | |
| 8 Oct 2023 | Promocija plus | 1,300 | 25.6 | 15.6 | 7.5 | 8.2 | 11.4 | 1.8 | 1.7 | | 1.0 | - | 1.1 | - | 1.4 | - | - | 1.2 | 7.0 | 16.5 | 10.0 |
| 25 Sep 2023 | Ipsos | 988 | 29.9 | 12.4 | 6.5 | 8.9 | 9.0 | - | - | | - | - | 1.6 | 2.0 | 1.2 | 1.4 | - | - | 10.2 (Note: incl. 2.1% for OiP) | 16.9 | 17.5 |
| 20 Sep 2023 | Promocija plus | 1,100 | 25.6 | 15.5 | 7.4 | 8.3 | 11.2 | 1.1 | 1.8 | | 1.3 | 1.1 | 1.2 | 1.0 | 1.4 | - | - | - | 6.6 (Note: incl. 1.0% for OiP) | 16.5 | 10.1 |
| 10 Sep 2023 | Promocija plus | 1,300 | 25.4 | 15.5 | 7.8 | 8.6 | 11.0 | 1.2 | 2.3 | | 1.1 | - | 1.1 | 1.0 | 1.3 | - | 1.0 | - | 5.8 (Note: incl. 1.0% for OiP) | 16.9 | 9.9 |
| 25 Aug 2023 | Ipsos | 989 | 27.9 | 11.5 | 6.5 | 8.7 | 10.4 | - | - | | - | - | 1.1 | 2.8 | 1.7 | 2.1 | - | 1.6 | 8.8 (Note: incl. 1.6% for OiP) | 16.9 | 16.3 |
| 6 Aug 2023 | Promocija plus | 1,300 | 25.2 | 14.7 | 7.7 | 8.8 | 11.2 | 1.4 | 2.5 | | 1.0 | - | - | 1.0 | 1.4 | - | - | 1.2 | 7.3 (Note: incl. 1.1% for OiP and 1.1% for AP) | 16.6 | 10.5 |
| 25 Jul 2023 | Ipsos | 977 | 29.4 | 10.7 | 7.1 | 8.0 | 10.6 | - | - | | - | - | 1.6 | 1.7 | 2.4 | 2.6 | 1.4 | - | 9.1 | 15.4 | 18.7 |
| 9 Jul 2023 | Promocija plus | 1,300 | 25.5 | 16.7 | 7.5 | 8.5 | 9.7 | 1.4 | 2.8 | | 1.2 | - | - | 1.1 | 1.5 | - | 1.3 | - | 6.1 (Note: incl. 1.1% for AP) | 16.7 | 8.8 |
| 8 Jul 2023 | **HS and Most presented the coalition.** | | | | | | | | | | | | | | | | | | | | |
| 4 Jul 2023 | 2x1 komunikacije | 1,041 | 25.0 | 15.5 | 7.5 | 8.1 | 8.8 | 1.1 | 2.1 | | 1.4 | - | - | 1.8 | 1.6 | 3.1 | 2.1 | 1.5 | 3.4 | 17.0 | 9.5 |
| 25 Jun 2023 | Ipsos | 992 | 28.6 | 11.7 | 7.2 | 8.9 | 10.0 | - | 1.0 | | 1.0 | - | 1.3 | 2.1 | - | 1.8 | - | - | 8.1 (Note: incl. 1.1% for OiP and 1.1% for UZ) | 18.3 | 17.0 |
| 4 Jun 2023 | Promocija plus | 1,300 | 26.2 | 16.7 | 7.1 | 8.2 | 9.4 | 2.0 | 3.0 | | 1.2 | - | - | 1.1 | 1.7 | - | 1.3 | - | 5.9 (Note: incl. 1.1% for AP) | 16.2 | 9.5 |
| 27 May 2023 | 2x1 komunikacije | 1,041 | 24.6 | 15.3 | 7.5 | 8.5 | 9.5 | - | - | | - | - | - | - | - | 3.2 | 2.2 | 2.1 | - | 27.1 | 9.3 |
| 25 May 2023 | Ipsos | 992 | 30.3 | 12.6 | 6.9 | 7.3 | 9.0 | - | 1.4 | | - | - | 1.4 | - | 1.6 | 2.3 | 1.2 | 1.3 | 7.4 (Note: incl. 1.2% for OiP and 1.1% for HSP) | 17.3 | 17.7 |
| 20 May 2023 | Promocija plus | 1,100 | 26.8 | 16.7 | 6.2 | 8.6 | 9.7 | 1.2 | 3.4 | | 1.2 | 1.3 | - | 1.3 | 1.4 | - | 1.1 | - | 4.4 | 15.8 | 10.1 |
| 7 May 2023 | Promocija plus | 1,300 | 25.9 | 16.2 | 6.6 | 8.8 | 9.2 | 1.6 | 3.2 | | 1.5 | 1.2 | - | 1.1 | 1.3 | - | 1.4 | - | 5.1 | 16.9 | 9.7 |
| 28 Apr 2023 | 2x1 komunikacije | 1,041 | 23.5 | 15.2 | 7.4 | 9.4 | 10.0 | 1.7 | 1.9 | | 1.4 | - | - | 1.7 | 1.5 | 3.1 | 2.4 | 2.3 | 2.4 | 16.1 | 8.3 |
| 25 Apr 2023 | Ipsos | 982 | 30.9 | 13.6 | 6.0 | 8.7 | 8.8 | - | 1.8 | | - | - | 1.2 | 1.9 | - | 1.2 | - | - | 8.9 (Note: incl. 1.3% for BUZ) | 17.0 | 17.3 |
| 20 Apr 2023 | Promocija plus | 1,100 | 26.1 | 16.0 | 6.1 | 9.0 | 9.7 | 1.8 | 3.4 | | 1.3 | - | - | 1.0 | 1.8 | - | 1.1 | 1.0 | 5.9 | 15.8 | 10.1 |
| 9 Apr 2023 | Promocija plus | 1,300 | 25.8 | 15.6 | 6.7 | 8.3 | 9.4 | 1.8 | 3.4 | | 1.5 | - | - | 1.1 | 1.6 | - | 1.4 | - | 6.7 | 16.7 | 10.2 |
| 1 Apr 2023 | 2x1 komunikacije | 1,041 | 23.6 | 14.8 | 7.7 | 9.2 | 9.8 | 2.0 | 1.8 | | 1.2 | - | - | 1.6 | - | 3.3 | 2.2 | 2.3 | 3.6 | 16.9 | 8.8 |
| 24 Mar 2023 | Ipsos | 991 | 30.4 | 12.4 | 6.4 | 8.4 | 7.2 | - | 2.2 | | - | - | - | 1.8 | 1.2 | 2.0 | - | - | 8.8 | 19.2 | 18.0 |
| 20 Mar 2023 | Promocija plus | 1,100 | 26.1 | 15.8 | 6.8 | 9.3 | 9.8 | 1.6 | 3.4 | | 1.2 | 1.0 | 1.0 | - | 1.2 | - | - | 1.1 | 6.3 | 15.4 | 10.3 |
| 5 Mar 2023 | Promocija plus | 1,300 | 25.7 | 15.4 | 6.8 | 9.3 | 9.8 | 1.3 | 3.2 | | 1.3 | 1.2 | 1.0 | 1.0 | 1.2 | - | 1.0 | 1.1 | 4.2 | 16.5 | 10.3 |
| 25 Feb 2023 | 2x1 komunikacije | 1,041 | 24.1 | 14.7 | 7.5 | 9.5 | 9.6 | 1.5 | 2.1 | | - | - | - | 1.7 | 1.3 | 3.2 | 2.3 | 3.0 | 2.2 | 16.8 | 9.4 |
| 24 Feb 2023 | Ipsos | 991 | 29.3 | 12.2 | 5.7 | 9.0 | 8.6 | - | 2.8 | | 1.5 | - | 1.5 | 1.5 | 1.7 | 1.7 | - | - | 9.4 (Note: incl. 1.6% for SU) | 15.1 | 17.1 |
| 5 Feb 2023 | Promocija plus | 1,300 | 25.5 | 15.0 | 6.3 | 9.1 | 9.7 | 1.4 | 3.0 | | 1.4 | - | 1.0 | 1.0 | 1.4 | 1.0 | 1.1 | 1.6 | 5.1 | 16.4 | 10.5 |
| 1 Feb 2023 | 2x1 komunikacije | 1,041 | 25.4 | 15.3 | 7.2 | 9.3 | 9.9 | 1.5 | 2.0 | | - | - | - | 1.3 | 1.2 | 3.0 | 2.1 | 3.1 | 2.6 | 16.1 | 10.1 |
| 25 Jan 2023 | Ipsos | 996 | 30.0 | 11.6 | 6.3 | 8.7 | 8.0 | - | 1.1 | | - | - | 1.4 | 2.0 | 2.3 | 2.2 | 1.3 | 1.5 | 7.1 (Note: incl. 1.2% for HSLS and 1.1% for SU) | 16.5 | 18.4 |
| 8 Jan 2023 | Promocija plus | 1,300 | 26.4 | 14.8 | 6.1 | 9.1 | 10.1 | 1.3 | 3.0 | | 1.4 | 1.2 | - | 1.0 | 1.2 | - | 1.0 | 1.7 | 5.4 | 16.3 | 11.6 |
2023
| 30 Dec 2022 | 2x1 komunikacije | 1,041 | 24.7 | 14.7 | 7.0 | 9.1 | 10.0 | 1.4 | 2.1 | | - | - | - | 1.3 | - | 3.1 | 2.1 | 2.2 | 4.8 | 17.5 | 10.0 |
| 23 Dec 2022 | Ipsos | 990 | 30.7 | 12.3 | 6.8 | 8.0 | 7.5 | 1.6 | - | | - | - | 1.8 | 2.1 | 1.5 | 1.4 | 1.1 | - | 7.5 | 17.7 | 18.4 |
| 4 Dec 2022 | Promocija plus | 1,300 | 26.9 | 15.4 | 5.9 | 9.0 | 10.2 | 1.9 | 2.9 | | 1.3 | 1.1 | - | 1.1 | 1.2 | - | - | 1.5 | 6.2 | 15.4 | 11.5 |
| 26 Nov 2022 | 2x1 komunikacije | 1,041 | 23.5 | 14.9 | 7.0 | 9.4 | 10.3 | 1.4 | 2.0 | | - | - | - | 1.3 | - | 3.1 | 2.0 | 2.5 | 4.9 | 17.7 | 8.6 |
| 25 Nov 2022 | Ipsos | 990 | 29.9 | 11.7 | 5.8 | 8.3 | 8.6 | - | 1.0 | | 1.5 | - | 1.9 | 3.0 | - | 1.6 | 1.6 | - | 7.6 | 17.5 | 18.2 |
| 20 Nov 2022 | Promocija plus | 1,400 | 25.7 | 15.7 | 5.5 | 8.5 | 10.8 | 1.2 | 3.0 | | 1.2 | - | - | 1.0 | 1.3 | - | - | 1.5 | 6.5 | 18.1 | 10.0 |
| 6 Nov 2022 | Promocija plus | 1,300 | 24.7 | 16.5 | 6.1 | 9.5 | 10.0 | 1.2 | 2.2 | | 1.4 | - | - | - | 1.3 | - | 1.1 | 1.3 | 7.4 | 17.3 | 8.2 |
| 29 Oct 2022 | 2x1 komunikacije | 1,041 | 23.1 | 15.2 | 7.1 | 9.5 | 10.4 | 1.2 | 2.1 | | - | - | - | 1.2 | - | 3.1 | 1.9 | 2.6 | 4.7 | 17.9 | 7.9 |
| 25 Oct 2022 | Ipsos | 987 | 28.4 | 12.7 | 6.2 | 8.9 | 7.9 | - | - | | 1.9 | 1.5 | 2.1 | 2.9 | 1.7 | 3.6 | - | - | 9.9 | 12.3 | 15.7 |
| 20 Oct 2022 | Promocija plus | 1,400 | 24.6 | 16.2 | 5.4 | 9.3 | 11.2 | 1.2 | 2.7 | | 1.3 | 1.0 | - | 1.1 | 1.5 | - | - | 1.6 | 5.0 | 17.9 | 8.4 |
| 9 Oct 2022 | Promocija plus | 1,300 | 24.4 | 16.7 | 6.0 | 9.2 | 10.6 | - | 2.3 | | 1.4 | - | - | - | 1.4 | - | - | 1.4 | 8.8 | 17.8 | 7.7 |
| 26 Sep 2022 | Ipsos | 986 | 28.1 | 13.2 | 5.7 | 8.6 | 8.4 | 1.8 | - | | 2.0 | - | - | 3.2 | - | 3.3 | - | - | 12.5 | 13.2 | 14.9 |
| 24 Sep 2022 | 2x1 komunikacije | 1,041 | 23.9 | 15.0 | 7.2 | 9.7 | 9.7 | 1.0 | 2.0 | | - | - | - | 1.2 | - | 3.1 | 2.1 | 3.3 | 4.2 | 17.6 | 8.9 |
| 20 Sep 2022 | Promocija plus | 1,400 | 25.2 | 16.7 | 5.7 | 8.7 | 10.9 | 1.2 | 2.3 | | 1.4 | 1.2 | - | 1.0 | 1.5 | - | 1.0 | 1.3 | 4.0 | 17.9 | 8.5 |
| 4 Sep 2022 | Promocija plus | 1,300 | 24.2 | 16.6 | 5.5 | 9.4 | 10.6 | - | 2.2 | | 1.6 | 1.6 | - | - | 1.8 | - | - | 1.3 | 7.1 | 18.1 | 7.6 |
| 30 Aug 2022 | 2x1 komunikacije | 1,041 | 25.9 | 14.8 | 6.9 | 9.2 | 9.9 | - | 1.7 | | - | - | - | 1.4 | - | 2.2 | 1.9 | 3.0 | 5.7 | 17.4 | 11.1 |
| 25 Aug 2022 | Ipsos | 981 | 30.1 | 13.2 | 4.0 | 9.2 | 9.0 | - | - | | 2.5 | 1.5 | - | 2.9 | 1.5 | 2.5 | - | - | 7.2 | 16.4 | 16.9 |
| 7 Aug 2022 | Promocija plus | 1,300 | 27.1 | 16.1 | 5.8 | 8.4 | 10.6 | 1.1 | 1.9 | | 1.3 | - | - | - | 1.3 | - | - | 1.0 | 7.6 | 17.8 | 11.0 |
| 2 Aug 2022 | 2x1 komunikacije | 1,041 | 26.2 | 15.5 | 6.7 | 9.1 | 10.7 | - | 1.8 | | - | - | - | 1.4 | - | 1.7 | 2.2 | 3.7 | 1.9 | 19.1 | 10.7 |
| 25 Jul 2022 | Ipsos | 984 | 29.1 | 13.9 | 5.1 | 8.2 | 9.9 | - | 1.6 | | 1.5 | - | - | 1.8 | 1.9 | 2.1 | 1.1 | - | 7.0 (Note: incl. 1.2% for HDS) | 16.8 | 15.2 |
| 10 Jul 2022 | Promocija plus | 1,300 | 27.3 | 17.5 | 5.5 | 8.4 | 11.6 | - | 2.6 | | - | - | - | 1.0 | 1.1 | - | - | - | 6.6 | 18.4 | 9.8 |
| 24 Jun 2022 | Ipsos | 990 | 29.3 | 12.8 | 6.3 | 9.1 | 8.9 | 1.0 | 2.2 | | - | - | 1.9 | 2.1 | 1.9 | 2.1 | 1.1 | - | 4.3 (Note: incl. 1.0% for Blok) | 16.8 | 16.5 |
| 5 Jun 2022 | Promocija plus | 1,300 | 26.7 | 16.6 | 5.1 | 9.2 | 12.3 | - | 2.0 | | 1.1 | 1.0 | - | 1.0 | 1.7 | - | - | - | 5.6 | 17.7 | 10.1 |
| 27 May 2022 | 2x1 komunikacije | 1,041 | 24.9 | 16.7 | 5.1 | 9.9 | 14.3 | - | 1.1 | | - | - | - | 1.4 | - | - | 1.3 | - | 7.4 | 17.9 | 8.2 |
| 25 May 2022 | Ipsos | 976 | 30.0 | 14.1 | 5.6 | 10.2 | 10.2 | - | 1.2 | | - | 1.9 | 1.8 | 1.5 | 1.6 | 3.1 | - | - | 6.3 (Note: incl. 1.6% for SDSS) | 12.6 | 15.9 |
| 20 May 2022 | Promocija plus | 1,400 | 26.4 | 17.7 | 4.6 | 9.1 | 12.0 | - | 2.0 | | 1.1 | - | 1.0 | 1.1 | 1.6 | - | - | - | 6.3 | 17.1 | 8.7 |
| 8 May 2022 | Promocija plus | 1,300 | 26.1 | 17.5 | 4.8 | 9.2 | 12.6 | - | 1.9 | | 1.2 | - | 1.1 | 1.0 | 1.6 | - | - | - | 5.9 | 17.1 | 8.6 |
| 25 Apr 2022 | Ipsos | 987 | 28.6 | 15.9 | 4.8 | 9.0 | 9.1 | - | 2.3 | | - | 1.1 | 1.9 | 1.9 | - | 2.0 | - | - | 7.0 (Note: incl. 1.0% for HSLS) | 16.4 | 12.7 |
| 24 Apr 2022 | Promocija plus | 1,400 | 25.2 | 17.0 | 5.7 | 9.7 | 12.3 | - | 2.0 | | 1.3 | - | 1.0 | 1.1 | 1.8 | - | - | - | 5.8 | 17.1 | 8.2 |
| 10 Apr 2022 | Promocija plus | 1,300 | 25.4 | 17.1 | 4.7 | 10.3 | 12.8 | - | 1.6 | | 1.2 | - | - | 1.0 | 1.7 | - | - | - | 6.9 | 17.3 | 8.3 |
| 25 Mar 2022 | Ipsos | 990 | 28.1 | 14.0 | 5.6 | 10.1 | 10.7 | 1.0 | 2.6 | | 1.2 | 1.7 | 1.3 | - | 1.3 | 1.1 | 1.4 | - | 4.0 | 16.0 | 14.1 |
| 20 Mar 2022 | Promocija plus | 1,400 | 25.0 | 16.1 | 6.5 | 10.2 | 12.2 | - | 1.6 | | 1.3 | - | 1.1 | 1.2 | 1.7 | - | - | - | 6.2 | 16.9 | 8.9 |
| 6 Mar 2022 | Promocija plus | 1,300 | 25.2 | 17.0 | 6.3 | 10.6 | 12.5 | - | 1.4 | | 1.3 | - | - | 1.0 | 1.6 | - | - | - | 6.7 | 16.4 | 8.2 |
| 25 Feb 2022 | Ipsos | 600 (Note: Given certain events at the beginning of the month, Ipsos conducted a second survey on a smaller sample than usual) | 26.9 | 13.7 | 6.4 | 12.4 | 12.9 | - | 1.6 | | - | 2.8 | - | 1.4 | 1.1 | 2.6 | - | - | 5.2 (Note: incl. 1.0% for NS R) | 13.0 | 13.2 |
| 6 Feb 2022 | Promocija Plus | 1,300 | 26.2 | 17.9 | 4.3 | 11.1 | 12.9 | - | 1.3 | | 1.5 | - | - | 1.0 | 1.2 | - | - | - | 7.4 | 15.8 | 8.3 |
| 25 Jan 2022 | Ipsos | 991 | 30.4 | 13.5 | 6.0 | 8.8 | 9.4 | 1.2 | 2.3 | | 1.6 | - | 1.0 | 1.8 | - | 1.2 | - | - | 6.0 | 16.8 | 16.9 |
| 9 Jan 2022 | Promocija Plus | 1,300 | 26.1 | 16.9 | 3.7 | 12.4 | 13.3 | 1.0 | 1.4 | | 1.4 | - | - | 1.1 | 1.2 | - | 1.3 | - | 6.3 | 15.2 | 9.2 |
2022
| 24 Dec 2021 | Ipsos | 987 | 29.7 | 13.1 | 5.3 | 10.6 | 8.8 | - | 1.3 | | 1.3 | 2.4 | 1.2 | 1.7 | 1.6 | - | - | - | 5.5 | 17.2 | 16.6 |
| 5 Dec 2021 | Promocija plus | 1,300 | 27.1 | 16.1 | 4.9 | 8.5 | 14.2 | - | 1.2 | | 1.6 | - | - | 1.0 | 1.1 | - | 1.5 | - | 6.1 | 16.7 | 11.0 |
| 25 Nov 2021 | Ipsos | 990 | 29.5 | 13.2 | 4.8 | 9.4 | 10.3 | - | 2.6 | | - | 2.3 | 1.5 | - | - | 1.2 | 1.2 | - | 6.3 | 17.6 | 16.3 |
| 20 Nov 2021 | Promocija plus | 1,400 | 27.5 | 15.7 | 4.5 | 8.0 | 15.4 | - | 1.5 | | 1.5 | 1.2 | - | 1.2 | 1.6 | - | 1.4 | - | 4.5 | 16.0 | 11.8 |
| 7 Nov 2021 | Promocija plus | 1,300 | 27.4 | 16.0 | 5.0 | 8.0 | 15.9 | - | 1.2 | | 1.3 | 1.1 | - | 1.0 | 1.3 | - | 1.2 | - | 5.1 | 15.5 | 11.4 |
| 25 Oct 2021 | Ipsos | 981 | 30.9 | 12.2 | 4.5 | 8.2 | 11.2 | - | 2.0 | | - | 1.9 | 2.0 | 1.6 | 2.0 | - | 1.7 | - | 7.2 (Note: incl. 1.2% for HDS) | 14.6 | 18.7 |
| 20 Oct 2021 | Promocija plus | 1,400 | 27.3 | 15.9 | 4.1 | 6.8 | 16.1 | - | 1.3 | | 1.5 | 1.2 | - | 1.0 | 1.5 | - | 1.3 | - | 5.4 | 16.6 | 11.2 |
| 10 Oct 2021 | Promocija plus | 1,300 | 27.6 | 16.1 | 3.7 | 6.7 | 17.1 | - | 1.3 | | 1.3 | 1.3 | 1.1 | 1.1 | 1.3 | - | 1.0 | - | 4.2 | 16.2 | 10.5 |
| 23 Sep 2021 | Ipsos | 990 | 30.8 | 13.4 | 5.2 | 8.3 | 13.6 | - | - | | 1.1 | 1.8 | - | 1.7 | - | 1.5 | 1.4 | - | 6.2 (Note: incl. 1.0% for GLAS) | 15.0 | 17.2 |
| 20 Sep 2021 | Promocija plus | 1,400 | 27.1 | 17.1 | 3.9 | 8.5 | 16.1 | - | 1.5 | | 1.7 | - | - | 1.4 | 1.5 | - | 1.4 | - | 5.3 | 14.5 | 10.0 |
| 5 Sep 2021 | Promocija plus | 1,300 | 27.3 | 17.9 | 3.8 | 7.7 | 17.2 | - | 1.8 | | 1.9 | - | - | 1.0 | 1.5 | - | - | - | 6.2 | 13.7 | 9.4 |
| 25 Aug 2021 | Ipsos | 987 | 30.0 | 12.7 | 5.0 | 8.9 | 15.6 | 1.3 | 1.1 | | 1.5 | 1.2 | - | - | - | 2.7 | - | - | 5.8 | 14.2 | 14.4 |
| 26 Jul 2021 | Ipsos | 984 | 29.8 | 14.3 | 7.7 | 7.6 | 14.9 | - | 1.6 | | 1.6 | 2.0 | - | - | 1.6 | 2.8 | - | - | 8.1 (Note: incl. 1.2% for NS R) | 8.0 | 14.9 |
| 11 Jul 2021 | Promocija plus | 1,300 | 27.4 | 18.7 | 6.4 | 4.8 | 16.9 | - | 1.2 | | 1.3 | - | 1.1 | 1.2 | 1.5 | - | - | - | 5.7 | 13.7 | 8.7 |
| 7 Jul 2021 | Masmi | 1,300 | 30.9 | 15.2 | 8.4 | 7.4 | 13.5 | 1.4 | 1.1 | | 1.7 | - | - | - | - | - | - | - | 6.0 (Note: incl. 1.3% for NL Matija Posavec, 1.2% for BM 365 and 1.1% for NS R) | 12.1 | 15.7 |
| 25 Jun 2021 | Ipsos | 991 | 30.7 | 13.4 | 6.4 | 6.8 | 12.6 | - | - | | 1.1 | 2.4 | - | - | 2.6 | 1.5 | - | - | 7.5 | 15.0 | 17.3 |
| 6 Jun 2021 | Promocija plus | 1,300 | 26.8 | 18.9 | 8.2 | 5.4 | 13.4 | - | 1.5 | | 1.4 | - | 1.4 | - | 1.7 | - | - | - | 7.4 (Note: incl. 1.2% for BM365) | 13.9 | 7.9 |
| 30 May 2021 | **2021 Croatian local elections - second round** | | | | | | | | | | | | | | | | | | | | |
| 25 May 2021 | Ipsos | 986 | 30.5 | 15.2 | 7.3 | 6.7 | 9.4 | - | 2.2 | | 1.3 | 1.4 | 1.2 | 2.8 | 1.5 | 1.3 | - | - | 5.5 | 13.7 | 15.3 |
| 16 May 2021 | **2021 Croatian local elections - first round** | | | | | | | | | | | | | | | | | | | | |
| 9 May 2021 | Promocija plus | 1,300 | 26.7 | 19.6 | 8.2 | 7.1 | 9.1 | - | 1.0 | | 1.0 | - | 1.2 | 1.3 | 1.6 | - | - | - | 8.6 (Note: incl. 1.6% for BM365) | 14.6 | 7.1 |
| 23 Apr 2021 | Ipsos | 986 | 29.3 | 15.1 | 6.6 | 7.7 | 8.7 | 1.7 | 1.2 | | - | 3.4 | - | 1.1 | 1.0 | 1.0 | - | - | 6.4 | 16.8 | 14.2 |
| 20 Apr 2021 | Promocija plus | 1,400 | 27.1 | 18.7 | 7.7 | 7.0 | 9.0 | - | 2.2 | | 1.0 | 1.3 | 1.0 | 1.4 | 1.4 | - | - | - | 6.5 (Note: incl. 1.4% for BM365 and 1.0% for NS R) | 15.7 | 8.4 |
| 4 Apr 2021 | Promocija plus | 1,300 | 26.8 | 19.3 | 7.9 | 7.6 | 8.2 | 1.0 | 1.3 | | 1.3 | 1.5 | 1.0 | 1.2 | 1.5 | 1.0 | - | - | 6.1 (Note: incl. 1.2% for BM365 and 1.0% for NS R) | 14.3 | 7.5 |
| 25 Mar 2021 | Ipsos | 993 | 29.1 | 16.0 | 6.2 | 7.3 | 9.4 | 1.0 | 1.6 | | - | 2.1 | 1.1 | - | 1.3 | 2.3 | - | - | 5.9 (Note: incl. 1.0% for SIP) | 16.6 | 13.1 |
| 20 Mar 2021 | Promocija plus | 1,400 | 27.3 | 18.8 | 8.1 | 7.5 | 8.7 | - | 1.8 | | 1.2 | 1.1 | - | 1.2 | 1.2 | - | - | - | 7.0 (Note: incl. 1.5% for BM365) | 16.1 | 8.5 |
| 7 Mar 2021 | Promocija plus | 1,300 | 27.0 | 19.5 | 7.5 | 7.2 | 8.3 | - | 1.4 | | 1.5 | 1.2 | - | 1.1 | 1.1 | - | - | - | 8.4 (Note: incl. 2.1% for BM365 and 1.2% for NS R) | 15.8 | 7.5 |
| 25 Feb 2021 | Ipsos | 990 | 30.9 | 17.2 | 6.8 | 8.0 | 9.3 | 1.3 | 2.1 | | - | 1.2 | - | 1.4 | 1.4 | - | - | - | 7.1 | 13.3 | 13.7 |
| 7 Feb 2021 | Promocija plus | 1,300 | 27.7 | 19.9 | 7.2 | 7.3 | 8.3 | - | 2.1 | | - | 1.0 | - | 1.6 | 1.5 | - | - | - | 7.8 (Note: incl. 1.3% for BM365) | 15.6 | 7.8 |
| 25 Jan 2021 | Ipsos | 987 | 31.1 | 16.6 | 7.3 | 7.8 | 9.6 | 1.3 | 3.0 | | 1.5 | 2.0 | - | 1.6 | - | 2.1 | - | - | 7.8 | 8.3 | 14.5 |
| 10 Jan 2021 | Promocija plus | 1,300 | 28.0 | 19.6 | 6.3 | 7.4 | 8.4 | - | 2.9 | | - | - | - | 1.6 | 1.3 | - | - | - | 9.0 (Note: incl. 1.2% for BM365) | 15.5 | 8.4 |
2021
| 24 Dec 2020 | Ipsos | 991 | 30.8 | 16.2 | 9.4 | 8.3 | 8.6 | 1.1 | 4.3 | | 1.8 | 1.4 | - | 1.2 | - | 2.3 | 1.2 | - | 8.3 (Note: incl. 1.3% for SIP) | 5.1 | 14.6 |
| 6 Dec 2020 | Promocija plus | 1,300 | 29.2 | 20.5 | 7.9 | 8.7 | 6.4 | - | 2.2 | | - | 1.7 | - | 1.7 | 1.6 | - | - | - | 6.7 (Note: incl. 1.0% for BM365) | 13.4 | 8.7 |
| 25 Nov 2020 | Ipsos | 983 | 31.5 | 17.6 | 7.5 | 7.4 | 6.5 | 1.1 | 3.6 | - | - | 1.4 | 1.2 | 2.1 | 1.6 | 1.7 | - | - | 6.3 | 10.5 | 13.9 |
| 8 Nov 2020 | Promocija plus | 1,300 | 29.1 | 19.8 | 7.3 | 8.6 | 7.6 | - | 1.5 | 2.3 | - | 1.4 | - | 1.4 | 2.1 | - | - | - | 6.1 (Note: incl. 1.0% for BM365) | 12.8 | 9.3 |
| 26 Oct 2020 | Ipsos | 983 | 32.5 | 18.7 | 8.4 | 7.3 | 6.7 | - | 3.8 | 1.4 | - | 2.1 | - | 1.4 | 1.6 | 1.5 | - | - | 4.7 | 9.9 | 12.8 |
| 8 Oct 2020 | Promocija plus | 1,300 | 30.4 | 18.2 | 8.2 | 8.4 | 9.0 | - | 1.0 | 2.8 | - | 1.0 | - | 1.2 | 1.4 | - | - | - | 6.0 (Note: incl. 1.0% for BM365) | 12.4 | 12.2 |
| 25 Sep 2020 | Ipsos | 989 | 33.7 | 17.1 | 7.9 | 6.2 | 8.2 | - | 2.7 | 1.8 | - | 1.1 | - | 1.5 | 1.3 | 1.0 | - | - | 5.7 | 11.8 | 16.6 |
| 6 Sep 2020 | Promocija plus | 1,300 | 32.8 | 18.4 | 7.8 | 7.6 | 8.9 | - | 2.1 | 2.0 | - | - | - | 1.3 | 1.4 | - | - | - | 6.5 | 11.2 | 14.4 |
| 25 Aug 2020 | Ipsos | 981 | 33.1 | 16.4 | 6.1 | 7.0 | 8.6 | - | 3.4 | 2.0 | - | 1.7 | 1.0 | 2.0 | 1.5 | 1.5 | - | - | 5.8 | 9.9 | 16.7 |
| 6 Aug 2020 | Promocija plus | 1,300 | 32.9 | 18.1 | 8.6 | 8.3 | 11.0 | - | 1.3 | 2.6 | - | - | - | 1.2 | 1.3 | - | - | - | - | - | 14.8 |
| 25 Jul 2020 | Ipsos | 989 | 30.2 | 18.4 | 6.9 | 8.2 | 8.7 | | 1.9 | 1.9 | - | 2.0 | - | 1.9 | 1.3 | 1.2 | - | - | 8.6 (Note: incl. 1.4% for BM365 and 1.0% for NS R) | 8.8 | 11.8 |
| 5 Jul 2020 | 2020 elections | 1,705,686 | 37.3 | 24.9 | 10.9 | 7.4 | 7.0 | | 4.0 | | | 2.3 | 1.3 | (Note: with SDP) | - | - | (Note: with DP) | (Note: part of SDP until split in the party) | 4.9 (Note: incl. 1.0% for NS R and 0.6% for BM365) | - | 12.4 |

== Coalition standings ==
Poll results published by major national televisions are listed in the table below in reverse chronological order, showing the most recent first, and using the date of publication. The highest percentage figure in each polling survey is displayed in bold, and the background shaded in the leading coalition's color. In the instance that there is a tie, then no figure is shaded. The lead column on the right shows the percentage-point difference between the two coalitions with the highest figures. When a specific poll does not show a data figure for a coalition, the coalition's cell corresponding to that poll is shown empty.
Exit poll

| Date of publication | Polling Firm | HDZ | SDP | DP | M | M ! | Others | Undecided | Lead |
|---|---|---|---|---|---|---|---|---|---|
| **17 Apr 2024** | **Final Result** | **34.4** | 25.4 | 9.6 | 8.0 | 9.1 | 13.5 | - | 9.0 |
| 25 Mar 2024 | IPSOS | **28.6** | 22.6 | 8.9 | 7.4 | 7.4 | - | - | 6.0 |
| 20 Mar 2024 | Promocija Plus | **29.1** | 25.2 | 7.1 | 7.1 | 7.7 | - | - | 3.9 |
| 13 Mar 2024 | Promocija Plus | **26.8** | 21.6 | 8.2 | 8.4 | 8.8 | - | - | 5.2 |

=== Seat projections (without Diaspora) ===
| Date of publication | Polling Firm | HDZ | SDP | DP | M | M ! | IDS | F | NPS | Lead |
|---|---|---|---|---|---|---|---|---|---|---|
| **17 Apr 2024** | **Final Result** | 58 | 42 | 14 | 11 | 10 | 2 | 1 | 2 | 16 |
| 17 Apr 2024 | IPSOS 19:00 UTC+2 | 59 | 43 | 13 | 11 | 10 | 2 | 1 | 1 | 16 |
| 11−14 Apr 2024 | Promocija plus | 60 | 44 | 13 | 9 | 8 | 3 | 1 | 2 | 16 |
| 11−14 Apr 2024 | IPSOS | 60 | 41 | 15 | 9 | 11 | 2 | 1 | 1 | 19 |
| 22 Mar−11 Apr 2024 | 2x1 komunikacije | 58 | 49 | 9 | 11 | 8 | 2 | 2 | 1 | 9 |
| 6−10 Apr 2024 | Promocija Plus | 60 | 44 | 14 | 9 | 9 | 2 | 1 | 1 | 16 |

=== Per electoral district ===
==== 1st Electoral district ====
| Date of publication | Polling Firm | HDZ | SDP | DP | M | M ! | F | Others | Undecided | Lead |
|---|---|---|---|---|---|---|---|---|---|---|
| 17 Apr 2024 | 2024 election | **27.7** | 24.4 | 9.3 | 7.4 | 19.9 | 3.4 | 7.9 | - | 3.3 |
| 14 Apr 2024 | Promocija plus | **28.5** | 21.5 | 6.5 | 5.2 | 14.8 | - | - | - | 7.0 |
| 14 Apr 2024 | IPSOS | **26.2** | 21.2 | 6.4 | 5.4 | 18.6 | 3.6 | - | 10.7 | 5.0 |
| 10 Apr 2024 | Promocija plus | **26.8** | 22.3 | 6.7 | 5.2 | 13.5 | 2.9 | - | - | 4.5 |
| 22 Mar 2024 | 2x1 komunikacije | 27.0 | **29.5** | 6.8 | 7.8 | 10.0 | 3.0 | - | 12.0 | 2.5 |

===== Seat projections =====
| Date of publication | Polling Firm | HDZ | SDP | DP | M | M ! | F | Lead |
|---|---|---|---|---|---|---|---|---|
| 17 Apr 2024 | 2024 election | **5** | 4 | 1 | 1 | 3 | 0 | 1 |
| 14 Apr 2024 | Promocija plus | **5** | 4 | 1 | 1 | 3 | 0 | 1 |
| 14 Apr 2024 | IPSOS | **5** | 4 | 1 | 1 | 3 | 0 | 1 |
| 10 Apr 2024 | Promocija plus | **5** | 4 | 1 | 1 | 3 | 0 | 1 |
| 22 Mar 2024 | 2x1 komunikacije | **5** | **5** | 1 | 1 | 2 | 0 | Tie |

==== 2nd Electoral district ====
| Date of publication | Polling Firm | HDZ | SDP | DP | M | M ! | F | Others | Undecided | Lead |
|---|---|---|---|---|---|---|---|---|---|---|
| 17 Apr 2024 | 2024 election | **35.3** | 24.8 | 11.1 | 9.1 | 8.6 | 2.8 | 8.3 | - | 10.5 |
| 14 Apr 2024 | Promocija plus | **32.6** | 21.5 | 8.3 | 7.0 | 7.3 | 3.8 | - | - | 11.1 |
| 14 Apr 2024 | IPSOS | **30.2** | 19.8 | 12.5 | 10.7 | 8.4 | 3.0 | - | 10.6 | 10.4 |
| 10 Apr 2024 | Promocija plus | **31.4** | 20.6 | 9.0 | 7.4 | 7.5 | 2.6 | - | - | 10.8 |
| 7 Apr 2024 | 2x1 komunikacije | **35.5** | 25.0 | 5.8 | 9.0 | 6.5 | 5.8 | 3.6 | 8.8 | 10.5 |

===== Seat projections =====
| Date of publication | Polling Firm | HDZ | SDP | DP | M | M ! | F | Lead |
|---|---|---|---|---|---|---|---|---|
| 17 Apr 2024 | 2024 election | **6** | 4 | 2 | 1 | 1 | 0 | 2 |
| 14 Apr 2024 | Promocija plus | **7** | 4 | 1 | 1 | 1 | 0 | 3 |
| 14 Apr 2024 | IPSOS | **6** | 3 | 2 | 2 | 1 | 0 | 2 |
| 10 Apr 2024 | Promocija plus | **6** | 4 | 2 | 1 | 1 | 0 | 2 |
| 7 Apr 2024 | 2x1 komunikacije | **6** | 4 | 1 | 1 | 1 | 1 | 2 |

==== 3rd Electoral district ====
| Date of publication | Polling Firm | HDZ | SDP | DP | M | M ! | F | NPS | Others | Undecided | Lead |
|---|---|---|---|---|---|---|---|---|---|---|---|
| 17 Apr 2024 | 2024 election | 27.6 | **36.8** | 5.1 | 3.8 | 6.2 | 0.9 | 12.2 | 7.4 | - | 9.2 |
| 13 Apr 2024 | IPSOS | 28.8 | **34.9** | 4.7 | 4.6 | 6.7 | - | 7.3 | 2.5 | 7.3 | 6.1 |
| 12 Apr 2024 | Promocija plus | 25.0 | **35.9** | 5.0 | - | 4.4 | - | 10.0 | - | - | 10.9 |
| 6 Apr 2024 | Promocija plus | 25.2 | **35.2** | 5.6 | 4.2 | 4.5 | - | 9.3 | 3.5 | 12.7 | 10.0 |
| 28 Mar 2024 | 2x1 komunikacije | 26.0 | **40.0** | 2.8 | 5.3 | 5.5 | 1.5 | 6.0 | 3.5 | 10.0 | 14.0 |

===== Seat projections =====
| Date of publication | Polling Firm | HDZ | SDP | DP | M | M ! | F | NPS | Lead |
|---|---|---|---|---|---|---|---|---|---|
| 17 Apr 2024 | 2024 election | 5 | **6** | 0 | 0 | 1 | 0 | 2 | 1 |
| 13 Apr 2024 | IPSOS | 5 | **7** | 0 | 0 | 1 | 0 | 1 | 2 |
| 12 Apr 2024 | Promocija plus | 4 | **7** | 1 | 0 | 0 | 0 | 2 | 3 |
| 6 Apr 2024 | Promocija plus | 5 | **7** | 1 | 0 | 0 | 0 | 1 | 2 |
| 28 Mar 2024 | 2x1 komunikacije | 4 | **7** | 0 | 1 | 1 | 0 | 1 | 3 |

==== 4th Electoral district ====
| Date of publication | Polling Firm | HDZ | SDP | DP | M | M ! | Others | Undecided | Lead |
|---|---|---|---|---|---|---|---|---|---|
| 17 Apr 2024 | 2024 election | **41.8** | 25.2 | 13.1 | 6.0 | 5.5 | 8.4 | - | 16.6 |
| 13 Apr 2024 | Promocija plus | **37.9** | 21.9 | 12.2 | 5.0 | 5.2 | - | - | 16.0 |
| 13 Apr 2024 | IPSOS | **37.3** | 22.0 | 13.0 | 6.7 | 5.2 | 2.5 | 10.5 | 15.3 |
| 6 Apr 2024 | Promocija plus | **36.1** | 22.6 | 12.2 | 5.0 | 5.1 | - | 2.0 | 13.5 |
| 2 Apr 2024 | 2x1 komunikacije | **36.5** | 26.8 | 12.3 | 8.3 | 3.0 | 3.3 | 9.3 | 9.7 |

===== Seat projections =====
| Date of publication | Polling Firm | HDZ | SDP | DP | M | M ! | Lead |
|---|---|---|---|---|---|---|---|
| 17 Apr 2024 | 2024 election | **7** | 4 | 2 | 1 | 0 | 3 |
| 13 Apr 2024 | Promocija plus | **7** | 4 | 2 | 0 | 1 | 3 |
| 13 Apr 2024 | IPSOS | **7** | 4 | 2 | 1 | 0 | 3 |
| 6 Apr 2024 | Promocija plus | **7** | 4 | 2 | 0 | 1 | 3 |
| 2 Apr 2024 | 2x1 komunikacije | **6** | 5 | 2 | 1 | 0 | 1 |

==== 5th Electoral district ====
| Date of publication | Polling Firm | HDZ | SDP | DP | M | M ! | UZ | Others | Undecided | Lead |
|---|---|---|---|---|---|---|---|---|---|---|
| 17 Apr 2024 | 2024 election | **42.8** | 19.6 | 17.4 | 8.5 | 3.6 | 2.1 | 6.0 | - | 23.2 |
| 13 Apr 2024 | Promocija plus | **37.3** | 19.5 | 15.0 | 5.4 | 3.5 | 3.9 | - | - | 17.8 |
| 13 Apr 2024 | IPSOS | **39.3** | 16.9 | 19.2 | 5.7 | 4.2 | - | 2.5 | 8.7 | 22.4 |
| 7 Apr 2024 | Promocija plus | **36.4** | 20.1 | 15.9 | 5.8 | 2.3 | 3.8 | 7.3 | 12.2 | 16.3 |
| 4 Apr 2024 | 2x1 komunikacije | **44.3** | 16.5 | 16.0 | 9.3 | 2.8 | - | 4.1 | 7.0 | 27.8 |

===== Seat projections =====
| Date of publication | Polling Firm | HDZ | SDP | DP | M | M ! | Lead |
|---|---|---|---|---|---|---|---|
| 17 Apr 2024 | 2024 election | **7** | 3 | 3 | 1 | 0 | 4 |
| 13 Apr 2024 | Promocija plus | **7** | 3 | 3 | 1 | 0 | 4 |
| 13 Apr 2024 | IPSOS | **7** | 3 | 3 | 1 | 0 | 4 |
| 7 Apr 2024 | Promocija plus | **7** | 3 | 3 | 1 | 0 | 4 |
| 4 Apr 2024 | 2x1 komunikacije | **7** | 3 | 3 | 1 | 0 | 4 |

==== 6th Electoral district ====
| Date of publication | Polling Firm | HDZ | SDP | DP | M | M ! | F | Others | Undecided | Lead |
|---|---|---|---|---|---|---|---|---|---|---|
| 17 Apr 2024 | 2024 election | **24.8** | 23.8 | 8.7 | 9.5 | 18.1 | 7.8 | 7.3 | - | 1.0 |
| 14 Apr 2024 | Promocija plus | **27.1** | 21.0 | 8.0 | 4.9 | 14.2 | 4.8 | - | - | 6.1 |
| 14 Apr 2024 | IPSOS | **22.8** | 21.5 | 6.4 | 7.5 | 18.9 | 6.8 | - | 11.8 | 1.3 |
| 9 Apr 2024 | Promocija plus | **26.8** | 22.2 | 4.4 | 8.7 | 12.0 | 4.5 | - | - | 4.6 |
| 25 Mar 2024 | 2x1 komunikacije | **27.3** | 25.3 | 4.8 | 7.0 | 14.8 | 5.3 | - | 11.8 | 2.0 |

===== Seat projections =====
| Date of publication | Polling Firm | HDZ | SDP | DP | M | M ! | F | Lead |
|---|---|---|---|---|---|---|---|---|
| 17 Apr 2024 | 2024 election | **4** | **4** | 1 | 1 | 3 | 1 | Tie |
| 14 Apr 2024 | Promocija plus | **5** | 4 | 1 | 1 | 2 | 1 | 1 |
| 14 Apr 2024 | IPSOS | **4** | **4** | 1 | 1 | 3 | 1 | Tie |
| 9 Apr 2024 | Promocija plus | **5** | 4 | 1 | 1 | 2 | 1 | 1 |
| 25 Mar 2024 | 2x1 komunikacije | **5** | **5** | 0 | 1 | 2 | 1 | Tie |

==== 7th Electoral district ====
| Date of publication | Polling Firm | HDZ | SDP | DP | M | M ! | F | Others | Undecided | Lead |
|---|---|---|---|---|---|---|---|---|---|---|
| 17 Apr 2024 | 2024 election | **41.3** | 25.4 | 8.6 | 6.6 | 6.9 | 1.6 | 9.6 | - | 15.9 |
| 12 Apr 2024 | Promocija plus | **33.4** | 21.6 | 8.7 | 4.9 | 5.2 | - | - | - | 11.8 |
| 12 Apr 2024 | IPSOS | **32.7** | 21.2 | 11.2 | 5.0 | 4.7 | - | 13.1 | 12.1 | 11.5 |
| 10 Apr 2024 | 2x1 komunikacije | **38.8** | 23.8 | 6.0 | 5.3 | 5.0 | - | - | 7.3 | 15.0 |
| 9 Apr 2024 | Promocija plus | **32.6** | 22.0 | 9.4 | 4.9 | 5.4 | 2.6 | - | 14.0 | 10.5 |

===== Seat projections =====
| Date of publication | Polling Firm | HDZ | SDP | DP | M | M ! | F | Lead |
|---|---|---|---|---|---|---|---|---|
| 17 Apr 2024 | 2024 election | **7** | 4 | 1 | 1 | 1 | 0 | 3 |
| 12 Apr 2024 | Promocija plus | **6** | 4 | 2 | 1 | 1 | 0 | 2 |
| 12 Apr 2024 | IPSOS | **7** | 4 | 2 | 1 | 0 | 0 | 3 |
| 10 Apr 2024 | 2x1 komunikacije | **7** | 4 | 1 | 1 | 1 | 0 | 3 |
| 9 Apr 2024 | Promocija plus | **6** | 4 | 2 | 1 | 1 | 0 | 2 |

==== 8th Electoral district ====
| Date of publication | Polling Firm | HDZ | SDP | DP | M | M ! | IDS | RF | UZ | Others | Undecided | Lead |
|---|---|---|---|---|---|---|---|---|---|---|---|---|
| 17 Apr 2024 | 2024 election | 21.3 | **33.4** | 4.0 | 5.7 | 10.2 | 15.9 | 2.8 | 2.0 | 4.7 | - | 12.1 |
| 12 Apr 2024 | Promocija plus | 18.9 | **29.8** | 4.1 | 5.7 | 4.4 | 13.1 | 4.4 | - | - | - | 10.9 |
| 12 Apr 2024 | IPSOS | 17.6 | **26.1** | 5.3 | 4.5 | 9.4 | 13.0 | 3.1 | - | 6.9 | 14.1 | 8.5 |
| 11 Apr 2024 | 2x1 komunikacije | 19.5 | **31.0** | 4.8 | 6.5 | 7.0 | 13.0 | 4.5 | 1.5 | - | 10.5 | 11.5 |
| 7 Apr 2024 | Promocija plus | 18.2 | **30.8** | 3.5 | 5.0 | 5.2 | 12.1 | 4.1 | 3.8 | 3.5 | 13.8 | 11.9 |

===== Seat projections =====
| Date of publication | Polling Firm | HDZ | SDP | DP | M | M ! | IDS | Lead |
|---|---|---|---|---|---|---|---|---|
| 17 Apr 2024 | 2024 election | 4 | **6** | 0 | 1 | 1 | 2 | 2 |
| 12 Apr 2024 | Promocija plus | 4 | **6** | 0 | 1 | 0 | 3 | 2 |
| 12 Apr 2024 | IPSOS | 4 | **5** | 1 | 0 | 2 | 2 | 1 |
| 11 Apr 2024 | 2x1 komunikacije | 4 | **6** | 0 | 1 | 1 | 2 | 2 |
| 7 Apr 2024 | Promocija plus | 4 | **6** | 0 | 1 | 1 | 2 | 2 |

==== 9th Electoral district ====
| Date of publication | Polling Firm | HDZ | SDP | DP | M | M ! | Others | Undecided | Lead |
|---|---|---|---|---|---|---|---|---|---|
| 17 Apr 2024 | 2024 election | **39.7** | 19.4 | 10.6 | 12.1 | 4.4 | 13.8 | - | 20.3 |
| 11 Apr 2024 | Promocija plus | **36.2** | 19.5 | 7.6 | 7.4 | 4.0 | - | - | 17.3 |
| 11 Apr 2024 | IPSOS | **37.5** | 15.9 | 10.3 | 8.3 | 3.1 | - | - | 21.6 |
| 11 Apr 2024 | 2x1 komunikacije | **36.8** | 23.0 | 4.8 | 10.3 | 3.5 | - | 9.0 | 13.8 |
| 8 Apr 2024 | Promocija plus | **37.8** | 18.1 | 6.1 | 8.0 | 4.0 | 12.0 | 14.0 | 19.7 |

===== Seat projections =====
| Date of publication | Polling Firm | HDZ | SDP | DP | M | M ! | Lead |
|---|---|---|---|---|---|---|---|
| 17 Apr 2024 | 2024 election | **7** | 3 | 2 | 2 | 0 | 4 |
| 11 Apr 2024 | Promocija plus | **8** | 4 | 1 | 1 | 0 | 4 |
| 11 Apr 2024 | IPSOS | **8** | 3 | 2 | 1 | 0 | 5 |
| 11 Apr 2024 | 2x1 komunikacije | **7** | 5 | 0 | 2 | 0 | 2 |
| 8 Apr 2024 | Promocija plus | **8** | 4 | 1 | 1 | 0 | 4 |

==== 10th Electoral district ====
| Date of publication | Polling Firm | HDZ | SDP | DP | M | M ! | F | Others | Undecided | Lead |
|---|---|---|---|---|---|---|---|---|---|---|
| 17 Apr 2024 | 2024 election | **37.0** | 25.5 | 10.8 | 11.5 | 5.3 | 0.5 | 9.4 | - | 11.5 |
| 11 Apr 2024 | Promocija plus | **33.7** | 21.7 | 9.1 | 10.4 | 4.4 | - | - | - | 12.0 |
| 11 Apr 2024 | IPSOS | **32.7** | 23.2 | 8.2 | 8.9 | 5.5 | - | - | 10.0 | 9.5 |
| 8 Apr 2024 | Promocija plus | **34.0** | 19.5 | 9.0 | 10.9 | 4.0 | - | - | 13.2 | 14.5 |
| 5 Apr 2024 | 2x1 komunikacije | **38.8** | 27.8 | 5.5 | 9.8 | 3.3 | 2.5 | - | 9.0 | 11.0 |

===== Seat projections =====
| Date of publication | Polling Firm | HDZ | SDP | DP | M | M ! | F | Lead |
|---|---|---|---|---|---|---|---|---|
| 17 Apr 2024 | 2024 election | **6** | 4 | 2 | 2 | 0 | 0 | 2 |
| 11 Apr 2024 | Promocija plus | **7** | 4 | 1 | 2 | 0 | 0 | 3 |
| 11 Apr 2024 | IPSOS | **7** | 4 | 1 | 1 | 1 | 0 | 3 |
| 8 Apr 2024 | Promocija plus | **7** | 4 | 1 | 2 | 0 | 0 | 3 |
| 5 Apr 2024 | 2x1 komunikacije | **7** | 5 | 1 | 1 | 0 | 0 | 2 |

== Polling for prime minister ==
On 24 December 2023, Dnevnik.hr of Nova TV, started publishing polling about voters preference on the next prime minister.

| Publication date | Polling firm | Votes | Plenković | Milanović | Grbin | Penava | Grmoja | Raspudić | Benčić | Vanđelić | Nobody | No response | Others | Undecided | Lead |
|---|---|---|---|---|---|---|---|---|---|---|---|---|---|---|---|
| 25 Mar 2024 | Ipsos | 1,000 | 31.7 | 23.5 | - | - | 8.3 | - | 9.9 | - | - | - | 14.9 | 9.0 | 8.2 |
| 17 Mar 2024 | Ipsos | 604 | 30.0 | 32.0 | - | - | 8.0 | - | 12.0 | 3.0 | 15.0 | | | | 2.0 |
| 15 Mar 2024 | Croatian president Zoran Milanović entered the race as SDP candidate for Prime Minister | | | | | | | | | | | | | | |
| 24 Feb 2024 | Ipsos | 679 | 27.0 | - | 6.3 | 7.4 | - | - | 10.1 | | 0.8 | 3.4 | 24.5 | 20.5 | 16.9 |
| 26 Jan 2024 | Ipsos | 995 | 20.4 | - | 6.0 | 6.7 | - | - | 8.2 | | - | - | 19.6 | 32.6 | 12.2 |
2024
| 24 Dec 2023 | Ipsos | 674 | 26.5 | - | 7.0 | 11.2 | - | 4.9 | 9.9 | | 0.3 | 4.4 | 15.1 | 20.7 | 15.3 |
