= 2024 Zagreb protest =

2024 civil protest against ruling Croatian party

Zagreb protest
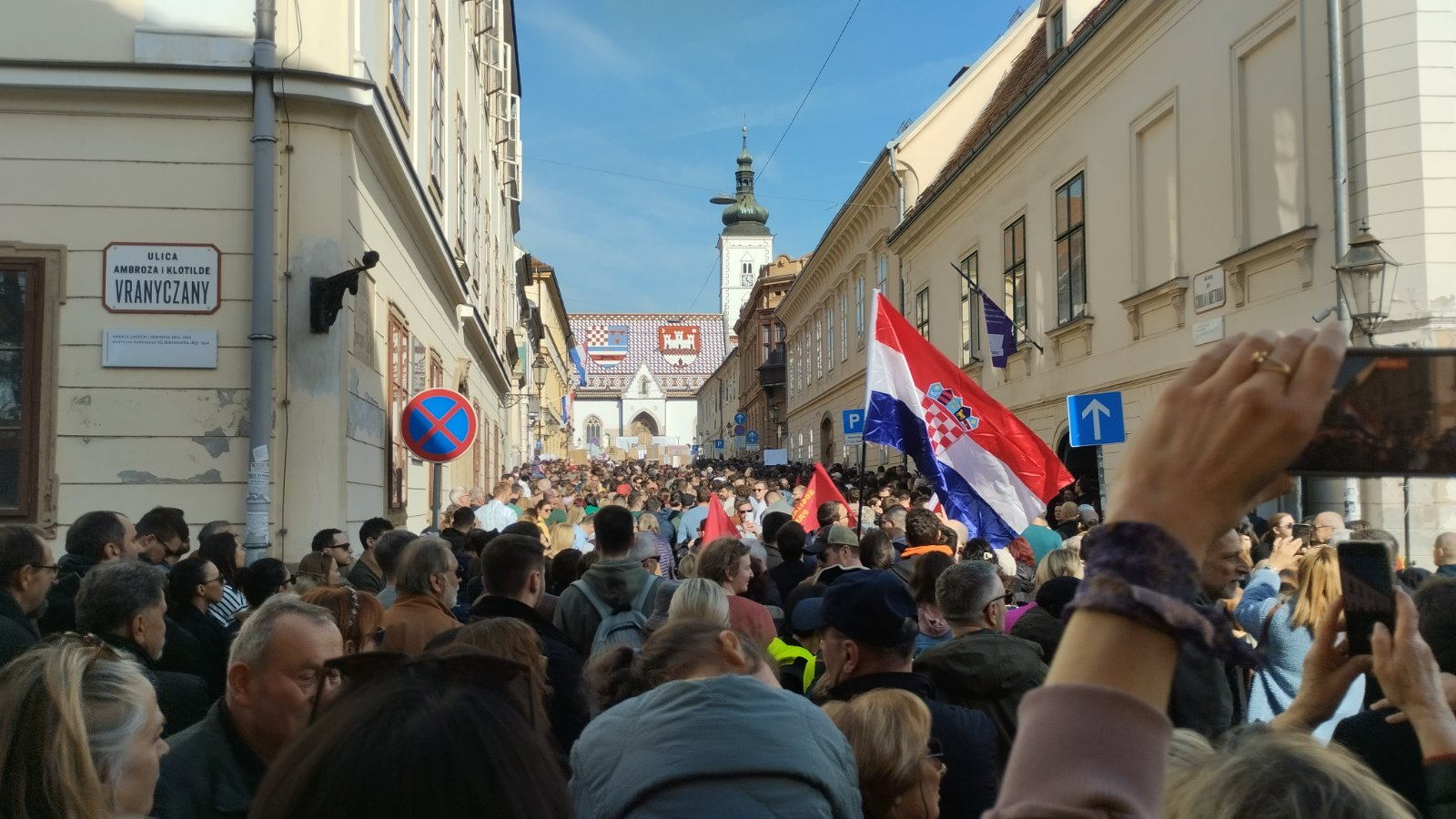
- Protesters in Ćilirometodska street
- Date: 17 February 2024
- Location: St. Mark's Square, Zagreb, Croatia; 45°48′59″N 15°58′26″E
- Caused by: Plenković government corruption scandals; appointment of Ivan Turudić to position of State Attorney of Croatia
- Goals: prevention of corruption and usurpation of power
- Methods: Demonstrations

Parties
11 opposition left-liberal parties: We Can! – Political Platform; Social Democratic Party; Workers' Front; Centre; Party with a First and Last Name; Civic Liberal Alliance; Croatian Peasant Party; Istrian Democratic Assembly; Focus; Social Democrats; People's Party – Reformists	Government of Croatia

Lead figures
No centralised leadership	Andrej Plenković

Number
c. 7,000	

Casualties
- Injuries: 1
- Arrested: 1

On 17 February 2024, a political protest was organized in Zagreb, Croatia, by a coalition of 11 left-wing and liberal opposition parties (We Can! – Political Platform, Social Democratic Party, Workers' Front, Centre, Party with a First and Last Name, Civic Liberal Alliance, Croatian Peasant Party, Istrian Democratic Assembly, Focus, Social Democrats, People's Party – Reformists) against the government of Andrej Plenković and the Croatian Democratic Union. The protest was held under the name "Enough! Let's go to the elections!" (Croatian: Dosta je! Odmah na izbore!).

== Background ==
The protest was sparked by Plenković's appointment of judge Ivan Turudić to the position of State Attorney of Croatia. His appointment is controversial (among other things), due to his connections with people indicted by Croatian judicial bodies, some of whom (such as Josipa Rimac) are former members of the ruling Croatian Democratic Union party. Rimac was indicted for corruption by Croatian institutions and according to the leak published by Jutarnji list exchanged hundreds of WhatsApp messages with Turudić in a period between 2016 and 2020. In some of the leaked messages Rimac and Turudić apparently sweet-talked to each other by calling themselves "my beautiful" and "my joy". On another occasion, judge Turudić apparently met in a car during the night with Zdravko Mamić who then under supervision of Croatian Security and Intelligence Agency and who was subsequently sentenced to prison by Croatian courts and is currently a fugitive in Bosnia and Herzegovina. According to writing of Croatian daily Večernji list, at the time of their night meeting, Turudić was president of a court where Mamić was trialed at.

Upon announcement of Turudić's appointment, president of Croatia Zoran Milanović described it as an attack on Croatian institutions. He went on to accuse Plenković of trying to place State's Attorney Office of the Republic of Croatia under the political control of current government. Opposition politician Dalija Orešković called appointment "an end of independent judicial system". Parliamentarians belonging to left wing We Can! party protested in front of Croatian Sabor while Turudić was voted in by a parliament majority. We Can! MP Ivana Kekin accused prime minister Plenković of taking the country to the course of Orban's Hungary and Vučić's Serbia. She also called Turudić "Croatian Democratic Unions's boy". We Can's! prime minister candidate Sandra Benčić announced organization of large protest against the appointment "on next Saturday". Meanwhile, 11 political parties also announced joining the protest.

Prime minister Plenković, on the other hand, defended the appointment of Turudić by saying that Turudić passed several security checks of Security and Intelligence Agency. Parliamentary opposition asked for a thematic session of Sabor Judiciary Committee dedicated to Turudić issue, however, the ruling majority dismissed such idea and reiterated that Turudić was appointed "legally and transparent".

Nikola Grmoja, a distinguished member of The Bridge - an opposition conservative party declared that their party will not be joining the protest, albeit they support a citizens right to protest. According to him, the organizers signaled them that they are not welcome due to their beliefs about illegal migrations. Two days prior to the protest, another distinguished Bridge member Nino Raspudić talked about a future protest as a "left wing election campaign rally".

On 15 February 2024, president of High Criminal Court of Croatia, with approval of president Supreme court of Croatia filed a complaint against Ivan Turudić for breaking a Codex of judicial ethics. According to this report, Turudić met several times with people who were under investigation, thus violating the Codex.

== The protest ==
The protest started on 17 February 2024 at 11 am CET and gathered more than 5,000 people. The protesters demanded for "prevention of corruption, crime, embezzlement of funds" and "Croatian Democratic Union's usurpation of power". Some of the speakers on the protest included politicians Sandra Benčić, Dalija Orešković, Katarina Peović, Anka Mrak-Taritaš, Krešo Beljak, Peđa Grbin, Ivica Puljak, actor Janko Popović Volarić, singer Ivanka Mazurkijević, film producer and director Dana Budisavljević. During the protest, the leader of Social Democrats - Davorko Vidović - also expressed the "deepest respect to the sacrifice of Alexei Navalny".

== Reactions ==
- Prime minister of Croatia Andrej Plenković commented the protest by calling it "a rally of radical left" accompanied by "vulgar and primitive messages that come as a result of Milanović's savagery". He also called the rally "pro-Russian".
- Minister of Croatian War Veterans Tomo Medved stated that the only program of the protest was a hatred towards the Croatian Democratic Union and the government.
- Croatian philosopher and political analyst Žarko Puhovski gave the protest a mixed review by saying that the protest "wasn't a spectacular success", but it was success on 3 levels: by mobilizing significant number of people, being done on a decent level (with no vulgar messages) and by demonstrating that there is a potential to end the current situation.

== See also ==
- 2019 Croatian protests
