= 2024 Croatian parliamentary election =

- 17 April 2024
- All 151 seats in the Croatian Parliament; 76 seats needed for a majority
- Opinion polls
- Turnout: 62.31% (▲15.87pp)
Party	Leader	Vote %	Seats	+/–
HDZ-led coalition	Andrej Plenković	34.42	61	−6
Rivers of Justice	Peđa Grbin (Note: Zoran Milanović was the unofficial prime minister nominee)	25.40	42	+2
DP-led coalition	Ivan Penava	9.56	14	+2
Možemo!	Sandra Benčić (Note: as a prime minister nominee)	9.10	10	+5
Most–HS	Nikola Grmoja	8.02	11	−1
Focus–Republic	Damir Vanđelić	2.25	1	0
IDS–PGS	Dalibor Paus	2.25	2	−1
NPS	Matija Posavec	1.22	2	New
Minority lists
SDSS	Milorad Pupovac	89.00	3	0
DZMH	Róbert Jankovics	100	1	0
Kali Sara	Veljko Kajtazi	62.11	1	0
BZ	Armin Hodžić	47.04	1	New
Independents	–	–	2	0
This lists parties that won seats. See the complete results below.
Result by constituency
Prime Minister before	Prime Minister after
Andrej Plenković; HDZ	Andrej Plenković; HDZ

Parliamentary elections were held in Croatia on 17 April 2024 to elect the members of the eleventh Sabor. Prior to the elections, the government consisted of a coalition of the Croatian Democratic Union and Independent Democratic Serb Party, with parliamentary support of five national minority MPs, two MPs from the Croatian Social Liberal Party and Croatian Demochristian Party, and one independent MP, Silvano Hrelja.

The ruling centre-right HDZ won the most seats for the fourth straight election, defeating the centre-left Rivers of Justice alliance. The right-wing populist Homeland Movement finished third, with the left-wing and green We Can! in fourth place. The HDZ subsequently formed a right-wing coalition with the Homeland Movement and returned HDZ leader Andrej Plenković as Prime Minister for a third term.

== Background ==
The pre-election period was marked by speculation about the possible date of the election, potential coalitions and unification of the opposition, as well as accusations of corruption and nepotism in the government led by Prime Minister Andrej Plenković and his changes in ministers.

=== Changes of ministers in the government ===
Plenković's two governments were marked by many changes in ministerial positions, a total of 30 ministers. Of its initial lineup in 2016, only Nina Obuljen Koržinek (Minister of Culture and Media), the Deputy Prime Minister Oleg Butković (Minister of the Sea, Transport and Infrastructure), and the Deputy Prime Minister Tomo Medved (Minister of Croatian Veterans) remained. The Bridge ministers Vlaho Orepić (Minister of the Interior), Ante Šprlje (Minister of Justice), and Slaven Dobrović (Minister of Environmental Protection and Energy) were the first to leave the government. They were dismissed by Plenković for refusing to reject the vote of no confidence in Zdravko Marić (Finance Minister) requested by the opposition. Immediately afterwards, fourth The Bridge member Ivan Kovačić (Minister of Administration) resigned from the government, as did Pavo Barišić (Minister of Education) who was facing accusations of plagiarism which were later dismissed by the University of Augsburg.

Scandals occurred in 2018, which began with the Borg affair that led to the departure of Economy Minister Martina Dalić and her replacement by Darko Horvat, who was incarcerated in Remetinec prison in 2022 after being charged with illegally awarding 2.6 million Kuna. Davor Ivo Stier (Minister of Foreign Affairs) resigned after a disagreement with the party leadership, and his successor Marija Pejčinović Burić left in 2019 after being elected Secretary General of the Council of Europe. In 2019, five ministers left the government following a series of scandals. Lovro Kušćević (Minister of Construction and Spatial Planning) after it was found that he conducted illegal real estate brokerage while he was the mayor of Nerežišća on Brač, Goran Marić (Minister of State Property) resigned after a series of real estate scandals. An indictment against Gabrijela Žalac (Minister of Regional Development and European Union Funds) was brought for abuse of position and authority in the "Software affair", and her name was also mentioned in the Vjetroelektrana affair with Josipa Rimac. Tomislav Tolušić (Minister of Agriculture) was mentioned in numerous scandals and was later indicted for embezzlement with EU funds, including 2.5 million Kuna for his winery, which he received under irregular circumstances. Nada Murganić (Minister of Demography, Family, Youth and Social Policy) was dismissed for unsatisfactory performance.

More controversies occurred in 2020, with Milan Kujundžić (Minister of Health) leaving the government following a series of real estate scandal. Damir Krstičević (Minister of Defence) resigned after the crash of a military training plane in which two members of the Croatian Air Force died near Biljana Donje near Zadar. He was replaced by Mario Banožić, who left after committing manslaughter while driving irresponsibly. Marko Pavić was removed as Ministry of Regional Development and EU Funds, along with Gari Cappelli (Minister of Tourism). Vesna Bedeković was replaced as Minister for Demography, Family, Youth and Social Policy by Josip Aladrović, who himself was under investigation by USKOK and also resigned. Nataša Tramišak was replaced as Minister of Regional Development and European Union Funds by Šime Erlić as part of Plenković's personal intentions. Ivan Paladina, Minister of Spatial Planning, Construction and State Property, was removed due to the slow pace of reconstruction after Zagreb and Petrinja earthquakes.

=== Election date ===
In 2023, it was reported that the HDZ was preparing to hold elections in April 2024, two months before the elections for members of the European Parliament. From conversations with several high-ranking HDZ members, Jutarnji list reported that that Andrej Plenković would collect advantages with which he will go before the voters and ask for another prime ministerial mandate in the next year, so that the elections can be held before the Easter holidays in 2024.

On 28 February 2024, Jutarnji list reported that HDZ planned to hold the General Assembly on 17 March 2024 in the Vatroslav Lisinski Concert Hall in Zagreb, three months before the deadline. Information subsequently began to circulate that the Parliament could be dissolved on 22 March, the last day of the 21st session of the Croatian Parliament, and the dissolution could be voted on. On 8 March, Plenković confirmed the dissolution of parliament on 14 March.

On 14 March 2024, the Parliament unanimously voted to dissolve itself, without specifying a date for the election. The following day, president Zoran Milanović announced that elections will be held on 17 April. For the first time, the election will be held on a Wednesday, while the 2000 Croatian parliamentary election was held on a Monday.

=== Pre-election events ===
The first pre-election coalition was agreed by The Bridge and Croatian Sovereignists on 8 July 2023, with an open spot for other parties ranging from the center to the right including the Homeland Movement. Ivan Penava (DP) did not decline the possibility but instead called for Most to join a coalition with DP. After that DP entered a short-lived alliance with the Croatian Democratic Peasant Party on 16 December 2023. On 27 March 2024, DP concluded an agreement with Law and Justice, a party which emerged following the unification of The Key of Croatia, Let's Change Croatia and Independent list of Mislav Kolakušić. On the other hand, Most and HS decided to enlarge coalition with the Independent Youth List (NLM) on 22 March 2024.

On 28 July 2023, a coalition was agreed between two liberal regional parties, the Istrian Democratic Assembly and the Alliance of Primorje-Gorski Kotar, with a main goal to represent Istria and Kvarner in VII and VIII electoral districts. The coalition will also contest the 2024 European Parliament elections. Two more liberal parties, Focus and the People's Party – Reformists announced their cooperation on 10 November 2023. The leader of the Reformists Radimir Čačić said that with a high level of certainty they expect a large expansion of this cooperation with parties close to them, who believe that Croatia is institutionally and as a society trapped by the HDZ, and that this should be stopped and space should be opened for a different, much more modern, more liberal Croatia. Finally two groups made one single alliance on 9 December 2023. Four party leaders: Davor Nađi (Focus), Dalibor Paus (IDS), Radimir Čačić (NS-R) and Darijo Vasilić (PGS) pointed out that they are running against the HDZ and that after the elections they will not participate in the government with the HDZ, although Čačić did not rule out the possibility of supporting a minority government. On 5 March 2024, the coalition was formally constituted under the name "For Better Croatia". The coalition later collapsed after Focus decided to ally with the Republic party of Damir Vanđelić, while the Reformists still partnered with IDS and PGS in VII. and VIII constituencies and with the Rivers of Justice coalition in other constutuencues.

Social Democratic Party dissidents led by Davorko Vidović as leader of Social Democrats made an agreement with the Croatian Peasant Party on 7 October 2023, creating the "Our Croatia" (Croatian: Naša Hrvatska) coalition. Ten days later Croatian Labourists – Labour Party joined coalition emphasizing this is just continued cooperation and trust. On 2 March 2024, the Democrats joined the coalition, claiming that they recognized the great potential for positive change as well as the courage and ability to gather broadly on the left and center. HSS left the coalition on 5 March 2024 and joined the Rivers of Justice on 22 March 2024. On 27 March 2024 "Our Croatia" announced a deal with the IDS, PGS and the NPS in III, VII and VIII electoral districts.

The most anticipated coalition of the 2024 election was an alliance of the main opposition party Social Democratic Party of Croatia and left wing contender We Can! (Možemo!). Such an idea was seen as probable because of similar policies of the parties. We Can! announced on 27 June 2023 that it would run separately, leaving the possibility after the election to form a government with parties of the center to the left, including the SDP. On 1 March 2024, Sandra Benčić (We Can!) announced the start of negotiations with the SDP on a "dotted coalition", which means a coalition in constituencies where they do not have enough support individually. In that case, the coalition would be implemented in IV., V., VII. and IX. electoral unit, while in other units the parties would go separately. On 22 March 2024 Možemo and SDP announced that an agreement was not reached, which means that they will go separately in all constituencies.

On 17 February 2024, members of the left-liberal opposition held a protest under the name "Enough! Let's Go to the Elections!" (Croatian: Dosta je! Odmah na izbore!). The protest was organized by SDP, We Can!, Centre, IDS, HSS and RF, Focus, SD, NS-Reformists, GLAS, and SsIP. The reason for the protest was the appointment of Judge Ivan Turudić as the Attorney General. The day before, the same parties submitted a request for the dissolution of parliament and the holding of early elections. Most and HS joined them with signatures even if they did not participate in the protests. The next protest was held on 23 March 2024 simultaneously in Zagreb, Split, Rijeka, Osijek and Varaždin.

On 5 March 2024, a large left-liberal future coalition named For a Better Croatia was announced after an inter-party meeting. The coalition will be led by the SDP with Peđa Grbin as prime ministerial candidate and will include Focus, NS R, PGS, IDS, Centre, HSS, Glas, RF, and SsIP. On 6 March, IDS and PGS claimed there will be no coalition in VIII electoral district with other parties than Focus and NS-R, per previous agreements. On 17 March, Grbin announced that the Workers' Front would not be part of the coalition, while the Istrian Democratic Assembly, Alliance of Primorje-Gorski Kotar and Fokus left the coalition on 19 March, citing Milanović's candidacy, which is not in accordance with the law, as the reason. After the collapse of the coalition, the remaining parties reached an agreement on going to the elections under the Rivers of Justice coalition.

Following the creation of the opposition coalition, HDZ announced that it would cooperate with HSLS, HDS, HNS, and HSU in some electoral districts. Hours after announcing the election date on 15 March, President Zoran Milanović announced at a press conference that he would be the SDP's candidate for prime minister in the elections, during which he would run against incumbent prime minister Andrej Plenković in electoral district I. On 18 March, the Constitutional Court ruled that Milanović may not be a candidate nor could he actively participate in support of the SDP during the election campaign, unless he resigns from the presidency of Croatia. In response, Milanović described the ruling as "done in a gangster way". Ahead of the election, researchers from the Faculty of Political Science of University of Zagreb have developed an online electoral compass test in cooperation with Kieskompas, which positions the main political parties and the user, based on a set of questions, on the political spectrum.

== Electoral system ==
Electoral districts in use from 2023

The 151 members of the Croatian Parliament are elected from 10 geographical and two special electoral districts:

- 140 seats are elected in ten geographical 14-seat electoral districts (1st–10th Electoral Districts) by open list proportional representation (using a 5% electoral threshold) with seats allocated using the d'Hondt method
  - A voter can give their "preference vote" to a single candidate on the list, but only candidates who have received at least 10% of the party's votes take precedence over the other candidates on the list.
- 3 seats are elected in a special electoral district (11th Electoral District) for Croatian citizens living abroad
- 8 seats are elected from an electoral district for national minorities (12th Electoral District): 3 seats for Serbian, 1 seat for Italian, 1 seat for Hungarian, 1 seat for Czech and Slovak, 1 seat for Albanian, Bosniak, Macedonian, Montenegrin and Slovenian, and 1 seat for Austrian, Bulgarian, German, Jewish, Polish, Roma, Romanian, Rusyn, Russian, Turkish, Ukrainian and Vlach national minority
  - Voters with the right to vote in the 12th Electoral District can choose to either vote for a candidate list on the ballot in the district they belong to according to their place of residence (one of the 10 geographical districts) or for a candidate of their minority in the 12th Electoral District.

On 28 October 2022, the Constitutional Court issued a warning that it could declare the next elections unconstitutional unless the electoral law was changed, due to excessive differences in the number of voters for each constituency, leading to significant variations in vote weight. On 7 February 2023, the Constitutional Court repealed the electoral law because the difference in vote weight between different electoral districts was too large to comply with the constitutional provision that each vote must be of equal weight. Parliament passed a new electoral law on 20 October 2023, which came into effect on 3 November, requiring the next elections to be held with reorganized electoral districts.

=== Submission of candidate lists ===
Lists for the election of representatives may be proposed independently by one political party or by two or more political parties (coalition list) which are registered in the Republic of Croatia on the day the Decision to call the elections is announced, or by voters. Voters shall propose independent candidate lists on the basis of validly collected 500 signatures of residents of the Electoral District the list is running in.

== Parliamentary parties ==
The table below lists political parties represented in the 10th Sabor prior to the election.

Parties		Ideology	Leader	Seats		Status
Parties		Ideology	Leader	Last election	Before election	Status
HDZ	Croatian Democratic Union	Conservatism	Andrej Plenković	61 / 151	61 / 151	Governing coalition
SDP	Social Democratic Party of Croatia	Social democracy	Peđa Grbin	34 / 151	13 / 151	Opposition
SD	Social Democrats	Social democracy	Davorko Vidović	split from SDP	11 / 151	Opposition
Most	The Bridge	Social conservatism	Božo Petrov	8 / 151	8 / 151	Opposition
DP	Homeland Movement	Croatian nationalism	Ivan Penava	11 / 151	5 / 151	Opposition
HS	Croatian Sovereignists	Souverainism	Marijan Pavliček	3 / 151	4 / 151	Opposition
Možemo!	We Can! – Political Platform	Green politics	Sandra Benčić, Tomislav Tomašević	4 / 151	4 / 151	Opposition
SDSS	Independent Democratic Serb Party	Serb minority politics	Milorad Pupovac	3 / 151	3 / 151	Governing coalition
IDS	Istrian Democratic Assembly	Istrian regionalism	Dalibor Paus	3 / 151	2 / 151	Opposition
HSS	Croatian Peasant Party	Agrarianism	Krešo Beljak	2 / 151	2 / 151	Opposition
HSLS	Croatian Social Liberal Party	Conservative liberalism	Dario Hrebak	2 / 151	2 / 151	Support
HDS	Croatian Demochristian Party	Christian democracy	Goran Dodig	1 / 151	2 / 151	Support
Fokus	Focus	Classical liberalism	Davor Nađi	1 / 151	2 / 151	Opposition
Centar	Centre	Social liberalism	Ivica Puljak	merger of Pametno and IP	1 / 151	Opposition
DO i SIP	Dalija Orešković and People with a First and Last Name	Anti-corruption	Dalija Orešković	1 / 151 successor of IP	1 / 151	Opposition
RF	Workers' Front	Democratic socialism	Collective leadership	1 / 151	1 / 151	Opposition
HNS-LD	Croatian People's Party – Liberal Democrats	Social liberalism	Mirko Korotaj	1 / 151	1 / 151	Support
NL	New Left	Social democracy	Ivana Kekin	1 / 151	1 / 151	Opposition
GLAS	Civic Liberal Alliance	Social liberalism	Anka Mrak-Taritaš	1 / 151	1 / 151	Opposition
NS-R	People's Party – Reformists	Liberalism	Radimir Čačić	1 / 151	1 / 151	Opposition
BLOK	Bloc for Croatia	Croatian nationalism	Zlatko Hasanbegović	1 / 151	1 / 151	Opposition
PH	Righteous Croatia	Croatian nationalism	Milan Vrkljan	split from DP	1 / 151	Opposition
OIP	Determination and Justice	Croatian nationalism	Karolina Vidović Krišto	split from DP	1 / 151	Opposition

== Electoral lists ==
On 30 March 2024, the State Electoral Commission of the Republic of Croatia (DIP) made decisions on validly submitted lists in I. – XI. electoral district and validly proposed candidates in XII. electoral district. All decisions on validly submitted lists and validly proposed candidates and summary lists were published on the same day at 5:00 p.m. on the website of the DIP. The table below is a list of the main parties and electoral coalitions which are contesting the election.

Coalition	Parties	Leading candidate	Ideology	Position	2020 result		Seats at dissolution	Gov.
Coalition	Parties	Leading candidate	Ideology	Position	Votes (%)	Seats	Seats at dissolution	Gov.
HDZ-led coalition	List: Croatian Democratic Union (HDZ); Croatian Social Liberal Party (HSLS); Croatian People's Party (HNS); Croatian Demochristian Party (HDS); Croatian Party of Pensioners (HSU); Bandić Milan 365 – Labour and Solidarity Party (BM365); Croatian Democratic Alliance of Slavonia and Baranja (HDSSB); Marijana Petir (Ind. MP)	Andrej Plenković	Conservatism; Christian democracy Pro-Europeanism	Centre-right	38.56%	67 / 151	68 / 151	check
Rivers of Justice	List: Social Democratic Party of Croatia (SDP); Centre (CENTAR); Croatian Peasant Party (HSS); Civic Liberal Alliance (GLAS); Dalija Orešković and People with a First and Last Name (DO i SIP); Reformists (NS-R) (Note: running on Our Croatia list in the 8th Electoral district); Green Alternative – Sustainable Development of Croatia; Lista za Rijeku - Lista per Fiume (RI); Bojan Glavašević (Ind. MP)	Peđa Grbin	Social democracy Social liberalism Pro-Europeanism	Centre to centre-left	24.87% (Restart); 3.98% (IP–P–F)	40 / 151	20 / 151	X mark
DP-led coalition	List: Homeland Movement (DP); Law and Justice (PiP); Bloc for Croatia (BLOK); Green List (ZL)	Ivan Penava	National conservatism Right-wing populism	Right-wing to far-right	10.89%	12 / 151	6 / 151	X mark
The Bridge–Sovereignists	List: The Bridge (MOST); Croatian Sovereignists (HS); Independent Youth List (NLM)	Nikola Grmoja	Social conservativism Economic liberalism Souverainism	Centre-right to right-wing	7.39%	12 / 151	12 / 151	X mark
Možemo!	List: We Can! (M!) – New Left (NL) – Zagreb is Ours! (ZJN!) – Srđ je grad! (SJG!); Hoćemo pravedno! (HP)	Sandra Benčić	Progressivism; Green politics	Centre-left to left-wing	6.99% (Green–Left)	4 / 151	4 / 151	X mark
Our Croatia	List: Social Democrats (SD); Croatian Labourists (HL); Democrats (D); Istrian Democratic Assembly (IDS) (Note: IDS and PGS are running with a separate list from the rest of the Our Croatia coalition, but together with NS-R, in the 7th Electoral district); Alliance of Primorje-Gorski Kotar (PGS); Independent Platform of the North (NPS) (Note: pact with Our Croatia; running independently in the 3rd Electoral district with support of the coalition)	Davorko Vidović	Social democracy Social liberalism Regionalism	Centre to centre-left	part of Restart	3 / 151	14 / 151	X mark
Focus–Republic	List: Focus (FOKUS); Republic (Republika)	Damir Vanđelić	Classical liberalism Economic liberalism	Centre	3.98% (IP–P–F)	2 / 151	2 / 151	X mark
Workers' Front	List: Workers' Front (RF)	None (Note: The party neither has a leader in general (Collective leadership) nor did it announce a PM candidate; Katarina Peović is the party's only MP and de facto spokesperson)	Democratic socialism Left-wing populism Progressivism	Left-wing to far-left	part of Green–Left	1 / 151	1 / 151	X mark
For Homeland	List: Croatian Party of Rights (HSP); Croatian Pulse (HB); Croatian Democratic Peasant Party (HDSS)	Nikica Augustinović; Željko Glasnović	Croatian ultranationalism National conservatism	Far-right	0.44% (Note: Glasnović also won 20.97% as an independent candidate in the 11th Electoral district)	0 / 151	1 / 151	X mark

Party/Coalition	I	II	III	IV	V	VI	VII	VIII	IX	X	XI	Submitted
Most – HS – HKS – NLM	x	x	x	x	x	x	x	x	x	x		27 March 2024.
Most											x	27 March 2024.
Independent list of Viktor Šimunić			x									27 March 2024.
MDS			x									27 March 2024.
SDP – CENTAR – HSS – DO i SIP – GLAS							x	x				28 March 2024.
SDP – CENTAR – HSS – DO i SIP – NS R – GLAS	x	x	x	x	x	x			x	x		28 March 2024.
IDS – PGS – UK – ISU – SD – NS R – D – HL SR								x				28 March 2024.
NS R – PGS – IDS – UK – SHU							x					28 March 2024.
OIP	x	x	x	x	x	x	x	x	x	x	x	28 March 2024.
SHZ									x			28 March 2024.
DP – PiP – Blok – Agrameri	x											28 March 2024.
DP – PiP – nezavisni – DHSS – ZL				x								28 March 2024.
DP – PiP – DHSS – ZL			x				x					28 March 2024.
DP – PiP					x			x	x	x		28 March 2024.
DP – PiP – DHSS – ZL – Agrameri		x				x						28 March 2024.
Fokus – Republika	x	x	x	x	x	x	x	x	x	x	x	28 March 2024.
AP – AS							x		x			28 March 2024.
HSGO			x			x	x					28 March 2024.
NPS			x									29 March 2024.
PMH	x					x						29 March 2024.
UZ – SU – BUZ – DSU	x	x	x	x	x	x	x	x	x	x		29 March 2024.
PH	x			x								29 March 2024.
HDZ – HSLS – HDS – HNS – HSU	x	x	x	x	x	x	x	x	x	x		29 March 2024.
HDZ											x	29 March 2024.
Ričard nezavisni									x	x		29 March 2024.
RF	x	x	x	x	x	x	x	x	x	x		29 March 2024.
Možemo – HP		x	x	x	x		x					29 March 2024.
Možemo	x					x		x	x		x	29 March 2024.
Možemo – SJG										x		29 March 2024.
SD – HL SR – D							x					29 March 2024.
SD – IDS – PGS – HL SR – D	x	x		x	x	x			x	x		29 March 2024.
HB											x	29 March 2024.
HSP AS									x			29 March 2024.
A-HSP	x	x	x	x	x	x	x	x	x	x	x	29 March 2024.
SIP	x	x	x	x	x	x	x	x	x	x	x	29 March 2024.
DA										x		29 March 2024.
HSP – HB – HDSS	x	x	x	x	x	x	x	x	x	x		29 March 2024.
Independent list of Damir Kristijan Rogina						x						29 March 2024.
AS – AP	x	x			x							29 March 2024.
SRP								x		x		29 March 2024.
JD	x				x				x	x		29 March 2024.

=== 12th Electoral District ===
Candidate, Party	Ser	Hun	Ita	CzS	xYu	Oth	Submitted
Armin Hodžić, Bošnjaci zajedno!					x		18 March
Veljko Kajtazi, SRRH "Kali Sara"						x	18 March
Franjo Horvat, "Udruga Roma korak po korak"						x	23 March
Elvis Kralj, Independent						x	24 March
Róber Jankovics, DZMH		x					27 March
Ermina Lekaj Prljaskaj, UARH					x		27 March
Furio Radin, Independent			x				27 March
Vladimir Bilek, Independent				x			27 March
Šoip Šoipi, Independent					x		28 March
Ivan Komak, MSO				x			28 March
Srđan Milaković, DSS	x						28 March
Milorad Pupovac, SDSS	x						29 March
Dragana Jeckov, SDSS	x						29 March
Anja Šimpraga, SDSS	x						29 March
Sulejman Tabaković, Independent					x		29 March
Corrado Dussich, Independent			x				29 March
Dragan Crnogorac, Independent	x						29 March

=== Female representation ===
It is required by the election law that each list running in the election contains at least 40% of both men and women, to ensure equality. For the lists that do not adhere to this rule, the State Electoral Commission (DIP) will report them to The Ombudsperson for Gender Equality and the State's Attorney Office of the Republic of Croatia (DORH) when the parties and candidates proposing those lists can expect a fine of up to 33 000 euros.

Thirty-two out of 165 lists did not respect the rule and will be reported. A number of the main parties respected the rule and have at least six women and men on all their lists, among them Focus/Republic (11 lists), MOST/HS (11), RF (10), the Rivers of Justice coalition (10) and the Our Croatia coalition (eight). On the other hand, the biggest offenders are HDZ, DP/PiP coalition and MP Karolina Vidović Krišto's party OiP. For both HDZ and OiP, the fine could be high as much as 60 000 euros all together. When asked about this, Andrej Plenković responded: "There are many more women than 30, but the circumstances are such that we have a lot of candidates, we try to balance it ... ."

While We Can! holds the record for the most women holding the first place on their lists (six constituencies), HDZ and DP/PiP have none.

== Campaign ==
The official political campaign started on 30 March with the DIP publishing all of the valid lists. It will last until the end of 15 April as the election silence is enforced. It starts at midnight and lasts until 7:00 pm on the election day when the polling stations close and exit polls are published.

The campaign was marked by increased social media advertising and content creation. Many politicians have, in order to appeal to young voters, joined social media platforms like TikTok, among the most prominent ones being Prime Minister Andrej Plenković and the Diaspora candidate Ljubo Ćesić Rojs. The platforms are still being used mostly for critique, negativity and personal attacks on opponents. Mass buying of bots, specifically HDZ's bot farms from Vietnam, has come to light. On April Fools' Day, We Can! has introduced the first Croatian AI politician Nitkolina (Nikolina being a common name and "nitko" meaning "nobody") to fight fake news and misinformation.

=== Issues ===
On 12 January 2024, President Zoran Milanović publicly outed HDZ minister Damir Habijan as gay. It was the first case of outing a political opponent as part of LGBT community without their approval in the political history of the country. The situation caused a wave of reactions, but LGBT rights organizations did not react and a rift was created between the activists of the community. In April, Zagreb Pride released a controversial list of candidates running who are members of the community. The list of 11 candidates, mostly members of We Can!, included three incumbent HDZ officials who either hadn't publicly announced their orientation before or didn't give permission to be on the list, as well as two SDP candidates. Politicians like Peđa Grbin (SDP) and Damir Vanđelić (Republic) condemned the list.

During the campaign, Zoran Milanović voiced his plan to form a broad "national salvation" coalition government of all parties except the currently governing HDZ. He also urged voters to vote for anyone except HDZ. The Bridge stated that they will form a government with any party which accepts their program and PM candidate Nikola Grmoja. Unlike SDP, We Can! strongly rejected participating in a government with the Most or DP, saying they are the only barrier to the right in government. In case of a gridlock in government formation after the election, they are ready to provide confidence and supply to an SDP minority government from Sabor, with the condition that the right does the same and doesn't enter the new cabinet. Ivan Penava stated that We Can! and SDSS are unacceptable as partners for the Homeland Movement, but not SDP.

During a campaign rally in Split, Andrej Plenković criticized Zoran Milanović, who has espoused supportive stances on Russia, for "pushing Croatia and the Croatian people into the ‘Russian World’". He also compared the Russian invasion of Ukraine to Serbian aggression against Croatia in the 1990s. The numerous political corruption scandals within the government have weakened the HDZ campaign. Some thirty ministers have had to leave the government in eight years because of corruption. The scandal involving private WhatsApp messages of former HDZ official Josipa Rimac with the new State Attorney of Croatia Ivan Turudić, that were one of the causes of the 2024 Zagreb protest, continued during the campaign and this time involved the HDZ Minister of Maritime Affairs, Transport and Infrastructure Oleg Butković. In April, several previously unreleased sets of leaked messages were published by Faktograf.hr that apparently testify to some dubious actions and deal-making by Rimac, involving suspicions of lobbying, influence peddling and nepotism. Butković denied remembering contacts with Rimac. In the messages, Rimac also criticized the former Conflict of Interest Commission presidents Nataša Novaković and Dalija Orešković.

=== Party slogans ===
Party/alliance	Original slogan	English translation	Ref.
HDZ	„Za sve izazove.“	"For all challenges."	
Rivers of Justice	„Rijeke pravde dolaze“	"Rivers of justice are coming"	
Most–HS–NLM	„Na tvojoj strani“	"On your side"	
DP–PiP–BLOK	„Ustani i ostani“	"Rise up and remain"	
Možemo!	„Zamisli drugačiju Hrvatsku“	"Imagine a different Croatia"	
SD–IDS–PGS–D–HL	„Ozbiljno. Za Hrvatsku”	"Seriously. For Croatia"	
Fokus–Republika	„Glas razuma"	"Voice of reason"	
SDSS	„Hrvatska treba Srbe”	"Croatia needs Serbs"	
RF	„Beskompromisno!”	"Uncompromisingly!"	

=== Election debates ===
2024 Croatian parliamentary election debates
Date	Organizers	P Present A Absent invitee I Invitee NI Non-invitee						
Date	Organizers	HDZ	SDP	DP	Most	Možemo	F–R	Refs
20 Feb	Nova TV	P Damir Habijan	P Branko Grčić	P Mario Radić	P Zvonimir Troskot	P Damir Bakić	NI	
5 Mar	Nova TV	P Ivan Malenica	P Mišel Jakšić	P Igor Peternel	P Nikola Grmoja	P Morena Lekan	NI	
19 Mar	Nova TV	P Vili Beroš	P Mišo Krstičević	P Damir Biloglav	P Ivan Bekavac	P Ivana Kekin	NI	
20 Mar	Jutarnji list	P Nikola Mažar	P Siniša Hajdaš Dončić	P Mario Radić	P Nino Raspudić	P Gordan Bosanac	NI	
20 Mar	N1	P Damir Habijan	P Sanja Radolović	P Mario Radić	P Zvonimir Troskot	P Damir Bakić	NI	
27 Mar	N1	P Nikola Mažar	P Dalija Orešković (Note: Debater for Rivers of Justice as part of coalition, member of DO I SIP)	P Igor Peternel	P Nikola Grmoja	P Đuro Capor	NI	
2 Apr	Nova TV	P Marin Piletić	P Arsen Bauk	P Davor Dretar	P Marija Selak Raspudić	P Sandra Benčić	NI	
3 Apr	N1	P Gordan Grlić-Radman	P Ranko Ostojić	P Josip Jurčević	P Nino Raspudić	P Gordan Bosanac	NI	
4 Apr	Večernji list	P Ivan Anušić	P Mišel Jakšić	P Ivan Penava	P Vesna Vučemilović (Note: Debater for Most-HS-HKS-NLM coalition, member of HS)	NI	NI	
5 Apr	Večernji list	P Marko Primorac	P Ivan Račan	P Igor Peternel	P Nikola Grmoja	P Gordan Bosanac	P Davor Nađi	
5 Apr	RTL	NI	NI	P Ivan Penava	P Nikola Grmoja	P Sandra Benčić	NI	
8 Apr	RTL	P Davor Božinović	P Siniša Hajdaš Dončić	P Stipo Mlinarić	P Nino Raspudić	P Gordan Bosanac	NI	
9 Apr	Večernji list	P Gordan Grlić-Radman	P Bojan Glavašević (Note: Debater for Rivers of Justice as part of coalition, Independent)	P Tomislav Josić	P Nino Raspudić	P Danijela Dolenec	NI	
9 Apr	RTL	P Nikola Mažar	P Dalija Orešković	P Ante Šušnjar	P Nikola Grmoja	P Sandra Benčić	NI	
10 Apr	RTL	P Marin Piletić	P Sanja Radolović	P Igor Peternel	P Marija Selak Raspudić	P Danijela Dolenec	NI	
11 Apr	Večernji list	P Davor Ivo Stier	P Arsen Bauk	NI	P Nino Raspudić	P Gordan Bosanac	NI	
12 Apr	Večernji list	P Nina Obuljen Koržinek	P Dalija Orešković	NI	P Marija Selak Raspudić	P Sandra Benčić	NI	

Date	Organizers	HDZ	SDP	DP	Most	Možemo	IDS	F–R	RF	NPS	UZ	Refs
12 Apr	HRT	P Marin Piletić	P Mirela Ahmetović	P Tomislav Josić	P Nikola Grmoja	P Sandra Benčić	P Dalibor Paus	P Davor Nađi	P Katarina Peović	P Matija Posavec	P Milivoj Špika	

Unlike in 2016 and 2020, the leaders of two biggest parties, HDZ and SDP, did not attend a single debate. Peđa Grbin challenged Andrej Plenković to one, but Plenković refused to debate Grbin, as the PM candidate of Rivers of Justice is Zoran Milanović. The Prime Minister refused to debate other political opponents, saying that he doesn't have anyone to debate with. DP leader Ivan Penava and PM candidates Nikola Grmoja (Most) and Sandra Benčić (Možemo!) also challenged Plenković to a debate. Grbin, Grmoja and Benčić all suggested Plenković is afraid and/or called him a coward. To the calls to debate them, Plenković responded by saying: "This is a political match in which Grbin capitulated before the formal campaign, Milanović violates the Constitution, and a political trifle, like Most, is not someone we would confront (in a debate)." Plenković, Grbin and Penava all skipped the big HRT debate, while Grmoja and Benčić attended.

== Opinion polls ==
LOESS curve of the polling for the 2024 Croatian Parliamentary Election excluding undecided.

== Voter turnout ==
Turnout	Time								
Turnout	11:30			16:30			19:00		
Turnout	2020	2024	±	2020	2024	±	2020	2024	±
Total	18.09%	24.18%	▲6.09 pp	34.04%	50.60%	▲16.56 pp	46.44%	62.31%	▲15.87 pp
Sources: Izbori

== Results ==
The election produced a fourth consecutive victory for the governing HDZ; however, the opposition parties denied it a one-party majority in the Sabor. The official results showed that HDZ's coalition won 61 seats, almost 20 seats more than the second placed Rivers of Justice coalition whose 42 candidates were elected. Despite HDZ's plurality of votes, in order to form a governing majority, they still required to rely on forming a coalition, with the most likely partners the third-placed far-right party, the Homeland Movement, which won 14 seats. The Homeland Movement therefore has the kingmaker position, although it declined to say whether they would join a left-leaning or right-leaning bloc and setting the condition that they will not enter into a coalition with SDSS and Možemo.

Among the other opposition parties, conservative The Bridge along with partners Croatian Sovereignists won 11 seats, and the green-left We Can! who won 10, both declared after the vote they intended to start talks with potential allies aimed at putting together some form of majority administration. The latter party also encouraged all smaller parties regardless of political leanings to come to an agreement in order to oust HDZ from power. The Workers' Front failed to achieve the 5% electoral threshold, leaving the party without a representative in the Sabor.

Party	Votes	%	Seats	+/–
Croatian Democratic Union coalition (Note: Of the 61 seat won by the coalition, the Croatian Democratic Union won 55, Croatian Social Liberal Party won two, and Croatian Demochristian Party, Croatian People's Party – Liberal Democrats, Croatian Party of Pensioners and independent Marijana Petir won one each)	729,949	34.42	61	–6
Rivers of Justice (Note: Of the 42 seats won by the coalition, the Social Democratic Party of Croatia won 37, Centre won two, and Croatian Peasant Party, Civic Liberal Alliance, Dalija Orešković and People with a First and Last Name won one each)	538,748	25.40	42	+2
Homeland Movement coalition (Note: Of the 14 seats won by the coalition, the Homeland Movement won 11 and the Law and Justice, independent Željko Lacković and independent Ivan Šipić one each)	202,714	9.56	14	+2
We can!	193,051	9.10	10	+5
The Bridge–Croatian Sovereignists (Note: Of the 11 seats won by the coalition, The Bridge won nine and the Croatian Sovereignists two)	169,988	8.02	11	–1
Focus–Republic (Note: Only seat was won by the Focus)	47,715	2.25	1	0
Istrian Democratic Assembly (Note: Including the IDS-PGS result in the VII district; both seats were won by Istrian Democratic Assembly)	47,655	2.25	2	–1
UZ–SU–BUZ–DSU	40,755	1.92	0	0
Determination and Justice	26,198	1.24	0	New
Independent Platform of the North	25,830	1.22	2	New
Party of Ivan Pernar	19,367	0.91	0	0
HSP–HB–HDSS	18,128	0.85	0	0
Workers' Front	16,869	0.80	0	–1
Agrarian Party–Action for Change	7,051	0.33	0	New
Autochthonous Croatian Party of Rights	6,291	0.30	0	0
Movement for a Modern Croatia	1,684	0.08	0	0
Public Good	1,650	0.08	0	New
Socialist Labour Party of Croatia	1,206	0.06	0	0
Righteous Croatia	1,124	0.05	0	New
Croatian Civil Resistance Party	998	0.05	0	0
Croatian Party of Rights — Dr. Ante Starčević	882	0.04	0	New
Međimurje Democratic Union	762	0.04	0	New
Dalmatian Action	699	0.03	0	New
Party of Croatian Unity	231	0.01	0	New
Independents	21,234	1.00	0	0
Total	2,120,779	100.00	143	0
Valid votes	2,120,779	97.27		
Invalid/blank votes	59,632	2.73		
Total votes	2,180,411	100.00		
Registered voters/turnout	3,523,270	61.89		
Minority lists
Independent Democratic Serb Party			3	0
Bošnjaci zajedno!			1	New
Croatian Romani Union "Kali Sara"			1	0
Democratic Union of Hungarians			1	0
Independents			2	0
Total			8	0
Valid votes	33,914	97.56		
Invalid/blank votes	849	2.44		
Total votes	34,763	100.00		
Source: Results

=== Minority seats ===
Candidate	Party	Votes	%
Serbs
Milorad Pupovac	Independent Democratic Serb Party	11,660	31.60
Anja Šimpraga	Independent Democratic Serb Party	10,842	29.38
Dragana Jeckov	Independent Democratic Serb Party	10,344	28.03
Srđan Milaković	Democratic Alliance of Serbs	2,189	5.93
Dragan Crnogorac	Independent	1,869	5.06
Total		36,904	100.00
Valid votes		15,353	96.37
Invalid/blank votes		579	3.63
Total votes		15,932	100.00
Registered voters/turnout		15,939	99.96
Italians
Furio Radin	Independent	971	50.92
Corrado Dussich	Independent	936	49.08
Total		1,907	100.00
Valid votes		1,907	97.74
Invalid/blank votes		44	2.26
Total votes		1,951	100.00
Registered voters/turnout		1,951	100.00
Hungarians
Róbert Jankovics	Democratic Union of Hungarians of Croatia	2,804	100.00
Total		2,804	100.00
Valid votes		2,804	97.46
Invalid/blank votes		73	2.54
Total votes		2,877	100.00
Registered voters/turnout		2,877	100.00
Czechs and Slovaks
Vladimir Bilek	Independent	1,764	93.04
Ivan Komak	Matica Slovačka Osijek	132	6.96
Total		1,896	100.00
Valid votes		1,896	99.42
Invalid/blank votes		11	0.58
Total votes		1,907	100.00
Registered voters/turnout		1,908	99.95
Albanians, Bosniaks, Montenegrins, Macedonians and Slovenes
Armin Hodžić	Bošnjaci zajedno!	3,357	47.04
Ermina Lekaj Prljaskaj	Union of Albanians of Croatia	2,249	31.51
Šoip Šoipi	Independent	1,414	19.81
Sulejman Tabaković	Independent	117	1.64
Total		7,137	100.00
Valid votes		7,137	99.04
Invalid/blank votes		69	0.96
Total votes		7,206	100.00
Registered voters/turnout		7,213	99.90
Austrians, Bulgarians, Germans, Poles, Roma, Romanians, Ruthenians, Russians, Turks, Ukrainians, Vlachs and Jews
Veljko Kajtazi	Croatian Romani Union "Kali Sara"	3,017	62.12
Franjo Horvat	Udruga Roma "Korak po korak"	1,400	28.82
Elvis Kralj	Independent	440	9.06
Total		4,857	100.00
Valid votes		4,857	98.60
Invalid/blank votes		69	1.40
Total votes		4,926	100.00
Registered voters/turnout		4,931	99.90
Source: Results

=== Results by constituency ===
Constituency	HDZ		Rivers of Justice		DP		Most		Možemo		Our Croatia		F-R	
Constituency	%	Seats	%	Seats	%	Seats	%	Seats	%	Seats	%	Seats	%	Seats
I	27.65	5	24.37	4	9.29	1	7.34	1	19.87	3	0.9	–	3.4	–
II	35.3	6	24.8	4	11.1	2	9.1	1	8.6	1	1.2	–	2.8	–
III	27.6	5	36.8	6	5.1	0	3.8	–	6.2	1	12.2	2	0.9	–
IV	41.8	7	25.2	4	13.1	2	6.0	1	5.5	0	1.0	–	1.0	–
V	42.8	7	19.6	3	17.4	3	8.5	1	3.6	–	0.4	–	1.0	–
VI	24.8	4	23.8	4	8.7	1	9.5	1	18.1	3	0.6	–	7.8	1
VII	41.3	7	25.4	4	8.6	1	6.6	1	6.9	1	1.0	–	1.6	–
VIII	21.3	4	33.4	6	4.0	–	5.7	1	10.2	1	15.9	2	1.9	–
IX	39.7	7	19.4	3	10.6	2	12.1	2	4.4	–	0.9	–	1.0	–
X	37.0	6	25.5	4	10.8	2	11.5	2	5.3	0	0.5	–	0.5	–
XI	79.5	3	–	–	–	–	6.6	0	3.0	–	–	–	0.5	–
Total	34.4	61	25.4	42	9.6	14	8.0	11	9.1	10	3.5	4	2.3	1
Source: Results

== Aftermath ==
Andrej Plenković claimed victory on behalf of the HDZ and said that it would begin the process of forming a new parliamentary majority to form the HDZ's third government on 18 April 2024. He also congratulated other contesting parties. SDP leader Peđa Grbin said that they had hoped for a better result but said that they would also start talks on the formation of a new government on 18 April. During negotiation talks, the DP was labeled the kingmaker of the election.

On 19 April, the Constitutional Court ruled that President Zoran Milanović was ineligible to become prime minister in the event that the SDP would be able to form a government, citing his statements and behavior during the electoral campaign. According to the ruling, he would be barred from being given the mandate to form a new government even if he previously resigned as President. Three of the Constitutional Court judges released a dissenting opinion pointing out there are no specific arguments or regulations to justify the decision. They cited "unconstitutional threats" of the Court and criticized the potential undermining of the will of the people. Milanović gave a statement in front of a photo showing "HDZ's man" Miroslav Šeparović, the Court's President, hanging out together with HDZ ministers Oleg Butković and Branko Bačić, accusing the Court of preparing a coup d'état.

As one of the scenarios for the formation of a new government, Grbin presented the idea of an anti-corruption government. This would imply the constitution of a Parliament in which, at least temporarily, the majority will be all opposition parties (Možemo!, Rivers of Justice, IDS, Fokus, Most, and DP). Such a parliamentary majority could pass several important laws, including the electoral one, as well as annul the appointment of State Attorney Ivan Turudić. After that, in the event that the parties could not agree on the formation of a joint government, new elections could be held.

On 21 April, elections were repeated in two polling stations. The first was in Sračinec, where an excess of ballots was found in the ballot boxes. The irregularity referred to the list of candidates in the XII electoral unit where representatives of the Albanian, Bosniak, Montenegrin, Macedonian and Slovenian national minorities were elected. The second polling station was in Markušica in the village of Ostrovo, where it was discovered that by mistake 83 persons of Serbian nationality voted twice, namely for the V electoral unit and for the candidates of the XII electoral unit of the Serbian national minority.

On 27 April, the DP held negotiation talks with both the HDZ and SDP, with Prime Minister Andrej Plenković announcing that the HDZ would form a formal coalition with the DP some time in "the coming days."

On 29 April, the State Electoral Commission published the final results, setting a deadline to 19 May for holding the first session of the Sabor with president Milanović deciding the exact date.

On 5 May, an agreement was reached on the HDZ and DP government, with Plenković as prime minister. DP will receive three ministries, demography, agriculture, and energy, which will be separated from the Ministry of Economy. Members of the Serb community were excluded from the new cabinet due to opposition from the DP. On 10 May Plenković submitted 78 signatures of representatives at a meeting with president Milanović at the Presidential Palace, after which Milanović gave him a mandate to form the government. The signatures were given by 61 representatives of the HDZ coalition, 12 representatives of the DP, four representatives of minorities and Vesna Vučemilović, who was subsequently expelled from the Croatian Sovereignists. The Sabor issued its approval of the new government in a 79–61 vote on 17 May.

== See also ==
- 2024 European Parliament election in Croatia
- 2024–25 Croatian presidential election
