= 2024 in politics =

These are some of the notable events relating to politics in 2024.

In 2024, approximately 80 countries, representing nearly half of the global population, voted on national governments and legislatures. Various sources have called 2024 the "year of democracy".

== January ==
- 1 January
  - All works published in 1928 (except for sound recordings, from 1923), entered the public domain in the United States.
  - The Republic of Artsakh officially ceases to exist.
  - Ethiopia announces an agreement with Somaliland to use 20 km of coastline in exchange for eventual recognition of Somaliland's Declaration of Independence.
  - BRICS: Egypt, Ethiopia, Iran, Saudi Arabia, and the United Arab Emirates join the BRICS group, doubling the size of the group.
  - 2023 Israeli judicial reform: The Supreme Court of Israel strikes down the "reasonableness" bill passed by the Knesset in July 2023.
  - Same-sex marriage is legalized in Estonia.
- 2 January – Attempted assassination of Lee Jae-myung: South Korean opposition leader Lee Jae-myung is stabbed in the neck in Gadeokdo, Busan.
- 3 January
  - 2023 Sierra Leone coup attempt: A court in Freetown, Sierra Leone, charges former president Ernest Bai Koroma with four offences, including treason for his alleged role in the November 2023 coup attempt.
  - A court in the U.S. state of New York releases unsealed documents containing the associates list of Jeffrey Epstein to the public.
  - Hilda Heine is sworn in as President of the Marshall Islands.
- 4 January – Mohammad Sabah Al-Salem Al-Sabah is appointed as Prime Minister of Kuwait.
- 6 January – 2024 Salvadoran presidential election: Electronic voting for Salvadoran expatriates in the presidential and legislative elections begins.
- 7 January
  - 2024 Bangladeshi general election: Citizens of Bangladesh vote in a general election with opposition parties boycotting the election.
  - Philippine President Bongbong Marcos signs a law that permits electronic tax filing in the country.
- 8 January
  - 2024 Puntland presidential election: Said Abdullahi Deni and Ilyas Osman Lugator win the presidency and vice-presidency respectively.
  - Farmers block highway access roads in parts of Germany, launching a week of protests against a government plan to remove tax breaks on diesel used in agriculture.
  - French prime minister Élisabeth Borne resigns at the request of French president Emmanuel Macron amid political turmoil over immigration reform.
- 13 January – Taiwan, 2024 Taiwanese general election (Presidential and Parliamentary)
- 25 January – Kenneth Eugene Smith, an American convicted murderer, is executed by means of nitrogen hypoxia. He was the first person in the world to be executed by this particular method.
- 26 January – 2024 Tuvaluan general election
- 31 January – Sultan of Johor Ibrahim Iskandar ascends to the throne as the 17th Yang di-Pertuan Agong of Malaysia.

== February ==
- 6 February – Tucker Carlson interviewed Vladimir Putin, which was the first interview Putin granted to a Western journalist since the Russian invasion of Ukraine.
- 8 February - In Pakistan, the 2024 Pakistani general election is held.
- 14 February - In Indonesia, the 2024 Indonesian general election is held.
- 17 February – Zagreb protest
- 25 February - In Belarus, the 2024 Belarusian parliamentary election is held.

== March ==
- 10 March – In Portugal, the 2024 Portuguese legislative election is held.
- 15-17 March - In Russia, the 2024 Russian presidential election is held.
- 19 March – Hong Kong passes Basic Law Article 23, a new additional national security law aligning the city more closely with mainland China.

== April ==
- 4 April - In Kuwait, the 2024 Kuwaiti general election is held.
- 9 April – The European Court of Human Rights rules that countries must better protect their people from climate change in a landmark climate justice case against Switzerland.
- 10 April - In South Korea, the 2024 South Korean legislative election is held.
- 17 April – In Croatia, the 2024 Croatian parliamentary election is held.
- 17 April - In Solomon Islands, the 2024 Solomon Islands general election is held.
- 29 April – In Togo the 2024 Togolese parliamentary election is held.

== May ==
- 5 May - In Panama, the 2024 Panamanian general election is held.
- 19 May - In the Dominican Republic, the 2024 Dominican Republic general election is held.
- 22 May – UK Prime Minister Rishi Sunak calls the 2024 United Kingdom general election, setting the date of July 4.
- 29 May – The 2024 South African general election is held, in which the African National Congress loses its majority for the first time since Apartheid.

== June ==
- 1 June
  - The 2024 Indian general election, begun on April 19, concludes.
  - The 2024 Icelandic presidential election is held, with Halla Tómasdóttir elected president of Iceland.
- 2 June – The 2024 Mexican general election is held.
- 6–9 June – The 2024 European Parliament election is held.
- 9 June – In Belgium, 2024 Belgian federal election is held.
- 9 June - In Bulgaria, June 2024 Bulgarian parliamentary election is held.
- 9 June - In San Marino, 2024 San Marino general election is held.
- 10 June – French president Emmanuel Macron dissolves the national assembly, setting fresh elections for 30 June 2024 (first round) and 7 July 2024 (second round).
- 28 June - In Mongolia, the 2024 Mongolian parliamentary election is held.

== July ==
- 4 July – The 2024 United Kingdom general election is held, with the main opposition Labour Party winning 412 seats, becoming the governing party for the first time in 14 years, switching roles with then-governing party Conservative Party.
- 7 July - In France, the second round in 2024 French legislative election is held.
- 15 July -
  - In Syria, the 2024 Syrian parliamentary election is held.
  - Republican Party nominates three-time presidential candidate Donald Trump as president nominee, with Ohio senator JD Vance as vice-president nominee, during their party's presidential primaries. Trump was the first Republican presidential candidate with successful nominations in three presidential elections since Richard Nixon, and the first with three consecutive nominations since Franklin D. Roosevelt.
- 21 July – U.S. President Joe Biden announces he will not seek re-election and endorses his Vice President, Kamala Harris, to be the Democratic candidate.

== August ==
- August 3 – The Central Committee of the Communist Party of Vietnam elects Tô Lâm as the new General Secretary of the Communist Party of Vietnam (supreme leader of Vietnam), succeeding Nguyễn Phú Trọng, who died on July 19.
- 14/19 August - In Kiribati, the 2024 Kiribati parliamentary election is held.

== September ==
- 10 September - In Jordanian, the 2024 Jordanian general election is held.
- 21 September - In Sri Lanka, the 2024 Sri Lankan presidential election is held.
- 29 September - In Austria, the 2024 Austrian legislative election is held.

== October ==
- 9 October – In Mozambique, the 2024 Mozambican general election is held.
- 13 October – In Lithuania, the 2024 Lithuanian parliamentary election is held.
- 20 October – In Moldova, the 2024 Moldovan presidential election is held.
- 20 October - In Moldova, the 2024 Moldovan European Union membership constitutional referendum is held.
- 26 October – In Georgia, the 2024 Georgian parliamentary election is held.
- 27 October – In Bulgaria the October 2024 Bulgarian parliamentary election is held.
- 27 October - In Japan, the 2024 Japanese general election is held.
- 27 October - In Uruguay, the 2024 Uruguayan general election is held.
- 27 October - In Uzbekistan, the 2024 Uzbek parliamentary election is held.
- 30 October - In Botswana, the 2024 Botswana general election is held.

== November ==
- 5 November – 2024 United States elections were held.
  - 2024 United States presidential election: Donald Trump won a second, non-consecutive term against Kamala Harris, being the second president to do so since Grover Cleveland.
  - 2024 United States Senate elections: Republicans win control of the United States Senate.
  - 2024 United States House of Representatives elections
- 5 November – The 2024 Palauan general election was held and incumbent president Surangel Whipps jr. was re-elected.
- 5 November – The 2024 American Samoan general election was held.
- 10 November – The 2024 Mauritian general election was held.
- 13 November – The 2024 Somaliland presidential election was held.
- 14 November – The 2024 Sri Lankan parliamentary election was held, the victory party of the 2024 presidential election, the NPP, winning 159 seats.
- 17 November – The 2024 Senegalese parliamentary election was held.
- 24 November – First round of the 2024 Romanian presidential election was held.
- 25 November – The 2024 Jubaland presidential election was held.
- 27 November – The 2024 Namibian general election was held.
- 29 November - The 2024 Irish general election was held.
- 30 November – The 2024 Icelandic parliamentary election was held.

== December ==
- 3 December – South Korean president Yoon Suk Yeol declares martial law in a televised address in which he accused the Democratic Party of conducting "anti-state activities." The National Assembly votes unanimously to lift martial law, despite efforts by the South Korean Army to prevent the vote. Yoon and his cabinet then lifted martial law after six hours, and later issues an apology. This declaration would later precipitate both the impeachments of Yoon and Han Duck-soo later that month, with the former being ousted from the office in April the following year, and both would later be convicted in 2026.
- 7 December – 2024 Ghanaian general election was held.

== See also ==
- List of current legislatures
- List of elections in 2024
- List of vice presidents in 2024
