= Independent Platform of the North =

Political party in Croatia

Independent Platform of the North Nezavisna platforma Sjever
- Abbreviation: NPS
- President: Matija Posavec
- Founder: Matija Posavec
- Founded: March 2021
- Split from: Croatian People's Party
- Headquarters: Park Rudolfa Kropeka 2, Čakovec
- Ideology: Regionalism
- Political position: Centre
- National affiliation: Our Croatia (2024)
- Colors: Teal (customary); Green, Blue
- Slogan: "Sjever dolazi" ("The North is coming")
- Sabor: 2 / 151
- European Parliament: 0 / 12
- County Prefects: 1 / 21
- Mayors: 1 / 128

Website
- platformasjever.hr

The Independent Platform of the North (Croatian: Nezavisna Platforma Sjever, NPS) is a regionalist political party in Croatia led by Matija Posavec, the prefect of Međimurje County since 2013. Its headquarters is located in Čakovec. Initially founded as an electoral list under the name Party of Matija Posavec (Stranka Matije Posavca, SMP) in March 2021 prior to that year's local elections, it took on its current name in July 2023.

The party is positioned on the political centre and seeks to gather independent lists from the region.

Posavec was previously a member of the social liberal Croatian People's Party – Liberal Democrats (HNS) and its Međimurje branch leader, until he left in 2019. He resigned as county prefect in September 2021 after a bribery affair was revealed and he was arrested. He initially confessed to accepting a 10 thousand kuna bribe, but later retracted the confession and successfully ran for a new mandate as county prefect in a special election. He was re-elected during the 2021 Croatian local elections in the first round.

NPS won two seats in the Croatian Parliament at the 2024 Croatian parliamentary election. The party was a part of the Our Croatia alliance. After the election, the two NPS deputies formed a joint parliamentary club with the Centre.

== Election results ==
=== Presidential ===
The following is a list of presidential candidates who were endorsed by NPS.

Election year(s)	Candidate	1st round		2nd round		Result
Election year(s)	Candidate	Votes	%	Votes	%	Result
2024	Zoran Milanović (Ind.)	797,938	49.68 (#1)	1,122,859	74.68 (#1)	Won

=== Legislative ===
Election	Coalition	Votes won	Percentage	Seats won	Change	Government
2024	Our Croatia (Note: the sole representative of the coalition in the 3rd district, de facto running independently with the coalition support)	25,830	1.22%	2 / 151	New	Opposition

=== European Parliament ===
Election	List leader	Coalition	Votes	%	Seats	+/–	EP Group
Election	List leader	Coalition	Coalition		NPS		EP Group
2024	Valter Flego	Fair Play List 9 (Note: Including also IDS, SDSS, HSLS, HNS, NS-R, SD, D, PGS and RI.)	41,710	5.54 (#5)	0 / 12	New	–
