= Our Croatia =

Political alliance in Croatia

Our Croatia Naša Hrvatska
- Leader: Davorko Vidović
- Founded: 7 October 2023
- Headquarters: Zagreb, Croatia
- Ideology: Social democracy Social liberalism Regionalism; Faction: Labourism
- Political position: Centre to centre-left
- Slogan: Seriously. For Croatia
- Sabor: 0 / 151

Our Croatia (Croatian: Naša Hrvatska) is a Croatian political alliance that was created on 7 October 2023, initially by the Social Democrats and the Croatian Peasant Party. It has been described as centre-left.

At the time of its founding, Davorko Vidović pointed out that the goal of the alliance is to prevent emigration from Croatia, and in its activities, they emphasize the fight against corruption. The slogan "Seriously for Croatia" was chosen because of Vidović's belief that Croatia "needs responsibility and seriousness more than ever."

The Croatian Peasant Party (HSS), one of the founding parties, left the alliance to join the Rivers of Justice coalition in March 2024.

Davorko Vidović said that the alliance is also open to the membership of prominent individuals and other political parties of the center and left of the center.

On the 27th March 2024 the Our Croatia alliance signed a treaty of cooperation with three regional parties IDS, PGS and Independent Platform of the North.

== Members ==
Party	Abbr.	Ideology	Position	Leader	Seats	Ref.
Social Democrats	SD	Social democracy Progressivism	Centre-left	Davorko Vidović	0 / 151	
Croatian Labourists – Labour Party	HL–SR	Social democracy Labourism	Centre-left	David Bregovac	0 / 151	
Democrats	D	Social democracy Social liberalism	Centre-left	Ivan Lukež	0 / 151	

=== Associate parties ===
Party	Abbr.	Ideology	Position	Leader	Seats	Ref.
Istrian Democratic Assembly	IDS	Istrian regionalism Liberalism	Centre to Centre-left	Dalibor Paus	2 / 151	
Alliance of Primorje-Gorski Kotar	PGS	Regionalism; Liberalism	Centre	Darijo Vasilić	0 / 151	
Independent Platform of the North	NPS	Regionalism	Centre	Matija Posavec	2 / 151	
