= Dalibor Paus =

Croatian politician (born 1973)

President of the Istrian Democratic Assembly
- In office 11 September 2021 – 25 March 2026
- Preceded by: Boris Miletić
- Succeeded by: Loris Peršurić

Member of the Croatian Parliament for 8th electoral district
- Incumbent
- Assumed office 16 May 2024

Personal details
- Born: 18 March 1973 (age 53)
- Party: IDS
- Education: University of Zagreb

Dalibor Paus (born 18 March 1973) is a Croatian politician who is the municipal mayor of Barban and the president of the Istrian Democratic Assembly.

== Before politics ==
Paus graduated in mathematics at the Zagreb University Faculty of Science in Zagreb. He was the headmaster of the Pula Technical School from 2008 to 2016. From February 2016 to June 2017, he was the head of the organization "Center for materials research of Istria County - METRIS".

== Political career ==
Paus entered politics in 2013 as a municipal councilor for the IDS in Barban. A few months later, he was appointed as the president the municipal branch of the IDS. During the 2017 local elections, he defeated incumbent municipal mayor Denis Kontošić in the second round with 56.35% of the vote, becoming the municipal mayor of Braban Municipality. He was elected to a second term in 2021, winning the second round with 58.64% of the vote. During the 34th party congress of the IDS held on 11 September 2021 in Poreč, Paus was elected as the president of the party unopposed. He was elected by 208 out of 211 party delegates. He became the fifth president of the party.

Paus was elected to the Croatian Parliament in the 2024 elections.
