= Sandra Benčić =

Croatian activist and politician (born 1978)

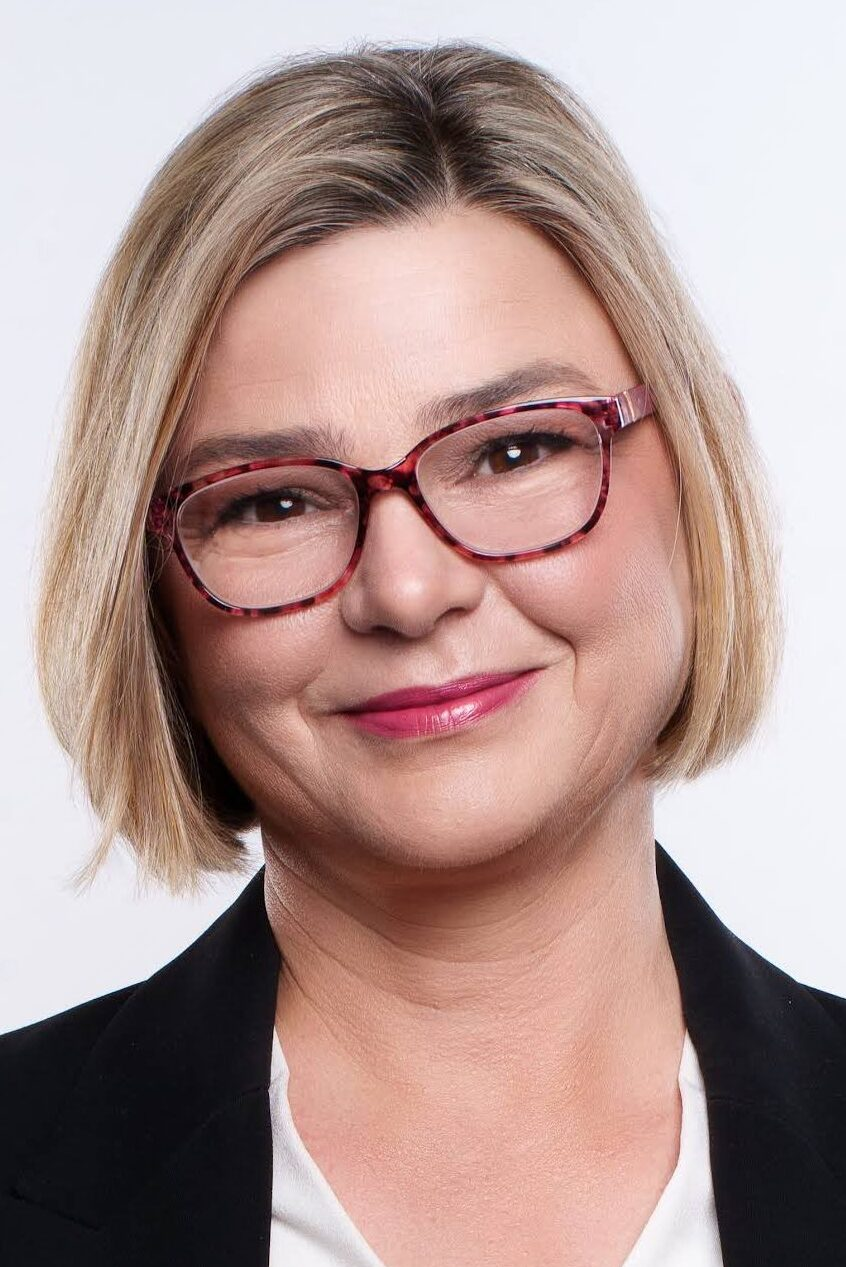
- Benčić in 2024

Coordinator of the We Can! – Political Platform
- Incumbent
- Assumed office 10 February 2019 Serving with Tomislav Tomašević
- Preceded by: Position established

Member of the Croatian Parliament for the 1st constituency
- Incumbent
- Assumed office 22 July 2020

Personal details
- Born: 28 January 1978 (age 48) Zabok, SR Croatia, SFR Yugoslavia (modern Croatia)
- Party: We Can! (since 2019)
- Spouse: Miroslav Petrović
- Children: 2
- Education: University of Zagreb (LL.B.)

Sandra Benčić (born 28 January 1978) is a Croatian politician, civil rights activist, and Member of the Croatian Parliament since 2020. She is a member of the green-left political platform We Can!, which she helped establish in 2019, and has served as one of its two coordinators since 2023 alongside Tomislav Tomašević.

== Early life and education ==
Born in Zabok, Benčić graduated from the Zagreb Faculty of Law in 2014. Before entering parliamentary politics, she was active in civil society organizations and public policy initiatives, particularly in the fields of human rights, social justice, migration, and sustainable development.

Benčić worked with the non-governmental organization Centre for Peace Studies (CMS) until 2018, focusing primarily on issues of inequality and migration. She also gained experience in regional development and European Union funding programs as a co-founder of Razbor, one of Croatia's first consulting firms specializing in EU funds. She remained involved with the company until 2010. In addition, she taught at Algebra University and was among the founders of the human rights foundation Solidarna.

She served on the Croatian Ministry of the Interior's Commission for Handling Complaints and the Council for the Development of Civil Society. Benčić also worked as an external expert for the Council of Europe on issues related to freedom of speech.

In 2017, she signed the Declaration on the Common Language, a regional initiative promoting the shared linguistic heritage of Croats, Serbs, Bosniaks and Montenegrins.

== Political career ==
Benčić participated in the founding of the political platform We Can! in 2019. In the 2020 parliamentary election, she was elected to the Croatian Parliament as one of the leading candidates of the Green–Left Coalition, representing the first electoral district. In Parliament, she became Chair of the Committee on Environment and Nature Protection.

=== 2024 Parliamentary Election ===
On 16 September 2023, the party council of We Can! unanimously selected Benčić as its candidate for Prime Minister in the 2024 parliamentary election. In her acceptance speech, she emphasized social and economic equality, strong public institutions, equal treatment under the law, and a socially just green transition.

In February 2024, Benčić became one of the leading opposition figures protesting the appointment of Ivan Turudić as State Attorney of Croatia. Together with fellow We Can! representatives, she staged a protest outside the Croatian Parliament prior to the confirmation vote. Following Turudić's appointment, Benčić helped organize a large opposition demonstration in Zagreb, attended by thousands of participants, where she criticized corruption and called for political reform.

During the 2024 election campaign, Benčić headed We Can!'s list in the first electoral district. After President Zoran Milanović announced his intention to become a candidate for prime minister on behalf of the Rivers of Justice coalition, Benčić stated that We Can!!'s campaign strategy would remain unchanged. She also argued that Milanović should have resigned from the presidency before actively participating in the election campaign. Although negotiations between We Can! and the Social Democratic Party (SDP) regarding coordinated electoral lists were unsuccessful, both parties expressed willingness to cooperate after the election to challenge the governing Croatian Democratic Union (HDZ). Following the election, she advocated for the formation of a minority government focused on anti-corruption reforms and reducing HDZ's influence in government.

== Personal life ==
Benčić is married to Miroslav Petrović, an employee of the Zagreb Faculty of Political Science. The couple has two sons.

She has cited former Croatian Prime Minister Ivica Račan as a political figure she admired and has expressed appreciation for Finnish politician Sanna Marin. Outside politics, she is a fan of Croatian rock music and has stated that she regularly attends concerts by bands such as Let 3, TBF, and Hladno pivo.
