= Nikola Grmoja =

Croatian politician

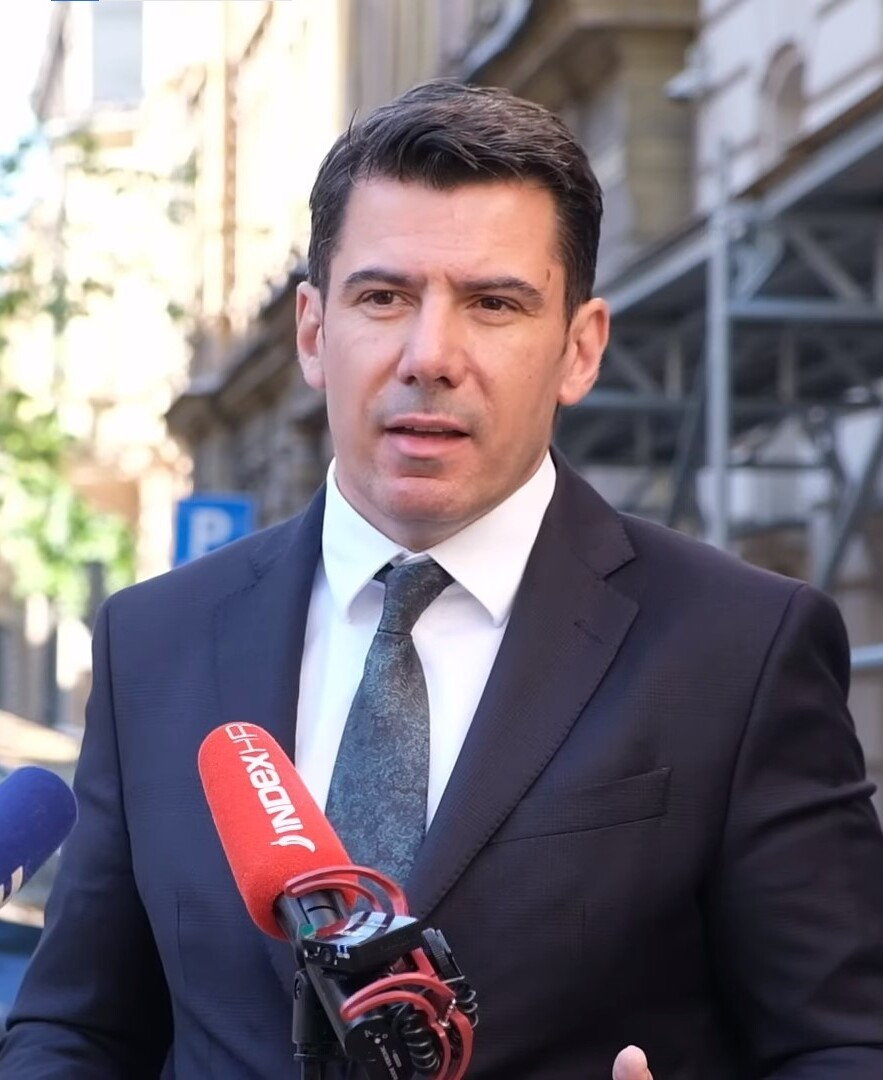
- Grmoja in 2024

Member of the Croatian Parliament
- Incumbent
- Assumed office 14 October 2016
- Constituency: Electoral district VI

President of The Bridge
- Incumbent
- Assumed office 8 November 2025
- Preceded by: Božo Petrov

Personal details
- Born: 28 July 1981 (age 45) Metković, SR Croatia, SFR Yugoslavia
- Party: The Bridge (2015–present)
- Education: University of Zadar

Nikola Grmoja (born 28 July 1981) is a Croatian politician serving as a member of the Croatian Parliament. He is the president of The Bridge political party. He has also served as the spokesperson and political secretary of the party.

After receiving degrees in sociology and history from the Faculty of Philosophy at the University of Zadar, he worked in an elementary school in his birth town of Metković.

He was active in local Metković politics as one of the founders of the local list that would later create the national party The Bridge. He served as deputy mayor of the town, while the mayor was Božo Petrov.

He was elected to the Croatian Parliament in 2016 as a member of The Bridge. A representative of the VI Electoral district, he is serving as Chairman of The National Council for Monitoring the Implementation of the Anti-Corruption Strategy (known as "The Anti-Corruption Council").

He ran as candidate of The Bridge and Croatian Sovereignists for the position of Prime Minister of Croatia in the 2024 parliamentary election.
