= Davorko Vidović =

Croatian lawyer and politician

President of the Social Democrats
- Incumbent
- Assumed office 9 July 2022
- Preceded by: Position established

Leader of the Opposition
- In office 9 July 2022 – 17 May 2024
- Prime Minister: Andrej Plenković
- Preceded by: Peđa Grbin
- Succeeded by: Peđa Grbin

Member of the Croatian Parliament
- In office 22 July 2020 – 16 May 2024
- Constituency: VI electoral district

Deputy Speaker of the Croatian Parliament
- In office 15 December 2021 – 16 May 2024

Member of Health and Social Policy Committee
- Incumbent
- Assumed office 31 July 2020

President of Our Croatia
- Incumbent
- Assumed office 7 October 2023

Personal details
- Born: 26 June 1956 (age 70) Sisak, PR Croatia, Yugoslavia
- Party: Socijaldemokrati (2021–present)
- Other political affiliations: Social Democratic Party of Croatia (until 2021)
- Education: University of Zagreb

Davorko Vidović (born 26 June 1956) is a Croatian politician, the current president of Social Democrats (Croatian: Socijaldemokrati) and a member of Croatian Parliament.

Vidović previously served as a Minister of Labour and Social Welfare from 2000 to 2003 and was elected a mayor of Sisak in 2005. In 2021, Vidović, along with several high-ranking members of Social Democratic Party of Croatia including previous party leader Davor Bernardić were expelled from party on charges of doing damage to party or refusing to respect the decisions of the party. On July 9, 2022, they founded the Social Democrats party.
