= Peđa Grbin =

Croatian lawyer and politician (born 1979)

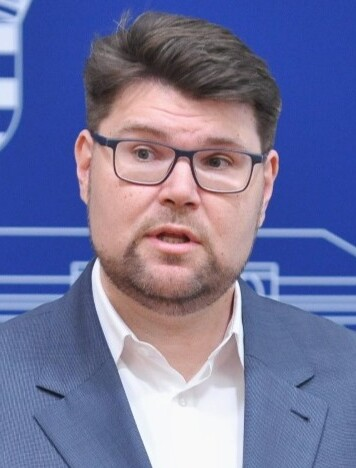
- Grbin in 2024

Mayor of Pula
- Incumbent
- Assumed office 5 June 2025
- Preceded by: Filip Zoričić

President of the Social Democratic Party
- In office 3 October 2020 – 21 September 2024
- Deputy: Biljana Borzan; Sabina Glasovac; Ranko Ostojić; Siniša Hajdaš Dončić
- Preceded by: Davor Bernardić; Zlatko Komadina (acting)
- Succeeded by: Siniša Hajdaš Dončić

Leader of the Opposition
- In office 17 May 2024 – 21 September 2024
- Prime Minister: Andrej Plenković
- Preceded by: Davorko Vidović
- Succeeded by: Siniša Hajdaš Dončić
- In office 3 October 2020 – 9 July 2022
- Prime Minister: Andrej Plenković
- Preceded by: Davor Bernardić; Zlatko Komadina (acting)
- Succeeded by: Davorko Vidović

Member of the Croatian Parliament
- In office 22 December 2011 – 26 September 2025
- Constituency: VIII electoral district

Personal details
- Born: 24 May 1979 (age 47) Pula, SR Croatia, SFR Yugoslavia
- Party: Social Democratic Party (1998–present)
- Spouse: Altana Hodžić (m. 2017)
- Children: 1
- Education: University of Zagreb

Peđa Grbin (born 24 May 1979) is a Croatian lawyer and politician serving as mayor of Pula since June 2025. He was president of the Social Democratic Party (SDP) from 2020 to 2024. He was also Leader of the Opposition from 2020 to 2022 and again from May to September 2024. He previously represented the VIII electoral district in the Croatian Parliament from 2011 to 2025.

Grbin also served as the Chairman of the Parliament's Committee on the Constitution, Standing Orders and Political System from 2012 until 2015. He was vice president of the SDP from 2016 to 2018 when he was suspended from that position after a letter's publication in which he and three other SDP members had called on then SDP president Davor Bernardić to resign.

== Early life, education and professional career ==
Grbin attended elementary and high school in Pula, after which he enrolled in the Zagreb Faculty of Law from which he graduated in 2003. During elementary and high school days he played basketball for the local basketball team Gradine Pula. After graduating, Grbin worked as a trainee in a law office and afterwards as an attorney from 2006 to 2011.

== Political career ==
After serving as a city councilor and a member of the municipal executive council in Pula, Grbin successfully ran in 2011 parliamentary election, and was elected to the Parliament in the VIII electoral district. He was reelected in 2015.

=== Early career ===
Grbin joined the Social Democratic Party (SDP) in 1998, and soon after that entered SDP Youth Forum where he was secretary general from 2001 to 2002. After graduating from law school he returned to Pula where he served first as a member of the municipal executive council from 2005 to 2009 and then as a city councilor from 2009 to 2013. Grbin was elected to the head committee of the SDP in 2004 and has been a member of that party governing body until 2016 when he was elected to the party presidency. In July 2018, he and three other members of the SDP presidency were suspended from their positions because of their criticism of the way party president Davor Bernardić led the SDP. Their suspensions were partially lifted in October 2019.

=== Parliamentary career ===
In 2011 parliamentary election, Grbin was elected in the Croatian Parliament for the first time. After Josip Leko was elected to the position of Speaker of Croatian Parliament, Grbin was elected to the position of Chairman of the Committee on the Constitution, Standing Orders and Political System of the Croatian Parliament, where he served until the end of 2015. During his tenure as a committee chairman, Grbin was responsible for the preparation and adoption of the Act on the Co-Operation of the Croatian Parliament and the Government of the Republic of Croatian in European Affairs, new Standing Orders of the Croatian Parliament and 2015 amendments to Act on Election of Representatives to the Croatian Parliament.

Grbin was reelected to Croatian Parliament in 2015 parliamentary election and again in 2016 parliamentary election, where he served as a Deputy Chairman of the Committee on the Constitution, Standing Orders and Political System of the Croatian Parliament.

On 3 October 2020, Grbin was elected president of the SDP. He was Leader of the Opposition from October 2020 until July 2022, when he was replaced by Davorko Vidović, the leader of the Social Democrats.

=== Mayor of Pula ===
After the 2025 local elections, Peđa Grbin was elected Mayor of Pula with 9,026 votes, beating incumbent Filip Zoričić's 7,911. Upon taking office, he promised free public transport for seniors and a revaluation of the city's projects.

== Personal life ==
At a height of 210 centimetres (6.9 ft), Grbin is the tallest politician in the world. He is married to Altana Hodžić since 2017, and together they have a son.
