= Social Democrats (Croatia) =

Social Democrats Socijaldemokrati
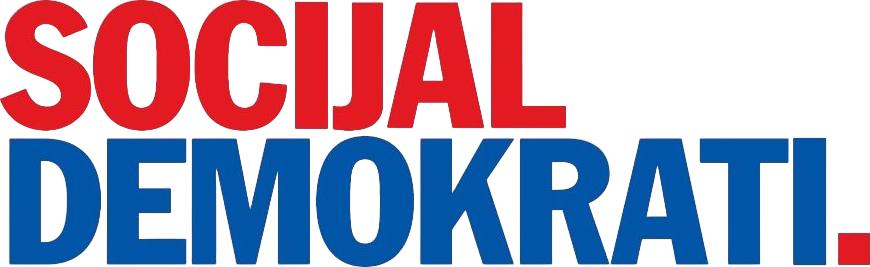
- President: Davorko Vidović
- General Secretary: Nikša Vukas
- Founded: October 2021 (parliamentary group); 9 July 2022 (party)
- Split from: Social Democratic Party of Croatia
- Membership (2022): 1,300
- Ideology: Social democracy Progressivism
- Political position: Centre-left
- National affiliation: Our Croatia
- Colours: Red; Blue
- Sabor: 0 / 151

Website
- socijaldemokrati.hr

The Social Democrats (Croatian: Socijaldemokrati) is a Croatian centre-left political party founded in 2022. The party was preceded by a parliamentary group of the same name that broke away from the Social Democratic Party of Croatia in October 2021.

== History ==
The party was officially launched on July 9, 2022, and at the time of foundation was the largest opposition force in the Sabor (Croatian Parliament). The party stated they will not go against the initiatives of Croatian Democratic Union that benefit the citizens, and that they do not have plans to be obstructive.

In October 2023, Social Democrats formed a political coalition with the Croatian Peasant Party for the 2024 Croatian parliamentary elections called Our Croatia, which has since been joined by Croatian Labourists – Labour Party and Democrats. In March 2024, the Croatian Peasant Party left the coalition Our Croatia to join the centre/centre-left coalition Rivers of Justice. Social Democrats did not manage to have any of its members elected to the 11th assembly of the Croatian Parliament.

== Election results ==
=== Legislative ===
Election	Coalition	Votes	%	Seats	+/–	Government
Election	Coalition	Coalition		SD		Government
2024	Our Croatia	47,655	2.25 (7th)	0 / 151	New	Extra-parliamentary

=== European Parliament ===
Election	List leader	Coalition	Votes	%	Seats	+/–	EP Group
Election	List leader	Coalition	Coalition		SD		EP Group
2024	Valter Flego	Fair Play List 9 (Note: Including also IDS, NPS, SDSS, HSLS, HNS, NS-R, D, PGS and RI.)	41,710	5.54 (#5)	0 / 12	New	–
