= Opinion polling for the 2015 Croatian parliamentary election =

Opinion polling for the 2015 Croatian parliamentary election started immediately after the 2011 general election. Monthly party ratings were conducted by Ipsos Puls, Mediana and Promocija Plus.

The poll results below are listed by category and ordered in reverse chronological order. Major political events are indicated chronologically between individual polls.

== Opinion polling ==
=== Exit polls ===
Date	Polling Organisation/Client	Sample size	Croatia is Growing	Patriotic Coalition	Most	IDS	Human Blockade	Milan Bandić 365	HDSSB	ORaH	Successful Croatia
8 November 2015	Ipsos puls	34,353	56	57	17	3	3	2	2	0	0

=== Graphical summary ===
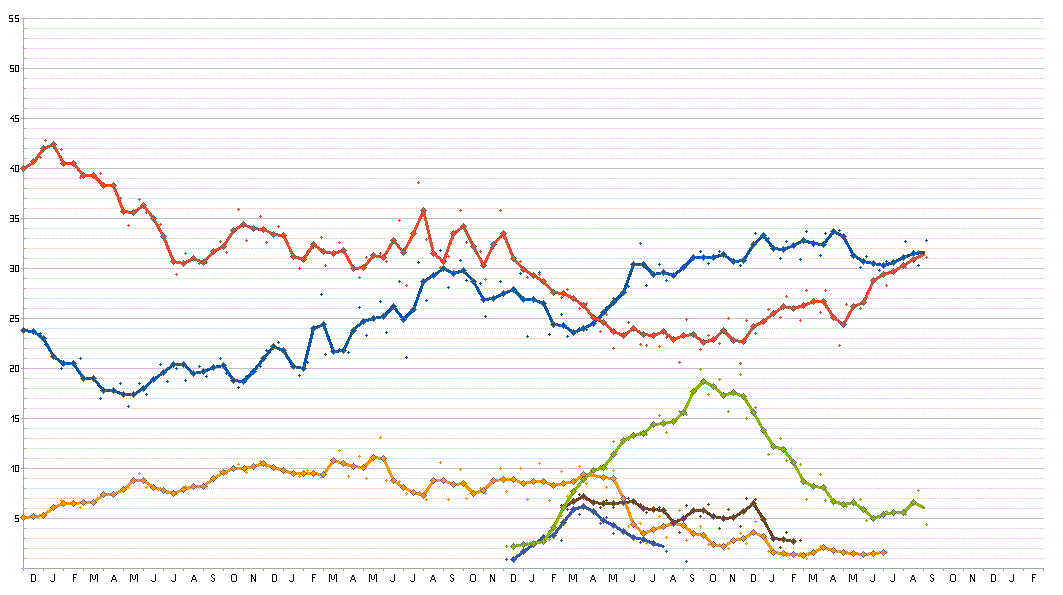
15-day average trend line of poll results from December 2011 to present, with each line corresponding to a political party.

=== If the Elections Were Held Today? ===
Date	Polling Firm	Croatia is Growing	HDZ coalition	LAB	ORaH	NF	SzH	Most	MB 365	ŽZ	Others	Undecided	Lead
27 Oct	telegram.hr	30.1	30.9	(Kuk)	-	-	-	-	-	-	-	-	0.8
21 Oct	Promocija Plus	30.1	32.9	(Kuk)	2.5	-	-	6.2	2.7	3.8	8.9	12.9	2.8
04 Oct	Promocija plus	31.9	32.9	(Kuk)	4.4	-	-	4.7	1.6	3.4	7.3	13.9	1.0
25 Sep	IPSOS PULS	29.1	33.0	(Kuk)	4.1	-	-	3.4	4.5	7.3	10.2	8.4	3.9
04 Sep	Promocija plus	31.1	32.8	(Kuk)	4.4	-	-	3.4	1.8	4.0	7.8	14.6	1.7
25 Aug	IPSOS PULS	28.2	34.0	-	3.0	-	-	2.9	3.8	7.1	10.6	10.4	5.8
22 Aug	Mediana	31.7	30.3	-	7.8	-	-	-	2.9	3.4	-	-	1.4
03 Aug	Promocija plus	30.1	32.7	(Kuk)	5.4	-	-	1.8	2.4	5.7	8.4	13.5	2.6
24 Jul	IPSOS PULS	28.0	32.3	-	3.4	-	-	2.8	3.0	8.5	5.3	11.8	4.3
Jul	Mediana	28.9	28.6	-	6.6	-	-	-	4.0	4.8	-	-	0.3
04 Jul	Promocija plus	28.3	30.7	1.6	5.7	-	-	3.1	2.7	5.3	8.8	13.7	2.4
24 Jun	IPSOS PULS	30.5	29.8	-	5.1	-	-	3.3	3.1	7.4	9.7	11.1	0.7
05 Jun	Promocija plus	27.1	31.2	1.4	4.8	-	-	3.7	2.5	5.5	10.3	13.5	4.1
25 May	IPSOS PULS	26.0	30.1	-	6.9	-	-	3.5	4.2	8.5	8.5	12.3	4.1
13 May	Mediana	26.5	32.3	-	2.9	-	-	1.2	0.3	3.3	16.7	16.7	5.8
5 May	Promocija plus	26.4	32.5	1.5	6.2	-	-	3.1	2.6	5.5	6.7	15.5	6.1
24 Apr	IPSOS PULS	22.3	33.8	-	6.6	-	-	3.7	2.8	15.9	7.8	7.1	11.5
03 Apr	Promocija plus	27.8	33.5	2.0	6.8	-	-	-	1.2	7.7	6.8	14.3	5.7
25 Mar	IPSOS PULS	25.6	31.3	2.2	9.4	-	-	-	3.0	12.1	7.4	9.0	5.7
05 Mar	Promocija plus	27.8	33.7	1.0	6.9	-	-	-	1.5	7.2	6.3	15.6	5.9
25 Feb	IPSOS PULS	24.8	31.9	1.5	10.4	-	1.8	-	2.1	14.9	3.9	8.7	7.1
05 Feb	Promocija plus	27.2	32.7	1.3	10.8	-	3.6	-	1.5	8.6	2.3	12.1	5.5
26 Jan	IPSOS PULS	25.1	31.0	-	13.0	-	2.1	-	2.9	11.7	6.1	8.0	5.9
07 Jan	Promocija plus	25.9	33.0	1.7	11.4	-	3.9	-	1.2	7.8	2.3	12.3	7.1
2015
18 Dec	IPSOS PULS	23.5	33.5	4.7	16.1	-	5.9	-	3.2	-	4.3	8.7	10.0
05 Dec	Promocija plus	24.8	31.2	2.5	15.0	-	7.1	-	1.9	-	-	-	6.4
25 Nov	IPSOS PULS	20.5	30.3	3.5	19.4	-	4.2	-	3.0	-	7.4	11.6	9.8
07 Nov	Promocija plus	25.0	31.0	2.0	15.7	-	5.9	-	2.3	-	-	-	6.0
24 Oct	IPSOS PULS	22.5	31.7	2.4	18.9	-	4.0	-	4.7	-	4.1	11.3	9.2
7 Oct	Promocija plus	23.3	30.5	2.4	17.4	-	6.4	-	2.4	-	-	-	7.2
25 Sep	IPSOS PULS	21.9	31.7	4.2	19.9	-	5.2	-	3.9	-	4.5	8.1	9.8
5 Sep	Promocija plus	24.9	30.5	2.8	15.4	0.7	6.3	-	2.0	-	1.9	14.6	5.6
25 Aug	IPSOS PULS	21.6	29.7	5.8	15.7	-	3.6	-	6.1	-	5.7	11.8	8.1
5 Aug	Promocija plus	24.1	28.8	3.1	13.6	1.7	5.5	-	2.4	-	3.8	17.0	4.7
24 Jul	IPSOS PULS	23.2	30.4	5.2	15.3	-	6.1	-	4.8	-	5.1	9.9	7.2
4 Jul	Promocija plus	23.3	28.3	2.5	13.4	-	5.6	-	-	-	-	-	5.0
25 Jun	IPSOS PULS	23.4	32.5	4.5	13.6	2.6	6.4	-	4.7	-	2.3	10.0	9.1
7 Jun	Promocija plus	24.6	28.2	4.2	12.9	-	7.0	-	-	-	-	-	3.6
16 May	IPSOS PULS	22.0	27.0	9.8	12.7	3.5	6.1	-	2.9	-	4.7	11.3	5.0
4 May	Promocija plus	25.4	26.1	8.1	10.0	5.1	6.8	-	-	-	-	-	0.7
25 Apr	IPSOS PULS	23.7	25.1	10.0	10.2	4.5	6.1	-	4.0	-	3.3	13.1	1.4
5 Apr	Promocija plus	26.5	23.9	8.5	9.3	6.9	7.0	-	1.5	-	2.0	12.6	2.6
25 Mar	IPSOS PULS	26.0	24.0	10.2	8.5	5.4	7.4	-	4.5	-	3.3	11.4	2.0
6 Mar	Promocija plus	27.9	23.2	7.2	6.8	6.3	5.9	-	1.8	-	2.1	18.9	4.7
25 Feb	IPSOS PULS	27.1	25.4	9.7	5.3	2.8	6.3	-	3.5	-	4.9	13.5	1.7
8 Feb	Promocija plus	28.0	23.4	6.8	2.9	3.7	-	-	1.6	-	7.7	24.7	4.6
6 Jan	Promocija plus	29.1	24.2	6.9	2.5	2.4	-	-	2.3	-	7.7	24.1	4.9
2014

=== Seats projections (76 needed for majority) ===
Date	Polling Organisation/Client	Croatia is Growing	HDZ coalition	Labour	ORaH	HDSSB	Most	Milan Bandić 365	IDS	Human Blockade	Successful Croatia	Partnership of Croatian Center	Alliance for Croatia	Others
2 November 2015	Ipsos puls	60	57	(Croatia is Growing)	0	2	12	3	3	3	0	-	-	0
3–21 October 2015	Promocija Plus	60	63	(Croatia is Growing)	1	3	5	3	3	1	1	-	-	0
September 2015	Ipsos puls	53 (35,1%)	51 (33,8%)	(Kukuriku)	12 (8%)	4 (2,7%)	6	4	2	8	0	-	-	0
27 Mar 2014	Politika	43 (29.4%)	40 (27.1%)	16 (11.5%)	14 (9.6%)	(Alliance for Croatia)	-	-	(Kukuriku)	-	-	8 (6.1%)	12 (8.3%)	0
4 Dec 2011	Results of the 2011 Croatian parliamentary election	81	49	6	-	6	-	-	(Kukuriku)	-	-	-	-	9

== 2014 ==
Date	Polling Organisation/Client	Sample size	Kukuriku coalition				HDZ coalition				Alliance for Croatia				Labour	Grubišić et al	HSLS	ORaH	NF	IL MB	Other	Undecided
Date	Polling Organisation/Client	Sample size	SDP	HNS-LD	HSU	IDS	HDZ	HSS	HSP-AS	BUZ	HDSSB	HSP	HRAST	Hrvatska Zora	Labour	Grubišić et al	HSLS	ORaH	NF	IL MB	Other	Undecided
4 Jul	CRO Demoskop	1,300	23.3%				28.3%				5.6%				2.5%	0.8%	1.1%	12.6%	0.8%	2.3%	2.3%	17.9%
4 Jul	CRO Demoskop	1,300	19.1%	3.0%	0.7%	1.2%	23.1%	2.9%	2.2%	0.5%	2.0%	1.5%	1.8%	1.5%	2.5%	0.8%	1.1%	12.6%	0.8%	2.3%	2.3%	17.9%
25 Jun	Ipsos Puls for Nova TV	1,300	23.4%				32.5%				6.4%				4.5%	-	-	13.8%	-	3.3%	7.7%	10.7%
25 Jun	Ipsos Puls for Nova TV	1,300	17.4%	2.3%	-	-	25.5%	3.6%	2.5%	3.7%	2.7%	-	2.7%	-	4.5%	-	-	13.8%	-	3.3%	7.7%	10.7%
7 Jun	CRO Demoskop	1,300	24.6%				28.2%				7.0%				4.2%	-	-	12.3%	-	-	3.0%	14.5%
7 Jun	CRO Demoskop	1,300	19.6%	2.9%	-	-	22.9%	2.9%	-	-	-	-	-	-	4.2%	-	-	12.3%	-	-	3.0%	14.5%
25 May	Major opposition party HDZ in coalition with HSS and HSP-AS received 41.4% of votes on European Parliament election May 2014.The Kukuriku coalition gathered around the main ruling party SDP won 30% of votes.																					
16 May	Ipsos Puls	1,000	22.0%				27.0%				6.1%				7.3%	1.3%	<1.0%	11.9%	2.5%	2.2%	2.9%	11.7%
16 May	Ipsos Puls	1,000	18.9%	1.2%	1.9%	1.5%	23.3%	1.9%	1.6%	2.1%	2.4%	1.6%	1.7%	<1.0%	7.3%	1.3%	<1.0%	11.9%	2.5%	2.2%	2.9%	11.7%
4 May	CRO Demoskop	1,300	25.4%				26.1%				6.8%				7.4%	0.8%	1.4%	9.9%	3.3%	1.6%	3.0%	14.5%
4 May	CRO Demoskop	1,300	19.7%	3.4%	0.8%	1.2%	20.2%	3.3%	1.8%	-	2.4%	1.4%	2.0%	2.0%	7.4%	0.8%	1.4%	9.9%	3.3%	1.6%	3.0%	14.5%
25 Apr	Ipsos Puls for NovaTV	1,000	23.7%				25.1%				6.1%				8.8%	1.3%	1.2%	10.8%	2.0%	2.8%	4.8%	13.8%
25 Apr	Ipsos Puls for NovaTV	1,000	19.7%	1.5%	1.5%	0.8%	19.8%	2.6%	2.0%	1.6%	3.0%	2.1%	2.0%	1.4%	8.8%	1.3%	1.2%	10.8%	2.0%	2.8%	4.8%	13.8%
5 Apr	CRO Demoskop	1,300	26.5%				23.9%				7.0%				7.4%	0.7%	1.5%	7.8%	4.0%	1.5%	1.3%	12.6%
5 Apr	CRO Demoskop	1,300	20.7%	4.0%	1.2%	1.3%	20.2%	2.6%	1.9%	<1.0%	2.3%	1.6%	1.3%	<1.0%	7.4%	0.7%	1.5%	7.8%	4.0%	1.5%	1.3%	12.6%
25 Mar	Ipsos Puls for NovaTV	1,000	26.0%				24.0%				7.4%				8.7%	0.8%	2.0%	7.5%	3.3%	3.6%	1.4%	12.7%
25 Mar	Ipsos Puls for NovaTV	1,000	20.3%	2.3%	1.3%	1.4%	20.4%	1.1%	2.2%	3.6%	3.3%	1.7%	1.3%	0.9%	8.7%	0.8%	2.0%	7.5%	3.3%	3.6%	1.4%	12.7%
11 Mar	Major opposition party Croatian Democratic Union (HDZ) and former Prime Minister and leader of HDZ Ivo Sanader were found guilty of corruption.																					
5 Mar	CRO Demoskop	1,300	27.9%				23.2%				5.9%				7.2%	<1.0%%	1.2%	6.8%	4.4%	1.7%	1.7%	18.5%
5 Mar	CRO Demoskop	1,300	22.5%	4.9%	1.7%	1.2%	20.2%	2.3%	<1.0%		2.1%	1.6%	1.2%	0.7%	7.2%	<1.0%%	1.2%	6.8%	4.4%	1.7%	1.7%	18.5%
1 Mar	NF and the HSLS signed an agreement on joint participation in the elections for the European Parliament and formed partnership of Croatian center. Alliance of Primorje-Gorski Kotar (PGS) announced to join this coalition.																					
25 Feb	Ipsos Puls for NovaTV	1,000	27.1%				25.4%				6.3%				9.7%	1.9%	1.0%	5.3%	3.2%	3.5%	6.4%	13.5%
25 Feb	Ipsos Puls for NovaTV	1,000	22.2%	4.0%	2.1%	2.2%	20.7%	2.2%	3.0%	1.8%	3.7%	1.6%	0.8%		9.7%	1.9%	1.0%	5.3%	3.2%	3.5%	6.4%	13.5%
20 Feb	Member of Croatian Parliament Natalija Martinčević and former CEO of HEP were expelled from HNS-LD.																					
8 Feb	CRO Demoskop	1,300	28.0%				23.4%				5.7%				6.8%	1.0%	1.2%	2.9%	3.7%	1.6%	1.5%	20.8%
8 Feb	CRO Demoskop	1,300	23.4%	4.0%	1.2%	1.1%	20.5%	2.7%	2.2%	<1%	2.1%	1.7%	1.4%	0.5%	6.8%	1.0%	1.2%	2.9%	3.7%	1.6%	1.5%	20.8%
5 Feb	Leaders of eight right-wing parties formed the Alliance for Croatia, the Alliance consists of HDSSB, HSP, HRAST, Hrvatska Zora, A-HSS and other minor right wing parties.																					
25 Jan	Ipsos Puls for NovaTV	1,000	29.4%				29.6%				4.4%				10.5%	3.7%	1.8%				3.7%	15.8%
25 Jan	Ipsos Puls for NovaTV	1,000	22.7%	3.4%	1.8%	1.5%	21.0%	3.4%	3.7%	1.5%	2.2%	2.2%			10.5%	3.7%	1.8%				3.7%	15.8%
15 Jan	Former President of the HNS-LD, and First Deputy Prime Minister Radimir Čačić was expelled from the party.																					
6 Jan	CRO Demoskop	1,300	29.1%				24.2%				5.7%				6.9%	1.1%	1.4%	2.5%	2.4%	2.3%	1.3%	19.5%
6 Jan	CRO Demoskop	1,300	23.9%	4.9%	1.3%	1.3%	20.8%	2.9%	2.0%	<1.0%	2.3%	2.1%	1.3%	<1.0%	6.9%	1.1%	1.4%	2.5%	2.4%	2.3%	1.3%	19.5%

== 2013 ==
Date	Polling Organisation/Client	Sample size	Kukuriku coalition				HDZ coalition				Labour	HDSSB	Grubišić et al	HSP	HSLS	ORaH	NF	IL MB	HRAST	Other	Undecided
Date	Polling Organisation/Client	Sample size	SDP	HNS-LD	HSU	IDS	HDZ	HSS	HSP-AS	BUZ	Labour	HDSSB	Grubišić et al	HSP	HSLS	ORaH	NF	IL MB	HRAST	Other	Undecided
26 Dec	Ipsos Puls for NovaTV	1,000	30.7%				29.5%				10.0%	4.0%	3.3%	2.2%	2.2%					2.6%	16.0%
26 Dec	Ipsos Puls for NovaTV	1,000	24.0%	4.0%	1.2%	1.5%	21.0%	2.7%	3.3%	2.5%	10.0%	4.0%	3.3%	2.2%	2.2%					2.6%	16.0%
5 Dec	CRO Demoskop	1,300	31.2%				26.3%				7.7%	1.9%	1.4%	1.8%	1.4%	2.2%	0.9%	1.4%	0.9%	2.6%	20.4%
5 Dec	CRO Demoskop	1,300	24.3%	5.1%	0.5%	1.3%	21.1%	3.2%	2.0%	<1%	7.7%	1.9%	1.4%	1.8%	1.4%	2.2%	0.9%	1.4%	0.9%	2.6%	20.4%
25 Nov	Ipsos Puls for NovaTV	1,000	35.8%				28.7%				10.0%	3.2%	1.8%	<1%	2.7%					3.1%	12.6%
25 Nov	Ipsos Puls for NovaTV	1,000	26.4%	4.7%	2.2%	2.5%	20.2%	3.9%	3.2%	1.4%	10.0%	3.2%	1.8%	<1%	2.7%					3.1%	12.6%
3 Nov	CRO Demoskop	1,300	28.9%				25.2%				7.5%	1.8%	1.5%	1.9%	1.7%					5.1%	22.2%
3 Nov	CRO Demoskop	1,300	24.1%	4.8%	1.4%	1.4%	21.6%	2.7%	2.3%	<1%	7.5%	1.8%	1.5%	1.9%	1.7%					5.1%	22.2%
29 Oct	Mirela Holy, member of parliament and former minister of environment and nature protection and former member of SDP founded party ORaH																				
26 Oct	Ipsos Puls for Nova TV	961	31.7%				28.5%				8.0%	3.2%	4.2%	2.7%	2.7%					2.9%	15.3%
26 Oct	Ipsos Puls for Nova TV	961	24.0%	4.4%	2.2%	1.1%	21%	2.2%	3.1%	2.2%	8.0%	3.2%	4.2%	2.7%	2.7%					2.9%	15.3%
5 Oct	CRO Demoskop	1,300	32.6%				28.8%				7.0%	2.4%	1.3%	1.8%	1.3%					3.2%	22.6%
5 Oct	CRO Demoskop	1,300	25.0%	5.0%	1.3%	1.3%	21.9%	3.1%	2.1%	0.9%	7.0%	2.4%	1.3%	1.8%	1.3%					3.2%	22.6%
25 Sep	Ipsos Puls for Nova TV	961	35.8%				30.8%				9.9%	2.1%	2.7%	2.9%	1.8%					1.2%	12.4%
25 Sep	Ipsos Puls for Nova TV	961	25.8%	5.6%	2.4%	1.3%	20.5%	3.0%	5.5%	1.8%	9.9%	2.1%	2.7%	2.9%	1.8%					1.2%	12.4%
7 Sep	CRO Demoskop	1,300	31.2%				28.1%				6.9%	2.4%	1.3%	1.8%	1.3%					3.2%	22.6%
7 Sep	CRO Demoskop	1,300	25.3%	4.9%	1.3%	1.3%	22.0%	3.1%	2.1%	0.9%	6.9%	2.4%	1.3%	1.8%	1.3%					3.2%	22.6%
26 Aug	Ipsos Puls for Nova TV	961	30.1%				31.8%				10.6%	3.7%	1.7%	1.9%	1.3%					1.5%	13.4%
26 Aug	Ipsos Puls for Nova TV	961	25.4%	3.4%	<0.2%	1.3%	20.3%	4.4%	4.0%	3.1%	10.6%	3.7%	1.7%	1.9%	1.3%					1.5%	13.4%
4 Aug	CRO Demoskop	1,300	32.9%				26.8%				6.9%	2.1%	1.3%	1.8%	1.4%						
4 Aug	CRO Demoskop	1,300	25.4%	5.1%	1.1%	1.3%	21.8%	2.9%	2.1%	<2%	6.9%	2.1%	1.3%	1.8%	1.4%						
24 Jul	Ipsos Puls for Nova TV	971	38.6%				30.6%				7.6%	3.3%	3.3%	2.4%	2.2%					1.9%	9.4%
24 Jul	Ipsos Puls for Nova TV	971	30.4%	4.9%	2%	1.3%	22.1%	3.3%	3.3%	1.9%	7.6%	3.3%	3.3%	2.4%	2.2%					1.9%	9.4%
19 Jul	HDZ and HSS sign coalition agreement and announce their intention to form a coalition for the next general election.																				
Date	Polling Organisation/Client	Sample size	Kukuriku coalition				HDZ coalition			Labour	HDSSB	Grubišić et al	HSS	HSP	HSLS	Other	Undecided				
Date	Polling Organisation/Client	Sample size	SDP	HNS-LD	HSU	IDS	HDZ	HSP-AS	BUZ	Labour	HDSSB	Grubišić et al	HSS	HSP	HSLS	Other	Undecided				
5 Jul	CRO Demoskop	1,300	28.3%				21.1%			7.5%	<2%	<2%	2.1%	<2%	<2%		25.3%				
5 Jul	CRO Demoskop	1,300	23.9%	4.4%	<2%	<2%	21.1%	<2%	<2%	7.5%	<2%	<2%	2.1%	<2%	<2%		25.3%				
1 Jul	Croatia becomes the 28th member of the European Union.																				
24 Jun	Ipsos Puls for Nova TV	968	34.8%				28.7%			8.7%	2.9%	3.1%	2.4%	1.3%	1.1%	5.2%	11.8%				
24 Jun	Ipsos Puls for Nova TV	968	26.8%	4.1%	1.7%	2.2%	22.5%	4.2%	2%	8.7%	2.9%	3.1%	2.4%	1.3%	1.1%	5.2%	11.8%				
21 Jun	Former SDP minister Mirela Holy leaves the party because of severe disagreement with the PM over the climate and energy policy of the cabinet.																				
14 Jun	A socially conservative civil group, opposing the governing coalitions' affirmative same-sex marriage stance, brings over 700,000 signatures to Parliament with the intention of constitutionally defining marriage as a union between a man and a woman. The number of signatures is enough to trigger a binding referendum.																				
5 Jun	CRO Demoskop	1,300	30.7%				23.6%			8.8%	1.9%	1.5%	2.8%	1.6%	1.4%	2.5%	25.3%				
5 Jun	CRO Demoskop	1,300	23.9%	4.2%	1.3%	1.3%	20.8%	1.8%	1.0%	8.8%	1.9%	1.5%	2.8%	1.6%	1.4%	2.5%	25.3%				
2 Jun	Second round of the nationwide quadrennial local elections is held. SDP wins most major cities, including Split, Rijeka and Osijek, but loses Zagreb to its former member. HDZ wins the majority of counties, but loses all major cities apart from Zadar.																				
27 May	Ipsos Puls for Nova TV	969	31.5%				26.7%			13.1%	2.6%	2.7%	3.9%	1.6%	0.8%	2.4%	13.9%				
27 May	Ipsos Puls for Nova TV	969	23.8%	4.4%	2.5%	0.8%	21.5%	3.1%	2.1%	13.1%	2.6%	2.7%	3.9%	1.6%	0.8%	2.4%	13.9%				
5 May	CRO Demoskop	1,300	31.1%				23.3%			9.0%	2.3%	2.0%	2.6%	2.0%	1.6%	3.0%	23.2%				
5 May	CRO Demoskop	1,300	24.8%	3.3%	1.6%	1.4%	19.5%	2.5%	1.3%	9.0%	2.3%	2.0%	2.6%	2.0%	1.6%	3.0%	23.2%				
24 Apr	Ipsos Puls for Nova TV	1,000	29.1%				26.1%			11.2%	3.4%	3.7%	3.7%	3.2%	1.8%	1.8%	15.9%				
24 Apr	Ipsos Puls for Nova TV	1,000	23.1%	2.9%	1.9%	1.2%	19.6%	3.1%	3.4%	11.2%	3.4%	3.7%	3.7%	3.2%	1.8%	1.8%	15.9%				
14 Apr	The 2013 special European Parliament election is held. HDZ coalition wins an unexpected razor thin plurality over the SDP coalition.																				
7 Apr	CRO Demoskop	1,300	30.9%				21.6%			9.2%	2.7%	2.0%	2.8%	1.8%	1.8%	1.7%	24.9%				
7 Apr	CRO Demoskop	1,300	25.0%	2.8%	1.7%	1.4%	18.8%	1.7%	1.1%	9.2%	2.7%	2.0%	2.8%	1.8%	1.8%	1.7%	24.9%				
25 Mar	Ipsos Puls for Nova TV	971	32.6%				21.9%			11.8%	4.4%	4.0%	4.0%	2.5%	1.9%	3.3%	13.6%				
25 Mar	Ipsos Puls for Nova TV	971	26.0%	2.4%	2.1%	2.1%	17.0%	2.5%	2.4%	11.8%	4.4%	4.0%	4.0%	2.5%	1.9%	3.3%	13.6%				
10 Mar	Croatian and Slovenian Prime Ministers sign a memorandum settling the final hurdle in the Croatian EU ratification process.																				
9 Mar	Minister of Tourism is forced to resign, after it is revealed he is a subject of investigation over his family's past real estate affairs.																				
3 Mar	CRO Demoskop	1,300	30.3%				21.4%			9.7%	3.1%	2.0%	2.6%	1.8%	1.8%	1.7%	25.6%				
3 Mar	CRO Demoskop	1,300	25.2%	2.6%	1.4%	1.1%	18.8%	1.6%	1.0%	9.7%	3.1%	2.0%	2.6%	1.8%	1.8%	1.7%	25.6%				
1 Mar	Former Prime Minister and HDZ leader Jadranka Kosor is expelled from the party by its High Court of Honor and she becomes an independent member of parliament which reduces the main opposition party's parliamentary club to 41 members.																				
28 Feb	Former Defence Minister and Economy Minister Branko Vukelić leaves HDZ to become an independent member of parliament.																				
25 Feb	Ipsos Puls for Nova TV	950	33.1%				27.4%			9.1%	4.3%	3.5%	3.2%	2.8%	1.5%	2.2%	13.4%				
25 Feb	Ipsos Puls for Nova TV	950	27.0%	1.7%	2.7%	1.7%	20.0%	3.3%	4.1%	9.1%	4.3%	3.5%	3.2%	2.8%	1.5%	2.2%	13.4%				
6 Feb	CRO Demoskop	1,300	31.7%				20.6%			9.8%	3.3%	2.5%	2.9%	2.4%	2.1%	2.8%	22.9%				
6 Feb	CRO Demoskop	1,300	25.7%	3.2%	1.7%	1.1%	19.1%	1.5%		9.8%	3.3%	2.5%	2.9%	2.4%	2.1%	2.8%	22.9%				
25 Jan	Ipsos Puls for Nova TV	951	30%				19.3%			9.2%	3.8%	4.1%	2.5%	2.7%	<2%	10.9%	17%				
25 Jan	Ipsos Puls for Nova TV	951	27.1%	2.9%	<2%	<2%	19.3%	<2%	<2%	9.2%	3.8%	4.1%	2.5%	2.7%	<2%	10.9%	17%				
6 Jan	CRO Demoskop	1,300	32.4%				21%			9.7%	2.6%	2.2%	3%	2.4%	1.7%	3.7%	21.4%				
6 Jan	CRO Demoskop	1,300	26%	3.2%	1.9%	1.3%	19.2%	1.8%	<2%	9.7%	2.6%	2.2%	3%	2.4%	1.7%	3.7%	21.4%				

== 2012 ==
Date	Polling Organisation/Client	Sample size	Kukuriku coalition				HDZ coalition			Labour	HDSSB	Grubišić et al	HSS	HSP	HSLS	Other	Undecided
Date	Polling Organisation/Client	Sample size	SDP	HNS-LD	HSU	IDS	HDZ	HSP-AS	BUZ	Labour	HDSSB	Grubišić et al	HSS	HSP	HSLS	Other	Undecided
23 Dec	Ipsos Puls for Nova TV	968	34.2%				22.6%			9.9%	2.4%	3.4%	4.1%	2.6%	2.3%	4%	15.9%
23 Dec	Ipsos Puls for Nova TV	968	26.6%	2.7%	3.5%	1.4%	19%	1.3%	2.3%	9.9%	2.4%	3.4%	4.1%	2.6%	2.3%	4%	15.9%
14 Dec	Standard & Poor's downgrades the Croatian credit rating to junk status.																
13 Dec	Interior Minister Ranko Ostojić orders an investigation over a spying scandal which involved Tomislav Karamarko ordering the tracking of the Attorney General Mladen Bajić and several prominent journalists during his tenure as Minister of the Interior.																
4 Dec	CRO Demoskop	1,300	32.6%				21.8%			10.2%	2.8%	2.2%	3%	1.8%	1.5%	2.4%	21.8%
4 Dec	CRO Demoskop	1,300	26.5%	3.3%	1.6%	1.2%	19.3%	2.1%	0.4%	10.2%	2.8%	2.2%	3%	1.8%	1.5%	2.4%	21.8%
26 Nov	Croatian Democratic Union (HDZ), Croatian Party of Rights dr. Ante Starčević (HSP-AS) and Bloc Pensioners Together (BUZ) sign a coalition agreement.																
Date	Polling Organisation/Client	Sample size	Kukuriku coalition				HDZ coalition	Labour	HDSSB	Grubišić et al	HSS	HSP-AS	HSP	HSLS	BUZ	Other	Undecided
Date	Polling Organisation/Client	Sample size	SDP	HNS-LD	HSU	IDS	HDZ	Labour	HDSSB	Grubišić et al	HSS	HSP-AS	HSP	HSLS	BUZ	Other	Undecided
26 Nov	Ipsos Puls for Nova TV	964	35.2%				20.2%	10.7%	3.1%	3.5%	3.4%		3.3%			8.6%	12.9%
26 Nov	Ipsos Puls for Nova TV	964	29.1%	2.2%	3%		20.2%	10.7%	3.1%	3.5%	3.4%		3.3%			8.6%	12.9%
20 Nov	Former Prime Minister and leader of HDZ Ivo Sanader is sentenced to ten years in prison for taking bribes from two foreign companies in the first of three corruption trials against him.																
19 Nov	Finance minister Slavko Linić presents the 2013 budget, announcing further, albeit less than expected cuts.																
16 Nov	Ante Gotovina and Mladen Markač, two prominent generals who fought in the Croatian War of Independence and were accused of war crimes, are found innocent by ICTY and are immediately released from prison.																
14 Nov	Vice Premier and leader of the second largest governing party Radimir Čačić resigns on both functions after he is sentenced to 22 months in prison because of a car crash he caused, which resulted in the death of two people in Hungary.																
4 Nov	CRO Demoskop	1,300	32.8%				19.2%	9.6%	2.7%	2.5%	3.1%	2.4%	2%	1.3%	(<1.5%)	3.2%	21.4%
4 Nov	CRO Demoskop	1,300	27.3%	3.2%	1.1%	1.2%	19.2%	9.6%	2.7%	2.5%	3.1%	2.4%	2%	1.3%	(<1.5%)	3.2%	21.4%
25 Oct	Leader of the Opposition Tomislav Karamarko comes under growing pressure from the Prime Minister, members of Parliament and the media for seeming to know the details of the investigation against members of organized crime conducted in secrecy. Meanwhile, Jutarnji list runs a developing story accusing Karamarko and Večernji list for allegedly trying to create a fake political scandal and discredit the Prime Minister and the Minister of the Interior.																
23 Oct	Ipsos Puls for Nova TV	967	35.9%				18.1%	10.4%	5.1%	3.3%	3%	0.8%	2.6%	1.7%	2.3%	2.5%	14.3%
23 Oct	Ipsos Puls for Nova TV	967	29.1%	2.7%	2.9%	1.2%	18.1%	10.4%	5.1%	3.3%	3%	0.8%	2.6%	1.7%	2.3%	2.5%	14.3%
20 Oct	Right-leaning Večernji list publishes a story accusing the police and Interior Minister Ranko Ostojić for illegally tracking phone listings of operatives of the Security and Intelligence Agency (SOA). Left-leaning Jutarnji list reacts with claims that intelligence operatives were tracked because they were suspected of contacts with the mafia. Two days later President Josipović and Prime Minister Milanović hold a joint press conference where they announce major changes in SOA leadership.																
5 Oct	CRO Demoskop	1,300	31.6%				19.5%	9.5%	2.7%	2.3%	2.6%	2%	2.1%	1.3%	(<2%)	6.3%	23.3%
5 Oct	CRO Demoskop	1,300	26.7%	3%	0.9%	1%	19.5%	9.5%	2.7%	2.3%	2.6%	2%	2.1%	1.3%	(<2%)	6.3%	23.3%
25 Sep	Ipsos Puls for Nova TV	1,000	32.7%				21%	9.7%	3.5%	2.7%	4.2%	(<2%)	3.4%	(<2%)	2.4%	6.0%	14.4%
25 Sep	Ipsos Puls for Nova TV	1,000	28%	1.8%	2.9%		21%	9.7%	3.5%	2.7%	4.2%	(<2%)	3.4%	(<2%)	2.4%	6.0%	14.4%
5 Sep	CRO Demoskop	1,300	30.6%				19.2%	8.2%	3.0%	2.4%	2.7%	2.1%	2.0%	1.6%	(<2%)	7.0%	22.7%
5 Sep	CRO Demoskop	1,300	26.6%	4%	(<2%)	(<2%)	19.2%	8.2%	3.0%	2.4%	2.7%	2.1%	2.0%	1.6%	(<2%)	7.0%	22.7%
25 Aug	Ipsos Puls for Nova TV	1,000	30.5%				20.2%	8.1%	3.3%	4.2%	3%	3.2%	2.8%	(<2%)	3.1%	8.6%	15.2%
25 Aug	Ipsos Puls for Nova TV	1,000	25.8%	2.4%	2.3%		20.2%	8.1%	3.3%	4.2%	3%	3.2%	2.8%	(<2%)	3.1%	8.6%	15.2%
3 Aug	CRO Demoskop	1,300	31.5%				18.8%	8.2%	3.0%	2.4%	2.6%	2.5%	2.8%	1.8%	(<2%)	7.8%	20.4%
3 Aug	CRO Demoskop	1,300	27.6%	3.9%	(<2%)	(<2%)	18.8%	8.2%	3.0%	2.4%	2.6%	2.5%	2.8%	1.8%	(<2%)	7.8%	20.4%
20 Jul	Ipsos Puls for Nova TV	1,000	29.4%				22%	7.5%	3.2%	3.8%	2.7%	2.5%	3%	(<2%)	2.8%	8.6%	13.4%
20 Jul	Ipsos Puls for Nova TV	1,000	27%	2.4%	(<2%)	(<2%)	22%	7.5%	3.2%	3.8%	2.7%	2.5%	3%	(<2%)	2.8%	8.6%	13.4%
6 Jul	CRO Demoskop	1,300	32%				18.7%	7.5%	3%	2.1%	2.6%	2.8%	2.7%	1.9%	(<2%)	7.9%	20.7%
6 Jul	CRO Demoskop	1,300	28.5%	3.5%	(<2%)	(<2%)	18.7%	7.5%	3%	2.1%	2.6%	2.8%	2.7%	1.9%	(<2%)	7.9%	20.7%
25 Jun	Ipsos Puls for Nova TV	1,000	34.4%				20.4%	8%	4.4%	3%	2%	3.1%	2.5%	2.5%	2.3%	2.5%	12%
25 Jun	Ipsos Puls for Nova TV	1,000	29.2%	3.2%	(<2%)	2%	20.4%	8%	4.4%	3%	2%	3.1%	2.5%	2.5%	2.3%	2.5%	12%
4 Jun	CRO Demoskop	1,300	35.6%				17.4%	8.1%	3.1%	2.2%	2.4%	2.6%	2.4%	2%	(<2%)	5.7%	20.7%
4 Jun	CRO Demoskop	1,300	30.1%	3.3%	(<2%)	(<2%)	17.1%	8.1%	3.1%	2.2%	2.4%	2.6%	2.4%	2%	(<2%)	5.7%	20.7%
25 May	Ipsos Puls for Nova TV	967	36.9%				18.5%	9.5%	3.5%	3.6%	2.2%	1.7%	3.2%	1.6%	3.7%	1.4%	12.9%
25 May	Ipsos Puls for Nova TV	967	32.6%	2.4%	1.9%		18.5%	9.5%	3.5%	3.6%	2.2%	1.7%	3.2%	1.6%	3.7%	1.4%	12.9%
21 May	Tomislav Karamarko wins the HDZ leadership election thus becoming the unofficial Leader of the Opposition.																
12 May	Prime Minister Zoran Milanović wins his 3rd term as leader of the Social Democrats																
7 May	CRO Demoskop	1,300	34.3%				16.2%	8.1%	3.1%	2.3%	2.6%	2.7%	2.4%	2.2%			
7 May	CRO Demoskop	1,300	30.3%	4%			16.2%	8.1%	3.1%	2.3%	2.6%	2.7%	2.4%	2.2%			
26 Apr	Ipsos Puls for Nova TV	1,000	37%				18.5%	7.7%	3%	3%	3.3%	2.6%	4.1%	2.7%	1.9%	1.2%	14%
26 Apr	Ipsos Puls for Nova TV	1,000	30%	2.9%	2.7%		18.5%	7.7%	3%	3%	3.3%	2.6%	4.1%	2.7%	1.9%	1.2%	14%
26 Mar	Ipsos Puls for Nova TV	1,000	39.5%				17%	7.1%	3.3%	3.9%	3.5%	3.4%				11.4%	11.5%
26 Mar	Ipsos Puls for Nova TV	1,000	32.7%	3.9%	2.9%		17%	7.1%	3.3%	3.9%	3.5%	3.4%				11.4%	11.5%
16 Apr	Croatian Democratic Union trial begins; party pleads not guilty.																
25 Feb	Ipsos Puls for Nova TV	1,000	39.1%				21%	6.1%	2.4%	3.5%	2.4%	3.6%	3.6%			10%	10%
25 Feb	Ipsos Puls for Nova TV	1,000	35%	4.1%			21%	6.1%	2.4%	3.5%	2.4%	3.6%	3.6%			10%	10%
13 Feb	Finance minister Slavko Linić presents the 2012 budget for the remainder of the year proposing cuts of up to 4 billion HRK.																
28 January	Branko Hrg is elected leader of the Croatian Peasant Party																
28 Jan	Ipsos Puls for Nova TV	1,000	41.9%				20%	6.8%	3.3%	3.1%	3.2%	2.6%	2.5%	1.7%	1.3%	2.3%	10.6%
28 Jan	Ipsos Puls for Nova TV	1,000	34%	4.5%	1.6%		20%	6.8%	3.3%	3.1%	3.2%	2.6%	2.5%	1.7%	1.3%	2.3%	10.6%
2-3 Jan	CRO Demoskop	1,300	42.8%				22.4%	5.4%	3.2%	3.1%	3.1%	3.4%	3.2%	2.4%	2.7%	2.9%	5.4%
2-3 Jan	CRO Demoskop	1,300	33.1%	5.2%	2.7%		19.7%	5.4%	3.2%	3.1%	3.1%	3.4%	3.2%	2.4%	2.7%	2.9%	5.4%

== 2011 ==
Date	Polling Organisation/Client	Sample size	Kukuriku coalition				HDZ coalition	Labour	HDSSB	Grubišić et al	HSS	HSP-AS	HSP	HSLS	BUZ	Other	Undecided
Date	Polling Organisation/Client	Sample size	SDP	HNS-LD	HSU	IDS	HDZ	Labour	HDSSB	Grubišić et al	HSS	HSP-AS	HSP	HSLS	BUZ	Other	Undecided
27 Dec	Ipsos Puls for Nova TV	1,000	41.1%				23.5%	5.3%	3%	2.8%	3.1%	2.8%	3.5%	3.6%	2.3%	2.8%	6.3%
23 Dec	Milanović cabinet wins the confidence vote in Parliament. Transition of power occurs.																
22 Dec	The seventh assembly of Parliament is constituted.																
9 Dec	Croatian Democratic Union formally indicted for graft.																
4 Dec	2011 parliamentary election	2,373,538	40%				23.8%	5.1%	2.9%	2.8%	3%	2.8%	3%	3%	2.8%	10.8%	
