= List of members of the Sabor, 2015–2016 =

The eighth Sabor was inaugurated on 28 December 2015 (for the first time in history due to a postponed election of the Speaker), having originally been called by the President to hold an inaugural session on 3 December. The assembly came into existence following the November 2015 parliamentary election and consisted of 151 representatives elected from 10 geographical and two special electoral districts. The 8th Sabor dissolved itself by a vote of 137 in favor on 20 June 2016 and formally dissolved on 15 July 2016. The eighth Sabor was the shortest in the history of independent Croatia with a term lasting only 200 days. The 8th Sabor officially ended on 14 October with the inauguration of the 9th Sabor.

== Parliamentary officials ==
The Speaker of the Croatian Parliament (or President) from 28 December 2015 was Željko Reiner, member of the Croatian Democratic Union (HDZ).

Vice presidents of Sabor were Ante Sanader (HDZ), Robert Podolnjak (Most) and Ivan Tepeš (HSP AS). Two vice presidents were elected on 3 February 2016: Milanka Opačić (SDP) and Vesna Pusić (HNS).

== Composition ==
On the basis of the parliamentary election of 2015, the composition of the Sabor as of the dissolution is as follows. There has to be noted that national minority MPs can join other clubs as well beside the national minority group.

=== By parliamentary club ===
Party	June 2016
Croatian Democratic Union (HDZ)	50
Social Democratic Party of Croatia (SDP)	42
Bridge of Independent Lists (Most)	15
Croatian People's Party – Liberal Democrats (HNS)	10
National minority club	6
Milan Bandić 365 (BM 365), Bloc Pensioners Together (BUZ) and minority MPs	6
Istrian Democratic Assembly (IDS) and Furio Radin	4
Croatian Dialogue Initiative (HRID) and Šandor Juhas	3
Croatian Labourists - Labour Party (Laburisti)	3
Croatian Party of Pensioners (HSU) and Stipe Petrina	3
Croatian Party of Rights dr. Ante Starčević (HSP AS)	3
Croatian Peasant Party (HSS) and Croatian Christian Democratic Party (HDS)	3
Croatian Social Liberal Party (HSLS) and Gordana Rusak	3
Independent Democratic Serb Party (SDSS) and Reformists (Reformisti)	3
Non-Inscrits	3
Total	151

=== By political party ===
Party	January 2016
Croatian Democratic Union (HDZ)	49
Social Democratic Party of Croatia (SDP)	42
Bridge of Independent Lists (Most)	15
Croatian People's Party – Liberal Democrats (HNS)	9
Croatian Labourists - Labour Party (Laburisti)	3
Croatian Party of Rights dr. Ante Starčević (HSP-AS)	3
Istrian Democratic Assembly (IDS)	3
Croatian Democratic Alliance of Slavonia and Baranja (HDSSB)	2
Croatian Dialogue Initiative (HRID)	2
Croatian Party of Pensioners (HSU)	2
Croatian Social Liberal Party (HSLS)	2
Croatian Peasant Party (HSS)	2
Independent Democratic Serb Party (SDSS)	2
Milan Bandić 365 - The Party of Labour and Solidarity (BM 365)	2
Bloc Pensioners Together (BUZ)	1
Croatian Christian Democratic Party (HDS)	1
Croatian Growth (HRAST)	1
Human Shield (Živi zid)	1
Independent List Stipe Petrina (NLSP)	1
Reformists (Reformisti)	1
Independents	7
Total	151

=== MPs by party ===
Party	Name	Constituency/Deputizing
Croatian Democratic Union (50)	Ivan Anušić	District IV
Croatian Democratic Union (50)	Branko Bačić	District X
Croatian Democratic Union (50)	Dražen Barišić	District VI
Croatian Democratic Union (50)	Josip Bilaver	District IX
Croatian Democratic Union (50)	Blaženko Boban	District X, deputizing Zlatko Ževrnja
Croatian Democratic Union (50)	Josip Borić	District VIII, deputizing Anton Kliman
Croatian Democratic Union (50)	Dražen Bošnjaković	District VI
Croatian Democratic Union (50)	Marija Budimir	District V
Croatian Democratic Union (50)	Stevo Culej	District V
Croatian Democratic Union (50)	Tomislav Čuljak	District V
Croatian Democratic Union (50)	Tomislav Ćorić	District I, deputizing Davorin Mlakar since 3 June 2016
Croatian Democratic Union (50)	Pero Ćosić	District V
Croatian Democratic Union (50)	Željko Dilber	District VII
Croatian Democratic Union (50)	Josip Đakić	District IV
Croatian Democratic Union (50)	Damir Felak	District II, deputizing Darko Sobota
Croatian Democratic Union (50)	Željko Fiolić	District VII
Croatian Democratic Union (50)	Željko Glasnović	Representative of the Croatian diaspora
Croatian Democratic Union (50)	Sandra Jakelić	District IX, deputizing Goran Pauk
Croatian Democratic Union (50)	Gordan Jandroković	District VI
Croatian Democratic Union (50)	Josip Križanić	District III, deputizing Darko Horvat
Croatian Democratic Union (50)	Damir Krstičević	District X
Croatian Democratic Union (50)	Marijan Kustić	District IX, deputizing Božidar Kalmeta since 4 February 2016
Croatian Democratic Union (50)	Franjo Lucić	District V
Croatian Democratic Union (50)	Božo Ljubić	Representative of the Croatian diaspora
Croatian Democratic Union (50)	Margareta Mađerić	District I
Croatian Democratic Union (50)	Ljubisa Maksimčuk	District V, deputizing Danijel Marušić
Croatian Democratic Union (50)	Goran Marić	District VI
Croatian Democratic Union (50)	Jasen Mesić	District VII
Croatian Democratic Union (50)	Andrija Mikulić	District II
Croatian Democratic Union (50)	Darko Milinović	District IX
Croatian Democratic Union (50)	Domagoj Ivan Milošević	District VII
Croatian Democratic Union (50)	Nada Murganić	District VII, deputizing Damir Jelić
Croatian Democratic Union (50)	Stjepan Pintarić	District IV, deputizing Tomislav Tolušić
Croatian Democratic Union (50)	Sanja Putica	District X
Croatian Democratic Union (50)	Ivan Radić	District IV
Croatian Democratic Union (50)	Željko Reiner	District I
Croatian Democratic Union (50)	Josipa Rimac	District IX
Croatian Democratic Union (50)	Ante Sanader	District IX
Croatian Democratic Union (50)	Anđelko Stričak	District III
Croatian Democratic Union (50)	Ivan Šipić	District IX
Croatian Democratic Union (50)	Petar Škorić	District X
Croatian Democratic Union (50)	Ivan Šuker	Representative of the Croatian diaspora
Croatian Democratic Union (50)	Miro Totgergeli	District II, deputizing Miro Kovač
Croatian Democratic Union (50)	Miroslav Tuđman	District II
Croatian Democratic Union (50)	Žarko Tušek	District III
Croatian Democratic Union (50)	Antun Vidaković	District VI, deputizing Ivo Žinić
Croatian Democratic Union (50)	Lucian Vukelić	District VIII, deputizing Oleg Butković
Croatian Democratic Union (50)	Leon Žulj	District IV, deputizing Milijan Brkić since 31 January 2016
Croatian Democratic Union (50)	Ante Župan	District IX, deputizing Tomislav Karamarko
Social Democratic Party of Croatia (42)	Vedran Babić	District II
Social Democratic Party of Croatia (42)	Arsen Bauk	District X, deputized by Tonči Bilić until 30 January 2016
Social Democratic Party of Croatia (42)	Davor Bernardić	District I
Social Democratic Party of Croatia (42)	Igor Dragovan	District I
Social Democratic Party of Croatia (42)	Sabina Glasovac	District IX
Social Democratic Party of Croatia (42)	Peđa Grbin	District VIII
Social Democratic Party of Croatia (42)	Branko Grčić	District X, deputized by Nikša Peronja until 30 January 2016
Social Democratic Party of Croatia (42)	Mario Habek	District III
Social Democratic Party of Croatia (42)	Siniša Hajdaš Dončić	District III, deputized by Dunja Špoljar until 30 January 2016
Social Democratic Party of Croatia (42)	Domagoj Hajduković	District IV
Social Democratic Party of Croatia (42)	Tihomir Jakovina	District V, deputized by Damir Rimac until 30 January 2016
Social Democratic Party of Croatia (42)	Ivo Jelušić	District VI
Social Democratic Party of Croatia (42)	Željko Jovanović	District VIII
Social Democratic Party of Croatia (42)	Ivan Klarin	District IX
Social Democratic Party of Croatia (42)	Joško Klisović	District I, deputized by Karolina Leaković until 30 January 2016
Social Democratic Party of Croatia (42)	Ana Komparić Devčić	District VIII
Social Democratic Party of Croatia (42)	Sandra Krpan	District VIII, deputizing Dino Manestar
Social Democratic Party of Croatia (42)	Boris Lalovac	District VI, deputized by Kristina Ikić-Baniček until 30 January 2016
Social Democratic Party of Croatia (42)	Gordan Maras	District II, deputized by Vesna Jakas until 30 January 2016
Social Democratic Party of Croatia (42)	Damir Mateljan	District VII
Social Democratic Party of Croatia (42)	Predrag Matić	District V, deputized by Biljana Gaća until 30 January 2016
Social Democratic Party of Croatia (42)	Zoran Milanović	District I, deputized by Melita Mulić until 30 January 2016
Social Democratic Party of Croatia (42)	Orsat Miljanić	District I, deputized by Alen Prelec until 30 January 2016
Social Democratic Party of Croatia (42)	Mirando Mrsić	District VI, deputized by Svjetlana Lazić until 30 January 2016
Social Democratic Party of Croatia (42)	Milanka Opačić	District VII, deputized by Saša Đujić until 30 January 2016
Social Democratic Party of Croatia (42)	Rajko Ostojić	District VI
Social Democratic Party of Croatia (42)	Ranko Ostojić	District IX, deputized by Franko Vidović until 30 January 2016
Social Democratic Party of Croatia (42)	Darko Parić	District X
Social Democratic Party of Croatia (42)	Davor Penić	District X, deputizing Ante Kotromanović
Social Democratic Party of Croatia (42)	Dražen Pros	District II, deputizing Josip Leko since 3 June 2016
Social Democratic Party of Croatia (42)	Zdravko Ronko	District V
Social Democratic Party of Croatia (42)	Tomislav Saucha	District VII, deputized by Nenad Livun until 30 January 2016
Social Democratic Party of Croatia (42)	Gordana Sobol	District II
Social Democratic Party of Croatia (42)	Nenad Stazić	District VII
Social Democratic Party of Croatia (42)	Damir Tomić	District IV
Social Democratic Party of Croatia (42)	Siniša Varga	District I, deputized by Snježana Bužinec until 30 January 2016
Social Democratic Party of Croatia (42)	Zoran Vasić	District VI
Social Democratic Party of Croatia (42)	Franko Vidović	District IX, deputizing Ingrid Antičević-Marinović since 3 June 2016
Social Democratic Party of Croatia (42)	Tanja Vrbat Grgić	District VIII
Social Democratic Party of Croatia (42)	Dragica Zgrebec	District III
Social Democratic Party of Croatia (42)	Mihael Zmajlović	District VII, deputized by Kristijan Rajšel until 30 January 2016
Social Democratic Party of Croatia (42)	Tomislav Žagar	District IV
Bridge of Independent Lists (15)	Ljubisa Ambrušec	District II
Bridge of Independent Lists (15)	Miro Bulj	District IX
Bridge of Independent Lists (15)	Josip Katalinić	District VII
Bridge of Independent Lists (15)	Mario Klobučić	District X
Bridge of Independent Lists (15)	Ivan Kovačić	District X
Bridge of Independent Lists (15)	Maro Kristić	District X, deputizing Božo Petrov
Bridge of Independent Lists (15)	Ivan Lovrinović	District II
Bridge of Independent Lists (15)	Juro Martinović	District VI
Bridge of Independent Lists (15)	Jasna Matulić	District VI
Bridge of Independent Lists (15)	Ivica Mišić	District V
Bridge of Independent Lists (15)	Robert Podolnjak	District III
Bridge of Independent Lists (15)	Marko Sladoljev	District VII, deputizing Slaven Dobrović
Bridge of Independent Lists (15)	Ines Strenja-Linić	District VIII
Bridge of Independent Lists (15)	Miroslav Šimić	District VI
Bridge of Independent Lists (15)	Ružica Vukovac	District V, deputizing Tomislav Panenić
Croatian People's Party – Liberal Democrats (9)	Milorad Batinić	District III
Croatian People's Party – Liberal Democrats (9)	Goran Beus Richembergh	District VI
Croatian People's Party – Liberal Democrats (9)	Štefanija Damjanović	District III, deputizing Matija Posavec
Croatian People's Party – Liberal Democrats (9)	Božica Makar	District III, deputizing Predrag Štromar
Croatian People's Party – Liberal Democrats (9)	Anka Mrak-Taritaš	District II, deputized by Melita Samoborec until 30 January 2016
Croatian People's Party – Liberal Democrats (9)	Marija Puh	District III
Croatian People's Party – Liberal Democrats (9)	Vesna Pusić	District I, deputized by Igor Kolman until 30 January 2016
Croatian People's Party – Liberal Democrats (9)	Nada Turina-Đurić	District VII
Croatian People's Party – Liberal Democrats (9)	Ivan Vrdoljak	District IV, deputized by Marijana Živko until 30 January 2016
Croatian Labourists – Labour Party (3)	Tomislav Končevski	District III
Croatian Labourists – Labour Party (3)	Jaroslav Pecnik	District IV
Croatian Labourists – Labour Party (3)	Nansi Tireli	District VIII
Croatian Party of Rights dr. Ante Starčević (3)	Pero Ćorić	District V
Croatian Party of Rights dr. Ante Starčević (3)	Ivan Kirin	District VIII
Croatian Party of Rights dr. Ante Starčević (3)	Ivan Tepeš	District IV
Istrian Democratic Assembly (3)	Tulio Demetlika	District VIII
Istrian Democratic Assembly (3)	Boris Miletić	District VIII
Istrian Democratic Assembly (3)	Giovanni Sponza	District VIII
Croatian Democratic Alliance of Slavonia and Baranja (2)	Branimir Glavaš	District IV
Croatian Democratic Alliance of Slavonia and Baranja (2)	Josip Salapić	District IV, deputizing Vladimir Šišljagić
Croatian Dialogue Initiative (2)	Irena Petrijevčanin Vuksanović	District I, elected as a Most candidate
Croatian Dialogue Initiative (2)	Drago Prgomet	District I, elected as a Most candidate
Croatian Party of Pensioners (2)	Silvano Hrelja	District VIII
Croatian Party of Pensioners (2)	Marija Ilić	District V
Croatian Peasant Party (2)	Branko Hrg	District II
Croatian Peasant Party (2)	Davor Vlaović	District V, deputizing Božo Galić after the resignation of Davor Miličević, since 5 February 2016
Croatian Social Liberal Party (2)	Dario Hrebak	District II
Croatian Social Liberal Party (2)	Darinko Kosor	District I
Independent Democratic Serb Party (2)	Mile Horvat	Special representative of the Serb minority
Independent Democratic Serb Party (2)	Milorad Pupovac	Special representative of the Serb minority
Milan Bandić 365 (2)	Miodrag Demo	District VI
Milan Bandić 365 (2)	Sandra Perković	District II, deputizing Milan Bandić
Bloc Pensioners Together (1)	Milivoj Špika	District X
Croatian Christian Democratic Party (1)	Goran Dodig	District X
Croatian Growth (1)	Ladislav Ilčić	District III, member of the HDZ club
Human Shield (1)	Ivan Vilibor Šinčić	District VII
Independent List Stipe Petrina (1)	Stipe Petrina	District IX, elected as a Most candidate; member of the HSU club
Reformists (1)	Radimir Čačić	District III
Independents (7)	Vladimir Bilek	Special representative of Czech and Slovak minorities; member of the BM 365 club
Independents (7)	Ermina Lekaj Prljaskaj	Special representative of the Albanian and four other minorities; member of the BM 365 club
Independents (7)	Šandor Juhas	Special representative of the Hungarian minority, member of the HRID club
Independents (7)	Veljko Kajtazi	Special representative of the Roma and eleven other minorities; member of the HNS club
Independents (7)	Furio Radin	Special representative of the Italian minority; member of the IDS club
Independents (7)	Mirko Rašković	Special representative of the Serbian minority; elected as an SDSS candidate, member of the HDZ club, later switched to the BM 365 club
Independents (7)	Gordana Rusak	District I, elected as a Most candidate, until 18 January 2016 HRID, after that member of the HSLS club

== Changes ==
Note that a number of MPs who are high-ranking members of parties in the ruling coalition were subsequently appointed to various ministerial and governmental positions, while others continued to serve as city mayors. In such cases they are required by Croatian law to put their parliamentary mandate on hold for the duration of their other term of office and in the meantime their seats are then taken by a party-appointed replacement MP. Those replacements are documented above. The changes which resulted in club changes or occurred after the inauguration of the new government are shown here as well.

Date	Constituency	Loss	Gain	Note
22 December 2015	12th district	SDSS	independent (politician)	Mirko Rašković left SDSS
18 January 2016	1st district		independent (politician)	Gordana Rusak left HRID
30 January 2016	4th district	SDP	HNS-LD	Ivan Vrdoljak returned to parliament
31 January 2016	4th district	HDZ	HDZ	Milijan Brkić left parliament
5 February 2016	5th district	HDZ	HSS	Davor Miličević left parliament
May 2016	10th district	BUZ	BUZ	Milivoj Špika switched from the HSLS group to the BM 365 group
