= Drago Prgomet =

Croatian physician, university professor and politician (born 1965)

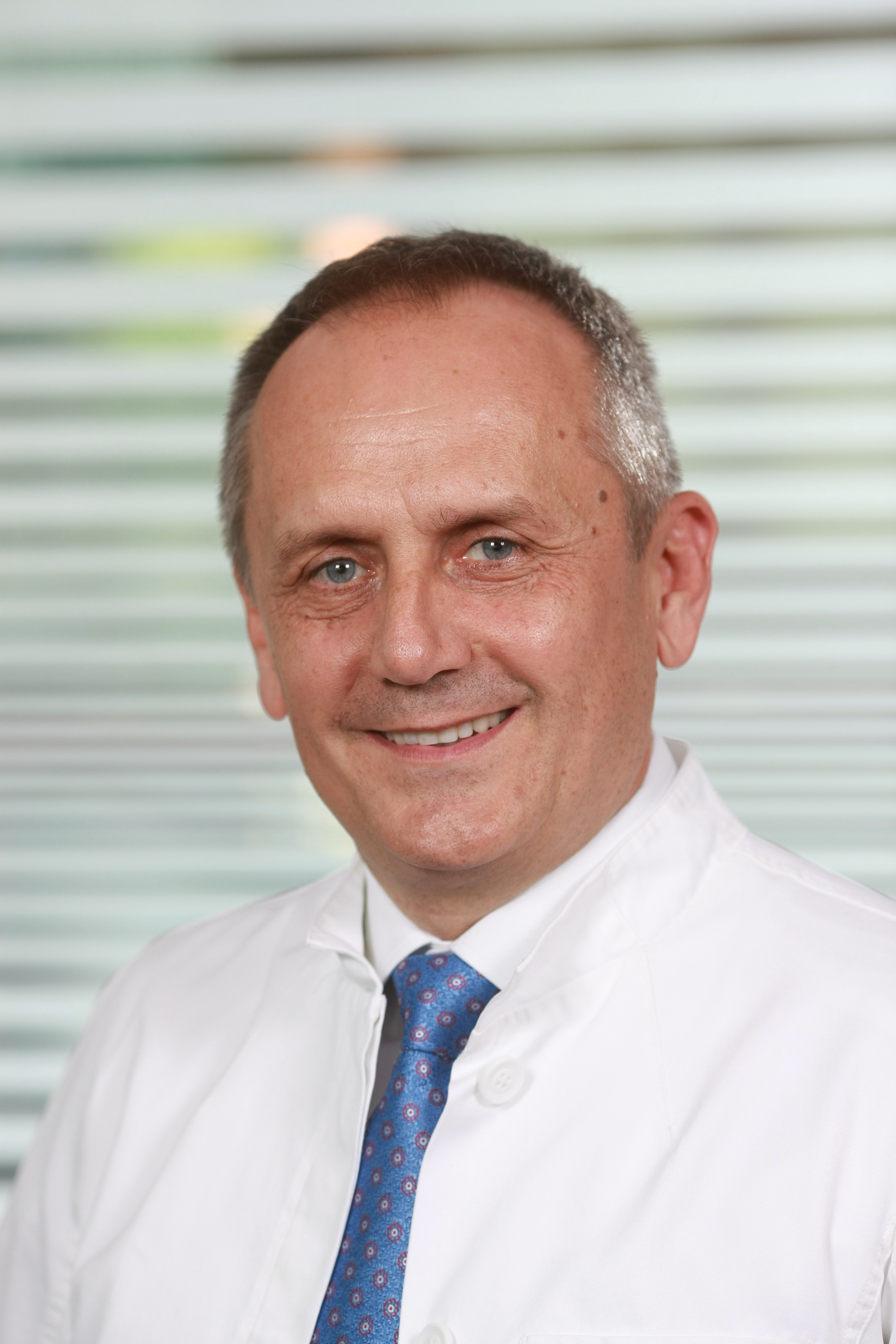
- Drago Progmet

President of the Zagreb Assembly
- In office 18 April 2019 – 17 June 2021
- Preceded by: Andrija Mikulić
- Succeeded by: Joško Klisović

Member of Parliament
- In office 28 December 2015 – 1 December 2017
- Succeeded by: Stipo Šapina
- Constituency: I electoral district
- In office 22 December 2003 – 10 May 2006
- Succeeded by: Vladimir Štengl
- Constituency: V electoral district

Vice President of the Croatian Democratic Union
- In office 25 May 2012 – 27 February 2015

Personal details
- Born: 23 May 1965 (age 61) Žeravac near Derventa, SFR Yugoslavia (now Bosnia and Herzegovina)
- Party: HDZ (1996–2015, 2016–present); MOST (2015); HRID (2015–2016)
- Spouse: Sanja Prgomet
- Education: University of Banja Luka; University of Zagreb
- Profession: Physician

Drago Prgomet (born 23 May 1965) is a Croatian physician, university professor and politician. He served as a Member of Croatian Parliament, later as President of the Zagreb Assembly, as well as a head of Department of Ear, Nose, Throat, and Head and Neck Surgery at the University Hospital Centre Zagreb, and head of Department of Otorhinolaryngology with Audiology and Phoniatry of the Zagreb School of Medicine.

== Early life and education ==
Prgomet was born on 23 May 1965, in the village of Žeravac near Derventa, today in Bosnia and Herzegovina. He has 6 brothers and sisters. His father Ivica died when he was six years old. Although his mother Iva was a single mother, the family lived very well. He and his brothers and sisters were earning extra money by working during the summertime. Almost all of them graduated from the university.

Prgomet graduated medicine from the University of Banja Luka in 1990, after which he continued his postgraduate studies at the University of Zagreb. In addition to dozens of professional and scientific works in the field of medicine, he published a book of stories from the Croatian War of Independence, in which he actively participated, Sakupljač gelera (English: Collector of shrapnel).

== Politics ==
Prgomet entered politics in 1996 as a member of the conservative Croatian Democratic Union (HDZ). He was elected to the Croatian Parliament from the HDZ list in year 2003. At the 15th HDZ General Assembly that was held on 25 May 2012 he was elected vice president of the party. Prgomet presented his candidacy for the position of the vice president together with Milan Kujundžić, whom he supported as a candidate for party president, that ran against Tomislav Karamarko.

After the 15th General Assembly Prgomet and newly elected party president Karamarko have not managed to establish good relationship, have not even spoken at all, which culminated on 27 February 2015, in Progmet's resignation from the position of the HDZ vice president as well as from the party membership.

In September 2015 he joined the Bridge of Independent Lists (MOST). He was elected to the Croatian Parliament from the Bridge of Independent Lists list on 2015 parliamentary elections with more than 20,000 preferential votes. On 11 November 2015 he was expelled from the party for holding private talks with Prime Minister Zoran Milanović without the knowledge of other members of the party's leadership. On 22 November 2015 he announced the formation of a new political party called Croatian Dialogue Initiative (Hrvatska inicijativa za dijalog, abbreviated as HRID, the Croatian word for islet).
