= Osijek prison massacre =

1945 killings in Croatia

Osijek prison massacre was a massacre which was committed by the members of OZNA.

Shortly after Second World War finished, 25 October 1945, they killed 48 Croatian war prisoners by throwing bombs and shooting them with firearms.

Prisoners were situated in Osijek prison without water and food in unhygienic conditions. When they referred to the Geneva Convention, members of OZNA came and killed them all.

Seventy-one years after the crime, Dragan Vulin, deputy of Osijek-Baranja county, Croatian defenders, domobrans and members of Croatian Army, revealed a memorial plaque on 25 October 2016 in remembrance of this crime.

Croatian president Kolinda Grabar-Kitarović send a letter in which she stressed importance of discovering mass partisan and Yugoslav crimes against Croats and other people.
