= Croatian Demochristian Party =

Croatian political party

Croatian Demochristian Party Hrvatska demokršćanska stranka
- Leader: Goran Dodig
- International Secretary: Hrvoje Zekanović
- Founded: 21 February 2009
- Headquarters: Zagreb, Croatia
- Membership (2022): 1,089
- Ideology: Christian democracy; Conservatism
- Political position: Centre-right to right-wing
- European affiliation: European People's Party
- Colours: Blue
- Sabor: 1 / 151
- European Parliament: 0 / 12

Website
- demokrscanihds.hr

The Croatian Demochristian Party (Croatian: Hrvatska demokršćanska stranka or HDS) is a Christian democratic political party in Croatia.

It was formed in 2009 from a merger of three minor Christian Democratic parties:

- Croatian Demochristians (Croatian: Hrvatski demokršćani, HD)
- Croatian Christian Democratic Party (Croatian: Hrvatska kršćanska demokratska stranka, HKDS)
- Party of Croatian Renaissance (Croatian: Stranka hrvatskog proljeća, SHP)

Presidents of these three parties — Ante Ledić, Petar Kaćunko and Goran Dodig — signed a treaty that allowed for the Croatian Christian Democratic Party to be founded on 21 February 2009 in Zagreb.

The founders of the party said that their goal is to change the ideals of Croatia so that Croats will not care solely about the material realm, but also about spiritual and moral values. Also, Kaćunko said that the party will care for the general good, not for the interests of one man.

The president of the party is Goran Dodig, and there are two vice-presidents are Ante Ledić and Petar Kaćunko.

Since November 2023, HDS is a member party of the European People's Party.

== History ==
=== Croatian Christian Democratic Party ===
The Croatian Christian Democratic Party was created in 1990 and modelled after the Christian Democrat parties of Western Europe, although, due to specific circumstances of early 1990s Croatia, it had more right-wing than centre-right rhetoric.

In the 1990 Croatian parliamentary election, it joined the bloc of moderate nationalists called Coalition of People's Accord. Like all parties of that bloc, it fared badly; however, one year later, it had a ministerial post in the "National Unity" government of Franjo Gregurić.

In the 1992 Croatian parliamentary election, HKDS, running on its own ticket, failed to enter Croatian Parliament, while its leader Ivan Cesar finished seventh in the presidential race. This fiasco led HKDS to unite with Croatian Democratic Party (HDS) into Croatian Christian Democratic Union. The dissident faction of HKDS continued to operate under the party's old name.

=== Party of Croatian Renaissance ===
Party of Croatian Renaissance was a regional political party in Split-Dalmatia County of Croatia that splintered from the Croatian Social Liberal Party and was named after the Croatian Spring.

=== Croatian Christian Democrats ===
Croatian Christian Democrats was a minor right-wing conservative political party that was founded in 2002.

== Election results ==
=== Presidential ===
The following is a list of presidential candidates endorsed by HDZ in elections for President of Croatia.

| Election | Candidate | 1st round | | 2nd round | | Result |
| Election | Candidate | Votes | % | Votes | % | Result |
|---|---|---|---|---|---|---|
| 2019–20 | end. Kolinda Grabar-Kitarović (HDZ) | 507,628 | 26.65 (#2) | 929,707 | 47.34 (#2) | Lost |
| 2024–25 | end. Dragan Primorac (Ind.) | 314,663 | 15.59 (#2) | 380,752 | 25.32 (#2) | Lost |

=== Legislative ===
| Election | Coalition with | Votes | % | Seats | +/– | Government |
| Election | Coalition with | Coalition | | HDS | | Government |
|---|---|---|---|---|---|---|
| 2011 | JH-ABH | 13,412 | 0.57% | 0 / 151 | New | Extra-parliamentary |
| 2015 | Patriotic Coalition | 746,626 | 33.36% | 0 / 151 | 0 | Extra-parliamentary |
| 2016 | HDZ-HSLS-HRAST | 682,687 | 36.27% | 1 / 151 | ▲1 | Government support |
| 2020 | NS-R-HSS BR-NSH (2nd el. district), HDZ-HSLS–HDSSB (10th el. district) | 16,900 (NS-R coal.), 621,035 (HDZ coal.) | 1.01% (NS-R coal.), 37.26% (HDZ coal.) | 1 / 151 | 0 | Government support |
| 2024 | HDZ–HSLS–HNS–HSU | 729,949 | 34.44 | 1 / 151 | 0 | TBA |

=== European Parliament ===
| Election | In coalition with | Votes won (coalition totals) | Percentage | Seats won (HDS only) | Change |
|---|---|---|---|---|---|
| 2014 | HDZ-HSS-HSP AS-BUZ-ZDS | 381,844 | 41.42% | 0 / 11 | Steady |
| 2019 | None | 3,651 | 0.33% | 0 / 12 | Steady |
