= 2015 Croatian parliamentary election =

- 8 November 2015
- All 151 seats in the Croatian Parliament; 76 seats needed for a majority
- Opinion polls
- Turnout: 63.06% (▲6.77pp)
| Party | Leader | Vote % | Seats | +/– |
|---|---|---|---|---|
| Patriotic Coalition | Tomislav Karamarko | 34.64 | 59 | +12 |
| Croatia is Growing | Zoran Milanović | 33.38 | 56 | −27 |
| Most | Božo Petrov | 13.64 | 19 | New |
| Human Shield | Collective leadership | 4.54 | 1 | New |
| Labour & Solidarity | Milan Bandić | 3.39 | 2 | New |
| IDS–PGS–Rl | Boris Miletić | 1.90 | 3 | 0 |
| Successful Croatia | Radimir Čačić | 1.57 | 1 | New |
| HDSSB | Dragan Vulin | 1.37 | 2 | −4 |
Minority lists
| SDSS | Vojislav Stanimirović | 77.63 | 3 | 0 |
| MESZ | Sándor Juhás | 50.23 | 1 | 0 |
| Kali Sara | Veljko Kajtazi | 41.41 | 1 | New |
| Independents | — | – | 3 | +2 |
This lists parties that won seats. See the complete results below.
Result by constituency
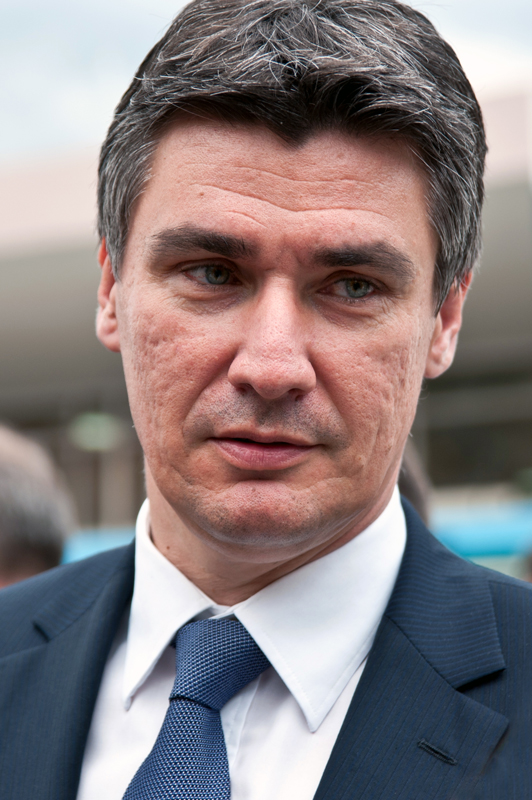

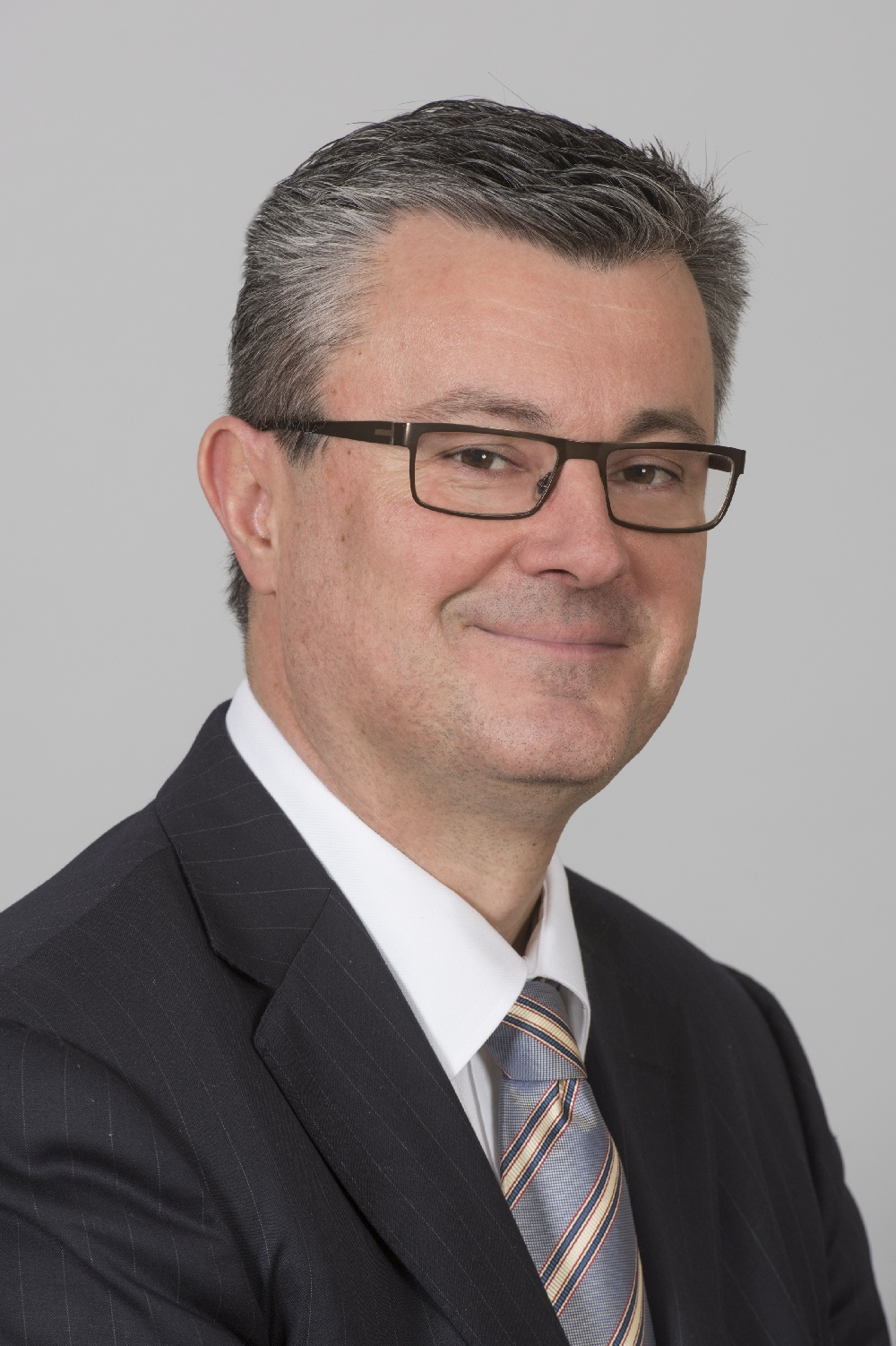
| Prime Minister before | Prime Minister after |
|---|---|
| Zoran Milanović; SDP | Tihomir Orešković; Non-partisan |

Parliamentary elections were held in Croatia on 8 November 2015. All 151 seats in the Parliament were up for election. This parliamentary election was the 8th since the first multi-party election in 1990 and the first since Croatia joined the European Union in 2013. The ruling center-left Croatia is Growing coalition, led by Prime Minister Zoran Milanović, was challenged by the center-right Patriotic Coalition led by the HDZ and headed by its party chairman Tomislav Karamarko, and also faced several new political coalitions.

The elections produced a hung parliament, with the ruling Croatia is Growing coalition winning 56 seats in the 10 electoral constituencies within Croatia and 3 of the 8 representatives of national minorities (Ermina Lekaj-Prljaskaj and Veljko Kajtazi are members of HNS and Sándor Juhász is a member of SDP). The opposition Patriotic Coalition won 56 seats within Croatia and all three seats allocated to Croatian citizens living abroad, winning 59 seats, technically tying with the ruling coalition. The IDS-PGS-RI coalition was expected to side with Croatia is Growing, as well as the remaining 5 minority representatives, giving Prime Minister Milanović's coalition 67 seats to 59 for Karamarko's opposition coalition. This left Milanović 9 seats short of a majority, while Karamarko needed 17 seats.

The third-placed MOST led by Metković mayor Božo Petrov, which won 19 seats, was expected to be the deciding factor in the formation of the next government of Croatia. After the election Drago Prgomet of MOST stated that neither Milanović nor Karamarko would be their choice for Prime Minister and that MOST will decide on who will head the 13th government of Croatia. Some within MOST had stated they prefer the formation of a national unity government made up of HDZ, SDP and MOST, though this was considered extremely unlikely. On 11 November Patriotic coalition leader Karamarko openly rejected the prospect of an HDZ-SDP-MOST government. This was followed by more than 45 days of negotiations between all three coalitions.

On 22 December it was stated that Croatia is Growing would form a government with MOST, however, on 23 December, MOST decided to give its support to a government with the HDZ. The coalition was further supported by Milan Bandić 365 and two independent minority representatives, giving them a slim majority of 78 seats in Parliament, two more than the required 76 seats. They nominated a Croatian-Canadian businessman named Tihomir Orešković, who was generally unknown to the public and who had spent most of his life in Canada, to be the next prime minister. A new government finally took office on 22 January 2016 with Orešković as the 11th Prime Minister, after a record 76 days of negotiations.

== Background ==
The 2011 general election was held on 4 December 2011 and resulted in the victory of the center-left Kukuriku coalition led by the Social Democratic Party and supported by the Croatian People's Party – Liberal Democrats, Croatian Party of Pensioners and the Istrian Democratic Assembly. The largest opposition party is the center-right Croatian Democratic Union. Other smaller opposition parties are the Croatian Labourists – Labour Party and the Croatian Democratic Alliance of Slavonia and Baranja.

The previous 7th Assembly of the Croatian Parliament was dissolved on 28 September 2015, with the President of Croatia Kolinda Grabar-Kitarović subsequently being tasked with scheduling the elections on a Sunday within 60 days of the dissolution.

== Electoral system ==
Elections were held in 10 electoral districts inside Croatia each with a roughly equal number of registered voters and 14 seats, supplemented by one electoral district for Croatian citizens living abroad (3 seats), and one electoral district for national minorities (8 seats). Parties or alliances had to pass a 5% threshold in each electoral district in order to qualify for seats, which were then distributed proportionally between the qualified lists using the D'Hondt method. As voters were allowed to select both a list and a candidate from it, the ranking of candidates on the list was superseded by voter selection wherever candidates got at least 10% of the list's votes.

=== Electoral law amendments ===
In February 2015 the Croatian parliament voted to amend the country's election rules by introducing a number of changes, most importantly introducing an element of preferential voting by letting candidate selection function as a most open list system for candidates receiving a minimum of 10%, while keeping list ranking for those that do not meet this quota. In addition there were several other changes, including a gender quota, a ban on convicted criminals running, new rules for monitoring of the elections, changes to the way media covers elections etc. The proposal came from the ruling Social Democratic Party as well as several other minor changes. The opposition left Parliament and did not participate in the voting process. However, on 25 September 2015 the Constitutional Court of Croatia ruled that some of the changes to the electoral law were unconstitutional, including a ban on criminals convicted for misuse of position running for office, while maintaining this ban for other offences, an electoral list quota of 40% candidates of each gender and an obligation to collect 1,500 signatures for a political party to run in an electoral district.

== Political parties ==
| Name | Abbr. | Ideology | Political spectrum | Leader | Seats 2011 | Seats before election | Electoral districts |
Croatia is Growing coalition
| Social Democratic Party of Croatia; Socijaldemokratska partija Hrvatske | SDP | Social democracy | Centre-left | Zoran Milanović | 61 | 56 | all but XI |
| Croatian People's Party-Liberal Democrats; Hrvatska narodna stranka - liberalni demokrati | HNS | Liberalism, Economic liberalism, Progressivism | Centre left | Vesna Pusić | 14 | 11 | all but XI |
| Croatian Labourists - Labour Party; Hrvatski laburisti - stranka rada | Laburisti | Labor rights | Left-wing | Nansi Tireli | 6 | 2 | all but XI |
| Croatian Party of Pensioners; Hrvatska stranka umirovljenika | HSU | Single-issue politics (pensioner's rights) | Centre-left | Silvano Hrelja | 3 | 4 | all but XI |
| Authentic Croatian Peasant Party | A-HSS | Agrarianism | Centre-right | Stanko Grčić | 0 | 0 | all but XI |
| Zagorje Party | ZS | Regionalism (Hrvatsko Zagorje) | Centre | Miljenko Jerneić | 0 | 0 | all but XI |
Patriotic Coalition
| Croatian Democratic Union; Hrvatska demokratska zajednica | HDZ | Christian democracy, Social conservatism | Centre-right | Tomislav Karamarko | 44 | 42 | all |
| Croatian Party of Rights dr. Ante Starčević; Hrvatska stranka prava dr. Ante Starčević | HSP AS | National conservatism | Right-wing | Ivan Tepeš | 1 | 1 | all |
| Croatian Peasant Party; Hrvatska seljačka stranka | HSS | Agrarianism, Christian democracy, Social conservatism | Centre-right | Branko Hrg | 1 | 1 | all |
| Croatian Social Liberal Party; Hrvatska socijalno liberalna stranka | HSLS | Liberalism | Centre | Darinko Kosor | 0 | 0 | all |
| Bloc Pensioners Together | BUZ | Single-issue politics (Pensioners' rights) | | Milivoj Špika | 0 | | all |
| Croatian Growth | Hrast | Social conservatism | | Ladislav Ilčić | Did not exist | 0 | all |
| Croatian Christian Democratic Party | HDS | Christian democracy | | Goran Dodig | 0 | 0 | all |
| Democratic Party of Zagorje | ZDS | Regionalism (Hrvatsko Zagorje) | | Stanko Belina | 0 | 0 | all |
"The Right to Our Own" coalition
| Istrian Democratic Assembly; Istarski demokratski sabor | IDS | Istrian regionalism, social liberalism | Centre-left | Boris Miletić | 3 | 2 | VIII |
| Alliance of Primorje-Gorski Kotar; Primorsko goranski savez | PGS | Regionalism (Primorje-Gorski Kotar) | | Darijo Vasilić | 0 | 0 | VIII |
| List for Rijeka; Lista za Rijeku | RI | Regionalism (Rijeka) | | | 0 | 0 | VIII |
Successful Croatia coalition
| People's Party - Reformists; Narodna stranka - Reformisti | Reformisti | Economic liberalism | Centre | Radimir Čačić | Did not exist | 3 | all |
| Forward Croatia! - Progressive Alliance; Naprijed Hrvatska! - Progresivni savez | Naprijed Hrvatska! | Progressivism, Social democracy | Centre-left | Ivo Josipović | Did not exist | 1 | all |
| Party of Croatian Pensioners, Green Forum, Dubrovnik Democratic Assembly | Umirovljenici, ZF, DDS | | | | 0 | 0 | all |
Labour and Solidarity Coalition
| Milan Bandić 365 - The Party of Labour and Solidarity; Milan Bandić 365 - stranka rada i solidarnosti | Bandić 365 | Populism | Centre | Milan Bandić | Did not exist | 0 | all |
| Istrian democrats Istarski demokrati | ID-DI | Regionalism | Centre-left | Damir Kajin | Did not exist | 1 | all |
| New wave- Party of Development; Novi val-Stranka razvoja | Novi val | Social Democratic | Centre-left | Ljubo Jurčić | Did not exist | 1 | all |
| Democratic Party of Prigorje and Zagreb, Democratic Women's Party, European Party of Croatia, Croatian Workers' Party, Croatian Party of Greens – Eco-Alliance, Međimurje Party, Independent Croatian Farmers, Pensioners' Party, Pensioners' Democratic Union, Green Alliance, Green Party | DPS, DSŽ, HES, HRS, Zeleni, MS, SU, UDU, Zeleni, ZS | | | | 0 | 0 | all |
Coalition "Ready"
| Croatian Conservative Party; Hrvatska konzervativna stranka | HKS | National conservatism, Economic liberalism | Right-wing | Ruža Tomašić | Did not exist | 0 | all |
| Croatian Party of Rights; Hrvatska stranka prava | HSP | National liberalism, Croatian nationalism, Euroscepticism | far right | Daniel Srb | 0 | 0 | all |
| Family Party; Obiteljska stranka | OS | Social conservatism | Right-wing | Mate Knezović | 0 | 0 | all |
Not part of any coalition
| Croatian Democratic Alliance of Slavonia and Baranja; Hrvatski demokratski savez Slavonije i Baranje | HDSSB | Slavonian regionalism, Conservativism | Right-wing | Dragan Vulin | 6 | 7 | IV, V |
| Croatian Citizen Party; Hrvatska građanska stranka | HGS | Right-wing populism | Centre-right | Željko Kerum | 2 | 2 | IX, X |
| Sustainable Development of Croatia; Održivi razvoj Hrvatske | ORaH | Sustainable development, Environmentalism, Progressivism | Centre-left | Mirela Holy | Did not exist | 3 | all |
| Bridge of Independent Lists; Most nezavisnih lista | Most | Fiscal conservatism, Economic liberalism | Centre-right | Božo Petrov | Did not exist | 0 | all |
| Human Blockade; Živi zid | Živi zid | Populism, Anti-establishment, Euroscepticism | Centre | Five Co-presidents | Did not exist | 0 | all but XI (joint list with AM in IX) |
| Youth Action; Akcija mladih | AM | | | | 0 | 0 | all but XI (joint list with Živi zid in IX) |
| In the Name of the Family – Project Homeland; U Ime Obitelji – projekt Domovina | UiO-projekt Domovina | Social conservatism, Political Catholicism | Right-wing | Željka Markić | Did not exist | 0 | all |
| Authentic Croatian Party of Rights; Autohtona – Hrvatska stranka prava | A-HSP | | | | 0 | 0 | all |
| Croatian Christian Democratic Union, Croatian Democratic Party, National Democrats | HKDU, HDS, ND | | | | 0 | 0 | I, III, V–VII, IX–XI |
| Croatian Dawn – Party of the People; Hrvatska Zora Stranka Naroda | HZ | Social conservatism, Christian democracy | Right-wing | Milan Kujundžić | Did not exist | 0 | I, II, VI, VII, IX, X |
| Socialist Labour Party of Croatia; Socijalistička radnička partija | SRP | Communism | Far-left | Vladimir Kapularin | 0 | 0 | II, III, VIII, X, XI |
| For the City; Za Grad | Za Grad | | | | Did not exist | 0 | I, II, VI, VII |
| Defenders' Patriotic Party of Croatia; Braniteljsko Domoljubna Stranka Hrvatske | BDSH | | | | 0 | 0 | I, III, IV, VII |
| Workers' Front; Radnička fronta | RF | Democratic socialism | Far-left | collective leadership | Did not exist | 0 | I, VI, VIII |
| Smart; Pametno | Pametno | Economic liberalism | Centre | Marijana Puljak | Did not exist | 0 | I, VII, X |
| Together Movement; Pokret Zajedno | Pokret Zajedno | | | | Did not exist | 0 | I, VII, VIII |
| Croatian Party of Order; Hrvatska stranka reda | HSR | | | | Did not exist | 0 | II |
| Međimurje Democratic Alliance; Međimurske demokratski savez | MDS | | | | Did not exist | 0 | III |
| Democratic Union of National Renewal – Right; Demokratski Savez Nacionalne Obnove – Desno | Desno | National conservatism, Croatian nationalism | Far-right | Anto Đapić | Did not exist | 0 | IV |

== Opinion polls ==
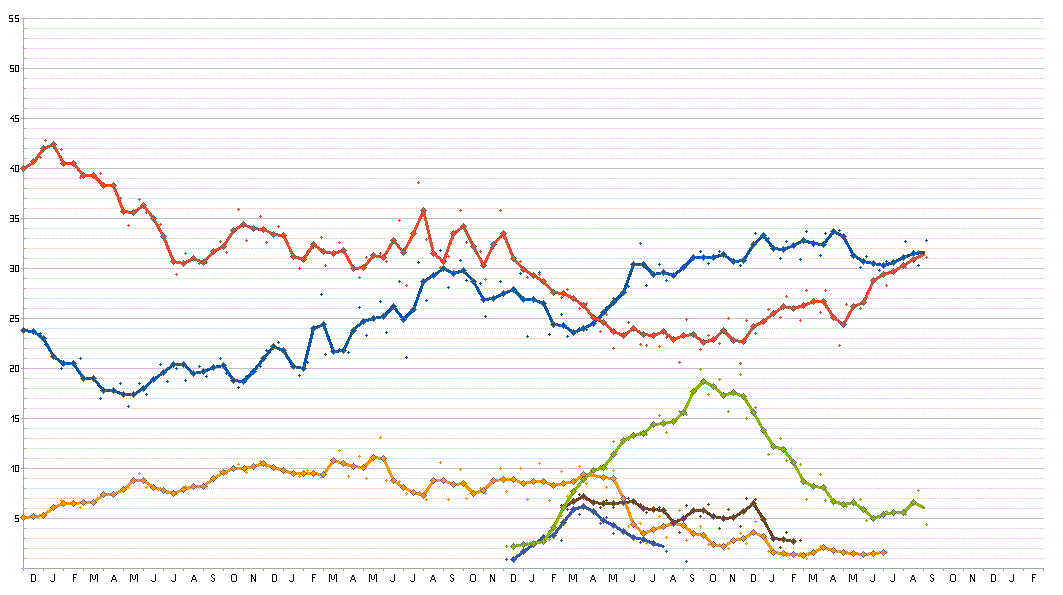
15-day average trend line of poll results from December 2011 to the present day, with each line corresponding to a political party.

== Results ==
Results by municipality, shaded according to winning party's percentage of the vote.: HDZ—>80% HDZ—70–80% HDZ—60–70% HDZ—50–60% HDZ—40–50% HDZ—<40% / SDP—>80% SDP—70–80% SDP—60–70% SDP—50–60% SDP—40–50% SDP—<40% / IDS—50–60% IDS—40–50% IDS—<40% BM365—40–50% HDSSB—<40% Most—40–50% Živi zid—<40%

On November 9, 2015, State Election Commission published only the provisional official results from the 99.9% of regular polling stations because elections were repeated in 7 polling stations due to irregularities on election day. Final results were announced on 24 November.

Centre-right Patriotic Coalition won 59 seats, centre-left Croatia is Growing coalition 58 (2 national minority representatives side with the Croatian People's Party - Liberal Democrats), centre Bridge of Independent Lists 19, centre-left Istrian Democratic Assembly 3, right wing Croatian Democratic Alliance of Slavonia and Baranja and centre Milan Bandić 365 - The Party of Labour and Solidarity 2 each, centre Human Blockade and centre People's Party - Reformists 1 each. As for the 8 mandates of minority representatives, 3 go to Croatia is Growing because those representatives are members of HNS party or its parliamentary club, while Independent Democratic Serb Party that won 3 seats confirmed that it would negotiate with Croatia is Growing. In addition, Istrian Democratic Assembly also confirmed that it would negotiate only with Croatia is Growing.

A total of 17 parties won representation in the 8th assembly of the Croatian Parliament: HDZ (51), SDP (42 + 1 representative of national minorities), MOST (19), HNS (9 + 2 national minority representatives), Labourists (3), IDS (3), HSP-AS (3), HSU (2), HSLS (2), Bandić Milan 365 (2), HDSSB (2), BUZ (1), HSS (1), Human Blockade (1), HRAST (1), HDS (1) and Reformists (1). Such a fractured political situation meant that forming a stable majority that would serve a full 4-year term would be a challenge. Furthermore, the total number of MOST's seats in Parliament, who held the balance of power, fell from 19 to 15 within months of election day, namely Drago Prgomet, who was expelled from MOST only four days after the election, founded his own party Croatian Dialogue Initiative (HRID), which two more MOST parliamentarians soon jointed, while Stipe Petrina another MOST MP became an independent.

National minorities elected 8 representatives through a separate election system: Milorad Pupovac (75,9% of votes), Mile Horvat (59,2%) and Mirko Rašković (54,4%) for the Serb national minority, Sándor Juhász (50,2%) for the Hungarian minority, Furio Radin (65,8%) for the Italian minority, Vladimir Bilek (75,7%) for the Czech and Slovak minorities, Veljko Kajtazi (41,4%) for the Austrian, Bulgarian, German, Jewish, Polish, Roma, Romanian, Rusyn, Russian, Turkish, Ukrainian, Vlach minorities and Ermina Lekaj Prljaskaj (21,1%) for the Albanian, Bosniak, Macedonian, Montenegrin and Slovene minorities.

| Party | Votes | % | Seats | +/– |
|---|---|---|---|---|
| Patriotic Coalition (HDZ–HSS–HSP AS–BUZ–HSLS–Hrast–HDS–ZDS) | 771,070 | 34.64 | 59 | +10 |
| Croatia is Growing (SDP–HNS–HSU–HLSR–A-HSS–ZS) | 742,909 | 33.38 | 56 | –18 |
| Bridge of Independents | 303,564 | 13.64 | 19 | New |
| Human Shield–Youth Action | 101,073 | 4.54 | 1 | New |
| Labour and Solidarity (BM 365–DPS–DSŽ–HES–HRS–ID–MS–NSH–NV–SU–UDU–Zeleni–ZS) | 75,527 | 3.39 | 2 | +2 |
| Right to Our Own (IDS–PGS–RI) | 42,193 | 1.90 | 3 | 0 |
| Sustainable Development of Croatia | 39,090 | 1.76 | 0 | New |
| Successful Croatia (NS-R–NHPS–Pensioners–ZF–DDS) | 34,905 | 1.57 | 1 | +1 |
| Croatian Democratic Alliance of Slavonia and Baranja | 30,443 | 1.37 | 2 | –4 |
| In the Name of the Family – Project Homeland | 23,866 | 1.07 | 0 | New |
| HKS–HSP–OS | 14,101 | 0.63 | 0 | – |
| Authentic Croatian Party of Rights | 12,027 | 0.54 | 0 | – |
| Pametno | 6,001 | 0.27 | 0 | – |
| Croatian Dawn – Party of the People | 4,487 | 0.20 | 0 | – |
| HKDU–HDS–ND | 3,010 | 0.14 | 0 | – |
| Za Grad | 2,548 | 0.11 | 0 | – |
| Socialist Labour Party of Croatia | 2,528 | 0.11 | 0 | – |
| Croatian Civic Party | 2,234 | 0.10 | 0 | – |
| Veterans' Patriotic Party of Croatia | 1,645 | 0.07 | 0 | – |
| Democratic Alliance of National Reconstruction | 1,548 | 0.07 | 0 | – |
| Workers' Front | 1,293 | 0.06 | 0 | – |
| Together Movement | 961 | 0.04 | 0 | – |
| Međimurje Democratic Alliance | 762 | 0.03 | 0 | – |
| Croatian Party of Order | 162 | 0.01 | 0 | – |
| Independents | 7,976 | 0.36 | 0 | – |
| National minorities | | | 8 | 0 |
| Total | 2,225,923 | 100.00 | 151 | 0 |
| Valid votes | 2,225,923 | 98.26 | | |
| Invalid/blank votes | 39,367 | 1.74 | | |
| Total votes | 2,265,290 | 100.00 | | |
| Registered voters/turnout | 3,592,341 | 63.06 | | |
Source: State Election Committee; Dnevnik

=== Minority seats ===
| Candidate | Party | Votes | % |
Albanians, Bosniaks, Montenegrins, Macedonians and Slovenes
| Ermina Lekaj Prljaskaj | FAI–KUANM–HASI–UKURH | 999 | 21.19 |
| Idris Sulejmani | Albanian Community of Istria County | 994 | 21.09 |
| Nedžad Hodžić | Bosniak Democratic Party of Croatia | 755 | 16.02 |
| Mirsad Srebreniković | Party of Democratic Action | 711 | 15.08 |
| Jonuz Aliti | Independent | 375 | 7.96 |
| Alen Džomba | Forward Croatia! | 306 | 6.49 |
| Alija Avdić | Bosnian Party of Croatia | 176 | 3.73 |
| Sabina Koželj-horvat | Slovenian Cultural Society | 143 | 3.03 |
| Senad Pršić | Bosnian National Community | 128 | 2.72 |
| Lutvija Graca | Independent | 52 | 1.10 |
| Sulejman Tabaković | Independent | 45 | 0.95 |
| Suad Salkić | Independent | 30 | 0.64 |
| Total | | 4,714 | 100.00 |
| Valid votes | | 4,714 | 98.95 |
| Invalid/blank votes | | 50 | 1.05 |
| Total votes | | 4,764 | 100.00 |
| Registered voters/turnout | | 26,774 | 17.79 |
Austrians, Bulgarians, Germans, Poles, Roma, Romanians, Ruthenians, Russians, Turks, Ukrainians, Vlachs and Jews
| Veljko Kajtazi | Croatian Romani Union "Kali Sara" | 1,913 | 41.41 |
| Željko Balog | Forward Croatia! | 778 | 16.84 |
| Muhamed Zahirović | Labour and Solidarity Coalition | 638 | 13.81 |
| Robert Bosak | Luna | 539 | 11.67 |
| Duško Kostić | Independent | 258 | 5.58 |
| Dubravka Rašljanin | Russian Association | 182 | 3.94 |
| Renata Trischler | German Union | 131 | 2.84 |
| Vesna Pichler | Association of Germans and Austrians | 61 | 1.32 |
| Jelena Zaričnaja Jindra | Union of Russians | 58 | 1.26 |
| Bari Ahmedi | Independent | 44 | 0.95 |
| Zvonko Kalanjoš | Independent | 18 | 0.39 |
| Total | | 4,620 | 100.00 |
| Valid votes | | 4,620 | 98.42 |
| Invalid/blank votes | | 74 | 1.58 |
| Total votes | | 4,694 | 100.00 |
| Registered voters/turnout | | 14,093 | 33.31 |
Czechs and Slovaks
| Vladimir Bilek | Independent | 1,598 | 75.73 |
| Ivan Komak | Independent | 512 | 24.27 |
| Total | | 2,110 | 100.00 |
| Valid votes | | 2,110 | 99.20 |
| Invalid/blank votes | | 17 | 0.80 |
| Total votes | | 2,127 | 100.00 |
| Registered voters/turnout | | 6,456 | 32.95 |
Hungarians
| Šandor Juhas | Alliance of Hungarian Associations | 2,218 | 50.23 |
| Róbert Jankovics | Democratic Union of Hungarians of Croatia | 2,198 | 49.77 |
| Total | | 4,416 | 100.00 |
| Valid votes | | 4,416 | 98.68 |
| Invalid/blank votes | | 59 | 1.32 |
| Total votes | | 4,475 | 100.00 |
| Registered voters/turnout | | 9,129 | 49.02 |
Italians
| Furio Radin | Independent | 1,594 | 65.84 |
| Maurizio Zennaro | Independent | 676 | 27.92 |
| Daniela Dapas | Sustainable Development of Croatia | 151 | 6.24 |
| Total | | 2,421 | 100.00 |
| Valid votes | | 2,421 | 98.94 |
| Invalid/blank votes | | 26 | 1.06 |
| Total votes | | 2,447 | 100.00 |
| Registered voters/turnout | | 10,312 | 23.73 |
Serbs
| Milorad Pupovac | Independent Democratic Serb Party | 14,103 | 31.10 |
| Mile Horvat | Independent Democratic Serb Party | 10,997 | 24.25 |
| Mirko Rašković | Independent Democratic Serb Party | 10,103 | 22.28 |
| Srđan Milaković | Independent | 2,995 | 6.60 |
| Siniša Ljubojević | Independent | 2,690 | 5.93 |
| Jovan Ajduković | Our Party | 1,681 | 3.71 |
| Dušan Bjelajac | Serbian Justice Party | 852 | 1.88 |
| Dragan Todić | Our Party | 543 | 1.20 |
| Slavko Mirnić | Our Party | 541 | 1.19 |
| Nenad Vlahović | Serbian Justice Party | 471 | 1.04 |
| Dragoljub Petrović | Serbian Justice Party | 371 | 0.82 |
| Total | | 45,347 | 100.00 |
| Valid votes | | 18,578 | 97.90 |
| Invalid/blank votes | | 398 | 2.10 |
| Total votes | | 18,976 | 100.00 |
| Registered voters/turnout | | 129,683 | 14.63 |
Source: Izbori

=== Distribution of seats by electoral district ===
| Party / District | I | II | III | IV | V | VI | VII | VIII | IX | X | XI | XII |
|---|---|---|---|---|---|---|---|---|---|---|---|---|
| Patriotic Coalition | 4 | 6 | 4 | 6 | 8 | 5 | 5 | 3 | 8 | 7 | 3 | — |
| Croatia is Growing | 7 | 5 | 8 | 5 | 4 | 6 | 6 | 7 | 4 | 4 | — | — |
| Most | 3 | 2 | 1 | 1 | 2 | 2 | 2 | 1 | 2 | 3 | 0 | — |
| IDS+PGS+RI | — | — | — | — | — | — | — | 3 | — | — | — | — |
| Bandić 365 | 0 | 1 | 0 | 0 | 0 | 1 | 0 | 0 | 0 | 0 | 0 | — |
| HDSSB | — | — | — | 2 | 0 | — | — | — | — | — | — | — |
| Human Shield | 0 | 0 | 0 | 0 | 0 | 0 | 1 | 0 | 0 | 0 | — | — |
| Successful Croatia | 0 | 0 | 1 | 0 | 0 | 0 | 0 | 0 | 0 | 0 | 0 | — |
| Ethnic minorities | — | — | — | — | — | — | — | — | — | — | — | 8 |

== Government formation ==
According to official results the ruling Croatia is Growing coalition won 56 seats, amounting to 59 due to the coalition with IDS. The opposition Patriotic Coalition and MOST (Croatian for bridge) were the second and third largest blocs, respectively. MOST has stated that it will not enter into coalition with either of the two largest blocs and that it will instead present its own candidate for prime minister. On 12 November, MOST MP Drago Prgomet was expelled from the party for holding private talks with Prime Minister Zoran Milanović without the knowledge of other members of the party's leadership.

There are four possible outcomes: HDZ forms a coalition with MOST, SDP forms a coalition with MOST, forming of a coalition between HDZ and SDP, and called a new election. Jutarnji reported that Milanović is closer to gaining the 76 seats needed for a majority in parliament than Tomislav Karamarko, the former having reportedly gained the support of IDS and the eight MPs elected by national minorities. It was also reported that Milan Bandić, whose party won two seats, as well as Radimir Čačić of Forward Croatia! - Progressive Alliance are also more likely to support Milanović. The regional party HDSSB is considered very unlikely to support a Patriotic Coalition government due to animosity on the local level (although they are ideologically closer), but they might support Croatia is Growing in a minority government. The first round of talks on the formation of the next government, held on 26 November at the Presidential palace proved inconclusive, with none of the leaders of parliamentary parties presenting the required 76 MPs needed for the naming of a Prime Minister-designate. President Kolinda Grabar-Kitarović called the first session of the eighth assembly of parliament for 3 December and set the date for new talks on 7 December. On 27 November, Milanović offered the position of Speaker of Parliament to MOST chairman Božo Petrov, who declined stating that he was not interested in holding a position, but rather for reforms to be agreed upon first. On 23 December, the Patriotic Coalition, MOST, Milan Bandić 365 - The Party of Labour and Solidarity and two minority representatives (Ermina Lekaj-Prljaskaj and Mirko Rašković) agreed upon non-partisan candidate Tihomir Orešković as prime minister-designate. Orešković presented the 78 signatures of support to Grabar-Kitarović, upon which she gave him the task of forming a new government and called the second attempt at constituting the parliament for 28 December.Željko Reiner was elected Speaker on 28 December with 88 votes in favor, 62 abstentions and 1 against, thus constituting the 8th Assembly of Parliament 50 days after the elections were held. The confirmation of the cabinet to be led by Tihomir Orešković took place on 22 January 2016. After a 14-hour parliamentary debate the new government was supported by a majority of 83 out of 151 parliamentary representatives. Zoran Milanović handed over the office of Prime Minister to Tihomir Orešković at 23:55 pm on the same day. This ended a record-breaking 76 days of negotiations that began on 9 November 2015.
