= Green Alternative – Sustainable Development of Croatia =

Green Alternative - Sustainable Development of Croatia Zelena alternativa - Održivi razvoj Hrvatske
- Logo until 2020
- President: Zorislav Antun Petrović
- Founder: Mirela Holy
- Founded: 29 October 2013
- Headquarters: Zagreb, Croatia
- Membership (2021): 41
- Ideology: Green politics Progressivism; Pro-Europeanism
- Political position: Centre-left
- National affiliation: Green–Left Coalition (2017–2023)
- European affiliation: European Green Party (associate member)
- European Parliament group: Greens–European Free Alliance
- Colours: Olive green
- Croatian Parliament: 0 / 151
- European Parliament: 0 / 11
- Zagreb Assembly: 1 / 47

Website
- za-orah.hr

Green alternative - Sustainable Development of Croatia (Croatian: Zelena alternativa - Održivi razvoj Hrvatske) or ORaH (Orah meaning "walnut" in Croatian) is a minor green political party in Croatia.

== History ==
The party was formed in 2013. Its leader is a former Minister of Environmental Protection and Nature and Social Democratic Party MP Mirela Holy. She won the seat in the Sabor as a member of the Social Democratic Party which she left after some disagreements over party leadership.

In the May 2014, the party came close to 10% of the vote and elected one MEP, Davor Škrlec, who sits with the Greens in the European Parliament. Later that year, the minor green party Green List merged into ORaH.

On 23 July 2015 it was announced that an independent MP Mladen Novak was joining ORaH. He was a former Croatian Labourists – Labour Party member who left the party after it started negotiating to join Kukuriku coalition. Another former labourist MP, Zlatko Tušak, joined the party on 18 September 2015, giving ORaH a third MP ahead of the elections.

In the 2015 Croatian parliamentary election, ORaH fared worse than any opinion poll had predicted, gaining less than 2% of the vote, and no MP. It is the largest party outside of the Croatian Parliament.

In February 2016, Mirela Holy left the party "because of personal and professional reasons", stating that she wanted to have more time for lecturing on Vern Polytechnic, writing books and fashion design. In April 2016, Davor Škrlec left the party because of his dissatisfaction over how the party is run, and the party's passivity towards the problems of Croatian society.

At the assembly held on Sunday, November 15 2020, the members of ORaH made a decision to supplement the name of the party, which is now called the Green Alternative - Sustainable Development of Croatia. The desire was in this way to further highlight their green party orientation.

== Election results ==
=== Croatian Parliament ===
Year	Popular vote (coalition)	% of popular vote	Overall seats won	Change	Coalition	Government
2015	38.830	1.74%	0 / 151	Steady	—	Extra-parliamentary
2016	14,788	0.78%	0 / 151	Steady	No Selling	Extra-parliamentary
2020	116,480	6.99%	0 / 151	Steady	Green–Left	Extra-parliamentary

=== Presidential elections ===
Election	Candidate	Party	1st round			2nd round			Result
Election	Candidate	Party	Rank	# of overall vote	% of overall vote	Rank	# of overall vote	% of overall vote	Result
2014–15	Ivo Josipović	SDP	#1	687,678	38.46	#2	1,082,436	49.26	Lost
2019–20	Zoran Milanović	SDP	#1	562,783	29.55	#1	1,034,170	52.66	Won
2024–25	Zoran Milanović	Independent (Note: Milanović was elected in the 2019–20 election as the candidate of the SDP. However, under Article 96 of the Constitution of Croatia, sitting presidents are prohibited from holding party memberships for the duration of their term. As a result, he will stand as an independent candidate, with informal SDP affiliation.)	#1	797,938	49.09	#1	1,122,859	74.68	Won

=== European Parliament ===
Election	List leader	Coalition	Votes	%	Seats	+/–	EP Group
Election	List leader	Coalition	Coalition		ORaH		EP Group
2014	Mirela Holy	None	86,806	9.42 (#3)	1 / 11	New	Greens/EFA
2019	Tomislav Tomašević	Green–Left	19,313	1.79 (#12)	0 / 12	▼1	–
2024	Zorislav Antun Petrović	None	1,636	0.22 (#15)	0 / 12	0	–
