= Vladimir Štengl =

Croatian politician

Vladimir Štengl (born July 30, 1942 in Vukovar) is a Croatian politician.

From 1997 to 2001 he was mayor of Vukovar. He also served as president of the government of the city of Vukovar. He is a member of the Croatian Democratic Union party.

He became known for lengthy and controversial lawsuit against Vukovarac.net internet portal.
