= Democratic Party of Zagorje =

Political party in Croatia

Democratic Party of Zagorje (Croatian: Zagorska demokratska stranka or ZDS) is a right-wing political party from Krapina-Zagorje and Varaždin counties in Croatia. It was established on 5 February 1997 in Oroslavje.

== Election results ==
At the 2003 parliamentary elections, an alliance of the Croatian Party of Rights (Hrvatska stranka prava, HSP), the Međimurje Party (Međimurska stranka) and the Zagorje Democratic Party won 6.4% of votes and 8 out of 151 seats. The seats were all allocated to HSP.

At the last local elections in Croatia in 2005, an alliance of the ZDS and HSLS won 10% of votes in Krapina-Zagorje County and 5 seats out of 51 in Regional Parliament. An alliance of the ZDS and its partners won elections in the towns of Klanjec and Donja Stubica and municipalities of Desinić, Budinščina, Krapinske Toplice and Tuhelj.

A regional party from Zagorje County (north of Zagreb) and Varaždin County. This party has not a single representative in the Parliament, but the State Election Committee and the Parliamentary Constitutional Committee decided that it is to be counted as a parliamentary party. Namely, the party run for election in 2004 in joint list with the HSP and they together won one seat that was occupied by a non-party representative.

President elected on general assembly in 2006 was doctor Stanko Belina from Zabok, Croatia. Elected vice presidents were: doctor Višeslav Ćuk, Dragutin Burek, Darko Potočki, Dragutin Babić and Željko Belina. Secretary General of the Party was Zvonko Županić. On the last local elections ZDS won five seats in Regional Parliament together with HSLS (coalition ZDS-HSLS). Policy of ZDS is promotion of ecology - primary anti-GMO actions, protection of water supplies in Zagorje and Northwestern Croatia as well as protection of general interests of Zagorje and Varaždin County citizens.

In 2016, ZDS changed its name to Croatian Kajkavian Party (Croatian: Hrvatska kajkavska stranka), looking to expand its influence into 11 Croatian counties where Kajkavian is spoken, but reverted to its original name a year later.

Members: 1998 (5,250), 1999 (5,250), 2002 (5,500).

== Electoral history ==
=== Legislative ===
Election	In coalition with	Votes won (coalition totals)	Percentage	Seats won	Change
2000	DPS	7,250	0.25%	0 / 151	Steady
2003	HSP-MS	158,073	6.4%	0 / 151	Steady
2007	HSS-HSLS-PGS-ZS	161,814	6.5%	0 / 151	Steady
2011	HSLS	71,077	3.0%	0 / 151	Steady
2015	Patriotic Coalition	746,626	33.36%	0 / 151	Steady
