= Successful Croatia =

Successful Croatia Uspješna Hrvatska
- Leader: Radimir Čačić; Ivo Josipović
- Founded: 18 August 2015
- Dissolved: 2016
- Headquarters: Zagreb, Croatia
- Political position: Centre to Centre-left
- Colours: Purple, Red
- Sabor: 1 / 151
- European Parliament: 0 / 11

Website
- reformisti.hr naprijedhrvatska.hr

Successful Croatia (Croatian: Uspješna Hrvatska) was a political alliance in Croatia formed in 2015 by People's Party - Reformists and Forward Croatia-Progressive Alliance. The parties signed the coalition agreement on 18 August 2015.

== Members ==
Logo	Party name	Leader	Ideology	Seats in the Parliament
	People's Party - Reformists	Radimir Čačić	Social liberalism	1 / 151
	Forward Croatia-Progressive Alliance	Ivo Josipović	Social democracy	0 / 151

== See also ==
- 2015 Croatian parliamentary election
