= Tomislav Karamarko =

Croatian politician

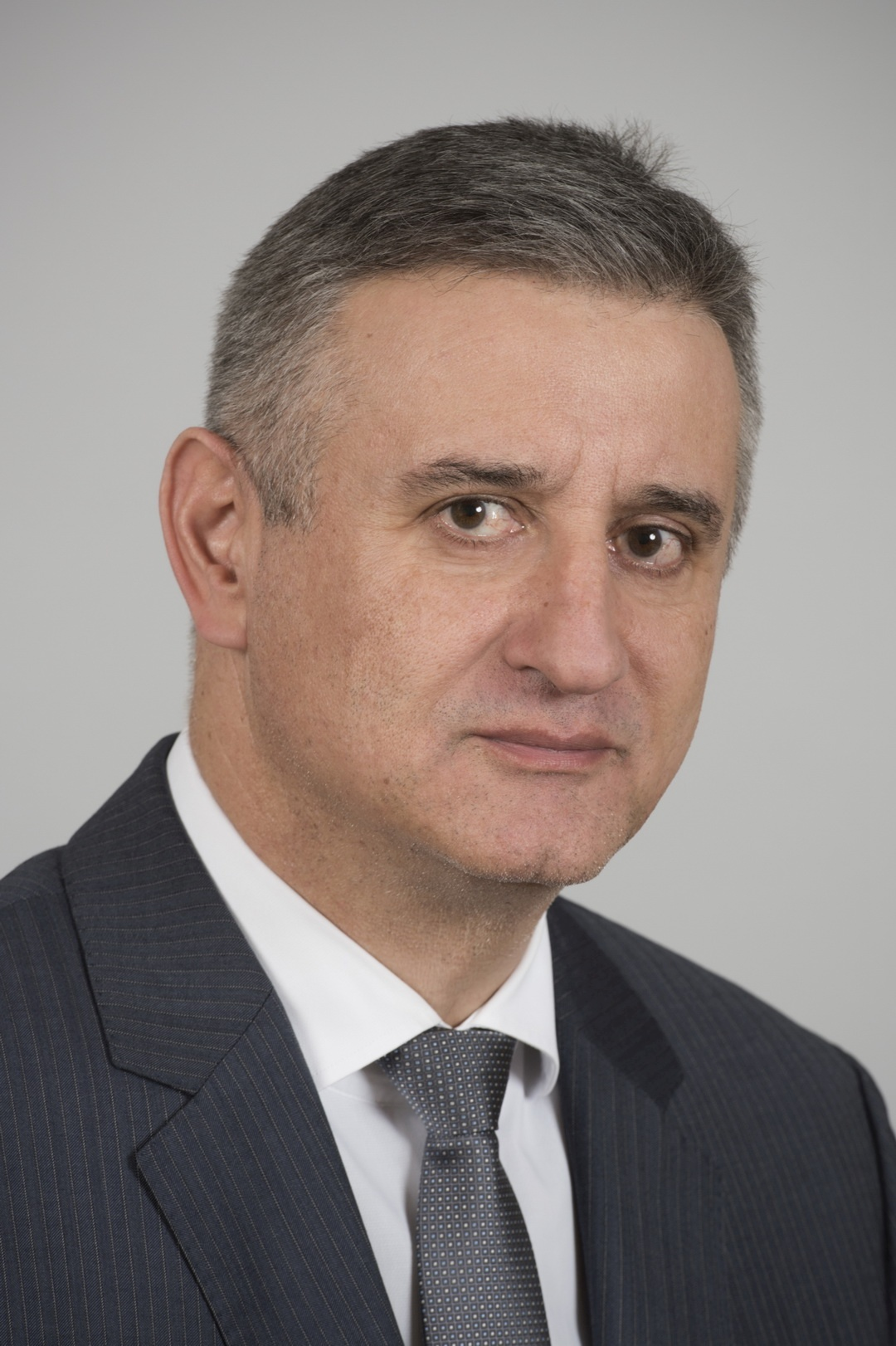
- Official portrait, 2016

First Deputy Prime Minister of Croatia
- In office 22 January 2016 – 15 June 2016
- Prime Minister: Tihomir Orešković
- Preceded by: Vesna Pusić
- Succeeded by: Ivan Kovačić; Davor Ivo Stier; Damir Krstičević; Martina Dalić

Leader of the Opposition
- In office 21 May 2012 – 22 January 2016
- Prime Minister: Zoran Milanović
- Preceded by: Jadranka Kosor
- Succeeded by: Zoran Milanović

Member of the Croatian Parliament for the 3rd electoral district
- In office 22 December 2011 – 22 January 2016

Minister of the Interior
- In office 10 October 2008 – 23 December 2011
- Prime Minister: Ivo Sanader; Jadranka Kosor
- Preceded by: Berislav Rončević
- Succeeded by: Ranko Ostojić

President of the Croatian Democratic Union
- In office 21 May 2012 – 21 June 2016
- Deputy: Drago Prgomet; Milijan Brkić
- Preceded by: Jadranka Kosor
- Succeeded by: Andrej Plenković

Personal details
- Born: 25 May 1959 (age 67) Zadar, PR Croatia, FPR Yugoslavia (modern Croatia)
- Party: Croatian Democratic Union (1989–present)
- Spouse(s): Enisa Muftić (m. 1993–2011) Ana Šarić (m. 2015)
- Children: 3
- Education: University of Zagreb

Tomislav Karamarko (pronounced [tǒmislaʋ karamǎːrko]; born 25 May 1959) is a Croatian politician who served as First Deputy Prime Minister of Croatia from January to June 2016. He served in the Cabinet of Jadranka Kosor as Minister of the Interior from 2008 to 2011.

== Early life ==
Karamarko was born in Zadar, People's Republic of Croatia, Yugoslavia, in a Croatian family. His father was one of the survivors of the Bleiburg repatriations. He attended elementary school at Kruševo near Obrovac, then moved with his family to Zagreb where he finished high school.

During his education in high school, Karamarko played guitar and performed in Students' Home, where other popular bands also held concerts, among which Azra, Film, Idoli and others. As a youngster, Karamarko played basketball, and he almost started to join some basketball clubs; however, he chose education instead of sports.

In 1979 he enrolled at the University of Zagreb's Faculty of Law, but later dropped out and eventually switched to studying history at the Faculty of Humanities and Social Sciences in 1982, before graduating in 1985.

According to Josip Manolić, to whom he was a chief of cabinet when Manolić become the Prime Minister, Karamarko worked for the State Security Administration (UDBA), the secret police of Yugoslavia. Manolić said that Karamarko worked for UDBA because he was blackmailed for involvement in petty criminal activities. Karamarko sued Manolić for libel regarding Manolić's interview to Nacional, but Manolić was acquitted in 2018 after testimonies by, among others, Krunislav Olujić, who confirmed that President Franjo Tuđman indicated that Vladimir Šeks and Karamarko worked for the secret police before democratization.

During his university days Karamarko was known as a shy student who only mingled with students hailing from Dalmatia or Herzegovina. As a twenty-year-old, Karamarko joined the Croatian Catholic Assembly Mi (We). In 1982, Karamarko visited Vatican City with a group of his friends where they waved the Croatian flag. As a result, he was reportedly deprived of a passport by Yugoslavia's authorities. A journalist, Željko Peratović, later disputed that Karamarko was a Catholic dissident, claiming that UDBA had helped him obtain a job in the Croatian State Archives and finish his studies. In the 1980s Karamarko met his future wife, Enisa Muftić, daughter of Osman Muftić, who later briefly served as minister of science in the Cabinet of Stjepan Mesić in 1990.

== Career ==
Karamarko was one of the founders of the Croatian Democratic Union in 1989 and in June 1991 he was named Chief of Cabinet of Josip Manolić, Prime Minister of Croatia. He continued to serve as Chief of Cabinet for Manolić's successor, Franjo Gregurić until September 1992 when he became Chief of Cabinet of the Speaker of the Croatian Parliament, Stjepan Mesić. A year later he became Director of the Zagreb Police Administration and in 1996 he was named Assistant Interior Minister. In 1998 he also became secretary of the Croatian Automobile Club.

During the 2000 presidential election he headed Stjepan Mesić's election campaign. Mesić won the election and later named Karamarko as his national security advisor and head of the National Security Office. In 2002 Karamarko was appointed director of the Counterintelligence Agency (POA) and in 2006 he was named director of the Security and Intelligence Agency (SOA).

In October 2008 Prime Minister Ivo Sanader named him Minister of the Interior and he remained in that post until December 2011 when HDZ was defeated in the 2011 general election. He acted as an independent minister until September 2011, when he joined HDZ for the second time. In May 2012 he won the party election and became the fourth president of HDZ, succeeding former Prime Minister Jadranka Kosor.

== Political career ==
He was assigned by Ivan Bobetko to unload the party's official newspaper Glasnik HDZ-a from a truck with his friends. Before Franjo Tuđman was elected president, Karamarko supported presidency of Marko Veselica or Vlado Veselica. Soon, Karamarko met an influential HDZ member, Vice Vukojević who involved him in organization of the first HDZ's assembly. Karamarko's connections with HDZ helped him re-establish contact with people from his hometown, where he brought arms bought by Croatian expatriates. In 1991, after a shorter fight with the Army of Serb Krajina, Karamarko prepared housing for Croatian refugees, which increased his reputation among people from the Zadar area.

On the recommendation of Vukojević, who was at the time the assistant to Interior Minister and Josip Perković, assistant Defence Minister, on 17 June 1991, Karamarko was named chief of cabinet of Prime Minister Josip Manolić. Karamarko became friends with Stjepan Mesić. Manolić's successor, Franjo Gregurić, left Karamarko as his chief of cabinet.

On 10 September 1992, when the Second Assembly of the Croatian Parliament was formed, Mesić, at the time Speaker of Parliament, named him chief of his cabinet. Karamarko remained Mesić's cabinet chief until 15 June 1993, when he was named chief of police in Zagreb. That year, he married Enisa Muftić.

From 1993 until 1996, Karamarko served as director of Zagreb Police Administration, and from 1996 to 1998 served as Assistant Minister of Internal Affairs. After he ended his career as assistant minister, he became secretary of the Croatian Automobile Club.

During the 2000 presidential election Karamarko was chief of Mesić's election campaign. Mesić, at the time member of the Croatian People's Party, won the election with 56% of votes in the second round against Dražen Budiša of the Croatian Social Liberal Party. After Mesić had won the election, Karamarko was named as his advisor for national security.

He also served as the head of National Security Office (UNS) from 2000 to 2002, as the head of Counterintelligence Agency (POA) from 2004 to 2006, and as head of the Security and Intelligence Agency (SOA) from 2006 to 2008.

== President of Croatian Democratic Union ==
In May 2012, Karamarko was elected president of the Croatian Democratic Union, the main center-right political party in Croatia. Before the 2015 parliamentary election, Karamarko radicalised his party's politics and eventually became one of the most unpopular politicians in the country. His Patriotic Coalition won 59 seats, 17 short of a majority, which forced him to enter a coalition with the Bridge of Independent Lists, a new political party. The Bridge won 19 seats and thus became "a kingmaker" for forming the next government, having to decide between a conservative or a social democratic one. After the negotiations between HDZ and The Bridge, on 22 January 2016, both parties agreed to elect non-partisan Tihomir Orešković as new Prime Minister of Croatia, while Karamarko became First Deputy Prime Minister.

=== Motion of no confidence and government crisis ===
On 18 May 2016, Social Democratic Party (SDP) begun a motion of no confidence against Karamarko, after Nacional published secret contracts on business cooperation of his wife Ana Šarić and Josip Petrović, special adviser and lobbyist of the MOL Group, a Hungarian oil corporation that gained control of Croatia's national oil company INA through a corruption scandal involving former Prime Minister Ivo Sanader. According to contracts, Šarić, a marketing expert, advised Petrović on the energy business and was paid for that at least €60,000. Contracts are controversial since Croatia and MOL are currently in the arbitration proceeding which was started by MOL for Croatia's alleged violation of certain obligations and procedures in connection with MOL's investment in Croatia. In addition, contracts were examined by the Committee on Conflict of Interest which determined that Karamarko was indeed in conflict of interest when he publicly shared his views and suggested that Croatia should pull out of the arbitration proceedings. The vote was supposed to take place by 18 June 2016, and it had the support from 80 MPs, including those of his coalition partners Most, with 76 needed. On 15 June 2016, Karamarko resigned as First Deputy Prime Minister.

After Karamarko's resignation, HDZ decided to run a revenge motion of no confidence against Prime Minister Orešković The vote took place on 16 June and was successful with 125 MPs in favor, 15 against and 2 abstentions, which caused the government to collapse. HDZ then tried to form a new majority in the parliament with no success, despite party members claiming that they have the support of sufficient number MPs. Croatian President Kolinda Grabar-Kitarović therefore decided to schedule a new parliamentary election for September. As a consequence of failing to form a new majority in the parliament, Karamarko decided to resign from his position of president of Croatian Democratic Union on 21 June. One month later, Andrej Plenković was elected as Karamarko's successor, who would go on to become Prime Minister after the 2016 parliamentary election.

=== Post-resignation ===
After resignation, Karamarko spent some time traveling around the world and in May 2017, he announced that he decided to establish a think-tank organisation - Institute for Security and Prosperity of Croatia. The move which was later mocked by some of his former party members.

== Political stances ==
In May 2015, Karamarko gave the interview to Globus, after which Croatian media dubbed his new program "The Anti-communist Manifesto". In the program, he advocated for "comprehensive change of general public climate, complete system of values, nullification of communist indoctrination and abolishment of wrong and degenerate interpretation of contemporary history". He criticized his main rivals the Social Democratic Party, claiming that: "they, as a successor of League of Communists of Croatia, never renounced nor condemned its own totalitarianism." and urged them to: "renounce Josip Broz Tito, totalitarianism and to condemn Tito's crimes."

In January 2018, while commenting recent political events in Croatia on Facebook, Karamarko wrote that his "political thought is very close to that of Viktor Orban's Christmas message".

Political offices
Preceded by Berislav Rončević	Minister of Interior; 2008–2012	Succeeded by Ranko Ostojić
Preceded by Jadranka Kosor	Leader of the Opposition; 2012–2016	Succeeded by Zoran Milanović
Preceded by Vesna Pusić	First Deputy Prime Minister of Croatia; 2016	Succeeded by Davor Ivo Stier
Party political offices
Preceded by Jadranka Kosor	President of the Croatian Democratic Union; 2012–2016	Succeeded by Andrej Plenković
