= Dragan Vulin =

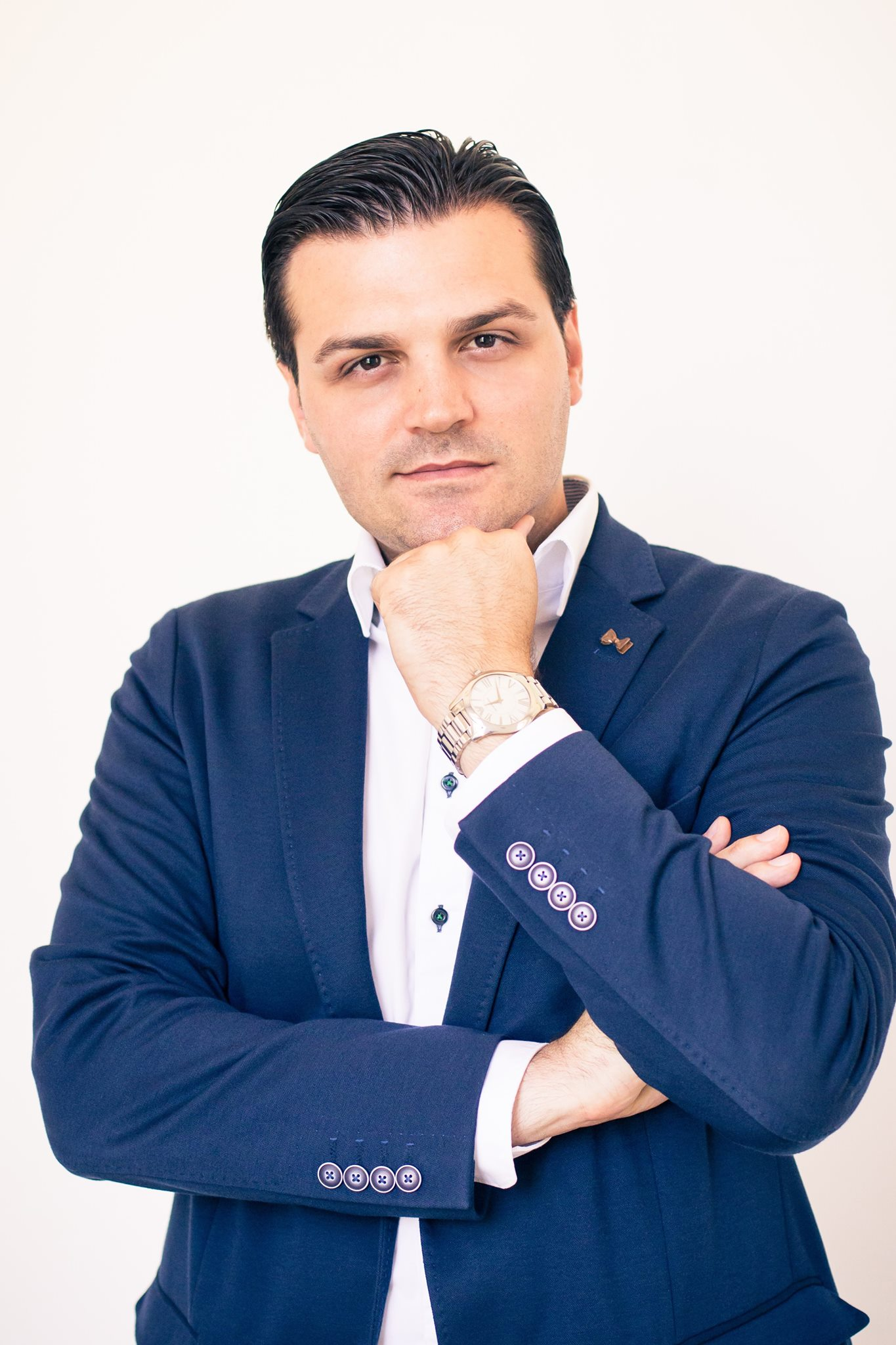
Dragan Vulin

Dragan Vulin (born 1 May 1986) is a Croatian politician and scientist.

== Early life and education ==
Vulin was born in Osijek in 1986. He graduated from secondary school in 2005. He studied electrical engineering at the Faculty of Electrical Engineering, Computer Science and Information Technology Osijek (FERIT). He obtained his first (BEng) degree in 2008, and second (MEng) degree in 2010. He received a PhD degree in electrical engineering from the Josip Juraj Strossmayer University of Osijek, Faculty of Electrical Engineering, Computer Science and Information Technology Osijek (FERIT) in 2020.

During his studies, he won the University of Osijek Rector's Award as well as the Croatian Energy Association „Hrvoje Pozar“ award.

== Career ==
Vulin was employed at the Faculty of Electrical Engineering, Computer Science and Information Technology Osijek (FERIT) as a research assistant from 2010 to 2020 and now he is employed as a postdoctoral researcher. He authored several scientific papers in the field of electromagnetism, circuit theory, renewable energy sources, and power electronics.

He served as a deputy prefect of Osijek-Baranja County from 2013 to 2017 and as a president of the County Assembly of Osijek-Baranja County and as a member of the City Council of Osijek from 2017 to 2021. In 2021, he was elected as a deputy mayor of City of Osijek. He is a member of political party Hrvatska demokratska zajednica (HDZ).

He was an International Visitor Leadership Program (IVLP) participant on the project: "Current US Social, Political and Economic Issues for Young European Leaders" in 2019.
