= Croatian Growth =

Political party in Croatia

Croatian Growth Hrast-Movement for Successful Croatia
- President: Ladislav Ilčić
- Founded: 23 November 2012
- Dissolved: 2 October 2021
- Merged into: Croatian Souverainists
- Headquarters: Zagreb, Croatia
- Ideology: Christian right National conservatism Social conservatism Political Catholicism
- Political position: Right-wing
- National affiliation: Croatian Sovereignists (2019–)
- European affiliation: European Christian Political Movement
- Colours: Light blue
- Sabor: 0 / 151
- European Parliament: 0 / 12

Website
- h-rast.hr

Croatian Growth (Croatian: Hrvatski rast, acronym Hrast is a Croatian word for Oak tree) or Hrast-Movement for Successful Croatia was a political party in Croatia established in 2012. Its founding was initiated by several conservative Catholic NGOs, Croatian section of Radio Maria, Croatian Republican Union, Family Party, Christian Democrat politician Ante Ledić, author Hrvoje Hitrec and two candidates in 2010 Presidential elections in Croatia, historian Josip Jurčević and Miroslav Tuđman, son of first Croatian president Franjo Tuđman. The party was a member of the European Christian Political Movement.

In the 2013 European Parliament election, Croatian Growth received 2,55% of votes, which was not enough to gain a seat.

The party participated in the Patriotic Coalition at the 2015 Croatian parliamentary election. In that election, it became possible for candidates to receive preferential votes, and the candidates of Hrast won a total of 8,800 (out of a coalition total of 771,070).

Ladislav Ilčić served as MP until new 2016 Croatian parliamentary election, when he was replaced by Hrvoje Zekanović, party's vicepresident.

Since April 2018, HRAST is no longer part of the ruling HDZ coalition because of disagreement over the ratification of the Istanbul Convention.

In July 2018, HRAST signed a political cooperation pact with Croatian Conservative Party. In February 2019, they launched political platform called Croatian Sovereignists together with several NGOs and prominent intellectuals for the upcoming 2019 European Parliament election.

On October 2, 2021, a unification assembly was held in Croatia's capital Zagreb. During the assembly, it was announced that three smaller conservative and right-wing parties (Croatian Conservative Party, Croatian Growth - Movement for Successful Croatia and the Generation of Renewal) will become defunct to merge and work together as the Croatian Sovereignists.

== Election results ==
=== Legislative ===
Election	In coalition with	Popular vote (coalition totals)	% of overall vote	Seats won	Change	Government
2015	Patriotic Coalition	746,626	33.36% (#1)	1 / 151	New	Government
2016	HDZ-HSLS-HDS	682,687	36.27% (#1)	1 / 151	0	Government 2016–2018
2016	HDZ-HSLS-HDS	682,687	36.27% (#1)	1 / 151	0	Opposition 2018–2020
2020	DPMŠ	181,492	10.89% (#3)	1 / 151	0	Opposition

=== European Parliament ===
Election year	In coalition with	# of total votes	% of overall vote	# of seats won
2019	HKS–HSP AS–UHD	91,546	8.52% (#3)	1 / 12
