= Croatian Party of Rights — Dr. Ante Starčević =

Croatian Party of Rights — Dr. Ante Starčević Hrvatska stranka prava - dr. Ante Starčević
- President: Slobodan Dević
- Secretary: Božidar Lokin
- Founded: 2009
- Split from: Croatian Party of Rights
- Headquarters: Zadar
- Membership (2013): 19,174
- Ideology: Croatian nationalism; Social conservatism
- Political position: Far-right
- National affiliation: Croatian Souverainists (2019–2020)
- European affiliation: Alliance of European Conservatives and Reformists
- European Parliament group: European Conservatives and Reformists
- Colours: Blue, Grey
- Sabor: 0 / 151
- European Parliament: 0 / 12

Website
- hsp-ante-starcevic.hr

Croatian Party of Rights Dr. Ante Starčević (Croatian: Hrvatska stranka prava dr. Ante Starčević or HSP AS) is a nationalist political party in Croatia.

It was founded in 2009 by Ruža Tomašić and others as a splinter party from the Croatian Party of Rights. It is named after Ante Starčević (1823–1896). In 2011, they reported a membership of 20,000. They had limited electoral success in local elections, such as winning three seats in Vukovar city council in 2011.

In 2011, Croatian Party of Rights-Dr. Ante Starčević signed a pre-election coalition agreement with far right Croatian Pure Party of Rights. In the 2011 Croatian parliamentary election, their coalition won one parliamentary seat.

In late 2012, the party made a permanent coalition with the centre-right Croatian Democratic Union. This coalition won the Croatian European Parliament election in 2013 and party president Ruža Tomašić was the highest ranking candidate on the winning list by preferential vote. The party joined the European Conservatives and Reformists.

On 3 November 2014, the party's founder and first president, Ruža Tomašić, left the party.

The party was temporarily dissolved in 2020 due to financial struggles but was once again labeled as "Active" by the Register of political parties after participating in the 2025 Croatian local elections.

== Election results ==
=== Legislative ===
The following is a summary of the party's results in legislative elections for the Croatian Parliament. The "Total votes" and "Percentage" columns include sums of votes won by pre-election coalitions HSP AS had been part of. After preferential votes were introduced into the electoral system, the total votes column also includes the statistic of the sum of votes given to HSS candidates on the coalition lists. The "Total seats" column includes sums of seats won by HSP AS in election constituencies plus representatives of ethnic minorities affiliated with HSP AS.

Election	In coalition with	Votes won	Percentage	Seats won	Change
Election	In coalition with	(Coalition totals)		(HSP AS only)	
2011	Croatian Pure Party of Rights	66,150	2,8	1 / 151	New
2015	Patriotic Coalition	744,507 (11,200)	33.46	3 / 151	▲2
2016	Desno, HKDU, USP, HDS	11,100	0.59	0 / 151	▼3

=== European parliament ===
Election	In coalition with	Votes won (Coalition totals)	Percentage	Total seats won (HSP AS only)	Change
April 2013	Croatian Democratic Union, Bloc of United Pensioners	243,654	32,86%	1 / 12	▲1
May 2014	Croatian Democratic Union, Croatian Peasant Party, Bloc of United Pensioners	381,844	41.42%	1 / 11	Steady
May 2019	Croatian Sovereignists (Croatian Growth, Croatian Conservative Party, United Croatian Patriots)	91,546	8,52%	0 / 12	▼1
