= The Bridge (Croatia) =

Croatian political party

The Bridge Most
- President: Nikola Grmoja
- Founder: Božo Petrov
- Founded: 17 November 2012
- Headquarters: Zagreb
- Membership (2021): 775
- Ideology: National conservatism; Right-wing populism; Economic liberalism; Social conservatism; Soft Euroscepticism
- Political position: Right-wing
- European affiliation: European Conservatives and Reformists Party
- Colours: Orange; Blue
- Sabor: 7 / 151
- European Parliament: 0 / 12
- County Prefects: 0 / 21
- Mayors: 1 / 128

Website
- most-hrvatska.hr
- Politics of Croatia; Political parties; Elections; A: Although beginning as a big tent party, and later a centre-right one, it has recently shifted to the right.

The Bridge (Croatian: Most), previously known as Bridge of Independent Lists (Croatian: Most nezavisnih lista) until November 2020, is a political party in Croatia founded in 2012 by Božo Petrov, former mayor of Metković, deputy prime minister and speaker of the Croatian Parliament. It is now led by Nikola Grmoja since November 2025. Although the party leaders initially avoided ideological topics, The Bridge underwent a rebranding prior to the 2020 Croatian parliamentary election, establishing itself as a social conservative and soft Eurosceptic party.

== History ==
=== Origins ===
Former logo

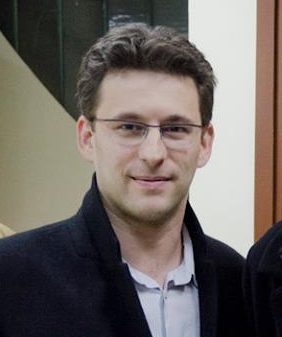
Božo Petrov, founder of Most and former deputy prime minister and speaker of the Croatian Parliament.

The Bridge of Independent Lists (Most) was founded in Metković on 17 November 2012 as a regionalist political platform. Božo Petrov was chosen as the first party president.

In 2013, the Bridge of Independent Lists participated in the local elections in the town of Metković. The party won 46.25% of the votes, and 9 out of 17 seats in the City Council. Petrov won 45.78% of the votes and entered the second round of elections for the mayor against Stipe Gabrić Jambo, incumbent mayor since 1997. In the second round Petrov won with 67.94% of the votes and became the Mayor of Metković. At the same election, Most won 9.97% of the votes in county elections and entered the County Assembly of the Dubrovnik-Neretva County.

=== 2015 parliamentary election ===
For the 2015 parliamentary election, the party went national and was joined by independent local politicians from other parts of the country.

The party campaigned for fiscal responsibility, reduction of government spending and public debt, tax cuts, reforms in the public sector and the reduction of administrative divisions in Croatia. The party supported an expansionary monetary policy and monetary reforms that would include the Croatian National Bank introducing a low interest policy to foster economic growth.

The party won 19 seats in the Croatian Parliament and came third behind the ruling centre-left Croatia is Growing coalition, led by the Social Democratic Party (SDP), and the centre-right opposition Patriotic Coalition, led by the Croatian Democratic Union (HDZ). Four MPs left Most in the aftermath of the election. When the 8th Parliament assembly was formed, Most had 15 MPs.

=== Government of Tihomir Orešković ===
After more than 40 days of negotiations and numerous turnarounds, Most decided to form a government with the Patriotic Coalition, giving them a slim majority of 78 seats. They nominated the Croatian-Canadian businessman Tihomir Orešković to be the next Prime Minister of Croatia. The government cabinet was formed on 22 January 2016 and party president Božo Petrov was named deputy prime minister, together with HDZ's president Tomislav Karamarko. Along with Petrov, six ministers in the new government were proposed by Most: Interior, Justice, Administration, Economy, Agriculture and Environment.

The new government was marked by strained relations between Most and the Patriotic Coalition, particularly over the INA, Croatia's national oil company, and the Ministry of the Interior. Several legislative proposals by the party were rejected by HDZ, including an amendment for reducing benefits of MPs, and the adoption of a new waste management plan.

In May 2016, Most called for Karamarko's resignation over a conflict of interest, which the latter refused to do. After Orešković also requested his resignation, a vote of no confidence in the Prime Minister was initiated by HDZ. Three MPs of Most sided with HDZ and later formed their own party. 125 MPs voted in favour, 15 voted against, and 2 abstained. Both the HDZ and most of the opposition voted in favour, while Most voted against.

=== 2016 parliamentary election ===
Following the collapse of the Orešković government in June 2016, an attempt was made by the Croatian Democratic Union to assemble a parliamentary majority which would support a new government, to be headed by Finance Minister Zdravko Marić. This attempt failed, however, and the main opposition party in Parliament, the Social Democratic Party of Croatia, began to gather signatures for an early dissolution of parliament so elections could be held by the end of the year. Following consultations within Most, its members of Parliament agreed to sign the opposition's petition for an early dissolution, with the successful parliamentary vote on the issue taking place on 20 June 2016 and taking effect on 15 July 2016. President Kolinda Grabar-Kitarović set 11 September 2016 as the date for elections.

Most contested the early parliamentary election on its own and won 13 seats (with 9.91% of the vote), which was a decline of 6 seats compared to the previous parliamentary election (when Most won 19 seats with 13.17% of the vote). However if post-election changes in the MPs party membership are taken into account following the previous election, Most actually gained one seat more than it held on the day parliament was dissolved on 15 July 2016.

=== Government of Andrej Plenković ===
Following the announcement of parliamentary election results, Most chairman Božo Petrov declared that Most would be open to negotiations with either one of the larger parties (HDZ and SDP) if they accepted Most's seven conditions (a package of laws aimed at passing reforms in a series of fields).

== Election results ==
=== Legislative ===
The following is a summary of the party's results in legislative elections for the Croatian parliament.

Year	Votes won	Percentage	Total seats won	Change	Government
2015	303,564	13.17% (#3)	19 / 151	New	Government
2016	187,282	9.91% (#3)	13 / 151	▼6	Government 2016–2017
2016	187,282	9.91% (#3)	13 / 151	▼6	Opposition 2017–2020
2020	123,194	7.39% (#4)	8 / 151	▼5	Opposition
2024	169,988	8.02% (#4)	9 / 151	▲1	Opposition

=== Presidential ===
Election	Candidate	1st round		2nd round		Result
Election	Candidate	Votes	%	Votes	%	Result
2019–20	end. Miroslav Škoro (Ind.)	465,704	24.75 (#3)			Lost
2024–25	Miro Bulj	62,127	3.82 (#6)			Lost

=== European Parliament ===
Election	List leader	Coalition	Votes	%	Seats	+/–	EP Group
Election	List leader	Coalition	Coalition		Most		EP Group
2019	Božo Petrov	None	50,257	4.68 (#6)	0 / 12	New	–
2024	Božo Petrov	HS–HSP	30,155	4.01 (#6)	0 / 12	0	–

== See also ==
- List of political parties in Croatia
