= Patriotic Coalition (Croatia) =

Patriotic Coalition Domoljubna koalicija
- Founded: 21 September 2015
- Dissolved: 25 July 2016
- Headquarters: Zagreb, Croatia
- Political position: Centre-right to right-wing
- Colours: Blue

Website
- domoljubna.hr

The Patriotic Coalition (Croatian: Domoljubna koalicija) was a political alliance in Croatia formed in 2015. The parties signed the coalition agreement on 21 September 2015. On 2015 parliamentary election, coalition won a relative majority in 5 of the 10 constituencies in Croatia, and all 3 seats reserved for the Croatian diaspora, and thus received a total of 59 of the 151 parliamentary seats, with its main competitor center-left Croatia is Growing coalition also winning a relative majority in 5 of the 10 constituencies in Croatia, and 56 of the 151 parliamentary seats. After more than 40 days of negotiations with the Bridge of Independent Lists (MOST) and numerous twists and turns mainly due to MOST frequently changing terms, coalition achieved agreement with MOST and Milan Bandić 365 - The Party of Labour and Solidarity on forming new government with Prime Minister being independent Tihomir Orešković.

Presidents of several coalition party members stated in 2016 that communication among coalition members is bad, with some expressing dissatisfaction with Governments' announced reforms.

On June 16, 2016, Coalition supported Cabinet of Tihomir Orešković lost a motion of no confidence in the Croatian Parliament, which was followed by the Parliament's self-dissolution on June 20, 2016 which triggered early election that was held in September 2016.

On July 7, 2016, 1.500 members of the Croatian Party of Rights dr. Ante Starčević left the party because of their dissatisfaction of how the party was run, accusing it of "becoming a spokesman for HDZ". On the same day, Main Committee of the Croatian Peasant Party made a decision that they would leave the Coalition and join coalition led by center-left Social Democratic Party of Croatia.

On July 25, 2016, HDZ announced that it would leave the Coalition.

== Former members ==
The coalition consisted of ten parties:

Logo	Party name	Leader	Ideology	Seats in the Parliament (January 2016)
	Croatian Democratic Union	Andrej Plenković	Liberal conservatism	49 / 151
	Croatian Party of Rights dr. Ante Starčević	Hrvoje Niče	Nationalism	3 / 151
	Croatian Peasant Party	Krešo Beljak	Agrarianism	2 / 151
	Croatian Social Liberal Party	Darinko Kosor	National liberalism	2 / 151
	Croatian Growth	Ladislav Ilčić	Social conservatism	1 / 151
	Bloc Pensioners Together	Milivoj Špika	Rights of pensioners	1 / 151
	Croatian Christian Democratic Party	Goran Dodig	Christian democracy	1 / 151
	Democratic Party of Zagorje	Stanko Belina	Regionalism	0 / 151

== History ==
=== European parliament ===
Early versions of the coalition participated in a joint list for elections to the European Parliament in 2013 and 2014.

Election	In coalition with	Votes won	Percentage	Total seats won	Change
2013	Croatian Democratic Union, Croatian Party of Rights dr. Ante Starčević, Bloc of United Pensioners	243,654	32,86%	6 / 12	Steady
2014	Croatian Democratic Union, Croatian Party of Rights dr. Ante Starčević, Bloc of United Pensioners, Croatian Peasant Party, Croatian Christian Democratic Party, Democratic Party of Zagorje	381,844	41,42%	6 / 11	Steady

== See also ==
- 2015 Croatian parliamentary election
