= Politics of Croatia =

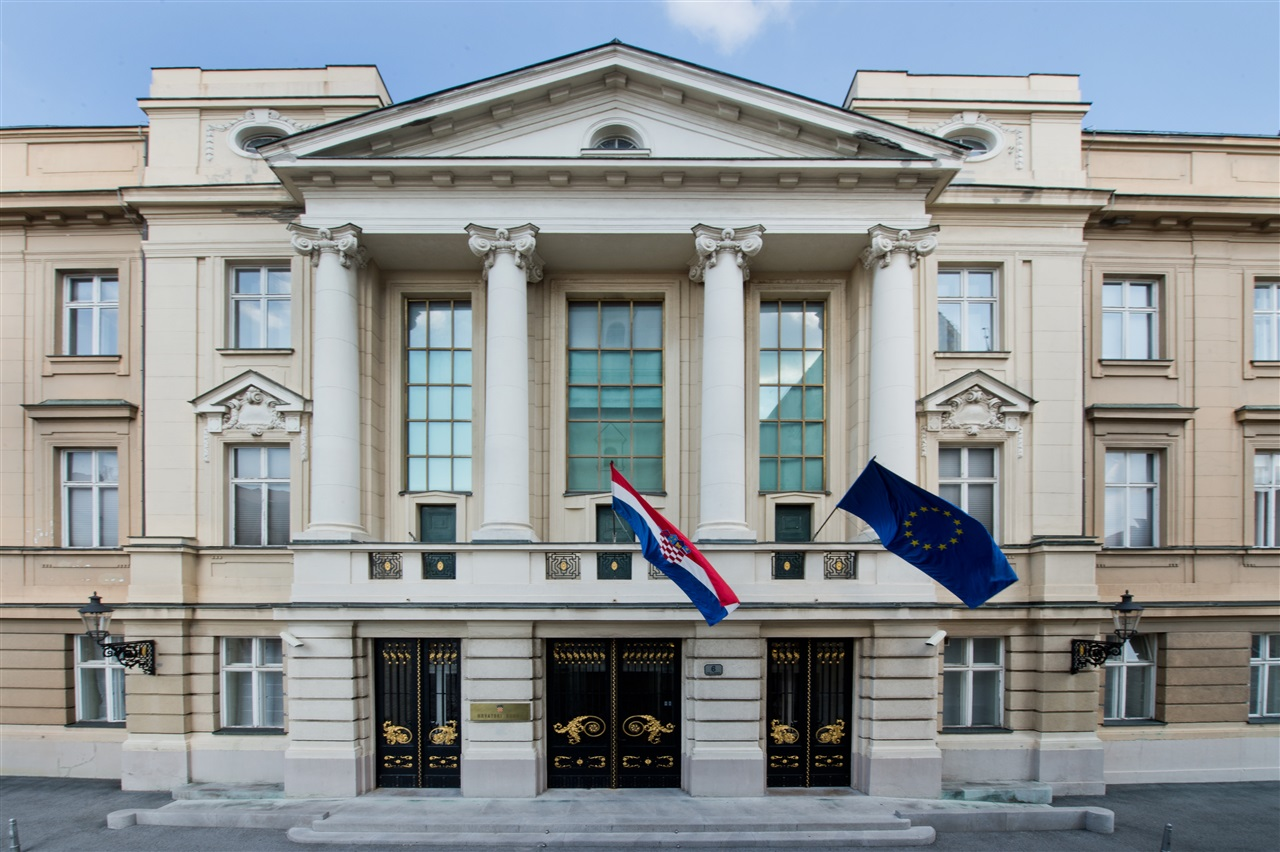
- Croatian Parliament's Sabor Palace
- Polity type: Parliamentary republic
- Constitution: Constitution of Croatia

Legislative branch
- Name: Parliament
- Type: Unicameral
- Meeting place: Sabor Palace
- Presiding officer: Gordan Jandroković, Speaker of the Croatian Parliament

Executive branch
- Head of state
- Currently: President of Croatia; Zoran Milanović
- Head of government
- Currently: Prime Minister; Andrej Plenković
- Cabinet
- Name: Cabinet of Croatia
- Leader: Prime Minister
- Appointer: Prime Minister
- Headquarters: Banski dvori

Judicial branch
- Name: Judiciary of Croatia
- Supreme Court of Croatia
- Chief judge: Mirta Matić

The politics of Croatia are defined by a parliamentary, representative democratic republic framework, where the Prime Minister of Croatia is the head of government in a multi-party system. Executive power is exercised by the Government and the President of Croatia. Legislative power is vested in the Croatian Parliament (Croatian: Sabor). The Judiciary is independent of the executive and the legislature. The parliament adopted the current Constitution of Croatia on 22 December 1990 and decided to declare independence from Yugoslavia on 25 June 1991. The Constitutional Decision on the Sovereignty and Independence of the Republic of Croatia came into effect on 8 October 1991. The constitution has since been amended several times. The first modern parties in the country developed in the middle of the 19th century, and their agenda and appeal changed, reflecting major social changes, such as the breakup of Austria-Hungary, the Kingdom of Serbs, Croats and Slovenes, dictatorship and social upheavals in the kingdom, World War II, the establishment of Communist rule and the breakup of the SFR Yugoslavia.

The President of the Republic (Croatian: Predsjednik/ica Republike) is the head of state and the commander in chief of the Croatian Armed Forces and is directly elected to serve a five-year term. The government (Croatian: Vlada), the main executive power of Croatia, is headed by the prime minister, who has four deputy prime ministers who serve also as government ministers. Twenty ministers are in charge of particular activities. The executive branch is responsible for proposing legislation and a budget, executing the laws, and guiding the foreign and internal policies. The Croatian Parliament is a unicameral legislative body. The number of Sabor representatives (MPs) ranges from 100 to 160; they are elected by popular vote to serve four-year terms. The powers of the legislature include enactment and amendment of the constitution and laws; adoption of the government budget, declarations of war and peace, defining national boundaries, calling referendums and elections, appointments and relief of officers, supervising the Government of Croatia and other holders of public powers responsible to the Sabor, and granting of amnesties. The Croatian constitution and legislation provides for regular presidential and parliamentary elections, and the election of county prefects (county presidents) and assemblies, and city and municipal mayors and councils.

Croatia has a three-tiered, independent judicial system governed by the Constitution of Croatia and national legislation enacted by the Sabor. The Supreme Court (Croatian: Vrhovni sud) is the highest court of appeal in Croatia, while municipal and county courts are courts of general jurisdiction. There are other specialised courts in Croatia, commercial courts and the High Commercial Court, misdemeanour courts and the High Misdemeanour Court, administrative courts and the High Administrative Court. Croatian Constitutional Court (Croatian: Ustavni sud) is a court that deals primarily with constitutional law. Its main authority is to rule on whether laws that are challenged are in fact unconstitutional, i.e., whether they conflict with constitutionally established rights and freedoms. The State Attorney's Office represents the state in legal proceedings.

== History ==
=== Within Austria-Hungary ===
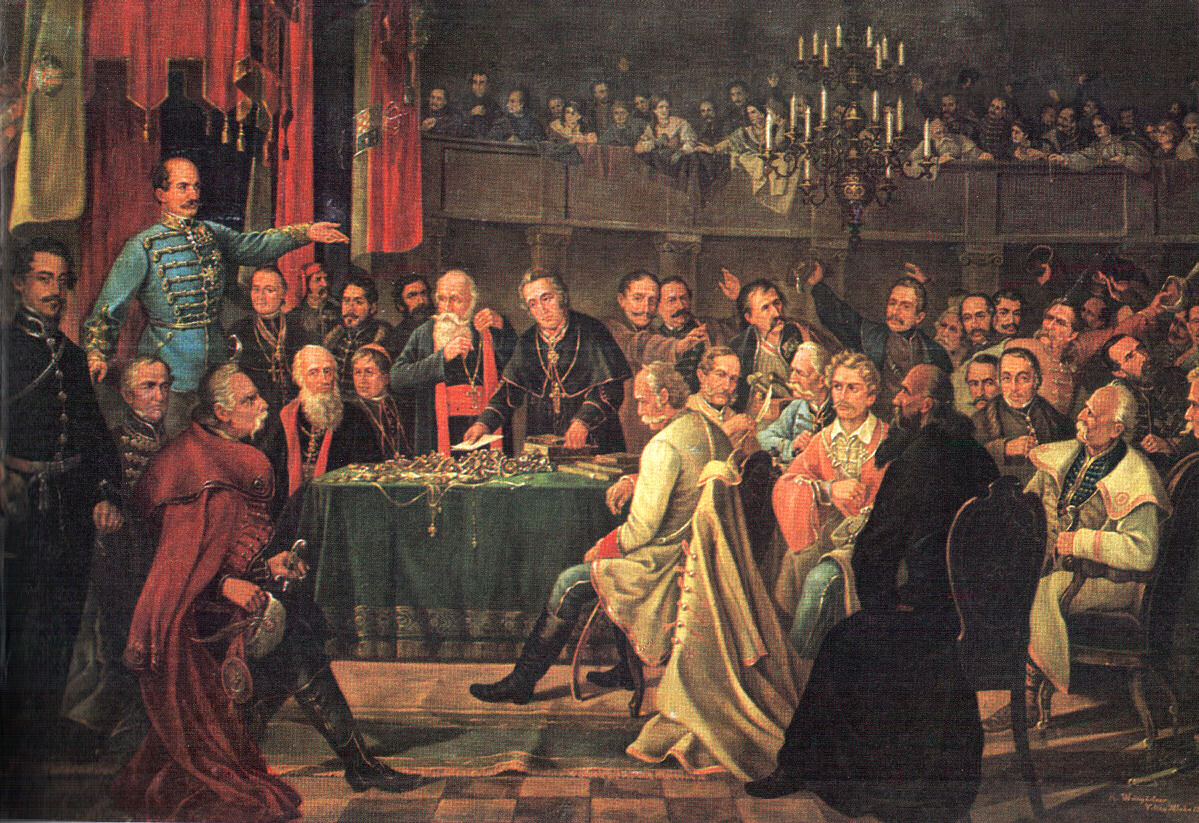
Meeting of the Sabor in 1848

Events of 1848 in Europe and the Austrian Empire brought dramatic changes to Croatian society and politics, provoking the Croatian national revival that strongly influenced and significantly shaped political and social events in Croatia. At the time, the Sabor and Ban Josip Jelačić advocated the severance of ties with the Kingdom of Hungary, emphasising links to other South Slavic lands within the empire. Several prominent Croatian political figures emerged, such as Ante Starčević, Eugen Kvaternik, Franjo Rački and Josip Juraj Strossmayer. A period of neo-absolutism was followed by the Austro-Hungarian Compromise of 1867 and the Croatian–Hungarian Settlement, which granted limited independence to Croatia. This was compounded by Croatian claims of uninterrupted statehood since the early Middle Ages as a basis for a modern state. Two political parties that evolved in the 1860s and contributed significantly to the sentiment were the Party of Rights, led by Starčević and Kvaternik, and the People's Party, led by Janko Drašković, Ivan Kukuljević Sakcinski, Josip Juraj Strossmayer and Ivan Mažuranić. They were opposed by the National Constitutional Party, which was in power for most of the period between the 1860s and the 1918, and advocated closer ties between Croatia and Hungary.

Other significant parties formed in the era were the Serb People's Independent Party, which later formed the Croat-Serb Coalition with the Party of Rights and other Croat and Serb parties. The Coalition ruled Croatia between 1903 and 1918. The leaders of the Coalition were Frano Supilo and Svetozar Pribićević. The Croatian Peasant Party (HSS), established in 1904 and led by Stjepan Radić, advocated Croatian autonomy but achieved only moderate gains by 1918. In Dalmatia, the two major parties were the People's Party – a branch of the People's Party active in Croatia-Slavonia – and the Autonomist Party, advocating maintaining autonomy of Dalmatia, opposite to the People's Party demands for unification of Croatia-Slavonia and Dalmatia. The Autonomist Party, most notably led by Antonio Bajamonti, was also linked to Italian irredentism. By 1900, the Party of Rights had made considerable gains in Dalmatia. The Autonomists won the first three elections, but all elections since 1870 were won by the People's Party. In the period 1861–1918 there were seventeen elections in the Kingdom of Croatia-Slavonia and ten in the Kingdom of Dalmatia.

=== First and Second Yugoslavia ===
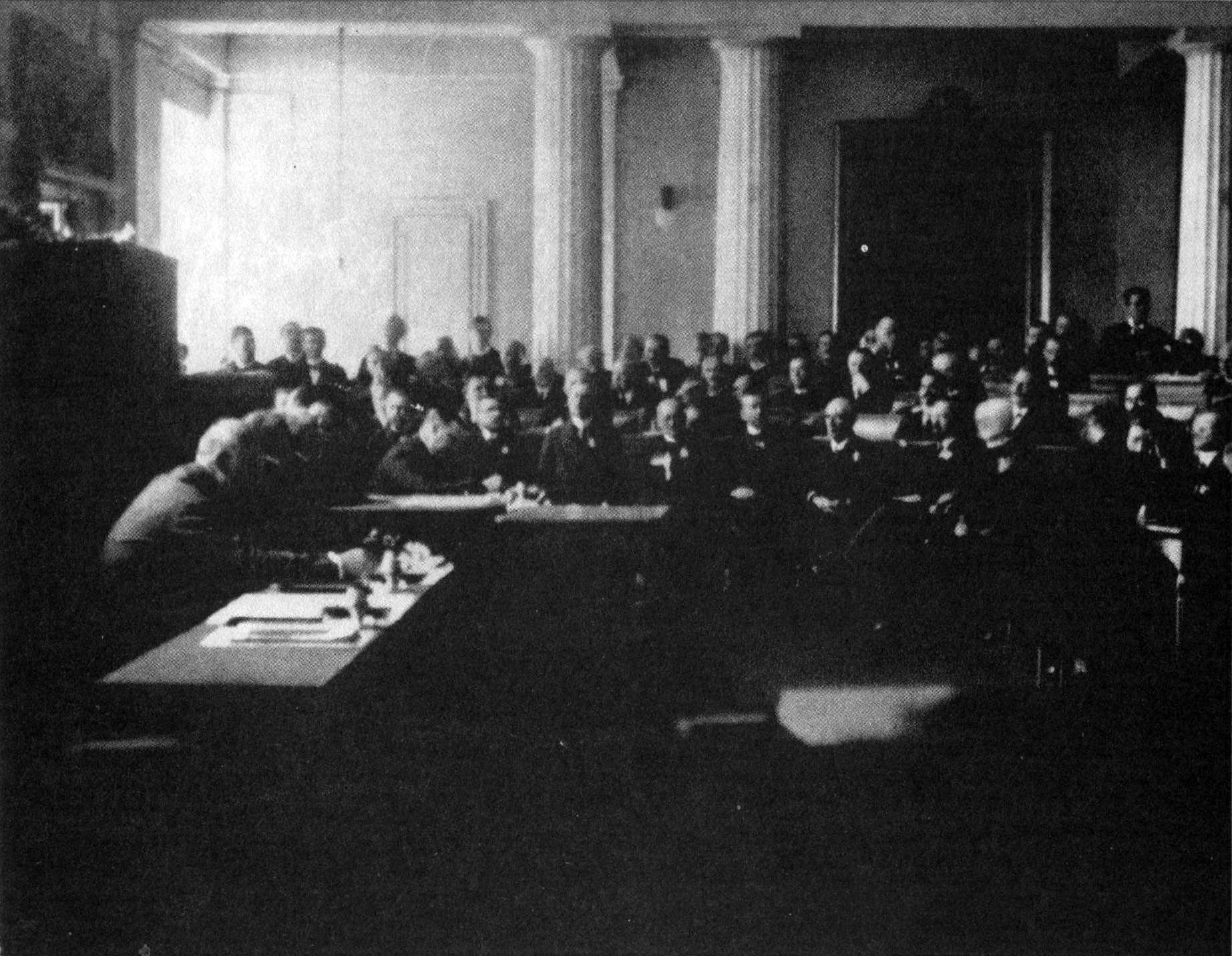
A session of Sabor, 29 October 1918

After the establishment of the Kingdom of Serbs, Croats and Slovenes, the HSS established itself as the most popular Croatian political party and was very popular despite efforts to ban it. The 1921 constitution defined the kingdom as a unitary state and abolished the historical administrative divisions, which effectively ended Croatian autonomy; the constitution was opposed by HSS. The political situation deteriorated further as Stjepan Radić of the HSS was assassinated in the Yugoslav Parliament in 1928, leading to the dictatorship of King Alexander in January 1929. The HSS, now led by Vladko Maček, continued to advocate the federalisation of Yugoslavia, resulting in the Cvetković–Maček Agreement of August 1939 and the autonomous Banovina of Croatia. The Yugoslav government retained control of defence, internal security, foreign affairs, trade, and transport while other matters were left to the Croatian Sabor and a crown-appointed Ban. This arrangement was soon made obsolete with the beginning of World War II, when the Independent State of Croatia, which banned all political opposition, was established. Since then, the HSS continues to operate abroad.

In the 1945 election, the Communists were unopposed because the other parties abstained. Once in power, the Communists introduced a single-party political system, in which the Communist Party of Yugoslavia was the ruling party and the Communist Party of Croatia was its branch. In 1971, the Croatian national movement, which sought greater civil rights and the decentralisation of the Yugoslav economy, culminated in the Croatian Spring, which was suppressed by the Yugoslav leadership. In January 1990, the Communist Party fragmented along national lines; the Croatian faction demanded a looser federation.

=== Modern Croatia ===
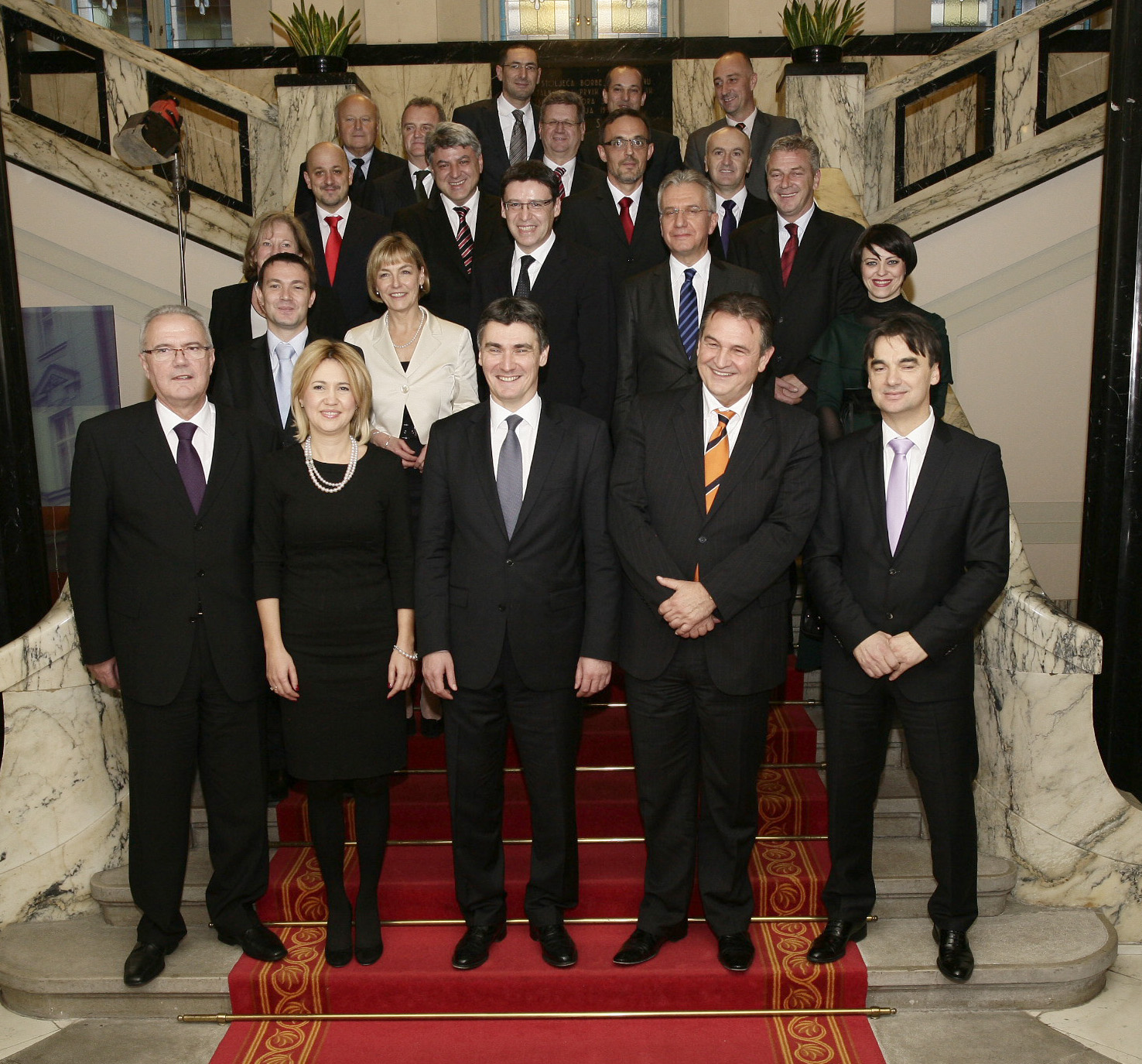
Cabinet of Zoran Milanović in December 2011

In 1989, the government of the Socialist Republic of Croatia decided to tolerate political parties in response to growing demands to allow political activities outside the Communist party. The first political party founded in Croatia since the beginning of the Communist rule was the Croatian Social Liberal Party (HSLS), established on 20 May 1989, followed by the Croatian Democratic Union on 17 June 1989. In December 1989, Ivica Račan became the head of the reformed Communist party. At the same time, the party cancelled political trials, released political prisoners and endorsed a multi-party political system. The Civil Organisations Act was formally amended to allow political parties on 11 January 1990, legalising the parties that were already founded.

By the time of the first round of the first multi-party elections, held on 22 April 1990, there were 33 registered parties. The most relevant parties and coalitions were the League of Communists of Croatia – Party of Democratic Changes (the renamed Communist party), the Croatian Democratic Union (HDZ), and the Coalition of People's Accord (KNS), which included the HSLS led by Dražen Budiša, and the HSS, which resumed operating in Croatia in December 1989. The runoff election was held on 6 May 1990. The HDZ, led by Franjo Tuđman, won ahead of the reformed Communists and the KNS. The KNS, led by Savka Dabčević-Kučar and Miko Tripalo – who had led the Croatian Spring – soon splintered into individual parties. The HDZ maintained a parliamentary majority until the 2000 parliamentary election, when it was defeated by the Social Democratic Party of Croatia (SDP), led by Račan. Franjo Gregurić, of the HDZ, was appointed prime minister to head a national unity government in July 1991 as the Croatian War of Independence escalated in intensity. His appointment lasted until August 1992. During his term, Croatia's declaration of independence from Yugoslavia took effect on 8 October 1991. The HDZ returned to power in the 2003 parliamentary election, while the SDP remained the largest opposition party.

Franjo Tuđman won the presidential elections in 1992 and 1997. During his terms, the Constitution of Croatia, adopted in 1990, provided for a semi-presidential system. After Tuđman's death in 1999, the constitution was amended and much of the presidential powers were transferred to the parliament and the government. Stjepan Mesić won two consecutive terms in 2000 and 2005 on a Croatian People's Party (HNS) ticket. Ivo Josipović, an SDP candidate, won the presidential elections in December 2009 and January 2010. Kolinda Grabar-Kitarović defeated Josipović in the January 2015 election run-off, becoming the first female president of Croatia.

In January 2020, former prime minister Zoran Milanović of the Social Democrats (SDP) won the presidential election. He defeated center-right incumbent Kolinda Grabar-Kitarovic of the ruling Croatian Democratic Union (HDZ) in the second round of the election. In July 2020, the ruling right-wing HDZ won the parliamentary election. Since 2016 ruled HDZ-led coalition of prime minister Andrej Plenković continued to govern. The Economist Intelligence Unit rated Croatia a "flawed democracy" in 2023.

== Legal framework ==
Croatia is a unitary democratic parliamentary republic. Following the collapse of the ruling Communist League, Croatia adopted a new constitution in 1990 – which replaced the 1974 constitution adopted by the Socialist Republic of Croatia – and organised its first multi-party elections. While the 1990 constitution remains in force, it has been amended four times since its adoption—in 1997, 2000, 2001 and 2010. Croatia declared independence from Yugoslavia on 8 October 1991, which led to the breakup of Yugoslavia. Croatia's status as a country was internationally recognised by the United Nations in 1992. Under its 1990 constitution, Croatia operated a semi-presidential system until 2000 when it switched to a parliamentary system. Government powers in Croatia are divided into legislative, executive and judiciary powers. The legal system of Croatia is civil law and, along with the institutional framework, is strongly influenced by the legal heritage of Austria-Hungary. By the time EU accession negotiations were completed on 30 June 2010, Croatian legislation was fully harmonised with the Community acquis. Croatia became a member state of the European Union on 1 July 2013.

== Executive ==
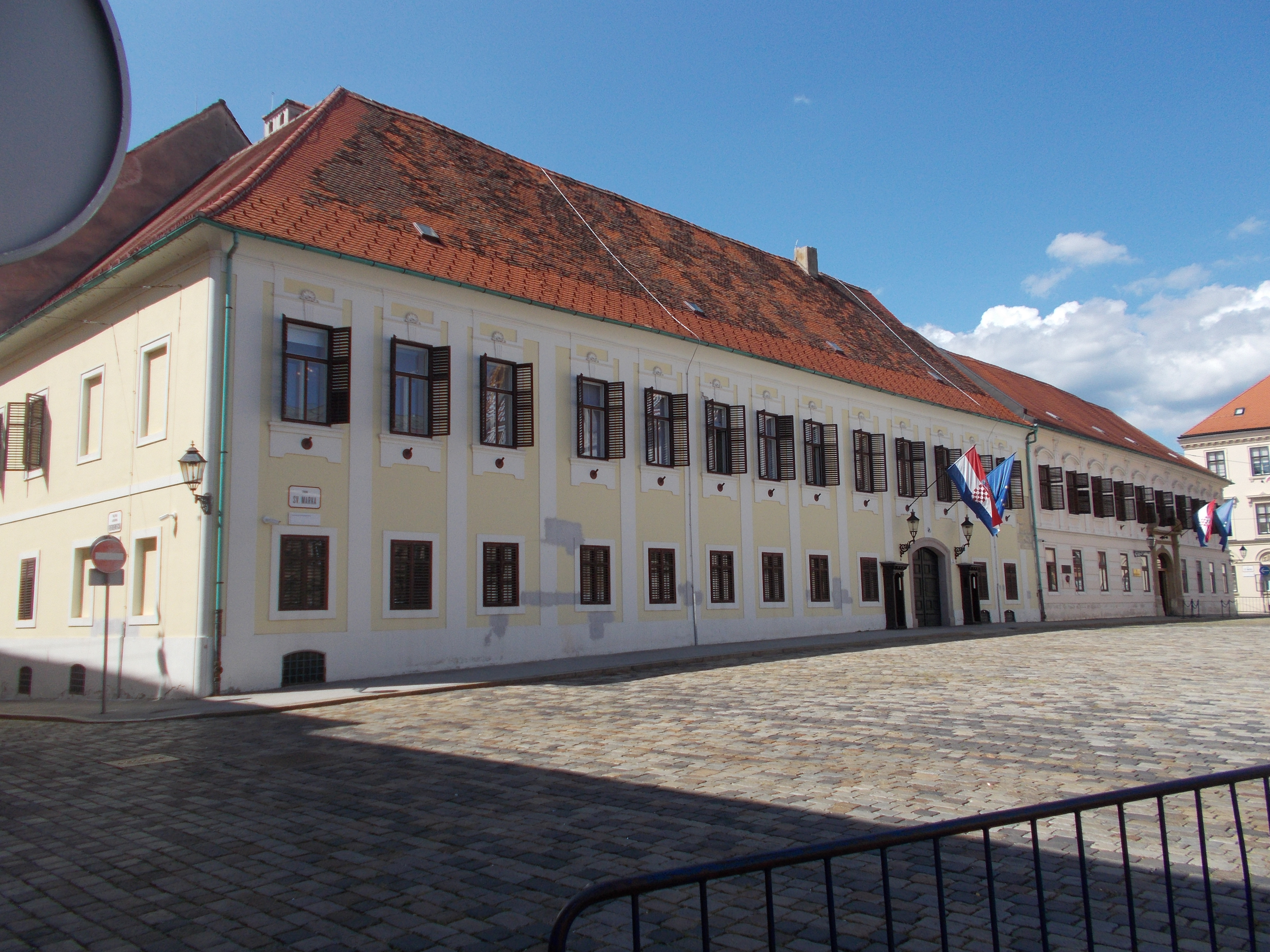
Banski dvori, seat of the Government of Croatia

The President of the Republic (Croatian: Predsjednik/ica Republike) is the head of state. The president is directly elected and serves a five-year term. The president is the commander in chief of the armed forces, has the procedural duty of appointing the prime minister with the consent of the Sabor through a majority vote (majority of all MPs), and has some influence on foreign policy. The most recent presidential election was held on 29 December 2024 and was won by Zoran Milanović. He took the oath of office for his second term on 18 February 2025. The constitution limits holders of the presidential office to a maximum of two terms and prevents the president from being a member of any political party. Consequently, the president-elect withdraws from party membership before inauguration.

The government (Croatian: Vlada), the main executive power of Croatia, is headed by the prime minister who has seven deputies, who also serve as government ministers. There are 11 other ministers who are appointed by the prime minister with the consent of the Sabor (majority of all MPs); these are in charge of particular sectors of activity. As of 29 January 2026, the Deputy Prime Ministers are David Vlajčić, Branko Bačić, Tomo Medved, Ivan Anušić, Tomislav Ćorić, Davor Božinović, and Oleg Butković. Government ministers are from the Croatian Democratic Union (HDZ), and the Homeland Movement (DP). The executive branch is responsible for proposing legislation and a budget, executing the laws, and guiding the country's foreign and domestic policies. The government's official residence is at Banski dvori. As of 19 October 2016, the prime minister is Andrej Plenković.

Main office-holders
Office	Name	Party	Since
President	Zoran Milanović	Social Democratic Party of Croatia	19 February 2020
Prime Minister	Andrej Plenković	Croatian Democratic Union	19 October 2016

== Legislature ==
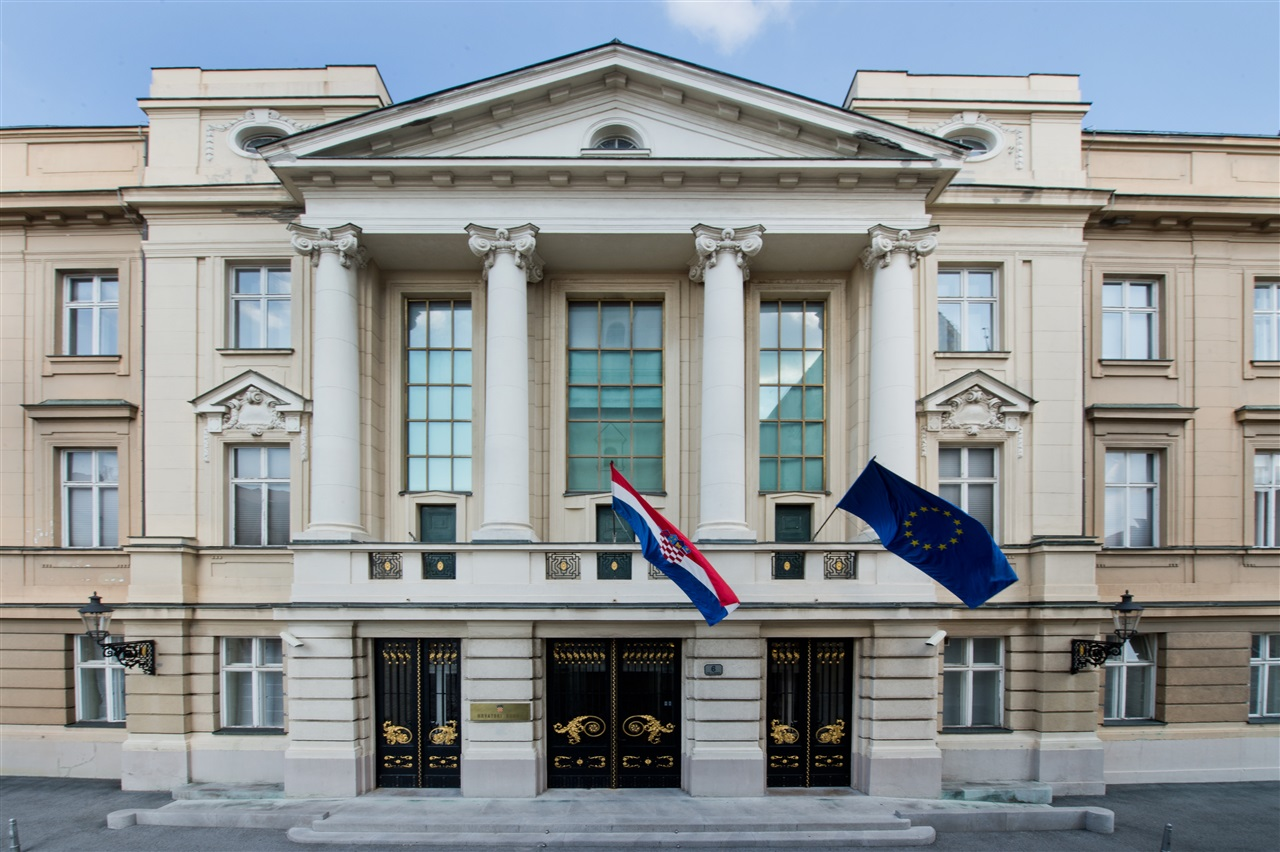
Headquarters of the Sabor, Parliament of the Republic of Croatia

The Croatian Parliament (Croatian: Hrvatski sabor) or the Sabor is a unicameral legislative body. A second chamber, the Chamber of Counties (Croatian: Županijski dom), was set up in 1993 pursuant to the 1990 Constitution. The Chamber of Counties was originally composed of three deputies from each of the twenty counties and the city of Zagreb. However, as it had no practical power over the Chamber of Representatives, it was abolished in 2001 and its powers were transferred to the county governments. The number of Sabor representatives can vary from 100 to 160; they are all elected by popular vote and serve four-year terms. 140 members are elected in multi-seat constituencies, up to six members are chosen by proportional representation to represent Croatians living abroad and five members represent ethnic and national communities or minorities. The two largest political parties in Croatia are the Croatian Democratic Union (HDZ) and the Social Democratic Party of Croatia (SDP). The last parliamentary election was held on 17 April 2024.

The Sabor meets in public sessions in two periods; the first from 15 January to 30 June, and the second from 15 September to 15 December. Extra sessions can be called by the President of the Republic, by the president of the parliament or by the government. The powers of the legislature include enactment and amendment of the constitution, enactment of laws, adoption of the state budget, declarations of war and peace, alteration of the country's boundaries, calling and conducting referendums and elections, appointments and relief of office, supervising the work of the Government of Croatia and other holders of public powers responsible to the Sabor, and granting amnesty. Decisions are made based on a majority vote if more than half of the Chamber is present, except in cases of constitutional issues.

== Elections ==
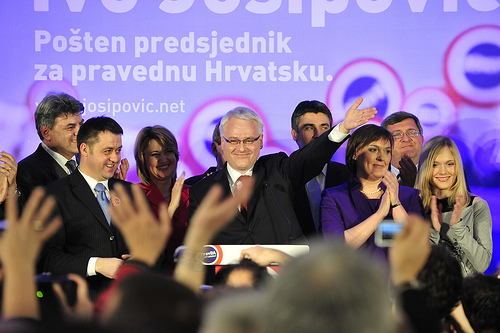
Ivo Josipović, 2010 election victory speech

The Croatian constitution and legislation provides for regular elections for the office of the President of the Republic, parliamentary, county prefects, county assemblies, city and municipal mayors and city and municipal councils. The President of the Republic is elected to a five-year term by a direct vote of all citizens of Croatia. A majority vote is required to win. A runoff election round is held in cases where no candidate secures the majority in the first round of voting. The presidential elections are regulated by the constitution and dedicated legislation; the latter defines technical details, appeals and similar issues.

Map of the Croatian electoral districts from 2023

140 members of parliament are elected to a four-year term in ten multi-seat constituencies, which are defined on the basis of the existing county borders, with amendments to achieve a uniform number of eligible voters in each constituency to within 5%. Citizens of Croatia living abroad are counted in an eleventh constituency; however, its number of seats was not fixed for the last parliamentary election. It was instead calculated based on numbers of votes cast in the ten constituencies in Croatia and the votes cast in the eleventh constituency. In the 2007 parliamentary election the eleventh constituency elected five MPs. Constitutional changes first applied in the 2011 parliamentary election have abolished this scheme and permanently assigned three MPs to the eleventh constituency. Additionally, eight members of parliament are elected by voters belonging to twenty-two recognised minorities in Croatia: the Serb minority elects three MPs, Hungarians and Italians elect one MP each, Czech and Slovak minorities elect one MP jointly, while all other minorities elect two more MPs to the parliament. The Standard D'Hondt formula is applied to the vote, with a 5% election threshold. The last parliamentary election, held in 2016, elected 151 MPs.

The county prefects and city and municipal mayors are elected to four-year terms by majority of votes cast within applicable local government units. A runoff election is held if no candidate achieves a majority in the first round of voting. Members of county, city, and municipal councils are elected to four-year terms through proportional representation; the entire local government unit forms a single constituency. The number of council members is defined by the councils themselves based on applicable legislation. Electoral committees are then tasked with determining whether the national minorities are represented in the council as required by the constitution. If the minorities are not represented, further members, who belong to the minorities and who have not been elected through the proportional representation system, are selected from electoral candidate lists and added to the council.

=== Latest presidential election ===
Candidate	Party	First round		Second round	
Candidate	Party	Votes	%	Votes	%
Zoran Milanović	Independent (Social Democratic Party) (Note: Endorsed by the SDP, HSS, NS-R, NPS, SU, BUZ, Centre, IDS, DO i SIP, Glas and MDS)	797,938	49.68	1,122,859	74.68
Dragan Primorac	Independent (Croatian Democratic Union) (Note: Endorsed by the HDZ, HSU, HDS, DP, HSLS and HNS)	314,663	19.59	380,752	25.32
Marija Selak Raspudić	Independent	150,435	9.37		
Ivana Kekin	We can!	144,533	9.00		
Tomislav Jonjić	Independent (Croatian Party of Rights)	82,787	5.15		
Miro Bulj	The Bridge	62,127	3.87		
Branka Lozo	Home and National Rally	39,321	2.45		
Niko Tokić Kartelo	Independent	14,409	0.90		
Total		1,606,213	100.00	1,503,611	100.00
Valid votes		1,606,213	98.84	1,503,611	96.33
Invalid/blank votes		18,786	1.16	57,209	3.67
Total votes		1,624,999	100.00	1,560,820	100.00
Registered voters/turnout		3,531,622	46.01	3,533,441	44.17
Source: izbori.hr

=== Latest parliamentary election ===
Parties and coalitions		Votes	%	Swing	Seats	+/–
Domestic electoral districts (1st–10th)
HDZ Coalition	HDZ, HSLS, HDS, HNS, HSU	716,564	34.12%	-3.12%	58	-4
Rivers of Justice	SDP, Centar, HSS, GLAS, DO i SIP, Reformisti	538,748	25.65%	+0.78%	42	+2
Homeland Movement Coalition	DP, PiP, BLOK, Green List	202,154	9.63%	-1.26%	14	+2
We Can!		193,051	9.19%	+2.20%	10	+5
Most Coalition	Most, HS	169,332	8.06%	+0.71%	11	-1
Focus–Republic Coalition	Focus, Republic	47,715	2.27%	-0.80%	1	±0
Our Croatia Coalition	IDS, PGS, SD	47,655	2.27%	-2.01%	2	-1
Independent Platform of the North (NPS)		25,830	1.23%	New	2	New
Other parties and independent lists		158,542	7.58%		0	-3
Invalid		59,221	2.74%		-	-
Domestic total		2,099,636	100%	-	140	±0
Registered voters / turnout		3,511,048	62.31%	+13.32%	-	-
District XI – Croatian citizens living abroad
Croatian Democratic Union		13,385	64.21%	+1.12%	3	±0
Most		656	3.15%	-2.62%	0	±0
Homeland Movement		560	2.69%		0	±0
Other District XI lists		6,242	29.95%		0	±0
Invalid		411	1.93%		-	-
District XI total		20,843	100%	-	3	±0
Registered voters / turnout		12,222	41.13%		-	-
District XII – National minority electoral district
Independent Democratic Serb Party		Differing election system			3	±0
Democratic Union of Hungarians of Croatia		Differing election system			1	±0
Croatian Romani Union "Kali Sara"		Differing election system			1	±0
Bosniaks Together!		Differing election system			1	+1
Independents (Italian minority)		Differing election system			1	±0
Independents (Czech/Slovak minority)		Differing election system			1	±0
District XII total		33,914	100%	-	8	±0
Registered voters / turnout		34,763	97.56%		-	-
Total parliamentary seats					151	±0
Source: izbori.hr

=== Latest European elections ===
Party	Votes	%	Seats	+/–
Croatian Democratic Union	264,415	35.13	6	+2
Rivers of Justice	192,859	25.62	4	0
Homeland Movement	66,541	8.84	1	New
We can!	44,670	5.93	1	+1
Fair Play List 9	41,710	5.54	0	-1
Independent list of Nina Skočak	30,369	4.03	0	New
The Bridge–HS–HSP	30,155	4.01	0	-1
Law and Justice	22,425	2.98	0	-2
Determination and Justice	10,328	1.37	0	New
Independent list of Ladislav Ilčić	9,156	1.22	0	New
Ričard Independent	8,757	1.16	0	New
Croatian Party of Pensioners	5,235	0.70	0	New
Workers' Front	4,729	0.63	0	0
Pensioners Together	4,298	0.57	0	New
Movement for Animals	3,060	0.41	0	New
Agrarian Party	2,840	0.38	0	New
Party of Ivan Pernar	2,280	0.30	0	New
Green Alternative – ORaH	1,636	0.22	0	0
Autochthonous Croatian Party of Rights	1,402	0.19	0	0
Republic	1,099	0.15	0	New
Movement for a Modern Croatia	1,005	0.13	0	0
Croatian Civil Resistance Party	986	0.13	0	New
Dalmatian Action	973	0.13	0	New
Righteous Croatia	963	0.13	0	New
Public Good	770	0.10	0	New
Total	752,661	100.00	12	0
Valid votes	752,661	98.50		
Invalid/blank votes	11,428	1.50		
Total votes	764,089	100.00		
Registered voters/turnout	3,731,860	20.47		
Source: izbori.hr

== Judiciary ==
Croatia has a three-tiered, independent judicial system governed by the constitution and national legislation enacted by the Sabor. The Supreme Court (Croatian: Vrhovni sud) is the highest court of appeal in Croatia; its hearings are open and judgments are made publicly, except in cases where the privacy of the accused is to be protected. Judges are appointed by the State Judicial Council and judicial office is permanent until seventy years of age. The president of the Supreme Court is elected for a four-year term by the Croatian Parliament at the proposal of the President of the Republic. As of May 2026, the president of the Supreme Court is Mirta Matić. The Supreme Court has civil and criminal departments. The lower two levels of the three-tiered judiciary consist of county courts and municipal courts. There are fifteen county courts and thirty-two municipal courts in the country.

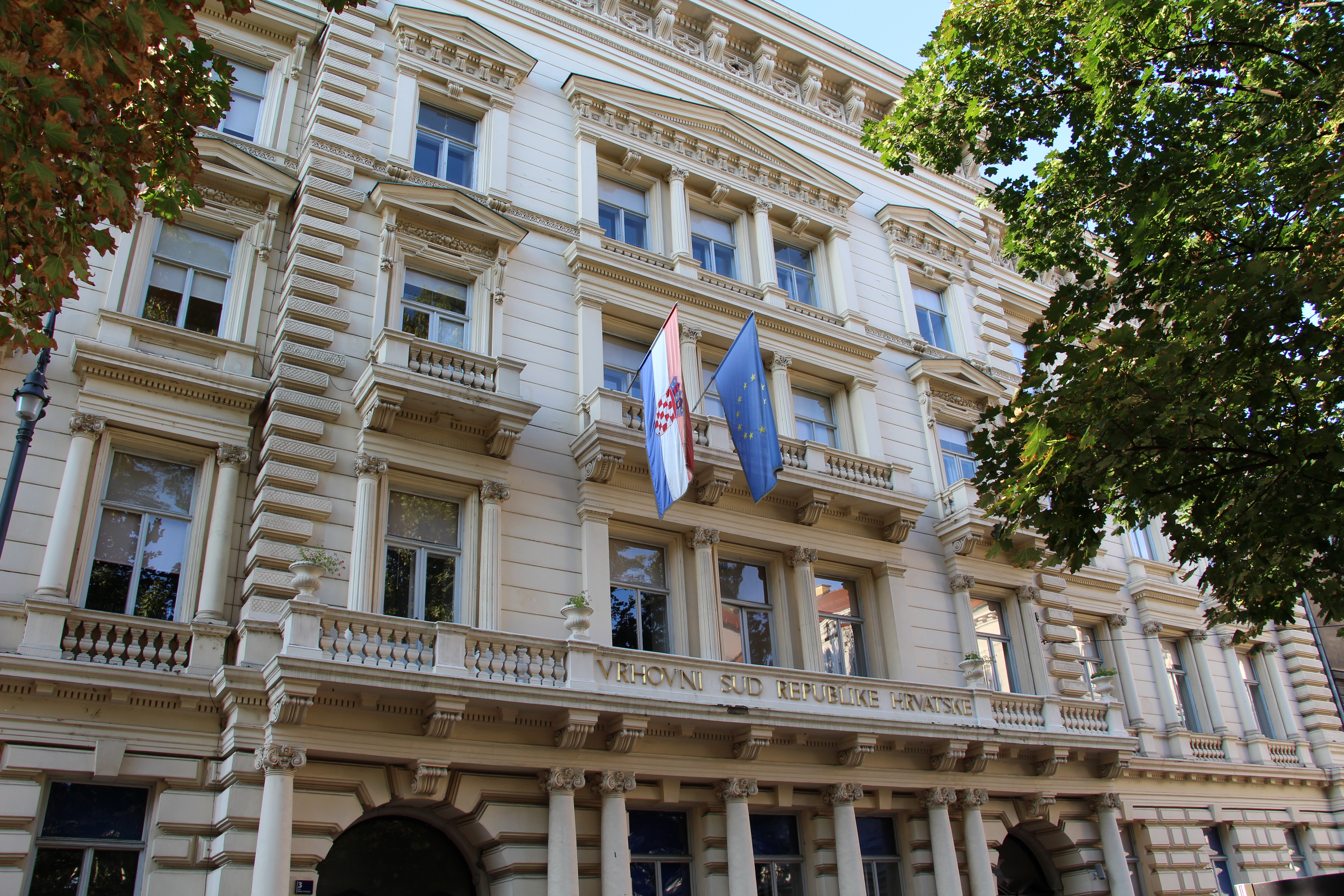
Croatian Supreme Court building

Ordinary courts in Croatia are: municipal courts and county courts.

Specialized courts in Croatia are: commercial courts and the High Commercial Court, administrative courts and the High Administrative Court, the High Misdemeanour Court, the High Criminal Court and the Croatian Constitutional Court (Croatian: Ustavni sud). The Constitutional Court rules on matters regarding compliance of legislation with the constitution, repeals unconstitutional legislation, reports any breaches of provisions of the constitution to the government and the parliament, declares the speaker of the parliament acting president upon petition from the government in the event the country's president becomes incapacitated, issues consent for commencement of criminal procedures against or arrest of the president, and hears appeals against decisions of the State Judicial Council. The court consists of thirteen judges elected by members of the parliament for an eight-year term. The president of the Constitutional Court is elected by the court judges for a four-year term. As of October 2025, the president of the Constitutional Court is Frane Staničić. The State Judicial Council (Croatian: Državno Sudbeno Vijeće) consists of eleven members, specifically seven judges, two university professors of law and two parliament members, nominated and elected by the Parliament for four-year terms, and may serve no more than two terms. It appoints all judges and court presidents, except in case of the Supreme Court. As of March 2023, the president of the State Judicial Council is Darko Milković, who is also a Supreme Court judge.

The State Attorney's Office represents the state in legal procedures. The central office in Zagreb coordinates a decentralized network consisting of fifteen county State Attorney's Offices and twenty-six municipal State Attorney's Offices. The General State Attorney is appointed by the parliament. As of May 2024, Ivan Turudić serves as the Attorney General. A special State Attorney's Office dedicated to combatting corruption and organised crime, USKOK, was set up in late 2001. As of January 2026, the executive of USKOK is Sven Mišković.

== Local government ==
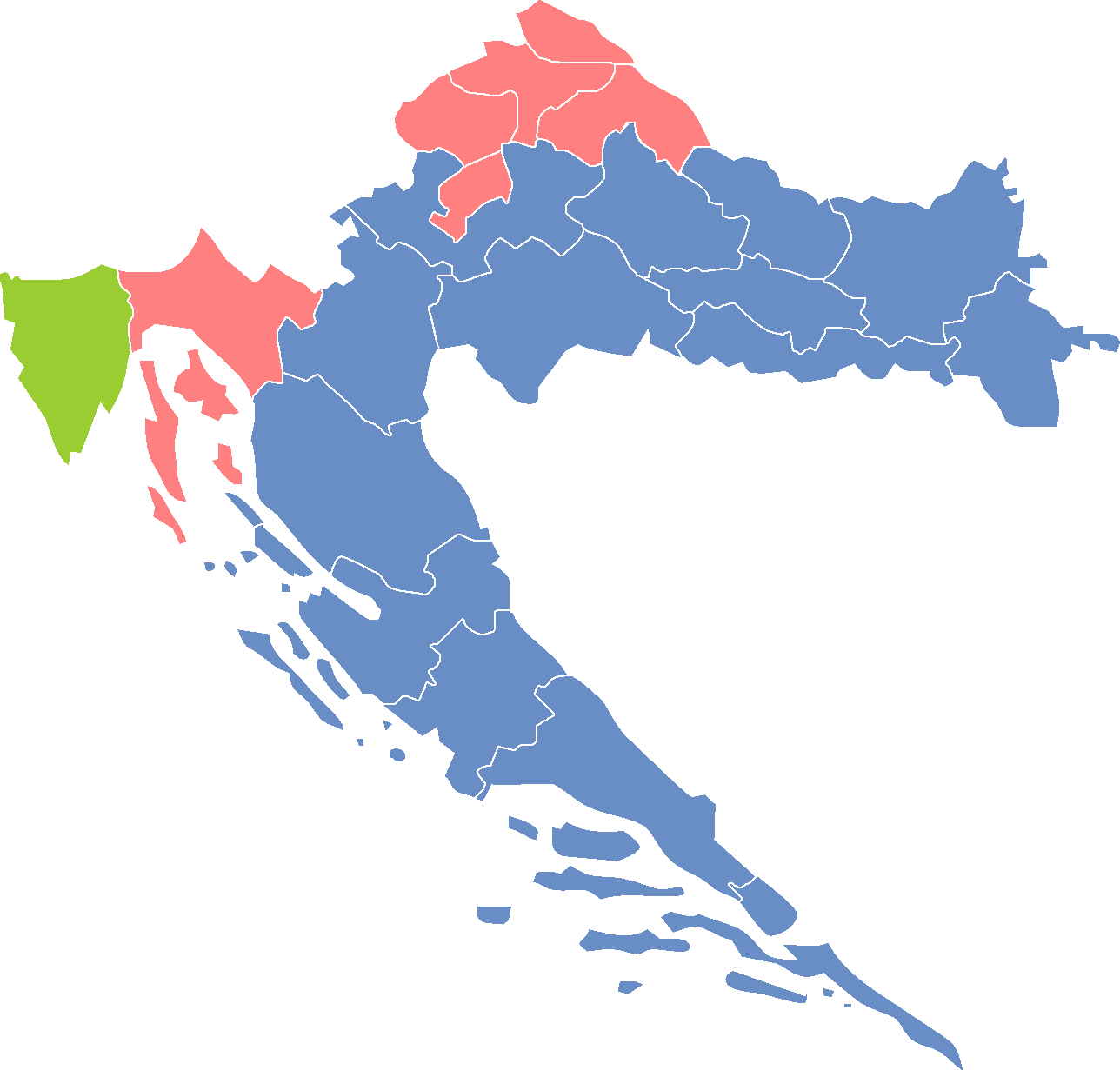
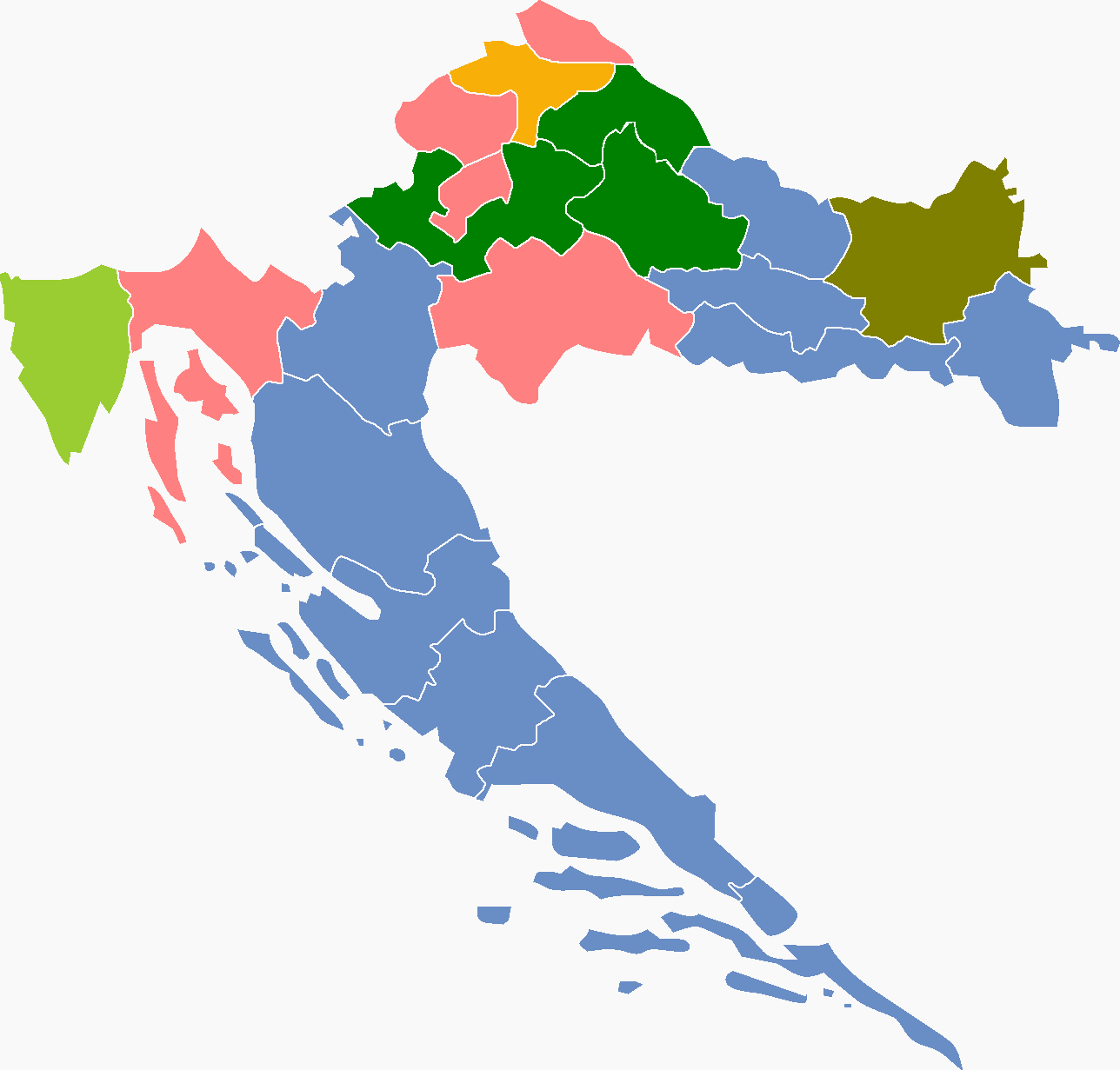
2009 Local elections: County council election winners (left), and county prefect election winners (right)
HDZ SDP HSS IDS HNS-LD HDSSB

Croatia was first subdivided into counties (Croatian: županija) in the Middle Ages. The divisions changed over time to reflect losses of territory to Ottoman conquest and the subsequent recapture of the same territory, and changes to the political status of Dalmatia, Dubrovnik and Istria. The traditional division of the country into counties was abolished in the 1920s, when the Kingdom of Serbs, Croats and Slovenes and the subsequent Kingdom of Yugoslavia introduced oblasts and banovinas respectively. After 1945 under Communist rule, Croatia, as a constituent part of Yugoslavia, abolished these earlier divisions and introduced municipalities, subdividing Croatia into approximately one hundred municipalities. Counties, significantly altered in terms of territory relative to the pre-1920s subdivisions, were reintroduced in 1992 legislation. In 1918, the Transleithanian part of Croatia was divided into eight counties with their seats in Bjelovar, Gospić, Ogulin, Požega, Vukovar, Varaždin, Osijek and Zagreb; the 1992 legislation established fifteen counties in the same territory. Since the counties were re-established in 1992, Croatia is divided into twenty counties and the capital city of Zagreb, the latter having the authority and legal status of a county and a city at the same time. In some instances, the boundaries of the counties have been changed, with the latest revision taking place in 2006. The counties subdivide into 128 cities and 428 municipalities.

The county prefects, city and municipal mayors are elected to four-year terms by a majority of votes cast within applicable local government units. If no candidate achieves a majority in the first round, a runoff election is held. Members of county, city and municipal councils are elected to four-year terms, through proportional representation with the entire local government unit as a single constituency.

The number of members of the councils is defined by the councils themselves, based on applicable legislation. Electoral committees are then tasked with determining whether the national ethnic minorities are represented on the council as required by the constitution. Further members who belong to the minorities may be added to the council if no candidate of that minority has been elected through the proportional representation system. Election silence, as in all other types of elections in Croatia, when campaigning is forbidden, is enforced the day before the election and continues until 19:00 hours on the election day when the polling stations close and exit polls may be announced. Eight nationwide local elections have been held in Croatia since 1990, the most recent being the 2017 local elections to elect county prefects and councils, and city and municipal councils and mayors. In 2017, the HDZ-led coalitions won a majority or plurality in fifteen county councils and thirteen county prefect elections. SDP-led coalitions won a majority or plurality in five county councils, including the city of Zagreb council, and the remaining county council election was won by IDS-SDP coalition. The SDP won two county prefect elections, the city of Zagreb mayoral election, the HSS and the HNS won a single county prefect election each.

Counties of Croatia

County	Seat	Area (km^{2})	Population
Bjelovar-Bilogora	Bjelovar	2,652	101,879
Brod-Posavina	Slavonski Brod	2,043	130,267
Dubrovnik-Neretva	Dubrovnik	1,783	115,564
Istria	Pazin	2,820	195,794
Karlovac	Karlovac	3,622	112,195
Koprivnica-Križevci	Koprivnica	1,746	101,221
Krapina-Zagorje	Krapina	1,224	120,702
Lika-Senj	Gospić	5,350	42,469
Međimurje	Čakovec	730	105,250
Osijek-Baranja	Osijek	4,152	258,719
Požega-Slavonia	Požega	1,845	64,420
Primorje-Gorski Kotar	Rijeka	3,582	266,183
Šibenik-Knin	Šibenik	2,939	96,381
Sisak-Moslavina	Sisak	4,463	139,603
Split-Dalmatia	Split	4,534	425,412
Varaždin	Varaždin	1,261	159,747
Virovitica-Podravina	Virovitica	2,068	70,660
Vukovar-Srijem	Vukovar	2,448	144,438
Zadar	Zadar	3,642	160,085
Zagreb County	Zagreb	3,078	299,983
City of Zagreb	Zagreb	641	767,131

== See also ==
- List of political parties in Croatia
- Foreign relations of Croatia
- Left-wing politics in Croatia
- Far-right politics in Croatia
