= Milan Vuković =

Milan Vuković may refer to:

- Milan Vuković (footballer)
- Milan Vuković (judge)
