= Judiciary of Croatia =

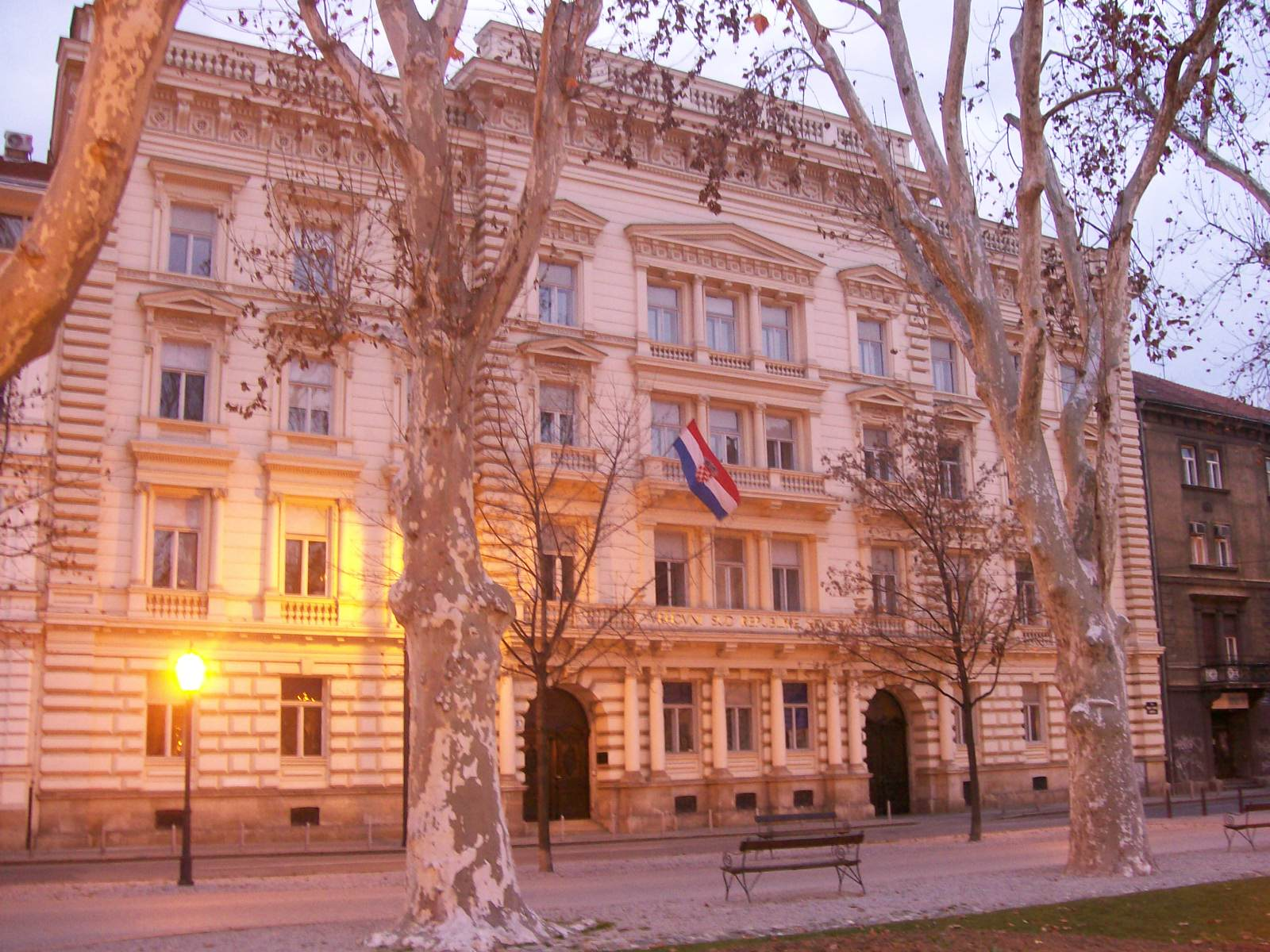
Croatian Supreme Court building

The judiciary of Croatia is a branch of the Government of Croatia that interprets and applies the laws of Croatia, to ensure equal justice under law, and to provide a mechanism for dispute resolution. The legal system of Croatia is a civil law system, historically influenced by Austrian, Hungarian and Yugoslav law, but during the accession of Croatia to the European Union, the legal system was almost completely harmonised with European Union law. The Constitution of Croatia provides for an independent judiciary, led by a Supreme Court and a Constitutional Court. The Ministry of Justice handles the administration of courts and judiciary, including paying salaries and constructing new courthouses. It also administers the prison system.

== Structure ==
The judiciary is a three-tiered system of courts, at the highest tier of which is the Supreme Court (Vrhovni sud) which is the highest court of appeal and court of cassation. The President of the Supreme Court is appointed for a four-year term by the Croatian Parliament, upon the proposal of the President of the Republic—following a mandatory public call issued by the State Judicial Council (Državno sudbeno vijeće)—and after obtaining the prior opinions of the Parliament's Justice Committee and the Plenary Session of the Supreme Court.

The lower two levels of the judiciary consist of 15 county courts (županijski sudovi) as courts of first instance for serious criminal offences (felonies) and courts of appeal for decisions of the lower (municipal) courts and 34 municipal courts (općinski sudovi) as courts of first instance for misdemeanours and minor criminal offences and courts of original jurisdiction (first instance) in civil (including family and labour) lawsuits (county courts and municipal courts are knowns as general or ordinary courts), as well as specialized courts: 9 commercial courts (trgovački sudovi) and the High Commercial Court (Visoki trgovački sud); 4 administrative courts (upravni sudovi) and the High Administrative Court (Visoki upravni sud), the High Criminal Court (Visoki kazneni sud) and the High Misdemeanour Court (Visoki prekršajni sud).

Municipal courts are established for the territory of one or more municipalities, one or more towns/cities or parts of an urban area, and the county, commercial and administrative courts are established for the territory of one or more counties. The High Commercial Court, the High Administrative Court, the High Criminal Court, the High Misdemeanour Court and the Supreme Court are established for the territory of the Republic of Croatia.

Judges are appointed by the State Judicial Council and hold office until the age of seventy.

== Constitutional Court ==
The Constitutional Court (Ustavni sud) rules on matters regarding compliance of legislation with the constitution, repeals unconstitutional legislation, reports any breaches of provisions of the constitution to the government and the parliament, declares the speaker of the parliament acting president upon petition from the government in the event the country's president becomes incapacitated, issues consent for commencement of criminal procedures against or arrest of the president, and hears appeals against decisions of the State Judicial Council. It also resolves jurisdictional disputes between the legislative, executive and judicial branches, supervises the constitutionality of the programmes and activities of political parties and supervises the constitutionality and legality of elections, state referendums, etc.

The court consists of thirteen judges elected by members of the parliament for an eight-year term (by two thirds majority of all MPs). The president of the Constitutional Court is elected by the court judges for a four-year term.

Even considered to be de facto the highest judicial authority because it can overturn Supreme Court decisions on the basis of constitutional breaches, it is not part of the judicial branch of government, but rather a court sui generis, and it is therefore often colloquially referred to as a "fourth branch of government", alongside the traditional model of tripartite separation of powers into the executive, legislative and the judicial branches.

== State Judicial Council ==
The State Judicial Council (Državno sudbeno vijeće) consists of eleven members, specifically seven judges, nominated and elected by judges of the courts of all instances; two university professors of law, nominated and elected by the law schools of all Croatian universities and two MPs (one of whom must be from the opposition parties), nominated and elected by the Parliament, for four-year terms, and serving no more than two terms. It appoints all judges and court presidents, except for the president of the Supreme Court and Constitutional Court judges. The State Judicial Council decides also on disciplinary proceedings concerning all judges.

== State Attorneys ==
The State Attorney's Office (Državno odvjetništvo) represents the state in legal procedures (criminal, civil, administrative). The office is led by the Attorney General (Glavni državni odvjetnik Republike Hrvatske), and assisted by twenty-three deputies in the central office and lower-ranking State Attorneys and deputies at fifteen county and twenty-two municipal State Attorney's Offices. The Attorney General is appointed for a four-year term by the Croatian Parliament upon the motion of the Croatian Government and following a prior opinion of the Parliament's Justice Committee. A special State Attorney's Office dedicated to combatting corruption and organised crime, USKOK, was set up in late 2001.

The Attorney General is not a member of the Croatian government/cabinet, since the office is part of the European continental legal system, based on the civil law system.

County and Municipal State's Attorneys and Deputy state's attorneys (in the Office of the Attorney General, in the county and municipal state's attorney offices, zamjenici državnog odvjetnika) are appointed for a four-year term by the National State's Attorney Council consisting of seven deputy state's attorneys (elected among and by them from the Office of Attorney General, from county and municipal offices), two university professors of law (chosen by the Croatian universities) and two MPs (one of whom must be from the opposition parties); with a prior opinion issued by the Minister of Justice and the Collegiate Body of the State's Attorney Office. The National State's Attorney Council decides also on disciplinary proceedings concerning state's attorney and deputy state's attorneys (except the Attorney General).
