= Milan Vuković (judge) =

Croatian politician

Justice of the Constitutional Court of Croatia
- In office 10 October 1991 – 2 July 1992
- In office 19 October 1995 – 20 February 1997
- In office 7 December 1999 – 7 December 2007

President of the Supreme Court of Croatia
- In office 2 July 1992 – 19 October 1995
- Preceded by: Vjekoslav Vidović
- Succeeded by: Krunislav Olujić
- In office 20 February 1997 – 4 November 1999
- Preceded by: Krunislav Olujić
- Succeeded by: Marijan Ramušćak

Personal details
- Born: 18 August 1933 Krilo-Jesenice, Kingdom of Yugoslavia (modern Croatia)
- Died: 16 March 2018 (aged 84) Zagreb, Croatia

Milan Vuković (18 August 1933 - 16 March 2018), was a Croatian jurist, president of the Supreme Court of Croatia and judge of the Constitutional Court of Croatia.

== Biography ==
Vuković was born in a peasant family in Krilo near Split. He graduated at the Classical gymnasium in Split in 1952 and at the Faculty of Law, University of Zagreb in 1956. After a two-year military service as a reserve officer, he worked in a Secretariat of Justice and Public Administration. He finished his law practice in Zagreb in 1960 and became a lawyer in 1961. He was a member of the League of Communists of Yugoslavia.

Vuković was elected judge of the Constitutional Court of Croatia for the first time in 1991, and later again both in 1995 and 1999. He was twice president of the Supreme Court of Croatia (1992–1995, 1997–1999). He was one of the members of the Constituent Assembly, responsible for writing Croatian Constitution in 1990, as well as member of the Commission for war crimes (1993–1995) and State Judicial Council of Croatia (1994-1995).

He is recipient of the Order of Ante Starčević, Order of Duke Trpimir and Homeland War Memorial Medal.
