= Damir Vanđelić =

Croatian politician

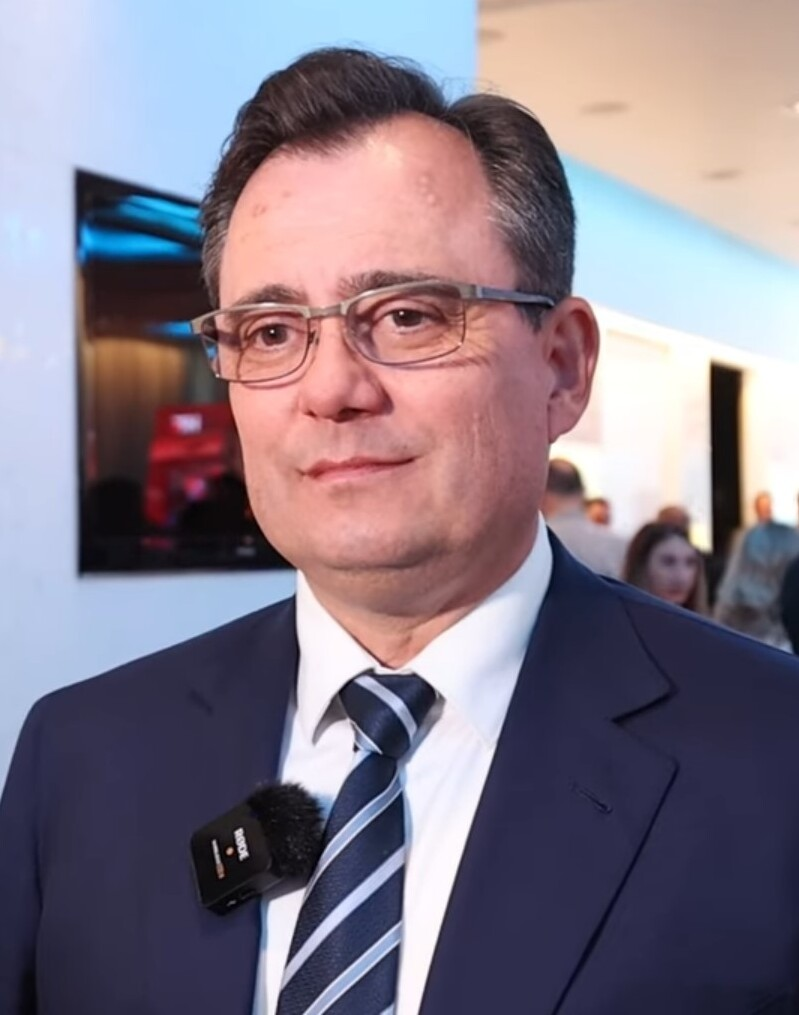
- Vanđelić in 2024

President of Republic
- In office 2 December 2023 – 24 October 2026
- Preceded by: Position established
- Succeeded by: Position abolished

Personal details
- Born: 11 February 1968 (age 58) Zagreb, SR Croatia, SFR Yugoslavia
- Party: Focus
- Education: University of Zagreb; University of Liverpool; Alma Mater Europaea University
- Awards: Homeland War Memorial Medal

Damir Vanđelić (born 11 February 1968) is a Croatian politician, manager, mechanical engineer and veteran who was the only president of the political party Republic, which he founded. The party merged into the party Focus of which Vanđelić became the vice president.

== Early life and education ==
Damir Vanđelić was born in Zagreb on February 11, 1968 where he completed primary and secondary school. He graduated from the Faculty of Mechanical Engineering and Naval Architecture in Zagreb, majoring in mechanical engineering. He received a rector’s award and the faculty medal for being the best student in his class.

== Croatian War of Independence ==
He fought during the Croatian War of Independence and was captured by Serb forces on September 12, 1991 in Hrvatska Kostajnica. He was first taken to Donji Kukuruzari and then to the internment camp in Glina where he was subjected to abuse and torture. He spent a total of 183 days in captivity before being freed in a prisoner exchange. For his service he received the Homeland War Memorial Medal.

== Career ==
He completed an MBA program in 2008 at the University of Liverpool. He pursued further training at the Institute of Brewing and Distilling in London and at Heriot-Watt University in Edinburgh.

He was a member of the management board of Adris Grupa, chairman of the supervisory board of INA from 2016, and chairman of the Council of the Croatian Financial Services Supervisory Agency. From 2016, he served as president of the management board of Croatia osiguranje.

He was appointed to the Homeland Security Council in 2015, an external advisory body to the president of Croatia established during the term of Kolinda Grabar-Kitarović. During the political crisis over the formation of a coalition Government between the Croatian Democratic Union and The Bridge, she proposed him as interim prime minister, an offer that Vanđelić ultimately did not accept.

He was the director of the Zagreb Reconstruction Fund from October 2020 to November 2021 following the 2020 Zagreb earthquake.

== Political career ==
On December 2, 2023, Vanđelić founded the political party Republic, naming it after the Republic of Ragusa.

He expressed support for the 2024 Zagreb protest saying "it is a clear sign of resistance to the robbery and crime we witness every day".

In March 2024, his party entered into a coalition with the party Focus for the 2024 Croatian parliamentary election, in which Vanđelić was the coalition’s candidate for prime minister. The coalition won one seat in the election, which went to Dario Zurovec from Focus.

On October 24, 2026, Vanđelić signed an agreement merging his party into Focus. Gabrijel Deak remained the president while Vanđelić became the vice president of the party.
