= Republic (Croatian political party) =

Croatian political party

Republic Republika
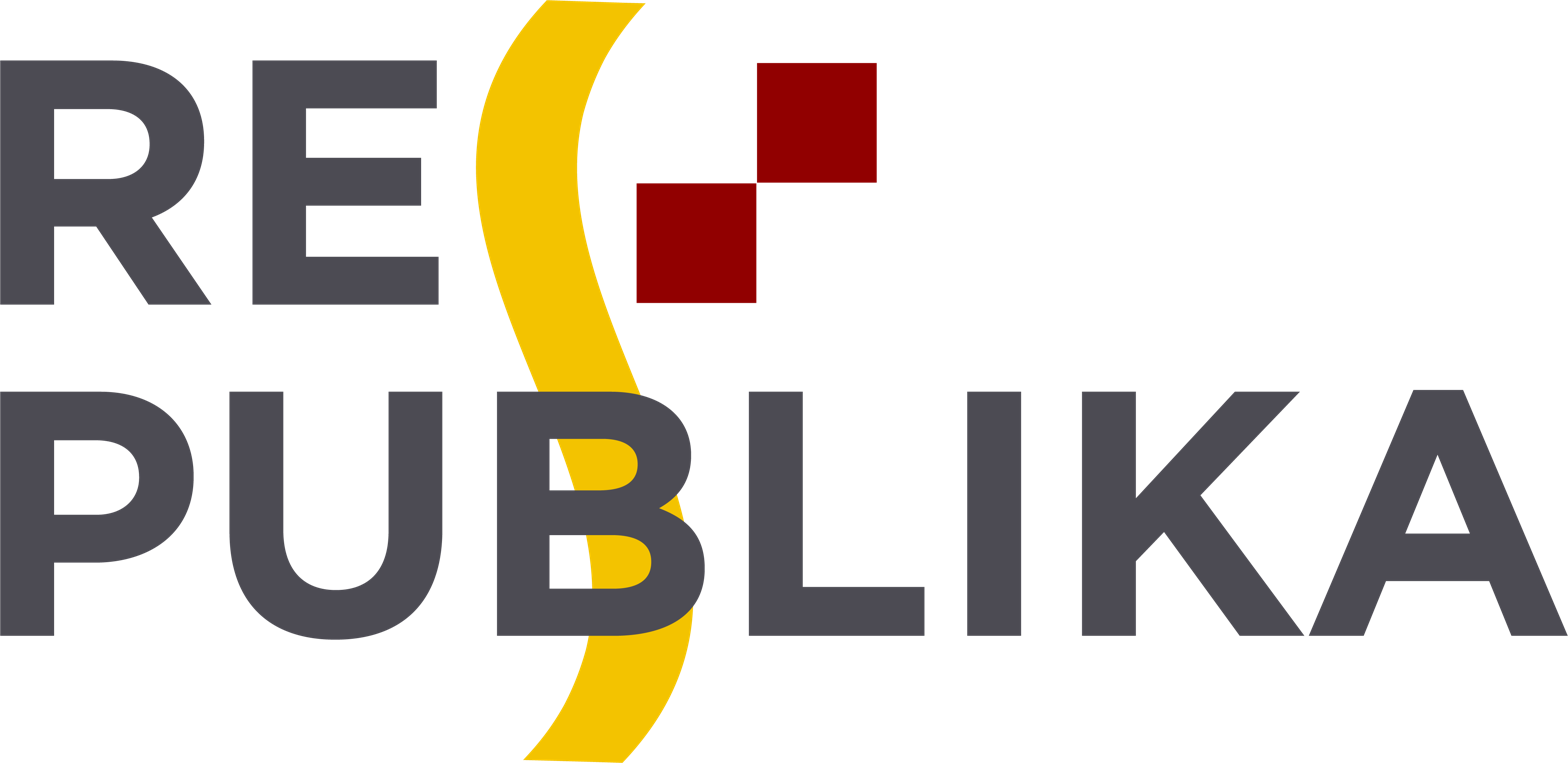
- Abbreviation: REPUBLIKA
- President: Damir Vanđelić
- General Secretary: Krešimir Kuterovac
- Founder: Damir Vanđelić
- Founded: 2 December 2023
- Dissolved: 24 October 2026
- Merged into: Focus
- Headquarters: Masarykova ulica 10, Zagreb
- Ideology: Reformism; Liberalism
- Political position: Centre to centre-right
- National affiliation: Focus – Republic
- Colours: Gold; Maroon
- Slogan: "For a Croatia of happy people!" ("Za Hrvatsku sretnih ljudi!")
- Sabor: 0 / 151
- European Parliament: 0 / 12
- County Prefects: 0 / 21
- Mayors: 0 / 128

Website
- republika.hr

Republic (Croatian: Republika), formally Res Publica (Latin: lit. 'public affair') in English, was a centrist political party in Croatia. The party's founder and president was Damir Vanđelić. It ran in the 2024 parliamentary election in a coalition with Focus.

== Name and symbol ==
The party's name was inspired by Dubrovnik's Republic of Ragusa. By its statut, the party's international name is Res Publica (Latin: public affair). The party's symbol is a golden marten, the national animal of Croatia.

== History ==
On 2 December 2023, the party was founded and introduced to the public by its leader Damir Vanđelić, ahead of the parliamentary election of the upcoming year. Vanđelić, a former head of the INA supervisory board and director of the Reconstruction Fund, was previously in negotiations with Croatian Democratic Union to be their candidate for Mayor of Zagreb in the 2021 Zagreb local elections, but he refused.

The party members are described as people successful in their fields, most of whom haven't been politically active before. The six vice presidents elected at the founding convention included Vesna Škare-Ožbolt, former Minister of Justice in the cabinet of Ivo Sanader (2003–2006), Gordana Deranja, former head of Croatian Employers Association, and Dario Marenić, former deputy leader of Croatian Party of Rights — Dr. Ante Starčević.

On 17 January 2024, Škare-Ožbolt left the party as it "violated her integrity".

The party announced a coalition with a liberal party Focus for the parliamentary election. The coalition, with Vanđelić as the candidate for Prime Minister, is focused on lowering taxes, implementing reforms and fighting corruption. Republic failed to enter Sabor.

== Ideology ==
Vanđelić described the party's ideology as "widely centrist", with elements of social policies and "strategies that would usually be attributed to the so-called centre-right". When asked about abortion on N1, he gave a controversial statement for saying that, while the final decision is on the woman, "a woman's greatest urge is to bear (a baby)".

== Election results ==
=== Legislative ===
| Election | Coalition | Votes | % | Seats | +/– | Government |
| Election | Coalition | Coalition totals | | Republika only | | Government |
|---|---|---|---|---|---|---|
| 2024 | Fokus | 47,715 | 2.25 (6th) | 0 / 151 | New | Extra-parliamentary |

=== European Parliament ===
| Election | List leader | Coalition | Votes | % | Seats | +/– | EP Group |
| Election | List leader | Coalition | Coalition | | Republika | | EP Group |
|---|---|---|---|---|---|---|---|
| 2024 | Luka Kraljević | None | 1,099 | 0.15 (#17) | 0 / 12 | New | – |
