= Focus (Croatian political party) =

Croatian political party

Focus Fokus
- President: Gabrijel Deak
- Vice-presidents: Petra Škrobot; Damir Vanđelić
- Founder: Davor Nađi
- Founded: 27 March 2020
- Split from: HNS-LD
- Headquarters: Savska cesta 41; Zagreb
- Membership (2024): 579
- Ideology: Classical liberalism Economic liberalism Fiscal conservatism
- Political position: Centre to centre-right
- National affiliation: Focus – Republic; Rivers of Justice (2024)
- Colours: Light blue Dark blue
- Slogan: Focus on the important. (Croatian: Fokus na bitno.)
- Sabor: 0 / 151 (0%)
- European Parliament: 0 / 12 (0%)
- County Prefects: 0 / 21
- Mayors: 1 / 128

Website
- fokusnabitno.com

Focus (Croatian: Fokus) is a liberal political party in Croatia. It was founded by independent politicians and entrepreneurs from the Zagreb County area.

== History ==
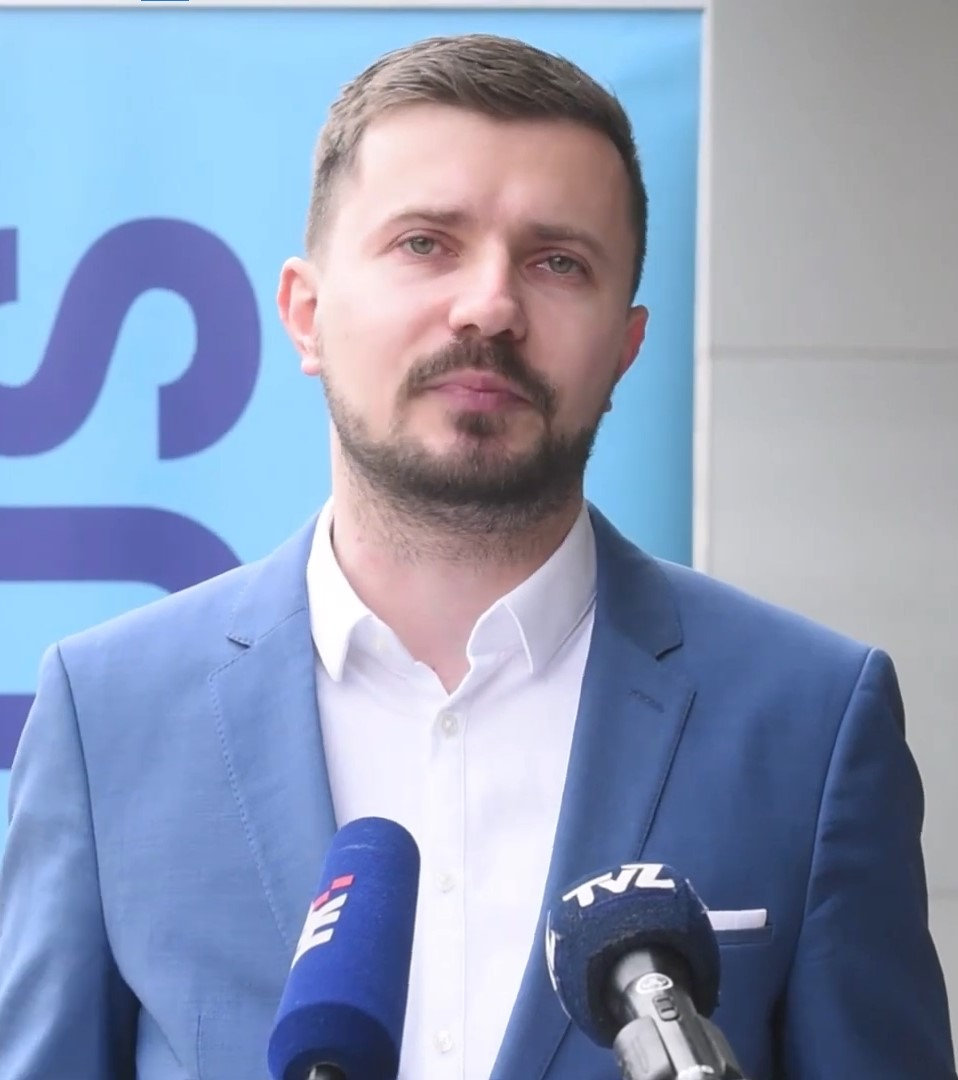
Davor Nađi, the first party president

The First President of the party is Davor Nađi, at the time deputy mayor of Sveta Nedelja (previously a member for Croatian People's Party – Liberal Democrats, HNS–LD). The party elected Ivan Gulam, mayor of Pirovac (also formerly of HNS–LD), as Deputy Leader, and Dario Vrbaslija, president of the Slatina town council (ran locally as an independent, before that a member of Croatian Democratic Union, HDZ), as party Vice President.

Focus first participated in the 2020 Croatian parliamentary elections in coalition with Party with a First and Last Name (led by Dalija Orešković) and Pametno, with the alliance winning three seats in the Sabor, one each. The candidate elected from the Focus list was Dario Zurovec, mayor of Sveta Nedjelja, in District VII. From December 2020 until June 2021, his seat was occupied by party leader Davor Nađi, who acts as deputy representative.

The party also participated in the 2021 Croatian local elections, winning the mayoralties of Sveta Nedelja, Dugo Selo, and Križ in the first round, as well as mayoralty of Samobor in the runoff.

In May 2023, Focus was admitted as a full member into the Alliance of Liberals and Democrats for Europe Party (ALDE). As of 2026, the party is no longer listed as a member on ALDE's website or on the APPF's list of ALDE members.

The party participated in the 2024 parliamentary election in a coalition with Republic and the two parties elected won one seat, re-electing Fokus MP Dario Zurovec. On 24 August 2024, Zurovec, together with Nenad Panian (mayor of Dugo Selo), Marko Magdić (municipality president of Križ), as well as some of the party's local councilors and other members, left the party leaving Samobor and Sveti Ivan Zelina as the only mayorship positions held by Focus.

On 24 October 2026, Republic and Focus formalized an agreement at a joint unification convention to merge the former into Focus, with the technical process of the merger excpected to be finished within a month. The parties stressed their shared economic liberalism and goals of lowering taxes and bureaucracy. Republic leader Damir Vanđelić became the vice-president of Focus.

== Political program ==
The basic messages that the party advocates with its program are:

- Lower taxes (with the model used in Estonia given as an example) and regulatory burdens.
- Fewer employees in the government administration with increased efficiency, transparency and the introduction of digital transformation.
- Adapting to climate change through the concept of a green economy based on innovation and investments in infrastructure.

== Election results ==
=== Legislative ===
Election	Coalition	Votes	%	Seats	+/–	Government
Election	Coalition	Coalition totals		Fokus only		Government
2020	IP–Pametno	66,399	3.98 (6th)	1 / 151	New	Opposition
2024	Republika	47,715	2.25 (6th)	1 / 151	0	Opposition

== See also ==
- List of members of the Sabor, 2020–2024
