= Sabor Palace =

Parliament building in Zagreb, Croatia

- (in Croatian) Palača hrvatskog sabora, Saborska palača
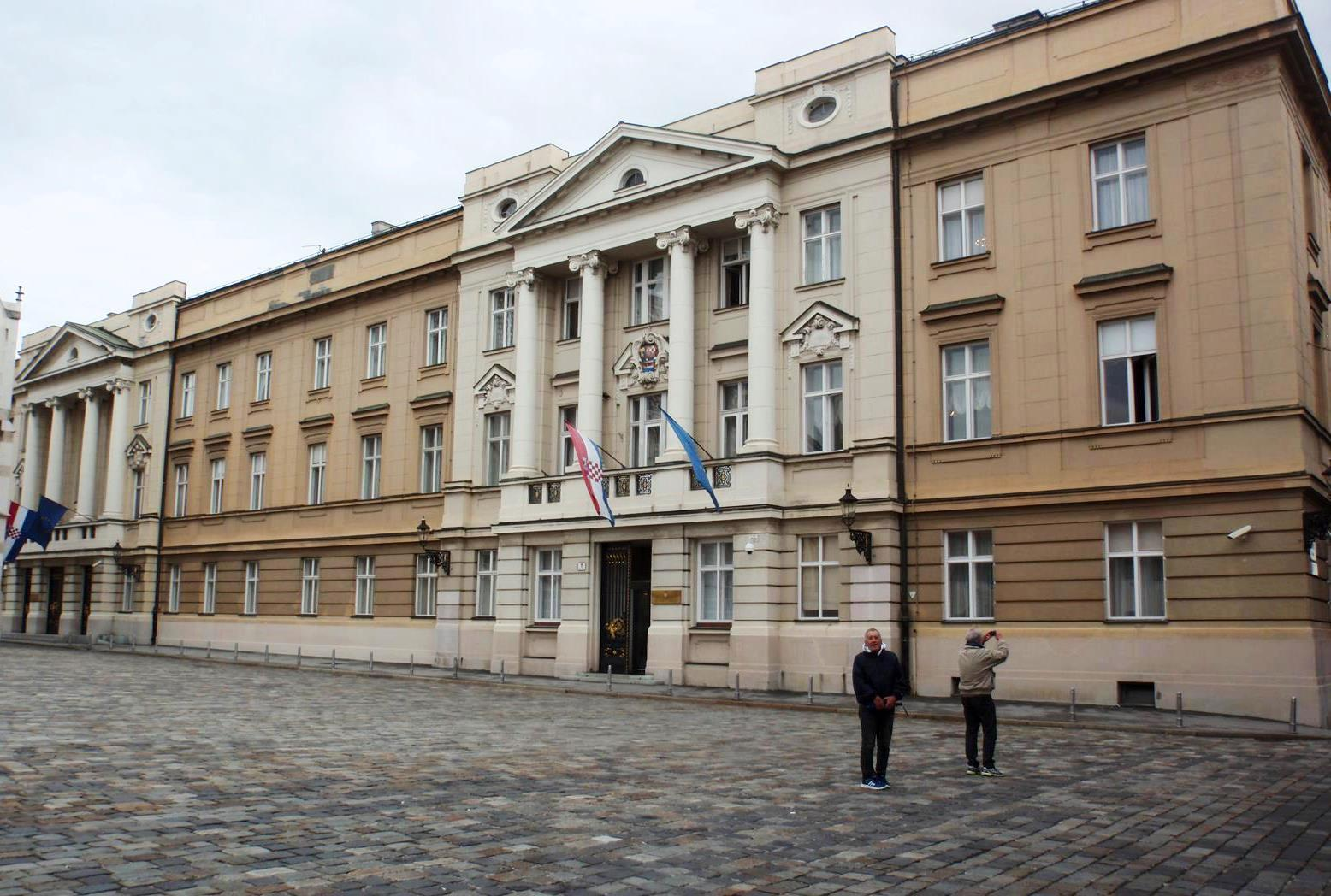
- West front

General information
- Architectural style: Classicism, Neo-renaissance, Secession
- Location: Gornji grad, Zagreb, Croatia
- Coordinates: 45°48′58″N 15°58′27″E
- Completed: 1737 (first building); 1849 (second building); 1911 (final look and expansion); 2028 (renovation)

Design and construction
- Architects: Matthias Leonhart, Aleksandar Brdarić, Lav Kalda, Karlo Susan

Sabor Palace (Croatian: Saborska palača) is a historic building in Gornji Grad, Zagreb, which houses the Croatian Parliament, called Sabor. The place first housed the initial building for the parliament of Croatia, Dalmatia, and Slavonia in 1737, and the current building got its final expansion and overhaul in 1911.

== History ==
=== First building ===
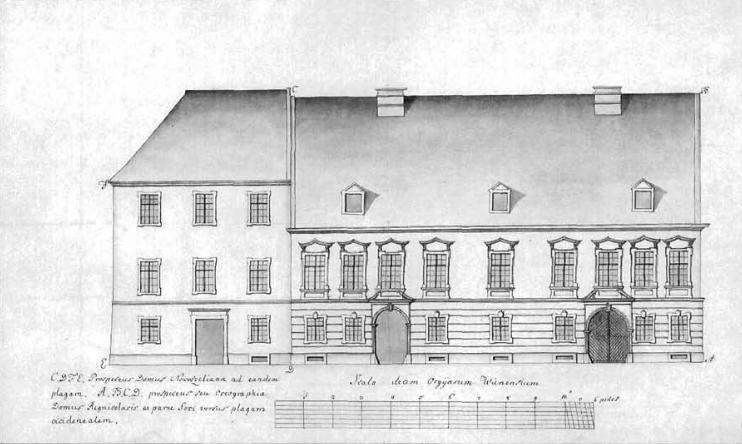
First Sabor palace from a 1770 drawing (right)

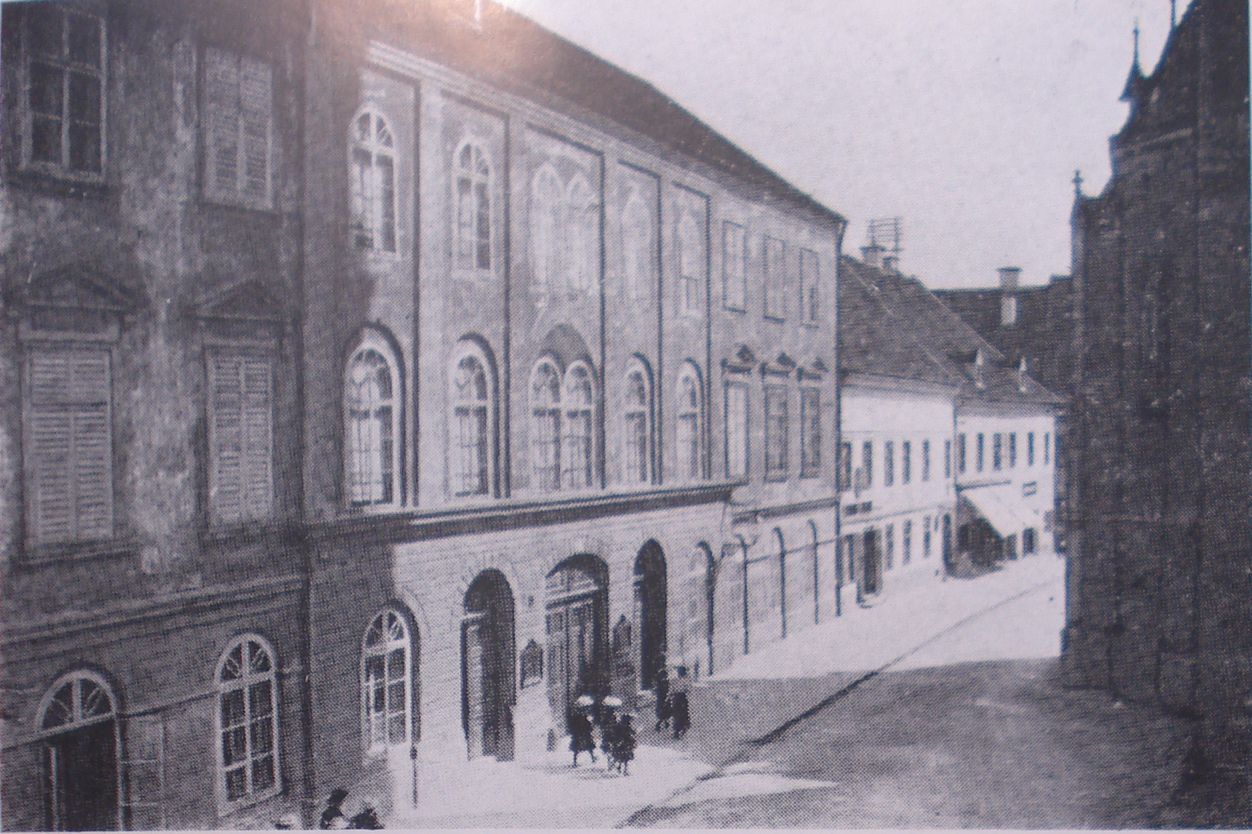
1849 building

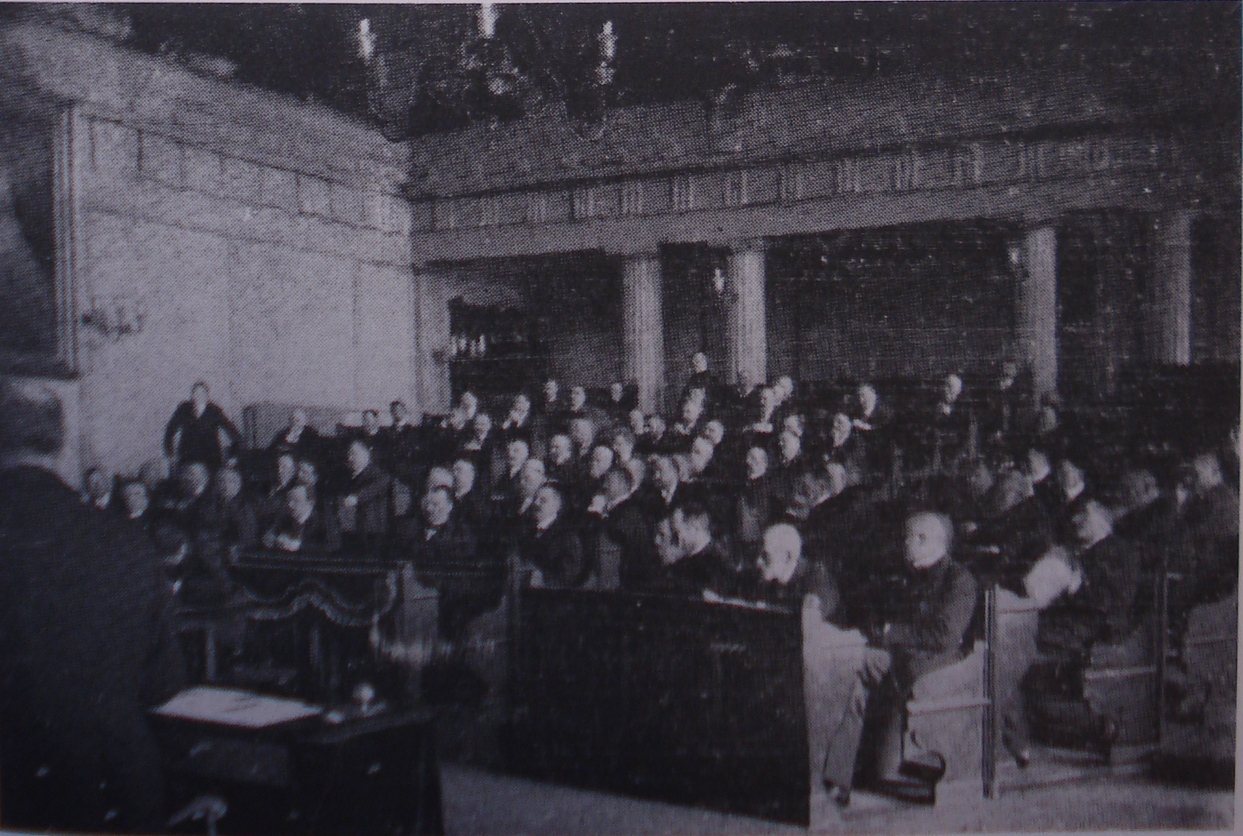
The main hall of the Croatian parliament during the session, 1914

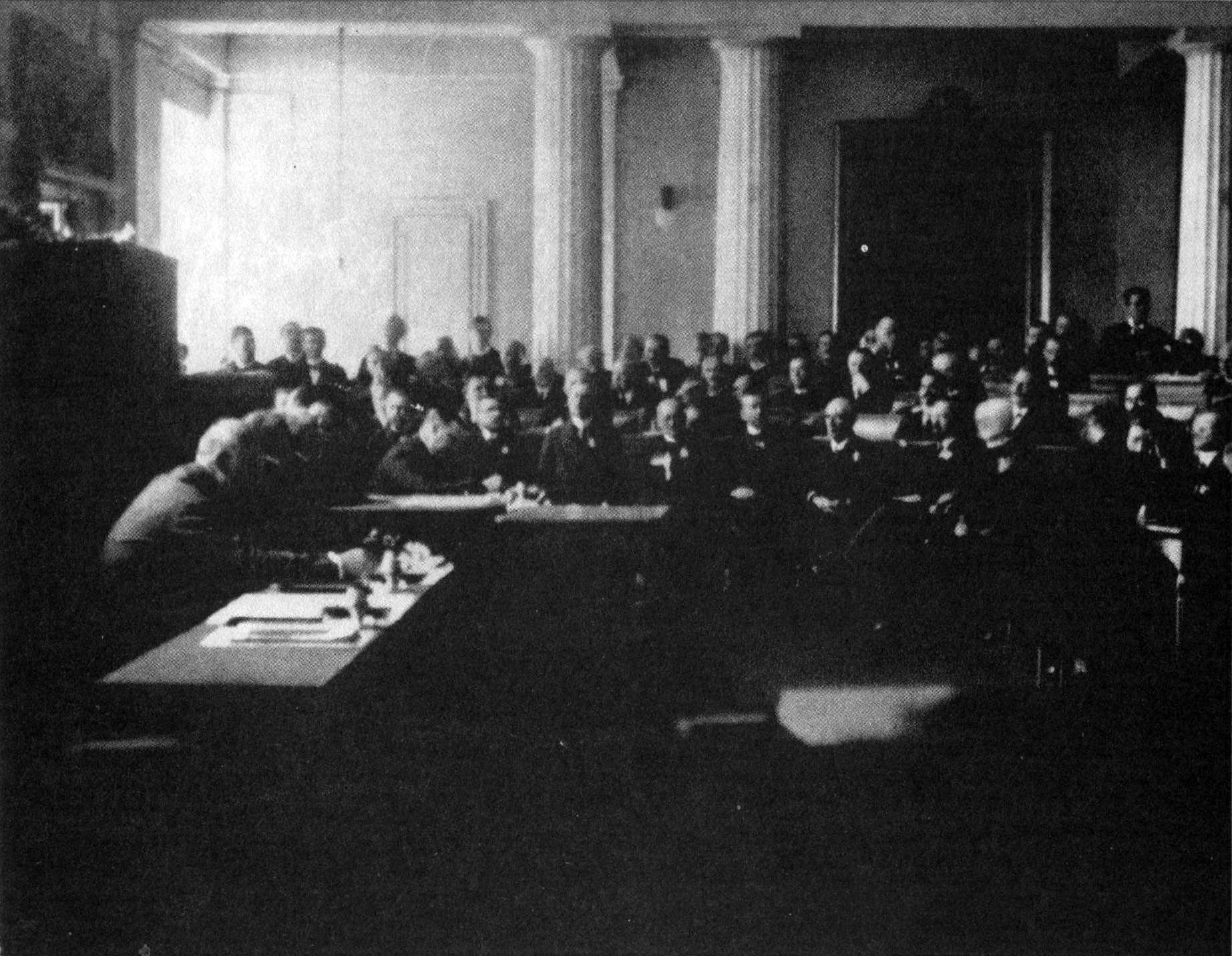
Sabor, 1918

Prior to 1737, there was no permanent place for the joint congregation, or diets, of Dalmatia, Croatia and Slavonia within the Habsburg monarchy. The nobility frequently changed places and used various administrative buildings or noble residences for this purpose. A house was finally purchased in 1731 on St. Mark's Square, next to the two-storey building formerly used by Pavao Ritter Vitezović as an official printing residence. The house was severely damaged in a fire during the same year, so a new plan was drawn up by a local builder Matija Leonhart, which envisioned a new baroque palace with a main hall suitable for diet sessions, which was first used on 6 May 1737.

=== Expansion ===
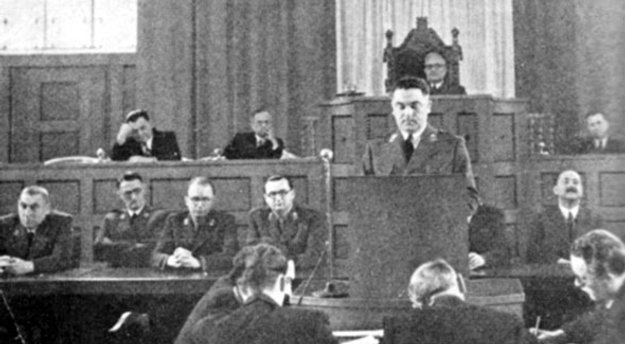
Sabor with original interior, between 1941 and 1945

From 1765, the building also took under its roof the office of the Zagreb county and the premises became more cramped over time, which gradually increased demand for more space and consequently forced temporary relocations of the sessions. So in 1807, the old building was sold by Ban of Croatia Ignác Gyulay to the Zagreb county, and a new building was purchased on the other side of the square. The building did not meet the demands of the Sabor, but became a permanent residence of the ban, called Banski Dvori. The old parliament palace was demolished, new adjacent parcels were purchased, and a new larger and more spacious building was constructed following the plans of Aleksandar Brdarić in 1849. The current building retains the floor plan of this phase, including the main hall, and sessions continued to take place there in spite of changing ownership.

=== Final phase ===
At the beginning of the 20th century, the Land Government of Dalmatia, Croatia and Slavonia purchased all of the surrounding buildings in Opatička, Kamenita and Županijska streets, which formed a single urban block together with the existing parliament building. A public tender to incorporate all of this into a single building was granted to architects Lav Kalda and Karlo Susan, and was finalised in 1911. The Zagreb County returned the new building back to the Sabor during this occasion.

=== Renovation ===
The building was damaged during the 2020 Zagreb earthquake. Following the earthquake, the Croatian Parliament agreed on a comprehensive plan to renovate the palace. The renovation includes structural, comprehensive and energy renovation, as well as the repurposing of select spaces. While construction work began in October 2024 with an initial target completion date of late 2027, unforeseen issues with the building's historic foundations and structural integrity pushed the expected completion date to mid-2028.

== Gallery ==
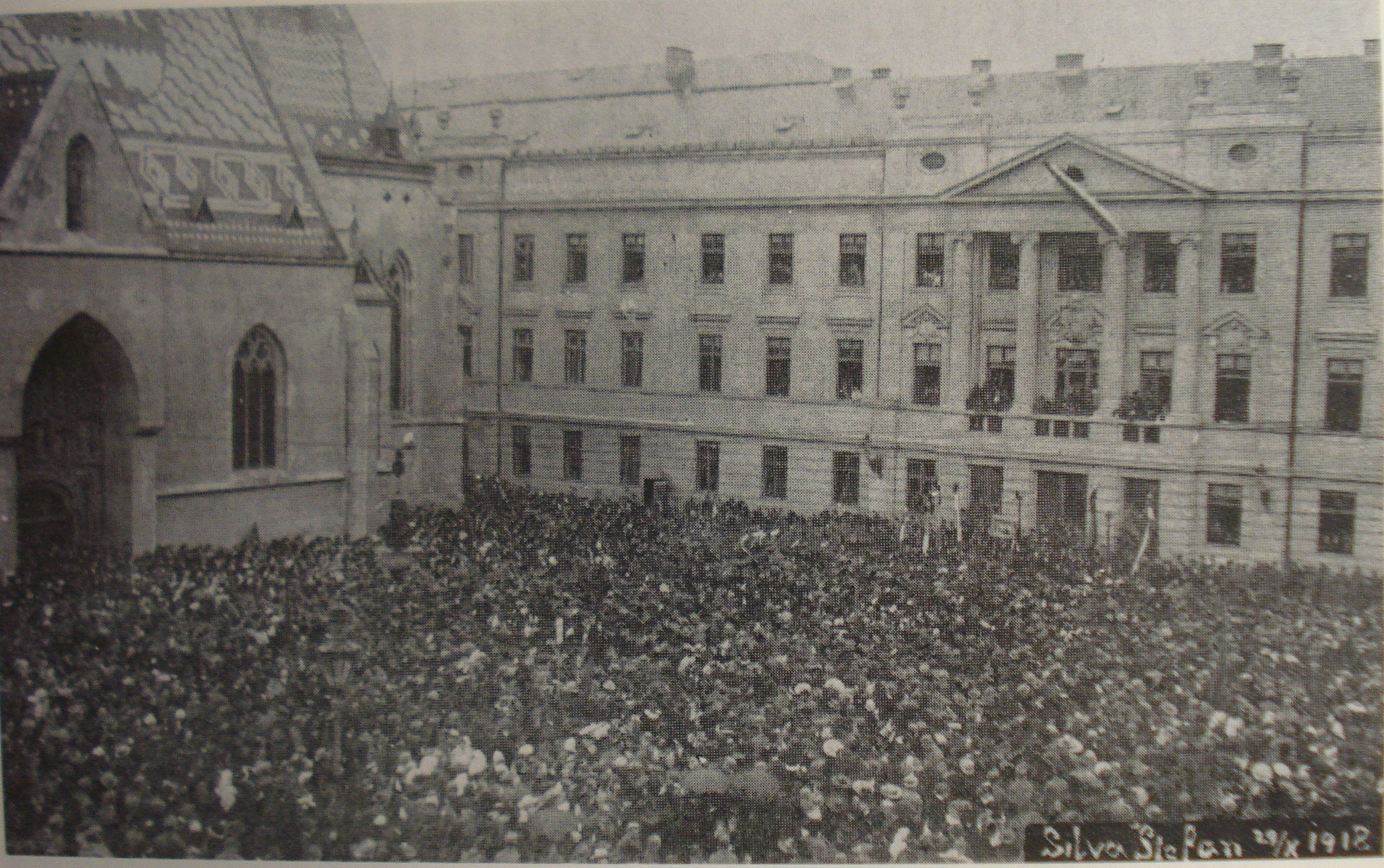
Palace in 1918, during severance of ties with old Austria-Hungary and creation of the State of Slovenes, Croats and Serbs,

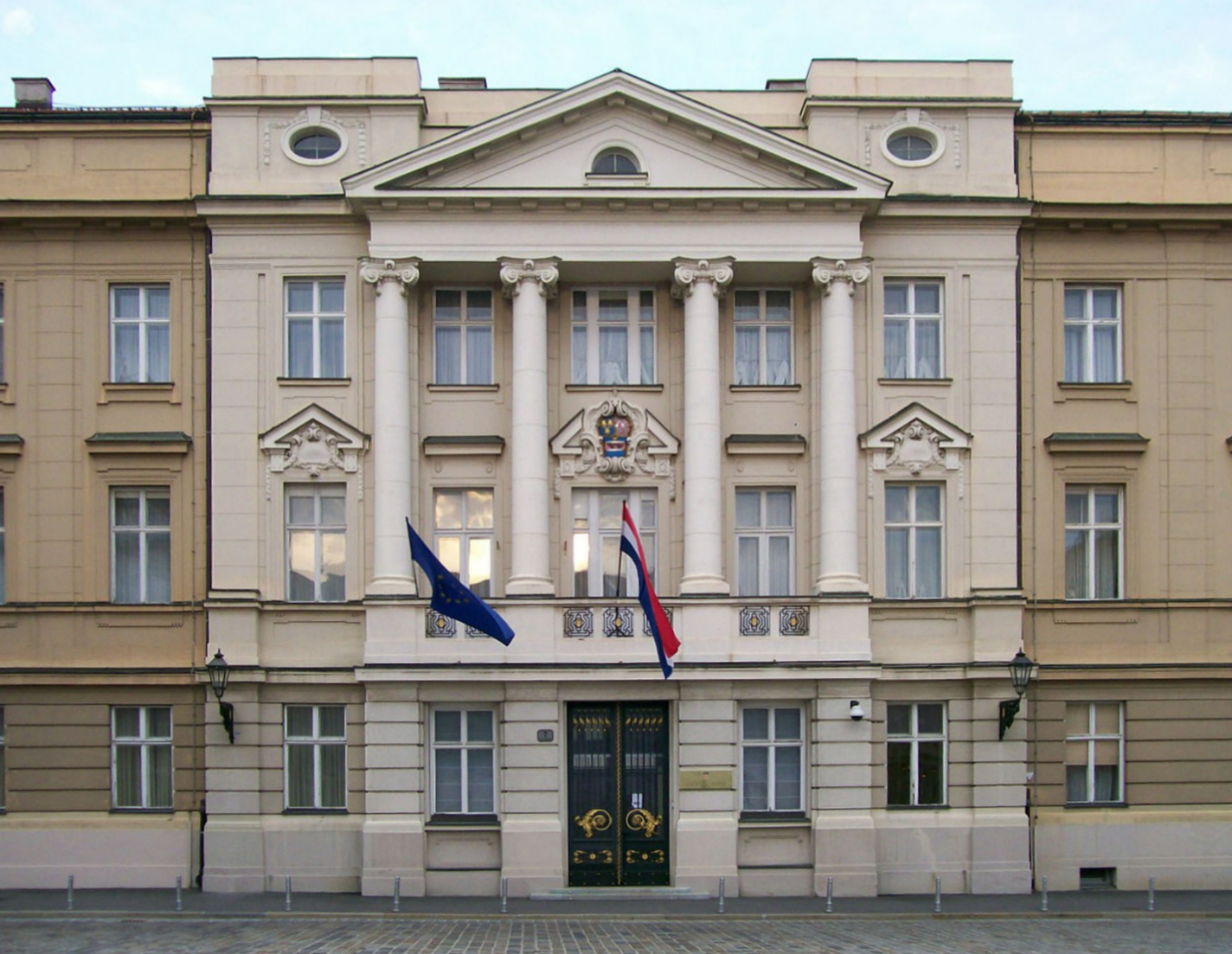
Southern entrance,

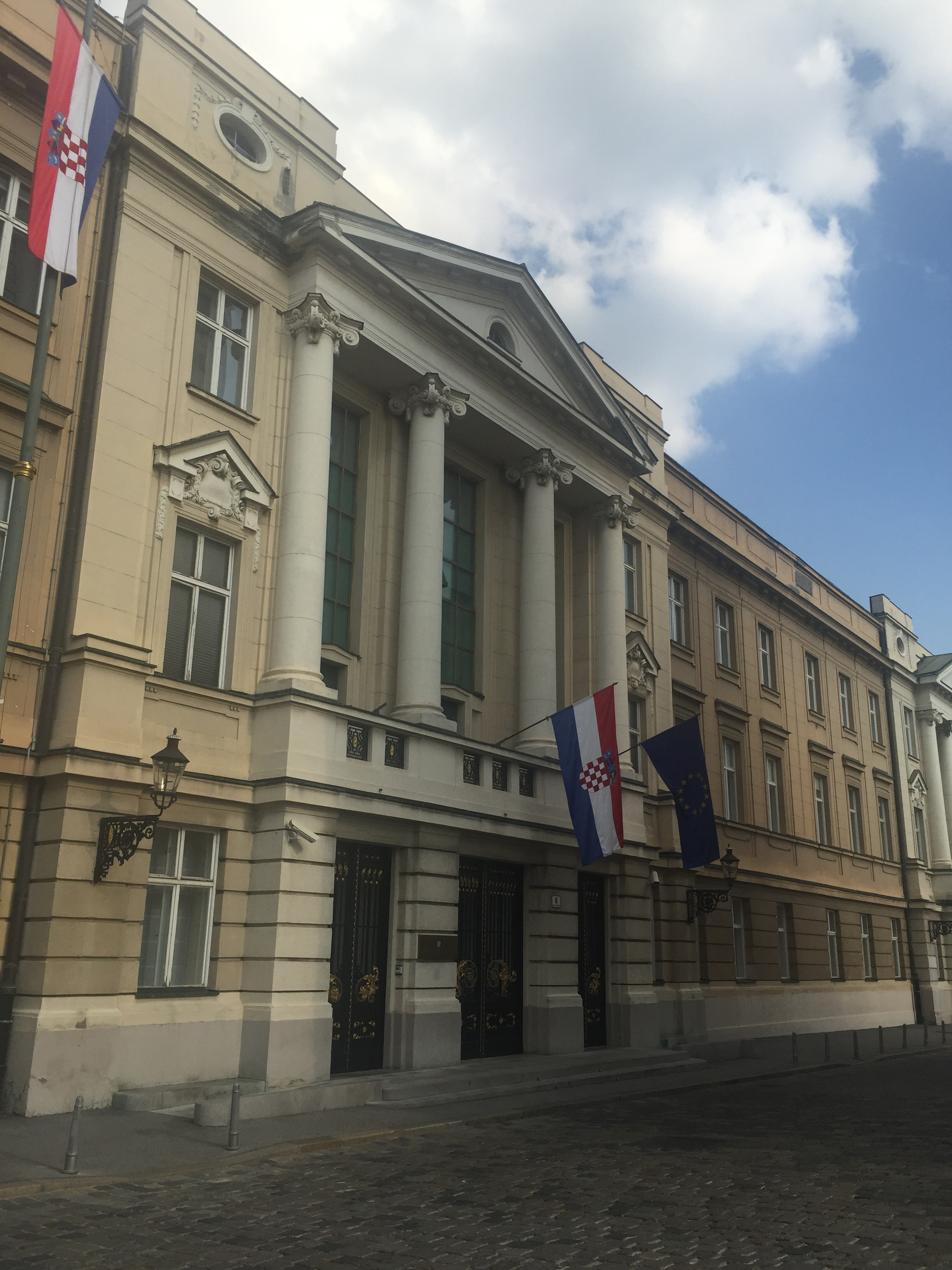
Northern entrance,

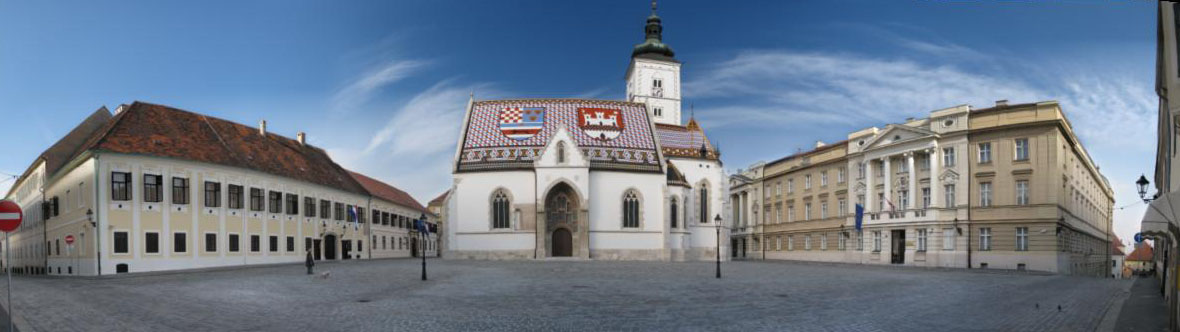
Sabor palace in St. Mark's Square,

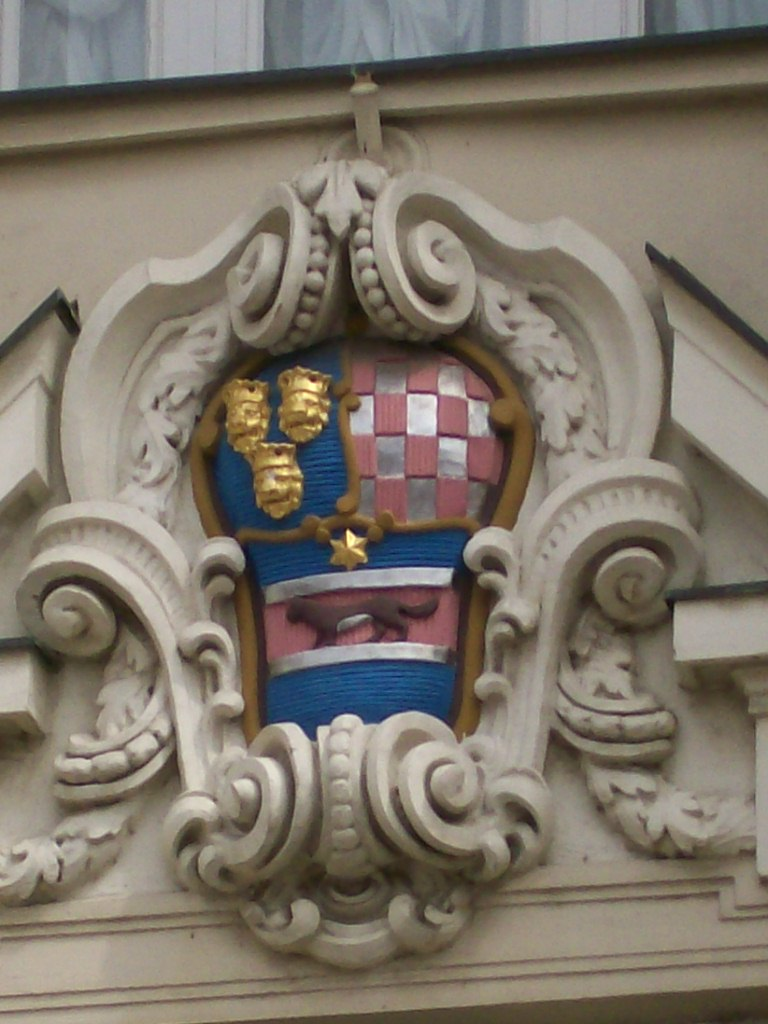
Coat of Arms detail on entrance,

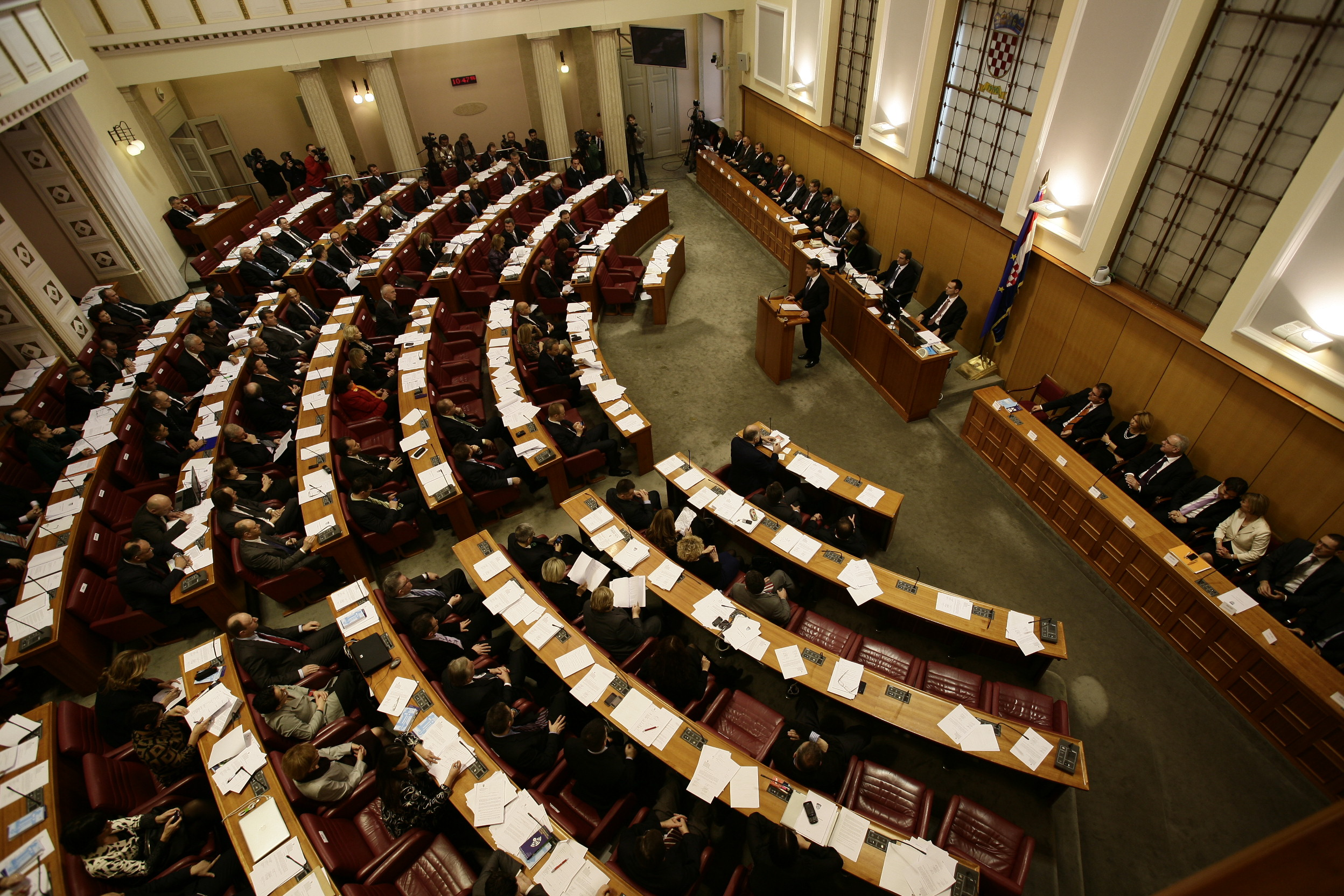
Session hall

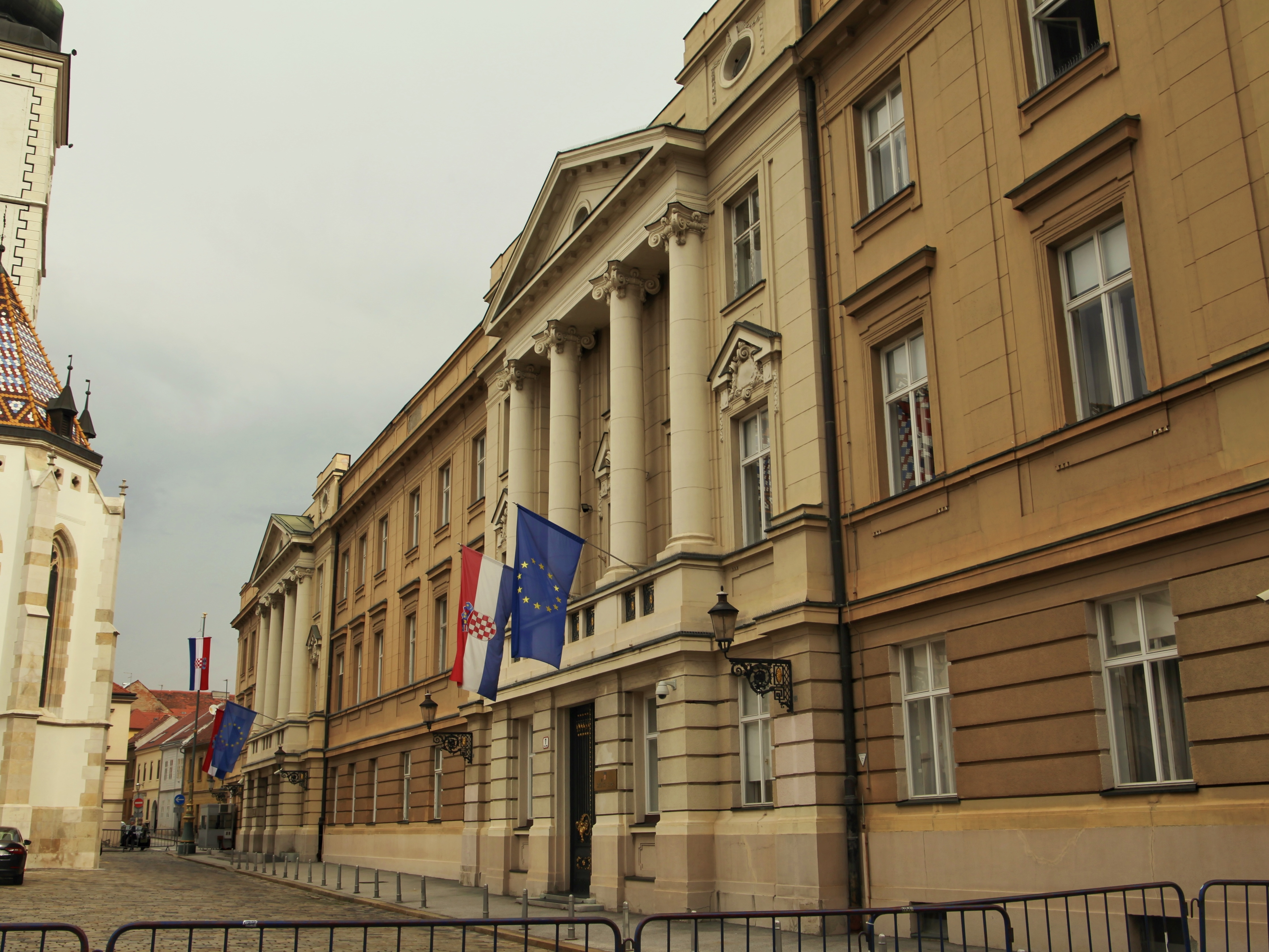
View on Sabor Palace from behind the security railings

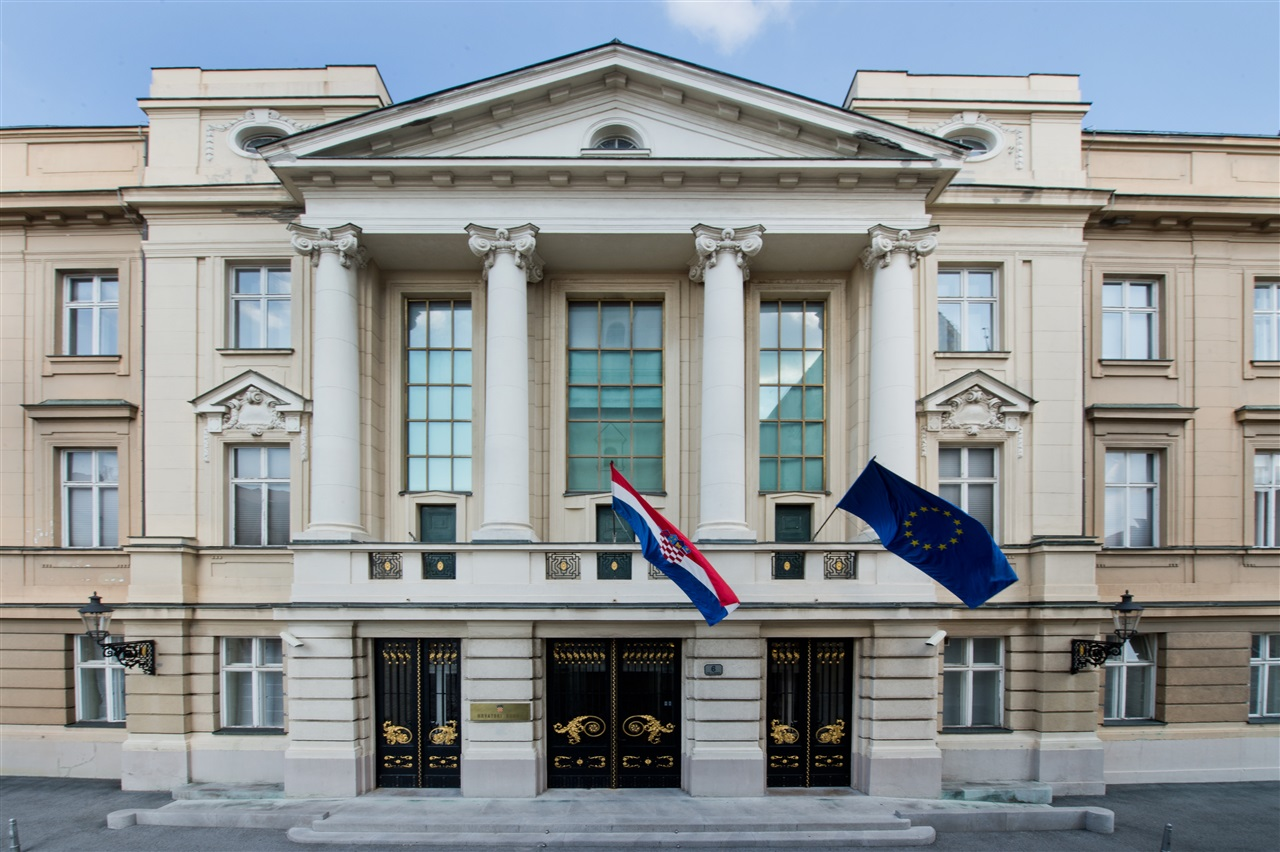
Northwestern entrance
