= Supreme Court of Croatia =

Highest court in Croatia

Supreme Court of the Republic of Croatia Vrhovni sud Republike Hrvatske
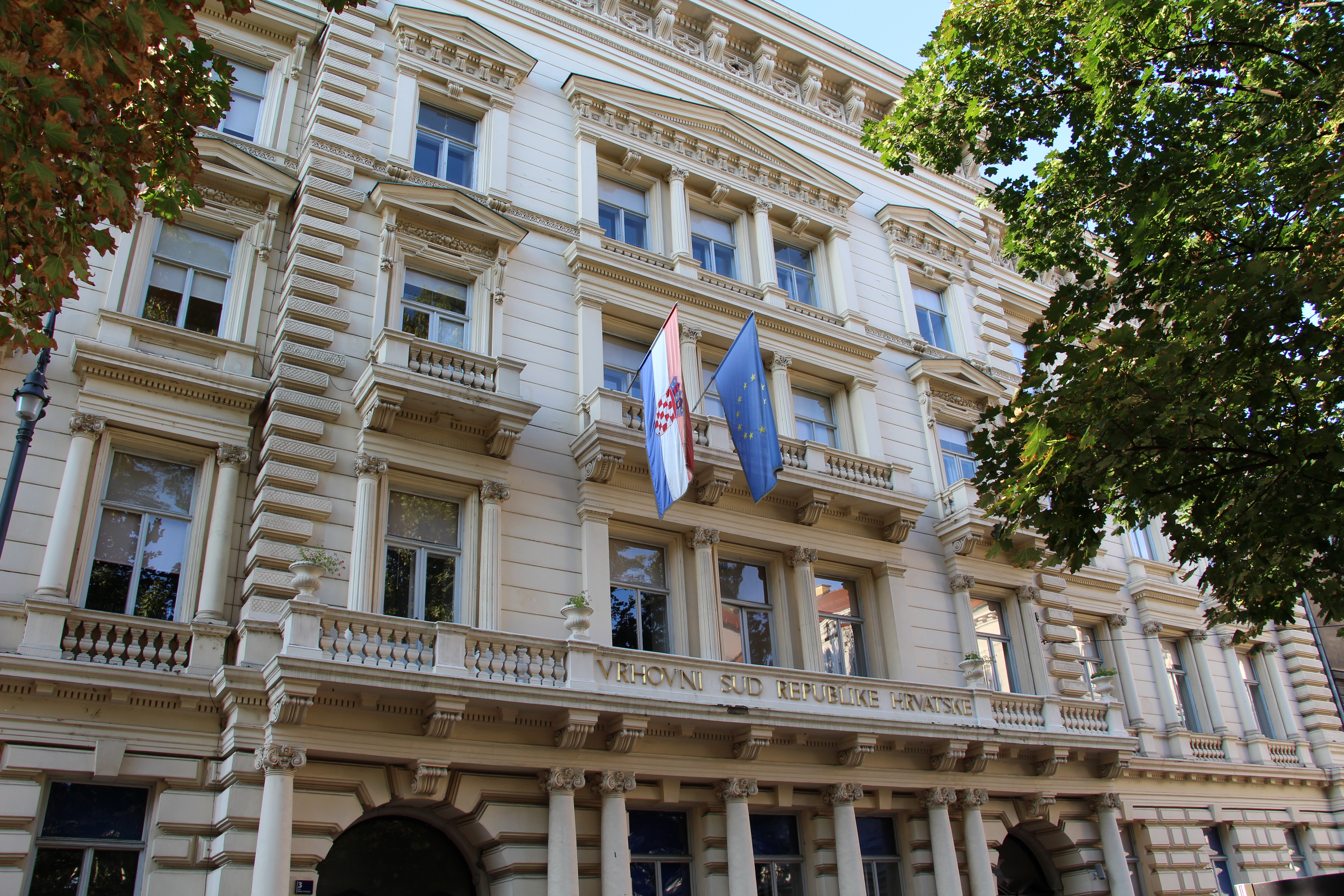
- Palace of the Supreme Court is located at the Nikola Šubić Zrinski Square
- Interactive map of Supreme Court of the Republic of Croatia; Vrhovni sud Republike Hrvatske
- 45°48′41.5″N 15°58′43.5″E
- Jurisdiction: Croatia
- Location: Zagreb
- Coordinates: 45°48′41.5″N 15°58′43.5″E
- Composition method: Elected by the State Judicial Council
- Authorised by: Constitution of the Republic of Croatia
- Judge term length: Five years in the first term, life tenure after renewal with mandatory retirement at the age of 70
- Number of positions: 43
- Website: vshr.hr

President
- Currently: Mirta Matić since 22 May 2026

The Supreme Court of the Republic of Croatia (Croatian: Vrhovni sud Republike Hrvatske) is the highest court in the country, which ensures the uniform application of laws and equal justice to all.

== Judicial system ==
Courts protect the legal order of the Republic of Croatia as established by the Constitution and law, and provide for the uniform application of law and equal justice for all.

Administration of justice in the Republic of Croatia is carried out by:

- municipal courts,
- county courts,
- commercial courts,
- administrative courts,
- the High Commercial Court of the Republic of Croatia,
- the High Administrative Court of the Republic of Croatia
- the High Misdemeanour Court of the Republic of Croatia,
- the High Criminal Court of the Republic of Croatia and
- the Supreme Court of the Republic of Croatia.

N.B. Since July 2018 (effective as of 1 January 2019) former misdemeanour courts have become specialized sections within municipal courts (2 misdemeanour courts - in Zagreb and in Split - have been retained as separate courts - the Municipal Misdemeanour Court in Zagreb and the Municipal Misdemeanour Court in Split), also former Municipal Court in Zagreb has been divided into three courts: the Municipal Civil Court in Zagreb, the Municipal Criminal Court in Zagreb and the Municipal Labour Court in Zagreb.

In early 2026, the judicial hierarchy was adjusted to handle specialized caseloads. The Varaždin County Court was granted jurisdiction over corruption and organized crime cases (USKOK cases), relieving the previous concentration of such matters in Zagreb. Furthermore, jurisdiction over consumer bankruptcy was shifted to commercial courts to improve efficiency in financial litigation.

== Powers and responsibilities ==
Supreme Court basic duties:

1. ensures the uniform application of law and equal protection of all citizens before the law,
2. discusses all important legal issues arising from the court practice
3. decides on extraordinary legal remedies against final decisions of all courts in the Republic of Croatia (cassation, criminal revision etc.),
4. hears appeals against decisions of county courts rendered in the first instance and, in special cases, hears appeals against decisions of county courts rendered in the second instance,
5. hears appeals against decisions of the High Commercial Court of the Republic of Croatia, the High Administrative Court of the Republic of Croatia, the High Misdemeanour Court of the Republic of Croatia and the High Criminal Court of the Republic of Croatia, and any other court when specified so by the law,
6. decides on the conflict of jurisdiction between the courts in the territory of the Republic of Croatia when they have the same immediately superiour court,
7. provides for the professional development of judges.

In 2026, following amendments to the Courts Act, the Supreme Court's procedural flexibility was expanded to allow the court to sit in extended panels when prescribed by specific laws for particular legal matters, moving beyond the standard three-judge panel structure for complex cases.

Additionally, as part of the 2026 judicial efficiency package, the Supreme Court oversees a streamlined process for the protection of the right to a trial within a reasonable time. Requests are now submitted directly to the President of the court where the case is being held, with the Supreme Court serving as the final instance for appeals against such rulings to ensure uniform standards in judicial delays.

== Composition ==
The Supreme Court consists of the President and a number of judges, currently numbering 43. It is organized into two primary divisions: the Criminal Department and the Civil Department.

The President of the Supreme Court is elected and relieved of duty by the Croatian Parliament at the proposal of the President of the Republic and following a prior opinion of the Parliament's Justice Committee and the Plenary Session of the Supreme Court.

Judicial office is permanent, but exceptionally, at assuming the judicial office for the first time, judges are appointed for a five-year term. After the renewal of the appointment, judges assume their duty as permanent.

All judges are appointed by the State Judicial Council and relieves them of judicial duty, as well as decides on their disciplinary responsibility.

A judge can be relieved of judicial office upon:

1. self-request
2. becoming permanently incapacitated to perform judicial office
3. becoming unworthy of the judicial office after being sentenced for a criminal offence
4. a decision of the National Judicial Council due to the commitment of an act of serious infringement of discipline
5. when reaching 70 years of age

Furthermore, the criteria for the professional evaluation of judges were updated to emphasize the quality and quantity of judicial output, which now accounts for a higher percentage of the scoring system used by the State Judicial Council for promotions. For the President of the Supreme Court, new provisions specify that an confirmed indictment for a criminal offense that renders the individual "unworthy of duty" is grounds for immediate dismissal by the Parliament.

== Digitalization and Transparency ==
Following the 2025 implementation of the automated ANON system, all final decisions of the Supreme Court are automatically anonymized and published on a centralized public portal. This reform, finalized in early 2026, aimed to eliminate the backlog of unpublished rulings and ensure full transparency of judicial practice. The court has also integrated its "e-File" system with broader EU judicial networks to facilitate faster cross-border legal cooperation.

== Presidents of the Supreme Court ==
No.	Portrait	Full name (Lifespan)	Term began	Term ended	Notes
1		Vjekoslav Vidović (1919–2006)	12 December 1990	14 February 1992	Went into mandatory retirement after a partial term of office.
2		Zlatko Crnić (1940–1992)	29 March 1992	29 September 1992	Died in office.
3		Milan Vuković (1933–2018)	1 December 1992	3 May 1995	First partial term. Elected as a judge of the Constitutional Court.
4		Krunislav Olujić (1952–)	26 May 1995	19 February 1997	One partial term. Relieved from office by a disciplinary decision of the State Judicial Council.
5		Milan Vuković (1933–2018)	28 February 1997	25 February 1999	Second partial term. Re-elected as a judge of the Constitutional Court.
6		Marijan Ramušćak (1938–)	10 March 1999	15 February 2001	One partial term. Resigned at his own request during the period of judicial reforms in 2001.
7		Ivica Crnić (1951–)	15 May 2001	15 May 2005	One full term. Did not seek reelection.
8		Branko Hrvatin (1959–)	19 July 2005	19 July 2017	Three full terms.
9		Đuro Sessa (1957–)	20 July 2017	20 July 2021	One full term. Did not seek reelection.
10		Radovan Dobronić (1960–2025)	18 October 2021	8 March 2025	Died in office.
–		Gordana Jalšovečki (1959–)	10 March 2025	22 May 2026	Judge authorized to perform court administration tasks of the Supreme Court of the Republic of Croatia.
11		Mirta Matić (1968–)	22 May 2026	Incumbent	Serving first term as President.
