= State Judicial Council (Croatia) =

Body responsible for appointing judges in Croatia

State Judicial Council Državno sudbeno vijeće

Overview
- Type: National council of the judiciary
- Jurisdiction: Croatia
- Location: Ulica grada Vukovara 49, Zagreb, Croatia
- Number of positions: 11
- Budget: €440,262 (2025 plan)
- Website: drzavnosudbenovijece.hr

President
- Currently: Darko Milković since 2 March 2023

Vice President
- Currently: Marina Paulić since 2 March 2023

The State Judicial Council or DSV (Croatian: Državno sudbeno vijeće) is the national council of the judiciary of Croatia. It ensures the autonomy and independence of the judicial branch in the Republic of Croatia by autonomously deciding on the appointment, promotion, transfer, dismissal and disciplinary accountability of judges and presiding judges.

== Members and President of the Council ==
The Council has 11 members; 7 judges, 2 university professors of law and 2 members of the Croatian Parliament (one from opposition).

Seven Council members have to be judges, as required by the Croatian Constitution, in order to ensure representation of all Croatian courts with regard to their type and rank. Candidates are being elected by all judges based on proposal of the special Commission on the Election of Judges to DSV. Presidents of courts cannot be elected as members of the DSV. Council members from the ranks of judges are:

- two judges of the Supreme Court of Croatia,
- three judges of the county court,
- one judge of the municipal court,
- one judge of the specialized court.

Two members of the DSV are university professors of law elected on the basis of the proposals by the session of deans of four Croatian law schools.

Two members are elected by the Croatian Parliament, one of whom must be from opposition parties. Representatives of executive power, nor representatives of other state bodies and citizens' associations cannot be elected to the DSV.

Members of the DSV are elected for a term of four years, while no one may serve more than two terms. Before taking office, members must take an oath. President of the DSV is elected internally by secret ballot by the majority of members of the DSV for a period of two years. The president and members of the DSV have immunity. This means that they cannot be held accountable for the expressed opinion or vote in the Council, nor anyone can initiate criminal proceedings against them without the approval of the Council.

Duties of the DSV member ends with the expiry of the mandate, if dismissed unjustifiably, due to the inability to perform the duty, if appointed president of the court, if permanently incapacitated to perform duty, if sentenced to imprisonment, if receives a citizenship of another country and if requested by the member himself.

== The scope of work ==
The scope of the Council includes:

- appointment of judges,
- appointment and dismissal of court presidents,
- transfer of judges,
- conducting disciplinary proceedings and deciding on disciplinary responsibility of judges,
- deciding on dismissal of judges,
- participation in training of judges and judicial officers,
- conducting the registration of candidates to the State School for Judicial Officials and the process of taking final exams,
- adoption of methodologies for evaluating judges,
- keeping records of judges,
- management and control of assets declarations of judges.

The Council makes decisions in a session convened by the President, or exceptionally, in a session convened at the proposal of at least five members.

== The procedure of appointing judges ==
At first, Ministry of Justice advertises job vacancy in Narodne novine, ex officio or at the proposal of the President of the Court to which the judge is to be appointed, the president of the immediately higher court or the president of the Supreme Court. After collecting opinions, the Ministry submits the list of candidates eligible for judgeship to the Council. Council is obligated to obtain the opinion of the authorized committee of the Croatian Parliament during the appointment process.

== Disciplinary proceedings ==
The judge is accountable for committing disciplinary offenses which are:

- abuse of position or exceeding official authority,
- unjustified failure to perform judicial duties,
- the behavior incompatible with judicial office,
- causing disturbances in the work of the court, which significantly affect the functioning of the judiciary,
- violation of official secrets in connection with a judicial function,
- damage to the reputation of the court or judicial office in some other way.

Disciplinary proceedings are particularly initiated if the judge fails to develop and deliver judicial decisions within the legal deadline, if the judicial council evaluated his work with a negative grade and if, without reasonable cause, the number of decisions made by the judge in one year is below average.

Penalties for committed disciplinary offenses are:

- reprimand,
- fine of up to one third of the salary earned in the previous month for a maximum of six months,
- dismissal from office.

The disciplinary proceedings in the first instance is decided by the Council by a majority vote of all members. The request to initiate disciplinary proceedings against a judge for which there is a suspicion of having committed a disciplinary offense is initiated by the court president in which judge is employed. A request for proceedings for committing a disciplinary offense may also be submitted directly to the president of the higher court, the President of the Supreme Court, the Council and the Minister of Justice.

The judge against whom disciplinary proceedings was initiated is allowed to defend himself in person or through lawyer. Judge has the right to appeal to the Constitutional Court against the decision of the Council.
