= 1997 Croatian presidential election =

← 1992	15 June 1997	2000 →
- Turnout: 54.62%
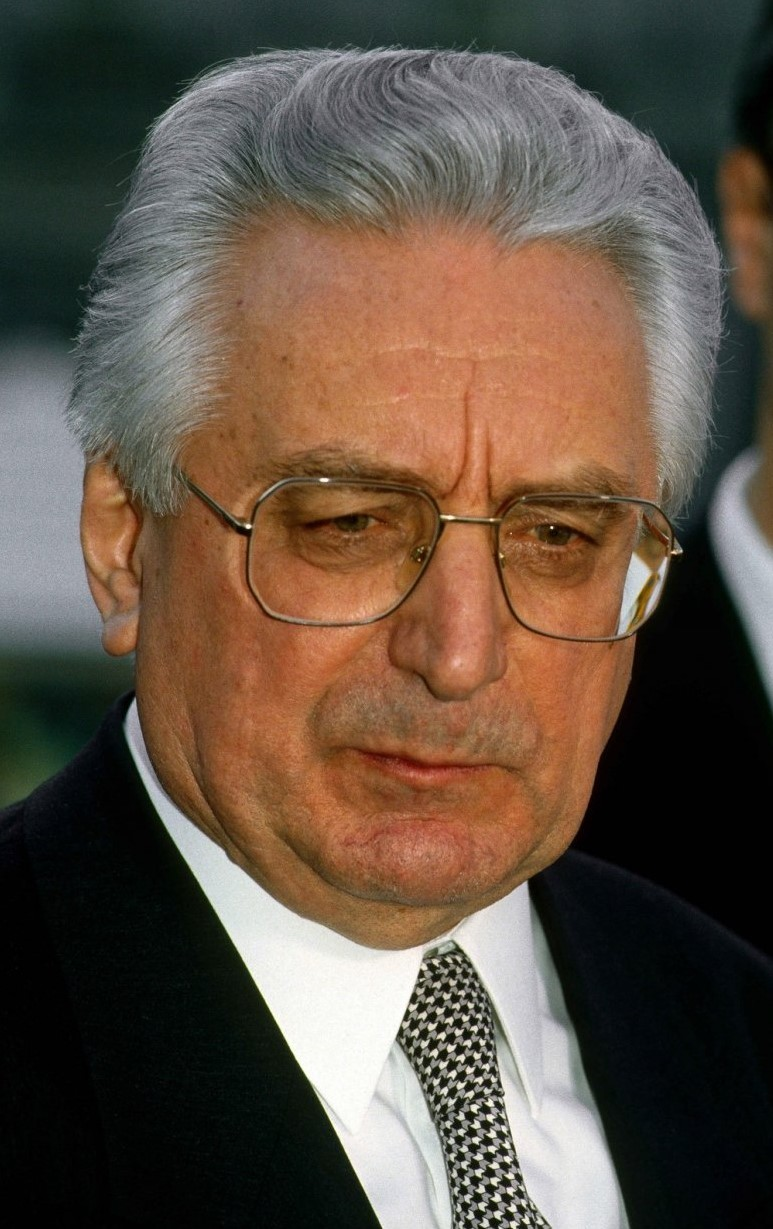

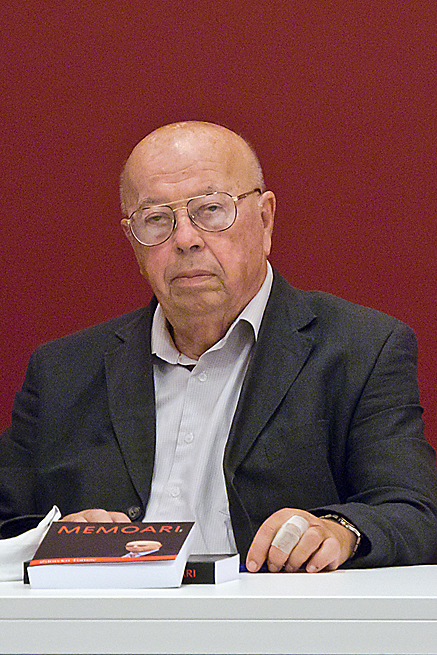

Nominee	Franjo Tuđman	Zdravko Tomac	Vlado Gotovac
Party	HDZ	SDP	HSLS
Popular vote	1,337,990	458,172	382,630
Percentage	61.41%	21.03%	17.56%
President before election
Franjo Tuđman
HDZ
Elected President
Franjo Tuđman
HDZ

Presidential elections were held in Croatia on 15 June 1997. They were the second presidential elections held since independence in 1991. The result was a victory for incumbent president Franjo Tuđman, the leader of the Croatian Democratic Union party (HDZ), who received 61.40% of the vote and was re-elected to a second five-year term. As Tuđman received a majority of the valid votes cast on election day there was no need for a run-off. President Tuđman received a plurality of the votes in 20 of Croatia's 21 counties, while Vlado Gotovac did so in Istria County.

Voter turnout in the election was 54.62%, which was a large decline from the 74.9% turnout registered five years previous. Furthermore, about 459.000 fewer votes were cast in comparison to the previous election in 1992. The elections also featured the smallest number of presidential candidates to date, with only three taking part: Franjo Tuđman, Zdravko Tomac and Vlado Gotovac. The margin of victory (over 40%) is also the largest in any election to date.

OSCE delegation observing the elections concluded that "the process leading up to the election was fundamentally flawed, and did not meet the minimum standards for a meaningful and democratic election in line with OSCE standards."

== Background ==
On February 22, the incumbent president Tudman was re-nominated by his party HDZ to seek a re-election bid.

In April, two months earlier, local elections and elections for the upper chamber of the parliament were held. Local elections showed weakening of HDZ position in urban centers. The aftermath of Zagreb crisis and the protests against silencing Radio 101, an independent and critical media outlet, additionally led to a drop of government approval. It was also widely rumoured that 75-year-old president Tudman is suffering from cancer and his health was a major topic of speculation.

Political parties in opposition to the ruling HDZ pondered agreeing on a single candidate to challenge Tudman. Scholar Ivan Supek was mentioned, but nothing came out of it. SDP and HNS toyed with the idea to jointly support HSLS candidate, poet and philosopher, MP Vlado Gotovac, but SDP ended up supporting Tomac's bid. The rift in the united opposition was evident during the local elections earlier in the year, when HSS and HSLS distanced themselves from SDP. According to journalist Vlado Vurusic, SDP's Tomac chose to run knowing he stood little chance in order to legitimize the elections and build further visibility for the opposition. Analysts believed that opposition's goal was to at least secure a run-off, preventing an absolute majority in the first round.

Before the start of the official campaign, president Tudman's 75th birthday on 14 May was lavishly celebrated in Croatian National Theatre in Zagreb, culminating with a three-hour play showing his presidency as a peak of Croatian national history. Croatian National Bank minted a commemorative coin, while Croatian Post issued a stamp celebrating his birthday. State television broadcast an extensive multi-part documentary about Tudjman's life as well. In a state-funded campaign, charity concert "All Croatian Victories for Vukovar" was promoted throughout the country with billboards and posters depicting the president.

There were further concerns regarding access to polls. According to the OSCE, "as many as 300,000 lifelong (primarily ethnic Serb) residents who fled the country" during the 1991–95 war were disenfranchised, facing severe political, legal and administrative hurdles preventing them from voting. On the other hand, approximately 330,000 Bosnian Croats were given the vote due to their Croatian citizenship. Citizens living in the eastern Slavonia, formerly Serb rebel-held areas and under UN administration at the time, were to vote for the first time in national elections. They had already voted in local elections in April.

== Candidates ==
Candidate	Party affiliation	Political remarks
Franjo Tudman	Croatian Democratic Union	Incumbent President of Croatia since 1990. Tudman won the presidential elections in 1992 and was standing a re-election bid for his last term in the office, as limited by the constitution. He was re-nominated by his party HDZ on February 22. At the time he was also party chairman. Tudman ran on a centre-right platform of continuity, boasting success in ending the war in Croatia with a military victory in 1995, peace settlement in Bosnia and Herzegovina, and peaceful re-integration of secessionist Serb-occupied Eastern Slavonia, including Vukovar.
Vlado Gotovac	Croatian Social Liberal Party	A member of Sabor, writer, philosopher and a poet, Gotovac was HSLS party chairman at the time. Endorsed by HNS, HSS, IDS, IDF, DA, ASD, ZZ, and SDA-Croatia. Dražen Budiša, HSLS chairman hopeful and his opponent, did not publicly support him. Gotovac campaigned on improving civil liberties, depoliticizing state affairs, strengthening local self-government, alleviation of poverty, and reducing then-hefty presidential powers. His ads played the tune of European anthem, promoting the Eurointegration agenda.
Zdravko Tomac	Social Democratic Party	A member of Sabor, candidate of the centre-left Social Democratic Party (SDP) and party vice-chairman. Former Deputy Prime Minister of Croatia in war-time national unity government (1991-2). Tomac campaigned on social justice issues and income inequality topics, pledging to continue with his humble lifestyle if elected president. He pointed out Olof Palme as his role model.

=== Failed candidacies ===
- Dobroslav Paraga, chairman of HSP-1861, gathered just 8,462 signatures supporting his bid, thus failing to reach 10,000 hurdle.

== Campaign ==
Tudman officially launched his campaign on 28 May, presenting his manifesto at a reception in Klovićevi Dvori Gallery in Zagreb. On 30 May, Statehood Day, a military parade was organized along Jarun lake in Zagreb, prominently featuring Tudman as the commander-in-chief. At an estimated cost of 16 million DEM, parade's exact purpose was questioned by media. HDZ campaign committee published an election manifesto in all daily newspapers including a list of 800 public personas and celebrities officially supporting Tudman's re-election bid. However, several of the listed were under-age, while a number of artists and celebrities listed afterwards issued a public rebuttal, stating that they were never consulted on the matter. The list included public broadcaster director as well.

On 8 June president Tudjman visited Vukovar and eastern Slavonia for the second time. The area was previously occupied by rebel ethnic Serb authorities and was under the transitional authority of United Nations' administration at the time. Peaceful local elections took place throughout the region in April and gradual reintegration in Croatia was going according to plan and scheduled to be completed in 1998. Now, however, Tudjman visited Vukovar in a 21-car railway composition dubbed "The Peace Train", bringing many politicians, dignitaries and celebrities with him and stopping for whistle-stop rallies on his way from Zagreb. In a Zagreb whistle-stop rally, he viciously attacked the opposition in general as "a handful of sold-out Judas' sons." Holding a conciliatory speech in Vukovar, Tudman fostered responsibility, cooperation and reconciliation between Croats and ethnic Serbs. However, he explicitly rejected the return of all Serb refugees to Croatia. All of these events were given significant coverage by state-owned media, which virtually avoided any display of (or news on) other candidates and opposition's activities, campaign, etc. Croatian Television was also criticized for a particularly slanted approach, heavily promoting Tudman. HDZ ran a fierce defamation campaign against Tomac and Gotovac.

With unemployment running at 17%, Tomac and Gotovac campaigned against nepotism, corruption, and economic inequality, also attacking Tudman's authoritarianism and politicization of army, police, and public broadcaster. Tudman dismissed the unemployment figures, claiming that only 9% were "actually" unemployed. Tomac's slogan was "a president with neither Brijuni nor the [presidential] plane", hinting at the high-end Tudman's lifestyle and the cost of the president's office and his Brijuni summer residence. While Tomac promoted social justice, addressing people depending on wages not capital income, and spoke about labour-capital conflict, Gotovac was more focused on civil liberties. They both advocated changing the constitution and transitioning towards full parliamentary democracy and curtailing presidential powers.

Tudman believed not to be on par with the other two candidates, thus dismissing interviews and press statements as unnecessary and unworthy of his position. (he did give a pre-arranged interview, broadcast on public TV). As a consequence, his deputy head of staff, Vesna Škare-Ožbolt, answered many questions in his name without Tudman's knowledge. No debates were held.

Access to marketing and campaign funding was severely unequal; Tudman's ads on TV ran for more than 2,000 seconds during the last week of the campaign, while Gotovac and Tomac combined had a total of 101 seconds. Gotovac and Tomac's posters and billboards were virtually absent from sight. Furthermore, Tomac's campaign van was stoned near Zadar.

=== Pula incident ===
External videos
- HRT's footage of assault on Gotovac in Pula, Twitter video

On 5 June opposition candidate Vlado Gotovac (HSLS) was physically attacked during his rally in Pula by Croatian Army captain Tomislav Brzović of the elite 1st Guards Corps, who wore dress uniform. The attacker hit him in the head with his belt, shouting "I am an ustasha, long live Ante Pavelić!", later threatening to kill everyone present. Gotovac suffered a concussion and was hospitalised for four days. Having to suspend his activities for further 10 days, the opposition jointly - albeit unsuccessfully - petitioned the electoral commission to suspend the campaign altogether until Gotovac recovers. Captain Brzovic was suspended for several months from active duty and received a conditional sentence, but was not ultimately discharged from army and resumed his commissioned duties. President Tudman neither reached out to Gotovac nor condemned the attack, even going as far as calling opposition candidates "headless" and "confused" in Vukovar.

== Opinion polls ==
Date	Pollster	Tuđman	Tomac	Gotovac	Undecided	Refused to reply
4/5 June	Metron	56,3	10,1	6,2	12,1	15,3

== Results ==
Tomac and Gotovac fared better in cities, with Gotovac coming second in Split (32%-21%) and narrowly third in Rijeka.

Candidate	Party	Votes	%
Franjo Tuđman	Croatian Democratic Union	1,337,990	61.41
Zdravko Tomac	Social Democratic Party of Croatia	458,172	21.03
Vlado Gotovac	Croatian Social Liberal Party	382,630	17.56
Total		2,178,792	100.00
Valid votes		2,178,792	98.21
Invalid/blank votes		39,656	1.79
Total votes		2,218,448	100.00
Registered voters/turnout		4,061,479	54.62
Source: Nohlen & Stöver; State Election Committee

Out of 377,705 citizens living abroad eligible to vote, 88,728 (23.5%) eventually did so, predominantly in Bosnia and Herzegovina (48 thousand out of 140,742 eligible to vote) and Germany (23 thousand). In total, 81,107 (91.4%) voted for Tudman, 2,676 for Tomac, and 4,463 for Gotovac.

Voter turnout was fairly low in Eastern Slavonia, then under UN administration and with an ethnic Serb majority. UNTAES complained that Croatian authorities did not update voting records in time, which left some 10% of those who did turn out to cast a ballot without a vote. Voter turnout was also low in some opposition-friendly regions; for instance, in Krapina-Zagorje county it stood around 40%. Turnout was highest in Pozega-Slavonia County (51,38%), while Zadar county reported lowest figures - just 34,5%.

=== Maps ===
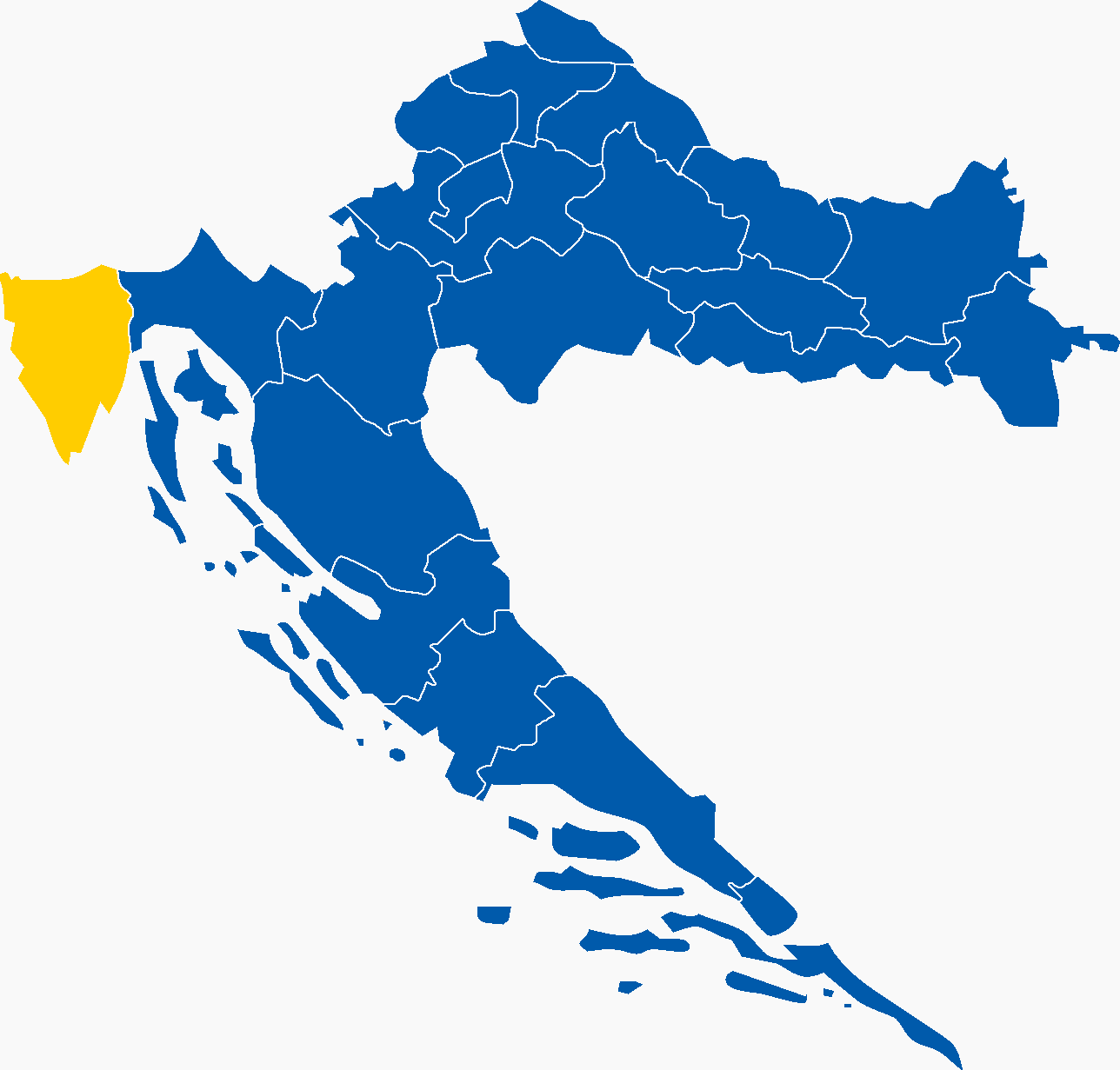
Results in all of Croatia's counties: the candidate with the majority of votes in each administrative division. Franjo Tuđman Zdravko Tomac Vlado Gotovac

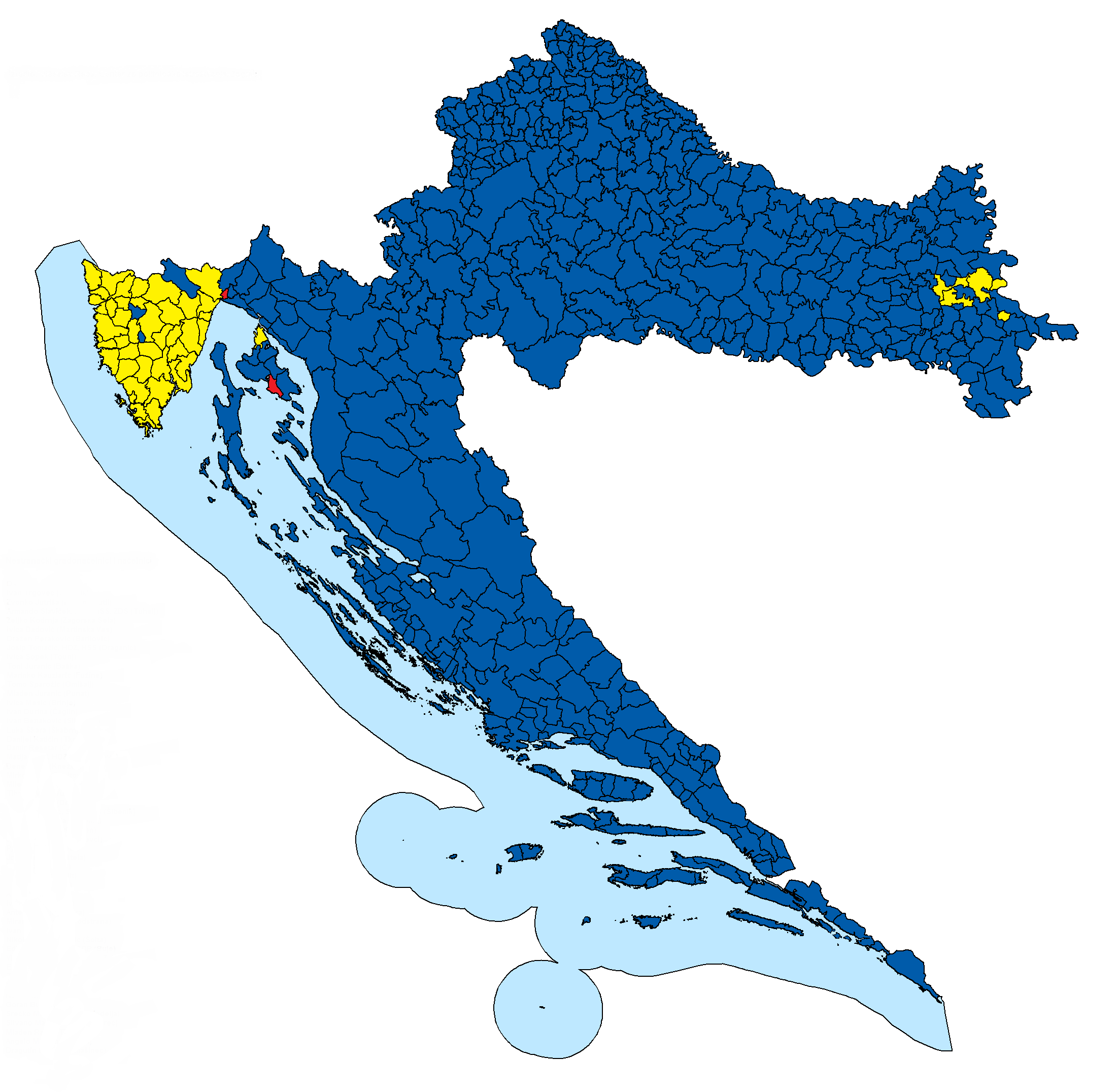
Results of the election based on the majority of votes in each municipality of Croatia

== Aftermath ==
External videos
- Croatia: Zagreb: President Tudjman is heading towards victory, AP Archives (YouTube video)
- Tudman's inauguration, AP Archives (YouTube video)

U.S. Senator Paul Simon, special OSCE coordinator for monitoring the elections, reported that "Croatia has experienced a free but not fair election. While candidates were able to speak freely, the process leading up to the election was fundamentally flawed. It did not meet the minimum standards for democracies. By contrast the election itself was - with some exceptions - conducted efficiently."

HDZ fell short of its proclaimed 70% vote target, but still celebrated with fireworks and an open-air party in Zagreb. Government-friendly Vjesnik commented that the electorate had rejected political experiments, opting for continuity. Tuđman took the oath of office for a second term on 5 August 1997 at Saint Mark's Square. He chose the inauguration date to coincide with the anniversary of the military operation "Storm" that ended the war in Croatia two years earlier. Croatian jurist and constitutional expert, Branko Smerdel, in 2000 opined that the 1997 elections saw a transition from Tudman's "imperial war-time presidency" to "an elective monarchy", as Tudman afterwards hoarded power in his various councils, advisory bodies and committees. However, he served only a little more than two years of his new 5-year term, as he died on 10 December 1999, triggering early elections being called for January 2000. Vlatko Pavletić assumed the post of Acting President as the Speaker of the Croatian Parliament.

SDP's result as runners-up, prevailing over HSLS, was important in establishing them as a leading opposition party and a senior partner in building the coalition (August 1998) that eventually won the 2000 parliamentary elections and formed the first post-HDZ government. SDP showed further growth continuity in the polls and stabilized its vote share. In 1998, SDP chairman Ivica Račan was far ahead of president Tudman in popularity polls. In 1998, HDZ could not form a majority in two counties (Primorje-Gorski Kotar and Dubrovnik-Neretva) and was forced to call the elections, which were won by the united opposition.

Gotovac was disappointed with his result and the "lack of a political centre in Croatia," warning against "bi-polarization" of Croatian politics. His 17% vote share as a candidate of several largest opposition parties in Sabor showed their loss of credibility as an alternative. Much lower turnout than at both April local elections (70%) and previous presidential elections in 1992 was seen by some as a sign of voter apathy and their perception of the unfairness of the electoral process, but also as a loss of credibility in HSS, HSLS and HNS, whose councilors frequently crossed the floor after the elections, thus enabling HDZ to form the majority in several cities and counties despite their failure to achieve so at the ballot. Gotovac's failure to beat Tomac was a trigger for an intra-party clash in HSLS, exposing the rift between more nationalist-friendly Budisa (who flirted with HDZ during local elections) and Zagreb party organization on one side and Gotovac on the other. Budisa was elected party chairman, while Gotovac left the party, forming a splinter Liberal Party in January 1998.

According to political scientist Trevor Waters, after the elections "support for Tudjman and the HDZ fell sharply amid widespread allegations of corruption, cronyism and nepotism, particularly with regard to the privatisation of state-owned assets." Fractional in-fighting amongst HDZ became apparent as the united opposition started rising in the opinion polls.
