= Dalmatian Action (2021) =

Dalmatian Action Dalmatinska akcija
- Abbreviation: DA
- President: Nino Aviani
- Founders: Nino Aviani; Damir Šalov; Srđan Benzon
- Founded: 16 December 2021
- Headquarters: Pod Kosom 35b Split
- Ideology: Regionalism; Ecosocialism
- Political position: Left
- Colours: Blue

Party flag

Website
- dalmatinska-akcija.webnode.hr

The Dalmatian Action (Croatian: Dalmatinska akcija, lit. 'Dalmatian Action', DA) is a minor regional political party in Croatia. Dalmatian Action, or DA, is a regionalist and autonomist party in the region of Dalmatia within Croatia, which advocates the political autonomy of Dalmatia within Croatia, including the creation of a Dalmatian regional government with a legislative assembly, with autonomy over cultural matters concerning Dalmatia.

It was reactivated on December 16, 2021. New Dalmatian Action took its name from the deleted Dalmatian Action from the 1990s, known for its conflict with the HDZ and then Croatian President Franjo Tuđman. That party was dissolved in 2003 by the decision of the Ministry of Justice.

== History ==
=== 1990 party ===
The Dalmatian Action or (DA) was a 1990s regionalist and autonomist party in Dalmatia within Croatia, which advocated political autonomy for Dalmatia within Croatia, including the creation of a Dalmatian regional government with a legislative assembly, with autonomy over cultural matters involving Dalmatia. It was founded in December 1990. During the Homeland War, Croatian President Franjo Tuđman accused the DA of being an anti-Croatian separatist organization that intends to destroy Croatia, and based on that he put its leaders in prison.

In the elections for the Croatian Parliament in 1992, she won a representative in the Croatian Parliament, but in the following elections she failed to cross the electoral threshold.

In September 1993, its headquarters in Split were blown up with explosives.

On February 20, 2003, the Ministry of Justice deleted the party from the register of political parties in Croatia.

=== New foundation ===
The current Dalmatian Action party was founded in December 2021, by former members of Social Democratic Party of Croatia after disagreements with other members in local organization in Split, Croatia.

The party was founded by Nino Aviani and Tomislav Matijašević, and Teo Krnić was appointed secretary. In the last intra-party elections, Aviani ran for president of the Split SDP, but he was excluded from the election process because his candidacy was declared invalid due to incomplete documentation. For some time, the media discussed the fights between Aviani and Split SDP members because of the way the party was run. He also accused them that, under pressure, the appeal against the decision on exclusion from the electoral process failed only on the second attempt. He announced that he would request administrative supervision of the party's work due to a deliberate failure to conduct the election process.

== See also ==
- Autonomism
- Autonomist Party (Dalmatia)
- Dalmatia
- Dalmatian Action (1990)
- Dalmatian National Party (1990)
- Dalmatianism
- Regionalism

== Bibliography ==
- Članak u Nacionalu
