= 1993 Croatian Chamber of Counties election =

7 February 1993	1997 →
- 63 of the 68 seats in the Chamber of Counties
- Turnout: 64.34%
Party	Leader	Seats
HDZ	Franjo Tuđman	37
HSLS	Dražen Budiša	16
HSS	Drago Stipac	5
IDS	Ivan Jakovčić	3
SDP	Ivica Račan	1
HNS-LD	Savka Dabčević-Kučar	1
This lists parties that won seats. See the complete results below.
Speaker after
Josip Manolić; HDZ

Chamber of Counties elections were held in Croatia for the first time on 7 February 1993. The result was a victory for the Croatian Democratic Union, which won 37 of the 63 elected seats.

== Background ==
Under the new constitution adopted in 1990, the Croatian Parliament was bicameral. The lower house had been elected in 1992 and its representatives had passed laws creating new territorial organisations of Croatia. This included counties that were to be represented by the upper house – the Chamber of Counties.

Each county elected three members, while the President had the right to appoint five members, known as "Virils". The electoral law made each county a district that was to elect three representatives on the basis of proportional representation.

In practice, the use of proportional representation in such small districts led to a single party – the Croatian Democratic Union – being grossly overrepresented because sometimes even with less than third of the votes guaranteed two of the three seats.

The elections were marked by an uncharacteristically intense campaign directed towards single region – Istria. The government of Franjo Tuđman has invested great effort to defeat the Istrian Democratic Assembly (IDS) after being concerned by the party's good result during the 1992 elections. This effort backfired, resulting in record vote for the IDS.

== Results ==
Party	Votes	%	Seats
Croatian Democratic Union	1,013,365	45.49	37
Croatian Social Liberal Party	486,210	21.83	16
Croatian Peasant Party	258,953	11.62	5
Istrian Democratic Assembly	76,273	3.42	3
HSLS–HNS	45,657	2.05	–
Social Democratic Party of Croatia	41,955	1.88	1
HSLS–HNS–SDP	35,937	1.61	–
HSLS–HNS–HKDU–SDP	33,246	1.49	–
Croatian Christian Democratic Union	27,584	1.24	0
Dalmatian Action	26,303	1.18	0
RDS–IDS	22,801	1.02	–
HSLS–SDP	21,478	0.96	–
SDP–HSS	18,312	0.82	–
Social Democratic Union	17,413	0.78	0
Croatian People's Party	15,363	0.69	1
Serb People's Party	14,239	0.64	0
Croatian Party of Natural Law	7,026	0.32	0
Croatian Democratic Party of Rights	6,973	0.31	0
HNS–SDP	4,660	0.21	0
HKDU–HRZ–KNS	4,220	0.19	0
HKDU–HKDS–HDS	3,511	0.16	0
Homeland Civic Party	3,105	0.14	0
HKDS–HNS	2,895	0.13	0
Christian People's Party	2,872	0.13	0
Croatian Party	2,678	0.12	0
Istrian Liberal Party	2,296	0.10	0
Party of Democratic Action of Croatia	2,259	0.10	0
SDP–SSH–SDH	2,194	0.10	0
IPS–INS–KNS	1,690	0.08	0
Croatian Christian Democratic Party	1,632	0.07	0
HKDS–HDS–KNS	1,414	0.06	0
Central European Action Party	687	0.03	0
Independents	22,562	1.01	0
Appointed members			5
Total	2,227,763	100.00	68
Valid votes	2,227,763	96.70	
Invalid/blank votes	76,019	3.30	
Total votes	2,303,782	100.00	
Registered voters/turnout	3,580,396	64.34	
Source: Nohlen & Stöver, State Election Commission
