= 1997 Croatian Chamber of Counties election =

← 1993	13 April 1997
- 63 of the 68 seats in the Chamber of Counties
- Turnout: 71.37%
Party	Leader	Seats	+/–
HDZ	Franjo Tuđman	40	+3
HSS	Zlatko Tomčić	9	+4
HSLS	Vlado Gotovac	6	−10
SDP	Ivica Račan	4	+3
IDS	Ivan Jakovčić	2	−1
HSP	Anto Đapić	2	New
Appointees	–	5	0
This lists parties that won seats. See the complete results below.
Speaker before	Speaker after
Katica Ivanišević; HDZ	Katica Ivanišević; HDZ

Elections for the Second Assembly of the Chamber of Counties of the Croatian Parliament were held in Croatia on 13 April 1997. The result was a victory for the Croatian Democratic Union, which won 40 of the 63 elected seats. This was the last election for the Chamber of Counties, which was abolished through a constitutional amendment on 29 March 2001. UNTAES facilitated the conduct of elections in the United Nations protectorate region of Eastern Slavonia, Baranja and Western Syrmia.

== Results ==
President Franjo Tuđman had the constitutional right to appoint up to five members of the Chamber of Counties. He chose to exercise that right by naming Ivan Aralica, Jovan Bamburač, Slobodan Lang, Vojislav Stanimirović and Zlatko Vitez to the chamber.

Party	Votes	%	Seats	+/–
Croatian Democratic Union	1,060,909	41.94	40	+3
HSLS–HSS	358,530	14.17	–	–
SDP–HNS	281,496	11.13	–	–
Croatian Social Liberal Party	87,333	3.45	6	–10
Croatian Peasant Party	76,384	3.02	9	+4
Istrian Democratic Assembly	64,883	2.57	2	–1
HSLS–HNS–HSS	60,574	2.39	–	–
SDP–PGS–HNS	60,391	2.39	–	–
Social Democratic Party of Croatia	50,487	2.00	4	+3
Croatian Party of Rights 1861	46,162	1.83	0	New
HSU–ASH	39,673	1.57	–	–
Croatian Christian Democratic Union	33,531	1.33	0	0
Social Democratic Union	33,508	1.32	0	0
Serb People's Party	32,369	1.28	0	0
Croatian Pure Party of Rights	27,801	1.10	0	New
HDZ–HKDU–HSP–KDM	19,534	0.77	–	–
Croatian Party of Pensioners	18,156	0.72	0	New
Democratic Party of Zagorje	15,490	0.61	0	New
Istrian Democratic Forum	14,202	0.56	–	–
Croatian Party of Rights	13,003	0.51	2	New
SDP–HNS–HKDU	12,374	0.49	–	–
Croatian People's Party	10,644	0.42	0	–1
Party of Croatian Renaissance	9,683	0.38	0	New
Croatian Civic Peasant Party	9,403	0.37	0	New
DA–SDU	8,994	0.36	–	–
Slavonia-Baranja Croatian Party	8,325	0.33	0	New
Croatian Green Party	7,808	0.31	0	New
HGSS–HND	6,763	0.27	–	–
Croatian Democratic Peasant Party	6,474	0.26	0	New
SDU–SDA	5,326	0.21	–	–
Croatian Republican Union	5,314	0.21	0	0
Croatian Dalmatian Home	4,674	0.18	0	New
Croatian Christian Democratic Party	4,608	0.18	0	0
HKDU–SBHS	4,287	0.17	–	–
Croatian Independent Democrats	2,920	0.12	0	New
Istrian Independent Party	2,472	0.10	0	0
Croatian Democratic Party of Rights	2,402	0.09	0	0
Croatian Liberation Movement	2,370	0.09	0	New
Istrian Party	2,092	0.08	0	New
Croatian Peasant Workers' Party	1,542	0.06	0	New
Social Democratic Action of Croatia	1,310	0.05	0	New
Independent Party of Rights	1,149	0.05	0	New
Croatian Roma Party	1,054	0.04	0	New
Croatian Party	996	0.04	0	0
Homeland Civic Party	818	0.03	0	0
Independents	11,194	0.44	0	0
Appointed members			5	0
Total	2,529,412	100.00	68	0
Valid votes	2,529,412	96.71		
Invalid/blank votes	86,062	3.29		
Total votes	2,615,474	100.00		
Registered voters/turnout	3,664,666	71.37		
Source: Nohlen & Stöver, State Election Commission
