= Ivan Paštrić =

Croatian scholar

- Born: 1636; Poljica, Republic of Poljica
- Died: 20 March 1708 (aged 71–72); Rome, Papal States
- Resting place: Illyrian College of Loreto
- Other names: Iohannes Pastritius; Giovanni Pastrizio
- Occupations: scientist, poet and editor

Ivan Paštrić (Latin: Iohannes Pastritius, Italian: Giovanni Pastrizio) (1636 – 20 March 1708) was a Croatian scientist, poet, linguist and editor of the Glagolitic liturgical books.

== Biography ==
Paštrić was born in Poljica in Dalmatia and taken to Split in the first year of his life. In Split baptismal records is recorded that Ivan Paštrić, son of Antonia and Ivanica, was baptized by Andrea Reggio on 15 June 1636.

Paštrić was lecturer at the college of the Sacred Congregation for the Propagation of the Faith in Rome. In about 1700 donated his rich library to the seminary in Split. The books he donated became a basis of the Split Seminary Library. Jerolim Kavanjin referred to Paštrić as "master of all science".

Paštrić was probably a member of the Illyrian Academy founded in 1703 by John Peter Marchi. The establishment of the academy was probably initiated by Paštrić. Since 1691, he was a member of the Pontifical Academy of Arcadia. During last two years of his life Paštrić was president of the Illyrian Society of St. Jerome.

His only work published during his lifetime, Patenae argentae mysticae descriptio et explicatio (Rome 1706)—a vast, meticulous, and complex dissertation linked to the city of Imola and his relationship with another scholar of the period, Abbot Antonio Ferri—blends erudition, mysticism, and Christological allegory; it was only in 2025 that it was translated into Italian and, partially, into English.

Paštrić died in Rome on 20 March 1708. He was buried in the yard of the guesthouse of the Illyrian College of Loreto.

== See also ==
- List of Glagolitic books

== Sources ==
- Mrkonjić, Tomislav (2014). "PASTRIZIO, Giovanni". Dizionario Biografico degli Italiani (in Italian). Vol. 81: Pansini–Pazienza. Rome: Istituto dell'Enciclopedia Italiana. ISBN 978-88-12-00032-6.
- Božić-Bužančić, Danica (1999). Ivan Petar Marchi-Markić:Njegovo djelovanje i njegova oporuka. Zavod Povijesti Znanosti HAZU.
- Golub, Ivan; Kovačić, Slavko; Šimundža, Drago (1988). Ivan Paštrić 1636-1708: život, djelo i suvremenici : zbornik radova Znanstvenog skupa o 350. obljetnici rođenja. Crkva u Svijetu. ISBN 978-86-80201-07-8.
- umjetnosti, Jugoslavenska akademija znanosti i (1980). Starine.
- Stulli, Bernard (1969). Arhivski vjesnik.
- Fine, John V. A. Jr. (1 January 2006). When Ethnicity Did Not Matter in the Balkans: A Study of Identity in Pre-Nationalist Croatia, Dalmatia, and Slavonia in the Medieval and Early-Modern Periods. University of Michigan Press. ISBN 0-472-02560-0.
- Mrkonjić, Tomislav (1989). Il Teologo Ivan Paštrić (Giovanni Pastrizio) (1636-1708): Vita - opere - concezione della teologia - cristologia. Seraphicum.
- Stipčević, Aleksandar (1975). Libraries in Croatia. Croatian Library Association.
- Morović, Hrvoje; Anzulović, Neda (1988). Izbor iz djela. Književni Krug.
- Giovanni Pastrizio, Descrizione ed interpretazione della Patena Argentea Mistica che si venera come di San Pier Grisologo nella Cattedrale di San Cassiano, a cura di Matteo Veronesi, Imola, La Mandragora, 2025, ISBN 88-7586-792-5.
