= 1990 Croatian parliamentary election =

- 22–23 April 1990 (first round); 6–7 May 1990 (second round)
- All 80 seats in the Social-Political Council; 115 of the 116 seats in the Council of Municipalities; 156 of the 160 seats in the Council of Associated Labour
Party	Leader	Seats
HDZ	Franjo Tuđman	205
SKH–SDP	Ivica Račan	73
SKH–SDP / SS–SSH	–	17
KNS	Savka Dabčević-Kučar	11
HDS	Marko Veselica	10
SDS	Jovan Rašković	5
SS–SSH		4
SKH / SS–SSH / SSOH	–	3
HDZ / HSS	–	2
SKH / SS–SSH / SSOH / SUBNOR	–	2
SSOH		1
USPĐ		1
HDZ / HSLS	–	2
SKH–SDP / ZAS	–	1
HSS	Josip Torbar	1
Independents		13
This lists parties that won seats. See the complete results below.
Overall composition of the Croatian Parliament (all three chambers as one body)
Prime Minister before	Subsequent Prime Minister
Antun Milović; SKH	Stjepan Mesić; HDZ

Parliamentary elections were held in the Socialist Republic of Croatia between 22 and 23 April 1990; the second round of voting occurred on 6–7 May. These were the first multi-party elections held in Croatia since 1938, and the first such elections for the Croatian Parliament since 1913. Voters elected candidates for 356 seats in the tri-cameral parliament; the turnout in the first round ranged between 76.56% and 84.54% for various parliamentary chambers. In the second round, the turnout was 74.82%. The Croatian Democratic Union (HDZ) won 205 seats, ousted the League of Communists of Croatia – Party of Democratic Reform (SKH-SDP) from power and ended 45 years of communist rule in Croatia. The new parliament convened for the first time on 30 May, elected Franjo Tuđman as President of the Croatian Presidency and soon after renamed the office to President of Croatia.

The election took place during a political crisis within the Yugoslav federation, the disintegration of the League of Communists of Yugoslavia, and growing ethnic tensions between Croats and Serbs. Though the SKH-SDP was widely expected to win the elections, the HDZ took advantage of questions of nationality and political reform becoming the dominant issues of concern, and won by a wide margin. After the election, SKH-SDP lost a large proportion of its membership, many of whom crossed the party lines and joined the HDZ. The electoral campaign exacerbated ethnic rivalries, and mutually provocative actions led to deep mistrust. Fear was further fomented by authorities in the neighbouring Socialist Republic of Serbia. In the months following the elections, the Croatian parliament amended the Constitution of Croatia to remove the term "Socialist" from the republic's official name, and to remove communist symbols from the flag and coat of arms of Croatia.

== Background ==
On 10 December 1989, one day before the party's 11th Congress, the Central Committee of the League of Communists of Croatia (Croatian: Savez komunista Hrvatske—SKH) held an emergency meeting. The body adopted a decision, by a majority of seven to six, that the next election, due to be held in early 1990, would be a free, multiparty election. At the Congress, Ivica Račan, who supported the Central Committee's decision, won the position of SKH Chairman by a small margin. Račan's victory gave support to liberal and reformist initiatives in the sphere of political administration. The Congress also supported the release of all political prisoners and the termination of all political trials. Encouraged by this change in SKH policy, the Croatian Parliament amended legislation to permit the establishment of political parties other than the SKH on 11 January 1990. Even though the decision by the SKH Central Committee of 10 December 1989 coincided with the signing of a public petition demanding free, multiparty elections, the SKH's move was not motivated by public opinion. It was based on the SKH's wish to achieve greater power and confidence through an election victory.

The SKH's plans for liberalization and reform extended further. With the League of Communists of Slovenia (Slovene: Zveza komunistov Slovenije—ZKS), it put forward a proposal to hold multiparty elections and to reform the SKJ into a loose confederation of political parties in which the SKJ had no authority over associated parties, effectively eliminating the SKJ from political life. The proposal was put forward at the SKJ's 14th Extraordinary Congress on 22 January 1990, at which a confrontation primarily between the ZKS and the Serbian delegation led by Slobodan Milošević, which was supported by the majority of delegates, developed. All the ZKS's proposals were rejected and the Slovene delegates left in protest. In turn, SKH representatives demanded the Congress be adjourned, but the Serbian and Montenegrin delegates preferred to continue the Congress without the Slovenes. In response, the SKH delegates also left the Congress, effectively marking the end of the SKJ.

== Electoral legislation ==
On 15 February, the Croatian Parliament adopted amendments to the Constitution of the Socialist Republic of Croatia and passed a package of electoral laws to facilitate multiparty elections, but left the parliamentary system unchanged. Elections were scheduled for all 356 seats in the tricameral parliament consisting of the Socio-Political Council (80 seats), the Council of Associated Labour (160 seats) and the Council of Municipalities (116 seats). The electoral legislation established constituencies for each parliamentary chamber, whose sizes varied greatly. The eighty Socio-Political Council constituencies encompassed many small municipalities or parts of large ones, varying in population from fewer than 32,000 to more than 80,000. In the Council of Municipalities, each municipality served as a single-member constituency by itself; the population variance between the municipalities was even greater, ranging from 1,000 in Lastovo to more than 150,000 in Osijek. The Associated Labour Council members were to be elected in 160 constituencies whose populations also varied greatly. There was no universal suffrage for the Associated Labour Council elections; voting was restricted to the employed, the self-employed and students.

The electoral legislation defined a two-round system of voting. Candidates receiving a 50% of votes from at least 33.3% of the constituency win election outright in a single-member constituency. If no candidate received the required level of support, a second round was scheduled two weeks later, in which all candidates who received at least 7% of votes in the first round could take part. The candidate who received the most votes—not necessarily an absolute majority—win the constituency. The two-round system was adopted despite the objection of opposition groups, who demanded proportional representation. The first round of the elections was scheduled for 22–23 April, and the second round for 6–7 May.

== Political parties ==
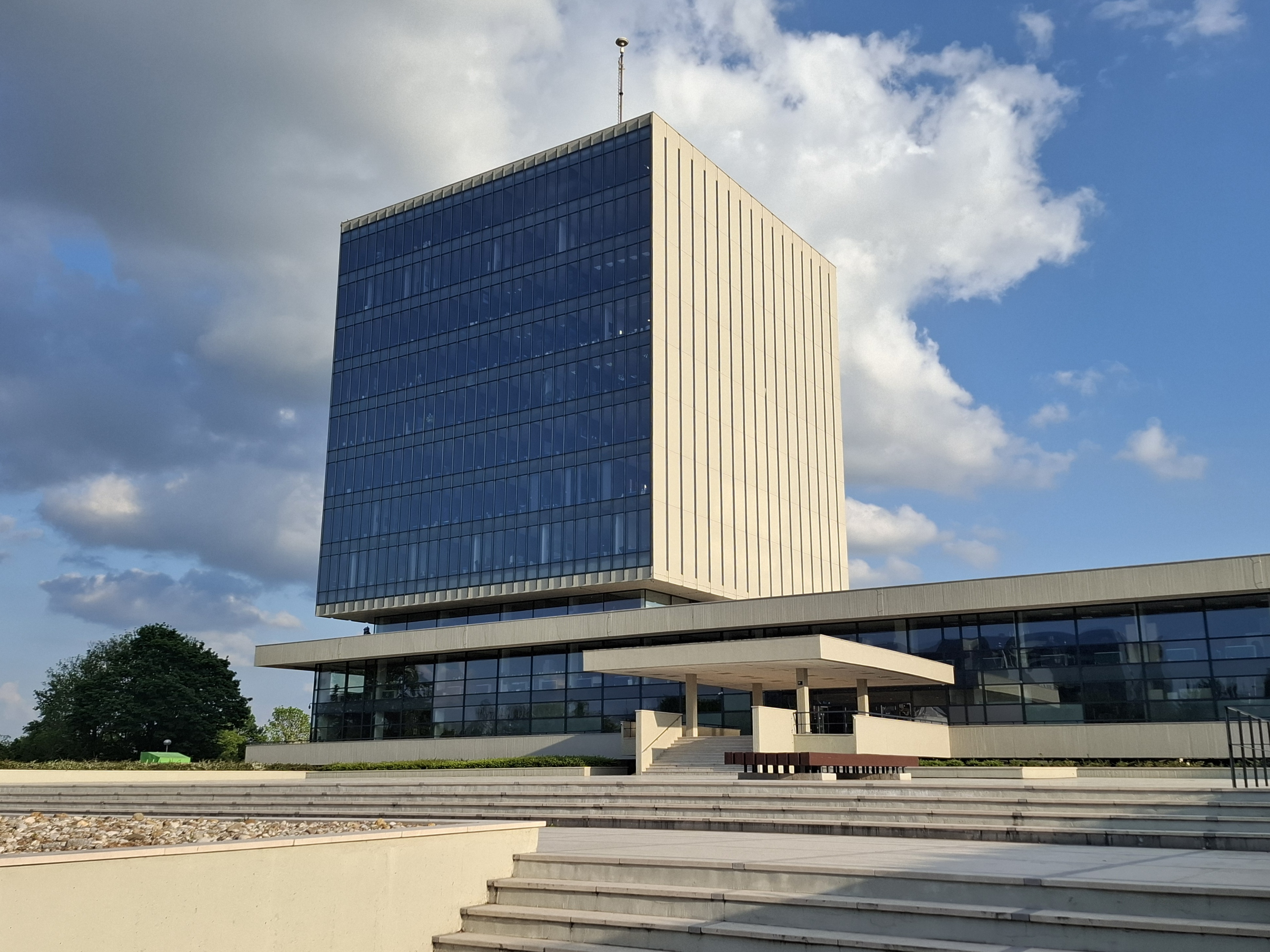
Headquarters of the League of Communists of Croatia

The first opposition groups in Croatia were set up as civic associations in 1989. The first among them was the Croatian Social Liberal Union (Croatian: Hrvatski socijalno-liberalni savez—HSLS), which was founded on 20 May 1989 and was later renamed the Croatian Social Liberal Party. The Croatian Democratic Union (Croatian: Hrvatska demokratska zajednica—HDZ), which would later become the main opposition to the SKH, was founded on 17 June 1989 but was registered on 25 January 1990. The HDZ held its first convention on 24–25 February 1990, when Franjo Tuđman was elected its president. On 1 March 1990, the Coalition of People's Accord (Croatian: Koalicija narodnog sporazuma—KNS) was formed as an alliance of the Croatian Christian Democratic Party (Croatian: Hrvatska kršćanska demokratska stranka—HKDS), the Social Democratic Party of Croatia (Croatian: Socijaldemokratska stranka Hrvatske—SDSH), the Croatian Democratic Party (Croatian: Hrvatska demokratska stranka—HDS), the HSLS and five independent candidates; Savka Dabčević-Kučar, Ivan Supek, Miko Tripalo, Dragutin Haramija and Srećko Bijelić, who were prominent figures of the 1971 Croatian Spring political movement.

On 17 February 1990, the Serb Democratic Party was founded, but failed to spread its organization significantly beyond Knin. Generally, organizational skills of the parties varied significantly; only SKH candidates stood for election in every constituency. The HDZ did not field candidates in 82 constituencies (25 for the Council of Municipalities and 57 for the Council of Associated Labour).

On 5 February, Croatian authorities registered the first seven political parties, including the SKH, HDZ, HSLS and several other members of the KNS. Eighteen political parties and many independent candidates took part in the election. 1,609 candidates ran for seats in the parliament. On 20 March, the SKH decided to change its name to League of Communists of Croatia – Party of Democratic Reform (Croatian: Savez komunista Hrvatske – Stranka demokratskih promjena—SKH-SDP).

== Campaign ==
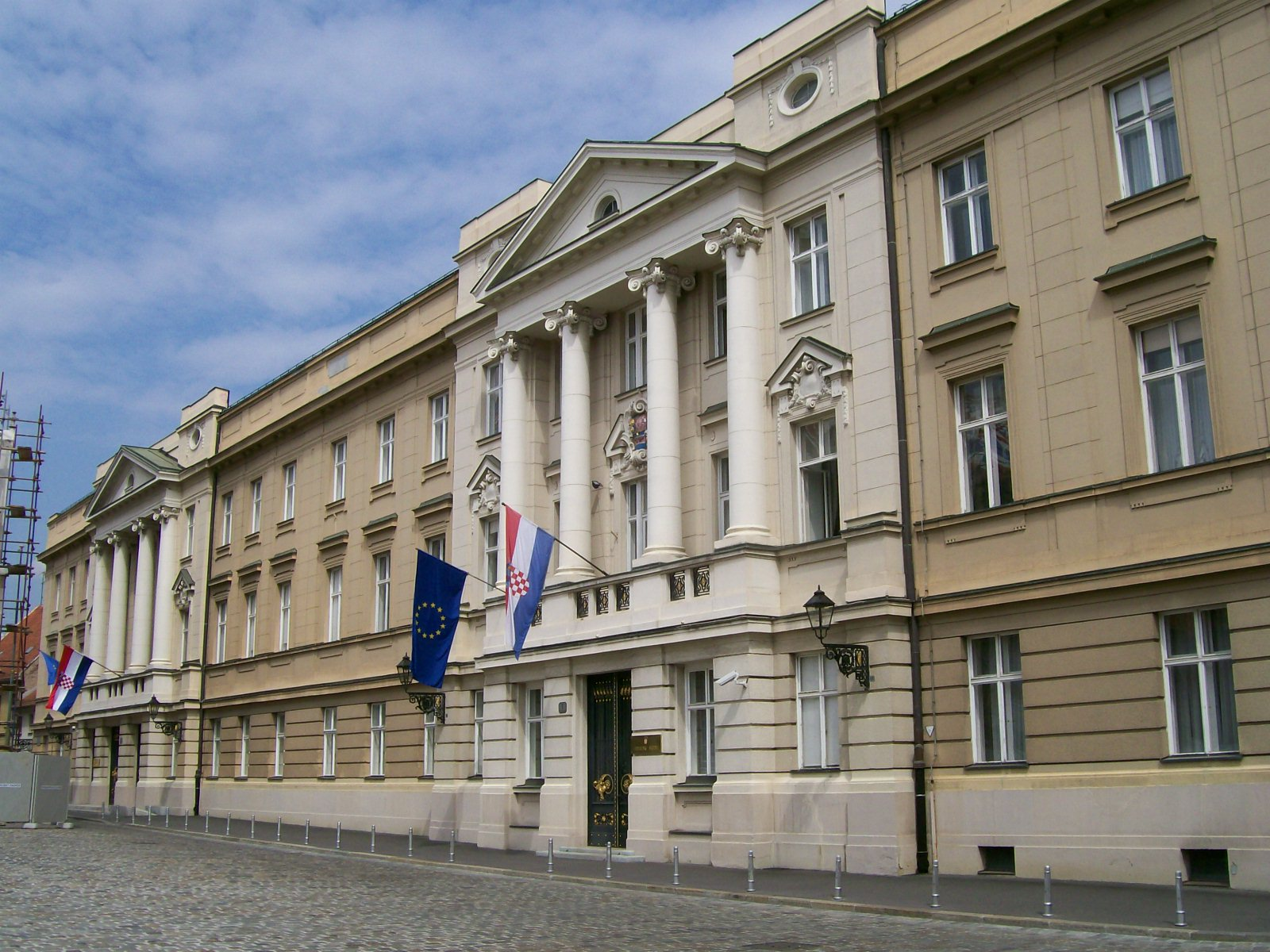
Croatian Parliament building

The election campaign took place from late March until 20 April, employing a mix of traditional devices and concepts inspired by election campaigns in the West. These largely involved the use of posters, flags bearing the Croatian chequy arms, graffiti, badges, stickers, support from entertainers and media, and the use of political rallies. Parties also relied on word of mouth, media manipulation and even paranoia. An overall lack of political experience led to the use of some awkward, distasteful or otherwise poor slogans and posters. SKH-SDP posters were largely devoted to Račan and his messages: "We stopped single-mindedness, achieved democracy, Croatia freely elects" and "Račan's NO to single-mindedness". The HDZ used simple messages: "One knows – HDZ" and "HDZ – our name is our agenda", while the KNS used an image of a chessboard with the word Koalicija (Coalition) inscribed in its fields. In the initial stages of the campaign, the SDP-SKH was generally expected to win; The Economist predicted a coalition government would be formed.

Issues of nation and elections/democracy dominated the overall campaign; economic issues were three-times-less represented than either of the former issues. A similar breakdown of campaign focus existed in the cases of the HDZ, SKH-SDP and KNS when analyzed individually. The theme of restructuring Yugoslavia as a looser confederation and, should that fail, achieving independence was reaffirmed in the campaign and accepted by Tuđman. For the SKH-SDP, the elections primarily meant a campaign for the reform of the Yugoslav federation. The HDZ's priority was building the Croatian state.

In the run-up to the vote, 15% of Croats said they supported independence and 64% declared in favour of the proposed confederation. 37% said independence was a political priority. Parties gradually developed their ethnic profiles during the campaign. While the SDS appealed exclusively to Croatian Serb voters, surveys indicated 98% of the HDZ's voters were Croats. The KNS applied moderately nationalistic rhetoric but failed to seriously challenge the HDZ. Growing Serbian and Croatian Serb nationalism increasingly prompted Croat voters to support the HDZ. The SKH-SDP appealed to an ethnically mixed electorate; surveys indicated 52% of its supporters were Croats, 28% were Serbs and 17% declared themselves as Yugoslavs. Among Croatian Serbs, only 23% supported the SDS, while 46% supported the SKH-SDP. Eventually, the HDZ emerged as the most credible anti-communist party in Croatia, rejecting the arbitrary rule and corruption that many Croatians associated with 45 years of communist domination, and affirming Croatia's national and religious identity.

=== Media coverage ===
Mainstream media in Croatia largely portrayed Tuđman and HDZ as right-wing nationalists, often as extremists who threatened Yugoslavia's continuation as a unified state. These comparisons were made following conflicting media statements by the party's leaders—especially at the HDZ general convention—which made it difficult to assess whether this was merely an electoral tactic, or whether the party's intention was to encourage Croatian nationalism. The Croatian public came to view the HDZ as the only party that could effectively "defend Croatia's national interests". The SKH-SDP was portrayed as a party of moderates by the Croatian media, and it avoided using the term "Croatian national interests" as a major talking point, fearing it would lose the support of Croatian Serb voters. The KNS was positioned between the two but its incoherent approach and greater emphasis on individual rights rather than national issues cost it votes.

Beginning in mid-1988, mainstream Serbian media reported that Croatia was supporting Albanian separatism in the Serbian province of Kosovo and was oppressing Croatian Serbs to pressure Serbia's leaders. Media heavily criticized the HDZ and equated it with the fascist Ustaše movement that controlled Croatia during World War II, while the possibility of a HDZ electoral victory was portrayed as a revival of the Croatian fascist state. This rhetoric was reinforced after Tuđman said the Independent State of Croatia (NDH) was "not merely a quisling construct, but also an expression of the historical aspirations of the Croatian nation". Serbian media consequently equated the prospect of an HDZ electoral victory with a repeat of the Ustaše-led massacres, deportations and forced conversions of Serbs that had occurred in Croatia during World War II. Tuđman referred to this in his speeches, specifically in Sinj and Zadar in March and April: "we do not want to restore the NDH which was created and disappeared in World War II and, regardless of the fact that the Croatian people wanted their own state in World War II and before and after that, that NDH committed crimes and did not bring freedom to the Croatian people". He emphasized that Istria, Rijeka and Dalmatia were now Croatian precisely because the Croatian people participated in the partisan movement and found themselves on the side of the victors.

Media had criticized the SKH-SDP since 1989 as ineffective in stopping the rise of Croatian nationalism; the SDS was promoted as the Croatian Serbs' only hope of preserving their national identity.

==== Petrova Gora rally ====
The site of the Petrova Gora rally

A a rally held at Petrova Gora on 4 March had a significant impact upon ethnic homogenization. It was not formally associated with any party standing in the election; it was organized by the municipalities of Vojnić and Vrginmost, and the Yugoslav Independent Democratic Party. According to the then-mayor of Vrginmost, the two municipalities had organized the rally to show their support for brotherhood and unity—a Titoist concept whereby all of Yugoslavia's ethnic groups would live in harmony—instead of letting it become a Serb nationalist event. The rally was attended by tens of thousand Serbs who heard mainly pro-Yugoslav speeches about the threat posed by the HDZ and the unfavourable position of Serbs in Croatian society. The SKH-SDP condemned the rally in advance as being harmful to inter-ethnic relations and potentially capable of increasing Croatian nationalism. Croatian media linked the rally to the anti-bureaucratic revolution in neighbouring Serbia and depicted it as a protest demanding the overthrow of the Croatian government. Conversely, Serbian media equated the SKH-SDP with the HDZ, declared the entire Croatian political spectrum nationalist and said Serbs should not take part in Croatia's electoral process.

==== Benkovac rally ====
A HDZ rally in Benkovac, held on 18 March, also led to substantial media coverage in Croatia and Serbia, and significantly influenced the general atmosphere surrounding the election campaign. The event drew several thousand HDZ supporters and several hundred Serbs who booed speakers and threw missiles at them. During Tuđman's address, a 62-year-old Serbian man, Boško Čubrilović, approached the podium. When he was stopped by security, Čubrilović drew a gas pistol. He was thrown to the ground; the gun was confiscated and shown to the crowd and described as the gun meant to kill Tuđman. The rally disintegrated into a mass brawl that was stopped by police. Croatian media described the incident as an assassination attempt. Čubrilović was charged with threatening the security staff, for which he was tried and convicted in late 1990. The incident increased ethnic tensions and firmly positioned ethnic issues as an important theme of the election campaign. Croatian media described the incident as an attempt to destabilize Croatia, while Serbian media said the events in Benkovac embodied the legitimate fears of Croatian Serbs brought on by the rise of Croatian nationalism embodied by Tuđman and the HDZ.

== Voting ==
The first round of voting, held on 22–23 April, decided 137 of the 356 seats in the three chambers of the parliament. HDZ won 107 of them, while SKH-SDP received 14 seats outright and three more in coalition with the Socialist Alliance – League of Socialists of Croatia (Croatian: Socijalistički savez – Savez socijalista Hrvatske—SS-SSH). The remaining 13 seats were distributed between independent candidates and four other parties. KNS received one seat. In response to KNS's poor result, HDS left the coalition and continued to campaign on its own. After the results were announced, SKH-SDP realized it would lose the elections; Račan stated that SKH-SDP would be a strong opposition party. Tuđman declared that with the HDZ in power there would be no personal revenge against the SKH-SDP members who had dismissed HDZ supporters from their jobs, but that those who opposed HDZ's views would be removed from public office.

The second round of voting was held on 6–7 May in 214 seats undecided in the first round — 51 in the Socio-Political Council, 60 in the Council of Municipalities, and 103 in the Council of Associated Labour. In addition to the seats won in the first round, HDZ won 98, while SKH-SDP alone or in coalition with SS-SSH received 73 seats.

Overall, in the two rounds of voting, 351 seats in the three chambers of the parliament were decided. HDZ won 205 seats on its own and four through candidates supported jointly with Croatian Peasant Party (Croatian: Hrvatska seljačka stranka—HSS) (2) and HSLS (2), SKH-SDP won 73 seats alone, and 23 more were won by candidates supported by SKH-SDP and other political entities. Other parties winning seats in the parliament were KNS (11), HDS (10), SDS (5) SS-SSH (4), HSS (1) and SSOH (1). Association of independent entrepreneurs of Đurđevac won one seat and 13 were won by independent candidates.

Generally, HDZ fared the best in both rounds of voting in areas where Croats represented the absolute majority. SKH-SDP did well in ethnically mixed areas of Banovina, Kordun and Lika. It also fared well in Istria and major cities, especially in Split, Rijeka, and Osijek—a result interpreted as a consequence of specific socio-economic properties of the population there. SKH-SDP suffered a substantial defeat in Zagreb.

== Results ==
=== Council of Associated Labour ===
Party	First round			Second round			Total seats
Party	Votes	%	Seats	Votes	%	Seats	Total seats
Croatian Democratic Union	475,820	32.69	41	239,969	28.32	42	83
League of Communists of Croatia – Party of Democratic Changes	364,718	25.06	6	267,380	31.56	32	38
Croatian Democratic Party	56,856	3.91	1	41,316	4.88	6	7
Coalition of People's Accord	151,253	10.39	1	92,765	10.95	5	6
SKH-SDP/SS-SSH joint candidates	18,674	1.28	0	19,447	2.30	4	4
Socialist Alliance-League of Socialists of Croatia	78,131	5.37	0	43,664	5.15	1	1
Serb Democratic Party	5,286	0.36	1				1
SKH-SDP/SS-SSH/SSOH joint candidates	17,150	1.18	0	30,430	3.59	4	1
League of Socialist Youth of Croatia	17,150	1.18	0	30,430	3.59	4	1
Croatian Peasant Party	17,150	1.18	0	30,430	3.59	4	1
Association of Independent Entrepreneurs of Đurđevac	17,150	1.18	0	30,430	3.59	4	1
Others	17,150	1.18	0	30,430	3.59	4	0
Independents	287,477	19.75	3	112,317	13.26	9	12
Total	1,455,365	100.00	53	847,288	100.00	103	156
Valid votes	1,455,365	95.06		847,288	94.88		
Invalid/blank votes	75,611	4.94		45,677	5.12		
Total votes	1,530,976	100.00		892,965	100.00		
Registered voters/turnout	2,003,154	76.43		1,352,101	66.04		
Source: Croatian State Electoral Committee

=== Council of Municipalities ===
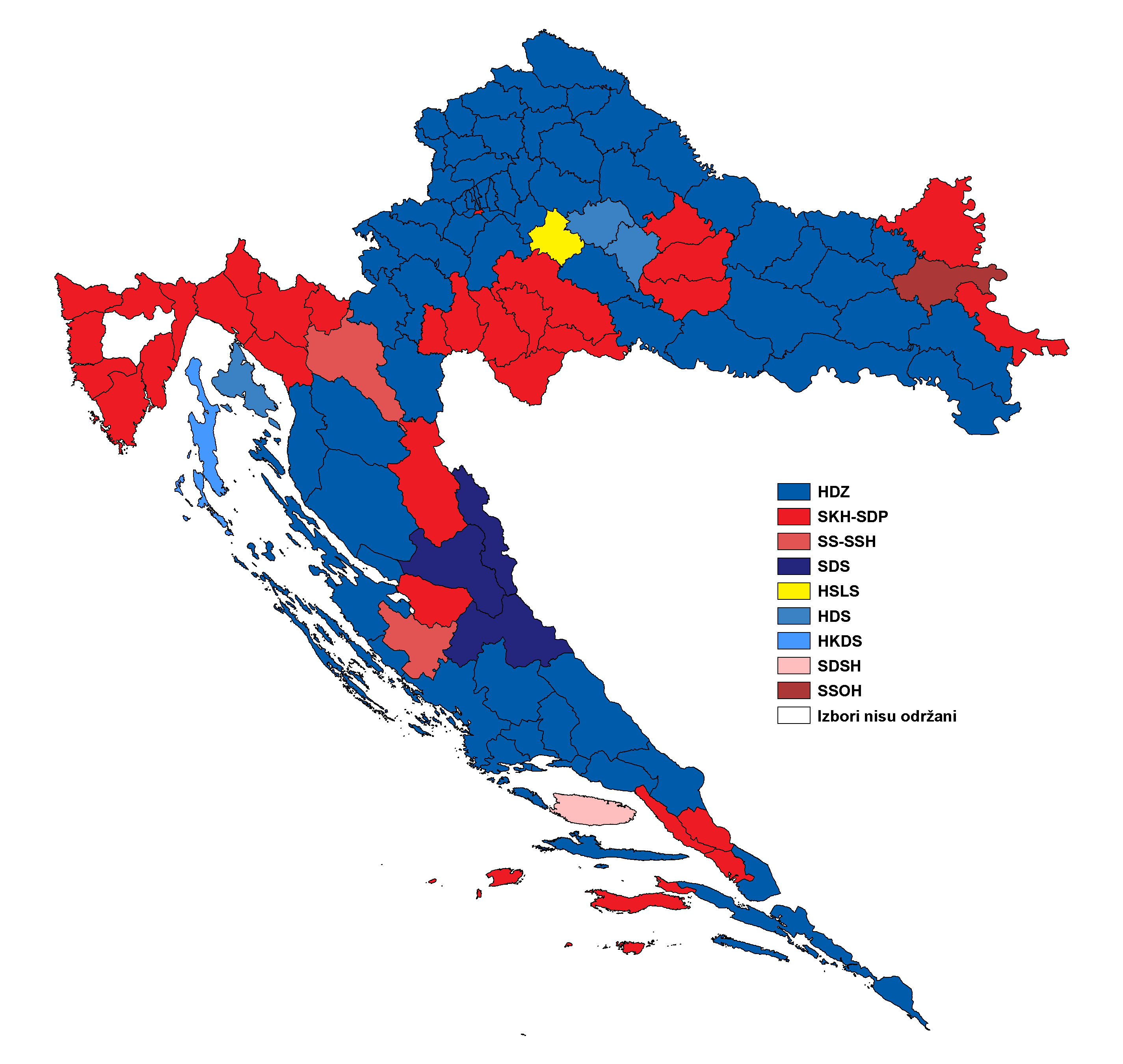
Results of the election for the Council of Municipalities HDZ SKH-SDP SS-SSH SDS HDS HKDS SSOH SDSH HSLS Elections not held

Party	First round			Second round			Total seats
Party	Votes	%	Seats	Votes	%	Seats	Total seats
Croatian Democratic Union	1,507,521	43.91	41	659,740	41.50	27	68
League of Communists of Croatia – Party of Democratic Changes	868,147	25.28	6	529,137	33.28	17	23
SKH-SDP/SS-SSH joint candidates	98,449	2.87	3	80,066	5.04	6	9
Croatian Democratic Party	131,218	3.82	2	47,340	2.98	1	3
Serb Democratic Party	30,747	0.90	1	8,644	0.54	2	3
Coalition of People's Accord	321,623	9.37	0	130,190	8.19	2	2
Socialist Alliance-League of Socialists of Croatia	198,406	5.78	0	45,073	2.83	1	1
SKH-SDP/SS-SSH/SSOH/SUBNOR joint candidates	161,105	4.69	2	69,974	4.40	4	2
SKH-SDP/SS-SSH/SSOH joint candidates	161,105	4.69	2	69,974	4.40	4	1
HDZ/HSS joint candidates	161,105	4.69	2	69,974	4.40	4	1
HDZ/HSLS joint candidates	161,105	4.69	2	69,974	4.40	4	2
Others	161,105	4.69	2	69,974	4.40	4	0
Independents	116,332	3.39	0	19,730	1.24	0	0
Total	3,433,548	100.00	55	1,589,894	100.00	60	115
Valid votes	3,433,548	96.45		1,589,894	97.02		
Invalid/blank votes	126,230	3.55		48,804	2.98		
Total votes	3,559,778	100.00		1,638,698	100.00		
Registered voters/turnout	4,251,514	83.73		2,200,643	74.46		
Source: Croatian State Electoral Committee

=== Social-Political Council ===
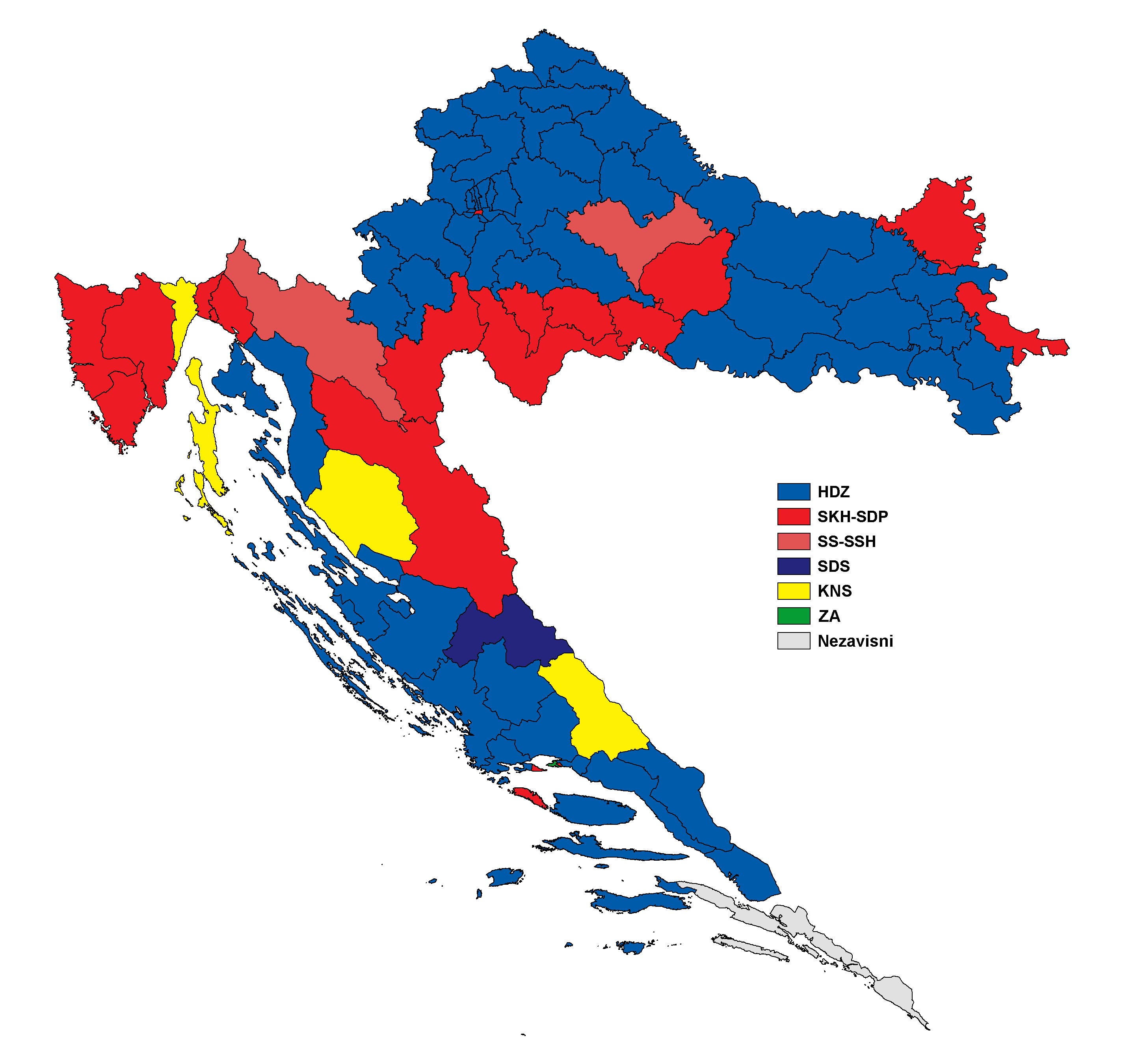
Results of the election for the Socio-Political Council by electoral district HDZ SKH-SDP KNS SSH SDS ZA Independent

Party	First round			Second round			Total seats
Party	Votes	%	Seats	Votes	%	Seats	Total seats
Croatian Democratic Union	1,200,691	41.76	25	708,007	42.18	29	54
League of Communists of Croatia – Party of Democratic Changes	678,086	23.59	2	461,979	27.52	10	12
SKH-SDP/SS-SSH joint candidates	129,248	4.50	0	107,948	6.43	4	4
Coalition of People's Accord	316,023	10.99	0	166,046	9.89	3	3
Socialist Alliance-League of Socialists of Croatia	186,726	6.49	0	57,418	3.42	2	2
Serb Democratic Party	46,418	1.61	1	34,682	2.07	0	1
Croatian Democratic Party	113,544	3.95	0	70,823	4.22	0	0
SKH-SDP/SS-SSH/SSOH joint candidates	86,158	3.00	0	58,312	3.47	3	1
SKH-SDP/ZAS joint candidates	86,158	3.00	0	58,312	3.47	3	1
HDZ/HSS joint candidates	86,158	3.00	0	58,312	3.47	3	1
Others	86,158	3.00	0	58,312	3.47	3	0
Independents	118,167	4.11	1	13,197	0.79	0	1
Total	2,875,061	100.00	29	1,678,412	100.00	51	80
Valid votes	2,875,061	96.15		1,678,412	96.64		
Invalid/blank votes	115,117	3.85		58,437	3.36		
Total votes	2,990,178	100.00		1,736,849	100.00		
Registered voters/turnout	3,544,112	84.37		2,320,082	74.86		
Source: Croatian State Electoral Committee

== Aftermath ==
The elections were the first multiparty elections held in Croatia since 11 December 1938 elections for the National Assembly of the Kingdom of Yugoslavia, and were the first such elections for the Croatian parliament since 16 December 1913. SKH-SDP graciously accepted HDZ's electoral victory, but the defeat led to substantial losses of party members. Those who left SKH-SDP included traditionalist communists and Croatian Serb party members who followed the lead of Borislav Mikelić. 97,000 members of SKH-SDP switched their political allegiances and joined HDZ. By June, SKH-SDP membership dropped from 298,000 to 46,000.

Following a plan designed to coincide with the change of regime in Croatia, and in neighbouring Slovenia, the General Staff of the Yugoslav People's Army (Croatian: Jugoslavenska Narodna Armija—JNA) moved in to confiscate Croatia's and Slovenia's Territorial Defence (Croatian: Teritorijalna obrana—TO) weapons to minimize the possibility of armed resistance from the two republics. The plan was executed on 14 May before the newly elected parliament convened. Unlike Slovene authorities—which salvaged nearly a third of the TO stockpile—Croatia was caught unprepared and the JNA seized all Croatian TO weapons, effectively disarming the republic's security forces. An exception was made in cases of Serb-populated areas, where local TO depots were left intact or even augmented by the JNA. The weapons would only be recaptured in late 1991 in the Battle of the Barracks, or returned in its aftermath by the JNA.

=== New parliament ===
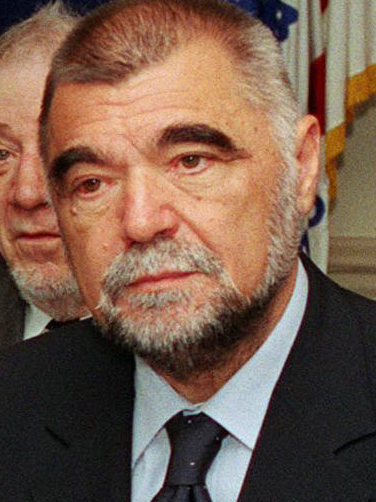
Stjepan Mesić was appointed the prime minister by the new parliament

The newly elected Parliament convened on 30 May and elected Tuđman as President of Presidency of Croatia by 281 votes to 50, in a secret ballot. Žarko Domljan was elected the speaker of the parliament and Stjepan Mesić was appointed the prime minister. SDS leader Jovan Rašković was offered a position in the government but he declined the offer. In line with Tuđman's announcement following the first round of elections, the new government soon started to purge Serbs from public office. This was primarily concerned with the police, where ethnic Serbs comprised approximately 75% of personnel in disproportion to the 12% they comprised in the ethnic mix of Croatia. Tuđman sanctioned the dismissal of Serbs from the police and their replacement with Croats, reducing the proportion of Serbs in the police force to 28% by November 1992. Similar policies were applied in the judiciary, media and the education system, though this was expanded to encompass others who were not in agreement with HDZ.

In the aftermath of the elections, Tuđman was reluctant to proceed towards independence, realizing Croatia's vulnerability in any armed conflict. At the first session of the parliament, Tuđman addressed the members and announced the government's immediate tasks; the adoption of a new constitution, the resolving of the issue of Croatia's position in Yugoslavia, and integration into the European Community to ensure its independence and development.

On 29 June 1990, the parliament started work on amendments to the Constitution of Croatia designed to remove all references to communism and socialism. The amendments were prepared and adopted on 25 July. The official name of the republic was changed to the Republic of Croatia, the President of the Presidency became the President of Croatia, and a new coat of arms was adopted as a chequy of 25 red and white fields, which replaced the red star on the flag of Croatia. Serbs interpreted the chequy used in the new arms and flag as provocative and reminiscent of NDH and Ustaše. While the chequy was used by the Nazi-puppet regime during the World War II, the symbol was also used in the arms of Croatia as a constituent part of Yugoslavia. Nonetheless, Serbs perceived the symbol as threatening.

=== Croatian Serb response ===
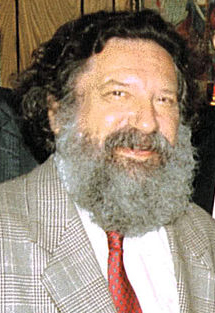
Jovan Rašković, the head of the Serb Democratic Party

Serbian nationalism in Croatia was well developed long before HDZ took power, but legislation and especially nationalist rhetoric used by HDZ fed that nationalism. An association of Serb municipalities was already established in Knin ahead of the elections. Civilians armed by the authorities of Serbia patrolled the area as Croatian control waned in the region. The Serbian government responded to HDZ's electoral victory by stating that Croatian authorities intended only to harm Croatian Serbs, exacerbating the already tense situation and supporting extremists among the SDS ranks. Provocative actions of extremists among HDZ further served SDS hardliners' goals to instill fear among Serbs.

On 25 July, hours after the parliament adopted the amendments, Serb National Council (SNC) was set up at a political rally in Srb and the Declaration on sovereignty and autonomy of Serbian nation was adopted. On 1 August, the SNC met in Knin, elected Milan Babić as its president and announced a referendum on Serb autonomy in parts of Croatia with Serb-majority populations. It was scheduled for the period from 19 August to 2 September. Croatian authorities declared the plan illegal on 3 August.

On 17 August, Croatian authorities planned to restore their control of Knin and deployed police via Benkovac and Obrovac towards the town. The Airborne Unit of the special police was ferried by helicopters from Zagreb as reinforcements. Knin police inspector Milan Martić deployed Knin police against the Croatian forces, and mobilized police reservists in the area to fell trees and block road access to the town, earning the event the moniker Log Revolution. The JNA deployed Yugoslav Air Force jets to intercept the helicopters and Croatian authorities backed down. The SNC referendum went ahead and produced support for an "independent status" of Croatian Serbs. Babić consolidated power over the region, which soon became the Serbian Autonomous Oblast Krajina (SAO Krajina). As SAO Krajina gradually consolidated and expanded areas under its control, armed clashes in Pakrac and Plitvice Lakes ensued by March and April 1991, sparking the Croatian War of Independence. By that time, 28 of the 37 ethnic Serb members of the Croatian parliament, including all five SDS representatives, had left the parliament.
