= Dalmatian National Party =

The Dalmatian National Party may refer to:

- Dalmatian National Party (1874) - the party of that name founded in 1874.
- Dalmatian National Party (1990) - the party of that name founded in 1990.
