= John Marchi =

John Marchi may refer to:

- John J. Marchi (1921–2009), American attorney and jurist
- John Peter Marchi (1663–1733), Venetian jurist
