= Illyrian Academy, Split =

Illyrian Academy
- Academia Illyrika iliti vam Slovinska
- Formation: probably in 1703 or 1704
- Founder: John Peter Marchi
- Founded at: Split
- Dissolved: 1731
- Purpose: Catholic counter-reformation; advancing Slavic letters and language
- Headquarters: Split

The Illyrian Academy (Academia Illyrika iliti vam Slovinska) was an academy established in Split, Venetian Republic probably in 1703 or 1704. Its mission was to further the causes of the Counter-Reformation movement of the Catholic Church and to advance 'Slavic letters' hoping to spread the use of the Slavic (Slovinski) language. The intention of members of this academy was to make their language more attractive and to deal with questions of the writing style. They established the academy in Split because they considered language spoken in Split as the most accomplished Slavic language. They were also concerned about liberation of the Slavic brothers from the Ottoman rule.

== Background ==
The establishment of this academy corresponds with decline of the Ottoman Empire and introduction of the Slavic language into literature published for the Slavic speakers of the Balkans. The Illyrian Academy was one of many similar academies established in Dalmatia in the beginning of the 18th century to further the causes of the Counter-Reformation movement of the Catholic church and to advance Slavic letters hoping to spread the use of Slavic (Slovinski) language.

== Establishment ==
The establishment of the academy was probably initiated by Ivan Paštrić.

The Illyrian Academy was founded at the very beginning of the 18th century, probably in 1703 or in 1704. John Peter Marchi, a member of the Split nobility, was founder, president and member of the Illyrian Academy. The archbishop of the Roman Catholic Archdiocese of Split-Makarska, Stephanus Cosimi, supported the establishment of the Illyrian Academy. In his 1703 letter he informs Paštrić about the establishment of the academy. Paštrić probably became a member of the Illyrian Academy.

The purpose of the Illyrian Academy was to develop science and literature having academies in Italy as role model. The Illyirian Academy published literature works using a language spoken by the people.

In 1703 it had 19 members, including Catholic priest Franjo Kriton, Jerolim Kavanjin, Ivan Dražić and Petar Macukat. The Saint protector of the academy was Saint Jerome.

== Sources ==
- hrvatska (1952). Hrvatsko kolo. Matica hrvatska.
- Ljubić, Šime (1869). Ogledalo književne poviesti jugoslavjanske na podučavanje mladeži.
- Morović, Hrvoje (1971). Povijest biblioteka u gradu Splitu. Društvo bibliotekara Hrvatske.
- HAZU (1999). Radovi Zavoda za povijesne znanosti HAZU u Zadru. Zavod.
- Božić-Bužančić, Danica (1982). Privatni i društveni život Splita u osamnaestom stoljeću. Skolška knjiga.
- straža (1935). Jadranska straža.
- Matica (1998). Mogućnosti. Matica hrvatska, Split.
- Zavod (1960). Pregled istorije jugoslovenskih naroda: Ot najstarijih vremena do 1848. Zavod za izdavanje Republike Scbije.
- Novak, Slobodan Prosperov; Kratofil, Mirko (1999). Povijest hrvatske književnosti. Izdanja Antibarbarus.
- Vjesnik (1967). Vjesnik bibliotekara Hrvatske.
- Fine, John V. A. Jr. (1 January 2006). When Ethnicity Did Not Matter in the Balkans: A Study of Identity in Pre-Nationalist Croatia, Dalmatia, and Slavonia in the Medieval and Early-Modern Periods. University of Michigan Press. ISBN 0-472-02560-0.
- Morović, Hrvoje; Anzulović, Neda (1988). Izbor iz djela. Književni Krug.
- Božić-Bužančić, Danica (1999). Ivan Petar Marchi-Markić:Njegovo djelovanje i njegova oporuka. Zavod Povijesti Znanosti HAZU.
