= Croatian Social Democrats =

- Leader: Ivica Pančić
- Founded: 2004
- Headquarters: Zagreb
- Ideology: Social democracy Anti-globalization

Website
- www.hsd.com.hr

Croatian Social Democrats (Croatian: Hrvatski socijaldemokrati), abbreviated HSD, is a minor left-wing Croatian political party. It came into existence in 2004 as a splinter party of the much more influential Social Democratic Party of Croatia (SDP).

As of 2011 HSD never won any seats in the general elections. Its only MP was Ivica Pančić who was elected to two consecutive terms in 2003 and 2007 on the Social Democratic Party of Croatia (SDP) ticket. While in office he resigned his SDP membership in January 2010 and spent eight months serving as an independent until joining HSD in September 2010.

== History ==
For the 2007 election, HDS made an alliance with Left of Croatia, Socialist Labour Party of Croatia and Istrian Socialdemocratic Forum. The alliance got 9,884 votes.

In August 2010 former SDP member of parliament and minister of war veterans in the Račan government Ivica Pančić announced he was "taking over" the Party. He left SDP after supporting Milan Bandić, another SDP dissident in the presidential elections in January 2010. With Pančić joining, HSD became a parliamentary party.

== Electoral history ==
Election	In coalition with	Votes won (coalition totals)	Percentage	Seats won	Change
2007	SRP-LH-ISDF	9,884	0.66	0 / 151	Steady
