= Coalition of People's Accord =

Political alliance in Croatia

Coalition of People's Accord (Croatian: Koalicija narodnog sporazuma, KNS) was the bloc of mostly moderate nationalist and liberal parties formed on the eve of first multi-party elections in Croatia in 1990.

The Coalition was initiated by ex-communists Savka Dabčević-Kučar and Miko Tripalo, two leaders of Croatian Spring who, unlike most other Croatian nationalist icons, declined to form their own party after the arrival of multi-party in Croatia. They feared that the large number of competing parties would ultimately lead to nationalist and anti-Communist votes being split, thus allowing the League of Communists of Croatia-Party of Democratic Changes (SKH-SDP, later to become Social Democratic Party of Croatia, SDP) to remain in power. Instead they advocated that all those parties form a broad coalition with two of them as nominal leaders. Another reason for forming the Coalition was for Croatia to have a post-Communist government of many different parties instead of one, which was supposed to help develop the nascent democracy and prevent eventual return to one-party rule.

It initially seemed that this plan by Dabčević-Kučar and Tripalo was working. The coalition was joined by a large number of parties - the centrist Croatian Social Liberal Party, moderate right-wing Croatian Democratic Party and Croatian Christian Democratic Party, as well as the nominally left-wing Social Democrats of Croatia (later merged with SDP), and a number of local, youth and environmentalist groups and individual candidates. Another boost came in the form of an open letter by some 200 top Croatian artists, scientists and intellectuals expressing support for the Coalition. However, it soon became apparent that the Coalition would have to compete not only with the Communist government, but also with the more radical Croatian Democratic Union (HDZ). The emerging nationalism in other parts of Yugoslavia (Slovenia, Bosnia-Herzegovina and Macedonia) garnered popularity for more radical parties.

Another obstacle for the Coalition was the runoff voting system, which favored the two strongest parties or electoral blocs. In the first round of the elections it became apparent that the reformed-communists, now rebranded into Social Democratic Party of Croatia, had enough support to finish second in most of the constituencies. Most of the Coalition candidates finished third, although many refused to abandon the race before the second round. In the end, only a small number of Coalition candidates was elected, 21 in all three houses (chambers) of parliament (Chamber of Municipalities, Socio-Political Chamber and Chamber of Associated Labour). HDZ won a majority in the Croatian Parliament, while SDP became the main opposition party.

The Coalition began to disintegrate. Dabčević-Kučar and Tripalo formed their own Croatian People's Party in the Fall of 1990.
