= Dalmatian Action (1990) =

Dalmatian Action Dalmatinska akcija
- Presidents: Đermano Senjanović (1990–1991); Mira Ljubić-Lorger (1991–2003)
- Founded: 16 December 1990
- Dissolved: 20 February 2003
- Ideology: Regionalism; Autonomism
- Political position: Centre-left

Dalmatian Action (Croatian: Dalmatinska akcija, DA) was a 1990s regionalist and autonomist party in the region of Dalmatia within Croatia, that advocated for the political autonomy of Dalmatia within Croatia, including the creation of a Dalmatian regional government with a legislative assembly, with autonomy over cultural issues involving Dalmatia. It was founded in December 1990. During the Croatian War of Independence, Croatian President Franjo Tuđman accused the DA of being an anti-Croat separatist organization in league with Serb separatists intent on breaking up Croatia, the DA responded to Tuđman's accusation by denying its validity, saying that it was only interested in autonomy, and said that an autonomous Dalmatia would be a beneficial means to end the Serbian aggression and terrorism of Serbs from self-proclaimed Krajina, as Dalmatian autonomy could insure Dalmatian Serbs' autonomy from the central government in Zagreb, as an alternative to Serb autonomy or independence.

In the 1992 Croatian parliamentary election, it won a seat in the Croatian Parliament, but failed to pass the threshold in subsequent elections.

On February 20, 2003, the Ministry of Justice erased the party from the register of political parties in Croatia, which was protested by the remaining party members including president Luka Meštrović and long-time member Mira Ljubić-Lorger.

The party journal Glas Dalmacije (lit. The Voice of Dalmatia) was published between 1994 and 2000.

== Election results ==
Dalmatian Action participated in elections on all levels.

=== Parliament ===
Election	Coalition	Votes	%	Seats	+/–
Election	Coalition	Coalition		DA	
1992	IDS - RiDS	83,623	3.18 (#7)	1 / 138	▲1
1995	none	13,405	0.54 (#17)	0 / 127	▼1
2000	none	6,388	0.22 (#19)	0 / 151	0

=== Chamber of Counties ===
Election	Coalition	Votes	%	Seats	+/–
Election	Coalition	Coalition		DA	
1993	none	26,303	1.18	0 / 68	0
1997	SDU	8,994	0.36	0 / 68	0

== See also ==
- Autonomism
- Autonomist Party (Dalmatia)
- Dalmatia
- Dalmatian Action (2021)
- Dalmatian National Party (1990)
- Dalmatianism
- Regionalism
