= Socialist Labour Party of Croatia =

Socialist Labour Party of Croatia Socijalistička radnička partija Hrvatske
- President: Kristofor Stokić (since 2021)
- Founder: Stipe Šuvar
- Founded: 25 October 1997
- Headquarters: Pavla Hatza 16, Zagreb, Croatia
- Newspaper: Socijalizam danas
- Youth wing: Young Socialists of Croatia
- Membership: 100
- Ideology: Democratic socialism Communism; Titoism; Euroscepticism
- Political position: Far-left
- European affiliation: INITIATIVE (until 2023); EACL
- International affiliation: IMCWP; World Anti-Imperialist Platform
- Colours: Red
- Sabor: 0 / 151
- European Parliament: 0 / 12
- County Prefects: 0 / 21
- Mayors: 0 / 128

Party flag

Website
- www.srp.hr

Socialist Labour Party of Croatia (Croatian: Socijalistička radnička partija Hrvatske or SRP lit. 'sickle') is a minor Titoist party in Croatia, also known as Socialist Workers' Party of Croatia. Their youth wing are the Young Socialists of Croatia (Croatian: Mladi Socijalisti Hrvatske).

== Ideology ==
The party identifies as the meeting point of many different leftist ideologies. It emphasizes the importance of worker self-management and participatory democracy. Socialist Labour Party supports new social movements; party delegates have supported Zagreb Pride and the union protests.

Defending the good name of Yugoslav resistance movement during the World War II is also one of the key issues. The Party also considers the Croatian War of Independence to have been one of the Yugoslav civil war rather than a war of independence, which is a unique position among parties in Croatia.

The youth section of SRP is called Young Socialists.

== Publications ==
The official paper is called Socijalizam danas (Socialism Today).

Party organization in Split publishes its own paper Gariful (The Carnation).

== History ==
The Party was formed in 1997 by a group of leftists gathered around the magazine called Hrvatska ljevica (Croatian Left) and its chief editor Stipe Šuvar. SRP filled a hole on the Croatian political left after the Social Democratic Union had lost influence and members and the Social Democratic Action moved more to the center.

The first election it contested was the 2000 parliamentary election. The party won 18,863 votes (0.66%).

After the elections, a group of members from the Socialist Youth, the party's youth wing, left to form Green Left of Croatia.

In the 2001 local elections SRP won some seats in smaller, ethnically mixed communities, such as Daruvar, Donji Lapac and Vrhovine.

The party ran in the following 2003 parliamentary election and got 15,515 votes (0,59%).

In 2004 Stipe Šuvar resigned as party president and was replaced by Ivan Plješa.

Shortly after, a minority of members left to form Socialist Party of Croatia - Left Alternative, mostly due to personal disputes. The activist core, including the youth wing and the entire editorial board of Hrvatska ljevica (which worked beside the late Stipe Šuvar) is still a part of the SRP.

On the local elections in 2005, SRP formed a joint list with Social Democratic Union, New Alternative Party - Green Movement, Green Left of Croatia and Green Party but did not win any seats in local or regional assemblies, although it came close in several cities such as Šibenik, Rijeka and Pula).

For the 2007 election it formed an alliance with the Left of Croatia. The alliance got 9 884 votes (0.4%). The party contested the 2011 election alone and won 5 177 votes (0.22%).

== Foreign relations ==
The Party attended several International Communist Seminars (ICS) hosted by the Workers' Party of Belgium and International Conference of Communist & Workers' Parties. The last ICS was held in 2014.The party is currently affiliated with the World Anti-Imperialist Platform. The party also contains a faction known as "Workers' Struggle" (Radnička borba) which is close to the reunified Fourth International.

== Electoral history ==
=== Legislative ===
Election	In coalition with	Votes won (coalition totals)	Percentage	Seats won	Change
2000	None	18,863	0.66%	0 / 151	Steady
2003	None	15,515	0.59%	0 / 151	Steady
2007	LH-HSD-ISDF	9,884	0.40%	0 / 151	Steady
2011	None	5,177	0.22%	0 / 151	Steady
2015	None	2,528	0.12%	0 / 151	Steady
2016	None	3,672	0.19%	0 / 151	Steady
2020	None	2,149	0.13%	0 / 151	Steady
2024	None	1,206	0.06%	0 / 151	Steady

=== European Parliament ===
Election	In coalition with	Votes won (coalition totals)	Percentage	Seats won	Change
2013	None	3,538	0.48%	0 / 12	Steady
2014	None	1,769	0.19%	0 / 11	Steady
2019	RF	2,622	0.24%	0 / 12	Steady

== See also ==
- Young Socialists of Croatia
- Left of Croatia
- Hrvatska ljevica
- Novi Plamen
- League of Communists of Yugoslavia
- Serbian Party of Socialists (Croatia)
- Socialist Party of Croatia – Left Alternative
- Socialist Party of Croatia
- Social Democratic Union (Croatia)
