= Jerolim Kavanjin =

Venetian-Croatian poet

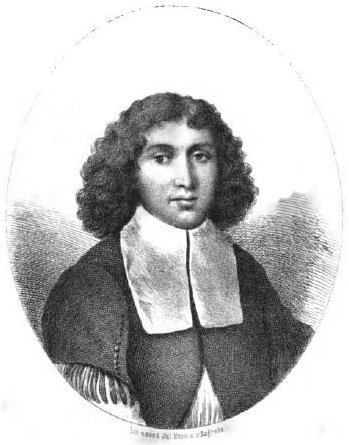
- Born: 4 February 1641; Spalato, Republic of Venice
- Died: 29 November 1714 (aged 73); Spalato, Republic of Venice
- Occupation: poet

Jerolim Kavanjin, also known as Girolamo Cavagnini (4 February 1641 – 29 November 1714), was a Venetian poet from Spalato (now Split, Croatia) who wrote in the Croatian language.

== Biography ==
Kavanjin was born into a wealthy and noble family of Split, as a descendant of the Croaticised Italian family Cavagnini. Kavanjin rose to prominence at the same time as Ignjat Đurđević at the beginning of the 18th century. He was married to the sister of John Peter Marchi. In 1703, Kavanjin became a member of the Illyrian Academy Marchi founded in 1703.

In his summer mansion on Sutivan, on the island of Brač, where he retired after military and legislative careers, Kavanjin wrote the most voluminous poetical work in the whole of Croatian literature, with approximately 32,500 verses: Poviest vanđelska bogatoga a nesretna Epuluna i ubogoga a čestita Lazara, usually referred to by the later editors, according to the subtitle in the original, as Bogatstvo i uboštvo ("Riches and Poverty"). This religious-philosophical epic is poetically inconsistent but stylistically marked (it is written, beside Split Čakavian, in Ijekavian–Ikavian Štokavian).

Expressing the spirit of philosophical movements of the 17th and 18th centuries, this "encyclopædia in verses" (Josip Aranza) directs its Baroque spirituality towards the cogitation on life and human essentiality in the dual nature of the human and the divine.

Beside the classical humanistic, Latinate, and Italian literatures (such as Dante), the Bible and other religious writings, and beside the historical authors (such as Constantine Porphyrogenitus, priest of Duklja, Mavro Orbini), writings of the Old Dubrovnik have constituted the basic Kavanjin's reading list, above others Junije Palmotić and Ivan Gundulić.

Kavanjin identified with Slavs and Dalmatia. John Fine interprets his pan-Slavism and Dalmatianism to have been close to an ethnic notion.

Kavanjin died in Split, aged 73.

== Sources ==
- Fališevac, Dunja; Nemec, Krešimir; Novaković, Darko (2000), Leksikon hrvatskih pisaca (in Croatian), Zagreb: Školska knjiga d.d, ISBN 953-0-61107-2
- Božić-Bužančić, Danica (October 1999). "Ivan Petar Marchi-Markić: njegovo djelovanje i njegova oporuka" (PDF). Radovi Zavoda za povijesne znanosti HAZU u Zadru (in Croatian) (41). Zavod povijesti znanosti HAZU: 181–202.
