= Zdravko Tomac =

Croatian politician (1937–2020)

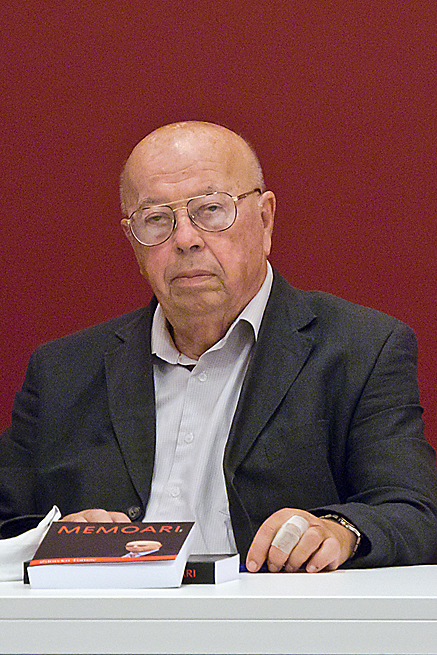
- Tomac on 6 September 2013

Deputy Prime Minister of Croatia
- In office 31 July 1991 – 26 June 1992
- Prime Minister: Franjo Gregurić
- Preceded by: Bernardo Jurlina
- Succeeded by: Vladimir Šeks

Personal details
- Born: 24 May 1937 Garčin, Kingdom of Yugoslavia (modern Croatia)
- Died: 4 January 2020 (aged 82) Zagreb, Croatia
- Party: League of Communists of Croatia (until 1991); Social Democratic Party of Croatia (until 2003)

Zdravko Tomac (24 May 1937 – 4 January 2020) was a Croatian politician.

A native of Slavonski Brod, Zdravko Tomac began his political career in the Communist Party of Yugoslavia. There he rose through the ranks, becoming a close associate of Jakov Blažević. In late 1980s he became one of the chief ideologists of the League of Communists of Croatia and one of the closest associates of Ivica Račan.

After the Croatian Communist Party rebranded itself into Social Democratic Party of Croatia and lost the 1990 parliamentary elections, Tomac worked very hard to steer the party towards the nationalist course close to Franjo Tuđman and the ruling Croatian Democratic Union. Because of that, Tomac became deputy prime minister in the wartime "National Unity" government of Franjo Gregurić, thus becoming one of the first top Communist officials in Eastern Europe to return to a top executive post after the fall of the Berlin Wall. He served as deputy prime minister from August 1991 to June 1992.

Because of that, many in the Croatian public saw Tomac as just another of many former Communist officials who discarded their former ideology in order to embrace Croatian nationalism. The only difference was in Tomac choosing to remain within the former Communist Party. This served the SDP very well, which made Tomac into one of their most prominent members and thus gained enough nationalist credentials to improve its electoral chances in the long run.

Tomac showed this potential in the 1995 Croatian parliamentary election by winning a Sabor seat in Zagreb and later serving as a Zagreb City Assembly speaker and informal opposition leader during the Zagreb Crisis.

Two years later he ran as an SDP candidate at the 1997 Croatian presidential election. Although Tomac failed to unseat Tuđman, he scored an important victory for himself and his party by finishing second with 21.0% of the vote. He came out on top of former dissident Vladimir Gotovac and the Croatian Social Liberal Party. With the SDP established as the top opposition party in Croatia, it had the upper hand in the negotiations that would lead to the 1998 pre-election pact with HSLS and victory at the 2000 Croatian parliamentary election.

The 2000 triumph proved to be the beginning of Tomac's political decline. Soon after the parliamentary elections, Croatia had elections for president. The SDP endorsed Dražen Budiša as its candidate and appointed Tomac to be his campaign manager. What looked like a formality turned into a very unpredictable and increasingly vicious contest when Stjepan Mesić joined the fray. When the contest got narrowed to Budiša and Mesić, Tomac began to pander to nationalist and right-wing voters. This didn't have much effect and Mesić got easily elected, with Tomac's position within the party and the new government becoming increasingly marginalised.

As time went by, Tomac began to drift from Račan and the SDP. He began to criticise ICTY and bitterly oppose extradition of Croatian generals to Hague. Finally, in September 2003 he formally announced his departure from the SDP.

He founded a new party called Croatian Social Democrats (Croatian: Hrvatski socijaldemokrati), but this party, even after being allied with a few small right-wing parties, failed to enter the Zagreb City Assembly in the 2005 local elections.

On January 4, 2020, Tomac died in Dubrava Clinical Hospital after a short, severe illness.

== Works ==
- Predsjednik protiv predsjednika, 2005
- Tuđmanizam i mesićizam - predsjednik protiv predsjednika, 2. dio, 2007
- Obraćenje - od komunista do vjernika, 2008
