= Young Socialists (Croatia) =

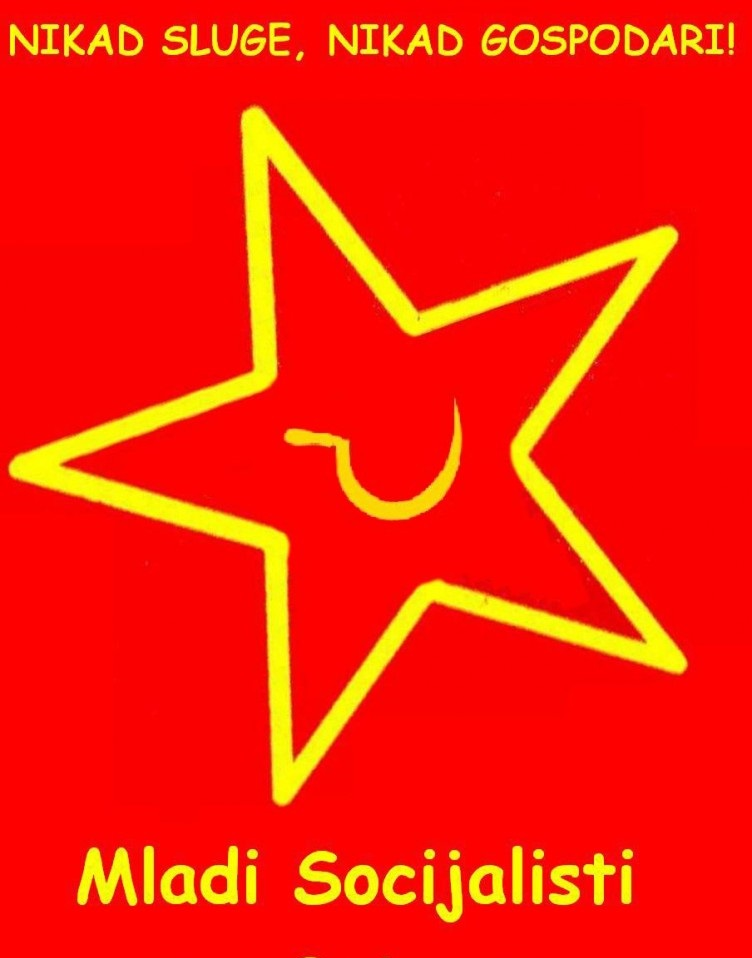
Young Socialists Logo

The Young Socialists of Croatia (Croatian: Mladi Socijalisti Hrvatske) is a socialist youth organization of the Socialist Labour Party of Croatia (Croatian: Socijalistička radnička partija Hrvatske or SRP).

== Program ==
The Young Socialists are in favor of abolishing capitalism and establishing workers' self-management and socialism in Croatia and demanding that it leave the European Union and NATO.

The Young Socialists oppose discrimination, describe themselves as feminists and support pride parades throughout Croatia.

== Organisation ==
The members of the organisation are between 15 and 35 years of age.

The Young Socialists of Croatia is chaired by a three-member executive committee, elected at the assembly with a term of office of 2 years, and an elected member sits in the SRP presidency.

The motto of the organization is "Never Slaves, Never Masters!" (Croatian: Nikad sluge, nikad gospodari!)

== History ==
The Young Socialists of Croatia were founded as the "Young Democratic Left" in 1997.

They changed their name to "Young Socialists of Croatia" in 2001.

They became full members of the World Federation of Democratic Youth in 2019.

== See also ==
- Socialist Labour Party of Croatia
- League of Communist Youth of Yugoslavia
