= Dalmatian identity =

Nationalism or patriotism of Dalmatians

Flag and coat of arms of Dalmatia

Dalmatian identity, or sometimes also Dalmatianism, Dalmatianness or Dalmatian nationalism, refers to the historical nationalism or patriotism of Dalmatians and Dalmatian culture. There were significant Dalmatian nationalists in the 19th century, but Dalmatian regional nationalism faded in significance over time in favor of ethnic nationalism of Croats, Italians, Vlachs and Serbs who inhabited the area, encouraged by Italy and Austria and, later, by the Kingdom of Yugoslavia and its successor, the Federal Yugoslavia. Dalmatian poet Jerolim Kavanjin (Girolamo Cavagnini) exhibited Dalmatianism, identifying himself as "Dalmatian" and calling Dalmatia his homeland, which John Fine interprets not to have been a nationalist notion.

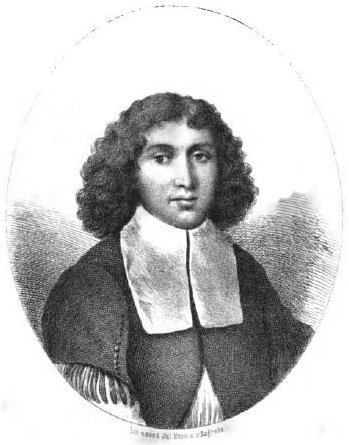
Jerolim Kavanjin, a Dalmatian poet who supported Dalmatianism

During Dalmatia's incorporation into Austrian Empire, the Autonomist Party in Dalmatia refused and actively opposed plans to incorporate Dalmatia into wider Croatian Triune Kingdom within the Empire along with Croatia and Slavonia; instead it supported an autonomous Dalmatia based on a multicultural association of "ethnic Dalmatians" with other Dalmatia's self-identified ethnic communities: Croats, Serbs, and Italians, united as Dalmatians. The Autonomist Party has been accused of secretly having been a pro-Italian movement due to their defense of the rights of ethnic Italians in Dalmatia. The support for autonomy had historic roots in the belief that Dalmatian culture served as a link between Western Christian culture via Venetian Italian influence and Eastern Orthodox culture via South Slavic influence, such a view was supported by Dalmatian autonomist Stipan Ivičević. The Autonomist Party did not claim to be an Italian movement, and indicated that it sympathized with a sense of heterogeneity amongst Dalmatians in opposition to ethnic nationalism. In the 1861 elections, the Autonomists won twenty-seven seats in Dalmatia, while Dalmatia's Croatian nationalist movement, the People's Party, won only fourteen seats.

The issue of autonomy of Dalmatia was debated after the creation of Yugoslavia in 1918, due to divisions within Dalmatia over proposals of merging the region with the territories composing the former Kingdom of Croatia-Slavonia. Proposals for the autonomy of Dalmatia within Yugoslavia were made by some Dalmatian Partisans who served among Yugoslav Partisans during World War II; however, these proposals were strongly opposed by Croatian Communists as a whole and the proposals were soon abandoned.

== Dalmatian National Party ==
Dalmatian National Party (Croatian: Dalmatinska nacionalna stranka) was a political organisation in Croatia (despite its name, it was not registered as a political party) which promoted revival of Dalmatian language and creation of autonomous region of Dalmatia in Dalmatia and Quarnaro islands region.

== See also ==
- Istrian identity
- Autonomist Party (Dalmatia)
- Croatian nationalism
- Dalmatia
- Dalmatian Action (DA) and Dalmatian National Party (DNP), political parties that supported the autonomy of Dalmatia within Croatia in the 1990s.
