= John Peter Marchi =

Venetian jurist (1663–1733)

- Born: Ivan Petar Marki (Markić); 1663; Republic of Venice
- Died: 1733 (aged 69–70)
- Other name: Giovanni Pietro Marchi
- Occupation: Jurist
- Years active: 1680–1733
- Known for: Illyrian Academy

John Peter Marchi (Italian: Giovanni Pietro Marchi, Serbo-Croatian: Ivan Petar Marki; 1663–1733) was a Venetian jurist, member of the Split nobility and founder and president of the Illyrian Academy (Academia Illyrika iliti vam Slovinska). Marchi supported and worked for the liberation of the Sanjak of Bosnia from the Ottoman Empire and conversion of its population to Catholicism.

== Early life ==
After he received his PhD in law in Padua in 1680, Marchi returned to Split, where he was a judge and legal advisor. He was librarian of the library of Ivan Paštrić.

== Marchi noble family ==
Marchi was the most notable member of the Marchi noble family. In 1728, he received certificate which confirmed his Roman nobility membership.

== Illyrian Academy ==
Marchi was founder, president and member of the Illyrian Academy (Academia Illyrika iliti vam Slovinska). Marchi's intention was to support the capture of the Sanjak of Bosnia from Ottoman Empire and conversion of its population to Catholicism. He believed that Eastern Orthodox Slavs from Bosnia would convert to the religion of the new lord of Bosnia.

== Sources ==
- hrvatska (1952). Hrvatsko kolo. Matica hrvatska.
- Ljubić, Šime (1869). Ogledalo književne poviesti jugoslavjanske na podučavanje mladeži.
- Matica (1998). Mogućnosti. Matica hrvatska, Split.
- Zavod (1960). Pregled istorije jugoslovenskih naroda: Ot najstarijih vremena do 1848. Zavod za izdavanje Republike Scbije.
- Božić-Bužančić, Danica (1969). Inventar arhiva stare splitske općine. Historijski arhiv.
- Vjesnik (1967). Vjesnik bibliotekara Hrvatske.
- Zemaljska (1897). Nada. Zemaljska stamparija.
- Fine, John V. A. Jr. (1 January 2006). When Ethnicity Did Not Matter in the Balkans: A Study of Identity in Pre-Nationalist Croatia, Dalmatia, and Slavonia in the Medieval and Early-Modern Periods. University of Michigan Press. ISBN 0-472-02560-0.
- Božić-Bužančić, Danica (1999). Ivan Petar Marchi-Markić:Njegovo djelovanje i njegova oporuka. Zavod Povijesti Znanosti HAZU.
