= Socialist Party of Croatia =

Socialist Party of Croatia (Croatian: Socijalistička stranka Hrvatske or Socijalistički savez Hrvatske - Savez socijalista Hrvatske, SSH) was a left-wing political party in Croatia.

Before the arrival of multi-party democracy to Croatia, SSH existed as Socialist League of Working People of Croatia (Croatian: Socijalistički savez radnog naroda Hrvatske, SSRNH), mass-umbrella organisation for all political organisations other than Croatian Communist Party. Before the 1990 parliamentary elections, SSRNH rebranded itself into SSH, just like Communists rebranded themselves into Social Democratic Party of Croatia. At the election, two parties acted as a bloc and ultimately lost.

While SDP continued to exist nominally as the strongest opposition in Parliament, SSH, after losing its reason for existence, began to slowly fade away.

It was briefly reinvigorated when prominent Zagreb attorney Silvije Degen took leadership and ran as relatively successful candidate during the 1992 presidential elections.

The SSH should not be mistaken for Socialist Party of Croatia - Left Alternative (Croatian: Socijalistička partija Hrvatske), which had been formed by people around Stipe Šuvar, at the time a dissident of Socialist Labour Party of Croatia.

Their successors are Social Democratic Action of Croatia, formed in 1994.

== See also ==
- Social Democratic Party of Croatia
- Serbian Party of Socialists (Croatia)
- Socialist Labour Party of Croatia
- Socialist Party of Croatia – Left Alternative
- Social Democratic Union (Croatia)
- Action of Social Democrats of Croatia
- Left of Croatia
- Hrvatska ljevica
- Novi Plamen
