= Istrian Social Democratic Forum =

Istrian Social Democratic Forum Istarski socijaldemokratski forum Foro social democratico istriano
- Leader: Frane Milat
- Founder: Luciano Delbianco
- Founded: 14 December 1996
- Split from: Istrian Democratic Assembly
- Headquarters: Pula
- Ideology: Social democracy Istrian regionalism

Website
- www.isdf-fsdi.hr

Istrian Socialdemocratic Forum (Croatian: Istarski socijaldemokratski forum, ISDF, Italian: Foro social democratico Istriano, FSDI) is a regional left-wing political party in Istria County of Croatia.

It was founded by dissident faction of Istrian Democratic Assembly and firstly it was named Istrian Democratic Forum, led by Luciano Delbianco, former prefect of Istria County.

In the past, it has usually been allied with Social Democratic Party of Croatia, but is currently allied with a number of small leftist parties, such as the Left of Croatia.

== Electoral history ==
=== Legislative ===
Election	In coalition with	Votes won (coalition totals)	Percentage	Seats won	Change
2003	None	5,685	0.23%	0 / 151	Steady
2007	SRP-LH-HSD	9,884	0.40%	0 / 151	Steady

== Sources ==
- Istarski demokratski forum (IDF) (in Croatian)
