= Šime Ljubić =

Austrian Croat theologian, archeologist and historian

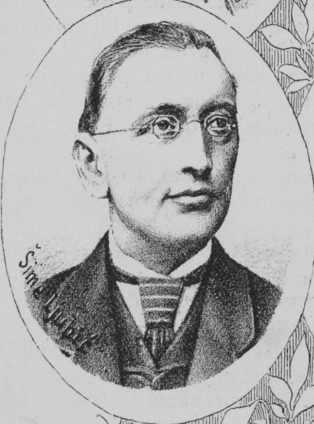
- Šime Ljubić
- Born: 24 May 1822; Stari Grad, Croatia, Austrian Empire
- Died: 19 October 1896 (aged 74); Stari Grad, Croatia, Austria-Hungary
- Occupations: archaeologist, theologian, historian

Šime Ljubić (24 May 1822 – 19 October 1896) was an archaeologist, theologian, and historian, best known as one of the founders of Croatian archaeology.

Ljubić studied theology in Zagreb and history and Slavic studies in Vienna. He was the director of the Split Archaeological Museum and collected materials from the Archives of Venice that were later published by the Yugoslav Academy of Sciences and Arts. Later he was director of the Archaeological Museum in Zagreb. He founded the Croatian Archaeological Society and its publication, Viestnik hrvatskoga areheologičkoga družtva.

Ljubić wrote about ancient numismatics, prehistoric and Roman finds, Marco Antonio de Dominis, Petar Hektorović, and the relations between the republics of Ragusa and Venice. He collected objects for the National Museum and published the medieval statutes of Budva, Skradin, and Hvar. He participated in the Illyrian movement in Dalmatia and wrote fiction.

== Works ==
- Numografia Dalmata, 1853
- Dizionario biografico degli uomini illustri della Dalmazia, 1856
- Studi archeologici sulla Dalmazia, 1860
- Pregled hrvatske poviesti, 1864
- Ob odnošajih dubrovačke sa mletačkom republikom tja do godine 1358, 1868
- Ogledalo književne poviesti jugoslavjanske na podučavanje mladeži, 1869
- Ustrojstvo narodnoga zemaljskoga muzeja u Zagrebu, 1870
- Kollerova egjipatska sbirka, 1870
- Stari novci, 1870
- O jednom spomeniku rimsko-kršćanske dobe skoro nadjenom u okolici trogirskoj u Dalmaciji, 1870
- Dometak k izjasnenju trogirske olovne ploče, 1870
- Narodni zemaljski muzej u Zagrebu, 1870
- Listine o odnošajih izmedju južnoga slavenstva i Mletačke Republike, 1870
- Spomenici o Šćepanu Malom, 1870
- Petar Hektorović, 1874
- Kamenita doba (Steinzeit), 1876
- Bakrena doba (Bronzezeit), 1876
- Gvozdena doba (Eisenzeit), 1876
- Inscriptiones quae Zagrabiae in Museo Nationali, 1876
- Der Fund romischer Goldmunzen aus dem ersten Jahrhunderte der Kaiserzeit, 1876
- Uvod, 1879
- Dragulj iz predhistoričke dobe, 1879
- Biač (ulomak iz arkeol. putopisa 1873.), 1879
- Rittium (Surduk), 1879
- Još dvie zavjetne ruke iz bronca, 1879
- Kip morske boginje s jednozubnim sidrom, 1879
- Predhistorička Venus, 1879
- Pisani spomenici izkopani u Sisku od arkeol. družtva 'Siscia' tečajem god. 1878., 1880
- Topusko (Ad fines) I and II, 1879–1880
- Nadpisi I and II, 1879–1880
- Nekoliko glagolskih nadpisa iz Grižana u Vinodolu, 1880
- Nadpisi koji su došli ili će doći u zemaljski muzej, 1880
- Panonski kipari za cara Galerija, 1880
- Arkeologičke crtice iz moga putovanja po njekojih predjelih Podravine i Zagorja god. 1879., 1880
- Primjetbe na "prilog tumačenju dragulja" I, II and III, 1880
- Nabave arkeolog. odiela zem. muzeja, 1880
- Rimski novci carski zem. muzeja u Zagrebu I, II, III and IV, 1879–1880
- Statuta Et Leges Civitatis Buduae, Civitatis Scardonae, Et Civitatis Et Insulae Lesinae, 1882
- Index Rerum, Personarum Et Locorum, 1893

== Gallery ==
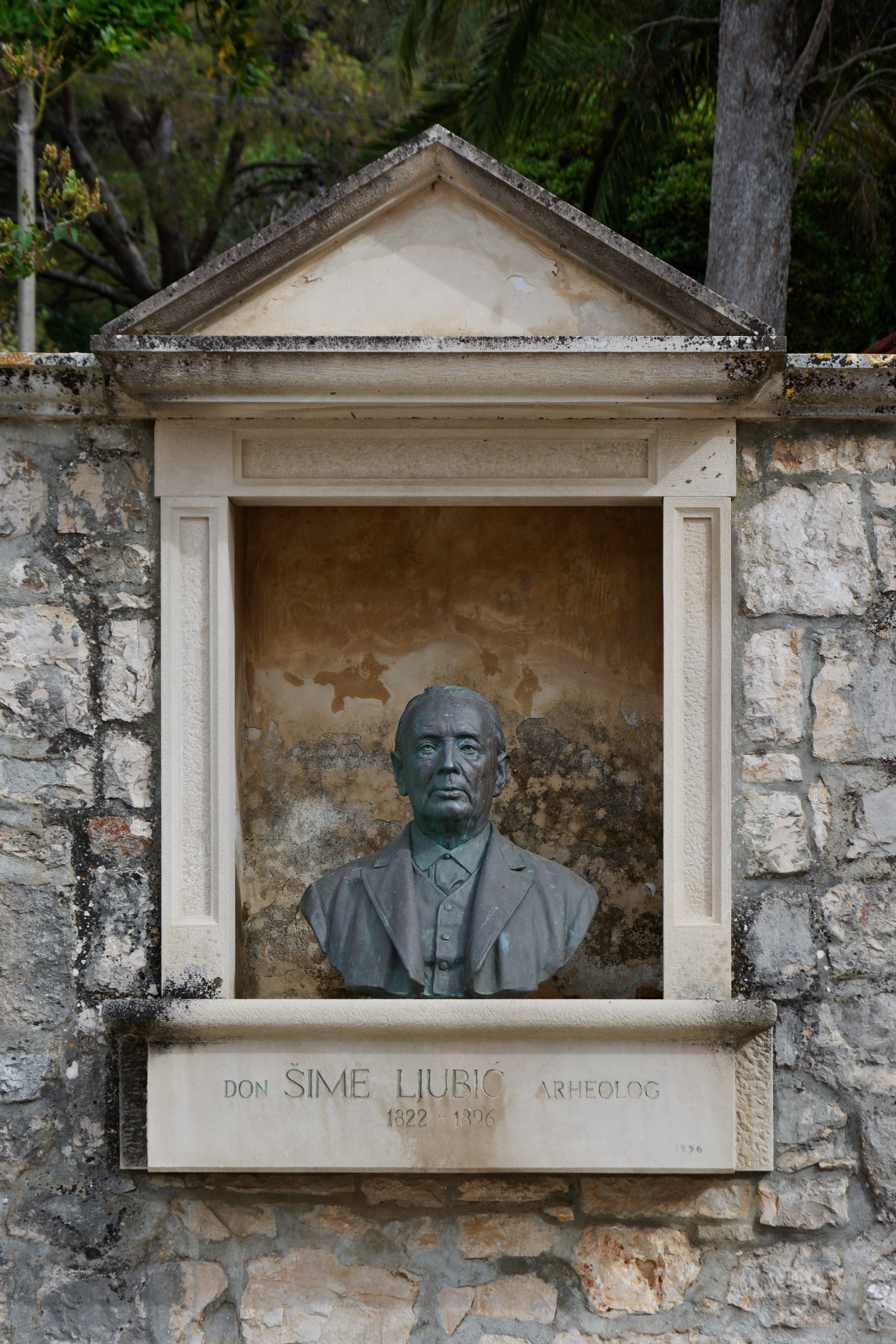
Bust

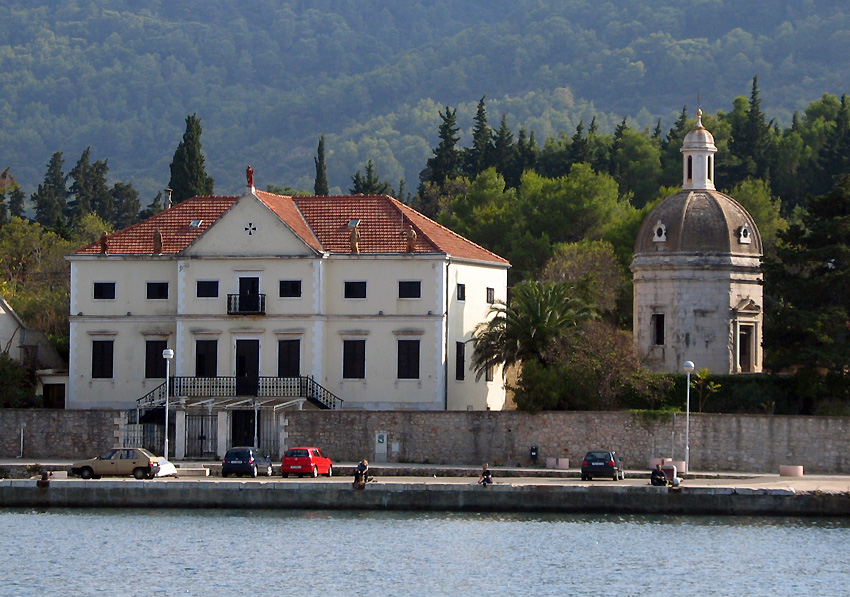
Ljubić's house and mausoleum in Stari Grad on Island of Hvar

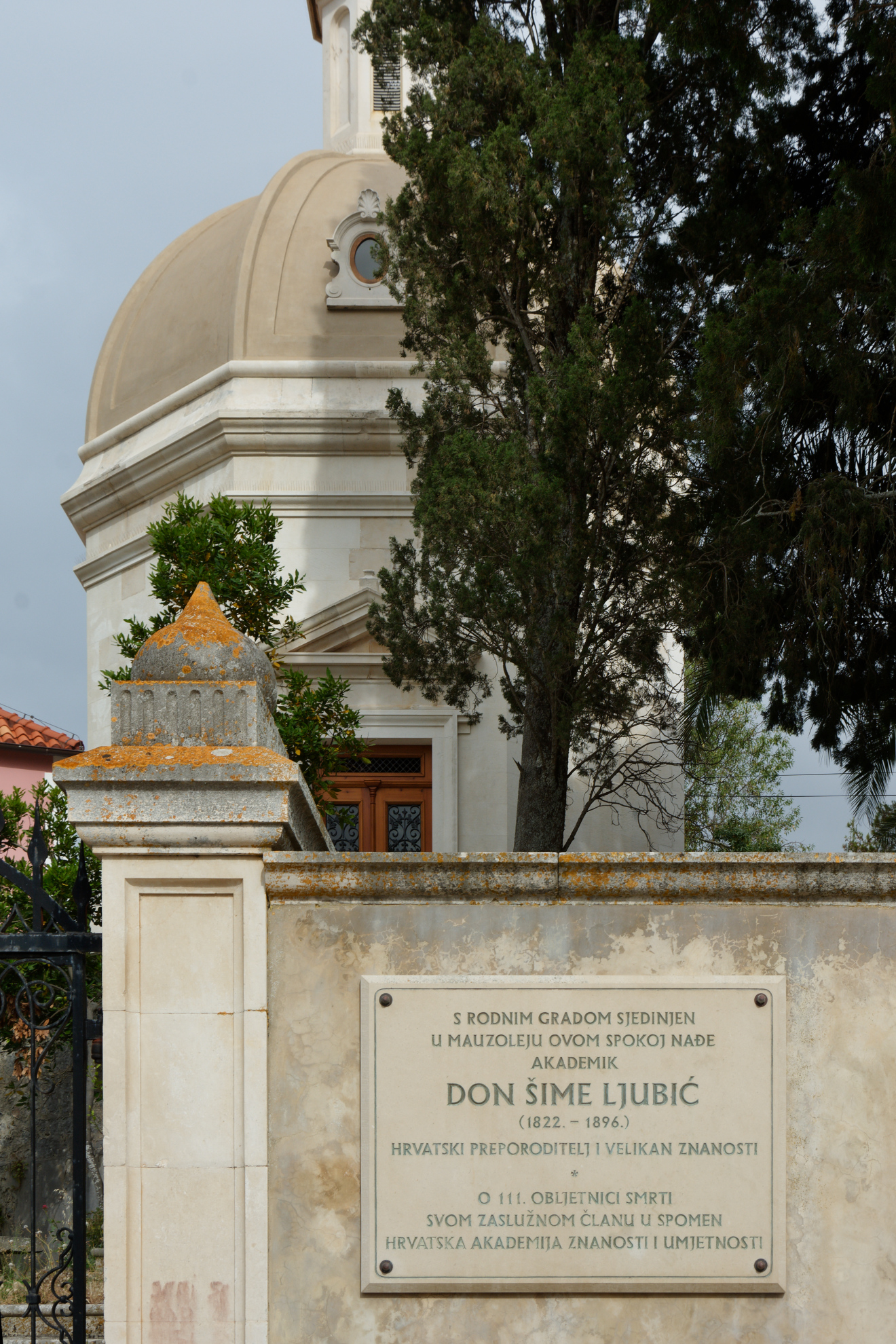
Memorial plaque

== Sources ==
- Šime Ljubić-utemeljitelj Hrvatskog arheološkog društva. JAZU. 1981.
