= Dalmatian National Party (1990) =

Dalmatian National Party Dalmatinska Narodna Stranka
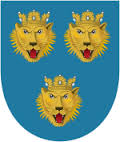
- Abbreviation: DNS
- Founded: 1990s
- Ideology: Regionalism; Autonomism

The Dalmatian National Party (Croatian: Dalmatinska narodna stranka, DNS) was a political party founded in the region of Dalmatia within Croatia. It was a radical regionalist party run by citizens who called Dalmatia their homeland. It held similar stances to the Dalmatian autonomist party, Dalmatian Action (DA) Like the DA, it complained about Croatian President Franjo Tuđman's centralized state, and demanded that Dalmatia regain its status as a special region within Croatia.

== See also ==
- Dalmatia
- Dalmatian Action
- Dalmatianism
