= Left of Croatia =

Left of Croatia Ljevica Hrvatske
- President: Ivan Ninić
- Founded: 16 November 2001
- Headquarters: Rijeka
- Ideology: Democratic socialism (constitutional position); Anti-fascism; Left-wing populism
- Political position: Left-wing
- Colours: Red

The Left of Croatia (Croatian: Ljevica Hrvatske) was a marginal leftist Croatian political party with no parliamentary representation.

== Origins ==
Left of Croatia was created in 2007 by the merger of several parties:

- Vladimir Bebić – Third Block
- Green Left of Croatia
- Social Democratic Union
- Dalmatian Assembly
- Olive
- Socialist Party of Croatia – Left Alternative
- Ivan Ninić, an SDP dissident

=== Social Democratic Union ===
The Social Democratic Union (Croatian: Socijalnodemokratska unija) was founded in 1992, following Croatian independence, being one of very few political parties to identify itself as left-wing. Most of their members were former Communists or left-wingers displeased embracing Croatian nationalism, the excesses of privatisation and human rights abuses of ethnic minorities. The first leader of the party was Branko Horvat, noted economist and one of the few Croatian intellectuals to oppose the dissolution of SFR Yugoslavia. In the early 1990s, the SDU was also one of the few political parties to openly advocate co-operation and integration of Croatia with other republics of former Yugoslavia, a view very different from the current Croatian political mainstream. In the 1992 parliamentary elections it turned out that SDU nevertheless enjoyed some degree of support, especially among ethnic Serbs living in government-controlled territories. Although it failed to break the 2% vote threshold of entry into the Croatian Parliament, the SDU could have hoped to win three seats by fulfilling the constitutional quota of ethnic Serbs in Sabor. Instead, the Croatian Constitutional Court, in one of the most controversial decisions in their history, ruled that the seats should go to Serb People's Party as an "ethnic party", and presumably the only true representative of ethnic Serb minority, despite the fact SNS won fewer votes than SDU.

The SDU had some success in the local elections held a few months later, but the biggest boost came to them with parliamentary status gained when Vladimir Bebić, a colorful member of Sabor from Rijeka, decided to join their ranks. Bebić, who enjoyed a great deal of popularity in the Croatian public, gradually became the party's leader. In the 1995 election he managed to increase the SDU's vote margin, but with increased vote threshold (5%), the SDU failed to enter Sabor. This, the appearance of more mainstream left-wing parties, and the establishment of a rejuvenated SDP as Croatia's main opposition party, led to the SDU becoming more marginalized, struck with internal divisions and gradually phased out in late 1990s. After the Socialist Labour Party of Croatia (SRP) was formed, many SDU members joined that organization.

The SDU formed joint lists for local elections in 2005 with the SRP, the Green Party and the Green Left of Croatia, but failed to enter any of the regional assemblies.

=== Socialist Party of Croatia – Left Alternative ===
The Socialist Party of Croatia – Left Alternative (Croatian: Socijalistička partija Hrvatske - lijeva alternativa) was a leftist party formed in 2004 when several members left the Socialist Labour Party of Croatia. In the local elections of 2005, the party had joint lists with the Social Democratic Party of Croatia in the town of Glina and with the Independent Democratic Serb Party in Sisak-Moslavina County, where it gained one seat in the assembly.

=== Green Left of Croatia ===
The Green Left of Croatia (Croatian: Zelena ljevica Hrvatske) was a leftist party formed in 2001 whose political platform was ecological socialism.

On the local elections in 2005, it formed a joint list with the Social Democratic Union and two other green parties. The coalition got 0.39% vote in Zagreb. It ceased to exist in 2006 and in 2007 merged into the Left of Croatia.

== Ideology ==
The Party sees itself as the protector of the workers and other disadvantaged parts of society. It considers the privatization process in the nineties after the breakup of Yugoslavia to be criminal and supports free education and healthcare. Anti-fascism is declared to be one of basis of the party. The party claims to support small business in competition with “foreign capital”. It also supports EU membership and gay rights, and opposes NATO membership. The Left aims to present itself as a strongly anti-corruption party.

== Leadership ==
The Party is led by Croatian politician and former athlete Ivan Ninić, a former MP.

Before his death in 2009, a prominent leader was Vladimir Bebić, another former MP.

== Local representation ==
Ljevica was represented in the council of Rijeka by two councillors and by three in assembly of Primorje-Gorski Kotar County. All were elected from the electoral list "Vladimir Bebić – Third Block list on the 2005 local elections.

== 2007 elections ==
Soon after its founding congress, the party announced a joint list with Istrian Social Democratic Forum and Croatian Social Democrats in Istria and Rijeka.

The Left also announced a coalition with Socialist Labour Party of Croatia one month before the elections.

== 2009 local elections ==
For the 2009 local elections in Rijeka, Ljevica joined with the Independent Democratic Serb Party and the Women's Democratic Party for the Zagreb local elections.

== Electoral history ==
Election	In coalition with	Votes won (coalition totals)	Percentage	Seats won	Change
2007	SRP-HSD-ISDF	9,884	0.40%	0 / 151	Steady

== See also ==
- Hrvatska ljevica
- Novi Plamen
- Social Democratic Party of Croatia
- Socialist Labour Party of Croatia
- Socialist Party of Croatia
- Social Democratic Action of Croatia
