= 2026 Split district elections =

- 27 September 2026
- Turnout: 4.82% (▼6.88pp)
	First party	Second party	Third party
Leader	Tomislav Šuta	Marijana Puljak	Ante Lozo
Party	HDZ	Centre	DOMiNO
Alliance	HDZ–DP	Centre, SDP, Možemo!, Direkt	DOMiNO, HS, HSP
Seats won	136	39	6
Seat change	▲13	▼28	new

Elections were held in Split, Croatia, on 27 September 2026 for the councils of 34 city districts and local committees of Split. The results were a landslide victory for the ruling Croatian Democratic Union (HDZ) of mayor Tomislav Šuta. HDZ, with partner DP, won a majority in 19 districts, the centre-left coalition led by Centar did so in four districts, while independent lists won majorities in 8 districts.

== Candidates ==
The Electoral Commission for the implementation of elections for council members of local committees and city districts in Split published valid candidate lists on 2 September 2026.

Party	Lists	Candidates
HDZ, DP	34	238
Centre, SDP, Možemo!, Direkt	17	119
DOMiNO, HS, HSP	8	56
HSU	1	7
HSS	1	7
Independents	15 (Note: There were two independent lists in Neslanovac)	105
Total	76	532

== Results ==
Distribution of seats per district
District	HDZ - DP	Centre - SDP - Možemo! - Direkt	DOMiNO - HSP - HS	SJN!	Independent lists	Others
Bačvice	2	2	1	–	2 (Note: List of Tomislav Zaninović)	–
Blatine-Škrape	7	–	–	–	–	–
Bol	4	3	–	–	–	–
Brda	7	–	–	–	–	–
Grad	4	3	–	–	–	–
Gripe	2	5	–	–	–	–
Kman	3	–	1	–	3 (Note: List of Marko Pavić)	–
Kocunar	3	–	–	–	4 (Note: List of Josip Dodoja)	–
Lokve	2	1	–	–	4 (Note: List of Damir Lolić)	–
Lovret	3	4	–	–	–	–
Lučac-Manuš	3	4	–	–	–	–
Mejaši	4	–	3	–	–	–
Meje	3	1	–	–	3 (Note: List of Pjero Baranović)	–
Mertojak	4	3	–	–	–	–
Neslanovac	4	–	–	–	3 (Note: List of Ante Popović 3; List of Tonći Seser 0)	–
Plokite	5	2	–	–	–	–
Pujanke	4	1	0	–	2 (Note: List of Marin Borzić)	–
Ravne njive	3	–	–	–	4 (Note: List of Ante Leskur)	–
Sirobuja	1	–	–	1	5 (Note: List of Ivica Grubišić)	–
Spinut	1	0	–	–	6 (Note: List of Luka Kovač Levantin)	–
Split 3	4	3	0	–	–	–
Sućidar	4	–	–	0	3 (Note: List of Damir Ćosić Roda)	–
Šine	4	–	–	3	–	–
Trstenik	2	5	0	–	–	–
Varoš	2	–	–	–	4 (Note: List of Ante Banović)	1 (Note: HSU)
Visoka	7	0 (Note: Centar ran alone in this district)	0	–	–	–
Žnjan	4	2	1	–	–	–
Donje Sitno	7	–	–	–	–	–
Gornje Sitno	2	–	–	–	5 (Note: List of Jaska Peričić)	–
Kamen	7	–	–	–	–	–
Slatine	7	–	–	–	–	–
Srinjine	7	–	–	–	–	–
Stobreč	7	–	–	–	–	–
Žrnovnica	3	–	–	–	4 (Note: List of Špirko Vlajić)	0 (Note: HSS)
Totals	136	39	6	4	48	1
Results: City Election Commission

== See also ==
- 2022 Split local elections
- 2025 Split local elections
