= 2022 Split district elections =

Local elections in Croatia

- 4 September 2022
- Turnout: 11.70% (+0.22 pp)
	First party	Second party	Third party
Leader	Vice Mihanović	Damir Barbir	Ivica Puljak
Party	HDZ	SDP	Centre
Alliance	HDZ-HNS	SDP-Možemo-NL-HSU
Seats won	108	33	34
Seat change	▼14	▼9	▲23
Popular vote	5,760	2,995	2,792
Percentage	33.64%	17.49%	16.31%

Elections were held in Split, Croatia, on 4 September 2022 for the councils of 27 city districts and seven local committees of Split.

== Candidates ==
The Electoral Commission for the implementation of elections for council members of local committees and city districts in the area of the City of Split published valid candidate lists on August 8, 2022.

Party	Lists	Candidates
HDZ-led coalition	34	238
DP-led coalition	21	147
SDP-led coalition	17	119
Centar	17	119
Most	2	14
PSD	1	7
HSS	1	7
Independents	14 (Note: Meje and Varoš has two independents list each)	98
Total	107	749

== Results ==
Distribution of seats per district
District	HDZ - HNS	Centar	SDP - Možemo - NL - HSU	DP - HDS - HSP - HS	PSD	Most	HSS	Independent
Bačvice	1	3	0	1	–	–	–	2 (Note: Ind. list of Tomislav Zaninović)
Blatine-Škrape	2	–	5	0	–	–	–	–
Bol	1	3	1	2	–	–	–	–
Brda	4	1	–	1	–	1	–	–
Grad	2	–	1	–	–	–	–	4 (Note: Ind. list of Marin Krpetić)
Gripe	1	2	4	–	–	–	–	–
Kman	1	–	–	1	–	–	–	5 (Note: Ind. list of Marko Pavić)
Kocunar	4	–	3	–	–	–	–	–
Lokve	2	–	1	0	–	–	–	4 (Note: Ind. list of Damir Lolić)
Lovret	2	1	1	0	–	–	–	3 (Note: Ind. list of Jerko Marinić Kragić)
Lučac-Manuš	1	2	2	0	2	–	–	–
Mejaši	5	–	–	2	–	–	–	–
Meje	2	1	–	1	–	–	–	3 (Note: Ind. list of Goran Jugović 2, Ind. list of Duje Šunjić 1)
Mertojak	3	1	3 (Note: coalition included Smart for Split and Dalmatia)	0	–	–	–	–
Neslanovac	3	1	–	–	–	–	–	3 (Note: Ind. list of Ante Popović)
Plokite	4	–	3	–	–	–	–	–
Pujanke	4	3	–	0	–	–	–	–
Ravne njive	3	–	–	4	–	–	–	–
Sirobuja	2	–	–	–	–	–	–	5 (Note: Ind. list of Ivica Grubišić)
Spinut	1	1	0	0	–	–	–	5 (Note: Ind. list of Luka Kovač Levantin)
Split 3	2	3	1	1	–	–	–	–
Sućidar	3	–	3	0	–	–	–	1 (Note: Ind. list of Martin Plazibat)
Šine	3	–	–	–	–	–	–	4 (Note: Ind. list of Marina Kovačević)
Trstenik	1	1	5	0	–	–	–	–
Varoš	1	–	0	1	–	–	–	5 (Note: Ind. list of Vjeko Santrić 3, Ind. list of Ante Banović 2)
Visoka	6	1	–	0	–	–	–	–
Žnjan	3	3	0	1	–	–	–	–
Donje Sitno	7	–	–	–	–	–	–	–
Gornje Sitno	7	–	–	–	–	–	–	–
Kamen	7	–	–	–	–	–	–	–
Slatine	3	4	–	–	–	–	–	–
Srinjine	7	–	–	–	–	–	–	–
Stobreč	7	–	–	–	–	–	–	–
Žrnovnica	3	3	–	0	–	1	0	–
Totals	108	34	33	15	2	2	0	44
Results: City Election Commission

== See also ==
- 2021 Split local elections
- 2022 Split local elections
