= 2018 Split district elections =

Local elections in Croatia

- 17 June 2018
- Turnout: 11.48%
	First party	Second party	Third party
Leader	Petar Škorić	Goran Kotur	Ante Čikotić
Party	HDZ	SDP	Most
Alliance		SDP-NL
Seats won	122	42	15
Seat change	▲24	▼3	▲15
Popular vote	7,268	3,399	1,239
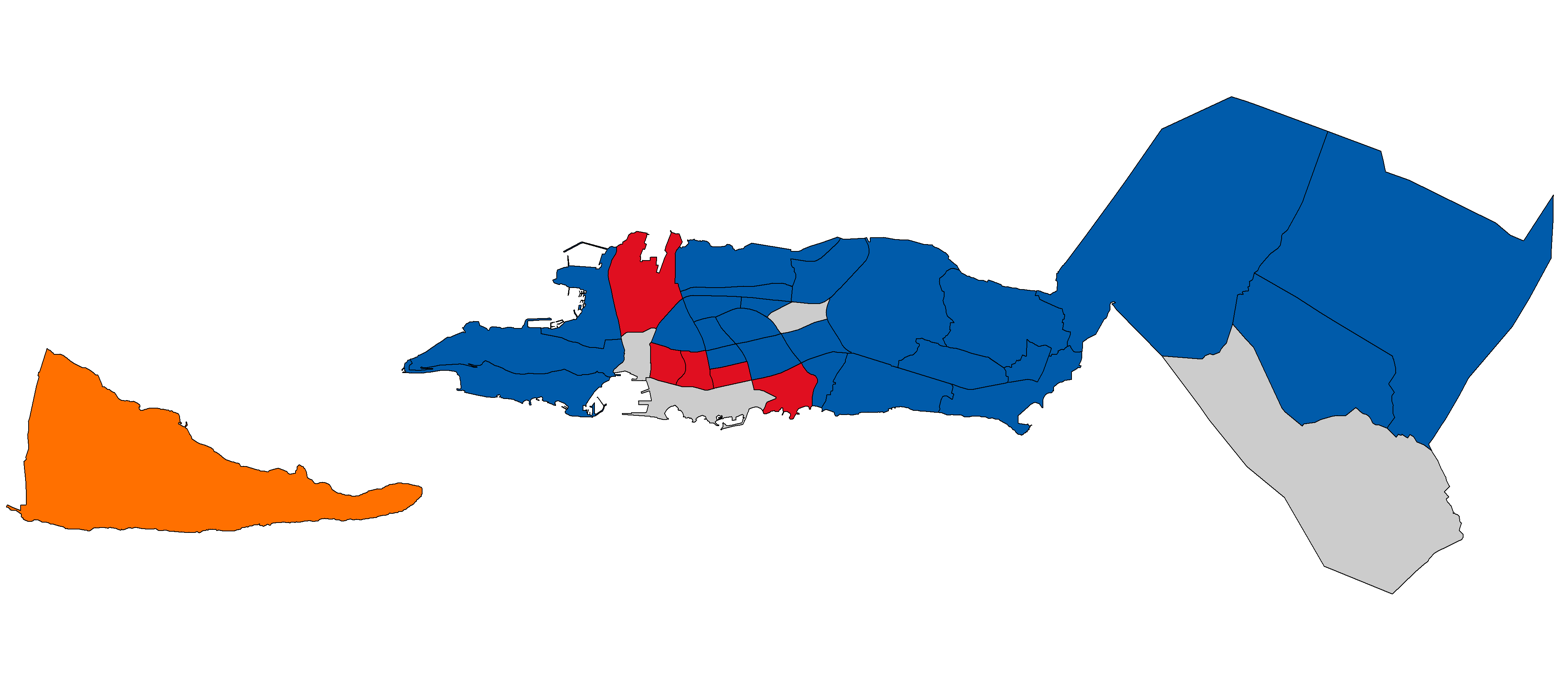

Elections were held in Split, Croatia, on 17 June 2018 for the councils of 34 city districts and local committees of Split. The Croatian Democratic Union won 122 council seats, while the Social Democratic Party of Croatia won 42 seats in coalition with the New Left party.

== Results ==
Distribution of seats per district
District	HDZ	SDP-NL	Most	Pametno	HNS	HSLS	HSP	HSS	HSU	Independent
Bačvice	1	1								5
Blatine-Škrape	2	5								
Bol	3	2		1	1					
Brda	5		2							
Grad	1	2		1						3
Gripe	2	5								
Kman	2	1	1				1			2
Kocunar	2	1	1		1					2
Lokve	3	1		1						2
Lovret	2	2		1						2
Lučac-Manuš	2	3		2						
Mejaši	7									
Meje	4	1							2	
Mertojak	3	2		1						1
Neslanovac	4									3
Plokite	3	2	2							
Pujanke	1	1	1							4
Ravne njive	3	1	1			1				1
Sirobuja	4		3							
Spinut	3	3								1
Split 3	4	2		1						
Sućidar	3	1	1							2
Šine	7									
Trstenik	2	4								1
Varoš	4	2		1						
Visoka	7									
Žnjan	3		1	2			1			
Donje Sitno	7									
Gornje Sitno	7									
Kamen	6									1
Slatine	1		2		1					3
Srinjine	3									4
Stobreč	7									
Žrnovnica	4					1		2		
Totals	122	42	15	11	3	2	2	2	2	37

== See also ==
- 2017 Split local elections
