= 2014 Split district elections =

Local elections in Croatia

- 9 June 2014
- Turnout: 13.52%
	First party	Second party
Leader	Petar Škorić	Ivo Baldasar
Party	HDZ	SDP
Alliance	HDZ-HSLS-HSS- HSP AS-HČSP-BUZ	SDP-HNS-HSU
Seats won	98	45
Popular vote	6,765	3,864
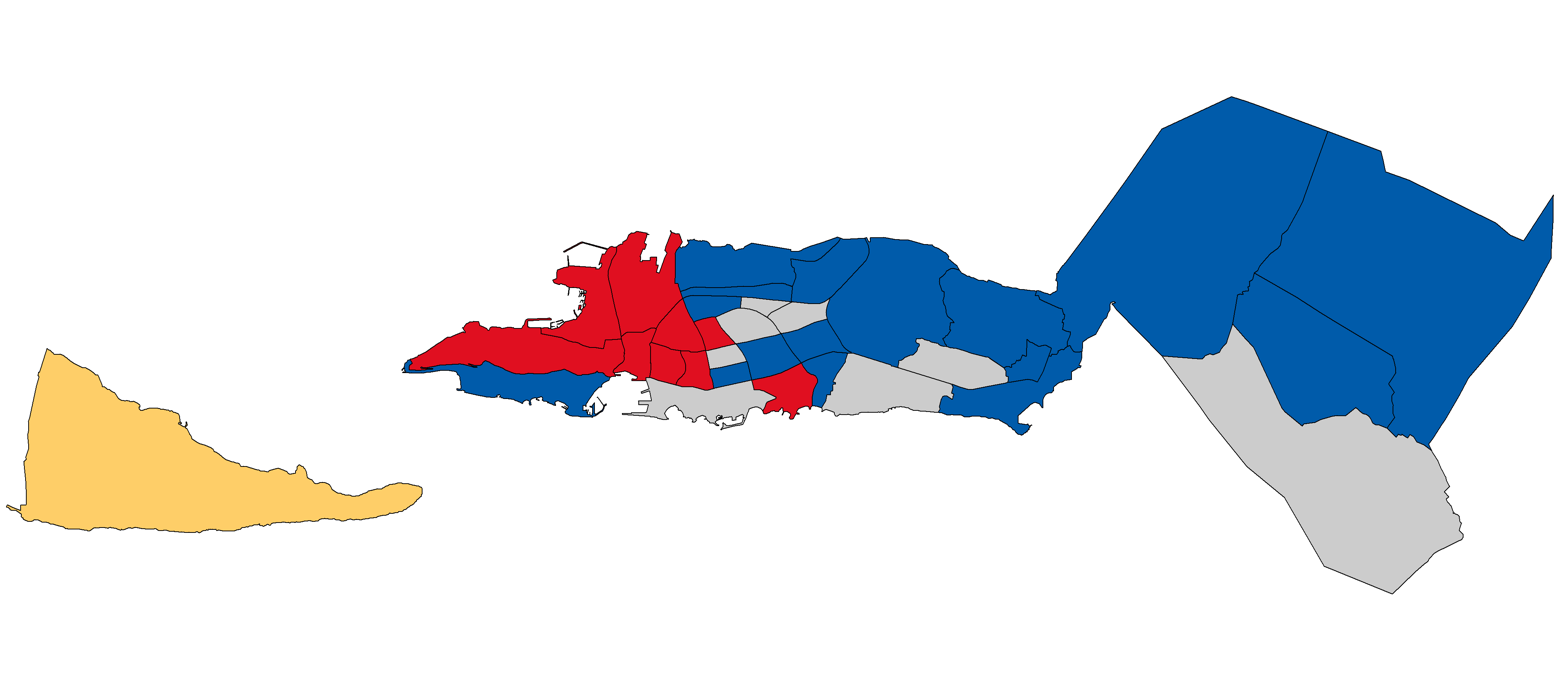
- Results of the election in all Districts of Split: the party with the majority of votes in each district: Croatian Democratic Union; Social Democratic Party of Croatia; Croatian People's Party - Liberal Democrats; Independent

Elections were held in Split, Croatia, on 9 June 2014 for the councils of 34 city districts and local committees of Split. The Croatian Democratic Union coalition won 98 council seats, an absolute majority in 10 districts and a relative majority in 6 districts. The Social Democratic Party of Croatia coalition won 45 seats.

== Results ==
Distribution of seats per district
District	HDZ coalition	SDP coalition	Hrast-HSP	HSS	HNS	HSU	HSP AS	Independent lists
Bačvice	1	1						5
Blatine-Škrape	3	3						1
Bol	2	2		1				2
Brda	5							2
Grad	2	3	1	1				
Gripe	2	4						1
Kman	2	1	2	1				1
Kocunar	2	1	1					3
Lokve	2	2						3
Lovret	2	2						3
Lučac-Manuš	3	3						1
Mejaši	4							3
Meje	3	2						2
Mertojak	3	1						3
Neslanovac	4							3
Plokite	2	3	1					1
Pujanke	2	1						4
Ravne njive	3	2						2
Sirobuja	1						1	5
Spinut	2	3						2
Split 3	4	2						1
Sućidar	2	1						4
Šine	6		1					
Trstenik	2	3						2
Varoš	2	2	1					2
Visoka	4							3
Žnjan	2	1	1					3
Donje Sitno	7							
Gornje Sitno	4			2	1			
Kamen	4							3
Slatine	2				4			1
Srinjine	1					1		5
Stobreč	5							2
Žrnovnica	3	2		1				1
Totals	98	45	8	6	5	1	1	74

== See also ==
- 2013 Split local elections
