= 2021 Croatian local elections =

- 16 and 30 May 2021
Party	HDZ	Independent	SDP
Prefects	13	3	2
Prefects +/-	▲1	▲2	Steady
Party	We Can!	IDS	Mreža
Prefects	1	1	1
Prefects +/-	▲	Steady	Steady
Party	HNS-LD	HSS	BM 365
Prefects	0	0	0
Prefects +/-	▼1	▼1	▼1
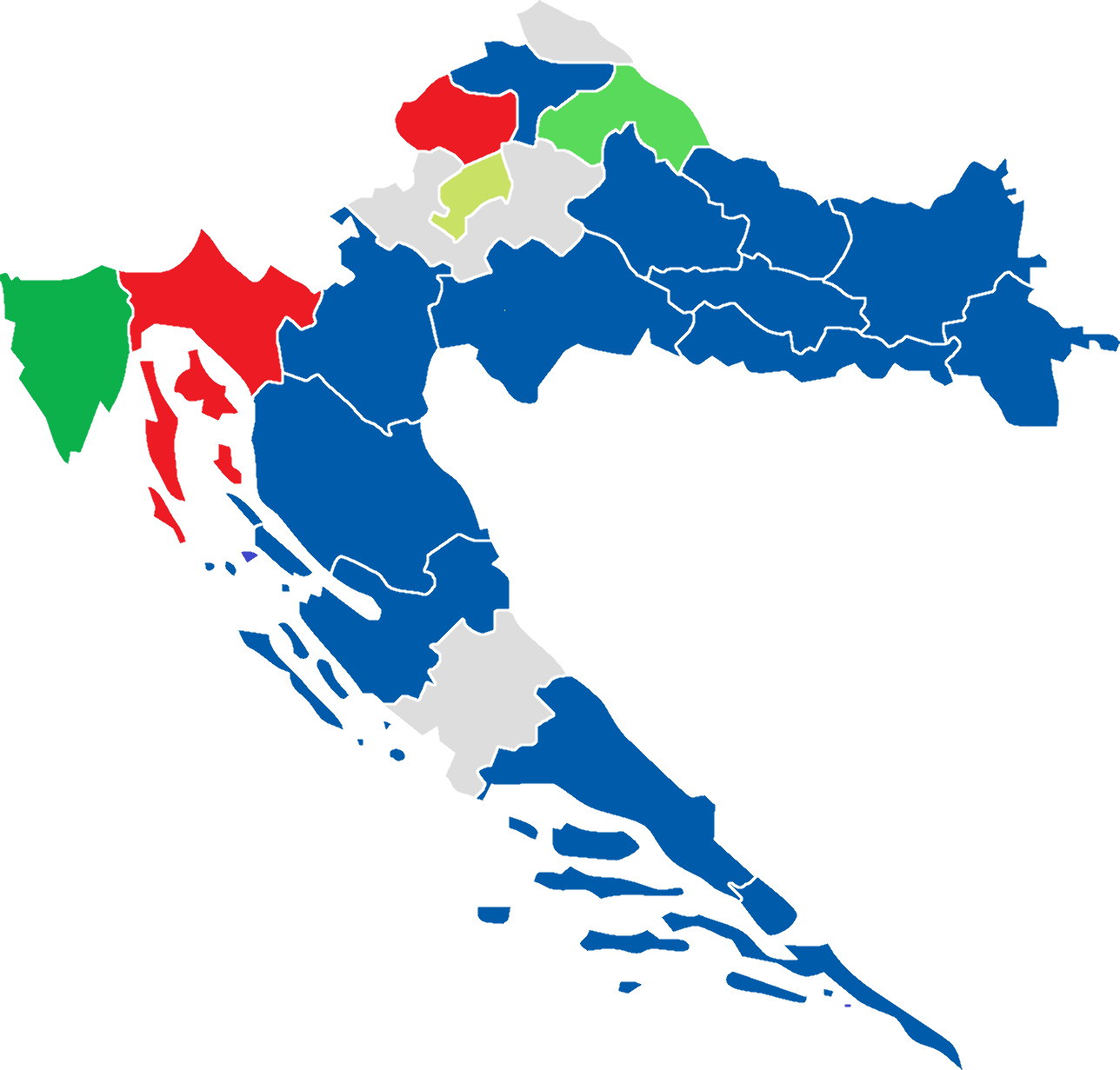
- Elected county prefects in each county of Croatia; HDZ SDP We Can! IDS Mreža Independent

The first round of the 2021 Croatian local elections were held on 16 May and the second round, where necessary, on 30 May. All seats of the county prefects, city and municipal mayors and members of county, municipal and city councils were up for election.

In total, there were 8,216 open seats to be contested by 38,223 candidates. Voters elected 20 county prefects, 128 city mayors, 428 municipal mayors and 7,640 others for positions of deputy county prefects, deputy city mayors, deputy municipal mayors, deputy city and municipal mayors elected by the national minorities, county councilors, city councilors and municipal councilors. About 3,660,000 voters had the right to vote.

Before the elections were even held, the outcome was already settled in five towns including Hrvatska Kostajnica, Nin, Novigrad, Pakrac and Skradin, as well as 66 municipalities, because in all those instances there was only one candidate in the running.

== Election results ==
Results of the election, showing elected municipal and city mayors

=== Counties ===
Results of 2021 Croatian local elections
County	County council		County prefect		
County	Plurality	Turnout	Prefect	Turnout	Notes
Bjelovar-Bilogora	Damir Bajs' List, HSU, SU, BUZ, HNS, NS-R, NSH, GLAS, HSS Radić, HSS (32.51%)	45.91%	Marko Marušić, HDZ (56.52%)	37.11%	runoff election
Brod-Posavina	HDZ, HKS, HSP (42.28%)	44.47%	Danijel Marušić, HDZ (53.39%)	44.53%	first round win
Dubrovnik-Neretva	HDZ, HSLS, HSS, HSU, HS, (40.04%)	57.09%	Nikola Dobroslavić, HDZ (50.42%)	42.21%	runoff election
Istria	IDS, ISU, Zeleni (42.68%)	43.97%	Boris Miletić, IDS (48.14%)	29.52%	runoff election
Karlovac	HDZ, HSLS (42.94%)	47.79%	Martina Furdek-Hajdin, HDZ (60.14%)	33.51%	runoff election
Koprivnica-Križevci	SDP, HSLS, GLAS (23.69%)	47.28%	Darko Koren, Mreža (49.57%)	32.35%	runoff election
Krapina-Zagorje	SDP, HSS, HSU(46.45%)	50.69%	Željko Kolar, SDP (56.50%)	50.78%	first round win
Lika-Senj	HDZ, HSS, HSU, HBS (35.38%)	59.66%	Ernest Petry, HDZ (52.11%)	55.12%	runoff election
Međimurje	Matija Posavec's List, HNS, HSLS, D (58.72%)	44.99%	Matija Posavec, Ind. (64.61%)	45.15%	first round win
Osijek-Baranja	HDZ, Anto Đapić's List, ANU, HSU, HSP, DHSS, BUZ, HSLS (49.60%)	44.18%	Ivan Anušić, HDZ (61.83%)	44.24%	first round win
Požega-Slavonia	HDZ, HSU (52.73%)	43.47%	Antonija Jozić, HDZ (58.12%)	43.58%	first round win
Primorje-Gorski Kotar	SDP, PGS, IDS, HSU, HSS (35.66%)	42.58%	Zlatko Komadina, SDP (55.85%)	33.98%	runoff election
Sisak-Moslavina	HDZ, HSLS, HSS, HSP, HKS, HNS, HSU (45.61%)	47.89%	Ivan Celjak, HDZ (68.75%)	39.44%	runoff election
Split-Dalmatia	HDZ, HSP (32.85%)	47.77%	Blaženko Boban, HDZ (57.14%)	38.33%	runoff election
Šibenik-Knin	HDZ, HSLS (34.97%)	46.96%	Marko Jelić, Ind. (59.76%)	44.14%	runoff election
Varaždin	HDZ, HSLS, HSU (27.81%)	49.28%	Anđelko Stričak, HDZ (48.95%)	39.56%	runoff election
Virovitica-Podravina	HDZ, HSLS (56.69%)	47.07%	Igor Andrović, HDZ (61.59%)	47.14%	first round win
Vukovar-Syrmia	HDZ, DHSS, HSU, BUZ, HSP AS, HNS, HSLS (40.14%)	50.03%	Damir Dekanić, HDZ (54.86%)	35.22%	runoff election
Zadar	HDZ, HSP, SU, NS-R (44.50%)	45.25%	Božidar Longin, HDZ (49.92%)	32.84%	runoff election
Zagreb County	SDP, HSS (25.72%)	44.04%	Stjepan Kožić, Ind. (51.91%)	29.36%	runoff election
City of Zagreb	Možemo!, ZJN, NL, ORaH, ZG (40.83%)	47.09%	Tomislav Tomašević, Možemo! (63.87%)	45.07%	runoff election
Source: State Electoral Committee

The results of the snap elections in Croatian counties
Date	County	Plurality in the council	Turnout	Prefect	Turnout	Note
28 November 2021	Međimurje	Not electing		Matija Posavec, Ind. (79.11%)	28.98%	The prefect resigned; First round win

=== Cities ===
The results of the 2021 elections in Croatian cities
	City Council		Mayor		
City	Plurality	Turnout	Mayor	Turnout	Note
Bakar	HDZ (53.63%)	46.04%	Tomislav Klarić, HDZ (60.43%)	46.05%	First round win
Beli Manastir	HDZ, HSU (59.34%)	39.72%	Tomislav Rob, HDZ (63.77%)	39.72%	First round win
Belišće	Ind. (63.33%)	43.27%	Dinko Burić, Ind. (79.38%)	43.33%	First round win
Benkovac	HDZ (45.26%)	35.23%	Tomislav Bulić, HDZ (57.25%)	30.39%	Runoff election
Biograd na Moru	HDZ, SU, Reformists (48.48%)	50.64%	Ivan Knez, HDZ (51.30%)	50.60%	First round win
Bjelovar	HSLS (42.79%)	39.13%	Dario Hrebak, HSLS (66.86%)	39.51%	First round win
Buje	IDS (55.37%)	41.72%	Fabricio Vižintin, IDS (67.95%)	41.72%	First round win
Buzet	Ind. (35.63%)	58.24%	Damir Kajin, SDP (57.63%)	55.91%	Runoff election
Cres	SDP, PGS, HSS, IDS, HSU (28.17%)	62.44%	Marin Gregorović, SDP (52.51%)	59.54%	Runoff election
Crikvenica	HDZ, HSP, HSS, HSLS (35.90%)	39.35%	Damir Rukavina, HDZ (50.91%)	39.56%	Runoff election
Čabar	SDP (27.16%)	55.70%	Antonio Dražović, ŽZ (59.61%)	58.53%	Runoff election
Čakovec	Matija Posavec's list, HNS, HSLS, D, HDSS (38.63%)	46.12%	Ljerka Cividini, HNS (56.97%)	41.49%	Runoff election
Čazma	Ind. (36.73%)	44.04%	Dinko Pirak, Ind. (54.73)	44.01%	First round win
Daruvar	HDZ, HSU, HDS (45.37%)	49.15%	Damir Lneniček, HDZ (63.63%)	49.17%	First round win
Delnice	Ind. (33.12%)	45.12%	Katarina Mihelčić, Ind. (55.63%)	41.42%	Runoff election
Donja Stubica	Ind. (47.92%)	46.82%	Nikola Gospočić, Ind. (83.01%)	46.82%	First round win
Donji Miholjac	Ind. (37.67%)	40.80%	Goran Aladić, Ind. (51.45%)	43.63%	Runoff election
Drniš	HDZ (47.45%)	49.61%	Josip Begonja, HDZ (51.62%)	49.67%	First round win
Dubrovnik	HDZ, HS, HSU (28.81%)	51.42%	Mato Franković, HDZ (56.09%)	42.50%	Runoff election
Duga Resa	HSS (49.76%)	49.31%	Tomislav Boljar, HSS (66.18%)	49.30%	First round win
Dugo Selo	HDZ, Stjepan Kožić's List, BM365, HSU, HDS, HSS Braće Radić (28.07%)	35.54%	Nenad Panian, Ind. (56.61%)	35.11%	Runoff election
Đakovo	HDZ (38.45%)	41.65%	Marin Mandarić, HDZ (61.40%)	37.25%	Runoff election
Đurđevac	Ind. (68.64%)	53.48%	Hrvoje Janči, Ind. (67.74%)	53.54%	First round win
Garešnica	HDZ, HSLS, HSP (53.77%)	47.15%	Josip Bilandžija, HDZ (68.53%)	47.39%	First round win
Glina	Ind. (29.75%)	54.96%	Ivan Janković, Ind. (52.38%)	49.38%	Runoff election
Gospić	HSP (42.97%)	59.54%	Karlo Starčević, HSP (66.45%)	62.86%	Runoff election
Grubišno Polje	HDZ (52.92%)	53.96%	Zlatko Mađeruh, HDZ (56.88%)	54.35%	First round win
Hrvatska Kostajnica	HDZ (75.78%)	44.88%	Dalibor Bišćan, HDZ (92.42%)	45.25%	Single-candidate election
Hvar	Ind. (26.02%)	47.44%	Rikardo Novak, Ind. (70.60%)	49.92%	Runoff election
Ilok	Ind. (34.38%)	51.06%	Marina Budimir, Ind. (52.58%)	49.44%	Runoff election
Imotski	HDZ, HSS (48.49%)	50.24%	Ivan Budalić, HDZ (56.75%)	51.01%	Runoff election
Ivanec	Ind. (38.31%)	46.01%	Milorad Batinić, Ind. (57.56%)	40.66%	Runoff election
Ivanić-Grad	HDZ, HSLS, Reformists, HNS, HSU (49.25%)	37.92%	Javor Bojan Leš, HDZ (69.29%)	38.00%	First round win
Jastrebarsko	SDP, HSU (46.58%)	50.51%	Zvonimir Novosel, SDP (51.92%)	50.67%	First round win
Karlovac	HDZ, HSLS (39.35%)	42.24%	Damir Mandić, HDZ (53.88%)	41.55%	Runoff election
Kastav	SDP, PGS (46.72%)	40.10%	Matej Mostarac, SDP (53.60%)	40.12%	First round win
Kaštela	HDZ (45.54%)	32.64%	Denis Ivanović, HDZ (57.14%)	32.66%	First round win
Klanjec	SDP (51.19%)	50.29%	Zlatko Brlek, SDP (57.53%)	49.27%	Runoff election
Knin	HDZ (37.18%)	44.78%	Marijo Ćaćić, Ind. (60.64%)	46.59%	Runoff election
Komiža	SDP, HNS (45.61%)	48.13%	Tonka Ivčević, SDP (50.85%)	48.13%	First round win
Koprivnica	SDP, HSS, HSU, HSLS, GLAS (53.59%)	38.85%	Mišel Jakšić, SDP (59.17%)	38.84%	First round win
Korčula	HDZ, HSS, HSP, HSLS (41.84%)	60.89%	Nika Silić Maroević, SDP (48.83%)	60.98%	First round win
Kraljevica	HDZ (50.86%)	48.54%	Dalibor Čundrlić, HDZ (64.22%)	45.84%	First round win
Krapina	HDZ, ZDS, DHSS, A-HSS, SU (54.48%)	53.68%	Zoran Gregurović, HDZ (59.56%)	53.76%	First round win
Križevci	Ind. (38.17%)	44.70%	Mario Rajn, Ind. (71.53%)	40.32%	Runoff election
Krk	PGS, SDP (42.45%)	37.29%	Darijo Vasilić, PGS (74.74%)	37.29%	First round win
Kutina	HDZ, HSLS, HSU, HNS (49.10%)	44.04%	Zlatko Babić, HDZ (56.60%)	44.06%	First round win
Kutjevo	HDZ (61.61%)	45.57%	Josip Budimir, HDZ (73.53%)	45.71%	First round win
Labin	IDS, ISU (49.25%)	39.79%	Valter Glavičić, IDS (62.61%)	39.84%	First round win
Lepoglava	HDZ, HSU (26.06%)	51.79%	Marijan Škvarić, HNS (53.06%)	45.12%	Runoff election
Lipik	HDZ (52.56%)	46.35%	Vinko Kasana, HDZ (68.47%)	46.35%	First round win
Ludbreg	Ind. (44.63%)	46.04%	Dubravko Bilić, Ind. (55.81%)	46.06%	First round win
Makarska	SDP (38.17%)	44.04%	Zoran Paunović, SDP (59.85%)	43.69%	Runoff election
Mali Lošinj	HDZ, HDS, SU, HSS (25.70%)	54.25%	Ana Kučić, HDZ (61.44%)	47.25%	Runoff election
Metković	HDZ, HSLS, HSU (53.14%)	56.18%	Dalibor Milan, HDZ (62.77%)	56.04%	First round win
Mursko Središće	HDZ, HDS, HSLS, HNS (53.78%)	38.20%	Dražen Srpak, HDZ (71.45%)	38.25%	First round win
Našice	HDZ (50.73%)	45.91%	Krešimir Kašuba, HDZ (51.08%)	46.03%	First round win
Nin	HDZ, Reformists (71.55%)	37.95%	Emil Ćurko, HDZ (76.59%)	37.95%	Single-candidate election
Nova Gradiška	Ind. (50.16%)	45.09%	Vinko Grgić, Ind. (61.66%)	45.30%	First round win
Novalja	HDZ (40.65%)	68.93%	Ivan Dabo, HDZ (51.79%)	76.46%	Runoff election
Novi Marof	HDZ, HSS Braće Radić, HNS, HSU (61.73%)	45.19%	Siniša Jenkač, HDZ (66.87%)	45.41%	First round win
Novi Vinodolski	HDZ, HSS (67.01%)	51.14%	Tomislav Cvitković, HDZ (65.81%)	51.14%	First round win
Novigrad	IDS (65.58%)	31.57%	Anteo Milos, IDS (85.41%)	31.57%	Single-candidate election
Novska	HDZ, HSS (61.54%)	43.62%	Marin Piletić, HDZ (63.72%)	43.61%	First round win
Obrovac	HDZ (42.18%)	42.20%	Ante Župan, HDZ (56.88%)	42.20%	First round win
Ogulin	SDP (46.03%)	59.47%	Dalibor Domitrović, SDP (58.31%)	59.49%	First round win
Omiš	Ind. (39.20%)	49.57%	Vinko Grgić, Ind. (59.15%)	49.70%	First round win
Opatija	Ind. (28.56%)	47.65%	Fernando Kirigin, SDP (50.12%)	48.14%	Runoff election
Opuzen	HDZ, HSLS (48.09%)	59.63%	Ivan Mataga, Ind. (49.44%)	68.02%	Runoff election
Orahovica	HDZ (35.89%)	57.78%	Saša Rister, HDZ (60.64%)	46.67%	Runoff election
Oroslavje	Ind. (30.18%)	51.26%	Viktor Šimunić, Ind. (53.63%)	51.31%	Runoff election
Osijek	HDZ, Anto Đapić's List, ANU, HSU, BUZ, HSLS, DHSS (38.83%)	39.42%	Ivan Radić, HDZ (59.66%)	29.13%	Runoff election
Otočac	LiPO (36.25%)	59.18%	Goran Bukovac, Ind. (53.64%)	61.73%	Runoff election
Otok	HDZ, HKS, HSS (58.48%)	59.66%	Josip Šarić, HDZ (61.62%)	59.68%	First round win
Ozalj	HDZ (32.35%)	51.15%	Lidija Bošnjak, Ind. (51.14%)	48.91%	Runoff election
Pag	HDZ, MODES, Reformists (61.90%)	66.23%	Ante Fabijanić, HDZ (63.11%)	66.31%	First round win
Pakrac	HDZ (68.12%)	30.80%	Anamarija Blažević, HDZ (83.16%)	31.03%	Single-candidate election
Pazin	IDS, HSU, HNS (39.85%)	48.07%	Suzana Jašić, Možemo! (51.04%)	48.84%	Runoff election
Petrinja	HDZ (30.65%)	48.04%	Magdalena Komes, HDZ (57.98%)	49.60%	Runoff election
Pleternica	HDZ (60.99%)	51.49%	Marija Šarić, HDZ (62.14%)	51.56%	First round win
Ploče	SDP, PS (53.46%)	68.31%	Mišo Krstičević, SDP (60.62%)	68.31%	First round win
Popovača	HDZ, HSU (39.10%)	55.57%	Josip Mišković, HSP (51.69%)	60.37%	Runoff election
Poreč	IDS (57.21%)	41.20%	Loris Peršurić, IDS (74.58%)	41.20%	First round win
Požega	HDZ, HSU (42.08%)	43.05%	Željko Glavić, HDZ (50.13%)	43.21%	First round win
Pregrada	SDP, ZS (67.44%)	44.39%	Marko Vešligaj, SDP (74.06%)	44.39%	First round win
Prelog	HDZ, HSS (52.34%)	48.77%	Ljubomir Kolarek, HDZ (64.10%)	49.13%	First round win
Pula	IDS, ISU, ZS (32.10%)	38.67%	Filip Zoričić, Ind. (55.05%)	39.33%	Runoff election
Rab	HDZ, HSS, RPS (42.47%)	52.17%	Nikola Grgurić, HDZ (51.63%)	52.21%	First round win
Rijeka	SDP, HSU, IDS, HSS (28.05%)	37.57%	Marko Filipović, SDP (52.60%)	34.16%	Runoff election
Rovinj	IDS (58.64%)	34.48%	Marko Paliaga, IDS (64.07%)	34.63%	First round win
Samobor	HSS, SDP (41.24%)	47.46%	Petra Škrobot, FOKUS (54.35%)	47.84%	Runoff election
Senj	HDZ, HBS, HSS (55.24%)	60.00%	Jurica Tomljanović, HDZ (58.90%)	60.00%	First round win
Sinj	Most (41.07%)	53.13%	Miro Bulj, Most (57.09%)	50.06%	Runoff election
Sisak	HDZ, HSLS, HKS, HSP, SDA, HSS, HSU HNS (33.90%)	46.89%	Kristina Ikić Baniček, SDP (51.37%)	48.01%	Runoff election
Skradin	HDZ (58.51%)	34.81%	Antonijo Brajković, HDZ (83.39%)	34.66%	Single-candidate election
Slatina	HDZ, HSLS (42.50%)	43.05%	Denis Ostrošić, DP (50.50%)	41.60%	Runoff election
Slavonski Brod	Ind. (37.06%)	39.28%	Mirko Duspara, Ind. (51.21%)	39.00%	Runoff election
Slunj	HDZ (57.07%)	43.44%	Mirjana Puškarić, HDZ (67.77%)	43.60%	First round win
Solin	HDZ, HSU (38.09%)	43.34%	Dalibor Ninčević, HDZ (49.97%)	47.06%	Runoff election
Split	HDZ (23.27%)	43.95%	Ivica Puljak, Centar (55.06%)	43.53%	Runoff election
Stari Grad	Ind. (54.37%)	54.91%	Antonio Škarpa, Ind. (66.07%)	54.91%	First round win
Supetar	SDP, HSU (47.35%)	54.22%	Ivana Marković, SDP (60.51%)	54.22%	First round win
Sveta Nedelja	FOKUS (60.80%)	47.19%	Dario Zurovec, FOKUS (64.48%)	47.19%	First round win
Sveti Ivan Zelina	FOKUS (33.70%)	42.32%	Hrvoje Košćec, FOKUS (59.22%)	38.47%	Runoff election
Šibenik	HDZ, HSLS (42.02%)	41.47%	Željko Burić, HDZ (60.89%)	44.19%	Runoff election
Trilj	HDZ (38.79%)	60.30%	Ivan Bugarin, HDZ (49.83%)	63.91%	Runoff election
Trogir	SDP, HNS, HSU, HL (50.77%)	52.90%	Ante Bilić, SDP (63.65%)	52.90%	First round win
Umag	SDP, HNS, HSU (45.99%)	34.53%	Vili Bassanese, SDP (65.53%)	34.71%	First round win
Valpovo	Ind. (50.77%)	52.14%	Matko Šutalo, Ind. (60.78%)	52.43%	First round win
Varaždin	Ind. (22.36%)	44.18%	Neven Bosilj, SDP (48.71%)	42.91%	Runoff election
Varaždinske Toplice	HDZ, HSLS (37.71%)	59.01%	Dragica Ratković, HDZ (54.46%)	61.96%	Runoff election
Velika Gorica	HDZ, BM365, Stjepan Kožić's List, HSU, HSLS (43.43%)	41.67%	Krešimir Ačkar, HDZ (50.10%)	41.69%	First round win
Vinkovci	HDZ, HSU, HSP (48.96%)	44.74%	Ivan Bosančić, HDZ (58.97%)	44.78%	First round win
Virovitica	HDZ, HSLS (49.58%)	46.18%	Ivica Kirin, HDZ (51.53%)	46.17%	First round win
Vis	HDZ (41.86%)	54.52%	Ivo Radica, HDZ (60.02%)	54.52%	First round win
Vodice	HDZ, HSS (44.32%)	44.53%	Ante Cukrov, HDZ (50.62%)	48.02%	Runoff election
Vodnjan	Ind. (54.33%)	55.31%	Edi Pastrovicchio, Ind. (58.19%)	55.32%	First round win
Vrbovec	SDP, HSS, HL (57.88%)	52.04%	Denis Kralj, SDP (69.43%)	52.34%	First round win
Vrbovsko	Ind. (24.59%)	48.92%	Dražen Mufić, Ind. (55.71%)	48.56%	Runoff election
Vrgorac	NLM (50.23%)	67.82%	Mile Erceg, NLM (56.44%)	67.86%	First round win
Vrlika	HDZ (67.92%)	50.83%	Jure Plazonić, HDZ (64.18%)	48.07%	First round win
Vukovar	Ind., HKS (41.78%)	48.23%	Ivan Penava, Ind. (53.26%)	43.80%	Runoff election
Zabok	SDP, HSU, HSS, HSS Braće Radić (33.31%)	52.25%	Ivan Hanžek, SDP (49.89%)	46.08%	Runoff election
Zadar	HDZ, HSP, SU, Reformists (34.61%)	39.19%	Branko Dukić, HDZ (52.41%)	38.95%	Runoff election
Zaprešić	HDZ, HSU (29.77%)	42.52%	Željko Turk, HDZ (49.71%)	43.12%	Runoff election
Zlatar	SDP, HSU (57.27%)	47.88%	Jasenka Auguštan-Pentek, SDP (61.12%)	48.02%	First round win
Županja	Ind. (37.30%)	49.86%	Damir Juzbašić, Ind. (60.59%)	48.29%	Runoff election
Source: State Electoral Committee

Mayors by political party
Party	2017	2021	Change
HDZ	63	56	▼7
Independent	21	28	▲7
SDP	19	22	▲3
IDS	9	5	▼4
Focus	new!	3	▲3
HSP	1	2	▲1
Možemo!	0	2	▲2
HNS-LD	5	2	▼3
HSS	4	1	▼3
HSLS	1	1	0
PGS	1	1	0
NLM	1	1	0
ŽZ	0	1	▲1
Most	0	1	▲1
Centar	0	1	▲1
DP	new!	1	▲1
MODES	1	0	▼1
Reformists	1	0	▼1

The results of the snap elections in Croatian cities
Date	City	Plurality in the council	Turnout	Mayor	Turnout	Note
3 October 2021	Pazin	Možemo! (48.86%)	37.98%	Not electing		The town council has not been constituted in three attempts
12 June 2022	Novska	Not electing		Marija Kušmiš, HDZ (82.00%)	25.38%	The mayor resigned; First round win
26 June 2022; 10 July 2022	Split	Centar (42.47%)	31.60%	Ivica Puljak, Centar (66.16%)	28.35%	The mayor and the council resigned; Second round win
16 April 2023	Čabar	Ind. (48.23%)	49.66%	Not electing		Failure to vote on the budget
16 April 2023	Varaždin	SDP (43.34%)	31.19%	Not electing		Failure to vote on the budget
29 October 2023	Orahovica	HDZ (31.08%)	42.92%	Not electing		Council sessions were not held within period of three months
9 June 2024	Rab	HDZ, RPS, HSS (45.26%)	43.52%	Not electing		Failure to vote on the budget
9 June 2024; 23 June 2024	Gospić	Not electing		Darko Milinović, LiPO (53.19%)	55.37%	The mayor resigned; Second round win
1 December 2024; 15 December 2024	Otok	Not electing		Slavko Grgić, DP (53.11%)	53.64%	The mayor resigned; Second round win

== Elections in major cities ==
- 2021 Zagreb local elections
- 2021 Split local elections
- 2021 Rijeka local elections
- 2021 Osijek local elections
- 2022 Split local elections
