= Sitno =

Sitno may refer to the following places:

- Sitno, Lower Silesian Voivodeship (south-west Poland)
- Sitno, Bydgoszcz County in Kuyavian-Pomeranian Voivodeship (north-central Poland)
- Sitno, Golub-Dobrzyń County in Kuyavian-Pomeranian Voivodeship (north-central Poland)
- Sitno, Sępólno County in Kuyavian-Pomeranian Voivodeship (north-central Poland)
- Sitno, Wąbrzeźno County in Kuyavian-Pomeranian Voivodeship (north-central Poland)
- Sitno, Gmina Międzyrzec Podlaski, Biała County in Lublin Voivodeship (east Poland)
- Sitno, Radzyń County in Lublin Voivodeship (east Poland)
- Sitno, Zamość County in Lublin Voivodeship (east Poland)
- Sitno, Masovian Voivodeship (east-central Poland)
- Sitno, Pomeranian Voivodeship (north Poland)
- Sitno, Warmian-Masurian Voivodeship (north Poland)
- Sitno, Gryfino County in West Pomeranian Voivodeship (north-west Poland)
- Sitno, Gmina Myślibórz in West Pomeranian Voivodeship (north-west Poland)
- Sitno, Gmina Barlinek in West Pomeranian Voivodeship (north-west Poland)
- Sitno, Szczecinek County in West Pomeranian Voivodeship (north-west Poland)
- Sitno Castle, near Banská Štiavnica, Slovakia
- Sitno (peak), a hill near Banská Štiavnica, Slovakia
- Sitno, Croatia, a village near Prgomet
- Sitno Donje, a village near Šibenik, Croatia
- Donje Sitno, a village near Split, Croatia
- Gornje Sitno, a village near Split, Croatia
