= Tomislav Šuta =

Croatian politician

Mayor of Split
- Incumbent
- Assumed office 9 June 2025
- Preceded by: Ivica Puljak

Member of the Croatian Parliament
- Incumbent
- Assumed office 16 May 2024
- Prime Minister: Andrej Plenković
- Constituency: 10th electoral district

Personal details
- Born: 7 September 1982 (age 44) Split, SR Croatia, SFR Yugoslavia
- Party: Croatian Democratic Union
- Spouse: Matilda Šuta (m. 2008)
- Children: 3
- Education: University of Split
- Website: tomislavsuta.hr

Tomislav Šuta (born 7 September 1982) is a Croatian politician and economist serving as the 74th mayor of Split since 2025 and as a representative in the Croatian Parliament since 2024.

== Biography ==
Šuta was born in Split in 1982 where he graduated from Marko Marulić High School in 2001. He graduated from the Faculty of Economics in Split, majoring in Finance. In 2010, he passed the forensic accounting course (RRIF) organized by the Ministry of Finance.

He first worked in the Ministry of Finance at the tax administration in Split until 2014 when he became the director of the Regional Center for Clean Environment in Lećevica. In 2018, he became the director of the Split Waterworks and Sewerage. He held this position until 2023 when he was replaced.

== Political career ==
Šuta has been a member of HDZ since 2001. In 2022 he was elected the president of HDZ Split, beating the other candidate, Andrija Čaljkušić, by a vote of 972-700.

In the 2022 Split local elections he was elected to the City Council of Split but did not become a councilor due to provisions of the new Act on the Prevention of Conflict of Interest. After he was replaced as director of Split Waterworks and Sewerage, he was allowed to become a councilor.

In the 2024 Croatian parliamentary election he was elected to the Croatian Parliament from the 10th constituency. HDZ won 34.42% of the vote, gaining 61 seats, and would go on to form a government with the Homeland Movement. While in parliament, he served as a member of the Finance and Central Budget Committee, Environment and Nature Conservation Committee and Committee on Maritime Affairs, Transportation and Infrastructure.

=== Mayor of Split ===
In the 2025 Split local elections Šuta ran as a candidate for mayor of Split and won 30.54% of the vote, advancing into the second round against incumbent mayor Ivica Puljak. He won the second round with 53.19% of the vote, defeating Puljak who announced he was retiring from politics. Šuta officially became mayor on 9 June 2025.

While Šuta won the mayoral election, HDZ won only 10 seats out of 31 on the Split City Council. HDZ formed a coalition with the Croatian Civic Party (HGS) which had 4 seats and councilor Marijo Popović (HSP) but still needed 1 vote for the majority. While the first attempt to constitute a city council was unsuccessful, the second vote was successful and Igor Stanišić from the Croatian Civic Party was elected president of the city council on 18 July 2025. The vote was held in secret so it is unknown who the 16th vote for Stanišić was.

Šuta was present at the ceremonial opening of the new Žnjan plateau and called it "a great day for Split and its citizens." On 24 June 2025 he dismissed Ivica Karoglan, the director of Split's utility contractor Čistoća, and replaced him with Andrija Čaljkušić. He also canceled the tender for the reconstruction of the Poljud stadium after a storm damaged the roof and said the people of Split would vote in a referendum on what kind of reconstruction they want.

On 28 July 2025 Šuta announced a series of new measures to support families which included: free kindergartens for all children residing in Split, free textbooks for high school students residing in Split and the introduction of free public transport tickets for pupils and students.

On July 29, 2025, a protest was held in Split after it was revealed that the MS Moby Drea would be entering the Split shipyard to remove asbestos panels. Brodosplit announced that the removal would take around 2 months. City councilor Igor Skoko, from the party Centre, accused Šuta of knowing about the boat because he held a meeting with representatives of Brodosplit. Šuta later said that "a shipyard like this has no place in Split". He also said: "the space that Brodosplit occupies today must be reduced and repurposed for new modern technologies that have a future". After consultations with experts, the Croatian Ministry of Environmental Protection and Green Transition said that the waste that would be generated on board by removing partitions containing asbestos cannot be disposed of in Croatia.

== Personal life ==
He has been married to Matilda Šuta since 2008. She also graduated from the Faculty of Economics in Split and was employed in the city Finance Department for 16 years. The couple has 3 children.

== See also ==
- List of mayors of Split
- List of members of the Sabor, 2024–
