= Zvonimir Mihanović =

Croatian artist (1946 – )

- Born: August 12, 1946; Donje Sitno, PR Croatia, FPR Yugoslavia
- Known for: Hyperrealistic oil paintings of the Dalmatian coast
- Movement: Hyperrealist
- Children: 2

Zvonimir Mihanović (born 1946) is a Croatian artist.

== Early life ==
Zvonimir Mihanović was born in Donje Sitno on August 12, 1946 (today part of the Split-Dalmatia County). Sitno was originally part of the Republic of Poljica and the Mihanović family roots can be traced in Sitno to the 17th century.

== Education ==
After graduating high school in Split, Mihanović entered the Academy of Fine Arts in Zagreb, and then at the Accademia di Brera in Milan. In 1971, Mihanović entered the Ecole Beaux Arts in Paris, graduating in 1976.

== Croatian War of Independence ==
In 1991, the then president of Croatia enlisted Mihanović for the “Art-Garde” a group of artists writers etc who helped protect Croatian artistic treasures from looting and damage during the Croatian War of Independence, and he made contributions to this effort.

Mihanović was awarded the Order of Danica Hrvatska in 1996.

== Museum Collections ==
- Hunter Museum of American Art, Chattanooga, TN

== Exhibitions ==
- 1962: Salon of Young Artists; Split, Croatia
- 1966: Croatian Pavilion, Summer Olympics; Atlanta, GA
- 1973: Salon des Artistes Français; Société des Artistes Français; Paris, France
- 1978: Salon d'Automne; Paris, France (awarded Grande Prix and best young exhibitor). Painting no. 1341, Silence.
- 1980: Findlay Galleries; New York, NY (1st solo exhibition in the United States)
- 1981: Museum of Modern Art, Dubrovnik, Croatia
- 1986: Findlay Galleries; New York, NY
- 1989: Findlay Galleries; New York, NY
- 1991: Museum of Modern Art, Dubrovnik, Croatia
- 1996: Parrish Art Museum; Southampton, NY
- 2012: Forbes Galleries; New York, NY
- 2021: Findlay Galleries; New York, NY
