= Marijana Puljak =

Croatian politician and computer scientist

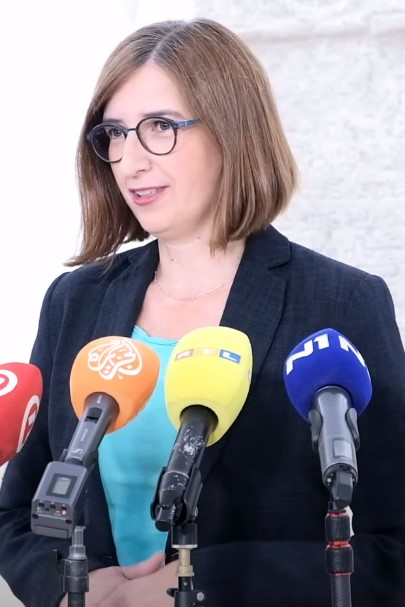
- Marijana Puljak in 2023

Member of Parliament
- Incumbent
- Assumed office 22 July 2020
- Constituency: Electoral district X

Co-leader of Centre
- In office 15 November 2020 – 6 November 2021 Serving with Dalija Orešković, Marin Račić, Dario Carev
- Preceded by: Position established
- Succeeded by: Ivica Puljak

President of Pametno
- In office June 2015 – 15 November 2020
- Preceded by: Position established
- Succeeded by: Position abolished

Member of Split City Council
- In office 19 May 2013 – 16 May 2021

Personal details
- Born: Marijana Rakuljić; 19 August 1971 (age 55) Split, SR Croatia, SFR Yugoslavia
- Party: Centre (2013–present)
- Spouse: Ivica Puljak (m. 1995)
- Children: 3
- Education: University of Split
- Website: marijana.org

Marijana Puljak (née Rakuljić; born 19 August 1971) is a Croatian politician and computer scientist who is serving as a Member of Parliament since 2020.

She graduated in computer science from the Faculty of Electrical Engineering, Mechanical Engineering and Naval Architecture of the University of Split in 1994. After graduation, she worked in a firm "SWING Informatics". Since 2005, she worked in Splitska banka and later held the position of a department director.

Puljak is the founder of the liberal party Pametno, formed in Split out of the citizens' initiative Za pametne ljude i pametan grad ("For smart people and a smart city"). The initiative was born out of the activist fight for a new school, missing in the district of Žnjan. In 2010, Puljak served as President of the Split City District of Žnjan which had around 6000 citizens. She was a candidate for Mayor of Split in 2013 and 2017.

She served as president of Pametno from its foundation in 2013. After Pametno merged with Party with a First and Last Name (IP) and became the Centre, Puljak became one of the four co-leaders of the new party, together with Dalija Orešković, Marin Račić and Dario Carev. Orešković and Puljak were elected to the Croatian Parliament in the 2020 Croatian parliamentary election, as leading candidates of the Pametno - IP - Focus coalition.

She is married to Ivica Puljak, a physicist who served as mayor of Split from 2021 to 2025 and was president of Centre. They have two daughters and a son together.
