= 2021 Osijek local elections =

Local elections in Croatia

- 16 May 2021 (first round); 30 May 2021 (second round)
- Turnout: 39.48% (first round); 29.13% (runoff)
Candidate	Ivan Radić	Berislav Mlinarević
Party	HDZ	Independent
Popular vote	15,526	9,241
Percentage	62.69%	37.31%
Mayor before election
Ivan Vrkić
Ind.
Elected mayor
Ivan Radić
HDZ

Elections were held in Osijek, Croatia, on 16 and 30 May 2021 for the 49th Mayor of Osijek, the two deputy mayors and the 31 members of the Osijek City Council, as part of the 2021 Croatian local elections. The incumbent mayor, Ivan Vrkić, announced on 11 July 2020 that he will not run for another term.

This was the third direct election for the mayor of Osijek (simultaneously held with elections for all other county prefects and mayors in Croatia) since the popular vote method was introduced in 2009, as previously those officials had been elected by their county or city assemblies and councils.

== Mayoral election ==
Candidates		First round		Runoff	
Candidate	Party	Votes	%	Votes	%
Ivan Radić	Croatian Democratic Union	13,655	38.69	15,526	59.66
Berislav Mlinarević	Homeland Movement	6,930	19.63	9,241	35,51
Goran Kušec	Social Democratic Party	6,359	18.01		
Vladimir Šišljagić	Power of Slavonia and Baranja	2,884	8.17		
Vladimir Ham	Croatian People's Party – Liberal Democrats	1,976	5.59		
Katarina Kruhonja	We can!	1,476	4.18		
Miroslav Vanek	Independent	1,085	3.07		
Total votes:		34,365	97.40	24,767	95.20
Invalid votes:		916	2.60	1,248	4,80
Turnout:		35,281	39.48	26,026	29.13
Expected voters:		89,385		89,333	
The percentages of votes from each candidate are calculated from number of valid voters. The percentages of valid and invalid votes are calculated from the turnout number. The turnout percentage is calculated from the number of expected voters.
Source: State Election Commission

== Council election ==
Party list	Previous seats	Votes	%	Seats	%	Seat change
Croatian Democratic Union; Independent list of Anto Đapić; Active Independent Pensioners; Croatian Party of Pensioners; Bloc Pensioner Together; Croatian Social Liberal Party; Democratic HSS	12 / 37	13,252	38.83	14 / 31	45.16	▲2
Homeland Movement; The Bridge	5 / 37	6,107	17.89	6 / 31	19.35	▲1
Social Democratic Party	10 / 37	5,914	17.33	6 / 31	19.35	▼4
We can!	0 / 37	2,520	7.38	2 / 31	6.45	▲2
Power of Slavonia and Baranja	0 / 37	2,339	6.85	2 / 31	6.45	▲2
Croatian People's Party – Liberal Democrats; Croatian Peasant Party; People's Party – Reformists	0 / 37	1,856	5.43	1 / 31	3.23	▲1
Independent list of Miroslav Vanek	0 / 37	1,556	4.56	0 / 37	0.00	0
Croatian Democratic Alliance of Slavonia and Baranja	3 / 37	577	1.69	0 / 37	0.00	▼3
Total:		34,121	96.88	31		▼6
Invalid votes:		1,099	3.12			
Turnout:		35,239	39.42			
Expected voters:		89,385				
The percentages of votes from each list are calculated from number of valid voters The percentages of valid and invalid votes are calculated from the turnout number The turnout percentage is calculated from the number of expected voters
Source:State Election Commission

== See also ==
- 2021 Croatian local elections
- 2021 Zagreb local elections
- 2021 Split local elections
- 2021 Rijeka local elections
- List of mayors in Croatia
- List of mayors of Osijek
