= 2022 Split local elections =

Local government elections in Croatia

- 26 June 2022 (first round); 10 July 2022 (second round)
- Turnout: 31.57% (first round) ▼12.39% 28.35% (runoff) ▼15.18%
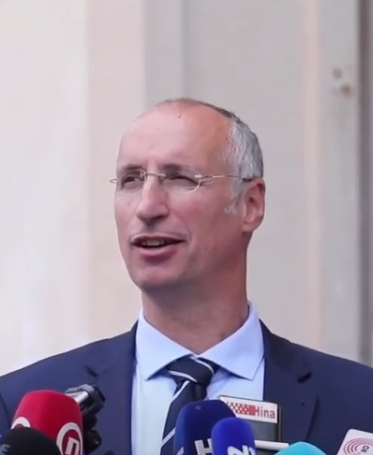
Candidate	Ivica Puljak	Zoran Đogaš
Party	Centre	Independent
Popular vote	27,496	13,243
Percentage	66.16%	31.86%
Mayor before election
Ivica Puljak
Centre
Elected mayor
Ivica Puljak
Centre

Elections were held in Split, Croatia, on 26 June 2022 for the 73rd Mayor of Split, the two deputy mayors and the 31 members of the Split City Council, as well as city district councils.

Snap elections were called due to the crisis in the city council, when the current mayor Ivica Puljak lost his majority and when his deputy Bojan Ivošević was charged with threatening a journalist. On April 8, Mayor Puljak and both his deputies resigned, setting a legal 90-day deadline for holding new mayoral elections. In the following days, several councilors also resigned, creating the conditions for holding council elections.

Ivica Puljak won reelection becoming first mayor of Split to do that, while his party Centre won 8 seats more than year before for a total of 15 out of 31 seat.

== Candidates ==
On 10 June 2022, State Election Committee of Croatia published list of nine candidates for the Mayor and eleven party lists running for the council.

Candidate	Party affiliation	Running mates	Party affiliation	Notes about the candidate
Ivica Puljak	Centre	Bojan Ivošević	Centre	Particle physicist and university professor at the Faculty of Electrical Engineering, Mechanical Engineering and Naval Architecture, University of Split, current mayor of Split
Ivica Puljak	Centre	Antonio Kuzmanić	Centre	Particle physicist and university professor at the Faculty of Electrical Engineering, Mechanical Engineering and Naval Architecture, University of Split, current mayor of Split
Zoran Đogaš	Independent, proposed by Croatian Democratic Union	Tomislav Šuta	Croatian Democratic Union	Neuroscientist and former dean of the Faculty of Medicine, University of Split
Zoran Đogaš	Independent, proposed by Croatian Democratic Union	Zrinka Mužinić Bikić	Croatian Democratic Union	Neuroscientist and former dean of the Faculty of Medicine, University of Split
Davor Matijević	Social Democratic Party	Dino Sinovčić	Social Democratic Party	Current member of city council and secretary branch of SDP in Split, president of Blatine city district and a member of the Main Board of the SDP of Croatia
Davor Matijević	Social Democratic Party	Suzana Piacun	Social Democratic Party	Current member of city council and secretary branch of SDP in Split, president of Blatine city district and a member of the Main Board of the SDP of Croatia
Željko Kerum	Croatian Civic Party	Igor Stanišić	Croatian Civic Party	Entrepreneur and former Mayor of Split (2009-2013)
Željko Kerum	Croatian Civic Party	Lidija Bekavac	Croatian Civic Party	Entrepreneur and former Mayor of Split (2009-2013)
Ante Franić	Independent	Jadranka Bandalo-Žebčević	Independent	Former member of SDP and candidate for Mayor of Split in 2021
Ante Franić	Independent	Goran Soko	Independent	Former member of SDP and candidate for Mayor of Split in 2021
Josip Markotić	Bridge of Independent Lists	Ivica Grković	Bridge of Independent Lists	Doctor of bioethics and former professor on Catholic University of Croatia, current member of city council
Josip Markotić	Bridge of Independent Lists	Ivana Ljulj Cvitanić	Bridge of Independent Lists	Doctor of bioethics and former professor on Catholic University of Croatia, current member of city council
Aris Zlodre	Homeland Movement	Željka Mustapić	Homeland Movement	Entrepreneur
Aris Zlodre	Homeland Movement	Davor Stipan	Homeland Movement	Entrepreneur
Tamara Visković	We can!	Marinko Biškić	We can!	Philosopher and art historian
Tamara Visković	We can!	Tomo Matičević	We can!	Philosopher and art historian
Kristina Vidan	Smart for Split and Dalmatia	Mariana Bucat	Smart for Split and Dalmatia	Current member of city council
Kristina Vidan	Smart for Split and Dalmatia	Lucia Grčić	Smart for Split and Dalmatia	Current member of city council

== Mayoral election ==
Candidates		First round		Runoff	
Candidate	Party	Votes	%	Votes	%
Ivica Puljak	Centre	22,561	48.73	27,496	66.16
Zoran Đogaš	Croatian Democratic Union; Croatian Peasant Party	11,887	25.67	13,243	31.86
Željko Kerum	Croatian Civic Party	3,677	7.94		
Josip Markotić	The Bridge	2,100	4.53		
Aris Zlodre	Homeland Movement; Croatian Demochristian Party; Croatian Party of Rights; Croatian Sovereignists	1,802	3.89		
Davor Matijević	Social Democratic Party; Croatian Party of Pensioners	1,779	3.84		
Tamara Visković	We can! New Left	861	1.85		
Kristina Vidan	Smart for Split and Dalmatia	595	1.28		
Ante Franić	Independent	309	0.66		
Valid votes:		45,571	98.49	40,739	98.02
Invalid votes:		700	1.51	823	1.98
Turnout:		46,271	31.57	41,562	28.35
Expected voters:		146,578		146,583	
The percentages of votes from each list are calculated from number of valid voters The percentages of valid and invalid votes are calculated from the turnout number The turnout percentage is calculated from the number of expected voters
Source: State election commission

== Council election ==
Party list	Previous seats	Votes	%	Seats	%	Seat change
Centre	7 / 31	19,376	42.47	15 / 31	48.39	▲8
Croatian Democratic Union; Croatian Peasant Party	9 / 31	10.866	23.81	8 / 31	25.81	▼1
Croatian Civic Party	4 / 31	3,246	7.11	2 / 31	6.45	▼2
The Bridge	3 / 31	3,017	6.61	2 / 31	6.45	▼1
Social Democratic Party of Croatia; Croatian Party of Pensioners	3 / 31	2,626	5.75	2 / 31	6.45	▼1
Homeland Movement; Croatian Demochristian Party; Croatian Party of Rights; Croatian Sovereignists	0 / 31	2,571	5.63	2 / 31	6.45	▲2
We can! New Left	2 / 31	1,733	3.79	0 / 31	0.00	▼2
Smart for Split and Dalmatia	1 / 31	1,168	2.56	0 / 31	0.00	▼1
Independent Youth List; Croatian Social Liberal Party	0 / 31	562	1.23	0 / 31	0.00	0
Independent list of Ante Franić	0 / 31	335	0.73	0 / 31	0.00	0
Croatian People's Party – Liberal Democrats; Croatian Labourists – Labour Party	0 / 31	122	0.26	0 / 31	0.00	0
Total:		45,622	98.53	31		0
Invalid votes:		681	1.47			
Turnout:		46,317	31.60			
Expected voters:		146,578				
The percentages of votes from each list are calculated from number of valid voters The percentages of valid and invalid votes are calculated from the turnout number The turnout percentage is calculated from the number of expected voters
Source: State election commission

== Opinion polls ==
=== Mayoral election ===
==== First round ====
Polling Firm	Fieldwork date	Sample size	Ivica Puljak	Zoran Đogaš	Željko Kerum	Davor Matijević	Josip Markotić	Kristina Vidan	Tamara Visković	Aris Zlodre	Ante Franić	Others	Undecided	Lead
Election results	26 June	—	48.73	25.67	7.94	3.84	4.53	1.28	1.85	3.89	0.66	–	–	23.06
Ipsos	15–18 June	600	37.5	23.6	11.0	3.8	6.6	3.0	4.0	3.0	–	–	7.5	13.9
Promocija plus	15–18 June	600	35.3	23.7	9.4	6.2	3.7	3.4	2.7	2.1	0.5	–	12.9	11.6

==== Second round ====
Polling Firm	Fieldwork date	Sample size	Ivica Puljak	Zoran Đogaš	Željko Kerum	Undecided	Will not vote	Lead
Election results	10 July	—	66.16	31.86	–	–	–	34.30
Promocija plus	30 June–1 July	600	59.7	30.1	–	8.0	2.2	29.6
Promocija plus	15–18 June	600	47.5	37.1	–	7.8	7.6	10.4
Promocija plus	15–18 June	600	53.7	–	24.2	9.7	12.4	29.5
Promocija plus	15–18 June	600	–	51.8	16.3	12.9	19.0	35.5

=== Council election ===
Polling Firm	Fieldwork date	Sample size	Centar	HDZ HSS	HGS	SDP HSU	Pametno	Most	DP HDS HSP HS	Možemo NL	NLM HSLS	List of Ante Franić	HNS-LD HL-SR	Others	Undecided	Lead
Election results	26 June	—	42.47	23.81	7.11	6.75	2.56	6.61	5.63	3.79	1.23	0.73	0.26	–	–	18.66
Seat average (D'Hondt method)			11	9	3	3	2	3	–	–	–	–	–	–	–	2
Ipsos	15–18 June	600	27.0	23.4	8.3	7.5	3.9	9.2	–	6.1	–	–	–	7.6	7.0	3.6
Promocija plus	15–18 June	600	31.2	20.7	7.3	7.1	6.7	5.4	4.7	3.7	1.2	0.5	0.3	–	11.2	10.5

== See also ==
- 2021 Croatian local elections
- 2021 Split local elections
- 2022 Split district elections
- List of mayors in Croatia
- List of mayors of Split
