= 2021 Rijeka local elections =

Local elections in Croatia

2021 Rijeka mayoral election
- 16 May 2021; 30 May 2021 (runoff for mayor)
- Mayoral election
- Turnout: 37.60% (first round) ▲0.95% 34.16% (runoff) ▲5.74%
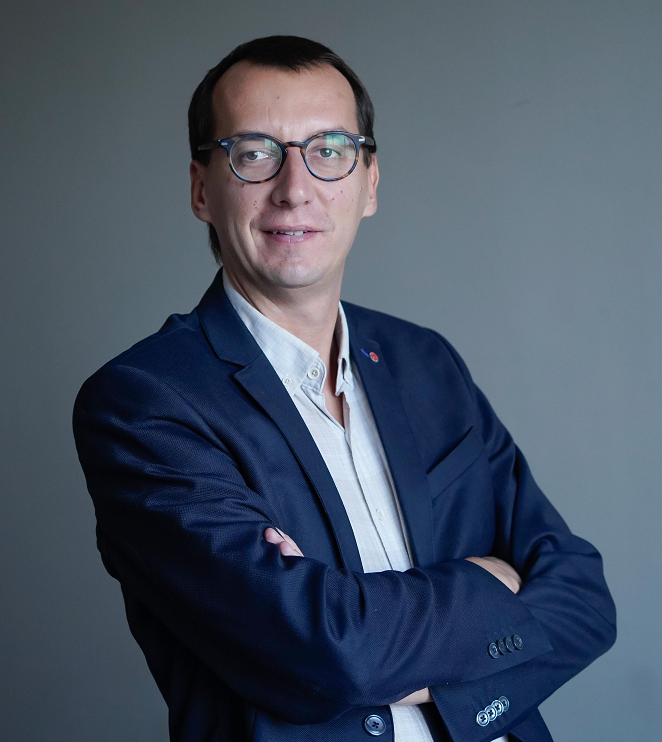

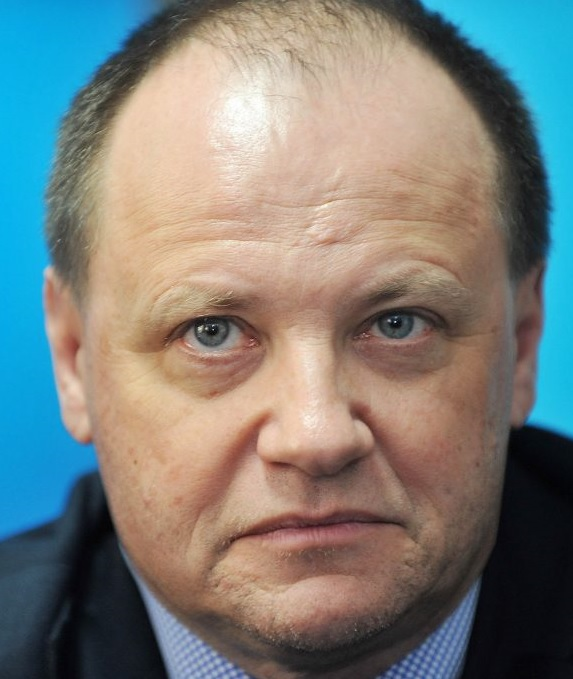
Candidate	Marko Filipović	Davor Štimac
Party	SDP	Independent
First round	11,970; 30.25%	6,371; 16.10%
Runoff	18,902; 52.64%	15,795; 43.99%
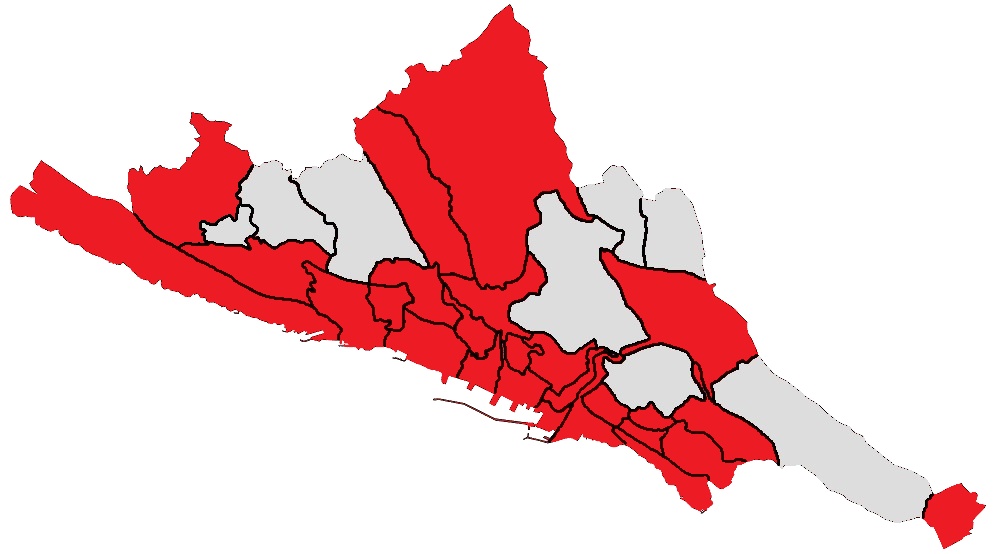
- Results of the second round in all local committees: the candidate with the majority of votes in each local committee: Marko Filipović Davor Štimac
Mayor before election
Vojko Obersnel
SDP
Elected mayor
Marko Filipović
SDP
- City Council election
- All 31 seats in the Rijeka City Council; 16 seats needed for a majority
Party	Leader	Vote %	Seats	+/–
SDP coalition	Marko Filipović	28.05	10	−5
HDZ	Josip Ostrogović	16.30	6	−1
Independent list of Davor Štimac	Davor Štimac	11.11	4	+4
Most	Marin Miletić	10.38	4	+2
PGS	Nikola Ivaniš	8.62	3	+3
We can!	Nebojša Zelič	7.64	2	+2
AM	Vedran Vivoda	5.58	2	−3
This lists parties that won seats. See the complete results below.

The 2021 Rijeka local elections were the elections for the 15th mayor of Rijeka, the two deputy mayors and the 31 members of the Rijeka City Council. It was a part of the Croatian local elections which were held on 16 May 2021. The incumbent mayor, Vojko Obersnel of the Social Democratic Party (SDP), announced on 6 November 2020 that he would be retiring at the end of his sixth consecutive term in office. The first round saw Marko Filipović (30.25%) and Davor Štimac (16.10%). Filipović was defending the "long-time stronghold" of the SDP against independent centre-right candidate Štimac.

== Results ==
=== Mayoral election ===
Candidates		First round		Runoff	
Candidate	Party	Votes	%	Votes	%
Marko Filipović	Social Democratic Party	11,970	30.25	18,902	52.64
Davor Štimac	Independent	6,371	16.10	11,210	46.13
Josip Ostrogović	Croatian Democratic Union	5,587	14.11		
Marin Miletić	Bridge of Independent Lists	4,474	11.30		
Nikola Ivaniš	Alliance of Primorje-Gorski Kotar	4,396	11.10		
Nebojša Zelič	We Can!	1,707	4.31		
Ana Blečić-Jelenović	List for Fiume	1,515	3.82		
Katarina Peović	Worker's Front	1,142	2.88		
Vedran Vivoda	Youth Action	979	2.47		
Hrvoje Burić	Bura	444	1.12		
Antun Antunović	Independent	311	0.78		
Valid votes:		38,896	98.37	34,697	96.63
Invalid votes:		644	1.63	1,211	3.37
Turnout:		39,540	37.60	35,908	34.13
Expected voters:		105,231		105,195	
The percentages of votes from each candidate are calculated from number of valid voters The percentages of valid and invalid votes are calculated from the turnout number The turnout percentage is calculated from the number of expected voters
Source: City of Rijeka (Election results)

=== City council election ===
Party list	Previous seats	Votes	%	Seats	%	Seat change
Social Democratic Party of Croatia; Croatian Party of Pensioners; Istrian Democratic Assembly; Croatian Peasant Party	15 / 37	10,883	28.05	10 / 31	32.26	▼5
Croatian Democratic Union	7 / 37	6,325	16.30	6 / 31	19.35	▼1
Independent list of Davor Štimac	0 / 37	4,312	11.11	4 / 31	12.90	▲4
The Bridge	2 / 37	4,030	10.38	4 / 31	12.90	▲2
Alliance of Primorje-Gorski Kotar; Croatian Labourists – Labour Party	0 / 37	3,348	8.62	3 / 31	9.68	▲3
We can! New Left	0 / 37	2,964	7.64	2 / 31	6.45	▲2
Youth Action; Union of Kvarner; Alternativa	5 / 35	2,168	5.58	2 / 31	6.45	▼3
List for Fiume	2 / 37	1,921	4.95	0 / 31	0.00	▼2
Worker's Front	0 / 37	1,512	3.89	0 / 31	0.00	0
Homeland Movement; Croatian Party of Rights	0 / 37	769	1.98	0 / 31	0.00	0
Bura	4 / 37	563	1.45	0 / 31	0.00	▼4
Total:		38,795	98.19	31		▼6
Invalid votes:		714	1.81			
Turnout:		39,509	37.55			
Expected voters:		105,231				
The percentages of votes from each list are calculated from number of valid voters The percentages of valid and invalid votes are calculated from the turnout number The turnout percentage is calculated from the number of expected voters
Source: City of Rijeka ('Election results')

=== Serbian minority by-election ===
Party list	Votes	%	Seats	%	Seat change
Social Democratic Party of Croatia; Independent Democratic Serb Party; Alliance of Primorje-Gorski Kotar; Istrian Democratic Assembly; Croatian Party of Pensioners; Croatian Peasant Party	165	51.24	1 / 1	100.00	▲1
List for Fiume; Democratic Alliance of Serbs	157	48.76	0 / 1	0.00	0
Total:	322	96.12	1		▲1
Invalid votes:	13	3.88			
Turnout:	335	4.82			
Expected voters:	6,953				
The percentages of votes from each list are calculated from number of valid voters The percentages of valid and invalid votes are calculated from the turnout number The turnout percentage is calculated from the number of expected voters
Source: City of Rijeka ('Election results')

== Opinion polls ==
=== Mayoral election ===
==== First round ====
Polling Firm	Fieldwork date	Sample size	Marko Filipović	Davor Štimac	Nikola Ivaniš	Josip Ostrogović	Marin Miletić	Nebojša Zelič	Ana Blečić Jelenović	Katarina Peović	Vedran Vivoda	Hrvoje Burić	Antun Antunović	Undecided	Lead
Election results	16 May	—	30.3	16.1	11.1	14.1	11.3	4.3	3.8	2.9	2.5	1.1	0.8	-	14.2
IPSOS	4–5 May	600	22.8	21.2	14.4	11.5	9.6	3.5	3.0	2.9	2.0	1.8	1.2	6.3	1.6
MASMI	28 April – 3 May	600	23.3	16.3	12.1	14.1	10.1	4.9	4.3	4.5	2.0	-	-	-	7.0
IPSOS PULS	16−21 April	800	22.9	14.9	13.8	10.9	12.5	4.5	2.6	4.2	3.0	-	-	-	8.0
MASMI	11–14 March	600	20.6	14.5	7.9	13.3	14.6	3.2	-	6.8	4.5	3.2	-	-	6.0
IPSOS PULS	27 February – 3 March	800	15.4	14.9	10.9	8.1	15.8	4.2	6.3	5.6	3.2	1.9	-	-	0.4

==== Second round ====
Polling Firm	Fieldwork date	Sample size	Marko Filipović	Davor Štimac	Nikola Ivaniš	Marin Miletić	Josip Ostrogović	Undecided	Will not vote	Lead
IPSOS	4–5 May	600	40.4	46.9	–	–	–	4.5	7.4	6.5
IPSOS	4–5 May	600	38.8	–	38.8	–	–	6.9	15.1	0.0
IPSOS	4–5 May	600	49.2	–	–	30.7	–	8.1	11.3	18.5
IPSOS	4–5 May	600	52.2	–	–	–	31.0	6.5	9.7	21.2
MASMI	28 April – 3 May	600	39.1	36.4	–	–	–	12.0	12.5	2.7
MASMI	28 April – 3 May	600	48.3	–	–	–	22.1	13.1	16.5	26.2
MASMI	28 April – 3 May	600	49.0	–	–	20.7	–	−	−	28.3

=== Rijeka City Council ===
Polling Firm	Fieldwork date	Sample size	SDP	Davor Štimac List	PGS	HDZ	Most	Možemo	RI	RF	DP	AM	Others	Undecided	Lead
Election results	16 May	—	28.1	11.1	8.6	16.3	10.4	7.6	4.9	3.9	2.0	5.6	1.5	-	11.8
IPSOS	4–5 May	600	24.2	17.5	15	12.7	7.8	4.8	4.1	2.9	2.0	1.5	-	6.9	6.7
MASMI	28 April – 3 May	600	23.6	13.1	8.0	16.7	9.3	-	4.7	-	-	4.9	-	-	6.9
IPSOS PULS	16−21 April	800	25.3	12.2	9.4	12.6	10.7	7.1	4.8	2.8	2.2	6.3	-	-	12.8
IPSOS PULS	27 February – 3 March	800	21.6	12.7	5.8	11.0	11.3	5.8	5.4	3.6	1.1	7.7	-	9.9	8.9
MASMI	11–14 March	600	20.9	12.1	5.8	13.9	9.5	8.4	5.1	4.8	-	5.1	-	-	7.0

== Background ==
Workers' Front's announcement of Katarina Peović's candidature for the mayor of Rijeka caused a rift in the Green–Left Coalition and ultimately resulted in the expulsion of the Workers' Front from the coalition in December 2020, ahead of the elections.

== Aftermath ==
The constituent session of the city council was held on June 29 at the Croatian Cultural Center in Sušak. Ana Trošelj (PGS) was elected president of the council, and Josip Ostrogović (HDZ) and Željko Jovanović (SDP) were elected vice presidents. The majority in the council will be made up of the SDP coalition and the coalition of PGS and Labor, while the opposition includes HDZ, Most and the coalition of AM, UK and Alternativa.

Due to the failure to represent the representatives of the Serbian national minority in the council, by-elections were announced for October 3, 2021 for the election of one representative of the minority. This will increase the number of representatives in the council to 32.

== See also ==
- List of mayors in Croatia
- 2021 Zagreb local elections
- 2021 Split local elections
- 2021 Osijek local elections
