= University of Split Library =

Croatian academic library

Coordinates: 43.5110°N 16.4679°E

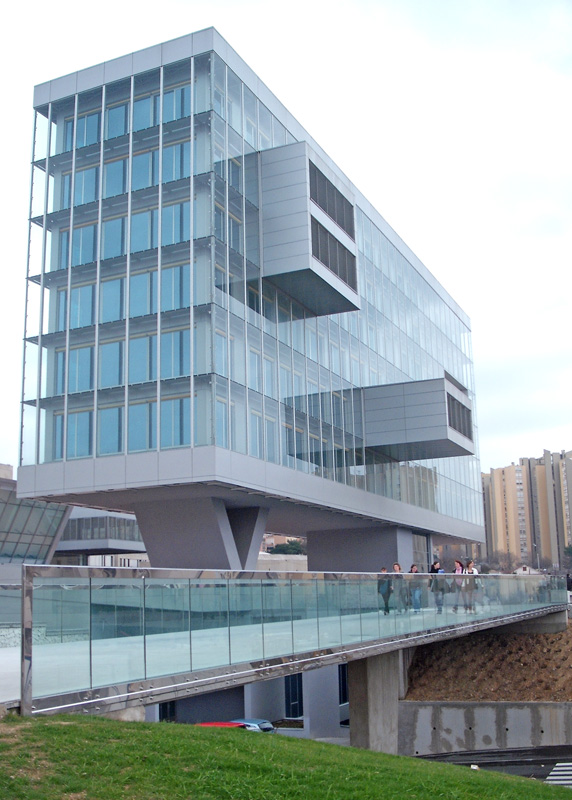
University of Split's library and the glass bridge

The University of Split Library is a scientific institution and the central library of the University of Split, which acquires and distributes information sources for the needs of all Split studies, providing users with appropriate conditions for learning and study work.

After the National and University Libraries in Zagreb, it is the richest library in the Croatia. Its fund today has around 400,000 books and 12,000 serial publications, and its special collections contain a rich collection of rare and valuable books, geographical maps and atlases, pictorial materials and musicals.

== History ==
The university library began its work in 1903 under the name of the City Library in one of the rooms of the Slavic People's Reading Room in Split. The construction of the city library was particularly advocated by prof. Josip Barač, who financially supported the construction of the Split library and donated his personal library to this library. The founder and first chairman of this library was high school professor Dr. Dušan Manger, who headed the institution until his death in 1940.

From the very beginning, the library operated in difficult spatial conditions. In 1905, with the support of the municipality, the library rented new premises on the ground floor of the Illich house on Obala, however, as the number of books grew significantly due to continuous donations, the municipal administration moved it in 1910 to premises on the first floor of the Baroque Bernardi Palace, on Pistura, where was officially opened for visitors in January 1912.

During the First World War, the Library was closed to the public, but was reopened at the beginning of 1919. By the decision of the Provincial Administration, it is entitled to a compulsory copy of all printed publications from the area of Dalmatia, thus assuming the role of a city and provincial library, with a fund of over 20,000 volumes. For this reason, in the 1920s, new rooms were arranged in the Library building.

The library continued its work during the Second World War, being the only refuge in the difficult conditions of the occupation where one could speak and read the Croatian language. At the beginning of 1945, the Library moved to the former premises of the Italian company Gabinetto di lettura on Trg Republike ("Repiblic Square"), from which it took over a valuable fund, full of rare books and manuscripts. At the same time, it took over the fund of other defunct Split institutions (the Italian Biblioteca Popolare, the Munich Academy and the German Consulate), which increased its fund to more than 45,000 books.

In 1946, the Library was moved to a Neo-Renaissance palace building built at the beginning of the 20th century. In the same year, by decision of the Ministry of Education of the Republic of Croatia, it acquired the right to a compulsory copy of all publications printed in Croatia, so by the 1960s, its collection already contained over 130,000 books and a significant number of periodicals, which is why the building had to be extended.

In 1962, the Council for Culture of the Municipality of Split renamed the name of the library Scientific Library. With the establishment of the University of Split in 1974, the Library became a formal member of the university and the central university library, but its name was formally changed only in 1992, and since then it has been called the University Library in Split.

At the beginning of the 21st century, an initiative was launched for the construction of a new building, which was built on the territory of the university campus and inaugurated in the fall of 2009, to begin work in the fall of 2010.

== Departments and collections ==
=== Department of books ===
About 400,000 volumes of books are stored in the book department, with an annual increase of 5,000 to 7,000 new titles. In this fund, the most valuable is the Dalmatica collection, which includes publications printed in Dalmatia, as well as those that talk about Dalmatia.

=== Department of periodicals ===
This department has about 12,000 titles of magazines and newspapers, which makes this department the richest stock of Dalmatian serial publications in addition to Croatia. Some of the titles are Gazzeta di Zara (1834–1850), Zora Dalmatinska (1844–1918), Smotra dalmatinska (1888–1918), Narodni list, Jedinstvo, Jadranska pošta, Novo doba, and many others.

=== Department of Special Collections ===
This department houses collections of old and valuable manuscripts (from the 15th century to 1850), a collection of manuscript materials (from the 13th to the 20th century), a graphic collection (from the 17th century), a collection of geographical maps and atlases (from 16th to 19th centuries), music collection, collection of visual material and collection of small print.
