= 2021 Split local elections =

Local election in Croatia

- 16 May 2021 (first round); 30 May 2021 (second round)
- Turnout: 43.97% (first round) ▼1.54% 43.53% (runoff) ▲5.46%
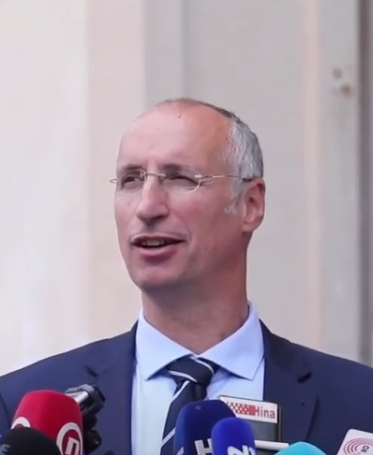

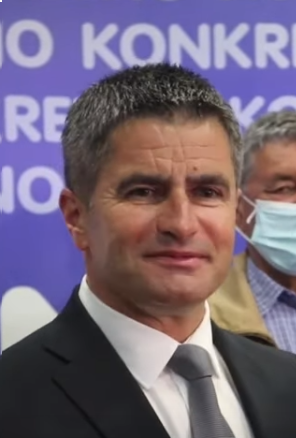
Candidate	Ivica Puljak	Vice Mihanović
Party	Centre	HDZ
Popular vote	35,565	27,106
Percentage	55.06%	41,96%
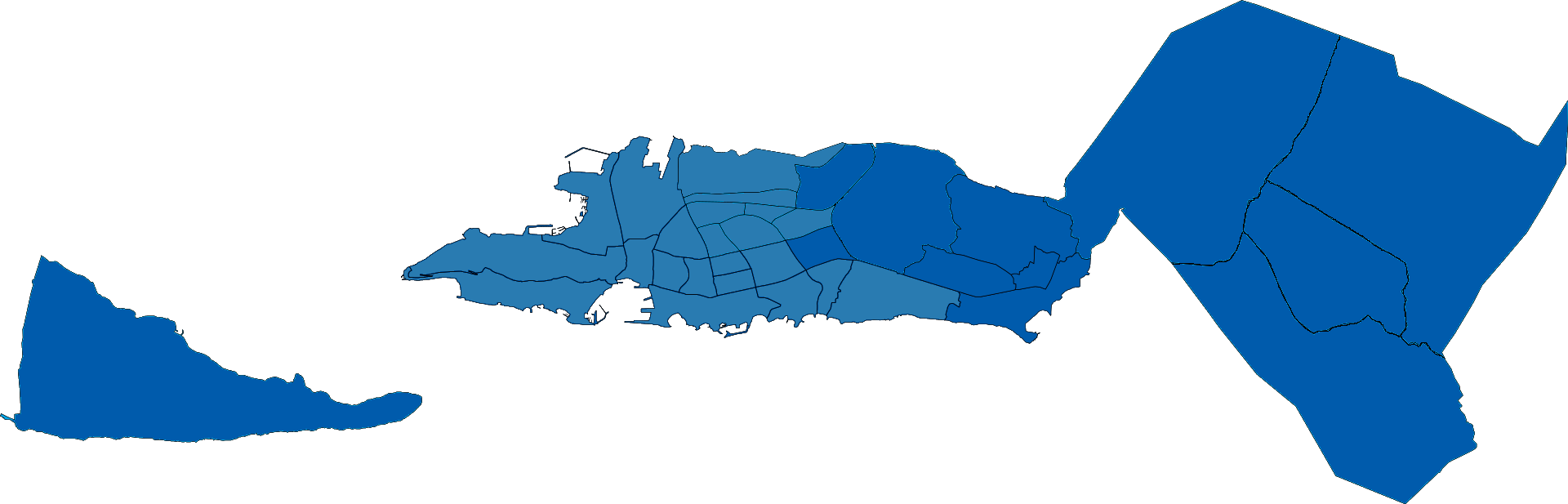
- Results of the second round in all Districts of Split: the candidate with the majority of votes in each district: Ivica Puljak Vice Mihanović
Mayor before election
Andro Krstulović Opara
HDZ
Elected mayor
Ivica Puljak
Centre

Elections were held in Split, Croatia, on 16 and 30 May 2021 for the 72nd Mayor of Split, the two deputy mayors and the 31 members of the Split City Council, as a part of the 2021 Croatian local elections. The incumbent mayor, Andro Krstulović Opara of the Croatian Democratic Union, announced on 6 February 2021 that he will not run for another term because of his health condition.

== Mayoral election ==
Candidates		First round		Runoff	
Candidate	Party	Votes	%	Votes	%
Ivica Puljak	Centre	17,500	26.82	35,565	55.06
Vice Mihanović	Croatian Democratic Union	15,159	23.23	27,106	41.96
Željko Kerum	Croatian Civic Party	9,762	14.96		
Ante Franić	Social Democratic Party of Croatia; Croatian Party of Pensioners	4,856	7.44		
Branka Ramljak	Independent	4,563	6.99		
Jakov Prkić	We can! New Left; Smart for Split and Dalmatia	3,779	5.79		
Ivica Grković	Most	3,098	4.74		
Nansi Ivanišević	Homeland Movement	2,405	3.68		
Zdeslav Benzon	Croatian Social Liberal Party	1,642	2.51		
Marijo Popović	Croatian Party of Rights; Croatian Sovereignists; Croatian Conservative Party; Croatian Growth	790	1.21		
Siniša Vuco	Croatian Peasant Party	365	0.55		
Valid votes:		63,919	98.02	62,671	97.10
Invalid votes:		1,289	1.98	1,871	2.90
Turnout:		65,246	43.97	64,592	43.53
Expected voters:		148,374		148,369	
The percentages of votes from each candidate are calculated from number of valid voters. The percentages of valid and invalid votes are calculated from the turnout number. The turnout percentage is calculated from the number of expected voters.

== Council election ==
Party list	Previous seats	Votes	%	Seats	%	Seat change
Croatian Democratic Union	11 / 35	14.837	23.27	9 / 31	29.03	▼2
Centre	7 / 35	12.862	20.17	7 / 31	22.58	0
Croatian Civic Party	8 / 35	7.563	11.86	4 / 31	12.90	▼4
Social Democratic Party of Croatia; Croatian Party of Pensioners	4 / 35	6.225	9.76	3 / 31	9.68	▼1
We can! New Left; Smart for Split and Dalmatia	0 / 35	6.088	9.54	3 / 31	9.68	▲3
Most	5 / 35	5.074	7.95	3 / 31	9.68	▼2
Independent list of Tomislav Mamić	0 / 35	3.886	6.09	2 / 31	6.45	▲2
Homeland Movement	0 / 35	2.899	4.54	0 / 31	0.00	0
Croatian Social Liberal Party	0 / 35	1.567	2.45	0 / 31	0.00	0
Croatian Party of Rights; Croatian Sovereignists; Croatian Conservative Party; Croatian Growth	0 / 35	1.125	1.76	0 / 31	0.00	0
Croatian People's Party - Liberal Democrats; Croatian Labourists – Labour Party; People's Party – Reformists	0 / 35	495	0.77	0 / 31	0.00	0
Workers' Front; Socialist Labour Party of Croatia	0 / 35	423	0.66	0 / 31	0.00	0
Croatian Demochristian Party; Croatian Peasant Party of Stjepan Radić; Party of Pensioners	0 / 35	359	0.56	0 / 31	0.00	0
Croatian Peasant Party	0 / 35	346	0.54	0 / 31	0.00	0
Total:		63.749	97.82	31		▼4
Invalid votes:		1.421	2.18			
Turnout:		65.170	43.92			
Expected voters:		148.374				
The percentages of votes from each list are calculated from number of valid voters The percentages of valid and invalid votes are calculated from the turnout number The turnout percentage is calculated from the number of expected voters
Source:State Election Committee (Državno izborno povjerenstvo)

== See also ==
- 2021 Croatian local elections
- 2021 Zagreb local elections
- 2021 Rijeka local elections
- 2021 Osijek local elections
- 2022 Split district elections
- List of mayors in Croatia
- List of mayors of Split
