= Ivica Puljak =

Croatian politician (born 1969)

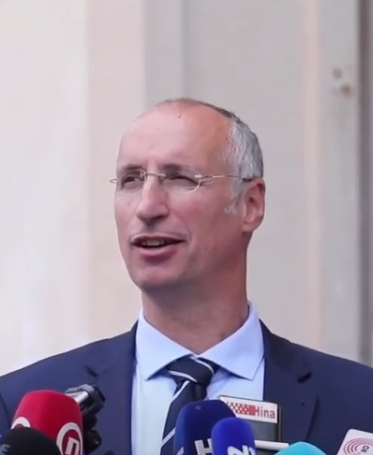
- Puljak in 2021

Mayor of Split
- In office 15 July 2022 – 9 June 2025
- Deputy: Bojan Ivošević; Antonio Kuzmanić
- Preceded by: Himself; Mirna Veža (Acting)
- Succeeded by: Tomislav Šuta
- In office 7 June 2021 – 8 April 2022
- Deputy: Bojan Ivošević; Antonio Kuzmanić
- Preceded by: Andro Krstulović Opara
- Succeeded by: Mirna Veža (Acting); Himself

Personal details
- Born: 27 August 1969 (age 57) Split, SR Croatia, SFR Yugoslavia
- Party: Centre
- Spouse: Marijana Rakuljić (m. 1995)
- Children: 3
- Education: University of Split; University of Zagreb; Pierre and Marie Curie University
- Occupation: Politician; physicist; professor
- Awards: Order of Danica with the face of Ruđer Bošković
- Website: ivicapuljak.com

Ivica Puljak (born 27 August 1969) is a Croatian politician, particle physicist and professor at University of Split's FESB division. He served as mayor of Split from 2021 to 2025 and was the president of the Centre political party.

== Life ==
=== Early life and education ===
Puljak was born in 1969 in Split, SR Croatia, Yugoslavia. His parents are from the Dalmatian Hinterland with his father, Zdravko, being from Zagvozd and mother, Jaka, from Drniš. Growing up in Split and attending primary and high school in his hometown, he dreamed of becoming a footballer for the local club, Hajduk.

=== Personal life ===
Puljak is married to Marijana Rakuljić, the founder of Pametno and a member of Croatian Parliament. They have two daughters and a son together. He is an atheist.

== Scientific career ==
He has been working for his PhD thesis at Laboratory Leprince Ringuet (LLR) at Ecole Polytechnique, Palaiseau, and got his PhD on search for Higgs boson from University Paris VI in 2000 for which he was awarded the best CMS thesis award in 2001. He is a member of CMS collaboration since 1994 and MAGIC collaboration since 2009. He was a co-coordinator of more than a hundred scientists from all over the world working on the most sensitive and precise of all physical processes through which the Higgs boson was discovered and measured. His research interests are the construction of the electromagnetic calorimeter of the CMS detector, development and implementation of algorithms for the electron reconstruction of the CMS detector, physics of the Higgs boson and astroparticle physics. He was awarded the Annual Award for Science in 2013.

== Political career ==
Puljak ran for and won the 2021 Split mayoral elections. After about one year, a special election was summoned due to the dissolution of the city council, where Puljak had lost his majority. Adding to the commotion, his deputy mayor, Bojan Ivošević, was charged with threatening a journalist. On 8 April, Mayor Puljak and both his deputies resigned. Ivica Puljak won the special election becoming the first mayor of Split to win more than one election and his party Centre won 15 seats out of 31 in the city council. On 18 May 2025, he won a plurality of 4,72% of votes; in the runoff election he won 46,81% of the votes, losing to HDZ's Tomislav Šuta. Upon losing the re-election, Puljak announced that he will retire from politics and resume his scientific career.

== See also ==
- List of mayors of Split
