= Democratic HSS =

Democratic HSS Demokratski HSS
- Abbreviation: DHSS
- President: Boro Bašljan
- Vice President: Andrija Juzbašić
- Founded: 30 January 2021; 4 years ago
- Split from: Croatian Peasant Party
- Headquarters: Gajeva ulica 32, Zagreb
- Membership (2022): 560
- Ideology: Agrarianism
- Political position: Centre-right
- Colours: Dark green

Website
- https://demokratskihss.org/

The Democratic HSS (Croatian: Demokratski HSS or DHSS) is an agrarian political party in Croatia.

The party was founded on 30 January 2021 by former members of the HSS. The first president of the party was Mateo Ivanac and the first vice president was Boro Bašljan.
