= Srinjine =

- Coordinates: 43.492382°N 16.600373°E

Area
  - Total: 10.1 km^{2} (3.9 sq mi)

Population (2021)
  - Total: 1,199
  - Density: 120/km^{2} (310/sq mi)

Srinjine is a village in Dalmatia, Croatia, located east of Split, Croatia. The population is 1,201 (census 2011).
