= Stobreč =

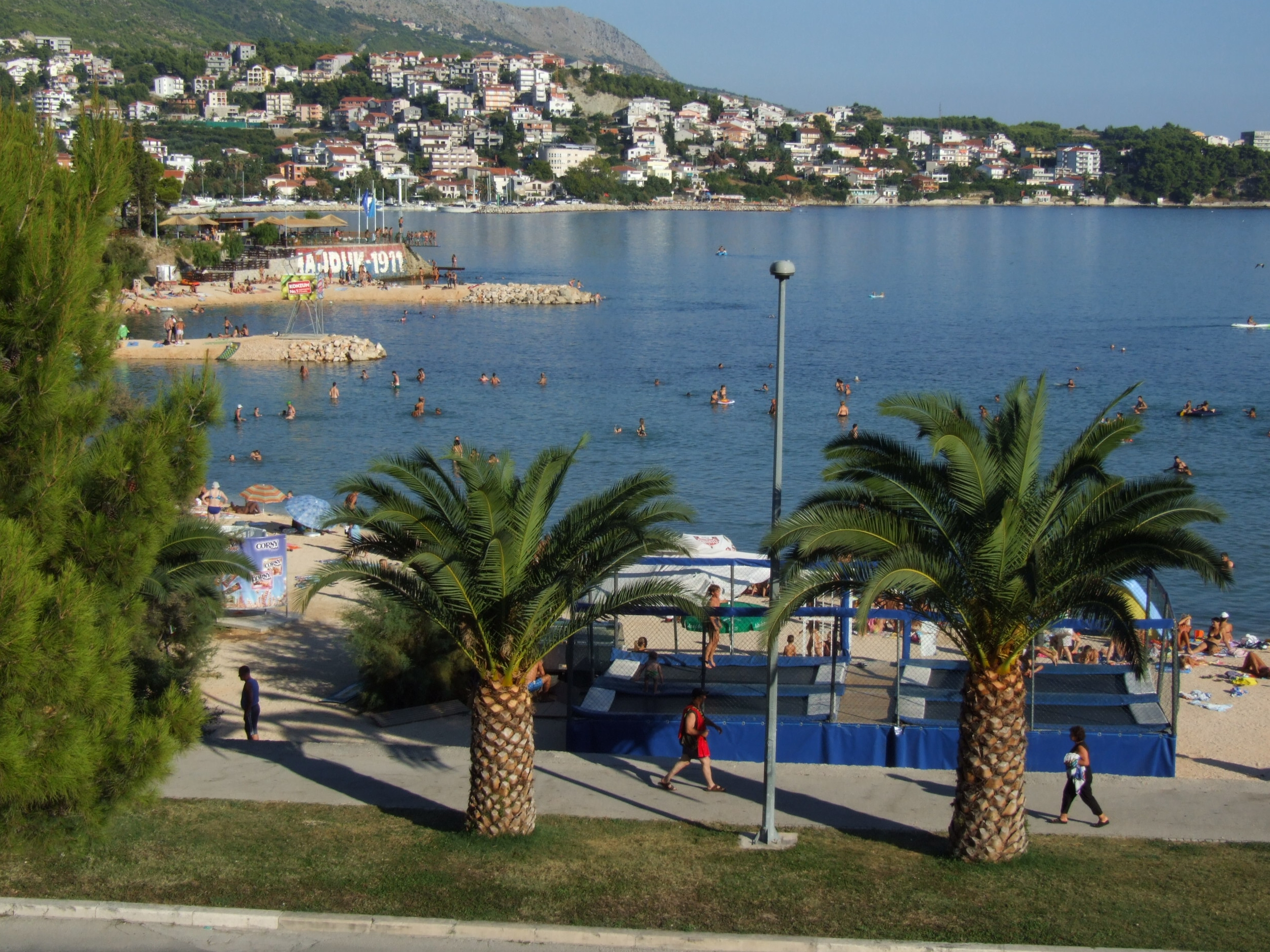
- Beach in Stobreč

- Location within Croatia
- Coordinates: 43°29′58″N 16°31′20″E
- Country: Croatia
- Greek colony of Aspálathos established: 6th century BC
- Diocletian's Palace built: AD 305
- Diocletian's Palace settled: AD 639

Area
  - Total: 1.4 km^{2} (0.54 sq mi)

Population (2021)
  - Total: 2,879
  - Density: 2,100/km^{2} (5,300/sq mi)
- Time zone: UTC+1 (CET)
  - Summer (DST): UTC+2 (CEST)

Stobreč (Italian: Stobrezio, Latin: Epetium, Greek: Επέτιον) is a historical village and now a tourist resort on the Adriatic Sea, in central Dalmatia, Croatia. Administratively it is part of the city of Split. It was founded as Epetium, an Ancient Greek colony on the Illyrian coast.

The largest body of recorded ancient history in the vicinity of Stobreč relates to the development of Diocletian's Palace, now within the present day city of Split. Diocletian founded this palace upon his retirement as Roman Emperor.

The sarcophagus of Lucius Artorius Castus, a Roman prefect thought to possibly be one of the inspirations for some of the legends of King Arthur, was discovered in Stobreč.

== Notable people ==
- Velimir Perasović, basketball coach and former player
- Alain Blažević, actor

== See also ==
- Diocletian's Palace
