= University of Split =

University in Split, Croatia

- Sveučilište u Splitu
- Motto: Upoznaj, Nauči, Istraži, Studiraj
- Motto in English: Meet, Learn, Explore, Study
- Type: Public - Research
- Established: 15 June 1974
- Affiliations: EUA
- Budget: 316 mil HRK
- Rector: Dragan Ljutić
- Student newspaper: Universitas
- Academic staff: 1,532
- Students: ≈18,000
- Location: Split, Croatia; 43.512°N 16.441°E
- Campus: Urban
- Colors: Blue
- Website: www.unist.hr

University rankings

Regional – Overall
- QS Emerging Europe and Central Asia: 134 (2022)

The University of Split (Croatian: Sveučilište u Splitu, Latin: Universitas Studiorum Spalatensis) is a university located in Split, Croatia. It was founded in 1974. and is organized in 13 faculties and 124 faculty programmes. As of 2009, a total of approximately 40,000 students have graduated, and a total of 337 doctoral degrees have been awarded.

University of Split is a member of EUA - European University Association.

== History ==
The University of Split was officially established on 15 June 1974 when the units having already had an effect in their professional, scientific and teaching areas entered its structure. As a predominant scientific and teaching public institution in the region the University of Split has expanded during the course of the past 30 years to include eleven Faculties, one Academy of Arts and four University Departments. There are about 25,000 students enrolled in the university's undergraduate, graduate and post-graduate programs. Currently a new campus is being built, which was supposed to be finished in 2014 but the economy crisis slowed it down so delays are to be expected. It will house all of the faculties, a large student center with a sports hall, sporting grounds and a University Library. There are new additions to the graduate programs like pharmacy, forensics, geodesy with new programs being added every year. The focus of the research work carried out by the university is on scientific areas with reference to disciplines characterized by natural, bio-medical, cultural, historical, social, economic and other features of the region as a part of the Croatian Adriatic and the Mediterranean region as a whole. The School of Medicine in Split started a Medicine program in English in the school year 2011/12. The program's curriculum is governed by the Bologna Process.

== Organization ==
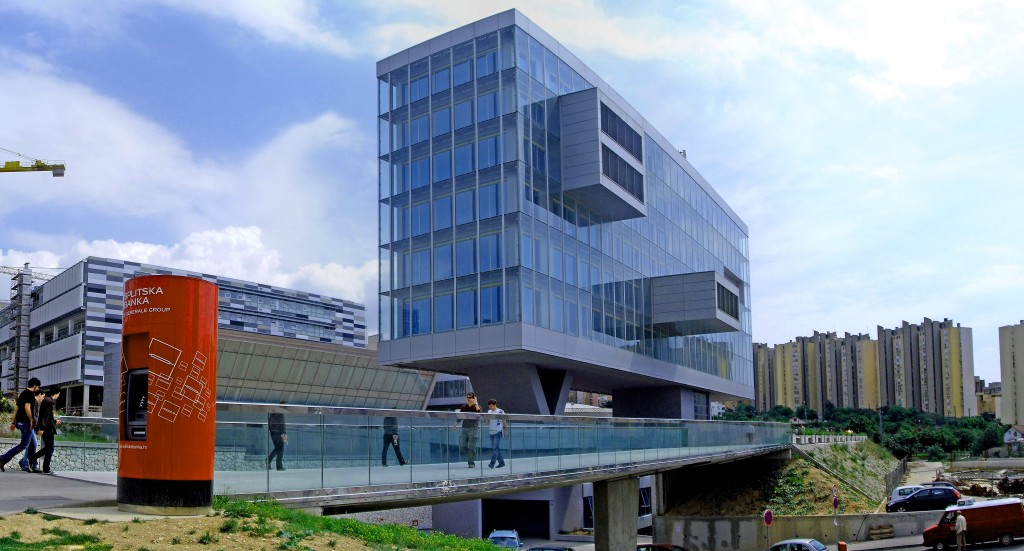
Split University Library

These are the faculties into which the university is divided:

- Faculty of Civil Engineering, Architecture and Geodesy (Fakultet građevinarstva, arhitekture i geodezije, FGAG, formerly Građevinsko-arhitektonski fakultet, GAF)
- Faculty of Science (Prirodoslovno-matematički fakultet, PMF)
- Faculty of Economics (Ekonomski fakultet, EF)
- Faculty of Law (Pravni fakultet)
- Catholic Faculty of Theology (Katolički bogoslovni fakultet)
- Faculty of Chemistry and Technology (Kemijsko-tehnološki fakultet, KTF)
- Faculty of Medicine (Medicinski fakultet, MEF)
- Faculty of Kinesiology (Kineziološki fakultet, KIF)
- Faculty of Maritime Studies (Pomorski fakultet, PF)
- Faculty of Philosophy (Filozofski fakultet, FF)
- Academy of Fine Arts (Umjetnička akademija)
- University Department of Professional Studies (Sveučilišni odjel za stručne studije)

The Pharmacy course is run jointly by the Faculty of Medicine and the Faculty of Chemical Engineering.

=== Faculty of Electrical Engineering, Mechanical Engineering and Naval Architecture, University of Split ===
The Faculty of Electrical Engineering, Mechanical Engineering and Naval Architecture (Croatian: Fakultet elektrotehnike, strojarstva i brodogradnje, abbr: FESB) is a faculty of the University of Split. The fundamental activities of the Faculty of Electrical Engineering, Mechanical Engineering and Naval Architecture in Split (FESB) are higher education teaching, research, developmental and professional work in the fields of Technical Sciences – in the scientific areas of Electrical Engineering, Mechanical Engineering, Naval Architecture, Computing and Fundamental Technical Sciences, and in the field of Natural Sciences, particularly in the subject areas of Mathematics and Physics. FESB is one of the largest constituents of the University of Split and largest technical faculty outside of Zagreb, capital of Republic of Croatia.

The faculty was established in 1960 as a fully autonomous and independent organization within the University of Zagreb. In 1971 the faculty was renamed as the Faculty of Electrical Engineering, Mechanical Engineering and Naval Architecture in Split (FESB). Since 1974 the faculty has been a constituent part of the University of Split. The faculty, as one of the founders of the university, significantly contributed to its establishment. The four-year Mechanical Engineering programme of study with its own curriculum was finally completed in 1976.

The first phase in the construction of the new Faculty building was completed in 1980 at the university campus and the second phase of the large project was completed in 2007. The faculty now has at its disposal almost 30,000 m^{2} of space with 19 classrooms, 11 computer laboratories and 95 research and teaching laboratories.

The faculty has an internal division of organizational units for teaching and scientific research, administrative and technical work. The department as an academic organizational unit participates in organizing and carrying out teaching, scientific and professional work. Faculty's Departments are:

- Department of Power Engineering,
- Department of Electronics and Computing,
- Department of Mathematics and Physics,
- Department of Mechanical Engineering and Naval Architecture,
- Department of Mechanical Engineering Technology,
- Department of General Courses.

Researchers from FESB collaborated or were leaders of various either international or bilateral projects such as the Croatian-Slovenian, Croatian-French, FP6 Marie Curie, FP7 as well as: COST, ALIS STATES, CEEPUS, COGITO; CMS and ALICE at CERN, Code development for integrated modelling within EuroFusion Consortium, EGEE II, MAGIC and several TEMPUS projects.

== Medical Studies in English ==
A Medicine program in English language started in the school year 2011/12. Upon completion of the 6-year program the students are awarded the degree of M.D. (Physician). Each year 60 students from Croatia and abroad are being enrolled. Half of the students are enrolled by RegioMed Kliniken in Germany and completes the initial 3 years with USSM before transferring. The curriculum is governed by the Bologna Process and is generally approved within the EU/EEA. In addition students have the possibility to write the U.S. (USMLE) and Canadian (LMCC) medical licensing exams.

== International rankings ==
University rankings

Global – Overall
- ARWU World: 701-800 (2019)

The university ranked 751–800 by QS, ranking 532 by USN, and 762 by CWUR, and 601–800 by THE.

== Gallery ==
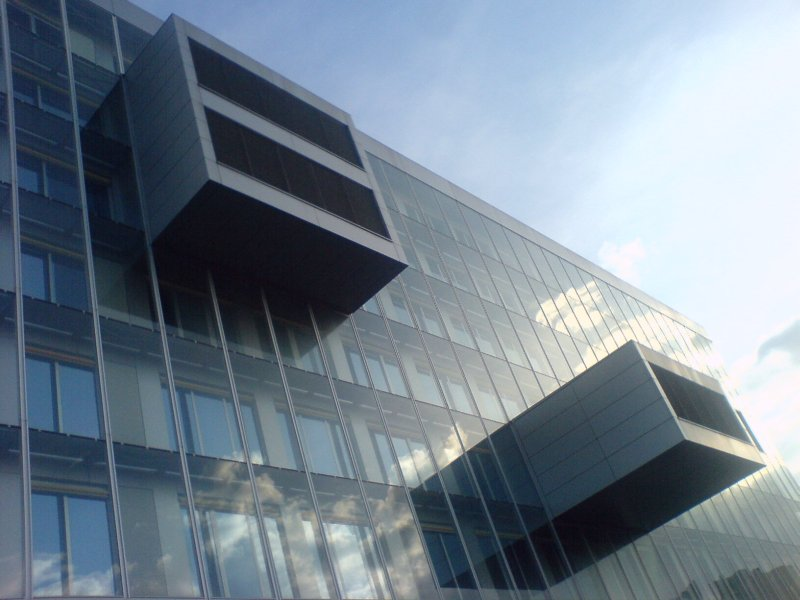
Library double glass façade

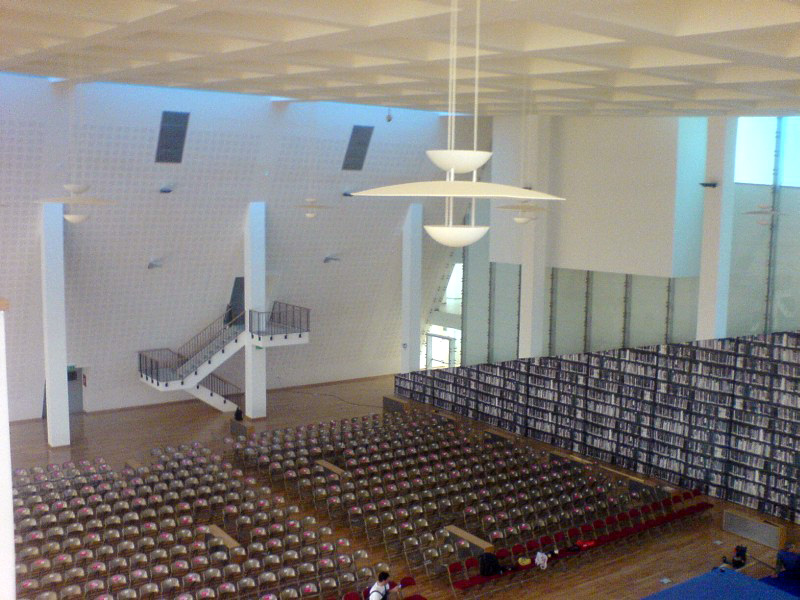
University Library interior (with no furniture, several weeks before the opening)

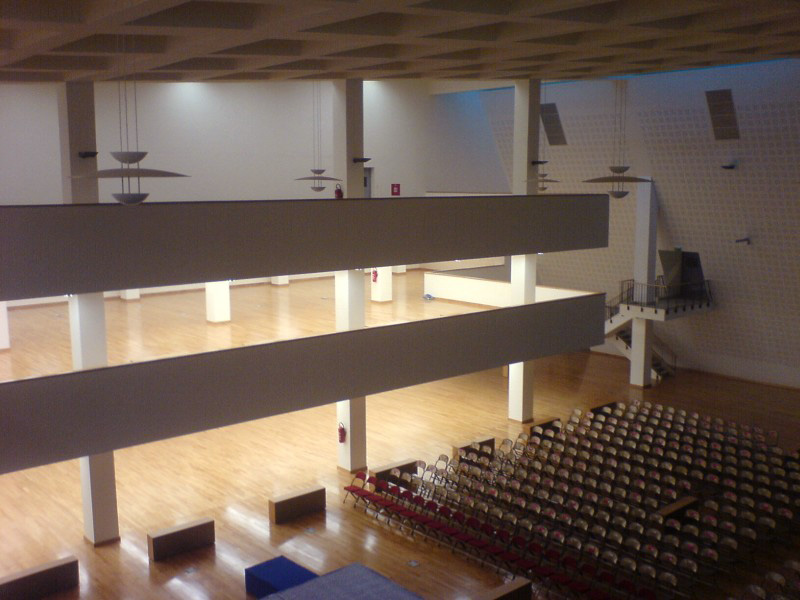
Library interior before the opening

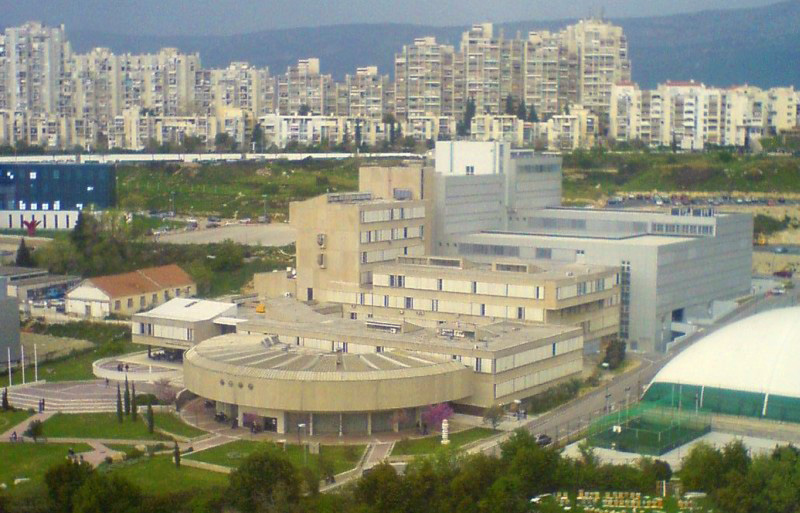
Faculty of Electrical Engineering, Mechanical Engineering and Naval Architecture in Split.

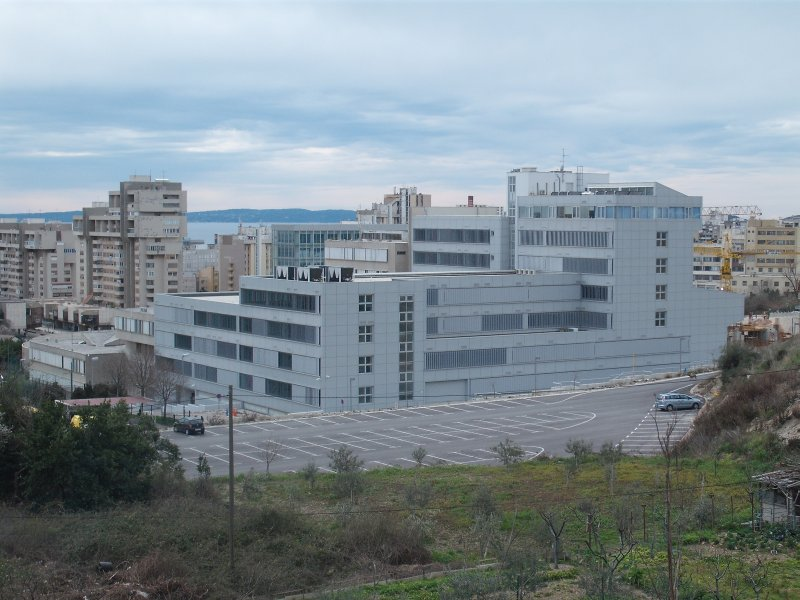
FESB, north view

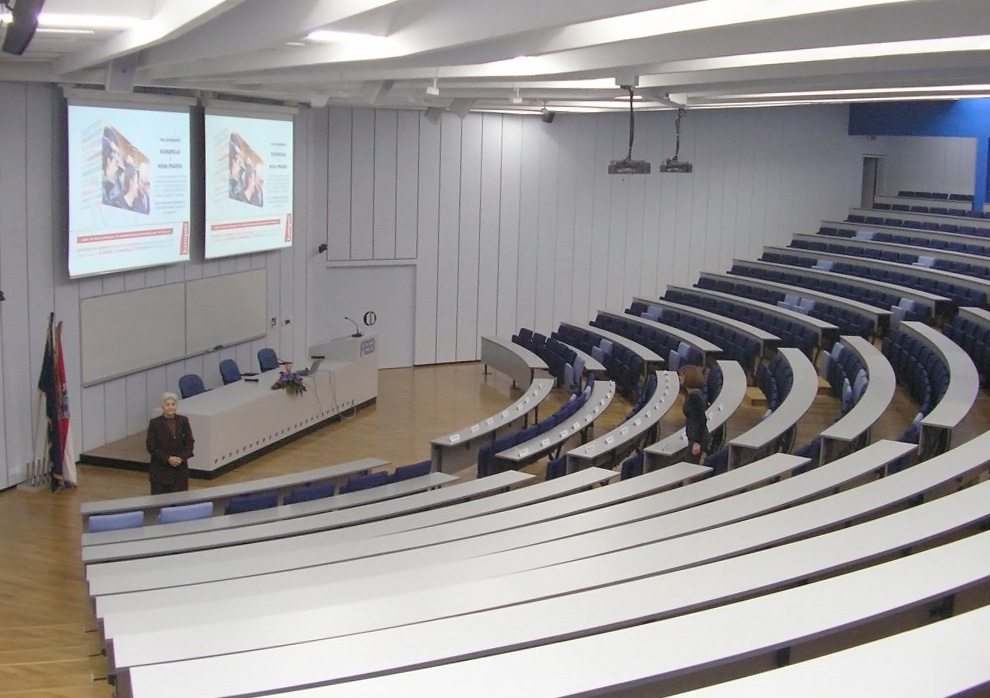
420 seat amphitheatre on FESB

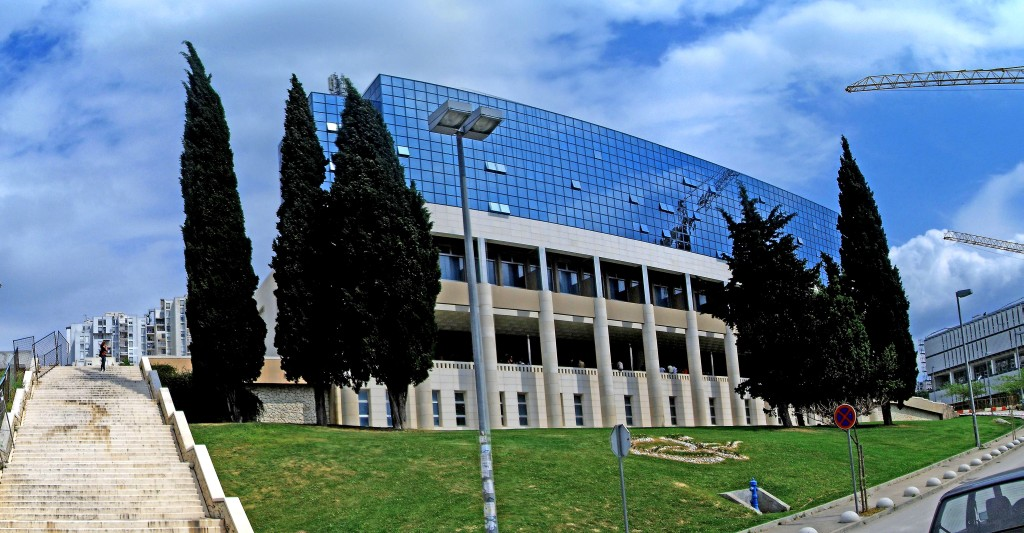
Faculty of Economy

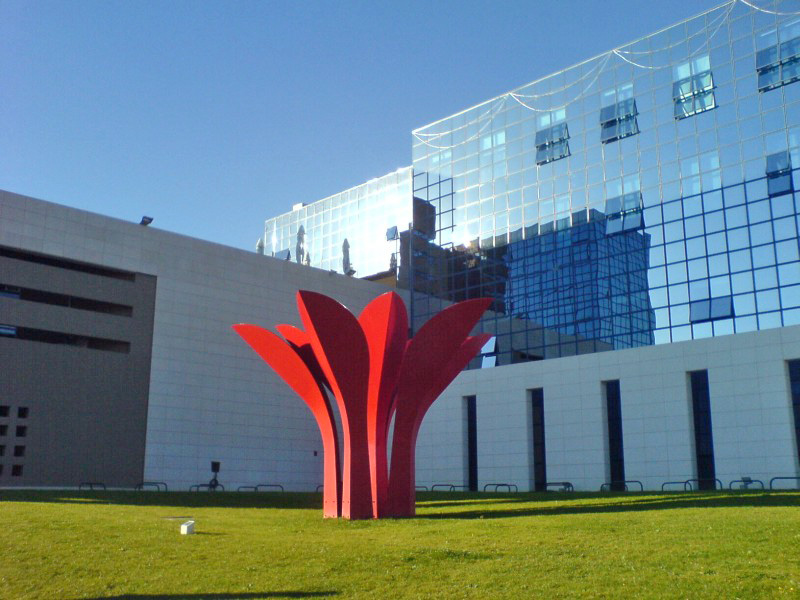
Faculty of Economy, east view

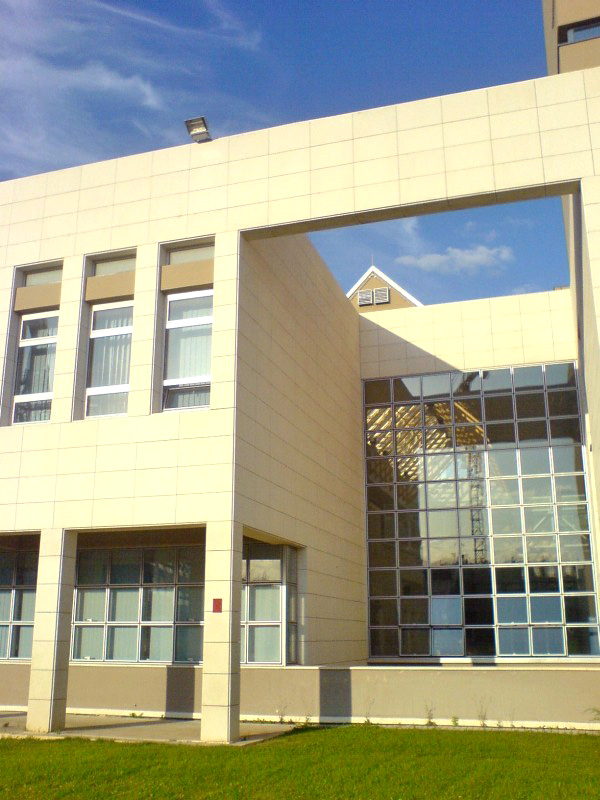
Faculty of Economy, west view

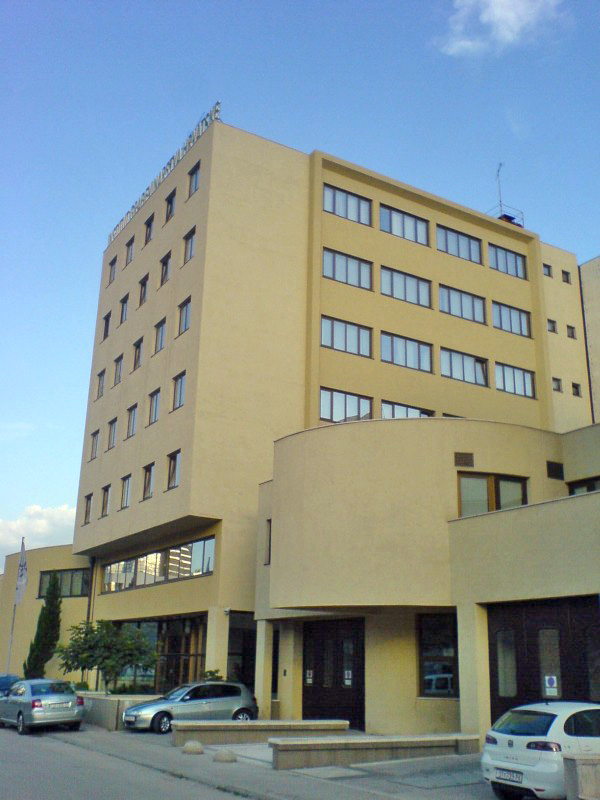
Faculty of Architecture and Civil Engineering

== Events ==
University is the host of the Erasmus Generation Meeting students' conference organized by Erasmus Students Network Split.

== See also ==
- List of universities in Croatia
- Split
- Education in Croatia
