= Kamen, Croatia =

Kamen
- Location within Croatia
- Coordinates: 43°30′50″N 16°30′54″E
- Country: Croatia
- County: Split-Dalmatia County
- Municipality: Split

Area
  - Total: 2.5 km^{2} (0.97 sq mi)

Population (2021)
  - Total: 1,821
  - Density: 730/km^{2} (1,900/sq mi)
- Time zone: UTC+1 (CET)
  - Summer (DST): UTC+2 (CEST)

Kamen is a settlement (naselje) in Split-Dalmatia County, Croatia, administratively part of the city of Split.
