= Žnjan =

Beach in Croatia

- Beach and Kotar
- Location of Žnjan kotar in Split

- Coordinates: 43.501767°N 16.476264°E
- Location: Split, Croatia
- Offshore water bodies: Adriatic Sea

Dimensions
  - Length: 2 km

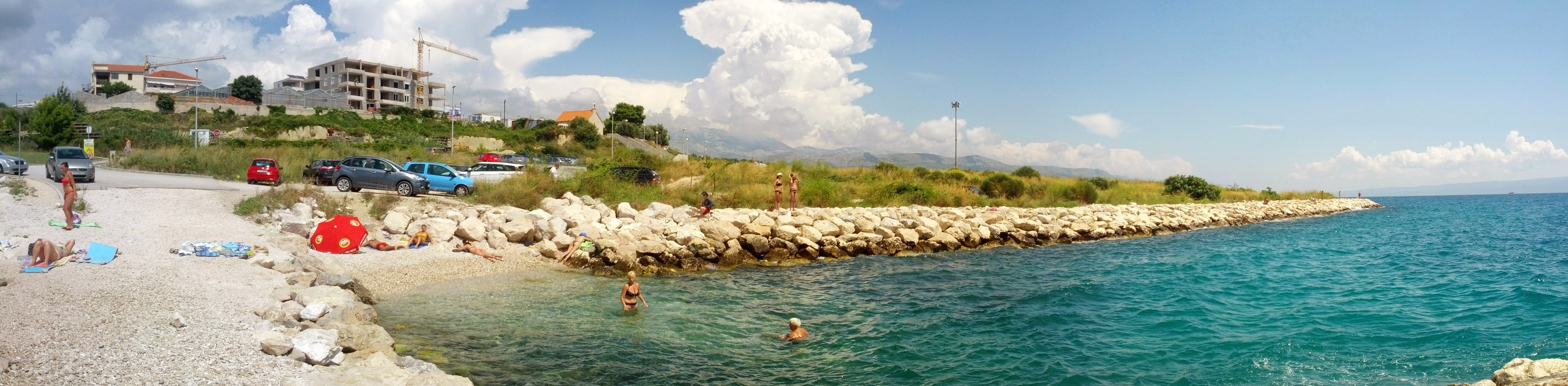
Žnjan

Žnjan is a city kotar and the largest beach in Split, Croatia. It is located in the eastern part of the city. Like most of the Croatian coast, it is mostly a pebble beach. Along the beach, there is a promenade connecting Žnjan with nearby Trstenik beach. It stretches for over 2 kilometres.

== History ==
In 1998, on the occasion of the arrival of pope John Paul II at Žnjan, an artificial plateau was made by pouring tons of earth and stones into the sea. Around half a million people were present at the pope's arrival.

In 2017, the Ministry of Construction announced the removal of illegal structures in Žnjan. The owners of the structures were offered the option of removing the illegal structures themselves, at their own expense, or having the ministry's excavators do it. Most of the owners dismantled their structures themselves.

In December 2022, Mayor of Split Ivica Puljak announced the renovation of Žnjan beach worth 250 million kuna. The renovation officially began on 2 February 2024. In May 2025, part of Žnjan reopened after the first phase of renovation was completed.

On June 21, 2025, Žnjan was officially reopened in a big ceremony. New mayor of Split Tomislav Šuta and the Croatian minister of tourism Tonči Glavina were present at the event.
