= Žrnovnica =

Coordinates: 43°31′16″N 16°33′32″E

- Interactive map of Žrnovnica
- Country: Croatia
- County: Split-Dalmatia County
- Municipality: Split

Area
  - Total: 13.3 km^{2} (5.1 sq mi)

Population (2021)
  - Total: 3,279
  - Density: 247/km^{2} (639/sq mi)
- Time zone: UTC+1 (CET)
  - Summer (DST): UTC+2 (CEST)

Žrnovnica is a settlement (naselje) in Croatia, administratively part of the city of Split. The population is 3,222 (census 2011).
