= Centre (Croatian political party) =

Liberal political party in Croatia

Centre Centar
- President: Marijana Puljak
- Vice presidents: Marin Račić
- Founder: Marijana Puljak
- Founded: 2013 (as Citizens' initiative); 2015 (as Political party)
- Headquarters: Split, Croatia
- Membership (2022): 312
- Ideology: Social liberalism Economic liberalism Pro-Europeanism
- Political position: Centre
- National affiliation: Rivers of Justice (2024)
- Regional affiliation: Liberal South East European Network
- European affiliation: Alliance of Liberals and Democrats for Europe
- Colours: Blue, Magenta; Before 2020: Dark blue, Orange
- Slogan: "Budućnost Hrvatske je biti <centar>" ("The future of Croatia is to be the Centre")
- Sabor: 2 / 151
- European Parliament: 0 / 12
- County Prefects: 0 / 21
- Mayors: 0 / 128
- Split City Council: 11 / 31

Website
- strankacentar.hr

Centre (Croatian: Centar) is a liberal political party in Croatia. The party was formed under the name Pametno (English: Intelligently) in Split in 2015 out of the citizens' initiative Za pametne ljude i pametan grad ("For smart people and a smart city"). The fundamental values endorsed by the party are the promotion of democracy, accountable and transparent management of public resources, civil proactive protection of fundamental human rights, economic development and environmental protection.

Throughout the years, Pametno grew from the local initiative into a national party with representation in the Croatian Parliament. In November 2020, following a merger with Dalija Orešković's Party with a First and Last Name, the party Pametno changed name to the Centre.

== History ==
=== Pametno (until 2020) ===
Pametno logo

Pametno was founded in 2013 as citizens' initiative Za pametne ljude i pametan grad ("For smart people and a smart city") in the second most populous city in Croatia, Split, by computer scientist Marijana Puljak. In 2010, Puljak served as President of the Split City District of Žnjan which had around 6000 citizens. During her tenure, she achieved success by reviving social life in the district, launching the construction of a playground and obtaining a building permit for a new district school. In 2013, she founded the citizens' initiative, competed in the 2013 local elections and eventually, surprisingly, ended up winning 4 seats in the Split City Council.

In 2015, the citizens' initiative was transformed into a political party whose work was based on the principles of 'New people for a new policy', 'Science and education as the foundation of society' and 'Policies based on evidence'.

Pametno participated in the 2015 parliamentary election in the 10th electoral district but did not win any seats in the Parliament. It originally negotiated with the new big-tent party Bridge of Independent Lists ahead of the election, but the parties parted ways because of disagreements and Pametno ran alone. In the 2016 extraordinary parliamentary election, the Party went national as part of the two-party "Turn Croatia Around" coalition, eventually coming in 7th in term of votes won, but winning no seats in the Parliament.

At the 2017 local elections, the Party nominated Marijana Puljak as its candidate for the position of Mayor of Split. She eventually came in third and did not qualify for the second round. However, Pametno won 7 seats in the Split City Council; three more than the party had won at the previous election.

On 1 December 2017, the party was admitted into the Alliance of Liberals and Democrats for Europe as an affiliate member. As of 2024, Centre has achieved full membership status.

=== Centre (since 2020) ===
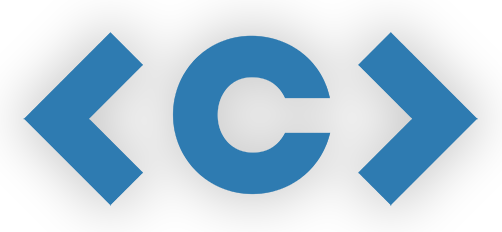
Alternative logo

Pametno participated in the 2020 parliamentary election in a centrist coalition with relatively new parties Focus and Party with a First and Last Name (IP). Marijana Puljak was elected a member of Parliament in the 10th electoral district. After a split with Focus, newly elected MPs Puljak and Dalija Orešković (IP) formed a parliamentary club together with Anka Mrak-Taritaš, the leader of Civic Liberal Alliance (GLAS). The club became the first all-female club in history of Sabor.

In November 2020, Party with a First and Last Name and Pametno announced their merger into one party, called Centre. The announcement was not well received among the Split party members at the time. Many left, including six local councilors and party founders that later founded Smart for Split and Dalmatia. Formally, Pametno changed its name while IP remained as a registered party, with MP Orešković as a member of both parties, because of political funds the party would receive for their elected seat in Sabor. Orešković, Marijana Puljak, Dario Carev and Marin Račić were elected co-presidents of Centre.

At the 2021 local elections, the Party candidate for the position of the Mayor of Split was Ivica Puljak. First round he ended first while in the runoff he beat HDZ candidate Vice Mihanović. The Centre also won 7 out of 31 seats in the council, coming second. Since the 2021 nationwide local elections, the party also has city councilors in Rijeka and Bjelovar, as well as assembly members in Split-Dalmatia County, Sisak-Moslavina County and Zadar County. In the extraordinary elections in June 2022, mayor Ivica Puljak confirmed his mandate, and 15 councilors from the Centre party entered the Split city council.

At the party's online electoral congress in November 2021, mayor Puljak was elected the new leader of the party, with Lana Pavić and Marin Račić as his vice presidents and Dalija Orešković as the political secretary. Orešković however left Centre in August 2023, due to the dispute with Puljak couple and formed Dalija Orešković and People with a First and Last Name on 8 October 2023, as a continuation of Party with a First and Last Name.

The Centre was one of the 11 left-wing and liberal opposition parties that organized the 2024 Zagreb protest. In March 2024, the party became a part of the Rivers of Justice coalition ahead of the 2024 Croatian parliamentary election. The party won two seats, with Marijana Puljak being re-elected and Dubrovnik lawyer Viktorija Knežević replacing newly elected Ivica Puljak who had suspended his mandate to focus on his duties as mayor. Since 2024, the Centre forms a joint deputy club with Independent Platform of the North.

== Ideology ==
Centre's priorities are structural reforms, education and science, and it adheres to the values of "modern Western European countries". The Party is secular, anti-fascist and pro-European. It opposes the Vatican agreements and the use of salute Za dom spremni. It strongly believes in civil liberties, such as the right to abortion and advancement of LGBT rights.

On economy, Centre is liberal. The party supports the free market and encourages entrepreneurship, advocating for reduction of taxes, eliminating parafiscal fees and less public administration and bureaucracy. At the same time, the party takes a social approach to education and healthcare. One of its priorities is decentralization. Centre advocates for reducing the number of municipalities and replacing the current 20 counties of Croatia with 5 regions. Centre also advocates the reduction of the Government of Croatia from 20 to 12 ministries, while also reducing the overall number of civil servants.

== Election results ==
=== Parliament (Sabor) ===
The following is a summary of the party's results in legislative elections for the Croatian Parliament. The "Votes won" and "Percentage" columns include sums of votes won by pre-election coalitions the party had been part of. The "Seats won" column includes sums of seats won by Centre.

Election	Coalition with	Votes won	Percentage	Seats won	Change	Government
Election	Coalition with	(Coalition totals)		(Pametno / Centre only)		Government
2015	—	6,001	0.27%	0 / 151	New	Extra-parliamentary
2016	Za grad	38,812	2.06%	0 / 151	0	Extra-parliamentary
2020	Fokus – IP	66,399	3.98%	1 / 151	▲1	Opposition
2024	SDP–HSS–GLAS–IP	538,748	25.40%	2 / 151	▲1	Opposition

=== European Parliament ===
Election	List leader	Coalition with	Votes	%	Seats	+/–	EP Group
2019	Ivica Puljak	Union of Kvarner	15,074	1.40 (#13)	0 / 12	New	–
2024	Biljana Borzan	SDP–HSS–GLAS–DO i SIP	192,859	25,62 (#2)	0 / 12	0	–

=== Presidential ===
The following is a list of presidential candidates who were endorsed by Centar.

Election year(s)	Candidate	1st round		2nd round		Result
Election year(s)	Candidate	Votes	%	Votes	%	Result
2024	Zoran Milanović (Ind.)	797,938	49.68 (#1)	1,122,859	74.68 (#1)	Won

=== Split local elections ===
==== City Council ====
Election	as	Votes won	Percentage	Seats won	Change	Government
2013	Marijana Puljak Independent List	6,534	9.25%	4 / 35	New	Opposition
2017	Pametno	11,043	16.43%	7 / 35	▲3	Opposition
2021	Centre	12,862	20.17%	7 / 31	Steady	Government
2022	Centre	19,376	42.47%	15 / 31	▲8	Government
2025	Centre	15,888	31.07%	11 / 31	▼4	Opposition

== See also ==
- Liberalism in Croatia
