= Gornje Sitno =

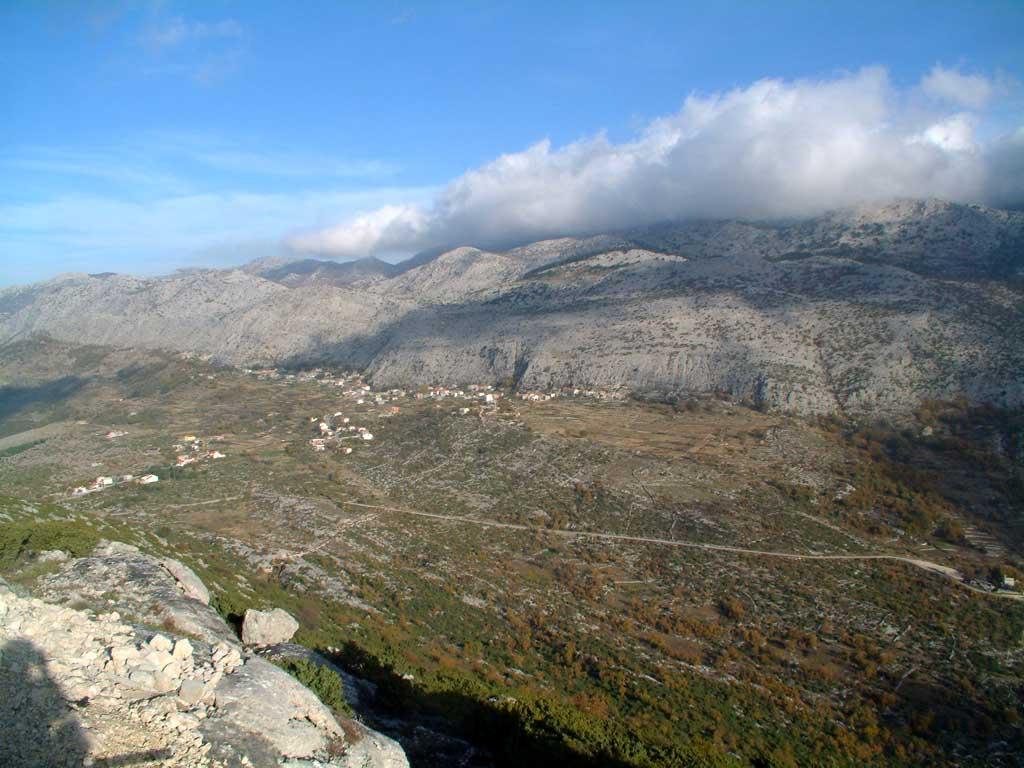
- Gornje Sitno in front of the Mosor mountain

- Location within Croatia
- Coordinates: 43°31′1″N 16°36′37″E
- Country: Croatia
- County: Split-Dalmatia County
- Municipality: Split

Area
  - Total: 14.0 km^{2} (5.4 sq mi)

Population (2021)
  - Total: 356
  - Density: 25.4/km^{2} (65.9/sq mi)
- Time zone: UTC+1 (CET)
  - Summer (DST): UTC+2 (CEST)

Gornje Sitno is a settlement (naselje) in Split-Dalmatia County, Croatia, administratively part of the city of Split. As of 2021, its population was 356 inhabitants.
