= Donje Sitno =

- Interactive map of Donje Sitno
- Location within Croatia
- Coordinates: 43°30′28″N 16°35′44″E
- Country: Croatia
- County: Split-Dalmatia County
- Municipality: Split

Area
  - Total: 4.5 km^{2} (1.7 sq mi)

Population (2021)
  - Total: 289
  - Density: 64/km^{2} (170/sq mi)
- Time zone: UTC+1 (CET)
  - Summer (DST): UTC+2 (CEST)

Donje Sitno is a settlement (naselje) in Split-Dalmatia County, Croatia, administratively part of the city of Split.
