= New Left (Croatia) =

Croatian political party

New Left Nova ljevica
- Leader: Ivana Kekin
- Founder: Dragan Markovina
- Founded: 22 February 2017
- Dissolved: 2025
- Merged into: We Can!
- Headquarters: Zagreb
- Membership (2022): 119
- Ideology: Social democracy Democratic socialism
- Political position: Centre-left to left-wing
- National affiliation: Green–Left Coalition (2017–2024)

Website
- novaljevica.hr

New Left (Croatian: Nova ljevica, NL) was a social-democratic and democratic socialist political party in Croatia. It promoted anti-fascism, environmentalism, and progressivism on social issues.

== History ==
The party was established on 22 February 2017, thanks to the efforts of left-wing intellectuals and civil activists including Dragan Markovina, Zoran Pusić, Vesna Teršelič, Nadežda Čačinovič and Nikola Devčić.

In March 2017, the New Left of Croatia announced their coalition with the left-wing political party Workers' Front for the local elections in Split and Zagreb. They later formed a coalition, for the Zagreb Assembly elections, with We can! (Možemo!), Zagreb is OURS (Zagreb je NAŠ!), Sustainable Development of Croatia - ORaH (Održivi razvoj Hrvatske or ORaH) and For the City (Za grad or ZG). The same parties formed the Green–Left Coalition for the 2020 parliamentary elections.

The party leader and representative Ivana Kekin sat in the Unified European Left Group in the Parliamentary Assembly of the Council of Europe (PACE).

As of 2024, New Left was in the process of merging into Možemo, which was finalized in 2025. The decision to merge and shut down New Left came to the dismay, critique and departure of a number of the party's members.

== Election results ==
=== Parliament of Croatia ===
Year	Popular vote (coalition)	% of popular vote	Seats won (NL only)	Seat change	Coalition	Government
2020	116,480	6.99%	1 / 151	New	Green–Left	Opposition
2024	193,051	9.10%	0 / 151	▼1	Možemo!	Extra-parliamentary

=== Zagreb City Assembly ===
Year	Popular vote (coalition)	% of popular vote	Overall seats won	Seat change	Coalition	Government
2017	24,706	7.64%	1 / 51	▲1	Green–Left	Opposition
2021	130,850	40.83%	3 / 47	▲2	Green–Left	Government

=== European Parliament ===
Year	Popular vote (coalition)	% of popular vote	Overall seats won	Seat change	Coalition	Affiliation
2019	19,313	1.79%	0 / 12	New	Green–Left	EL/GUE-NGL

== See also ==
- Green–Left Coalition
- We Can!
