= 2025 Rijeka local elections =

Elections in Croatia

2025 Rijeka mayoral election
- 18 May 2025; 1 June 2025 (runoff for mayor)
- Mayoral election
- Turnout: 34.85 % (first round) ▼2.75 % 31.94 % (runoff) ▼2.22%
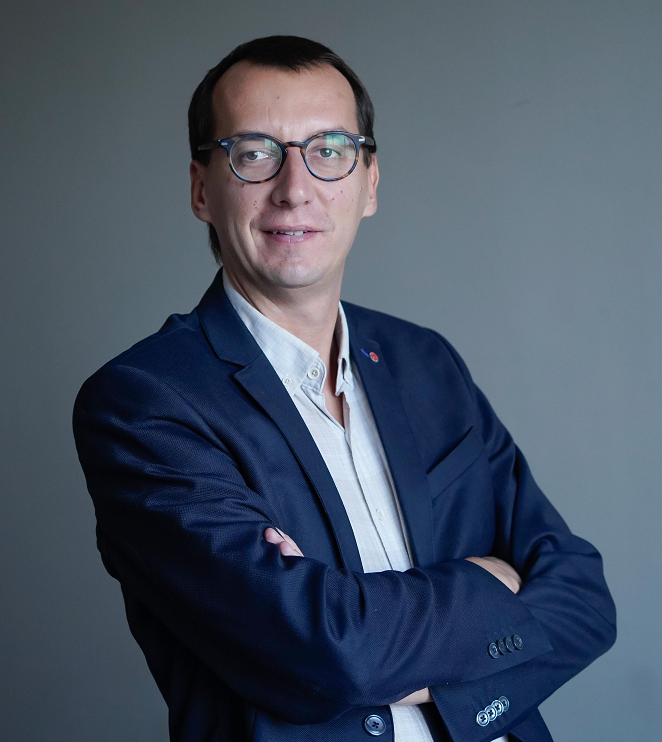
| Candidate | Iva Rinčić | Marko Filipović |
| Party | Independent (AM) | Independent |
| First round | 13,965; 41.07% | 6,421; 18.88% |
| Runoff | 19,787; 63.43% | 10,675; 34.43% |
Mayor before election
Marko Filipović
SDP
Elected mayor
Iva Rinčić
Independent

The 2025 Rijeka local elections were elections for the 16th mayor of Rijeka, the two deputy mayors and the 31 members of the Rijeka City Council. Part of the 2025 Croatian local elections, they were held on 18 May 2025.

== Mayoral election ==
| Candidates | | First round | | Second round | |
| Candidate | Party | Votes | % | Votes | % |
|---|---|---|---|---|---|
| Iva Rinčić | AM, UNIJA, Centre, HSU, Focus | 13,965 | 41.07 | 19,787 | 63.50 |
| Marko Filipović | Independent | 6,421 | 18.88 | 10,675 | 34.43 |
| Sandra Krpan | SDP, PGS, IDS, RI, SDSS, HSS | 5,259 | 15.46 | | |
| Denis Vukorepa | HDZ, HSLS, HDS, HNS | 4,257 | 12.52 | | |
| Nebojša Zelič | Možemo! | 1,872 | 5.50 | | |
| Petra Mandić | Most, DOMiNO, HSP, HS, BUZ | 1,677 | 4.93 | | |
| Valid votes: | | 33,451 | 98.49 | 30,462 | 97.83 |
| Invalid votes: | | 514 | 1.51 | 676 | 2.17 |
| Turnout: | | 33,997 | 34.85 | 31,159 | 31.94 |
| Expected voters: | | 97,542 | | 97,560 | |
The percentages of votes from each candidate are calculated from number of valid voters The percentages of valid and invalid votes are calculated from the turnout number The turnout percentage is calculated from the number of expected voters
Source: City of Rijeka

== City council election ==
| Party list | Previous seats | Votes | % | Seats | % | Seat change |
|---|---|---|---|---|---|---|
| Youth Action; Union of Kvarner; Centre; Croatian Party of Pensioners; Focus; Alternative 101 | 2 / 31 | 11,238 | 33.72 | 11 / 31 | 35.48 | ▲9 |
| Social Democratic Party of Croatia; Alliance of Primorje-Gorski Kotar; Istrian Democratic Assembly; List for Fiume; Independent Democratic Serb Party; Croatian Peasant Party | 13 / 31 | 6,814 | 20.44 | 7 / 31 | 22.58 | ▼6 |
| Croatian Democratic Union; Croatian Social Liberal Party; Croatian Demochristian Party; Croatian People's Party – Liberal Democrats | 6 / 31 | 5,667 | 17.00 | 5 / 31 | 16.13 | ▼1 |
| Independent list of Marko Filipović | 0 / 31 | 3,522 | 10.56 | 3 / 31 | 9.68 | New entry |
| We can! | 2 / 31 | 3,310 | 9.93 | 3 / 31 | 9.68 | ▲1 |
| The Bridge; Home and National Rally; Croatian Party of Rights; Croatian Sovereignists; Pensioners Together Bloc | 4 / 31 | 2.417 | 7.25 | 2 / 31 | 6.45 | ▼2 |
| Public Good | 0 / 31 | 354 | 1.06 | 0 / 31 | 0.00 | New entry |
| Total: | | 33,322 | 98.19 | 31 | | 0 |
| Invalid votes: | | 615 | 1.81 | | | |
| Turnout: | | 33,960 | 34.82 | | | |
| Expected voters: | | 97,543 | | | | |
The percentages of votes from each list are calculated from number of valid voters The percentages of valid and invalid votes are calculated from the turnout number The turnout percentage is calculated from the number of expected voters
Source:https://www.rijeka.hr/rezultati-izbora-za-gradonacelnika-zamjenike-gradonacelnika-i-clanove-gradskog-vijeca-grada-rijeke/

== See also ==
- List of mayors in Croatia
- 2025 Zagreb local elections
- 2025 Split local elections
- 2025 Osijek local elections
