= Timeline of Rijeka =

Coordinates: 45.316667°N 14.416667°E

The following is a timeline of the history of the city of Rijeka, Croatia.

== Prior to 19th century ==
- 3rd century CE – Roman triumphal arch erected.
- 799 CE – Town sacked by forces of Charlemagne (approximate date).
- 1139 – "Counts of Duino" in power.
- 1377 – Church of the Assumption founded.
- 1453 – Virgin Mary pilgrimage church established near town.
- 1471 – Austrians in power.
- 1638 – St. Vitus Cathedral founded.
- 1722 – Fiume becomes a free port.
- 1779 – Town becomes part of the Kingdom of Hungary.
- 1780 – In 1780, Maurice Benyovszky received permission from the emperor to found a society to support the transport of goods along the Karolina road.
- 1790 – Church of St. Nicholas built.

== 19th century ==
- 1809 – Town occupied by French forces.
- 1813 – Town taken by British forces.
- 1822 – Town ceded to Hungary.
- 1849 – Town becomes part of Croatia.
- 1851 - Population: 10,568.
- 1856 – Imperial and Royal Naval Academy moved from Trieste
- 1870 – Town becomes part of the Kingdom of Hungary again.
- 1872 – Drenova becomes part of Fiume.
- 1873 – Railway begins operating.
- 1875 – Whitehead Torpedo Works in operation.
- 1877 – Port built.
- 1890 - Population: 30,337.
- 1891
  - Fiume loses free port status.
  - June: Austrian emperor visits town.
- 1898 – October: Flood.
- 1900 – Population: 38,955.

== 20th century ==
- 1903
  - Rijeka Synagogue built.
  - Seamanship school founded.
- 1906 – February: Labour strike.
- 1913 – Stadio Comunale del Littorio opens.
- 1919 – Town becomes part of the Italian Regency of Carnaro.
- 1920 – Free State of Fiume established per Treaty of Rapallo.
- 1921 – Communist Party of Fiume established.
- 1922 – Town taken by Italian forces.
- 1924
  - 16 March: Fiume becomes part of the Kingdom of Italy per Treaty of Rome.
  - Town becomes capital of Fiume province.
- 1925 - Catholic diocese of Rijeka established.
- 1926 – Unione Sportiva Fiumana football club formed.
- 1945 – Yugoslavs in power.
- 1946 – NK Kvarner football club active.
- 1947 – Fiume becomes part of Yugoslavia per treaty.
- 1948 – Kvarnersko Brodogradilište shipyard active.
- 1949 – City becomes seat of the Rijeka Oblast of Yugoslavia.
- 1953 – Kvarnerska Rivijera football tournament begins.
- 1961 - Population: 100,989.
- 1970 – Rijeka Airport opens.
- 1973
  - University of Rijeka established.
  - Dvorana Mladosti (sport venue) opens in Trsat.
- 1978 – Automotodrom Grobnik opens.
- 1991
  - City becomes part of Croatia.
  - Population: 167,964 city; metro 236,028.
- 1993 - Slavko Linić becomes mayor.
- 1998 – Polytechnic of Rijeka founded.
- 2000
  - Luka Rijeka company established.
  - Vojko Obersnel becomes mayor.

== 21st century ==
- 2011 – Population: 128,624; metro 213,666.
- 2017 - Rijeka local elections, 2017 held.

== See also ==
- History of Rijeka
- Other names of Rijeka
- List of governors and heads of state of Fiume
- List of mayors of Rijeka, 1948–present
- Timeline of Croatian history
- Timelines of other cities in Croatia: Split, Zagreb

== Bibliography ==
=== Published in 19th century ===
- David Brewster, ed. (1830). "Fiume". Edinburgh Encyclopaedia. Edinburgh: William Blackwood.
- "Fiume", Enciclopedia italiana e dizionario della conversazione (in Italian), vol. 7, Venezia: Girolamo Tasso, 1843
- Charles Knight, ed. (1866). "Fiume". Geography. English Cyclopaedia. Vol. 2. London: Bradbury, Evans, & Co. hdl:2027/nyp.33433000064794.
- George Henry Townsend (1867), "Fiume", Manual of Dates (2nd ed.), London: Frederick Warne & Co.
- George L. Faber (9 November 1877), "Fiume and her New Port", Journal of the Society of Arts, vol. 25, London, pp. 56 v, hdl:2027/uc1.b2876384
- Great Britain. Foreign Office (1880). "Austria-Hungary: Fiume". Reports from Her Majesty's Consuls on the Manufactures, Commerce, &c. of Their Consular Districts. London: Harrison and Sons.
- Thomas Graham Jackson (1887), "Fiume", Dalmatia, Oxford: Clarendon Press
- R. Lambert Playfair (1892), "Fiume", Handbook to the Mediterranean (3rd ed.), London: J. Murray
- Norddeutscher Lloyd (1896), "Fiume", Guide through Germany, Austria-Hungary, Italy, Switzerland, France, Belgium, Holland and England, Berlin: J. Reichmann & Cantor, OCLC 8395555

=== Published in 20th century ===
- "Fiume", Chambers's Encyclopaedia, London: W. & R. Chambers, 1901
- "Fiume". Illustrierter Führer durch Dalmatien [Illustrated Guide to Dalmatia] (in German) (5th ed.). Wien: A. Hartleben. 1902.
- "Fiume" . Encyclopædia Britannica. Vol. 10 (11th ed.). 1910. pp. 449–450.
- Benjamin Vincent (1910), "Fiume", Haydn's Dictionary of Dates (25th ed.), London: Ward, Lock & Co.
- "Fiume", Austria-Hungary (11th ed.), Leipzig: Karl Baedeker, 1911
- Mitrović, Pero; F. Barbalić, Radojica (1953). "Riječka luka". Rijeka, zbornik: geografija, etnologija, ekonomija, saobraćaj, povijest, kultura (PDF) (in Croatian). Zagreb: Matica hrvatska. pp. 35–66. Archived from the original (PDF) on 1 March 2023.
- Despot, Miroslava (1953). "Historijat trgovačkih putova između Rijeke i zaleđa u XVIII. i XIX. stoljeću". Rijeka, zbornik: geografija, etnologija, ekonomija, saobraćaj, povijest, kultura (PDF) (in Croatian). Zagreb: Matica hrvatska. pp. 123–136. Archived from the original (PDF) on 1 March 2023.
- Marjanović, Milan (1953). "Rijeka od 1860. do 1918.". Rijeka, zbornik: geografija, etnologija, ekonomija, saobraćaj, povijest, kultura (PDF) (in Croatian). Zagreb: Matica hrvatska. pp. 215–252. Archived from the original (PDF) on 1 March 2023.
- Antić, Vinko (1953). "Sušak—Rijeka i okolica u Narodnooslobodilačkoj borbi". Rijeka, zbornik: geografija, etnologija, ekonomija, saobraćaj, povijest, kultura (PDF) (in Croatian). Zagreb: Matica hrvatska. pp. 349–390. Archived from the original (PDF) on 1 March 2023.
- Antić, Vinko (1953). "Rijeka u Hrvatskoj književnosti XIX. i početkom XX. stoljeća". Rijeka, zbornik: geografija, etnologija, ekonomija, saobraćaj, povijest, kultura (PDF) (in Croatian). Zagreb: Matica hrvatska. pp. 479–514. Archived from the original (PDF) on 1 March 2023.
- Čulinović, Ferdo (1953). "Rijeka u državnopravnom pogledu". Rijeka, zbornik: geografija, etnologija, ekonomija, saobraćaj, povijest, kultura (PDF) (in Croatian). Zagreb: Matica hrvatska. pp. 253–276. Archived from the original (PDF) on 1 March 2023.
- Korlević, Milivoj (1953). Rijeka, zbornik: geografija, etnologija, ekonomija, saobraćaj, povijest, kultura (PDF) (in Croatian). Zagreb: Nešto o Državnom arhivu u Rijeci. pp. 555–560. Archived from the original (PDF) on 1 March 2023.
