= 2025 Croatian local elections =

- 18 May and 1 June 2025
Party	HDZ	SDP	Independent
Prefects	14	3	2
Prefects +/-	▲1	▲1	▼1
Party	We Can!	NPS	IDS
Prefects	1	1	0
Prefects +/-	Steady	Steady	▼1
- Elected county prefects in each county of Croatia; HDZ SDP We Can! NPS Independent

Local elections were held in Croatia on 18 May 2025, with a second round on 1 June. All seats of the county prefects, mayors and municipality heads and members of county, municipal and city councils were up for election. Additional elections for national minorities representatives were held on 5 October of the same year.

== Election system ==
Croatia's county prefects, mayors and municipality heads are elected to four-year terms by a majority of votes cast within applicable local government units, with a runoff election if no candidate achieves a majority in the first round of voting. Members of county, city and municipal councils are elected to four-year terms through proportional representation, with the entire local government unit as a single constituency. The number of council members is defined by the councils themselves, based on applicable legislation. Electoral committees are tasked with determining whether the national minorities are represented in the council (as required by the constitution), adding further members to the council (who belong to the appropriate minorities) by selecting them from unelected-candidate lists. Election silence, as in all other elections in Croatia, is enforced on the day of the elections and the previous day, ending at 7:00 pm when the polling stations close and exit polls may be announced.

Number of seats in each county, city or municipality is defined by the Law on Local and Regional Self-Government and depends on their population.

Population of the county	Seats
with more than 300,000 inhabitants	47
between 200,000 and 300,000 inhabitants	41
between 100,000 and 200,000 inhabitants	37
between 60,000 and 100,000 inhabitants	31
up to 60,000 inhabitants	27

Population of the cities and municipalities	Seats
with more than 300,000 inhabitants	47
between 200,000 and 300,000 inhabitants	41
between 100,000 and 200,000 inhabitants	31
between 60,000 and 100,000 inhabitants	27
between 35,000 and 60,000 inhabitants	21
between 20,000 and 35,000 inhabitants	19
between 10,000 and 20,000 inhabitants	15
between 2,500 and 10,000 inhabitants	13
between 1,000 and 2,500 inhabitants	9
up to 1,000 inhabitants	7

== Election results ==
Results of the election, showing elected municipal and city mayors

In some counties the elections for the first round needed to be repeated at six polling stations

=== Counties ===
The results of the 2025 elections in Croatian counties
County	County Council		Prefect		
County	Plurality	Turnout	Prefect	Turnout	Note
Bjelovar-Bilogora	HDZ, DHSS, HSU (45.05%)	43.28%	Marko Marušić, HDZ (56.77%)	43.36%	first round win
Brod-Posavina	HDZ, HSU (42.74%)	41.79%	Danijel Marušić, HDZ (64.20%)	25.47%	runoff election
Dubrovnik-Neretva	HDZ, HSS, HSLS, HSU, HS, DP, HSP AS (46.22%)	53.06%	Blaž Pezo, HDZ (64.20%)	38.58%	runoff election
Istria	IDS, ISU - PIP, HSLS, HSU, REPUBLIKA (30.41%)	46.28%	Boris Miletić, Ind. (50.44%)	30.50%	runoff election
Karlovac	HDZ (46.16%)	46.59%	Martina Furdek-Hajdin, HDZ (54.85%)	46.60%	first round win
Koprivnica-Križevci	SDP, HSS, HSLS (31.72%)	47.08%	Tomislav Golubić, SDP (55.18%)	35.29%	runoff election
Krapina-Zagorje	SDP, HSS, NS-R (54.00%)	50.36%	Željko Kolar, SDP (63.71%)	50.42%	first round win
Lika-Senj	HDZ, HSS, HSU, HBS (45.97%)	56.11%	Ernest Petry, HDZ (65.23%)	41.36%	runoff election
Međimurje	NPS, HSU, HSLS, DO i SIP, HSS, SU	39.73%	Matija Posavec, NPS (82.34%)	39.82%	first round win
Osijek-Baranja	HDZ, DP, DESNO, HSLS (54.01%)	40.40%	Nataša Tramišak, HDZ (55.49%)	40.46%	first round win
Požega-Slavonia	HDZ, HSU (53.73%)	41.04%	Antonija Jozić, HDZ (53.73%)	41.15%	first round win
Primorje-Gorski Kotar	SDP, PGS, IDS, HSS, RI (34.41%)	40.26%	Ivica Lukanović, SDP (53.49%)	29.72%	runoff election
Sisak-Moslavina	HDZ, HSU, HSLS, HPSS, HNS, HSP AS (56.48%)	45.77%	Ivan Celjak, HDZ (67.44%)	45.84%	first round win
Split-Dalmatia	HDZ, DP, HSP AS (39.82%)	42.83%	Blaženko Boban, HDZ (58.97%)	33.06%	runoff election
Šibenik-Knin	HDZ, HSS, HDS, DP (42.12%)	43.26%	Paško Rakić, HDZ (58.90%)	30.67%	runoff election
Varaždin	HDZ, HSLS, SUS (36.40%)	46.25%	Anđelko Stričak, HDZ (50.10%)	35.75%	runoff election
Virovitica-Podravina	HDZ, HSU, HSLS (62.04%)	43.81%	Igor Andrović, HDZ (72.13%)	43.86%	first round win
Vukovar-Srijem	HDZ, DP, DHSS, HSU, HSLS, DESNO (47.08%)	45.09%	Ivan Bosančić, HDZ (61.43%)	26.12%	runoff election
Zadar	HDZ, HDS, HSP AS, HSU, NS-R, SU, UZ (47.09%)	42.73%	Josip Bilaver, HDZ (66.39%)	27.14%	runoff election
Zagreb	HDZ, HSU, DP (28.33%)	40.79%	Stjepan Kožić, Ind. (53.13%)	21.42%	runoff election
City of Zagreb	MOŽEMO!, SDP (43.66%)	42.65%	Tomislav Tomašević, M! (57.56%)	34.67%	runoff election
Source: State Electoral Committee

=== Cities ===
The results of the 2025 elections in Croatian cities
City	City Council		Mayor		
City	Plurality	Turnout	Mayor	Turnout	Note
Bakar	HDZ (60.12%)	42.10%	Tomislav Klarić, HDZ (66.01%)	42.12%	first round win
Beli Manastir	HDZ, HSU, DP (46.67%)	39.01%	Igor Pavelić, HDZ (58.25%)	37.77%	runoff election
Belišće	Independent list of Ivana Jerbić (46.18%)	54.17%	Ivana Jerbić, Ind. (80.55%)	47.79%	runoff election
Benkovac	HDZ (47.97%)	29.39%	Tomislav Bulić, HDZ (56.75%)	29.34%	first round win
Biograd na Moru	HDZ (54.49%)	45.27%	Ivan Knez, HDZ (68.76%)	45.29%	first round win
Bjelovar	HSLS, HSS (48.52%)	36.57%	Dario Hrebak, HSLS (81.13%)	36.67%	first round win
Buje	IDS, SDP (70.86%)	37.20%	Fabrizio Vižintin, IDS (72.03%)	37.20%	first round win
Buzet	Independent list of Damir Karin (44.67%)	53.99%	Damir Kajin, Ind. (65.34%)	46.68%	runoff election
Cres	SDP, PGS, IDS, HSS (51.43%)	55.34%	Marin Gregorović, SDP (57.18%)	55.34%	first round win
Crikvenica	HDZ, HSP, HSLS, UNIJA (41.76%)	41.10%	Ivona Matošić Gašparović, HDZ (59.67%)	41.10%	first round win
Čabar	Independent list of Antonio Dražović (44.00%)	56.54%	Antonio Dražović, Ind. (50.32%)	56.57%	first round win
Čakovec	NPS, HSLS, HSU (45.88%)	40.68%	Ljerka Cividini, NPS (60.52%)	40.69%	first round win
Čazma	Independent list of Dinko Pirak (27.70%)	42.62%	Valentina Čanađija, HSLS (57.21%)	46.96%	runoff election
Daruvar	HDZ, HSU, DHSS (46.18%)	42.52%	Damir Lneniček, HDZ (75.76%)	42.51%	first round win
Delnice	SDP (44.66%)	47.40%	Igor Pleše, SDP (65.84%)	47.40%	first round win
Donja Stubica	Independent list of Nikola Gospočić (70.51%)	44.68%	Nikola Gospočić, Ind. (84.82%)	44.71%	first round win
Donji Miholjac	HDZ (43.84%)	44.40%	Dražen Trcović, HDZ (68.01%)	39.19%	runoff election
Drniš	HDZ (58.18%)	45.57%	Tomislav Dželalija, HDZ (66.04%)	45.62%	first round win
Dubrovnik	HDZ, HSU, HS (32.48%)	47.01%	Mato Franković, HDZ (65.16%)	35.15%	runoff election
Duga Resa	Independent list of Tomislav Boljar (46.79%)	42.26%	Tomislav Boljar, Ind. (86.33%)	42.26%	first round win
Dugo Selo	Independent list of Nenad Painan (42.15%)	31.54%	Nenad Painan, Ind. (59.67%)	27.44%	runoff election
Đakovo	HDZ (34.50%)	41.51%	Marin Mandarić, HDZ (50.04%)	47.18%	runoff election
Đurđevac	Independent list (77.30%)	48.25%	Hrvoje Janči, Ind. (78.58%)	48.38%	first round win
Garešnica	HDZ, HSLS, HSP (70.79%)	32.77%	Josip Bilandžija, HDZ (100.00%)	32.76%	only candidate
Glina	Ind. (42.96%)	48.58%	Ivan Janković, Ind. (69.98%)	48.64%	first round win
Gospić	LiPO (44.86%)	54.29%	Darko Milinović, LiPO (53.24%)	54.29%	first round win
Grubišno Polje	HDZ (75.48%)	45.56%	Zlatko Pavičić, HDZ (78.96%)	46.12%	first round win
Hrvatska Kostajnica	HDZ (78.55%)	37.54%	Dalibor Bišćan, HDZ (100.00%)	37.70%	only candidate
Hvar	HDZ (27.38%)	55.37%	Šime Ravlić, HDZ (61.90%)	43.97%)	runoff election
Ilok	HDZ (48.14%)	45.45%	Renata Banožić, HDZ (51.35%)	45.45%	first round win
Imotski	HDZ (53.68%)	39.26%	Luka Kolovrat, HDZ (67.77%)	39.29%	first round win
Ivanec	NPS (39.95%)	44.54%	Milorad Batinić, NPS (54.30%)	46.03%	runoff election
Ivanić-Grad	HDZ, HSLS, HNS, SU, SKNL (48.61%)	42.38%	Javor Bojan Leš, HDZ (54.55%)	42.44%	first round win
Jastrebarsko	SDP, HSU (54.53%)	45.19%	Zvonimir Novosel, SDP (60.68%)	45.19%	first round win
Karlovac	HDZ (37.25%)	40.74%	Damir Mandić, HDZ (53.47%)	37.37%	runoff election
Kastav	SDP, PGS, IDS, HSU, HSS (60.94%)	35.51%	Matej Mostarac, SDP (76.07%)	35.51%	first round win
Kaštela	HDZ (53.24%)	29.24%	Denis Ivanović, HDZ (66.34%)	29.25%	first round win
Klanjec	SDP (42.26%)	49.44%	Zlatko Brlek, SDP (57.48%)	39.05%	runoff election
Knin	Independent list of Marijo Ćaćić (37.69%)	42.69%	Marijo Ćaćić, Ind. (60.40%)	35.03%	runoff election
Komiža	SDP, HNS (45.71%)	49.87%	Ivica Vitaljić, Ind. (53.07%)	57.12%	runoff election
Koprivnica	SDP, HSS, HSLS (68.41%)	37.92%	Mišel Jakšić, SDP (71.06%)	37.94%	first round win
Korčula	HDZ, HSS, HSP AS, HSU (48.84%)	61.57%	Franjo Jeričević, HDZ (50.06%)	67.06%	runoff election
Kraljevica	HDZ, HSU (65.44%)	38.77%	Dalibor Čandrlić, HDZ (100.00%)	38.77%	only candidate
Krapina	HDZ, ZS, ZDS, DHSS, HSU (56.09%)	46.34%	Zoran Gregurović, HDZ (63.45%)	46.35%	first round win
Križevci	Independent list of Tomislav Katanović (26.33%)	46.11%	Tomislav Katanović, Ind. (60.87%)	47.98%	runoff election
Krk	PGS, SDP (39.72%)	38.33%	Darijo Vasilić, PGS (87.41%)	38.33%	first round win
Kutina	SDP (26.90%)	46.00%	Zlatko Babić, Ind. (51.28%)	43.39%	runoff election
Kutjevo	HDZ, HSU (78.50%)	29.29%	Josip Budimir, HDZ (100.00%)	29.29%	only candidate
Labin	Ind. (47.24%)	50.93%	Donald Blašković, Ind. (52.69%)	50.97%	first round win
Lepoglava	HSS, NPS, NS-R (30.33%)	46.39%	Željko Šoštarić, HSS (60.01%)	52.48%	runoff election
Lipik	HDZ (65.30%)	33.28%	Vinko Kasana, HDZ (100.00%)	33.28%	only candidate
Ludbreg	NPS, SDP, HSS (41.53%)	47.68%	Dubravko Bilić, NPS (51.35%)	54.91%	runoff election
Makarska	SDP (45.43%)	44.0%	Zoran Paunović, SDP (60.09%)	38.34%	runoff election
Mali Lošinj	HDZ, HSS (30.37%)	54.68%	Ana Kučić, HDZ (56.43%)	51.18%	runoff election
Metković	HDZ, HSLS, HSU (52.21%)	55.95%	Dalibor Milan, HDZ (54.94%)	55.93%	first round win
Mursko Središće	HDZ, HDS, HSLS (54.41%)	37.49%	Dražen Srpak, HDZ (67.42%)	37.51%	first round win
Našice	HDZ (48.11%)	49.88%	Krešimir Kašuba, HDZ (57.01%)	51.34%	runoff election
Nin	HDZ (52.09%)	46.87%	Emil Ćurko, HDZ (53.61%)	46.91%	first round win
Nova Gradiška	Independent list of Vinko Grgić (53.87%)	40.93%	Vinko Grgić, Ind. (58.55%)	40.96%	first round win
Novalja	HDZ, HSS (55.25%)	70.21%	Ivan Dabo, HDZ (57.09%)	70.21%	first round win
Novi Marof	HDZ, HNS, HSS Braće Radić, SUS (60.52%)	43.44%	Siniša Jenkač, HDZ (67.09%)	43.50%	first round win
Novi Vinodolski	HDZ (74.63%)	49.89%	Tomislav Cvitković, HDZ (78.78%)	49.87%	first round win
Novigrad	IDS, HSU (67.25%)	42.01%	Anteo Milos, IDS (73.53%)	42.01%	first round win
Novska	HDZ, HPSS, HSU (63.62%)	36.36%	Marija Kušmiš, HDZ (69.84%)	36.63%	first round win
Obrovac	HDZ (49.31%)	42.55%	Ante Župan, HDZ (64.44%)	42.53%	first round win
Ogulin	SDP (44.12%)	56.59%	Dalibor Domitrović, SDP (59.59%)	56.61%	first round win
Omiš	HDZ, DP (28.64%)	41.74%	Zvonko Močić, Ind. (59.08%)	37.42%	runoff election
Opatija	SDP (44.57%)	42.88%	Fernando Kirgin, SDP (55.51%)	42.92%	first round win
Opuzen	HDZ, HSLS, HNS (38.32%)	65.01%	Ivan Mataga, Ind. (58.68%)	66.39%	runoff election
Orahovica	SDP (37.48%)	54.60%	Milan Babac, SDP (53.61%)	59.85%	runoff election
Oroslavje	Independent list of Viktor Šimunić (71.76%)	52.77%	Viktor Šimunić, Ind. (75.89%)	52.88%	first round win
Osijek	HDZ, HSLS, HNS, NL Ante Đapić, NL Tomislav Mišetić (58.76%)	33.32%	Ivan Radić, HDZ (70.95%)	33.42%	first round win
Otočac	Independent list of Lidija Pernar (36.00%)	55.65%	Goran Bukovac, Ind. (50.08%)	62.30%	runoff election
Otok	DP (55.04%)	52.40%	Slavko Grgić, DP (60.37%)	52.93%	first round win
Ozalj	Independent list of Lidija Bošnjak(37.85%)	49.55%	Lidija Bošnjak, Ind. (70.48%)	49.57%	first round win
Pag	HDS, HDZ (35.78%)	69.40%	Stipe Žunić, NLM (57.92%)	74.14%	runoff election
Pakrac	HDZ (54.41%)	38.35%	Tomislav Nominc, HDZ (55.27%)	38.38%	first round win
Pazin	Možemo!, SDP (43.93%)	47.69%	Suzana Jašić, M! (67.70%)	43.48%	runoff election
Petrinja	HDZ (53.42%)	36.62%	Magdalena Komes, HDZ (57.23%)	36.68%	first round win
Pleternica	HDZ (64.97%)	45.69%	Marija Šarić, HDZ (53.48%)	72.93%	first round win
Ploče	SDP (49.85%)	61.53%	Ivan Marević, SDP (50.36%)	61.55%	first round win
Popovača	HDZ, HSU (36.26%)	54.37%	Josip Mišković, HSP (50.67%)	55.79%	runoff election
Poreč	IDS, ISU - PIP (65.42%)	40.84%	Loris Peršurić, IDS (76.19%)	40.84%	first round win
Požega	HDZ, HSU (40.42%)	40.45%	Borislav Miličević, HDZ (53.48%)	36.21%	runoff election
Pregrada	SDP, HSS (48.03%)	52.59%	Goran Vukmanić, HDZ (55.40%)	60.04%	runoff election
Prelog	HDZ, HSS (48.65%)	51.20%	Ljubomir Kolarek, HDZ (56.15%)	51.27%	first round win
Pula	IDS, ISU - PIP (20.35%)	40.85%	Peđa Grbin, SDP (53.23%)	37.98%	runoff election
Rab	HDZ, RPS, HSS, HSU (42.46%)	56.97%	Nikola Grgurić, HDZ (57.55%)	52.27%	runoff election
Rijeka	AM, Unija, Centar, HSU, Fokus (33.72%)	34.82%	Iva Rinčić, Ind. (64.96%)	31.94%	runoff election
Rovinj	IDS, HSLS, REPUBLIKA, HSU (46.10%)	41.13%	Emil Nimčević, IDS (52.95%)	41.18%	first round win
Samobor	Fokus (55.83%)	50.11%	Petra Škrobot, Fokus (59.97%)	50.20%	first round win
Senj	HDZ, HBS, HSS (65.29%)	54.72%	Željko Tomljanović, HDZ (66.75%)	54.91%	first round win
Sinj	Most (33.79%)	49.15%	Miro Bulj, Most (50.29%)	51.24%	runoff election
Sisak	HDZ, HSU, HSLS, HSP AS (52.67%)	50.53%	Domagoj Orlić, HDZ (58.03%)	50.58%	first round win
Skradin	HDZ (59.57%)	31.05%	Antonijo Brajković, HDZ (100.00%)	31.00%	only candidate
Slatina	HDZ, HSLS (39.61%)	39.97%	Tomo Tomić. HDZ (53.49%)	37.98%	runoff election
Slavonski Brod	Independent list of Mirko Duspara (40.56%)	35.81%	Mirko Duspara, Ind. (60.68%)	30.41%	runoff election
Slunj	HDZ (62.76%)	38.66%	Mirjana Puškarić, HDZ (100.00%)	38.81%	only candidate
Solin	HDZ, BS, HSU (55.68%)	36.00%	Dalibor Ninčević, HDZ (66.88%)	62.98%	first round win
Split	Centar (31.07%)	37.30%	Tomislav Šuta, HDZ (53.19%)	42.20%	runoff election
Stari Grad	HDZ (45.32%)	53.33%	Vinko Vranjican, HDZ (66.88%)	53.33%	first round win
Supetar	SDP, HSU (47.33%)	49.45%	Ivana Marković, SDP (60.96%)	49.45%	first round win
Sveta Nedelja	Ind. (63.94%)	39.88%	Dario Zurovec, Ind. (69.86%)	39.88%	first round win
Sveti Ivan Zelina	HDZ (35.99%)	39.10%	Eva Jendriš Škrljak, HDZ (52.04%)	44.03%	runoff election
Šibenik	HDZ, HDS, DP (41.57%)	37.38%	Željko Burić, HDZ (64.02%)	32.91%	runoff election
Trilj	HDZ (63.26%)	53.11%	Ivan Bugarin, HDZ (63.64%)	53.12%	first round win
Trogir	SDP, HNS, HSU (57.74%)	46.86%	Ante Bilić, SDP (60.96%)	46.87%	first round win
Umag	SDP, HSU, HNS (45.83%)	40.10%	Vili Bassanese, SDP (57.27%)	40.12%	first round win
Valpovo	Ind. (66.27%)	46.25%	Matko Šutalo, Ind. (75.16%)	46.66%	first round win
Varaždin	SDP (56.82%)	39.27%	Neven Bosilj, SDP (65.25%)	39.33%	first round win
Varaždinske Toplice	HSLS, HDZ, SUS (47.02%)	51.95%	Dragica Ratković, HDZ (52.68%)	52.01%	first round win
Velika Gorica	HDZ, HSU, HSLS, HSS, SKNL, BM365 (52.67%)	37.12%	Krešimir Ačkar, HDZ (72.55%)	37.24%	first round win
Vinkovci	HDZ, HSU, DP, HSLS (54.37%)	37.81%	Josip Romić, HDZ (55.63%)	37.87%	first round win
Virovitica	HDZ, HSLS (57.66%)	43.36%	Ivica Kirin, HDZ (57.64%)	43.55%	first round win
Vis	Independent list of Hrvoje Mratinić (43.03%)	54.51%	Hrvoje Mratinić, Ind. (51.34%)	54.51%	first round win
Vodice	HDZ, HSS (55.07%)	38.94%	Ante Cukrov, HDZ (63.48%)	38.93%	first round win
Vodnjan	IDS, ISU - PIP (54.74%)	47.21%	Igor Orlić, IDS (58.86%)	47.60%	first round win
Vrbovec	SDP, HSS (57.85%)	43.48%	Denis Kralj, SDP (67.04%)	43.99%	first round win
Vrbovsko	SDP (29.83%)	50.64%	Dražen Mufić, Ind. (51.20%)	58.75&	runoff election
Vrgorac	HDZ (41.52%)	61.91%	Mile Herceg, NLM (58.74%)	70.86%	runoff election
Vrlika	HDZ (52.28%)	55.98%	Jure Plazonić, HDZ (57.84%)	56.09%	runoff election
Vukovar	DP, HDZ, HNS, HSU (38.58%)	39.57%	Marijan Pavliček, HS (51.14%)	39.09%	runoff election
Zabok	SDP, HSS (44.22%)	54.88%	Valentina Đurek, SDP (50.20%)	52.73%	runoff election
Zadar	HDZ, HDS, HSP AS, HSU, NS-R, SU, UZ (37.59%)	37.12%	Šime Erlić, HDZ (59.35%)	28.87%	runoff election
Zaprešić	HDZ, HSU (37.75%)	36.90%	Željko Turk, HDZ (50.26%)	36.93%	first round win
Zlatar	SDP, NS-R (65.82%)	41.52%	Jasenka Auguštan-Pentek, SDP (67.15%)	41.52%	first round win
Županja	Independent list of Damir Juzbašić (57.84%)	43.87%	Damir Juzbašić, Ind. (63.95%)	43.85%	first round win
Source: State Electoral Committee

Mayors by political party
Party	2021	2025	Change
HDZ	56	61	▲5
Independent	28	26	▼2
SDP	22	19	▼3
IDS	5	5	0
NPS	0	3	▲3
Možemo!	2	2	0
HSLS	1	2	▲1
NLM	1	2	▲1
HSS	1	1	0
PGS	1	1	0
Most	1	1	0
DP	1	1	0
HS	0	1	▲1
LiPO	0	1	▲1
HSP	2	1	▼1
Focus	3	1	▼2
Centar	1	0	▼1
ŽZ	1	0	▼1
HNS-LD	2	0	▼2
Total	128	128	

== Elections in major cities ==
- 2025 Zagreb local elections
- 2025 Split local elections
- 2025 Rijeka local elections
- 2025 Osijek local elections

== Analysis ==
HDZ increased its number of county governors from 13 to 14 and its number of city mayors from 56 to 61. The party also increased its number of city and municipal mayors in Istria County and Primorje-Gorski Kotar County, traditional strongholds of IDS and SDP.

As expected, Tomislav Tomašević (Možemo) was re-elected as mayor of Zagreb, defeating the independent candidate Marija Selak-Raspudić.

In Split HDZ’s candidate Tomislav Šuta defeated the incumbent mayor Ivica Puljak, who subsequently announced that he was retiring from active politics.

Rijeka, Croatia's third most populous city, elected a nonpartisan mayor for the first time since Croatia gained independence in 1991. SDP's candidate was eliminated in the first round. Iva Rinčić defeated the incumbent mayor Marko Filipović.

In Osijek the incumbent mayor Ivan Radić (HDZ) was re-elected by a landslide, winning more than 70% of the votes.

== Additional elections ==
In counties, cities, towns, and municipalities where the regular elections resulted in the underrepresentation of national minorities or ethnic Croats (where they constitute a minority), additional elections were held on 5 October 2025.

The Government of Croatia initially called additional elections for 75 regional and local councils, but as no candidates were submitted for 12 of them, elections were ultimately conducted for 63 councils. In 50 local units, only a single political party submitted its list of candidates.

A total of 474 polling stations were opened on election day. The additional elections were marked by a very low voter turnout of 7.5%. The lowest turnout, only 1.07%, was recorded in the elections for the County Council of Istria. The highest turnout of 58.7% was registered in the municipality of Nijemci, where the Independent Democratic Serb Party received 65 votes, narrowly defeating the Social Democratic Party of Croatia, which won 58 votes.
