= List of mayors in Croatia =

Results of the 2025 local elections, showing the elected municipal mayor for each municipality of Croatia

This is a list of current mayors of cities and towns in Croatia. There are 128 directly elected Croatian mayors.

== Key ==
Mayors by political party
Party	Mayors
HDZ	61
Independent	27
SDP	19
IDS	5
Možemo!	2
HSS	2
HSLS	2
NLM	2
Most	1
DP	1
NPS	1
HS	1
HSP	1
Focus	1
PGS	1
LiPO	1

== List ==
City / town	County	Current Mayor	Party
Zagreb	City of Zagreb	Tomislav Tomašević	We Can!
Split	Split-Dalmatia	Tomislav Šuta	Croatian Democratic Union
Rijeka	Primorje-Gorski Kotar	Iva Rinčić	Independent
Osijek	Osijek-Baranja	Ivan Radić	Croatian Democratic Union
Zadar	Zadar	Šime Erlić	Croatian Democratic Union
Velika Gorica	Zagreb	Krešimir Ačkar	Croatian Democratic Union
Slavonski Brod	Brod-Posavina	Mirko Duspara	Independent
Pula	Istria	Peđa Grbin	Social Democratic Party of Croatia
Karlovac	Karlovac	Damir Mandić	Croatian Democratic Union
Sisak	Sisak-Moslavina	Domagoj Orlić	Croatian Democratic Union
Varaždin	Varaždin	Neven Bosilj	Social Democratic Party of Croatia
Šibenik	Šibenik-Knin	Željko Burić	Croatian Democratic Union
Dubrovnik	Dubrovnik-Neretva	Mato Franković	Croatian Democratic Union
Bjelovar	Bjelovar-Bilogora	Dario Hrebak	Croatian Social Liberal Party
Kaštela	Split-Dalmatia	Denis Ivanović	Croatian Democratic Union
Samobor	Zagreb	Petra Škrobot	Focus
Vinkovci	Vukovar-Srijem	Josip Romić	Croatian Democratic Union
Koprivnica	Koprivnica-Križevci	Mišel Jakšić	Social Democratic Party of Croatia
Đakovo	Osijek-Baranja	Marin Mandarić	Croatian Democratic Union
Vukovar	Vukovar-Srijem	Marijan Pavliček	Croatian Sovereignists
Čakovec	Međimurje	Ljerka Cividini	Independent
Požega	Požega-Slavonia	Borislav Miličević	Croatian Democratic Union
Zaprešić	Zagreb	Željko Turk	Croatian Democratic Union
Sinj	Split-Dalmatia	Miro Bulj	The Bridge
Petrinja	Sisak-Moslavina	Magdalena Komes	Croatian Democratic Union
Solin	Split-Dalmatia	Dalibor Ninčević	Croatian Democratic Union
Kutina	Sisak-Moslavina	Zlatko Babić	Independent
Virovitica	Virovitica-Podravina	Ivica Kirin	Croatian Democratic Union
Križevci	Koprivnica-Križevci	Tomislav Katanović	Independent
Sveta Nedelja	Zagreb	Dario Zurovec	Independent
Dugo Selo	Zagreb	Nenad Panian	Independent
Metković	Dubrovnik-Neretva	Dalibor Milan	Croatian Democratic Union
Poreč	Istria	Loris Peršurić	Istrian Democratic Assembly
Našice	Osijek-Baranja	Krešimir Kašuba	Croatian Democratic Union
Sveti Ivan Zelina	Zagreb	Eva Jendriš Škrljak	Croatian Democratic Union
Jastrebarsko	Zagreb	Zvonimir Novosel	Social Democratic Party of Croatia
Knin	Šibenik-Knin	Marijo Ćaćić	Independent
Omiš	Split-Dalmatia	Zvonko Močić	Independent
Vrbovec	Zagreb	Denis Kralj	Social Democratic Party of Croatia
Ivanić-Grad	Zagreb	Javor Bojan Leš	Croatian Democratic Union
Rovinj	Istria	Emil Nimčević	Istrian Democratic Assembly
Nova Gradiška	Brod-Posavina	Vinko Grgić	Independent
Ogulin	Karlovac	Dalibor Domitrović	Social Democratic Party of Croatia
Makarska	Split-Dalmatia	Zoran Paunović	Social Democratic Party of Croatia
Ivanec	Varaždin	Milorad Batinić	Independent Platform of the North
Slatina	Virovitica-Podravina	Tomo Tomić	Croatian Democratic Union
Novska	Sisak-Moslavina	Marija Kušmiš	Croatian Democratic Union
Umag	Istria	Vili Bassanese	Social Democratic Party of Croatia
Novi Marof	Varaždin	Siniša Jenkač	Croatian Democratic Union
Trogir	Split-Dalmatia	Ante Bilić	Social Democratic Party of Croatia
Gospić	Lika-Senj	Darko Milinović	LiPO
Krapina	Krapina-Zagorje	Zoran Gregurović	Croatian Democratic Union
Županja	Vukovar-Srijem	Damir Juzbašić	Independent
Popovača	Sisak-Moslavina	Josip Mišković	Croatian Party of Rights
Opatija	Primorje-Gorski Kotar	Fernando Kirigin	Social Democratic Party of Croatia
Labin	Istria	Donald Blašković	Independent
Daruvar	Bjelovar-Bilogora	Damir Lneniček	Croatian Democratic Union
Valpovo	Osijek-Baranja	Matko Šutalo	Independent
Pleternica	Požega-Slavonia	Marija Šarić	Croatian Democratic Union
Duga Resa	Karlovac	Tomislav Boljar	Croatian Peasant Party
Crikvenica	Primorje-Gorski Kotar	Ivona Matošić Gašparović	Croatian Democratic Union
Benkovac	Zadar	Tomislav Bulić	Croatian Democratic Union
Belišće	Osijek-Baranja	Ivana Jerbić	Independent
Imotski	Split-Dalmatia	Luka Kolovrat	Croatian Democratic Union
Garešnica	Bjelovar-Bilogora	Josip Bilandžija	Croatian Democratic Union
Kastav	Primorje-Gorski Kotar	Matej Mostarac	Social Democratic Party of Croatia
Ploče	Dubrovnik-Neretva	Ivan Marević	Social Democratic Party of Croatia
Beli Manastir	Osijek-Baranja	Igor Pavelić	Croatian Democratic Union
Otočac	Lika-Senj	Goran Bukovac	Independent
Donji Miholjac	Osijek-Baranja	Dražen Trcović	Croatian Democratic Union
Glina	Sisak-Moslavina	Ivan Janković	Independent
Trilj	Split-Dalmatia	Ivan Bugarin	Croatian Democratic Union
Zabok	Krapina-Zagorje	Valentina Đurek	Social Democratic Party of Croatia
Vodice	Šibenik-Knin	Ante Cukrov	Croatian Democratic Union
Pazin	Istria	Suzana Jašić	We Can!
Ludbreg	Varaždin	Dubravko Bilić	Independent
Pakrac	Požega-Slavonia	Tomislav Novinc	Croatian Democratic Union
Lepoglava	Varaždin	Željko Šoštarić	Croatian Peasant Party
Bakar	Primorje-Gorski Kotar	Tomislav Klarić	Croatian Democratic Union
Đurđevac	Koprivnica-Križevci	Hrvoje Janči	Independent
Mali Lošinj	Primorje-Gorski Kotar	Ana Kučić	Croatian Democratic Union
Čazma	Bjelovar-Bilogora	Valentina Čanađija	Croatian Social Liberal Party
Rab	Primorje-Gorski Kotar	Nikola Grgurić	Croatian Democratic Union
Prelog	Međimurje	Ljubomir Kolarek	Croatian Democratic Union
Drniš	Šibenik-Knin	Tomislav Dželalija	Croatian Democratic Union
Senj	Lika-Senj	Željko Tomljanović	Croatian Democratic Union
Ozalj	Karlovac	Lidija Bošnjak	Independent
Ilok	Vukovar-Srijem	Renata Banožić	Croatian Democratic Union
Pregrada	Krapina-Zagorje	Goran Vukmanić	Croatian Democratic Union
Vrgorac	Split-Dalmatia	Mile Herceg	Independent Youth List
Grubišno Polje	Bjelovar-Bilogora	Zlatko Pavičić	Croatian Democratic Union
Varaždinske Toplice	Varaždin	Dragica Ratković	Croatian Democratic Union
Otok	Vukovar-Srijem	Slavko Grgić	Homeland Movement
Mursko Središće	Međimurje	Dražen Srpak	Croatian Democratic Union
Krk	Primorje-Gorski Kotar	Darijo Vasilić	Alliance of Primorje-Gorski Kotar
Kutjevo	Požega-Slavonia	Josip Budimir	Croatian Democratic Union
Lipik	Požega-Slavonia	Vinko Kasana	Croatian Democratic Union
Oroslavje	Krapina-Zagorje	Viktor Šimunić	Independent
Buzet	Istria	Damir Kajin	Independent
Vodnjan	Istria	Igor Orlić	Istrian Democratic Assembly
Zlatar	Krapina-Zagorje	Jasenka Auguštan-Pentek	Social Democratic Party of Croatia
Delnice	Primorje-Gorski Kotar	Igor Pleše	Social Democratic Party of Croatia
Donja Stubica	Krapina-Zagorje	Nikola Gospočić	Independent
Korčula	Dubrovnik-Neretva	Frano Jeričević	Croatian Democratic Union
Biograd na Moru	Zadar	Ivan Knez	Croatian Democratic Union
Orahovica	Virovitica-Podravina	Milan Babac	Social Democratic Party of Croatia
Buje	Istria	Fabrizio Vižintin	Istrian Democratic Assembly
Novi Vinodolski	Primorje-Gorski Kotar	Tomislav Cvitković	Croatian Democratic Union
Slunj	Karlovac	Mirjana Puškarić	Croatian Democratic Union
Vrbovsko	Primorje-Gorski Kotar	Dražen Mufić	Independent
Kraljevica	Primorje-Gorski Kotar	Dalibor Čandrlić	Croatian Democratic Union
Novigrad	Istria	Anteo Milos	Istrian Democratic Assembly
Obrovac	Zadar	Ante Župan	Croatian Democratic Union
Hvar	Split-Dalmatia	Šime Ravlić	Croatian Democratic Union
Supetar	Split-Dalmatia	Ivana Marković	Social Democratic Party of Croatia
Pag	Zadar	Stipe Žunić	Independent Youth List
Skradin	Šibenik-Knin	Antonijo Brajković	Croatian Democratic Union
Čabar	Primorje-Gorski Kotar	Antonio Dražović	Independent
Novalja	Lika-Senj	Ivan Dabo	Croatian Democratic Union
Opuzen	Dubrovnik-Neretva	Ivan Mataga	Independent
Klanjec	Krapina-Zagorje	Zlatko Brlek	Social Democratic Party of Croatia
Cres	Primorje-Gorski Kotar	Marin Gregorović	Social Democratic Party of Croatia
Stari Grad	Split-Dalmatia	Vinko Vranjican	Croatian Democratic Union
Hrvatska Kostajnica	Sisak-Moslavina	Dalibor Bišćan	Croatian Democratic Union
Nin	Zadar	Emil Ćurko	Croatian Democratic Union
Vrlika	Split-Dalmatia	Jure Plazonić	Croatian Democratic Union
Vis	Split-Dalmatia	Hrvoje Mratinić	Independent
Komiža	Split-Dalmatia	Ivica Vitaljić	Independent

Updated on 1 August 2025.

== See also ==
- Croatian local elections
- List of mayors of Zagreb
- List of mayors of Split
- List of mayors of Rijeka
- List of mayors of Osijek
- List of mayors of Zadar
- List of mayors of Pula
- List of county prefects of Croatia
