= 2025 Osijek local elections =

Local elections in Croatia

- 18 May 2025
- Turnout: 33.42% ▼6,06%
Candidate	Ivan Radić	Vjeran Marijašević	Zlatko Ahić
Party	HDZ	SDP	DOMiNO
Popular vote	20,300	5,080	1,656
Percentage	70.95%	17.75%	5.78%
Candidate	Domagoj Bandeković
Party	HDSSB
Popular vote	745
Percentage	2.60%
Mayor before election
Ivan Radić
HDZ
Elected mayor
Ivan Radić
HDZ

Elections were held in Osijek, Croatia, on 18 May 2025 for the next Mayor of Osijek, the two deputy mayors and the 27 members of the Osijek City Council, as part of the 2025 Croatian local elections.

== Mayoral election ==
Candidates		First round	
Candidate	Party	Votes	%
Ivan Radić	Croatian Democratic Union	20,300	70.95
Vjeran Marijašević	Social Democratic Party	5,080	17.75
Zlatko Ahić	Home and National Rally	1,656	5.78
Domagoj Bandeković	Croatian Democratic Alliance of Slavonia and Baranja	745	2.60
Total votes:		28,608	97.15
Invalid votes:		816	2.85
Turnout:		28,608	33.42
Registered voters:		85.589	
The percentages of votes from each candidate are calculated from number of valid voters. The percentages of valid and invalid votes are calculated from the turnout number. The turnout percentage is calculated from the number of expected voters.

== Council election ==
Party list	Previous seats	Votes	%	Seats	%	Seat change
Croatian Democratic Union; Croatian Social Liberal Party; Croatian People's Party – Liberal Democrats; Independent list of Anto Đapić; Independent list of Tomislav Mišetić	15 / 31	16,168	58.76	19 / 27	70.37	▲4
Social Democratic Party of Croatia; We can!	8 / 31	5.761	20.93	6 / 27	22.22	▼2
Home and National Rally; The Bridge; Croatian Sovereignists; Bloc Pensioner Together; Croatian Party of Rights	3 / 31	2.072	7.53	2 / 27	7.41	▼1
Croatian Party of Pensioners	1 / 31	971	3.52	0 / 27	0.00	▼1
Power of Slavonia and Baranja; Republic	2 / 31	821	2.98	0 / 27	0.00	▼2
Active Independent Pensioners	0 / 31	759	2.75	0 / 27	0.00	0
Croatian Democratic Alliance of Slavonia and Baranja; Croatian Peasant Party	0 / 37	625	2.27	0 / 27	0.00	0
Independent Democratic Serb Party	0 / 37	336	1.22	0 / 27	0.00	0
Total:		27,513	96.48	27		▼4
Invalid votes:		1,003	3.52			
Turnout:		28,522	33.32			
Registered voters:		85,590				
The percentages of votes from each list are calculated from number of valid voters The percentages of valid and invalid votes are calculated from the turnout number The turnout percentage is calculated from the number of expected voters

== See also ==
- 2025 Croatian local elections
- 2025 Zagreb local elections
- 2025 Split local elections
- 2025 Rijeka local elections
- List of mayors in Croatia
- List of mayors of Osijek
