= 2017 Rijeka local elections =

Local elections in Croatia

2017 Rijeka mayoral election
- 21 May 2017 and 4 June 2017
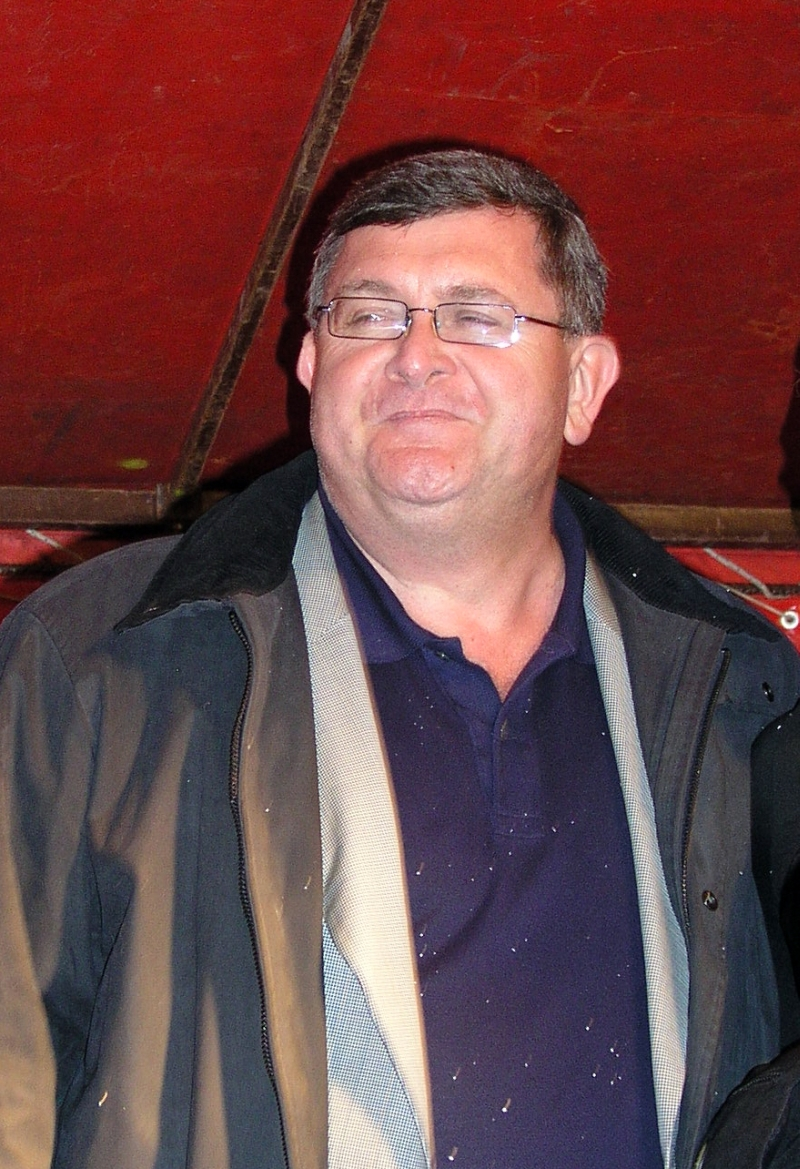
Candidate	Vojko Obersnel	Hrvoje Burić
Party	SDP	Independent
Popular vote	17.410	13.371
Percentage	55,59%	42,70%
Mayor before election
Vojko Obersnel
SDP
Elected mayor
Vojko Obersnel
SDP

The 2017 Rijeka local elections were held on 21 May and 4 June 2017 for the Mayor of Rijeka and members of the Rijeka city council. Vojko Obersnel, the 14th and incumbent mayor who has been in office since 2000, ran for a sixth consecutive four-year term, finishing in 1st place with 41,00% of the vote in the first round. However, as no candidate won an absolute majority of the vote in the first round, a second round of elections was held on 4 June 2017 between the two highest-ranked candidates in terms of popular vote: Vojko Obersnel of the Social Democratic Party of Croatia, and independent Hrvoje Burić . Obersenel defeated Burić by a wide margin in the run-off, taking 55,6% of the vote to Borić's 42,7%. Turnout in the election was 36,7% in the first round and 28,4% in the second round.

This was the third direct election for the mayor of Rijeka (simultaneously held with elections for all other county prefects and mayors in Croatia) since the popular vote method was introduced in 2009, as previously those officials had been elected by their county assemblies or city councils.

On 2 June a large number of cultural workers and athletes signed a public letter of support to the SDP candidate and the current mayor Vojko Obersnel. In the letter they state that "Rijeka is an example of an inclusive European city, the capital of all kinds of freedoms, especially those of art" and that it is appropriate that Rijeka retains the title of European Capital of Culture. They also expressed concerns about the other candidate Hrvoje Burić who, as a former city councilor, has long represented more than crude rhetoric with extreme conservative politics. Among the signatories are Mira Furlan and Luciano Sušanj.

== Results ==
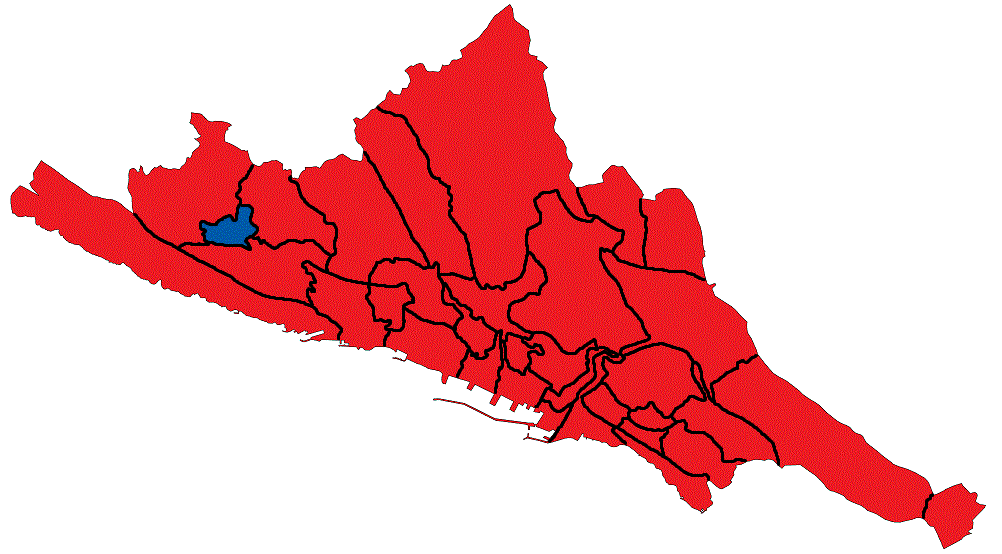
Results of the election for Mayor of Rijeka: the candidate with the majority of votes in each local committee: Vojko Obersnel (SDP) Kristjan Staničić (HDZ)

=== Mayoral election ===
Candidates		First round		Runoff	
Candidate	Party	Votes	%	Votes	%
Vojko Obersnel	Social Democratic Party of Croatia	16,490	40.88%	17.410	55,59%
Hrvoje Burić	Independent	7,123	17.66%	13.371	42,70%
Kristjan Staničić	Croatian Democratic Union	5,627	13.95%		
Andrej Briščik	Youth Action	3,249	8.05%		
Juraj Bukša	Croatian People's Party – Liberal Democrats	2,932	7,27%		
Petra Mandić	Bridge of Independent Lists	2,247	5.57%		
Danko Švorinić	List for Fiume	1,867	4.63%		
Valid votes:		39,535	98.11%	30.781	98.31%
Invalid votes:		761	1.89%	529	1.69%
Turnout:		40,337	36.65%	31,316	28.42%
Expected voters:		110,071		110,187	
The percentages of votes from each candidate are calculated from number of valid voters The percentages of valid and invalid votes are calculated from the turnout number The turnout percentage is calculated from the number of expected voters
Source: State Election Committee (Državno izborno povjerenstvo)

=== City council election ===
Party list	Votes	%	Seats	%	Seat change
Social Democratic Party of Croatia; Alliance of Primorje-Gorski Kotar; Croatian Party of Pensioners; Istrian Democratic Assembly; Croatian Labourists – Labour Party; Independent Democratic Serb Party; Croatian Peasant Party	14,922	37.78%	15	40.54%	▼5
Croatian Democratic Union	7,460	18.89%	7	18.91%	▲2
Youth Action; Human Shield; SNAGA; Alternativet	4,758	12.04%	5	13.51%	▲4
Independent list of Hrvoje Burić	4,315	10.92%	4	10.81%	0
List for Fiume; Pametno	2,753	6.97%	2	5.41%	0
Bridge of Independent Lists	2,615	6.62%	2	5.41%	▲2
Croatian People's Party-Liberal Democrats; Autonomous Regional Party; Party of Democratic Action of Croatia	2,463	6.23%	2	5.41%	▼1
Independent list of Antonio Dražović	204	0.51%	0	0.00%	0
Total:	39,490	98.03%	37		▲2
Invalid votes:	794	1.97%			
Turnout:	40,284	36.60%			
Expected voters:	110,071				
The percentages of votes from each list are calculated from number of valid voters The percentages of valid and invalid votes are calculated from the turnout number The turnout percentage is calculated from the number of expected voters
Source: City of Rijeka (Konačni rezultati izbora za članove Gradskog vijeća Grada Rijeke)

== See also ==
- 2017 Croatian local elections
- List of mayors in Croatia
