= 2025 Split local elections =

Elections for local government in Croatia

- 18 May 2025 (first round); 1 June 2025 (second round)
- Turnout: 37.34% (first round)▲5.77% 43.53% (runoff)▲13.58%
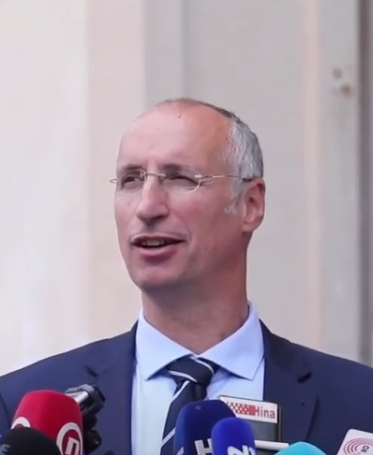
Candidate	Tomislav Šuta	Ivica Puljak
Party	HDZ	Centre
First round	16,002; 30.54%	18,476; 35.26%
Runoff	30,586; 53.19%	26,921; 46.81%
Mayor before election
Ivica Puljak
Centre
Elected mayor
Tomislav Šuta
HDZ

Elections were held in Split, Croatia, on 18 May 2025 for the 74th Mayor of Split, the two deputy mayors and the 31 members of the Split City Council, as a part of the 2025 Croatian local elections.

== Mayoral election ==
Candidates		First round		Second round	
Candidate	Party	Votes	%	Votes	%
Ivica Puljak	Centre	18,476	35.26	26,921	46.81
Tomislav Šuta	Croatian Democratic Union	16,002	30.54	30,586	53.19
Željko Kerum	Croatian Civic Party	7,710	14.71		
Davor Matijević	Social Democratic Party of Croatia	5,157	9.84		
Franko Kelam	The Bridge	2,289	4.36		
Marina Kovačević	Independent	1,295	2.47		
Valid votes:		50,929	97.25	57,507	97.15
Invalid votes:		1,439	2.75	1,687	2.85
Turnout:		52,393	37.34	59,224	42.20
Registered voters:		140,308		140,327	
The percentages of votes from each candidate are calculated from number of valid voters. The percentages of valid and invalid votes are calculated from the turnout number. The turnout percentage is calculated from the number of expected voters.

== Council election ==
Party list	Previous seats	Votes	%	Seats	%	Seat change
Centre	15 / 31	15,888	31.07	11 / 31	35.48	▼4
Croatian Democratic Union; Homeland Movement; Croatian Social Liberal Party; Croatian Demochristian Party	10 / 31	14,463	28.28	10 / 31	32.26	0
Croatian Civic Party	2 / 31	5,814	11.37	4 / 31	12.90	▲2
Social Democratic Party of Croatia; We can! Direct	2 / 31	5,794	11.33	4 / 31	12.90	▲2
The Bridge; Home and National Rally; Croatian Party of Rights; Bloc of Penzioners Together	2 / 31	2,801	5.47	2 / 31	6.45	0
Fix the City	0 / 31	2,374	4.64	0 / 31	0.00	0
Independent list of Tomislav Jonjić; Bloc for Croatia	0 / 31	1,984	3.88	0 / 31	0.00	0
Croatian Party of Pensioners; Croatian People's Party – Liberal Democrats; Croatian Peasant Party	0 / 31	1,105	2.16	0 / 31	0.00	0
Independent list of Marina Kovačević	0 / 31	906	1.77	0 / 31	0.00	0
Total:		51,129	97.72	31		0
Invalid votes:		1,194	2.28			
Turnout:		52,341	37.30			
Expected voters:		140,309				
The percentages of votes from each list are calculated from number of valid voters. The percentages of valid and invalid votes are calculated from the turnout number. The turnout percentage is calculated from the number of expected voters.

== See also ==
- List of mayors in Croatia
- List of mayors of Split
- 2025 Croatian local elections
- 2025 Zagreb local elections
- 2025 Rijeka local elections
- 2025 Osijek local elections
