= Siniša Hajdaš Dončić =

Croatian politician (born 1974)

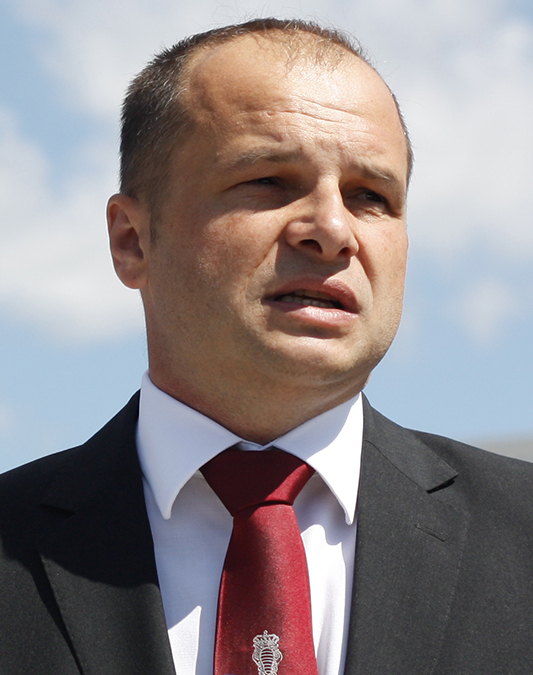
- Hajdaš Dončić in 2016

Leader of the Opposition
- Incumbent
- Assumed office 21 September 2024
- Prime Minister: Andrej Plenković
- Preceded by: Peđa Grbin

President of the Social Democratic Party
- Incumbent
- Assumed office 21 September 2024
- Preceded by: Peđa Grbin

Member of the Croatian Parliament for the 3rd constituency
- Incumbent
- Assumed office 22 December 2011

Minister of Maritime Affairs, Transport and Infrastructure
- In office 18 April 2012 – 22 January 2016
- Prime Minister: Zoran Milanović
- Preceded by: Zlatko Komadina
- Succeeded by: Oleg Butković

Prefect of the Krapina-Zagorje County
- In office 8 June 2009 – 18 April 2012
- Preceded by: Sonja Borovčak
- Succeeded by: Željko Kolar

Personal details
- Born: 29 June 1974 (age 52) Zabok, SR Croatia, SFR Yugoslavia
- Party: Social Democratic Party (2005–present)
- Spouse: Martina Hajdaš Dončić (m. 2003)
- Children: 2
- Education: University of Zagreb; University of Split

Siniša Hajdaš Dončić (né Hajdaš; born 29 June 1974) is a Croatian politician serving as president of the center-left Social Democratic Party (SDP), and as leader of the opposition since September 2024.

He previously served as minister of maritime affairs, transport and infrastructure from 2012 to 2016 in the Cabinet of Zoran Milanović. Before that, he served as Prefect of the Krapina-Zagorje County in northern Croatia from 2009 to 2012.

== Early life and education ==
Hajdaš Dončić was born in the small town of Zabok, Yugoslavia, in modern-day Croatia, on 29 June 1974. He graduated from the Faculty of Economics and Business at the University of Zagreb in 1999. He finished postgraduate studies in 2002, and defended his doctoral dissertation at the University of Split in 2012.

In the 1990s, he would go to Philadelphia during summers with the help of his cousin who worked in the United States. After experiencing a culture shock, Hajdaš Dončić wanted to study in the country, but was forced to come back to Croatia due to a lack of funds.

== Career ==
Hajdaš Dončić has been a lecturer at the Professional Business School of Higher Education LIBERTAS and at the college for business and management Baltazar Adam Krčelić in Zagreb since 2002.

From 2002 until 2006, he was head of the department for economy, agriculture and tourism in Krapina-Zagorje County. From 2006 to 2009, he was the director of the Zagorje Development Agency (Croatian: Zagorska razvojna agencija).

He joined the Social Democratic Party (SDP) in 2005, and quickly became a member of the Main Committee in 2007. In 2009, he became the party's president for the Krapina-Zagorje County, where he would serve as Prefect between June 2009 and April 2012. He left his position early to serve as minister of maritime affairs, transport and infrastructure in the Cabinet of Zoran Milanović from April 2012 until January 2016. He would also become member of the Croatian Parliament in 2011, a position he holds to this day.

In September 2024, he became president of the SDP, succeeding Peđa Grbin as Leader of the Opposition.

== Minister of Maritime Affairs, Transport and Infrastructure (2012–2016) ==
Hajdaš-Dončić was the second transport minister in the Milanović government, succeeding Zlatko Komadina. Komadina resigned three months after taking office, citing health problems. After being sworn in on 18 April 2012, Hajdaš Dončić said that his mandate “will be imbued with determination, transparency and the introduction of order in all departments covered by the Ministry of Maritime Affairs, Transport and Infrastructure”.

=== Roadways ===
In December 2012, Hajdaš Dončić was at the opening of the 16.1 km (10.0 mi) Vrgorac – Karamatići section of the A1 highway and the 7.5 km (4.7 mi) Metković interchange – border with Bosnia and Herzegovina section of the A10 highway. Construction started under the previous government, during Božidar Kalmeta’s mandate. The opening took place alongside a small protest from the residents of nearby villages.

==== Highways monetisation ====
In 2013, the national highways operator Croatian Highways was €3.2 billion in debt. In order to ease financial pressures, Hajdaš Dončić proposed monetising national highways by giving concessions to foreign companies and investors. That meant that the investors would, for a set price, be given the ability to operate and maintain highways, set toll prices and collect all the revenue. They would also be able to set worker pay and terminate their contracts, while the highways themselves would remain government property. The move sparked a public backlash, and the opposition demanded Hajdaš Dončić step down. Critics feared the investors would raise toll prices and fire workers in order to achieve profitability. A vote demanding a referendum on the monetisation, which was set up in November 2014, got 530,000 signatures from citizens dissatisfied with the government’s decision. Its organizers then handed the signatures to the Croatian Parliament, and after an inspection by the Croatian Bureau of Statistics, 460,000 signatures were confirmed as authentic by January 2015, enough to trigger a referendum. However, in April the Constitutional Court of Croatia ruled the referendum unconstitutional, citing that the government had authority to execute the plan. Nonetheless, the backlash was enough for the government abandon the project in March, which warned that Croatian Highways and Highway Rijeka-Zagreb (ARZ) would end the year with a deficit. When asked about it, Hajdaš Dončić responded with “the wiser head gives in”.

The government pivoted to selling Croatian Highways to domestic pension funds and citizens themselves, aiming to raise around €1.2 billion. That would ensure that the company would stay in the hands of domestic investors, rather than foreign, while paying off its debt. There were also talks about a third option to ease financial pressures – issuing government bonds to help pay off the company’s debt. Despite that, at the end, none of the plans were executed. In the three years, from 2013 to 2016, the company’s debt shrunk by €64 million to €3.136 billion. Its budget was also strained by the lowering of the fuel tax, resulting in a 50% decline in tax revenue. Following the change in government, new Transport Minister Oleg Butković rejected both privatization and monetisation, instead favoring paying off existing debt through loans from the World Bank.

=== Railways ===
In September 2015, Hajdaš Dončić inspected the 10th new low floor Končar train that was bought for regional commutes.

=== Air ===
In May 2014, Hajdaš Dončić and Prime Minister Zoran Milanović attended the opening ceremony of the construction of Zagreb Airport’s new passenger terminal worth €243 million. The new terminal would also include a new airstrip, parking, and new access roads. The project was made possible by a public-private partnership between the Croatian Government and Aéroports de Paris, Bouygues Construction, TAV Airports, Viadukt, Marguerite fund and IFC. In April 2012, days before Hajdaš Dončić became minister, the airport was sold to the same consortium of French and Turkish firms until 2042.

In May 2015, Dubrovnik Airport secured €148 million from the European Investment Bank with the help of the Croatian Government to construct a new passenger terminal, renovate the airstrip and construct a new administrative building. The goal was to relieve the existing terminal, which saw almost 2 million passengers in 2016, and better connect Dubrovnik with the rest of the world amid growing tourist demand. The investment was welcomed by the Mayor of Dubrovnik Andro Vlahušić. The final cost of the project reached €225 million, with the passenger terminal opening in May 2017.

In October 2015, Hajdaš Dončić announced that a new Split Airport passenger terminal would begin construction in spring 2016. The €60 million investment was meant increase the airport’s capacity to over 2 million passengers per year and bring in a new, modern look. However, construction wouldn’t start until December 2016, 11 months after Hajdaš Dončić left office.

== Leader of the Opposition (2024–present) ==
After a defeat in the 2024 parliamentary election, which saw Andrej Plenković and HDZ win a third mandate, and in the 2024 European Parliament election, Peđa Grbin admitted defeat and announced he would not seek reelection as president of the party. Voting took place on 14 September, and none of the six candidates won a majority of the vote. Siniša Hajdaš Dončić came in the closest with 48.78%, while Zoran Paunović came in second with 20.65%. A second round of voting between the two took place a week later on 21 September. After the counting ended, Hajdaš Dončić was declared winner and new president of the SDP with 56.46% of the vote, or 4,447 votes, while Paunović got 3,430 or 43.54% of the vote. The turnout was less than 40%, which the party called defeating. In his address statement, Hajdaš Dončić said that he will defend minority, women's and sexual minorities rights, as well as promote anti-facism.

As leader of the opposition, Hajdaš Dončić strengthened the relationship with We Can!, a more left-wing and progressive political party, and has been seen at their events alongside Sandra Benčić and Tomislav Tomašević. In the 2025 Zagreb local election, the SDP and We Can! ran on a joint ticket, and are signaling a coalition for the upcoming parliamentary election. At a party conference in January 2026, the main themes were shortening of work hours, strengthening the role of unions, and giving tax breaks to companies that increase wages. Hajdaš Dončić also called for a more progressive tax system, and urged party members to reject ultraconservatism. The HDZ responded on Facebook with a post saying that the SDP and We Can! have some of the highest local taxes in cities they control, like Zagreb and Rijeka.

In June 2025, after the local elections, the SDP fired the party's leadership in four biggest cities: Zagreb, Rijeka, Split, and Osijek. In Split, the firings for their defeat included president Davor Matijević, who left the party entirely just a month later, which he explained in a Facebook post writing "after 17 years of membership, I am resigning as Executive Secretary for Dalmatia and member of the head committee, leaving the party and giving you a chance to recover without me."

== Controversy ==
In August 2012, images surfaced of an email from Krunoslav Šamsa to Zagreb Airport employees in which he informed them he would become the new deputy director for the concession of the airport, which was government owned. The leaks sparked a backlash because the email was written in June, despite the public procurement being announced two months later on 9 August. Siniša Hajdaš Dončić, who was accused of manipulating the hiring process, confirmed the credibility of the email, but said that the public procurement was still ongoing and that nobody had been hired yet. He said that Šamsa was one of the most qualified people to lead the role, and that if someone better made an offer for the position, they would be chosen instead. Despite the comments, the public procurement was later terminated and Šamsa was not given the position.

== Personal life ==
Siniša Hajdaš Dončić is married to Martina Hajdaš Dončić since 2003, with whom he has two children. He met her, who was also an activist, at a festival in Krapina. To show his appreciation, he added her surname to his own, an unusual practice in Croatia. He was once a member of the Croatian Democratic Union, for which he said it was his father's fault and that he wasn't active.

== See also ==
- Cabinet of Zoran Milanović
