= Željko Kolar =

Croatian politician (born 1967)

Prefect of the Krapina-Zagorje County
- Incumbent
- Assumed office 3 June 2013
- Preceded by: Siniša Hajdaš Dončić

Member of the Croatian Parliament
- In office 22 December 2011 – 3 June 2013
- Prime Minister: Zoran Milanović
- Constituency: III electoral district

Mayor of Klanjec
- In office 2009–2013
- Succeeded by: Zlatko Brlek

Personal details
- Born: 10 August 1967 (age 58) Klanjec, SR Croatia, SFR Yugoslavia
- Party: Social Democratic Party
- Spouse: Mira Hrbud Kolar
- Children: 2

Željko Kolar (born 10 August 1967) is a Croatian politician serving as prefect of the Krapina-Zagorje County since 2013. A member of the Social Democratic Party of Croatia (SDP), he previously served as a member of the Croatian Parliament from 2011 to 2013 and as mayor of Klanjec from 2009 to 2013.

== Biography ==
Kolar was born on August 10, 1967 in Klanjec. He graduated from the Geodetic Technical School in Zagreb.

In the 2009 Croatian local elections he ran for mayor of Klanjec as the candidate of SDP, ZDS and HNS. He won with 65.14% of the vote.

In the 2011 Croatian parliamentary election he ran in the third electoral district under the Kukuriku Coalition and won a seat in the Croatian Parliament. The Kukuriku Coalition won the election gaining 40.72% of the vote and 80 seats in the parliament.

In the 2013 Croatian local elections he ran for prefect of the Krapina-Zagorje County as the candidate of SDP, HNS, HSS, HSU and HSLS. He won in the first round with 51.72% of the vote. As Croatian law forbids serving in the parliament and being a county prefect at the same time, he was forced to resign from the parliament and was replaced by Dubravko Bilić who finished his term. He was re-elected as county prefect in the 2017, 2021 and 2025 elections.

He ran in the 2020 and 2024 parliamentary elections and won in both but gave up his seat due to the aforementioned law. His replacement in the 2020 term was Željko Pavić and in the 2024 term it was Anita Curiš Krok.

== Personal life ==
He is married to Mira Hrbud Kolar and the couple has 2 children.
