= 2003 Croatian national minorities councils and representatives elections =

18 May 2003	2007 →

471 Councils and 140 Representatives
- Registered: 319 141 (county level)
- Turnout: COUNCILS: Counties: 37,752 out of 320,793 (10.21%); Cities: 14,422 out of 132,991 (10.48%); Municipalities: 19,607 out of 88,615 (22.13%); REPRESENTATIVES: Counties: 790 out of 4,992 (15.83%); Cities: 353 out of 1,444 (24,45%); Municipalities: 27 out of 115 (17.42%)

The 2003 Croatian national minorities councils and representatives elections took place on 18 May. 2003 elections were the first minorities councils and representatives elections after the introduction of the new Constitutional Act on the Rights of National Minorities in the Republic of Croatia in late 2002. Elections took place both at local (municipalities and towns/cities) and regional (county) level with different numbers of electorate at two levels due to the specific provisions of the law.

Specifically, 319 141 registered voters fulfilled individual and collective conditions on the county, 130 730 on the town/city level and 88 085 on municipal level. Individual requirement was that voter is registered as a member of national minority at the time of last census. Collective condition required the Government of Croatia to organize councils elections only in those counties or local units in which certain minority constitute required proportion of population in relative (1,5% of the entire population) or absolute (200 individuals in town or municipality or 500 in county) numbers. If those conditions are not fulfilled Government organizes representatives elections in those units where there are at least 100 members of a certain minority.

National minorities were entitled to elect 471 councils in 17 counties, 38 cities or towns and 80 municipalities. Candidate lists were proposed for 220 of them (46,91%) while in remaining units elections were not organized due to the absence of candidate lists. National minorities were entitled to elect 140 individual representatives while candidate lists were proposed for just 40 of them (28,57%). Elections were observed by 21 members of the mobile team of the GONG, a non-governmental organization from Croatia that oversees elections in Croatia.

== See also ==
- Elections in Croatia
