= 2017 Croatian local elections =

- 21 May and 4 June 2017
Party	HDZ	SDP	HSS
Prefects	12	2	1
Prefects +/-	▲1	Steady	▼2
Party	NS-R	BM 365	HNS-LD
Prefects	1	1	1
Prefects +/-	▲1	Steady	▼1
Party	Mreža	IDS	Independent
Prefects	1	1	1
Prefects +/-	▲1	Steady	▲1
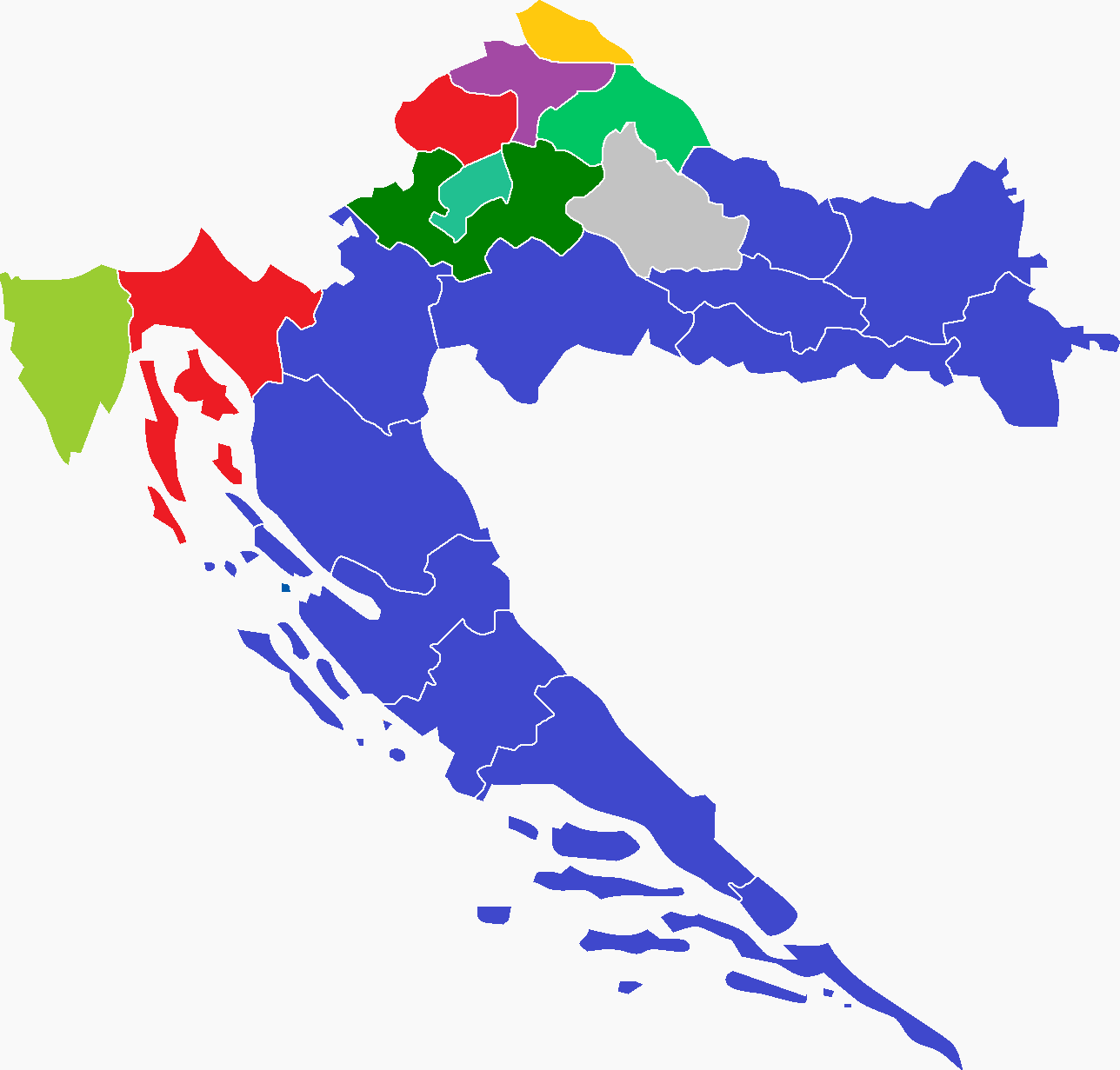
- Elected county prefects in each county of Croatia; HDZ SDP HSS HNS IDS NS-R BM 365 Independent Mreža

The first round of the 2017 Croatian local elections was held on 21 May and the second round, where necessary, on 4 June. All seats of the county prefects, city and municipal mayors and members of county, municipal and city councils were up for election.

In total, there were 9,576 open seats contested by 47,601 candidates. Voters were electing: 20 county prefects, 128 city mayors, 428 municipal mayors, 51 deputy county prefects, 195 deputy city mayors, 440 deputy municipal mayors, 63 deputy city and municipal mayors elected by the national minorities, 836 county councilors, 2,226 city councilors and 5,152 municipal councilors. 3,719,182 voters had the right to vote, which was 39,500 fewer than at the previous local elections. There were around 73,000 members of the polling and electoral commissions and more than 12,000 observers. State Election Commission distributed around 14,000,000 ballots. In the second round, held on 4 June, there were runoffs in eight counties, City of Zagreb, 54 towns and 102 municipalities. 2,791,000 voters had a right to vote. There were 4,443 polling stations. A third election round was held in Stari Grad on 18 June 2017 since both candidates got the same number of votes in the second round.

== Election results ==
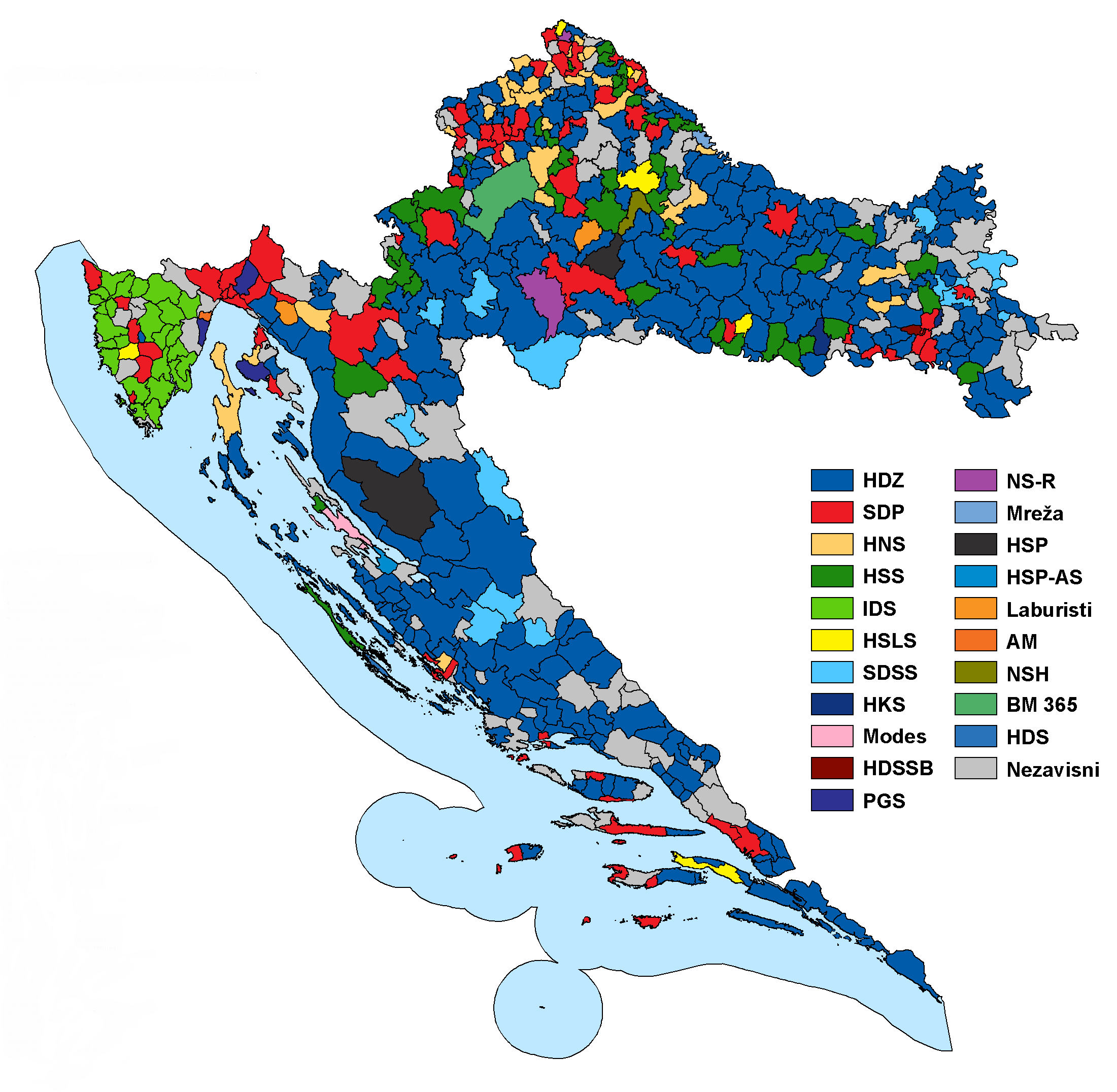
Results of the election, showing elected municipal mayors for each municipality

=== Counties ===
Results of 2017 elections in Croatian counties
County	County council		County prefect		
County	Plurality	Turnout	Prefect	Turnout	Notes
Bjelovar-Bilogora	HDZ (39.36%)	44.96%	Damir Bajs, Ind. (52.05%)	39.47%	first round win
Brod-Posavina	HDZ (41.76%)	44.67%	Danijel Marušić, HDZ (53.46%)	44.71%	first round win
Dubrovnik-Neretva	HDZ (44.99%)	56.84%	Nikola Dobroslavić, HDZ (58.54%)	46.93%	runoff election
Istria	IDS (56.78%)	45.14%	Valter Flego, IDS (65.61%)	45.14%	first round win
Karlovac	HDZ (44.42%)	48.08%	Damir Jelić, HDZ (50.46%)	48.10%	first round win
Koprivnica-Križevci	SDP (31.38%)	46.36%	Darko Koren, MREŽA (51.41%)	37.37%	runoff election
Krapina-Zagorje	SDP (49.66%)	52.41%	Željko Kolar, SDP (58.77%)	52.47%	first round win
Lika-Senj	HDZ (55.30%)	59.84%	Darko Milinović, HDZ (53.68%)	59.82%	first round win
Međimurje	HNS (37.21%)	44.67%	Matija Posavec, HNS (58.74%)	44.80%	first round win
Osijek-Baranja	HDZ (36.62%)	45.42%	Ivan Anušić, HDZ	34.80%	runoff election
Požega-Slavonia	HDZ (41.76%)	44.67%	Alojz Tomašević, HDZ (53.46%)	44.71%	first round win
Primorje-Gorski Kotar	SDP (41.66%)	42.54%	Zlatko Komadina, SDP (51.32%)	42.54%	first round win
Sisak-Moslavina	HDZ (42.77%)	46.32%	Ivo Žinić, HDZ (64.28%)	37.71%	runoff election
Split-Dalmatia	HDZ (38.24%)	47.82%	Blaženko Boban, HDZ	36.37%	runoff election
Šibenik-Knin	HDZ (44.40%)	48.40%	Goran Pauk, HDZ (67.76%)	34.03%	runoff election
Varaždin	HNS (40.28%)	49.28%	Radimir Čačić, NS-R	41.14%	runoff election
Virovitica-Podravina	HDZ (58.67%)	49.42%	Igor Andrović, HDZ (56.14%)	49.43%	first round win
Vukovar-Syrmia	HDZ (49.57%)	45.30%	Božo Galić, HDZ	30.55%	runoff election
Zadar	HDZ (52.07%)	45.50%	Božidar Longin, HDZ (50,09%)	45.47%	first round win
Zagreb County	HSS (37.01%)	45.14%	Stjepan Kožić, HSS (50,18%)	44.71%	first round win
City of Zagreb	BM 365 (23.03%)	47.62%	Milan Bandić, BM 365 (51.79%)	41.141%	runoff election

=== Cities ===
Results of 2017 elections in Croatian cities
	City Council		Mayor		
City	Plurality	Turnout	Mayor	Turnout	Note
Bakar	HDZ (56,25%)	45,78%	Tomislav Klarić, HDZ (70,78%)	45,78%	first round win
Beli Manastir	HDZ, HSU (47,55%)	44,64%	Tomislav Rob, HDZ (51,65%)	44,64%	first round win
Belišće	Ind. (60,28%)	48,65%	Dinko Burić, Ind. (71,06%)	48,64%	first round win
Benkovac	HDZ, HSP (50,16%)	30,76%	Tomislav Bulić, HDZ (49,15%)	30,76%	first round win
Biograd na Moru	HDZ (52,52%)	52,57%	Ivan Knez, HDZ, HSU (54,68%)	52,57%	first round win
Bjelovar	HDZ (27,28%)	38,13%	Dario Hrebak, HSLS (64.25%)	29.15%	runoff election
Buje	IDS (41,77%)	40,13%	Fabrizio Vižintin, IDS (49.54%)	41.58%	runoff election
Buzet	IDS, HSU (51,46%)	55,03%	Siniša Žulić, IDS (55,54%)	55,03%	first round win
Cres	HNS, SDP, PGS, HSS, HSU (29,04%)	58,20%	Kristijan Jurjanko, HNS (51.14%)	50.78%	runoff election
Crikvenica	HDZ, HSP AS, HSS, HSLS (46,44%)	42,62%	Damir Rukavina, HDZ (50,31%)	42,60%	first round win
Čabar	SDP (32,56%)	49,07%	Kristijan Rajšel, SDP (65.29%)	34.73%	runoff election
Čakovec	SDP, HSS, HSU, MDS, HL (43,03%)	43,22%	Stjepan Kovač, SDP (56,23%)	44,21%	first round win
Čazma	HSS (37,07%)	49,61%	Dinko Pirak, HSS (56,15%)	49,70%	first round win
Daruvar	HDZ, HSU, HSS, HSLS (34,66%)	48,22%	Damir Lneniček, HDZ (55.03%)	46.84%	runoff election
Delnice	Ind. (33,26%)	49,74%	Ivica Knežević, Ind. (52.09%)	40.94%	runoff election
Donja Stubica	SDP, HNS, HSU, HL (46,16%)	48,20%	Nikola Gospočić, SDP (58,50%)	48,35%	first round win
Donji Miholjac	Ind. (33,52%)	39,92%	Goran Aladić, Ind. (57.15%)	35.26%	runoff election
Drniš	HDZ (47,14%)	53,57%	Josip Begonja, HDZ (52,12%)	53,69%	first round win
Dubrovnik	HDZ (32,76%)	47,63%	Mato Franković, HDZ (58.45%)	39.77%	runoff election
Duga Resa	HDZ (30,45%)	51,16%	Tomislav Boljar, HSS (60,99%)	47.55%	runoff election
Dugo Selo	HDZ (32,33%)	36,08%	Nenad Panian, HNS (51.14%)	30.73%	runoff election
Đakovo	HDZ (38,92%)	44,34%	Marin Mandarić, HDZ (50.93%)	47.52%	runoff election
Đurđevac	Ind. (64,74%)	51,83%	Zlatko Mađeruh, Ind. (60,19%)	51,83%	first round win
Garešnica	HDZ, HSLS (43,62%)	43,42%	Josip Bilandžija, HDZ (55,27%)	43,42%	first round win
Glina	HDZ (45,72%)	45,83%	Stjepan Kostanjević, HDZ (53,81%)	45,89%	first round win
Gospić	HDZ, HSS, HSP AS (48,32%)	61,56	Karlo Starčević, HSP (50.14%)	66.68%	runoff election
Grubišno Polje	HDZ (45,20%)	53,00%	Zlatko Mađeruh, HDZ (54,11%)	53,11%	first round win
Hrvatska Kostajnica	HDZ (59,64%)	59,59%	Dalibor Bišćan, HDZ (62,29%)	59,94%	first round win
Hvar	HDZ (27,46%)	48,36%	Rikardo Novak, Ind. (52.73%)	43.31%	runoff election
Ilok	HDZ, HSLS (59,64%)	49,43%	Marina Budimir, Ind. (58.65%)	46.48%	runoff election
Imotski	HDZ, HSS, HSP AS, BUZ (50,68%)	51,92%	Ivan Budalić, HDZ (52.17%)	61.18%	runoff election
Ivanec	HNS, HSU (41,28%)	48,36%	Milorad Batinić, HNS (51,26%)	48,36%	first round win
Ivanić-Grad	HDZ, HSLS, NS-R (42,38%)	45,70%	Javor Bojan Leš, HDZ (58,94%)	45,70	first round win
Jastrebarsko	SDP, HNS, HSU (45,74%)	55,01%	Zvonimir Novosel, SDP (54,64%)	55,01%	first round win
Karlovac	HDZ, HSLS (39,69%)	44,33%	Damir Mandić, HDZ (52.82%)	33.63%	runoff election
Kastav	HNS, SDP, PGS, HSS, HSU, ARS (41,93%)	37,76%	Matej Mostarac, SDP (50.07%)	31.90%	runoff election
Kaštela	HDZ, HSS (48,26%)	32,42%	Denis Ivanović, HDZ (55,04%)	32,43%	first round win
Klanjec	SDP, ZDS, HNS, HSU, HL (53,63%)	56,03%	Zlatko Brlek, SDP (56,19%)	56,03%	first round win
Knin	HDZ (40,06%)	48,91%	Marko Jelić, Ind. (58.65%)	56.55%	runoff election
Komiža	SDP, HSS, HNS, (47,98%)	46,49%	Tonka Ivčević, SDP (61,19%)	46,49%	first round win
Koprivnica	SDP, HSS, HNS, HSU (46,84%)	40,91%	Mišel Jakšić, SDP (59.24%)	38.34%	runoff election
Korčula	HDZ, HSS, HSP AS, HSLS (43,40%)	60,91%	Andrija Fabris, HDZ (54,70%)	60,90%	first round win
Kraljevica	HDZ, HSLS (52,24%)	55,29%	Dalibor Čandrlić, HDZ (52,86%)	55,34%	first round win
Krapina	HDZ, A-HSS 1904, HSS, ZDS (51,84%)	58,48%	Zoran Gregurović, HDZ, (58,63%)	58,47%	first round win
Križevci	Ind. (32,59%)	44,36%	Mario Rajn, Ind. (61.58%)	48.42%	runoff election
Krk	PGS, SDP, HNS (58,25%)	32,66%	Darijo Vasilić, PGS (85,97%)	32,63%	first round win
Kutina	HDZ, HSP, HSP AS, HSLS, HSU (38,76%)	44,70%	Zlatko Bbaić, HDZ (49.56%)	45.33%	runoff election
Kutjevo	HDZ, HDSSB, HSS (72,46%)	38,43%	Josip Budimir, HDZ (77,85%)	38,43%	first round win
Labin	IDS, HNS, HSU (49,81%)	45,09%	Valter Glavičić, IDS (59,17%)	45,09%	first round win
Lepoglava	HNS, SDP, HSU (43,41%)	42,80%	Marijan Škvarić, HNS (51.69%)	42.30%	runoff election
Lipik	HDZ (64,17%)	49,02%	Vinko Kasana, HDZ (77,55%)	49,19%	first round win
Ludbreg	SDP, HNS, HSU, HL (50,82%)	48,47%	Dubravko Bilić, SDP (58,78%)	48,48%	first round win
Makarska	HDZ (38,33%)	43,37%	Jure Brkan, HDZ (50.88%)	42.55%	runoff election
Mali Lošinj	HDZ, HRAST, HSS, HKDU, SU (36,02%)	49,21%	Ana Kučić, HDZ (50,79%)	49,19%	first round win
Metković	MOST (40,65%)	65,38%	Dalibor Milan, HDZ (49.83%)	67.10%	runoff election
Mursko Središće	HDZ, HSS, HDS, HSLS (50,38%)	43,17%	Dražen Srpak, HDZ (62,11%)	43,23%	first round win
Našice	HDZ (52,74%)	41,55%	Josip Miletić, HDZ (50,68%)	41,55%	first round win
Nin	HDZ (52,52%)	53,45%	Emil Ćurko, HDZ (58,24%)	53,48%	first round win
Nova Gradiška	SDP, HL (50,76%)	46,00%	Vinko Grgić, SDP (62,04%)	46,01%	first round win
Novalja	Ind. (51,59%)	65,07%	Ante Dabo, Ind. (57,93%)	65,12%	first round win
Novi Marof	HDZ, HSS, HSU (58,11%)	48,33%	Siniša Jenkač, HDZ (60,74%)	48,35%	first round win
Novi Vinodolski	HDZ, HSS (56,10%)	54,79%	Velimir Piškulić, HDZ (58,11%)	54,79%	first round win
Novigrad	IDS (70,59%)	41,26%	Ante Milos, IDS (91,79%)	41,26%	first round win
Novska	HDZ, HSS, (55,58%)	48,51%	Marin Piletić, HDZ (53,28%)	49,03%	first round win
Obrovac	HDZ (42,04%)	45,42%	Ante Župan, HDZ (57,66%)	45,40%	first round win
Ogulin	HDZ, HSS, HSLS, HSU (37,27%)	52,53%	Dalibor Domitrović, SDP (49.75%)	47.65%	runoff election
Omiš	Ind. (45,17%)	49,59%	Ivo Tomasović, Ind. (53,81%)	49,60%	first round win
Opatija	SDP, HNS, IDS, HSU, PGS, NS-R, HSS (36,49%)	47,04%	Ivo Dujmić, Ind. (45.95%)	44.75%	runoff election
Opuzen	HDZ, HSLS (50,89%)	63,32%	Ivo Mihaljević, HDZ (52,34%)	63,32%	first round win
Orahovica	HDZ (39,26%)	62,03%	Ana-Marija Petin, HSS (49.87%)	62.49%	runoff election
Oroslavje	HDZ, HSS BR, HSP AS, ZS (37,66%)	48,50%	Emil Gredičak, HDZ (56.46%)	49.29%	runoff election
Osijek	SDP, HNS, HSS, ANU (23,23%)	40,65%	Ivan Vrkić, Ind. (62.74%)	34.33%	runoff election
Otočac	HDZ, HSU, HSP, HSP AS, HSLS (52,84%)	60,38%	Stjepan Kostelac, Ind. (49,52%	60,43%	first round win
Otok	HDZ, HSS, HSP AS (57,73%)	49,55%	Josip Šarić, HDZ (57,69%)	49,59%	first round win
Ozalj	HDZ (37,72%)	51,33%	Gordana Lipšinić, HDZ (55.06%)	48.69%	runoff election
Pag	HDZ (25,94%)	65,54%	Ante Fabijanić, MODES (50.60%)	63.70%	runoff election
Pakrac	HDZ (53,79%)	41,51%	Anamarija Blažević, HDZ (62,48%)	41,68%	first round win
Pazin	IDS, HSU, HNS (46,53%)	47,37%	Renato Krulčić, IDS (58.44%)	36.79%	runoff election
Petrinja	HDZ, HSP, HSP AS, HSLS, HKS, UDU (41,35%)	44,50%	Renato Krulčić, NS-R (53.07%)	46.37%	runoff election
Pleternica	HDZ, HSU (48,60%)	53,78%	Anotnija Jozić, HDZ (50,69%)	53,90%	first round win
Ploče	HDZ, HSLS (40,04%)	65,36%	Mišo Krstičević, SDP (53.95%)	69.31%	runoff election
Popovača	HDZ (30,13%)	41,73%	Josip Mišković, HDZ (57,75%)	41,74%	first round win
Poreč	IDS (47,93%)	46,99%	Loris Peršurić, IDS (57,31%)	46,99%	first round win
Požega	HDZ, HSU (45,55%)	51,21%	Darko Puljašić, HDZ (61.49%)	41.63	runoff election
Pregrada	SDP, ZS, HL (65,81%)	49,44%	Marko Vešligaj, SDP (71,46%)	49,46%	first round win
Prelog	HDZ, HSS (57,64%)	49,37%	Ljubomir Kolarek, HDZ (63,58%)	49,57	first round win
Pula	IDS, HNS, ISU, Zeleni (48,90%)	37,31%	Boris Miletić, IDS (51,83%)	37,32%	first round win
Rab	HDZ, HSS, RPS (46,12%)	57,91%	Nikola Grgurić, HDZ (56,58%)	57,91%	first round win
Rijeka	SDP, PGS, HSU, IDS, HL, SDSS, HSS (37,78%)	36,63%	Vojko Obersnel, SDP (55.59%)	28.42%	runoff election
Rovinj	IDS (54,65%)	38,68%	Marko Paliaga, IDS (62,25%)	38,68%	first round win
Samobor	HSS, SDP (52,76%)	43,37%	Krešo Beljak, HSS (62,92%)	43,58%	first round win
Senj	HDZ, HSP AS, HSU, NS-R (51,36%)	63,58%	Sanjin Rukavina, HDZ (63.07%)	59.89%	runoff election
Sinj	HDZ (32,74%)	48,00%	Kristina Križanac, Ind. (50.37%)	47.91%	runoff election
Sisak	SDP, HL, HSS BR (31,71%)	47,10%	Kristina Ikić Baniček, SDP (55.80%)	43.20%	runoff election
Skradin	HDZ (49,36%)	42,12%	Antonijo Brajković, HDZ (63,68%)	41,98%	first round win
Slatina	HDZ, HSP, HSLS, SU (40,82%%)	45,35%	Denis Ostrošić, SDP (53.47%)	43.71%	runoff election
Slavonski Brod	Ind. (34,97%)	39,10%	Mirko Duspara, Ind. (54.17%)	39.46%	runoff election
Slunj	HDZ (59,23%)	42,01%	Jure Katić, HDZ (60,79%)	42,01%	first round win
Solin	HDZ, HČSP, HDS, HSU (55,07%)	44,36%	Dalibor Ninčević, HDZ (57,14%)	44,35%	first round win
Split	HDZ, HSLS, HSS (25,31%)	45,50%	Andro Krstulović Opara, HDZ (46.19%)	38.07%	runoff election
Stari Grad	HDZ (38,06%)	53,51%	Antonio Škarpa, Ind. (49,65%)	63,35%	third round election
Supetar	SDP, HSU (48,96%)	56,82%	Ivana Marković, SDP (61,14%)	56,82%	first round win
Sveta Nedelja	HDZ (26,54%)	47,08%	Dario Zurovec, Ind. (57.73%)	43.43%	runoff election
Sveti Ivan Zelina	HDZ, HSLS, HSU (24,46%)	44,25%	Hrvoje Košćec, HNS (53.69%)	42.89%	runoff election
Šibenik	HDZ (45,62%)	43,20%	Željko Burić, HDZ (69.78%)	30.70%	runoff election
Trilj	HDZ, HDS (68,36%)	42,88%	Ivan Šipić, HDZ (79,99%)	42,84%	first round win
Trogir	HDZ, HSP (40,44%)	48,12%	Ante Bilić, SDP (49.06%)	47.51%	runoff election
Umag	SDP, HSU, HNS, SDA, SDSS (37,82%)	42,82%	Vili Bassanese, SDP (52,38%)	42,82%	first round win
Valpovo	HDZ, HSS (37,26%)	48,63%	Matko Šutalo, Ind. (54.80%)	53.85%	runoff election
Varaždin	Ind. (28,92%)	49,30%	Ivan Čehok, Ind. (68.50%)	41.56%	runoff election
Varaždinske Toplice	HDZ, HSLS (51,79%)	54,64%	Deagica Ratković, HDZ (56,79%)	54,70%	first round win
Velika Gorica	HDZ, HSLS, HSU (39,47%)	41,20%	Dražen Barišić, HDZ (61.11%)	29.29%	runoff election
Vinkovci	HDZ, HSU, BUZ (41,09%)	45,05%	Ivan Bosančić, HDZ (51.10%)	40.17%	runoff election
Virovitica	HDZ, HSLS, HSP AS (57,51%)	46,88%	Ivica Kirin, HDZ (60,50%)	46,89%	first round win
Vis	HDZ (39,26%)	60,13%	Ivo Radica, HDZ (51,71%)	60,13%	first round win
Vodice	HDZ (46,30%)	46,76%	Nelka Tomić, HDZ (56.01%)	45.63%	runoff election
Vodnjan	IDS, ISU, HNS (68,28%)	38,47%	Klaudio Vitasović, IDS (63,22%)	38,49%	first round win
Vrbovec	SDP, HL (27,65%)	51,08%	Denis Kralj, SDP (63.51%)	48.97%	runoff election
Vrbovsko	Ind. (36,18%)	51,88%	Dražen Mufić, Ind. (53,76%)	52,04%	first round win
Vrgorac	NLM (44,71%)	67,29%	Ante Pranić, NLM (60,68%)	67,33%	first round win
Vrlika	HDZ (51,71%)	60,82%	Jure Plazonić, HDZ (54.51%)	61.91%	first round win
Vukovar	HDZ, HKS (54,23%)	41,14%	Ivan Penava, HDZ (61,72%)	41,18%	first round win
Zabok	SDP, HSU, HNS, HL, HSS BR (43,57%)	52,67%	Ivan Hanžek, SDP (55,16%)	52,71%	first round win
Zadar	HDZ, HSP AS, HSU, HRAST, NS-R (46,47%)	38,90%	Branko Dukić, HDZ (51,20%)	38,91	first round win
Zaprešić	HDZ, HSS, HSU, BM 365, HSLS (38,34%)	41,95%	Željko Turk, HDZ (57.02%)	33.00%	runoff election
Zlatar	SDP, HSU, HNS, HL (59,17%)	51,08%	Jasenka Auguštan-Pentek, SDP (74,19%)	44,23%	first round win
Županja	HDZ (50,82%)	36,44%	Davor Miličević, HDZ (54,19%)	36,45	first round win

== See also ==
- 2017 Zagreb local elections
- 2017 Split local elections
- 2017 Rijeka local elections
