= List of prefects of Krapina-Zagorje County =

This is a list of prefects of Krapina-Zagorje County.

== Prefects of Krapina-Zagorje County (1993–present) ==
Croatian Democratic Union (HDZ)
Croatian Peasant Party (HSS)
Social Democratic Party of Croatia (SDP)

No.	Portrait	Name (Born–Died)	Term of Office		Party
1		Franjo Kajfež (1936–2004)	4 May 1993	10 February 1996	HDZ
2		Želimir Hitrec (1942–)	10 February 1996	24 July 2001	HDZ
3		Vlasta Hubicki (1953–)	24 July 2001	13 July 2007	HSS
4		Sonja Borovčak (1947–)	13 July 2007	8 June 2009	SDP
5		Siniša Hajdaš Dončić (1974–)	8 June 2009	18 April 2012	SDP
—		Sonja Borovčak (1947–); Acting Prefect	18 April 2012	3 June 2013	SDP
6		Željko Kolar (1967–)	3 June 2013	Incumbent	SDP

== See also ==
- Krapina-Zagorje County
