= Iva Rinčić =

Croatian politician

Mayor of Rijeka
- Incumbent
- Assumed office 6 June 2025
- Preceded by: Marko Filipović

Personal details
- Born: 16 July 1975 (age 51) Rijeka, SR Croatia, SFR Yugoslavia
- Party: Independent
- Spouse: Amir Muzur
- Children: 1
- Education: University of Zagreb
- Website: ivarincic.hr

Iva Rinčić (born 16 July 1975) is a Croatian politician serving as mayor of Rijeka since 2025. She previously served in the Primorje-Gorski Kotar County Assembly and was a councilor in the Rijeka City Council.

== Biography ==
Iva Rinčić was born in 1975 in Rijeka where she graduated from Sušak high school. She studied sociology and Croatian culture at the Faculty of Croatian Studies, completed her postgraduate studies at the Faculty of Political Science, and completed her doctoral studies at the Faculty of Philosophy all at the University of Zagreb.

Her first job was in 2001 at GONG, as a coordinator of non-partisan observers for the 2001 Croatian local elections. Since 2001, she has been working at the University of Rijeka, at the Faculty of Medicine and the Faculty of Health Studies. From 2013 to 2021, she was the director of the University of Rijeka Foundation and launched a number of projects. In December 2024, she was elected president of the Croatian Bioethics Society becoming the first woman to hold that position.

== Political career ==
She began her political career at the 2021 Croatian local elections when she ran for multiple positions. First she ran for the Rijeka City Council under the independent list of Davor Štimac and was among the 4 councilors elected from the list. She was also a candidate for prefect of Primorje-Gorski Kotar County but won only 9.55% of the vote and did not advance into the second round. Her independent list won 3 seats in the Primorje-Gorski Kotar County Assembly.

In the 2025 Croatian local elections she ran for mayor of Rijeka as an independent candidate backed by AM, Unija, Centar, HSU, Fokus and Alternativa. She won 41.07% of the vote and advanced into the second round against the incumbent mayor Marko Filipović. Rinčić won the second round with 64.96% of the vote and officially took power on 6 June 2025.

== Personal life ==
Rinčić is married to former mayor of Opatija Amir Muzur who is her second husband. Her first husband, with whom she had a son, died from cancer.
