= Franjo Krežma Concert Hall =

Concert hall in Osijek, Croatia

- Interactive map of Franjo Krežma Concert Hall
- Address: 2A knez Trpimir Street
- Location: Osijek, Croatia
- Coordinates: 45°33′21.481″N 18°41′42.428″E

Construction
- Built: 2024
- Opened: 27 September 2024
- Construction cost: € 1,7 million

Franjo Krežma Concert Hall (Croatian: Koncertna dvorana Franjo Krežma) is the first concert hall in Osijek, situated inside Cultural Center Osijek.

The size of the hall itself is 1000 m^{2} with a 400 seat capacity. It is the most modern concert hall in Croatia and the second largest concert hall in the country after Vatroslav Lisinski Concert Hall in Zagreb. It is named after Croatian violinist and composer Franjo Krežma.

It is expected that its opening will make Osijek a regional center for classical music. The hall will house cultural and art events which previously could not be organized in Osijek.

The total cost of construction was € 1,7 million. It was financed by the Croatian Ministry of Culture and Media, which contributed with € 930.000, together with the Ministry of Regional Development and EU Funds, which contributed € 770.000.
