= Suzana Jašić =

Croatian politician and activist (born 1973)

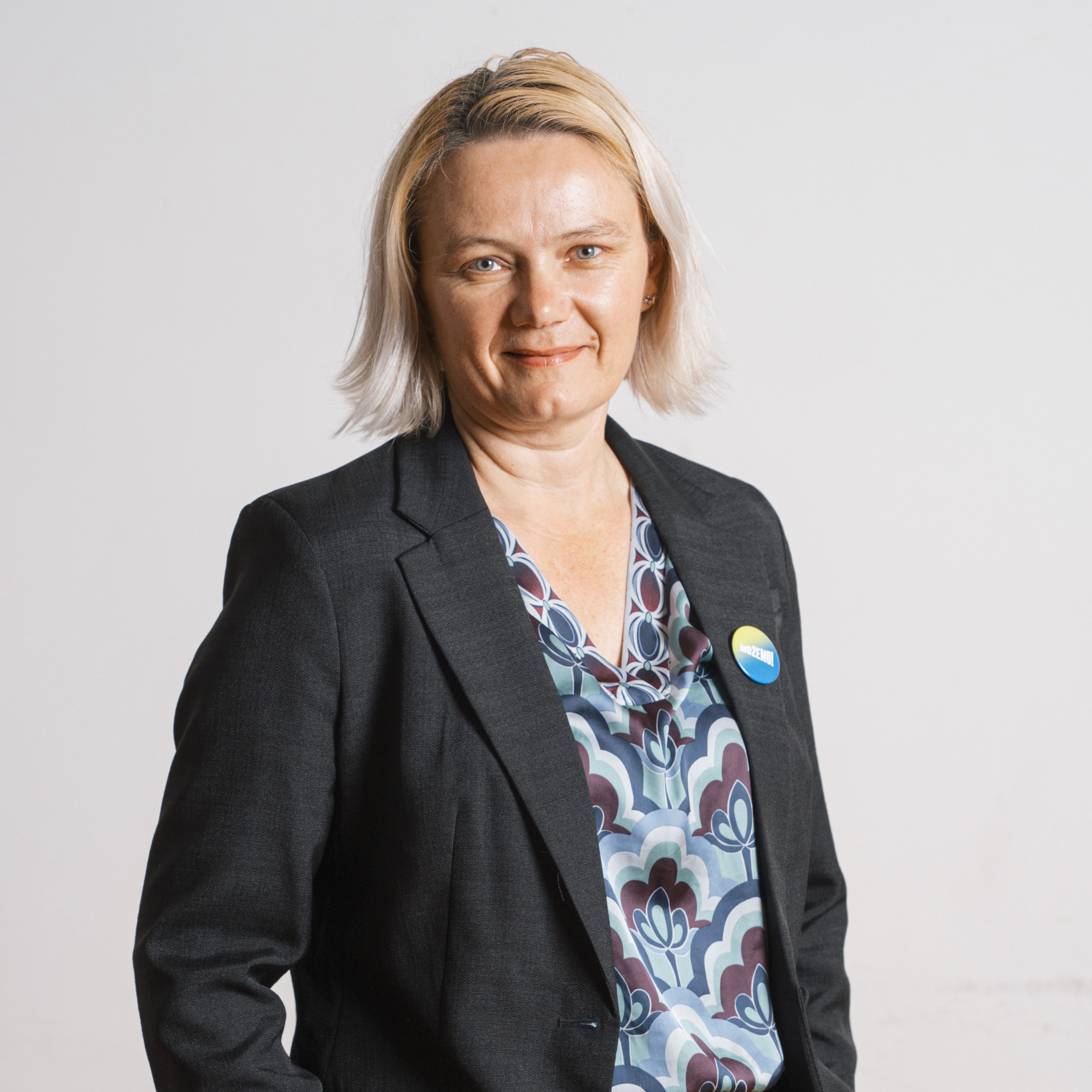

Mayor of Pazin
- Incumbent
- Assumed office 7 June 2021
- Preceded by: Renato Krulčić
- Constituency: Electoral district VIII

Personal details
- Born: 7 July 1973 (age 53) Pazin, SR Croatia, SFR Yugoslavia
- Party: We Can! (2019–present)
- Education: University of Zagreb (LL.B.)

Suzana Jašić (born 7 July 1973, in Pazin, Croatia) is a Croatian politician and civil rights activist and good governance expert/consultant who is serving as a mayor of Pazin since 2021 and has been re-elected in 2025. She is a member of the green-left political platform We Can!.

She was studying at the Faculty of Political Science in Zagreb, where she was active in student organizations. In 1997. she was a co-founder of civil society organization for election supervision GONG, which she leads from 1999 and helped setup international network of similar organizations called ENEMO. She worked in the development of civil society, advocating for public access to information, against corruption and was an advisor for similar projects in multiple countries in Eastern Europe. From 2003 to 2009 she is a member of Croatian Radiotelevision's Program Council where she was advocating for transparency, public content and freedom of media and support for journalists. In 2009 she left leadership position in GONG to move back to Pazin and implements their project on Budget supervision "Pazi(n), proračun". As of 2016 she is working as independent consultant for projects and evaluation of EU projects. From 2017 to 2021 she was an active member of the City council of Pazin, informing public and engaging with it. In 2021 she got elected and in 2025 re-elected as the mayor of Pazin.
