= Ivan Radić =

Croatian politician

Mayor of Osijek
- Incumbent
- Assumed office 4 June 2021
- Preceded by: Ivan Vrkić

Member of the Croatian Parliament
- Incumbent
- Assumed office 22 July 2020
- Prime Minister: Andrej Plenković
- Constituency: 4th electoral district
- In office 28 December 2015 – 14 October 2016
- Prime Minister: Tihomir Orešković; Zoran Milanović
- Constituency: 4th electoral district

Personal details
- Born: 15 June 1987 (age 39) Osijek, SR Croatia, SFR Yugoslavia
- Party: Croatian Democratic Union
- Spouse: Iva Kovačević Radić (m. 2018)
- Children: 1
- Education: University of Osijek
- Website: ivanradic.hr

Ivan Radić (born 15 June 1987) is a Croatian politician and economist serving as the 49th mayor of Osijek since 2021 and as a representative in the Croatian Parliament since 2020. He was also a member of parliament from 2015 to 2016. Radić is a member of the presidency of the Croatian Democratic Union.

== Biography ==
Ivan Radić was born in Osijek on June 15, 1987, where he attended the Vladimir Becić Elementary School and then the Science and Mathematics High School. In 2017, he completed his undergraduate studies at the Faculty of Civil Engineering in Osijek while continuing to work at a construction company. In the meantime, he also graduated from the Faculty of Economics in Osijek and he is currently pursuing a doctoral degree in European studies.

== Political career ==
He joined the Croatian Democratic Union when he was around 20 years old. In the 2015 Croatian parliamentary election he ran as a candidate of the Patriotic Coalition and won a seat in the Croatian Parliament. The coalition won the election with 34.64% of the vote and gained 59 seats in parliament with HDZ itself gaining 50 seats. HDZ would go on to create a government with Most. During this term in parliament Radić served as a member of the Committee on Human and National Minority Rights, Physical Planning and Construction Committee and Petitions and Appeals Committee. The government would collapse in June 2016 and a new election was called in which Radić was not a candidate.

In 2017 he was elected as the president of the Osijek HDZ, beating his opponent, Domagoj Mikulić, by a vote of 708-587.

He ran in the 2020 Croatian parliamentary election and once again won a seat in parliament. The HDZ-led coalition won the election with 37.26% of the vote and formed a cabinet with the SDSS. During this term he served as a member of the Petitions and Appeals Committee, Credentials and Privileges Commission, National Council for Water from among the ranks of Members of Parliament and as Deputy Chairperson of the National Council for Monitoring Anti-Corruption Strategy Implementation. From 20 January 2023 to 28 September 2023 he took a break from parliament and his substitute was Goran Ivanović.

He once again ran for parliament in the 2024 Croatian parliamentary election and won a seat. The HDZ-led coalition once again won the election with 34.42% of the vote and created a government with the Homeland Movement. Radić is a member of the parliamental Petitions and Appeals Committee. In 2024 he also became a member of the Presidency of the Croatian Democratic Union.

=== Mayor of Osijek ===
In the 2021 Osijek local elections he ran for mayor of Osijek and won 38.69% of the vote in the first round. He advanced into the second round against Berislav Mlinarević (DP, Most) and won with 62.69% of the vote. Radić officially became mayor on June 4, 2021.

The HDZ-led coalition won 14 seats in the Osijek City Council and created a majority with Power of Slavonia and Baranja and HNS. Vladimir Ham (HNS) was elected president of the City Council.

Radić's first act in office was to carry out aerial spraying against mosquitoes in Osijek, to prevent potential mosquito infestations. In July Radić decided to award the best Osijek high school graduates with a thousand kuna each.

In November 2021, he signed a contract for the execution of works worth 54.4 million kuna, which included the leveling of the road under the Osijek-Zagreb railway line, the construction of two bridges - a road and a railway, as well as a road under the bridges, and the construction of a pedestrian and bicycle path, public lighting and storm drainage.

In February 2022, he asked the City Council to reduce kindergarten prices due to the worsening epidemiological situation of COVID-19. The City Council accepted the proposal.

In January 2023, he overturned the decision of the Supervisory Board of the city's public transport company to increase public transport ticket prices. Krešimir Čabaj, president of the Homeland Movement of Osijek-Baranja County, called this decision a PR spin by HDZ.

After the mayor of Pula, Filip Zoričić, canceled a turbo-folk concert in Pula, which was supposed to feature Duško Kuliš, Dragan Kojić Keba, Ana Bekuta and Zorana Mićanović, he suggested that the concert should be held in the Zrinjevac Sport Hall in Osijek. Radić responded by saying that "the controversial concert will not take place in the city of Osijek".

In March 2023, Radić met with the mayors of Zagreb, Split, and Rijeka in Zagreb to launch the “4 Cities Initiative” – a platform for cooperation on topics of common interest between the four largest Croatian cities. In June, he donated 4,000 square meters of land for the construction of a new space for the State Archives. In October, Osijek was the only one among large Croatian cities that did not have to pay a fine because the separate waste collection rate exceeded 50 percent in 2022. In November 2023, Radić announced a plan to build a central kitchen for preschoolers and elementary school children with a capacity of 15,000 meals per day.

After the Croatian government decided to abolish the surtax in 2024, it gave municipalities and cities the choice of whether to leave the income tax rate the same or increase it to compensate for the loss. Radić decided not to increase the income tax rate which meant that salaries for all Osijek residents increased significantly.

In February 2024, Osijek agreed to pay the largest compensation in its history of 3.9 million euros to the Austrian companies Saubermacher Dienstleistungs AG and Strabag. In September 2024, the Franjo Krežma Concert Hall, worth around 1.7 million euros, opened in the Osijek Cultural Center. Radić said that "we are witnessing a historic moment for Osijek".

In November 2024, Radić announced that he would not renew the parking concession contract, which was set to expire on December 31. This meant that for the first time in history, the City of Osijek would take over the management of its parking spaces.

On March 7, 2025, the first new tram since 1982 arrived in Osijek. State Secretary of the Ministry of Maritime Affairs, Transport and Infrastructure, Žarko Tušek, stated that over the past seven years, 127 million euros from EU funds have been invested in Osijek's transport infrastructure. In March, Osijek also introduced free taxi transportation for oncology patients from the city area, from their home address to the Oncology Clinic of the Osijek Clinical Hospital Center.

In the 2025 Osijek local elections Radić once again ran as a candidate of the HDZ-led coalition. He won by a landslide in the first round with 70.95% of the vote.

== Personal life ==
He is married to Iva Kovačević Radić who is a lawyer. They married in 2018 and have a son, Nikša, who was born in 2021.

He is a fan of NK Osijek.

== See also ==
- List of mayors of Osijek
- List of members of the Sabor, 2015–2016
- List of members of the Sabor, 2020–2024
- List of members of the Sabor, 2024–
