= Vojko Obersnel =

Croatian politician

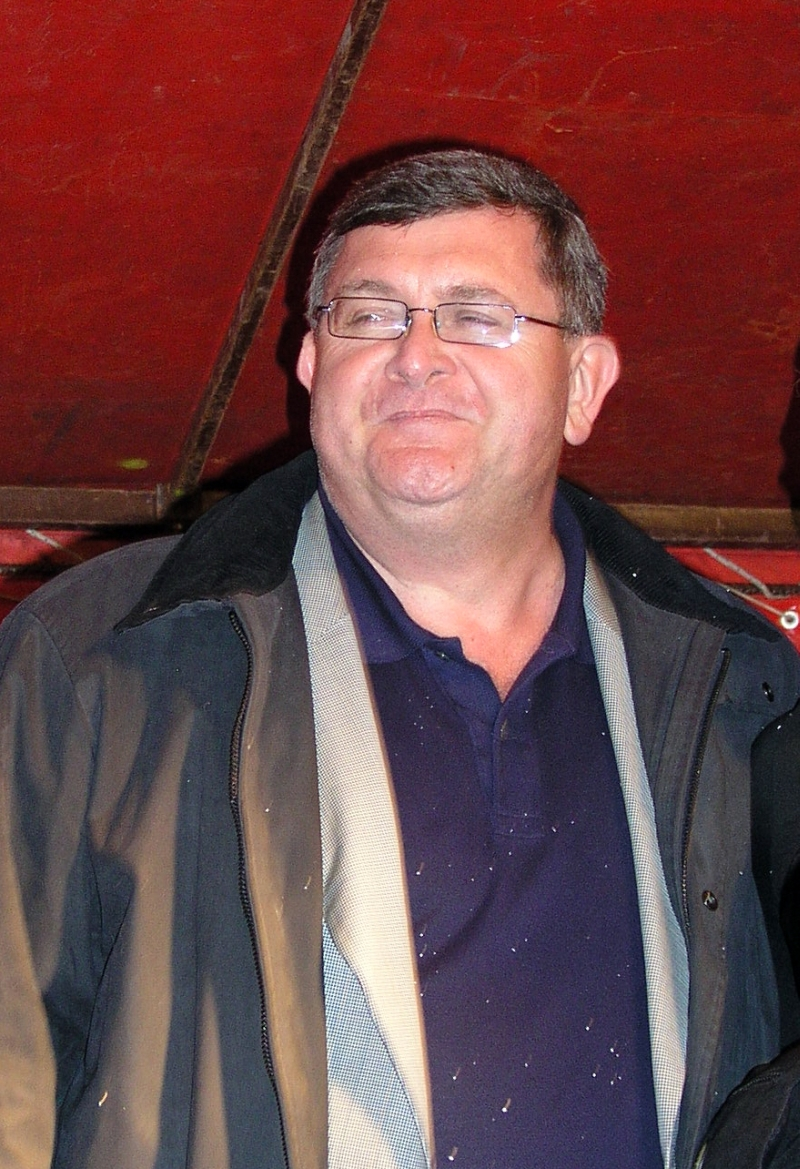

Mayor of Rijeka
- In office 2 March 2000 – 7 June 2021
- Deputy: Marko Filipović; Nikola Ivaniš
- Preceded by: Slavko Linić
- Succeeded by: Marko Filipović

Personal details
- Born: 25 March 1957 (age 69) Rijeka, PR Croatia, FPR Yugoslavia
- Party: SDP (1990–present)
- Spouse: Branka Obersnel (m. 1983)
- Children: 1
- Education: University of Zagreb
- Occupation: Politician
- Profession: Biology

Vojko Obersnel (born 25 March 1957) is a Croatian politician who served as Mayor of Rijeka from 2000 to 2021.

== Early life ==
Obersnel was born in Rijeka, where he attended primary school and gymnasium. As a child, he was not enrolled in a kindergarten program and spent most of his time with his grandparents in Bribir. Vojko was strongly influenced by scouts movement. During his university, studies he spent some time traveling across Yugoslavia. In 1980, he graduated from the Zagreb Faculty of Science He holds a M.Sc. in medicine (field of genetics). From 1982 to 1997, he worked at the Rijeka Faculty of Medicine, where he taught biology and medical genetics. He also engaged in scientific and research work in the field of medical genetics and ecotoxicology, and performed diagnostics in a cytogenetic laboratory.

In 1983, he married Branka Obersnel, a pediatrician. They have a son, Ognjen, born in 1984, who is an economist.

Obersenel's father was born in Maribor and played for NK Maribor.

== Political career ==
Obersnel has been a member of the Social Democratic Party (SDP) since 1990. From 1997 to 2000, he was a member of the executive council of the City of Rijeka, and head of the Department of Health and Social Welfare. During that period, Rijeka significantly expanded its social programs which encompassed many different forms of assistance for citizens in need. Obersnel succeeded in getting the World Health Organization to include Rijeka on one of its projects, which later made it possible for the city to join the European National Healthy Cities Network.

=== Mayor of Rijeka (2000–2021) ===
Obersnel became the mayor of Rijeka on 2 March 2000, after former mayor Slavko Linić had been elected the new deputy prime minister in Ivica Račan's government. Obersnel then won the next five local elections in his own right - in 2001, 2005, 2009, 2013, and 2017. On 6 November 2020, he announced he would not be running in the next election. He retired on 7 June 2021, at the end of his sixth consecutive term in office.

Political offices
Preceded by Slavko Linić	Mayor of Rijeka; 2000–present	Incumbent
