= Independent Youth List =

Political party in Croatia

Independent Youth List Nezavisna lista mladih
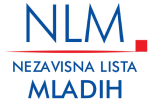
- Abbreviation: NLM
- President: Petar Maretić
- Deputy presidents: Ante Pranić; Petra Radić
- Founded: 18 April 2016
- Headquarters: Kralja Zvonimira 75, Solin
- Ideology: Regionalism; Youth politics
- Political position: Centre-right
- Colours: Blue Red
- Sabor: 0 / 151
- European Parliament: 0 / 12
- County Prefects: 0 / 21
- Mayors: 2 / 128

Website
- nlm.hr

Independent Youth List (Croatian: Nezavisna lista mladih, NLM) is a political party in Croatia. It was founded in 2016 by Ante Pranić, mayor of Vrgorac. Its headquarters are in Solin.

The party is active mostly in Split-Dalmatia County where it has two assembly members. It runs local chapters in Solin, Drniš, Vrgorac and Dicmo. The party's incumbent president Petar Maretić is the president of Dicmo municipality, while NLM also holds the position of mayor of Vrgorac. Ante Pranić became mayor in 2014, defeating the ruling Croatian Democratic Union in the town for the first time in 23 years.

The party was a part of The Bridge of Independent Lists platform in the 2016 Croatian parliamentary election. NLM didn't win a seat but Ante Pranić entered Sabor in 2017 as a replacement for Ivan Kovačić. Later in the Sabor's 9th term, NLM formed a deputy club as two more MPs joined the party.
