= List of mayors of Osijek =

Mayor of the City of Osijek
- Gradonačelnik Osijeka
- Incumbent; Ivan Radić since 30 May 2021
- Appointer: Osijek City Council
- Term length: 4 years, unlimited number of renewals
- Inaugural holder: Franjo Blažić
- Formation: 1786
- Website: http://www.osijek.hr/beta/index.php/eng/content/view/full/3337

This is a list of people who have served as mayor or president of the city council of the city of Osijek, in Croatia.

#	Term	Mayor	Party
1	1786–1788	Franjo Blažić	
2	1789–1790	Antun Mrazović	
3	1791–1804	Franjo Broschan	
4	1809–1811	Ivan Baranyai	
5	1811–1813	Aleksandar Chavrak	
6	1813–1814	Karlo Zengewall	
7	1815–1821	Stjepan Moslavac	
8	1822–1831	Josip Krmpotić	
9	1831–1835	Josip Poszanyi	
10	1835–1848	Alojz Schmidt	
11	1848–1850	Demetar Vuković	
12	1850–1853	Baltazar Čalogović	
13	1853–1868	Alojz Schmidt	
14	1868–1869	Antun Stojanović	
15	1869–1883	Nikola Živanović	
16	1884–1892	Fridrich Broschan	
17	1892–1895	Antun Rottar	
18	1895–1913	Konstantin Graff	
19	1914–1919	Antun Pinterović	
20	1920–1934	Vjekoslav Hengl	
21	1934–1935	Vlado Malin	
22	1935	Milovan Pinterović	
23	1935–1937	Dušan Radanović	
24	1937–1940	Jovan Božić	
25	1941	Josip Galovac	UHRO
26	1942–1945	Ivan Movrin	UHRO
27	1945–1947	Andrija Kocijanović	KPH
28	1947–1951	Slavko Čorak	KPH
29	1951–1955	Matija Bunjevac	SKH
30	1958–1963	Petar Zatezalo	SKH
31	1963–1965	Branko Runje	SKH
32	1965–1969	Milenko Radusinović	SKH
33	1969–1974	Jozo Petović	SKH
34	1974–1982	Ivica Fekete	SKH
35	1982–1983	Petar Anić	SKH
36	1983–1984	Milan Rajković	SKH
37	1984–1985	Željko Huber	SKH
38	1985–1986	Mirko Bojanić	SKH
39	1986–1988	Milutin Bede	SKH
40	1988–1990	Dragutin Badurina	SKH
41	1990–1992	Zlatko Kramarić	HSLS
42	1992–1993	Karlo Karačić	HDZ
43	1993–2005	Zlatko Kramarić	LS
44	2005–2008	Anto Đapić	HSP
45	2008–2009	Gordan Matković	HSP
46	2009	Anto Đapić	HSP
47	2009–2013	Krešimir Bubalo	HDSSB
48	2013–2021	Ivan Vrkić	Independent
49	2021–present	Ivan Radić	HDZ
