= 2001 Croatian local elections =

- 25 May 2001

Local elections were held in Croatia on 25 May 2001. It was the third time the country had held local elections since independence, and the first time since democratization.

Voting at 6,430 separate polling stations across Croatia for members of representative bodies of local and regional self-government units, the citizens elected members for a total of 423 municipal and 122 city councils, as well as members for 20 county assemblies, and the Zagreb City Assembly. At the time of these elections, Croatia had a total of 3,886,702 registered voters.

== Electoral system ==
Councilors of regional and local council were elected by a closed list proportional system. The electoral threshold was set at 5%. The number of councilors elected depended on the population of each constituency. Municipalities and towns up to with up to 3,000 inhabitants elected between 7 and 13 councilors, municipalities and towns up to 10,000 inhabitants elected between 9 and 15 councilors, municipalities and cities up to 30,000 inhabitants elected between 13 and 19 councilors, cities with over 30,000 inhabitants elected between 19 and 35 councilors, while the City of Zagreb elected 51 councilors. For county councils between 31 and 51 councilors were elected, with no connection to the number of inhabitants. In some constituencies the total number of seats differed slightly due special additional seats for national minorities which were assigned independently.

== Election results ==
=== Counties ===
Results of 2001 elections in Croatian counties
County	County council	
County	Plurality	Turnout
Bjelovar-Bilogora	HSS (29.71%)	50.33%
Brod-Posavina	HDZ (32.35%)	46.75%
Dubrovnik-Neretva	HDZ (28.60%)	54.20%
Istria	IDS (50.08%)	50.96%
Karlovac	HDZ (28.18%)	51.51%
Koprivnica-Križevci	HSS (27.36%)	47.10%
Krapina-Zagorje	HDZ (19.99%)	46.21%
Lika-Senj	HDZ (37.98%)	49.62%
Međimurje	SDP, HSU (19.94%)	43.22%
Osijek-Baranja	HDZ (23.48%)	50.75%
Požega-Slavonia	HDZ (26.38%)	55.47%
Primorje-Gorski Kotar	SDP, HSS, HSLS, HSU (29.89%)	42.67%
Sisak-Moslavina	HDZ, HPS, HKDU, DSU (26.62%)	48.52%
Split-Dalmatia	HDZ, HKDU, HČSP, HDRS, HDD, SHP (43.00%)	52.54%
Šibenik-Knin	HDZ (34.72%)	49.38%
Varaždin	HDZ (21.10%)	49.31%
Virovitica-Podravina	HDZ (23.56%)	47.12%
Vukovar-Syrmia	HDZ, HKDU (27.75%)	45.05%
Zadar	HDZ (38.85%)	45.03%
Zagreb County	HDZ (25.58%)	46.76%
City of Zagreb	SDP (26.62%)	39.79%
Source: State Electoral Committee

=== Cities ===
Results of 2001 elections in Croatian cities
	City Council	
City	Plurality	Turnout
Bakar	HDZ (18.59%)	47.15%
Beli Manastir	HDZ (28.38%)	59.62%
Belišće	HDZ (27.82%)	54.80%
Benkovac	HDZ (53.60%)	33.85%
Biograd na Moru	HSS (40.99%)	49.06%
Bjelovar	HSLS (30.70%)	47.10%
Buje	IDS (46.44%)	53.72%
Buzet	IDS (47.20%)	59.41%
Cres	HDZ (35.05%)	64.55%
Crikvenica	SDP, HSLS (32.37%)	37.00%
Čabar	HDZ (34.89%)	54.13%
Čakovec	SDP, HSU (27.30%)	41.85%
Čazma	HSS (40.69%)	60.11%
Daruvar	HDZ (22.82%)	44.52%
Delnice	PGS (26.68%)	52.45%
Donja Stubica	HSS (29.79%)	43.06%
Donji Miholjac	HDZ (21.66%)	52.82%
Drniš	HDZ (43.42%)	50.69%
Dubrovnik	HDZ (22.10%)	46.18%
Duga Resa	HSS (25.46%)	59.14%
Dugo Selo	HDZ (25.65%)	29.37%
Đakovo	HDZ (24.85%)	44.41%
Đurđevac	SDP (28.99%)	56.63%
Garešnica	SDP (28.20%)	46.18%
Glina	HDZ (43.03%)	45.88%
Gospić	HDZ (50.45%)	47.09%
Grubišno Polje	HDZ (29.86%)	48.04%
Hrvatska Kostajnica	HDZ (49.02%)	51.27%
Hvar	HDZ (27.47%)	58.23%
Ilok	HDZ (29.90%)	53.04%
Imotski	HDZ, HSP (46.12%)	48.72%
Ivanec	SDP (19.08%)	47.68%
Ivanić-Grad	SDP (27.22%)	39.79%
Jastrebarsko	HDZ (32.47%)	61.01%
Karlovac	SDP (19.96%)	51.35%
Kastav	SDP, HSS, LS (41.70%)	39.38%
Kaštela	HDZ (43.18%)	48.06%
Klanjec	HSLS (39.69%)	53.72%
Knin	HDZ (36.01%)	42.54%
Komiža	HSS (47.75%)	69.67%
Koprivnica	SDP (24.51%)	40.50%
Korčula	HDZ (31.47%)	62.18%
Kraljevica	SDP, PGS, HNS (47.25%)	49.82%
Krapina	HNS (24.06%)	42.45%
Križevci	HSS (34.91%)	43.22%
Krk	PGS, HNS, HSLS (48.55%)	43.50%
Kutina	HDZ (23.90%)	39.52%
Labin	IDS (44.27%)	44.40%
Lepoglava	HNS (30.34%)	36.78%
Lipik	HSS (30.91%)	42.23%
Ludbreg	SDP (26.11%)	50.74%
Makarska	SDP (39.13%)	50.00%
Mali Lošinj	PGS (22.85%)	52.54%
Metković	HDZ (48.26%)	51.79%
Mursko Središće	HSLS (39.55%)	39.69%
Našice	HDZ (24.91%)	54.72%
Nin	HSS, LS (48.29%)	54.81%
Nova Gradiška	HDZ (29.01%)	48.11%
Novalja	HDZ (47.49%)	66.84%
Novi Marof	HDZ (42.24%)	56.65%
Novi Vinodolski	SDP (35.43%)	49.37%
Novigrad	IDS (39.20%)	54.20%
Novska	HDZ (40.79%)	48.48%
Obrovac	Ind. (40.78%)	45.71%
Ogulin	HDZ (35.74%)	59.87%
Omiš	HDZ (36.19%)	56.40%
Opatija	IDS (30.72%)	44.15%
Opuzen	HDZ (41.18%)	62.15%
Orahovica	HDZ (19.32%)	52.86%
Oroslavje	HDZ (31.13%)	52.65%
Osijek	HDZ (17.72%)	46.45%
Otočac	HDZ (30.95%)	52.73%
Ozalj	HDZ (23.90%)	51.27%
Pag	SDP (20.30%)	62.14%
Pakrac	HDZ (35.96%)	44.36%
Pazin	IDS (34.14%)	53.03%
Petrinja	HSP (22.72%)	52.18%
Pleternica	HDZ (35.48%)	62.24%
Ploče	SDP (29.76%)	55.77%
Poreč	IDS (45.83%)	41.12%
Požega	HDZ, HKDU (27.98%)	53.58%
Pregrada	HDZ (28.75%)	35.77%
Prelog	HDZ (28.74%)	49.49%
Pula	IDS (31.58%)	48.72%
Rab	SDP (28.82%)	43.15%
Rijeka	SDP, HSS, HSU (27.96%)	37.16%
Rovinj	IDS (41.28%)	49.15%
Samobor	DC (22.35%)	44.58%
Senj	HDZ (29.53%)	49.31%
Sinj	HDZ (27.64%)	54.53%
Sisak	SDP (23.22%)	53.53%
Skradin	HDZ (47.14%)	47.98%
Slatina	HDZ (24.51%)	42.01%
Slavonski Brod	HDZ, HKDU, HPS (30.56%)	39.83%
Slunj	HDZ (29.90%)	45.97%
Solin	HDZ, HDRS (41.13%)	52.76%
Split	SDP, HSS, HSU, LS (27.98%)	51.02%
Stari Grad	HSS (26.73%)	61.92%
Supetar	SDP (36.68%)	52.55%
Sveti Ivan Zelina	HSS (26.22%)	56.59%
Šibenik	HDZ (30.66%)	48.64%
Trilj	HDZ (39.95%)	57.90%
Trogir	SDP (32.65%)	47.11%
Umag	IDS (46.74%)	42.98%
Valpovo	HDZ (30.13%)	56.97%
Varaždin	HSLS, HSU (24.49%)	49.28%
Varaždinske Toplice	HSLS (29.84%)	64.31%
Velika Gorica	HDZ, HKDU, HČSP, HPS (27.85%)	39.56%
Vinkovci	HDZ, HKDU (30.01%)	44.79%
Virovitica	SDP (17.00%)	44.27%
Vis	SDP (21.72%)	65.45%
Vodice	HDZ (32.25%)	52.58%
Vrbovec	HSS (31.95%)	48.35%
Vrbovsko	HDZ (27.95%)	53.00%
Vrgorac	HDZ (40.72%)	53.68%
Vrlika	HDZ (68.74%)	55.90%
Vukovar	HDZ (28.53%)	44.32%
Zabok	SDP, LS, HNS, HSU (38.84%)	57.18%
Zadar	HDZ (40.94%)	34.92%
Zaprešić	Ind. (27.04%)	39.61%
Zlatar	HDZ (28.66%)	40.35%
Županja	HDZ, HKDU (22.33%)	32.33%
Source: State Electoral Committee

== Elections in capital ==
- 2001 Zagreb local elections
