= GONG (organization) =

Organization in Croatia

GONG is a non-governmental organization from Croatia that oversees elections in Croatia.

They were formed in 1997 and the name GONG was an acronym of Građani organizirano nadgledaju glasanje meaning "Citizens organize to oversee voting", but in 2000 the organization changed its name to simply GONG. Prior to the local and the presidential elections in 1997, GONG was created at the initiative of the Coordination of organizations for the protection and promotion of human rights from across Croatia. However, the Election Commission of the Republic of Croatia did not allow GONG's observers access to the polling stations, saying their presence was not defined by the electoral law. The Organization for Security and Co-operation in Europe (OSCE) criticized the government for doing this and claiming it made the elections "free, but not fair". GONG and the Croatian Helsinki Committee appealed to the Croatian Constitutional Court, which responded positively the following year, after which they were allowed to monitor all later elections.

GONG conducts get out the vote campaigns and promotes transparency in political campaign funding.

The European Commission's Directorate-General for Enlargement's Civil Society Development conference recognized GONG as one of the main good governance and democratisation organizations in Croatia.
