= List of county prefects of Croatia =

This is a list of current prefects of counties of Croatia.

County	Current Prefect	Party
Bjelovar-Bilogora	Marko Marušić	Croatian Democratic Union
Brod-Posavina	Danijel Marušić	Croatian Democratic Union
Dubrovnik-Neretva	Blaž Pezo	Croatian Democratic Union
Istria	Boris Miletić	Independent
Karlovac	Martina Furdek-Hajdin	Croatian Democratic Union
Koprivnica-Križevci	Tomislav Golubić	Social Democratic Party of Croatia
Krapina-Zagorje	Željko Kolar	Social Democratic Party of Croatia
Lika-Senj	Ernest Petry	Croatian Democratic Union
Međimurje	Matija Posavec	Independent Platform of the North
Osijek-Baranja	Nataša Tramišak	Croatian Democratic Union
Požega-Slavonia	Antonija Jozić	Croatian Democratic Union
Primorje-Gorski Kotar	Ivica Lukanović	Social Democratic Party of Croatia
Šibenik-Knin	Paško Rakić	Croatian Democratic Union
Sisak-Moslavina	Ivan Celjak	Croatian Democratic Union
Split-Dalmatia	Blaženko Boban	Croatian Democratic Union
Varaždin	Anđelko Stričak	Croatian Democratic Union
Virovitica-Podravina	Igor Andrović	Croatian Democratic Union
Vukovar-Srijem	Ivan Bosančić	Croatian Democratic Union
Zadar	Josip Bilaver	Croatian Democratic Union
Zagreb	Stjepan Kožić	Stjepan Kožić - Independent List

== See also ==
- Croatian local elections
