= List of mayors of Rijeka =

This is a list of people who have served as mayor or president of the city council of the city of Rijeka, the third largest city in Croatia.

#	Term	Mayor
1	1948–1952	Petar Klausberger
2	1952–1962	Edo Jardas
3	1962–1965	Nikola Pavletić
4	1965–1969	Dragutin Haramija
5	1969–1974	Neda Andrić
6	1974–1978	Nikola Pavletić
7	1978–1982	Vilim Mulc
8	1982	Sergije Lukeš
9	1982–1984	Josip Štefan
10	1984–1985	Ivan Brnelić
11	1985–1988	Zdravko Saršon
12	1988–1993	Željko Lužavec
13	1993–2000	Slavko Linić
14	2000–2021	Vojko Obersnel
15	2021–2025	Marko Filipović
16	2025–	Iva Rinčić

== See also ==
- Rijeka
