= 2024 European Parliament election in Croatia =

- 9 June 2024

All 12 Croatian seats to the European Parliament
- Turnout: 21.35% (▼8.50 pp)
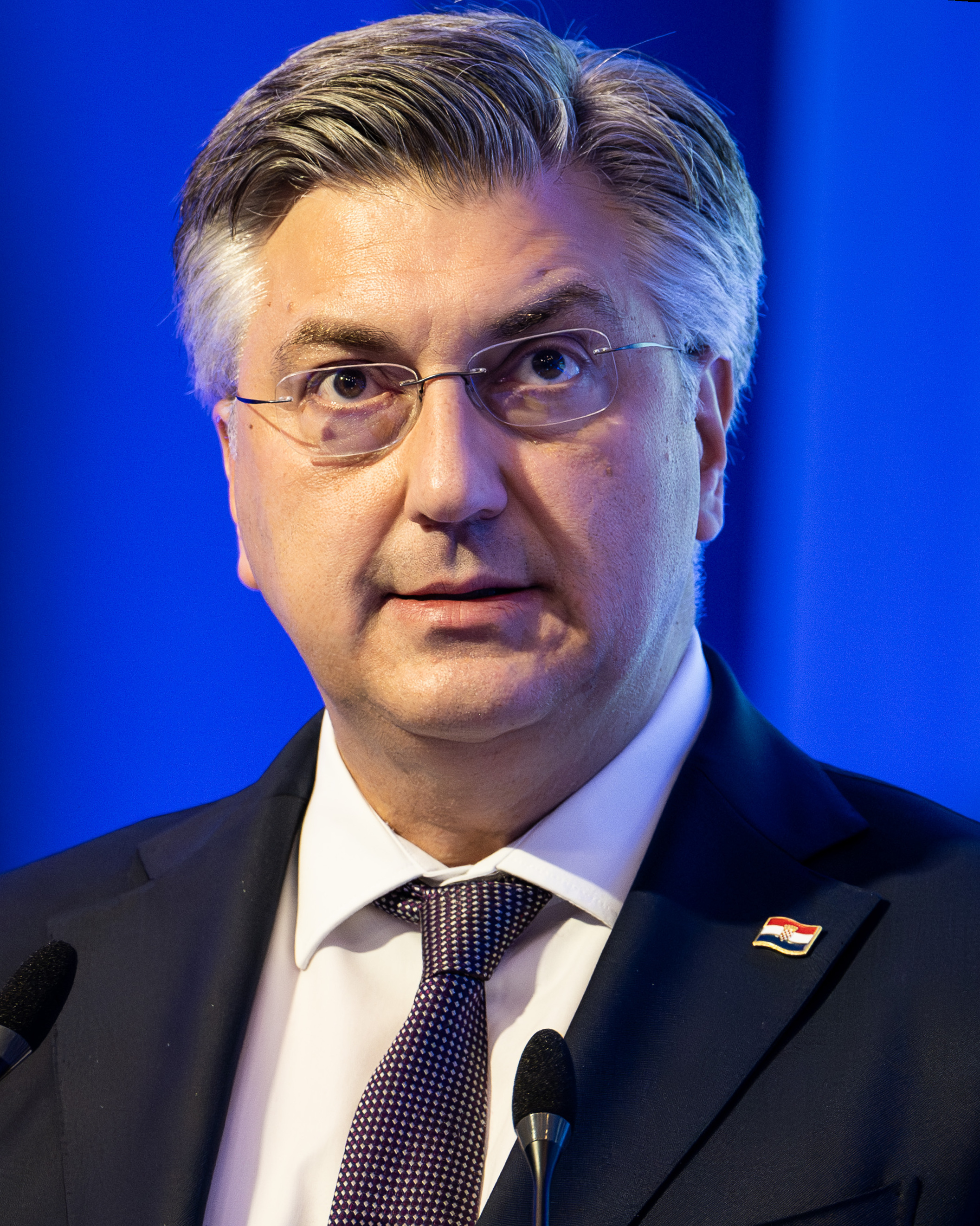

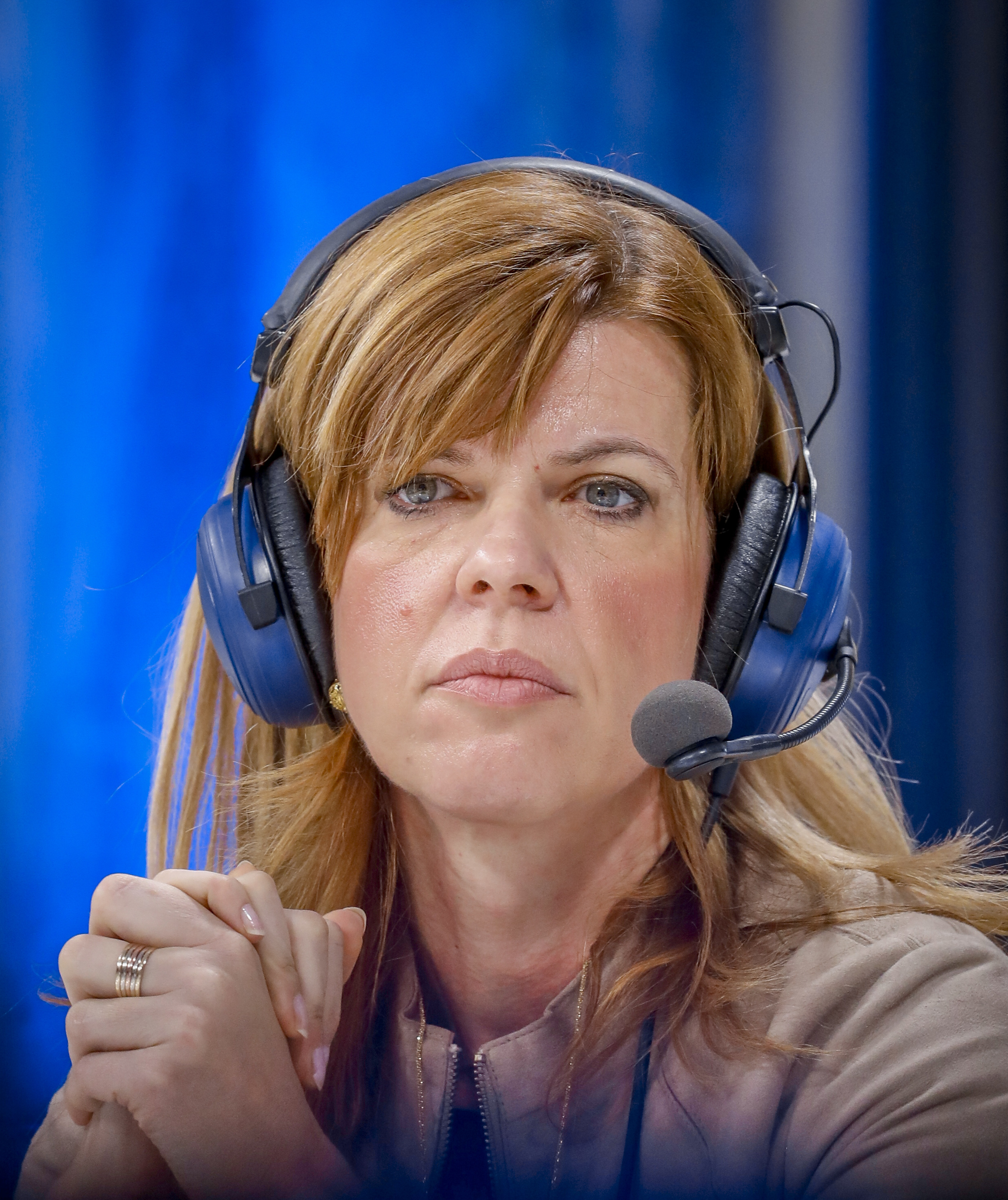

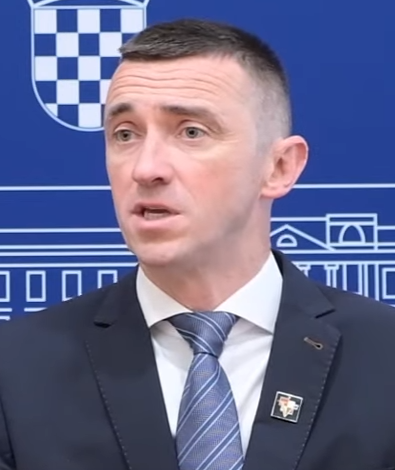

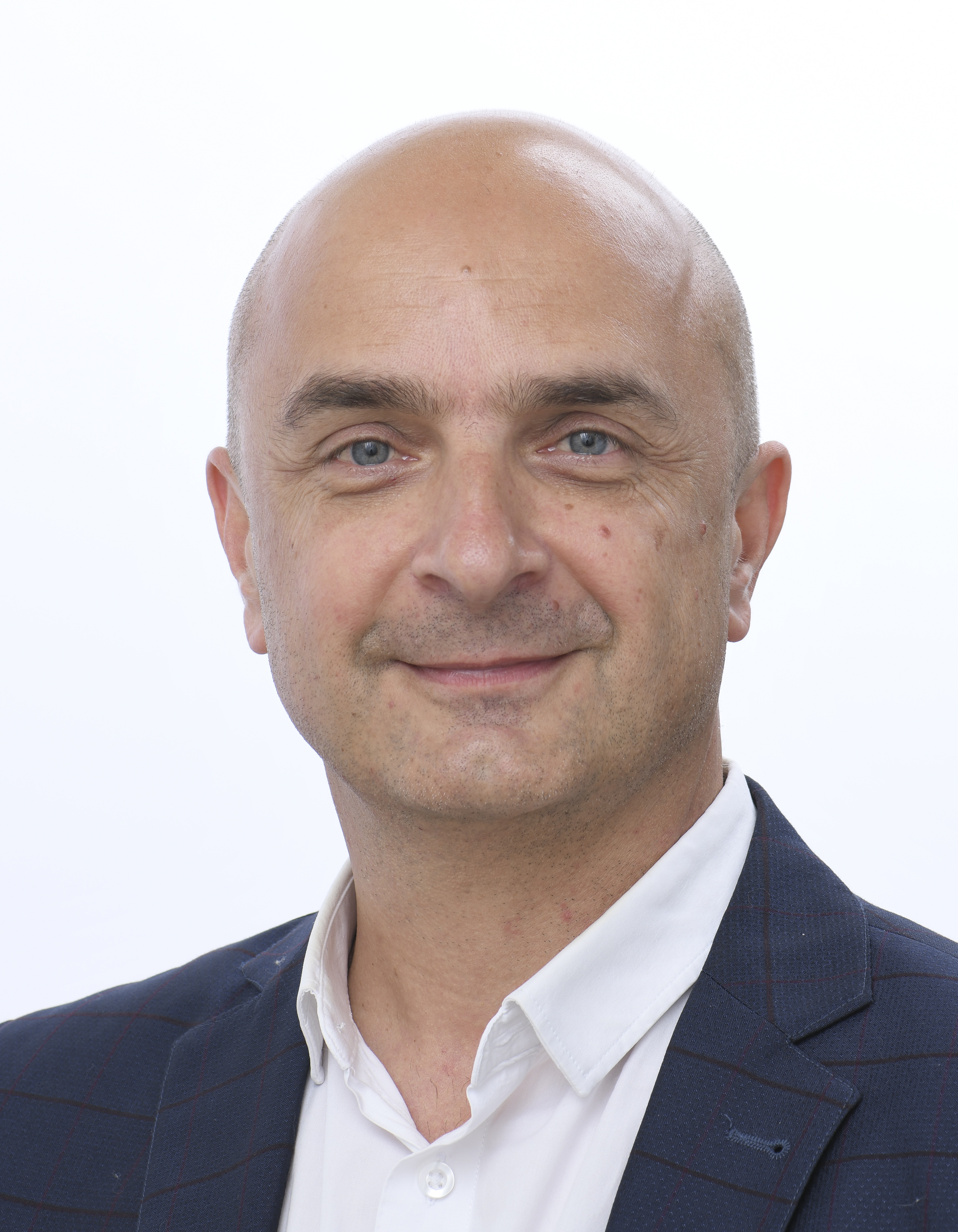
	First party	Second party
Candidate	Andrej Plenković	Biljana Borzan
Party	HDZ	Rivers of Justice
Alliance	EPP	S&D; Renew
Last election	27.1%, 4 seats (Note: Including HDZ and Independent list of Marijana Petir results from the 2019 European Parliament election)	22.1%, 4 seats (Note: Including SDP, START and Pametno results from the 2019 European Parliament election)
Seats won	6	4
Seat change	▲2	Steady
Popular vote	264,415	192,859
Percentage	35.13%	25.62%
	Third party	Fourth party
Candidate	Ivan Penava	Gordan Bosanac
Party	DP	Možemo!
Alliance	ECR	Greens–EFA
Last election	Did not exist	1.8%, 0 seats (Note: Compared to the result of the Green-Left Coalition)
Seats won	1	1
Seat change	New	▲1
Popular vote	66,541	44,670
Percentage	8.84%	5.93%
- Results by counties and historical regions

The 2024 European Parliament elections in Croatia were held on 9 June 2024 as part of the 2024 European Parliament election. This was the fourth parliamentary election since Croatia's EU accession in 2013, and the first to take place after Brexit.

It was the second election in 2024, the "superelection year" for Croatia, following the April parliamentary election and preceding the presidential election. Concurrently with this election, four local elections were held on the same day, including the mayoral election in Gospić.

== Background ==
Since the previous 2019 election, Prime Minister Andrej Plenković was re-elected in both 2020 and 2024 parliamentary elections. After the latter, the ruling Croatian Democratic Union (HDZ), who had fallen short of an absolute majority, formed a coalition government with the right-wing Homeland Movement.

== Electoral system ==
Compared to last election, Croatia is entitled to one more MEP in this election, already assigned since 2020 in the occasion of the redistribution post Brexit. The 12 members are elected through semi-open list proportional representation in a single nationwide constituency with seats allocated through D'Hondt method. The electoral threshold is set at 5%, but due to the seat allocation procedure, at least one seat is only guaranteed from a vote share of at least 8.33%.

All people who have Croatian citizenship and a main residence in Croatian, Croatian citizens without residence in Croatia and other Union citizens whose main residence is in Croatia are entitled to vote in the European elections in Croatia. In addition, those eligible to vote must turn 18 years old by election day at the latest. Voter registration is required only for non-Croatian EU citizen residing in Croatia, while Croatian citizen are automatically registered in their place of residence.

== Outgoing delegation ==
The table shows the detailed composition of the Croatian seats at the European Parliament as of 23 January 2024. All outgoing MEPs are running for re-election.

EP Group	Seats	Party	Seats	MEPs
European People's Party	4 / 12	Croatian Democratic Union	4	Sunčana Glavak; Karlo Ressler; Tomislav Sokol; Željana Zovko
Progressive Alliance of Socialists and Democrats	4 / 12	Social Democratic Party of Croatia	4	Biljana Borzan; Romana Jerković; Predrag Matić; Tonino Picula
Non-Inscrits	2 / 12	Law and Justice	2	Ivan Vilibor Sinčić; Mislav Kolakušić
Renew Europe	1 / 12	Istrian Democratic Assembly	1	Valter Flego
European Conservatives and Reformists	1 / 12	Croatian Sovereignists	1	Ladislav Ilčić
Total			12	
Source: European Parliament

== Electoral lists ==
Parties could submit their nomination applications for participation to the State Electoral Commission (DIP) from 10 to 23 April. On 23 April, the DIP released a list of all submitted candidacies, with the list of all valid candidacies being released on 24 April.

This is a list of the main parties who participated in the election.

Party		Leading candidate	Main ideology	European party	EP Group	2019 result		Outgoing MEPs
Party		Leading candidate	Main ideology	European party	EP Group	Votes (%)	Seats	Outgoing MEPs
HDZ	Croatian Democratic Union	Andrej Plenković	Christian democracy	EPP	EPP	22.7%	4 / 12	4 / 12
SDP+	Rivers of Justice List: Social Democratic Party (SDP); Centre (CENTAR); Croatian Peasant Party (HSS); Civic Liberal Alliance (GLAS); Dalija Orešković and People with a First and Last Name (DO i SIP)	Biljana Borzan	Social democracy	PES; ALDE	S&D; Renew	22.1%	4 / 12	4 / 12
PiP	Law and Justice	Mislav Kolakušić	Populism	None	NI	Did not contest (Note: A merger of the Independent List of Mislav Kolakušić (7.89%, 1 seat) and The Key of Croatia (5,67%, 1 seat))		2 / 14
Most	The Bridge List: Croatian Sovereignists (HS); Croatian Party of Rights (HSP)	Božo Petrov	Social conservativism	ECR Party	ECR	17.6% (Note: Including MOST, HS and NHR–HSP results from the 2019 European Parliament election)	1 / 12	0 / 12
IDS+	Fair Play List 9 List: Istrian Democratic Assembly (IDS); Independent Platform of the North (NPS); Independent Democratic Serb Party (SDSS); Croatian Social Liberal Party (HSLS); Croatian People's Party – Liberal Democrats (HNS); Reformists (NS-R); Social Democrats (SD); Democrats (D); Alliance of Primorje-Gorski Kotar (PGS); List for Rijeka (RI)	Valter Flego	Liberalism; Regionalism	ALDE; EDP	Renew	11.9% (Note: IDS, SDSS, HSLS, HNS, Reformists, SD, PGS)	1 / 12	1 / 12
M!	We can!	Gordan Bosanac	Green politics	EGP	Greens-EFA	1.8%	0 / 12	0 / 12
DP	Homeland Movement	Ivan Penava	National conservativism	None	None	Did not contest		0 / 12
NLLI	Independent list of Ladislav Ilčić	Ladislav Ilčić	Christian right	None	ECR	Did not contest		1 / 12

This table lists all other, minor lists participating in the election.

Party	European Party	Group	2019 result	Lead candidate	Note
Authentic Croatian Party of Rights	None	None	0.41%	Dražen Keleminec	
Workers' Front	PEL	LEFT	0.24%	Katarina Peović	with SRP in 2019
Movement for a Modern Croatia	None	None	0.24%	Damir Gašparović	
Party of Ivan Pernar	None	None	–	Ivan Pernar	
Croatian Party of Pensioners	None	None	–	Ema Culi	part of Amsterdam Coalition in 2019
Green Alternative – ORaH	EGP	Greens-EFA	–	Zorislav Antun Petrović	part of Green–Left Coalition in 2019
Republic	None	None	–	Luka Kraljević	
Determination and Justice	None	None	–	Karolina Vidović Krišto	
UZ–SU–BUZ–DSU	None	None	–	Milivoj Špika	
Independent list of Nina Skočak	None	None	–	Nina Skočak	called "The Gen Z List"
Dalmatian Action	None	None	–	Nino Aviani	
Righteous Croatia	None	None	–	Tihomir Majić	
Ričard Independent	None	None	–	Enio Meštrović	
Public Good	None	None	–	Vladimira Mascarell	
Agrarian Party	None	None	–	Robert Hadžić	
Movement for Animals	None	None	–	Marcel Maglica	
Croatian Civil Resistance Party	None	None	–	Josip Babok	

=== Candidates ===
4: DP	5: HDZ	9: Fair Play List 9	11: Most - HS - HSP	12: Možemo!	17: PiP	22: Rivers of Justice
Candidates: 1. Ivan Penava; 2. Stephen Nikola Bartulica; 3. Slobodan Novak; 4. Branka Lozo; 5. Jesenka Ricl; 6. Davor Dretar; 7. Ivana Mujkić; 8. Dubravka Lipovac Pehar; 9. Josip Jurčević; 10. Ivica Kukavica; 11. Anamarija Frankić; 12. Stipo Mlinarić	Candidates: 1. Andrej Plenković; 2. Dubravka Šuica; 3. Davor Ivo Stier; 4. Karlo Ressler; 5. Nikolina Brnjac; 6. Željana Zovko; 7. Sunčana Glavak; 8. Tomislav Sokol; 9. Marko Pavić; 10. Ante Mihanović; 11. Danijel Marušić; 12. Marijana Petir	Candidates: 1. Valter Flego; 2. Matija Posavec; 3. Spomenka Đurić; 4. Domagoj Hajduković; 5. Gabriela Bošnjak; 6. Ana Trošelj; 7. Rajko Ostojić; 8. Tatjana Vukobratović Spasojević; 9. Anita Perešin; 10. Krunoslav Lukačić; 11. Radimir Čačić; 12. Milorad Pupovac	Candidates: 1. Božo Petrov; 2. Zvonimir Troskot; 3. Dominik Klemenčić; 4. Željko Glasnović; 5. Nikola Grmoja; 6. Petra Mandić; 7. Kristina Jerčić; 8. Ivan Vidović; 9. Kristina Bakula; 10. Anamarija Jurković; 11. Željka Ilijaš Baričević; 12. Marin Miletić	Candidates: 1. Gordan Bosanac; 2. Jelena Miloš; 3. Vedran Horvat; 4. Rada Borić; 5. Urša Raukar-Gamulin; 6. Marta Kiš; 7. Jagoda Munić; 8. Dušica Radojčić; 9. Damir Bakić; 10. Borna Lozo; 11. Nebojša Zelič; 12. Ivana Kekin	Candidates: 1. Mislav Kolakušić; 2. Ivan Vilibor Sinčić; 3. Ivan Lovrinović; 4. Nada Tušak; 5. Isidora Rajković; 6. Ines Taradi; 7. Ivana Kolovrat; 8. Tatjana Vučić; 9. Nensi Krupić; 10. Ivana Stampf; 11. Damir Trnačić; 12. Tihomir Lukanić	Candidates: 1. Biljana Borzan; 2. Predrag Matić; 3. Romana Jerković; 4. Marko Vešligaj; 5. Dalija Orešković; 6. Bojan Glavašević; 7. Sonja Kovač; 8. Joško Klisović; 9. Vedrana Mišković; 10. Ranko Ostojić; 11. Željka Šarčević Grgić; 12. Tonino Picula

== Campaign ==
=== Pre-election events ===
==== Croatian Democratic Union ====
The Prime Minister of Croatia, the president of Croatian Democratic Union (HDZ) and former MEP (2013–2016) Andrej Plenković will lead the list of HDZ. Together with the rumours about his potential EP candidacy, which were confirmed by Plenković to reporters on 22 April, rumours have been circulating about Plenković as the possible next President of the European Commission, started by Bild and continued by Politico.

On 10 May, HDZ and European People's Party organized a joint rally in Split. The spitzenkandidat of EPP and incumbent President of the European Commission Ursula von der Leyen and Andrej Plenković pointed out their successes with von der Leyen saying she's impressed with the progress Croatia is making. The president of HDZ BiH Dragan Čović thanked Plenković for his support of Croats in Bosnia and Herzegovina.

==== Social Democratic Party ====
The Social Democratic Party of Croatia (SDP) approved its 2024 European Parliament list on 25 March, together with Rivers of Justice coalition lists for the 2024 Croatian parliamentary election. Incumbent MEP Biljana Borzan is leading the list that, in addition to SDP members, includes coalition partners Dalija Orešković (DO i SIP) and Bojan Glavašević (Ind.).

==== Fair Play List ====
The Istrian Democratic Assembly (IDS) MEP Valter Flego announced that a centrist bloc was formed to contest the election, consisting of: IDS, SDSS, HSLS, HNS, NS-R, SD, PGS, RI, Independent Platform of the North (NPS) and independent candidates. On 22 May, Flego presented the coalition named Fair Play List 9. Flego was endorsed by Alexander De Croo, the Prime Minister of Belgium from the Flemish Open Vld.

==== The Bridge – Sovereignists ====
The Bridge (Most) presented its joint list with Croatian Sovereignists (HS) and far-right Croatian Party of Rights (HSP) for the election on 23 April, with Most leader Božo Petrov as the top candidate. The parties are running on a social conservative and christian right platform, putting forward their initiative Vratimo EU kršćanskim korijenima (English: "Let's return the EU to its Christian roots").

The list was originally supposed to be headed by Member of Parliament Marija Selak Raspudić. On 24 April, Selak Raspudić announced her and her husband's, MP Nino Raspudić's departure from Most. The two MPs and intellectuals, described by political commentators as the most educated and open-minded people in Most, were perceived as the most popular figures of the party that brought new life to Most after joining in 2020, attracting urban voters. Selak Raspudić, who describes herself as closest to centrist positions and was formally independent, cites a clash with the party Vice president Marin Miletić on abortion issue as one of the reason for the couple's decision. Miletić, an ultraconservative, publicly distanced from his colleague Selak Raspudić after in an N1 debate, ahead of the April parliamentary election, she said that abortion is the right of a woman. Selak Raspudić said that the coalition with HSP was not at the table at the time when she was still supposed to be a candidate.

==== We Can! ====
The We Can! (Možemo!) is running with party spokesperson and human rights activist Gordan Bosanac as their slate leader. The list emphasizes their fight to continue with the green transition and defence of anti-fascist Europe in the event of continued surge of far-right parties in the EU. On 29 May, the spitzenkandidat of European Greens, Bas Eickhout was present on a press conference in Zagreb to support the party.

==== Others ====
Incumbent MEP Ladislav Ilčić became a Member of the European Parliament for Croatian Sovereignists (HS) on 1 July 2021, replacing Ruža Tomašić, who had resigned. Ilčić submitted his list running as an independent candidate. He previously voiced his opposition to HS running in the 2024 parliamentary election in a coalition with The Bridge.

Social media influencer Nina Skočak is running in the election with her own independent list, dubbed by her and the media as "The Gen Z List". A politologist and journalist by profession, working for the European Commission in Brussels, she has over 200 thousand followers on TikTok. The list, that consists of candidates which are all not older than 30 years old, highlights the lack of representation for young people in politics. Skočak often covers political topics with her social media content, such as sustainable fashion and women's rights.

=== Issues ===
==== European Green Deal ====
European Green Deal is one of the main issues in the campaign, together with the initiative's impact and European policies on agriculture. WWF Adria, environmental organization BIOM and Nova TV all requested for candidates or parties to give statements on the topic. According to BIOM and WWF, parties HDZ, SDP, Možemo!, ORaH, DP and RF all responded with support for the Deal, with some stating reservations on the deadlines. RF emphasized that there is no green transition without changing the capitalist way of production and distribution of goods. For Nova TV, Tomislav Sokol (HDZ) criticized "unnecessary administrative and environmental burdens" pushed by the "extreme green left", while Božo Petrov (Most) announced they will confront "harmful green policies that brought farmers to the brink of bankruptcy or bankruptcy, and increased food prices".

==== Palestine ====
On 23 May, Možemo! asked the government to recognise Palestine as an independent state, call for ceasefire and stop with the "inhuman passivity" when it comes to the Israeli–Palestinian conflict. The party announced a motion in Parliament that will also include sending humanitarian help to Palestinians. Governments of Norway, Spain and Ireland announced their coordinated recognition the day before. When asked about it by the press, Andrej Plenković said the government is not considering recognising Palestine for the time being. Croatia was one of the 25 countries abstaining in the vote on United Nations General Assembly Resolution ES-10/23.

=== Party slogans ===
Party/alliance	Original slogan	English translation	Ref.
HDZ	„Hrvatska, snažna i važna“	"Croatia, strong and important"	
Rivers of Justice	„Radimo za hrvatske ljude!“	"We work for the Croatian people!"	
Možemo!	„Borbeno. Dosljedno. Zajedno!“	"Fiercely. Consistently. Together!"	
Most–HS–HSP	„Osloni se na naše“	"Rely on ours"	
DP	„Suverena Hrvatska u Europi“	"Sovereign Croatia in Europe"	
Fair Play List 9	„U našem timu igraju samo najbolji.”	"Only the best are playing in our team."	
IDS	„Naša forca u Briselu!“	"Our force in Bruxelles!"	
IDS	Italian: „Con Flego in Europa“	"With Flego in Europe"	

=== Election debates ===
2024 European Parliament election debates in Croatia
Date	Organizers	P Present A Absent invitee I Invitee N Non-invitee							
Date	Organizers	HDZ	SDP	DP	Most	Možemo	IDS	PiP	Refs
17 May	Večernji list	P Karlo Ressler	P Predrag Fred Matić	P Stephen Nikola Bartulica	P Božo Petrov	P Gordan Bosanac	NI	NI	
21 May	Nova TV	P Karlo Ressler	P Predrag Fred Matić	P Stephen Nikola Bartulica	P Petra Mandić	P Gordan Bosanac	NI	NI	
2 Jun	N1	P Tomislav Sokol	P Marko Vešligaj	P Branka Lozo	P Božo Petrov	P Gordan Bosanac	NI	NI	
4 June	Nova TV	P Davor Ivo Stier	P Biljana Borzan	P Davor Dretar	P Božo Petrov	P Gordan Bosanac	NI	NI	

=== Financing ===
GONG created and published an easily searchable database of preliminary financial reports delivered by political parties to the DIP. It contains data about donations and funding spent in the campaign by 2 June, including media advertising. According to the reports, the HDZ had spent the most, €221,650 of the maximum possible amount of €530,891 on election advertising. Ladislav Ilčić received the most donations overall, as well as the two highest individual donations.

Cost of the elections was estimated on 9.245 million euros.

== Opinion polls ==
Publication date	Polling firm	Sample size	HDZ EPP	SDP S&D	Most ECR	PiP NI	IDS RE	DP ID	M! G/EFA	Others	Undecided	Lead
6 Jun 2024	Ipsos	1001	31.9; 5	24.6; 4	6.1; 1	-	3.7; 0	5.8; 1	6.5; 1	(Note: HSU at 3.8%; all others under 3.5% each)	7.7	7.3
5 Jun 2024	Promocija plus	1300	28.4; 5	20.5; 4	5.7; 1	3.9; 0	3.2; 0	6.9; 1	7.4; 1	11.7 (Note: Including Gen Z list at 2.1%, RF at 1.3%, HSU at 1.1%, and Ladislav Ilčić at 1.0%); 0	12.3	7.9
2 Jun 2024	2x1 komunikacije	1041	31.2; 5	22.0; 3	7.1; 1	3.7; 0	3.8; 0	8.7; 1	11.1; 2	-	11.0	9.2
25 May 2024	Ipsos	990	28.5; 5	17.8; 3	5.4; 1	1.8; 0	3.8; 0	7.4; 1	9.9; 2	12.2 (Note: Including HSU at 1.9%, The Gen Z list at 1.9% and Republika at 1.1%); 0	14.9	10.7
4 May 2024	Promocija plus	1000	30.6; 5	24.2; 4	5.4; 1	2.5; 0	2.3; 0	6.7; 1	7.5; 1	-	-	6.4
17 Apr 2024	2024 parliamentary election	–	34.4	25.4	8.0	(Note: with DP)	2.3	9.6	9.1	11.2	-	9.0
26 May 2019	2019 European election	–	27.1; 4	22.1; 4	17.6; 1	13.6; 2	11.9; 1	–	1.8; 0	5.8	-	5.0

== Voter turnout ==
Turnout	Time								
Turnout	11:30			16:30			19:00		
Turnout	2019	2024	±	2019	2024	±	2019	2024	±
Total	9.93%	7.69%	▼2.24 pp	21.31%	15.05%	▼6.26 pp	29.85%	21.35%	▼8.50 pp
Sources: State Electoral Commission

== Results ==
Party	Votes	%	Seats	+/–
Croatian Democratic Union	264,415	35.13	6	+2
Rivers of Justice	192,859	25.62	4	0
Homeland Movement	66,541	8.84	1	New
We can!	44,670	5.93	1	+1
Fair Play List 9	41,710	5.54	0	-1
Independent list of Nina Skočak	30,369	4.03	0	New
The Bridge–HS–HSP	30,155	4.01	0	-1
Law and Justice	22,425	2.98	0	-2
Determination and Justice	10,328	1.37	0	New
Independent list of Ladislav Ilčić	9,156	1.22	0	New
Ričard Independent	8,757	1.16	0	New
Croatian Party of Pensioners	5,235	0.70	0	New
Workers' Front	4,729	0.63	0	0
Pensioners Together	4,298	0.57	0	New
Movement for Animals	3,060	0.41	0	New
Agrarian Party	2,840	0.38	0	New
Party of Ivan Pernar	2,280	0.30	0	New
Green Alternative – ORaH	1,636	0.22	0	0
Autochthonous Croatian Party of Rights	1,402	0.19	0	0
Republic	1,099	0.15	0	New
Movement for a Modern Croatia	1,005	0.13	0	0
Croatian Civil Resistance Party	986	0.13	0	New
Dalmatian Action	973	0.13	0	New
Righteous Croatia	963	0.13	0	New
Public Good	770	0.10	0	New
Total	752,661	100.00	12	0
Valid votes	752,661	98.50		
Invalid/blank votes	11,428	1.50		
Total votes	764,089	100.00		
Registered voters/turnout	3,731,860	20.47		
Source: Results

Popular vote (party)
HDZ	35.13%
SDP	25.62%
DP	8.84%
Možemo!	5.93%
Fiair Play	5.54%
Gen Z	4.03%
Most	4.01%
PiP	2.99%
OiP	1.37%
NLLI	1.22%
Others	4.32%

=== List of elected MEPs ===
Candidate	Party	Group	Preference votes	Share of preference votes on candidate's list	Previous term	Note
Andrej Plenković	HDZ	EPP	101,820	39.72%	1 July 2013 – 12 October 2016	Refused to take the seat, replaced by Sunčana Glavak
Biljana Borzan	SDP	S&D	83,656	43.49%	1 July 2013 –	
Stephen Nikola Bartulica	DP	ECR	35,303	53.99%	None	
Tonino Picula	SDP	S&D	30,099	15.65%	1 July 2013 –	
Davor Ivo Stier	HDZ	EPP	25,424	9.91%	19 October 2016 – 19 June 2017	
Predrag Matić	SDP	S&D	17,239	8.96%	2 July 2019 –	Died on 23 August 2024
Ivana Kekin	M!	Greens/EFA	11,307	25.76%	None	Refused to take the seat, replaced by Gordan Bosanac
Dubravka Šuica	HDZ	EPP	8,864	3.45%	1 July 2013 – 30 November 2019	Refused to take the seat, replaced by Tomislav Sokol
Nikolina Brnjac	HDZ	EPP	7,734	3.01%	None	
Željana Zovko	HDZ/HDZ BiH	EPP	6,707	2.61%	21 November 2016 –	
Karlo Ressler	HDZ	EPP	6,273	2.44%	2 July 2019 –	
Romana Jerković	SDP	S&D	1,005	0.52%	1 February 2020 –	

=== Voter demographics ===
Demographic breakdown of the electorate
Demographic	HDZ	SDP	DP	Možemo	IDS	Gen Z	Most
Total vote	35.1	25.6	8.8	5.9	5.5	4.0	4.0
Gender
Male	34.7	24.4	10.3	5.0	5.0	–	4.0
Female	30.5	29.1	7.7	7.3	4.5	7.3	3.5
Age
18–29	24.1	14.0	5.5	9.5	–	22.1	6.0
30–44	30.3	21.3	<6	11.2	–	6.0	–
45–59	34.6	27.9	8.6	5.5	5.0	<2	4.5
60+	34.9	32.7	9.8	3.5	5.5	0.5	–
Source: IPSOS exit poll

== See also ==
- Croatia (European Parliament constituency)
- 2024 Croatian parliamentary election
