= Electoral district X (Croatian Parliament) =

- Constituency for the Croatian Parliament
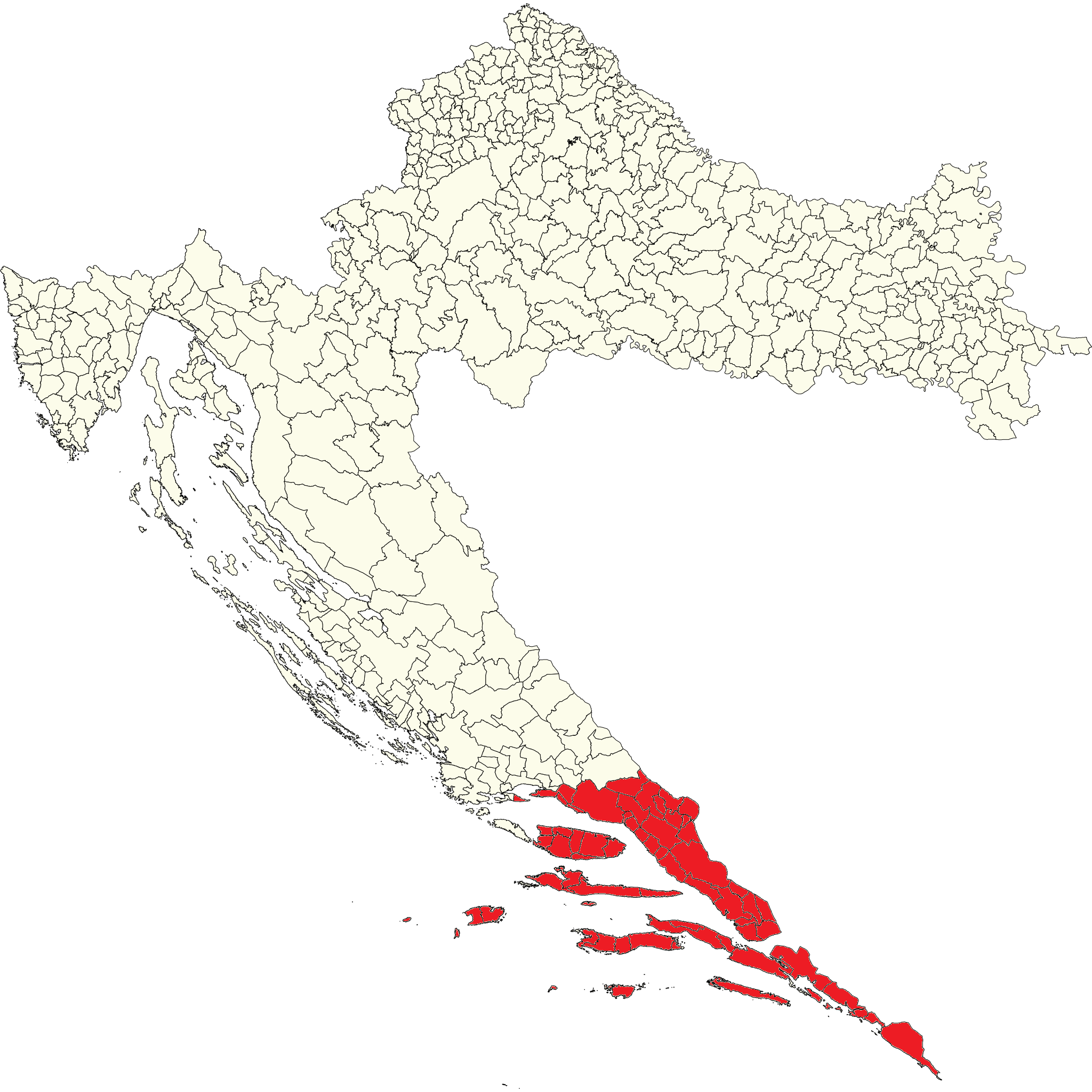
- Map of Electoral district X (2023-present)
- Electorate: 369,062 (2025)
- Major settlements: Split, Omiš, Makarska, Imotski, Dubrovnik, Metković

Current constituency
- Created: 2023
- Number of members: 14

Electoral district X (Croatian: X. izborna jedinica) is one of twelve electoral districts of the Croatian Parliament. In 2025, the district had 369,062 registered voters.

== Boundaries ==
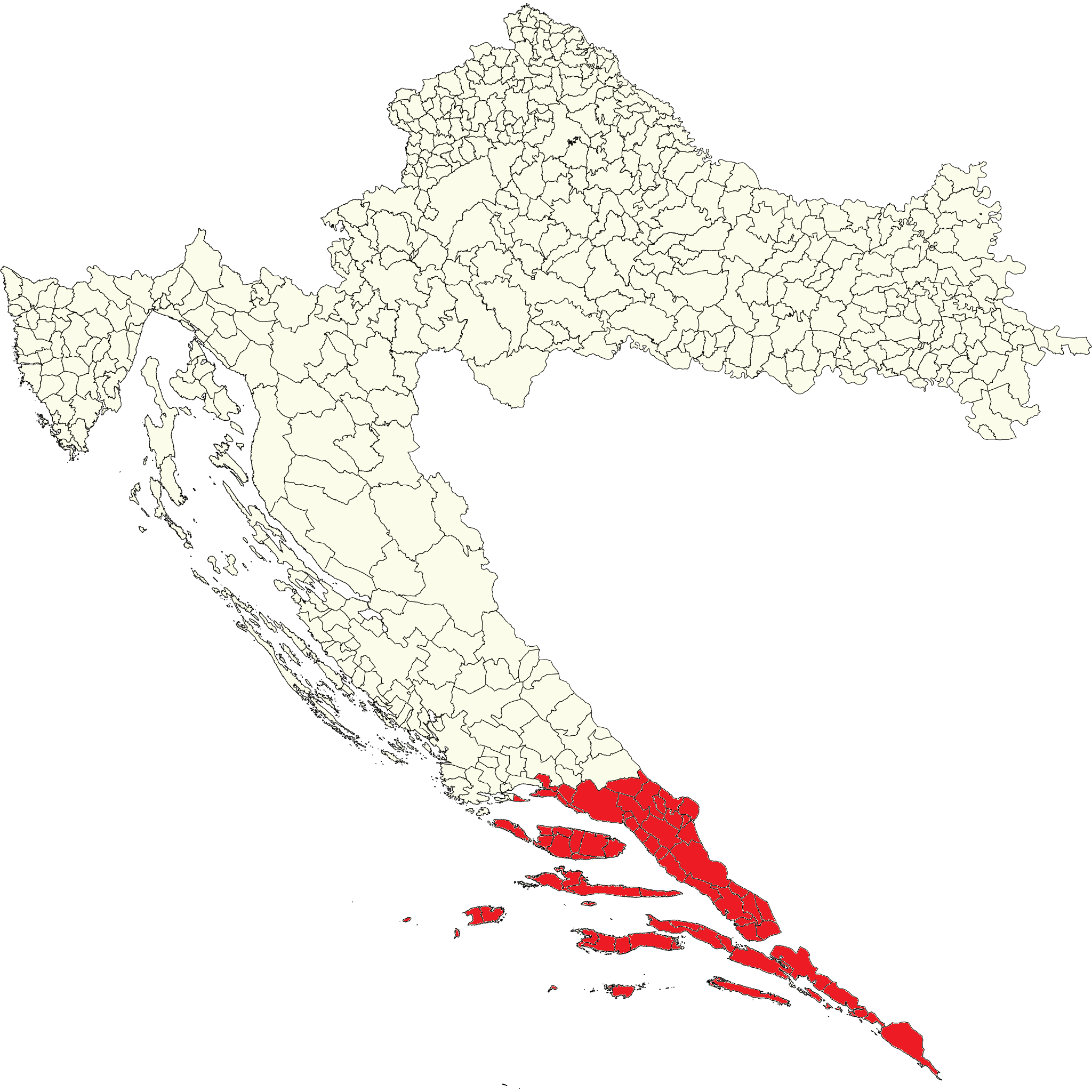
Electoral district X (1999-2023)

=== Creation ===
From 1999 to 2023, electoral district X consisted of:

- The southern part of Split-Dalmatia County including the cities and municipalities: Baška Voda, Bol, Brela, Cista Provo, Dugi Rat, Gradac, Hvar, Imotski, Jelsa, Komiža, Lokvičići, Lovreć, Makarska, Milna, Nerežišća, Omiš, Podbablje, Podgora, Podstrana, Postira, Proložac, Pučišća, Runovići, Selca, Solin, Split, Stari Grad, Sućuraj, Supetar, Sutivan, Šestanovac, Šolta, Tučepi, Vis, Vrgorac, Zadvarje, Zagvozd, Zmijavci;
- The whole Dubrovnik-Neretva County.

=== 2023 revision ===
Under the 2023 revision, district boundaries were redrawn according to the suggestion of the Constitutional Court to compel a proportional number of voters.

The new district consists of:

- The whole Dubrovnik-Neretva County
- The southern part of Split-Dalmatia County:
  - cities and municipalities: Hvar, Imotski, Komiža, Makarska, Omiš, Split, Stari Grad, Supetar, Vis, Vrgorac, Baška Voda, Bol, Brela, Cista Provo, Dugi Rat, Gradac, Jelsa, Lokvičići, Lovreć, Milna, Nerežišća, Podbablje, Podgora, Podstrana, Postira, Proložac, Pučišća, Runovići, Selca, Sućuraj, Sutivan, Šestanovac, Tučepi, Zadvarje, Zagvozd and Zmijavci

== Representatives ==
The current representatives of the tenth electoral district in the Croatian Parliament are:

Name	Party	Deputizing
Danica Baričević	HDZ	Damir Krstičević
Ivan Budalić	HDZ	Blaženko Boban
Mato Franković	HDZ	
Andro Krstulović Opara	HDZ	
Dalibor Milan	HDZ	Branko Bačić
Tomislav Šuta	HDZ	
Mišo Krstičević	SDP	
Ivana Marković	SDP	
Ranko Ostojić	SDP	
Ante Kujundžić	Most	
Božo Petrov	Most	
Ivica Kukavica	DP	
Stipo Mlinarić	DP	
Damir Barbir	Centre	Ivica Puljak

== Elections ==
=== 2000 Elections ===
Party	Votes	%	Seats
HSLS - SDP	118.393	40.60	8
HDZ	81.646	28.00	5
HSS - LS - HNS - ASH	28.035	9.62	1
others	63.500	21.78	0
Total	291.574	100	14
Valid votes	291.574	98.76	
Invalid/blank votes	3.668	1.24	
Total votes	295.242	75.32	
Registered voters/turnout	391.959		
Source: Results Archived 2022-12-07 at the Wayback Machine

HSLS - SDP

- Ivan Škarić
- Marin Jurjević
- Vedran Lendić
- Andro Vlahušić
- Tonči Žuvela
- Branka Baletić
- Ante Grabovac
- Vesna Podlipec

HDZ

- Jure Radić
- Ivo Sanader
- Luka Bebić
- Dubravka Šuica
- Ivica Tafra

HSS - LS - HNS - ASH

- Luka Roić

=== 2003 Elections ===
Party	Votes	%	Seats	+/-
HDZ	105.469	39.17	7	+2
SDP - Libra - LS	59.286	22.02	4	0
HNS	19.726	7.33	1	+1
HSP	16.762	6.22	1	+1
HSS	15.480	5.75	1	0
others	52.564	19.51	0	-4
Total	269.286	100	14	0
Valid votes	269.286	98.08		
Invalid/blank votes	5.275	1.92		
Total votes	274.561	68.41		
Registered voters/turnout	401.333			
Source: Results Archived 2022-12-07 at the Wayback Machine

HDZ

- Ivo Sanader
- Živko Nenadić
- Luka Bebić
- Dubravka Šuica
- Zvonimir Puljić
- Dujomir Marasović
- Branko Bačić

SDP - Libra - LS

- Slavko Linić
- Marin Jurjević
- Neven Mimica
- Jagoda Martić

HNS

- Jakša Marasović

HSP

- Ruža Tomašić

HSS

- Luka Roić

=== 2007 Elections ===
Party	Votes	%	Seats	+/-
HDZ	115.740	44.57	8	+1
SDP	73.415	28.27	5	+1
HSS - HSLS	14.808	5.70	1	0
others	55.700	21.46	0	-2
Total	259.663	100	14	0
Valid votes	259.663	98.59		
Invalid/blank votes	3.709	1.41		
Total votes	263.372	63.31		
Registered voters/turnout	416.017			
Source: Results

HDZ

- Ivo Sanader
- Luka Bebić
- Jerko Rošin
- Dubravka Šuica
- Živko Nenadić
- Zvonimir Puljić
- Branko Bačić
- Frano Matušić

SDP

- Željka Antunović
- Marin Jurjević
- Branko Grčić
- Tatjana Šimac-Bonačić
- Arsen Bauk

HSS - HSLS

- Stipo Gabrić

=== 2011 Elections ===
Party	Votes	%	Seats	+/-
SDP - HNS - IDS - HSU	82.628	33.20	6	+1
HDZ - HGS	76.062	30.56	5	-3
Independent Ivan Grubišić	29.088	11.69	2	+2
HSP AS - HČSP	14.938	6.00	1	+1
others	46.172	18.55	0	-1
Total	248.887	100	14	0
Valid votes	248.887	98.15		
Invalid/blank votes	4.688	1.85		
Total votes	253.575	60.03		
Registered voters/turnout	422.392			
Source: Results

SDP - HNS - IDS - HSU

- Arsen Bauk
- Branko Grčić
- Marin Jurjević
- Tatjana Šimac-Bonačić
- Tonka Ivčević
- Srđan Gjurković

HDZ - HGS

- Branko Bačić
- Damir Krstičević
- Željko Kerum
- Dujomir Marasović
- Frano Matušić

Independent Ivan Grubišić

- Ivan Grubišić
- Jakša Baloević

HSP AS - HČSP

- Ruža Tomašić

=== 2015 Elections ===
Party	Votes	%	Seats	+/-
HDZ - HSS - HSP AS - BUZ - HSLS - HDS - ZDS - HRAST	101.586	41.50	7	+2
SDP - HNS - HSU - HL SR - A-HSS - ZS	70.782	28.91	4	-2
Most	45.151	18.44	3	+3
others	27.277	11.15	0	-3
Total	244.796	100	14	0
Valid votes	244.796	98.41		
Invalid/blank votes	3.962	1.59		
Total votes	248.758	62.77		
Registered voters/turnout	396.286			
Source: Results

HDZ - HSS - HSP AS - BUZ - HSLS - HDS - ZDS - HRAST

- Damir Krstičević
- Zlatko Ževrnja
- Branko Bačić
- Milivoj Špika
- Petar Škorić
- Goran Dodig
- Sanja Putica

SDP - HNS - HSU - HL SR - A-HSS - ZS

- Ante Kotromanović
- Branko Grčić
- Arsen Bauk
- Darko Parić

Most

- Božo Petrov
- Ivan Kovačić
- Mario Klubučić

=== 2016 Elections ===
Party	Votes	%	Seats	+/-
HDZ - HDS	95.486	43.53	7	0
SDP - HNS - HSS - HSU	59.953	27.33	4	0
Most	36.454	16.62	3	0
others	27.431	12.52	0	0
Total	219.324	100	14	0
Valid votes	219.324	98.27		
Invalid/blank votes	3.856	1.73		
Total votes	223.180	56.65		
Registered voters/turnout	393.965			
Source: Results

HDZ - HDS

- Damir Krstičević
- Milan Kujundžić
- Andro Krstulović Opara
- Branko Bačić
- Petar Škorić
- Lovro Kušćević
- Goran Dodig

SDP - HNS - HSS - HSU

- Boris Lalovac
- Branko Grčić
- Arsen Bauk
- Darko Parić

Most

- Božo Petrov
- Ivan Kovačić
- Ivana Ninčević-Lesandrić

=== 2020 Elections ===
Party	Votes	%	Seats	+/-
HDZ - HDS	78.451	40.86	7	0
SDP - HSS - HSU - SNAGA - GLAS - IDS - PGS	39.292	20.46	3	-1
Most	23.149	12.05	2	-1
DP - HS - BLOK - HKS - HRAST - SU - ZL	19.740	10.28	1	+1
SsIP - Pametno - Fokus	10.356	5.39	1	+1
others	21.009	10.96	0	0
Total	191.997	100	14	0
Valid votes	191.997	97.93		
Invalid/blank votes	4.061	2.07		
Total votes	196.058	49.32		
Registered voters/turnout	397.508			
Source: Results Archived 2022-12-07 at the Wayback Machine

HDZ - HDS

- Vili Beroš
- Branko Bačić
- Blaženko Boban
- Andro Krstulović Opara
- Mato Franković
- Ante Mihanović
- Goran Dodig

SDP - HNS - HSS - HSU

- Arsen Bauk
- Katica Glamuzina
- Branko Grčić

Most

- Božo Petrov
- Ante Kujundžić

DP - HS - BLOK

- Ruža Tomašić

Pametno - SsIP - Focus

- Marijana Puljak
