= List of members of the Sabor, 2020–2024 =

The tenth Sabor was inaugurated on 22 July 2020. The assembly came into existence following the early parliamentary election on 5 July 2020 and consists of 151 representatives elected from 10 geographical and two special electoral districts.

== Parliamentary officials ==
The Speaker of the Croatian Parliament (or President) from 22 July 2020 was Gordan Jandroković.

Vice presidents of Sabor were from government side former Speaker Željko Reiner, Ante Sanader (all HDZ) and Furio Radin (Italian minority representative) and from opposition side Sabina Glasovac (SDP) and Davorko Vidović (SD).

== Composition ==
On the basis of the early parliamentary election of 2020, the composition of the Sabor as of December 2020 is as follows. National minority MPs can join one other club in addition to the national minority group.

=== By parliamentary club ===
Numbers of members at January 2023
Parliamentary clubs	Number
Croatian Democratic Union (HDZ)	64
Social Democrats (SD)	17
Social Democratic Party of Croatia (SDP)	13
The Bridge (Most)	8
National minorities club	8
Homeland Movement (DP)	7
We Can! (Možemo!)	5
Croatian Sovereignists	4
Focus (Fokus), Reformists(NS R) and Independents MPs	4
Istrian Democratic Assembly (IDS)	3
Croatian People's Party – Liberal Democrats (HNS), Croatian Party of Pensioners (HSU) and Independent MPs	3
Centre (Centar), Civic Liberal Alliance (GLAS) and Party with a First and Last Name (IP)	3
Croatian Peasant Party (HSS) and Workers' Front (RF)	3
Croatian Social Liberal Party (HSLS) and Independent MP	3
Independent Democratic Serb Party (SDSS)	3
For Rightful Croatia (PH)	3

=== MPs by party ===
Party	Name	Constituency/Deputizing
Croatian Democratic Union (63)	Krešimir Ačkar	District VI, deputizing Davor Božinović
Croatian Democratic Union (63)	Ante Bačić	District X, deputizing Ante Mihanović
Croatian Democratic Union (63)	Marijana Balić	District V
Croatian Democratic Union (63)	Nikolina Baradić	District IX, deputizing Božidar Kalmeta
Croatian Democratic Union (63)	Nevenko Barbarić	District XI
Croatian Democratic Union (63)	Danica Baričević	District X, deputizing Branko Bačić
Croatian Democratic Union (63)	Dražen Barišić	District VI
Croatian Democratic Union (63)	Vesna Bedeković	District IV
Croatian Democratic Union (63)	Josip Begonja	District IX, deputizing Nediljko Dujić
Croatian Democratic Union (63)	Anamarija Blažević	District V, deputizing Josip Aladrović
Croatian Democratic Union (63)	Josip Borić	District VIII, deputizing Oleg Butković
Croatian Democratic Union (63)	Dražen Bošnjaković	District VI
Croatian Democratic Union (63)	Luka Brčić	District IX
Croatian Democratic Union (63)	Jure Brkan	District X, deputizing Vili Beroš
Croatian Democratic Union (63)	Ivan Budalić	District X, deputizing Blaženko Boban
Croatian Democratic Union (63)	Majda Burić	District VII, deputizing Tomislav Ćorić
Croatian Democratic Union (63)	Zdravka Bušić	District XI
Croatian Democratic Union (63)	Gari Cappelli	District VIII
Croatian Democratic Union (63)	Ivan Ćelić	District I, deputizing Nina Obuljen Koržinek
Croatian Democratic Union (63)	Pero Ćosić	District V
Croatian Democratic Union (63)	Ante Deur	District II
Croatian Democratic Union (63)	Nadica Dreven Budinski	District III, deputizing Anđelko Stričak
Croatian Democratic Union (63)	Josip Đakić	District IV
Croatian Democratic Union (63)	Mato Franković	District X
Croatian Democratic Union (63)	Maja Grba-Bujević	District VII, deputizing Josip Salapić from HDSSB
Croatian Democratic Union (63)	Damir Habijan	District III
Croatian Democratic Union (63)	Goran Ivanović	District IV, deputizing Nataša Tramišak (2020-2023), Ivan Radić (2023) and Hrvoje Šimić (2023-2024)
Croatian Democratic Union (63)	Gordan Jandroković	District II
Croatian Democratic Union (63)	Marija Jelkovac	District VII, deputizing Tomo Medved
Croatian Democratic Union (63)	Siniša Jenkač	District III
Croatian Democratic Union (63)	Branka Juričev-Martinčev	District IX, deputizing Ivan Malenica
Croatian Democratic Union (63)	Mario Kapulica	District I, deputizing Zvonko Milas
Croatian Democratic Union (63)	Mladen Karlić	District V
Croatian Democratic Union (63)	Krunoslav Katičić	District VI
Croatian Democratic Union (63)	Ivan Kirin	District VIII
Croatian Democratic Union (63)	Tomislav Klarić	District VII
Croatian Democratic Union (63)	Anton Kliman	District VIII
Croatian Democratic Union (63)	Magdalena Komes	District VI, deputizing Ivan Celjak
Croatian Democratic Union (63)	Andro Krstulović Opara	District X
Croatian Democratic Union (63)	Ljubica Lukačić	District I, deputizing Andrej Plenković
Croatian Democratic Union (63)	Ljubica Maksimčuk	District V, deputizing Zdravko Marić
Croatian Democratic Union (63)	Marin Mandarić	District IV, deputizing Josip Škorić
Croatian Democratic Union (63)	Nikola Mažar	District V, deputizing Darko Puljašić
Croatian Democratic Union (63)	Nada Murganić	District VII
Croatian Democratic Union (63)	Tomislav Okroša	District II, deputizing Miroslav Tuđman
Croatian Democratic Union (63)	Marko Pavić	District IV
Croatian Democratic Union (63)	Grozdana Perić	District IX
Croatian Democratic Union (63)	Ivan Radić	District IV
Croatian Democratic Union (63)	Anita Pocrnić-Radošević	District IX, deputizing Marijan Kustić
Croatian Democratic Union (63)	Željko Reiner	District I
Croatian Democratic Union (63)	Ante Sanader	District IX
Croatian Democratic Union (63)	Darko Sobota	District II, deputizing Gordan Grlić-Radman
Croatian Democratic Union (63)	Dražen Srpak	District III, deputizing Darko Horvat
Croatian Democratic Union (63)	Davor Ivo Stier	District VII
Croatian Democratic Union (63)	Josip Šarić	District V, deputizing Mario Banožić
Croatian Democratic Union (63)	Stipan Šašlin	District IV, deputizing Ivan Anušić
Croatian Democratic Union (63)	Rade Šimičević	District IX
Croatian Democratic Union (63)	Hrvoje Šimić	District IV
Croatian Democratic Union (63)	Miro Totgergeli	District II
Croatian Democratic Union (63)	Nataša Tramišak	District IV
Croatian Democratic Union (63)	Žarko Tušek	District III
Croatian Democratic Union (63)	Radoje Vidović	District XI
Croatian Democratic Union (63)	Ankica Zmaić	District V, deputizing Danijel Marušić
Social Democratic Party of Croatia (13)	Mirela Ahmetović	District VIII
Social Democratic Party of Croatia (13)	Barbara Antolić Vupora	District III
Social Democratic Party of Croatia (13)	Boška Ban Vlahek	District III, deputizing independent Matija Posavec
Social Democratic Party of Croatia (13)	Arsen Bauk	District X
Social Democratic Party of Croatia (13)	Sabina Glasovac	District IX
Social Democratic Party of Croatia (13)	Peđa Grbin	District VIII
Social Democratic Party of Croatia (13)	Branko Grčić	District X
Social Democratic Party of Croatia (13)	Siniša Hajdaš Dončić	District III
Social Democratic Party of Croatia (13)	Mišel Jakšić	District II
Social Democratic Party of Croatia (13)	Boris Lalovac	District VI
Social Democratic Party of Croatia (13)	Andreja Marić	District III
Social Democratic Party of Croatia (13)	Sanja Radolović	District VIII
Social Democratic Party of Croatia (13)	Martina Vlašić Iljkić	District V, deputizing Predrag Fred Matić
Social Democrats (11)	Davor Bernardić	District I, elected on SDP list
Social Democrats (11)	Katica Glamuzina	District X, elected on SDP list
Social Democrats (11)	Domagoj Hajduković	District IV, elected on SDP list
Social Democrats (11)	Vesna Nađ	District II, elected on SDP list
Social Democrats (11)	Romana Nikolić	District IV, elected on SDP list
Social Democrats (11)	Željko Pavić	District III, elected on SDP list, deputizing Željko Kolar
Social Democrats (11)	Ivana Posavec Krivec	District VI, elected on SDP list
Social Democrats (11)	Renata Sabljar-Dračevac	District IX, elected on SDP list
Social Democrats (11)	Davorko Vidović	District VI, elected on SDP list
Social Democrats (11)	Franko Vidović	District IX, elected on SDP list
Social Democrats (11)	Nikša Vukas	District I, elected on SDP list
The Bridge (7)	Miro Bulj	District IX
The Bridge (7)	Nikola Grmoja	District VI
The Bridge (7)	Ante Kujundžić	District X
The Bridge (7)	Marin Miletić	District VIII
The Bridge (7)	Božo Petrov	District X
The Bridge (7)	Nino Raspudić	District II
The Bridge (7)	Zvonimir Troskot	District VII
Homeland Movement (5)	Stephen Nikola Bartulica	District VI
Homeland Movement (5)	Davor Dretar	District III
Homeland Movement (5)	Stipo Mlinarić	District IV, deputizing Krešimir Bubalo
Homeland Movement (5)	Ivan Penava	District V
Homeland Movement (5)	Daniel Spajić	District IV, deputizing Mario Radić
We can! (4)	Damir Bakić	District I, member of the Green–Left Bloc club
We can! (4)	Sandra Benčić	District I, member of the Green–Left Bloc club
We can! (4)	Jelena Miloš	District II, member of the Green–Left Bloc club, deputizing Vili Matula
We can! (4)	Urša Raukar-Gamulin	District I, member of the Green–Left Bloc club, deputizing Tomislav Tomašević
Croatian Sovereignists (4)	Marko Milanović Litre	District X, deputizing Ruža Tomašić
Croatian Sovereignists (4)	Marijan Pavliček	District V
Croatian Sovereignists (4)	Željko Sačić	District VI
Croatian Sovereignists (4)	Vesna Vučemilović	District IV
Independent Democratic Serb Party (3)	Dragana Jeckov	Special representative of the Serb minority
Independent Democratic Serb Party (3)	Boris Milošević	Special representative of the Serb minority
Independent Democratic Serb Party (3)	Milorad Pupovac	Special representative of the Serb minority
Istrian Democratic Assembly (2)	Emil Daus	District VIII, deputizing Tulio Demetlika
Istrian Democratic Assembly (2)	Katarina Nemet	District VIII
Croatian Peasant Party (2)	Krešo Beljak	District VII
Croatian Peasant Party (2)	Stjepan Kovač	District III, elected on SDP list
Croatian Social Liberal Party (2)	Dario Hrebak	District II
Croatian Social Liberal Party (2)	Darko Klasić	District I
Croatian Demochristian Party (2)	Goran Dodig	District X, member of the HDZ club
Croatian Demochristian Party (2)	Hrvoje Zekanović	District IX, elected on the DP list
Focus (2)	Damir Bajs	District II
Focus (2)	Dario Zurovec	District VII
Bloc for Croatia (1)	Zlatko Hasanbegović	District I, member of the DP club
Civic Liberal Alliance (1)	Anka Mrak-Taritaš	District I, member of the Centre and GLAS club
Croatian People's Party – Liberal Democrats (1)	Predrag Štromar	District III
Democratic Union of Hungarians of Croatia (1)	Róbert Jankovics	Special representative of the Hungarian minority
Kali Sara (1)	Veljko Kajtazi	Special representative of the Roma and eleven other minorities, member of the Focus club
New Left (1)	Ivana Kekin	District VII, member of the Green–Left Bloc club, deputizing Rada Borić
Centre (1)	Marijana Puljak	District X, member of the Centre and GLAS club
Party with a First Name and Last Name (1)	Dalija Orešković	District I, member of the Centre and GLAS club
People's Party - Reformists (1)	Natalija Martinčević	District III, deputizing Radimir Čačić
Union of Albanians (1)	Ermina Lekaj Prljaskaj	Special representative of the Albanian and four other minorities, member of the HNS and HSU club
Workers' Front (1)	Katarina Peović	District VIII
Rightful Croatia (1)	Milan Vrkljan	District II, elected on the DP list
Determination and Justice (1)	Karolina Vidović Krišto	District IX, elected on the DP list
Croatian Pulse (1)	Ante Prkačin	District VII, elected on the DP list
Independents (18)	Vladimir Bilek	Special representative of Czech and Slovak minorities, member of the HSLS club
Independents (18)	Zvane Brumnić	District VII, elected on SDP list, member of Social Democrats club
Independents (18)	Erik Fabijanić	District VIII, elected on SDP list, member of Social Democrats club
Independents (18)	Bojan Glavašević	District VI, elected from the Green–Left Coalition list
Independents (18)	Vinko Grgić	District V, elected on SDP list
Independents (18)	Silvano Hrelja	District VIII
Independents (18)	Matko Kuzmanić	District IX, elected on SDP list, member of Social Democrats club
Independents (18)	Željko Lenart	District VI, elected on SDP list as HSS member
Independents (18)	Marin Lerotić	District VIII
Independents (18)	Marina Opačak Bilić	District V, elected on SDP list
Independents (18)	Rajko Ostojić	District II, elected on SDP list, member of Social Democrats club
Independents (18)	Marijana Petir	District VI, elected on the HDZ list, member of the club
Independents (18)	Furio Radin	Special representative of the Italian minority, member of the IDS club
Independents (18)	Marija Selak Raspudić	District I, member of The Bridge club
Independents (18)	Irena Šimunić	District VII, elected on SDP list, member of Social Democrats club, deputizing Zlatko Komadina
Independents (18)	Miroslav Škoro	District II, member of the club For Rightful Croatia
Independents (18)	Sanja Udović	District VII, elected on SDP list, member of Social Democrats club
Independents (18)	Ružica Vukovac	District V, member of the club For Rightful Croatia
