= Marko Milanović Litre =

Croatian politician (born 1988)

Member of the Croatian Parliament
- Incumbent
- Assumed office 22 July 2020
- Constituency: District X

Personal details
- Born: 26 January 1988 (age 38) Zagreb, Yugoslavia
- Party: Croatian Sovereignists; Croatian Conservative Party

Marko Milanović Litre (born 26 January 1988) is a Croatian politician. From 2020 to 2024, he was a member of the Croatian Parliament. From 2017 to 2020, Litre served as assistant to Ruža Tomašić. He also serves as general secretary of Oluja Bocce Club.

== Career ==
The youngest of three sons, Litre grew up in Zagreb where he attended Ante Kovačić Elementary School and the Agora High School of Market Communications. In the 2020 parliamentary elections, he became a member of the Croatian Parliament as a substitute for MEP Ruža Tomašić, with 19 preferential votes.

In 2022, Litre defended the rap music group Tram 11 against "cancel culture", arguing that restricting their controversial lyrics threatened free speech. The same year in May, he condemned left-wing parties for attempting to abolish the right to conscientious objection for Croatian doctors, accusing them of selective tolerance. In 2023, Litre criticised columns dismissing the legacy of Ante Starčević, reinforcing his party's push to honor historical figures crucial to Croatian sovereignty.

Following the 2024 parliamentary election, Litre was in public disputes with the State Election Commission (DIP), filing complaints over "stolen votes" after official records did not list preferences for him at his own local voting station where he and his wife had cast their ballots. In 2026, Litre called out mainstream media bias and analysing how local public utility strikes are framed to protect left-wing city leadership.
