= Dreven =

Dreven is a Croatian surname.

== List of people with the surname ==
- Nadica Dreven Budinski (born 1962), Croatian politician
- Saša Dreven (born 1990), Croatian footballer

== See also ==
- van Dreven, Dutch surname
