= Croatian Sovereignists =

Croatian Sovereignists Hrvatski suverenisti
- Abbreviation: HS
- President: Marijan Pavliček
- Honorary president: Ruža Tomašić
- Founded: November 2019
- Merger of: Croatian Conservative Party; Croatian Growth; Generation of Renewal
- Headquarters: Metalčeva ulica, Zagreb
- Ideology: National conservatism: Christian fundamentalism
- Political position: Right-wing to far-right
- National affiliation: Vukovar Coalition (Note: Including DOMiNO, HSP and BLOK) (since 2025)
- European affiliation: ECPM (2021–2022); ECR Party (since 2022)
- European Parliament group: European Conservatives and Reformists Group (2021–2024)
- Colours: Red; White; Blue; Dark blue (customary)
- Sabor: 1 / 151
- European Parliament: 0 / 12
- County Prefects: 0 / 21
- Mayors: 1 / 128

Website
- suverenisti.hr

The Croatian Sovereignists (Croatian: Hrvatski suverenisti or HS) are a conservative and Christian right-wing political party in Croatia. The party was founded in 2019 and is led by Marijan Pavliček, incumbent mayor of Vukovar.

The party grew out of a coalition formed ahead of the 2019 European Parliament election in Croatia by four parties: the Croatian Conservative Party (HKS), the Croatian Growth (Hrast), the Croatian Party of Rights Dr. Ante Starčević (HSP AS), and the United Croatian Patriots (UHD). The coalition finished third and re-elected its list leader, MEP Ruža Tomašić.

== History ==
=== Foundation (2019–2022) ===
The party was formally founded in November 2019 as a political platform between the Croatian Conservative Party (HKS), Croatian Growth (Hrast), and some citizens' initiatives, such as Istina o Istanbulskoj (English: "The Truth about the Istanbul Convention") and Hrvatski bedem. Hrvoje Zekanović was elected the new party's first president.

In the 2020 parliamentary election, the party entered the Sabor (Croatian Parliament) as part of a coalition led by Miroslav Škoro's Homeland Movement. As of 2021, the Croatian Sovereignists had four MPs in the Sabor, who formed their own deputy club. In July 2021, MEP Ruža Tomašić resigned to retire and was replaced by Ladislav Ilčić. After split with the Homeland Movement, MPs Miroslav Škoro and Vesna Vučemilović (his sister) joined the Sovereignists' deputy club as independents.

On 2 October 2021, the party held a unification assembly in Zagreb during which it was announced that HKS, Hrast and the Generation of Renewal (GO), three smaller conservative and right-wing parties, will become defunct to merge and work together as the Croatian Sovereignists. Marijan Pavliček became the new leader of the party. Following the dissolution of Hrast, which was a member of the European Christian Political Movement (ECPM), Sovereignists became a member party of the ECPM in 2021.

On 17 December, the presidency of the Croatian Sovereignists launched proceedings to expel Hrvoje Zekanović, its former leader and a member of Parliament, from the party. A week earlier, Zekanović gave a speech in the Croatian Parliament in which he was supportive of Covid-19 vaccination and critically called out his right-wing colleagues on this issue, which was followed by his removal from the position of chairman of the party's parliamentary club. On 19 January 2022, Zekanović was officially expelled from the party.

In 2022, HS changed its europarty affiliation by joining the European Conservatives and Reformists Party (ECR Party), of which HKS had previously been a member.

==== "Protect the Croatian Kuna" initiative ====
After Andrej Plenković (HDZ), the Prime Minister of Croatia, announced that he expects Croatia to join the eurozone by the beginning of 2023, the Croatian Sovereignists launched a campaign called "Protect the Croatian Kuna" (Croatian: Zaštitimo hrvatsku kunu). Hrvoje Zekanović announced that the Sovereignists will start collecting signatures for a referendum and claimed that "not a single citizen of the Republic of Croatia out of two-thirds who voted for the EU knew that we had committed ourselves to introduce the euro within a certain period of time, i.e. enter the eurozone." Sovereignist Member of Parliament Marijan Pavliček argued in a parliament speech that: "such an important topic where part of the sovereignty is lost, in this case monetary sovereignty, cannot be decided by individuals in their offices after an agreement with the powers in Brussels. On this topic only the Croatian people can decide through a referendum."

The initiative was also supported by the Croatian Party of Rights, the Independents for Croatia, and Generation of Renewal.

On 24 October 2021, the "Protect the Croatian Kuna" initiative started collecting signatures demanding a referendum. The party's MP Marko Milanović Litre announced that 157,000 signatures were collected after five days. For a referendum on the subject, the initiative needed to gather 368,867 signatures by 7 November 2021. After the collection of signatures was over, the Sovereignists announced that they had collected 334,582 valid signatures, which was not enough to call a referendum.

=== 2023–present ===
In July 2023, it was announced that the party formed a pre-election coalition with The Bridge (Most) to jointly run in the 2024 Croatian parliamentary election. The two parties, led by Most MP Nikola Grmoja as their candidate for prime minister, presented their coalition lists in all eleven electoral districts and were joined by the Independent Youth List (NLM) in districts IX and X. In the election on 17 April 2024, the coalition finished in fifth place, winning eight percent of the vote and eleven seats in the Sabor, two of which went to HS.

On 23 April, a week after the parliamentary election, the Sovereignists presented its joint list with The Bridge (Most) and far-right Croatian Party of Rights (HSP) for the 9 June European Parliament election, with Most leader Božo Petrov as the top candidate. The parties ran on a christian right and social conservative platform, putting forward their initiative Vratimo EU kršćanskim korijenima (English: "Let's return the EU to its Christian roots"). Incumbent MEP Ladislav Ilčić refused to run in the election in a coalition with Most, leaving the Sovereignists and forming his own independent list ahead of the election. The Most–HS–HSP coalition failed to reach the 5 percent electoral threshold, with Croatian Sovereignists not managing to retain the seat they won in the 2019 EP election.

Ahead of the December presidential election, the party chose to co-endorse three presidential candidates. The candidates they supported were Miro Bulj (Most), Branka Lozo (DOMiNO) and independent candidate Tomislav Jonjić. In December, the party formed a joint deputy club with Home and National Rally (DOMiNO) in the Sabor.

In the 2025 local elections, the Croatian Sovereignists won the mayorship of Vukovar. The party leader and mayoral candidate Marijan Pavliček, supported also by DOMiNO, defeated the candidate of the governing Homeland Movement (DP) and Croatian Democratic Union (HDZ) in the second round on June 1. Pavliček succeeded DP leader Ivan Penava in the position, with DP losing their stronghold. Sovereignists and DOMiNO formed a majority in the Vukovar City Council in an agreement with HDZ. In October, Pavliček was re-elected as party leader.

On 9 December 2025 in Vukovar, the party signed a cooperation agreement with Home and National Rally, Croatian Party of Rights and Bloc for Croatia in order to run together in the next parliamentary election. The pact has been dubbed the 'Vukovar coalition' (Croatian: Vukovarska koalicija) in the media, which is used as a working title. The parties ran together in the 2026 Split district elections, winning six seats in four of the districts.

== Program ==
On its website, the party names:

- national sovereignty
- self-sustainability
- Christian values
- personal freedoms

as its program guidelines.

== Election results ==
=== Legislative ===
Election	In coalition with	Votes won	Percentage	Seats won	Change	Government?
Election	In coalition with	(Coalition totals)		(Croatian Sovereignists only)		Government?
2020	DPMŠ-led coalition	181,492	10.89 (#3)	4 / 151	New	Opposition
2024	Most-led coalition	169,988	8.02 (#5)	2 / 151	▼2	Opposition

=== European Parliament ===
Election	List leader	Coalition	Votes	%	Seats	+/–	EP Group
Election	List leader	Coalition	Coalition		HS		EP Group
2019 (Note: As the coalition of HRAST, HKS, HSP AS and UHD bearing the same name of the current party.)	Ruža Tomašić	None	91,546	8.52 (#3)	1 / 12	New	ECR
2024	Božo Petrov	MOST–HSP	30,155	4.01 (#7)	0 / 12	▼1	–

== See also ==
- List of political parties in Croatia
