= Lugovi =

Lugovi may refer to:

== Places ==
- Lugovi, Maglaj, a village without population in municipality of Maglaj, Bosnia and Herzegovina.
- Lugovi, Pljevlja, a hamlet in the municipality of Pljevlja, Montenegro.
