= Red Action / Red Initiative =

Far-left political organization in Croatia and Serbia

Red Action / Red Initiative Crvena akcija / Crvena inicijativa
- Abbreviation: CA/CI
- Leader: Collective leadership
- Founded: 17 February 2020 (merger) June 2002 in Belgrade, Serbia as Red Initiative; October 2008 in Zagreb, Croatia as Red Action
- Merger of: Crvena akcija (Croatia) and Crvena inicijativa (Serbia)
- Membership: 157
- Ideology: Communism; Marxism–Leninism; Anti-imperialism
- Political position: Far-left

Website
- crvena.org

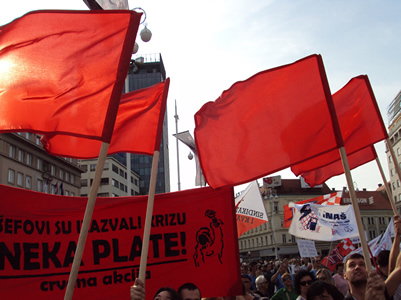
Trade-union demonstration in September 2009

Red Action / Red Initiative (Serbo-Croatian: Crvena akcija / Crvena inicijativa) is a communist political organization active in Croatia (initially as Red Action) and Serbia (initially as Red Initiative). As a self-proclaimed anti-imperialist organization, it strongly opposes the North Atlantic Treaty Organization (NATO) and is known for attacking NATO symbols with red paint. It also considers the European Union to be an instrument for Western European imperialism and exploitation of Eastern Europe, along with the rest of the world.

== History ==
During the 2009 Israel-Gaza conflict, Red Action organized a protest of solidarity with Palestinians together with the Muslim community in Zagreb. It supports LGBT rights and is an active participant in Zagreb Pride events. Red Action attends workers' protests and is highly critical of trade union officials. This organization was an active participant in the 2009 student protests in Croatia and was described by the media as one of key organizers during the 2011 anti-government protests in Croatia.

Internationally, Red Action supports guerrilla movements such as the Revolutionary Armed Forces of Colombia, the Popular Front for the Liberation of Palestine, the Democratic Front for the Liberation of Palestine, the Kurdistan Workers' Party, and the Naxalites. They also supported the 2008 Greek riots and have participated in protests of solidarity with Serbian anarchists accused of attacking Belgrade's Greek embassy during an anti-NATO protest in 2011.

In 2020, Red Action merged with the Serbian organisation Red Initiative (Crvena inicijativa) to form Red Action/Red Initiative (Crvena akcija / Crvena inicijativa). It supported the 2024–present Serbian anti-corruption protests.

== See also ==
- Socialist Labour Party of Croatia
- Workers' Front (Croatia)
