= Ladislav Ilčić =

Croatian politician (born 1970)

Member of the European Parliament
- In office 1 July 2021 – 16 July 2024

Personal details
- Born: Ladislav Ilčić; 4 August 1970 (age 55) Varaždin, Croatia, Yugoslavia
- Party: Hrast (2012–2021); Sovereignists (2019–2024)

Ladislav Ilčić (born 4 August 1970), is a Croatian politician and former violinist who served as a Member of the European Parliament from 2021 until 2024.

== Biography ==
Ladislav Ilčić was born in Varaždin on 4 August 1970.

His father, Stanko Ilčić, is a doctor and former director of the Varaždin Health Center, also known as the leader of the Varaždin church choir Chorus liturgicus and a longtime associate of the Varaždin diocese.

He graduated from the Academy of Music in Zagreb, where he later completed his postgraduate studies, specializing in playing the violin. He joined the permanent ensemble of the symphony orchestra of the state radio and television broadcaster HRT. He was an occasional member of the mariachi band "El Combo".

In 2006 he co-founded, and in 2008 he became the chairman of the organization working for children "GROZD". He also became an instructor of pre-marriage courses. He was one of the initiators of the mass campaign to collect signatures for referendum which would create a constitutional prohibition against same-sex marriage.

He is the president of the Oak Party - Movement for a Successful Croatia (Hrast), which brings together political parties, civic associations and individuals traditionally, conservatively, nationally and democratically Christian. He was the holder of the Oak list in the first Croatian elections for the European Parliament in 2013. In the same year, he was the Oak candidate in the elections for the mayor of Varaždin, where he won fourth place with 7.89% of the vote.

He was the president of the Committee for Education, Health and Social Welfare in the Varaždin City Council.

He then introduced his party to the Patriotic Coalition established around the Croatian Democratic Union. From the list in the 2015 elections, Ilčić was elected a member of the Croatian Parliament. He sat in the Croatian parliament until 2016. Later, he did not achieve success in elections within the committees organized by right-wing parties.

On 1 July 2021, Ilčić became a Member of the European Parliament to replace Ruža Tomašić, who had resigned.
