= Workers' Front (Croatia) =

Croatian political party

Workers' Front Radnička fronta
- Abbreviation: RF
- Leader: Collective leadership
- Founded: 9 May 2014
- Registered: 20 March 2015
- Ideology: Democratic socialism Social progressivism Labour rights Anti-fascism; Anti-clericalism; Eco-socialism; Left-wing populism Antimilitarism
- Political position: Left-wing to far-left
- National affiliation: Green–Left Coalition (2017–2020); Rivers of Justice (2024)
- European affiliation: Party of the European Left
- Colours: Red and white
- Sabor: 0 / 151
- European Parliament: 0 / 12
- County Prefects: 0 / 21
- Mayors: 0 / 128

Website
- radnickafronta.hr

The Workers' Front (Croatian: Radnička fronta, RF) is a democratic socialist and progressive political party in Croatia. Formed in May 2014 as a political initiative of workers, trade unionists, unemployed, and students in Croatia, it supports anti-clericalism, anti-fascism, antimilitarism, eco-socialism, labour rights, progressivism, and socialist feminism. Some left-libertarian and Trotskyist (International Socialist Alternative) critics characterize it as left-wing populist in the mold of Podemos and SYRIZA.

The RF is a full member of the Party of the European Left. It also cooperates closely with other left-wing political parties and organizations in the countries of former Yugoslavia, such as The Left in Slovenia and The Left in North Macedonia.

== Objectives and ideology ==
The Workers' Front has been compared to Spanish Podemos and Greek SYRIZA by the local and regional media.

The party summarizes the basis of its political programme, Democratic socialism for the 21st century (Demokratski socijalizam 21. stoljeća), as a socialist triangle of social ownership, social production and the focus of production on the needs of all. Its programme takes heavy inspiration from the resurgence of democratic socialism in mainstream politics in the West (see millennial socialism).

The party came under critique for lacking a clearly defined ideology — apart from the general idea of creating a "broad left-wing front". Various public statements by the party members, such as that in support of both the Nordic model and the socialism of the 21st century as established in Venezuela, contributed to ambiguousness of its ideological orientation. For example, a party candidate running in the 8th electoral unit, Ljiljana Nikolovska, described her view on democratic socialism in an interview with a local news site Glas Istre as follows:

I don't espouse socialism, but rather the modern democratic socialism of the Scandinavian or New Zealand type, which we can observe in all developed countries in combination with regulated private capital and social democracy, where the health of society, that is, the majority, is given priority.

— Workers' Front candidate Ljiljana Nikolovska, Glas Istre

=== Social, civil and environmental issues ===
The party considers modern-day Croatia to not be a fully independent country, describing the country as a quasi-colony due to what it opines is the unfavorable economic relationship of Croatia with Western Europe, while at the same time praising SR Croatia for having a higher level of independence. It blames Franjo Tuđman for this described loss of independence. At the same time it has stated that while the League of Communists of Croatia had "positive elements", the RF was critical of the party, as they consider it only represented an "enlightened elite" as opposed to the mass of party members as a whole in a "democratic" way.

Workers' Front aims to become a broad progressive front, dedicated to radical change of political, economic and social relations, while fighting for the rights of working people and all the oppressed.

Workers' Front is trying to coordinate various "progressive struggles" – struggle for workers' rights and economic democracy, anti-capitalism, anti-fascism, struggle for women's and LGBT rights, ecology etc.

While the party has expressed the opinion that nationalism is not inherently a bad influence, it is critical of what it deems to be the "revisionist nationalism" of Croatia's leaders, which it links to the "genocidal extremes" during World War 2.

=== Economic policy ===
The party categorically rejects the privatization carried out in Croatia during the 1990s, as it considers the process both incompatible with Croatian laws at the time, as well as a social injustice. It has declared a goal to undo all privatizations in which there were "irregularities". It is also opposed to capitalism, with the party statute describing the party as one “that gathers workers, activists, trade unionists, unemployed, students and pensioners with the aim of building a broad anti-capitalist front, dedicated to the radical change of political and economic relations in the benefit of all the oppressed and those who live from their work.”

The Workers' Front demands the return of quotas for foreign workers in Croatia which were abolished in 2021. The party's representative in the 10th Sabor, Katarina Peović, asserted that the abolishment of quotas enabled the lowering of the price of labor and thus ensured "slave-like working and living conditions". She opposed the ruling government's narrative that there is a 'lack of workers' and added that "17.6 percent of the working population has emigrated from this country".

=== Foreign policy ===
The party has stated that while it does not oppose the idea of a "united Europe", it opposes the European Union on the grounds that it believes the organization enforces a neoliberal economic policy in Europe, which it deems is a cause for both economic inequality within the member states themselves, as well as between member states.

The RF opposes Croatian membership in NATO, which it deems to be linked to American imperialism.

It supports cooperation with the countries of the former Yugoslavia and has explicitly condemned the HDZ's involvement in Bosnia and Herzegovina, which it describes as "clientelism". It has come out in opposition to the rivalry and separation between Serbs and Croats, which it blames on the right-wing.

=== Immigration ===
The RF blames the immigration pressure under which Croatia is under on unequal national development caused by capitalism. It opposes military measures taken against immigration, as it believes doing so only makes Croatia a "military province" dedicated to protecting EU borders at the cost of the nation's own independence.

== History ==
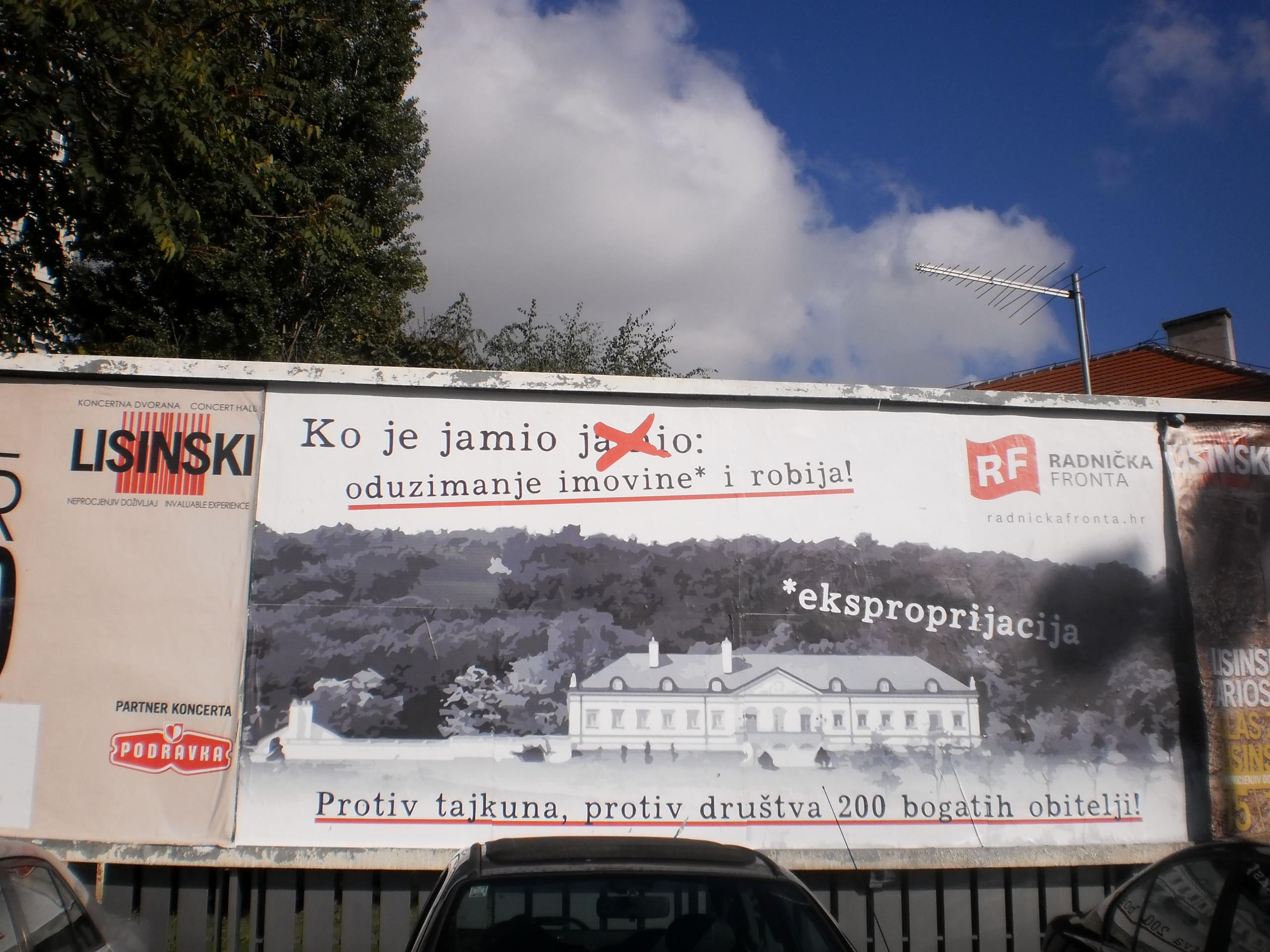
Billboard poster set up by the Workers' Front for 2015 Croatian parliamentary elections

On 3 October 2015 it was announced on the Workers' Front web site that the party has been disbanded after an attempted purge by a prominent member of the party. However, Workers' Front remained an officially registered party and went on with its activities, issuing a statement that its web site was taken over by a group trying to disband the party. Two weeks later this version of events, namely that the party still exists and that the web site was in control of a group of dissidents, was confirmed by a member of the dissident group.

Following this episode, Workers' Front participated in an anticlerical protest in Zagreb, tried to place, but was denied a billboard featuring Ivica Todorić (the richest person in Croatia) and successfully registered for 2015 parliamentary election in three electoral districts.

In the following months, the party helped organize an antifascist demonstration against far-right groups celebrating the Nazi collaborator in Croatia, Ante Pavelić, during a church mass for Pavelić. The protest was assaulted by supporters of the Croatian far-right. Soon after that, Workers' Front staged the first organized cutting of the razor wire planted along the Croatia-Slovenia border, together with Slovenian activists in a cross-border demonstration of solidarity. The action was widely reported by regional media.

On 1 February 2016 the Workers' Front held a protest against the new government, particularly Minister of Culture Zlatko Hasanbegović, on St. Mark's Square, Zagreb with over 1000 participants.

In March 2017, Workers' Front announced their coalition with New Left for the then-upcoming local elections in Split and Zagreb. In Zagreb election Workers' Front ran in coalition with Zagreb is OURS, New Left, Sustainable Development of Croatia and For the City which won 7.64% votes and 4 seats in the Zagreb City Assembly, one of which belonged to the Workers' Front. In Split election, the Workers' Front-New Left coalition won 4.36% of votes, failing to enter the city council.

On 8 September 2018, the Workers' Front signed a declaration of mutual cooperation with New Left, Sustainable Development of Croatia and the Socialist Labor Party of Croatia in the City of Šibenik, Croatia. The Šibenik Declaration (Croatian: Šibenska deklaracija) contains various criticisms of Croatian society, as well as that of the current capitalist system in general, on which all the signatories agree on and gather around. The Workers' Front, however, had implemented an article in the document which was signed only by themselves as the other parties found it unappealing for their programmes; it reads as follows:

Radical change demands the dismantling of the irreconcilable opposites between the two basic classes - the capitalists (those that hold a monopoly on the means of production - banks, corporations, factories, trade centers, hotels, etc. - and make their profit on the labor of others) and the workers (those that sell their labor to survive).

This policy takes it as necessary: reindustrialization in the interest of all; guarantee of workplaces; encouragement of industrial policy that puts in motion and connects the various industrial branches; monetary and fiscal policy in function of industry; the implementation of workers' self-management and participation in their workplaces, no matter their ownership.

Democracy must stop being a phrase under which capital conceals its dictatorship and must become social reality under which the interests of the working peoples are realised. Hence, it is necessary to halt all privatisation of public services and goods, and to nationalize all the fundamental resources of public importance by placing the control of the services in the hands of the workers, the people.

— Workers' Front, The Šibenik Declaration

On 18 December 2018, the Workers' Front announced Katarina Peović's bid for the president of Croatia in the upcoming 2019–20 elections. Official presentation of the candidate and her program happened on 21 January 2019. She ran under the slogan "Za narodnu većinu, a ne bogatu manjinu!" (transl. "For the popular majority, not the rich minority!").

In May 2020, the Workers' Front joined the Green–Left Coalition in the 2020 Croatian parliamentary election in which they together won 7 seats in the Croatian Parliament (Sabor), with Katarina Peović elected after leading the list in the VIIIth electoral district. In December 2020, Workers' Front was expelled from the Green–Left Coalition over conflicts with other parties, including the refusal of other coalition parties to stand behind Peović's candidature for the Mayor of Rijeka in the upcoming 2021 local elections, which Tomislav Tomašević of the largest coalition party We Can! perceived as an ultimatum put forward by the Workers' Front.

The Workers' Front was one of the 11 left-wing and liberal opposition parties that organized the 2024 Zagreb protest. In March 2024, the party briefly became part of the Rivers of Justice coalition but dropped out of it within the same month. Workers' Front failed to achieve the 5% electoral threshold in the 2024 Croatian parliamentary election, leaving the party without a representative in the Croatian Parliament.

== Election results ==
=== Parliament of Croatia ===
Year	Popular vote (coalition)	% of popular vote	Overall seats won	Seat change	Coalition	Government
2015	6,194	0.41%	0 / 151	New	—	Extra-parliamentary
2020	116,480	6.99%	1 / 151	▲1	Green–Left	Opposition
2024	16,869	0.80%	0 / 151	▼1	—	Extra-parliamentary

=== European Parliament ===
Election	List leader	Coalition	Votes	%	Seats	+/–	EP Group
Election	List leader	Coalition	Coalition		RF		EP Group
2019	Katarina Peović	SRP	2,622	0.24 (#22)	0 / 12	New	–
2024	Katarina Peović	None	4,729	0.63 (#10)	0 / 12	0	–

=== Zagreb City Assembly ===
Year	Popular vote (coalition)	% of popular vote	Overall seats won	Seat change	Coalition	Government
2017	24,706	7.64%	1 / 51	▲1	Green–Left	Opposition
2021	1,385	0.43%	0 / 47	▼1	—	Extra-Parliamentary

=== President of Croatia ===
Election	Candidate	Rank	1st round votes	% of votes	Rank	2nd round votes	% of votes
2019–20	Katarina Peović	8th	21,387	1.14%	—N/a		

== See also ==
- Left-wing politics in Croatia
- Red Action / Red Initiative
- Socialist Labour Party of Croatia
