= Anita Pocrnić-Radošević =

Croatian politician (born 1973)

Member of the Croatian Parliament
- Incumbent
- Assumed office 22 July 2020

Personal details
- Born: 23 September 1973 (age 53) Gospić, Yugoslavia (now Croatia)
- Party: Croatian Democratic Union
- Education: University of Rijeka

Anita Pocrnić-Radošević (born 23 September 1973) is a Croatian politician from the Croatian Democratic Union who served as a member of the Croatian Parliament.

== See also ==
- List of members of the Sabor, 2020–
