= Gordan Bosanac =

Croatian politician (born 1973)

Gordan Bosanac MEP
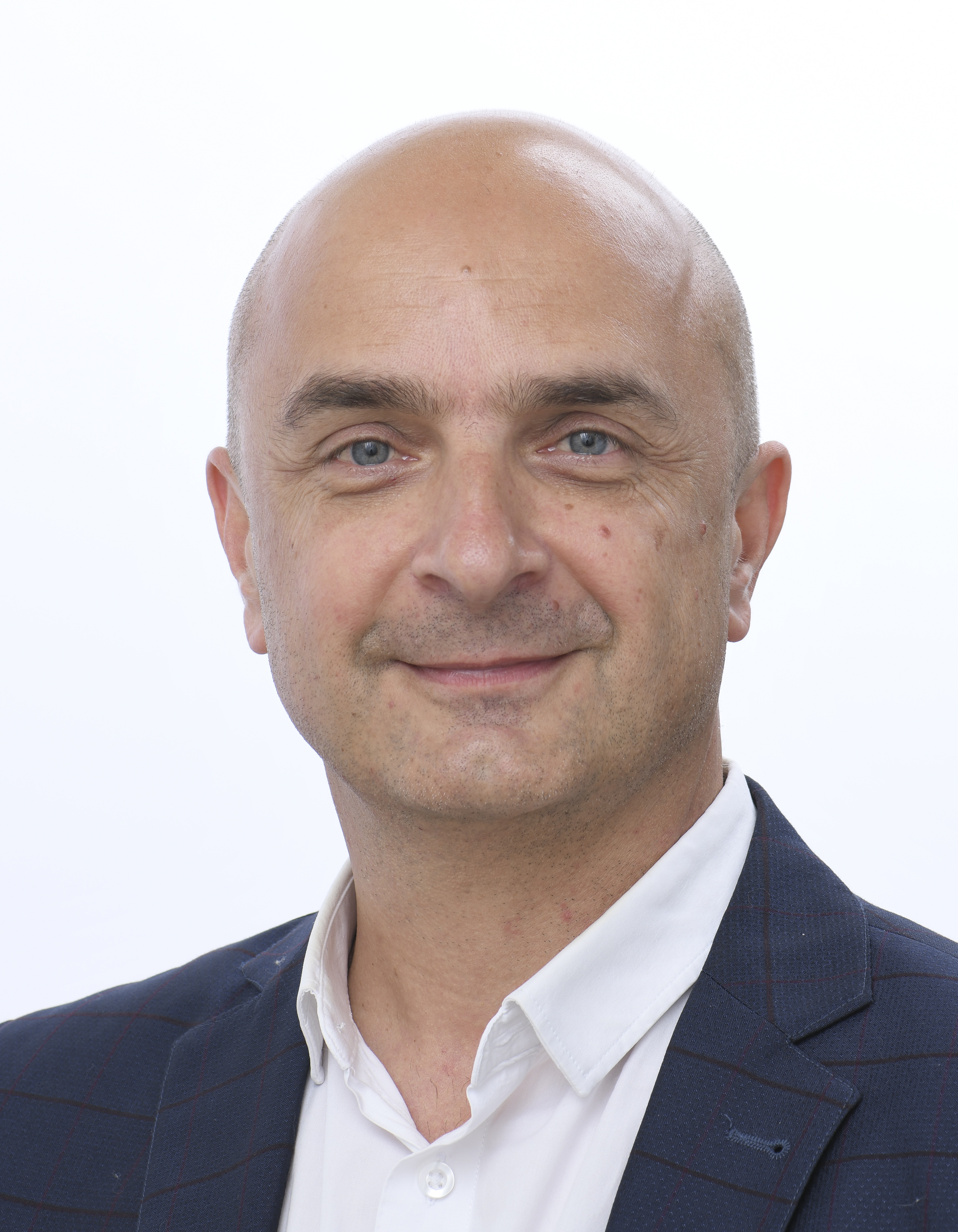

Member of the European Parliament for Croatia
- Incumbent
- Assumed office 16 July 2024

Member of the Croatian parliament
- In office 16 May 2024 – 12 July 2024

Personal details
- Born: September 18, 1973 (age 53) Zagreb, SR Croatia, SFR Yugoslavia (modern Croatia)
- Party: Croatian; We Can! EU; Greens–European Free Alliance
- Education: University of Zagreb; University College London

Gordan Bosanac (born 18 September 1973) is a Croatian politician currently serving as a Member of the European Parliament for Croatia since the 2024 election. He sits in the Greens–European Free Alliance group.

Bosanac worked in the non-governmental sector until 2019, when he was involved in the founding of the We Can! political platform. From 2020 to 2023, he served as the secretary of the platform's parliamentary group in the Croatian Parliament (Sabor), and as the platform's spokesperson until 2024. In the 2021 local elections, he was also elected to the Zagreb Assembly. At the 2024 parliamentary elections, he was elected a member of the Parliament, but left just two months later to become a Member of the European Parliament.

== Early life and education ==
Bosanac was born on 18 September 1973, in Zagreb. He graduated as Master of Engineering in Physics at the Faculty of Science, University of Zagreb in 1999. In 2004 he also completed a master's degree in Human Rights at University College London.

== Professional career ==
Bosanac began his career as a scientific researcher at the Ruđer Bošković Institute from 2000 to 2004. From 2000 until 2019 he worked as Programme Director and later as Head Policy Analyst at the Centre for Peace Studies (CMS), focusing on LGBT rights, migration, rule of law and security (notably civilian control over the police and armed forces, and the right to conscientious objection). He took part in organising the first Zagreb Pride in 2002.

From 2018 to 2020, he also worked as a freelance consultant, advising organizations on human rights, strategy, and communication.

== Political career ==
In 2019, Bosanac co-founded the political platform We Can!. Following the party's entry into the Croatian Parliament after the 2020 parliamentary election, he served as the secretary of the parliamentary group until 2023 and as the party's spokesperson until 2024. In the 2021 local elections, he was also elected to the Zagreb Assembly, where he presided over the City Coordination for Human Rights and the Assembly Committee for Safety and Prevention of Urban Risks.

In the 2024 parliamentary election, Bosanac was elected as a member of the Croatian Parliament, representing the Electoral District VI. However, he resigned after the European Parliament election to assume the role of Member of the European Parliament. As an MEP, he serves on the Committee on Regional Development. He is also a substitute member of the Committee on Employment and Social Affairs, the Committee on Petitions, and the Special Committee on the Housing Crisis in the EU. He is a member of the Delegation to the EU-North Macedonia Joint Parliamentary Committee and the Delegation for relations with Bosnia and Herzegovina and Kosovo.

== Political positions and personal life ==
In February 2024, as a member of the Croatian Parliament, Bosanac called for the Croatian Government to recognize the State of Palestine.

He stated that due to the We Can!'s so-called party tax, as an MEP, he will return more than 50 percent of his monthly income to the party.

Bosanac voted against the Von der Leyen Commission II, stating that "part of the assembled majority does not respect the rule of law, does not believe in gender equality, spreads conspiracy theories, and does not support a secular Europe."

Bosanac is openly gay.
