= Lugovi, Maglaj =

Village in Maglaj, Bosnia and Herzegovina

Lugovi
- Village
- Location within Bosnia and Herzegovina
- Coordinates: 44°31′31″N 17°59′19″E
- Country: Bosnia and Herzegovina
- Entity: Republika Srpska; Federation of Bosnia and Herzegovina
- Region Canton: Doboj; Zenica-Doboj
- Municipality: Teslić; Maglaj

Area
  - Total: 0.63 sq mi (1.63 km^{2})

Population (2013)
  - Total: 14
  - Density: 22/sq mi (8.6/km^{2})
- Time zone: UTC+1 (CET)
  - Summer (DST): UTC+2 (CEST)

Lugovi is a small village near populated village Mladoševica in the municipalities of Teslić (Republika Srpska) and Maglaj, Zenica-Doboj Canton, Federation of Bosnia and Herzegovina, Bosnia and Herzegovina. It is located where river Domislica River is merging with it tributary Kućetinska Rijeka.

== Demographics ==
According to the 2013 census, its population was 14, all living in the Teslić part thus none in the Maglaj part.

Ethnicity in 2013
Ethnicity	Number	Percentage
Croats	6	42.9%
Serbs	4	28.6%
other/undeclared	4	28.6%
Total	14	100%
