= Srđan Gjurković =

Croatian politician

Srđan Gjurković (born 25 September 1964) is a Croatian politician serving as President of the Finance and Central Budget Committee. His mandate in the Croatian Parliament started in 2011, when he was elected as the representative from the Xth constituency. Left-centre oriented, he is a member of the Croatian People's Party – Liberal Democrats.

A common question is about the pronunciation of his surname Gjurković (Gjurkovich). His rule is to 'read it like it's written': Serd͡ Gyoorcoʋeach.

In addition to the duties he has as a Member of the Croatian Parliament, he is the Finance and Central Budget Committee President and President of the Commission on Fiscal Policy. He is also a member of the Legislation Committee and, as Chairman of the Fiscal Policy Commission, a member of the supervisory board of the Croatian Bank for Reconstruction and Development. He is also a member of the Governing Council of the State Agency for Deposit Insurance and Bank Rehabilitation. Also, he is elected councilman of the Split City Council.

== Life and education ==
Srđan was born on September 28, 1964, in Zagreb, his family returned to Split the same year and he was enrolled in kindergarten there and subsequently Ruđer Bošković Elementary School. He attended Industrial Mechanical-Naval High School for two years, and spent a further two years at the School for Tourism and Catering from which he graduated with a Travel Agent degree.

After high school, he enrolled in the Faculty of Economics in Split and graduated in 1990. During his studies he was a member of the student organization AIESEC. Acquiring new knowledge and skills were a motivator to enroll and complete the postgraduate specialist study of Financial management in 2003 at the same university where he gained the "Master Specialist" title.

At the time of the creation of an independent Croatian state, during the Croatian War of Independence, he was a member of the defence forces in the Southern front.

== Business career ==
From 1990 to 1996, he worked in the sector for domestic and foreign trade of Brodomerkur Ltd., after which, together with partners, he founded the company SEM Trading Ltd., where he obtained the functions of director and co-owner from 1996 to 2000. He held the position of CEO of SEM PPC Inc. from 2000 to 2002, and the position of president of the company Regional Wholesale Market Split Inc. from 2003 to 2008.

He is a licensed HANFA and insurance broker and has held the position of executive director at the company AAR Ltd. where he dealt with insurance brokerage.

From 2010 to 2011 he worked as CEO of SEM.

Since 2011 he has held the position of Member of Parliament of the Republic of Croatia, where he is a president and member of several important committees.

== Political engagement ==
In addition to experience in the business sector, he also has political experience. As early as 1991 he joined the Croatian People's Party - Liberal Democrats, inspired, like many others, with the creation of the Croatian state, independence and the beginning of democracy.

As a member of the ruling coalition he is a councilman in Split City Council since 2013. He was a councilman in Split-Dalmatia County Assembly for two mandates; from 2005 to 2009 and from 2009 to 2012, as well as a councilor in district Spinut in Split from 2010 to 2012.

In addition to the duties he has as a Member of 7th Term of Croatian Parliament he is President of the Finance and Central Budget Committee and also President of the Commission on Fiscal Policy. He is a member of the Legislation Committee and as Chairman of the Fiscal Policy Commission a member of the supervisory board of the Croatian Bank for Reconstruction and Development, member of the Governing Council of the State Agency for Deposit Insurance and Bank Rehabilitation and also councilman of the City Council of the City of Split.

Within the Croatian People's Party - Liberal Democrats he was the president of the Split-Dalmatia County organisation for two mandates: from 2004 to 2008 and from 2008 to 2012. Currently, he holds the position of the President of the Dalmatian regional association and a member of the Presidency of the HNS since 2008.

== Themes of his politics ==
The main emphasis of his political actions are towards finance, sports, science and the economy, increase of social awareness and development.

As Chairman of the Parliamentary Finance Committee he has been actively working to solve the problem of loans in Swiss francs. In this work he communicates with civil association "Franak" and thus has contact with not only the institutions, but also to the citizens, something he seeks to accomplish through his entire work.

He played a major role in the initiation and final amendment changes of the Sports' Law. He received this initiative from the civil association, Naš Hajduk, after which he started to collect the number of signatures required to initiate emergency procedures and the process of making amendments to the law.

Another joint initiative with the association Naš Hajduk was organizing a round table in Parliament, "Aid in Sport - EU regulations," where they gathered domestic and foreign experts who spoke on the topic from experiences within their own countries.

Besides being involved in politics, he uses his position and media interest to highlight the problems of civil associations. Being a long-time supporter of such an association in Split, his goal is to highlight the problems of location and funding organisations, as well as highlighting their projects. Additional points of interest are science and the economy, in particular projects that can be realised through the cooperation of industries and universities.

At the beginning of 2014, he started with a long-term project of meeting with citizens in his office in Parliament and the party headquarters in Split.
