= Ivana Posavec Krivec =

Croatian politician (born 1975)

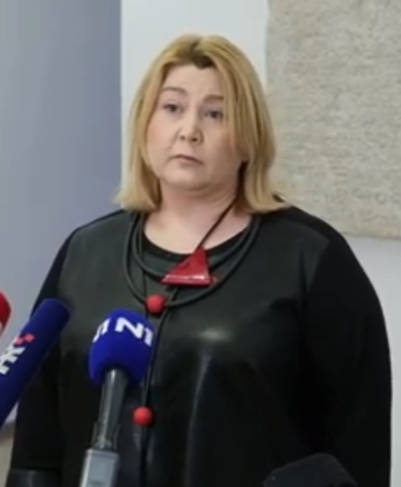
- At a press conference in 2021
- Born: 17 September 1975; Zagreb, Croatia
- Occupation: Politician
- Political party: Social Democrats

Ivana Posavec Krivec (born 17 September 1975) is a Croatian politician. She was a member of the Croatian Parliament for the Social Democrats.

== See also ==
- List of members of the Sabor, 2020–2024
