= Nadica Dreven Budinski =

Croatian politician (born 1962)

Member of the Croatian Parliament
- In office 18 June 2021 – 7 June 2023

Personal details
- Born: 1 November 1962 (age 62); Sveti Ilija, Varaždin County
- Political party: Croatian Democratic Union

Nadica Dreven Budinski (born 1 November 1962) is a Croatian politician from the Croatian Democratic Union who served as a member of the Croatian Parliament.

== See also ==
- List of members of the Sabor, 2020–2024
