= Croatian Conservative Party =

Croatian Conservative Party Hrvatska konzervativna stranka
- President: Marijan Pavliček
- Secretary: Denis Bevanda
- Founder: Ruža Tomašić
- Founded: 20 November 2014
- Dissolved: 2 October 2021
- Split from: Croatian Party of Rights dr. Ante Starčević
- Merged into: Croatian Souverainists
- Headquarters: Zagreb, Croatia
- Ideology: Croatian nationalism Conservative liberalism Soft Euroscepticism; Souverainism; National conservatism Right-wing populism
- Political position: Right-wing
- National affiliation: Croatian Souverainists (2019–2021)
- European affiliation: European Conservatives and Reformists Party
- Colours: Dark blue
- Sabor: 0 / 151
- European Parliament: 0 / 12

Website
- konzervativci.hr

The Croatian Conservative Party (Croatian: Hrvatska konzervativna stranka or HKS) was a conservative political party in Croatia. Last president of the party was Marijan Pavliček. It was founded on 20 November 2014.

It joined the Alliance of European Conservatives and Reformists (now Alliance of Conservatives and Reformists in Europe) in May 2015. Its sole MEP has been a member of the European Conservatives and Reformists since the party's foundation.

On October 2, 2021, a unification assembly was held in Croatia's capital Zagreb. During the assembly it was announced, that three smaller conservative and right-wing parties (Croatian Conservative Party, Hrast-Movement for Successful Croatia and the Generation of Renewal) will become defunct to merge and work together as the Croatian Sovereignists.

== Election results ==
=== Legislative ===
Election	In coalition with	Votes won	Percentage	Seats won	Change	Government
Election	In coalition with	(Coalition totals)		(HKS only)		Government
2015	HSP–OS	13,980	0.6	0 / 151	New	Extra-parliamentary
2016	HDSSB	23,573	1.25	0 / 151	0	Extra-parliamentary
2020	DPMŠ	181,492	10.89	2 / 151	▲2	Opposition

=== European parliament ===
Election year	In coalition with	# of total votes	% of overall vote	# of seats won	Rank
2019	HRAST-HSP AS-UHD	91,546	8,52%	1 / 12	3
