= Katarina Peović =

Croatian politician (born 1974)

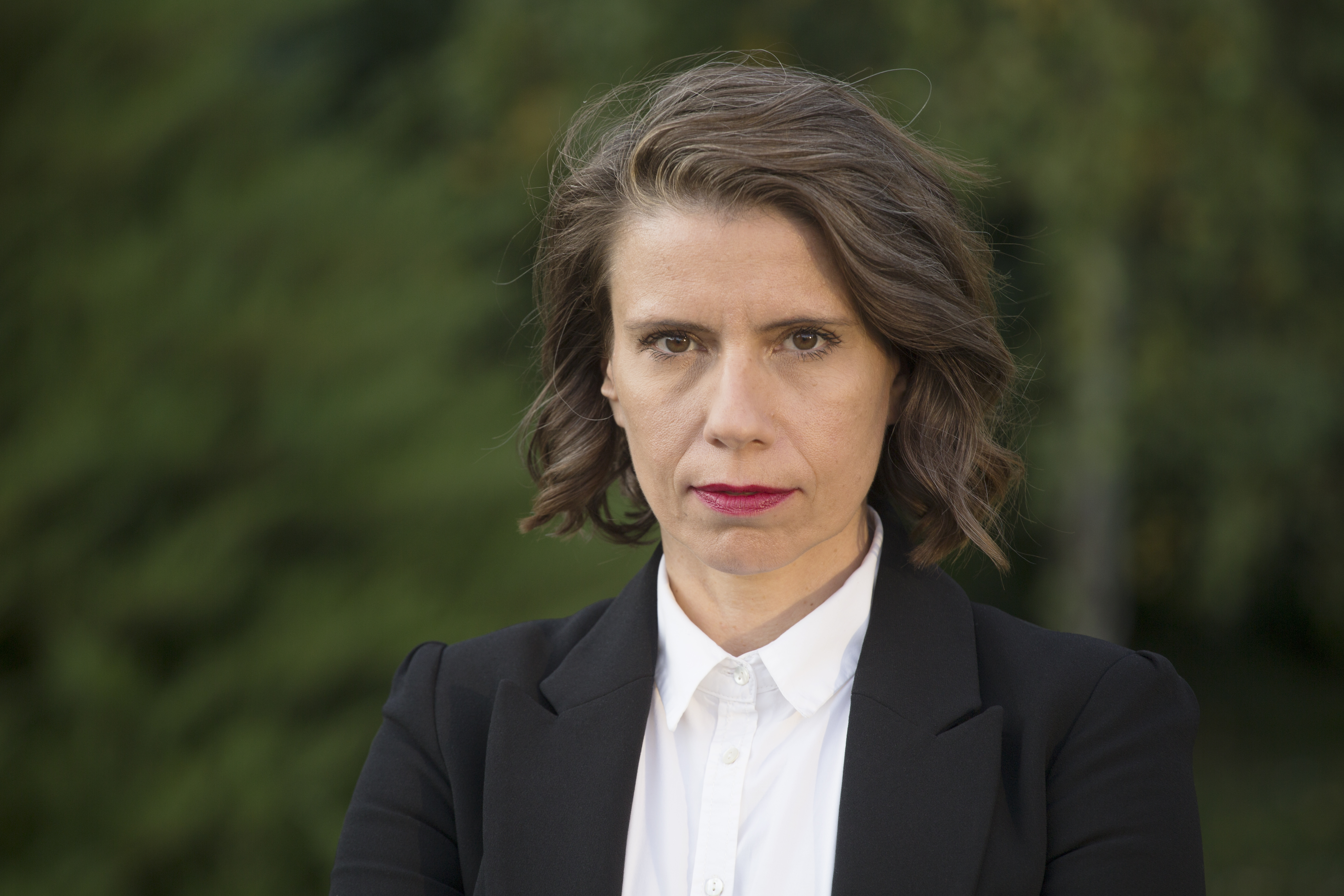

Member of Parliament
- In office July 22, 2020 – May 16, 2024

Member of Zagreb Assembly
- In office March 13, 2018 – September 13, 2018

Personal details
- Born: 16 November 1974 (age 51) Zagreb, SR Croatia, Yugoslavia
- Party: Workers' Front
- Education: University of Zagreb
- Occupation: Politician
- Profession: University professor

Katarina Peović Vuković (born 16 November 1974) is a Croatian politician and media and culture researcher. From March to September 2018, she was a representative of the Workers' Front party in Zagreb Assembly. On January 21, 2019, Katarina Peović announced her candidacy for the Croatian presidential election in 2019 as a candidate of the Workers' Front party, and established media presence in the candidates' confrontations. In the 2020 parliamentary elections, she was elected as a member of the Croatian Parliament on the platform of the Green–Left Coalition.

== Biography ==
Katarina Peović was born in Zagreb on November 16, 1974. She graduated in comparative literature and Croatian language and literature at the Faculty of Humanities and Social Sciences in Zagreb (1993 – 1999). From 2004 to 2005 she worked as an assistant at the Institute for Social Research in Zagreb. Since 2005, she has been working at the Department of Cultural Studies at the University of Rijeka (2005 assistant, 2012. assistant professor,, 2019. associate professor), where she teaches courses in the field and culture theory. She was the editor of the literary and theoretical magazine Libra Libera (1999 – 2017), a member of the editorial board of Zarez (2004 – 2009) and the editor of the radio cultural and media show Elektrosfera Third Program of HR (2008 – 2009). She edited the collection of texts by the American theorist Hakim Bey The Temporary Autonomous Zone and Other Texts (2003). She is the author of a dozen scientific papers and several articles in anthologies.

== Political activity ==
Katarina Peović joined the Workers' Front in March 2017. She entered Zagreb Assembly as a rotating representative of the Workers' Front in January 2018 and held the function until September 2018. Her mandate was preceded by Mate Kapović and followed by Miljenka Ćurković.

On May 7, 2018 the proposal of the Workers' Front (and thus the Left Bloc which it was part of) was successfully voted in Zagreb Assembly that the City of Zagreb should help the workers of companies Kamensko and Dioki by purchasing a part of the workers' claims on unpaid wages in the same amount in which these companies have paid utility fees in bankruptcy. Subsequently, the mayor Milan Bandić, strictly opposed to the proposal to purchase the workers' claims, convened an extraordinary session in order to refute the proposal.

On January 21, 2019 at a conference for the media and the public the Workers' Front announced Katarina Peović as their nominee for the 2019–20 Croatian presidential election. They also presented a program for democratic socialism for the 21st century. In most of the live media confrontations, Peović dominated the duels with other candidates and was considered one of the key factors behind the relatively late loss of votes for the right wing candidate Miroslav Škoro.

Peović was elected to the 10th Sabor following the 2020 Croatian parliamentary election. Announcement of her candidacy for the mayor of Rijeka in the 2021 local elections caused a rift in the Green–Left Coalition and ultimately resulted in the expulsion of the Workers' Front from the coalition. Peović failed to achieve the 5% electoral threshold in the 2024 Croatian parliamentary election, leaving the party without a representative in the Croatian Parliament (Sabor).

== Personal life ==
In the 1990s Katarina Peović was the lead guitarist in the all-female rock and heavy metal band Maxmett, with whom she produced the album and the homonymous hit single Mačke vole grebati, and later played for several other bands such as Rebels Room, Stampedo and Pozdrav Azri ('Salute to Azra'). Peović recalls the great influence her musical environment had on her, particularly when fellow musicians rejected to obey Tuđman regime's bans on music the authorities deemed unsuitable (e.g. songs by Serbian musicians).

== Works ==
- Peović, Katarina (2012). Pintarić, Krešimir (ed.). Mediji i kultura: ideologija medija nakon decentralizacije [Media and Culture: Ideology of Media after Decentralization] (in Croatian). Jesenski i Turk. ISBN 9789532223965.
- Peović, Katarina (2016). Marx u digitalnom dobu : dijalektički materijalizam na vratima tehnologije [Marx in Digital Age: Dialectic Materialism at the Doors of Technology] (in Croatian). Durieux. ISBN 9789531884358.
- Peović, Katarina (2021). Sve što je čvrsto i postojano pretvara se u dim: Historijski materijalizam kao metoda, kritika i analiza [All that is solid and stable turns to smoke: Historical materialism as a method, critique and analysis] (in Croatian). Durieux. ISBN 9789531884860.
