= Danica Baričević =

Croatian politician (born 1972)

Danica Baričević (born 17 July 1972 in Myrtleford, Australia) is a Croatian politician from the Croatian Democratic Union. She represents District X in the Croatian Parliament deputising for Branko Bačić.

== See also ==
- List of members of the Sabor, 2020–2024
