= Croatian Bank for Reconstruction and Development =

Bank for Reconstruction and Development in Croatia

- Hrvatska banka za obnovu i razvitak

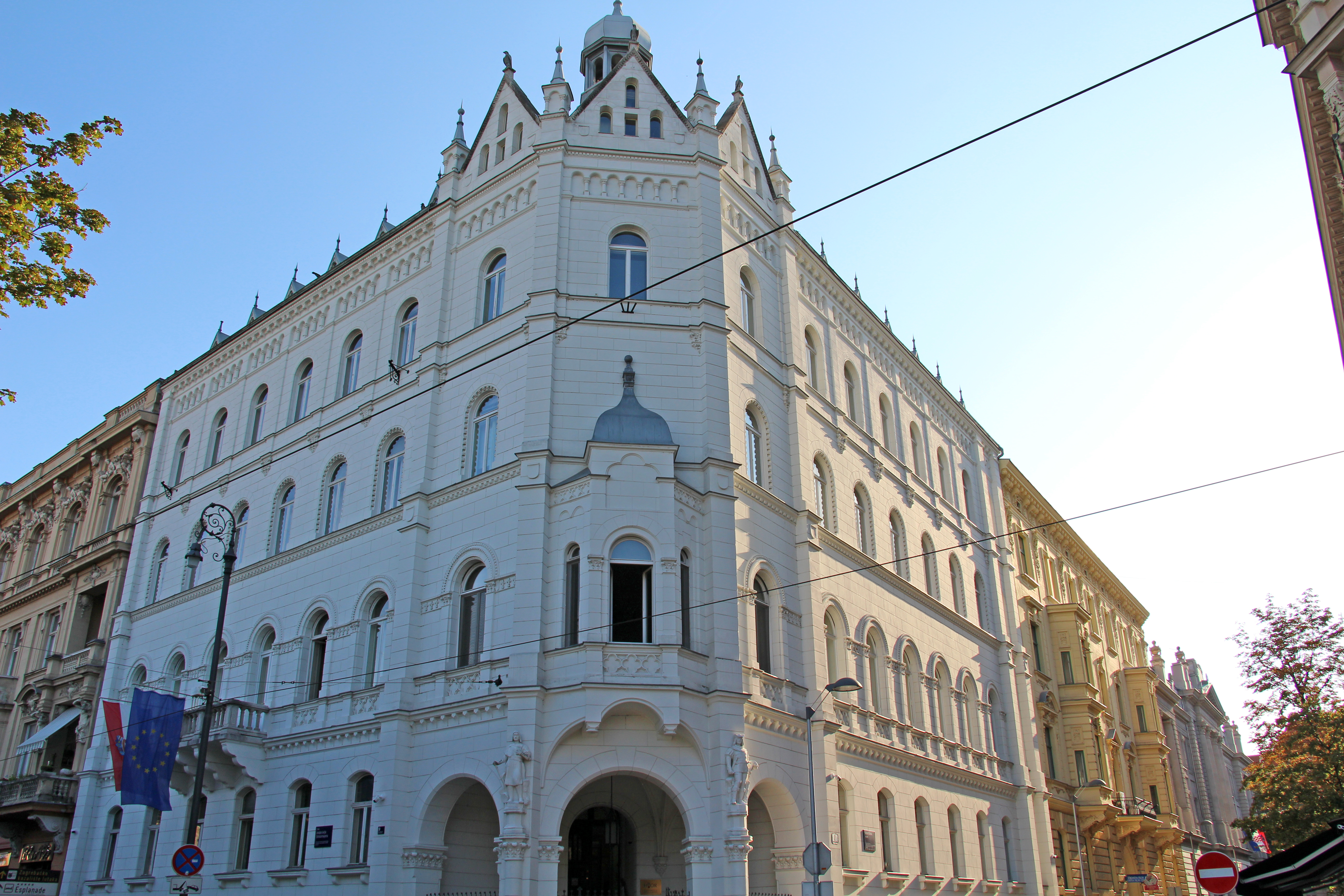
- Abbreviation: HBOR
- Formation: 12 June 1992
- Founder: Government of Croatia
- Founded at: Zagreb, Croatia
- Type: Development bank / export credit agency
- Purpose: Financing reconstruction and development of the Croatian economy; promoting exports and supporting SMEs
- Headquarters: Strossmayerov Square 9, 10000 Zagreb, Croatia
- Region served: Croatia
- Services: Loans, export credit insurance, guarantees, venture capital financing, business advisory
- Owner: Republic of Croatia
- Subsidiaries: Hrvatsko kreditno osiguranje d.d. Poslovni info servis d.o.o.
- Staff: 457 (2025)
- Website: www.hbor.hr

Croatian Bank for Reconstruction and Development (Croatian: Hrvatska banka za obnovu i razvitak, HBOR) is Croatia's national development bank. Its task is the promotion of the development of the Croatian economy by extending loans, insuring export transactions against political and commercial risks, issuing guarantees, and providing business advice.

Main activities of HBOR:

- Financing the reconstruction and development of Croatian economy
- Financing infrastructure
- Promoting exports
- Supporting the development of small and medium-sized enterprises
- Promoting environmental protection
- Insuring the exports of Croatian goods and services from non-marketable risks

== See also ==
- List of national development banks
- List of banks in Croatia
