= Marijan Pavliček =

Croatian politician (born 1980)

Mayor of Vukovar
- Incumbent
- Assumed office 6 June 2025
- Preceded by: Ivan Penava

Personal details
- Born: 4 December 1980 (age 45)
- Party: Croatian Sovereignists

Marijan Pavliček (born 4 December 1980) is a Croatian politician. He has served as mayor of Vukovar since 2025, and as president of the Croatian Sovereignists since 2021. He has been a member of the Croatian Parliament since 2020. From 2014 to 2021, he served as deputy mayor of Vukovar.
