= Mladoševica =

Village in Maglaj, Bosnia and Herzegovina

- Village
- Location within Bosnia and Herzegovina
- Coordinates: 44°31′37″N 18°00′47″E
- Country: Bosnia and Herzegovina
- Entity: Federation of Bosnia and Herzegovina
- Canton: Zenica-Doboj
- Municipality: Maglaj

Area
  - Total: 2.09 sq mi (5.41 km^{2})

Population (2013)
  - Total: 720
  - Density: 340/sq mi (130/km^{2})
- Time zone: UTC+1 (CET)
  - Summer (DST): UTC+2 (CEST)

Mladoševica is a village in the municipality of Maglaj, Bosnia and Herzegovina.

== Demographics ==
According to the 2013 census, its population was 720.

Ethnicity in 2013
Ethnicity	Number	Percentage
Croats	693	96.3%
Bosniaks	25	3.5%
Serbs	1	0.1%
other/undeclared	1	0.1%
Total	720	100%
