= Ruža Tomašić =

Croatian politician (born 1958)

Ruža Tomašić MEP
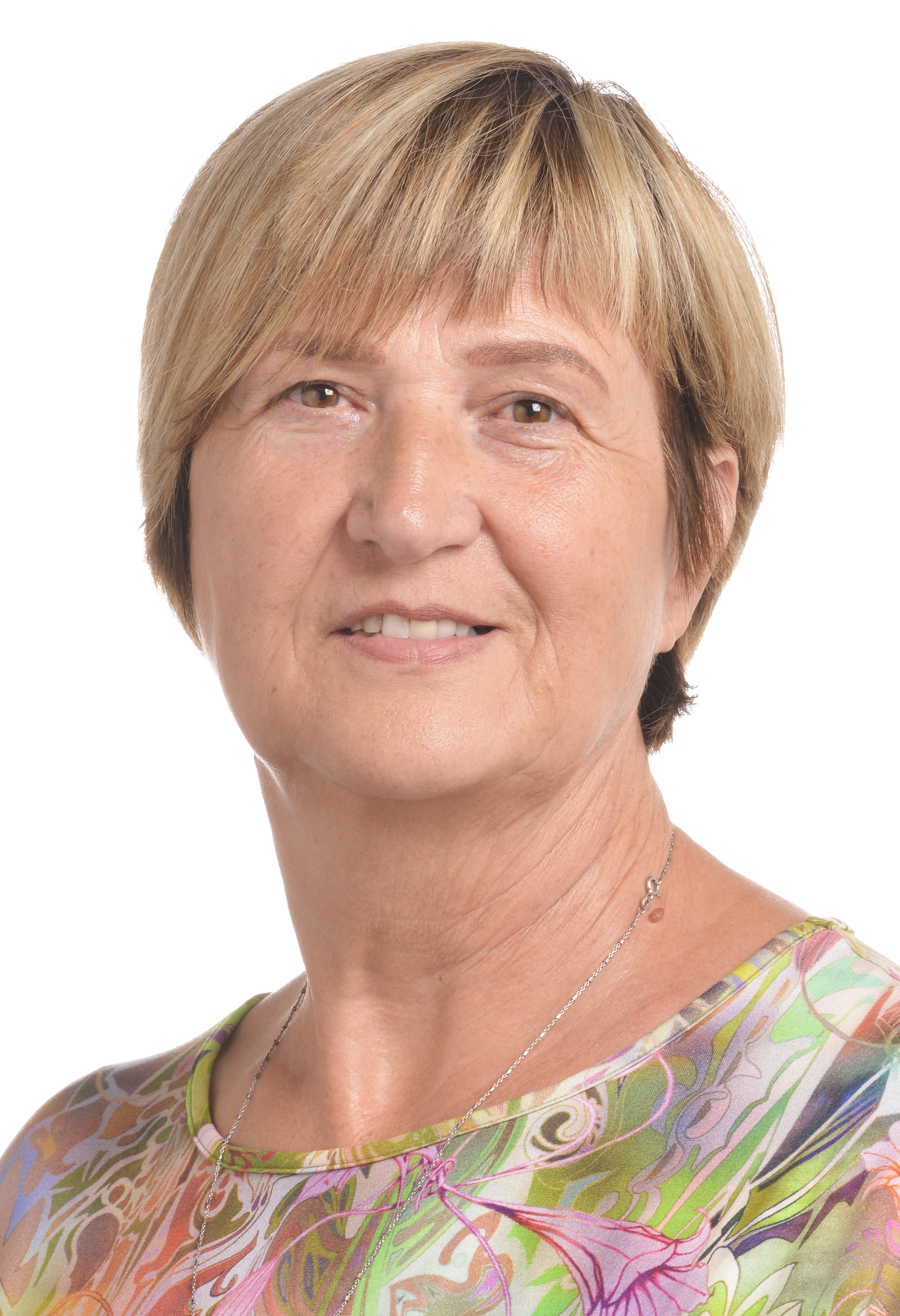

Member of the European Parliament
- In office 1 July 2013 – 26 June 2021
- Constituency: Croatia

Member of the Croatian Parliament for the 10th electoral district
- In office 22 December 2011 – 1 July 2013
- In office 22 December 2003 – 12 October 2007

President of the Croatian Party of Rights Dr. Ante Starčević
- In office 12 September 2009 – 3 November 2014
- Deputy: Pero Ćorić

Personal details
- Born: 10 May 1958 (age 68) Mladoševica, PR Bosnia and Herzegovina, Yugoslavia (modern Bosnia and Herzegovina)
- Party: Croatian Party of Rights (1990–2009); Croatian Party of Rights Dr. Ante Starčević (2009–2014); Croatian Conservative Party (2015–2021)
- Education: Ontario Police College
- Awards: Order of Stjepan Radić

Ruža Tomašić (pronounced [rǔːʒa tɔ̌maʃitɕ]; born 10 May 1958) is a Croatian politician who served as a Member of the European Parliament from July 2013 to June 2021, having been elected to the position three times. Upon her withdrawal from the Parliament, she retired from politics altogether.

After finishing elementary school at the age of 10, Tomašić moved to Canada where she finished high school and a police college. As a police officer, she worked on the prevention of juvenile delinquency and combatting drug trafficking. After Croatian president Franjo Tuđman invited her to return to Croatia in 1990, Tomašić accepted and started working as a member of Tuđman's personal security. After beating ovarian cancer, she decided to leave police work and engage in politics. From 2003 to 2008 she was a member of the Croatian Parliament elected from the list of the Croatian Party of Rights and from December 2011 to July 2013 as an MP for the Croatian Party of Rights Dr. Ante Starčević. At the 2013 and 2014 EP elections, Tomašić won second most preference votes of all the candidates, and at the 2019 EP elections, most preference votes.

On 17 January 2015 she joined the newly founded Croatian Conservative Party. In the European Parliament, Tomašić sits in the European Conservatives and Reformists group.

As of 2019, the European Parliament adopted 5 of her reports, 28 reports on which she worked as a shadow rapporteur, 573 of her amendments and 293 resolutions which, in addition to delivering more than 1000 speeches and sending 146 parliamentary questions to the EU Commission and the Council, made her the most active Croatian MEP.

== Early life ==
Ruža Tomašić was born in the village of Mladoševica, PR Bosnia and Herzegovina, and grew up with her parents, six sisters and a brother in the Slavonian village of Velika Kopanica. At age 15, she left Croatia and joined her older sister in Canada, who was married and lived in Toronto, Ontario. Tomašić worked on a variety of jobs to support herself before enrolling in 13-week program at Ontario Police College, from which she graduated in 1981. She then became a constable for the Ontario Provincial Police from 1984 to 1987, during which she became the first female constable to complete the motorcycle training course. In 1987, she relocated to Vancouver, British Columbia after her marriage, where she continued to work as a constable. In her career as a police officer, she primarily dealt with juvenile delinquency and illegal drug trade, which included undercover work.

== Return to Croatia ==
In September 1990, Tomašić moved to Croatia, by invitation from then-President Franjo Tuđman who met her during his state visit to Canada, and served as a bodyguard for top Croatian government officials. In 1992, she was diagnosed with uterine cancer, and chose to go back to Canada for medical treatment. After recovering completely from her illness in 1998 she decided to move to Croatia again. In the meantime, Tomašić appeared in approximately 20 episodes of The X-Files and Millennium as a stuntwoman, drawing on her experience of riding a police motorcycle in the mid-1980s.

== Politics and activism ==
Tomašić was politically active in the Croatian Canadian community, and became a member of the nationalist Croatian Party of Rights in 1990. After settling in Croatia with her family in 1998, she began a more earnest involvement in politics, became a vice-president of the Croatian Party of Rights, and entered the 2003 election in the top spot on her party's list in the 10th electoral unit, which brought her a seat in Sabor. Her term ended in January 2008.

In 2009 Tomašić left the Croatian Party of Rights over disagreements with its president Anto Đapić. She accused Đapić of "betraying the party" and of using his position for personal gain. In September 2009 she was elected president of a new party, Croatian Party of Rights Dr. Ante Starčević.

Known as an anti-drug activist, she reportedly received a number of death threats in 2006. In 2007 it was reported that organized crime groups had been allegedly planning her assassination. By that time, she had started carrying a pistol for self-defense, and her family received police protection. In December 2010 Tomašić received the Order of Stjepan Radić in recognition of her efforts fighting organized crime.

In March 2013, she made headlines after she was quoted saying "Croatia is for Croats while everyone else is a guest", a claim she disputed. On 3 November 2014 Tomašić left the Croatian Party of Rights Dr. Ante Starčević.

=== Member of European Parliament ===
In the European election of 14 April 2013, Tomašić was elected in the European Parliament, placing 6th in the candidates list of the Croatian Democratic Union (HDZ). On 1 July 2013, after Croatia joined the European Union, she took office as Member of the European Parliament (MEP).

Tomašić joined European Conservatives and Reformists Group and became member of the Committee on Employment and Social Affairs and Special Committee on Organised Crime, Corruption and Money Laundering. She was re-elected MEP following European election of 25 May 2014, serving her second term in office, placing 5th in the candidates list of HDZ.

== Controversies ==
Commenting on the statement by Serbian Labour Minister Aleksandar Vulin, who said Croatia cannot give lessons to Serbia about war crimes after Croatia's Interior Minister Ranko Ostojić said that Serbia could improve its path to join the European Union by holding a trial for the murder of twelve Croatian police officers in Borovo Selo during the Croatian War of Independence, Tomašić stated: "Let them [Serbs] pray to God that we do not clean up our yard because if we start to clean our yard you will have a lot more Serbs from Croatia who will have to go to Serbia. They hold this state for their treasury and supermarket and give nothing to the state". Her statement was criticised by many, including the Committee on Human Rights and National Minorities of the Croatian Parliament. Three days later, Tomašić wrote on her official Facebook page that she was referring to those Serbs who committed war crimes during the 1990s Croatian War of Independence and were never tried.

== Personal life ==
Tomašić lives in Brna, on the island of Korčula, which is the birthplace of her husband Vlado, whom she married in 1987. They have two children.

She is a practising Roman Catholic and declares her adherence to traditional Christian values.
