= Marriage in Sudan =

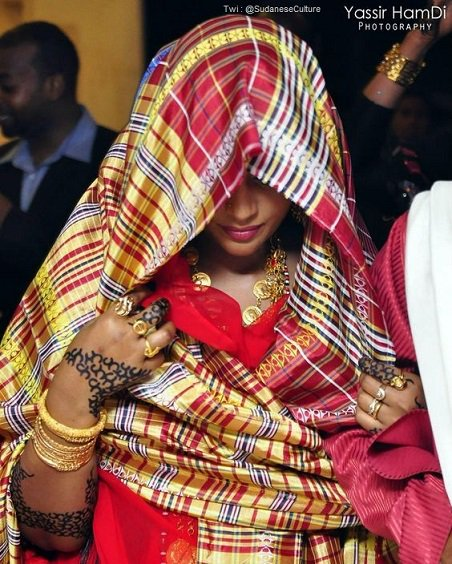
Sudanese bride in traditional costume (qarmis)

Marriage in Sudan is a fundamental social institution governed by Islamic law and Sudanese culture. Three types of marriages are recognized: traditional, civil, and religious. Arranged marriages are common, with parents typically arranging unions. Child marriage is an issue, with some exceptions to the legal age.

Sudanese wedding traditions include the "Qulat al-Khair" where the bride's family is approached, dowry customs, the "Shai El Henna" ceremony, and the Henna night. The contract, the feast of the contract, and the wedding day are central events in the marriage process. Sudanese weddings are marked by customs like the "zaffa," a wedding procession, and traditional food. Traditional attire is significant, with brides wearing "thoobs" and grooms wearing "jalabiyas." Various rituals and customs are observed, such as the Jirtig ritual and the cutting of a silk belt.

Post-wedding rituals include the Zaffa procession and the Waleema reception. Some Sudanese tribes incorporate unique customs, such as whipping during weddings or not allowing the wife to cook or sweep for a specified period.

== Statue ==
=== Law ===
Marriage is considered a fundamental social institution in Sudan, and it is highly valued in Sudanese culture. The majority of Sudanese people are Muslims, and Islamic law governs marriage and family matters. Under Islamic law, marriage is a contract between two parties, based on mutual consent between the groom and the bride's guardian (wali). The marriage contract is regulated by the Personal Status Law of 1991. The law sets the legal age of marriage to 18 for boys and 16 for girls, and supports polygyny.

Three types of marriages are recognized by law. Traditional marriage, also known as Zawaj al-Urfi or customary marriage, is recognised by the community and is not registered with the government. The second type is civil marriage, which is registered with the government and recognized by the law. The third type is religious marriage, which is performed in accordance with Islamic law and is recognized by the government.

The marriage contract in Sudan is regulated by the Personal Status Law of 1991, which has been met with a number of objections from feminist groups and human rights advocates.

=== Arranged and forced marriage ===
In Sudan, arranged marriages are very common, especially in rural areas. In most cases, the parents of the bride and groom arrange the marriage. The bride's family usually requires a dowry, which is a payment made by the groom or his family to the bride's family. The amount of the dowry can vary depending on the region and the economic status of the families involved.

Child marriage is a significant issue in Sudan, particularly in rural areas. According to UNICEF, 12% of girls in Sudan are married before the age of 15, and 34% are married before the age of 18. The legal age of marriage in Sudan is 18 for boys and 16 for girls. However, there are exceptions to this law, such as the Islamic law, which allows girls as young as nine to get married.

=== Domestic violence ===
Domestic violence is also a significant issue in Sudan, particularly against women. Deteriorating economic conditions since 2020 and the COVID-19 pandemic have fueled an increase in domestic violence and forced marriage in Sudan, as per a UN-backed study.

== Marriage rituals ==
Sudanese wedding traditions and rituals are diverse and vary by region and ethnic group. The marriage process in Sudan begins with the selection of the bride and groom. In most cases, the families of the bride and groom initiate the selection process, and the couple has limited say in the matter.

=== Qulat al-Khair ===
The groom's family will send a representative to the bride's family to express their interest in the marriage. It is a session in which the elders of the family of both parties meet with the intention of getting to know each other and ascertaining the origin and heritage of each family, and in which the uncles of the groom or his father usually ask for the daughter to marry their son. If the bride's family agrees, the couple will be allowed to meet to get to know each other better. However, if the bride's family does not agree, the process will end.

=== Dowry ===
It is also known as the dowry or bride price. Upon reaching this stage, the actual preparations for marriage begin, and the money dam consists of Sudanese clothes, perfumes and shoes (sheila), in addition to money, and these preparations vary according to the groom’s financial ability, and in some cases it is according to the bride’s request.

The next pre-wedding ritual is known as the Shai El Henna, which takes place a week before the wedding day. During this ceremony, the bride's family and friends visit the groom's home, and the groom's mother presents the bride with gifts, such as traditional Sudanese clothing and jewellery. In return, the bride's family will present the groom with a traditional Sudanese sword or other gifts.

=== Shayla ===
On the day of the wedding, the groom and his male relatives and friends gather at the bride's family home to ask for her hand in marriage. This event is known as the "shayla," and it involves negotiations between the two families. Once the bride's family has agreed to the marriage, the groom is allowed to enter the bride's home, and the couple is officially engaged. Shila is the first ritual/celebration. This is the night where female relatives from both the bride and groom's side gather together and bring gifts for the bride. Presents contain gifts bought from the groom for the future wife – she gets a big suitcase full of dresses, shoes, cosmetics, and other accessories.

Each bride-to-be in Sudan gets a custom-made perfume made by close female relatives. It is unique in scent, like a signature, and wearing perfume on general is reserved for married ladies only. In social cue, it means a woman is married; therefore, unmarried women by wearing perfume signal their single status. Other traditions include the Shila celebration, where female relatives from both sides gather to bring gifts for the bride, and the custom-made perfume made by close female relatives for the bride-to-be.

=== Henna night ===
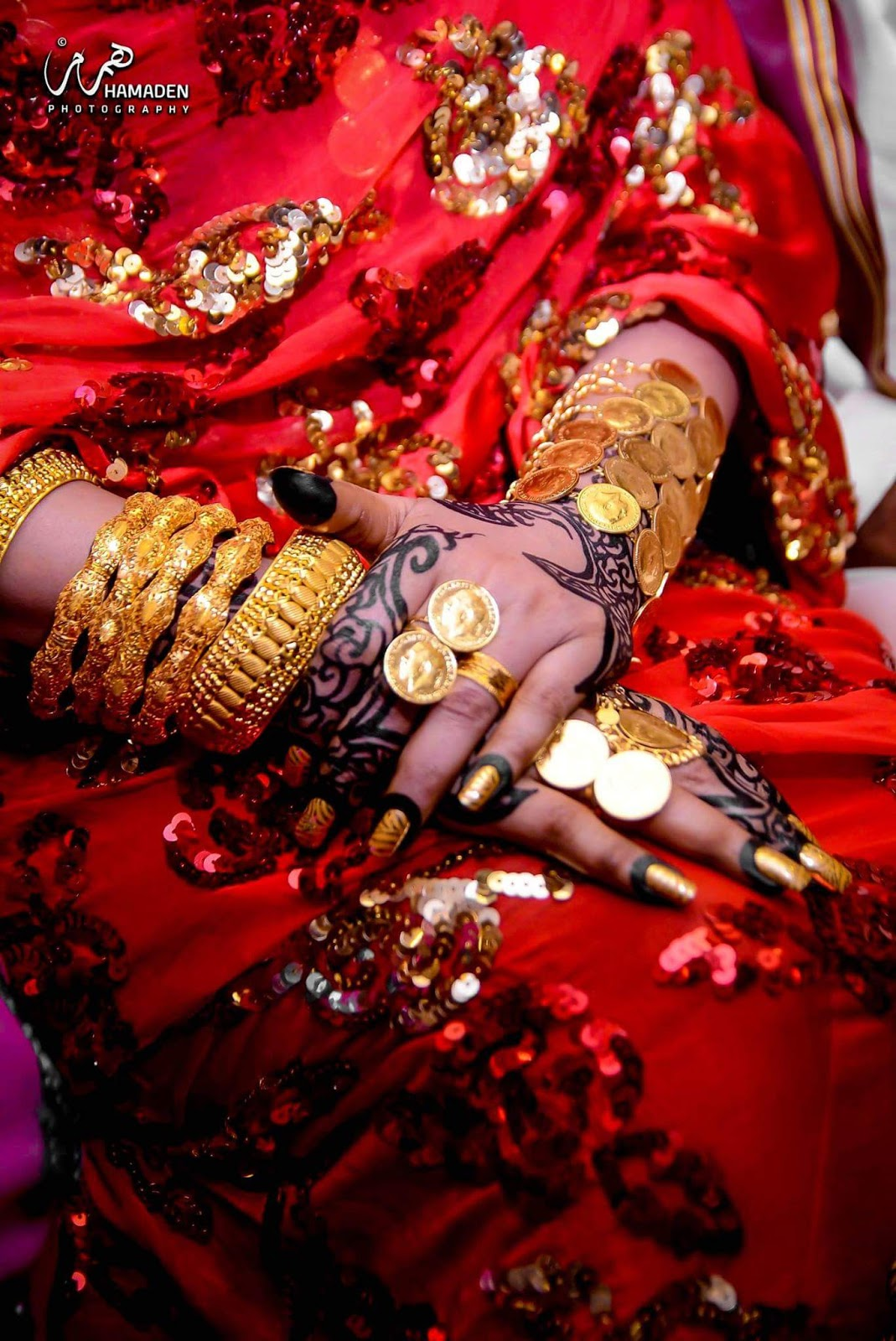
Henna art

Once the couple is engaged, the pre-wedding rituals will begin. The first ritual is known as the Henna night, which is held one or two days before the wedding day. It’s one of the most important traditions in Sudanese weddings is the henna night, which takes place a few days before the wedding day. During this event, the bride and her female relatives and friends gather to apply henna on their hands and feet. The henna designs are intricate and beautiful and are meant to symbolize good luck and fertility. Recently, this stage has increased, as it was not so widespread in the past, because marriage previously did not go far beyond the scope of the family or the neighbours.

During this night, the bride's hands and feet are decorated with henna, and her close female family members and friends sing and dance while the bride sits in the center. In some communities, the groom's hands are also decorated with henna. In it, each of the bride and groom 's family is invited separately, and the legs and hands of both the groom and the bride are dyed with henna, and food is served, and singing and social sessions are held.

=== Dukhan ===
The bride-to-be typically moves away from home and lives with relatives for one to three months before the wedding day, during which time she prepares for the wedding. One of the major preparations, basically a part of the beauty regime prior to the wedding day, is the unique ritual called Dukhan, a kind of sauna where the bride-to-be is bathed in scented smoke. Where the bride and groom sit on a red-covered wooden bed surrounded by guests, and the beauty rituals that the bride undergoes before the wedding, including a scented smoke bath.

=== Wedding ===
It is the marriage contract that takes place at the hands of the authorized person in the presence of both the bride’s guardian and the groom’s agent. The Holy Qur’an is recited and the attendees are reminded of the benefit of marriage to society. After that, it follows with an offer from the bride’s guardian to the groom’s agent, and the groom’s agent responds with acceptance according to the dowry or dowry agreed upon. Among them, which is legally recognized by the Civil Status Law of 1991, which is based on the weighted Hanafi school of thought.

It is a feast that usually consists of lunch, and the family, relatives, and friends are invited to bless this marriage, and it often takes place in a “graveyard” or a tent adjacent to the house.

=== Wedding party ===
The wedding ceremony itself is typically held in a large hall or a mosque and is attended by the couple's family and friends. The bride and groom are seated on a stage, and a "sheikh" or religious leader conducts the ceremony. The couple is required to exchange vows, and the groom presents the bride with a "mahr," or a gift of money or jewellery. After the ceremony, the couple is showered with gifts and congratulations from their guests. in which people are invited, singers and musicians are brought, and dinner is served. This party is usually in the evening and extends until eleven in the evening as a maximum.

The wedding day is the most important day in Sudanese marriage rituals. The day starts with the groom's family visiting the bride's home to escort her to the wedding venue. In some communities, the groom will ride a horse or a camel to the bride's home. Once the bride arrives at the wedding venue, the couple will exchange vows and rings, and the bride's family will present the groom with a dowry. The dowry, known as Mahr, is a gift from the groom to the bride and can include money, jewellery, or property. Another unusual tradition is the Ja'alin tribe's customary practice of whipping during weddings.

Sudanese weddings are marked by several customs and rituals. One of the key customs is the “zaffa,” a traditional wedding procession involving music, dancing, and colorful costumes. The groom and his family lead the procession, often accompanied by a horse, while the bride is escorted by her family.

=== Food ===
Food is also an essential part of Sudanese weddings, and the menu typically consists of traditional dishes such as "kisra," a type of bread made from sorghum flour, and "ful medames," a stew made from fava beans. Desserts such as "asida," a sweet porridge made from cornmeal, and "hassawa," a type of sweet cake, are also served.

=== Jirtig ===
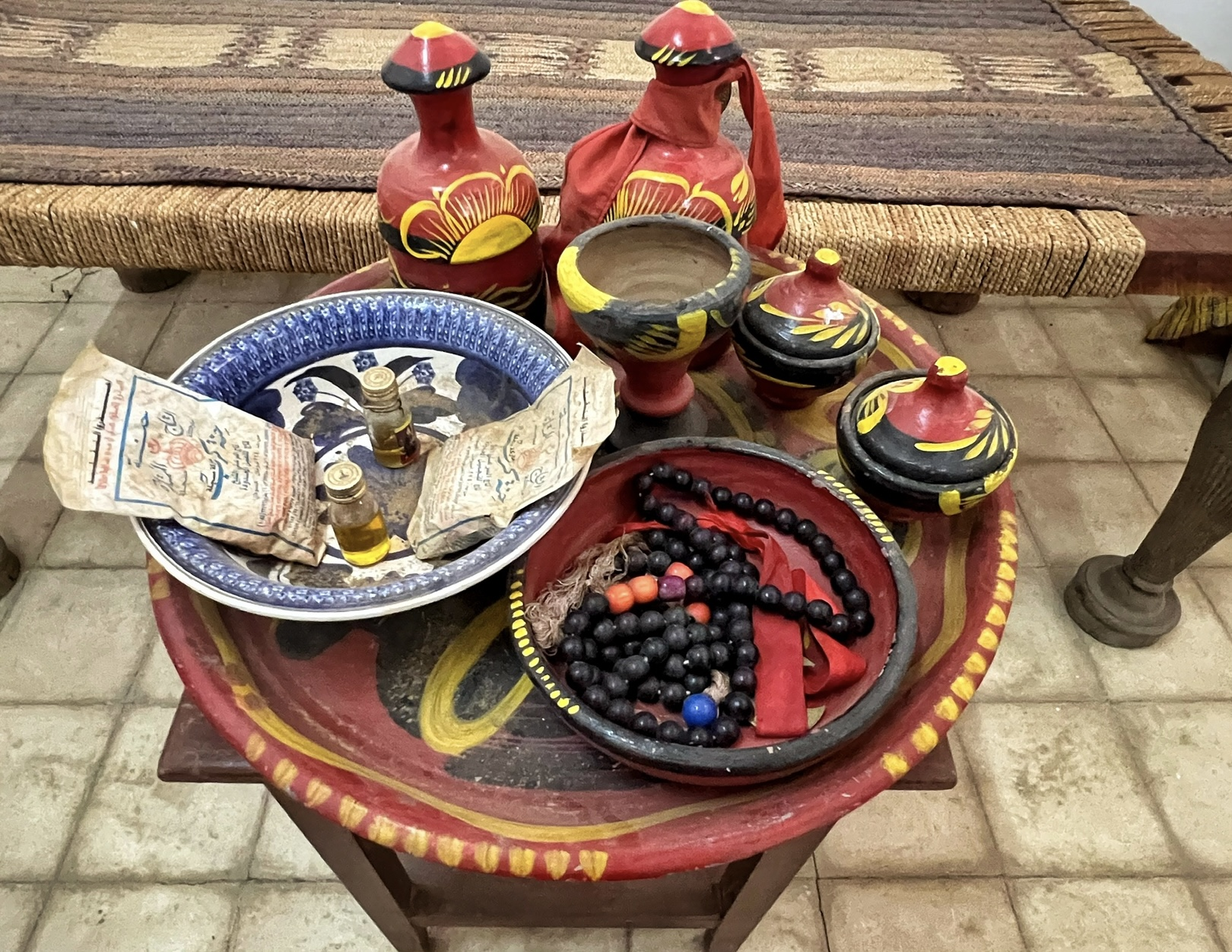
Sudanese wedding Jirtig paraphernalia, Sudan Ethnographic Museum 2022

Another tradition is the Jirtig ritual, which is associated mostly with wedding ceremonies. During the Jirtig ritual, both the bride and groom sit on a brim-embroidered, red-covered wooden bed, surrounded by their families and guests. In addition to these traditional rituals, Sudanese weddings are also characterized by their elaborate and colourful attire. The bride wears a "thawb" or a long, flowing dress that is often made of silk or satin and is adorned with intricate embroidery and beading. The groom wears a "jalabiya" or a long, loose-fitting robe that is typically made of cotton or linen.

It is a very old custom, and it is said that it dates back to Pharaonic origins, and both the groom and the bride are dressed in red clothes.

=== Cutting the rat ===
The bride comes with a silk belt in her midst, and the groom cuts it and throws it to the audience. Young brides in Northern Sudan have been performing the Bride Dance on, or near, their wedding nights for thousands of years. Today, plenty of Sudanese women reject it, saying they don't want to.

=== Writing cards ===
Where the groom's friends prepare a small ceremony for writing cards after setting the date of marriage in order to invite acquaintances to complete the marriage ceremony. After the wedding ceremony, the newlywed couple will go to the groom's home, where a reception will be held. The reception is usually a big celebration with food, drinks, music, and dance. In some communities, the bride will change into a different outfit, such as a red Sudanese dress or a white wedding gown.

The post-wedding rituals in Sudan are also significant. The first ritual is known as the Zaffa, which is held the day after the wedding. The Zaffa is a procession that takes place in the streets, where the groom's family and friends will dance and sing while carrying the bride on a decorated platform. The procession is usually accompanied by a live band. Another post-wedding ritual is known as the Waleema, which is a reception held by the groom's family a few days after the wedding. The Waleema is usually a more intimate event, where the groom's family will invite close friends and family members to celebrate the marriage.

=== Variations ===
Additionally, some Sudanese tribes practice the custom of whipping as part of the wedding ceremony, while the Dinka tribe has a tradition where the wife does not cook or sweep for four years after marriage.
