= Rada Borić =

Croatian feminist

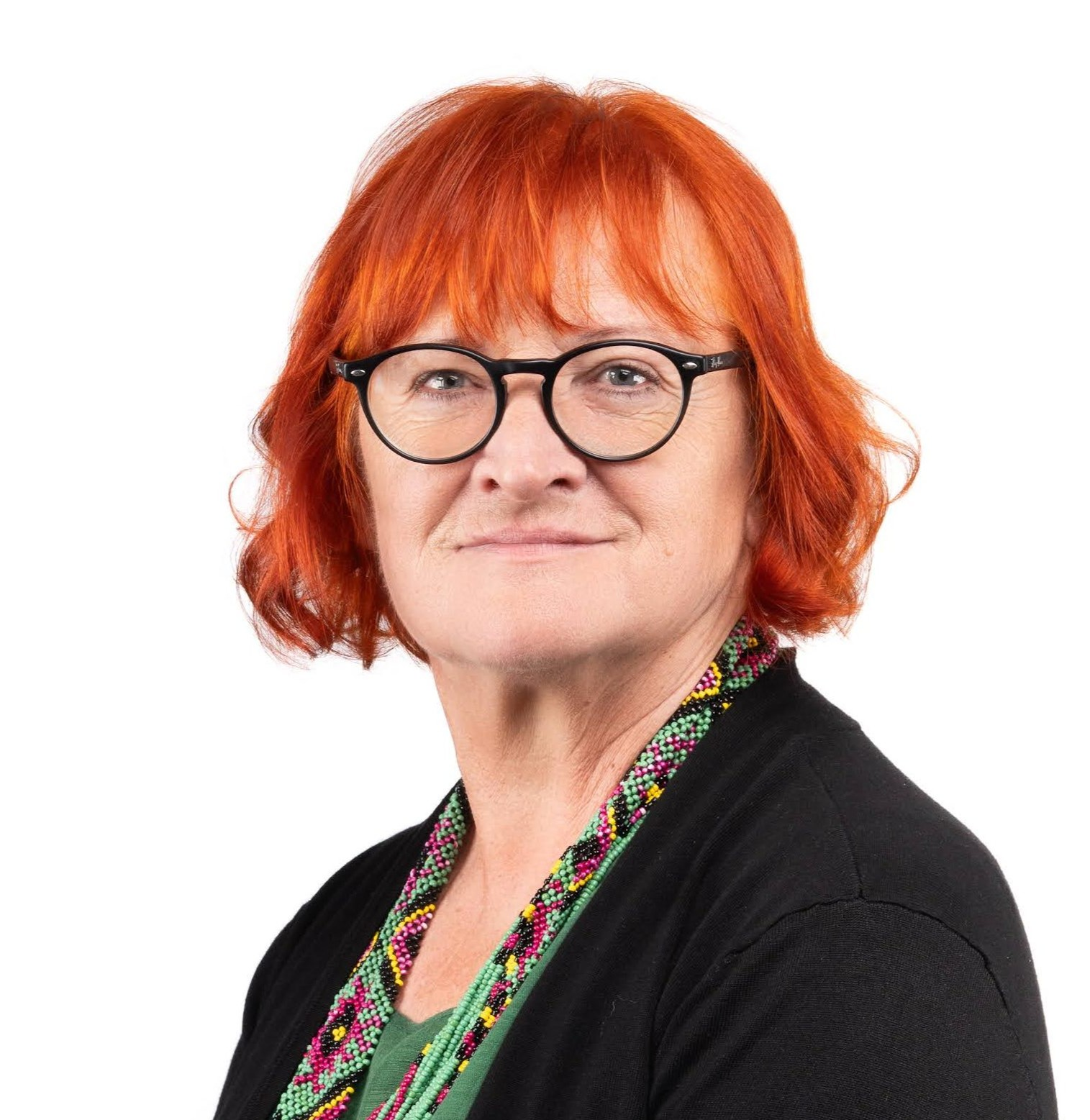

Member of the Croatian Parliament for 6th electoral district
- Incumbent
- Assumed office 16 May 2024
- Preceded by: Tomislav Tomašević

Member of the Croatian Parliament for 7th electoral district
- In office 22 July 2020 – 16 May 2024 Serving with: Ivana Kekin (substituted from 15 September 2021)

Personal details
- Born: 11 September 1951 (age 74) Zagreb, SR Croatia, Yugoslavia
- Party: New Left (2016–present); We Can! (2023–present)
- Education: University of Zagreb

Rada Borić (born 1951) is a Croatian politician, scholar, feminist, and women's rights activist. She has served as member of the Croatian Parliament from 2020 to 2021 and since 2024. She is one of the founders and the current vice-president of the New Left political party, and a member of the green-left We Can! party.

While working in Finland, she edited the first Finnish-Croatian / Croatian-Finnish dictionary, ensuring that all nouns included both the feminine and masculine forms. She was among the founders of the Centar za ženske studije (Center for Women's Studies) in 1995, the first gender studies program in Croatia. She has been recognized for her work on programs that protect and promote women by the Order of the White Rose of Finland and the Order of the Croatian Interlace.

== Early life and education ==
Rada Borić was born in 1951 in Zagreb, PR Croatia, Yugoslavia, to mother Danica and father Isidor Borić. She was raised in Koprivnica, where she completed her primary and secondary education, with her younger sister Nada Beroš, who would later become a museum curator. She graduated from the Faculty of Philosophy in Zagreb, with a PhD in Croatian language and literature.

== Career ==
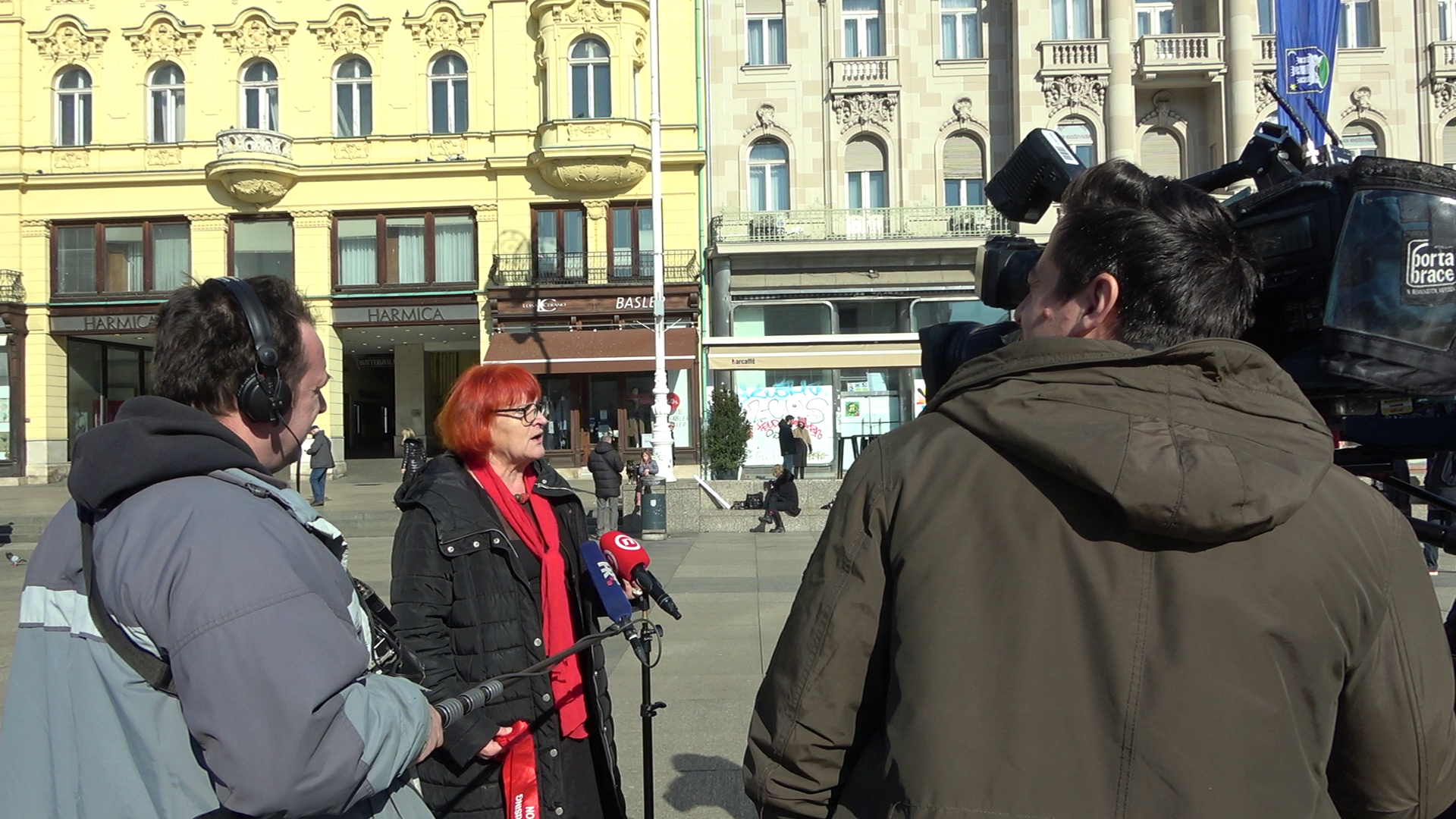
Media interview at the 2022 One Billion Rising event in Zagreb

In 1978, Borić began working at the University of Helsinki as a lecturer in Croatian. Because she could not speak Finnish, she initially lectured in English. She taught courses on Balkan cultural history and worked as a proofreader for Croatian texts. Living in both Helsinki and Zagreb, she commuted between the two cities for work and her husband, Želimir Borić, a painter who identifies as a feminist, followed her as her work demanded. Her first Finnish contract expired in 1982 and Borić returned to Zagreb, teaching Croatian to foreign students at the University of Zagreb, until she was awarded a scholarship to study abroad. She continued her education at Indiana University as a Fulbright Scholar and while there, encountered the women's movement. She enrolled in Women's studies courses and began studying women's history, becoming an activist for feminist issues and human rights.

Borić completed her U.S. studies in 1985 and then returned to Zagreb for a year. Between 1986 and 1991, she returned to lecturing at the University of Helsinki. She returned to Zagreb in 1991 and as the Bosnian War had already begun, she began working at the Centre ROSA in 1993. In 1994, Borić received a letter of support from writer Eve Ensler, for the work she was doing at the Center to support women refugees. Ensler subsequently made a trip to Croatia and worked with Borić to establish self-help groups in refugee camps. In 1995, Borić and eleven other women founded the Centar za ženske studije (Center for Women's Studies), as an experimental program to promote women's history studies. Classes where first hosted at the Ethnographic Museum, Zagreb and later run as a pilot program for the University of Zagreb, for which Borić taught courses on feminism and linguistics. By design, the courses were kept separate from the mainstream university curricula to maintain the autonomy of the Center and freedom to provide a safe place for discussion of sexuality and gender, while introducing feminist theory to the university. It was the first center devoted to women's studies in Croatia, and Borić served as its executive director.

In 1997, Borić and Ensler joined others involved in the movement to end violence against women to launch V-Day, through raising awareness globally. The movement was kicked off in 1998 with a production, aimed to raise funds to support community anti-violence groups and programs, of The Vagina Monologues at the Hammerstein Ballroom in New York City. Borić became the coordinator for V-Day events in the countries of the former Yugoslavia and the Eastern Bloc, one of 12 international women working to coordinate global events. In 2001, Ensler dedicated her book Necessary Targets: A Story of Women and War, based upon stories she had gathered in the camps, to Borić. The book was subsequently released as a play, for which Borić served as a consultant and executive producer.

In 2001, Borić began working on the first Finnish-Croatian / Croatian-Finnish dictionary. She made sure that all of the nouns in the book included both feminine and masculine forms, rather than the typical male-default words used in traditional dictionaries. In 2007, she was honored as a Knight of the Order of the White Rose of Finland, when the dictionary was published in recognition of her work to foster the relationship between the two countries. In 2013, she was awarded the Order of the Croatian Interlace for her work in the promotion and protection of women's rights in Croatia. Borić was elected to serve in the Zagreb Assembly in 2017.
