= Fahima Hashim =

Sudanese human rights activist

Fahima Hashim (Arabic: فهيمة هاشم)
- Education: Bayero University Kano
- Alma mater: Ahfad University for Women Bayero University Kano
- Occupation: Human rights activist

Fahima Hashim (Arabic: فهيمة هاشم) is a Sudanese human rights activist focusing on women's issues. The co-founder of the Salmmah Women's Resource Centre, she served as its director from 2005 until its dissolution by the Sudanese government in 2014, and currently continues her activism from Canada, where she sought refuge in 2014.

== Personal life ==
Hashim studied psychology at Ahfad University for Women in Omdurman, Sudan. She went on to obtain a master's degree in documentation and library studies at Bayero University Kano in Nigeria, graduating in 1994.

In 2014, Hashim fled Sudan with her daughter and sought asylum in Canada, subsequently settling in Ottawa. In 2022, she returned to Sudan, but left the following year following the outbreak of a civil war between the Sudanese Armed Forces and the Rapid Support Forces; as of 2023, she lives in Canada.

== Activism ==
=== Salmmah Women's Resource Centre (1997–2014) ===
Hashim was one of the co-founders of the Salmmah Women's Resource Centre (Arabic: مركز سالمة لدراسات المرأة, romanized: Markaz Sālimah li-Dirāsāt al-Marʼah), based in Khartoum. The organisation offered outreach work to women and young people on feminist issues and topics, with the aim to empower particularly women to overcome structural, political and legal barriers within Sudan to participate in civil society. In addition, Salmmah also contributed to documenting and researching women's rights and issues facing women in contemporary Sudan with international organisations and charities. While Salmmah was based in Khartoum, it carried out work in all of Sudan's states, including those within South Sudan prior to its independence in 2011. Hashim served as Salmmah's director from 2005 until 2014.

Following the signing of the Comprehensive Peace Agreement in 2005 between the Sudan People's Liberation Movement and the Sudanese government, Hashim felt more able to publicly advocate for and achieve changes to Sudanese laws that directly impacted women. In 2009, Salmmah began advocating for the reform of the 1991 Criminal Law, which equated rape to adultery by treating it as extramarital sex, resulting in rapists getting more lenient punishments. In addition, Hashim also publicly campaigned against the 1991 Public Order Law, which prevented women from wearing trousers or dressing "immodestly"; for a reform of Sudan's penal code, which legalised "cruel" forms of punishments for women, such as stoning; and for an increase in the legal age for marriage to enable girls to focus on their education. While some of these laws were subsequently repealed or amended, Hashim subsequently criticised Sudanese authorities for not wholly implementing the new laws or guidelines on issues such as women's dress and child marriage.

Hashim played a lead organising role in marches and demonstrations promoting women's rights, including leading Khartoum's annual International Women's Day celebrations, as well as events for One Billion Rising and the 16 Days of Action Against Gender Violence. Following the passing of the 2005 Organisation of Humanitarian and Voluntary Work Act, which severely restricted human rights organisations in Sudan, Hashim was able to get financial support from international agencies to help with the costs of running Salmmah, including a $120, 000 grant from the Ford Foundation in 2008.

Hashim faced hostility from Sudanese authorities, and was interrogated several times during her tenure at Salmmah, which was believed to be due to her public criticism and reporting on crimes committed by soldiers during the War in Darfur, including the use of rape as a weapon of war. In March 2014, authorities banned Hashim and Salmmah from holding their annual International Women's Day March in Khartoum.

On 24 June 2014, state authorities attend Salmmah's centre in Khartoum and asked for its employees to cease all work. A decree from the Ministry of Justice announced that Salmmah's registration as a non-profit company had been revoked, prompting its immediate dissolution. The decree did not provide a reason for the decision, though Hashim believed the decision stemmed from the National Intelligence and Security Service, and it has been hypothesised that the decision was made after Hashim gave a speech about the situation for women in Sudan at the Global Summit to End Sexual Violence and Conflict in London, United Kingdom. The decision to close Salmmah was criticised by Women Living Under Muslim Laws as a "violation of the right of civil society to exercise their constitutional right to freedom of expression" as enshrined in the Constitution of Sudan. The Confederation of Sudanese Civil Society Organisations described the closure of Salmmah as an "attack on civil society".

=== Subsequent activism (2014–present) ===
Following Salmmah's closure, a new organisation, SWRC, was established to carry on Salmmah's legacy through supporting young people to contribute to social justice movements in Sudan. Shortly after Salmmah's closure, the President of Sudan, Omar al-Bashir, accused Hashim of "destroying the fabric of Sudanese society", and she subsequently fled the country with her daughter, seeking refuge in Canada. In 2015, Hashim became a visiting scholar at the Feminist Research Centre at York University in Toronto.

After the fall of al-Bashir in 2019, Hashim publicly spoke about wishing to return to Sudan, which she did in 2022, though she was forced to flee the country and return to Canada the following year following the outbreak of the War in Sudan. From Canada, Hashim supported activists to leave Sudan, through supporting with visa applications, and fundraising money to cover transports, rent, and food costs.
