= Dragan Markovina =

Bosnian-Croatian historian and politician

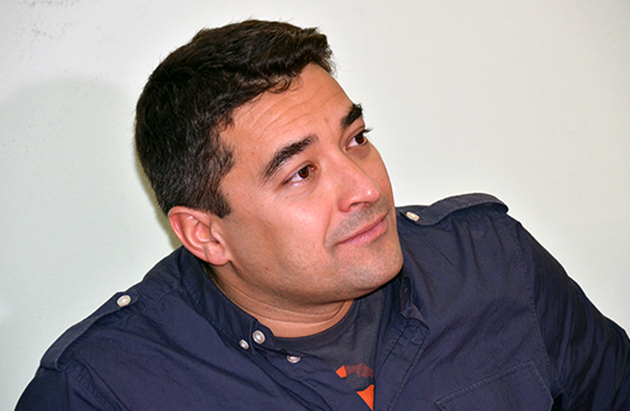
- Markovina in 2016
- Born: 6 February 1981 (age 45); Mostar, SR Bosnia and Herzegovina, SFR Yugoslavia
- Education: MSc, Dr.Sc. (Zagreb)
- Alma mater: University of Zagreb
- Occupations: Historian, writer, politician
- Political party: New Left
- Spouse: Lana Barić (m. 2016, sep. 2017)

Dragan Markovina (born 6 February 1981) is a Bosnian-Croatian historian, author and former president of the New Left of Croatia party.

== Early years and education ==
Markovina was born in Mostar and there he attended the first 5 grades of primary school. In 1992, due to the Bosnian War, he moved to the island of Korčula in Croatia where he continued primary school. He continued to live there after the war. In 1999, Markovina graduated from the gymnasium in Korčula. After that he went to study history at the University Centre for Croatian Studies in Zagreb. He graduated from the faculty in 2004. His graduation thesis was: ZAVNOH- Foundations and political activity.

In December 2004, he started working at the University of Split and later he enrolled in the postgraduate studies of Croatian history at the Faculty of Humanities and Social Sciences in Zagreb. He defended his master's thesis in 2009 on the subject: The Šibenik port in the commercial-cultural exchanges between the two Adriatic coasts in the 18th and 19th century. In 2011, Markovina defended his doctor's thesis on the subject: Dalmatia in the Republic of Venice reform projects during the 18th century.

== Political activism ==
When it comes to politics, he is regarded as a left-wing intellectual. He gained public attention in April 2013 when he started a petition for the removal of Franjo Tuđman's statue in Split. He later announced his candidacy for the council assembly at the 2013 Split local elections. He received 1.97% of the popular vote.

In December 2014, he was a guest on the national TV talk show, Nedjeljom u 2, which is the most popular TV talk show in Croatia and it pushed Markovina into mainstream media. About the same time, he was informed that his contract with the University of Split was not going to be renewed so he lost his job as a university professor. He was later offered a job by Milorad Pupovac to work with the archives at the Serb National Council which he accepted and then left after a few months.

Markovina is known for his opposition to the modern Croatian politics which to him originates from the 1990s. He is a fierce critic of the Franjo Tuđman regime and his modern legacy. He calls for a public recognition of the Croatian war crimes against Serbs in the Croatian War of Independence and possibly his most devoted field of engagement is the defense of the Yugoslav anti-fascist movement in World War II which is marginalised and ignored by the modern Croatia government. He also supports the separation of church and state in Croatia.

He is politically engaged in his hometown of Mostar in Bosnia and Herzegovina. He criticizes the Croat administration in Mostar for dividing the city into 2 parts and for creating a nationalistic rhetoric which promotes hate between Croats and Bosniaks. He also supports the idea that the football club FK Velež Mostar should return to their original stadium. Their original stadium was stolen by the Croatian administration in 1992 and given to the football club HŠK Zrinjski Mostar.

Markovina is a very active writer. His first book from 2014, Between red and black, is one of the first historical books in Croatia which focuses on the effects and disasters of the Croatian right wing government in Split and Mostar during the 1990s. His third book, History of the defeated, is focused on the devastation of Yugoslavian legacy in Croatia.

When it comes to his opinion on political party's in Croatia, he is a strong critic of both HDZ and SDP. For Markovina, HDZ is a right wing nationalist party which promotes hate and SDP is a party that betrayed social democracy.

As a teenager, Markovina was a sympathizer and friend of Stipe Šuvar and his Socialist Labour Party of Croatia in the late 1990s and early 2000s. In 2014, he said on a TV talk show that he is not a member of any party but he believes that the Workers' Front has a perspective and that he wishes them all the best. On 18 December 2016, Markovina alongside other well known intellectuals and civil activists founded the New Left of Croatia, a left wing political party mostly oriented towards social democracy and anti-fascism. He announced his candidacy for Mayor of Split in the 2017 local elections. He received 3.47% of the popular vote in the Mayor elections while the New Left received 4.36% of the popular vote in the City council elections.

In 2017, Markovina has signed the Declaration on the Common Language of the Croats, Serbs, Bosniaks and Montenegrins.

Markovina is a columnist for the national weekly newspaper Telegram, Sarajevo based Oslobođenje, and Tačno.net. He is also member of the PEN branch in Bosnia and Herzegovina.

== Selected publications ==
- —— (2014). Između crvenog i crnog. Split i Mostar u kulturi sjećanja [Between red and black. Split and Mostar in The culture of memory] (in Serbo-Croatian). Zagreb & Sarajevo: Plejada & University press. p. 241. ISBN 978-953-7782-33-7. LCCN 2015378263. OCLC 894119514. CROSBI 695143. COBISS.SR 21208326. COBISS.BIH 21208326.
- —— (2015). Tišina poraženog grada [The silence of the defeated city] (in Serbo-Croatian). Mostar: Centar za kritičko mišljenje. p. 181. ISBN 978-995-8038-21-1. LCCN 2017463187. OCLC 951846657. COBISS.BIH 21869318.
- —— (2015). Povijest poraženih [History of the defeated]. Biblioteka Lijeva (s)kretanja (in Serbo-Croatian). Zagreb: Jesenski i Turk. p. 309. ISBN 978-953-2227-49-9. LCCN 2016447299. OCLC 933797754. CROSBI 836527. COBISS.SR 22964230.
- —— (2015). Jugoslavenstvo poslije svega [Yugoslavism after everything] (in Serbo-Croatian). Belgrade: Beograd MostArt Skripta International. p. 154. ISBN 978-868-4149-91-8. OCLC 940957146. COBISS.SR 218294796.
- —— (2017). Doba kontrarevolucije [The age of counterrevolution]. Biblioteka Tako je bilo (in Serbo-Croatian). Zagreb: Razlog. p. 476. ISBN 978-953-6985-22-7. OCLC 1003044903.
- —— (2018). Usamljena djeca juga [Lonely children of the south] (in Serbo-Croatian). Split: Libros. p. 127. ISBN 978-953-8192-01-2.
- —— (2018). Jugoslavija u Hrvatskoj (1918.-2018.). Od euforije do tabua [Yugoslavia in Croatia (1918–2018). From euphoria to taboo] (in Serbo-Croatian). Zaprešić: Fraktura. p. 204. ISBN 978-953-358-011-1. OCLC 1099286580. COBISS.BIH 4998694.
- —— (2019). Libanon na Neretvi. Kultura sjećanja i zaborava [Lebanon on the Neretva. A culture of memory and forgetting] (in Serbo-Croatian). Mostar: Centar za kritičko mišljenje. p. 145. ISBN 978-9958-0382-9-7. COBISS.BIH 28278022.
- —— (2021). Neum, Casablanca [Neum, Casablanca] (in Serbo-Croatian). Sarajevo: Art Rabic. p. 303. ISBN 978-9926-428-95-2.
