= One Billion Rising =

Global campaign to end violence against women

- Founder: V (formerly Eve Ensler)
- Global Director: Monique Wilson
- Website: onebillionrising.org

One Billion Rising is a global campaign founded by author, playwright and activist V (formerly Eve Ensler), to end rape and sexual violence against women. The "billion" refers to the UN statistic that one in three women will be raped or beaten in their lifetime, or about one billion.

The campaign started in 2012 as part of the V-Day movement and continues annually with new themes. In 2026, the campaign theme is Rise for Our Bodies, Our Earth, Our Future.

== Founding ==
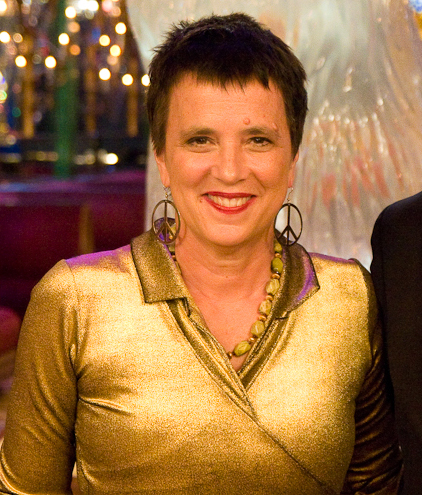
Founder of the campaign Eve Ensler in March 2011

V, known for her play The Vagina Monologues and the organization V-Day, began the campaign in 2012. It was partly inspired by Missouri congressman Todd Akin's "legitimate rape" and pregnancy comments. Shocked by Akin's remarks, Ensler wrote an open letter in response.

== History ==
=== 2013 ===
On February 14, 2013, the One Billion Rising campaign culminated in what the organization called the "biggest mass action to end violence against women," with activists in 207 countries taking part. Singer/songwriter Tena Clark produced a music video entitled "Break the Chain" to accompany the campaign.

Around 5,000 organizations had joined the campaign, which has also been aided or endorsed by celebrities such as Rosario Dawson and Robert Redford.

In a video message dedicated to Jyoti Singh, the Indian student who died after being gang-raped by six men on a Delhi bus, Anoushka Shankar disclosed she had been abused by a trusted friend of her parents when she was a child. In her message, she stated: "I'm rising for women like Jyoti, for women like her. With the amazing women of my country, I'm rising for the child in me, who I don't think will ever fully recover from what happened to her."

=== 2013 ===
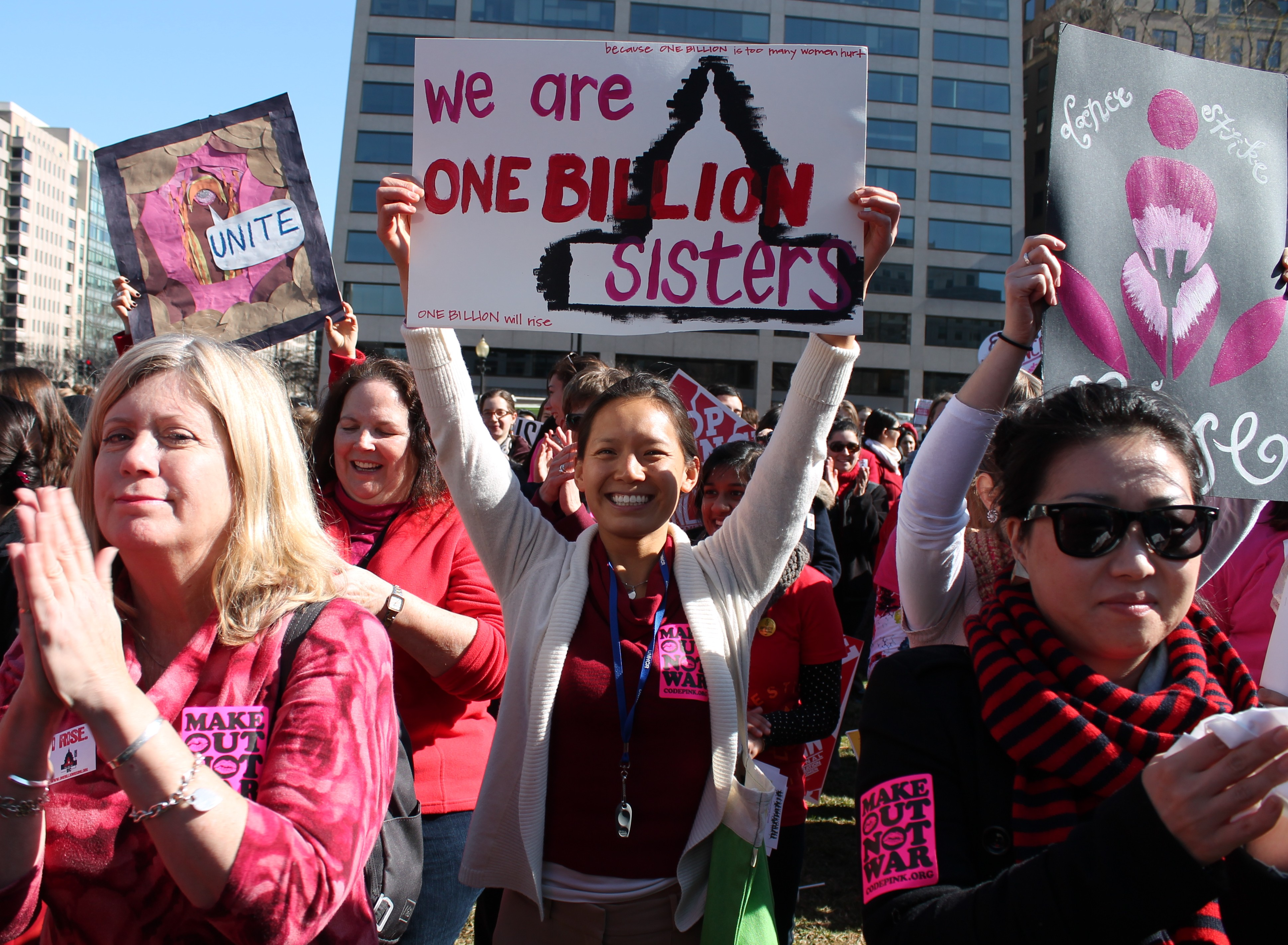
2013, Farragut Square, Washington, D.C.

On February 14, 2013, the rally was held in more than 190 countries after a call for one billion women to dance in a show of collective strength. The event was held on the 15th anniversary of the V-Day movement.

=== 2014 ===
In February 2014, Bollywood actor and filmmaker Aamir Khan, who had earlier voiced such issues through his debut TV show Satyamev Jayate, lent his support to One Billion Rising in New Delhi. In Los Angeles, a number of events were held to protest violence against women soldiers and prisoners. Celebrity participants included Jane Fonda, Anne Hathaway, Marisa Tomei, and Dylan McDermott.

=== 2015 ===
Kimberlé Crenshaw, prominent Critical Race Theory figure and professor at UCLA School of Law and Columbia Law School, joined with One Billion Rising to help create awareness for the difficulties girls of color face in New York and Boston schools. These issues include the school-to-prison pipeline, stereotyping, and the disparity of the suspension rationales and rates compared to white girls (the rates being 10 times more likely for the former).

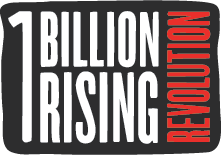
2016 One Billion Rising logo

=== 2016 ===
According to the campaign: "For the fourth year, globally One Billion Rising activists are planning their rising events, artistic uprisings, panel discussions, press conference, town halls, movies, articles, gatherings, poetry, art, posters, actions, and protests to take place on and about Feb 14th. With the theme – One Billion Rising: Rise for Revolution 2016, this year's campaign will escalate the collective actions of activists worldwide, and amplify their call for systemic changes towards ending violence against women and girls once and for all."

=== 2017 ===
The 2017 event was held in February.

== Video ==
In September 2014, the campaign released the One Billion Rising for Justice video, which included footage from amateur and professional videographers from around the world, as well as interviews with global coordinators. In January 2015, the "Rising" video premiered at the Sundance Film Festival in Park City, Utah. For 2016, the "Rising Revolution" series was released with a range of videos that "showcase the collective energy of Revolution by highlighting artistic expressions and RISING victories from around the world with more being added as the campaign unfolds."

== Global coordinators ==
- Monique Wilson – Director
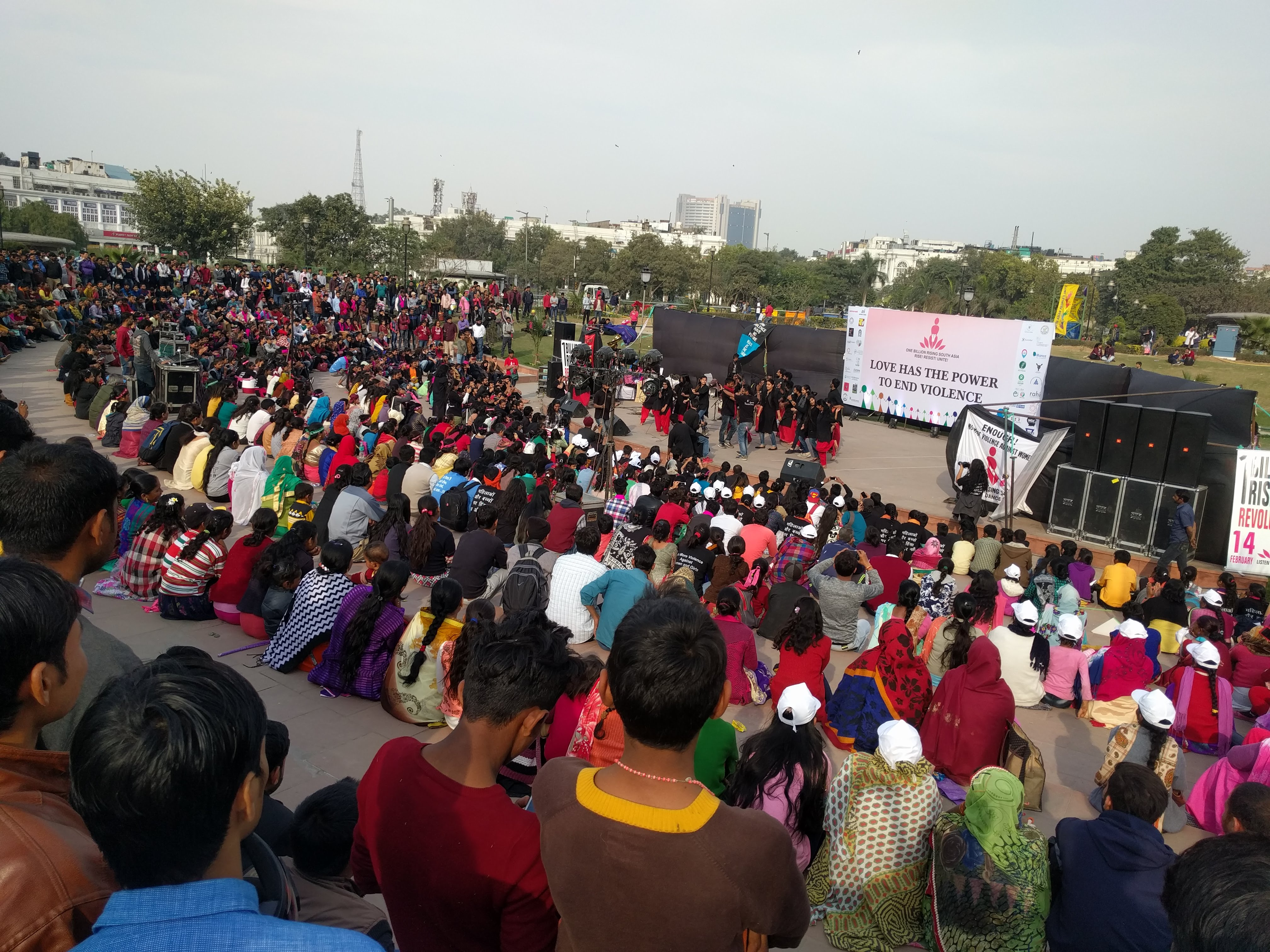
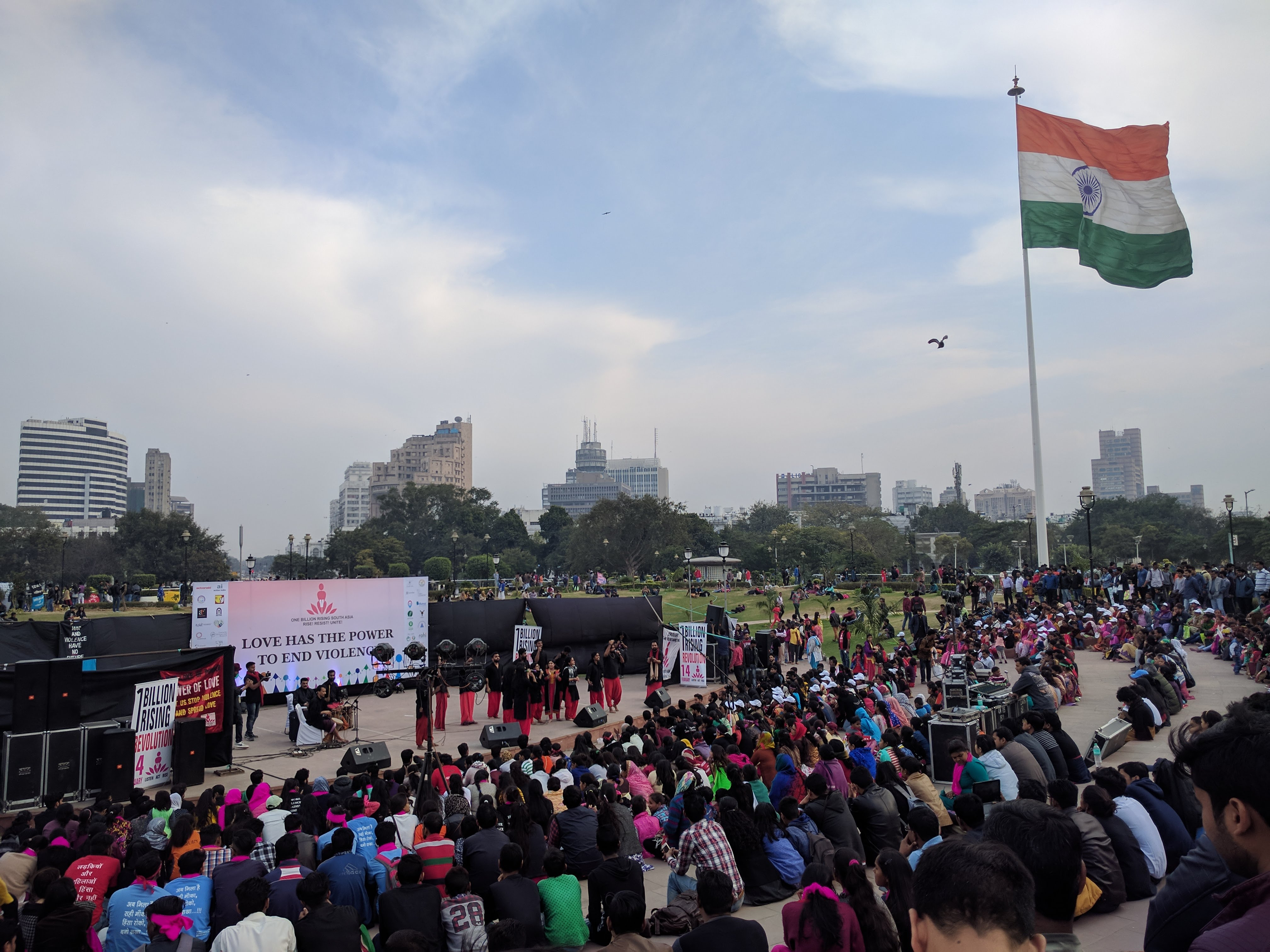
  An event for One Billion Rising in Central Park, Connaught Place, New Delhi, India, in 2018
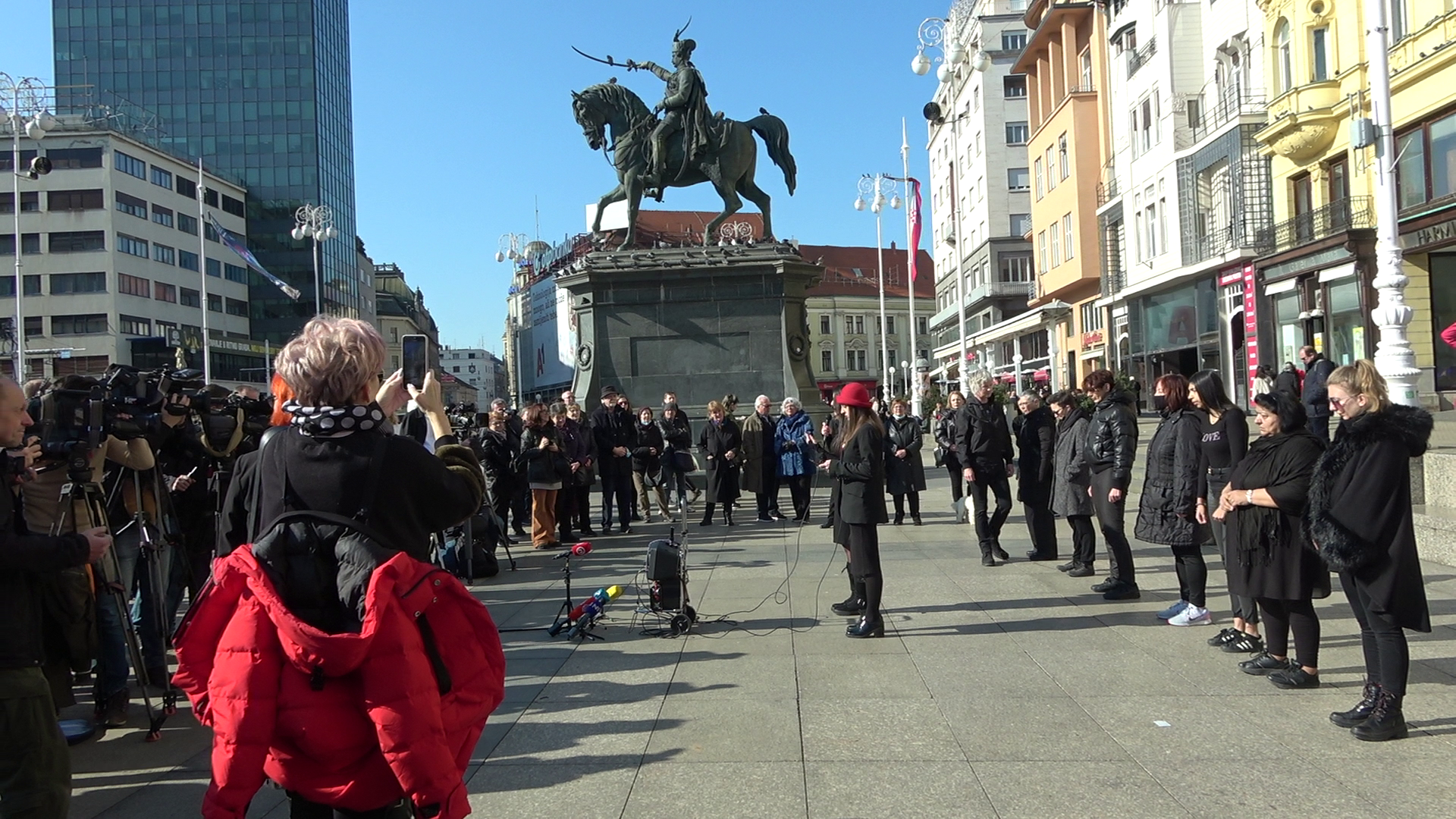
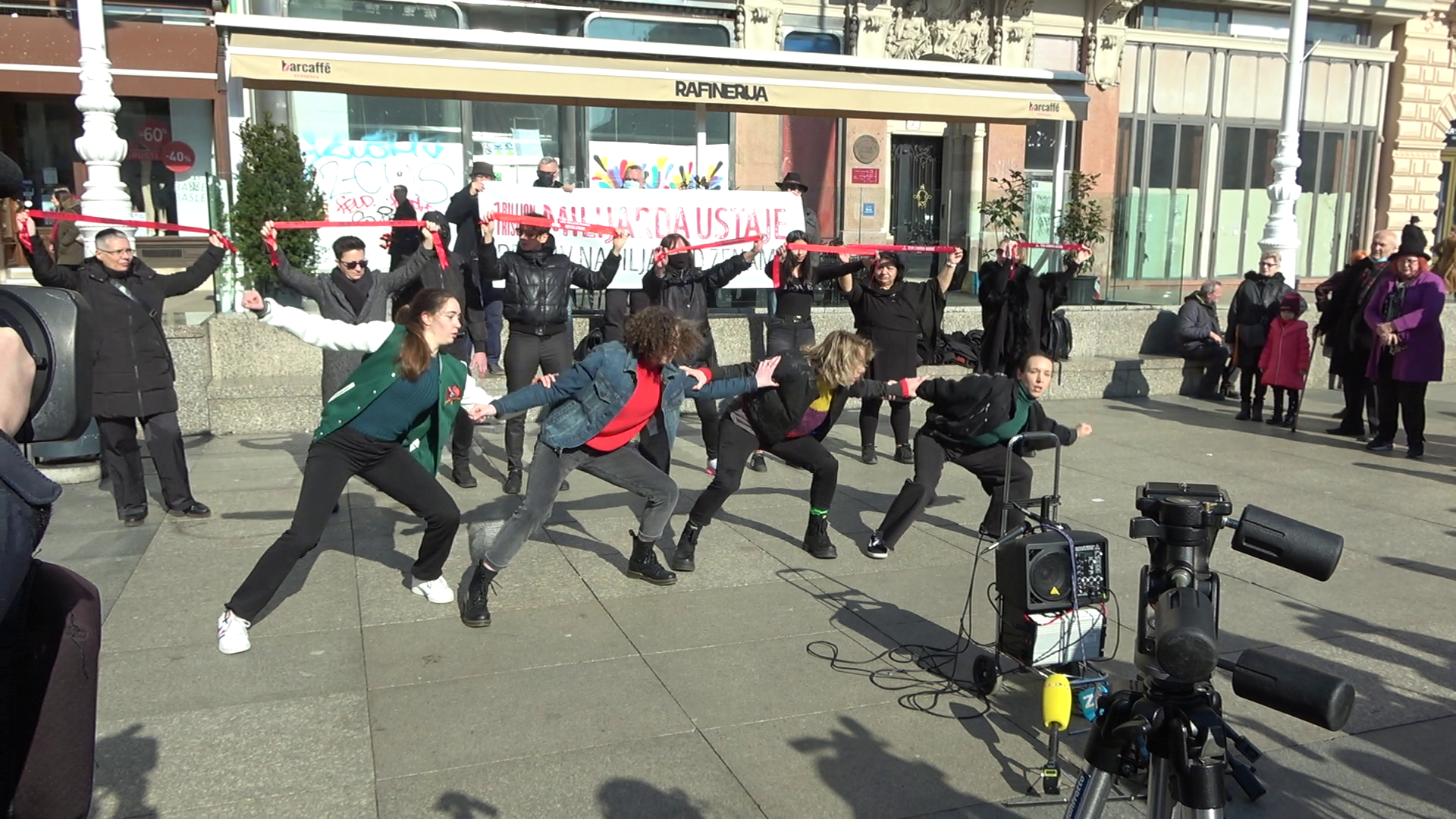
  An event for One Billion Rising at the Ban Jelačić Square in Zagreb, Croatia in 2022.
- Abha Bhaiya / South Asian Feminist Network South Asian Network for Gender Activists and Trainers (SANGAT) – India
- Amy Oyekunle – Nigeria
- Andres Naime – Mexico
- Colani Hlatjwako – Swaziland
- Fahima Hashim – Sudan
- Fartuun A. Adan – Somalia
- Iman Aoun – Palestine
- Isatou Touray – The Gambia
- Khushi Kabir – Bangladesh
- Luisa Rizztelli, Nicoletta Billi – Italy
- Nyasha Sengayi – Zimbabwe
- Rada Borić – Albania, Bosnia and Herzegovina, Bulgaria, Croatia, Cyprus, Greece, Macedonia, Montenegro, Romania, Serbia and Slovenia

== See also ==
- 2012 Delhi gang rape case
- A Rapist in Your Path
- Feminist movement
- Post-assault treatment of sexual assault victims
- Violence Against Women Act
- War on women
