= V-Day (movement) =

Global activist movement to end violence against women and girls

V-Day is a global activist movement to end violence against women and girls started by author, playwright and activist V. V-Day began on February 14, 1998, when the first V-Day benefit performance of V's play The Vagina Monologues took place in New York City, raising over $250k for local anti-violence groups. V-Day was formed and became a 501(c)(3) organization with a mission to raise funds and awareness to end violence against all women and girls (cisgender, transgender, and those who hold fluid identities that are subject to gender based violence). Through V-Day, activists stage royalty free, benefit performances of The Vagina Monologues "to fund local programs, support safe houses, rape crisis centers, and domestic violence shelters, change laws to protect women and girls, and educate local communities to raise awareness and change social attitudes toward violence against women" during the month February, with most of the benefit productions taking place on or about February 14. V has been quoted as saying that it was women's reactions to the play that inspired her and her colleagues to launch V-Day. The 'V' in V-Day stands for Victory, Valentine and Vagina.

Since it launched, thousands of V-Day events have taken place and raised "over 100 million dollars for anti-violence programs across the globe and staged events in more than 200 countries." V-Day helped launch and supports the City of Joy in Congo—"a transformational leadership community for women survivors of violence in the Democratic Republic of Congo, which is owned and run by local Congolese—as well as One Billion Rising, the biggest annual mass action to end violence against women in history."

== About V-Day ==
Since its inception, the movement has expanded its use of art and activism to include screenings and reading—most notably of the documentary V-Day: Until the Violence Stops (2004) and the compilation A Memory, Monologue, a Rant, and a Prayer. Marches and festivals that have been held as part of the movement include UNTIL THE VIOLENCE STOPS: NYC (June 2006), and the ten-year anniversary V TO THE TENTH at the Louisiana Superdome and New Orleans Arena in 2008.

Beginning in early 2001, V-Day activities expanded to the international stage, with V-Day hosting leadership summits for women in Afghanistan and a gathering of activists in Rome. V-Day also launched the Karama program in the Middle East and coordinated community briefings on the missing and murdered women of Ciudad Juárez, Mexico. In some societies where censorship forbids performances of The Vagina Monologues, events revolve around other works developed by V-Day, including the book A Memory, a Monologue, a Rant, and a Prayer, an anthology of writings about violence against women. V-Day included the first ever all transgender version of The Vagina Monologues in 2004, with a performance by eighteen notable trans women under the mentoring of Jane Fonda and Andrea James of Deep Stealth Productions. There are 12 international coordinators who work within their regions to organize events for V-Day. Rada Borić, a Croatian academic, organizes the former Eastern Bloc region.

Consistent growth of the movement led to 5,400 events in 1,500 locations taking place in 2010 alone. It was then estimated that $80 million had been raised since the movement's inception with over 12,000 community-based anti-violence programs and safe houses in The Congo, Haiti, Kenya, Egypt and Iraq receiving funding.

== Mission ==
V-Day aims to tackle issues such as rape and battery of women, incest, female genital mutilation and sex slavery.

The organization seeks to strengthen existing anti-violence efforts by raising money and consciousness, and to lay the groundwork for new educational and protective legislative endeavours for women throughout the world. V-Day's work is grounded in four core beliefs, stated as:

- Art has the power to transform thinking and inspire people to act.
- Lasting social and cultural change is spread by ordinary people doing extraordinary things.
- Local women best know what their communities need and can become unstoppable leaders.
- One must look at the intersection of race, class, and gender to understand violence against women.

== Projects and campaigns ==
With the support of V (formerly Eve Ensler) and the publicity from the V-Day campaign, One Billion Rising, a global protest to end violence and promote justice and gender equality, was founded on February 14, 2013, the fifteenth anniversary of V-Day. The name described a UN and WHO estimate for the number of women in the world who are likely to be raped or beaten at least once. The project urges women and men to dance and rise up in opposition to violence. It has reached over 200 countries in regions such as North Africa, Asia, and the Middle East, with actions in each area dependent on local circumstances, traditions, and religions.

Through V-Day campaigns, local volunteers and college students produce annual benefit performances of The Vagina Monologues, A Memory, A Monologue, A Rant and A Prayer and Any One of Us: Words From Prison. They also offer screenings of the V-Day documentary Until The Violence Stops and the PBS documentary What I Want My Words to Do to You, and conduct Spotlight Campaign Teach-Ins and V-Men workshops, to raise awareness and funds for anti-violence groups within their communities.

Each year V-Day spotlights a particular group of women who are experiencing violence with the goal of putting a worldwide media spotlight on this area and to raise funds to aide groups who are addressing it. For example, V-Day advocated for change throughout the Congo in 2007 by launching the Stop Raping Our Greatest Resource: Power To The Women and Girls of the Democratic Republic of Congo campaign. The 2011 spotlight focused on the women and girls of Haiti. In this year, the efforts in the Congo led to the opening of the survivors community City of Joy in collaboration with Fondation Panzi and UNICEF. Located in Bukavu, the facilities provide 180 Congolese women per year with group therapy, self-defense training, sexuality education, ecology / horticulture education and cultural events.

== Criticism ==
In the early 2000s, some right wing critics attacked V-Day for "hijacking the occasion of Valentine's Day". These conservative critics argued that feminists should not be admonishing people to consider rape, incest and violence on an occasion designed to celebrate love and romance. Individualist feminist Wendy McElroy stated that "V-Day embodies the same double standard and dishonesty that has characterized most feminist pronouncements for decades" and urged people to "take back Valentines Day".

One critique came from Clara Eugenia Rojas in her 2005 publication "The 'V-Day' March in Mexico: Appropriation and Misuse of Local Women's Activism". Following the murders of the women in Ciudad Juárez, V-Day became involved with this cause. Rojas, a local feminist activist, noted that immediately following the discovery of the bodies, there was little that she nor anyone else could do to draw attention to the injustice and need for change. After five years of local activists attempting to promote awareness about the violence, V-Day finally put a spotlight on the incident and made it a global issue. Rojas, although grateful for the global exposure to the incident, believes that V-Day came too late to make much difference and that they were involved for the wrong reasons, i.e., publicity. Rojas also critiques the movement for sidelining the local feminists who were originally attached to this incident and failing to include them in organization or implementation of the march.

Another critique comes from the LGBT (Lesbian, Gay, Bisexual, Transgender) community. In her article "Queerness, Disability, and The Vagina Monologues", Kim Hall explained her dissatisfaction with the V-Day movement and more specifically The Vagina Monologues on an exclusionary basis. Hall believes that the play excludes issues of violence against intersex individuals and perpetuates heterosexism and ableism, or prejudice against people with disabilities. After this critique was published, many performances of The Vagina Monologues began advocating for the Intersex Society of North America by providing literature at the plays and urging the audience to donate.

== See also ==
- Domestic violence
- Rape crisis centers in the United States
- Sexual assault

== Further reading and viewing ==
- "‘This is what solidarity looks like’: an African V-Day against sexual violence" by Caroline Kimeu
- "What happens when you start trusting women? We have the receipts" by V (formerly Eve Ensler) and V-Day activists
- "This Earth Day, Global Women Activists Lead Their Communities in Rising up Against Violence Toward Women and the Earth" by Marianne Schnall and Susan Celia Swan
- "Eve Ensler: The Art of Turning Pain to Power" by James Lescene (The Dramatist, 2018)
- "Happiness in Body and Soul"—Eve Ensler 2004 TED Talk
- "Eve Ensler of 'The Vagina Monologues' on Taking Back Your Power" by Jeryl Brunner (Forbes, February 15, 2018)
- "Say It, Stage It: V-Day at Twenty" by Susan Celia Swan and Purva Panday Cullman
