= Nela Pamuković =

Croatian feminist (born 1959)

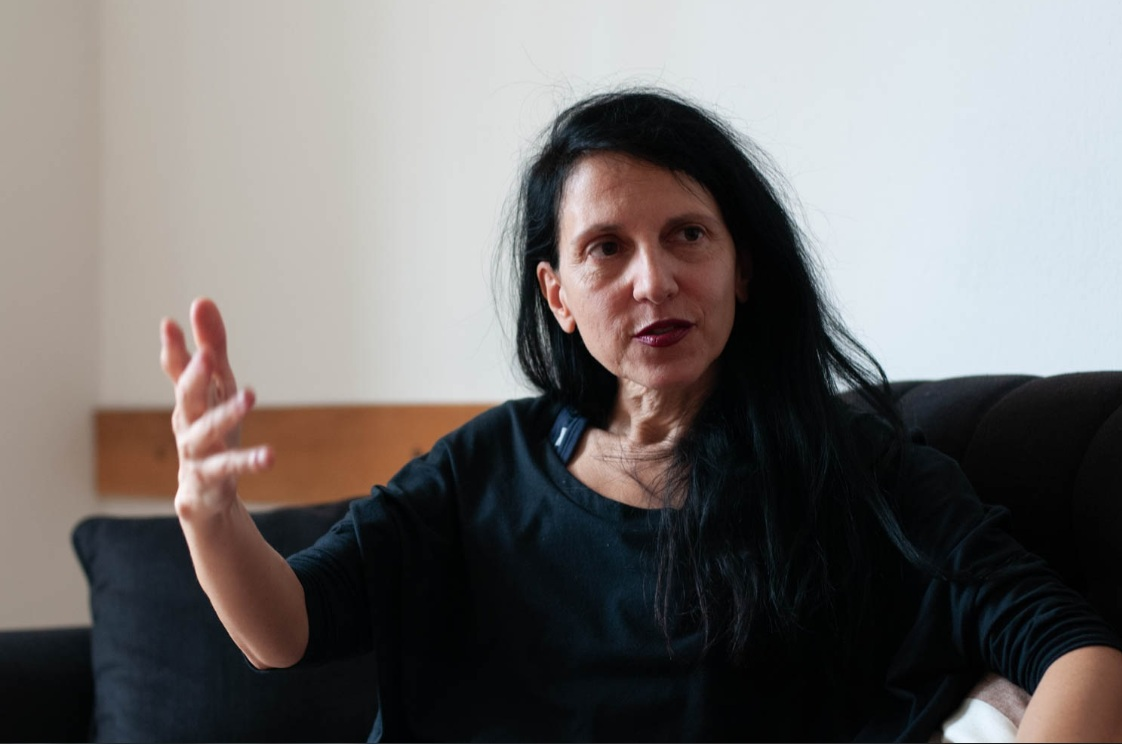
- Pamuković in 2014
- Born: December 25, 1959 (age 66); Šibenik, Yugoslavia
- Occupations: LGBTQ activist; anti-war activist; feminist
- Organization(s): Centre ROSA (1993–present)

Nela Pamuković (born December 25, 1959) is a Croatian feminist, lesbian, anti-war activist who is a pioneer of second-wave feminism in Yugoslavia. She is the co-founder and coordinator of the Centre for Women Victims of War – ROSA (Centre ROSA).

== Biography ==
She was born in 1959 in Šibenik. She spent part of her childhood in Drniš. She has lived in Zagreb since 1969. Before entering in feminism, she studied law in Zagreb. In 1987, she joined the feminist movement and became a member of the lesbian group Lila Initiative, founded in 1989 in Zagreb. Since then, Pamuković has been an active member of several women's organizations and movements in Croatia, and has been a key figure in building a network of feminist communities in socialist Yugoslavia. In 1991, she became a member of the Croatian Anti-War Campaign, and in 1992, during the war in Bosnia and Herzegovina, she co-founded the Centre for Women Victims of War – ROSA in Zagreb. Since 1993, she has been the coordinator of this non-governmental organization, which provides support to women who have survived war, human trafficking and sexual exploitation with counseling, access to legal services and other practical assistance. Also, she is a lecturer on the history of the lesbian and feminist movement at the Center for Women's Studies in Zagreb.

Pamuković has been a co-founder and co-coordinator of the lesbian group Kontra since 1997. She is one of the founders of Zagreb Pride, which was first organized by NGO's Kontra and Iskorak in 2002. She was a member of the Organizing Committee of Zagreb Pride from 2002 to 2006, and with Vesna Teršelič, the representative of Croatia in the Coordination Council of the Coalition for RECOM from 2009 to 2014. She is an activist in the Women's Network of Croatia, the Coalition of Women's Groups SEKA, and the European Women's Lobby Observatory on Violence against Women.

In 2017, Pamuković signed the Declaration on the Common Language of the Croats, Serbs, Bosniaks and Montenegrins.

Preceded by Vesna Kesić	Coordinator of Centre ROSA; 1993–	Incumbent
