= Jirtig =

Sudanese ritual

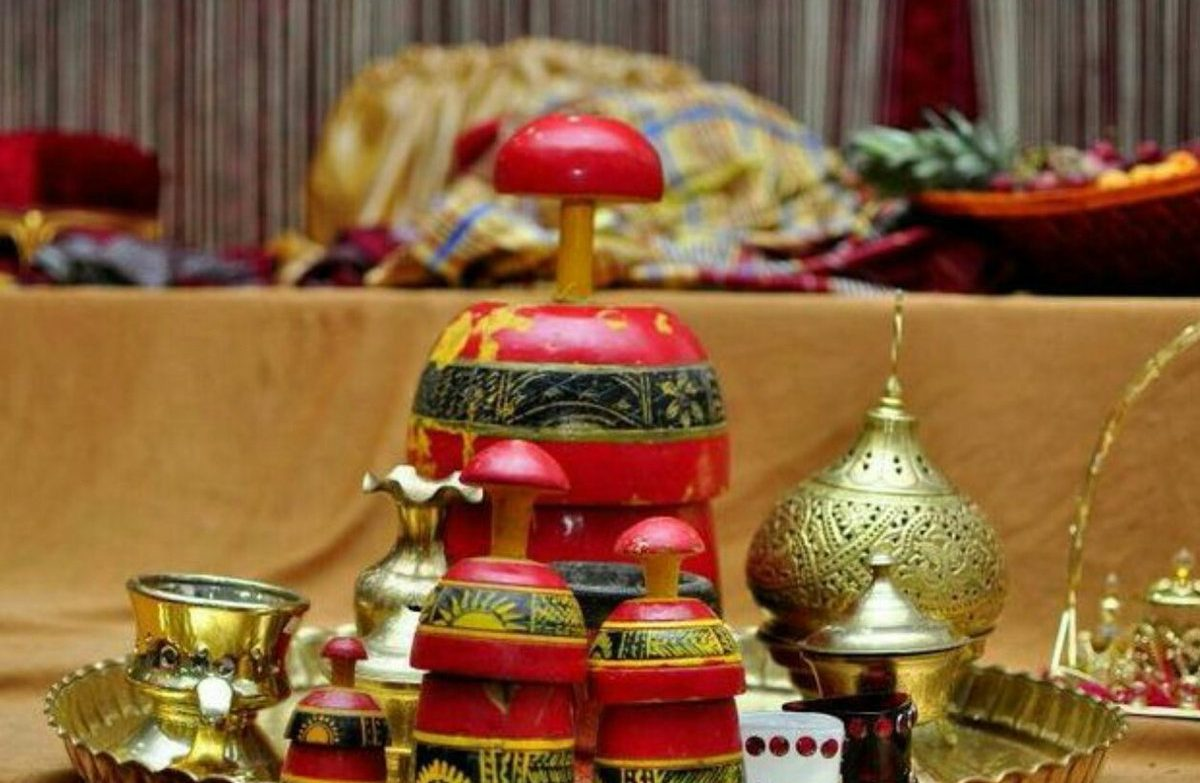
Traditional Jirtig ceremony accessories

The Jirtig (Arabic: الجَرْتِقْ, also spelt Jurtig, Jertiq, Jirtk, and Jartig), or Nqekreh (Arabic: نقِكِريه) in the Nubian regions, is a term applied to a group of rituals that are practised as part of marriage ceremonies and, to a lesser extent, the circumcision of boys, mainly in Sudan. This custom is almost confined to the central and northern Sudan along the Nile and is related to the rites of protection and fertility. The ritual is popular among Nubians tribes including the Danagla, the Ja’aliyin, the Rubatab, the Mirfab, the Manasir and the Shaigiya.

The Jirtig ceremony consists of various elements and is rooted in ancient Sudanese traditions dating back to the Nubian kingdoms in Meroe and Soba. Historically, the Jirtig ceremony draws inspiration from the coronation rituals of ancient Sudanese civilisations, particularly those depicted in Meroitic king depictions found in archaeological sites like the Sun Temple at Musawwarat al-Safra and Naqa'a. It symbolises the installation of kings and carries regal connotations, as the groom assumes the role of a king on this special day. The ceremony occurs in the groom's house before his departure to the bride's family's location.

In December 2025, the Sudanese Jirtig was added to UNESCO's List of Intangible Cultural Heritage in Need of Urgent Safeguarding. The listing highlights its role during conflict and its place in Sudanese cultural identity.

== Etymology ==
Historian Ahmad Moutism Al Shiekh found that the term "Jirtig" is potentially derived from the Meroitic word "Qor," meaning king, and the common phrase "Tig" still used in the Rubatab region. Additionally, words like "mitig," "martig," and "bitig" exist, which signify actions or causing something to be done and likely have Marawitic origins. When these two words are combined, a coined expression is formed, initially as "Qortig" but modified to "Jirtig," which conveys the idea of making or installing someone as a king. The enactment of Jirtig, as a symbolic inauguration represented by the groom, draws inspiration from the cultural heritage embodied by the rituals of crowning kings and rulers in the historical Sudanese kingdoms that followed.

== History ==
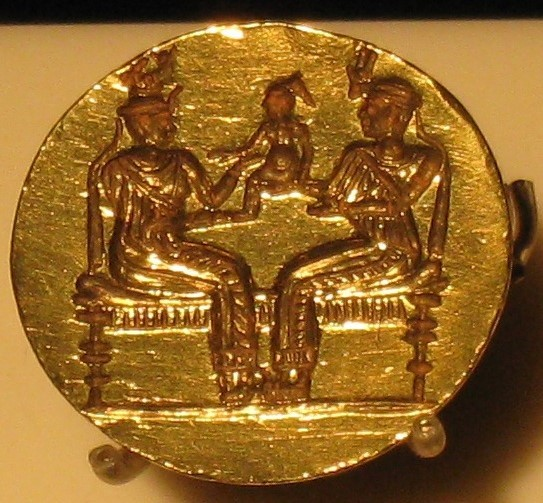
View of the same gold ring found in the treasury of the Queen of Meroe, Amanishakheto housed in the Berlin Museum

The jirtig ritual is an ancient custom that originated in Pharaonic times. It holds great cultural significance and is marked by the participation of the bride and groom, who are wearing red garments. The Sudanese jirtig tradition is primarily associated with wedding ceremonies and, to a lesser extent, with the circumcision of boys in Sudan. It is also practiced in some other social settings such as at the seventh month of pregnancy. The jirtig ceremony is a traditional Sudanese custom similar to the Mehndi rassams in Pakistani culture.

A study focuses on analysing a relic from the treasure of Queen Amanishakheto, a prominent figure who ruled over the Kingdom of Meroe during the first century BC. This treasure is currently housed in the Berlin Museum and showcases a collection of exquisite gold jewellery skilfully crafted by a talented jeweller.

Among the various engraved rings in the collection, a particular finger ring with dimensions of 2.2 cm depicts the Jirtig ritual within the limited space on the ring. The inscription on the ring captures significant elements of the ritual some of which are preserved in more recent times, highlighting the continuation of inherited symbols and practices. Notably, the fine details of the inscription draw attention to the head of a snake positioned prominently in the foreground. Additionally, the depiction of the red birch (Atniba) stands out—a symbolic item still utilised in contemporary jirtig rituals, despite its diminished use as a type of brush. The inscription also showcases the positioning of the man and woman in an opposing stance, which is specific to the jirtig ritual and signifies the exchange of tools and symbols. This particular posture contrasts with the typical sitting position of kings depicted in Meroe's murals.

Another intriguing detail is the presence of a conical bowl beneath the groom's left hand, resembling the milking bowls depicted in certain Meroitic inscriptions. This vessel, tightly woven from palm fronds, continues to be used by many Bedouins in the region for milking and is referred to as Umrah. The ritual of exchanging a container of milk, symbolised by the bowl, still holds significance within the broader fertility and omen rituals.

Examining the groom's side of the inscription, there appears to be a plate or similar object, often used to hold various agricultural products such as grains, legumes, and dates. The exchange of these items between the bride and groom remains a part of contemporary fertility and omen rituals. Interestingly, the inscription emphasises the striking similarity in attire between the bride and groom, deliberately blurring the distinction between men's and women's clothing. This deliberate effort to obfuscate gender identity is a protective measure observed in current jirtig rituals.

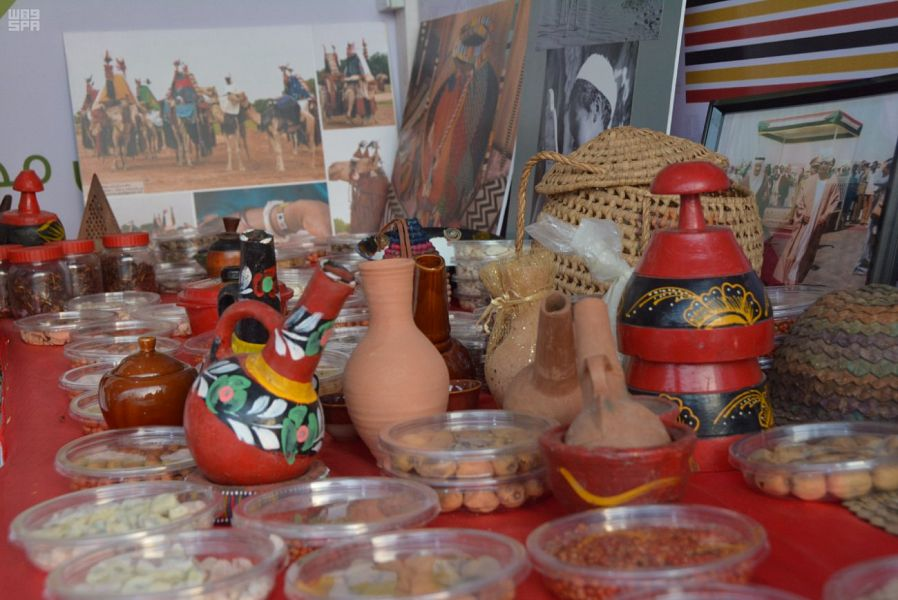
Typical Jirtig set

A common thread between the symbols found in the current jirtig practices and the Meroitic inscription is the presence of a headband worn by the groom. This band, adorned with what could be two feathers and often accompanied by a crescent, continues to be tied to the groom's head in jirtig rituals. Notably, the inscription highlights differences between the groom's crown, featuring two feathers, and the bride's crown, which bears a snake's head—a distinct symbol associated with the crowns worn by Meroitic kings and queens.

== Tools and materials ==
=== Anqarib ===
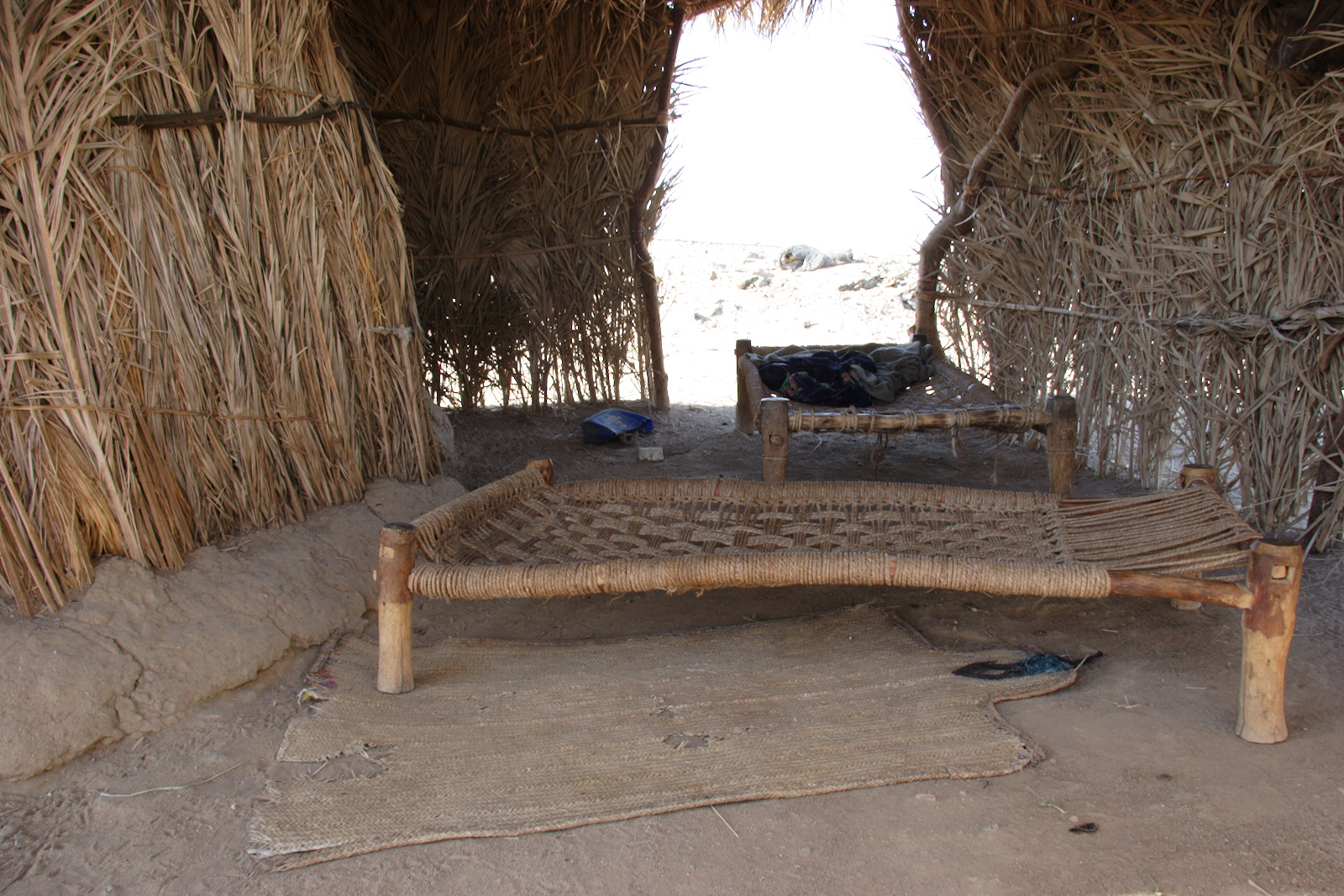
Local bed ('Anqarib) and prayer mat (Birsh Ruba'i) inside the hut of a Bedouin Manasir on the left bank of the Nile in Dar al-Manasir, Northern Sudan

Since the Kingdom of Karma, there was an importance to the Anqarib in funeral rites, as it was found in the cemeteries of that kingdom. It was considered one of the funerary rites that characterised it, and it may be one of the inauguration rites as well.

From what was reported about the Funj period, about the first of their kings, a necktie of cancer was made for him and his wife as well, and they carried him until they camped with them on Moya mountain. When the king became theirs, they usually became close to cancer. In this historical legacy is a Anqarib called the Anqarib of the jirtig, inherited by some families with a long history in government or religious families, as a metaphor for pride and originality.

Recently, it has been made with special specifications and exchanged by families on special occasions. This neck is placed in the centre of the celebration, and a special red sprinkle (ataniba) is woven for this occasion. Recently, a red sheet or carpet has been spread over it. This neck becomes the throne for the groom, after which the inauguration rituals begin.

During traditional wedding Jirtig rituals, the bride and groom would be seated together on a bed or 'angarib, while trusted female relatives would bestow upon them sacred items and apply fragrant oils to their bodies. This practice is said to resemble the ancient Meroitic coronation ceremonies.

=== Crown, band and feathers ===
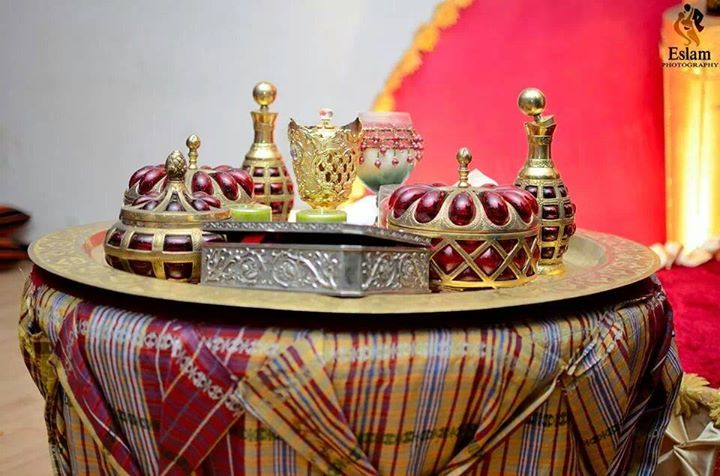
Modern jirtig set

Crowns appear on the heads of the kings of Meroe. We find that this headband bears the symbols of the king in the form of a cobra, and this headband came in the description of one of the deputies of the kings of Nubia in the Christian period, who was described as wearing a headband. We also find that feathers appear in the murals of the Kingdom of Meroe, including the head of a person wearing a headband with a feather on it. Feathers have been known since the Kingdom of Kerma, where they were found on rams' heads in burials. Feathers are still one of the most important rituals in the installation of Rath Shilluk and represent the main component of the crown of Rath.

=== Chains and necklaces ===
One of the most prominent things that draw our attention in the inscriptions and depictions of the kings of Meroe is the wearing of necklaces and chains on their necks and chests, among the symbols of the king. In other historical periods, we find references to chains and necklaces among the symbols of government. In the late Christian period, the al-Anj mentioned the Al-Hakili necklace inherited by Al-Abdallab among the tools they inherited from them. There is a reference to the rulers of the Nile regions, who were called "hammers of making", who ruled the region during the Funj period and who were likely to wear this "hammer" necklace as a symbol of government[13]. During the Funj period, one of the clerics told of his inauguration of the state, "They dressed him in the necklace of Sumit Kanar." There are indications that the rulers of the groups and tribes in central Sudan used to shave their necks with their types of coral and amber, as well as the rosary, including the rosary of ease.

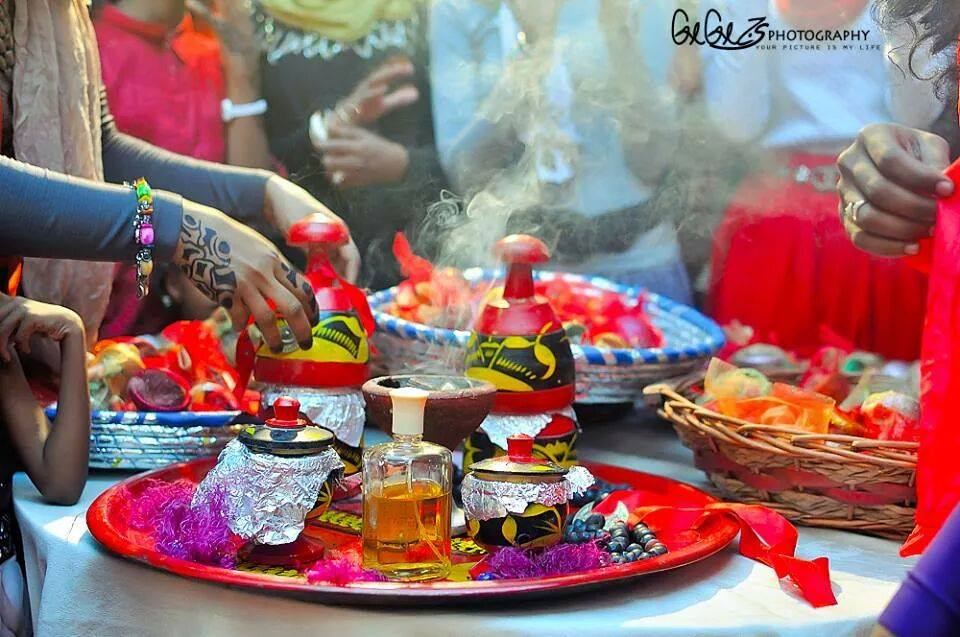
Jirtig ceremony

In imitation of the groom of the kings, we find that among the tools of the jirtiq this contract, when Al-Rabatab "the women of the groom’s family attend a contract of Sumit called Kanar, and we find at Manasir the symbolism of this contract. The Manasirs, in this case, do not decide on any matter until the uncle arrives, when he lowers the hammer or the gold chain on the neck of the groom, which is a notification of the coronation and the start of other ceremonies for them.

=== Bracelet ===
Wearing a bracelet as a symbol of government is found among the kings of Meroe. It was mentioned in the Christian period when describing the owner of the mountain, one of the king’s deputies, who wore the headband "and the golden bracelet." In the Funj period, we find mention of it with one of the clergy members who were inaugurated to the state: "They wore me a bracelet of gold."

The bracelet for the bridegroom has been mentioned by almost all groups that practice the rituals of the groom, such as the Rabatab, the Ja'aleen, the Manasir, and the Shaqiya, and it is one of the most important symbols of authority in the groom's jirtiq.

=== Sword and whip ===
The sword is one of the symbols of power and kingship; we find it in all historical periods since the Kingdom of Meroe and beyond historical periods, and the ruling families continued to inherit some swords that became famous with their names, such as Al-Nimm, Al-Mataq, and kings, rulers, and even leaders of religious families must have a sword that symbolises their authority and glory. Like the sword, the whip had its symbolism. It seems that the whip, which was famous for the whip of the Anag - who ruled the region in the late Christian period - has become one of the most important symbols of power represented by the groom who rises at the end of the jirtiq ceremony "with a sword on his shoulder inside its scabbard and in his hand, a whip of the skin of the hippopotamus." The whip of the Anag is frequently mentioned as a symbol of authority. It was mentioned in the classes about the installation of one of the Sufi poles: "The seven kings of the elves came to him with obedience and docility, and they brought him like a golden grove and a whip of anag." He taps it on the wall of the house and says, "We give the whip," and the appropriate gift is given to him.

=== Bridal attire ===
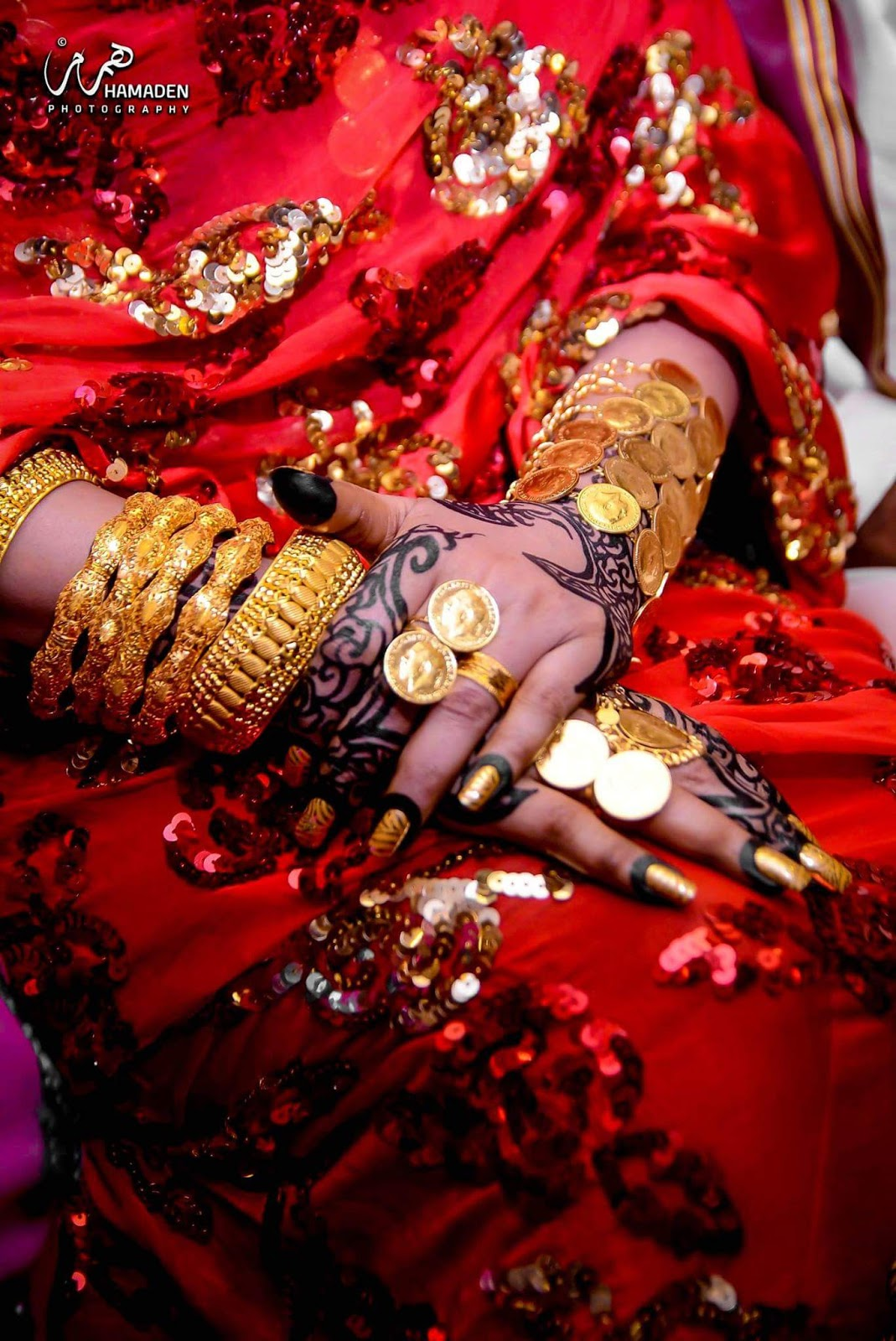
Female attire for the jirtig ceremony

The bride wears a traditional red and gold embroidered thoub.

=== Groom's attire ===
Inherited indicates that the issue of confusion determined the individual's social status and was considered one of the badges of distinction between the nobles and the commoners. In the Funj period, it is indicated that the common people were prohibited from wearing some clothes, such as headgear and stitched clothes, and the perpetrator was punished with a fine. There are types of dress for kings, including silk. The groom's likeness to the king appears when he is wearing the sarti dress, and the antler is one of the clothes reserved for kings. The groom's wearing of these clothes symbolises that the groom is one of the greats and kings distinguished by the right to wear luxurious clothes.

At the time of their inauguration, the kings of Meroe made a long march to the places of the temples in the sacred Jebel Barkal, and they circumambulated some other important temples as an essential part of the coronation ceremonies. Such a march was mentioned by the Funj kings, where they carried the new sultan to Anqarib and walked with him a long distance to a place where there were revenues for them, and they were optimistic about it.

The bridegroom's head is adorned with a decorative tagiya and a prayer cap positioned above the red band that features a silver or gold crescent called hafiza. This headband is believed to symbolise the crown worn by Meroitic kings, adorned with gold and feathers.

== Ritual ==
=== In marriage ===
As previously mentioned, the Jirtiq ceremony of the bridegroom serves as a symbolic initiation that imitates the ancient Sudanese civilisation's coronation ritual of a king. This event holds significance in the cultural memory of the people. The Jirtiq attire consists of several elements. The bride and groom wear the Yusr rosary around their necks, while the Ḥarīra, a red braided band, is tied around their wrists. Silk filaments hang from the knot of the band, and a semi-precious blue stone is attached to it. A gold crescent is positioned on a red ribbon wrapped around the groom's head and fixed at the forehead. The groom also wears a silver bracelet called Jabīira on his right arm. Another ornament known as Kabbāsa or Faraj Allah is worn: a silver circular piece adorned with pearls on either side and a fishbone, forming a necklace.

The grooms also wear Saumīta, a necklace made of a central elongated bead embellished with gold on both ends and hanging from a red filament rope similar to that of Ḥarīra. The front part of both grooms' heads is anointed with some lard known as Wadak. Then, a mixture of mahaleb powder and sandalwood is applied to the same spot, followed by a sprinkle of perfume. This practice, known as Ḍarīra, is carried out by respected married individuals with a reputation for maintaining stable and successful marriages. The Jirtiq ceremony primarily serves as a protective rite and extends beyond wearing specific jewellery on specific occasions. For instance, similar practices of supplications and incantations accompany events like pregnancy, childbirth, and circumcision. These include phrases such as "God willing, a house of money and children" and "God willing, with righteousness and goodness." Incense, water, and milk also play a significant role in the ritual.

During pregnancy, a ritual called Ṭa'n al Ibra, which involves needle piercing, is entrusted to married women who are not infertile or divorced. This rite is accompanied by well-wishing songs like "al-Adil wa al-Zain", which means "the righteous and good."

During the Jirtig ritual, the bride and groom sit on a red-covered wooden bed adorned with embroidered brims. They are surrounded by family members who sing traditional songs and share expressions of joy. This time-honoured tradition remains integral to Sudanese culture, preserving its heritage and fostering community and celebration.

In addition to these traditional rituals, Sudanese weddings are also characterised by their elaborate and colourful attire. The bride wears a "thoob", a long, flowing dress often made of silk or satin and adorned with intricate embroidery and beading. The groom wears a "jalabiya" or a long, loose-fitting robe that is typically made of cotton or linen.

The Jirtig is a typical Sudanese practice, cherished very highly by the society that deems it a basic complement of weddings. The Jirtig ceremony is also considered a good omen and a harbinger for a prosperous and enduring married life, especially by women.

Among the legacies of Sudanese societies in their previous civilisational periods is the belief in the existence of another hidden world of beings and spirits that share a person's life and influence it for good and bad. This unseen world is dealt with through rituals and procedures that prevent its evil and bring its goodness.

In this life cycle period, the bride and groom are in a special state of weakness in front of the evil forces that lurk in human beings. Therefore, all possible protection rituals must be performed to ward off evil and bring good to the newlyweds. One of the rituals of protection, as the Sudanese kings are considered sacred persons who enjoy the care and protection of the gods. Therefore, it is hoped that this protection that the king finds will apply to the groom who imitates him. In the Christian and Islamic periods, the protection of the gods was replaced by the protection of angels, which we find in the depictions of kings in the Christian period. Among the rituals of protection are the walks that the groom performs to the tombs of saints in the region to seek blessings and protection, as well as a visit to the Nile, where the groom purifies himself by diving into the Nile seven times to appease the spirits of the river and its good and evil beings.

Among the rituals that the groom undergoes are his confinement in a narrow place and space in the first week, not exposing him to the sun, and being careful not to go out at specific times at sunrise and sunset, which are called morning donkeys and sunset donkeys, and to carry a sword and whip with him when he goes out in necessities.

It seems that the rituals of protection are obliterating the male groom's personality and showing him as a female among the women who perform the Jirtig process. This is to protect him from evil spirits by misleading them by concealing the true identity of the groom until she thinks he is a member of the group of women around him.

To protect the bride and groom from being targeted by evil spirits and from the evil eye, precautionary measures must be taken for the newlyweds to avoid these dangers of public relations that lead to diseases or childlessness.

Protection rituals are accompanied by some supplications and incantations that are said to ward off the evil eye - to ward off the evil eye or to ask for the help of the Prophet, may God bless him and grant him peace, or his daughter Fatima, or the angels - and the use of various veils and veils is used in these chants.

Jirtig is a ritual observed during marriage ceremonies, serving as a notable rite of passage. This ceremonial practice encompasses three distinct rituals, with the first one specifically tailored for the groom. It occurs within the groom's residence before his departure and subsequent journey to the bride's family's location. During this ritual, a symbolic emulation of the coronation of kings transpires, acknowledging the groom's elevated status on this day as a monarch, complete with all the regal attributes and authority within the groom's familial setting.

The groom's jirtiq ceremony is reminiscent of the ancient Sudanese civilisations' customs surrounding the enthronement of kings, which have been preserved within the collective consciousness, encompassing various practices and cultural elements. Some scholars have drawn attention to the resemblance between the bridegroom's appearance, after completing the rituals associated with the ceremony, donning a ceremonial headdress and a silk cloth adorned with a necklace comprising gold and beads while clutching a sword in his hand. These characteristics are similar to depictions of Meroitic kings found in the Sun Temple at Musawwarat al-Safra and Naqa'a, accompanied by the groom's white "surti" gown adorned with crimson inscriptions. The bride enters, obscuring her visage with a cloth known as the "qarmis," evoking an alluring visual composition characterised by vivid hues, signalling the commencement of the "Jirtig" ceremony.

Among the noteworthy rituals observed during this occasion, sprinkling milk holds particular prominence. It is regarded as an integral ceremonial practice following the application of "darirah," a scented substance prepared using grains and applied to the heads of the bride and groom. Subsequently, the groom partakes in a small portion of milk from a vessel placed on a table, sprinkling it upon the bride, who veils her face. In turn, the bride replicates the gesture, reciprocating the act. Whichever party successfully directs a splash of milk upon the other's countenance is deemed the victor, and jubilant ululation ensues in their honour.

The bride unveils herself by lifting the garmasis veil, which possesses an iridescent shine that offers protection against envious spirits. The garmasis, originally brought from India, holds significance in various rites of passage for both men and women. Mothers wear it after giving birth and throughout the subsequent forty-day confinement period. Similarly, young boys wear it during their circumcision ceremony. Traditionally, the bride would enter the dancing arena, completely enveloped in the garmasis like a mysterious package, revealing herself to the groom. The groom stands below, holding a folded garmasis, as his bride dances. Encircling her waist is the al hagu, a string of beads traditionally crafted with imitation coral and silver balls, which produce a subtle rattling sound. The bridal dance can occur either before or after the Jirtig rituals.

=== Fertility and omen rituals ===
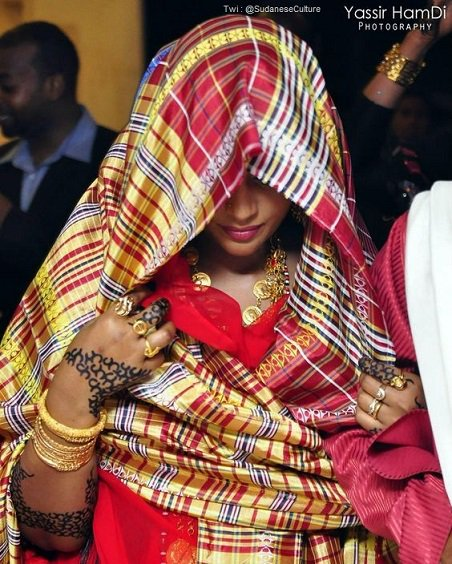
Female attire for the jirtig ceremony during a Sudanese wedding

Among the rituals for the newlyweds together are rituals that symbolise fertility and omen. These rituals occur when the two brides sit with each other on the neck of the special jirtig, and the bride is on the groom’s left. The older women from the groom’s aunts and aunts supervise it, as well as his sisters and some of his female relatives with special characteristics. These moments are considered moments surrounded by great seriousness and rigour. In some regions, the ritual begins with bringing a newborn male child, and it is stipulated that he be in good health, his father and mother are alive, and they enjoy harmony and good conditions in their marriage. The child is placed on the groom's lap, and the groom exchanges it with the bride. Seven times, it is said in this case: "You will be overcome with money, and you will be overcome with children."

A dish (from palm fronds) is brought containing several wheat grains, corn, sesame, cowpeas, dates and other grains grown in the region. The dish is exchanged between the bride and groom seven times, and in some cases, a handful of these grains are taken and exchanged from the groom’s hand to the hand of the groom. The bride and the bride return it to the groom's hand, and they exchange it seven times, and the last time, these grains are dispersed to the groom, the bride, or those present.

Among fertility rituals is tying a group of objects, including the whalebone (fish), which symbolises fertility. A small stick from the Salam tree or a thorn from the Sidr tree may be attached to each of the extended families. Each of the extended families has things they are optimistic about and call Al-Saber – that is, the habit of this family – and it may refer to totem relics. All of this is organised in a braid of red silk with a splint and some green and blue beads, tied in the hand of the groom with the silk.

We also notice that in these rituals, which aim to bring fertility and goodness to the newlyweds, there is an interest in the number seven, which seems to have its characteristics, as it frequently appears in many life cycle rituals in Sudan.

=== Squirting milk ===
The bride and groom each take some milk in a bowl and squirt it in the face of their future partner; for example, the bride and groom spray milk on each other’s faces.

=== The role of women ===
Women have a clear dominance over the procedures of jirtig. There is almost complete absence of men, except for the maternal uncle, who is required to be present at a certain moment in these rituals, and mostly for his role in installing the groom with what is called "the guest of the hammer" or dressing the groom with the contract indicating his installation and accompanies. In the heritage of Jirtig and in the Sumar, the maternal uncle is repeatedly mentioned as the importance of his role in the groom's life. It is also noticeable in the Jirtig rituals the important role of the uncle, which appeared clearly among the Funj kings, in whom the uncle is considered the supervisor of the installation of the king and enjoys a special position. In the rituals of Jirtig, the presence of an uncle is required to install the groom. The groom's clothing of the necklace or gold chain indicating his installation.

The whole process in the jirtiq is carried out by senior women, supervised by the groom's mother or sister, and surrounded by grandmothers, aunts, and aunts. It is clear that the moment of jirtig and its rituals are serious and rigorous moments in which silence and awe prevail, and the rituals are performed with a great deal of craftsmanship, knowledge and caution.

=== Modern ===
The "jirtiq" has become one of the most important marriage customs after it was quietly adopted in the capital, Khartoum. It is usually limited to the close family of the bride and groom only.

Following the bride's donning of the white dress, the groom initiates a ceremonial act by escorting her, marking the commencement of a lively festivity. This contemporary tradition emerged after society embraced global influences. As the ceremony approaches its culmination, the officials responsible for the venue modify the decorations, incorporating red elements to complement the bride's subsequent attire—a transition from the initial white dress to a new ensemble.
