= Centre for Women Victims of War – ROSA =

Croatian non-governmental organization

- Formation: 1992; 34 years ago
- Type: Non-governmental organization
- Headquarters: Zagreb, Croatia
- Services: Women's rights, activism
- Coordinator: Nela Pamuković
- Website: czzzr.hr

The Centre for Women War Victims – ROSA (Croatian: Centar za žene žrtve rata – ROSA) is a Croatian non-governmental, feminist and anti-militarist organisation. It was founded in 1992 with the aim of supporting women, victims of war and other forms of patriarchal violence. The co-founder and coordinator is Nela Pamuković.
