= Dukhan (traditional medicine) =

Medicinal ritual

Dukhan is ritual bodily practice in which the body is smoked with a special (scented) species of wood. The ritual is mainly practiced by married women and women preparing for marriage in northern Sudanese provinces, although men also conduct it occasionally to treat rheumatic pain. However, the practice of dukhan is not performed amongst men frequently. In fact, the Northern Sudanese culture frowns upon the practice amongst men. The technique is considered a traditional medicinal technique in Southern Sudan.

The practice of taking a dukhan has many purported health benefits such as smoothing the skin, and narrowing of the vagina with women (the latter being useful after childbirth). It also gives the skin a pleasant scent (due to the wood species used, usually Vachellia seyal, locally referred to as talh). Dukhan is said to also be useful for treating syphilis, gonorrhea and rheumatic pain. In this circumstance, various medicinal plants (such as tundub, natron) are used instead. Dukhan is often followed by dilka (scented massage).

The ritual goes as follows: a woman is anointed with karkar (scented oil) and strips naked (only covered with a shamla; a thick local woolen blanket) on a seat with a hole in the center. Below this seat, a fire is lit in a pit and scented wood is placed on it, producing smoke. She remains seated until the heat becomes unbearable.

A study has suggested that the practice can induce genotoxic effects in both bacterial and human C3A cells, opening the door to the possibility that regularly partaking in dukhan can have adverse health effects.

== See also ==
- Smoking (cooking)
