= Child marriage in Sudan =

Child marriage in Sudan is prevalent. In 2017 in Sudan, 34% of girls were married off before they turned 18 years old. 12% were married before they turned 15. Sudan is the 29th highest nation in the world for child marriage.

== Legal age of marriage ==
The current legal marriage age for children in Sudan is at age 18, after the nation removed all exemptions to the African Charter on the Rights and Welfare of the Child (ACRWC) in late 2020. This ratified all articles and explicitly outlawed child marriage. Previously, there was lax legislation and the legal marriageable age was 10.
