= 2021 Zagreb local elections =

Local elections

- 16 May 2021; 30 May 2021 (runoff for mayor)
- Mayoral election
- Turnout: 47.14% (first round) ▲6.00 pp 45.07% (runoff) ▲3.93 pp
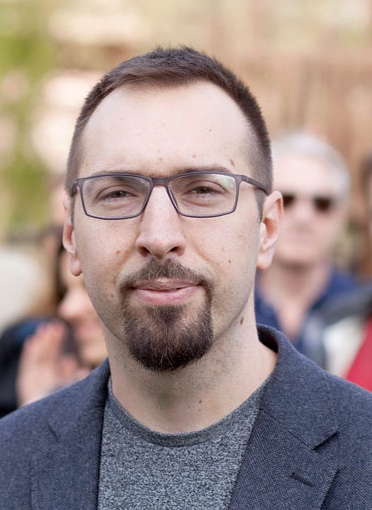

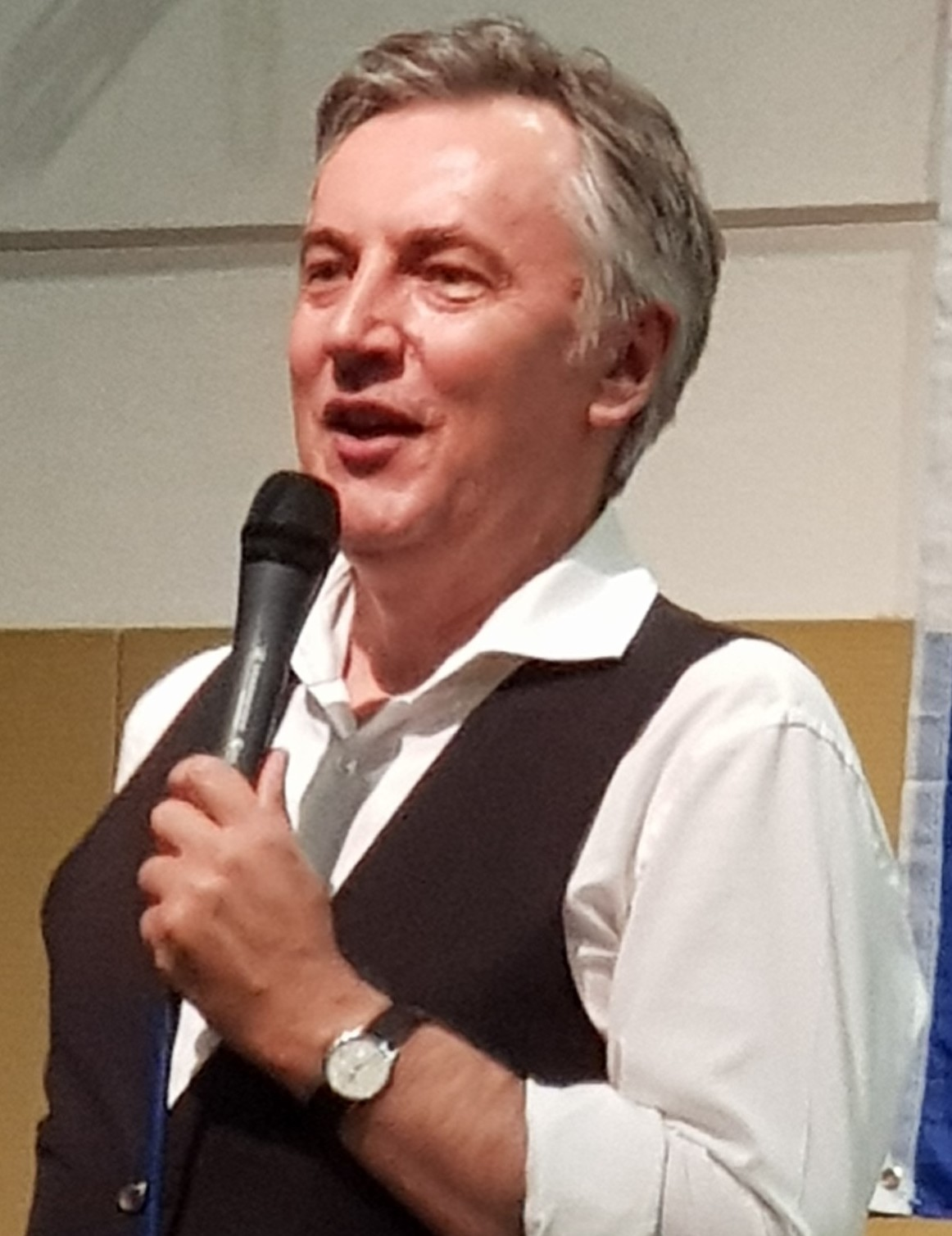
Candidate	Tomislav Tomašević	Miroslav Škoro
Party	We Can!	DP
Alliance	Green-Left Coalition	DP-ZL
First round	147,631; 45.15%	39,789; 12.16%
Runoff	199,630; 63.87%	106,300; 34.01%
Mayor before election
Jelena Pavičić Vukičević (Acting)
BM 365
Elected mayor
Tomislav Tomašević
We Can!
- Assembly election
- All 47 seats in the Zagreb Assembly; 24 seats needed for a majority
Party	Leader	Vote %	Seats	+/–
Green–Left	Tomislav Tomašević	40.83	23	+20
HDZ coalition	Mislav Herman	11.30	6	−8
DP coalition	Miroslav Škoro	10.59	5	+4
BM 365	Jelena Pavičić Vukičević	9.04	5	−6
SDP	Joško Klisović	8.88	5	−2
Most	Zvonimir Troskot	6.20	3	+3
This lists parties that won seats. See the complete results below.
Speaker before	Speaker after
Mislav Herman; HDZ	Joško Klisović; SDP

Elections were held in Zagreb on 16 May 2021 for the 53rd mayor of Zagreb, the two deputy mayors, the 47 members of the Zagreb Assembly, the councils of districts and the local committees, as part of the 2021 Croatian local elections. The runoff for the mayor took place on 30 May 2021.

As Zagreb, being the national capital, is the only Croatian city to enjoy a special status within Croatia's regional administrative framework (being both a city and a county), the mayor of Zagreb likewise also enjoys a status equal to that of a county prefect (Croatian: župan) of one of Croatia's other 20 counties (Croatian: županija). The city's county-level status is also highlighted in the name of its legislature, which is uniquely styled as a city assembly (Croatian: skupština; a term reserved for units with regional self-government, i.e. counties), and not as a city council (Croatian: vijeće; which is used for units with local self-government, i.e. cities and municipalities).

The elections followed in the wake of the late February death of long-time Zagreb mayor Milan Bandić. Since the start of the campaign, and especially in May 2021, polling for mayor had consistently placed left-wing social activist and environmental researcher, Tomislav Tomašević, clearly in the lead, with 30–40 percent of the vote (as was also the case with his Green–Left Coalition in the Assembly election). Meanwhile, the candidates of Croatia's two major parties – the HDZ and the SDP, were well behind, as were conservative musician-turned-politician Miroslav Škoro, acting mayor Jelena Pavičić Vukičević and former Minister of Justice Vesna Škare-Ožbolt. In the week leading up to the election, several candidates filed charges against one of the polling agencies, Akter Public, accusing it of influencing public opinion to benefit Miroslav Škoro over several other candidates. Akter Public issued a denial, while Škoro's Homeland Movement admitted that it had engaged in business transactions with Akter Public.

The first round of the mayoral election, held on 16 May 2021, was convincingly won by leftist candidate Tomislav Tomašević (with 45.15%), while right-wing nationalist Miroslav Škoro finished a distant second (with 12.16%). Furthermore, Tomašević's number of votes is the highest of any first round candidate since the introduction of direct mayoral elections in 2009. However, as no candidate received a majority of the votes, a run-off took place on 30 May 2021. Tomašević was elected mayor with 63.87% of the vote, against Škoro's 34.01%. In addition, just as was the case in the first round, Tomašević's second round performance once more set a new record for the number of votes received by a mayor candidate in Zagreb. Namely, his almost 200 thousand votes was larger by nearly 30,000 than that which Milan Bandić received in the second round of the 2013 election.

Meanwhile, in the Assembly election, the Green–Left Coalition won 23 of out the 47 seats (thus falling just one seat short of an overall majority), and later entered into a coalition with the centre-left Social Democratic Party, which won 5 seats.

== Background ==
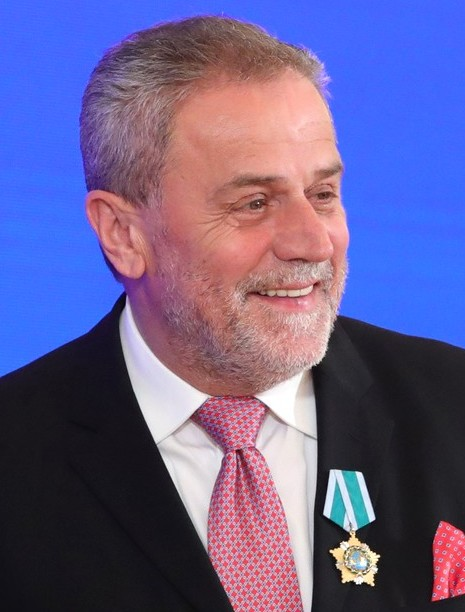
Six-term mayor Milan Bandić (BM 365) was seeking re-election but died during the pre-election campaign period, after 17 years and 165 days in office.

The longest-serving and six-time elected mayor of Zagreb, Milan Bandić, died from a heart attack on 28 February 2021, less than three months before the election. Following his death, one of the deputy mayors, Jelena Pavičić Vukičević, temporarily assumed the powers and duties of mayor. Also, she became the acting president of the Bandić's Labour and Solidarity Party. It will thus be the first time since the 1997 elections that Bandić won't be running for the mayorship.

The Croatian government officially called the election on 14 April 2021, with the potential candidates then having two weeks to collect the number of signatures required by the Law on Local Elections.

== Campaign ==
=== Pre-election period and first round ===
The election is taking place during the global COVID-19 pandemic, which has affected more than 63,000 people in Zagreb and caused over 2,000 deaths in the city, as of May 2021. Furthermore, Zagreb is still recovering from a series of natural disasters which struck the city during 2020. Namely, a major earthquake occurred in the city on 22 March 2020 and caused extensive damage to historic buildings. Then, nine months later, an even stronger earthquake in Petrinja only further weakened already damaged structures in Zagreb. Therefore, one of the main topics of the campaign is the adoption of a law on reconstructing the affected areas of the city.

Other major campaign issues include the troubling state of the city's finances, its allegedly oversized bureaucratic apparatus, as well as the corruption, nepotism and cronyism which took place during the Bandić administration.

=== Second round ===
On the night of 16 May 2021, when it became clear that no candidate had won enough votes for an outright victory, and when it was increasingly apparent that Tomislav Tomašević and Miroslav Škoro would thus face each other in a run-off, Škoro declared to his supporters that "regardless of who will win – Jelena Pavičić Vukičević, Davor Filipović or Miroslav Škoro" he would "stand against the left, especially a left of this kind, which has often shown that it contains elements of that to which neither Croatia nor Zagreb should return". He furthermore stated that the Green–Left Coalition is "neither green nor left, but extremely left". Such statements may be signaling a campaign which will be highly ideologically polarised between progressive and traditionalist voters. Austrian Der Standard wrote that Škoro's statements polarise the right-wing voters and could cause some to turn against him in the runoff.

The Independent and German Frankfurter Allgemeine Zeitung described the unexpectedly high vote shares attained by Tomašević and We can! as an upset for the ruling Croatian Democratic Union (HDZ). The Frankfurter Allgemeine Zeitung wrote that "anything but a new victory for [Tomašević on 30 May] would be a sensation", and called the Croatian local elections a disaster for Croatia's biggest left-wing party, the SDP, which won just 8.9 percent of the vote for the Zagreb Assembly and generally performed poorly across the country. Zagreb was described as a possible "springboard" for the green politics of We can! in the national political arena, should their campaign promises be executed and should the fight against Bandić's "corruption and clientelism" succeed.

== Mayoral candidates ==
On 30 April 2021, the State Electoral Commission (SEC) confirmed that ten potential candidates had submitted at least 5,000 valid signatures from registered voters, and that they, as well as their running mates, had thus qualified to be official candidates for mayor and deputy mayor.

Candidate	Party affiliation	Running mates	Party affiliation	Notes about the candidate	Proof of nomination
Davor Filipović	Croatian Democratic Union	Iva Hraste-Sočo	Croatian Democratic Union	Associate professor at the Faculty of Economics of the University of Zagreb. Member of the Zagreb Assembly.	Submitted 13,000 signatures to the State Electoral Commission on 29 April 2021.
Davor Filipović	Croatian Democratic Union	Mirjana Kujundžić Tiljak	Croatian Democratic Union	Associate professor at the Faculty of Economics of the University of Zagreb. Member of the Zagreb Assembly.	Submitted 13,000 signatures to the State Electoral Commission on 29 April 2021.
Joško Klisović	Social Democratic Party	Dina Vasić	Independent	Former Deputy Minister of Foreign and European Affairs.	Submitted 6,500 signatures to the State Electoral Commission on 29 April 2021.
Joško Klisović	Social Democratic Party	Renato Petek	Independent	Former Deputy Minister of Foreign and European Affairs.	Submitted 6,500 signatures to the State Electoral Commission on 29 April 2021.
Anka Mrak-Taritaš	Civic Liberal Alliance	Mirando Mrsić	Democrats	Member of the Croatian Parliament for the Croatian People's Party – Liberal Democrats (2016–2017) and the Civic Liberal Alliance (2017–present). Runner-up in the 2017 Zagreb election.	Submitted 6,206 signatures to the State Electoral Commission on 28 April 2021.
Anka Mrak-Taritaš	Civic Liberal Alliance	Marko Torjanac	Independent	Member of the Croatian Parliament for the Croatian People's Party – Liberal Democrats (2016–2017) and the Civic Liberal Alliance (2017–present). Runner-up in the 2017 Zagreb election.	Submitted 6,206 signatures to the State Electoral Commission on 28 April 2021.
Davor Nađi	Focus	Davor Huić	Focus	Member of the Croatian Parliament for Focus (2020–present). Former Deputy Mayor of Sveta Nedelja.	Submitted 6,000 signatures to the State Electoral Commission (as announced by Nađi on Facebook).
Davor Nađi	Focus	Mario Kolar	Focus	Member of the Croatian Parliament for Focus (2020–present). Former Deputy Mayor of Sveta Nedelja.	Submitted 6,000 signatures to the State Electoral Commission (as announced by Nađi on Facebook).
Jelena Pavičić Vukičević	Bandić Milan 365	Ivica Lovrić	Bandić Milan 365	Incumbent First Deputy Mayor of Zagreb (2017–2021) and Acting Mayor of Zagreb (2021). Second Deputy Mayor of Zagreb (2009–2013).	Submitted 12,000 signatures to the State Electoral Commission on 22 April 2021.
Jelena Pavičić Vukičević	Bandić Milan 365	Otto Barić	Independent	Incumbent First Deputy Mayor of Zagreb (2017–2021) and Acting Mayor of Zagreb (2021). Second Deputy Mayor of Zagreb (2009–2013).	Submitted 12,000 signatures to the State Electoral Commission on 22 April 2021.
Vesna Škare Ožbolt	Independent	Kristina Sušac	Independent	Lawyer. Former Minister of Justice (2003–2006).	Submitted 8,000 signatures to the State Electoral Commission on 29 April 2021.
Vesna Škare Ožbolt	Independent	Ivan Slade Šilović	Independent	Lawyer. Former Minister of Justice (2003–2006).	Submitted 8,000 signatures to the State Electoral Commission on 29 April 2021.
Miroslav Škoro	Homeland Movement	Slaven Dobrović	Homeland Movement	Folk musician. Independent presidential candidate in the first round of the 2019–20 election. Member of the Croatian Parliament for the Croatian Democratic Union (2008) and the Homeland Movement (2020–present), and a Deputy Speaker of Parliament (2020–present).	Submitted 14,000 signatures to the State Electoral Commission on 27 April 2021.
Miroslav Škoro	Homeland Movement	Ana Lederer	Bloc for Croatia	Folk musician. Independent presidential candidate in the first round of the 2019–20 election. Member of the Croatian Parliament for the Croatian Democratic Union (2008) and the Homeland Movement (2020–present), and a Deputy Speaker of Parliament (2020–present).	Submitted 14,000 signatures to the State Electoral Commission on 27 April 2021.
Željko Tokić	Independent	Brunela Rajilić	Independent	Entrepreneur. Nominated by a group of registered voters.	Submitted an undisclosed number of signatures to the State Electoral Commission.
Željko Tokić	Independent	Tena Tuzla	Independent	Entrepreneur. Nominated by a group of registered voters.	Submitted an undisclosed number of signatures to the State Electoral Commission.
Tomislav Tomašević	We can!, Zagreb is OURS	Danijela Dolenec	We can!, Zagreb is OURS	Member of the Croatian Parliament for We can! (2020–present). Member of the Zagreb Assembly.	Submitted 20,236 signatures to the State Electoral Commission on 29 April 2021.
Tomislav Tomašević	We can!, Zagreb is OURS	Luka Korlaet	We can!, Zagreb is OURS	Member of the Croatian Parliament for We can! (2020–present). Member of the Zagreb Assembly.	Submitted 20,236 signatures to the State Electoral Commission on 29 April 2021.
Zvonimir Troskot	Bridge of Independent Lists	Iva Rem	Bridge of Independent Lists	Economist. Member of the Croatian Parliament for the Bridge of Independent Lists (2020–present).	Submitted 8,700 signatures to the State Electoral Commission on 29 April 2021.
Zvonimir Troskot	Bridge of Independent Lists	Dajana Paušić Podhraški	Bridge of Independent Lists	Economist. Member of the Croatian Parliament for the Bridge of Independent Lists (2020–present).	Submitted 8,700 signatures to the State Electoral Commission on 29 April 2021.

=== Failed candidates ===
The following individuals failed to submit signatures to the State Electoral Commission by the deadline on 29 April 2021.

- Ljubomir Majdandžić (Ind.), associate professor at the Faculty of Economics, University of Rijeka and a HSS member
- Marina Pavković (Ind.), architect
- Srećko Sladoljev (HČSP), physician and immunologist
- Milivoj Špika (BUZ), professor of kinesiology
- Željko Uhlir (HNS), current State Secretary of Construction, Spatial Planning and State Property

=== Withdrawn candidates ===
These individuals withdrawn their bids as candidates for the mayor.

- Otto Barić (Ind.), architect, son of Otto Barić
- Mirando Mrsić (Democrats), physician and a former Minister of Labour and Pension System
- Renato Petek (Ind.), member of the Zagreb Assembly
- Ivica Relković (Ind.), political analyst
- Herman Vukušić (Ind.), psychiatrist

== Results ==
=== Mayoral election ===
On 30 April 2021, the State Electoral Commission (SEC) announced that 10 candidates had presented enough valid signatures from registered voters in order to be placed on the ballot in the elections for the mayor of Zagreb.

Candidates		First round		Second round	
Candidate	Party	Votes	%	Votes	%
Tomislav Tomašević	We Can! / Zagreb is OURS!	147,631	45.15	199,630	63.87
Miroslav Škoro	Homeland Movement	39,789	12.16	106,300	34.01
Jelena Pavičić Vukičević	Bandić Milan 365	36,309	11.10		
Davor Filipović	Croatian Democratic Union	32,151	9.83		
Joško Klisović	Social Democratic Party	25,601	7.82		
Vesna Škare Ožbolt	Independent	16,682	5.10		
Zvonimir Troskot	Bridge of Independent Lists	13,480	4.12		
Davor Nađi	Focus	6,492	1.98		
Anka Mrak-Taritaš	Civic Liberal Alliance	2,743	0.83		
Željko Tokić	Independent	1,298	0.39		
Total:		322,176	98.60%	305,930	97.93%
Invalid votes:		4,589	1.40%	6,456	2.07%
Uncast ballots:		210	–	148	–
Turnout:		326,975	47.14%	312,534	45.07%
Registered voters:		693,645		693,509	
The percentage of the vote for each candidate is calculated from the number of total ballots (including invalid, blank and uncast ballots); The percentages of valid and invalid votes are calculated from the number of total ballots, but excluding uncast ballots The turnout percentage is calculated from the number of registered voters

=== Assembly election ===
On 30 April 2021, the State Electoral Commission (SEC) announced that 22 party lists, independent lists and voters' group candidate lists had presented enough valid signatures from registered voters in order to be placed on the ballot for the elections to the Zagreb Assembly.

The Zagreb City Assembly has 47 members elected by proportional representation in a single city-wide electoral constituency. In order to qualify for legislative representation, a party or coalition must receive at least 5% of the number of valid votes cast in an election. The method used to distribute seats among such parties or coalitions is the D'Hondt method.

Graph of the party split among 47 seats.
Party list	Previous seats	Votes	%	Seats	%	Seat change
We Can! Zagreb is Ours! New Left; Green Alternative - Sustainable Development of Croatia; For the City	4 / 51	130,850	40.83	23 / 47		▲19
Croatian Democratic Union; Croatian Social Liberal Party; Croatian Party of Pensioners	14 / 51	36,232	11.30	6 / 47		▼8
Homeland Movement; Green List	1 / 51	33,943	10.59	5 / 47		▲4
Bandić Milan 365 - Labour and Solidarity Party	11 / 51	28,996	9.04	5 / 47		▼6
Social Democratic Party of Croatia	7 / 51	28,456	8.88	5 / 47		▼2
Bridge of Independent Lists	0 / 51	19,872	6.20	3 / 47		▲3
Independent list of Vesna Škare Ožbolt	0 / 51	14,247	4.44	0 / 47		0
Focus	0 / 51	7,302	2.27	0 / 47		0
Croatian Sovereignists; Croatian Conservative Party; Hrast - Movement for a Successful Croatia; Independents for Croatia; Croatian Party of Rights; Generation of Renewal	0 / 51	3,130	0.97	0 / 47		0
Centre	0 / 51	2,909	0.90	0 / 47		0
Civic Liberal Alliance; Democrats	0 / 51	2,537	0.79	0 / 47		0
Bloc of Pensioners Together	0 / 51	2,285	0.71	0 / 47		0
Agramers – Independent List	0 / 51	1,801	0.56	0 / 47		0
Workers' Front	1 / 51	1,385	0.43	0 / 47		▼1
Authentic Croatian Peasant Party; Croatian Peasant Party of Stjepan Radić; Croatian Radić Party; Let's Change Croatia; Croatian Party of all Chakavians, Kajkavians and Shtokavians	0 / 51	1,286	0.40	0 / 47		0
Independent List of Tomislav Stojak	0 / 51	1,143	0.35	0 / 47		0
Independent list of Željko Tokić	0 / 51	1,030	0.32	0 / 47		0
Zagorje Party	0 / 51	719	0.22	0 / 47		0
Croatian People's Party - Liberal Democrats	1 / 51	647	0.20	0 / 47		▼1
Authentic Croatian Party of Rights	0 / 51	640	0.19	0 / 47		0
Movement for a Modern Croatia	0 / 51	520	0.16	0 / 47		0
People's Party - Reformists	1 / 51	473	0.14	0 / 47		▼1
Total:		320,403	98.16	47	100%	▼4
Invalid votes:		6,007	1.84			
Turnout:		326,680	47.09			
Registered voters:		693,670				
The percentages of votes from each list are calculated from number of valid voters The percentages of valid and invalid votes are calculated from the turnout number The turnout percentage is calculated from the number of registered voters

=== Elected lists and candidates ===
Six lists received at least 5% of the valid votes cast on 16 May 2021, making them eligible to take part in the distribution of seats using the D'Hondt method. The party list with the most elected candidates was the Green-Left Coalition, followed by the coalition led by the Croatian Democratic Union, a three-way tie between the coalition led by the Homeland Movement, Bandić Milan 365 - Labour and Solidarity Party and the Social Democratic Party, and, finally, by the Bridge of Independent Lists.

The following table contains the names of the Assembly members elected from each party list. If the Members-elect refuses to take up their seat in the Assembly, or are legally prevented from doing so (e.g. because they are elected to an incompatible political office, such as mayor or deputy mayor), then the candidate who is next on the list will take office as a member of the Assembly. In this context, mayor Tomislav Tomašević, as well as his two deputies, Danijela Dolenec and Luka Korlaet, were ineligible to take up their seats in the Assembly, and were replaced by Marija Krnić, Sanja Bilas and Ana Profeta, respectively.

The Law on Local Elections permits a member of the Zagreb Assembly to simultaneously serve as a Member of the Croatian Parliament. Thus, at least seven Assembly members are currently due to hold office in both bodies during their term: Damir Bakić (We Can!), Stephen N. Bartulica (Homeland Movement), Ivana Kekin (New Left), Vilim Matula (We Can!), Urša Raukar-Gamulin (We Can!), Miroslav Škoro (Homeland Movement) and Zvonimir Troskot (Bridge of Independent Lists). Meanwhile, Rada Borić (New Left) will resign as an MP and serve only in the City Assembly. Furthermore, Tomislav Tomašević will also have to resign from Parliament before assuming office as mayor. Tomašević's parliamentary seat will be filled by Urša Raukar-Gamulin (We Can!), while Borić will be replaced by Ivana Kekin (New Left).

Due to the failure to represent the representatives of the Serbian national minority in the council, by-elections were announced for October 3, 2021 for the election of one representative of the minority. This will increase the number of representatives in the council to 48. The seat was won by Nikola Vukobratović of SDSS who run unopposed.

4: BM365	7: DP - ZL	10: HDZ - HSLS - HSU	13: MOST	14: M! - ZJN! - NLj - ZA-ORAH - ZG	19: SDP
1 – Jelena Pavičić Vukičević; 2 – Ivica Lovrić; 3 – Otto Barić; 4 – Ljubo Jurčić; 5 – Višnja Fortuna	1 – Miroslav Škoro; 2 – Zlatko Hasanbegović; 3 – Nenad Matić; 4 – Stephen Nikola Bartulica; 5 – Slaven Dobrović	1 – Mislav Herman; 2 – Davor Filipović; 3 – Iva Hraste-Sočo; 4 – Mario Župan; 5 – Darko Klasić; 6 – Frane Barbarić	1 – Zvonimir Troskot; 2 – Marko Sladoljev; 3 – Trpimir Goluža	1 – Rada Borić; 2 – Zorislav-Antun Petrović; 3 – Ivana Kekin; 4 – Urša Raukar-Gamulin; 5 – Teodor Celakoski; 6 – Marijana Sumpor; 7 – Damir Bakić; 8 – Iva Ivšić; 9 – Marina Ivandić; 10 – Vilim Matula; 11 – Mauro Sirotnjak; 12 – Marta Kiš; 13 – Svibor Jančić; 14 – Marijana Rimanić; 15 – Robert Faber; 16 – Tihomir Milovac; 17 – Jelena Miloš; 18 – Marija Brajdić Vuković; 19 – Daniela Širinić; 20 – Tomislav Domes; 21 – Marija Krnić; 22 – Sanja Bilas; 23 – Ana Profeta	1 – Joško Klisović; 2 – Dina Vasić; 3 – Renato Petek; 4 – Ivan Račan; 5 – Davorka Moslavac Forjan

=== Councils of the city districts ===
During the local elections voters also had the chance to elect their representatives in the councils of each of Zagreb's 17 city districts.

Distribution of seats per district
District	Možemo!-ZJN-NL-ORaH-ZG	HDZ-HSLS-HSU	SDP	BM 365	DP-ZL	Most	Škare Ožbolt's list	Others	Total seats
Donji Grad	10	2	1	–	1	–	1	–	15
Gornji Grad – Medveščak	8	2	2	–	1	1	1		15
Trnje	8	2	2	1	1	1	–	–	15
Maksimir	8	2	1	–	2	1	1	–	15
Peščenica – Žitnjak	8	3	2	2	2	1	1	–	19
Novi Zagreb – istok	11	2	2	1	2	–	1	–	19
Novi Zagreb – zapad	8	3	2	2	2	1	1	–	19
Trešnjevka – sjever	12	2	2	1	1	1	–	–	19
Trešnjevka – jug	11	3	3	–	1	1	–	–	19
Črnomerec	9	2	1	1	1	1	–	–	15
Gornja Dubrava	7	3	1	3	3	1	1	–	19
Donja Dubrava	5	2	1	2	2	1	1	1^{*}	15
Stenjevec	10	2	2	–	2	3	–	–	19
Podsused – Vrapče	8	2	2	1	1	1	–	–	15
Podsljeme	4	2	–	1	1	–	–	3^{**}	11
Sesvete	5	3	1	4	2	3	1	–	19
Brezovica	2	1	2	3	1	–	1	1^{***}	11
Totals	134	38	27	22	26	17	10	5	279

* Antun Bošnjaković's list
** Krešimir Kompesak's list
*** Youth for Brezovica

== Opinion polls ==
Some of the polls have attracted controversy due to being commissioned by certain candidates. The first Ipsos poll which showed Pavičić Vukičević entering the second round was commissioned by the acting mayor herself. Akter Public was accused by several candidates of attempting to influence voters to vote for Miroslav Škoro in an illegal phone campaign. Two candidates filed charges against the agency. The phone number from which the illegal campaign was carried out was registered to Akter Public, according to the Croatian Regulatory Authority for Network Industries. Akter Public denied using this number. Miroslav Škoro's Homeland Movement admitted hiring the agency for purposes of media buying. Akter Public's polls showed Škoro reaching the second round of the mayoral elections.

=== Mayoral election ===
==== First round ====
Polling Firm	Fieldwork date	Sample size	Tomislav Tomašević	Davor Filipović	Joško Klisović	Miroslav Škoro	Vesna Škare-Ožbolt	Jelena Pavičić Vukičević	Zvonimir Troskot	Anka Mrak-Taritaš	Davor Nađi	Marina Pavković	Željko Uhlir	Mirando Mrsić	Renato Petek	Otto Barić Jr.	Others	Undecided	Lead
**Election results**	**16 May**	—	45.15	**9.83**	**7.82**	**12.16**	**5.10**	**11.10**	**4.12**	**0.83**	**1.98**	-	-	-	-	-	-	-	**32.99**
Average (different polling companies 2 weeks before the election)			38.04	11.26	8.74	10.74	7.26	11.36	3.60	1.82	1.58	-	-	-	-	-	-	-	25.62
2x1 komunikacije	13 May	891	38.8	8.8	6.0	11.9	6.3	14.3	3.1	1.0	1.2	-	-	-	-	-	0.6	8.0	24.5
Promocija plus	11−12 May	800	36.0	12.7	11.9	11.1	8.1	8.2	3.1	2.2	1.4	-	-	-	-	-	0.3	5.0	23.3
MASMI	6−12 May	800	38.1	12.1	8.1	10.5	6.8	8.6	4.9	1.5	1.8	-	-	-	-	-	0.8	-	26.0
HR Rejting	4−6 May	800	35.8	11.6	11.0	8.8	8.5	8.2	2.3	2.1	1.5	-	-	-	-	-	0.2	10.1	24.2
IPSOS	5−6 May	700	41.5	11.1	6.7	11.4	6.6	8.9	4.7	2.3	2.0	-	-	-	-	-	0.2	4.7	30.1
2x1 komunikacije	6 May	880	32.2	8.4	7.6	10.5	6.3	15.2	3.5	3.4	2.2	-	-	-	-	-	1.3	9.6	17.0
Akter public (Note: Akter Public is involved in a controversy with Miroslav Škoro)	30 April – 4 May	1,340	30.7	7.9	10.2	15.5	5.1	9.1	2.5	4.9	-	-	-	-	-	-	-	-	15.2
2x1 komunikacije	25 April	880	33.4	8.0	8.4	9.9	7.6	13.9	3.1	2.3	1.8	-	-	-	-	-	1.6	10.1	19.5
Promocija plus	16−19 April	600	34.6	10.3	10.1	8.0	5.9	7.8	2.5	2.9	2.1	1.0	0.4	-	-	-	1.5	12.9	24.3
Akter public	23 March – 13 April	2,750	31.1	5.7	11.2	14.8	6.3	7.4	4.1	4.8	-	-	-	-	-	-	0.8	13.8	16.3
Ipsos (Note: This survey was commissioned by Jelena Pavičić Vukičević)	14–16 April	800	39.6	7.6	6.5	9.6	5.7	16.6	5.0	3.0	3.7	-	-	0.3	-	-	0.2	2.2	23.0
MASMI	8–12 April	800	37.2	13.4	7.6	7.7	10.1	6.5	4.8	3.2	1.6	-	-	-	-	-		6.4	23.8
MASMI	11–16 March	800	37.6	10.7	11.7	8.3	10.2	4.3	5.8	-	1.2	0.5	0.3	1.4	1.1	-	-	6.9	25.9
2x1 komunikacije	15–16 March	510	37.3	8.2	8.6	7.7	7.8	8.8	2.2	1.6	2.2	-	-	-	-	-	3.7	12.0	28.5
Promocija plus	8–9 March	600	39.7	8.6	12.2	7.5	7.9	6.4	2.1	-	3.2	0.6	0.6	0.9	-	-	0.6	9.8	27.5
IPSOS	2–3 March	600	38.0	11.7	15.8	6.3	9.6	4.9	6.5	-	1.2	0.9	0.0	0.4	0.3	0.9	0.4	3.1	22.2

==== Second round ====
Polling Firm	Fieldwork date	Sample size	Tomislav Tomašević	Joško Klisović	Davor Filipović	Miroslav Škoro	Jelena Pavičić Vukičević	Vesna Škare-Ožbolt	Undecided	Will not vote	Lead
Promocija plus	21−22 May 2021	800	62.9	–	–	20.5	–	–	13.2	3.4	42.4
IPSOS	16−17 May 2021	4,000	60.4	–	–	21.7	–	–	17.9	–	38.7
Promocija plus	11−12 May 2021	800	51.0	22.7	–	–	–	–	11.2	15.1	28.3
Promocija plus	11−12 May 2021	800	59.8	–	23.5	–	–	–	5.7	11.0	36.3
Promocija plus	11−12 May 2021	800	62.0	–	–	19.4	–	–	7.8	10.9	42.6
Promocija plus	11−12 May 2021	800	57.2	–	–	–	23.2	-	9.9	9.7	34
MASMI	6–12 May 2021	800	58	–	26	–	–	–	7.7	8.3	32
MASMI	6–12 May 2021	800	57.5	–	–	29.1	–	–	6.2	7.1	28.4
MASMI	6–12 May 2021	800	60.6	–	–	–	21.2	–	–	–	39.4
HR Rejting	4−6 May 2021	800	52.6	22.1	–	–	–	–	10.3	15.0	30.5
HR Rejting	4−6 May 2021	800	60.5	–	23.3	–	–	–	6.7	9.6	37.2
HR Rejting	4−6 May 2021	800	64.7	–	–	19.5	–	–	6.9	8.9	45.2
HR Rejting	4−6 May 2021	800	58.7	–	–	–	24.8	–	6.6	9.9	33.9
HR Rejting	4−6 May 2021	800	55.3	–	–	–	–	29.9	6.6	8.1	25.4
IPSOS	5−6 May 2021	700	59.9	18.9	–	–	–	–	6.6	14.0	41.0
IPSOS	5−6 May 2021	700	59.5	–	26.6	–	–	–	4.8	8.6	32.9
IPSOS	5−6 May 2021	700	62.7	–	–	25.2	–	–	3.9	7.8	37.5
IPSOS	5−6 May 2021	700	60.2	–	–	–	25.9	–	4.0	9.1	34.3
IPSOS	5−6 May 2021	700	56.7	–	–	–	–	29.7	3.1	10.0	27.0
Promocija plus	16−19 April 2021	600	52.5	21.1	–	–	–	–	26.4	−	31.4
Promocija plus	16−19 April 2021	600	61.8	–	21.3	–	–	–	16.9	–	40.5
Promocija plus	16−19 April 2021	600	64.8	–	–	18.4	–	–	16.8	−	46.4
Promocija plus	16−19 April 2021	600	59.1	–	–	−	23.3	–	17.6	−	35.8
Promocija plus	16−19 April 2021	600	57.0	–	–	−	–	26.5	16.5	−	30.5
MASMI	11−16 March 2021	800	49.4	13.3	–	–	–	–	14.1	23.2	36.1
MASMI	11−16 March 2021	800	56.3	–	19.0	–	–	–	10.0	14.7	37.3
MASMI	11−16 March 2021	800	57.6	–	–	16.0	–	–	9.2	17.2	41.6
IPSOS	2−3 March 2021	600	53.5	22.5	–	–	–	–	24.0	–	31.0
IPSOS	2−3 March 2021	600	64.2	–	24.2	–	–	–	11.6	–	40.0

=== Zagreb Assembly ===
==== Graphical summary ====
Bold: electoral lists which would be eligible to receive seats

Polling Firm	Fieldwork date	Sample size	Možemo	HDZ	SDP	DP	Škare-Ožbolt's List	BM 365	Most	Others	Undecided	Lead
**Election results**	**16 May**	—	40.83	11.30	8.88	10.59	**4.44**	**9.04**	**6.20**	**8.72**	–	**29.53**
Vote average			32.51	14.83	11.89	8.2	**6.07**	**6.27**	4.57	–	–	17.68
Seat average (D'Hondt method)			20	9	7	5	**3**	**3**	0	–	–	11
Promocija plus	11−12 May 2021	800	33	15.2	14.3	8.1	**5.0**	**6.1**	4.4	4.8	9.1	17.8
MASMI	6−12 May 2021	800	33.5	16.9	9.8	9.9	**5.5**	**6**	4.8	–	–	16.6
HR Rejting	4−6 May 2021	800	30.3	14.9	14.5	7.9	**5.6**	**5.3**	3.8	3.2	13.0	15.4
IPSOS	5−6 May 2021	700	36.6	9.0	6.4	10.0	**5.7**	**8.9**	3.7	7.5	12.2	26.6
Promocija plus	16−19 April 2021	600	28.7	13.4	13.0	7.1	3.8	**5.4**	3.6	8.7	16.3	15.3
MASMI	8–12 April 2021	800	29.3	19.7	11.4	8.0	**9.6**	4.6	**5.8**	–	–	9.6
IPSOS	2–3 March 2021	600	36.2	14.7	13.8	6.4	**7.3**	**7.6**	**5.9**	2.9	5.0	21.5

== See also ==
- List of mayors in Croatia
- List of mayors of Zagreb
- 2021 Split local elections
- 2021 Rijeka local elections
- 2021 Osijek local elections
