= Electoral district VII (Croatian Parliament) =

- Constituency for the Croatian Parliament
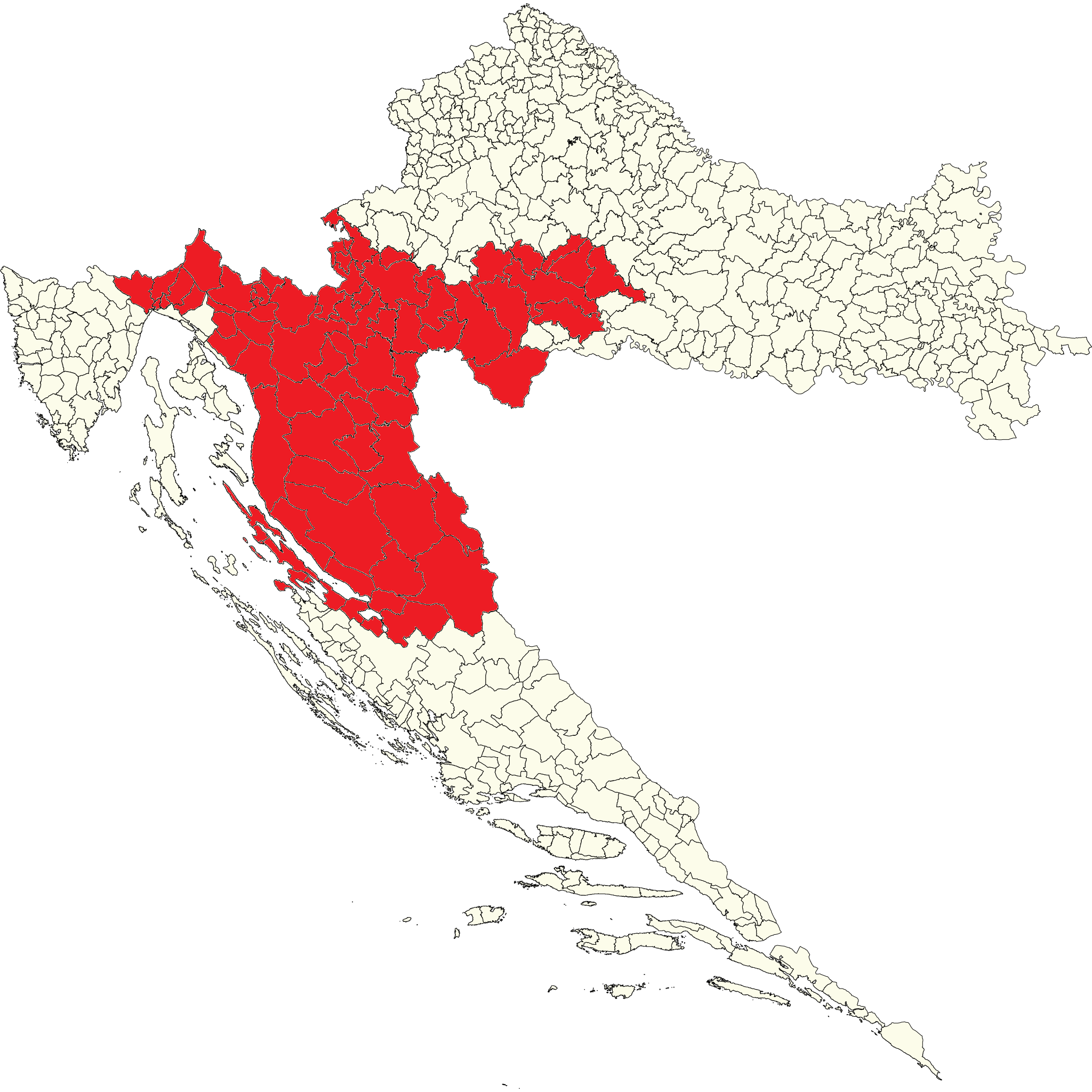
- Map of Electoral district VII (2023-present)
- Electorate: 353,430 (2025)
- Major settlements: Zadar, Karlovac, Ogulin, Sisak, Petrinja, Kutina, Gospić

Current constituency
- Created: 2023
- Number of members: 14

Electoral district VII (Croatian: VII. izborna jedinica) is one of twelve electoral districts of the Croatian Parliament. In 2025, the district had 353,430 registered voters.

== Boundaries ==
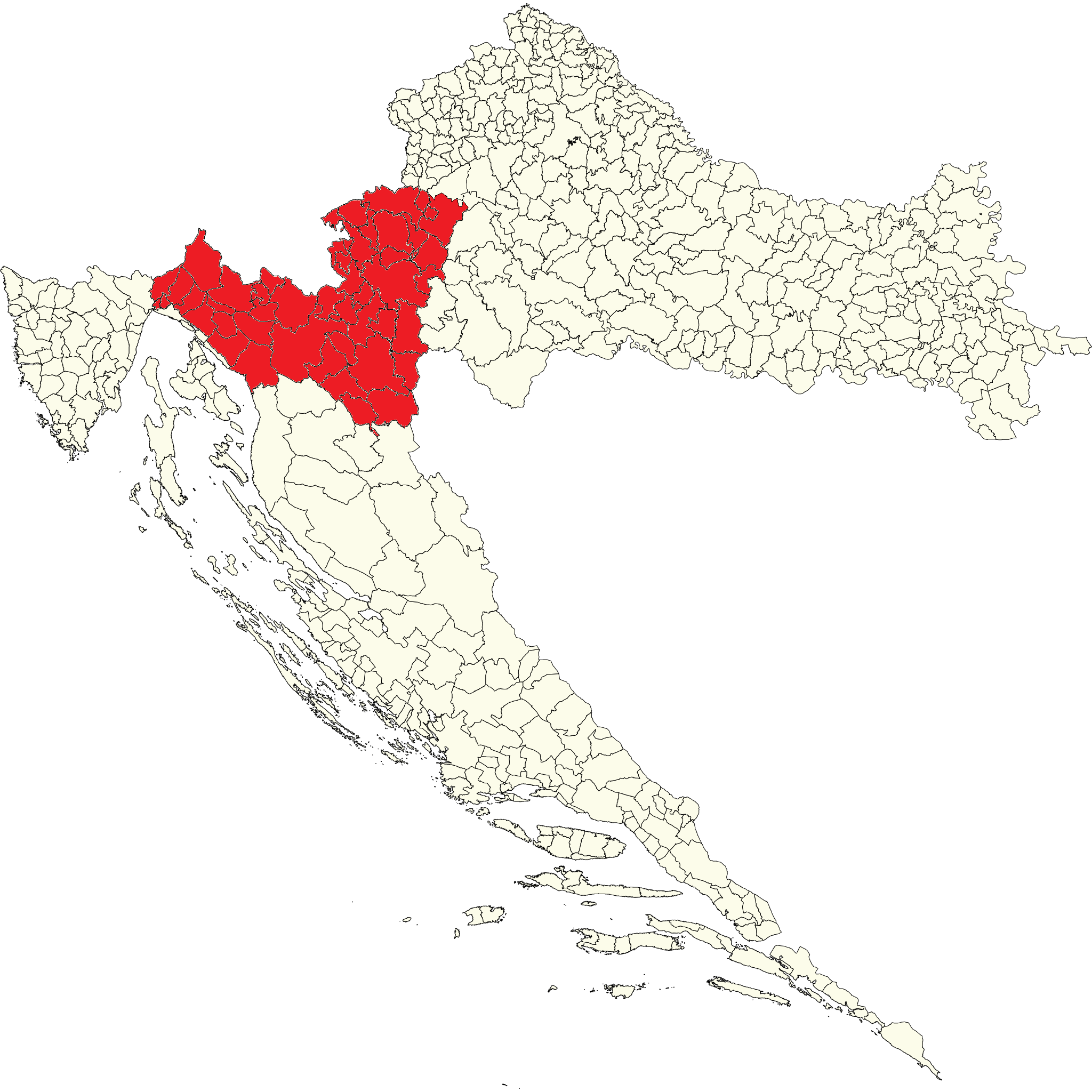
Electoral district VII (1999–2023)

=== Creation ===
From 1999 to 2023, electoral district VII consisted of:

- The southwestern part of Zagreb County including the cities and municipalities: Jastrebarsko, Klinča Sela, Krašić, Pisarovina, Samobor, Stupnik, Sveta Nedelja, Žumberak;
- The whole Karlovac County;
- The eastern part of Primorje-Gorski Kotar County including the cities and municipalities: Bakar, Brod Moravice, Čabar, Čavle, Delnice, Fužine, Jelenje, Kastav, Klana, Lokve, Mrkopalj, Novi Vinodolski, Ravna Gora, Skrad, Vinodol, Viškovo, Vrbovsko;
- The western, southwestern and southern part of City of Zagreb including the city districts and streets: Gajnice, Stenjevec, Malešnica, Špansko, Prečko, Vrbani, Jarun, Gajevo, Trnsko-Krešimir Rakić, Kajzerica, Savski Gaj, Remetinec, Blato, Jakuševac, Hrelić, Sveta Klara, Botinec, Brebernica, Brezovica, Buzin, Demerje, Desprim, Donji Čehi, Donji Dragonožec, Donji Trpuci, Drežnik Brezovički, Goli Breg, Gornji Čehi, Gornji Dragonožec, Gornji Trpuci, Grančari, Havidić Selo, Horvati, Hrašće Turopoljsko, Hrvatski Leskovac, Hudi Bitek, Ježdovec, Kupinečki Kraljevec, Lipnica, Lučko, Mala Mlaka, Odra, Odranski Obrež, Starjak, Strmec, Veliko Polje, Zadvorsko.

=== 2023 revision ===
Under the 2023 revision, district boundaries were redrawn according to the suggestion of the Constitutional Court to compel a proportional number of voters.

The new district consists of:

- The whole Lika-Senj County
- The whole Karlovac County
- The central, southern and western part of Sisak-Moslavina County:
  - cities and municipalities: Glina, Kutina, Petrinja, Popovača, Sisak, Dvor, Gvozd, Lekenik, Martinska Ves, Sunja, Topusko and Velika Ludina
- The northern part of Zadar County:
  - cities and municipalities: Obrovac, Pag, Gračac, Jasenice, Kolan, Novigrad, Posedarje, Povljana, Ražanac, Starigrad and Vir
- The northern and eastern part of Primorje-Gorski Kotar County:
  - cities and municipalities: Čabar, Delnice, Kastav, Vrbovsko, Brod Moravice, Čavle, Fužine, Jelenje, Klana, Lokve, Matulji, Mrkopalj, Ravna Gora, Skrad, Vinodol and Viškovo

== Representatives ==
The current representatives of the seventh electoral district in the Croatian Parliament are:

| Name | Party | Deputizing |
|---|---|---|
| Majda Burić | HDZ | Tomo Medved |
| Ivan Dabo | HDZ | Ernest Petry |
| Magdalena Komes | HDZ | Ivan Celjak |
| Damir Mandić | HDZ | Martina Furdek-Hajdin |
| Anđelka Salopek | HDZ | Nikolina Brnjac |
| Dalibor Domitrović | SDP | |
| Kristina Ikić Baniček | SDP | |
| Sandra Krpan | SDP | |
| Matej Mostarac | SDP | Ivica Lukanović |
| Josip Jurčević | Independent | |
| Marijana Petir | Independent | |
| Zvonimir Troskot | Most | |
| Draženka Polović | Možemo! | |
| Veselko Gabričević | HSU | |

== Elections ==
=== 2000 Elections ===
| Party | Votes | % | Seats |
|---|---|---|---|
| SDP - HSLS | 126.017 | 43.95 | 7 |
| HDZ | 71.816 | 25.05 | 4 |
| HSS - LS - HNS - IDS | 35.460 | 12.37 | 2 |
| HSP - HKDU | 16.702 | 5.83 | 1 |
| others | 36.709 | 12.8 | 0 |
| Total | 286.704 | 100 | 14 |
| Valid votes | 286.704 | 98.29 | |
| Invalid/blank votes | 4.980 | 1.71 | |
| Total votes | 291.684 | 78.32 | |
| Registered voters/turnout | 372.446 | | |
Source: Results Archived 2022-11-27 at the Wayback Machine

SDP - HSLS

- Željka Antunović
- Ivo Škrabalo
- Mato Crkvenac
- Milanka Opačić
- Zrinjka Glovacki-Bernardi
- Zdenko Franić
- Ivan Štajduhar

HDZ

- Vlatko Pavletić
- Pavao Miljavac
- Ivan Penić
- Dario Vukić

HSS - LS - HNS - ASH

- Radimir Čačić
- Božidar Pankretić

HSP - HKDU

- Tonči Tadić

=== 2003 Elections ===
| Party | Votes | % | Seats | +/- |
|---|---|---|---|---|
| HDZ | 84.943 | 32.98 | 7 | +3 |
| SDP | 60.107 | 23.34 | 4 | -3 |
| HSP | 20.570 | 7.99 | 1 | 0 |
| HNS - PGS | 20.003 | 7.77 | 1 | 0 |
| HSS | 18.340 | 7.12 | 1 | 0 |
| others | 53.576 | 20.80 | 0 | 0 |
| Total | 257.539 | 100 | 14 | 0 |
| Valid votes | 257.539 | 97.76 | | |
| Invalid/blank votes | 5.898 | 2.24 | | |
| Total votes | 263.437 | 68.95 | | |
| Registered voters/turnout | 382.084 | | | |
Source: Results Archived 2022-11-27 at the Wayback Machine

HDZ

- Miomir Žužul
- Branko Vukelić
- Branimir Pasecky
- Kolinda Grabar-Kitarović
- Ivan Vučić
- Neven Jurica
- Krunoslav Markovinović

SDP

- Mato Crkvenac
- Milanka Opačić
- Vesna Škulić
- Nenad Stazić

HSP

- Miroslav Rožić

HNS - PGS

- Darko Šantić

HSS

- Božidar Pankretić

=== 2007 Elections ===
| Party | Votes | % | Seats | +/- |
|---|---|---|---|---|
| SDP | 95.959 | 36.90 | 6 | +2 |
| HDZ | 91.387 | 35.14 | 6 | -1 |
| HSS - HSLS - PGS | 16.874 | 6.49 | 1 | 0 |
| HNS | 14.355 | 5.52 | 1 | 0 |
| others | 41.475 | 15.95 | 0 | -1 |
| Total | 260.050 | 100 | 14 | 0 |
| Valid votes | 260.050 | 98.42 | | |
| Invalid/blank votes | 4.182 | 1.58 | | |
| Total votes | 264.232 | 65.43 | | |
| Registered voters/turnout | 403.812 | | | |
Source: Results Archived 2022-11-27 at the Wayback Machine

SDP

- Milanka Opačić
- Josip Leko
- Nenad Stazić
- Ivo Jelušić
- Biserka Vranić
- Zdenko Franić

HDZ

- Marina Matulović-Dropulić
- Branko Vukelić
- Mario Zubović
- Ivan Vučić
- Anton Mance
- Krunoslav Markovinović

HSS - HSLS - PGS

- Božidar Pankretić

HNS

- Miljenko Dorić

=== 2011 Elections ===
| Party | Votes | % | Seats | +/- |
|---|---|---|---|---|
| SDP - HNS - IDS - HSU | 110.540 | 42.28 | 9 | +2 |
| HDZ | 57.196 | 21.88 | 4 | -2 |
| HL SR | 16.315 | 6.24 | 1 | +1 |
| others | 77.372 | 29.60 | 0 | -1 |
| Total | 261.423 | 100 | 14 | 0 |
| Valid votes | 261.423 | 98.15 | | |
| Invalid/blank votes | 4.929 | 1.85 | | |
| Total votes | 266.352 | 64.47 | | |
| Registered voters/turnout | 413.148 | | | |
Source: Results

SDP - HNS - IDS - HSU

- Milanka Opačić
- Josip Leko
- Slavko Linić
- Nenad Stazić
- Mirando Mrsić
- Mihael Zmajlović
- Luka Denona
- Ivo Jelušić
- Damir Mateljan

HDZ

- Martina Dalić
- Davor Ivo Stier
- Branko Vukelić
- Andrej Plenković

HL SR

- Nikola Vuljanić

=== 2015 Elections ===
| Party | Votes | % | Seats | +/- |
|---|---|---|---|---|
| SDP - HNS - HSU - HL SR - A-HSS - ZS | 88.102 | 34.71 | 6 | -2 |
| HDZ - HSS - HSP AS - BUZ - HSLS - HRAST - HDS - ZDS | 81.092 | 31.95 | 5 | +1 |
| Most | 39.854 | 15.70 | 2 | +2 |
| ŽZ | 14.690 | 5.79 | 1 | +1 |
| BM365 - DPS - DSŽ - HES - HRS - HSZ - ID - MS - NSH - Novi val - SU - UDU - Zeleni - ZS | 13.485 | 5.31 | 0 | 0 |
| others | 16.590 | 6.54 | 0 | 0 |
| Total | 253.813 | 100 | 14 | 0 |
| Valid votes | 253.813 | 98.32 | | |
| Invalid/blank votes | 4.337 | 1.68 | | |
| Total votes | 258.150 | 65.85 | | |
| Registered voters/turnout | 392.016 | | | |
Source: Results Archived 2022-11-27 at the Wayback Machine

SDP - HNS - HSU - HL SR - A-HSS - ZS

- Milanka Opačić
- Nenad Stazić
- Mihael Zmajlović
- Nada Turina-Đurić
- Tomislav Saucha
- Damir Mateljan

HDZ - HSS - HSP AS - BUZ - HSLS - HRAST - HDS - ZDS

- Damir Jelić
- Domagoj Ivan Milošević
- Željko Dilber
- Jasen Mesić
- Željko Fiolić

Most

- Slaven Dobrović
- Josip Katalinić

ŽZ

- Ivan Sinčić

=== 2016 Elections ===
| Party | Votes | % | Seats | +/- |
|---|---|---|---|---|
| SDP - HNS - HSS - HSU | 76.786 | 35.48 | 6 | 0 |
| HDZ | 76.049 | 35.14 | 6 | +1 |
| Most | 19.723 | 9.11 | 1 | -1 |
| ŽZ - PH - AM - Abeceda | 18.418 | 8.51 | 1 | 0 |
| others | 25.416 | 11.76 | 0 | 0 |
| Total | 216.392 | 100 | 14 | 0 |
| Valid votes | 216.392 | 98.13 | | |
| Invalid/blank votes | 4.131 | 1.87 | | |
| Total votes | 220.523 | 56.61 | | |
| Registered voters/turnout | 389.534 | | | |
Source: Results Archived 2022-11-27 at the Wayback Machine

SDP - HNS - HSS - HSU

- Milanka Opačić
- Krešo Beljak
- Mihael Zmajlović
- Tomislav Saucha
- Damir Mateljan
- Saša Đujić

HDZ

- Davor Ivo Stier
- Tomo Medved
- Damir Jelić
- Tomislav Ćorić
- Tomislav Klarić
- Domagoj Ivan Milošević

Most

- Josip Katalinić

ŽZ - PH - AM - Abeceda

- Ivan Vilibor Sinčić

=== 2020 Elections ===
| Party | Votes | % | Seats | +/- |
|---|---|---|---|---|
| HDZ | 68.401 | 35.91 | 6 | 0 |
| SDP - HSS - HSU - SNAGA - GLAS - IDS - PGS | 46.722 | 24.52 | 4 | -2 |
| Možemo - NL - RF - ORAH - ZJN - ZG | 19.949 | 10.47 | 1 | +1 |
| DP - HS - BLOK - HKS - HRAST - SU - ZL | 18.086 | 9.49 | 1 | +1 |
| Most | 12.997 | 6.82 | 1 | 0 |
| SsIP - Pametno - Fokus | 12.228 | 6.41 | 1 | +1 |
| others | 12.088 | 6.38 | 0 | -1 |
| Total | 190.471 | 100 | 14 | 0 |
| Valid votes | 190.471 | 97.82 | | |
| Invalid/blank votes | 4.248 | 2.18 | | |
| Total votes | 194.719 | 47.69 | | |
| Registered voters/turnout | 408.297 | | | |
Source: Results

HDZ

- Tomo Medved
- Tomislav Ćorić
- Nada Murganić
- Davor Ivo Stier
- Tomislav Klarić
- Josip Salapić

SDP - HNS - HSS - HSU

- Zlatko Komadina
- Krešo Beljak
- Sanja Udović
- Zvane Brumnić

Možemo - NL - RF - ORAH - ZJN - ZG

- Rada Borić

DP - HS - BLOK - HKS - HRAST - SU - ZL

- Ante Prkačin

Most

- Zvonimir Troskot

SsIP - Pametno - Fokus

- Dario Zurovec

=== 2024 Elections ===
| Party | Votes | % | Seats | +/- |
|---|---|---|---|---|
| HDZ - HSLS - HDS - HNS - HSU | 80.485 | 41.31 | 7 | +1 |
| SDP - Centre - HSS - DO i SP - GLAS | 49.425 | 25.36 | 4 | 0 |
| Možemo - HP | 13.504 | 6.93 | 1 | 0 |
| DP - PiP - DHSS - ZL | 16.834 | 8.64 | 1 | 0 |
| Most - HS - HKS - NLM | 12.883 | 6.61 | 1 | 0 |
| others | 21.700 | 11.15 | 0 | -1 |
| Total | 194.831 | 100 | 14 | 0 |
| Valid votes | 194.831 | 96.79 | | |
| Invalid/blank votes | 6.452 | 3.21 | | |
| Total votes | 201.283 | 59.04 | | |
| Registered voters/turnout | 340.923 | | | |
| Source: Results | | | | |

HDZ - HSLS - HDS - HNS - HSU

- Tomo Medved
- Ivan Celjak
- Martina Furdek-Hajdin
- Marijana Petir
- Veselko Gabričević
- Nikolina Brnjac

SDP - Centre - HSS - DO i SP - GLAS

- Kristina Ikić Baniček
- Ivica Lukanović
- Sandra Krpan
- Dalibor Domitrović

DP - PiP - DHSS - ZL

- Josip Jurčević

Možemo - HP

- Draženka Polović

Most - HS - HKS - NLM

- Zvonimir Troskot
