= 2017 Zagreb local elections =

Municipal election in Zagreb, Croatia

2017 Zagreb mayoral election
- 4 June 2017
- Turnout: 41.14%
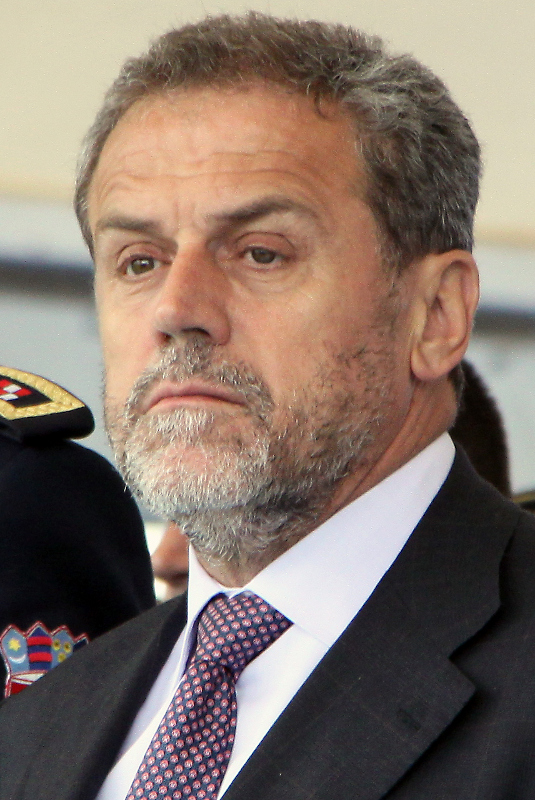

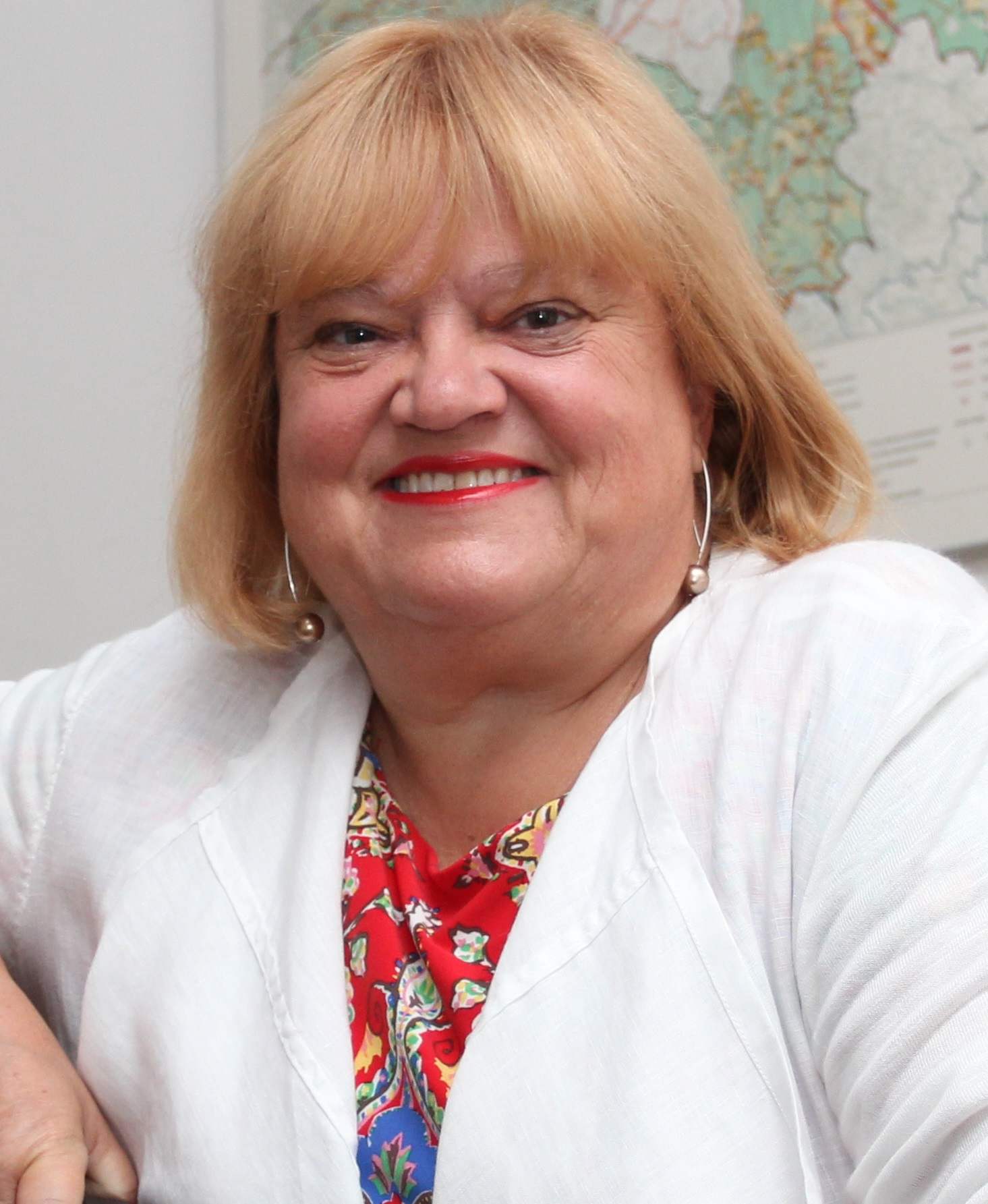
Candidate	Milan Bandić	Anka Mrak Taritaš
Party	BM 365	HNS-LD
Popular vote	147,680	131,373
Percentage	51.79%	46.07%
Mayor before election
Milan Bandić
BM 365
Elected mayor
Milan Bandić
BM 365

Elections were held in Zagreb on 21 May and 4 June 2017 for the Mayor of Zagreb and members of the Zagreb Assembly. Milan Bandić, the 52nd and incumbent mayor since 2005 (previously also the 50th mayor from 2000 to 2002), ran for a sixth 4-year term. As no candidate won an absolute majority of the vote in the first round, a second round of elections took place on 4 June 2017 between the two highest-placed candidates in terms of popular vote: incumbent mayor Milan Bandić of the Bandić Milan 365 - Labour and Solidarity Party and former Minister of Construction Anka Mrak Taritaš of the Croatian People's Party - Liberal Democrats. In the run-off Bandić won re-election as mayor, taking 51.8% of the votes against 46% for Mrak Taritaš (with 2.1% of the votes being blank or invalid). Turnout for the election was 47.7% in the first round and 41.2% in the second round.

As Zagreb, being the national capital, is the only Croatian city to enjoy a special status within Croatia's regional administrative framework (being both a city and a county), the mayor of Zagreb likewise also enjoys a status equal to that of a county prefect (Croatian: župan) of one of Croatia's other 20 counties (Croatian: županija).

This was the third direct election for the mayor of Zagreb (simultaneously held with elections for all other county prefects and mayors in Croatia) since the popular vote method was introduced in 2009, as previously those officials had been elected by their county or city assemblies and councils.

== Results ==
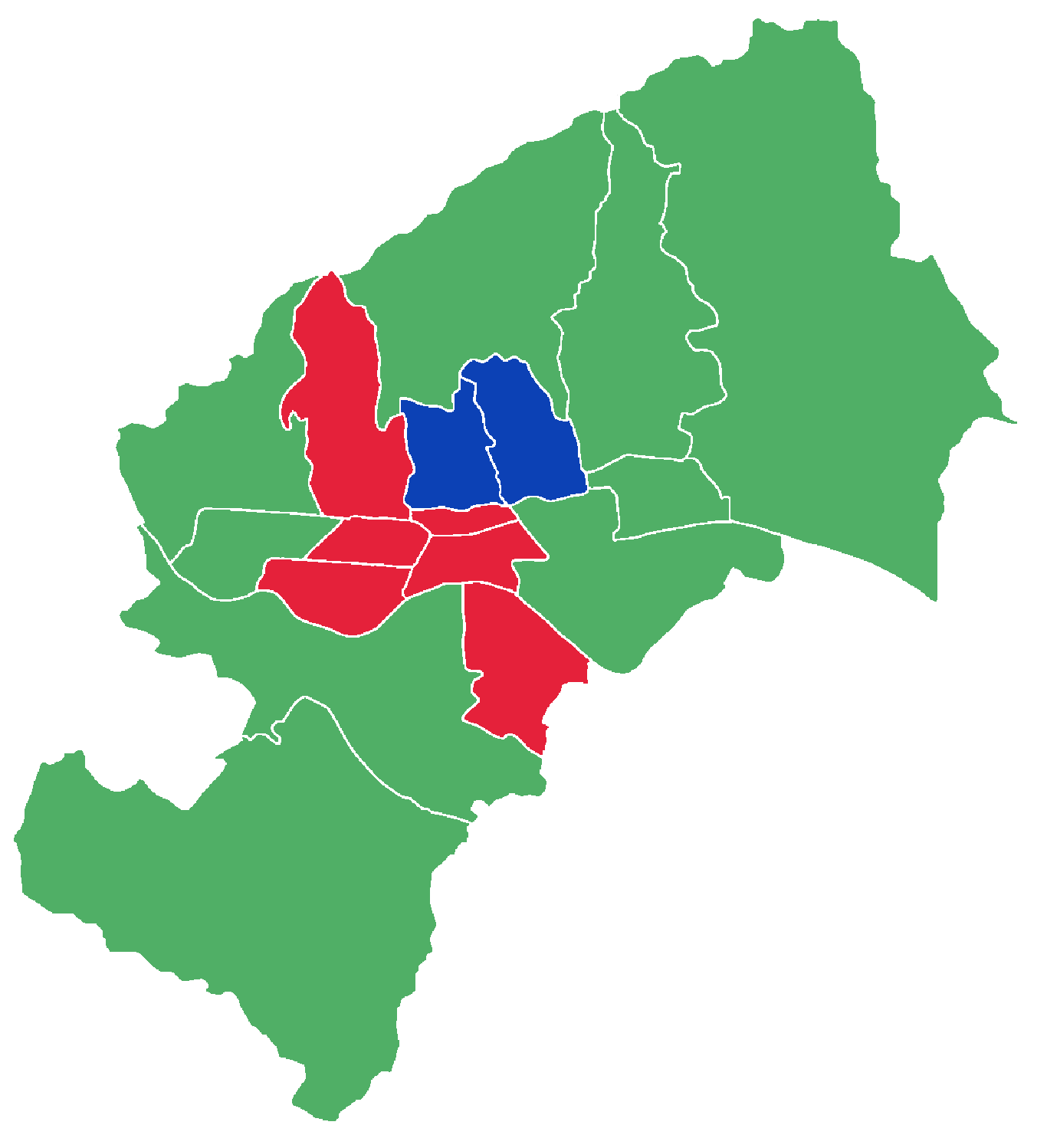
Results of the election for councils of Districts of Zagreb: the party with the majority of votes in each district: Bandić Milan 365 - Labour and Solidarity Party Social Democratic Party of Croatia Croatian Democratic Union

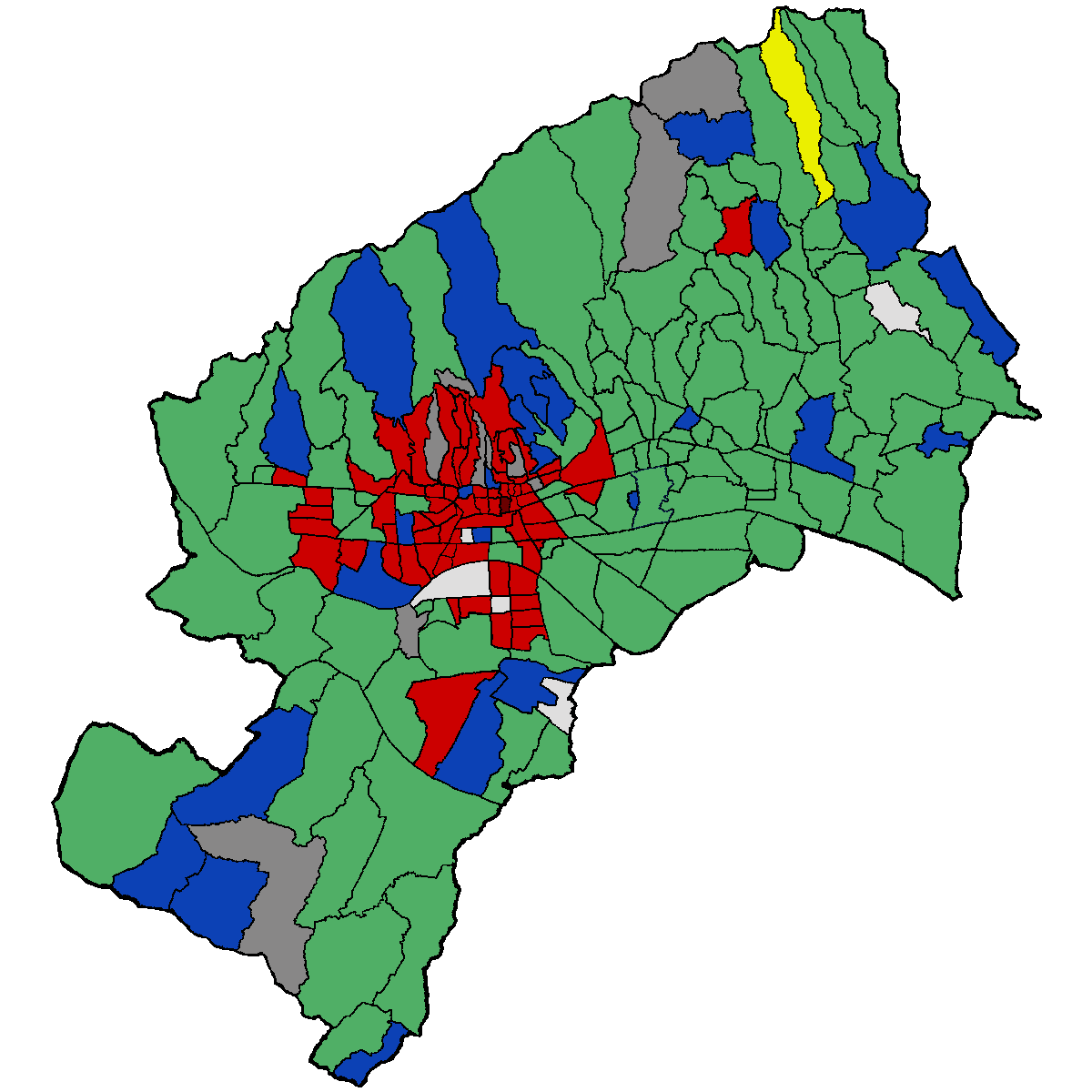
Results of the election for councils of local committees: the party with the majority of votes in each committee: Bandić Milan 365 - Labour and Solidarity Party Social Democratic Party of Croatia Croatian Democratic Union Independent list of Sandra Švaljek Human Shield Zagreb is Ours Independent

=== Mayoral election ===
Candidates		First round		Second round	
Candidate	Party	Votes	%	Votes	%
Milan Bandić	Bandić Milan 365 - Labour and Solidarity Party	101,828	30.87%	147,680	51.79%
Anka Mrak Taritaš	Croatian People's Party – Liberal Democrats	80,765	24.48%	131,373	46.07%
Sandra Švaljek	Independent (supported by HSLS, HKS)	63,131	19.14%		
Bruna Esih	Independent	36,211	10.98%		
Drago Prgomet	Croatian Democratic Union	18,478	5.60%		
Tomislav Tomašević	Zagreb is OURS!	12,996	3.94%		
Ivan Lovrinović	Human Shield	6,595	2.00%		
Marko Sladoljev	Bridge of Independent Lists	6,214	1.88%		

=== Assembly election ===
Party list	Votes	%	Seats	%	Seat change
Bandić Milan 365 - Labour and Solidarity Party; Party of Intergenerational Solidarity of Croatia; Green list People's Party - Reformists	74,467	23.03%	14	27.45%	▲3
Social Democratic Party of Croatia; Croatian People's Party - Liberal Democrats; Croatian Peasant Party; Croatian Party of Pensioners; Forward Croatia-Progressive Alliance; Party of Pensioners; Independent Democratic Serb Party	67,189	20.78%	13	25.49%	▼4
Independent list of Sandra Švaljek; Croatian Social Liberal Party; Green Party; Croatian Conservative Party	40,215	12.43%	8	15.69%	▲4
Croatian Democratic Union	38,684	11.96%	7	13.73%	▼1
Independent list of Bruna Esih	26,628	8.23%	5	9.80%	▲5
Zagreb is OURS! New Left; Sustainable Development of Croatia; Workers' Front; For the City	24,706	7.64%	4	7.84%	▲4
Bridge of Independent Lists	15,966	4.93%	0	0%	0
Human Shield; Let's Change Croatia	14,654	4.53%	0	0%	0
Pametno	5,682	1.75%	0	0%	0
Bloc Pensioners Together	2,908	0.89%	0	0%	▼1
Total:	323,322	98.20%	51		0
Invalid votes:	1,610	1.80%			
Turnout:	329,605	47.62%			
Expected voters:	692,144				
The percentages of votes from each list are calculated from number of valid voters The percentages of valid and invalid votes are calculated from the turnout number The turnout percentage is calculated from the number of expected voters
Source: State Election Committee (Državno izborno povjerenstvo)

=== Councils of districts ===
Distribution of seats per district
District	BM 365	SDP-HNS	HDZ	NLSŠ-HSLS	ZJN	Most	Živi Zid	Others
Donji Grad	2	5	3	2	3			
Gornji Grad – Medveščak	3	3	3	3	2			1
Trnje	3	4	2	3	2			1
Maksimir	3	3	4	2	1	1		1
Peščenica – Žitnjak	9	4	3	2	1			
Novi Zagreb – istok	5	5	3	2	2	1	1	
Novi Zagreb – zapad	7	3	4	3	1		1	
Trešnjevka – sjever	4	4	3	3	3	1	1	
Trešnjevka – jug	4	5	3	3	2	1	1	
Črnomerec	3	3	3	3	2	1		
Gornja Dubrava	8	3	4	3		1		
Donja Dubrava	7	2	3	2		1		
Stenjevec	4	4	4	3	1	2	1	
Podsused – Vrapče	5	3	2	2	1	1	1	
Podsljeme	4	1	2	1				3
Sesvete	8	3	4	2		1	1	
Brezovica	5	1	3	1				1
Totals	84	56	53	40	21	11	7	7

=== Councils of local committees ===
Distribution of seats per district
District	BM 365	SDP-HNS	HDZ	NLSŠ-HSLS	ZJN	Most	Živi Zid	Others
Donji Grad	14	31	14	7	7		2	
Gornji Grad – Medveščak	10	24	15	15	3			2
Trnje	16	25	13	12	6		1	4
Maksimir	16	19	19	7	5	3		4
Peščenica – Žitnjak	44	19	18	9	3			3
Novi Zagreb – istok	18	21	15	11	2		5	5
Novi Zagreb – zapad	35	21	21	12	4		1	9
Trešnjevka – sjever	15	20	14	10	10		1	2
Trešnjevka – jug	13	15	12	10	4		2	2
Črnomerec	13	15	12	15	2		1	
Gornja Dubrava	44	16	21	13	1		2	2
Donja Dubrava	27	8	11	6		1		1
Stenjevec	13	13	9	7		3	3	4
Podsused – Vrapče	18	11	10	9		2	3	2
Podsljeme	10	3	6	5				7
Sesvete	120	36	50	17		2	9	14
Brezovica	27	7	17	7		1		3
Totals	453	304	273	172	47	12	30	64

== Opinion polls ==
Poll results are listed in the tables below in reverse chronological order, showing the most recent first, and using the date the survey's fieldwork was done, as opposed to the date of publication. If such date is unknown, the date of publication is given instead. The highest percentage figure in each polling survey is displayed in bold, and the background shaded in the leading party's color. In the instance that there is a tie, then no figure is shaded. The lead column on the right shows the percentage-point difference between the two parties with the highest figures. When a specific poll does not show a data figure for a party, the party's cell corresponding to that poll is shown as not announced (N/A).

=== First round ===
==== 2017 ====
Date(s) conducted	Polling Organisation	Sample size	Milan Bandić	Sandra Švaljek	Anka Mrak Taritaš	Bruna Esih	Drago Prgomet	Ivan Lovrinović	Marko Sladoljev	Others	Undecided
**21 May**	**Election results**	/	**30.87%**	**19.14%**	**24.48%**	**10.98%**	**5.60%**	**2.0%**	**1.88%**	/	/
May	Promocija plus	800	**25.3%**	16.7%	24.1%	10.7%	7.7%	2.2%	1.8%	N/A	N/A
12–16 May	Ipsos Puls	1,002	**24.9%**	16.7%	24.7%	8.3%	5.8%	4.3%	2.9%	2.1%	10.3%
24–26 March	Ipsos Puls	600	24.1%	21.2%	**27.8%**	9.3%	6.8%	-	1.1%	2.9%	6.8%
March	Promocija plus	800	**29.1%**	19.8%	25.6%	8.8%	4.9%	-	1.1%	3.4%	7.5%
18 March	2x1 komunikacije	700	**32.3%**	15.2%	21.8%	8.6%	5.0%	-	2.8%	-	-
21–24 February	Promocija plus	1,000	**28.1%**	24.0%	26.7%	5.1%	-	-	-	15.2%	-

==== 2014–2016 ====
Date(s) conducted	Polling Organisation	Sample size	Milan Bandić	Sandra Švaljek	Anka Mrak Taritaš	Davor Bernardić	Andrija Mikulić	Others	Undecided
12–18 November	Promocija plus	1,000	31.3%	25.2%	18.1%	9.0%	-	10.7%	-
24–28 October	Promocija plus	1,000	29.0%	21.7%	15.4%	7.1%	-	15.5%	11.5%
May	Promocija plus	1,000	29.1%	26.7%	6.8%	6.6%	5.4%	13.9%	11.5%
14–22 April	Promocija plus	1,000	33.8%	28.6%	9.3%	8.5%	4.9%	1.1%	13.8%
**2016**
April	2x1 komunikacije	1,041	32.6%	8.9%	3.7%	17.2%	17.0%	4.8%	15.9%
2–9 March	2x1 komunikacije	3,000	34.9%	10.8%	5.3%	16.3%	19.9%	5.3%	7.5%
13–17 February	2x1 komunikacije	3,000	34.6%	-	2.5%	19.9%	11.0%	10.9%	21.1%
19–22 January	2x1 komunikacije	3,000	34.3%	5.8%	-	8.6%	9.7%	20.7%	20.8%
**2015**
12 April	Vectura	500	40.6%	-	1.2%	18.7%	6.2%	24.9%	8.3%
**2014**

=== Second round ===
==== Bandić–Švaljek ====
Date(s) conducted	Polling Organisation	Sample size	Milan Bandić	Sandra Švaljek
May 2017	Promocija plus	800	37.3%	**46.3%**
12–16 May 2017	Ipsos Puls	1002	39.9%	**50.7%**
24–26 March 2017	Ipsos Puls	600	36.9%	**55%**
March 2017	Promocija plus	800	**44.9%**	42.9%
24–28 October 2016	Promocija plus	1,000	**50.9%**	49.1%

==== Bandić–Mrak Taritaš ====
Date(s) conducted	Polling Organisation	Sample size	Milan Bandić	Anka Mrak Taritaš
30 May–1 June 2017	Ipsos Puls	925	**48.4%**	40.7%
May 2017	Promocija plus	800	**45.3%**	43.2%
21 May 2017	Ipsos Puls	5,224	**43.6%**	43.3%
May 2017	Promocija plus	800	**41.2%**	40.5%
12–16 May 2017	Ipsos Puls	1,002	**44.8%**	44.3%
24–26 March 2017	Ipsos Puls	600	43%	**47,9%**
March 2017	Promocija plus	800	**42.4%**	41.4%
21–24 February 2017	Promocija plus	1,000	47.6%	**52.4%**
24–28 October 2016	Promocija plus	1,000	**52.9%**	47.1%
May 2016	Promocija plus	1,000	**61.7%**	38.3%

==== Švaljek–Mrak Taritaš ====
Date(s) conducted	Polling Organisation	Sample size	Sandra Švaljek	Anka Mrak Taritaš
24–26 March 2017	Ipsos Puls	600	**49.8%**	36.8%

=== Individual party standings ===
Date	Polling Organisation	Sample size	SDP	HDZ	BM 365	Most	NL Sandra Švaljek	Živi zid	HNS	NL Bruna Esih	Pametno	Others	Undecided	Lead
**21 May**	**Election results**	/	20.78%	**11.96%**	**23.03%**	**4.93%**	**12.43%**	**4.53%**	**(SDP)**	**8.23%**	**1.75%**	-	-	**2.25%**
May	Promocija plus	800	23.3%	13.1%	19.1%	4.4%	11.9%	4.7%	(SDP)	7.3%	-	N/A	N/A	**4.2%**
12–16 May	Ipsos Puls	1002	24.4%	13.5%	13.3%	4.9%	9.9%	6.5%	(SDP)	6.2%	-	9.5%	11.8%	**10.9%**
24–26 March	Ipsos Puls	600	23.2%	11.5%	22.0%	3.6%	19.5%	4.4%	(SDP)	3.7%	3%	4.3%	4.7%	**1.2%**
March	Promocija plus	800	26.8%	13.6%	19.2%	3.9%	11.8%	3.0%	(SDP)	7.0%	2.8%	0.6%	11.3%	**7.6%**
18 March	2x1 komunikacije	700	20.9%	17.3%	19.8%	4.4%	-	3.7%	5.8%	5.4%	-	-	14.9%	**1.1%**
**2017**
12–18 November	Promocija plus	1,000	27.0%	21.0%	11.0%	9.2%	9.9%	-	-	-	-	N/A	N/A	**6%**
24–28 October	Promocija plus	1,000	27.9%	21.1%	11.2%	9.9%	9.5%	6.7%	4.0%	-	-	N/A	N/A	**6.8%**
May	Promocija plus	1,000	29.4%	20.8%	14.5%	1.9%	11.5%	10.7%	2.1%	-	-	N/A	N/A	**6.3%**
**2016**

== See also ==
- 2017 Croatian local elections
- List of mayors in Croatia
- List of mayors of Zagreb
