= Stephen Nikola Bartulica =

Croatian politician

Stephen Nikola Bartulica MEP
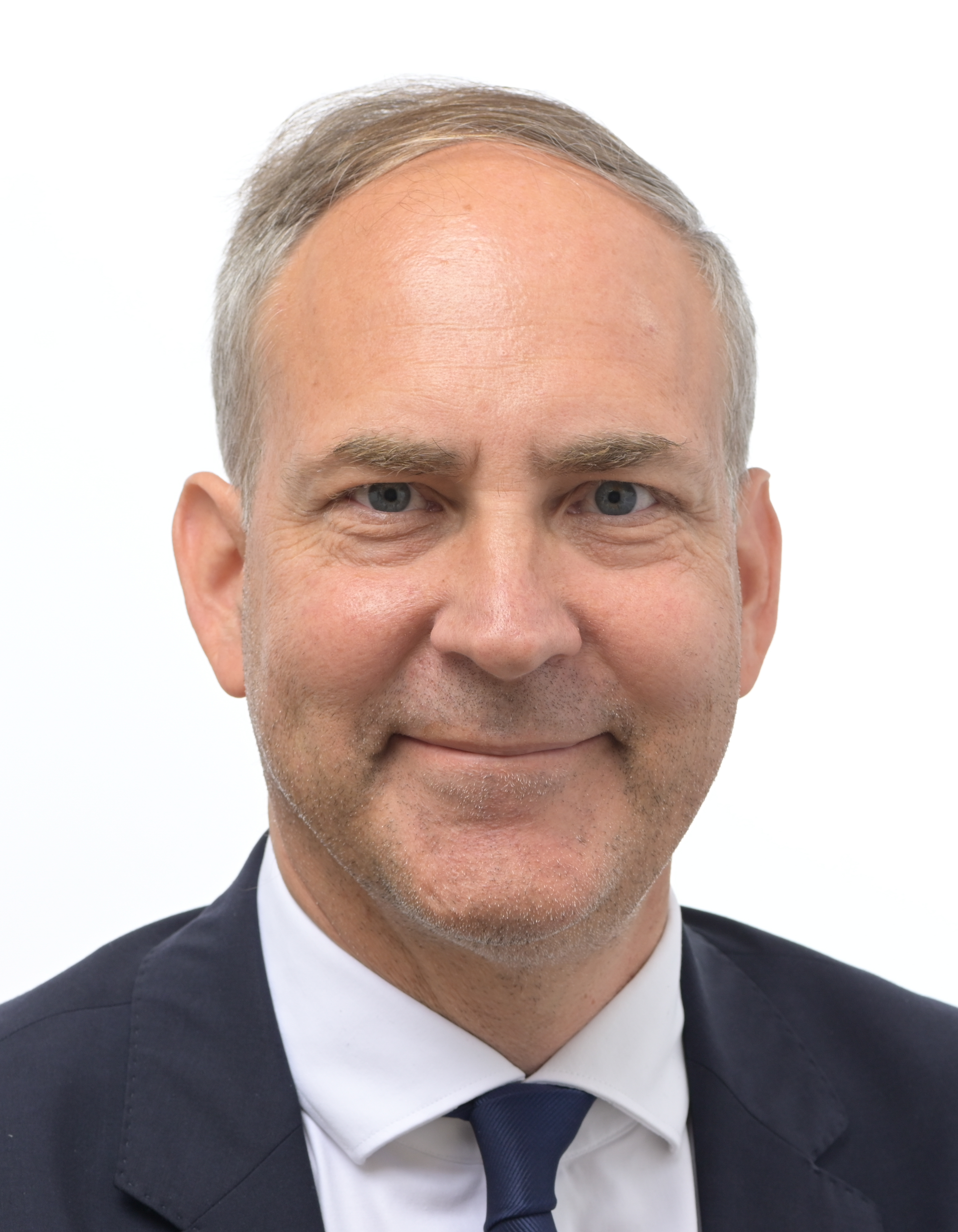

Member of the European Parliament for Croatia
- In office 16 July 2024

Member of the Croatian parliament
- In office 22 July 2020 – 16 July 2024

Personal details
- Born: 23 May 1970 (age 56) St. Joseph, Missouri, United States
- Party: Croatian; Home and National Rally; EU; European Conservatives and Reformists Group
- Other political affiliations: Homeland Movement (2020–2024)

Stephen Nikola Bartulica (born 23 May 1970) is a Croatian politician serving as member of the Croatian Parliament since 2020. He was elected as a member of the European Parliament for Croatia in 2024.

== Early life and education ==
Also known as Stjepo, Stephen Nikola Bartulica was born in St. Joseph, Missouri, United States, to Croatian immigrant parents.

His father Nikola Bartulica was from Split and had graduated from the Faculty of Medicine in Zagreb. His father was one of the first psychiatrists who examined seers at the apparitions at Medjugorje, in October 1981. After questioning, he said that for him "there was no doubt that the apparitions were real.". In the 1960s, Nikola Bartulica moved to the USA, where he met his wife, a cousin of Juraj Njavro from Vinkovci.

After attending the Benedictine boarding school, Stephen Bartulica earned a degree in political science at the University of Missouri. After graduating in 1992, Bartulica moved to Croatia, where he was employed at the Ministry of Foreign Affairs. He later earned a doctorate in political philosophy and ethics at the Pontifical Gregorian University.

Bartulica is married and has four sons. He met his future wife in 1996 in Zagreb: originally from the island of Prvić, she was then a student at the Faculty of Law in Zagreb. Bartulica has three younger brothers and a sister. Two of his brothers are ordained priests in the Roman Catholic Church. One of them, the late Angelo Bartulica, was a priest of the Diocese of Banja Luka in Bosnia and Herzegovina. Bartulica himself is a lay member of Opus Dei.

== Political career ==
Bartulica was active in Croatia's 2013 Croatian constitutional referendum on the definition of marriage and opposed the ratification of the Istanbul Convention.

He was elected at the 2020 Croatian parliamentary election for Miroslav Škoro's Homeland Movement.

Four years later, at the 2024 European elections, Bartulica was elected to the European Parliament, where he sits with the European Conservatives and Reformists Group led by Giorgia Meloni.

Few days before the European elections, Index.hr published a research article questioning the transparency of the finances and assets of Bartulica and his wife due to similar amounts of monthly income and loan payments, and he was accused of hiding part of his income. Bartulica stated that he pays for his daily living expenses with funds given to him by his mother, and that a co-borrower helps him with the loan, while claiming to be victim of "a smear campaign".

After being elected, Bartulica drove to the headquarters of the Homeland Movement in a Ferrari, which he claims he got on loan as a "message to those who abuse him and his family in the media space", and as "a gesture towards some people who were with [him] all this time when it was difficult". Some Croatian politicians expressed displeasure with this act, including Bartulica's party colleagues Josip Dabro and Ivan Penava, but also Prime Minister Andrej Plenković.

Bartulica left the Homeland Movement in August 2024, and co-founded the DOMiNO party, becoming the new party's international secretary.
