= Zvonimir Troskot =

Croatian politician, economist and former football player (born 1984)

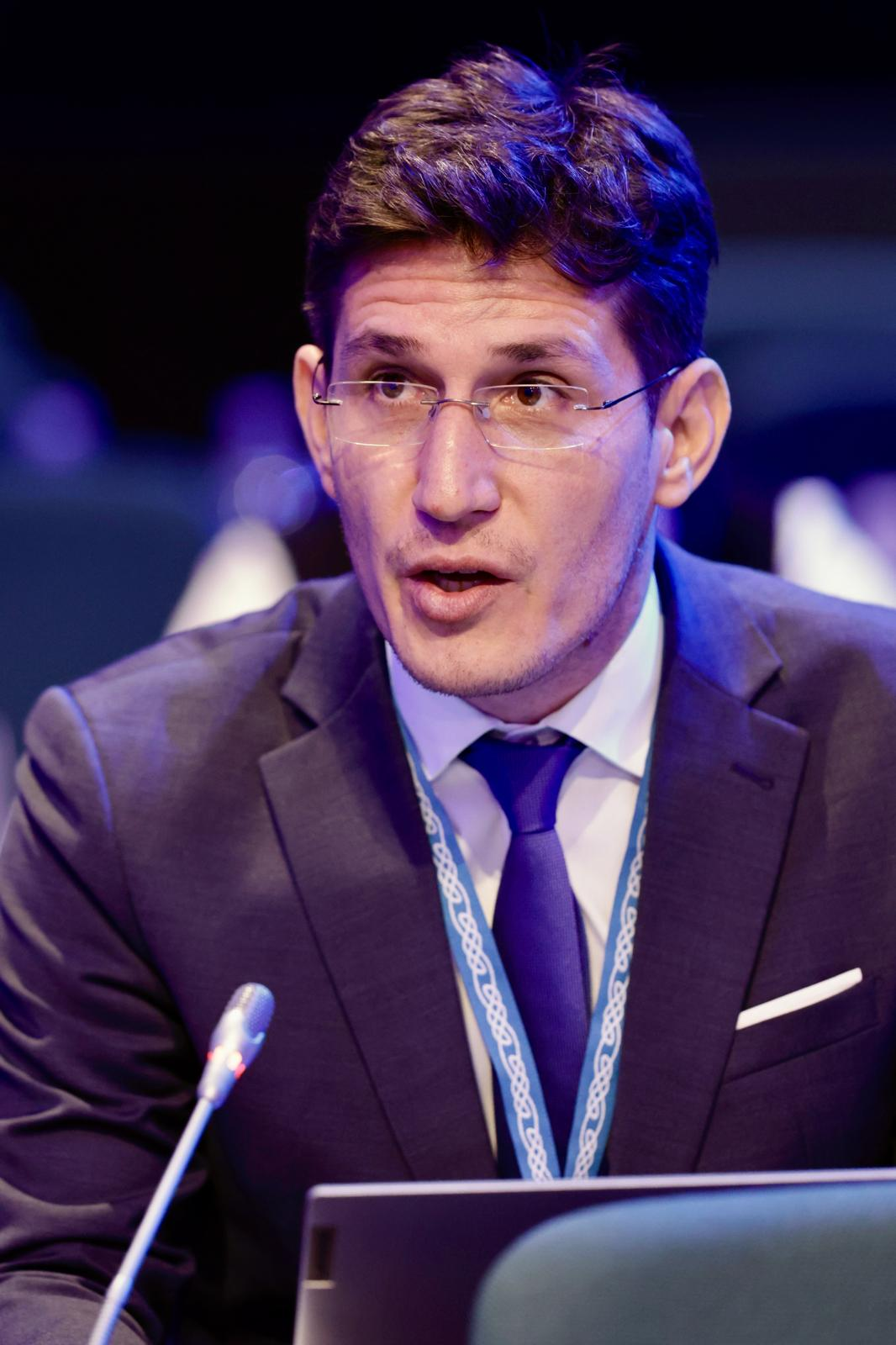
- Troskot in 2024

Member of the Croatian Parliament
- Incumbent
- Assumed office 22 July 2020
- Prime Minister: Andrej Plenković
- Constituency: Electoral district VII

Personal details
- Born: 5 October 1984 (age 42) Zagreb, SR Croatia, SFR Yugoslavia
- Party: The Bridge
- Education: University of Zagreb

Zvonimir Troskot (born 5 October 1984) is a Croatian politician, economist and former football player serving as a representative in the Croatian Parliament since 2020. A member of The Bridge, he was the party's mayoral candidate for the 2021 Zagreb local elections.

== Early life and education ==
Zvonimir Troskot was born on October 5, 1984, in Zagreb. An active football player, he was the goalkeeper for the junior team of Dinamo Zagreb and for the Croatian national under-16 team, with which he won third place at the 2001 UEFA European Championship.

He completed the Seventh Gymnasium in Zagreb. In 2006, he obtained a certificate in international economics, political science, and international relations at Georgetown University, and in 2008, after studying at the University of Lausanne, he received a certificate in financial management and engineering from the Swiss Finance Institute. In 2009, he graduated from the Faculty of Economics at the University of Zagreb.

== Political career ==
Troskot began his political career as the leader of the civic initiative "The People Decide" (Narod odlučuje), started by the Catholic association "On Behalf of the Family" in 2018. The goal of the initiative was to call a referendum to change the electoral system in Croatia by reducing the number of seats in Parliament, introducing new boundaries for electoral districts, lowering the electoral threshold, reducing the powers of national minority representatives, and other measures.

=== Member of parliament ===
In May 2020, shortly before the 2020 Croatian parliamentary election, he joined The Bridge. Troskot was a candidate in the election for electoral district VII and was elected to the 10th Sabor.

He ran again in the 2024 Croatian parliamentary election and won another term in the 11th sabor.

=== Mayoral candidate ===
On October 27, 2020, he was appointed as the Bridge's party commissioner for the City of Zagreb. On December 13, he announced he would be the Bridge's mayoral candidate for the 2021 Zagreb local elections. He received 13,480 votes (4.12%), finishing in seventh place and therefore did not advance to the second round. He did not endorse either candidate for the second round. He was also elected to the Zagreb City Assembly, but suspended his mandate after one month in the Assembly. He was replaced by Lovro Marković.

== See also ==
- List of members of the Sabor, 2020–2024
- List of members of the Sabor, 2024–
