= Ivan Penava =

Croatian kinesiologist and politician (born 1974)

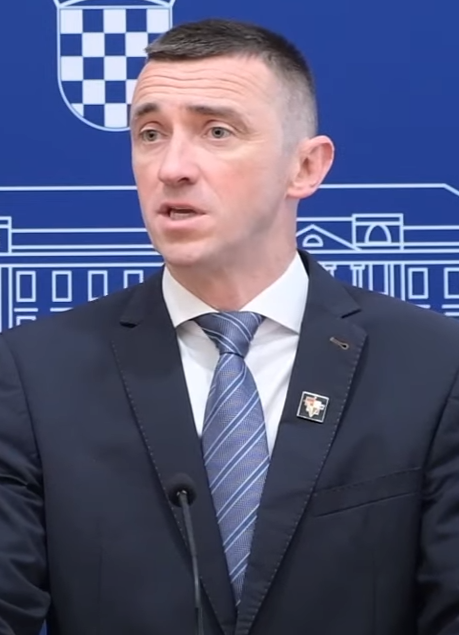
- Penava in 2023

Deputy Speaker of the Croatian Parliament
- Incumbent
- Assumed office 16 May 2024
- Constituency: V electoral district

Mayor of Vukovar
- In office 16 June 2014 – 6 June 2025
- Preceded by: Željko Sabo
- Succeeded by: Marijan Pavliček

Personal details
- Born: 31 December 1974 (age 51) Vukovar, SR Croatia, SFR Yugoslavia
- Party: HDZ (until 2020); DP (2020–present)
- Children: 2
- Education: University of Zagreb
- Occupation: Kinesiologist; politician

Ivan Penava (born 31 December 1974) is a Croatian kinesiologist and politician who served as the mayor of Vukovar from 16 June 2014 to 6 June 2025. He was a member of the Croatian Parliament since 14 October 2016 to 20 October 2016 and is member of Croatian Parliament from 22 July 2020 to present. A former member of the Croatian Democratic Union (HDZ), he is now the president of the right-wing populist Homeland Movement (DP) since 9 October 2021.

== Early life, education and career ==
Penava was born on 31 December 1974 in Vukovar, SR Croatia, SFR Yugoslavia. His parents are from Posušje in Herzegovina. Penava spent his childhood in the district of Borovo Naselje.

He enrolled in the High School of Mathematics and Informatics in Vukovar, however, following the Croatian War of Independence and the Battle of Vukovar, the family had to flee to Varaždin where Penava continued his education and later moved to Zagreb where he graduated from the XV Gymnasium.

After high school, he decided to focus his interest on sports, considering that he had been very active and successful in rowing since elementary school. He entered the Faculty of Kinesiology in Zagreb, where he graduated in 1999 and earned the title of professor of kinesiology. In the same year, he represented Croatia at the Military World Games in the rowing team, and performed at international rowing regattas for veterans.

Penava returned to Vukovar and got a job as a physical education and health professor at the Vukovar School of Economics. After eight years of teaching, he was elected director. During three semesters, he worked as an external associate for physical education and health at Lavoslav Ružički Polytechnic School in Vukovar.

He gained his doctorate at the Faculty of Economics in 2010, with a thesis titled "Alignment of Vocational Education with the Labor Market". He is also the author of several published works in this field.

== Political career ==
=== Croatian Democratic Union ===
In 2014, Penava ran for mayor of Vukovar in early local elections as a representative of Croatian Democratic Union (HDZ)-led coalition, and in the second round he defeated the previous mayor, Željko Sabo, who was an independent candidate with the support of the Social Democratic Party (SDP)-led coalition. Penava was elected to the Croatian Parliament in the 2016 parliamentary election. He was re-elected mayor in 2017, winning 61.72% of the popular vote.

Penava opposed the official status of the Serbian language in Vukovar, which ended in 2021 when the Serb population fell below 1/3 of the total population of Vukovar. In 2019, Penava attended a Serb Orthodox Christian Easter service but later that same year he criticized Serb pupils from Vukovar for not standing up for the Croatian national anthem and called Serb politicians in Croatia "nationalists who want a Greater Serbia".

=== Homeland Movement ===
In 2020, Penava announced his departure from the HDZ to join the right-wing populist Homeland Movement (DP) of Miroslav Škoro, stating that he would "never and under no circumstances" be in a coalition with Milorad Pupovac and his Independent Democratic Serb Party (SDSS). He was re-elected to the parliament in the 2020 election.

In October 2021, Penava was elected president of DP, succeeding Škoro.

== Personal life ==
Penava is married and has two children. He is a Roman Catholic. Besides his native Croatian, he also speaks English.
