= Jelena Pavičić Vukičević =

Croatian politician (born 1975)

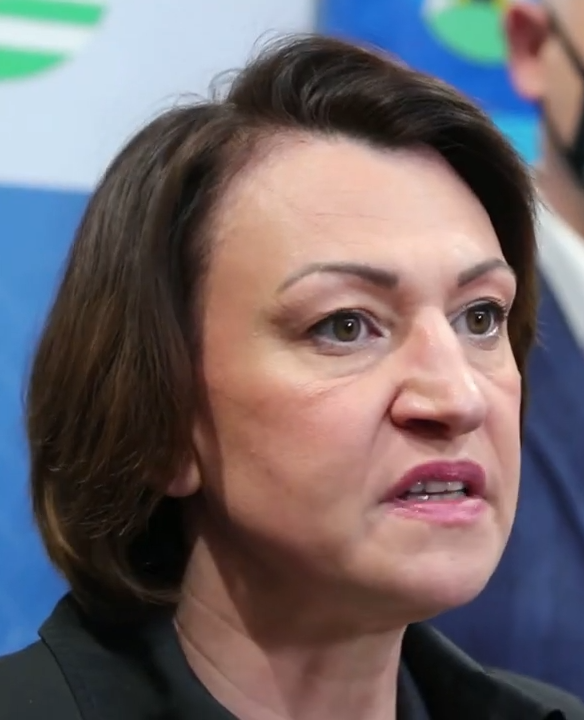
- Pavičić Vukičević in April 2021

Mayor of Zagreb Acting
- In office 28 February 2021 – 4 June 2021
- Deputy: Olivera Majić
- Preceded by: Milan Bandić
- Succeeded by: Tomislav Tomašević

President of the Bandić Milan 365 - Labour and Solidarity Party
- In office 28 February 2021 – 12 December 2021
- Preceded by: Milan Bandić
- Succeeded by: Slavko Kojić

Member of the Croatian Parliament for 1st electoral district
- In office 22 December 2003 – 11 January 2008

Personal details
- Born: 2 September 1975 (age 51) Zagreb, SR Croatia, SFR Yugoslavia
- Party: SDP (1997–2009); BM 365 (2015–present)
- Education: University of Zagreb

Jelena Pavičić Vukičević (born 2 September 1975) is a Croatian politician who served as president of the Bandić Milan 365 - Labour and Solidarity Party. She assumed the position following the death of the previous party president, Milan Bandić, on 28 February 2021. Pavičić Vukičević also assumed Bandić's role of the mayor of Zagreb, which she served until the 4 June 2021, following her loss at the 2021 Zagreb mayoral elections.

== Early life and career ==
Jelena Pavičić was born in Zagreb on 2 September 1975. She studied comparative literature at the Faculty of Philosophy at the University of Zagreb. From 1999 to 2001 she was a part-time associate at the Miroslav Krleža Lexicographic Institute in the editorial office of the Croatian Biographical Lexicon. From 2011 to 2013 she was a council member of the University of Zagreb.

== Political career ==
Pavičić Vukičević was the secretary of the Zagreb organization of the Social Democratic Party from 2000 to 2003. From 2001 to 2005, she was a member of the Zagreb City Assembly and secretary of the SDP club. From 2003 to 2007, she was a member of the SDP in the 5th session of the Croatian Parliament. From 2005 to 2008, she was a city representative in the Zagreb Assembly, president of the SDP club and president of the SDP-HSS-HSU coalition club. In 2008, she was appointed head of the city office for education, culture and sports. She held this position until 2009. From 2011 to 2013 she was a member of the Croatian delegation of observers to the European Committee of the Regions of the European Parliament, and in 2013 when Croatia became a member of the European Union, she became a member of the Croatian delegation to the Committee of the Regions.

=== Acting mayor of Zagreb and 2021 mayoral election ===
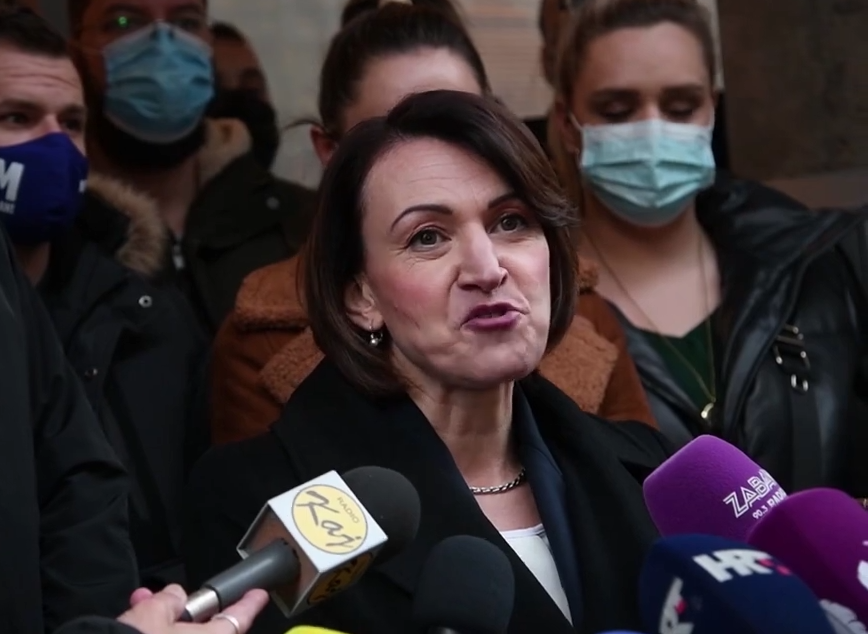
Pavičić Vukičević announcing her candidacy for mayor of Zagreb, March 2021

Following the death of Milan Bandić on 28 February 2021, Pavičić Vukičević became acting Mayor of Zagreb and President of the Bandić's Labour and Solidarity Party. On 11 March, she announced that she would succeed Bandić as the party president permanently. On 18 March, she announced her candidacy for the mayor in the 2021 Zagreb local elections.

Pavičić Vukičević inherited a Zagreb ravaged by the multiple calamities of 2020 Zagreb earthquake, 2020 Zagreb flash flood, 2020 Petrinja earthquake and the COVID-19 pandemic. The earthquakes produced over €11 billion in damages in the city. Her controversial predecessor as mayor, and close associate, Milan Bandić, was criticised for the city's poor recovery. In spite of this, Pavičić Vukičević spoke positively of Bandić and said she would continue his legacy, choosing to keep Bandić's name as part of the party's name.

On the 16 May elections, Pavičić Vukičević won 36,309 votes (11.10%), making her the third-placed and non-eligible for the second round.

Pavičić Vukičević left her office and handover it to newly elected mayor Tomislav Tomašević on 4 June 2021.

== See also ==
- List of members of Croatian Parliament, 2003–07
- List of mayors of Zagreb

Political offices
Preceded by Milan Bandić	Acting Mayor of Zagreb; 2021	Succeeded by Tomislav Tomašević
Party political offices
Preceded by Milan Bandić	President of Labour and Solidarity Party; 2021 – present	Incumbent
