= Sandra Švaljek =

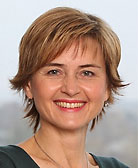

Deputy Governor of the Croatian National Bank
- Incumbent
- Assumed office 18 July 2018
- Preceded by: Relja Martić

Mayor of Zagreb Acting
- In office 21 November 2014 – 9 March 2015; During the suspension of Milan Bandić

Deputy Mayor of Zagreb
- In office 2 June 2013 – 27 March 2015

Personal details
- Born: 23 February 1970 (age 56) Krapina, SR Croatia, SFR Yugoslavia
- Party: Independent
- Education: University of Zagreb
- Occupation: Economist; researcher; policy maker; politician

Sandra Švaljek (born 23 February 1970) is a Croatian economist, politician and a former independent member of the Zagreb Assembly. She currently is the first deputy governor of the Croatian National Bank.

== Career ==
She got her PhD with the thesis "Fiscal deficit and public debt: policy, theory and empirics" in 2000. She built her working career at The Institute of Economics in Zagreb, where she is a senior research associate, and for eight years she was the director of the institute.

Special areas of interest to her are fiscal and tax policy as well as economic effects of aging. From 2000. to 2013. she was a member of the Croatian National Bank Council. She was the consultant for economy with Prime Minister Jadranka Kosor from 2010 to 2011. She is the author and co-author of numerous scientific papers.

She is fluent in English, German and French, and understands Italian.

== Acting Mayor of Zagreb ==
On the direct elections held on 2 June 2013 Sandra Švaljek was appointed the first Deputy Mayor of the City of Zagreb and exercised the duty until 20 November 2014 and again from 10 March to 27 March 2015.

With the Zagreb County Court decisions concerning the prohibition and elimination of the prohibition of carrying out his professional duties to the Mayor Milan Bandic, from 21 November 2014 to 9 March 2015 she was the Acting Mayor of Zagreb.

She attended the Sljeme FIS World Cup Snow Queen, where she handed the winning crown to Mikaeli Shiffrin. During her mandate as Acting Mayor of Zagreb Sandra Švaljek proposed the city budget for 2015, carried out the first public tender for the Board of the Zagreb Holding and adopted several amendments to city decisions. After the Mayor Bandić gave power of attorney to his second deputy Vesna Kusin, on 27 March 2015 she resigned her position as deputy mayor. Following the resignation she returned to the Institute of Economics and activated her mandate in the Zagreb City Assembly.
