= Podsused – Vrapče =

City district of Zagreb, Croatia

Coordinates: 45°49′17.35″N 15°52′24.47″E

- District of Zagreb
- Podsused – Vrapče as a part of Zagreb
- Country: Croatia
- County/City: Zagreb

Government
  - Council President: Ivan Vedak (M!-SDP)
  - District Council: Composition (15): M!-SDP (9); HDZ-DP-HSU-HSS (2); Marija Selak Raspudić list (2); Only Croatia-DOMiNO-HS-Blok (1); Davor Bernardić list (1)

Area
  - Total: 36.188 km^{2} (13.972 sq mi)

Population (2021)
  - Total: 44,910
  - Density: 1,241/km^{2} (3,214/sq mi)

Map

Podsused – Vrapče is one of the districts of Zagreb, Croatia. It is located in the north-western part of the city. In 2011, the district had 45,759 inhabitants. Its area is 36.188 km^{2}.

== Climate ==
From 1952 to 1986, the coldest temperature was −25.5 °C (−13.9 °F), on 16 February 1956.

== List of neighborhoods in Podsused – Vrapče ==
- Vrapče
- Susedgrad
- Podsused
- Gajnice
- Gornji Stenjevec
