= Green List (2017) =

Green List Zelena lista
- Leader: Nenad Matić
- Founded: 2017
- Headquarters: Zagreb
- Ideology: Green politics Christian democracy
- Colours: Green

Website
- https://www.zeleni.hr/

The Green List (Croatian: Zelena lista or ZL) is a green political party in Croatia. It was founded in 2017 prior to the 2017 local elections in which they run in coalition with Bandić Milan 365 – Labour and Solidarity Party. In addition to their green politics, the party is Christian Democratic compared to other green parties in the world.

== History ==
Green List was founded in 2017 by graduate engineer in agronomy Nenad Matić, an ex-member of the Croatian Peasant Party. The party shares a name with the defunct liberal Green List (2005-2014), but the membership is ideologically different.

In 2017, the party first appeared on the ballot together with the current mayor of Zagreb Milan Bandić and two more parties, winning one seat.Four years later, the party entered a coalition with the Homeland Movement and supported Miroslav Škoro as a candidate for mayor. The party won one seat again.

In 2019, Green List participated in European elections solo but failed to pass the threshold .

During 2019-20 presidential election, they supported Miroslav Škoro as a candidate.

In 2020, the parliamentary Green List entered a coalition of several conservative and right-wing parties led by Homeland Movement, but did not win any seats.

== Elections ==
=== Zagreb Assembly ===
Election	In coalition with	Votes won	Percentage	Seats won	Change
Election	In coalition with	(Coalition totals)		(ZL only)	
2017	BM365 - SMSH - NS R	74,467	23.03%	1 / 51	▲1
2021	DP	33,943	10.59%	1 / 47	0

=== European Parliament ===
Election	In coalition with	Votes won	Percentage	Seats won	Change
Election	In coalition with	(Coalition totals)		(ZL only)	
2019	None	5,972	0.56%	0 / 12	0

=== Legislative ===
Election	In coalition with	Votes won	Percentage	Seats won	Change	Government
Election	In coalition with	(Coalition totals)		(ZL only)		Government
2020	DP–HS–HKS–HRAST–BzH - SU	181,493	10.89%	0 / 151	New	Extra-parliamentary
2024	DP–PiP–BzH	202,714	9.56%	0 / 151	0	Extra-parliamentary

=== President of Croatia ===
Election	Candidate	Votes won	Percentage	Rank	Votes won	Percentage	Rank
Election	Candidate	First round			Second round		
2019–20	Miroslav Škoro	465,704	24.75%	3rd	—N/a		

== See also ==
- Green party
- Green politics
- List of environmental organizations
