= Law and Justice (Croatia) =

Croatian political party

Law and Justice Pravo i Pravda
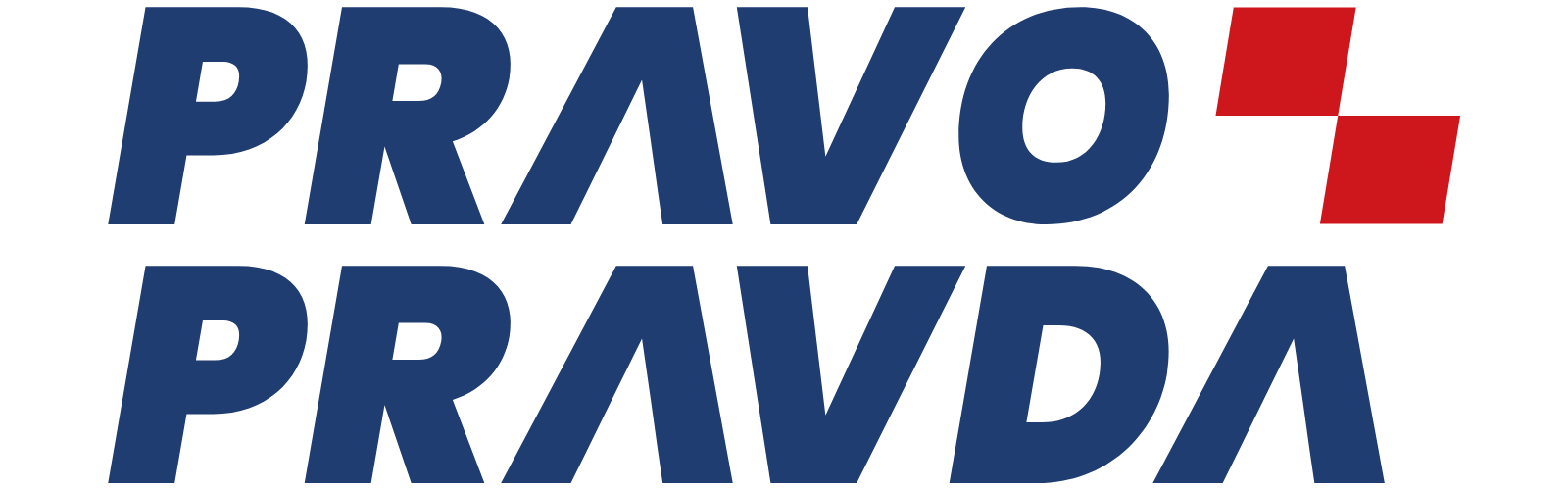
- Abbreviation: PiP
- President: Mislav Kolakušić
- Vice Presidents: Ivan Vilibor Sinčić; Ivan Lovrinović
- Secretary: Dražen Dizdar
- Founders: Mislav Kolakušić; Ivan Vilibor Sinčić; Ivan Lovrinović
- Founded: 3 February 2024; 2 years ago
- Merger of: The Key of Croatia; Let's Change Croatia
- Headquarters: Savska cesta 41; Zagreb, Croatia
- Ideology: Populism; Euroscepticism; Anti-establishment
- Political position: Right-wing
- European Parliament group: Non-Inscrits (2024)
- Colours: Dark blue
- Sabor: 1 / 151
- European Parliament: 0 / 12
- County Prefects: 0 / 21
- Mayors: 0 / 128

Website
- pravoipravda.hr

Law and Justice (Croatian: Pravo i Pravda) is a populist political party in Croatia. It was founded as a merger of The Key of Croatia (KLJUČ, formerly known as Human Shield), Let's Change Croatia (PH) and the Independent List of Mislav Kolakušić.

The souverainist party seeks to fight against corruption, globalization, immigration and "gender ideology". It shares the name and a similar brand to that of the Polish Law and Justice party.

The party's president is Mislav Kolakušić, while the leaders of former parties that merged into PiP, Ivan Vilibor Sinčić (KLJUČ) and Ivan Lovrinović (PH) are Vice Presidents.

It ran in the 2024 parliamentary elections in a coalition with Homeland Movement. Kolakušić was elected to the Sabor.

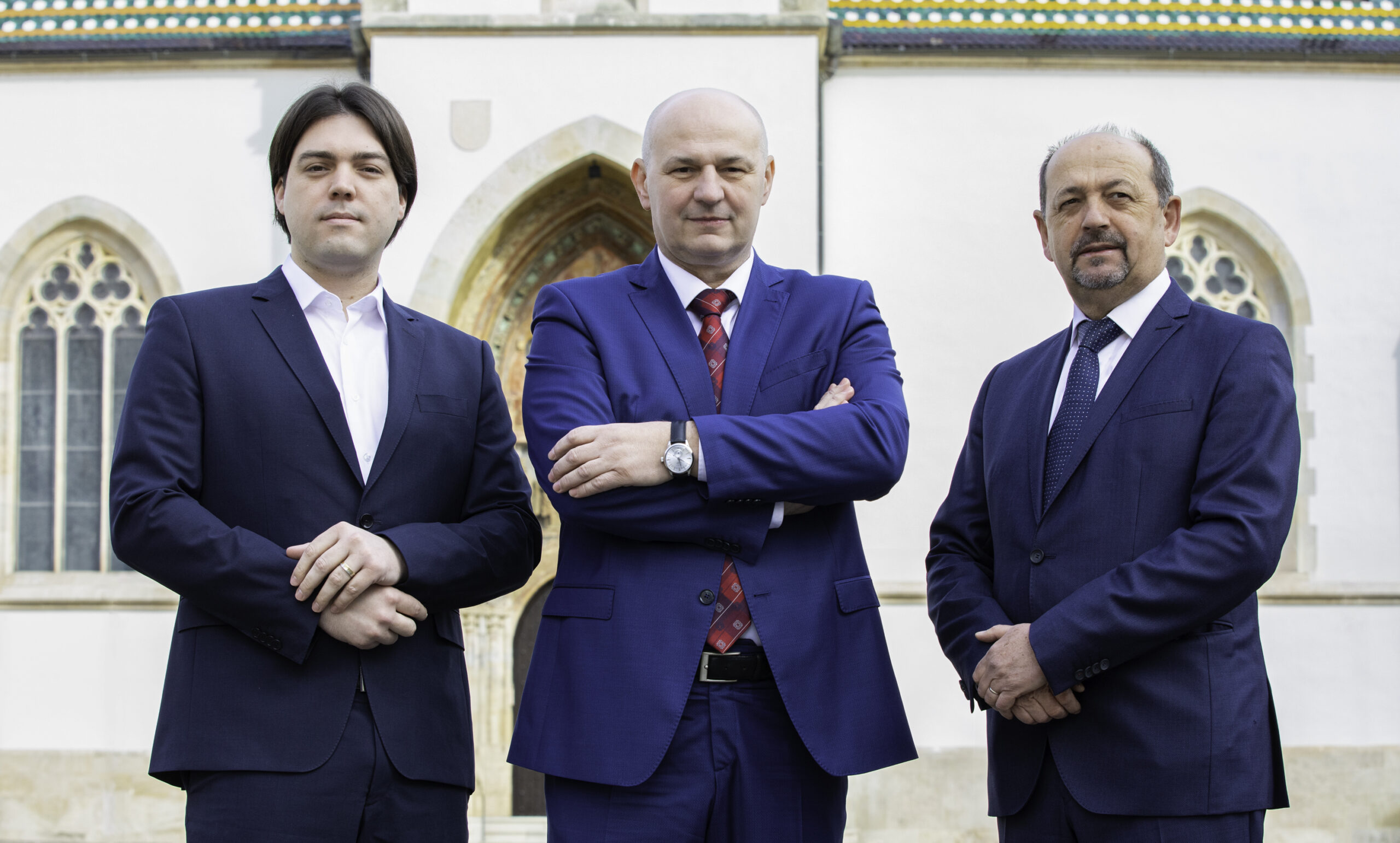
The party leadership (Ivan Vilibor Sinčić, Mislav Kolakušić and Ivan Lovrinović)

== Election results ==
=== Legislative ===
Election	Coalition	Votes won	Percentage	Seats won	Change	Government (PiP only)
Election	Coalition	(Coalition totals)		(PiP only)		Government (PiP only)
2024	DP–BzH–ZL	202,714	9.56%	1 / 151	New	Opposition

=== European Parliament ===
Election	List leader	Coalition	Votes	%	Seats	+/–	EP Group
Election	List leader	Coalition	Coalition		PiP		EP Group
2024	Mislav Kolakušić	None	22,214	2.98 (#8)	0 / 12	New	–
