= Gornja Dubrava =

City district of Zagreb, Croatia

Coordinates: 45°50′28.05″N 16°3′20.38″E

Trešnjevka – jug
- District of Zagreb
- Gornja Dubrava as a part of Zagreb
- Country: Croatia
- County/City: Zagreb

Government
  - Council President: Dario Marić (HDZ-DP-HSU-HSS)
  - District Council: Composition (19): M!-SDP (7); HDZ-DP-HSU-HSS (5); Marija Selak Raspudić list (3); Independent (2); Davor Bernardić list (1); Only Croatia-DOMiNO-HS-Blok (1)

Area
  - Total: 40.266 km^{2} (15.547 sq mi)

Population (2021)
  - Total: 58,255
  - Density: 1,446.8/km^{2} (3,747.1/sq mi)

Gornja Dubrava district Gornja Dubrava local council Dubrava - center local council

Gornja Dubrava (pronounced [ɡôːrɲaː dǔbraʋa], "Upper Dubrava") is one of the districts of Zagreb, Croatia. It is located in the northeastern part of the city and has 61,841 inhabitants (2011 census).

== Administrative division ==
The district is composed of the following neighborhoods (mjesni odbori):

- Branovec - Jalševec
- Čučerje
- Dankovec
- Dubec
- Dubrava - središte (center)
- Gornja Dubrava
- Granešina
- Granešinski Novaki
- Klaka
- Miroševec
- Novoselec
- Oporovec
- Poljanice
- Studentski grad
- Trnovčica
- Zeleni brijeg

The areas of the local city councils of Gornja Dubrava and Dubrava - center are located in the southern part of the district and have a population of 6,225 and 7,102, respectively (census 2021).
