= Bandić Milan 365 – Labour and Solidarity Party =

Bandić Milan 365 – Labour and Solidarity Party Bandić Milan 365 – Stranka rada i solidarnosti
- Abbreviation: BM 365
- President: Slavko Kojić
- Founder: Milan Bandić
- Founded: 28 March 2015
- Headquarters: Zagreb, Croatia
- Membership (2022): 3,171
- Ideology: Social democracy; Populism Localism
- Political position: Centre-left
- Colours: Blue; Red; Green
- Sabor: 0 / 151
- European Parliament: 0 / 12
- County Prefects: 0 / 21
- Mayors: 1 / 128
- Zagreb Assembly: 0 / 47

Website
- www.365ris.hr

Bandić Milan 365 – Labour and Solidarity Party (Croatian: Bandić Milan 365 – Stranka rada i solidarnosti or BM 365) is a political party in Croatia founded in 2015 by then Mayor of Zagreb Milan Bandić.

== History ==
Former party logo

The party was founded in Zagreb on 28 March 2015 by then Mayor of Zagreb Milan Bandić and his associates.

In the 2015 parliamentary election, the party participated with 13 coalition partners, won 2 seats in the Croatian Parliament, and eventually signed coalition agreement with the centre-right Patriotic Coalition and Bridge of Independent Lists (MOST), voting in favor of approving Cabinet of Tihomir Orešković. In the 2016 parliamentary election, BM 365 retained 1 MP who voted in favor of approving Cabinet of Andrej Plenković.

Following the death of Milan Bandić on 28 February 2021, the party's vice-president Jelena Pavičić Vukičević became the acting president. On 11 December Slavko Kojić was elected as new president of the party, replacing Pavičić Vukičević.

== Election history ==
=== Legislative ===
The following is a summary of the party's results in legislative elections for the Croatian parliament. The "Total votes" and "Percentage" columns include sums of votes won by pre-election coalitions BM 365 had been part of.

Election	In coalition with	Votes won	Percentage	Seats won	Change	Government
Election	In coalition with	(Coalition totals)		(MB 365-RIS only)		Government
2015	DPS, DSŽ, HES, HRS, HSZ-ES-Z, ID - DI, MS, NSH, NV-SR, SU, UDU, ZS-Z, ZS	74,301	3.32%	2 / 151	▲2	Government support
2016	NS-R, Novi val, HSS SR, BUZ	76,054	4.04%	1 / 151	▼1	Government support
2020	None	9,897	0.59%	0 / 151	▼1	Extraparliamentary

=== European Parliament ===
Election	In coalition with	Votes won	Percentage	Seats won	Change
2019	None	21,175	1.97%	0 / 12	Steady

=== Zagreb City Assembly ===
Election	In coalition with	Votes won	Percentage	Seats won	Seat change	Government
2017	NS-R-SMSH-ZL	74,467	23.03%	14 / 51	▲3	government
2021	ZL	28,996	9.04%	5 / 47	▼6	opposition
