= Branko Vukelić =

Croatian politician (1958–2013)

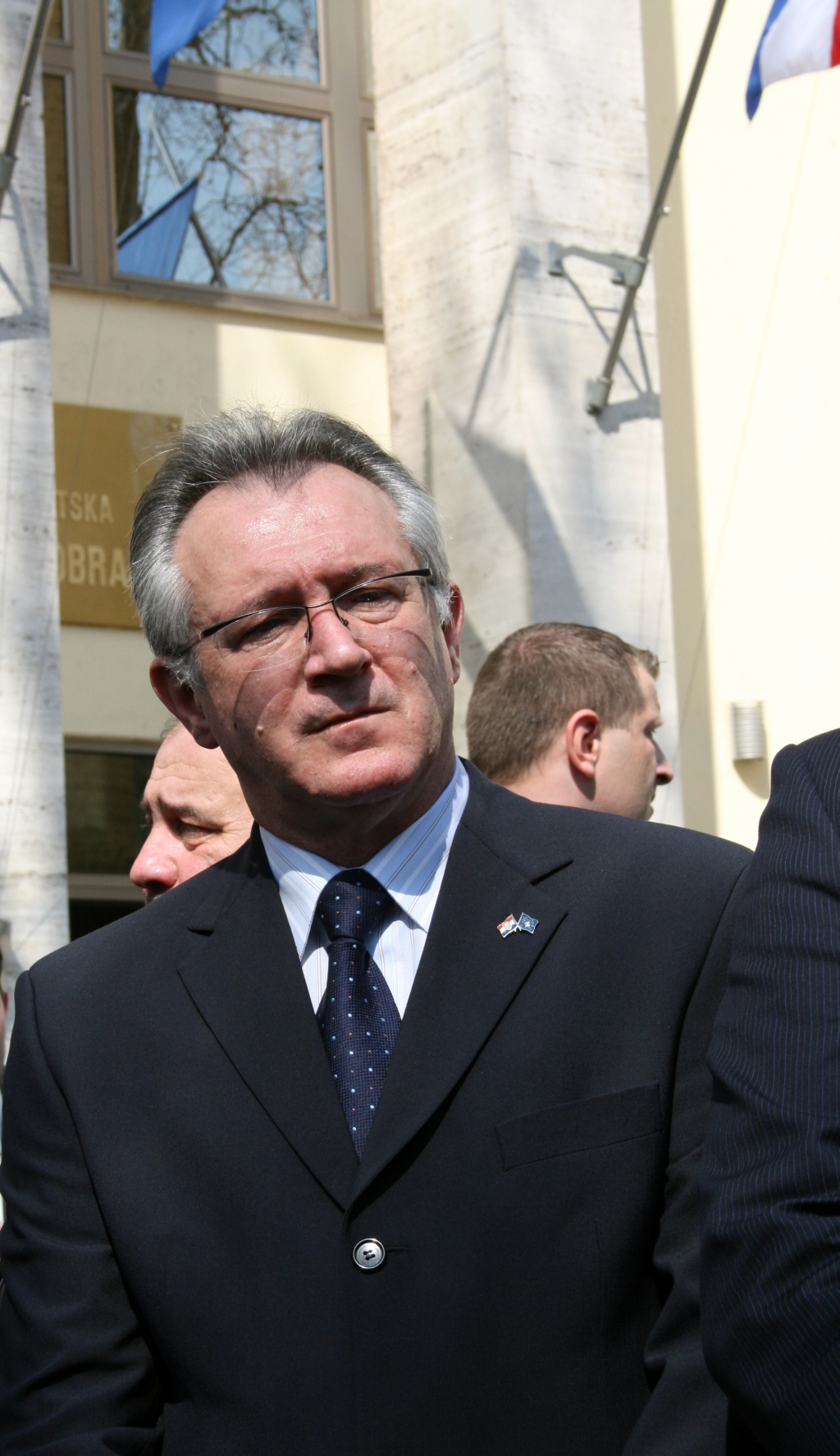
- Branko Vukelić in April 2009

Minister of Defence
- In office 12 January 2008 – 29 December 2010
- Prime Minister: Ivo Sanader (2008–2009); Jadranka Kosor (2009–2010)
- Preceded by: Berislav Rončević
- Succeeded by: Davor Božinović

Personal details
- Born: 9 March 1958 Karlovac, PR Croatia, FPR Yugoslavia (modern Croatia)
- Died: 3 May 2013 (aged 55) Karlovac, Croatia
- Party: Independent (since 2013) Croatian Democratic Union (until 2013)
- Spouse: Đurđica Vukelić
- Children: 1
- Education: University of Zagreb

Branko Vukelić (9 March 1958 – 3 May 2013) was a Croatian politician who served as Minister of Defence of Croatia from 2008 to 2010 and as Minister of the Economy, Labour and Entrepreneurship from 2003 to 2008. He was one of the most prominent political figures from the city of Karlovac during the 1990s and 2000s.

He graduated from the Faculty of Electrical Engineering at the University of Zagreb in 1981. Before entering politics, he worked at EAB Karlovac and later at INA, where he served as head of the Karlovac branch office.

Vukelić began his political career in Karlovac, first as a member of the City Council and later as mayor from 1997 to 2001. A member of the Croatian Democratic Union (HDZ), he held several senior party positions at the local and regional levels.

He was elected to the Croatian Parliament in 2003, but placed his mandate on hold after being appointed Minister of the Economy in the government of Prime Minister Ivo Sanader. He served in that position until January 2008, when he became Minister of Defence. During his term, Croatia became a full member of NATO in 2009.

After leaving the Ministry of Defence in 2010, he returned to Parliament, where he served until his death in 2013.

== Personal life ==
Vukelić was closely connected to his native village of Cerovac Vukmanićki. He enjoyed horticulture, gardening and spending time outdoors, which he often described as his main source of personal balance and peace. He was also a dog lover, particularly fond of German Shepherds.

== Death ==
In late 2009 he suffered a heart attack and underwent stent implantation. He was later diagnosed with pancreatic cancer, with which he battled for about two years. He died on 3 May 2013 at the Karlovac General Hospital at the age of 55. He was buried with military honours in Vukmanić, near his birthplace.

== Legacy ==
As mayor of Karlovac, Vukelić supported several infrastructure projects in the post-war period. One of the most notable was the planned bridge over the Korana River, which became popularly known as the “Vukelić Bridge” in local media and public discourse.

At the national level, he is remembered for his role in economic policy during Croatia's EU pre-accession period and for overseeing the defence sector during the country's accession to NATO.
