= Donja Dubrava, Zagreb =

City district of Zagreb, Croatia

Coordinates: 45°49′34.37″N 16°3′4.39″E

Donja Dubrava
- District of Zagreb
- Donja Dubrava as a part of Zagreb
- Country: Croatia
- County/City: Zagreb

Government
  - Council President: Trpimir Macan (HDZ-DP-HSU-HSS)
  - District Council: Composition (15): HDZ-DP-HSU-HSS (4); Independent (4); M!-SDP (3); BUZ-Plavi grad (1); Pavle Kalinić-ZDS list (1); Most-HSP (1); Only Croatia-DOMiNO-HS-Blok (1)

Area
  - Total: 10.810 km^{2} (4.174 sq mi)

Population (2021)
  - Total: 33,537
  - Density: 3,102.4/km^{2} (8,035.2/sq mi)

Map

Donja Dubrava (Croatian pronunciation: [dôːɲaː dǔbraʋa], "Lower Dubrava") is one of the districts of Zagreb, Croatia. It is located in the northeastern part of the city and in 2011 had 36,363 inhabitants.

== History ==
In 1883, Oskar Pongratz bought a manor in the Čulinec hamlet in Dubrava from the Erdődy family.

== Administrative division ==
The district is composed of the following neighborhoods (mjesni odbori):

- Čulinec
- Donja Dubrava
- "Ivan Mažuranić"
- Novi Retkovec
- Resnički Gaj
- Stari Retkovec
- "30. svibnja 1990."
- Trnava
