= Miroslav Škoro =

Croatian politician and musician (born 1962)

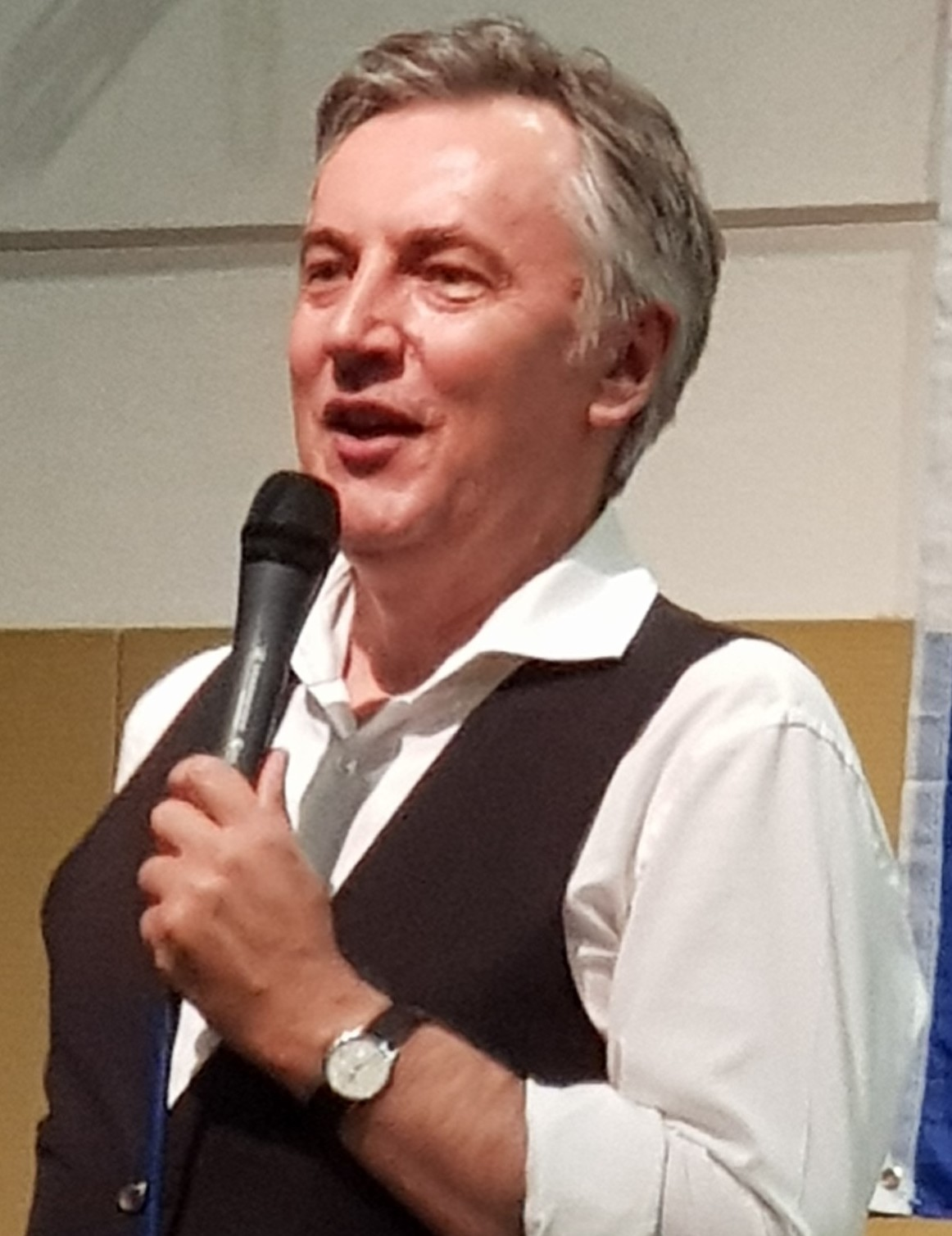

Deputy Speaker of the Croatian Parliament
- In office 22 July 2020 – 20 August 2021
- Preceded by: Božo Petrov
- Succeeded by: Davorko Vidović

Member of the Croatian Parliament
- In office 22 July 2020 – 16 May 2024
- Constituency: II electoral district
- In office 11 January 2008 – 19 December 2008
- Succeeded by: Berislav Rončević
- Constituency: IV electoral district

Member of the Zagreb Assembly
- Incumbent
- Assumed office 17 June 2021

President of the Homeland Movement
- In office 29 February 2020 – 20 July 2021
- Preceded by: Position established
- Succeeded by: Mario Radić (Acting); Ivan Penava

Personal details
- Born: 29 July 1962 (age 64) Osijek, PR Croatia, FPR Yugoslavia
- Party: HDZ (2007–2012); DP (2020–2021)
- Spouse: Kim Ann Luzaich (m. 1989)
- Children: 2
- Education: Community College of Allegheny County; University of Osijek
- Occupation: Musician; TV host; politician
- Musical career
- Genres: Pop; folk
- Instrument: Vocals
- Years active: 1989–present
- Labels: Croatia Records; Campus; Menart; Hit Records
- Website: skoro.hr

Miroslav Škoro (pronounced [mîroslaʋ ʃkǒːro]; born 29 July 1962) is a Croatian politician, musician, TV host and former diplomat. He is the founder and the first president of the conservative Homeland Movement party, which he established in February 2020 and led until July 2021. As a musician, Škoro is best known for using the traditional Slavonian tamburica instrument in most of his compositions.

In the 2007 parliamentary election he was elected member of the Croatian Parliament for the Croatian Democratic Union party and held the office from January 2008 until his resignation in November of the same year. On 23 June 2019, he announced that he would contest the December presidential election as an independent candidate. He ended up finishing in third place with 24.45% of the vote – behind former prime minister Zoran Milanović (who ultimately won the election) and incumbent president Kolinda Grabar-Kitarović, and thus did not advance to the run-off in January 2020. On 29 February 2020, he announced that he would be forming, as well as personally chairing, a new political party called the Miroslav Škoro Homeland Movement, which contested the July 2020 parliamentary election as part of a wider coalition of conservative and right-wing parties. On 5 March 2021, Škoro launched a campaign to contest the 2021 Zagreb local elections, with himself as the Homeland Movement's candidate for mayor of Zagreb and with the party also presenting a candidate list for the Zagreb City Assembly (in a coalition with the Green List).

== Early life ==
Born in Osijek, Škoro completed a civil engineering degree at the University of Osijek. He subsequently spent some time in the United States where he attended the Community College of Allegheny County for two years. During his time in the United States, he co-wrote his first album Ne dirajte mi ravnicu with Pennsylvania native and tamburitza virtuoso Jerry Grcevich.

== Music career ==
Škoro emerged onto the Croatian music scene with the debut album Ne dirajte mi ravnicu and produced a song of the same name which would go on to be one of the most famous Croatian songs. The tambura group Zlatni dukati released their own cover of the song that same year. In 2002, Škoro collaborated with Marko Perković on the song "Reci, brate moj" (Tell Me, My Brother). In the year after the collaboration was renewed in the single "Sude mi" ([They're] Putting Me on Trial), dedicated to retired Croatian general Ante Gotovina.

Between 2001 and 2006, Škoro was the chairman of the board of Croatia Records, the largest record company in Croatia.

In 2003, Škoro was a judge in Story Supernova Music Talents, a reality show aired on Nova TV, and performed his song "Mata" at the funeral of general Janko Bobetko. In 2004, his song "Milo moje" (My Sweet) won the Croatian Musicians Union's annual award for hit song. His 2005 album, Svetinja (Shrine), sold over 20,000 copies.

== Political career ==
From 1995 to 1997, Škoro was the Croatian general consul to Hungary.

On 30 October 2007, Škoro joined the Croatian Democratic Union, becoming a candidate on the 2007 parliamentary election and won a seat in the parliament. Škoro took office on 11 January 2008, but resigned in November 2008 due to his disappointment over the way politicians were treated by Croatian media.

On 23 June 2019, Škoro announced his candidacy in the 2019–20 Croatian presidential election. In a video message on his Facebook page, Škoro said that changes to the Constitution are needed and that the president should have more powers. He came in third place with 24.45% of the vote and was eliminated from the second round. His campaign was supported by HKS, Hrast and Most.

On 29 February 2020, Škoro reported to the media the establishment of the new right-wing political party, the Miroslav Škoro Homeland Movement, four and a half months before the 2020 parliamentary election.

In March 2021, Škoro announced his candidacy for mayor in the 2021 Zagreb local elections. He lost in the second round, gaining 34% of the vote, Tomislav Tomašević winning with 64%.

== Discography ==
- Ne dirajte mi ravnicu (1992)
- Miroslav Škoro i Ravnica (1993)
- Sitan vez (1996)
- Miroslav Škoro, uživo (1998)
- Ptica samica (1999)
- Slagalica (2001)
- Milo moje (2003)
- Svetinja (2005)
- Sve najbolje (2007)
- Moje boje (2008)
- Čudnovate pjesmice o moru i lavoru (2013)
- Putujem sam (2014)
- Hrvatski Božić (2015)
