= Homeland Movement (Croatia) =

Croatian political party

Homeland Movement Domovinski pokret
- Abbreviation: DP
- President: Ivan Penava
- Deputy President: Stipo Mlinarić
- Secretary-General: Mladen Barać
- Founder: Miroslav Škoro
- Founded: 29 February 2020; 6 years ago
- Split from: Croatian Democratic Union
- Headquarters: Vlaška ulica 81F, Zagreb
- Membership (2022): 8,434
- Ideology: Croatian nationalism; National conservatism; Social conservatism; Right-wing populism; Soft Euroscepticism
- Political position: Right-wing to far-right
- European Parliament group: European Conservatives and Reformists Group (2024)
- Colours: Grey (customary); Red; White; Blue
- Slogan: Ustani i ostani! ("Get up and stay!")
- Sabor: 8 / 151
- European Parliament: 0 / 12
- County Prefects: 0 / 21
- Mayors: 1 / 128
- Municipalities: 0 / 428

Website
- dp.hr

The Homeland Movement (Croatian: Domovinski pokret; abbr. DP), previously known as Miroslav Škoro Homeland Movement (Croatian: Domovinski pokret Miroslava Škore; abbr. DPMŠ) until February 2021, is a nationalist and right-wing populist political party in Croatia. The DP was founded by Croatian singer, former Croatian Democratic Union MP, and 2019–20 presidential election candidate, Miroslav Škoro, on 29 February 2020.

== History ==
On 29 February 2020, Miroslav Škoro, a former MP who stood in the recent presidential election, confirmed to the media the formation of a new party, four and a half months before the parliamentary elections. The DP tried to form a broad right-of-centre coalition for the upcoming election. They negotiated with the Bridge, but no agreement was reached.

A coalition was formed with several other parties, including the conservative Croatian Sovereignists, which was established to contest the 2019 European elections, and the newly founded Bloc for Croatia. A coalition agreement was also signed with the Green List, emphasizing "environmental protection and the fight against climate change".

On 20 July 2021, Miroslav Škoro resigned as party president over a dispute over party finances. This was soon followed by disciplinary proceedings against Škoro and his sister, Vesna Vučemilović. This is reportedly why they left the party. On 9 October 2021, Mayor of Vukovar, Ivan Penava was elected the new party president.

In the 2024 Croatian parliamentary election, the DP led a coalition with Law and Justice and two independent members of the Sabor won 14 seats, becoming the third largest faction. The ruling Croatian Democratic Union (HDZ)'s coalition only earned 61 seats, needing 76 to form a government. As such, the DP was courted by both the HDZ, and the main opposition, the Social Democratic Party (SDP) and Rivers of Justice coalition led by Zoran Milanović who attempted to form a broad "national salvation" government of every party against the HDZ. As such the party has been described as the kingmaker, as whichever coalition they join, the HDZ or SDP, would earn enough seats to form a government. However, on 27 April, after having coalition negotiations with both parties, the HDZ Prime Minister Andrej Plenković announced that the DP would be joining their coalition "in the coming days."

=== 2024 Internal party elections ===
The second internal party elections were expected at the beginning of 2025, but the current president Ivan Penava made a decision at the end of July that the Electoral Parliament will be held on 31 August 2024. Since then, there has been an open conflict in the party between two currents, the first led by party president Ivan Penava and the second, led by Deputy President Mario Radić, who is outraged by the date of the elections, but above all by the manner in which they are conducted. Criticism of the method of election of the Electoral Parliament was directed by representative and president of the Zagreb branch, Igor Peternel, considering the method of election undemocratic because branches inclined to Penava received a larger number of delegates. For example, the will of the members of the Zagreb branch will be represented by five delegates, four from Osijek-Baranja will participate, and the Vukovar-Srijem branch will have as many as nine delegates. Stipo Mlinarić ran for Penava's deputy, and Igor Peternel for Radić. Harsh words, accusations, and even criminal charges have been pouring in from both camps for the past month, which, many warn, could lead to a split in the party. In addition to objections to the determination of quotas, Radić's camp also fears manipulation of votes during the elections and the bias of electoral commission members because, they point out, they participated in the campaign for Penava. Penava has support of all three DP ministers in government and nine out od eleven MP's

After only 20 minutes of the Electoral Session, Mario Radić, together with Peternel and other supporters, left the hall after there was a disagreement about the voting method. Radić demanded a secret ballot and that people who support him also sit in the election commission, in order to prevent possible theft of votes. However, Penava, who had most of his people in the commission, proposed that the vote be public by a show of hands. As Penava's proposal passed, Radić and the people around him demonstratively left the session. There were 64 delegates left at the session, who then unanimously elected Ivan Penava as president and Stipo Mlinarić as deputy president of the party.

At the end of the election process, several members of the party who supported Radić publicly stepped forward and announced their departure from the DP, including Stephen Nikola Bartulica, MEP and Željko Pervan, who posted a video on Facebook in which he cut his membership card.

== Political positions ==
The DP is variously considered conservative, right-wing populist and nationalist. The party competed in the 2020 Croatian parliamentary election in a coalition with several other minor right-wing to far-right parties, including the Croatian Conservative Party, Croatian Growth and Bloc for Croatia. It is also a vocal opponent of We can! and the Independent Democratic Serb Party.

The party is in favour of the European Union and the Schengen Area but was opposed to the euro. The party is also against abortion and same-sex marriage. During 2022, the party expressed support for Ukraine, but was opposed to allowing military training of the Armed Forces of Ukraine in Croatia.

In December 2025, Homeland Movement's Youth started an on-line petition to "remove gay prides and antifa marches from the centers of Croatian cities." Their petition stated: “Since a radically left-wing petition aims to remove prayer groups from public squares in Croatian city centers, we believe the same should apply to all leftist and ‘human-rights’ gatherings, because the Republic of Croatia guarantees an equal level of rights to all its citizens.”

== List of presidents ==
#	President		Term start	Term end
1	Miroslav Škoro	Official portrait of Tomislav Nikolić from 2012	29 February 2020	20 July 2021
–	Mario Radić (acting)	Official portrait of Miloš Vučević from 2022	20 July 2021	9 October 2021
2	Ivan Penava	Official portrait of Miloš Vučević from 2022	9 October 2021	Incumbent

== Election results ==
=== Presidential ===
Election	Candidate	1st round		2nd round		Result
Election	Candidate	Votes	%	Votes	%	Result
2024–25	end. Dragan Primorac (Ind.)	314,663	19.35 (#2)	380,752	25.32 (#2)	Lost

=== Legislative ===
Election	Leader	Coalition	Votes	%	Seats	+/–	Government
Election	Leader	Coalition	Coalition		DP		Government
2020	Miroslav Škoro	HS–HKS–HRAST–BzH–ZL–SU	181,492	10.89%	11 / 151	New	Opposition
2024	Ivan Penava	PiP–BzH–ZL	202,714	9.56%	11 / 151	0	Coalition

=== European Parliament ===
Election	List leader	Coalition	Votes	%	Seats	+/–	EP Group
Election	List leader	Coalition	Coalition		DP		EP Group
2024	Ivan Penava	None	66,541	8.84 (#3)	1 / 12	New	ECR
