= 2000 Zagreb local elections =

Croatian local elections

- 7 May 2000

All 50 seats to the Zagreb Assembly 26 seats needed for a majority
- Turnout: 33.7% ▼33.91 pp
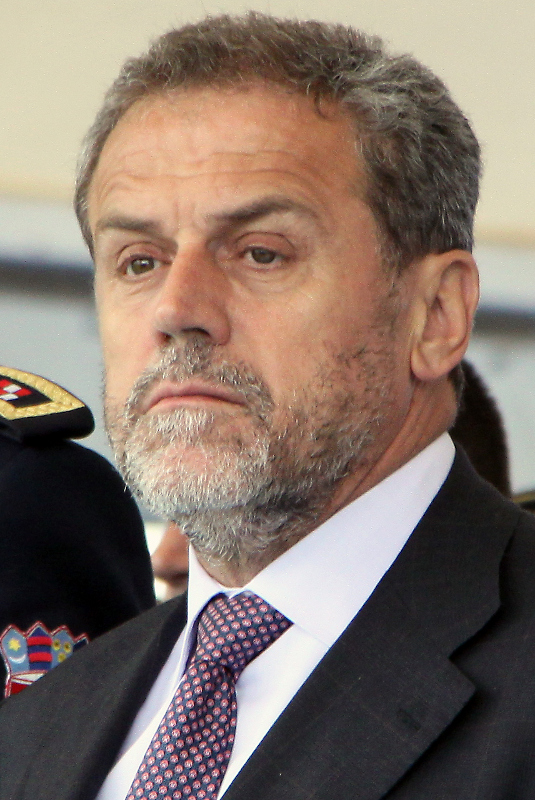

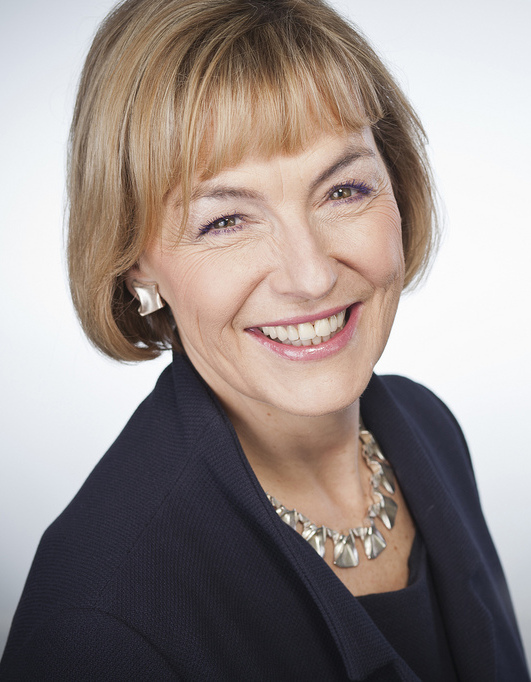

	First party	Second party	Third party
Candidate	Milan Bandić	Vesna Pusić	Dražen Budiša
Party	SDP–HSU	HNS	HSLS
Seats won	15 / 50	9 / 50	10 / 50
Seat change	▲1	▲9	▲1
Popular vote	48,146	43,592	33,989
Percentage	20.98%	19%	14.81%
Swing	▼2.93 pp	▲15.27 pp	▲4.24 pp
	Fourth party	Fifth party
Candidate	Silvije Degen	Davorin Tepeš
Party	ASH–LS	HDZ
Seats won	6 / 50	5 / 50
Seat change	▲6	▼19
Popular vote	28,804	26,619
Percentage	12.55%	11.6%
Swing	▲7.79 pp	▼23.32 pp
Mayor before election
Josip Kregar (acting)
Independent
Elected mayor
Milan Bandić
SDP

Elections were held in Zagreb on 7 May 2000 for members of the Zagreb Assembly. The elections were called after the Croatian Democratic Union (HDZ) lost the majority in the Assembly, and the Croatian Government dismissed it and appointed an acting mayor.

In a record low turnout, the Zagreb Alternative coalition, led by the Social Democratic Party (SDP) and the Croatian Social Liberal Party (HSLS), won a majority of seats in the Assembly. The HNS was the biggest surprise in the election and won nine seats, while the HDZ suffered a heavy defeat and gained only five seats. Milan Bandić, who led the list of the SDP, was elected mayor by the Zagreb Assembly on 31 May.

== Background ==
In the 2000 Croatian parliamentary election, a coalition led by the two major Croatian opposition parties, the Social Democratic Party of Croatia (SDP) and the Croatian Social Liberal Party (HSLS), won the majority in the Croatian Parliament and defeated the ruling Croatian Democratic Union (HDZ), which was in power since 1990. Milan Bandić, the leader of the SDP's Zagreb branch, said that they will "not wait for the local elections in 2001 to take over power in Zagreb", where the HDZ held the majority since the 1997 local elections and the end of the Zagreb Crisis. Bandić collected the resignations of all 24 members of the opposition parties in the Zagreb Assembly, as well as from two HDZ members. The new Croatian Government immediately dismissed the Zagreb Assembly and appointed Josip Kregar as the acting mayor, in place of incumbent HDZ's Marina Matulović-Dropulić. Though the two HDZ members later withdrew their resignations, Kregar said that it was "too late".

On 11 March, the HDZ's Zagreb branch appointed Davorin Tepeš as its president, replacing the dismissed Zlatko Canjuga. Kregar formally became the acting mayor on 13 March, and snap elections were called for 7 May.

The SDP and the HSLS participated in the elections in a coalition with the Croatian Peasant Party (HSS), the Social Democratic Action of Croatia (ASH), the Liberal Party (LS), and the Croatian Party of Pensioners (HSU). The coalition's name was Zagreb Alternative.

== Results ==
38 members of the Zagreb Assembly were elected proportionally using the D'Hondt method, and 12 were elected in 12 electoral districts by a majority system. The Zagreb Alternative coalition won all 12 seats in the electoral districts. Along with the proportional system, the SDP won a total of 15 seats, the HSLS won 10 seats, the HNS 9 seats, the ASH–LS coalition six seats, the HDZ five, the Democratic Centre (DC) three, and the HSS two.

The turnout of around 33% was unexpectedly low, compared to more than 67% in the previous elections. While the SDP and HSLS-led Zagreb Alternative secured a majority in the Assembly, they won an average of 15% fewer votes in Zagreb compared to the parliamentary election in January. The strong performance of the HNS, by winning slightly fewer votes than the SDP and much more than the HSLS, was the biggest surprise in the elections. The HDZ gained only five seats, but won more votes than the polls before the elections predicted.

On 31 May, the Assembly elected Bandić as the new mayor, and Darinko Kosor (HSLS) and Mladen Vilfan (LS) as his deputies. Franjo Zenko (HSLS) became the president of the Assembly.

=== Assembly election ===
Parties and coalitions	Popular vote			Seats			
Parties and coalitions	Votes	%	±pp	D'Hondt	Majority	Total	+/−
Social Democratic Party of Croatia (SDP); Croatian Party of Pensioners (HSU)	48,146	20.98%	–2.93	9	6	15	+1
Croatian People's Party (HNS)	43,592	19%	+15.27	9	0	9	+9
Croatian Social Liberal Party (HSLS)	33,989	14.81%	+4.24	7	3	10	+1
Social Democratic Action of Croatia (ASH); Liberal Party (LS)	28,804	12.55%	+7.79	5	1	6	+6
Croatian Democratic Union (HDZ)	26,619	11.6%	–23.32	5	0	5	–19
Democratic Centre (DC)	15,532	6.77%	New	3	0	3	New
Other lists				0	2	2	–1
Total:	232,099			38	12	50	
Invalid votes:	N/A	N/A					
Turnout:	232,099	33.7%	–33.91				
Registered voters:	688,996						
Source: City Election Committee

Popular vote
SDP–HSU	20.98%
HNS	19%
HSLS	14.81%
ASH–LS	12.55%
HDZ	11.6%
DC	6.77%

Seat totals
SDP–HSU	30%
HSLS	20%
HNS	18%
ASH–LS	12%
HDZ	10%
DC	6%
HSS	4%

== See also ==
- List of mayors of Zagreb
