= Zagreb crisis =

1995 political crisis in Croatia

The Zagreb crisis (Croatian: Zagrebačka kriza) is the political crisis that followed the elections for the City of Zagreb local assembly held in October 1995. During the crisis the winning parties were unable to appoint their candidate for the Mayor of Zagreb because President of Croatia Franjo Tuđman refused to provide the formal confirmation of their decision.

A centre-left coalition of winning parties continued to hold majority in the local assembly during the crisis and continued to suggest other candidates, but they were all eventually turned down by the President as Croatian law at the time required a formal Presidential confirmation of the appointment. Meanwhile, the city was run by the government-appointed acting mayor, which meant that the city de facto had two parallel administrations. The situation led to several huge protests and was not resolved until the next local elections in April 1997 after which two opposition members of the assembly switched to Tuđman's Croatian Democratic Union (HDZ) party. This meant that HDZ finally succeeded in gaining the majority in the 50-seat assembly, which enabled the party to appoint their mayor, who was afterwards approved by Tuđman.

== Background ==
The crisis had its origin in the factional struggle within the ruling party of Croatia at the time, the Croatian Democratic Union (HDZ). In 1993, the former Prime Minister Josip Manolić, head of security services and leader of HDZ party moderates gradually fell out of favour with President Franjo Tuđman, who became increasingly aligned with extreme nationalists led by Minister of Defence Gojko Šušak. In the spring of 1994, when it became apparent that Manolić would lose his post of Speaker of the Chamber of Counties (the short-lived upper house body in the Croatian Parliament), him and Stjepan Mesić, who was at the time Speaker of the Parliament, organized a mass defection of HDZ members of parliament who formed a new party called Croatian Independent Democrats (HND), hoping to strip Tuđman of majority in the parliament. The attempt ultimately failed and Tuđman's party eventually managed to maintain power on the national level. However, in a number of local and regional assemblies the defection of HDZ members allowed opposition parties to gain majorities.

One of these was the Zagreb County Assembly. For Tuđman, this apparently represented an embarrassing setback that he had to revert in any way possible. He initiated legislation aimed at merging the two county-level administrative units (the Zagreb County and City of Zagreb) which would then require a new election for the enlarged assembly. The idea was to drown the opposition-controlled Zagreb County assembly with votes from the City of Zagreb constituency, which was at the time widely perceived as a solid HDZ stronghold.

== 1995 election ==
The new law was passed and the date for the new by-election was called for 29 October 1995, coinciding with the next parliamentary election. It was believed that the widespread euphoria following the August 1995 Operation Storm and Croatian military success in the last stages of the still ongoing Bosnian War, together with a massive propaganda drive supported by the state-controlled media, would lead to Tuđman's party comfortably winning majority in the new municipal assembly.

Although the first election results had shown HDZ gaining ground in rural areas of the former Zagreb County, opposition parties managed to achieve success in urban areas of Zagreb proper. This was very apparent in the blue-collar neighborhoods which switched support from HDZ to the centre-left Social Democratic Party (SDP), mainly due to the populist rhetoric of Zdravko Tomac and organizational abilities of Milan Bandić, prominent SDP members at the time. As a result, HDZ eventually lost the elections for the new Zagreb assembly, and Zdravko Tomac became the new Speaker of the Assembly.

Soon afterwards, opposition parties formed a governing coalition which elected Goran Granić, a member of the Croatian Social Liberal Party (HSLS), for mayor.

== The crisis ==
Croatian legislation at the time stipulated that the mayor of Zagreb had the status equal to a county prefect (župan), and as such his appointment had to be confirmed by the President of Croatia. This was seen as a mere formality, because Tuđman had already made a precedent by confirming opposition prefects following the disastrous defeat of his party in the February 1993 local elections in the Istria County.

However, Tuđman surprised many by saying he would not allow an "opposition situation" in the Croatian capital. Commenting in February 1996 on the outcome of the election, he stated the following:

"What does it mean that the opposition has 60% of the vote? It is as if a farmer told you that he had 60 animals in his manor. Are those pigs or calves? Are those chicken or geese? Whereas every sensible farmer and man would know that, compared to such a flock, a single stud, let alone a pair of studs or cows, is worth more than an entire flock."

Tuđman refused to confirm the appointment of an opposition mayor, and the Croatian Government appointed a former city administration official and HDZ member Marina Matulović-Dropulić as interim mayor. This caused a stalemate as Zagreb municipal assembly refused to acknowledge Matulović-Dropulić as mayor, but with Tuđman's apparent refusal to confirm an opposition candidate, they were unable to appoint their own. Throughout the following 18 months, three other opposition candidates from HSLS ranks (Jozo Radoš, Ivo Škrabalo and Dražen Budiša) had been proposed by the municipal assembly, only to be denied the required presidential confirmation every time. A plan to appoint Ante Ledić, a businessman with strong links to HDZ, which was seen as a compromise solution, also failed. In the meantime, Matulović-Dropulić continued to run city affairs.

== Protests and resolution ==
The spectacle of the nation's capital having two administrations not recognizing each other and the country's leader refusing to acknowledge the will of the voters led many to believe that Croatia had experienced a dramatic drop in democratic standards during the war, and that this state of affairs would not be resolved as long as Tuđman remained in power. Increasingly paranoid remarks made by Tuđman in public, who began to describing his political opponents and their supporters as "foreign agents" and "enemies of the state" also contributed to that assessment.

In November 1996, more than a year after the elections, and with the crisis still going on, the Croatian Government decided not to renew the broadcast license for Radio 101, a popular local radio station known for vocal criticism of the ruling regime, and decided to award the license to Ninoslav Pavić, a media tycoon widely perceived to be rather tolerant to the regime, instead. The announcement of the decision sparked a mass protest which saw about 120,000 people gathered at the Ban Jelačić Square on 21 November 1996 in the biggest demonstrations in Croatia's modern history.

Although the immediate cause for the protest had been the desire to preserve a popular symbol of the city, many protesters used the rally as an opportunity to express disagreement with Tuđman and his authoritarian policies. At the same time, Tuđman was out of the country undergoing stomach cancer treatment at the Walter Reed Hospital in Washington. Upon hearing what was going on, Tuđman reportedly ordered the police to take action against protesters. The then-Minister of the Interior Ivan Jarnjak reportedly refused to do so, which resulted in his resignation in mid-December. Following the protests, Radio 101 managed to retain its independence and broadcast license as the Government's original decision was revoked. Upon returning to Croatia, Tuđman made statements attacking the protests, calling his opponents "green and yellow devils" and accusing them of being foreign mercenaries and traitors who sold out.

The regular City of Zagreb local elections were then held in April 1997. This time the opposition parties did not form a coalition and decided to run on separate tickets, allowing HDZ to win 24 out of 50 seats. When two representatives of the centre-right Croatian Peasant Party (HSS) switched to HDZ in exchange for lucrative government posts in the immediate aftermath of the election, HDZ finally gained an absolute majority in the municipal assembly. This enabled the party to legally appoint Marina Matulović-Dropulić as mayor, who was then confirmed by Tuđman. This formally ended the crisis.

However, in 1998 a mass rally was organised once again at the city's main square, this time by workers' unions. This time the reason for the rally was a drastic drop in the standard of living. The police, however, refused to issue the required permit for the gathering to take place, and police forces cordoned off the square to prevent protesters from reaching it. For several hours, angry citizens attempted to push back the police cordons, but were unsuccessful. The media attention focused on the event, further promoting the idea that Tuđman's rule was becoming increasingly authoritarian. Tuđman commented on all of these events yet again, by calling the people involved in them "small-time cattle" ("stoka sitnog zuba").

In spite of the crisis' formal resolution in 1997, most citizens of Zagreb and large parts of the Croatian public refused to acknowledge the new administration, considering the crisis an ongoing event. In May 2000, four months after the parliamentary election in January in which HDZ had lost power at the national level, the new centre-left government of Ivica Račan called for a special local by-election in Zagreb, which ultimately resulted in SDP's landslide victory and SDP's Milan Bandić becoming mayor.

== See also ==
- List of mayors of Zagreb
