= 1927 Zagreb local elections =

Elections in Zagreb, Croatia

- 4 September 1927

50 seats to the Zagreb City Assembly
- Turnout: 57.70%
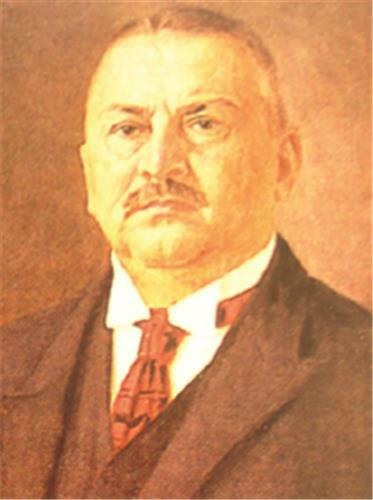

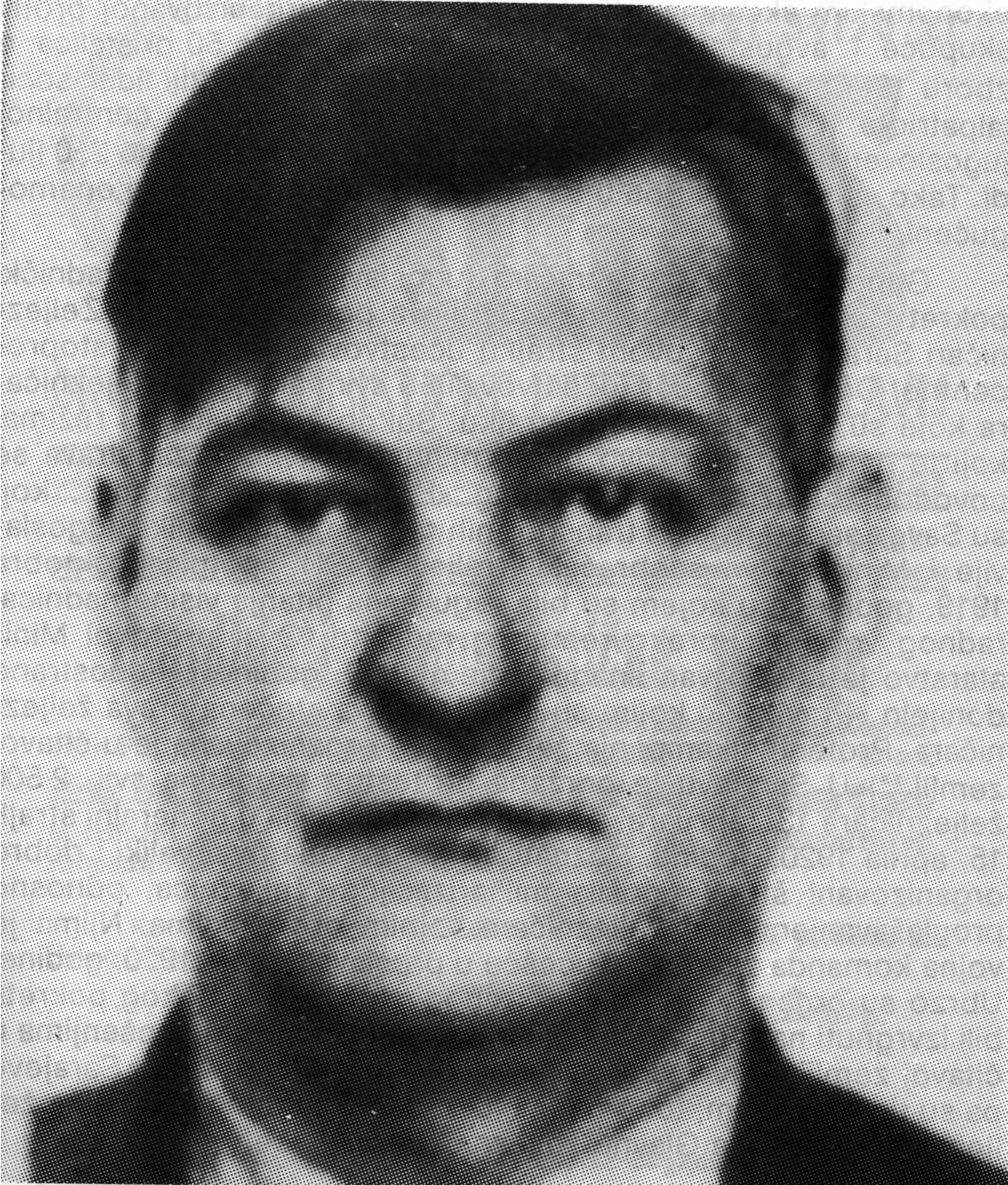
	First party	Second party
Candidate	Vjekoslav Heinzel	Ivan Krndelj
Party	Croatian Bloc	Republican Alliance of Workers and Peasants
Seats won	25 / 50	7 / 50
Popular vote	9,749	2,456
Percentage	49.99%	12.59%
Mayor before election
Vjekoslav Heinzel
Croatian Bloc
Elected mayor
Vjekoslav Heinzel
Croatian Bloc

The 1927 local elections in Zagreb were held on 4 September, 7 days before the parliamentary elections. The Croatian Bloc coalition won a majority in the City Assembly and reelected Vjekoslav Heinzel as mayor.

== Results ==
Political party	Votes	%	Seats	%
Croatian Bloc; Hrvatski blok	9,749	49.99%	25	50%
Republican Alliance of Workers and Peasants; Republikanski savez radnika i seljaka	2,456	12.59%	7	14%
Croatian Peasant Party; Hrvatska seljačka stranka	2,322	11.91%	6	12%
Independent Democratic Party; Samostalna demokratska stranka	1,531	7.85%	4	8%
Jew Party; Židovska stranka	806	4.13%	3	6%
Tenants Bloc; Stanarski blok	759	3.89%	2	4%
Democratic Party; Demokratska stranka	403	2.06%	2	4%
Socialist Party of Yugoslavia; Socijalistička partija Jugoslavije	384	1.96%	1	2%
People's Radical Party; Narodna radikalna stranka	373	1.97%	0	0%
Zagreb Social Alliance; Zagrebački socijalni savez	284	1.46%	0	0%
Social Commercial Bloc; Socijalni privredni blok	268	1.37%	0	0%
Croatian Independent Dealers; Hrvatski nezavisni obrtnici	155	0.79%	0	0%
Total	19,500	100%	50	100%
Registered Voters/Turnout	33,796	57.70%		

The Croatian Bloc, a coalition consisting of the Croatian Federalist Peasant Party and Croatian Party of Rights, won 50% of the votes and 25 seats in the City Assembly. The Republican Alliance of Workers and Peasants, a party list formed by the banned Communist Party, came second with 12.59% of the votes. Vjekoslav Heinzel was reelected mayor in his last term. The 1927 local elections were the last ones before the 6 January Dictatorship when King Alexander I banned all political parties.

== Election posters ==
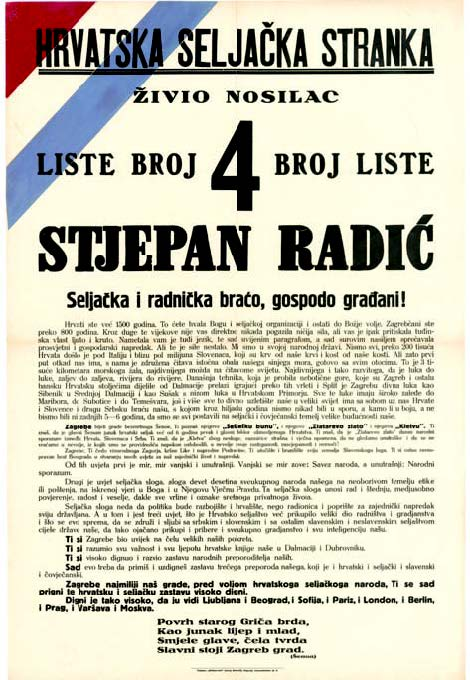
Croatian Peasant Party poster

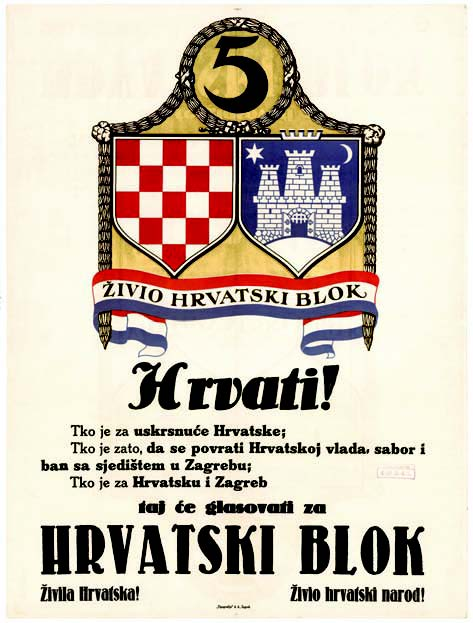
Croatian Bloc poster

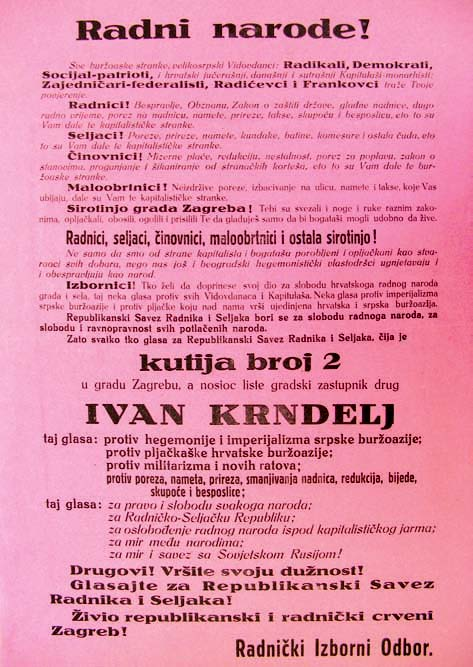
Republican Alliance of Workers and Peasants poster

== See also ==
- List of mayors of Zagreb
- 1927 Kingdom of Serbs, Croats and Slovenes parliamentary election
