= 1921 Zagreb local elections =

Local election results in Croatia

- 11 December 1921

50 seats to the Zagreb City Assembly
- Turnout: 75.52%
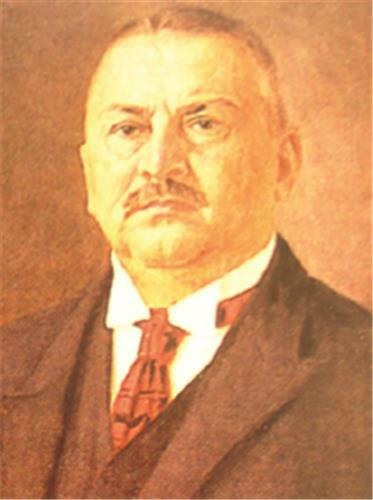
	First party	Second party
Candidate	Vjekoslav Heinzel	Milan Krešić
Party	Croatian Bloc	Democratic Party
Seats won	36 / 50	6 / 50
Seat change	▼5	▲1
Popular vote	15,297	2,546
Percentage	70.16%	11.68%
Mayor before election
Vjekoslav Heinzel
Croatian Union
Elected mayor
Vjekoslav Heinzel
Croatian Bloc

Local elections for the Zagreb City Assembly were held on 11 December 1921. These were the third elections in Zagreb since the formation of the Kingdom of Serbs, Croats and Slovenes. The Croatian Bloc won a majority and incumbent mayor Vjekoslav Heinzel was reelected as mayor of Zagreb.

== Results ==
Political party	Votes	%	Seats	%
Croatian Bloc; Hrvatski blok	15,297	70.16%	36	72%
Democratic Party; Demokratska stranka	2,546	11.68%	6	12%
Communist Party of Yugoslavia; Komunistička partija Jugoslavije	1,074	4.93%	2	4%
People's Socialist Party; Narodna socijalistička stranka	819	3.76%	2	4%
Jew Party; Židovska stranka	691	3.17%	2	4%
Social Democratic Party; Socijaldemokratska stranka	454	2.08%	1	2%
Croatian Popular Party; Hrvatska pučka stranka	366	1.68%	1	2%
People's Radical Party; Narodna radikalna stranka	110	0.5%	0	0%
Total	21,804	100%	50	100%
Registered Voters/Turnout	28,872	75.52%		

== Mayoral elections ==
The Croatian Bloc, a coalition formed by the Croatian People's Peasant Party, Croatian Union and the Croatian Party of Rights, won the majority of votes. Vjekoslav Heinzel was reelected as mayor.

== See also ==
- List of mayors of Zagreb
