= 1920 Zagreb local elections =

1920 Zagreb local elections may refer to:

- March 1920 Zagreb local elections, won by Svetozar Delić against the incumbent Stjepan Srkulj
- June 1920 Zagreb local elections, won by Vjekoslav Heinzel
