= Jasen Mesić =

Croatian politician (born 1972)

Minister of Culture
- In office 27 December 2010 – 23 December 2011
- Prime Minister: Jadranka Kosor
- Preceded by: Božo Biškupić
- Succeeded by: Andrea Zlatar-Violić

Personal details
- Born: 11 June 1972 (age 54) Zagreb, SR Croatia, SFR Yugoslavia
- Party: Croatian Democratic Union
- Spouse: Barbara Medved-Mesić (2014-)
- Children: Marko Gabrijel
- Education: University of Zagreb

Jasen Mesić (born June 11, 1972) is a Croatian politician from the Croatian Democratic Union. He served as the Croatian Minister of Culture between 2010 and 2011.

Mesić was born in Zagreb. He graduated in history and archeology at the Faculty of Humanities and Social Sciences of the University of Zagreb in 1996 and later in submarine archeology at Accademia per metodologia e tecnica di archeologia subacquea in Italy. Subsequently, he attained his master's degree at the University of Siena.

Jasen Mesić was the mayoral candidate of Croatian Democratic Union for the 2009 local elections in Zagreb. He received 39,623 votes or 13.17% and was eliminated in the first round.
