= Grič Tunnel =

Grič Tunnel may refer to:

- Grič Tunnel (Zagreb), a pedestrian tunnel under the historic core of Zagreb, Croatia
- Grič Tunnel (roadway), a road tunnel, part of the A1 motorway in Croatia
