= Svetozar Delić =

Croatian politician (1885–1967)

- A photo of Svetozar Delić

Mayor of Zagreb
- In office 16 April 1920 – 22 April 1920
- Preceded by: Stjepan Srkulj
- Succeeded by: Dragutin Tončić

Personal details
- Born: 31 August 1885 Petrinja, Croatia-Slavonia, Austria-Hungary
- Died: 25 October 1967 (aged 82) Samobor, SR Croatia, SFR Yugoslavia
- Party: Socialist Workers' Party of Yugoslavia, SRPJ(k)
- Spouse: Paulina Wallner

Svetozar Delić (31 August 1885 – 25 October 1967) was a Croatian politician and revolutionary who briefly served as the first communist mayor of Zagreb, Croatia. Although he is known for his work in the early Yugoslav communist organization "Napred," Delić is mostly recognized for being the mayor with the shortest term in the history of Zagreb. His term lasted only three days before Delić was fired and another three days before he was expelled from city hall.

== Personal life ==
Svetozar Delić was born in Petrinja (then part of Austro-Hungary) to Tomo and Franciska Delić née Hula. He attended a realschule in Zagreb and graduated in 1905. He was not accepted to the University of Vienna so he became a clerk at the Zagreb County Workers' Insurance Fund. This job motivated him to become a communist as he noticed the social stratification in favor of the wealthy.

Delić was married on 11 May 1913 to Paulina Wallner, an Evangelical Catholic from Austria. He had two children, one of whom, Dr. Svetozar Delić, fought in World War II for the Yugoslav Partisans.

== Work in "Napred" ==
Upon becoming a resident of Zagreb in 1910, Delić, together with Josip Cimermančić, became involved in the work of the recently formed communist organization, "Napred," becoming one of its first 50 members. During this time, the organization started to flourish and became more involved in Zagreb politics, increasing the number of its members 18-fold and its financial capital by almost 200 times between 1914 and 1919. This advance is astonishing, because it occurred during World War I in an area heavily influenced by famine, bombardment, and other war-time problems. Delić rose to a high-ranking position in the organization, becoming heavily involved in its marketing in the Zagreb newspapers Novosti and Sloboda to attract new members. He also took loans to increase the stability and capital of the organization. Contrary to the trend toward recession then present in the aftermath of the war, organization "Napred" had bought over 36 million krones worth of various products.

== The three-day mayor ==
On 21 March 1920, city council elections were held. The emerging Socialist Workers' Party of Yugoslavia (communists), SRPJ(k) (renamed the very next year to become the Communist Party of Yugoslavia), attracted votes all over Croatia and the rest of Yugoslavia. In Zagreb the party received 7,011 out of 17,852 votes cast. Although the voters constituted less than a sixth of Zagreb's population, SRPJ(k) won 20 seats in the city council and was entitled to elect the city mayor. A large crowd of more than 50,000 people from Zagreb and its surroundings gathered on the Ban Jelačić Square and Saint Mark's Square to find out the result of the elections and later celebrate the win of SRPJ(k).

The next day, Svetozar Delić was chosen as president of the SRPJ(k) delegates in the city council. Two weeks later, in early April, Delić gave a speech directed against the opponents of communism, accusing them of restricting the freedoms of the general population. The mayoral elections were conducted on 16 April 1920 by the two-round voting system. Svetozar Delić and Stjepan Srkulj, the mayor whose term just ended, each failed to get more than 50%, but managed to get into the second round. The second round was won by Delić with 27 votes against Srkulj's 14.

The ruling Serbian Karađorđević dynasty perceived rising communism and the elections of numerous communist mayors such as Delić all over the country as a threat to the monarchy and ordered measures to be taken to prevent them from gaining influence in politics. The following day, on 17 April, the ban Matko Laginja barred all public and city hall meetings according to an old 1875 law. At 9 a.m. on 18 April, Delić received a phone call from the ban's advisor Dragutin Tončić, relieving him of his duty and disbanding the city council. Delić requested a written notification in an attempt to make his term longer, although his fate was already sealed. Later that day the Regional Government sent Delić a written notice of Tončić's takeover. Delić refused to cooperate.

=== Termination ===
The next day, Delić was relieved of duties and his pay was suspended. A criminal procedure was started against him and other SRPJ(k) delegates, but that did not convince him to leave the city hall. His first act that day was to notify other delegates of the dismissal of the scheduled 22 April meeting, which was supposed to be the first meeting of the newly formed city council. However, Delić later rescheduled and held the meeting on 22 April. The meeting was held under a siege by gendarmerie and army troops surrounding the building, as Delić locked himself and 27 present councilmen inside, trying to perform mayoral duties while under suspension. The quorum was confirmed to be met and the minutes were signed, but nothing else could have been accomplished before officer Vragović and his 30 men broke into the city hall and arrested Delić and all attending councilmen. Even at six days, Delić's term is the shortest term in the history of Zagreb mayors.

On the following day, 23 April, public protests were held to convince the government to return Delić, but they failed and Dragutin Tončić became the new mayor. A few months later, Tončić yielded power to a new, politically neutral, mayor, Vjekoslav Heinzel, who would retain office for the following eight years.

In 1923 Delić left politics. He died in Samobor.

== See also ==
- Obznana, the 1920 decree that led to the ban of the Communist party of Yugoslavia

== Sources ==
- Kolar-Dimitrijević, Mira (1984). "Svetozar Delić, komunistički gradonačelnik Zagreba 1920. godine". In Buntak, Franjo; et al. (eds.). Iz starog i novog Zagreba (in Croatian). Vol. VI. Izdanja Muzeja grada Zagreba. pp. 223–234.
- Milčec, Zvonimir (1993). Zagrebački gradonačelnici (in Croatian). Alfa. ISBN 953-168-010-8.

Preceded by Stjepan Srkulj	Mayor of Zagreb; 1920	Succeeded by Dragutin Tončić
