= Matulović =

Matulović (Serbian Cyrillic: Матуловић) is a Serbo-Croatian surname, a patronymic derived from the archaic Slavic given name Matul. It may refer to:

- Marina Matulović-Dropulić (born 1942), Croatian politician
- Milan Matulović, Serbian chess player
