= Rijeka Tunnel =

Pedestrian tunnel in Rijeka, Croatia

- Interactive map of Rijeka Tunnel

Overview
- Coordinates: 45°19′40″N 14°26′39″E

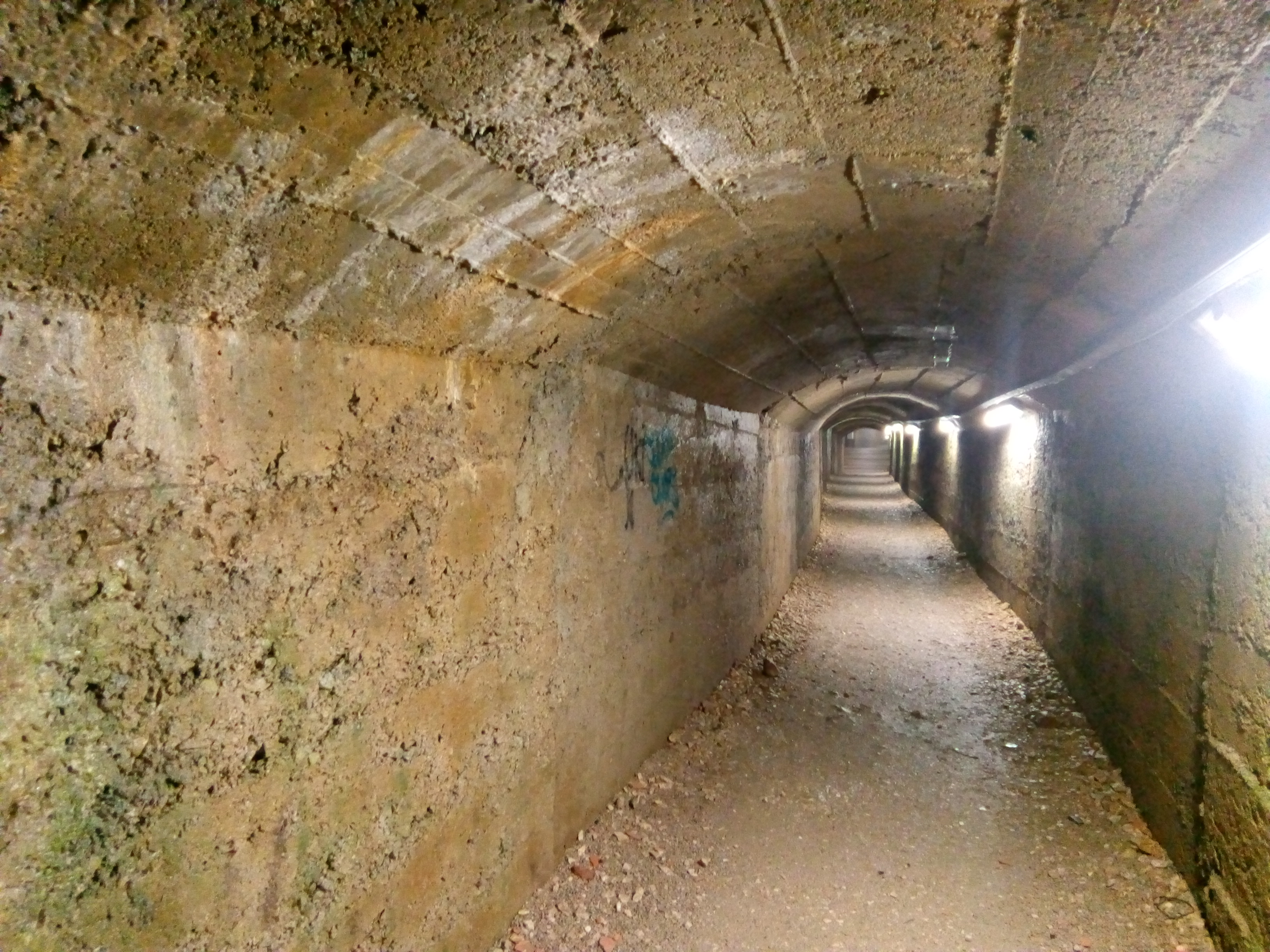
Inside the tunnel

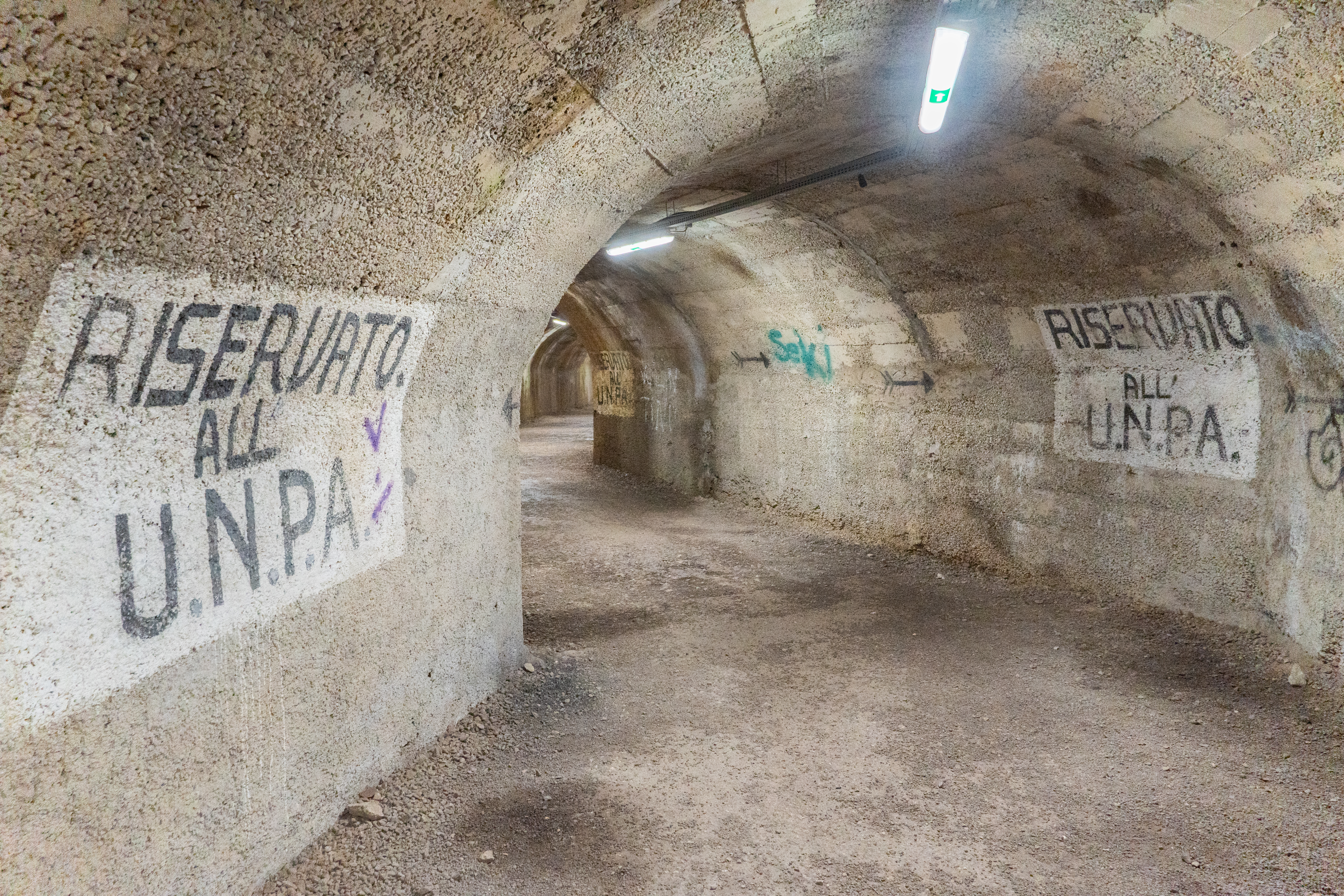
Riservato all U.N.P.A.

The Rijeka Tunnel (Croatian: Riječki tunel), also called TunelRi, is a pedestrian tunnel located in the city centre of Rijeka, Croatia. The tunnel spans 350 metres (1,150 ft) from St. Vitus Cathedral to Dolac Primary School in Old Town. It was originally built from 1939 to 1942 by the Italian military in order to protect civilians from Allied aerial bombings during World War II. In several places along the tunnel, one can still see the original "Riservato all U.N.P.A." ("Reserved for the Anti-aircraft Corps") signs.

After being closed for 75 years, the tunnel was remodelled and opened to the public in 2017, serving as a tourist attraction and public passage. The tunnel has an entrance fee of 1,5€ (from October to March) or 2€ (from April to September) and is open for public access every weekday from 9 a.m. to 5 p.m.

== See also ==
- Grič Tunnel
