= Grič Tunnel (Zagreb) =

Pedestrian tunnel in Zagreb, Croatia

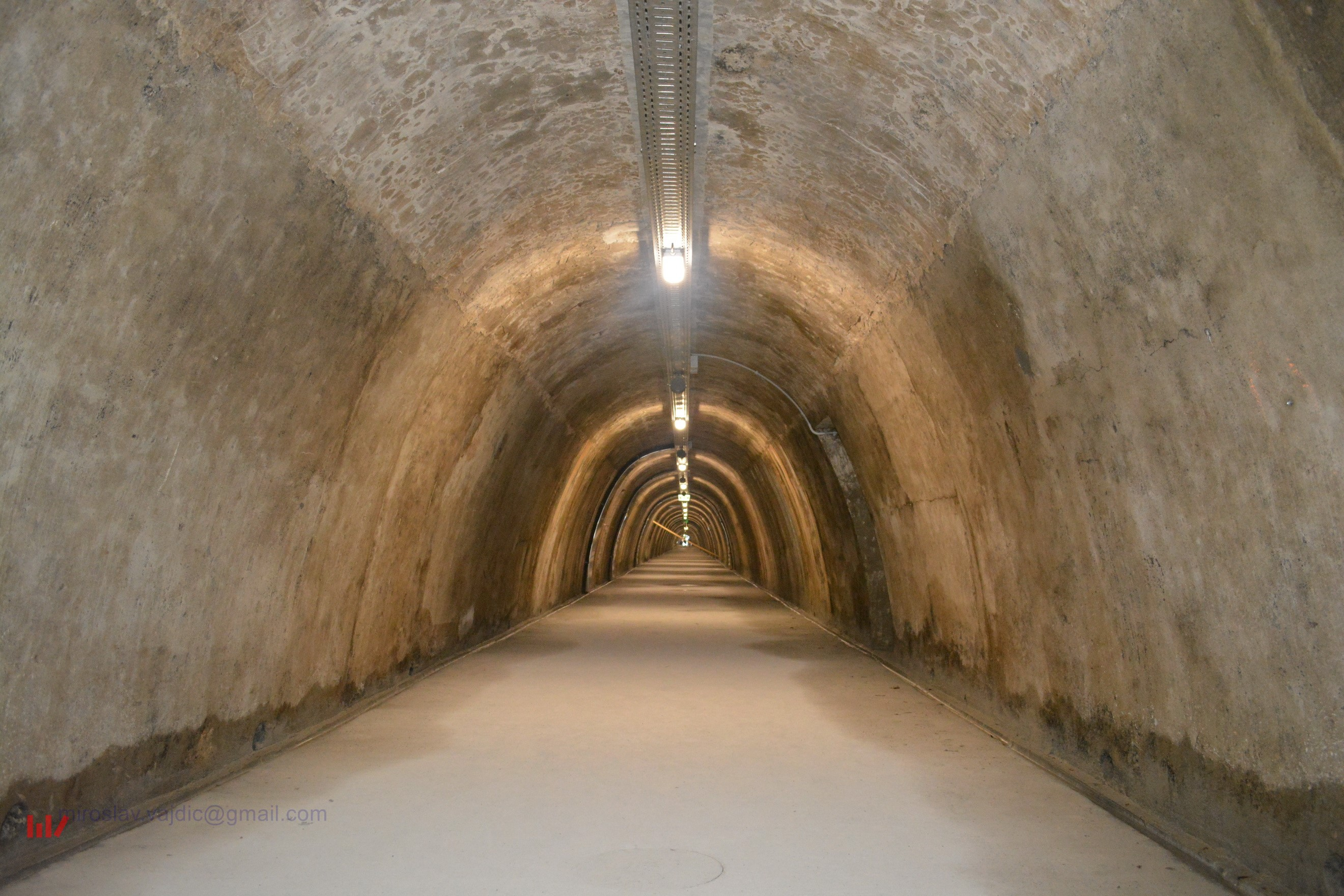
- Inside the Grič Tunnel

- Location within Croatia
- Interactive map of Grič Tunnel

Overview
- Coordinates: 45°48′53″N 15°58′23″E

Grič Tunnel (Croatian: Tunel Grič) is a pedestrian tunnel located in the city centre of Zagreb, Croatia, under the historic neighbourhood of Grič (also called Gradec or Gornji Grad), which gave the tunnel its name. The tunnel consists of a central hall, which is connected by two passageways to Mesnička Street in the west and Stjepan Radić Street in the east, and four passageways extending to the south. It was built during World War II by the Ustaše government to serve both as a bomb shelter and a promenade, but following the war it quickly fell into disrepair and disuse. The tunnel saw renewed use only in the 1990s, hosting one of the first raves in Croatia, and functioning as a shelter during the Croatian War of Independence. In 2016, the tunnel was remodeled and opened to the public, serving as a tourist attraction and hosting cultural events. Planned expansions include a museum and a lift.

== Description ==
The tunnel spans 350 metres (1,150 ft) from Mesnička Street to Stjepan Radić Street, and measures 3.2 metres (10 ft) in width. The central hall measures around 100 metres (330 ft) in length and 5.5 metres (18 ft) in width. The tunnel has six exits – the western one in Mesnička Street, the eastern in a yard at Radić Street 19, and four branches extending southwards to back yards in Ilica Street and Tomić Street. One of these exits leads to Tomić Street 5a (Art Park), one to Ilica 8, and the two between them are unfinished as of December 2016, leading to Ilica 28 and 30. The tunnel's floor surface encompasses around 2,200 square metres (24,000 sq ft).

The tunnel is open for public access every day from 9 a.m. to 9 p.m. Two sets of public toilets, remodeled in 2016, are placed near two of the tunnel exits. Parts of the original signage remain, but they were not fully restored in the 2016 remodeling.

== History ==
=== Construction ===
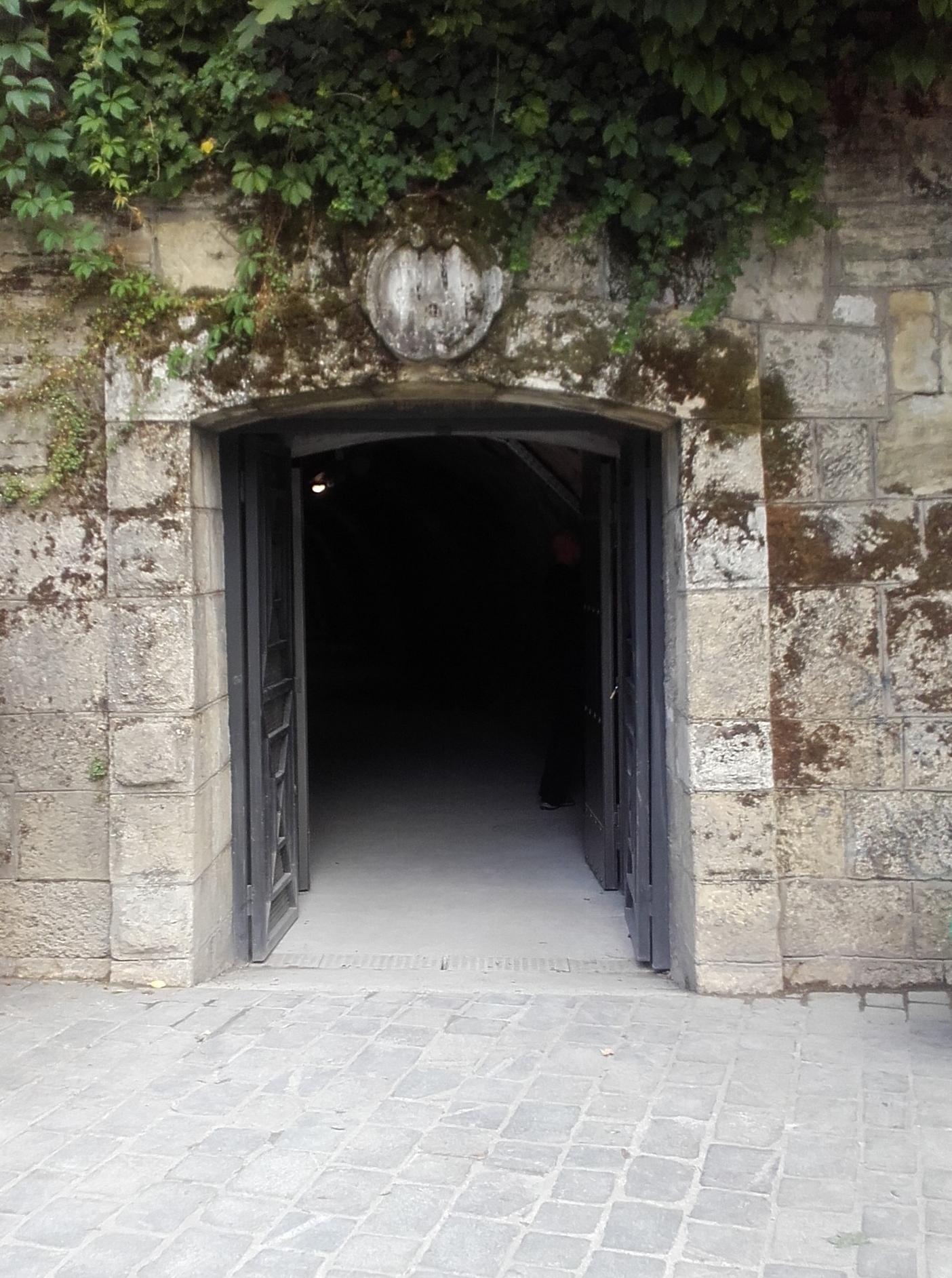
Grič Tunnel, Mesnička Street entrance

During World War II in Zagreb, in 1943, due to a fear of Allied bombing, the prime minister of the Independent State of Croatia (NDH), Nikola Mandić, ordered the creation of a public bomb shelter under the hill of Gornji Grad. The shelter was to be connected to an east-west corridor spanning the entirety of the hill. A sum of 141.2 million NDH kuna was allocated for planning and construction of the tunnel. The project was assigned to engineers Abramović, Senjaković and Vajda. The plan was to construct the tunnel in 90 working days, but the cost rose to 490 million kuna (partly due to high wartime inflation) and the date of opening was delayed into 1944.

The project soon came under criticism. In February 1944, the Construction Committee of Zagreb, which was responsible for urban planning, issued a statement saying that the "creation of a shelter as a transport link is completely inappropriate," and that "too much attention has been devoted to it." Another argument was that in its function as a shelter, the tunnel only had a capacity of 5,000 people. At the time of the statement, the costs amounted to 60,000 kuna per person, which was deemed too expensive by the committee. Nevertheless, the construction continued, albeit parts of the project were scrapped. In May, the mayor of Zagreb, Ivan Werner, rejected the plans for a large central underground hall; instead, only the east-west corridor was built. The tunnel was built mostly using locally sourced materials, including gravel from Zagreb area and wood from Bosnia.

Following the end of World War II, the tunnel was renovated in 1947. Additional work was performed to secure the structure against water damage. In 1949, the tunnel was used as a warehouse by Malina, a food production company. A document dating to 31 October 1949 proposed the construction of another corridor connecting the existing one to the area of Gupčeva Zvijezda, about 2 kilometres (1.2 mi) to the north. There is no evidence that this corridor was ever constructed. However, the NDH plan's central hall, measuring almost 100 metres (330 ft) in length, was built sometime after. Emil Matešić, the director of the Cultural Informative Centre of Zagreb (Croatian: Kulturno informativni centar), believed that its construction was driven by the Cold War tensions and carried out in secret with some documents concerning the tunnel not having been released by the Croatian Ministry of Defence as of July 2016.

=== Fall into obscurity ===
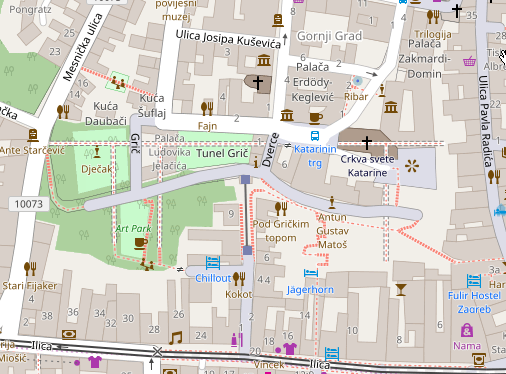
Map of Grič Tunnel and surrounding area

From the mid-20th century, the tunnel fell into disuse. It became popular with homeless people and drug users. A police report from around 1950 stated that squatters used the edifice for warmth and shelter from elements, as well as a hideout and a meeting place. The Yugoslav Government's lack of transparency regarding the tunnel led to the rise of a number of urban legends, including the purported existence of walled-off corridors leading towards the Croatian Parliament palace on St. Mark's Square (in the centre of Gornji Grad), and towards Zagreb Observatory (the northernmost point of the neighbourhood) and on to Gupčeva Zvijezda.

Grič Tunnel was not mentioned again in media until 1993, when it served as the site of the Under City Rave, one of the first raves in Croatia, which was organized by the staff of the TV show Top DJ Mag, and featured DJs from as far as Germany and the UK. At the time, the tunnel was under ownership of the Museum of Contemporary Art. The event was attended by over 3,000 people, far more than the organisers planned for and the tunnel infrastructure allowed for. In 1994, it was part of an exhibition celebrating Earth Day. During the Croatian War of Independence (1991–95), the tunnel saw some use in its intended capacity as an air raid shelter. During this time, temporary toilets were built at the Radić Street exit.

=== Renovation ===
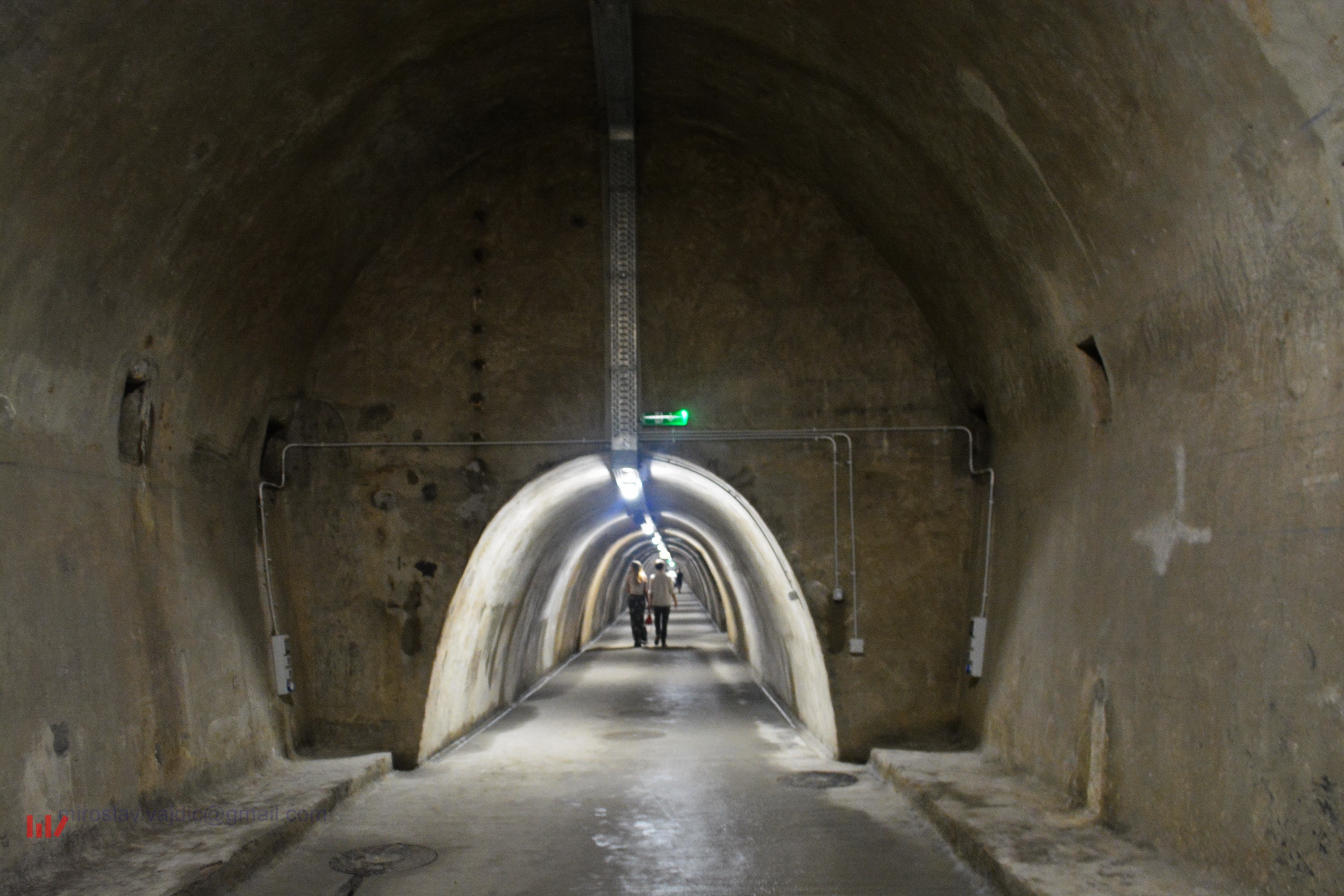
View from the central hall

In the early 21st century, there were several proposals to remodel the tunnel. Proposals included a "museum of senses", and a lift to allow people to reach Gornji Grad from the Tuškanac parking garage without climbing the steep hill on foot. Both proposals were shelved.

A renovation plan was finally announced in April 2015. The work began on 18 April 2016. It was to be done in three phases: the first phase was the renovation of the tunnel, the second phase the addition of a lift to Gornji Grad surface, and the third phase adding cultural facilities to attract tourists. A sum of 1,350,000 kuna (€180,000) was allocated for the first phase. The renovation phase was completed on 6 July and the Grič Tunnel was officially opened to the public. Only the Mesnička Street entrance, Art Park exit and Tomić Street exit were opened at the time; Radić Street and Ilica 28 and 30 entrances remained closed. The execution of the renovation was criticised for not following safety precautions; the tunnel was said to be damp and to lack smoke detectors, fire doors, sprinklers, or a mechanical ventilation system, and the fire escape route was problematic because two exits were narrowed to allow space for toilets.

== Cultural content ==
The Museum of Senses (Croatian: Muzej osjeta) is a planned museum in the Grič Tunnel. The project will use display screens, video projectors and holograms to exhibit the history of Zagreb, while the central hall would be used for temporary exhibitions, concerts and other events. Additionally, two glass lifts are planned to connect the central hall with the Vranyczany Meadow overhead. Both ideas were considered by the city government as of 2005, but were eventually shelved for more than a decade.

The 2016 opening of the tunnel was followed by several performances, including fashion shows and an Advent celebration.

The tunnel complex was also used as a location in the pilot episode of the CBS TV series "FBI: International", broadcast 21 September 2021.
