= March 1920 Zagreb local elections =

Local elections in Croatia

- 21 March 1920

50 seats to the Zagreb City Assembly
- Turnout: 77.08%
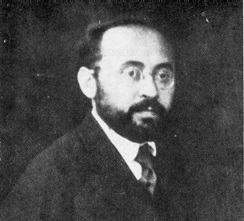

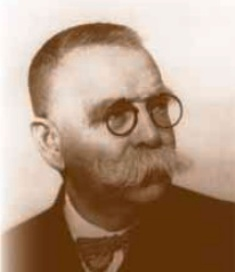
	First party	Second party
Candidate	Svetozar Delić	Stjepan Srkulj
Party	Socialist Workers' Party of Yugoslavia	HZ
Seats won	20 / 50	15 / 50
Seat change	▲20	▼26
Popular vote	7,011	5,491
Percentage	39.27%	30.76%
Mayor before election
Stjepan Srkulj
HZ
Elected mayor
Svetozar Delić
SRPJ(k)

On 21 March 1920 local elections were held in Zagreb, the first ones in the newly formed Kingdom of Serbs, Croats and Slovenes. The incumbent mayor was Stjepan Srkulj from the Croatian Union party, who took office in 1917. Svetozar Delić of the Socialist Workers' Party of Yugoslavia was elected mayor, but his term lasted only six days before being suspended by the government. New elections were called for 18 June 1920.

== Results ==
Political party	Votes	%	Seats	%
Socialist Workers' Party of Yugoslavia; Socijalistička radnička partija Jugoslavije	7,011	39.27%	20	40%
Croatian Union; Hrvatska zajednica	5,491	30.76%	15	30%
Democratic Party; Demokratska stranka	1,882	10.54%	5	10%
Croatian Party of Rights; Hrvatska stranka prava	955	5.35%	3	6%
Croatian Popular Party; Hrvatska pučka stranka	790	4.43%	2	4%
Jew Party; Židovska stranka	496	2.78%	2	4%
Croatian People's Peasant Party; Hrvatska pučka seljačka stranka	449	2.52%	1	2%
People's Socialist Party; Narodna socijalistička stranka	384	2.15%	1	2%
Social Democratic Party; Socijaldemokratska stranka	284	1.59%	1	2%
People's Radical Party; Narodna radikalna stranka	110	0.61%	0	0%
Total	17,950	100%	50	100%
Registered Voters/Turnout	23,290	77.08%		

== Mayoral elections ==
At the meeting of the City Assembly on 16 April 1920 it was to be decided who will be the new mayor in a two-round voting system. In the first round of the vote Svetozar Delić of the Socialist Workers' Party of Yugoslavia (SRPJ(k)) gained 22 votes, incumbent mayor Stjepan Srkulj from the Croatian Union (HZ) received 14 votes, Ivan Ancel from the Democratic Party (DS) 4 votes, Milan Krešić from the DS one vote, and four ballots were not valid (empty). Svetozar Delić and Stjepan Srkulj each failed to get more than 50%, but managed to get into the second round. The second round was won by Delić with 27 votes against Srkulj's 14.

== Aftermath ==
The Croatian-Slavonian Provincial Government led by Croatian Ban Matko Laginja suspended the election of Svetozar Delić, relieving him of his duty, and named Dragutin Tončić as the government commissioner. On 20 April the government suspended the SRPJ(k) delegates and called for a new election for 20 seats in the City Assembly on 18 June 1920. Dragutin Tončić was named the acting mayor on 5 May 1920.

== See also ==
- List of mayors of Zagreb
- 1920 Kingdom of Serbs, Croats and Slovenes Constitutional Assembly election
