= June 1920 Zagreb local elections =

Local elections in Croatia

- 18 June 1920

20 seats to the Zagreb City Assembly
- Turnout: 13.64%
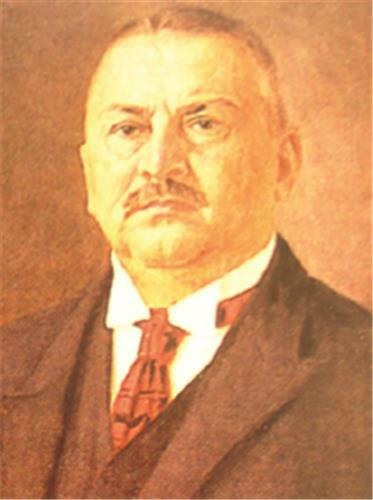

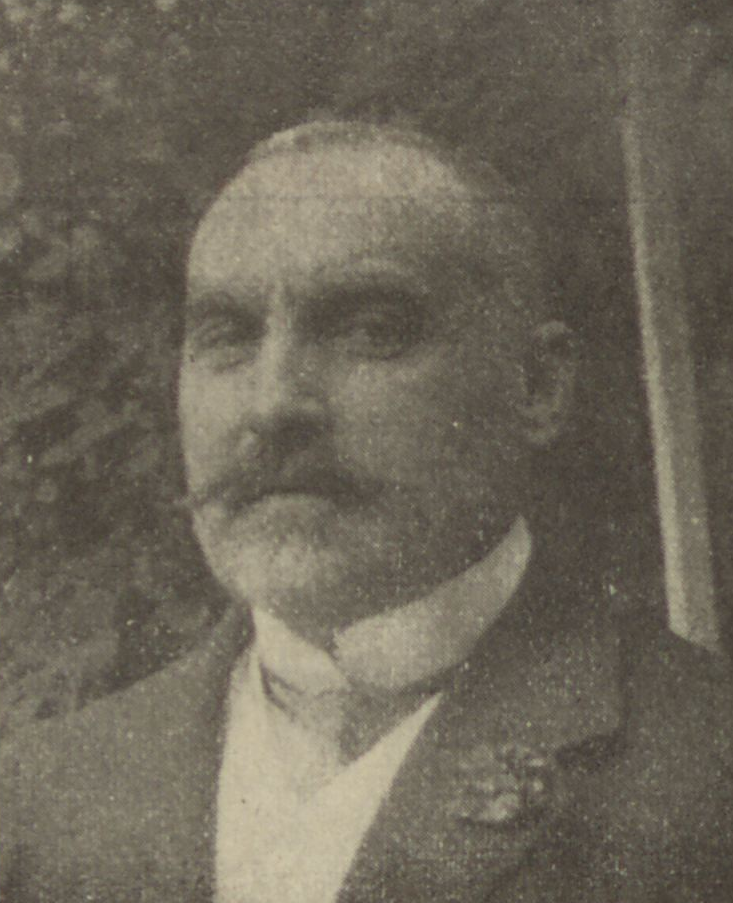
	First party	Second party
Candidate	Vjekoslav Heinzel	Vladimir Prebeg
Party	Croatian Union	Croatian Party of Rights
Seats won	13 / 20	5 / 20
Popular vote	2,070	766
Percentage	65.16%	24.11%
Mayor before election
Dragutin Dončić
Elected mayor
Vjekoslav Heinzel
Croatian Union

On 18 June 1920 local elections were held in Zagreb, in the Kingdom of Serbs, Croats and Slovenes. The elections were held for the revoked mandates from last local elections in March 1920. The Croatian Union won a majority of seats and Vjekoslav Heinzel was named the new mayor of Zagreb.

== Results ==
Political party	Votes	%	Seats	%
Croatian Union; Hrvatska zajednica	2,070	65.16%	13	65%
Croatian Party of Rights; Hrvatska stranka prava	766	24.11%	5	25%
Croatian People's Peasant Party; Hrvatska pučka seljačka stranka	212	6.67%	1	5%
People's Socialist Party; Narodna socijalistička stranka	129	4.06%	1	5%
Total	3,177	100%	20	100%
Registered Voters/Turnout	23,290	13.64%		

== Mayoral elections ==
Democratic Party boycotted the elections and asked to schedule elections for the entire city assembly. The assembly after these elections had 28 members of the Croatian Union, 8 representatives of the Croatian Party of Rights, 5 from the Democratic Party, 5 from the Croatian People's Peasant Party, 1 from the Social Democratic Party, 2 representatives of Jewish parties and 1 socialist. On 17 August 17, 1920 Vjekoslav Heinzel was elected mayor with 27 votes, while Vladimir Prebeg from the Party of Rights received eight votes. Eight votes were invalid (blank ballots).

== See also ==
- List of mayors of Zagreb
- 1920 Kingdom of Serbs, Croats and Slovenes Constitutional Assembly election
