= Ivo Krbek =

Croatian academic and politician (1890–1966)

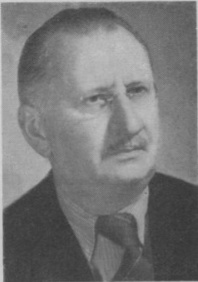

Mayor of Zagreb
- In office 21 April 1932 – 1934
- Preceded by: Stjepan Srkulj
- Succeeded by: Rudolf Erber

Personal details
- Born: 23 August 1890 Zagreb, Croatia-Slavonia, Austria-Hungary
- Died: 17 January 1966 (aged 75) Split, SR Croatia, SFR Yugoslavia
- Party: Independent

Ivo Krbek (23 August 1890 – 17 January 1966) was a Croatian politician, lawyer, lecturer, and academic in the Kingdom of Yugoslavia, the Independent State of Croatia, and the Socialist Federal Republic of Yugoslavia.

== Life ==
Born in Zagreb on 23 August 1890, Krbek graduated from the University of Zagreb in 1912. After receiving a law degree from the university several years later, Krbek began his lengthy tenure as a professor of administrative law at that institution, which lasted for more than fifty years.

His time at the university was interrupted only once, by his two-year term as the 23rd mayor of Zagreb from 1932 to 1934.

On 17 October 1958, Krbek was honored by being inducted into the Slovenian Academy of Sciences and Arts as a full member, a very distinguished position, particularly for an ethnic Croatian.

== Sources ==
- Krbek, Ivo at Proleksis Encyclopedia (in Croatian)

Preceded by Stjepan Srkulj	Mayor of Zagreb; 1932–1934	Succeeded by Rudolf Erber
