= Stjepan Srkulj =

Politician in the kingdoms of Croatia-Slavonia and Yugoslavia

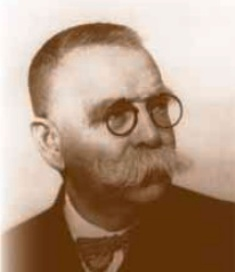

Mayor of Zagreb
- In office 21 September 1917 – 24 November 1919
- Preceded by: Janko Holjac
- Succeeded by: Svetozar Delić
- In office 20 November 1928 – 21 April 1932
- Preceded by: Vjekoslav Heinzel
- Succeeded by: Ivo Krbek

Personal details
- Born: 3 December 1869 Varaždin, Croatia-Slavonia, Austria-Hungary
- Died: 8 September 1951 (aged 81) Zagreb, PR Croatia, FPR Yugoslavia
- Party: Croat-Serb Coalition (until 1918); Croatian Union (from 1919); Croatian Bloc (from 1932)
- Occupation: Historian, politician

Stjepan Srkulj (3 December 1869 – 8 September 1951) was a Croatian historian and politician born in Varaždin. Srkulj studied history and earned his doctoral degree from the University of Vienna before working as a high school teacher between 1895 and 1917. He became politically active as a supporter of the Croat-Serb Coalition, the ruling political group in the Kingdom of Croatia-Slavonia within Austria-Hungary. He participated in the coalition's work until 1918 after collapse of Austria-Hungary in the final days of the First World War and establishment of the Kingdom of Serbs, Croats and Slovenes. Srkulj contributed to work of the National Council of Slovenes, Croats and Serbs, an ad-hoc body working towards dissolution of Austria-Hungary and establishment of a political union of the South Slavs, which materialised as the Kingdom of Serbs, Croats and Slovenes. In that period, from September 1917 until October 1919, Srkulj was the Mayor of Zagreb. Following establishment of the South Slavic state, Srkulj joined the newly formed Croatian Union, joining the party leadership. Srkulj was reelected Mayor of Zagreb in 1928 and remained at the post until 1932, remaining at the post following the introduction of the 6 January Dictatorship in 1929. In 1932, Srkulj became the Minister of construction in the government of Vojislav Marinković, and he kept the post in subsequent governments of prime ministers of Yugoslavia Milan Srškić and Nikola Uzunović until 1934. Srkulj published several papers and books including school history textbooks. In 1937, he published the first comprehensive review of Croatian history in 19 maps.
