= 2009 Zagreb local elections =

Local elections in Croatia

2009 Zagreb mayoral election
- 31 May 2009
- Turnout: 33.62%
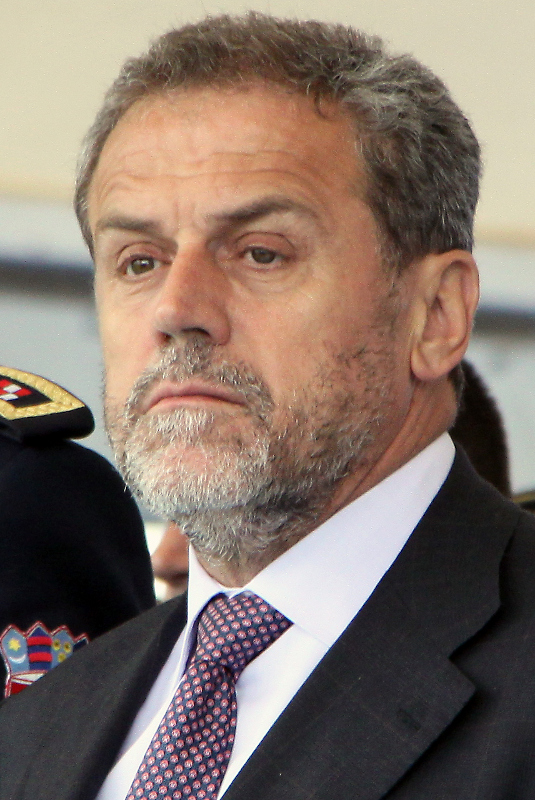

| Candidate | Milan Bandić | Josip Kregar |
| Party | SDP | Independent |
| Popular vote | 149,991 | 88,832 |
| Percentage | 61.84% | 36.62% |
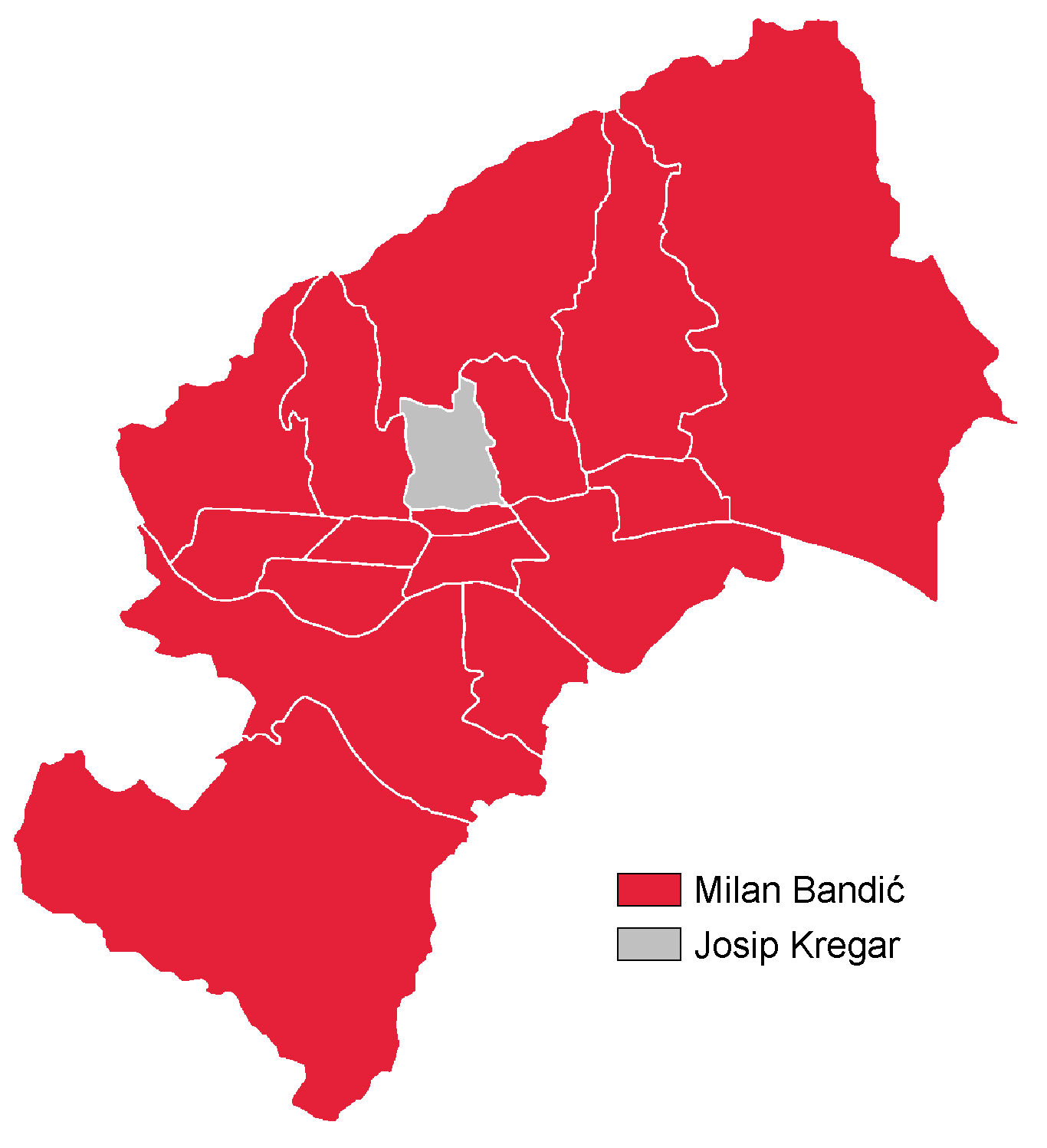
- Results of the second round in all districts of Zagreb: the candidate with the majority of votes in each administrative division: Milan Bandić Josip Kregar
Mayor before election
Milan Bandić
Social Democratic Party (Croatia)
Elected mayor
Milan Bandić
Social Democratic Party (Croatia)

On 17 May 2009, local elections were held in Zagreb, the capital of Croatia. The incumbent mayor was Milan Bandić (elected in 2005), a representative of the Social Democratic Party of Croatia (SDP), also the leading party in the previous city council. Bandić was reelected mayor in the second round of the elections with 61.84% of the votes.

== Mayor election ==
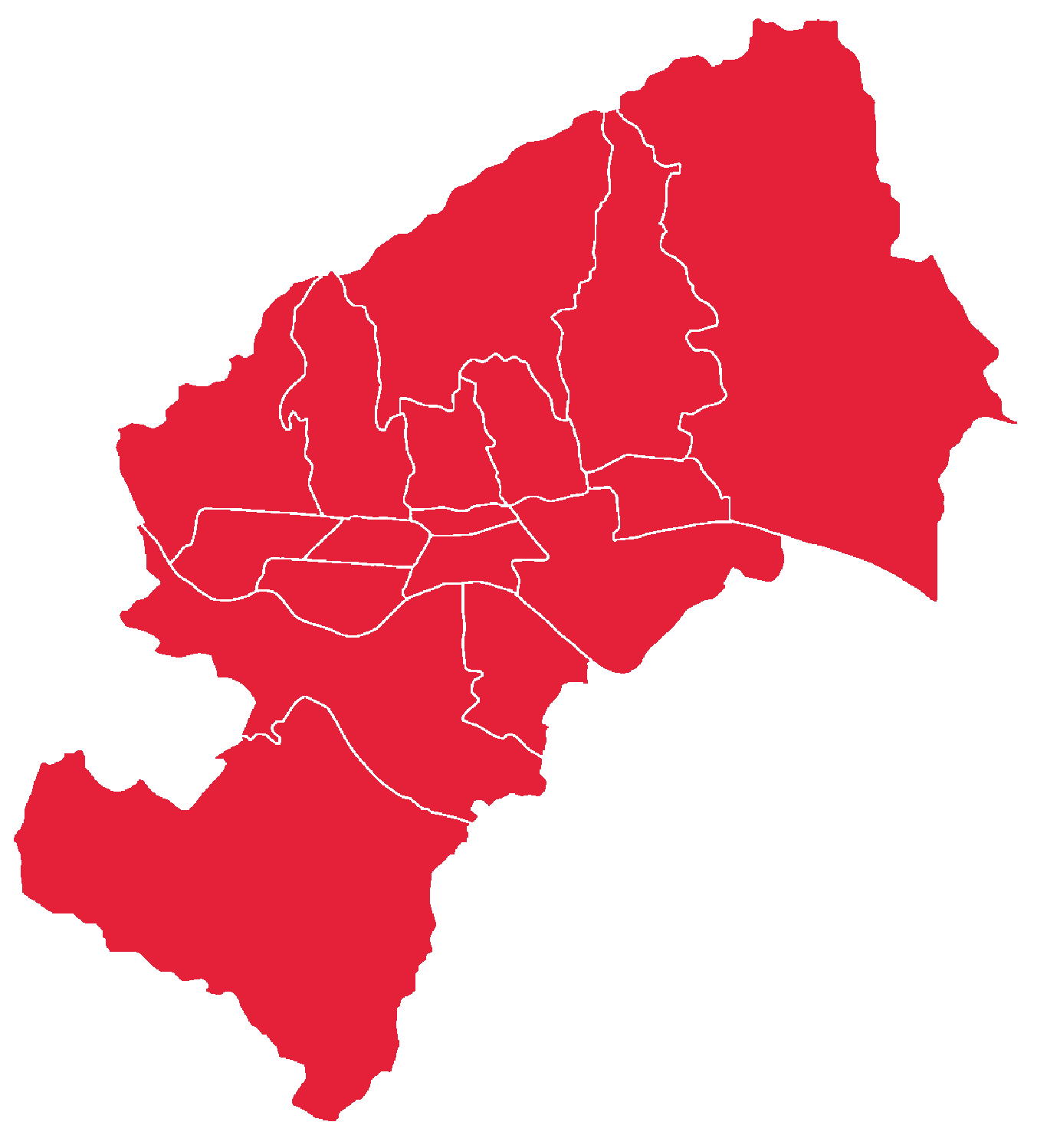
Results of the election for districts of Zagreb: the party with the majority of votes in each district: Social Democratic Party of Croatia

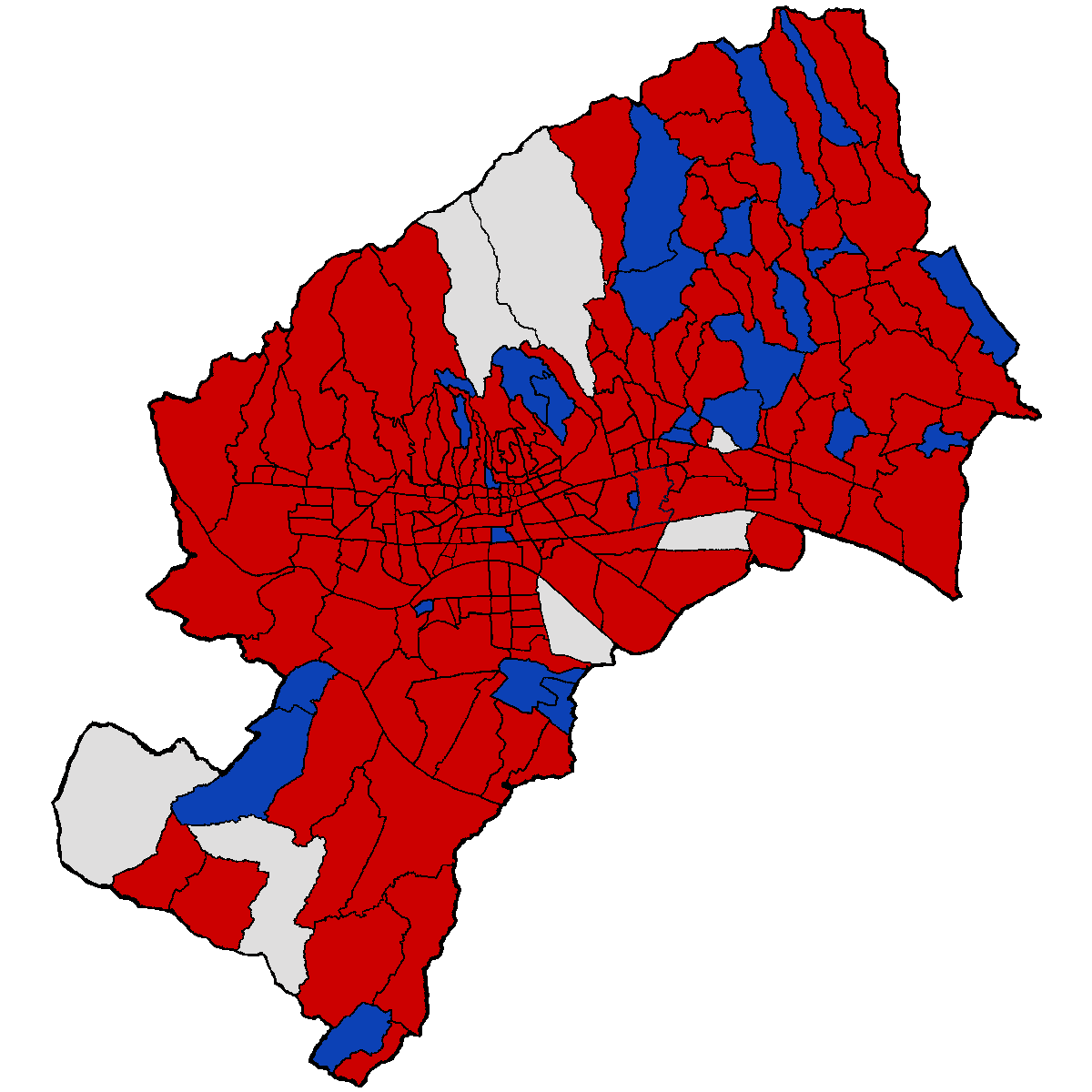
Results of the election for councils of local committees: the party with the majority of votes in each committee: Social Democratic Party of Croatia Croatian Democratic Union Independent

=== First round ===
| Candidate | Party | Votes | % |
|---|---|---|---|
| Milan Bandić | Social Democratic Party of Croatia (SDP); Croatian Party of Pensioners (HSU) | 146,021 | 48.54% |
| Josip Kregar | independent candidate | 69,744 | 23.18% |
| Jasen Mesić | Croatian Democratic Union (HDZ); Croatian Peasant Party (HSS); Croatian Social Liberal Party (HSLS) | 39,623 | 13.17% |
| Tatjana Holjevac | independent candidate | 17,616 | 5.86% |
| Miroslav Rožić | independent candidate | 11,693 | 3.89% |
| Zlatko Klarić | Action of Social Democrats of Croatia (ASH); Democratic Party of Pensioners (DSU) | 4,869 | 1.62% |
| Antun Kljenak | Croatian Party of Rights (HSP) | 4,377 | 1.45% |
| Stipe Tojčić | independent candidate | 1,164 | 0.39% |

=== Second round ===
| Candidate | Party | Votes | % |
|---|---|---|---|
| Milan Bandić | Social Democratic Party of Croatia (SDP); Croatian Party of Pensioners (HSU) | 149,991 | 61.84% |
| Josip Kregar | independent candidate | 88,832 | 36.62% |

== Assembly election ==
| Parties and coalitions | List holder | Popular vote | | | Seats | |
| Parties and coalitions | List holder | Votes | % | ±pp | Total | +/− |
|---|---|---|---|---|---|---|
| Social Democratic Party of Croatia (SDP); Croatian Party of Pensioners (HSU) | Zoran Milanović | 97,678 | 33.34% | –7.61 | 24 | –1 |
| Croatian Democratic Union (HDZ); Croatian Peasant Party (HSS); Croatian Social Liberal Party (HSLS) | Jasen Mesić | 54,006 | 18.43% | +3.03 | 13 | +4 |
| Croatian People's Party – Liberal Democrats (HNS–LD); Alliance of Croatian Pensioners and Seniors (SHUS) | Radimir Čačić | 23,981 | 8.18% | +0.07 | 5 | +1 |
| Independent list of Velimir Srića | Velimir Srića | 23,384 | 7.98% | New | 5 | New |
| Independent list of Tatjana Holjevac | Tatjana Holjevac | 18,712 | 6.39% | –0.58 | 4 | ±0 |
| Independent list of Miroslav Rožić | Miroslav Rožić | 11,166 | 3.81% | New | 0 | New |
| Only Croatia – Movement for Croatia | Ljubo Ćesić Rojs | 10,011 | 3.42% | New | 0 | New |
| Green List | Vlasta Toth | 8,156 | 2.78% | New | 0 | New |
| Croatian Party of Rights (HSP) | Goran Bradić | 6,521 | 2.23% | –9,13 | 0 | –6 |
| Social Democratic Action of Croatia (ASH); Democratic Party of Pensioners (DSU) | Zlatko Klarić | 6,351 | 2.17% | +0,62 | 0 | ±0 |
| Other lists | | 33,043 | 11.28% | | 0 | |
| Total: | | 293,009 | | | 51 | |
| Invalid votes: | | 7,468 | 2.49% | | | |
| Turnout: | | 300,828 | 41.69% | +5.75 | | |
| Registered voters: | | 721,522 | | | | |
Source: City Election Committee

== See also ==
- 2009 Croatian local elections
- List of mayors in Croatia
- List of mayors of Zagreb
