= Ivan Werner =

Croatian politician (1887–1944)

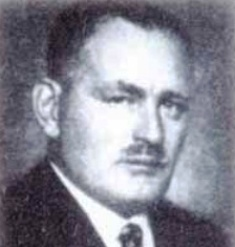

Mayor of Zagreb
- In office 1941 – 26 June 1944
- Preceded by: Jozo Dumančić
- Succeeded by: Eugen Starešinić

Personal details
- Born: 18 June 1887 Zagreb, Croatia-Slavonia, Austria-Hungary
- Died: 26 June 1944 (aged 57) Zagreb, Independent State of Croatia
- Party: Ustaše (UHRO)

Ivan Werner (18 June 1887 – 26 June 1944) was a Croatian politician in the Kingdom of Yugoslavia and the Independent State of Croatia who served as the mayor (gradonačelnik) of Zagreb from 1941 to 1944. A member of the fascist Ustaše party, Werner is best known for ordering the demolition of the Zagreb Synagogue in 1941 and for collaborating and cooperating with the Nazis during the Holocaust.

A butcher by trade, Werner was an expert on food processing and logistics. Werner died on 26 June 1944, and was buried in Mirogoj Cemetery.

Preceded by Jozo Dumančić	Mayor of Zagreb; 1941–1944	Succeeded by Eugen Starešinić
