= Josip Kregar =

Croatian politician

Mayor of Zagreb Government Commissioner
- In office 14 March 2000 – 31 May 2000
- Preceded by: Marina Matulović-Dropulić
- Succeeded by: Milan Bandić

Member of the Croatian Parliament
- In office 22 December 2011 – 28 December 2015
- Constituency: I electoral district

Personal details
- Born: 1 January 1953 Ogulin, PR Croatia, FPR Yugoslavia
- Died: 15 August 2020 (aged 67) Zagreb, Croatia
- Party: Independent (before 2015); Forward Croatia! - Progressive Alliance (2015–2019)
- Education: University of Zagreb
- Occupation: Jurist; politician; sociologist

Josip Kregar (1 January 1953 – 15 August 2020) was a Croatian sociologist, jurist and politician. Kregar was a tenured professor at the Faculty of Law of the University of Zagreb and an independent member of the Zagreb Assembly from 2009. Between 2005 and 2009 he was the dean of the Faculty of Law at the University of Zagreb.

Kregar was born in Ogulin and went to grade school in Novi Vinodolski. He finished gymnasium in Šibenik and graduated from the Faculty of Law in Zagreb in 1976. He obtained a master's degree in public administration and political science in 1982. From 1986 he worked as a lecturer at the law faculty, teaching sociology of law. In 1991 he obtained a doctorate in law. He had authored and co-authored six books on the subject of law sociology, had participated in several research projects on the topic of public administration and has been a consultant for both the Zagreb city government and the Croatian Government on these and similar issues. Kregar authored the Croatian translation of the European Convention on Human Rights.

In 2000 Kregar was appointed interim mayor of Zagreb for two months. In the 2009 local elections, Kregar organized an independent (non-party) list and achieved substantial success, joining forces with Velimir Srića (another University of Zagreb professor, from the Faculty of Economics) to win five seats in the city council, as well as having entered the second round of mayoral elections, despite majority support for Milan Bandić. Kregar received 69,744 votes or 23.18% in the first round, and 88,832 votes or 36.62% in the second round.

On 15 August 2020, Kregar died at his home in Zagreb at age 67.

Political offices
Preceded by Marina Matulović-Dropulić	Mayor (Government Commissioner) of Zagreb; 2000	Succeeded by Milan Bandić
