= 1997 Zagreb local elections =

1997 Croatian elections

- 13 April 1997

All 50 seats to the Zagreb Assembly 26 seats needed for a majority
- Turnout: 67.61% ▲0.9 pp
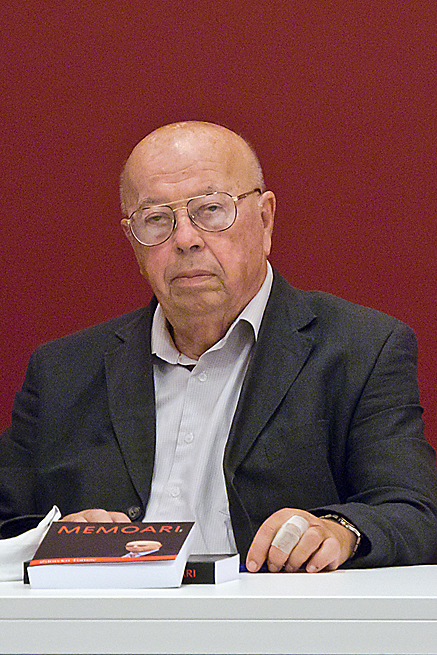
	First party	Second party	Third party
Candidate	Zlatko Canjuga	Zdravko Tomac	Dorica Nikolić
Party	HDZ	SDP	HSLS
Seats won	24 / 50	14 / 50	9 / 50
Seat change	▲8	▲5	▼1
Popular vote	154,960	106,072	46,920
Percentage	34.92%	23.91%	10.57%
Swing	▼1.63 pp	▲5.28 pp	▼2.3 pp
Mayor before election
Stjepan Brolich (acting)
HDZ
Elected mayor
Marina Matulović-Dropulić
HDZ

Elections were held in Zagreb on 13 April 1997 for members of the Zagreb Assembly. The Croatian Democratic Union (HDZ) won a majority in the City Assembly with 24 seats out of 50. Marina Matulović-Dropulić was named the new Mayor of Zagreb.

== Results ==
=== Assembly election ===
Parties and coalitions	Popular vote			Seats			
Parties and coalitions	Votes	%	±pp	D'Hondt	Majority	Total	+/−
Croatian Democratic Union (HDZ)	154,960	34.92%	–1.63	18	6	24	+8
Social Democratic Party of Croatia (SDP)	106,072	23.91%	+5.28	12	2	14	+5
Croatian Social Liberal Party (HSLS)	46,920	10.57%	–2.3	5	4	9	–1
Croatian Peasant Party (HSS)	33,952	7.65%	–0.36	3	0	3	–1
Social Democratic Action of Croatia (ASH)	21,135	4.76%	–1.77	0	0	0	–2
Croatian People's Party (HNS)	16,558	3.73%	+2.42	0	0	0	±0
Croatian Party of Rights (HSP)	10,151	2.29%	–4.23	0	0	0	–2
Other lists	53,961	12.16%		0	0	0	–5
Total:	443,709			38	12	50	
Invalid votes:	10,156	2.24%					
Turnout:	453,865	67.61%	+0.9				
Registered voters:	671,255						
Source: City Election Committee

Popular vote
HDZ	34.92%
SDP	23.91%
HSLS	10.57%
HSS	7.65%
ASH	4.76%
HNS	3.73%
HSP	2.29%
Other	12.16%

Seat totals
HDZ	48%
SDP	28%
HSLS	18%
HSS	6%

The Croatian Democratic Union (HDZ) won 34.92% of the votes or 154,960 and gained 24 out of 50 seats in the Zagreb City Assembly. The Social Democratic Party of Croatia (SDP) came second with 106,072 or 23.91% of the votes and 14 seats, while the Croatian Social Liberal Party (HSLS) came third with 46,920 votes or 10.57% and gained 9 seats. After Croatian Peasant Party (HSS) members of the Assembly joined HDZ, Marina Matulović Dropulić was named the new Mayor of Zagreb.

== See also ==
- List of mayors of Zagreb
