= Hrvoje Matković =

Croatian historian

- Born: October 14, 1923
- Died: August 26, 2010 (aged 86)
- Occupation: Historian

Hrvoje Matković (October 14, 1923 – August 26, 2010) was a Croatian historian.

Matković was born in Šibenik. He finished gymnasium in Šibenik, and graduated history in 1947. He obtained his Ph.D. in 1971 at the University of Zagreb.

He worked in gymnasium in Ogulin (1948), then in school in Petrinja until 1954, and finally in the Croatian History Museum and Faculty of Political Science, University of Zagreb until his retirement in 1990.

The focus of Matković's research was the 20th-century history of Croatia.

== Main works ==
- Svetozar Pribičević i Samostalna demokratska stranka do šestojanuarske diktature (1972)
- Suvremena politička povijest Hrvatske (1993, 1995, 1999)
- Povijest Nezavisne Države Hrvatske, Zagreb: Naklada P.I.P. Pavičić (1994, 2002)
- Svetozar Pribičević, ideolog-stranački vođa-emigrant (1995)
- Šibenska županija, priručnik za zavičajnu nastavu (1995)
- Povijest Jugoslavije: hrvatski pogled (1998)
- Povijest Hrvatske seljačke stranke (1999)
