= Goran Granić =

Croatian politician

Goran Granić (born 18 April 1950) is a former Croatian centre-left politician who was the deputy prime minister from 2000 to 2002.

Granić was born in Baška Voda. He graduated from the Faculty of Electrical Engineering in Zagreb in 1972, obtaining a PhD from the same faculty in 1979. From 1973 to 1978 he worked as a researcher at the Energy Institute in Zagreb. After the first democratic elections in 1990, Granić became the first director of Hrvatska elektroprivreda, the national power company of Croatia.

From 1992 to 1995, Granić served as a member of the Croatian Parliament. From 1995 to 1996, Granić was selected as mayor of Zagreb by his party that won the local elections. However, the president, Franjo Tuđman did not allow him to proceed with his duties as mayor, leading to the Zagreb Crisis: Zagreb's local government would go on to place four other mayors from the party, each of which was blocked by Tuđman.

As a member of the HSLS party, which was allied with SDP during the 2000 parliament elections, Granić entered the newly formed government as Ivica Račan's deputy prime minister.

He was much praised by his superior, Račan, during his term in office. However, HSLS's leader, Dražen Budiša (having failed in the presidential elections) suddenly wanted the position of prime minister and forced Račan – since his party's parliament votes were vital to the government – to dismiss Granić and place him instead. Despite his new position, Budiša wasn't satisfied and suddenly led his party out of the government. As a result, HSLS split into two factions.

The dissident pro-government faction – including Granić and Jozo Radoš as more prominent members – created a new party – Liberals of Croatia – Libra.

Libra merged with the Croatian People's Party in 2005, since known as the Croatian People's Party – Liberal Democrats, but Granić himself has mostly shunned politics after his government position, having returned to the Energy Institute Hrvoje Požar in 2003.

He is a brother of Mate Granić, once a prominent member of the rival Croatian Democratic Union (HDZ).
