= Marina Matulović-Dropulić =

Croatian politician

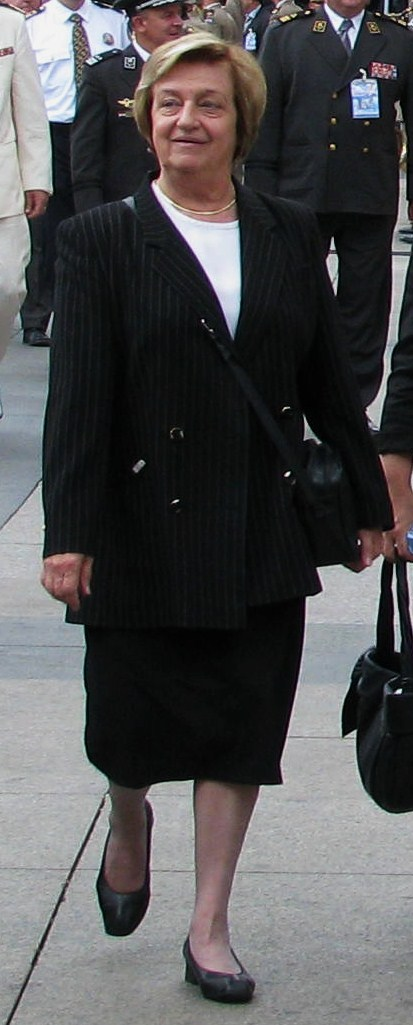

Minister of Construction and Spatial Planning
- In office 23 December 2003 – 29 December 2010
- Preceded by: Radimir Čačić
- Succeeded by: Branko Bačić
- In office 27 January 1995 – 16 December 1996
- Preceded by: Zlatko Tomčić
- Succeeded by: Marko Širac

Mayor of Zagreb Prefect of the Zagreb County (1996)
- In office 5 June 1997 – 14 March 2000
- Preceded by: Stjepan Brolich (Government Commissioner); Herself (Mayor)
- Succeeded by: Josip Kregar (Government Commissioner); Milan Bandić
- In office 2 March 1996 – 30 April 1996
- Preceded by: Branko Mikša
- Succeeded by: Stjepan Brolich (Government Commissioner); Herself (as Mayor)

Personal details
- Born: 21 June 1942 (age 84) Zagreb, Independent State of Croatia (modern Croatia)
- Party: Croatian Democratic Union
- Occupation: Politician

Marina Matulović-Dropulić (born 21 June 1942) is a Croatian politician who served as Minister of Spatial Planning, Construction and Housing in the cabinet of prime Minister Zlatko Mateša from 1995 until 1996, and as Minister of Construction, Spatial Planning and Environment in the two cabinets of Ivo Sanader from 2003 until 2009, as well as the cabinet of Jadranka Kosor until 2010. Furthermore, Matulović-Dropulić served as the 49th Mayor of Zagreb, becoming the first woman in the city's history to hold that post. She was initially appointed to the post in 1996 by President Franjo Tuđman, who had refused to appoint four other candidates elected by the city council to serve as the mayor, an incident known as the Zagreb crisis. She was once more elected mayor in 1997 and served until 2000. She is a member of the Croatian Democratic Union party.

== Biography ==
Marina Matulović was born on 21 June 1942 in Zagreb.

She acquired her degree in architecture from the University of Zagreb in 1967 and worked in a number of positions in the construction business, including being the technical director of Građevni kombinat 'Međimurje' in Čakovec, as well as of the Department of Building Construction of the Institute of Construction in Zagreb.

From 1985 until 1990 she was the chairwoman of the Zagreb's Committee for Construction, Housing and Public utilities. In 1990 she became the deputy chairwoman of Zagreb's Executive Committee under Mladen Vedriš. In 1993 Matulović-Dropulić became the Deputy Mayor of Zagreb, during the term of Mayor Branko Mikša.

In 1995 she became a government minister in the cabinet of Zlatko Mateša, holding the portfolio of Spatial Planning, Construction and Housing. She served in that position until President Franjo Tuđman appointed her as mayor of Zagreb in December 1996. Tuđman, however, had already appointed her as mayor on 2 March 1996, but the city council had refused to endorse such a move. Namely, before the appointment of Matulović-Dropulić herself, Tuđman had already refused to endorse two candidates elected to the mayorship by the city council: Goran Granić and Jozo Radoš and a further two candidates were rejected by him after the council refused to back Matulović-Dropulić: Ivo Škrabalo and Dražen Budiša. She was thus only confirmed as mayor in late 1996 after city council members from the Croatian Peasant Party sided with the Croatian Democratic Union.

In the 2000 election she was elected a member of Croatian Parliament and served until December 2003, when she was once more appointed a government minister, this time in the newly formed cabinet of Ivo Sanader, and again taking up the portfolio of Construction, Spatial Planning and Environment. She remained in her post after Sanader formed second cabinet following the 2007 parliamentary election. When Sanader resigned in July 2009 she remained a minister in the cabinet of his successor as Prime Minister, Jadranka Kosor. Her tenure as minister ended after Kosor conducted a cabinet reshuffle in December 2010. She was succeeded by Branko Bačić.

== Personal life ==
She is married to Duško Dropulić and they have one daughter, Morana.

== Sources ==
- Marina Matulović-Dropulić - Government of Croatia profile
- Marina Matulović-Dropulić - Fourth assembly of the Croatian Parliament

Political offices
Preceded by Zdenko Karakaš	Minister of Physical Planning, Construction and Housing; 1995–1996	Succeeded by Marko Širac
Preceded by Branko Mikša	Mayor of Zagreb; 1996–2000	Succeeded by Milan Bandić
Preceded by Ivo Banac as Minister of Environmental Protection and Physical Planning	Minister of Environmental Protection, Physical Planning and Construction; 2003–2010	Succeeded by Branko Bačić
Preceded by Radimir Čačić as Minister of Public Works, Construction and Reconstruction	Minister of Environmental Protection, Physical Planning and Construction; 2003–2010	Succeeded by Branko Bačić
