= List of mayors of Zagreb =

Mayor of the City of Zagreb
- Gradonačelnik Grada Zagreba
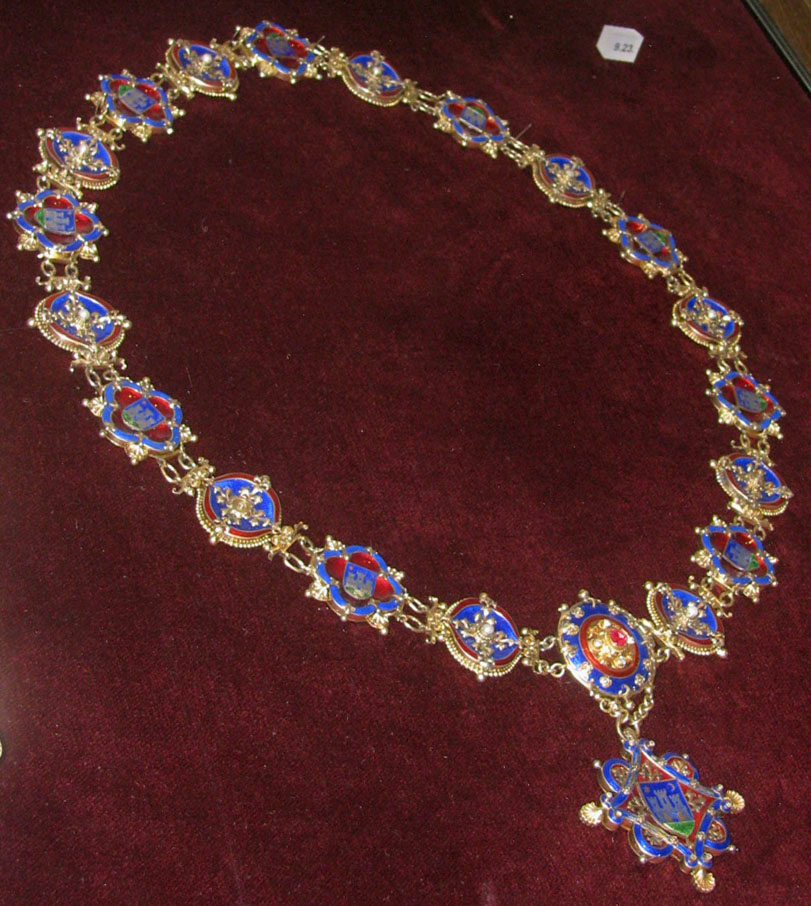
- The Mayor’s chain of honour

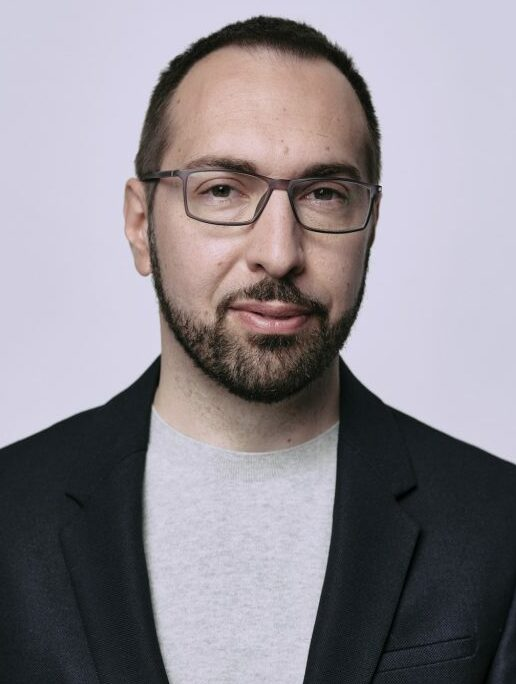
- Incumbent; Tomislav Tomašević since 4 June 2021
- Appointer: Direct elections (before 2009: by Zagreb Assembly)
- Term length: 4 years unlimited number of renewals
- Inaugural holder: Janko Kamauf
- Formation: 1851
- Website: zagreb.hr

This article contains a list of people who have served as mayor of Zagreb, the capital of Croatia, or president of the Zagreb Assembly.

== List ==
No.	Picture	Name	Term of office		Elected	Political party
1		Janko Kamauf	1851	1857		
2		Josip F. Haerdtl	1857	1857		
3		Svetozar Kušević	1858	1858		People's Party
4		Johan Lichtenegger	1858	1 March 1861		
5		Vjekoslav Frigan	1 March 1861	27 February 1868		Unionist Party
6		Makso Mihalić	27 February 1868	17 October 1869		
7		Dragutin Cekuš	17 October 1869	28 February 1872		
8		Pavao Hatz	28 February 1872	28 May 1873		
9		Stjepan Vrabčević	28 May 1873	13 December 1873		
10		Ivan Vončina	13 December 1873	19 September 1876		People's Party
11		Stanko Andrijević	30 November 1876	14 January 1879		People's Party
12		Matija Mrazović	1 February 1879	10 August 1881		Independent People's Party
13		Josip Hoffman	10 August 1881	August 1885		Independent People's Party
14		Nikola Badovinac	5 September 1885	16 June 1887		Independent People's Party
15		Ignjat Sieber	16 June 1887	29 January 1890		
16		Milan Amruš	29 January 1890	20 June 1892		Independent People's Party
17		Adolf Mošinsky	20 June 1892	15 December 1904		
18		Milan Amruš	15 December 1904	5 April 1910		Independent People's Party
19		Janko Holjac	5 April 1910	21 September 1917		Croat-Serb Coalition
20		Stjepan Srkulj	21 September 1917	24 November 1919		Croatian Union
21		Svetozar Delić	16 April 1920	22 April 1920	1920	Socialist Workers' Party of Yugoslavia
22		Dragutin Tončić	22 April 1920	17 August 1920		
23		Vjekoslav Heinzel	17 August 1920	23 October 1928	1920	Croatian Union
23		Vjekoslav Heinzel	17 August 1920	23 October 1928	1921	Croatian Bloc
23		Vjekoslav Heinzel	17 August 1920	23 October 1928	1927	Croatian Bloc
24		Stjepan Srkulj	20 November 1928	21 April 1932		Croatian Bloc
25		Ivo Krbek	21 April 1932	1934		Independent
26		Rudolf Erber	1934	21 October 1936		Independent
—		Teodor Kaufmann (acting)	21 October 1936	31 March 1937		Independent
27		Teodor Peičić	31 March 1937	1939		Independent
28		Mate Starčević	1939	10 April 1941		Croatian Peasant Party
29		Jozo Dumandžić	10 April 1941	1941		Ustaša – Croatian Revolutionary Organization
30		Ivan Werner	1941	26 June 1944(Died in office)		Ustaša – Croatian Revolutionary Organization
31		Eugen Starešinić	August 1944	6 May 1945		Ustaša – Croatian Revolutionary Organization
32		Dragutin Saili	6 May 1945	1949		Communist Party of Croatia
33		Mika Špiljak	1949	1950		Communist Party of Croatia
34		Milivoj Rukavina	1950	1951		Communist Party of Croatia
35		Mirko Pavleković	1951	1952		Communist Party of Croatia
36		Većeslav Holjevac	1952	1963		League of Communists of Croatia
37		Pero Pirker	1963	1967		League of Communists of Croatia
38		Ratko Karlović	1967	1967		League of Communists of Croatia
39		Josip Kolar	1967	1972		League of Communists of Croatia
40		Ivo Vrhovec	1972	1978		League of Communists of Croatia
41		Ivo Latin	1978	1982		League of Communists of Croatia
42		Mato Mikić	1982	1983		League of Communists of Croatia
43		Aleksandar Varga	1983	1984		League of Communists of Croatia
44		Zorislav Šonje	1984	1985		League of Communists of Croatia
45		Tito Kosty	1985	1986		League of Communists of Croatia
46		Mato Mikić	1986	1990		League of Communists of Croatia
47		Boris Buzančić	1990	1993	1990	Croatian Democratic Union
48		Branko Mikša	1993	2 March 1996	1993	Croatian Democratic Union
49		Marina Matulović-Dropulić	2 March 1996	30 April 1996		Croatian Democratic Union
—		Stjepan Brolich (Government Commissioner)	30 April 1996	5 June 1997		Croatian Democratic Union
49		Marina Matulović-Dropulić	5 June 1997	14 March 2000	1997	Croatian Democratic Union
—		Josip Kregar (Government Commissioner)	14 March 2000	2 June 2000		Independent
50		Milan Bandić	2 June 2000	1 March 2002	2000	Social Democratic Party of Croatia
50		Milan Bandić	2 June 2000	1 March 2002	2001	Social Democratic Party of Croatia
51		Vlasta Pavić	1 March 2002	14 June 2005	—	Social Democratic Party of Croatia
52		Milan Bandić	14 June 2005	28 February 2021 (Died in office)	2005	Social Democratic Party of Croatia
52		Milan Bandić	14 June 2005	28 February 2021 (Died in office)	2009	Social Democratic Party of Croatia
52		Milan Bandić	14 June 2005	28 February 2021 (Died in office)	2013	Independent
52		Milan Bandić	14 June 2005	28 February 2021 (Died in office)	2017	BM 365 – Labour and Solidarity Party
—		Jelena Pavičić Vukičević (Deputy Mayor acting as Mayor)	28 February 2021	4 June 2021	—	BM 365 – Labour and Solidarity Party
53		Tomislav Tomašević	4 June 2021	Incumbent	2021	We Can!

== See also ==
- List of mayors in Croatia
