= Vjekoslav Heinzel =

Architect

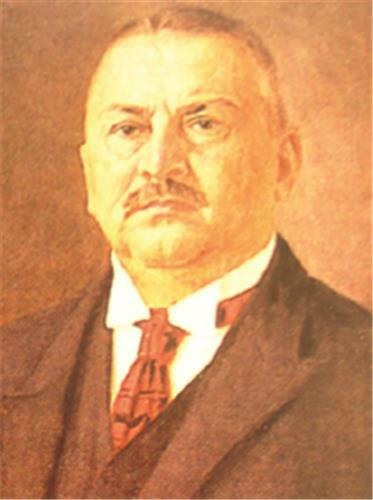

Mayor of Zagreb
- In office 17 August 1920 – 23 October 1928
- Preceded by: Dragutin Tončić
- Succeeded by: Stjepan Srkulj

Personal details
- Born: Alois Heinzel; 21 August 1871 Zagreb, Croatia-Slavonia, Austria-Hungary
- Died: 1 March 1934 (aged 62) Zagreb, Kingdom of Yugoslavia
- Spouse: Berta Pick
- Education: Technische Hochschule Graz; University of Stuttgart
- Profession: Architect

Vjekoslav Heinzel (Croatian pronunciation: [ʋjêkoslaʋ xǎjnt͡sl̩]; 21 August 1871 – 1 March 1934) was the Mayor of Zagreb from 1920 to 1928. He is best remembered for great development projects of the 1920s that significantly expanded the city.

Heinzel was born as Alois Heinzel into an entrepreneurial family in Zagreb and was sent to Graz and Stuttgart to become an architect, graduating in 1893. Licensed for standalone work as an architect in 1896, he designed numerous buildings in Zagreb. In 1906, Alois changed his name to Vjekoslav. In 1910, he became a city councillor and in 1912, he became the head of the local Chamber of Trade and Crafts. The same year he ceased his professional activities and traveled across Europe before he returned and organized the food supply of Zagreb during World War I.

Heinzel was also an early automobilist, who along with Ferdinand Budicki drove the first car in Zagreb, and was one of the founders of the Croatian automobile club in 1906. He participated in many early car races, including winning the first race for the championship of the Kingdom of Croatia-Slavonia in 1912.

During the Kingdom of Serbs, Croats and Slovenes, Heinzel was first elected mayor in 1920 and served until the August 1921, when the city administration was temporarily disbanded. In 1922, he was elected as a member of the Croatian Bloc. In 1926 and 1927 he had a falling out with the Party of Rights and the Croatian Peasant Party, but was re-elected in the subsequent election. His administration organized the construction of large sections of today's Peščenica, Trnje, Trešnjevka, Maksimir and other city neighborhoods. His contributions included the construction and expansion of numerous hospitals, the beginning of the Dolac Market, and the reconstruction of the Laščinska road, later Sajmišna, and today the Vjekoslav Heinzel Avenue, a prominent north–south avenue in the eastern part of the city that starts at the Eugen Kvaternik Square and divides Trnje and Peščenica.

During Heinzel's term as mayor, Zagreb got its first 0.35 kW radio transmitter on 15 June 1926. On 1 April of the same year, the city installed its first automatic switchboard, with the capacity of 7,000 telephone subscribers.

Heinzel's efforts came at a considerable cost, however, as the city had to take out a loan of 250 million Yugoslav dinars, a topic of much criticism at the time.

Political offices
Preceded by Stjepan Srkulj	Mayor of Zagreb; 1920–1928	Succeeded by Stjepan Srkulj
