= Croatian Bloc (coalition) =

1921–1923 coalition in the Kingdom of Yugoslavia

Croatian Bloc Hrvatski blok
- Leader: Stjepan Radić
- Founded: 21 May 1921
- Dissolved: 1923
- Headquarters: Zagreb
- Ideology: Federalism

The Croatian Bloc (Croatian: Hrvatski blok) was a coalition of Croatian political parties in the Kingdom of Serbs, Croats, and Slovenes in existence from 1921 to 1923. The principal member of the group was the Croatian Republican Peasant Party (HRSS) (Note: The Croatian Republican Peasant Party (HRSS) was named the Croatian People's Peasant Party (HPSS) until late 1920. The party was renamed the Croatian Peasant Party (HSS) in 1925.) led by Stjepan Radić, mainly supported by the Croatian Union and the Croatian Party of Rights (HSP). (Note: Sources often refer to the Croatian Party of Rights as the Frankists after the group's initial leader Josip Frank. The Party of Rights split in two in 1895 and its Frankist faction formed the Pure Party of Rights.. The splinter party was renamed the Starčević Croatian Party of Rights in 1904, and its name changed again to the Party of Rights in 1910. The party was renamed the Croatian Party of Rights in 1919.)

The coalition formed in protest against the Constitutional Assembly's refusal to use supermajority voting during the drafting of the country's first constitution. The HRSS, as the dominant partner in the coalition, also sought to pressure its partners, especially the Croatian Union and the central government, to introduce republicanism – at least at the sub-national level. The Croatian Bloc issued several public statements primarily intended to foster negotiations with the Serb-dominated Democratic Party on constitutional reform. Radić would eventually expel the HSP from the coalition after they criticised the Croatian Bloc's strategy. The coalition dissolved in the run-up to the 1923 parliamentary elections.

The work of the Croatian Bloc strengthened the HRSS and Radić. At the same time, divisions within the Democratic Party deepened over the readiness of the party's president, Ljubomir Davidović, to discuss and potentially accommodate Radić's demands for a confederation in place of a highly-centralised state. While Radić and Davidović negotiated, the HSP negotiated and eventually aligned with the People's Radical Party, another Serb-dominated political party, to undermine the HRSS's dominant position in Croatian politics.

== Background ==
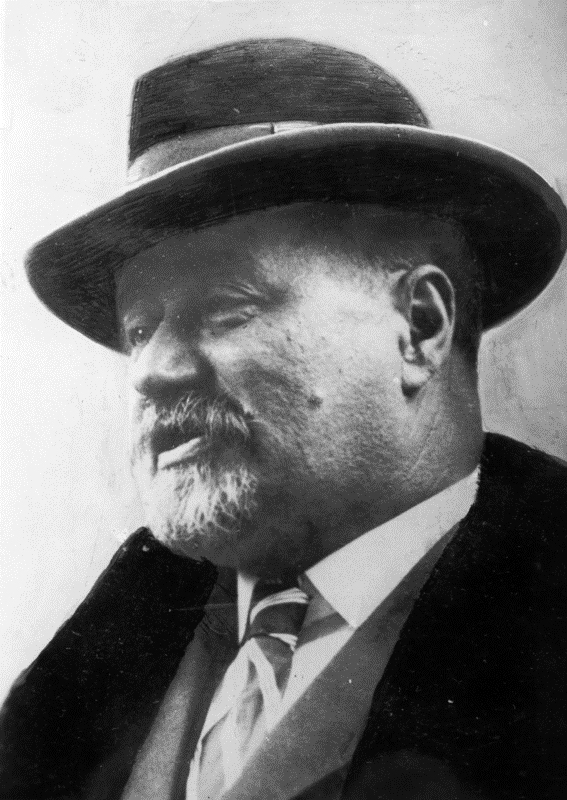
Stjepan Radić led the Croatian Republic Peasant Party.

The 1920 parliamentary elections were called in the Kingdom of Serbs, Croats and Slovenes (later renamed the Kingdom of Yugoslavia) to elect members of the national constituent assembly. At the time, the most significant political division in Yugoslavia appeared around the degree of centralisation in the government, or the issue of how much authority should be exercised by the central government and the provinces respectively. The elections were decisively won by the Croatian Republican Peasant Party (HRSS) in Croatia-Slavonia, taking a lead over the Croatian Union and the Croatian Party of Rights (HSP) by about 45 percentage points combined. The HRSS thus established itself as the main representative of the Croats in Yugoslavia, taking over the role from the Croatian Union.

At a rally held on 8 December 1920, just days after the election, HRSS leader Stjepan Radić announced that the party would refuse to participate in the Constitutional Assembly, since the party members refused to swear an oath of allegiance to the King due to their republican standpoints, as was required to assume their seats in the Assembly. In addition, they hoped to compel the government to renounce its intention of concentrating power in the central government and to initiate genuine negotiations on the system of government. The HSP followed the HRSS and decided not to participate in the parliament, adding their two seats to the list of abstentionists.

At first, the Croatian Union's four elected representatives assumed their seats in the Assembly in opposition to the government's proposed constitution, while trying to entice Radić to follow their example and work from within the parliament. However, in May 1921, the Croatian Union also resigned from the Assembly, protesting that votes only required a simple majority to pass, rather than a supermajority. They claimed that a supermajority was needed for passage of the country's constitution based on the 1917 Corfu Declaration and the Croatian Sabor authorising separation from Austria-Hungary and unification of the South Slavs.

On 12 May, Mate Drinković, an independent member of the Assembly, issued a declaration on behalf of the Croatian Union, accusing the government of trying to impose its will on the Croatian people, denying the assembly's right to adopt any constitution that would be binding for the Croatian region. In October, Radić proposed a merger of the three parties, which was essentially an absorption of the Croatian Union and the HSP by the HRSS, but the offer was declined.

== Establishment ==
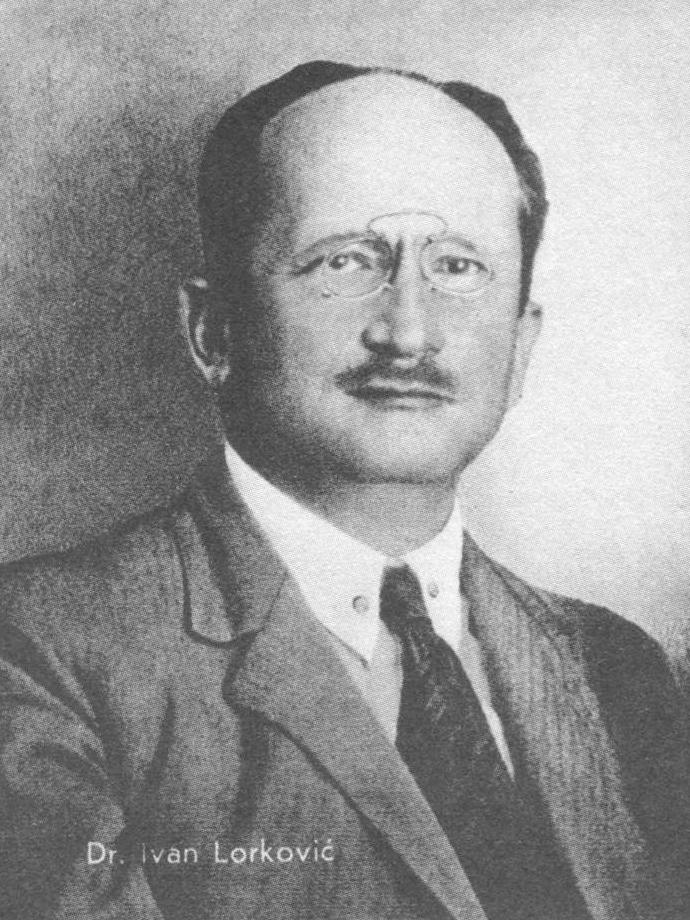
Ivan Lorković led the Croatian Union.

On 21 May 1921, the HRSS, the HSP, and the Croatian Union issued a declaration called A Message to the Croatian People (Poruka hrvatskom narodu). The declaration, largely reflecting Radić's opinions at the time, stated that they had formed the Croatian Bloc coalition for the purpose of safeguarding Croatian national individuality. The coalition parties rejected any claims to the remaining assembly's legitimacy, or that it was entitled to enact a constitution binding for Croats or Croatia.

Following the declaration, the leadership of all three parties spent the entire months of June and July negotiating a joint political programme. In addition to Radić, the HRSS representatives in the negotiations were Ljudevit Kežman and Vladko Maček. Drinković was joined by Ivan Lorković on behalf of the Croatian Union, while Mirko Košutić and Fran Milobar represented the HSP. Additionally, Juraj Šutej, Bariša Smoljan, Ivan Pavičić, and Stjepan Janković were present as representatives of the Croatian Husbandmen's Party – a political party active in Bosnia and Herzegovina, closely tied with the Croatian Union. The HRSS-sponsored Croat Workers' Union supported the coalition.

The parties held different views regarding Croatia's future. The HRSS advocated a Yugoslav confederal republic or, failing that, a Croatian republic within the Kingdom of Yugoslavia. The HSP agreed with the HRSS in advocating for a republic. The HSP was ready to support the HRSS in demanding a decentralised government, viewing it as a necessary step towards an independent Croatia. In contrast, the Croatian Union supported decentralisation of Yugoslavia, but did not support the establishment of a republic. While the coalition talks were in progress, the national assembly adopted the Vidovdan Constitution. The decision was made by a simple majority of parliamentarians, and it established Yugoslavia as a highly centralised monarchy without participation, contrary to the will of the majority of non-Serb parties. This made Yugoslavia subjectively illegitimate in view of most Croats.

In early August, after failing to agree on a common political programme, Radić accepted the Croatian Union's proposal for a common committee to coordinate activities towards the central government in Belgrade. Under that proposal, the individual parties would continue to pursue their own programmes while recognising HRSS as the leading partner in their joint efforts in relation to Belgrade. The HRSS received six out of twelve seats on the board, while the Croatian Union and the HSP received three each. Radić, Drinković and Košutić formed the presidency of the committee. In practice, the committee was dominated by Radić alone, but the coalition was hindered by mutual competition of its members and their ideological divisions.

== Activities ==
=== Memorandum ===
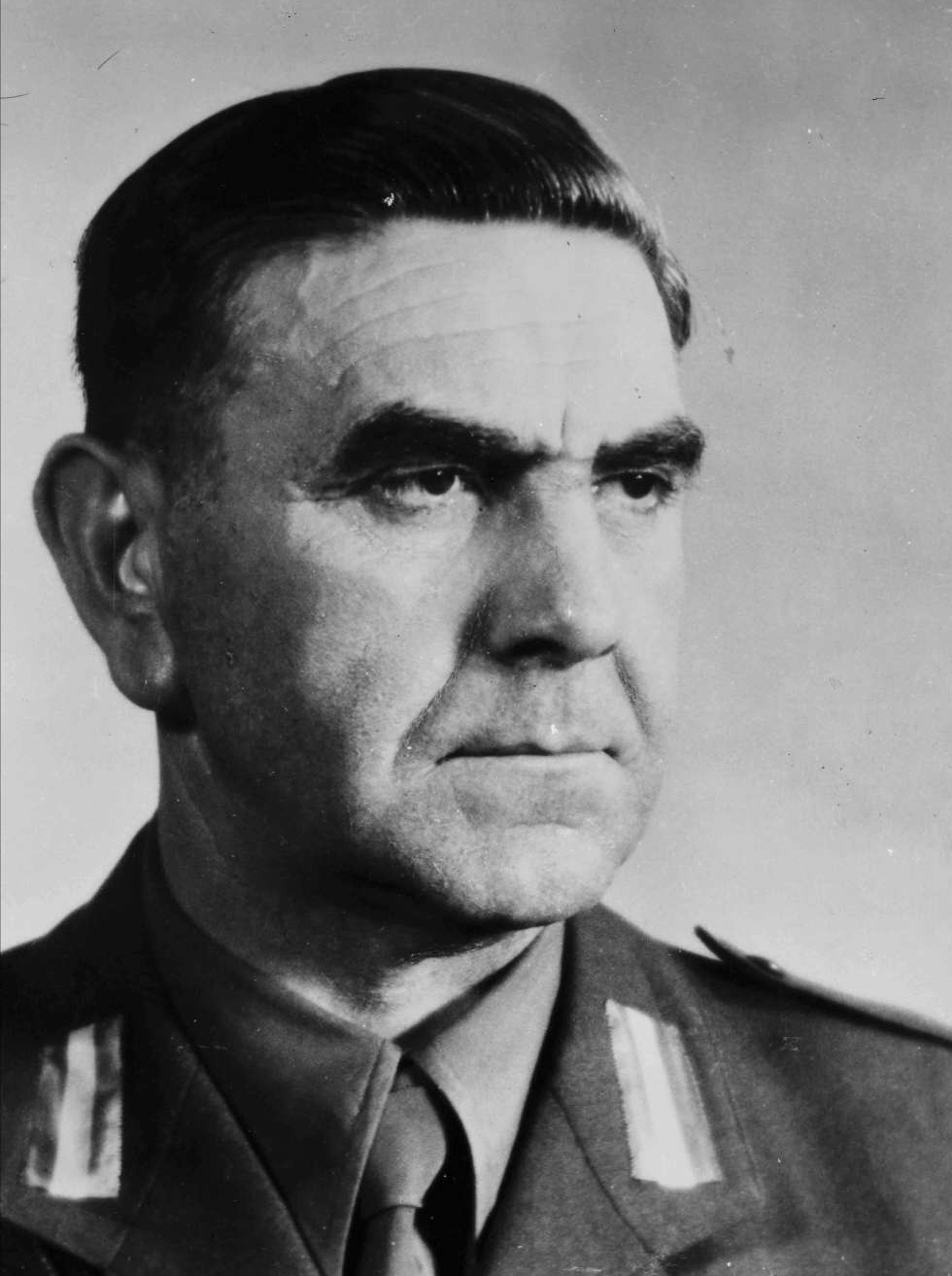
Ante Pavelić helped to start negotiations between the Croatian Bloc and the Democratic Party in 1922.

On 13 January 1922, Politika published a working draft of the Croatian Bloc's memorandum, intended as a message to Prime Minister Nikola Pašić. The draft was accepted by the Croatian Bloc's elected parliament members the next day before being formally approved on 25 February. The document declared unity in terms of foreign policy and called for an agreement on internal policy. Additionally, the Croatian Bloc called on Pašić to include Croatian experts in the Yugoslav delegation to the upcoming Genoa Economic and Financial Conference. While Radić believed that the conference would be about discussing Yugoslavia's place in the world during a global geopolitical realignment, Pašić thought of the conference as a venue to engage Italy regarding a potential resolution of the Fiume territorial dispute after the Treaty of Rapallo in 1920.

Pašić ignored the Croatian Bloc's memorandum, leading Radić to present a new memorandum to the coalition on 25 March, believing that it would help the Yugoslav delegation win a favourable deal during the negotiations with Italian diplomats. Through the memorandum, Radić demanded a truly sovereign Croatia or a Croatian state under a new constitution ensuring the establishment of a federal Yugoslavian nation. Radić intentionally avoided mentioning the official name of the Kingdom of Serbs, Croats and Slovenes within the memorandum, instead referring to it as the "internationally recognised territory of Serbs, Croats and Slovenes" to avoid referring to the nation as a monarchy. In early April, the Croatian Bloc issued a press release to further explain its policy. The document asserted the province of Dalmatia as indisputably Croatian and recognized Bosnia and Herzegovina as an essential part of the Croatian question, declaring the province's status as an issue to be resolved in a future Croat–Serb agreement. He also expressed in the memorandum that the Bunjevci people are Croats and rejected that the emigré Croatian Committee should represent Croatia or Croats.

According to historian Hrvoje Matković, the memorandums and other public declarations of early 1922 were the only public activity of the Croatian Bloc. He concluded that Radić, as the main author of all those documents, had tried to set up negotiations between himself and Pašić. The government either ignored the Croatian Bloc's activities or denounced them as acts against the state.

=== Croatian National Youth ===
The Croatian National Youth (HANAO) was established in spring of 1922 in Vukovar under the patronage of the Croatian Bloc, ostensibly to protect Croats against government-sponsored violence and the violent actions of the Organization of Yugoslav Nationalists. The HANAO, itself resorting to violence and terrorism, quickly spread from the region of Syrmia throughout Croatia as well as Bosnia and Herzegovina. The organisation became increasingly radical and had similar political positions as the HSP. The HANAO was used by the Croatian Bloc as a tool to mobilise its voters, threaten political enemies, as well as to physically protect the HRSS political rallies. The organisation's leadership gradually split into two factions: a moderate wing supporting the HRSS and a radical wing supporting the HSP.

== Dissolution ==
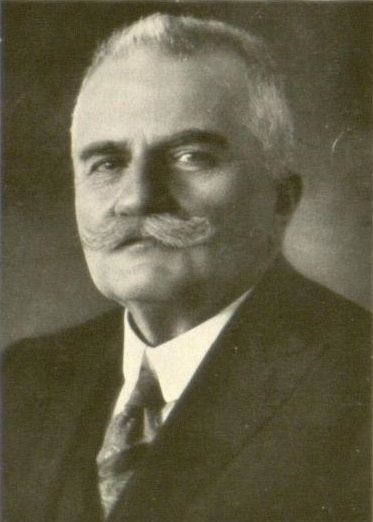
Ljubomir Davidović led the Serb-dominated Democratic Party.

The Croatian Bloc supported Radić's idea of negotiating with some Serb-dominated political parties to topple the existing government and amending the Vidovdan Constitution. Contacts were established with the Democratic Party when the HSP's Ante Pavelić brought Pavle Andjelić to Zagreb for initial talks with Radić in early November 1922. Shortly after that meeting, Drinković travelled to Belgrade with the HRSS's Juraj Krnjević and Josip Predavec, carrying Radić's letter to Democratic Party president Ljubomir Davidović. On 18 November, the HSP pulled out of the talks with Davidović. On 25 November, the HSP's leader Vladimir Prebeg informed Radić at a coalition meeting that the party now considered the Croatian question an international problem and would no longer entertain any attempt to resolve it within Yugoslavia. In response, Radić, supported by Lorković, rebuked the Party of Rights for trying to assume control over the Croatian Bloc, ejected it from the coalition, and told Prebeg, Košutić and Pavelić to leave the room immediately. Radić also resented frequent contacts between the HSP leaders and Pašić-led People's Radical Party (NRS), and interpreted it as backstabbing. He accused the HSP of being under influence of Frankist emigrés formerly organised as the Croatian Committee.

The rump Croatian Bloc outlined its conditions to Davidović and requested, among other things, three ministerial positions in a future Yugoslav government and provincial administration in Croatia-Slavonia, Dalmatia, and Bosnia and Herzegovina. On 29 November, Davidović agreed and drafted a joint statement requiring the Croatian Bloc's agreement to participate in the Yugoslav assembly even before any new elections. On 1 December, Radić replied that the Croatian Bloc would abstain from parliamentary work until the current government had a supporting parliamentary majority. Three days later, Pašić resigned as Prime Minister and new elections were called.

The Croatian Bloc continued to exist until shortly before the Yugoslav parliamentary elections held on 18 March 1923. When the election was called, the HRSS announced it would run independent of the Croatian Union, except in Zagreb, if the coalition partner would provide a candidate to the top of the ticket there, stipulating that such a candidate must publicly oppose monarchy. The Croatian Union instead announced it would not run in the election and called on its supporters to vote for the HRSS.

== Aftermath ==
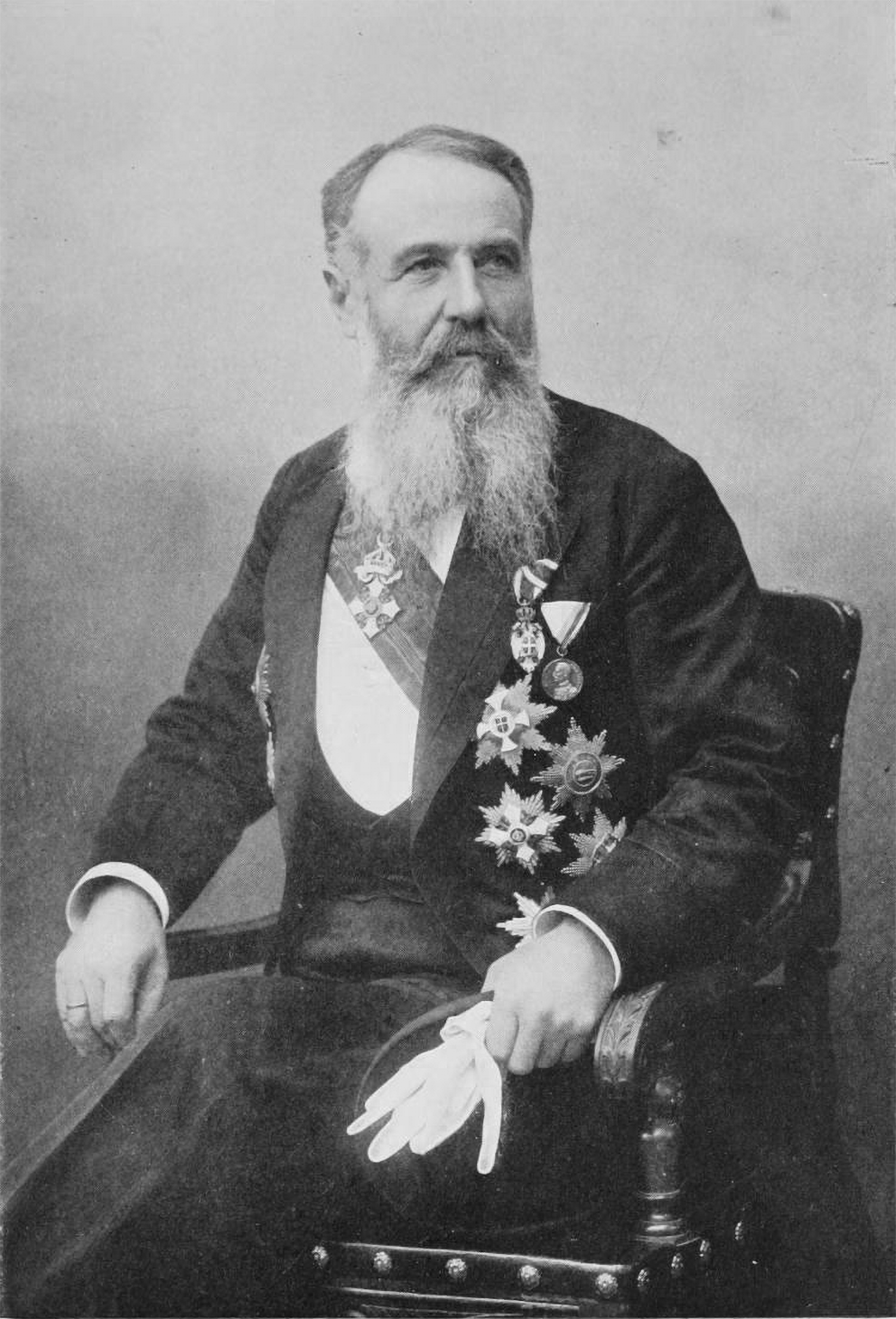
Nikola Pašić led the Serb-dominated People's Radical Party and served as the prime minister in the early 1920s.

Following the 1923 elections, the HRSS increased the number of seats it held in the national assembly from 50 to 70, while its former Croatian Bloc partners lost all of their seats. The coalition had served Radić to strengthen his position as the most popular Croatian political figure and confirm the HRSS as the only relevant political representative of Croats. At the same time, the HRSS became the second largest political party in Yugoslavia measured by the number of seats won. The Democratic Party became internally fractured as a result of its negotiations with the HRSS. A faction led by Svetozar Pribićević criticised Davidović for the move and the divisions in the party led to its defeat in the election. In 1924, Pribićević's faction ultimately broke away from the Democratic Party over cooperation with the HRSS to form the Independent Democratic Party.

The NRS maintained contacts with the Party of Rights after its ejection from the Croatian Bloc, providing it with financial assistance. At one point, it was proposed to transform the Party of Rights into the Croatian Radical Party, an ally of the ruling NRS. Numerous contacts and promises of concessions to the Party of Rights members for their alliance or joining the NRS were widely reported by the contemporary press. The cooperation was aimed at weakening the position of the HRSS. The parties discussed a potential "amputation" of Croatia, which would remove Central Croatia and Slovenia from Yugoslavia, leaving Slavonia and Dalmatia within the country and presumably solving the Croatian question. Finally, the aim of the Party of Rights–NRS cooperation was to install the Party of Rights leaders as the rulers of the rump Croatia. On 27 March 1925, Radić recognised the Vidovdan Constitution and the NRS stopped supporting the Party of Rights.

The HANAO was taken over by the Party of Rights. The move came about in 1923 after the HRSS leaders publicly distanced the party from violence, expressing their desire to pursue politics without hatred for Serbs. Subsequently, the HANAO established contacts with the Internal Macedonian Revolutionary Organization – previously rejected while under the influence or control of the HRSS.

The name of the Croatian Bloc was used for another political bloc in Yugoslavia during the interwar period, this time as a united front against Radić. The Party of Rights formed a coalition with the Ante Trumbić-led Croatian Federalist Peasant Party ahead of the 1927 Kingdom of Serbs, Croats and Slovenes parliamentary election. The two parties won one seat each – held by Pavelić and Trumbić.

== Sources ==
- Banac, Ivo (1984). The National Question in Yugoslavia: Origins, History, Politics. Ithaca: Cornell University Press. ISBN 978-0-8014-1675-0.
- Biondich, Mark (2000). Stjepan Radić, the Croat Peasant Party, and the Politics of Mass Mobilization, 1904-1928. Toronto: University of Toronto Press. ISBN 0-8020-4727-0.
- Hoare, Marko Attila (2024). Serbia: A Modern History. London: Hurst Publishers. ISBN 978-1-80526-157-5.
- Iordachi, Constantin; Miljan, Goran (2026). Radicalization and Fascism in the Ustaša: From Terrorism to Mass Violence in the Western Balkans. London: Bloomsbury Publishing. ISBN 978-1-3505-9608-5.
- Jelić-Butić, Fikreta (1977). Ustaše i Nezavisna država Hrvatska 1941–1945 [Ustaše and the Independent State of Croatia 1941–1945] (in Croatian). Zagreb: Sveučilišna naklada Liber. OCLC 462159614.
- Karaula, Željko (2008). "Hrvatska nacionalna omladina – (HANAO): prilog proučavanju djelovanja i rada hrvatskih omladinskih organizacija u Kraljevini SHS" [Croatian National Youth (HANAO). Activities of Croatian Youth Associations in the Kingdom of Serbs, Croats and Slovenes]. Historijski zbornik (in Croatian). 61 (2). Zagreb: Društvo za hrvatsku povjesnicu: 289–322. ISSN 0351-2193.
- Matković, Hrvoje (1962). "Veze između frankovaca i radikala od 1922–1925" [Links between the Frankists and the Radicals, 1922–1925]. Historijski zbornik (in Croatian). 15 (1–4). Zagreb: Društvo za hrvatsku povjesnicu: 41–59. ISSN 0351-2193.
- Matković, Hrvoje (2000). "Stjepan Radić i Hrvatski blok" [Stjepan Radić and the Croatian Block]. Radovi Zavoda za hrvatsku povijest Filozofskoga fakulteta Sveučilišta u Zagrebu: Radovi Zavoda za hrvatsku povijest Filozofskoga fakulteta Sveučilišta u Zagrebu (in Croatian). 32–33 (1). Zagreb: University of Zagreb: 267–276. ISSN 0353-295X.
- Miljan, Goran (2018). Croatia and the Rise of Fascism: The Youth Movement and the Ustasha During WWII. London: I.B. Tauris. ISBN 978-1-78831-209-7.
- Ramet, Sabrina P. (2006). The Three Yugoslavias: State-building and Legitimation, 1918–2005. Bloomington: Indiana University Press. ISBN 9780253346568.
- Veselinović, Velimir (2018). "Pregled razvoja pravaške ideologije i politike" [An Overview of the Development of Rightist Ideology and Politics]. Časopis za suvremenu povijest (in Croatian). 50 (3). Zagreb: Croatian Institute of History: 583–620. ISSN 0590-9597.
- Vucinich, Wayne S. (1969). "Interwar Yugoslavia". In Vucinich, Wayne S. (ed.). Contemporary Yugoslavia: Twenty Years of Socialist Experiment. Berkeley: University of California Press. pp. 3–58. ISBN 9780520331112.
