= Milan Bandić =

Croatian politician (1955–2021)

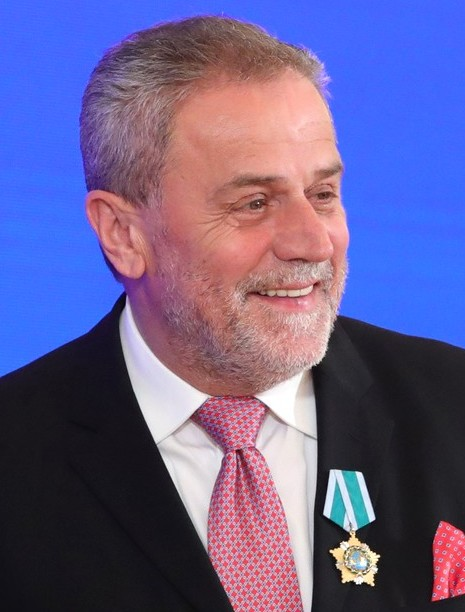
- Bandić in 2018

Mayor of Zagreb
- In office 14 June 2005 – 28 February 2021; Powers and duties suspended: 21 November 2014 – 9 March 2015
- Preceded by: Vlasta Pavić
- Succeeded by: Jelena Pavičić Vukičević (Acting); Tomislav Tomašević
- In office 2 June 2000 – 1 March 2002
- Preceded by: Marina Matulović-Dropulić
- Succeeded by: Vlasta Pavić

Deputy Mayor of Zagreb for Social Services
- In office 4 April 2002 – 14 June 2005 Serving with Stipe Tojčić
- Mayor: Vlasta Pavić
- Preceded by: Morana Paliković-Gruden; Vlasta Pavić
- Succeeded by: Ivo Jelušić; Ljiljana Kuhta Jeličić

President of the Bandić Milan 365 – Labour and Solidarity Party
- In office 28 March 2015 – 28 February 2021
- Preceded by: Position established
- Succeeded by: Jelena Pavičić Vukičević (Acting); Slavko Kojić

Personal details
- Born: 22 November 1955 Grude, PR Bosnia and Herzegovina, FPR Yugoslavia
- Died: 28 February 2021 (aged 65) Zagreb, Croatia
- Party: SKH (1980–1990); SDP (1990–2009); BM 365 (2015–2021)
- Spouses: Vesna Bandić (m. 1981; div. 1996) (m. 2003)
- Parents: Jozo Bandić; Blagica Tomić
- Education: Faculty of Political Science, University of Zagreb
- Occupation: Politician
- Profession: Teacher

Milan Bandić (22 November 1955 – 28 February 2021) was a Croatian politician and the longest-serving mayor of Zagreb, the capital of Croatia. Bandić was mayor almost continuously from 2000 to 2021, except for the time between his resignation in 2002 and the 2005 election. He was also suspended from exercising his powers and duties for several months after his 2014 arrest over a corruption scandal. Among Bandić's multifaceted engagement in politics, he was most notable as Mayor of Zagreb following the Croatian Democratic Union's (HDZ) first post-socialist period of government (1990–2000), and exacerbated many existing transitional problems in the city.

Born in the Herzegovinian town of Grude, Bandić moved to Zagreb to study to become a teacher of Marxism and Defence and Protection at the University of Zagreb. Starting in the early 1980s, he rose through the ranks of the League of Communists of Croatia and its post-1990 successor, the Social Democratic Party (SDP), becoming a city councillor in 1995 and president of the SDP's Zagreb branch in 1997. Following the 1995–1997 Zagreb crisis, he led the opposition against the imposed HDZ administration led by Mayor Marina Matulović Dropulić. Forcing snap elections in 2000, following the fall of the national HDZ government, Bandić ran for mayor with the SDP and won a plurality with 20% of the vote. He would go on to serve five more terms. In 2009, he was expelled from the SDP for running in the 2009–10 Croatian presidential election, where he competed against and lost the second round to the SDP's chosen candidate, Ivo Josipović. In 2015, he formed a new party, Bandić Milan 365 – Labour and Solidarity Party, and entered into a coalition with the HDZ. His mayoralty was fraught with scandals and interrupted twice. First time was from 2002 to 2005 when he was caught fleeing the scene of an accident he caused while drunk driving and threatening the police officer who caught him; he resigned and was kept on as deputy mayor for social services under Acting Mayor Vlasta Pavić. The second time was in 2014–15 due to prosecution in the Agram affair which was still ongoing at the time of his death. Bandić remained mayor throughout the events, but was temporarily forbidden from exercising his mayoral duties and powers, and appointed Sandra Švaljek and later Vesna Kusin as acting mayors before fully assuming his duties. Some of the scandals led to convictions of high-ranking city officials, but Bandić himself was never convicted of a felony, though he was fined for conflicts of interest.

Bandić ruled the city in a direct and highly centralised manner, devolving few to no powers to elected officials beneath him, and maintaining much control over the city during the periods when he was not in office. His politics was populist, primarily seeking support from the poor, while trying to appeal to the rest of the citizens by announcing numerous capital infrastructure projects. A few projects were realised in the mid-2000s, such as Lake Bundek renovation, construction of Arena Zagreb and Zagreb Avenue widening, as well as the long-awaited late-2010s construction of an underpass under Remetinec Roundabout. Many more were repeatedly announced but never completed, e.g. reconstruction of the Sljeme cable car, a spa in Blato, completing the long-awaited Blato University Hospital, a congress centre, and reconstructing the Maksimir Stadium. Public transport was not improved beyond renewing the tram rolling stock. Bandić's era saw an unprecedented 20 years go by without the construction of new tram lines, despite his many announcements of tram network expansions.

Bandić died of a supposed heart attack in early 2021, two months before the regular local elections, having held office for 17 years and 165 days. He was succeeded in his roles of mayor and BM 365 president by his deputy Jelena Pavičić Vukičević as acting mayor. His legacy remained controversial due to numerous nepotism and clientelism scandals – which involved many of his associates, including his successor Pavičić Vukičević – budget deficit and soon to mature bonds, and the slow and expensive recovery from the heavily damaging 2020 earthquakes. During his mayoralty, Bandić was bestowed with several honours, including honorary citizenship of Srebrenica, Bosnia and Herzegovina, and membership in the Brethren of the Croatian Dragon.

== Early life and education ==
Bandić was born on 22 November 1955 in Donji Mamići, Grude, PR Bosnia and Herzegovina, FPR Yugoslavia to Jozo Bandić and Ankica Tomić. He was a middle child, having an older brother Drago and younger sister Tonka. In 1974, he went to Zagreb, where he majored in defence and protection at the University of Zagreb. Students completing this major, which was in Zagreb taught at the Faculty of Political Science, were qualified to teach the subjects of defence and protection, foundations of Marxism, and theory and practice of socialism to high school students. As part of the class involved practical instruction in the Yugoslav People's Army, the students were exempted from mandatory military service; distinguished students were also granted the status of officer in the reserve force. Bandić states that, after finishing schooling, he served in the army, which some newspapers interpreted as mandatory military service.

In socialist Yugoslavia, Bandić joined Croatia's communist party, the League of Communists of Croatia (LCC). In 1983, he found a job in his field in LCC's Municipal Committee of Peščenica municipality of Zagreb as an expert political worker responsible for defence and protection, after previously working at the Ledo factory.. After the collapse of SFR Yugoslavia, which started the transition to capitalism, LCC rebranded itself as the Social Democratic Party of Croatia (SDP). Bandić remained with the new party. In 1993 he became the secretary of SDP's Zagreb Committee, in 1995 he joined the Zagreb Assembly, and in 1997 he became the committee's president. In 2000, Bandić bought off two HDZ councilmen, finding the necessary majority to call snap elections.

== Mayor of Zagreb ==
Following the loss of the Croatian Democratic Union (HDZ)'s majority in the Zagreb City Assembly, elections were held on 7 May 2000. Milan Bandić, then a prominent member of the Social Democratic Party (SDP), led the party's electoral list. The SDP-led coalition secured a majority in the Assembly, which elected Bandić mayor on 31 May 2000; he took office on 2 June.

Upon becoming mayor, Bandić continued his predecessor and the HDZ government's pattern of deregulation and abandonment of urban planning that began in the 1990s. Bandić's mayoralty was characterised by unsustainable projects creating unplanned investment-driven sprawl and causing overbuilding. The inconsistency and non-specificity of the general urban master plans of 2003 and 2007 allowed the private sector to take over the role of urban planning from professionals. The master plan was frequently altered to accord with private investors' interests, while citizens and urban planners had minimal participation in the projects. As a consequence, it failed to achieve its objections, and urban renewal in Zagreb was characteristic of the so-called era of the bulldozer: a discarded approach involving construction of unsustainable luxury housing on the site of former undesirable neighbourhoods and areas. The city continued an ongoing trend of losing vegetation, replacing a significant fraction of its green spaces with pavement and buildings. Bandić's administration was highly centralised, as he directly involved himself in all matters that concerned running the city. The 1999 city statute created two levels of self-government: 17 arbitrarily drawn city districts which were divided into local committees. In practice, district councils were bogged down in bureaucracy and had no effect beyond enacting plans for "small community actions", while forming of local committees only began in 2008. During the Great Recession, the city cut the funding for small community actions, effectively stopping self-governmental activity. Bandić's mayoralty reduced citizen participation to a formality, using manipulation and confrontation to marginalise citizens who disagreed with their initiatives. Bandić often confronted disagreeing citizens and participated in publicity stunts.

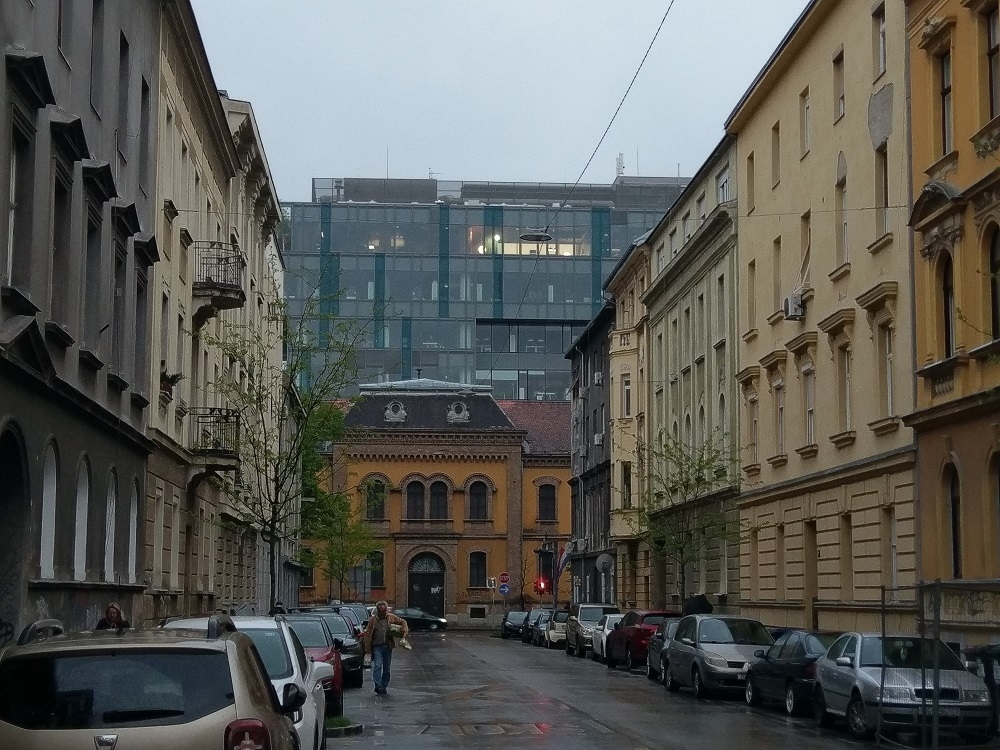
Adris grupa building looms over the Neoclassical architecture of Primorska Street

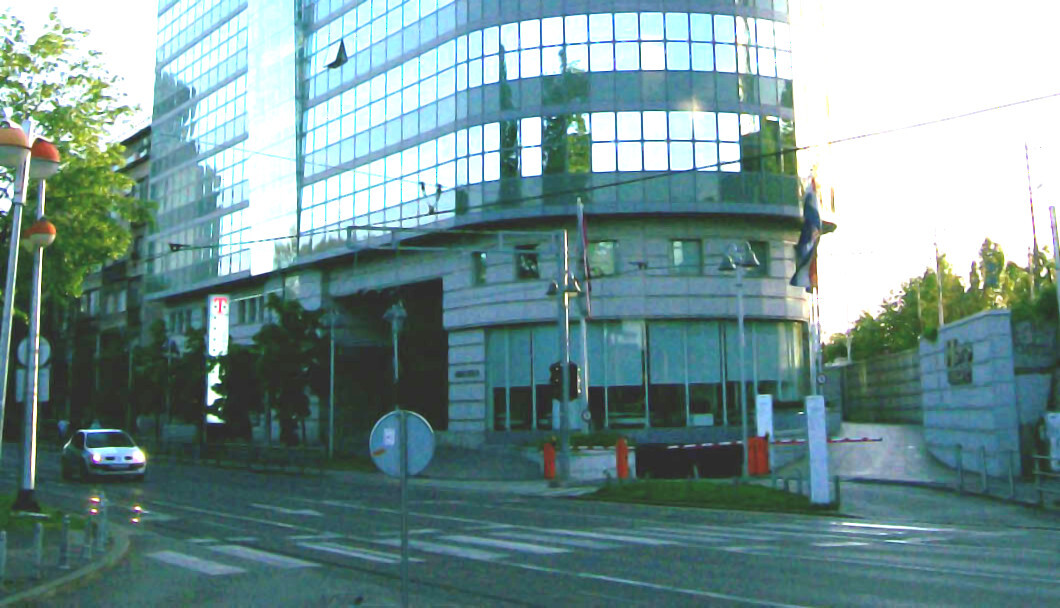
HOTO Tower breaks up the sidewalk on Savska, a major road in central Zagreb

The master plan removed a long-standing moratorium on construction of buildings over nine storeys in height. Together with lack of precision in detailed spatial plans, which were in fact abrogated for many city project areas in the 2006 plan, this state of affairs allowed new structures to arbitrarily affect the city's skyline. High-rise office towers in urban areas and dense housing projects in previously suburban areas, such as Lanište and Borovje, were built without improvements to infrastructure and corresponding amenities, causing traffic jams and overburdening of schools, hospitals and other amenities. New apartment buildings lagged behind late Communist-era housing in construction standards and amenities. In one case, poor construction standards at a building site led to the creation of a sinkhole which swallowed up one whole side of Kupska Street in Trnje.

Much of the prime development space was allocated to commercial developments, numerous shopping malls in particular, while new residential developments were relegated to less attractive and poorly connected, previously industrial areas. Among other cultural venues, Bandić made efforts to resettle Zagreb Hippodrome, Zagreb Fair and NK Lokomotiva's football stadium to clear space for real estate development. By 2006, Zagreb had over 30 shopping malls. Overbuilding and subsequent failure of shopping malls created abandoned lots in areas well supported by infrastructure. It also caused a loss of profitability and large-scale closure of small shops and crafts in the city centre, especially on Ilica, Zagreb's historical high street, and created private land out of previously public sections of streets and squares, particularly in the Donji grad pedestrian zone. Lack of interest and investment on the city's part enabled continued decay of old buildings in the city centre, making them vulnerable to purchase and conversion into luxury apartments, which attracted the rich and displaced existing middle class residents. The city centre also lost population as residents were beset by high traffic and noise pollution – the city raised allowed noise limits to 95 dB during daytime and 90 dB at night, far above Ministry of Health regulations. Bandić would repeatedly put focus on attractive perennial capital projects, while failing to improve Zagreb's aging infrastructure; in 2015, 80,000 households lacked running water and sewerage connections. Funds raised by Zagreb Holding bonds in 2007 for the purpose of improving infrastructure were almost in entirety spent on other projects, including real estate acquisition.

In the 1990s, Zagreb was hit by a spate of illegal construction. Informal settlements were created by refugees of the Yugoslav Wars, while better-off land owners built or expanded their homes without acquiring permits. Illegal building due to property speculation was most prevalent in the Medvednica Foothills, renamed Podsljeme in 1999. Construction in Podsljeme in particular was characterised by so-called "urban villas" (urbane vile), apartment buildings of up to twenty flats, densely packed into formerly green areas and often lacking basic services and facilities. In 1998, the Croatian Democratic Union's Matulović-Dropulić administration legalised all illegal developments built up to that point, with the clause that future illegal construction would be demolished. However, the problem of illegal construction intensified after Bandić came to power, expanding from the suburbs into the interiors of Donji grad city blocks. Bandić, who himself built his house without permits, defended illegal construction throughout his mayoralty, supporting an early 2010s effort by the Kukuriku coalition government to legalise over 90,000 buildings in Zagreb; yet few buildings in destitute Kozari putevi neighbourhood, where Bandić launched his career in 2000, were legalised by 2013. Some of the legalised buildings ended up preventing the construction of long-planned arterial roads in whose paths they were located.

As mayor, Bandić expressed support for the LGBT community of Zagreb. During his mandate, the city supported its best pupils through different programs, one of which was the "Profesor Baltazar" prize, established in 2018.

=== Flower Square affair ===
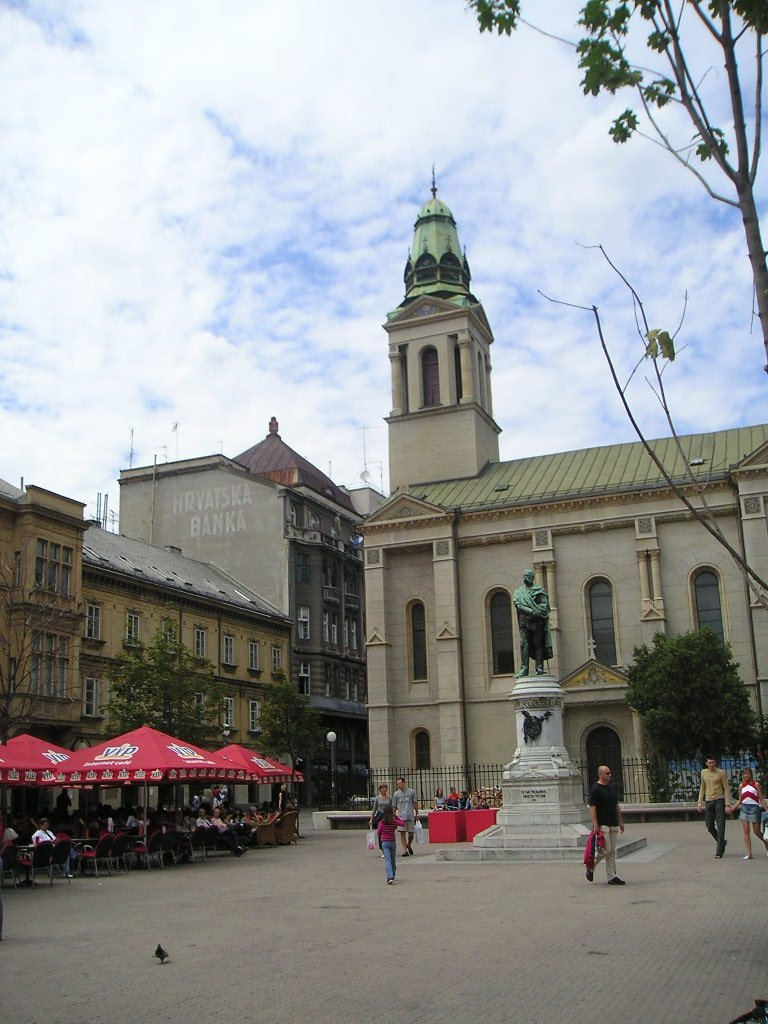
Flower Square before the shopping mall was constructed

Bandić established himself as the person in charge of all aspects of running Zagreb, becoming a spokesman for several controversial projects, one of which was the construction of a shopping mall on a historic Donji grad square. In 2006, real estate developer Tomislav Horvatinčić, who had made use of Bandić's new urban master plan to build the 17-storey HOTO Tower in 2004, presented a plan for "Life Style Center" (later to become Centar Cvjetni, "Flower Centre"), a 50,000 m^{2} (540,000 ft^{2}) mall with a 700-car underground parking garage in Zagreb's pedestrian zone, on the Petar Preradović Square, popularly known as Flower Square (Cvjetni trg). The project involved tearing down former home of Zagreb's most famous architect Hermann Bollé, the birth house of poet Vladimir Vidrić, and the Cinema Zagreb. It was opposed by the NGOs Green Action and Right to the City, as well as numerous public figures. The Serbian Orthodox Church also opposed the project, laying claim to Cinema Zagreb, which had been expropriated from the church by the post-WWII Communist government. A petition to stop the project was run, collecting over 54,000 signatures.

After initially denying the existence of the shopping mall project, Bandić supported Horvatinčić's efforts by modifying the general urban master plan. Horvatinčić attracted controversy by calling the buildings "rat holes"; the invective was picked up by the Bandić administration. In one case in 2007, Bandić publicly cursed out the protesters, singling out Right to the City leader Teodor Celakoski. Protests and lawsuits filed by the Ministry of Environmental Protection and Spatial Planning delayed and reduced the scope of the project, which at one point involved remodelling the entire city block, but ultimately failed to stop it, in large part thanks to Bandić's involvement. Notably, police cracked down on a protest in February 2010 opposing the conversion of part of Varšavska Street pedestrian zone to parking garage ramp, arresting its leaders, including Green Action president and future Mayor of Zagreb Tomislav Tomašević and actress Urša Raukar. The ramp was finished in 2011, completing the project. Further expansions of the shopping mall were prevented by a 2013 amendment to the general urban master plan. A related controversy arose temporarily in 2016, as Bandić administration allowed Horvatinčić to place a bar patio in front of the entrance to the Flower Square's Serbian Orthodox Cathedral, also hindering access to a public seating area. Bandić withdrew the permit after public pressure.

Bandić's other projects at Flower Square included an unexecuted project for canopy and floor heating in the adjoining Bogovićeva and Petrićeva Streets and closing down Cinema Europa, the home of Zagreb Film Festival, despite public protests. Bandić described the closure of the cinema as "stealing [Cinema Europa] away from tycoon privatisation." Much of Flower Square today is covered by coffee bar patios, and few flower stands remain.

=== Zagreb Housing Development Model ===
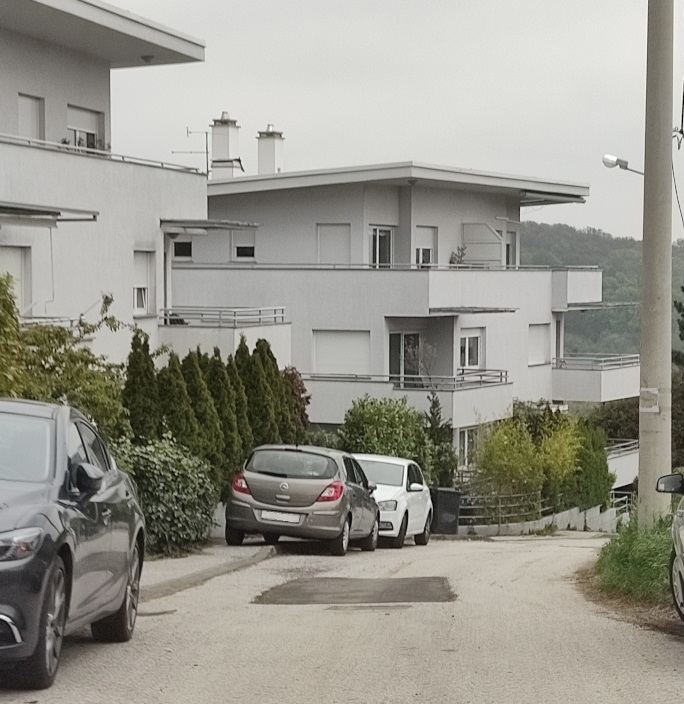
"Urban villas" and poor pedestrian infrastructure on the densely built Medvednica Foothills

At the end of the 1990s, the Croatian government began a programme of social housing called Subsidised Housing Development Programme (Program društveno poticane stanogradnje, POS), creating private-public partnerships to develop housing estates accessible to low-income residents. One POS housing estate was built in Zagreb: Špansko–Oranice, whose construction began during the mayoralty of Vlasta Pavić. Soon after Bandić's return to power in 2005, his administration bought out the government's POS projects in Zagreb, Bandić terming the city-led projects the "Zagreb housing development model" (Zagrebački model stanogradnje). Despite Bandić prominently leading social housing projects for low-income residents, few such projects eventually panned out. At the same time, a glut of higher-priced housing was created. It was estimated that only half of all new flats built privately between 2001 and 2008 had been sold by 2013.

According to urban planners, City of Zagreb's private-public partnership model was a "complete failure". Despite the fact that POS estates residents were highly content with their new housing, in large part owing to the exceedingly low quality and availability of existing affordable housing and high demand for cheap flats, only three out of nine POS estates: Špansko–Oranice, Sopnica–Jelkovec and Vrbani III were built by 2015, while the construction in a fourth one, Podbrežje, finally began in 2016, but the plan was later amended and only a few buildings were constructed by 2021. 2014 research showed that only 6.1 percent of Zagreb's residents lived in POS housing, a far lower share than in social housing projects of other European capitals. The new estates were also criticised for high flat prices rivalling those in a cheap gated community in Sveta Nedelja, Zagreb County.

The plan for Sopnica–Jelkovec estate (later renamed Novi Jelkovec) was laid out in 2003 and amended several times. The location was set in the Sesvete industrial zone, on the site of the former Sljeme pig factory, whose grounds the city purchased in 1999. The project would create a new neighbourhood on a 39.5-hectare (98-acre) area that was to be connected to the city by an extension of Vukovar Street and a new tram line, with numerous amenities such as a library, a kindergarten and a community swimming pool. Bandić associated himself publicly with the project after taking it over from the POS programme. The City of Zagreb invested 2.5 billion kuna (€300 million) into the project, whose construction began in 2006. In 2009, at the opening of the estate, Bandić announced that "we almost solved the housing problems of most of [Zagreb's] residents [who could not afford a flat]." In the next several years, the estate attained a negative reputation as none of the promised facilities and traffic connections materialised. Many of the residents were assigned flats lacking basic amenities such as internet and phone service. Bus lines were added to the neighbourhood only in 2013. An additional problem was poor construction causing water leaks. Bandić took a leading role in the allocation of flats, where inhabitants of the same social status were largely accorded flats in the same buildings, creating segregation and stunting social cohesion. Most of the problems were eventually remedied and the residents expressed satisfaction with the estate in a survey five years after its opening, but it could not shake off its initial negative reputation, leading to significant vacancy rates years after it was constructed. In 2020, the remaining apartments were offered at reduced rent rates to the Zagreb earthquake victims.

Construction of the Vrbani III estate started in 2006, after a 2004 design contest. Located near Lake Jarun, it was intended to be located between two new roads and a new park. It was also intended to feature a new kindergarten and elementary school. The amenities were only partially completed in following years, causing the residents to rely on nearby neighbourhoods for daily needs. The first flats were sold by 2006, when it came to light that some of the buildings were affected by severe tap water contamination with mineral oil concentrations over 500 times the legal allowance. Bandić was quick to dismiss the issue, lining up with mayor's office employees to drink from an affected hydrant in a publicity stunt, and assuring citizens that the problem would be remedied within days. Affected residents ended up relying for years on bottled water for all their daily needs except flushing toilets until the problem was remedied. Zagrebgradnja, Geoprojekt and Capital Ing, the companies involved in the construction of Vrbani III, were eventually found liable in court for the contamination. The city nevertheless continued to do business with the companies. Several of Bandić's associates, including Jelena Pavičić Vukičević would obtain flats in a Geoprojekt project, while Bandić himself reportedly had flats in Zagrebgradnja buildings. Zagrebgradnja and Geoprojekt were among the companies with whom Bandić conducted hundreds of unsupervised land swaps from at least 2005 until 2009, which would later be investigated by USKOK.

While not labelled part of Zagreb Housing Development Model by Bandić, Arena Zagreb and its surrounding neighbourhoods exhibited many related problems. At the onset of Great Recession, Bandić pushed for the construction of Arena Zagreb, one of several controversial handball stadiums which were opened in 2009 for the purposes of hosting the 2009 World Men's Handball Championship. The venue, which would house sports matches and concerts, drew controversy from the start, having been built at a different location and according to a different plan from the one chosen at the public tender. In addition, the costs required that it be occupied 250 days a year to break even. The arena was constructed by a private-public partnership which left the city paying for part of the arena's upkeep on top of renting it from the concessionaire, who themselves had expressed doubts in the venue's cost-effectiveness. The arena was paired with the adjacent Arena Centar shopping mall, and more construction followed in the form of Jaruščica housing estate and expansion of Lanište. Years later, the neighbourhood lacked basic amenities such as parks, schools, kindergartens and ambulatory care clinics, using up capacities of nearby older neighbourhoods. Public spaces were largely devoid of trees and instead dominated by parking lots, which were still insufficient for the needs of Arena Zagreb concertgoers, causing parking problems for residents. As part of the confidential concession agreement, the passage of Arena Zagreb into city ownership depends on regular payments of rental fees, which Bandić's administration did not service in timely fashion.

=== Transport infrastructure ===
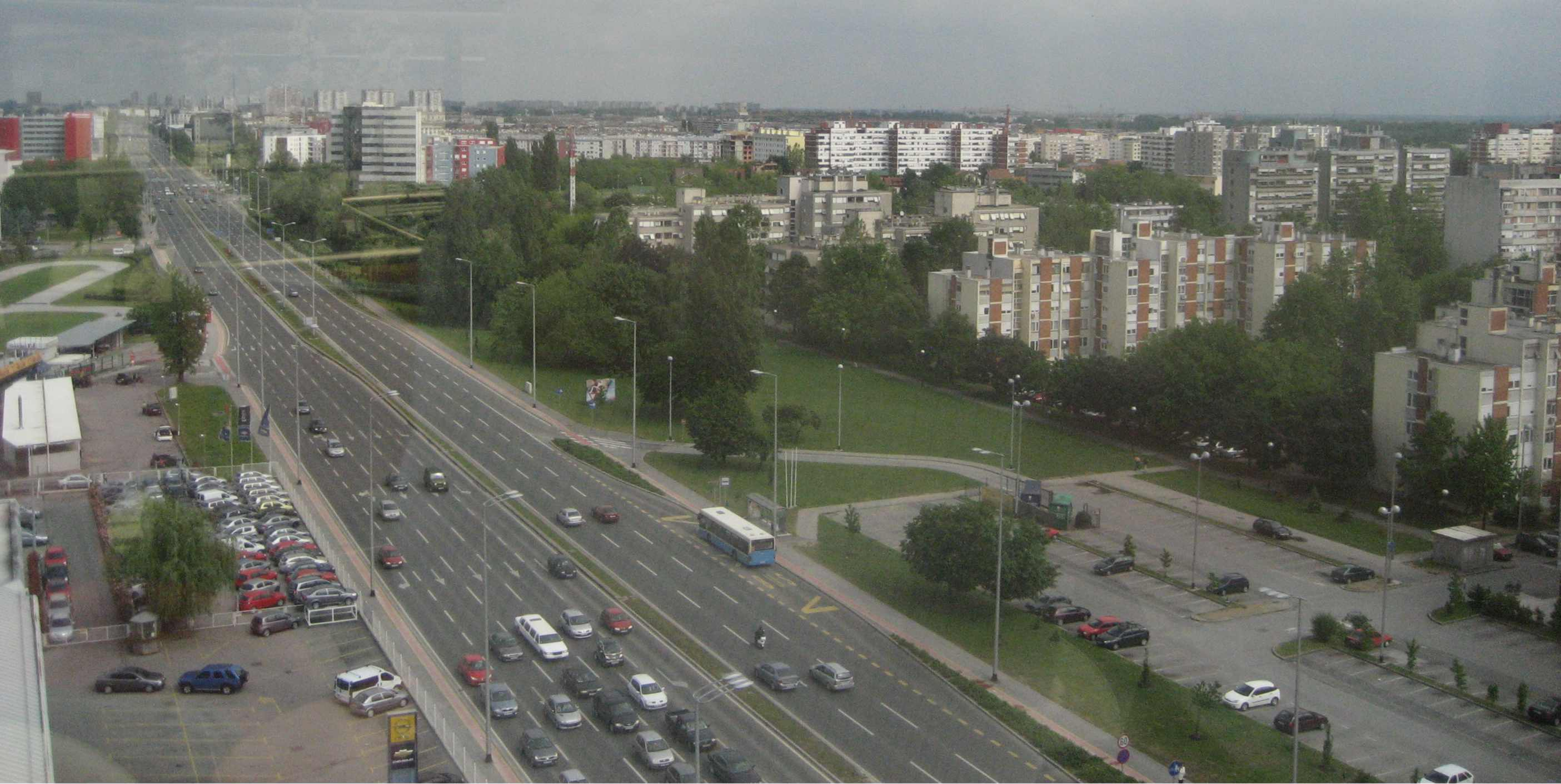
Renovated Zagreb Avenue

Bandić frequently talked about the state of transport infrastructure in Zagreb, regularly announcing numerous capital infrastructure projects, which would allegedly remedy traffic problems in Zagreb. Some of these were urban motorways through densely populated Medvednica Foothills, a tunnel under the Medvednica that would connect Zagreb with Zagorje various tunnels and underpasses in the historic city centre, extensions of numerous arterial roads, such as Branimir Road and Prisavlje and building several new bridges over Sava near Jarun and Bundek.

A few projects were carried out: widening part of Ljubljana Avenue (which Bandić subsequently in a populist move renamed Zagreb Avenue), Radnička Road and Jankomir Bridge, and constructing Homeland Bridge and overpasses or underpasses at several high traffic junctions such as Remetinec Roundabout. A few new stretches of arterial roads were built, including filling a one-kilometre gap in Branimir Road, which took place from 2005 to 2016. Many projects were criticised for the poor quality of execution, such as an underpass which continued to flood regularly during rainfall despite specific repairs to that end, and the inconsistently marked cycling paths.

In 2016, the city renovated the pedestrian Sava Bridge, and in 2018 began works to renovate Liberty Bridge. In 2019, Sava Bridge was closed after a part of the pavement fell through onto the embankment below. Bandić said the bridge was safe and would be repaired within days. However, the failed pavement remained closed to traffic until the end of Bandić's mayoralty, at which time it was scheduled to be opened in 2022. After finishing the Liberty Bridge renovation in December 2019, the city began the renovation of Youth Bridge; this was also Bandić's last announcement of imminent works on his perennial Jarun Bridge project. The Liberty Bridge renovation was criticised by the Ministry of Construction and Spatial Planning for only renovating asphalt and railings instead of carrying out repairs to the dangerously corroded bridge structure.

==== Public transport ====
Most of Bandić's involvements in transport infrastructure concerned car traffic. For instance, while the cycling infrastructure was expanded, it was still fragmentary and cycling rate lagged behind other European capitals, despite Zagreb having one of the smallest shares of car traffic in the commute modal split. Although Bandić announced numerous new lines in the core of Zagreb's public transport, its tram network, his administration did not realise any of these projects, leading to an unprecedented 20-year drought in tram line construction. In 2000, Bandić opened two new tram lines, Dubrava–Dubec and Jarun–Prečko, construction of which was finished during the previous mayor's term. These remained the last new tram tracks in the city. The Prečko turning circle remains marred by a property dispute, which at one point occasioned a temporary closure. In 2007, the city announced construction of seven new tram lines "over the next few years", including lines in Trešnjevka, Lanište, Dubrava, and the never realised Jarun Bridge, two different lines to Zagreb Airport, as well as proposals for further tram lines in Trnje and on the never built Vatikanska Street extension. Bandić would announce construction on many of these lines again until the end of his mayoralty. Further tram lines and other projects, such as reconstructing the tram storage yard or an intermodal terminal at Sava Bridge, were announced, but no such plans came to fruition by the end of the mayoralty. When one of the perennial airport tram projects was brought up by news media in 2019, Bandić denied he proposed it. On multiple occasions since the mid-2000s, Bandić had presented plans for a subway network; in 2014, the plan involved a 17-kilometre (11 mi) light rail line to be finished by 2017. Subway plans were revived after the 2020 earthquake, "so that trams would not cause vibrations [in the apartments]" of the residents in damaged city centre buildings, per Bandić.

In the early 2000s, the City of Zagreb selected Crotram's TMK 2200 as the lowest bid for conversion of Zagreb tram rolling stock to low-floor vehicles; the first trams were announced during Pavić's mayoralty. Bandić pushed for the purchase of TMK 2200s, which came to dominate the rolling stock with 140 units by 2010. Though he announced and lobbied for plans to sell Crotram units in a number of European cities, including Stockholm, Sofia and Helsinki, the deals all fell through, with Helsinki residents finding the test units "cramped and noisy", while Osijek, the other Croatian city with a tram network, found imported trams to be cheaper. In 2017, wheelchair ramps were installed in the low-floor trams, since the tram floors did not line up with platforms.

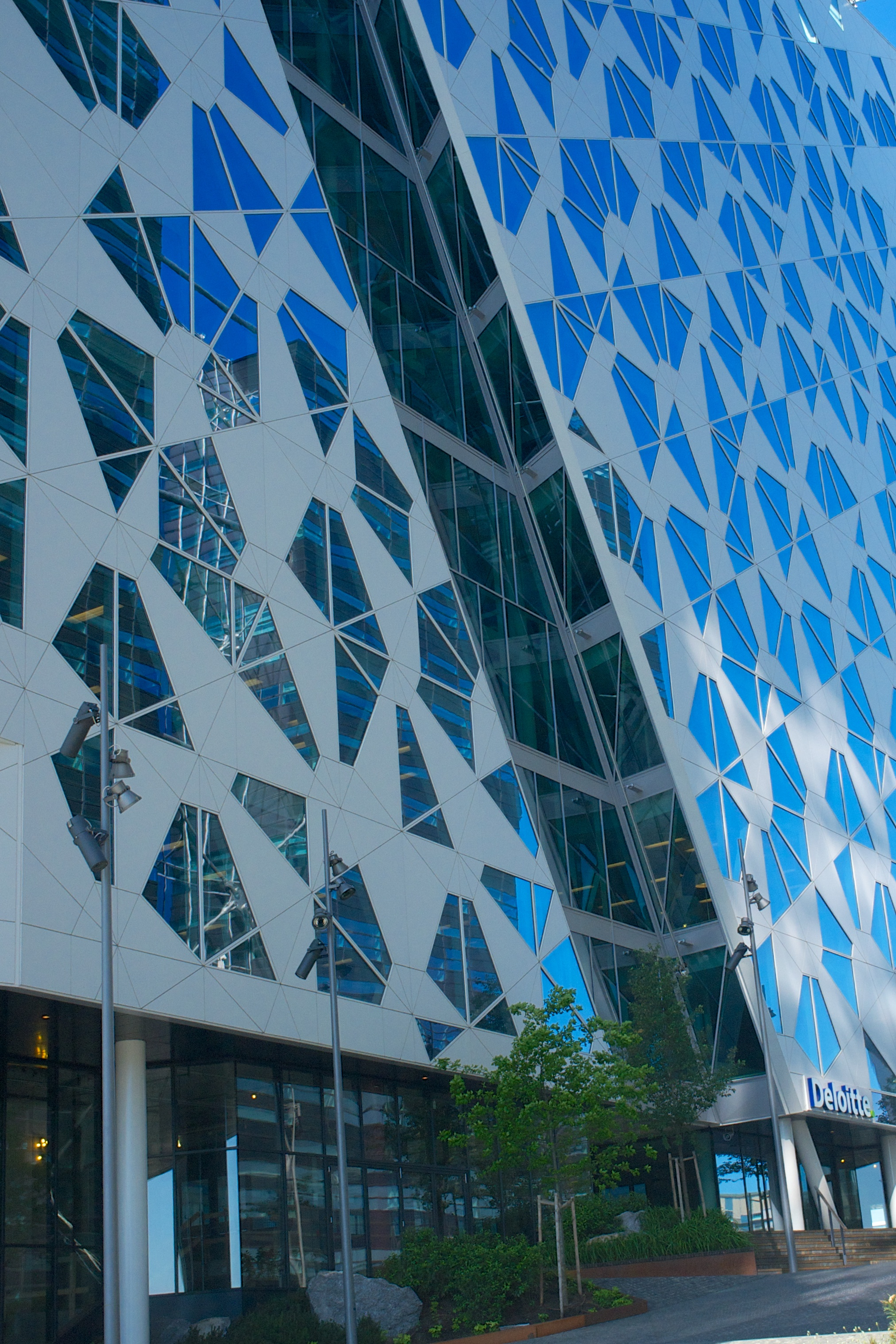
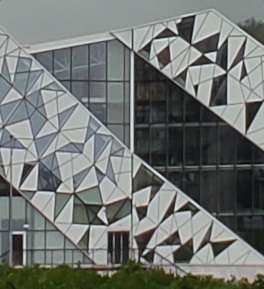
Comparison of Deloitte building in Oslo (left) and new Sljeme cable car terminal in Gračani (right)

One of Bandić's long-running projects was the reconstruction of the Sljeme cable car. The original Sljeme cable car was opened by Mayor Pero Pirker in 1963. After long calling into question the safety of the cable car, Bandić closed the cable car in 2007 after the failure of an electric motor. In 2008, plans were announced for a new, higher capacity cable car to be opened in 2009. Money continued to be spent on the project, which eventually expanded to a €45 million scheme which would have included an extension with Zagorje at Bistra. Eventually, construction began in 2019 and only on the original cable car's route, while Bandić announced a new tram line under Medvednica, which was also not realised. The cable car was to be opened in 2020, but the opening was pushed back several times, including for "strengthening steel reinforcements" after the Petrinja earthquake. Bandić was criticised by the opposition for continuing with the expensive project after the devastating March 2020 earthquake. A legal expert also characterised the cable car terminal as a plagiarism of the Deloitte building in Oslo, Norway. The city announced that they would apply for EU funding to finance the cable car. ZET took out a 537 million kuna (€72 million) long-term loan to finance the project. The cost overruns included some highly overpriced construction materials, totalling at 0.4 percent under the limit which would require additional legal oversight. Bandić disavowed responsibility for the overruns, saying the causes were outside his control. As of 2021, the cost overruns were under investigation by USKOK following a 7-hour YouTube video by a pseudonymous whistleblower, and the cable car remained under construction.

==== Parking garages and square remodelling ====
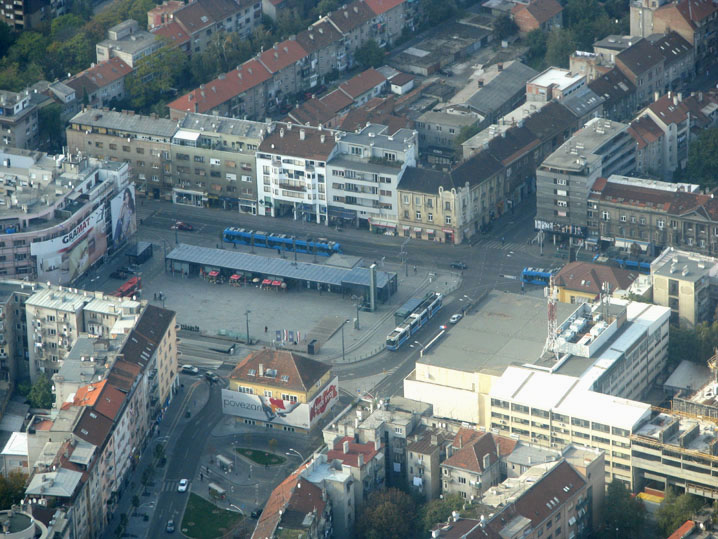
Kvaternik Square after remodelling.

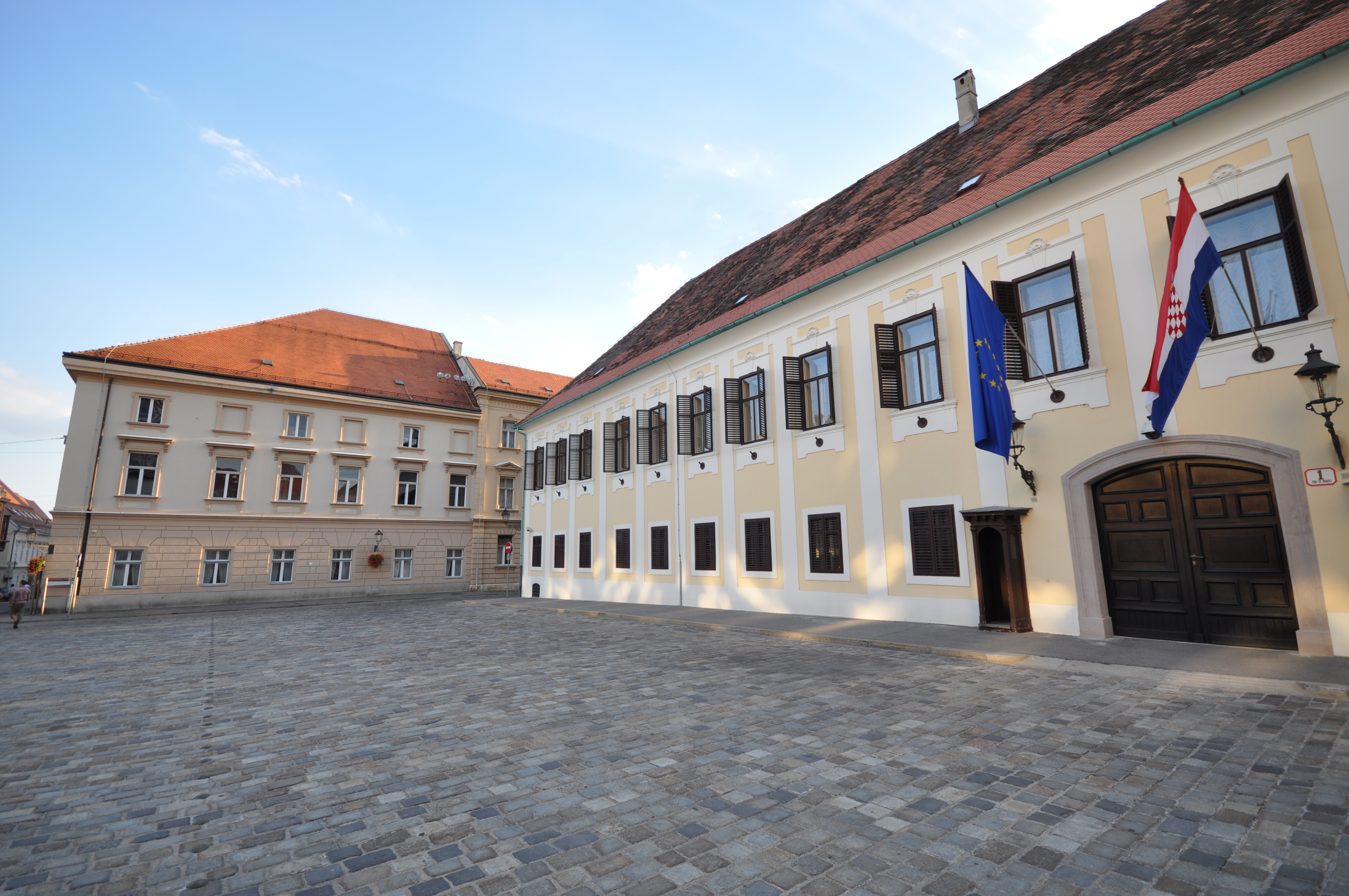
St. Mark's Square was repaved in the late 2000s by leftover tram track paving stones.

In an attempt to alleviate traffic problems, the city built a number of parking garages in the early 2000s. Garages were built under Lang and Kvaternik Squares, drastically changing their appearance. In the latter case, the garage came to dominate a larger plan for a makeover of Kvaternik Square, which followed the removal of its popular farmers' market. In order to accommodate car traffic, highly trafficked zebra crossings were replaced with underground walkways. The new square was widely criticised as it became unattractive to pedestrians and consequently remained empty. A survey found the new Kvaternik Square to be the most unpleasant square in Zagreb. Some reconstruction and renovation projects were also criticised for shoddy workmanship. For example, the controversial British Square remodelling created a roundabout too narrow to be traversed by the city buses, while the fountain in its centre sprayed water on a nearby bus station (this particular remodelling was investigated by USKOK). The Homeland Monument on Stjepan Radić Square, unveiled in December 2020, was showing material wear within five months of its construction. The effect of these remodellings has been described as an "elimination of squares".

An early 2000s plan for a public parking garage for visitors of Children's Hospital Zagreb under the Elipsa High School Sports Ground behind Mimara Museum ballooned into a – later abandoned –310 million kuna (€43 million) private-public partnership project with an attached shopping mall. An alternative deemed more attractive by the Zagreb leadership was a garage under the Republic of Croatia Square. Bandić lobbied for the controversial project, which involved pedestrian entrances surrounding Ivan Meštrović's Well of Life, while garage ramps would flank the 19th-century Croatian National Theatre building. Late 2000s plans called for three further garages in the vicinity of Flower Square and one under Strossmayer Square, as well as 16 more inside various Donji grad blocks. Most of these plans were abandoned after opposition by art history societies and intervention by courts, the Ministry of Culture as well as SDP party leadership. One planned garage was constructed as a private venture within Centar Cvjetni (see § Flower Square affair). In 2010, the Zagreb Assembly enacted an ordinance against parking garages in Donji grad, effectively putting an end to the developments, although Bandić and Zagrebparking officials continued to toy with the idea of a garage under the theatre for several years afterwards. The spatial arrangement of the constructed garages (e.g. the close by Cvjetni Centar and Tuškanac garages) caused low occupancy at some of the garages while other parts of the neighbourhood lack adequate parking facilities. Several garages are located at the fringes of the central pedestrian zone; despite their original intent to alleviate congestion, they themselves have caused traffic jams and the increase of traffic in the city core.

In late 2017, the city authorities started removing trees surrounding the Meštrović Pavilion in the middle of the Square of the Victims of Fascism, prompting protests against Bandić's administration led by a citizens' initiative named Vratite magnoliju ("Bring Back the Magnolia"). The plan would see removed several old magnolias among many other trees and bushes, reducing the greenery around the Pavilion to a plain grass lawn. Bandić and another city official were prosecuted for damaging cultural heritage and other accusations regarding the square remodelling. The trees, some of which constituted protected city heritage and fixtures of Zagreb pop culture, were removed while the process was ongoing by the city authorities; some of the trees were reportedly "diseased", and some "overgrown", while the project documentation was contradictory on the others. The makeover also included removing Brač limestone steps and replacing them with concrete. At the end of the process, Bandić was found not guilty, and subsequently taunted protestors by cutting grass on the square while dressed in the uniform of Zrinjevac, the city's park maintenance company, which caused them to demand his resignation. The city administration also removed benches and placed signs forbidding walking on the green surfaces. While a few academics supported the square makeover, most were opposed, including architectural, landscaping and art history societies. The makeover polarised the public, leading to "guerrilla" tree planting actions suppressed by the police, the result was that the citizens much less often frequented or stopped at the square. The renewed square's "cold monumentality" has been compared to the architecture of totalitarian and fascist Independent State of Croatia, which had cleared part of the square in 1941–42 while converting the pavilion to a mosque.

In 2013, the city changed the zoning of the sole park in Savica neighbourhood in order to accommodate a plan to build a church in the park. Protests, which were ongoing by 2016, intensified in 2017, the election year, by which point Savica residents and activists held round-the-clock sit-ins to prevent construction crews from entering the park. A 2016 survey found that the vast majority of Savica residents were opposed to the project, including 72 percent of Catholic residents. Two weeks before the elections, Bandić promised that the project would be stopped and called for an end to protests. The Ministry of Environmental Protection and Spatial Planning refused to issue a location permit for building the church, and it appeared that the project, which would have placed the church in the most wooded area of the park, was cancelled. Nevertheless, it was renewed in 2018 after Bandić secured another term and began supporting the project. In 2019–20, while Bandić was attempting to pass a new general urban master plan, the church project was expanded to incorporate a shrine dedicated to Blessed Alojzije Stepinac and plans for pilgrim tourism which would have caused the removal of the entire park. The new master plan failed in the city assembly, and several months later the park was given a name; there were no further attempts to build in the park as of Bandić's death. The success of the Savica park protests was seen as a potential end to unchallenged decision making by Bandić and the city government.

=== City finances ===
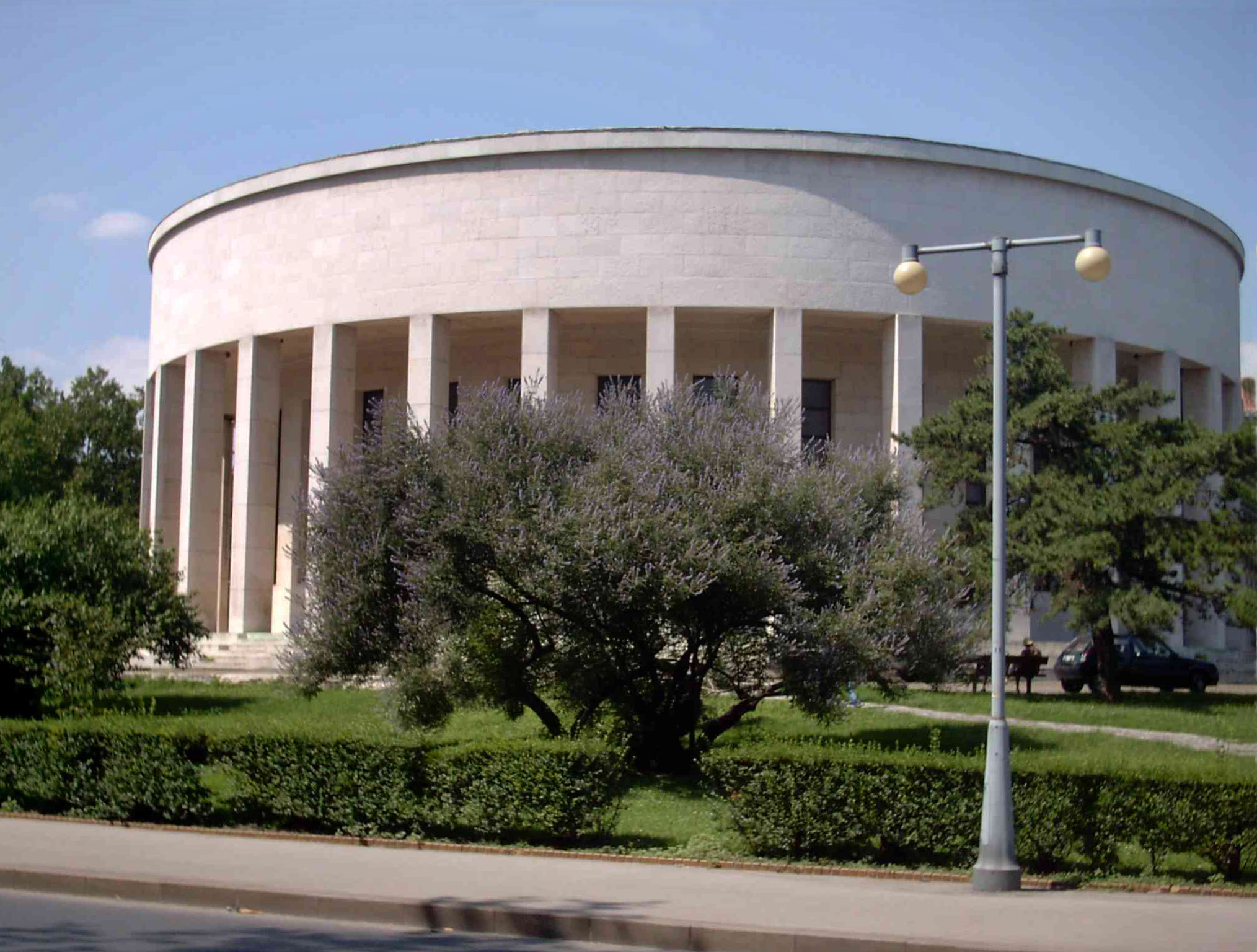
Magnolia trees in front of the Meštrović Pavilion, 2005.

Bandić's mayoralty saw Zagreb's city budget increase from 3.8 billion Croatian kuna in 1998 to 13.7 billion kuna in 2021. During his mayoralty, Bandić controlled the allocation of around 177 billion kuna (€24 billion) in budgets.

On 1 January 2007, Bandić founded the Zagreb Holding, placing city companies under a single corporate umbrella, of which he maintained full control as the sole board member until a 2009 intervention by the Ministry of Public Administration. The holding took up some of the city's responsibilities, such as building schools and kindergartens, and sold and leased back city's property, such as trams, to finance projects. In 2007, the company issued €300 million in bonds on the London Stock Exchange, purportedly to finance improvements to water, sewerage and gas network. The sewerage network in particular was severely outdated. Central Zagreb depends on an 1892 combined sewer system which would later disastrously fail in the 2020 flash flood. Little of the money was spent on the intended purpose, being re-routed into patching up the city budget, real estate acquisition, and Sopnica–Jelkovec construction, although Bandić had vouched this would not happen when the bonds were issued. A 2013 paper called for restructuring Zagreb Holding, finding that the company was exposed to high foreign exchange risk and relied on new loans to pay off existing debts. In 2011, Zagreb Holding raised 1 billion kuna in short-term loans and used it to pay off debts. When the London bonds matured in 2016, Zagreb Holding was unable to make the payments and raised the funds by issuing a new series of bonds in the Croatian bond market. Reportedly, Holding leaders already planned to refinance in 2007. In 2017, Zagreb Fair and long-time loss-leader Zagrebački električni tramvaj (ZET) were separated from Zagreb Holding. ZET, the public transport company, operated at a loss for a long time due to Bandić's decision to allow free travel for most Zagreb citizens, and was criticised for practices such as giving a commission to drivers selling tickets. In the course of the separation, Zagreb Holding controversially retained part of ZET's assets, including a workers' holiday resort, which it sold in 2020, prompting a protest by the workers.

Research carried out by Corruption Research Center Budapest (CRCB) into City of Zagreb and Zagreb Holding found the city to be the worst among European capitals in corruption risks and public tender competition. In the 2011–2016 period, more than a third of the contracts awarded by the two entities had only one bidder, covering billions of Croatian kunas. CRCB estimated that the social loss to the entities due to inefficient pricing over this period was 2.70 billion kuna. Zagreb Holding's tenders were the most inefficient in 2013, while City of Zagreb's were in 2016, both years close to local elections. Using Benford's law, CRCB found high price distortions compared to true market value of services rendered, especially in no-competition tenders and those issued by Zagreb Holding. The tenders were mainly won by companies with high presence in the public procurement market and low international export turnover. The city also poorly utilised EU funding, below average for both Croatia and comparable European capitals. While Vodoopskrba i odvodnja, Zagreb Holding's water management company, announced it would spend 1.4 billion kuna (€200 million) from EU funds in 2014, it only received 4.5 million kuna (€600,000).

In 2014, Bandić and a number of high-ranking Zagreb Holding and city officials were arrested, one of them while attempting to flee Croatia. The case was dubbed Agram affair by the press. The mayor was charged with evading tax on political donations, illegal preferential treatment of the CIOS refuse management company, as well as trading city-owned land below market price. Bandić was bailed out a month later. His bail, set at a record 15 million kuna (€2 million) was paid by the same law firm which was retained by the city; Bandić was later fined 30,000 kuna for this conflict of interest. Bandić was returned to jail in 2015 after attempting to influence a witness, but was released after a month. Bandić did not resign from his post; instead, the city was led by acting mayor and former Bandić's deputy Sandra Švaljek between Bandić's first and second arrest. The latter coincided with Bandić's successful appeal to the legal ban from exercising his office. Švaljek continued leading the city for a short period until Bandić rescinded her authorisation from jail, and gave it to Vesna Kusin. Soon after his release, Bandić returned to the mayor's post. At the time of Bandić's death, he was being tried in several court cases, including the case of the aforementioned Agram affair, the "stands affair" involving alleged preferential treatment of politician Željka Markić's anti-abortion rally, a case involving the Zagreb wastewater treatment plant, and others. Several high-ranking officials in Bandić's administration were convicted of illegally altering the general urban master plan, and received suspended prison sentences.

=== Undeveloped properties ===
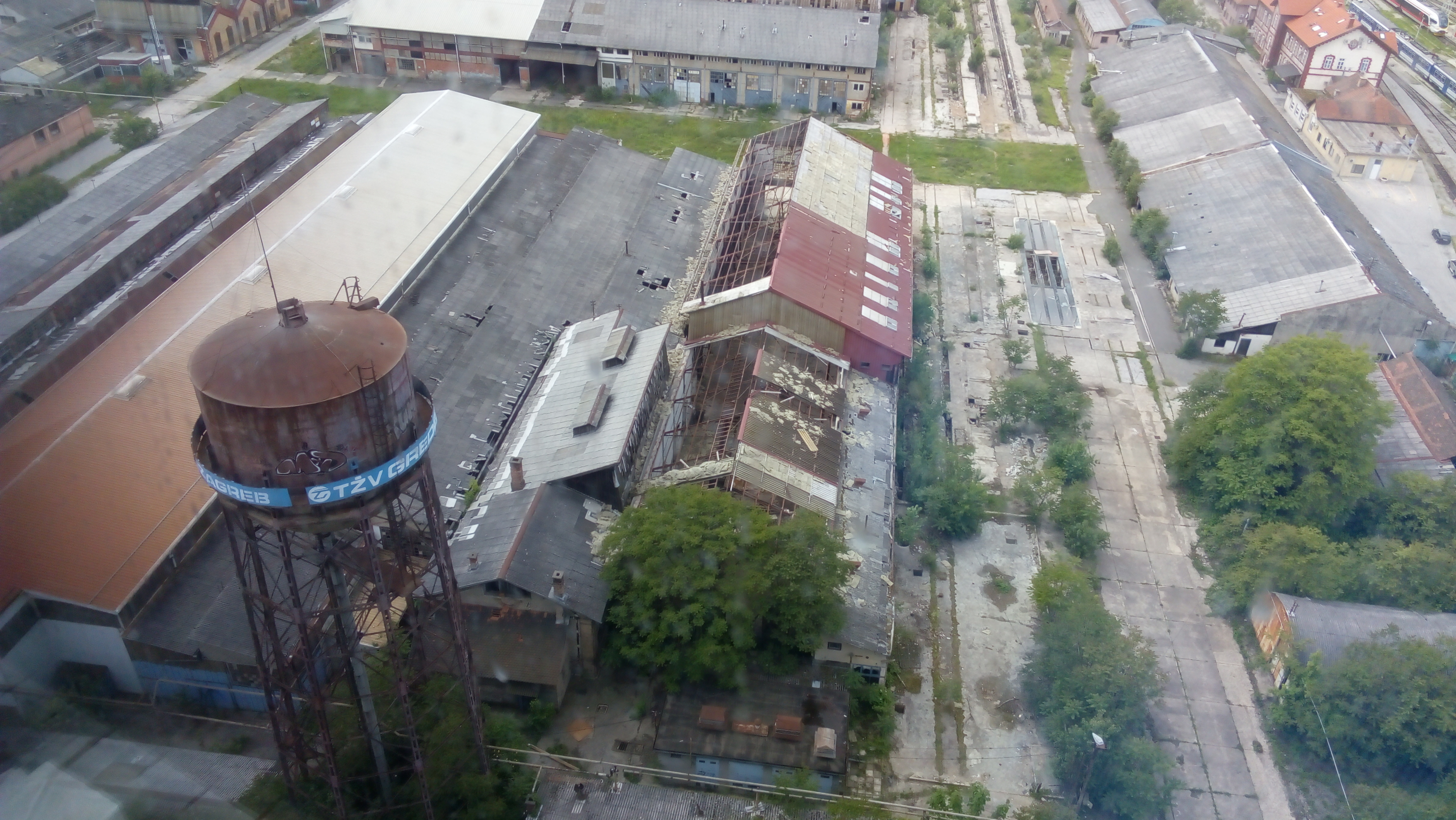
Gredelj factory grounds in 2016

During Bandić's mayoralty, the city acquired several brownfield properties which proved impossible to sell or develop. In April 2004, then-mayor Vlasta Pavić criticized Bandić for buying land formerly owned by the Zagrepčanka meat packing plant, as the city was unable to register itself as the owner. The controversy was dubbed "the Zagrepčanka case" by the newspapers. Pavić distanced herself from Bandić, and Bandić was heard cursing her during a session of the Assembly. Backed by SDP members in the City Assembly, Bandić launched a newspaper advertisement in support of his decision to buy the lot. Charges were brought against Bandić and others involved over the advertisement and "frequent and inadmissible attacks on [...] the court". Three years later, Bandić was acquitted; the City of Zagreb was awarded ownership of the Zagrepčanka lot in a court judgment. Bandić promised a new business district in the Zagrepčanka location. However, in 2021, the city was still hoping to balance the budget by selling the undeveloped lot.

A number of similarly derelict former factories exist in the streets around the Main Railway Station. Among a number of similar cases was that of former Janko Gredelj railway factory at the Main Railway Station. Zagreb Holding bought the closed factory from Gredelj in 2006 for 660 million kuna, a sum raised by issuing bonds. Years later, Bandić announced a plan to have the city buy the grounds from Zagreb Holding, in order to help Zagreb Holding pay off its debts. In 2006, most of the old factory was taken off the cultural heritage register while Bandić announced plans for a "new city centre". No construction has been done on Gredelj grounds, which remain occupied by decaying unmaintained buildings except for a small city-operated parking lot opened in 2018. Paromlin is another former factory complex and protected industry heritage in city ownership, located adjacent to Gredelj and the railway station. A 2006 deal to preserve the complex and use it to house a Marriott Hotel and a 2012 project to house the Main City Library both failed. In 2011, a part of the complex was razed and turned into a public parking lot. Part of Paromlin collapsed in 2013, while a different part was illegally demolished in 2014. Of the 2013 collapse, Bandić said that "if [he] had been born earlier, [he] would have created a [...] renovation project in time."

In 2007, Zagreb purchased the Potsdam Tin Theatre (German: Blechbüchse, Croatian: Potsdamsko limeno kazalište). The prefabricated theatre was bought for €80,000 and 18 million kuna (€2.4 million) was spent transporting it to the city. Despite a proposal to place it in Središće, New Zagreb, the city decided to erect the theatre at the district's outskirts in Sloboština. The Sloboština lot was bought from a private company in exchange for a lot in Trešnjevka and 12 million kuna (€1.6 million). The theatre was never assembled, and by 2015, many of its parts had been reportedly stolen.

=== Environment ===
In the mid-2010s, during the fourteen-year project of widening Radnička Road, part of the main wastewater canal (previously an open sewer) was covered and sewerage was built in Kozari putevi, one of a number of illegally built neighbourhoods in the Žitnjak area. In the 2000s, Bandić had based his campaign in Žitnjak informal settlements.

One of Bandić's perennial promises was closing the Jakuševec landfill, an ecological hazard to the city which was at times closed due to strikes, suffered from plastic waste fires, and which was at one time operated without a licence. After a strike by local residents, Bandić exempted them from an ordinance forbidding raising livestock in the city. The Jakuševec hazard was not solved by the end of Bandić's mayoralty. In the late 2010s, the city was beset by numerous fires, some allegedly intentionally started, at the private CIOS landfill, implicated in the Agram affair.

In 2018, Bandić presented a project which would mandate an allegedly newly invented form of HHO cleaning of car engines for all vehicles in Zagreb at cost to owners, in order to reduce their carbon footprint. Proof of the project's usefulness did not surface and the project was eventually pulled after criticism from engineering experts.

=== Political street renaming and monuments ===
In the early 1990s, the new post-Communist government began renaming a series of streets, returning many pre-1941 street names, but also giving some streets new names. The most controversial rename was that of the Square of the Victims of Fascism, which was named Croatian Nobles Square. After SDP came to power in 2000, the square's pre-1990 name was returned, while the new name was transferred to the nearby Stock Market Square. Though the wave of renames almost completely subsided after 1995, Bandić administration also took a leading role in a few high-profile cases of street renaming. In 2008 he opposed protests calling for renaming Marshal Tito Square, named after Yugoslavia's long-time Communist leader Josip Broz Tito, to its erstwhile name Theatre Square, saying that there were "no historical reasons to change [its] name". Nevertheless, in 2017 he proposed a successful motion to change its name to Republic of Croatia Square. Branko Lustig, a Croatian Jewish film producer and member of Bandić's party, was removed from his seat in Zagreb Assembly by Bandić after he refused to support the motion.

In 2006, a movement emerged to name a square after the first president of the Republic of Croatia, Franjo Tuđman. Right-wing supporters of Tuđman proposed renaming various major squares after Tuđman, while left-wing opponents proposed the long meadow in the wide central reservation of Croatian Fraternal Union Street. Bandić, who multiple times stated that Tuđman would get the "most beautiful square in Zagreb because he deserves it", ultimately gave the president the hitherto unnamed park behind Rudolf barracks, a move criticised by the right. The park was initially intended to be remodelled into an urban square with a water park and pavilion with shops and restaurants, creating per Bandić, "the second heart of the city". Bandić later fielded a proposal to build a road interchange there in order to speed up car traffic in the city centre. The projects were not carried out. In 2015, after forming a coalition with HDZ, Bandić ardently supported their plan to rename Zagreb Airport after Tuđman. Tuđman's bust was eventually erected on the median of CFU Street, where Bandić had in 2012 placed a number of controversial fountains.

Another 2006 controversy erupted over the 150th anniversary of the birth of scientist Nikola Tesla, which Bandić celebrated by "erecting" Ivan Meštrović's statue of Tesla, which was relocated from its original position at the Ruđer Bošković Institute (RBI) to Tesla Street in Donji grad. Various institutions, including RBI, the Academy of Fine Arts, and Ivan Meštrović Museum, stated that the decision went against the wishes of Meštrović. The sculptor had strongly intended that the sculpture be shown paired with a statue of Bošković at the RBI, going as far as to destroy the moulds to prevent replication of the statues. The return of the statue was the subject of an unsuccessful petition in 2013.

=== 2020 ===
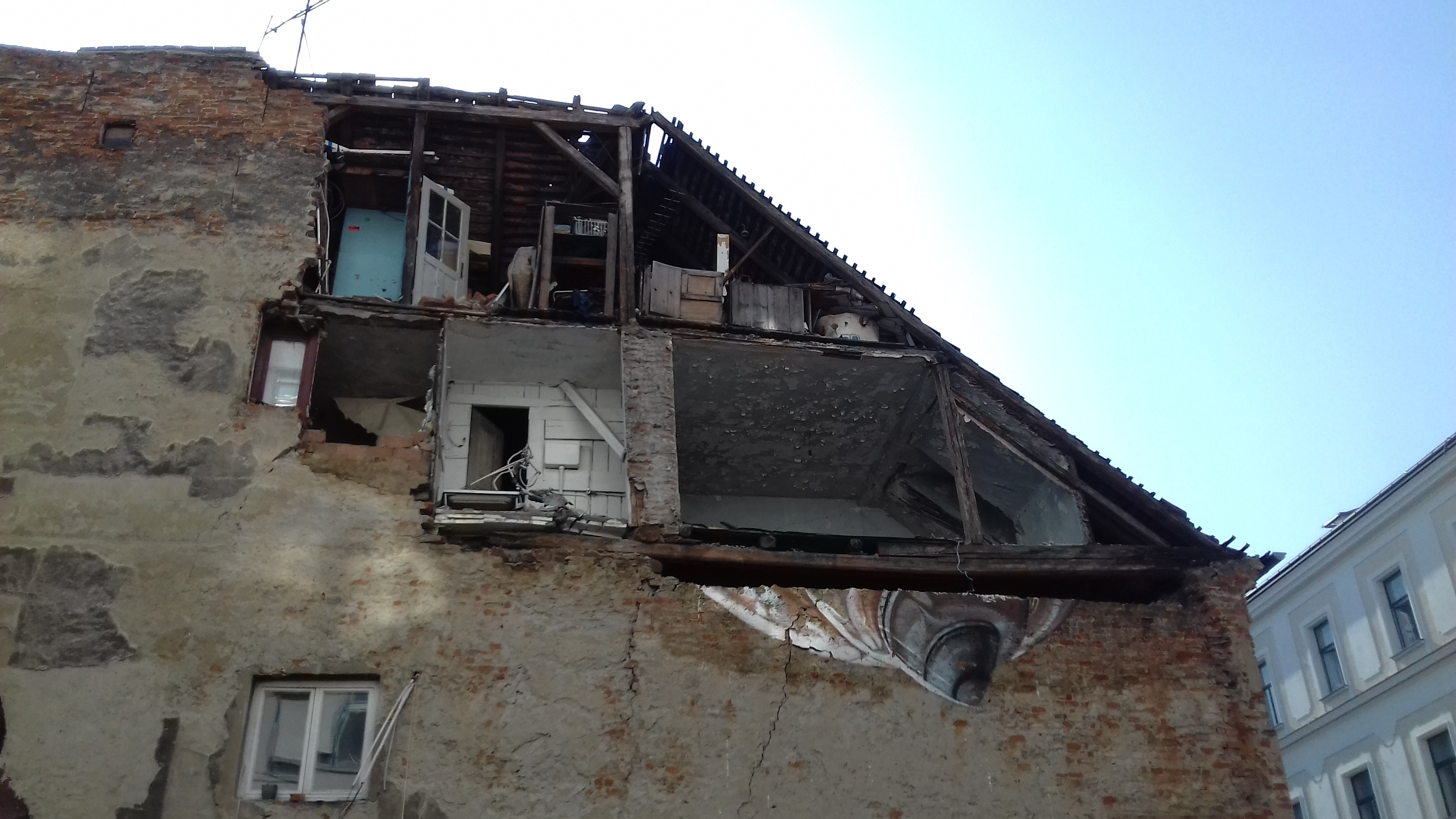
Damaged building in the city centre exposed to weather two years after the 2020 Zagreb earthquake

In late 2019, Zagreb was beset by protests by the Zagreb Calls You initiative, Siget, Green Action, and Right to the City calling for Bandić's resignation and arrest over his alleged large-scale frauds and corruption. The protests were motivated by the expectation that Bandić would pass a new general urban master plan accommodating the "Zagreb Manhattan" project which would have involved construction on a large amounts of green spaces and sports grounds, demolition of Zagreb Fair and Zagreb Hippodrome and, according to Bandić, construction of a 200-storey skyscraper in New Zagreb. "Zagreb Manhattan" and other changes in the plan proved controversial, attracting more than 30,000 complaints from the public, which were all rejected by the city authorities. The plan eventually failed after Bandić and HDZ could not come to an agreement about amendments to the plan. Defeat of HDZ's incumbent Kolinda Grabar-Kitarović in the 2019–20 Croatian presidential election, for which the backing of scandal-ridden Bandić was blamed, contributed to the falling out between Bandić and HDZ. In early 2020, protests against Bandić were suspended due to the coronavirus pandemic, which reached Zagreb on 25 February 2020. In March 2020, Bandić was criticised for making jokes about the lack of soap in Zagreb schools, telling students to wash their hands with charcoal ash as he had supposedly done in his youth.

In the early hours of 22 March 2020, the day the coronavirus quarantine started, Zagreb was struck by a M_{L} 5.5 earthquake. Despite its relatively low magnitude, the shallow focus of the earthquake and the poor state of Zagreb building stock contributed to widespread damage, even affecting some new buildings such as the Museum of Contemporary Art and Centar Cvjetni. Most of the hospitals, located in old buildings in the vulnerable northern part of the city, suffered damage and had to be evacuated. The damage was later estimated at €11.6 billion. In the early days of recovery, Bandić appointed himself head of civil protection in Zagreb and began holding daily press conferences on the subjects of earthquake and COVID-19. Bandić received criticism for his remark that the damages occurred because "the residents did not invest in their property", the announcement that property owners would be left to finance their own repairs, and assigning the blame for city centre damages to homeowners who did not take the city up on a façade renovation program, which in fact did not include seismic retrofitting or any other earthquake damage prevention work. A state inquiry found that none of the contracts aforementioned renovation projects had been closed, and that the emergency disaster fund had been spent on various associations, religious community projects and festivities. In April, protests against soon continued in the form of cacerolazo, while Bandić was accused by the Ministry of Construction of obstructing the recovery efforts, including refusing to house residents made homeless by the earthquake in empty and squatted social housing.

Bandić soon backtracked on his opposition to financing rebuilding and remained optimistic in his statements about recovery from the earthquake. However, reconstruction had not yet begun by the time of Bandić's death, and many people were still living in severely damaged buildings months later. In Donji grad, cultural heritage regulations created additional red tape for affected citizens. The authorities estimated that 20,000 people, or more than half of residents of Donji grad had moved out of their homes by the middle of April, and scaffolding protecting pedestrians from falling masonry began to be erected only in 2021. Bandić was criticised for spending millions on projects such as Snow Queen Trophy and decorative lighting while reducing allocation of funds for repairs of schools and other public buildings, and spending city money on uncoordinated duplication of residents' own renovation efforts. The city was also affected by a flash flood in July where citizens forced open an unstaffed dam to drain the city, and a stronger earthquake in nearby Petrinja area in December which, per Bandić's estimate, caused 20 times less damage to Zagreb than the March earthquake. The city did not release precise information on the extent of damages in Zagreb from the flood and the Petrinja earthquake, though Bandić pledged financial assistance to earthquake victims in Petrinja, where the City of Zagreb had earlier built school infrastructure while Petrinja's mayor was a member of BM365. One of the people involved in protests against Bandić was filmmaker Dario Juričan, who legally changed his name to Milan Bandić and ran in the 2019–20 presidential election as the self-proclaimed "evangelist of corruption", coming in fifth with 4.61% of the vote. In 2020, he created a documentary film, Kumek (lit.'The Little Godfather'), about Bandić's scandals.

== Personal life ==
After finishing college, Bandić stayed in Zagreb where he married his wife Vesna, with whom he had a daughter, Anamarija. In 1996, Bandić divorced his wife, citing "disagreements". A week later, his wife took advantage of a programme allowing highly discounted purchase of social apartments for people without a place to live, in order to purchase a small house in Donji grad for 35,760 kuna (€4,800), claiming she had lived there since 1975. Her request was approved by Bandić in his official capacity. Bandić remained living together with his wife in an apartment in Stara Peščenica, and in 2003, they remarried. In 2005, Bandić dismissed accusations of trying to profit from the social programme, saying: "If I had wanted to profit, I would have bought the [house] and sold it, and we would not be still paying it off today. The house was in derelict condition and had collapsed by 2014, when the Bandićs sold it to Adris grupa shareholder and billionaire Ante Vlahović for €150,000, who proceeded to build a controversial apartment building occupying its place and the adjoining lots.

In 2001, he illegally built a house in Slavagora near Samobor. Bandić and his family also owned and/or lived in several flats which he did not report in his asset declaration.

Bandić owned three horses, two of which were kept at the Zagreb Hippodrome. He also had two Golden Retrievers, Bil and Rudi, which he often walked during his work hours.

== Political career ==
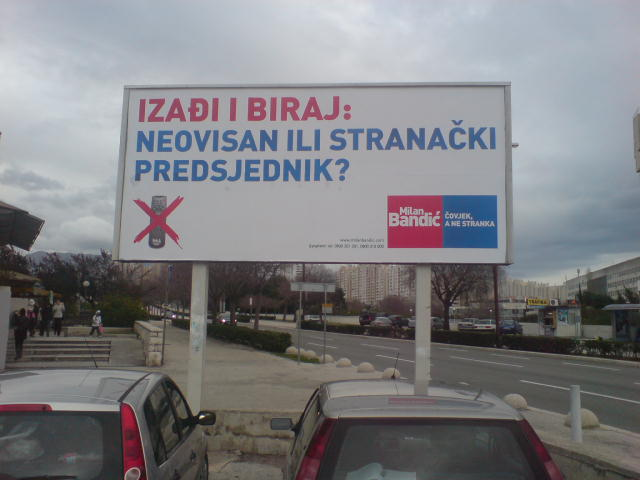
Bandić's billboard during his 2009–10 presidential campaign

Bandić was ultimately elected mayor six times, in 2000, 2001, 2005, 2009, 2013, and 2017. All the elections had a low turnout, never exceeding 50 percent. Bandić won with as little as 48,000 votes—in the 2000 election which had 689,000 eligible voters. His strongest show of support was 170,000 votes in the 2013 election against Ranko Ostojić, the candidate of Bandić's erstwhile party, SDP.

Bandić's politics were populist in nature: he split with the mayors of the 1990s by "fighting for the rights of little people", campaigning in the early 2000s in the poor neighbourhoods of Peščenica; an iconic poster portrays Bandić walking through mud in an unpaved street in Kozari Putevi. Bandić announced various populist measures, such as paying an extra salary to parents of three or more children, free public transport, and 100 kuna (€13) Easter bonuses for retirees, though not all of these measures were ever carried out whole or in part. Some measures were reversed in face of financial issues; for example, Bandić first advocated offering free rides to everyone under certain conditions in 2008, but then vyed for massive bus fare hikes in 2010, stating that it was "high time for a fair distribution of subsidies" after the public transport company ZET registered a large deficit.

In 2002, Bandić caused a political scandal by fleeing the scene of a car accident while under the influence of alcohol. Bandić unsuccessfully attempted to bribe and threatened the police officer who caught him. The police officer was fired for leaking a copy of the police report. This judgment was later overturned by a court and he was reinstated in the police force. The SDP leadership relieved Bandić of his mayoral duties and the Assembly voted in Vlasta Pavić as the new mayor, while Bandić was kept on as deputy mayor. Though she initially supported Bandić's projects despite opposition council members' protest that Bandić would use Pavić as a puppet mayor, Pavić soon expressed the same opinion herself, causing a falling out in the SDP ranks. Although SDP's president Ivica Račan sided with Pavić, Bandić would retain much of his power in the city government behind the scenes. In 2003, Bandić was reportedly attempting to force snap elections by attacking SDP's coalition partners and forming new alliances in the Zagreb Assembly. In 2004, he caused a controversy by publicly cursing out Pavić in the assembly, for which she demanded an apology. Eventually, she gave in and agreed not to run in the 2005 elections. SDP nominated Bandić as their mayoral candidate in the elections, which he won with 103,000 votes.

Returning to the mayoral position, Bandić consolidated his power, placing city companies in a holding company over which he had absolute control, appointing himself the sole board member (see § City finances). Controversies continued in 2005, when a Novi list journalist alleged that Bandić said "Work liberates, the Nazis weren't totally dumb". The following day, Bandić threatened to sue the journalist and the newspaper; he claimed he said "Marxists", not "Nazis". In January 2006, Bandić publicly threatened a journalist working for Večernji list because the journalist asked Bandić about an offer from a Czech company; Bandić then replied aggressively, cursing and threatening the journalist. Afterwards, he claimed he had simply spoken to the journalist in a loud voice. Following Račan's illness and death, Bandić unsuccessfully ran for the position at the 2007 leadership election, losing to Zoran Milanović. Bandić reportedly established himself as the leader of the opposition within the party against Milanović, who was alleged to have wanted Bandić out of the mayoral office. Both Milanović and Bandić later denied that there were major disagreements and a discord in the SDP. In 2008, a letter signed by 26 public figures of the Croatian Left, including academic Dražen Lalić, criticized the policies of the SDP, particularly Bandić's tenure as mayor and corruption allegations, and called out Milanović for "betraying social democracy". Milanović and the SDP leadership refuted the letter and expressed their support for Bandić.

Bandić ran for president in the 2009–10 elections. As he had done this without the authorisation of his party, who had nominated Ivo Josipović, he was expelled from SDP and lost his position as leader of the party's Zagreb branch. In the first round of the election, on 27 December 2009, Bandić received 14.83 percent of the vote, placing him in second place after Josipović with 32.70 percent. On 10 January he lost the second round with 39.74 percent of the vote. In Zagreb, Bandić lost both rounds of the election, receiving support only in a handful of city neighbourhoods. A year before his presidential campaign, it came to light that a record-breaking 251 criminal complaints had been filed against Bandić, but the State Attorney's Office had not acted on any of them.

In 2014, Bandić's mayoralty was temporarily interrupted when he was arrested due to the Agram affair. However, he did not resign, and returned to his position after his second release from jail. As of Bandić's death, Agram and other court cases were still ongoing. See § City finances.

After running as independent for several years following his expulsion from SDP, in 2015 Bandić founded a political party, Milan Bandić 365 – Labour and Solidarity Party, which was soon renamed Bandić Milan 365 – Labour and Solidarity Party. The party found little support from voters. Its best show was two seats won in the 2015 election, which were followed with a single seat in 2016. In the 2020 election, BM365 won around 9,000 votes and was left without representation in the parliament. Nevertheless, Bandić formed numerous alliances in the parliament, and was credited with ensuring the victory of HDZ, with whom he formed a coalition in the 2015 elections. Bandić once made a remark about the unsteady nature of these alliances, where he called the MPs in his alliance "play chips", a term which caught on in the news. He treated his allies, among them numerous minority representatives, with projects and donations funded by Zagreb city budget.

Bandić's city administration and Zagreb Holding would frequently contract companies owned by Bandić's associates, such as Bandić's godfather Milan Penava's company Tigra, which gained media attention due to the conflict of interest involved, but also very high costs charged to the city. The city administration would keep contracting construction companies which did work of poor quality that resulted in scandals, such as the Vrbani III companies, and Tehnika which had to redo twice its 2012 repaving of Flower Square. During the Agram affair case, USKOK played back secret recording of Bandić and city officials where Bandić apparently created a confrontation to impel the officials to hire one of his relatives; Bandić did not deny the veracity of the tape. Bandić's administration was fraught with accusations of nepotism, extending to the family of Bandić's deputy and acting successor Jelena Pavičić Vukičević. Pavičić Vukičević herself was appointed head of a city department in controversial circumstances soon after her removal from the Croatian parliament, on which Bandić commented that he would not let her "end up in the streets".

In early 2020, after HDZ's President Kolinda Grabar-Kitarović lost the election for her second term, there was a cooling in the relations between Bandić and the HDZ government, who killed his plan for a 200-storey skyscraper and criticised his handling of the 2020 calamities (see § 2020). In May 2020, Prime Minister Andrej Plenković publicly doubted Bandić's ability to pass the 2021 election threshold. In return, Bandić mocked the accusations that his notoriety brought down Grabar-Kitarović.

== Health and death ==
On 3 July 2003, Bandić suffered a serious stroke. After a session of the Zagreb Assembly, he requested medical assistance, stating that he had begun to feel ill during the session. He was hospitalised for a few weeks, then went to Krapinske Toplice to recover, and returned to his duties in September. In 2018, he had a surgery to insert a coronary stent. In June 2020 he was again hospitalised due to suspicion of another stroke, following an apparent dizzy spell in front of the cameras where he needed help to remain upright. In August 2020 he also underwent vocal cord surgery, but the surgery was unsuccessful in resolving his speech problems, which troubled him for the remainder of his life.

Bandić died, supposedly from a heart attack, at the Sveti Duh Clinical Hospital in Zagreb on 28 February 2021, aged 65. He was the longest serving mayor of Zagreb at the time of his death. He was buried at the Mirogoj Cemetery three days later, on 3 March. The funeral was attended by senior state officials, including Prime Minister Andrej Plenković, Parliament Speaker Gordan Jandroković, and ministers Tomo Medved and Gordan Grlić-Radman. Acting mayor Jelena Pavičić Vukičević, and Ljubo Jurčić, former Minister of Economy in Račan's second cabinet, addressed the funeral ceremony. Serbian Patriarch Porfirije was expected among the speakers, but was unable to attend the funeral due to self-isolation after being in contact with a COVID-positive person. His funeral was attended by more than a thousand people in total, thus violating quarantine rules that state that a maximum of 25 people can attend a funeral.

On 22 March, the State's Attorney Office began an inquiry into the circumstances of Bandić's death, as the eyewitness accounts did not match up. The SAO tossed the case in February 2022, citing no reasonable grounds for assuming Bandić was not given proper medical care in the moments after suffering the heart attack.

== Honours and awards ==
In 2007, Bandić joined the Brethren of the Croatian Dragon as the Dragon of Stone Gate.

In 2009, Bandić was made an honorary citizen of Srebrenica, Bosnia and Herzegovina.

In 2018, he received the Order of Friendship from Vladimir Putin. A street was named in his honour in the Russian city of Breslan.

In 2019, an attempt to award an honorary doctorate from the University of Zagreb to Bandić was called off after protests and motions of opposition by several Faculty councils of the university, which included Bandić's alma mater, the Faculty of Political Sciences.

In 2021, Bandić was posthumously awarded honorary citizenship by the city of Vrbovsko, Croatia.

== See also ==
- Zagreb crisis
- List of mayors of Zagreb

== Footnotes ==
Political offices
Preceded by Josip Kregar as Government Commissioner	Mayor of Zagreb; 2000–2002	Succeeded by Vlasta Pavić
Preceded by Vlasta Pavić	Mayor of Zagreb; 2005–2021	Succeeded by Jelena Pavičić Vukičević as Acting Mayor
Party political offices
Preceded by Vesna Vešligaj	President of the Zagreb Committee of the Social Democratic Party of Croatia; 1997–2009	Succeeded by Ivo Jelušić as Acting President
New political party	President of Bandić Milan 365 – Labour and Solidarity Party; 2015–2021	Succeeded by Jelena Pavičić Vukičević as Acting President
