= 2005 Zagreb local elections =

Local elections in Croatia

- 15 May 2005

All 51 seats to the Zagreb Assembly 26 seats needed for a majority
- Turnout: 35.94% ▼3.85 pp
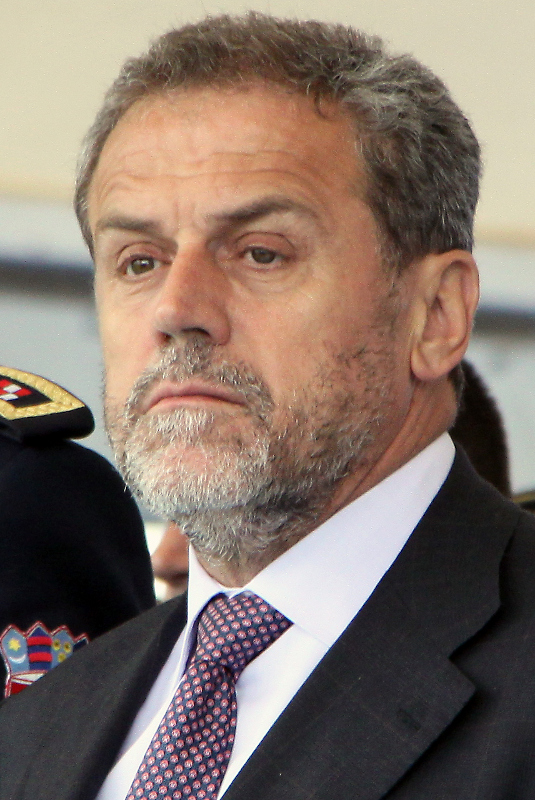

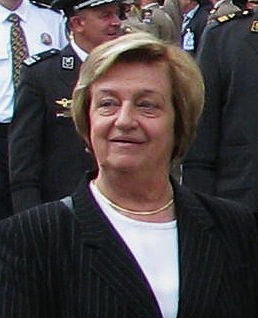
	First party	Second party
Candidate	Milan Bandić	Marina Matulović Dropulić
Party	SDP–HSS–HSU	HDZ–DC–HSLS–HD
Seats won	25 / 51	9 / 51
Seat change	▲5	▼5
Popular vote	102,857	38,672
Percentage	40.95%	15.44%
Swing	▲13.88 pp	▼4.51 pp
Mayor before election
Vlasta Pavić
Social Democratic Party (Croatia)
Elected mayor
Milan Bandić
Social Democratic Party (Croatia)

Elections were held on 15 May 2005 in Zagreb, the capital of Croatia. Following the last local elections in 2001, Milan Bandić of the Social Democratic Party of Croatia (SDP) had been re-elected as the mayor of Zagreb. In 2002, an incident made him resign in favor of Deputy Mayor Vlasta Pavić, also from the SDP. Pavić remained formally in control of the city until 2005. In the 2005 elections, she was moved down the list of candidates to the 16th place, while the list holder and SDP's candidate for mayor was Bandić.

The elections mainly pitted two former mayors, Bandić of the SDP and Marina Matulović Dropulić of the Croatian Democratic Union (HDZ). The SDP formed a coalition with the Croatian Peasant Party (HSS) and the Croatian Party of Pensioners (HSU), while the HDZ was in a coalition with the Democratic Centre (DC), the Croatian Social Liberal Party (HSLS), and the Croatian Demochristians (HD). The SDP gained 25 seats in the Zagreb Assembly, receiving 40.95% of the vote, with Milan Bandić winning his third term as the Zagreb mayor.

== Coalitions ==
The Social Democratic Party of Croatia (SDP) ran with the Croatian Peasant Party (HSS) and the Croatian Party of Pensioners (HSU). Former Mayor Milan Bandić, who had to resign from his earlier term due to a driving under the influence scandal in 2002, was the list holder and the coalition's candidate for mayor. Vesna Pusić, the head of the Croatian People's Party (HNS), announced that the HNS won't be a member of the coalition due to the candidacy of Bandić. Pusić added that Milan Bandić is "at the top of each affair causing damage" to the city.

The SDP and the HNS were in coalition in the previous Assembly. Due to this breakup, the HNS ran together with the Liberal Party (LS), with Pusić as the list holder. The Croatian Democratic Union (HDZ) entered a coalition with the Democratic Centre (DC), the Croatian Demochristians (HD), and the Croatian Social Liberal Party (HSLS).

== Results ==
The turnout at the election was 35%. The SDP–HSS–HSU coalition, led by incumbent Mayor Milan Bandić, won 41% of the vote and 25 out of 51 seats in the Zagreb Assembly. Bandić was elected mayor by the new Assembly and started his third term as the mayor of Zagreb. The HDZ–DC–HSLS–HD coalition, with former Mayor Marina Matulović Dropulić as the list holder, won 9 seats, while the HSP list, led by Miroslav Rožić, finished third with 6 seats. The HNS–LS coalition won 8% of the vote and 4 seats, down from 12 in the 2001 elections. The LS was later incorporated into the HSLS.

Milan Bandić was elected mayor by the Assembly on 14 June 2005.

=== Assembly election ===
Summary of the 2005 Zagreb local elections
Parties and coalitions	List holder	Popular vote			Seats	
Parties and coalitions	List holder	Votes	%	±pp	Total	+/−
Social Democratic Party of Croatia (SDP); Croatian Peasant Party (HSS); Croatian Party of Pensioners (HSU)	Milan Bandić	102,857	40.95%	+13.88	25	+5
Croatian Democratic Union (HDZ); Democratic Centre (DC); Croatian Social Liberal Party (HSLS); Croatian Demochristians (HD)	Marina Matulović Dropulić	38,672	15.40%	–4.51	9	–5
Croatian Party of Rights (HSP)	Miroslav Rožić	28,534	11.36%	* (Note: The HSP ran together with the HDZ in the previous election.)	6	*
Croatian People's Party (HNS); Liberal Party (LS)	Vesna Pusić	20,368	8.11%	–9.43	4	–8
Independent list of Tatjana Holjevac	Tatjana Holjevac	17,497	6.97%	New	4	New
Independent list of Boris Mikšić	Boris Mikšić	14,807	5.90%	New	3	New
Other lists		28,415	11.31%		0	
Total:		251,150			51	
Invalid votes:		4,019	1.57%			
Turnout:		255,321	35.94%	–3.85		
Registered voters:		710,344				
Source: City Election Committee
Notes:

Popular vote
SDP–HSS–HSU	40.95%
HDZ–DC–HSLS–HD	15.44%
HSP	11.36%
HNS–LS	8.11%
NL Tatjana Holjevac	6.97%
NL Boris Mikšić	5.90%
Other	11.31%

Seat totals
SDP–HSS–HSU	49.02%
HDZ–DC–HSLS–HD	17.65%
HSP	11.76%
HNS–LS	7.84%
NL Tatjana Holjevac	7.84%
NL Boris Mikšić	5.88%

=== Councils of districts ===
Distribution of seats per district
District	SDP–HSS– HSU	HDZ–DC– HSLS–HD	HSP	HNS	Others
Donji Grad	6	3	2	3	1
Gornji Grad – Medveščak	6	3	2	2	2
Trnje	7	3	2	1	2
Maksimir	7	4	2	1	1
Peščenica – Žitnjak	11	4	2	1	1
Novi Zagreb – istok	10	4	2	2	1
Novi Zagreb – zapad	7	4	2	1	1
Trešnjevka – sjever	9	4	4	2	
Trešnjevka – jug	9	4	3	2	1
Črnomerec	7	4	3	1	
Gornja Dubrava	9	5	3	1	1
Donja Dubrava	8	4	2	1	
Stenjevec	7	3	3	1	1
Podsused – Vrapče	7	3	2	1	2
Podsljeme	4	2	2	1	2
Sesvete	10	4	3	1	1
Brezovica	3	3	1		4
Totals	127	61	40	22	21

== See also ==
- List of mayors of Zagreb
