= Gračani =

Gračani may refer to:

- Gračani, North Macedonia, a former village near Ǵorče Petrov, Skopje
- Gračani, Zagreb, a neighbourhood in the district of Podsljeme in Zagreb, Croatia
- Gračani, Albania, a village near Korçë

== See also ==
- Gračan
