= Zagreb Cable Car =

Cable car in Zagreb, Croatia

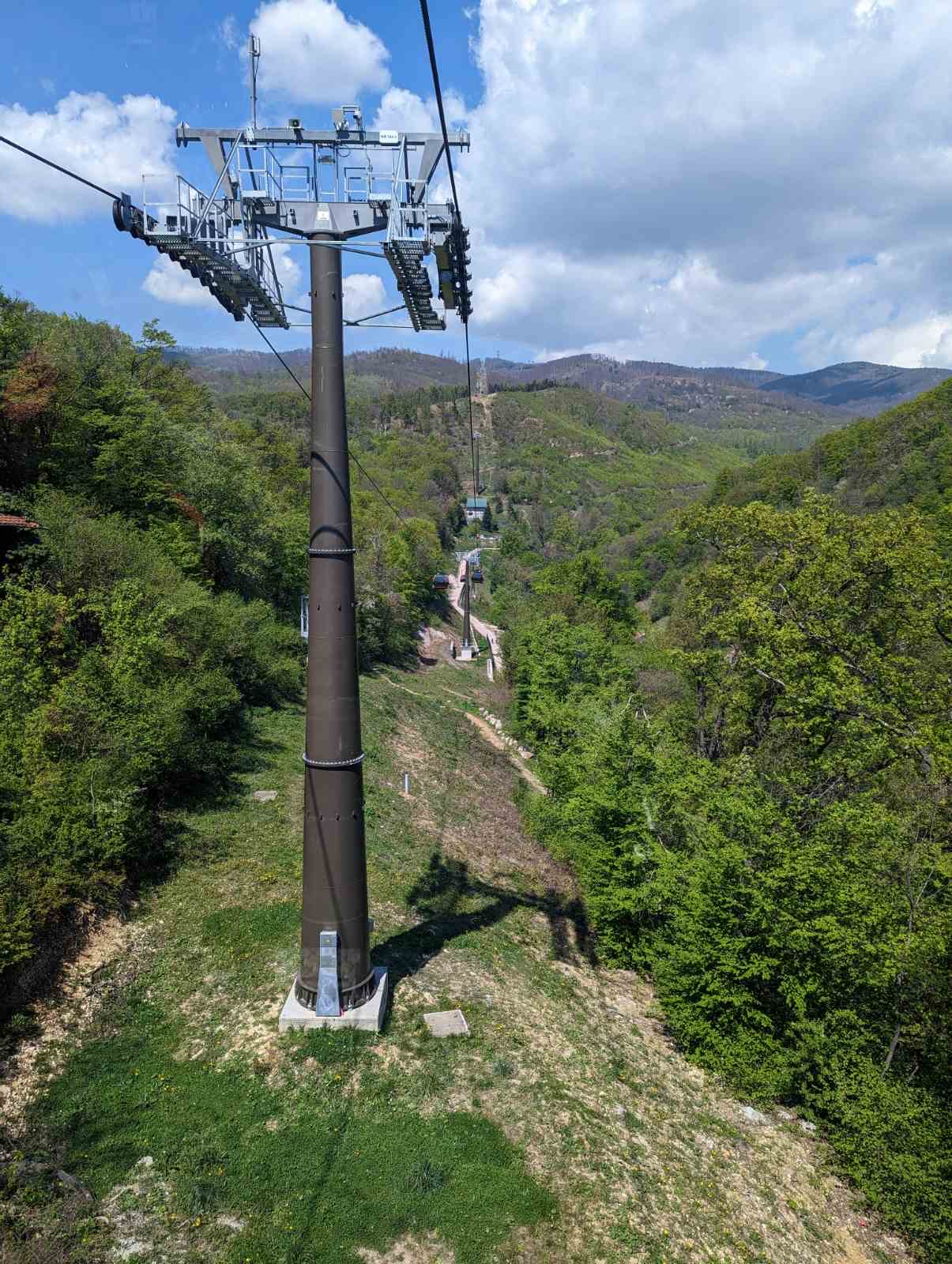
- Cable car with the view of Sljeme

Overview
- Other name: Cable Car Sljeme
- Status: Open
- Locale: Zagreb, Croatia
- Coordinates: 45°51′40″N 15°58′56″E
- Termini: Podsljeme; Medvednica
- Stations: 3
- Website: www.zet.hr/home/cable-car/7770

Service
- Type: Gondola lift
- Operator: ZET
- Rolling stock: Doppelmayr

History
- Opened: 2022; 4 years ago

Technical
- Line length: 5,017 m (16,460 ft)
- Character: Elevated
- Operating speed: 20 km/h (12 mph)

The Zagreb Cable Car, also known as Cable Car Sljeme, is a gondola lift in Zagreb, Croatia. Opened in February 2022, it runs from the Podsljeme district to Sljeme, the highest peak of the Medvednica mountain.

== History ==
In 1957, after years of debate between various social organizations, the Commission for Excursion Tourism was established, which proposed the need to build a modern gondola lift to Sljeme, the top of Medvednica mountain overlooking Zagreb. The funding came from multiple sources, including the Tourist Association of Zagreb, republic funds for the improvement of vacations, lottery winnings, businesses and citizens. Zagreb Electric Tram was chosen as the investor. The preparations for the construction of the first gondola lift in Zagreb started in 1960, when a stretch of the forest was cut for the 13 gondola pylons that would support the cables. Construction started in 1962, and since there was no regulation on cable cars in Yugoslavia at the time, the gondola lift was constructed according to Austrian regulations. The construction work on the cable car was carried out by the company Udarnik from Zagreb, while the steel structure was assembled by Metalna from Maribor. Several parts of the lift were imported.

The gondola lift was opened in July 1963 as the longest in Europe. It had 88 cabins painted blue, red and yellow, each for 4 people, able to accommodate 352 people at once. It was 4,017 metres (13,179 feet) long, taking 23 minutes to get to the top of Medvednica, with a height difference of 670 m (2,200 ft). The lift was powered by two 92 kW electric motors, and in case of a power shortage, a 125 hp diesel motor was built-in. While it was estimated that 675,000 people would use the gondola lift annually, in 1967, it only transported 255,000 passengers that year. The underwhelming ridership was attributed to the lack of amenities at the top of Medvednica. After one of the main motors broke in June 2007, after 44 years in use, ZET soon realized that the repairs would be too expensive, and the gondola lift was closed.

== Current gondola lift ==
=== Construction ===
The new gondola lift had been promised multiple times in the years following the closure, but was never realized. Finally, on 16 January 2019, then mayor Milan Bandić and director of GIP Pionir, the contractor, Ranko Predović signed a contract for the construction of the new gondola lift. The same contractor was commissioned to clear a stretch of the forest for the lift a few years before. The cabins were supplied by Doppelmayr. The gondola lift was projected to cost €39.82 million and be completed by November 2020, and construction officially began on 25 January. In December 2019, the city borrowed €71.27 million for the project. In October 2020, the cost rose up to €68.26 million, and the opening was postponed. As a result, the opposition in the Zagreb Assembly sued the city, while the city sued the developer which claimed they warned the city about possible cost hikes.

The gondola lift was officially opened on 23 February 2022 by mayor Tomislav Tomašević, who was against it while in opposition, for a total cost of €71.27 million, including paperwork and connecting to the electricity network. The project was completed 15 months late and €39.82 million overbudget due to multiple changes to the project paperwork and incomplete documents, among other things. Some critics argue that the gondola lift was unnecessarily large and expensive, and that it doesn’t blend in with the surrounding architecture.

=== Operation ===
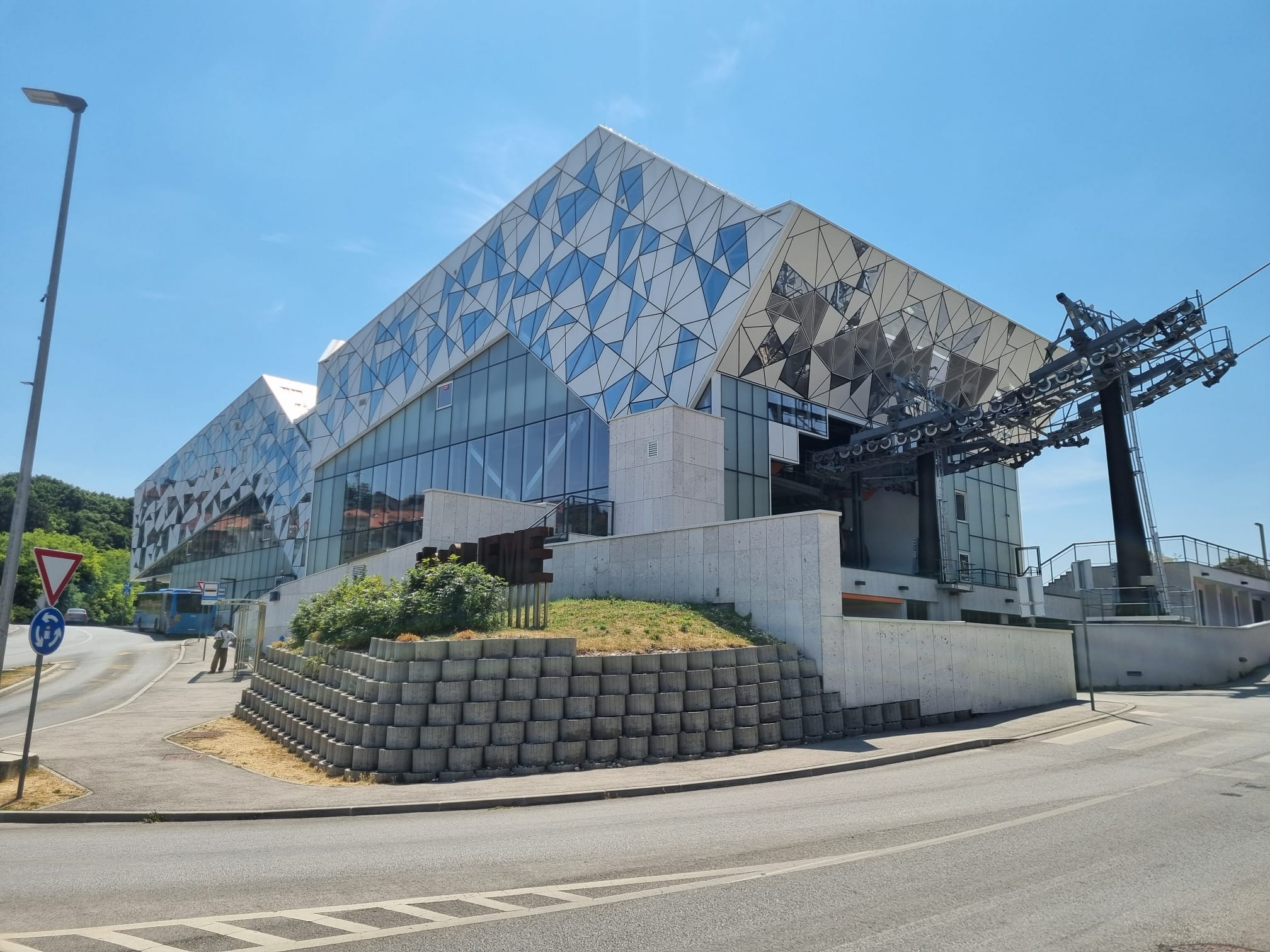
Base station at Podsljeme

The current gondola lift is 5,017 m (16,460 ft) long and can transport up to 1,500 people per hour, with a speed of 20 km/h (12 mph). The journey time is 16 to 22 minutes, depending on the speed. It is free to ride for everyone living in Zagreb.

The base station is located in Podsljeme at an altitude of 267 m (876 ft) above sea level. It features outdoor parking and a garage with over 200 parking spaces. It is located next to the tram line 15 and several bus lines, making it accessible by public transit. At 308 m (1,010 ft) is a corner station which only exists to change the direction of travel of the gondolas. There is an intermediate station at Brestovac at an altitude of 877 m (2,877 ft), and the summit station is located at the summit of Medvednica at an altitude of 1,030 m (3,380 ft).

The lift provides access to the ski slopes of Medvednica, and the gondolas are fitted with ski holders, as well as being able to accommodate bicycles. One gondola has the load capacity of 800 kg (1,800 lb), and can accommodate 10 people.

== Gallery ==
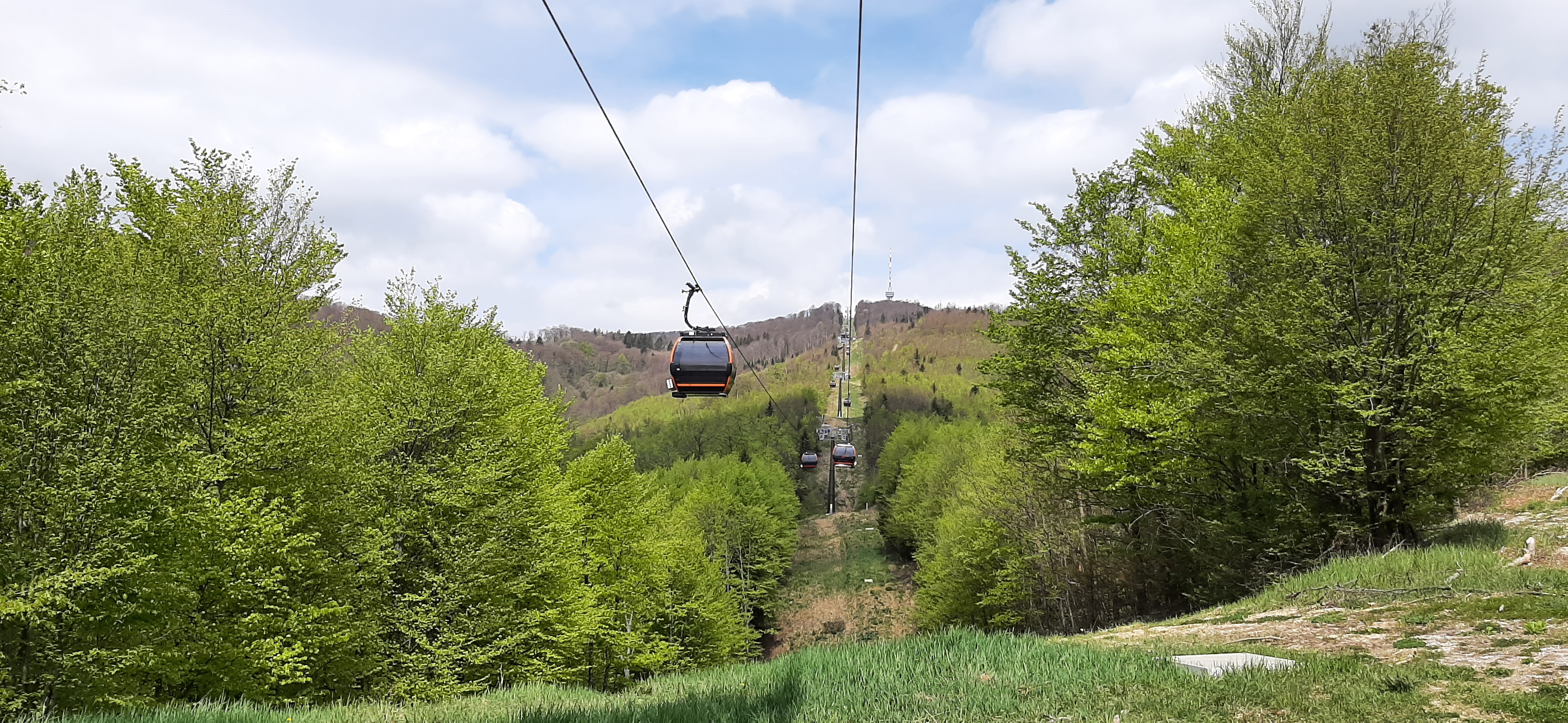
View of Medvednica

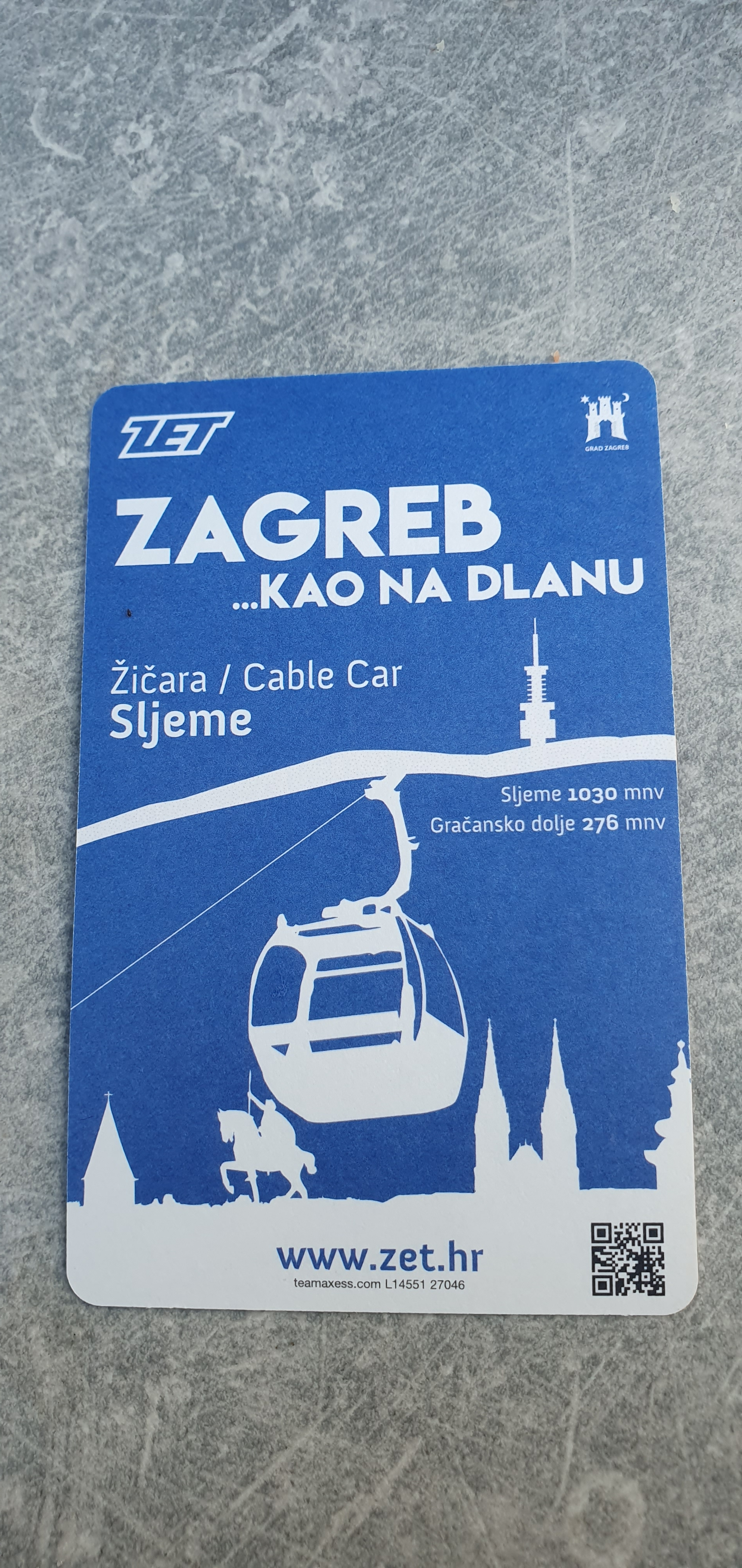
Ticket pass

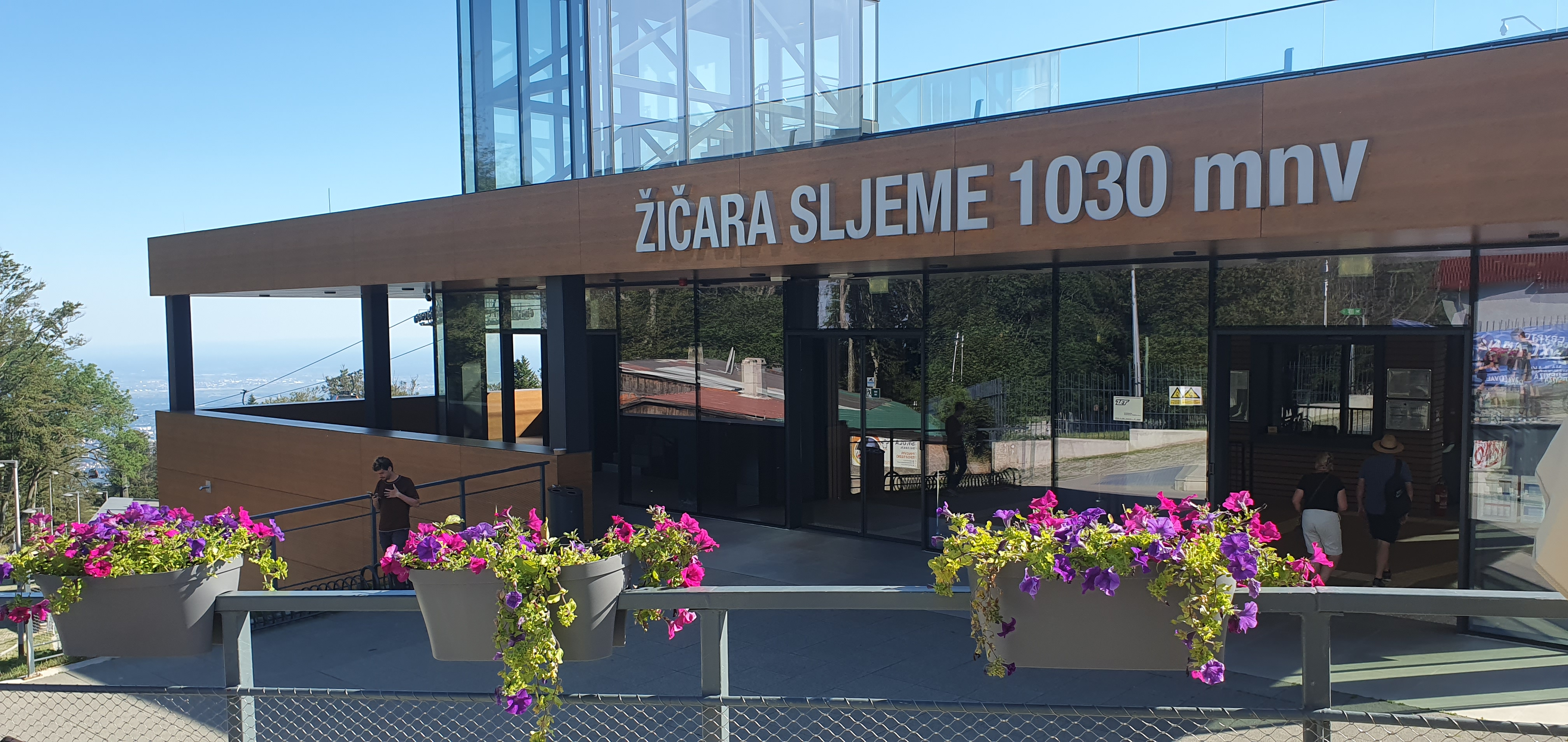
Final station at the top, showing 1030 m.a.s.l.

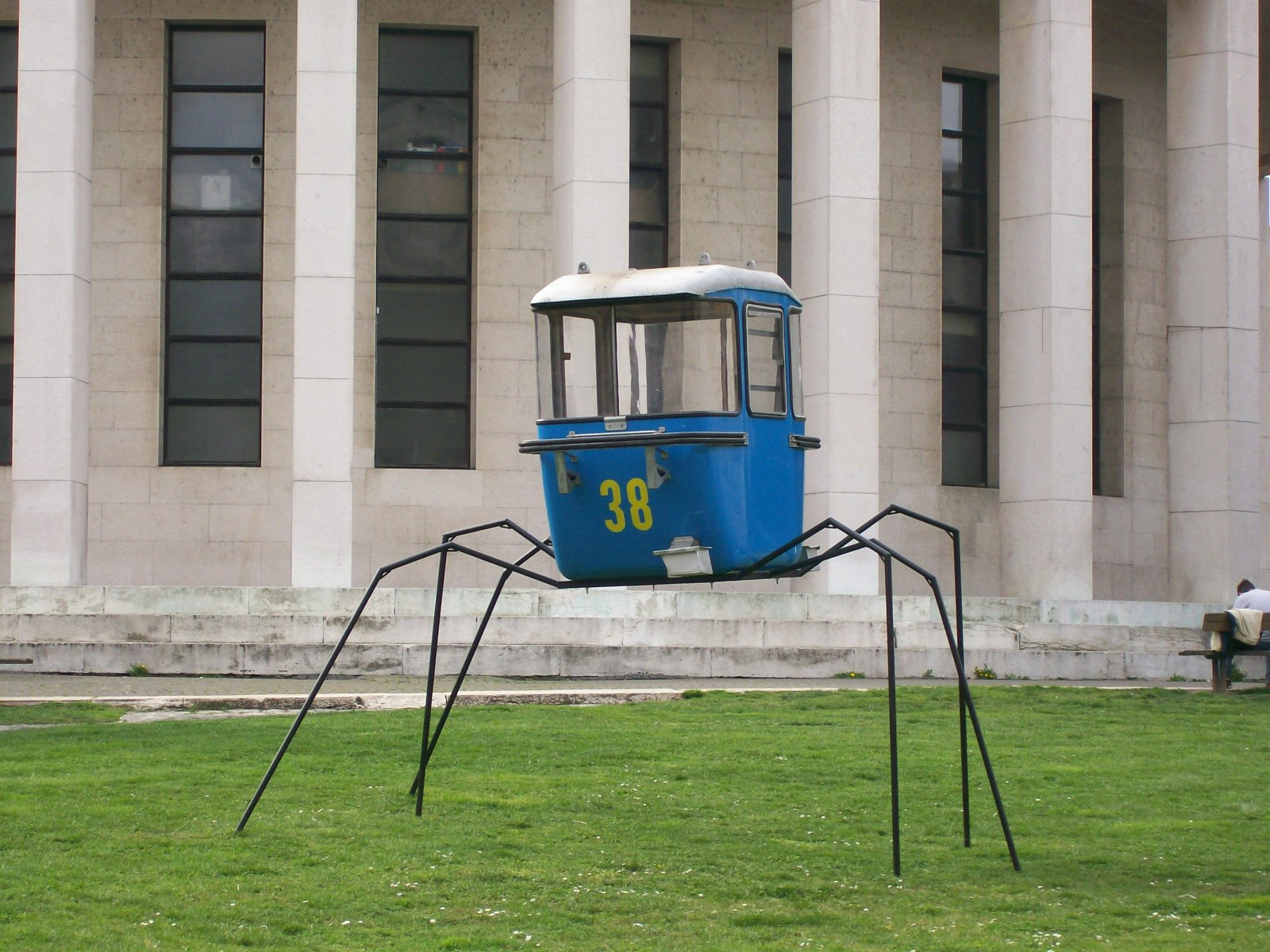
Old cable car model from the 60s, shown as part of an exhibition in front of the Meštrović Pavilion
