= Vlasta Pavić =

Croatian lawyer and politician

Mayor of Zagreb
- In office 1 March 2002 – 14 June 2005
- Deputy: Stipe Tojčić (for economy); Milan Bandić (for social services)
- Preceded by: Milan Bandić
- Succeeded by: Milan Bandić

Personal details
- Born: 24 May 1957 (age 69) Zagreb, PR Croatia, FPR Yugoslavia
- Party: Social Democratic Party
- Education: University of Zagreb
- Occupation: Politician
- Profession: Lawyer

Vlasta Pavić (born 24 May 1957) is a Croatian lawyer and politician who served as Mayor of Zagreb from 2002 to 2005. She is the second woman to hold that office, and a member of the centre-left Social Democratic Party (SDP).

She graduated at the Zagreb Faculty of Law in 1980.

== Term as mayor ==
Pavić was elected mayor of Zagreb on 1 March 2002 after Milan Bandić (also a member of the SDP) was forced to resign due to a public scandal. She was elected with the support of city assembly members of the ruling coalition of the time the SDP and the HNS. On taking office she indicated she planned to continue the projects begun by Bandić. Bandić was elected as one of her two deputies shortly afterwards. However Bandić reportedly intended for Pavić to serve as his puppet mayor, which she refused. The feud between Pavić and Bandić lasted throughout her career as a Zagreb mayor. She publicly accused him of treating Zagreb as his personal property.

In May 2003, Nacional reported that in his campaign to undermine Pavić, Bandić was allied with the right-wing opposition.

In March 2004 she demanded a public apology from Bandić for having allegedly insulted her mother in a "vulgar and very primitive" way. She stated that she had, in the interests of the city and the coalition, pushed much under the carpet but no longer considered it right to keep quiet. The incident occurred when an opposition member asked a question about a controversial purchase of land with city money. Pavić had answered that as it was a matter before the courts she could not go into details. This neutral answer did not satisfy Bandić and he started cursing her.

The two struck a deal that she would not run in the next mayoral elections. Regular local elections were held on 15 May 2005. Vlasta Pavić's mayoral term ended on 14 June 2005.

== Honours and awards ==
- Albania: Received a copy of the key of the city of Tirana on the occasion of her state visit to Albania.

== Notes ==
Preceded by Milan Bandić (1st term)	Mayor of Zagreb; 2002–2005	Succeeded by Milan Bandić (2nd term)
