= Markuševec =

Neighbourhood of Zagreb, Croatia

Coordinates: 45.862°N 15.984°E

- Interactive map of Markuševec

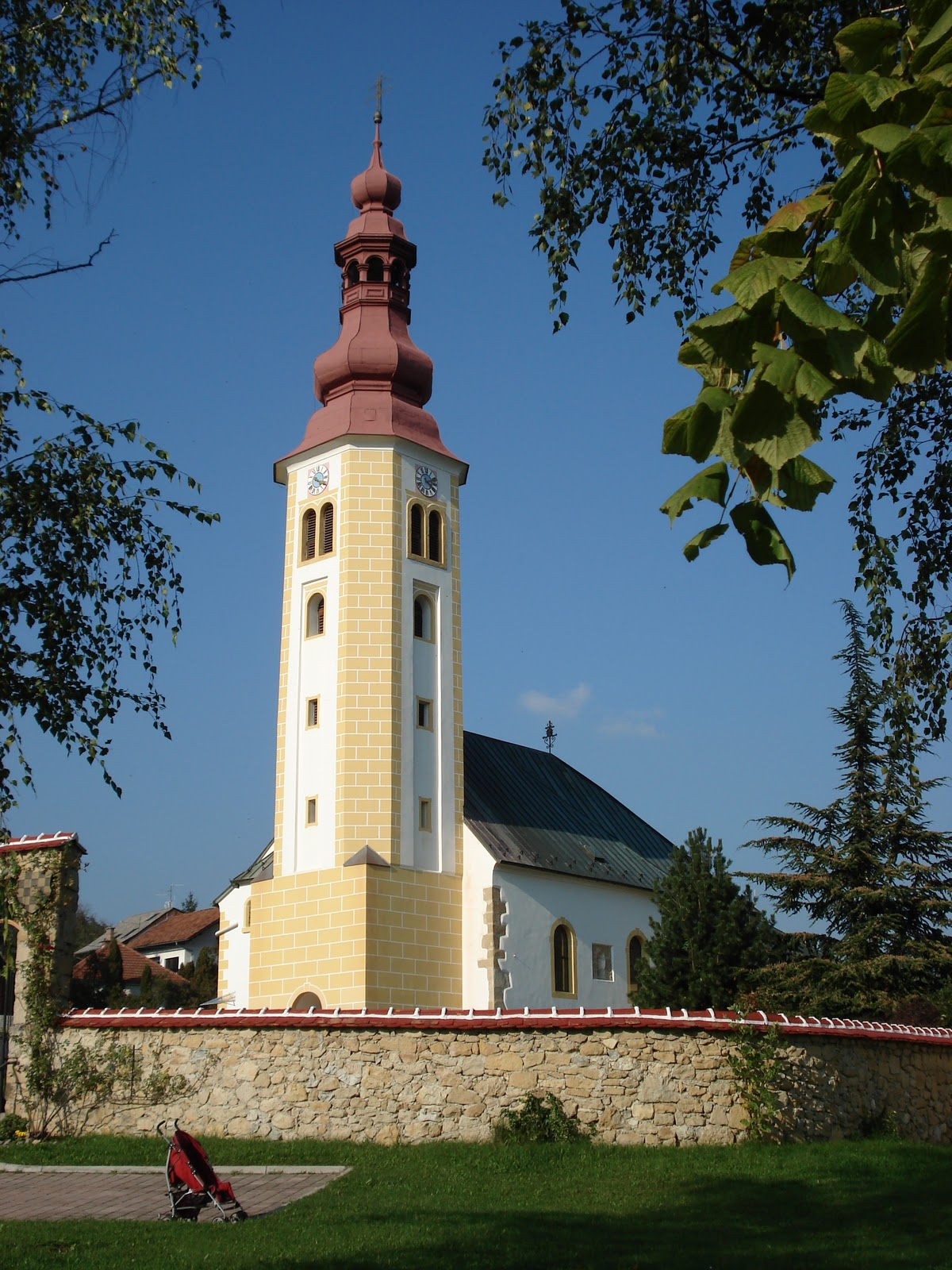
Kompleks sakralnih građevina u Markuševcu

Markuševec is a neighbourhood in the northeast of Zagreb, Croatia, within the Podsljeme district. The area of the local city council of Markuševec has a population of 6,236 (census 2021).

The old village of Markuševec was known for centuries, and used to be called Sv. Šimun (St. Simon), after the local Catholic Church, one of the oldest in the Zagreb Diocese, dated to 1276, with the current altar built in 1476. The village was renamed to Markuševec in the 16th century after a magnate called Markuscz raised a significant population of servants and serfs that received the moniker 'Markusczevi'.

The area was integrated into the city of Zagreb in 1949. Between 1955 and 1967, and then between 1974 and the 1990s, Markuševec was part of the administrative area of Maksimir. The current administrative layout dates to 2009.
