= Faculty of Political Science, University of Zagreb =

Higher learning institution in Croatia

Faculty of Political Science of the University of Zagreb
- Fakultet političkih znanosti Sveučilišta u Zagrebu
- Type: Public
- Established: 23 February 1962; 64 years ago
- Affiliations: University of Zagreb
- Rector: Stjepan Lakušić
- Dean: Dario Nikić Čakar
- Students: 1422 (2023/2024)
- Location: Lepušićeva 6, Zagreb, Croatia
- Website: fpzg.unizg.hr

The Faculty of Political Science in Zagreb (Croatian: Fakultet političkih znanosti Sveučilišta u Zagrebu, abbreviated FPZG) is one of the constituent institutions of the University of Zagreb.

== History ==
The Faculty was founded by the Parliament of the People's Republic of Croatia on 23 February 1962 as part of the University of Zagreb. Classes began in November of that year. In 1971 the Faculty launched a journalism school that later evolved into a separate study program.

Since 2005, with the introduction of the comprehensive university reform based on Bologna Declaration, political science and journalism programs offer bachelor and master programs. Postgraduate specialist programs and a three-year doctoral program in political science are also available.

During the 2020 Zagreb earthquake the building of the faculty had been severely damaged and had to subsequently undergo a full reconstruction that was successfully completed in 2025.

== Organization ==
Research and teaching at the Faculty is organized into nine academic departments:

- Department of Croatian Politics
- Department of Media and Communication
- Department of Comparative Politics
- Department of Public Policy, Management and Development
- Department of International Relations and Security Studies
- Department of Political and Social Theory
- Department of Foreign Languages, Pedagogical and Physical Education
- Department of Strategic Communication
- Department of Journalism and Media Production
