= Green Action =

Environmental organization

Green Action (Croatian: Zelena akcija) is an environmental organisation based in Zagreb, Croatia and the national member of Friends of the Earth. Based with a full-time activist group with thirteen members back by a larger number of volunteers, the organisation works on topics related to biodiversity, energy, climate change, freshwater, genetically modified organisms, transport, urbanism and waste. Green Action was founded in 1990.

Green Action is part of the 30 national organisations that Friends of the Earth Europe represents and unites at the European level.

== See also ==
- Tomislav Tomašević
