= Jarun Bridge =

Planned bridge in Croatia

- Coordinates: 45°46′54″N 15°54′05″E
- Crosses: Sava River
- Locale: southwest Zagreb, Croatia
- Official name: Jarunski most

Characteristics
- Total length: 625 m (2,051 ft)
- Width: 42 m (138 ft)
- Longest span: 150 m (492 ft)

History
- Construction cost: €40 million (est.)

Location
- Interactive map of Jarun Bridge

Jarun Bridge (Croatian: Jarunski most) is a planned bridge that will cross the Sava River in Zagreb, the capital of Croatia. The bridge will be located in the western part of the city, Trešnjevka near Lake Jarun.

== History ==
The city of Zagreb organized a tender for the design of the Jarun Bridge in 2006, and accepted the project in 2007. Building permits were issued in 2011, but the construction, originally estimated to cost around €40 million, did not start due to a lack of funds.

As of 2013, the city was considering a pedestrian-and-cycle design as a cheaper alternative. In early 2020, the process of acquiring the building permits was reinitiated.
