= Podsljeme =

District of Zagreb, Croatia

Coordinates: 45°51′41.31″N 15°58′58.51″E

- District of Zagreb
- Podsljeme as a part of Zagreb
- Country: Croatia
- County/City: Zagreb

Government
  - Council President: Krešimir Kompesak (Marija Selak Raspudić list)
  - District Council: Composition (11): M!-SDP (4); Marija Selak Raspudić list (3); HDZ-DP-HSU-HSS (2); Local Candidate list (2)

Area
  - Total: 59.445 km^{2} (22.952 sq mi)

Population (2021)
  - Total: 18,974
  - Density: 319.19/km^{2} (826.69/sq mi)

Map

Podsljeme (pronounced [pǒtsʎeme]) is a city district situated in the foothills of Zagreb's mountain, Medvednica. Its name stands for "under Sljeme" (Sljeme is the peak of the Medvednica mountain). It has the status of četvrt (quarter, district, borough) and as such has an elected council. It is located about 5km north of central Zagreb.

In 2021, Podsljeme had 18,974 residents, making it the second least populous city district in Zagreb. It is primarily a residential area known for its suburban character and primarily inhabited by middle and upper-middle-class residents.

The lower station of the Zagreb cable car leading to Sljeme is located in this district.

Podsljeme is an affluent area of Zagreb, known for its high property values. The area features upscale homes set among dense deciduous forests, making it a popular choice for the city's business leaders, politicians, and celebrities.

== List of neighborhoods in Podsljeme ==
The district is subdivided into the following local councils (mjesni odbori):

- Gračani
- Šestine
- Markuševec
- Mlinovi
- Vidovec

Smaller neighbourhoods include:

- Prekrižje
- Bliznec
- Dolje
