= Ministry of Construction, Spatial Planning and State Property =

Ministry of Croatian government

Ministry of Construction, Spatial Planning and State Property Ministarstvo graditeljstva, prostornog uređenja i državne imovine

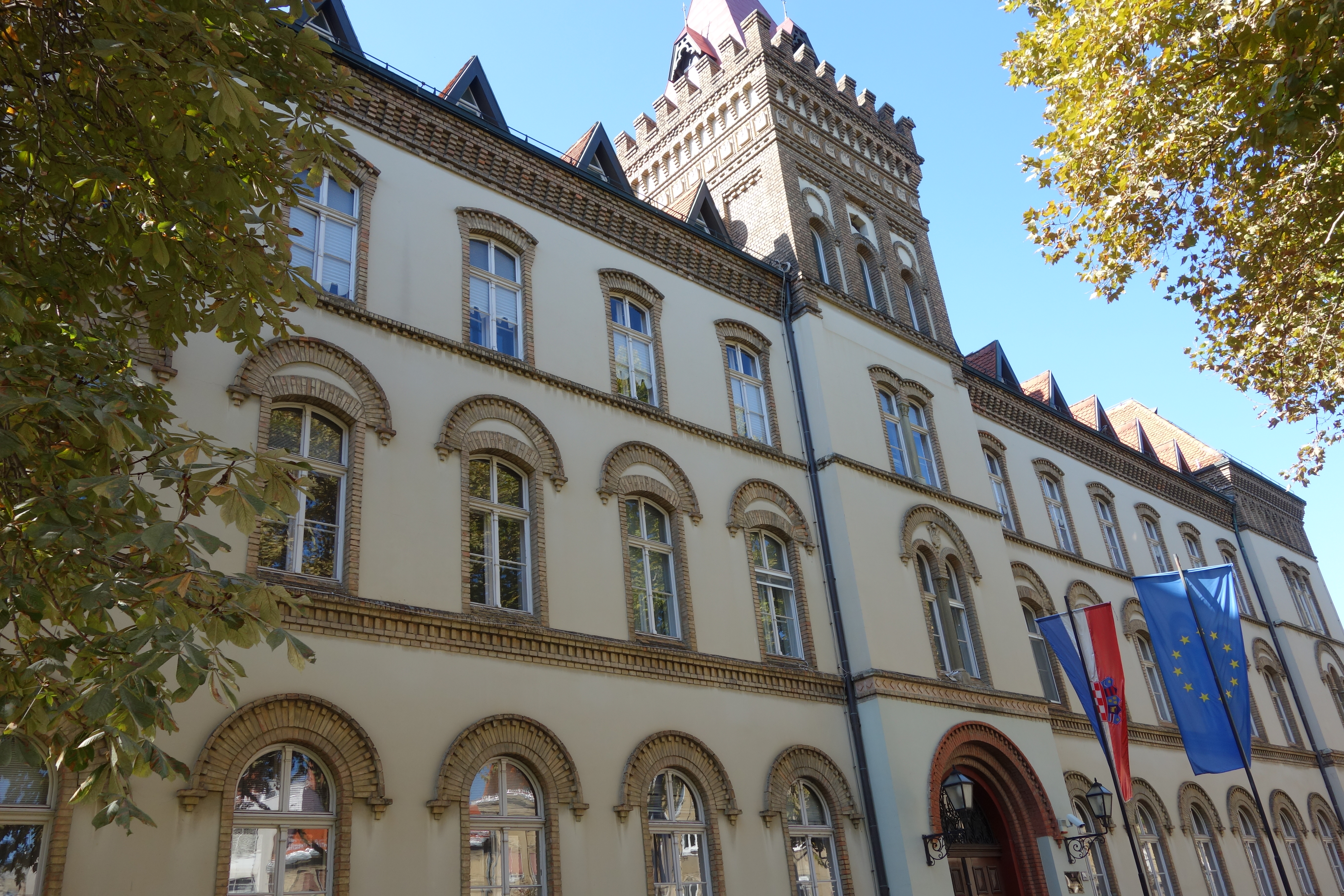
- Located in the former Rudolf barracks

Ministry overview
- Formed: 31 May 1990; 36 years ago
- Type: Ministry in the Government of Croatia
- Jurisdiction: Croatia
- Headquarters: Trg Republike Austrije 14, Zagreb, Croatia
- Employees: 24,942 (2025)
- Budget: €1.496 billion (2025)
- Website: mgipu.gov.hr

Minister
- Currently: Branko Bačić since 17 January 2023

The Ministry of Construction, Spatial Planning and State Property of the Republic of Croatia (Croatian: Ministarstvo graditeljstva, prostornog uređenja i državne imovine) is the ministry in the Government of Croatia which is in charge of construction.

The total amount of budget funds allocated to the combined Ministry Construction and the Ministry of the Environment was 699 million HRK as of 2014 (ca. 90 million EUR).

The government agencies in the jurisdiction of the Ministry have included:

- Environmental Protection Agency (Croatian: Agencija za zaštitu okoliša)
- Agency for Real Estate Brokerage (Agencija za pravni promet i posredovanje nekretninama)
- State Geodetic Administration (Državna geodetska uprava)
- Croatian Geodetic Institute (Hrvatski geodetski institut)

== List of ministers ==
=== Ministers of Construction and Physical Planning (1990–2020) ===
Minister	Party	Term start	Term end	Days in office
Milan Hrnjak ^{[nb 1]}	HDZ	31 May 1990	4 March 1991	277
Ivan Cifrić ^{[nb 2]}	Ind.	2 August 1991	12 August 1992	376
Zdenko Karakaš ^{[nb 3]}	HDZ	12 August 1992	3 April 1993	234
Zlatko Tomčić ^{[nb 3]}	HSS	3 April 1993	31 December 1994	637
Marina Matulović-Dropulić ^{[nb 4]}	HDZ	27 January 1995	16 December 1996	689
Marko Širac ^{[nb 4]}	HDZ	16 December 1996	27 January 2000	1,137
Radimir Čačić ^{[nb 5]}	HNS-LD	27 January 2000	23 December 2003	1,426
Marina Matulović-Dropulić ^{[nb 6]} (2nd term)	HDZ	23 December 2003	29 December 2010	2,563
Branko Bačić ^{[nb 6]}	HDZ	29 December 2010	23 December 2011	359
Ivan Vrdoljak	HNS-LD	23 December 2011	16 November 2012	329
Anka Mrak-Taritaš	HNS-LD	16 November 2012	22 January 2016	1,162
Lovro Kuščević	HDZ	22 January 2016	9 June 2017	504
Predrag Štromar	HNS-LD	9 June 2017	23 July 2020	1,140

=== Ministers of Construction, Spatial Planning and State Property (2020–present) ===
Minister	Party	Term start	Term end	Days in office
Darko Horvat	HDZ	23 July 2020	19 February 2022	576
Dunja Magaš (acting)	HDZ	21 February 2022	9 March 2022	1,625
Ivan Paladina	Ind.	9 March 2022	17 January 2023	1,609
Branko Bačić	HDZ	17 January 2023	Incumbent	1,295

=== Notes ===
nb 1. Served as Minister of Construction, Housing-Communal Works, and Protection of Human Environment
nb 2. Served as Minister of Environment, Physical Planning and Construction
nb 3. Served as Minister of Construction and Environment
nb 4. Served as Minister of Physical Planning, Construction and Housing
nb 5. Served as Minister of Public Works, Construction and Reconstruction
nb 6. Served as Minister of Environment Protection, Spatial Planning and Construction

== See also ==
- Ministry of State Property (Croatia)
- Ministry of Environmental and Nature Protection (Croatia)
