= Ministry of Economy (Republic of Croatia) =

Ministry of the Croatian government

Ministry of Economy Ministarstvo gospodarstva
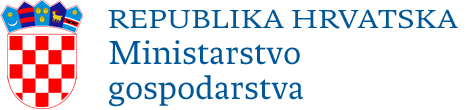

Ministry overview
- Formed: 31 May 1990; 36 years ago
- Type: Ministry in the Government of Croatia
- Jurisdiction: Croatia
- Headquarters: Ulica grada Vukovara 78, Zagreb, Croatia
- Employees: 495 (2025 estimate)
- Budget: €815 million (2025 budget)
- Website: mingo.gov.hr

Minister
- Currently: Ante Šušnjar since 17 May 2024

The Ministry of Economy of the Republic of Croatia (Croatian: Ministarstvo gospodarstva) is the ministry in the Government of Croatia which is in charge of the development of the economy, and conducting administrative and other tasks related to:

- industry, except food and tobacco industry, shipbuilding, energy, mining, trade, cooperatives, other than agricultural, small and medium businesses, trade, trade policy, and policy to protect domestic production; economic cooperation with foreign countries,
- involvement in European economic integration, the harmonization of activities in conjunction with the Croatian membership in the World Trade Organization and participation in multilateral trade negotiations in the framework of this organization,
- promotion of exports and foreign investment, the establishment and operation of free zones, systematic stimulation of entrepreneurship, state of market, supplies and prices, consumer protection, strategic stockpiles, the privatization of shares and stakes in the state owned companies, restructuring and rehabilitation of legal entities,
- safety at work.

== List of ministers ==
Minister	Party	Term start	Term end	Days in office
Ivan Čermak	HDZ	20 May 1993	12 October 1993	145
Nadan Vidošević	HDZ	12 October 1993	18 September 1995	706
Zlatko Mateša	HDZ	18 September 1995	7 November 1995	50
Davor Štern	HDZ	7 November 1995	14 April 1997	524
Nenad Porges	HDZ	14 April 1997	27 January 2000	1,018
Goranko Fižulić	HSLS	27 January 2000	21 March 2002	784
Hrvoje Vojković	HSLS	21 March 2002	30 July 2002	131
Ljubo Jurčić	Ind.	30 July 2002	23 December 2003	511
Branko Vukelić	HDZ	23 December 2003	12 January 2008	1,481
Damir Polančec	HDZ	12 January 2008	30 October 2009	657
Đuro Popijač	HDZ	19 November 2009	23 December 2011	764
Radimir Čačić	HNS-LD	23 December 2011	14 November 2012	327
Tamara Obradović-Mazal (acting)	Ind.	14 November 2012	16 November 2012	2
Ivan Vrdoljak	HNS-LD	16 November 2012	22 January 2016	1,162
Tomislav Panenić	Most	22 January 2016	19 October 2016	271
Martina Dalić	HDZ	19 October 2016	14 May 2018	572
Darko Horvat	HDZ	25 May 2018	23 July 2020	790
Tomislav Ćorić	HDZ	23 July 2020	29 April 2022	645
Davor Filipović	HDZ	29 April 2022	12 December 2023	1,667
Damir Habijan	HDZ	12 December 2023	17 May 2024	1,075
Ante Šušnjar	DP	17 May 2024	Incumbent	919

=== Ministers of Crafts, Small and Mid-sized Entrepreneurship (2000–2003) ===
Minister	Party	Term start	Term end	Days in office
Željko Pecek	HSS	27 January 2000	23 December 2003	1,426

=== Ministers of Entrepreneurship and Crafts (2011–2016) ===
Minister	Party	Term start	Term end	Days in office
Gordan Maras	SDP	23 December 2011	22 January 2016	1,491
Darko Horvat	HDZ	22 January 2016	19 October 2016	271

== Origins ==
The Ministry of Economy was not included as such in the first four Croatian Governments. The Cabinet of Stjepan Mesić and the Cabinet of Josip Manolić included the minister for social planning (Croatian: društveno planiranje; post held by Stjepan Zdunić) and the minister of energy and industry (Croatian: energetika i industrija; Božo Udovičić). In the Cabinet of Franjo Gregurić, the former minister became the minister of economic development (Croatian: gospodarski razvitak), and there was also a minister of trade (Croatian: trgovina; Petar Kriste, Branko Mikša). The Cabinet of Hrvoje Šarinić in turn included the minister of industry, shipbuilding and energy (Croatian: industrija, brodogradnja i energetika; Franjo Kajfež) and the minister of tourism and trade (Croatian: turizam i trgovina; Branko Mikša).

In the Cabinet of Zlatko Mateša, the prime minister also talked of renaming the ministry of economy back into the ministry of industry and energy. In the Cabinet of Andrej Plenković in October 2016 the Ministry of Economy was merged with the Ministry of Entrepreneurship and Crafts into the Ministry of Economy, Small and Medium Entrepreneurship and Crafts.
