= Dalić =

Dalić (Croatian pronunciation: [dǎːlitɕ]) is a Croatian surname. Notable people with the surname include:

- Martina Dalić (born 1967), Croatian economist
- Zlatko Dalić (born 1966), Croatian footballer and manager
