= Goran Marić =

Goran Marić may refer to:

- Goran Marić (footballer) (born 1984), Serbian footballer
- Goran Marić (volleyball) (born 1981), Serbian volleyball player
- Goran Marić (politician) (fl. 2016–2019), Croatian Minister of State Property
