= 1993 Zagreb local elections =

Local elections in Croatia

- 7 February 1993

60 seats to the Zagreb Assembly
- Turnout: 67.63%
	First party	Second party
Candidate	Branko Mikša	Goran Granić
Party	HDZ	HSLS
Seats won	35 / 60	18 / 60
Popular vote	220,501	115,980
Percentage	46.60%	23.99%
HDZ—40–50% HDZ—<40%	HSLS-HNS—50–60% HSLS-HNS—40–50% HSLS-HNS—<40%
Mayor before election
Boris Buzančić
HDZ
Elected mayor
Branko Mikša
HDZ

The 1993 local elections in Zagreb were held on 7 February 1993. These were the first local elections since Croatia gained independence. The Croatian Democratic Union (HDZ) won a majority in the Zagreb Assembly with 35 seats out of 60 and Branko Mikša became the new Mayor of Zagreb.

== Results ==
Party	Votes	%	Seats	%
Croatian Democratic Union; Hrvatska demokratska zajednica	220,501	46.60%	35	58.3%
Croatian Social Liberal Party; Hrvatska socijalno-liberalna stranka	115,980	23.99%	18	30%
Croatian Peasant Party; Hrvatska seljačka stranka	43,516	9%	3	5%
Social Democratic Party of Croatia; Socijaldemokratska partija Hrvatske	36,836	7.62%	2	3,3%
Croatian People's Party; Hrvatska narodna stranka	11,804	2.44%	2	3,3%
Others	43,286	9.17%	0	0%
Total	471,923	100%	60	100%
Registered Voters/Turnout	714,903	67.63%		

The Croatian Democratic Union (HDZ) won 46.60% of the votes or 220,501 and gained 35 out of 60 seats in the Assembly. The Croatian Social Liberal Party (HSLS) came second with 115,980 or 23.99% of the votes and 18 seats. Branko Mikša of the HDZ party was elected mayor. Half of the 60 members of the Assembly were elected proportionally using the D'Hondt method, and half were elected in 30 electoral districts by a majority system. The HSLS and the HNS competed together in most electoral districts, while the HDZ went independently.

== See also ==
- List of mayors of Zagreb
