= Ante Šušnjar =

Croatian politician (born 1983)

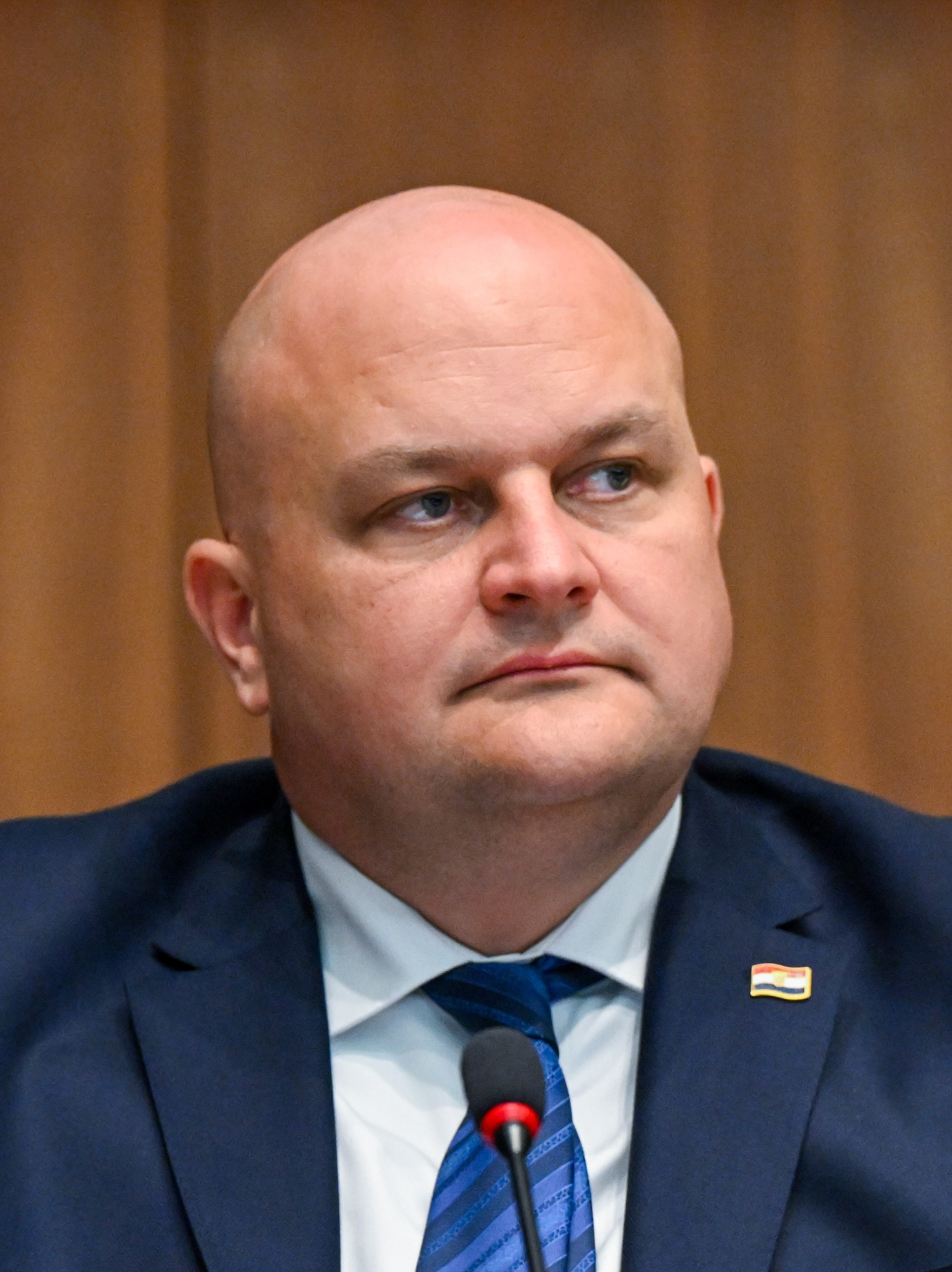
- Šušnjar in 2025

Minister of Economy
- Incumbent
- Assumed office 17 May 2024
- Prime Minister: Andrej Plenković
- Preceded by: Damir Habijan

Personal details
- Born: 27 January 1983 (age 43) Mostar, SR Bosnia and Herzegovina, SFR Yugoslavia (modern Bosnia and Herzegovina)
- Party: Homeland Movement (since 2020)
- Relatives: Zvonko Jurišić (uncle)

Ante Šušnjar (born 27 January 1983) is a Croatian politician of the Homeland Movement serving as minister of economy since 2024. He graduated from the University of Split in 2006 and worked as a lawyer and bankruptcy trustee. He is a member of the presidency of the Homeland Movement.
