= Ivan Vrdoljak =

Croatian politician and engineer

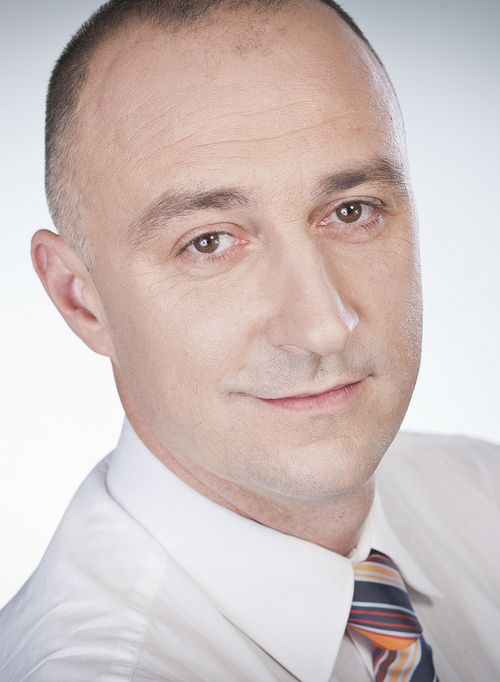

President of the Croatian People's Party
- In office 17 December 2017 – 24 May 2020
- Preceded by: Predrag Štromar (Acting)
- Succeeded by: Predrag Štromar
- In office 16 April 2016 – 6 June 2017
- Preceded by: Vesna Pusić
- Succeeded by: Predrag Štromar (Acting)

Minister of Economy
- In office 16 November 2012 – 22 January 2016
- Prime Minister: Zoran Milanović
- Preceded by: Radimir Čačić
- Succeeded by: Tomislav Panenić

Minister of Construction
- In office 23 December 2011 – 16 November 2012
- Prime Minister: Zoran Milanović
- Preceded by: Branko Bačić
- Succeeded by: Anka Mrak-Taritaš

Personal details
- Born: 22 June 1972 (age 54) Osijek, SR Croatia, SFR Yugoslavia (modern Croatia)
- Party: Croatian People's Party
- Spouse: Ivana Vrdoljak
- Children: 3
- Education: University of Osijek

Ivan Vrdoljak (Croatian pronunciation: [ǐʋan ʋr̩dǒʎaːk]; born 22 June 1972) is a Croatian entrepreneur and former politician. He held a number of high-ranking positions throughout his political career, including Chairman of the Croatian People's Party and Deputy Speaker of the Croatian Parliament.

== Education ==
Ivan Vrdoljak was born in Osijek, where he attended primary school, grammar school (mathematics and computer science program), and the Faculty of Electrical Engineering, where he earned his degree in electrical engineering. He was the president of the IAESTE local student branch at the Faculty of Electrical Engineering in Osijek, as well as one of the founders and leaders of the Osijek Electrical Engineering Students' Club (1993). He also attended the Council of Europe's Academy for Political Development, graduating in 2005.

== Early business career ==
In the early stages of his career, he worked as a designer for RPM Engeharia in Brazil, as an engineer trainee for Nova Livana in Osijek, and as a project manager for automation and management processes for Neo Inžinjering. He started the company ATO Inžinjering in Osijek with his colleagues in 2001, and served as a director there. He stepped back from ownership of ATO Inženjering in 2008 to serve as Deputy Mayor of the City of Osijek.

== Political career ==
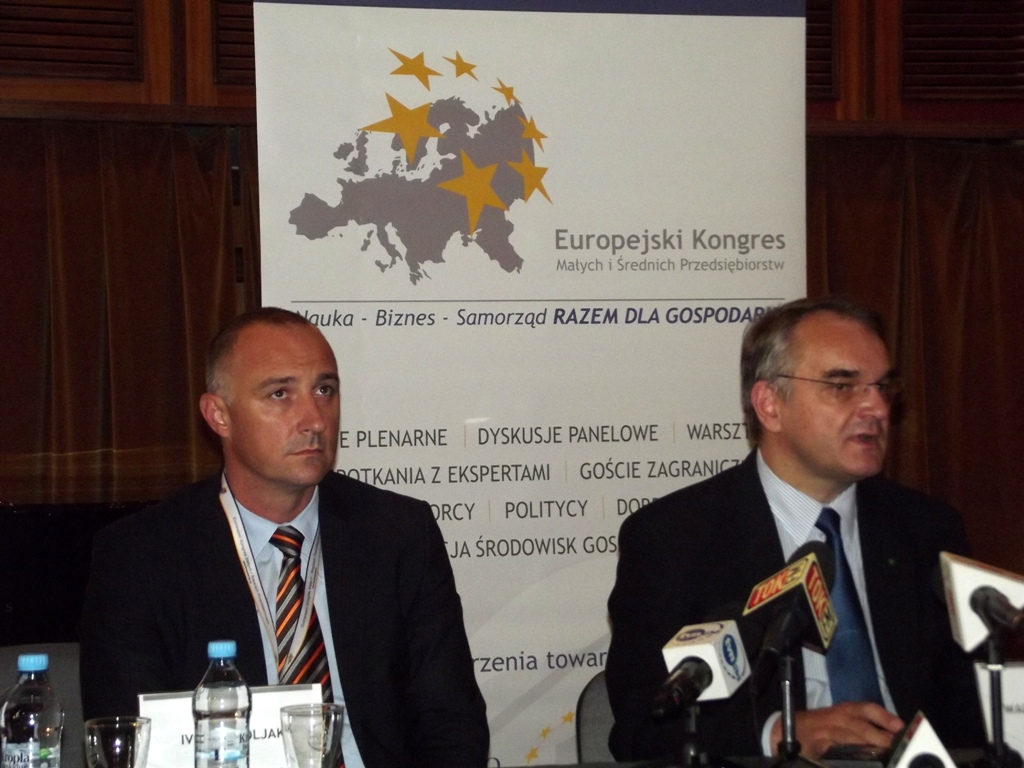
Ivan Vrdoljak and Waldemar Pawlak

Between 2000 and 2011, Ivan Vrdoljak held key positions in Osijek HNS and Osijek-Baranja County HNS, as well as key positions in local self-government units – in 2004, he was elected to the Osijek-Baranja County Assembly as a councillor; in 2006, he was elected to the Osijek City Council, and in 2008, he was elected Deputy Mayor of the City of Osijek in charge of social affairs and economy.

In the 2011 parliamentary elections he was elected to the Croatian Parliament for the first time, as a candidate on the list of the so-called Kukuriku Coalition (HNS, SDP, IDS, HSU), but instead of serving as a member of Parliament, he served as a minister in the twelfth Croatian government - first as the Minister of Construction and Physical Planning, and then as the Minister of Economy a year later.

He was re-elected to the Croatian Parliament twice more, in 2015 and 2016, both times with the most preferential votes (over eight thousand votes).

In 2016, he was elected chairman of the Croatian People's Party - Liberal Democrats, and he was also elected deputy speaker of the Croatian Parliament following the formation of the Parliament’s ninth term. He resigned from all political positions in June 2017, only to be re-elected as party chairman in December of the same year. The end of the chairmanship in 2020 marked the end of Ivan Vrdoljak’s active political career.

== Continued business career ==
Ivan Vrdoljak founded the company Livit d.o.o. in September 2018, observing the legal requirement of a one-year period following the end of a state official's term of office. Livit is the holder of the global project "The Economist: The World in [2021]” in the Republic of Croatia, which consists of a diplomatic-business conference and the publication of a global magazine of the same name in Croatian. Livit is also concerned with environmental protection through waste recovery. That aspect of the business is handled by Eko Livit d.o.o., Livit's sister company.

Ivan Vrdoljak also acts as a private investor in several different projects, including housing construction in Split, tourism in Rovinj and Highlander - a global mountaineering adventure project launched by a handful of Croatian enthusiasts based in Osijek. Ivan Vrdoljak is not only an investor in the Highlander project, but also its chief financial officer.
