= Radimir Čačić =

Croatian politician and businessman

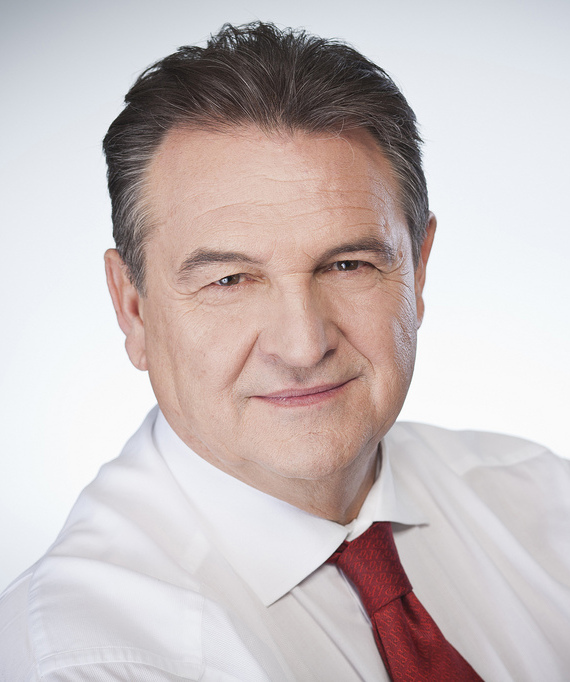

Prefect of the Varaždin County
- In office 9 June 2017 – 30 May 2021
- Deputy: Tomislav Paljak; Robert Vugrin
- Preceded by: Predrag Štromar
- Succeeded by: Anđelko Stričak
- In office 9 June 2005 – 20 June 2008
- Deputy: Predrag Štromar
- Preceded by: Zvonimir Sabati
- Succeeded by: Zvonimir Sabati

Deputy Prime Minister of Croatia
- In office 23 December 2011 – 14 November 2012 Serving with Neven Mimica, Branko Grčić and Milanka Opačić
- Prime Minister: Zoran Milanović
- Preceded by: Slobodan Uzelac; Domagoj Ivan Milošević
- Succeeded by: Vesna Pusić

Minister of Economy
- In office 23 December 2011 – 14 November 2012
- Prime Minister: Zoran Milanović
- Preceded by: Đuro Popijač
- Succeeded by: Ivan Vrdoljak

Minister of Public Works, Construction and Reconstruction
- In office 27 January 2000 – 23 December 2003
- Prime Minister: Ivica Račan
- Preceded by: Position established
- Succeeded by: Position abolished

President of the People's Party – Reformists
- Incumbent
- Assumed office 28 September 2014
- Preceded by: Position established

President of the Croatian People's Party
- In office 2008–2013
- Preceded by: Vesna Pusić
- Succeeded by: Vesna Pusić
- In office 1995–2000
- Preceded by: Savka Dabčević-Kučar
- Succeeded by: Vesna Pusić

Personal details
- Born: 11 May 1949 (age 77) Zagreb, PR Croatia, FPR Yugoslavia (modern Croatia)
- Party: NS-R (2013–present); HNS (1990–2013)
- Education: University of Zagreb
- Awards: Order of Duke Domagoj

Military service
- Allegiance: Croatia
- Branch/service: Croatian Army
- Years of service: 2001–present
- Rank: Honorary brigadier

Radimir Čačić (pronounced [râdimiːr tʃâtʃitɕ]; born 11 May 1949) is a Croatian politician and businessman who has been President of the People's Party – Reformists (NS-R) since the party's formation in 2014, as well as Prefect of Varaždin County from 2017 to 2021.

Čačić previously served as President of the Croatian People's Party (HNS) between 1995 and 2000. Following the 2000 Croatian parliamentary election, he became part of the first cabinet of Ivica Račan where he notably spearheaded the construction of motorways.

He was elected president of the HNS again in 2008. Following the 2011 parliamentary election, as the leader of the second-largest party in the four-party Kukuriku coalition alliance, Čačić became Deputy Prime Minister, as well as Minister of Economy, in the cabinet of Zoran Milanović.

After causing a car crash that resulted in two fatalities, a Hungarian court sentenced him to 22 months in prison in November 2012. He resigned from his government post, and was ejected from the HNS in 2013. After serving his prison sentence, Čačić returned to politics with a new political party, the People's Party – Reformists. In 2017 he was elected the prefect of Varaždin County for the second time.

== Early life ==
After graduating from the Faculty of Architecture at the University of Zagreb in 1973, he worked for a Zagreb company before moving to Varaždin and joining the construction company Zagorje. Together with several partners, in 1979 he left Zagorje and founded the construction company DP Coning. In 1989, the Yugoslav Chamber of Commerce awarded him with the title of manager of the year. Čačić amassed considerable wealth in the process, and when the laws were changed in March 1989 to allow for privatization, he spent 750,000 German marks to buy a 25% stake in his old company Zagorje, and later merged the two companies, with some jobs being lost in the process.

== Political career ==
=== 1990s ===
He first entered politics in the Coalition of People's Accord (KNS) in 1989, but with no electoral success. In 1990 and 1991, with Čačić as the director, Coning was involved in a failed construction project in Dubrovnik.

During the Croatian War of Independence, Čačić was a brigadier of the fledgling Croatian Army. In the Battle of the Barracks, he led the September 1991 negotiations with the Yugoslav People's Army to abandon the Varaždin barracks and was used as a hostage to make sure disarmed army members were safely escorted to Serbia. He was later awarded the Homeland War Memorial Medal and the Order of Duke Domagoj.

In 1991–92, Coning was involved in another much larger failed construction project in Israel, for which the company was later involved in multimillion-dollar lawsuits. DP Coning was transformed into Coning holding with several daughter companies, and the Holding was later renamed Ingprojekt. This transaction was later undone in a court of law, but Čačić had since sold or transferred his stakes in the Coning companies to a legal firm. Čačić's business affairs were commonly used against him when he became more active in politics, and for the Israel case he was once defamed by Miroslav Rožić. By 1995, he was one of the few Croatian politicians who were wealthy prior to entering a public office, although his wealth would later multiply during the course of his political activity.

He succeeded Savka Dabčević-Kučar as President of the Croatian People's Party (HNS) and held the position for six years. He in turn was succeeded by Vesna Pusić, while Čačić became the president of the central committee of the party. He became a member of the Croatian Parliament after the 1995 parliamentary election.

=== 2000s ===
In the 2000 parliamentary election, the HNS won more seats in the Croatian Parliament and participated in the six-party coalition that formed the government under Ivica Račan. Čačić was the only member of HNS in the government but was given the influential and suitable position of the Minister of Public Works, Reconstruction and Building which granted him access to many government-sponsored projects.

Čačić was instrumental in reviving the project to build the Zagreb–Split highway, arranging a more viable financing model – one that did not favour Bechtel Corporation so much as the contracts signed by the Croatian Democratic Union (HDZ) did, both before and after Čačić. The ministry invited tenders in order to choose the construction companies which would build the new road, and this method proved successful in getting the building under way. When Čačić exited the office, the sections from Karlovac to Zadar were mostly completed and the rest were also partially built.

Čačić also helped organize the public state-sponsored housing project for young families, the first such endeavour in modern-day Croatia. The buildings were later nicknamed Čačićevi stanovi (Čačić apartments) after him.

After the 2003 parliamentary election, the HNS returned to the opposition but Čačić retained a seat in the Parliament.

The new HDZ leadership organized a parliamentary investigation panel on Čačić's alleged misdeeds: he was accused of conflict of interest given how his old company Coning was also awarded contracts in building the Zagreb–Split highway. However, after the subsequent inquiry, Čačić was cleared of all charges. In December 2006, the HDZ parliamentary investigation panel again convened and changed its previous decision, saying Čačić was indeed in conflict of interest because of twelve contracts worth 132 million Croatian kunas signed with companies with a connection to Čačić, without this connection being properly registered according to relevant law. He in turn insisted that this was a meaningless distinction and that he was already disassociated from his old companies, and tried to get the decision reversed in court, but his plea was rejected by a Zagreb court in 2007. His appeal against the verdict was ultimately rejected by the Constitutional Court of Croatia in 2010.

In 2005 his party won the local elections in Varaždin County and Čačić became the prefect of the county on 9 June. He was replaced in June 2008, after two HNS deputies in the county council switched sides to the opposition.

=== 2010s ===
On 8 January 2010, he caused a severe traffic accident on the M7 motorway in Hungary which resulted in the death of two passengers in the car he hit. Čačić's Chrysler 300 rear-ended a Škoda Fabia in dense fog. In 2011, Čačić caused two more traffic accidents in Zagreb, both times without causing injury. The 2010 incident led to Čačić handing in his resignation as president of the Croatian Tennis Association, which was later refused by the federation's governing board.

Čačić represented HNS in the Kukuriku coalition and was the top-listed candidate for the 3rd electoral district at the 2011 parliamentary election. In the district they won 52.73% of the vote. Following the overall election win, Čačić became Deputy Prime Minister in the cabinet of Zoran Milanović.

On 29 June 2012 the court of first instance found him guilty for the car accident and sentenced him to 1 year and three months on probation. Croatian opposition politicians Tomislav Karamarko, Jadranka Kosor and Dragutin Lesar called for Čačić to resign; members of the ruling coalition Mirela Holy and Josip Leko expressed reservations about the issue. On 14 November 2012 the court of second instance confirmed the verdict and increased his sentence to 22 months in prison. The same day, Čačić resigned from the Croatian Government.

Čačić was ejected from the HNS in January 2014. He was released from prison in June 2014 after serving a year out of his 22-month sentence.

On 28 September 2014 he became the first president of the People's Party – Reformists.

Political offices
Preceded by Ministry created	Minister of Public Works, Construction and Reconstruction; 2000–2003	Succeeded by Ministry dissolved
Preceded by Zvonimir Sabati	Prefect of Varaždin County; 2005–2008	Succeeded by Zvonimir Sabati
Preceded by Slobodan Uzelac and Domagoj Ivan Milošević	Deputy Prime Minister; Serving alongside Neven Mimica, Branko Grčić and Milanka Opačić; 2011–2012	Succeeded by Vesna Pusić, Neven Mimica, Branko Grčić and Milanka Opačić
Preceded by Đuro Popijač	Minister of Economy; 2011–2012	Succeeded by Ivan Vrdoljak
Party political offices
Preceded by Savka Dabčević-Kučar	President of Croatian People's Party; 1995–2000	Succeeded by Vesna Pusić
Preceded by Vesna Pusić	President of Croatian People's Party; 2008–2013	Succeeded by Vesna Pusić
Preceded by Position created	President of People's Party – Reformists; 2014–present	Incumbent
Sporting positions
Preceded by Slaven Letica	President of the Croatian Tennis Association; 2002–2012	Succeeded by Franjo Luković
