= Ivan Paladina =

Croatian politician (born 1983)

Minister of Construction, Physical Planning and State Property
- In office 9 March 2022 – 17 January 2023
- Prime Minister: Andrej Plenković
- Preceded by: Darko Horvat; Dunja Magaš (Acting)
- Succeeded by: Branko Bačić

Personal details
- Born: 12 July 1983 (age 43) Rijeka, SR Croatia, SFR Yugoslavia
- Party: Independent
- Spouse: Martina Paladina
- Children: 3
- Education: University of Zagreb

Ivan Paladina (born 12 June 1983) is a Croatian economist, consultant and politician who served as the Minister of Construction, Physical Planning and State Property from 2022 to 2023.

While working as a consultant, he was involved in multiple projects tied to Russian and Israeli investors in Croatia, including the controversial and never-realized Kupari and Golf investment projects near Dubrovnik.

== Early life and education ==
Paladina was born on 12 June 1983 in Rijeka, Croatia, than part of SFR Yugoslavia.

In 2006 he received a Master's degree in Economics from the Faculty of Economics at the University of Zagreb.

== Professional career ==
He worked in various companies in managerial and executive positions. He was, among others, deputy director at Razvoj golf company and chairman of the supervisory board at Hidroelektra niskogradnja company. He ran his own company Delta savjetovanje, he was also a member of the board of directors and from 2015 to 2017 the president of Institut IGH, a company operating in the construction sector. He served as a director in Avenue ulaganja and as an advisor to the board of directors of Hrvatska poštanska banka.

In March 2022 (as a non-partisan on the recommendation of the Croatian Democratic Union), he became Ministry of Construction, Spatial Planning and State Property in the second government of Andrej Plenković.

== See also ==
- Cabinet of Andrej Plenković II
