= Branko Mikša =

Croatian politician (born 1947)

President of the Croatian Football Federation
- In office 2 June 1997 – 18 December 1998
- Preceded by: Josip Šoić
- Succeeded by: Vlatko Marković

Mayor of Zagreb
- In office April 1993 – 2 March 1996
- Preceded by: Boris Buzančić
- Succeeded by: Marina Matulović-Dropulić

Minister of Tourism and Trade
- In office 12 August 1992 – 3 April 1993
- Prime Minister: Hrvoje Šarinić
- Preceded by: Anton Marčelo Popović
- Succeeded by: Niko Bulić

Minister of Trade
- In office 15 April 1992 – 12 August 1992
- Prime Minister: Franjo Gregurić
- Preceded by: Petar Kriste
- Succeeded by: Position abolished

Personal details
- Born: 13 February 1947 (age 79) Đurmanec, PR Croatia, FPR Yugoslavia
- Party: Croatian Democratic Union
- Education: Faculty of Economics, University of Zagreb

Branko Mikša (born 13 February 1947) is a Croatian retired politician. He was Minister of Trade (1992), Minister of Tourism and Trade (1992–93), and later Mayor of Zagreb from April 1993 to March 1996, following the 1993 local election.

During his tenure as mayor, the Importanne Center and a Sheraton hotel in Zagreb were built, and the Ante Starčević, Petar Preradović and King Tomislav Squares in Donji Grad were renovated. Medvedgrad, an old fortress near Sljeme, underwent renovation at that time.

Between 1997 and 1998, Mikša was the president of the Croatian Football Federation.

| Preceded by Boris Buzančić | Mayor of Zagreb; 1993–1996 | Succeeded by Marina Matulović-Dropulić |
| Preceded by Josip Šoić | President of Croatian Football Federation; June 1997 – October 1998 | Succeeded by Vlatko Marković |
