= Davor Filipović =

Croatian politician (born 1984)

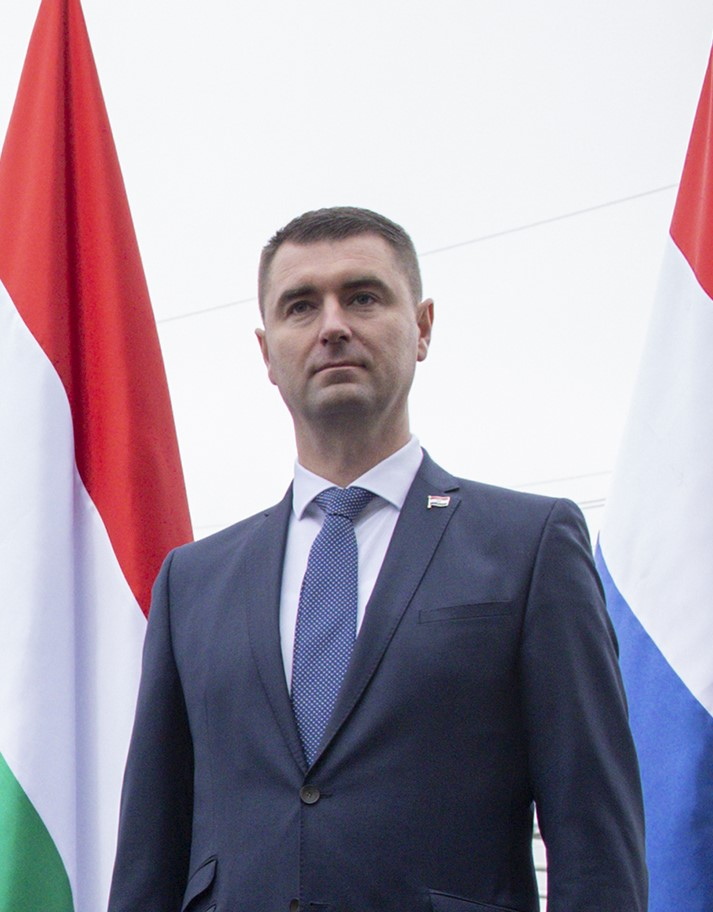
- Filipović in 2022

Minister of Economy and Sustainable Development
- In office 29 April 2022 – 12 December 2023
- Prime Minister: Andrej Plenković
- Preceded by: Tomislav Ćorić
- Succeeded by: Damir Habijan

Personal details
- Born: 10 June 1984 (age 42) Sarajevo, SR Bosnia and Herzegovina, SFR Yugoslavia
- Party: Croatian Democratic Union
- Education: University of Split University of Zagreb
- Scientific career
- Thesis: Modelling of exogenous and endogenous variables of the organization for a successful takeover of a company (2011)

Davor Filipović (born 10 June 1984) is a Croatian politician, and former Minister of Economy and Sustainable Development of Croatia. He is also a Doctor of Economics and a university associate professor of economics.

== Early life and education ==
Filipović was born on 10 June 1984 in Sarajevo. His father Ivan Filipović is a university professor and head of the Department of Forensic Sciences at the University of Split, and his mother Kata is a graduate economist.

Filipović attended elementary school in Sarajevo and Split, after moving to Makarska. During his studies, he discovered a passion for basketball, and after graduating from the School of Economics and Administration in Split in 2002, he also received a sports scholarship at Fairleigh Dickinson University in New Jersey. He stayed in the United States until 2004, where he continued to play basketball in the highest level of American college basketball (NCAA Division I) and completed four semesters of business management.

Filipović graduated from the Faculty of Economics in Split in 2006. He continued his postgraduate studies at the Faculty of Economics and Business in Zagreb. He received his doctorate in 2011 on the topic: "Modelling of exogenous and endogenous variables of the organization for a successful takeover of a company" (Croatian: Modeliranje egzogenih i endogenih varijabli organizacije za uspješno preuzimanje poduzeća). He continued further training at the Harvard Kennedy School - John F. Kennedy School of Government in 2014.

At the Faculty of Economics and Business in Zagreb, Filipović worked as an assistant, senior assistant and assistant professor from 2008 to 2019, and as an associate professor from 2019.

== Political career ==
Filipović was a member of the City Assembly of the City of Zagreb for two terms, while chairman of the Finance Committee and a member of many other committees. He was the president of the supervisory board of Croatian Forests and a member of the supervisory board of INA d.d.

Filipović was HDZ's candidate for mayor of Zagreb in 2021. He was the secretary of the main board of HDZ Zagreb, and he is a member of the presidency of HDZ since 2022 while also the president of the Academic Community "Dr. Ante Starčević".

Filipović became Minister of Economy and Sustainable Development in the Government of Andrej Plenković in April 2022. In this position he attended the 2023 World Economic Forum Annual Meeting. His tenure as minister ended on 12 December 2023.
