= List of prefects of Varaždin County =

This is a list of prefects of Varaždin County.

== Prefects of Varaždin County (1993–present) ==
Croatian Peasant Party (HSS)
Croatian Democratic Union (HDZ)
Croatian People's Party – Liberal Democrats (HNS – LD)
People's Party - Reformists (NS–R)

№	Portrait	Name (Born–Died)	Term of Office		Party
1		Zvonimir Sabati (1957–)	4 May 1993	24 October 1995	HSS
2		Marijan Mlinarić (1943–2007)	24 October 1995	20 June 2001	HDZ
3		Zvonimir Sabati (1957–)	20 June 2001	9 June 2005	HSS
4		Radimir Čačić (1949–)	9 June 2005	20 June 2008	HNS – LD
5		Zvonimir Sabati (1957–)	20 June 2008	May 2009	HSS
6		Predrag Štromar (1969–)	May 2009	9 June 2017	HNS – LD
7		Radimir Čačić (1949–)	9 June 2017	30 May 2021	NS – Reformists
8		Anđelko Stričak (1973–)	30 May 2021	Incumbent	HDZ

== See also ==
- Varaždin County
