= Vlatko Marković =

Croatian footballer and manager

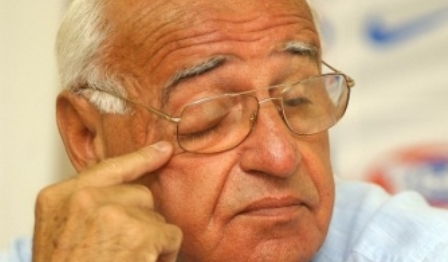
- Marković in 2012

President of the Croatian Football Federation
- In office 18 December 1998 – 5 July 2012
- Preceded by: Branko Mikša
- Succeeded by: Davor Šuker

Personal details
- Born: Vladimir Marković; 1 January 1937 Bugojno, Kingdom of Yugoslavia
- Died: 23 September 2013 (aged 76) Zagreb, Croatia
- Occupation: Footballer; football manager; football administrator
Association football career
- Position: Defender
Senior career*
Years	Team	Apps	(Gls)
1955–1956	Iskra Bugojno		
1956–1958	Čelik Zenica		
1958–1965	Dinamo Zagreb	104	(2)
1965–1966	La Gantoise	1	(0)
1966–1967	Wiener Sport-Club	25	(19)
1967–1968	Austria Wien	6	(4)
International career
1958–1959	Yugoslavia U21	3	(0)
1961–1962	Yugoslavia	16	(0)
Managerial career
- 1969–1973: Yugoslavia U23
- 1970–1973: NK Zagreb
- 1973: Standard Liège
- 1974–1976: OGC Nice
- 1977–1978: Hajduk Split
- 1978–1980: Dinamo Zagreb
- 1980–1981: OGC Nice
- 1983–1984: Dinamo Zagreb
- 1985–1986: Rapid Wien
- 1988–1989: Rapid Wien
- 1990–1991: Dinamo Zagreb
- 1992: HAŠK Građanski
- 1993–1994: Croatia
- * Club domestic league appearances and goals

Vladimir "Vlatko" Marković (Croatian pronunciation: [ʋlǎdimiːr ʋlâtko mǎːrkoʋitɕ]; 1 January 1937 – 23 September 2013) was a Croatian professional football manager and player who served as the president of the Croatian Football Federation from 1998 to 2012.

== Playing career ==
=== Club ===
He played for: Iskra (Bugojno), Čelik (Zenica), Dinamo (Zagreb), Wiener SC (Vienna).

=== International ===
From 1958 until 1959 he played three matches for Yugoslavia national under-21 football team, and from 7 May 1961 (debut against Hungary) until 30 September 1962 (final game against West Germany) he played in defense for Yugoslavia and scored one own goal in 16 matches. He played in all matches on 1962 FIFA World Cup when Yugoslavia finished 4th.

== Managerial career ==
After he finished his playing career, he coached Zagreb (Zagreb), Standard de Liège (Liège), OGC Nice (Nice), Hajduk (Split) and Dinamo (Zagreb). With Dinamo he won Yugoslav Cup in 1980.

From 1974 to 1978 he was a FIFA instructor. He also participated in the FIFA Coca-Cola-program.

He was elected president of the Croatian Football Federation on 18 December 1998. He was reelected in 2002 and on 16 December 2006, again with unanimous support. He resigned at 15 May 2012.

== Personal life ==
In 1945, his uncles died during the Yugoslav death march of Nazi collaborators. In SFRY, his father spent over 15 years in prison for possessing illegal firearm.

=== Views ===
In November 2010, Marković spoke out against gay footballers, telling both the Croatian Večernji list and the Serbian Večernje novosti that, "As long as I'm president [of the Croatian football federation] there will be no gay players. Thank goodness only healthy people play football." He has been reported for the comment to UEFA. In July 2011, in response to his comments, he was charged €10,000 by UEFA.

=== Death ===
He died at Zagreb in 2013. He was 76.

== Managerial statistics ==
Team	From	To	Record				
Team	From	To	G	W	D	L	Win %
Yugoslavia U23	May 1969	June 1973	22	8	4	10	36.36
NK Zagreb	July 1970	June 1973	98	63	16	19	64.29
Standard Liège	July 1973	October 1973	9	5	2	2	55.56
OGC Nice	June 1974	November 1976	101	42	26	33	41.58
Hajduk Split	July 1977	June 1978	43	18	13	12	41.86
Dinamo Zagreb	21 June 1978	29 June 1980	77	34	26	17	44.16
OGC Nice	July 1980	August 1981	39	10	12	17	25.64
Dinamo Zagreb	20 September 1983	25 April 1984	24	9	7	8	37.50
Rapid Wien	1 July 1985	30 June 1986	48	30	11	7	62.50
Rapid Wien	19 September 1988	30 June 1989	28	15	3	10	53.57
Dinamo Zagreb	28 November 1990	22 July 1991	22	15	5	2	68.18
HAŠK Građanski	22 April 1992	7 July 1992	15	6	4	5	40.00
Croatia	April 1993	June 1994	1	1	0	0	100.00
Total			526	256	129	141	48.67

== Honours ==
=== Player ===
Dinamo Zagreb

- Yugoslav Cup: 1960, 1963

=== Manager ===
Yugoslavia U-23

- Under-23 Challenge Cup: 1969
- Balkan Youth Championship: 1972

NK Zagreb

- Yugoslav Second League: 1972–73

Dinamo Zagreb

- Yugoslav Cup: 1980

=== Individual ===
- Matija Ljubek Award: 2002
- HNS's Trophy Trophies: 2003
- Franjo Bučar State Award for Sport: 2008
- UEFA Amicale des Anciens: 2009
- Holder of title Dragon of Bosna Argentina in Brethren of the Croatian Dragon

Sporting positions
Preceded by Branko Mikša	President of the Croatian Football Federation; December 1998 – July 2012	Succeeded by Davor Šuker
