= Ministry of Entrepreneurship and Crafts (Croatia) =

Ministry of the Croatian government

Ministry of Entrepreneurship and Crafts Ministarstvo poduzetništva i obrta

Ministry overview
- Formed: 23 December 2011
- Succeeding Ministry: Economy
- Type: Ministry in the Government of Croatia
- Jurisdiction: Croatia
- Headquarters: Ulica Grada Vukovara 78, Zagreb, Croatia
- Employees: 110 (2015)
- Budget: ▲HRK 1.250 billion (2015)
- Website: mingo.gov.hr

The Ministry of Entrepreneurship and Crafts of the Republic of Croatia (Croatian: Ministarstvo poduzetništva i obrta) was a ministry in the Government of Croatia which is in charge of the administrative and other tasks related to small and medium enterprises, crafts, cooperatives, promotion of exports and foreign investment and improving competitiveness. In the Cabinet of Andrej Plenković in 2016 it was merged with the Ministry of Economy into the Ministry of Economy, Small and Medium Entrepreneurship and Crafts.

== List of ministers ==
=== Ministers of Crafts, Small and Mid-sized Entrepreneurship (2000-2003) ===
Minister	Party	Term start	Term end	Days in office
Željko Pecek	HSS	27 January 2000	23 December 2003	1,426

=== Ministers of Entrepreneurship and Crafts (2011-2016) ===
Minister	Party	Term start	Term end	Days in office
Gordan Maras	SDP	23 December 2011	22 January 2016	1,491
Darko Horvat	HDZ	22 January 2016	19 October 2016	271
