= Darko Horvat (politician) =

Croatian politician (born 1970)

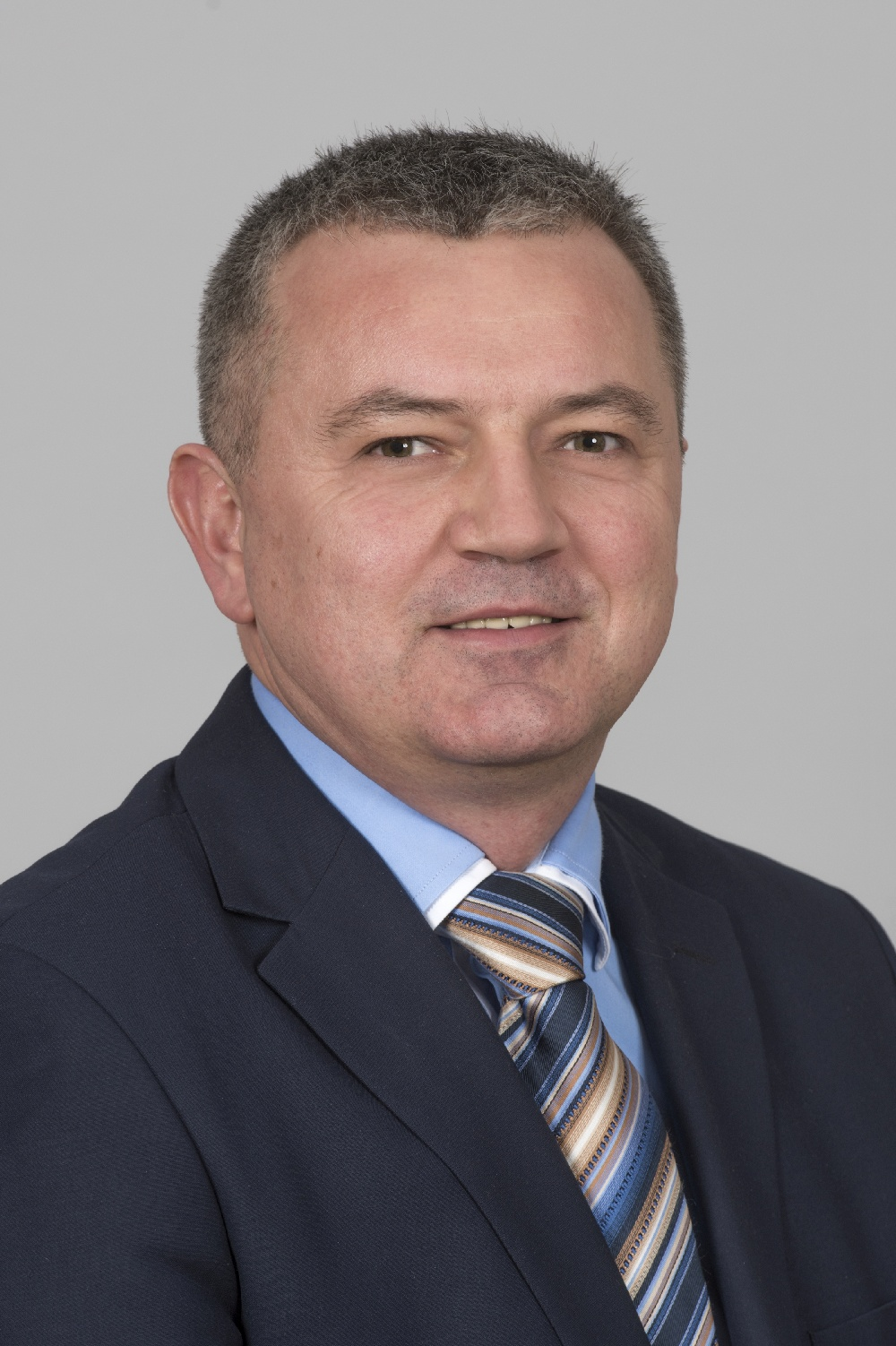
- Official portrait, 2016

Minister of Construction, Physical Planning and State Property
- In office 23 July 2020 – 19 February 2022
- Prime Minister: Andrej Plenković
- Preceded by: Predrag Štromar (Minister of Construction and Physical Planning); Mario Banožić (Minister of State Property)
- Succeeded by: Dunja Magaš (Acting); Ivan Paladina

Minister of Economy and Sustainable Development
- In office 25 May 2018 – 23 July 2020
- Prime Minister: Andrej Plenković
- Preceded by: Martina Dalić
- Succeeded by: Tomislav Ćorić

Minister of Entrepreneurship and Crafts
- In office 22 January 2016 – 14 October 2016
- Prime Minister: Tihomir Orešković
- Preceded by: Gordan Maras
- Succeeded by: Martina Dalić (Minister of Economy)

Member of the Croatian Parliament
- In office 19 October 2016 – 25 May 2018
- Constituency: III electoral district
- In office 28 December 2015 – 22 January 2016
- Succeeded by: Josip Križanić (Acting)
- Constituency: III electoral district

Personal details
- Born: 28 September 1970 (age 56) Donja Dubrava, SR Croatia, SFR Yugoslavia
- Party: Croatian Democratic Union (since 1999)
- Education: University of Maribor

Darko Horvat (born 28 September 1970) is a Croatian politician who served as Minister of Construction, Physical Planning and State Property in the Government of Croatia between 2020 and 2022, when he was arrested by USKOK for abuse of position. He is a member of the Croatian Democratic Union since 1999. His successor is Ivan Paladina.

== Early life and education ==
Horvat was born on 28 September 1970 in Donja Dubrava near Čakovec, SFR Yugoslavia. He attended elementary school in Čakovec. Horvat graduated from the Faculty of Electrical Engineering and Computing at the University of Maribor.

== See also ==
- Cabinet of Andrej Plenković I
- Cabinet of Andrej Plenković II
