= Martina Dalić =

Croatian economist and finance official

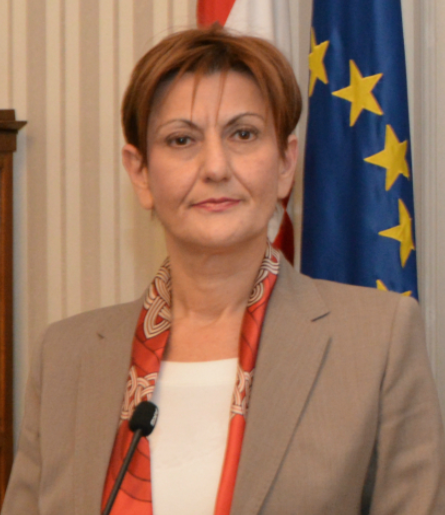
- Dalić in 2017

Deputy Prime Minister of Croatia
- In office 19 October 2016 – 14 May 2018 Serving with Damir Krstičević, Predrag Štromar and Marija Pejčinović Burić (from 19 July 2017)
- Prime Minister: Andrej Plenković
- Preceded by: Tomislav Karamarko; Božo Petrov
- Succeeded by: Tomislav Tolušić

Minister of Economy, Small and Medium Entrepreneurship and Crafts
- In office 19 October 2016 – 14 May 2018
- Prime Minister: Andrej Plenković
- Preceded by: Tomislav Panenić (Economy); Darko Horvat (Entrepreneurship and Crafts)

Minister of Finance
- In office 29 December 2010 – 23 December 2011
- Prime Minister: Jadranka Kosor
- Preceded by: Ivan Šuker
- Succeeded by: Slavko Linić

Personal details
- Born: Martina Štimac; 12 November 1967 (age 58) Velika Gorica, SR Croatia, SFR Yugoslavia
- Party: Croatian Democratic Union
- Spouse: Niko Dalić (m. 1992)
- Children: 2
- Education: University of Zagreb

Martina Dalić (pronounced [martǐːna dǎːlitɕ]; née Štimec; born 12 November 1967) is a Croatian economist and finance official who was a Deputy Prime Minister of Croatia and Minister of Economy, Small and Medium Entrepreneurship and Crafts in the Cabinet of Andrej Plenković.

She was the first female Minister of Economy in Croatia (excluding Tamara Obradović-Mazal's two-day acting tenure in 2012). She was previously Croatia's first, and to date only, female Minister of Finance, from 29 December 2010 to 23 December 2011, in the Cabinet of Jadranka Kosor. She is a member of the centre-right Croatian Democratic Union (HDZ) and resides in Zagreb.

Since February 2021, she has been the President of the Management Board of Podravka, a large food industry manufacturer.

== Early life and education ==
Born Martina Štimec in Velika Gorica to a father from Letovanić and a mother from Vrlika, Dalić graduated from the University of Zagreb Faculty of Economics and Business in 1990.

== Career ==
Dalić was hired by the Croatian finance ministry in 1995 as the head of the macroeconomic forecasting department under Finance Minister Božo Prka. In 1997, she became assistant minister. In 2000, she left the public sector and was employed at Privredna banka Zagreb as chief economist.

After HDZ returned to power following the 2003 election, Dalić returned to the ministry in 2004 and worked at the Central State Strategy Office (Središnji državni ured za strategiju), and was also the country's chief negotiator in matters pertaining to financial legislation during Croatia's European Union accession negotiations.

On 22 September 2014, Dalić left HDZ as she believed the party's program was unsuitable to resolve Croatia's economic crisis. In an open letter, she wrote: "Croatia can't handle another unprepared government which focuses on itself and only manages to deal with problems on the surface. For me, it is impossible to further participate in any party activities as I am convinced things will not be changing for the better. HDZ doesn't have enough power or determination to step outside of established political patterns. The current Government is incompetent and focuses far too much on dealing with the past. The economic team of the HDZ has no coordination, no leadership, no clear direction, nor the ability to addressing real causes of this protracted Croatian crisis."

Dalić resigned as a minister in the Cabinet of Andrej Plenković in May 2018.

On 3 February 2021, she took over the leadership of the Koprivnica-based company Podravka, one of the largest food companies in Southeast Europe.

== Other activities ==
- European Bank for Reconstruction and Development (EBRD), Ex-Officio Member of the Board of Governors (2010-2011)
