= Slaven Letica =

Croatian author and economist (1947–2020)

Slaven Letica (28 June 1947 – 25 October 2020) was a Croatian author, economist, commentator and politician.

== Biography ==
A native of Podgora, Letica graduated from the University of Zagreb Faculty of Economics in 1971. In the 1980s, Letica was a professor of sociology of medicine at the School of Medicine, University of Zagreb and a consultant for the World Health Organization, working on health service management projects in a number of countries in Europe, Asia and Africa.

In late 1980s, as the Communist grip on public discourse weakened, Letica began to use new freedoms to advocate various reforms. In doing so, he wrote many articles and columns and he began to appear in television talk shows and town hall meetings, quickly becoming one of the most popular and the most recognisable intellectuals in Yugoslavia.

In May 1990, after the first democratic elections, Franjo Tuđman made him his personal advisor. During negotiations which Tuđman pursued with the leader of the Serbs in Croatia, Jovan Rašković, Letica leaked the transcript of the secretly recorded conversation between Tuđman and Rašković to the Croatian media, hoping that some of Rašković's controversial remarks would give offense to his fellow Croatian Serbs and turn them away from his secessionist policies. As a consequence, however, the comparably moderate Rašković was replaced by Serb radicals, which hastened the start of the war in Croatia. Letica and Tuđman parted ways in March 1991 due to disagreement about Croatian politics towards Bosnia and Herzegovina.

In the following years Letica continued to appear in the Croatian media as a commentator, espousing opposition views, and became a regular columnist for Globus, a popular news magazine. During his time at Globus he gained significant notoriety due to an unsigned 1992 opinion piece (which he eventually admitted to have written), titled "Croatian Feminists are Raping Croatia", in which he attacked five Croatian feminist writers (Slavenka Drakulić, Vesna Kesić, Jelena Lovrić, Dubravka Ugrešić and Rada Iveković), accusing them of betraying Croatia. The article was a source of significant controversy which ultimately resulted in a successful defamation lawsuit against the magazine.

=== Political career ===
In the 2000 Croatian presidential election, Letica ran as an independent candidate. Although he finished fourth, the relatively high percentage of votes he won (4.14%) made him desirable to the Croatian Party of Rights (HSP), a right-wing party in desperate need to tone down its negative far-right image. Letica, with his reputation of a refined urbanite and European intellectual, served this purpose very well and on the 2003 Croatian parliamentary election, as a candidate on HSP's list, won a seat in the Sabor (Croatian Parliament).

He also associated at one point with the Croatian True Revival, a one-time political project of Miroslav Tuđman and Nenad Ivanković that failed to gain major traction in Croatian politics.

The HSP nevertheless used Letica again as their candidate in the 2005 Croatian presidential election. When Letica won fewer votes than in 2000, 2.59%, he accused the HSP of not supporting him enough. He quit the party midway through his term and remained in the Sabor until January 2008 as an independent.

In the 2007 Croatian parliamentary election, his independent list for the Zagreb region failed to gain the five percent of the vote needed to enter the Parliament.

=== Personal life ===
Letica was married to Gordana Cerjan-Letica, a sociologist and a professor at the School of Dental Medicine, University of Zagreb. They had two sons, Bartol (born in 1976) and Frane (born in 1982).

== Works ==
Selected books:

- Zdravstvo u Hrvatskoj: razvoj, stanje i perspektive (1981)
- Kriza i zdravstvo (1984)
- Zdravstvena politika u doba krize (1984)
- Intelektualac i kriza (1984)
- Četvrta Jugoslavija (1989)
- Obećana zemlja (1992)
- Divlje misli (1993)
- The Road from Paradise (1993, co-author)
- Habits of the Balkan Heart (1993, co-author)
- Postmoderna i genocid u Bosni i Hercegovini (1997, co-author)
- Političko pleme (1999)
- Strašni sud (2002)
- Medicinska sociologija (2003, co-author)

Sporting positions
Preceded by Suad Rizvanbegović	President of the Croatian Tennis Association; 2000–2002	Succeeded by Radimir Čačić
