= Croatian Tennis Association =

Tennis organization in Croatia

The Croatian Tennis Association (Croatian: Hrvatski teniski savez) is the governing body of tennis in Croatia. It organizes Croatia's teams in the Davis Cup and the Fed Cup. It also organizes and helps coordinate local tournaments and produces a national ranking list of players.

The CTA was formed in 1990. However, the first tennis association in Croatia dates back to 1912. It is a member of the International Tennis Federation. The association's president is Franjo Luković.

== Presidents ==
- Hrvoje Šarinić
- Stanko Bick
- Jurica Malčić
- Niko Bulić
- Suad Rizvanbegović (–2000)
- Slaven Letica (2000–2002)
- Radimir Čačić (2002–2011)
- Franjo Luković (2011–present)
