= Eugen Pusić =

Croatian jurist and university professor

- Born: 1 July 1916; Zagreb, Croatia-Slavonia, Austria-Hungary
- Died: 20 September 2010 (aged 94); Zagreb, Croatia
- Education: University of Zagreb
- Occupations: University professor; academician
- Children: 2, including Vesna

Eugen Pusić (1 July 1916 – 20 September 2010) was a Croatian jurist, university professor and academician specialized in social affairs and welfare.

== Career ==
Pusić was born in Zagreb, where he studied at the Faculty of Law of the University of Zagreb, receiving his doctorate in 1939. From November 1939 to August 1940 he served in the Royal Yugoslav Army.

== During the WWII ==
From April 1941 to May 1945 he served as a captain-judge in the Croatian Home Guard and was rewarded the War Memorial Sign in 1944. As is evident from the state archives documents he worked for the institutions of the Nazi-puppet state, so called Independent State of Croatia (NDH). However, according to some unconfirmed statements he also was a mole for resistance movement led by the Yugoslav Partisans throughout the war. His daughter Vesna Pusić also claimed that her father was an associate of Partisans. When the Partisans liberated Zagreb on 8 May 1945 Pusić was arrested with many other NDH officials, who failed to escape the town, on suspicion of collaboration with occupiers (Nazis and Ustaše). He was later saved from prison by the partisan general Ivan Rukavina who was commander of the First Corps of the Yugoslav Partisans from 1943. The fact that he was saved immediately after the liberation of Zagreb and that after the war he worked on high positions in the SFR Yugoslavia certainly suggest that it has something to do with his collaboration with the partisans during the war.

== After the WWII ==
From 1955 to the mid-1960s, Pusić was a lecturer and extraordinary professor in Zagreb Faculty of Law, as well as actively involved in the Yugoslav Academy of Sciences and Arts, holding posts such as the director of the Juraj Križanić Cabinet of Legal, Political and Social Sciences as well as secretary and member of the Presidency. In addition, Pusić was corresponding member of both, Slovenian and Montenegrin Academy of Sciences and Arts.

Outside Croatia Pusić also lectured at the University of Manchester (1963), University of California, Berkeley (1969), University of Pennsylvania (1972) and was a fellow at the Institute of Social Studies and the Center for Advanced Study in the Behavioral Sciences at Stanford.

Pusić served as an expert at the United Nations on several occasions, providing advice on social affairs and welfare. Pusić won many awards for his contributions to the disciplines of social policy and organizational behavior. The Institute of Social Studies (ISS) in The Hague awarded its honorary doctorate to Eugen Pusić in 1962.

He has daughter Vesna who is a sociologist and politician and son Zoran who is a civil rights and peace activist.

== Works ==
Books

- Administration and Society (Co-Authors S. Ivanisevic, J. Kregar, Par. Pavic, I. Perko-Separovic, S. Petkovic, M. Ramljak, I. Šimonović) Zagreb, the Institute for Social Research, University of Zagreb, 1986, 399 pages.
- Order and Randomness in Cooperative Systems, Pittsburgh, International Studies Association, 1977, 200 pages.
- Social Welfare and Social Development, The Hague-Paris, Mouton, 1972, 251 pages
- Participation and the multidimensional development of complexity / Eugen Pusic / Vienna, Vienna Institute for Development, 1972. - 30 pages.
- Social welfare and social development / by Eugen Pusic / The Hague etc.: Mouton; ISS, 1972. - 251 pages.
- Planning the social services in developing countries: process and structures / Eugen Pusic / The Hague: Mouton; Institute of Social Studies (ISS), 1965. - 30 pages.
- Social welfare policy: first collection: contributions to theory / ed. by J.A. Ponsioen / 's-Gravenhage: Mouton, 1962. - 287 pages.
- Urban government for Zagreb, Yugoslavia / Eugen Pusic and Annmarie Hauck Walsh / New York: Praeger.

Articles

- The relationship of economic organizations and community-to manual for members of management bodies of the workers, Labor, Belgrade, 1958, pp. 36–71.
- Development and the present state administration study, Archives of legal and social science, 44/1957, no. 1, pp. I40-153. 3I.
- Citizens Management in the Social Services in Yugoslavia, Nordisk Administrativ Tidsskrift, 1957, pp. 132–145.
- Some problems of construction personnel in our public administration, the Bulletin of the organization administration, Zagreb, 1957, no. 11, pp. 437–446.
- The development of social management in FNRJ, the Institute for the social management, Zagreb, 1957.
- The Framework of Social Welfare Research - in: The Relation between Research, Planning and Social Welfare Policy, Geneva, 1957, pp. 77–85.
- The FPR Yugoslavia and her Social Services, Malaiskunta, Helsinki, 1956, no. 2, pp. 44–46.
- Social work and social workers, our reality, 10/1956, no. 3, pp. 312–317.
- Subject, goals and tasks of administrative science, our legality, 10/1956, no. 3, pp. 97–103.
- Centralization and decentralization, the new administration, 4 / 1956, no. 3, pp. 290–301.
- Some theories about centralization and decentralization, Proceedings of the Law Faculty in Zagreb, 6 / 1956, no. 1–2, pp. 34–43.
- Industrialisation and social work, Social Policy, 6 / 1956, no. 9, pp. 32–37.
- Differences in Attitude of Public Administration, Bestuurswetenschappen, September 1956, no. 5, pp. 319–343.
- Families and social services, our reality, 10/1956, no. 11–12, pp. 480–488
- Some Problems of Procedure in Public Administration, the Institute of Social Studies, 1955, pp. 1–43.
- Local administrations in Finland, our legality, 9 / 1955, no. 3, pp. 117–121. Social Welfare in Finland, Social Policy, 5 / 1955, no. 5, pp. 76–80.
- Organization of administration, our legality, 8 / 1954, no. 1, pp. 1–8.
- Social Work - A Branch of Administration or a Method of Work - in: New Trends in European Social Work, Vienna, 1954, pp. 79–86.
- Functions of social workers, Social Policy, 4 / 1954, no. 11–12, pp. 52–57.
- The Development of Social Services in FPR Yugoslavia, the UN, Social Division, Geneva, MTAA / 40 / 1954, 20 pp.
- Training of social workers in FNRJ, Social Policy, 3 / 1953, no. 5, pp. 33–35.
- State corporations in the U.S. administration, Views, 1953, no. 7, pp. 491–497.
- Realism in our administration, the Croatian round, 5 / 1982, no. 1, pp. 15–17.
- Social worker as a profession, Social Policy, 2 / 1952, no. 10, pp. 573–578.
- Age and family insurance in the United States, Social policy, 1 / 1951, no. 7, pp. 263–258.
- Child protection in the United States, Social policy, l J 1951, no. 8–9, pp. 324–327.
- Scraps of American local government, the National States, 1951, no. 6–7, pp. 52–55, no. 8, pp. 35–45.
- Subject doctrines of administration, the National States, 1951, no. 11–12, pp. 83–89.
- Social care in the United States, Social care, 3 / 1950, no. 10–11, pp. 400–405.

== Sources ==
- Umro akademik Eugen Pusić, otac Vesne Pusić (in Croatian)
