= Damir Habijan =

Croatian politician (born 1982)

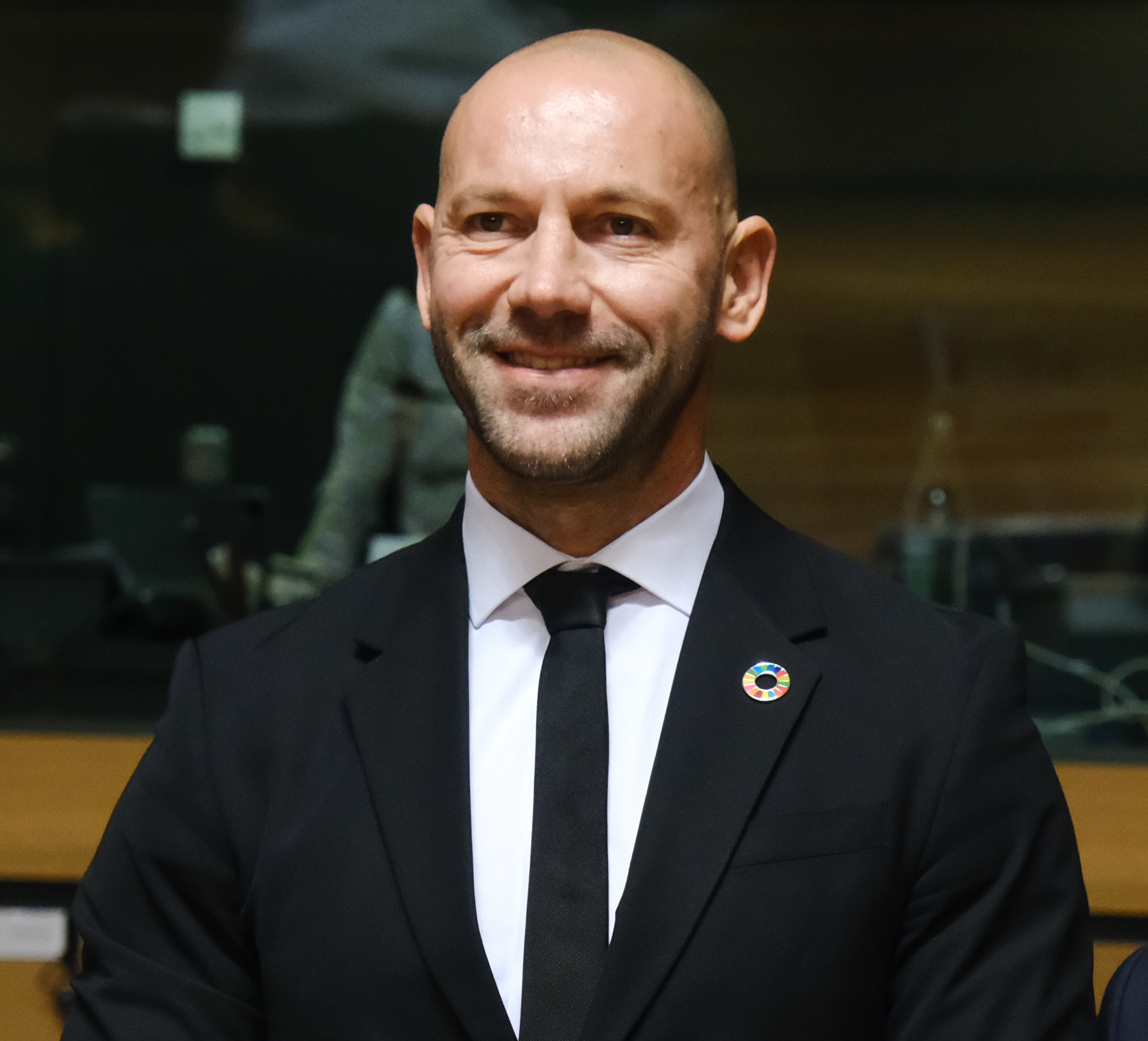
- Habijan in 2024

Minister of Justice, Public Administration and Digital Transformation
- Incumbent
- Assumed office 17 May 2024
- Prime Minister: Andrej Plenković
- Preceded by: Ivan Malenica

Minister of Economy
- In office 15 December 2023 – 17 May 2024
- Prime Minister: Andrej Plenković
- Preceded by: Davor Filipović
- Succeeded by: Ante Šušnjar

Personal details
- Born: 4 January 1982 (age 44) Varaždin, SR Croatia, SFR Yugoslavia (modern Croatia)
- Party: Croatian Democratic Union
- Education: Faculty of Law, University of Zagreb

Damir Habijan (born 4 January 1982) is a Croatian politician of the Croatian Democratic Union serving as minister of justice since 2024. From 2023 to 2024, he served as minister of economy. From 2020 to 2023, he was a member of the Croatian Parliament.
