= Predrag Štromar =

Croatian politician (born 1969)

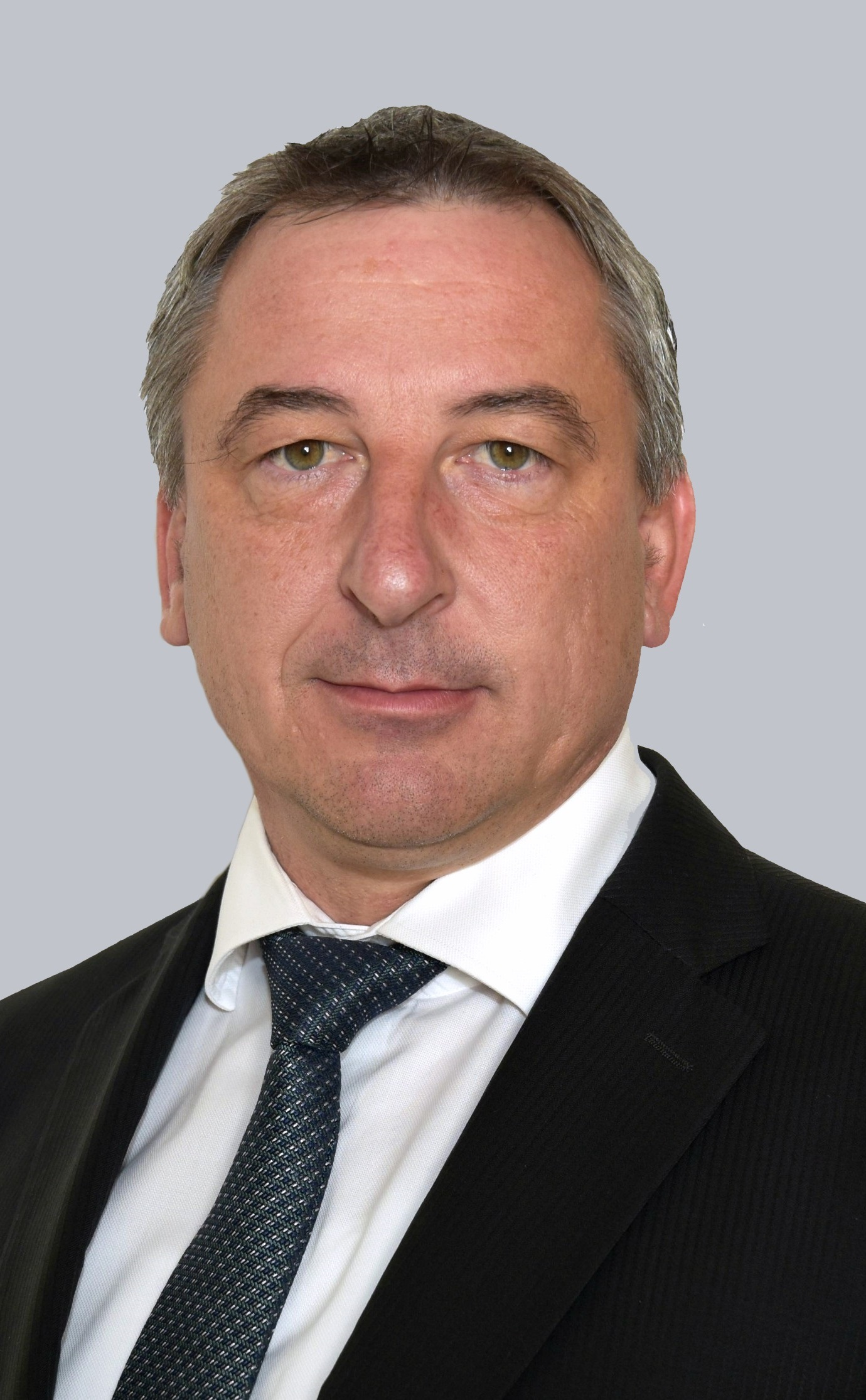

President of the Croatian People's Party
- In office 24 May 2020 – 12 December 2020
- Preceded by: Ivan Vrdoljak
- Succeeded by: Stjepan Čuraj
- In office 6 June 2017 – 17 December 2017; Acting
- Preceded by: Ivan Vrdoljak
- Succeeded by: Ivan Vrdoljak

Deputy Prime Minister of Croatia
- In office 9 June 2017 – 23 July 2020
- Prime Minister: Andrej Plenković
- Preceded by: Ivan Kovačić
- Succeeded by: Boris Milošević

Minister of Construction and Physical Planning
- In office 9 June 2017 – 23 July 2020
- Prime Minister: Andrej Plenković
- Preceded by: Lovro Kuščević
- Succeeded by: Darko Horvat

Prefect of the Varaždin County
- In office May 2009 – 9 June 2017
- Preceded by: Zvonimir Sabati
- Succeeded by: Radimir Čačić

Personal details
- Born: 13 January 1969 (age 57) Vinica, SR Croatia, SFR Yugoslavia
- Party: Croatian People's Party (1990–present)
- Education: University of Zagreb

Predrag Štromar (pronounced [prêdraːɡ štrȏmar]; born 13 January 1969) is a Croatian politician who served as Minister of Construction and Physical Planning and Deputy Prime Minister in the Government of Croatia from 2017 to 2020. He previously served as president of the Croatian People's Party from May to December 2020.

== Early life ==
Born in Vinica, Štromar attended secondary school in Varaždin. He graduated at the Zagreb Faculty of Economics and Business in 1993.

== Political career ==
As a Croatian People's Party – Liberal Democrats candidate, Štromar was elected as prefect of Varaždin County in the 2009 election. In the 2013 election, Štromar was re-elected, while following the 2017 election, Radimir Čačić succeeded him as prefect. From 2016 to 2017, Štromar served as deputy president of the HNS, while between June and December 2017, he served as acting party president.

On 9 June 2017, Štromar was appointed as Minister of Construction and Spatial Planning and Deputy Prime Minister in the cabinet of prime minister Andrej Plenković. On 24 May 2020, Štromar was elected as president of the HNS.

== Personal life ==
Born in the village of Vinica based in Varaždin County, Štromar is married with two daughters. Apart from his native Croatian, he is fluent in English.

== See also ==
- Cabinet of Andrej Plenković
