= Gordan Maras =

Croatian economist and politician

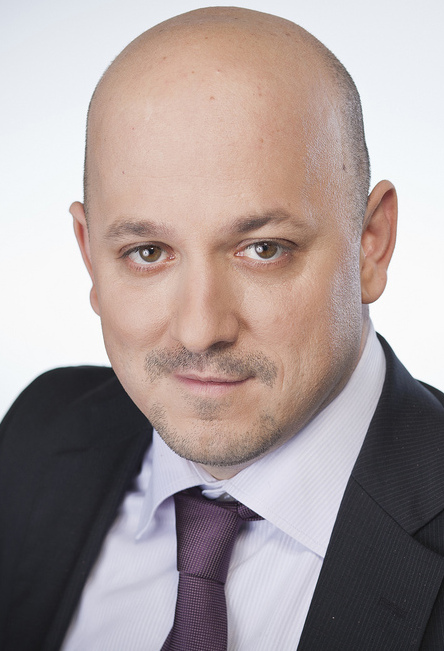

Minister of Entrepreneurship and Crafts
- In office 23 December 2011 – 22 January 2016
- Prime Minister: Zoran Milanović
- Preceded by: Đuro Popijač
- Succeeded by: Darko Horvat

Personal details
- Born: 13 June 1974 (age 52) Zagreb, SR Croatia, SFR Yugoslavia
- Party: Independent (2021–present)
- Other political affiliations: Social Democratic Party (1997–2021)
- Children: 2
- Education: University of Zagreb (Faculty of Economics)
- Occupation: Economist

Gordan Maras (born 13 June 1974) is a Croatian economist and politician who served as a minister at Ministry of Entrepreneurship and Crafts at the Cabinet of Zoran Milanović from 2011 until 2016. He was a member of the centre-left Social Democratic Party (SDP).

== Education ==
Maras finished elementary school "Vladimir Nemet" and 10th Gymnasium. He graduated from the University of Zagreb Faculty of Economics and gained his master's degree at the Cotrugli Business School.

== Professional career ==
From 2001 to 2003 he was a sales and business manager at Croatian Olympic Centre Bjelolasica, from 2003 to 2004 CEO of Maximus Communications, and from 2004 to 2010 business manager of Social Democratic Party of Croatia.

== Political career ==
Maras started his political career in 1997 when he joined the Social Democratic Party. He was a vice-president of the SDP Youth Forum (1998–2000), President of the SDP Youth Forum (2000–2002), and member of SDP Main Board (2000–2008). In 2009, he became the vice-president of SDP of the City of Zagreb and, since 17 June 2018, he is the president of SDP of the City of Zagreb.

In the 2007 parliamentary elections, Maras was elected to Sabor in 1st electoral district. In 2008, he became the vice-president of the Committee on Finance and State Budget of Sabor. From 2011 to 2016, he was the Minister of Entrepreneurship and Crafts at the Cabinet of Zoran Milanović.

In addition to his committee assignments, Maras has also been serving as member of the Croatian delegation to the Parliamentary Assembly of the Council of Europe since 2017. As member of the Socialist Group, he is currently a member of the Sub-Committee on Education, Youth and Sport and of the Sub-Committee on Media and Information Society. He was part of a cross-party delegation to observe the 2017 parliamentary elections in Bulgaria.

On 27 July 2021, Maras was evicted from SDP, alongside Rajko Ostojić, Marina Opačak Bilić, Nikša Vukas, Tihomir Barišić and Zvane Brumnić.

== Personal life ==
Maras is a father of two–Ema and Borna. He lives in Zagreb and in spare time likes to play tennis and football. He is fluent in English.
