= Ministry of State Property (Croatia) =

Ministry in the Government of Croatia

- Ministarstvo državne imovine
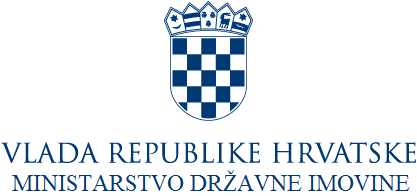

Agency overview
- Formed: 15 November 2016
- Superseding agency: Ministry of Construction, Spatial Planning and State Property
- Jurisdiction: Government of Croatia
- Headquarters: Dežmanova 10, Zagreb
- Employees: 173 (July 2019)
- Agency executives: Tomislav Boban, State Secretary; Krunoslav Katičić, State Secretary
- Website: imovina.gov.hr

The Ministry of State Property of the Republic of Croatia (Croatian: Ministarstvo državne imovine Republike Hrvatske) was the ministry in the government of Croatia responsible for state property management. It is now defunct as it was merged with the Ministry of Construction, Spatial Planning and State Property.

== List of ministers ==
#	Minister	Party	Term start	Term end	Days in office
1	Goran Marić	HDZ	15 November 2016	15 July 2019	972
2	Mario Banožić	HDZ	22 July 2019	23 July 2020	367

=== Ministers of Privatisation and Property Management (1995–1999) ===
#	Minister	Party	Term start	Term end	Days in office
1	Ivan Penić	HDZ	27 January 1995	16 December 1996	689
2	Milan Kovač	HDZ	16 December 1996	1 April 1999	836
