= Boris Buzančić =

Croatian actor and politician

Mayor of Zagreb
- In office 1990–1993
- Preceded by: Mato Mikić
- Succeeded by: Branko Mikša

Personal details
- Born: 13 March 1929 Bjelovar, Kingdom of Serbs, Croats and Slovenes
- Died: 9 October 2014 (aged 85) Zagreb, Croatia
- Party: Croatian Democratic Union
- Spouse: Katja Buzančić (m. 1957)
- Children: 2
- Education: Zagreb Academy of Dramatic Art
- Occupation: Actor; politician
- Awards: Order of Danica Hrvatska

Boris Buzančić (13 March 1929 – 9 October 2014) was a Croatian actor and politician who served as the 47th Mayor of Zagreb between 1990 and 1993.

A native of Bjelovar, Buzančić began acting very early. He appeared in numerous films and TV shows. His specialty was playing roles of men with authority, especially in dramatic films dealing with World War II. However, one of his most memorable roles is witty Split mayor Dotur Vice in popular TV series Velo misto.

By a twist of fate, Buzančić became a mayor in real life in 1990, following the first multi-party elections in Croatia, during which he supported Croatian Democratic Union. He was elected for the mayor of Zagreb and held that post for two years, until being elected to the Croatian Parliament in 1992 (Second assembly of the Croatian Parliament).

After 1995 he returned to acting. Two of his roles — in 1999 comedy Marshal Tito's Spirit (Maršal) and 2002 TV series Promised Land (Obećana zemlja) - were inspired by real-life characters of Tito and Tuđman. He died at the age of 85 after a long illness on 9 October 2014. He and Ana Karić died on 9 October 2014.

Preceded by Mato Mikić	Mayor of Zagreb; 1990–1993	Succeeded by Branko Mikša
