= Đuro Popijač =

Croatian politician (born 1959)

Minister of Entrepreneurship and Crafts
- Succeeded by: Gordan Maras

Personal details
- Born: 23 April 1959 (age 66) Zagreb, PR Croatia, FPR Yugoslavia (modern Croatia)
- Party: Croatian Democratic Union
- Occupation: Politician

Đuro Popijač (born 23 April 1959) is a member of the 7th Croatian Parliament and an Ex-Minister.

He was named the Chairman of the Board of Petrokemija, a company for the production of artificial fertilizers in February 2017.

== Education ==
He graduated from the Engineering College in Maribor and obtained his degree of Master of Science in Economics from the Faculty of Economics in Zagreb.

== Political party ==
Croatian Democratic Union

== Position ==
Deputy Club of the Croatian Democratic Union

== Parliamentary tenure ==
- Member of Parliament term of office started on 22 December 2011
- Member of Parliament term of office ended on 23 December 2015
