= You Know Me movement =

Social movement

The You Know Me movement is a 2019 movement by abortion rights advocates in the United States to fight abortion stigma. A similar campaign and movement from 2015 is called #ShoutYourAbortion.

The You Know Me movement is a response to the successful 2019 passage of six-week abortion bans in five U.S. states, most notably the passing of anti-abortion laws in Georgia (House Bill 381), Ohio (House Bill 68), and Alabama (House Bill 314).

== Background and origin ==
=== 1970–2014 ===
While 2015 is acknowledged as the start of #ShoutYourAbortion and 2019 as the start of #YouKnowMe, the efforts of Sue Perlgut and other second-wave feminists who suggested that women disclose their abortions publicly provides historic precedent from the 1970s.

In 1971 in France, 343 filmmakers, writers, actresses, singers and philosophers confessed their illegal abortions publicly, in order to demand freedom to have an abortion, in the 'Manifesto of the 343', published by the magazine Nouvel Observateur.

In 1973, the manifesto was the inspiration for a 1973 manifesto by 331 doctors declaring their support for abortion rights.

Within less than four years of the manifesto's publication, the French Health Minister Simone Veil presented a law on 26 November 1974 to the National Assembly that would legalize abortion. France legalized abortion in Law 75-17 of 18 January 1975, which permitted a woman to receive an abortion on request until the tenth week of pregnancy. After a trial period, Law 75-17 was adopted permanently in December 1979.

Since 1990, Whoopi Goldberg (1991), Lil' Kim (2000), Sharon Osbourne (2004), Joan Collins (2010), Chelsea Handler (2012), Sherri Shepherd (2012), Nicki Minaj (2014), and Gloria Steinem (2015) are some notable women in the public eye who discussed their abortions in order to help end stigma.

=== 2015: #ShoutYourAbortion ===
In the wake of the House of Representatives' vote to defund Planned Parenthood, Lindy West, Amelia Bonow and Kimberly Morrison launched #ShoutYourAbortion to "remind supporters and critics alike abortion is a legal right to anyone who wants or needs it". The women encouraged other women to share positive abortion experiences online using the hashtag #ShoutYourAbortion in order to "denounce the stigma surrounding abortion".

=== 2019 build-up to the You Know Me movement ===
On 18 February 2019, the singer Amanda Palmer released a single about abortion, "Voicemail for Jill", on YouTube. Palmer had previously spoken out about her abortions in 2015.

On 1 March 2019, the artist and activist Rose McGowan spoke out about her abortion and asked for a public debate about abortion using the hashtag #HonestAbortion, in a reply to a tweet that stated, "1 in 4 women has an abortion by age 45. 60% are already mothers."

On 7 May 2019, the actress Busy Philipps spoke about her own abortion in her talkshow Busy Tonight:

"The statistic is 1 in 4 women will have an abortion before age 45, and that statistic sometimes surprises people, and maybe you're sitting there thinking: I don't know a woman who had an abortion. Well, you know me. I had an abortion when I was fifteen years old."

=== #YouKnowMe ===
On 15 May 2019, the actress Busy Philipps encouraged women on Twitter to share their abortion stories, in the wake of the proposed Alabama abortion ban. Phillips said she was encouraged to share the hashtag by Tina Fey, as it "makes it very personal". As a result of Philipps' tweet, women both in the United States as well as outside, replied with their abortion stories, many of them using the hashtag #youknowme on social media. Within 24 hours, nearly 50,000 people had liked or shared Philipps' tweet, and almost 2,000 users had replied to it.

Notably, the actresses Jameela Jamil, Rosanna Arquette and Ashley Judd used the #youknowme hashtag. Women in the public eye who shared abortion stories after Philipps' tweet include the activist Nelini Stamp and the actresses Cynthia Nixon, Keke Palmer, and Rosanna Arquette.

On Tuesday, 22 May 2019, thousands of people across the US marched in abortion rights '#StopTheBans' protests against the 2019 wave of anti-abortion legislation in some states in America. Several politicians, including Pete Buttigieg, Amy Klobuchar, Kirsten Gillibrand and Cory Booker, participated in these demonstrations. California Rep. Jackie Speier spoke about her abortion at a protest in Washington DC, while referring to the You Know Me movement's phrase:

You know me, I am one of the 1 in 4 women who has had an abortion in this country. ... I am not ashamed.

On May 23, 2019, the American Civil Liberties Union launched an advertising campaign narrated by Busy Philipps, which featured the #YouKnowMe hashtag and encouraged people to speak out against abortion bans.

On June 4, 2019, Busy Philipps testified before the United States Congress in support of abortion rights and against abortion restrictions.

== International response ==
"You Know Me" has been identified and referred to as a viral social media campaign and movement. The movement has gained international media coverage outside the US, for instance in Germany, Italy, France, The Netherlands and South Korea.

Lisa Bouyeure, a columnist for the Dutch newspaper De Volkskrant, wrote about the May 2019 Alabama abortion ban in her column and how the events reminded her of the TV show The Handmaid's Tale. She noted that #YouKnowMe is "a start, such a warm wave of solidarity in an ice-cold conservative climate, but let's hope that it will really change something. You grant every baby to be born at a time when The Handmaid's Tale is fiction again."

Mare Hotterbeekx, a journalist for the Belgium magazine Knack's weekend edition, stated that the hashtag #YouKnowMe causing women to massively share their abortion stories was "an openness that Belgian women can only dream of".

Kathy Michaels, a journalist for InfoTel Canada, started her opinion article on the #YouKnowMe movement with the question "Have you had an abortion?". She continued stating "don't say because I don't care and neither should anyone else. #YouKnowMe movement or not, it's no more anyone's business if you terminated a pregnancy than it is if your significant other has a low sperm count or if you're having a series of particularly unpleasant periods that require a visit to your GP." Michaels remarked further that people in her social network had started posting articles from the US "lamenting the backward momentum south of the border and expressing fear that a cultural black hole is going to suck us all in". She finished with the statement, "The good news is that this is happening in an election year so those of you who care can start doing the work needed to ensure your needs and interests are best represented when and if the time comes to raise this issue again. Until then, #YouDontNeedToKnowMe. We're Canadian and that means something when it comes to bodily autonomy."

Kari Postma and Robin Smeets of Dance4Life addressed the #YouKnowMe hashtag in an opinion article in Dutch newspaper Trouw. Postma and Smeets voiced their concerns about the 2019 anti-abortion movements in America, remarking that "the growth of the anti-abortion lobby ensures that girls and women who terminate a pregnancy are stigmatized and hardly talk about it" which they considered "a worrying development". They wrote that abortion is an "important acquired right in the Netherlands" and given that "the right to abortion is under international fire", people in the Netherlands should make a "clear pro-choice sound in the Netherlands". Postma and Smeets stated that safe environments for women should be created so they "dare to tell about their decision, whether or not via #YouKnowMe" and that "It is up to all of us not to condemn but to respect women who exercise their freedom of choice".

Vanja Deželić, a journalist for Vijesti.hr, compared the #YouKnowMe movement to the Croatian #Spasime movement (transl. #SaveMe), which started in March 2019 and aims to collect testimonies about domestic abuse and to fight domestic violence in Croatia. Deželić wrote that anti-abortion movements had become more active in Croatia and were aiming for similar law changes such as the 2019 six-week abortion ban that passed in Alabama. Deželić stated that resistance against these anti-abortion movements could happen in Croatia based on the #YouKnowMe movement and thanks to Busy Philipps.

== Criticism ==
Arwa Mahdawi, a columnist for The Guardian, wrote that "while #YouKnowMe is powerful, it's also profoundly depressing" and that women should not have to tell abortion stories to remind lawmakers that they are human.

Meghan Flaherty, a writer for The Seattle Times, wrote that she felt "deeply humbled and heartened" by the #YouKnowMe stories she read, but also noted many women used the hashtag to explain their reasons for abortion, which she found "problematic". Flaherty wrote that "personal reproductive health decision-making power and the tools to implement those decisions are fundamental human rights. No woman or man should have to justify the decisions they make about their own body and parenthood."

Madeline Fry, a commentary writer for The Washington Examiner, argued that the "heartbreaking" stories within the #YouKnowMe hashtag "didn't justify the pro-abortion cause", remarking however that the movement was "less shameless" than "#ShoutYourAbortion, the repulsive no-regrets movement".

== See also ==
- Abortion in the United States by state
- Hashtag activism
- Me Too movement
- Rape
- List of songs about abortion
- Manifesto of the 343
- Spasime movement
- Ele Não movement
