= ShoutYourAbortion =

Pro-abortion social media campaign

www.shoutyourabortion.com

#ShoutYourAbortion is a pro-abortion social media campaign where people share their abortion experiences online without "sadness, shame or regret" for the purpose of "destigmatization, normalization, and putting an end to shame." Tens of thousands of people worldwide have shared their abortion experiences online using the hashtag #ShoutYourAbortion. The Shout Your Abortion campaign was started on September 19, 2015, by American activists Lindy West, Amelia Bonow, and Kimberly Morrison, in response to efforts by the United States House of Representatives to defund Planned Parenthood following a 2015 undercover videos controversy. The hashtag has received both positive and negative attention within social media and the mainstream media.

== Background and origin ==
On September 18, 2015, the U.S. House of Representatives passed legislation to suspend funding of Planned Parenthood Federation of America for one year, pending investigation of allegations regarding Planned Parenthood's practices with respect to fetal organ and tissue donation. Shout Your Abortion co-founder Amelia Bonow reported she "cried all day" in response to the House of Representatives attempts to defund Planned Parenthood.

On September 19, 2015, Bonow turned to social media, speaking out in defense of Planned Parenthood on her Facebook page. Bonow expressed gratitude for what she described as an "incredibly positive experience" of an abortion procedure she had at a Planned Parenthood facility and Bonow publicly discussed her abortion without "sadness, shame or regret". Two other activists, Lindy West and Kimberly Morrison, became involved. West took a screen shot of Bonow's Facebook post, added the hashtag #ShoutYourAbortion, and then sent Bonow's Facebook post out to her over 60,000 Twitter followers with the introduction: "The campaign to defund PP relies on the assumption that abortion is something to be whispered about." An image of Kimberly Morrison's unshaved armpit with a tattoo that reads "fuck the patriarchy" was used as the logo for the Shout Your Abortion social media campaign. The hashtag #ShoutYourAbortion soon trended worldwide, including in the US, Australia, UK, and Ireland. On September 22, 2015, the #ShoutYourAbortion hashtag was used over 100,000 times in a 24-hour period.

While 2015 is acknowledged as the start of #ShoutYourAbortion as a social media campaign, the efforts of Sue Perlgut and other second-wave feminists who suggested that women confess their abortions publicly provides historic precedent from the 1970s.

== Support for abortion rights ==
Lindy West, Amelia Bonow, and Kimberly Morrison encouraged other women to share positive abortion experiences online using the hashtag #ShoutYourAbortion in order to "denounce the stigma surrounding abortion."

On September 19, 2015, West tweeted: "My abortion was in '10 & the career I've built since then fulfills me & makes me better able to care for kids I have now #ShoutYourAbortion." West said, "I set up #ShoutYourAbortion because I am not sorry and I will not whisper." Within days, tens of thousands of other women worldwide shared their personal abortion experiences. Tweets included: "I've never wanted to have children, so I had an abortion. I'm thriving, without guilt, without shame, without apologies. #ShoutYourAbortion"; "I've had 2 abortions. I don't have to justify or explain them to anybody. My life is more valuable than a potential life. #shoutyourabortion"; "In 1988 a late-term abortion got a teenage me back on track for college, career, & motherhood. #ShoutYourAbortion"; "My abortion was the most compassionate option for the baby and me. #ShoutYourAbortion", and "I had an abortion. My body, my life, my choice. End of story. #shoutyourabortion." Planned Parenthood's executive vice present, Dawn Laguens, publicly supported the Shout Your Abortion social media campaign saying: "We're happy to see more and more people coming forward...these stories are a powerful reminder that women should never feel shamed or judged."

In an interview with The New Yorker, Bonow expressed that perhaps she and her friends, whom Bonow described as "irreverent, foul-mouthed ladies" were better able than those currently inside the traditional abortion-rights organizations to talk frankly about their positive experiences with abortion. Within days of the launch of the social media campaign, Bonow was contacted by NARAL Pro-Choice America and Planned Parenthood with advice for harnessing the current outpouring of attention in order to turn Shout Your Abortion into something bigger and more organized. In November 2015, an official Shout Your Abortion web site and YouTube channel were launched.

== Criticism and backlash ==
In addition to positive abortion stories and support for the abortion-rights movement, the social media campaign received backlash and criticism as anti-abortion activists also began using the hashtag #ShoutYourAbortion to combat these beliefs. CNN reported: "it should surprise no one that this has turned into a bit of a fight." Anti-abortion activist Gianna Jessen tweeted: "My medical records: 'Born during saline abortion.' I didn't have an abortion. I Lived through one. #shoutyourabortion." Conservative blogger Michelle Malkin urged her Twitter followers to "Shout this LOUDER: #PPSellsBabyParts." Former Republican member of the House of Representatives, and 2012 presidential candidate Michele Bachmann said, "#ShoutYourAbortion gives a new meaning to macabre." Other critical tweets included: "When did making someone else pay dearly for your mistakes become empowerment for women? #shoutyourabortion"; "All of humanity past and present looks upon what has become of modern feminism and shakes its head in disgust & disbelief #shoutyourabortion"; and "All great genocides start by dehumanizing the victim. #ShoutYourAbortion."

Other Tweets included: "I am pro choice. However, abortion is a difficult decision and not something to 'shout' about."; "Ladies there are so many wonderful ways to celebrate being a strong independent & intelligent woman, #ShoutYourAbortion is not one of them."; and "Regardless of your stance on abortion, why can't we all agree it's not something to brag about?"

On Twitter, the hashtag #ShoutYourAdoption was created in response to #ShoutYourAbortion, to promote adoption instead of abortion.

In response to online criticism, actress Martha Plimpton, co-founder of the abortion rights organization "A is for" created a "Mean Tweets" style video along with comedian Margaret Cho and other prominent contributors to the Shout Your Abortion social media campaign. The video shows the women "laughing off the trolls" on Twitter. Critical tweets included: threats, references to racism, and calling the women "baby killers".

== Media attention ==
Media responses to the Shout Your Abortion social media campaign were mixed. Mic.com, a media company focused on millennials described Shout Your Abortion as Twitter users "bravely fighting stigma in the most inspiring way".

Writing for The Guardian, Shout Your Abortion co-founder Lindy West said, "there are no 'good' abortions and 'bad' abortions, because an abortion is just a medical procedure" and "a foetus is not a person." Ian O'Doherty writing for The Irish Independent commented on the social media campaign saying abortion is "not really something to shout about" describing abortion as "the only medical procedure which deliberately ends a life", saying it can at best be described as "a necessary evil". O'Doherty said "abortion should be legal, safe and rare" concluding "it's not an act of patriarchial misogyny to say that."

Writing for The Seattle Times, Nicole Brodeur commented that "If abortion is a political football, #ShoutYourAbortion is a Hail Mary pass – women publicizing an extremely personal decision in order to save what they believe is every woman's right." Writing for Jezebel, Shout Your Abortion co-founder Amelia Bonow summarized the social media campaign by saying: "they can't figure out how to shut us up" furthering, "there are too goddamned many of us and you cannot reverse a viral shift in cultural consciousness. " Co-founder Lindy West said that getting the discussion out in public is the whole point of the social media campaign, saying: "you never have to feel ashamed of your personal medical decisions," "You can speak about them at full volume."

Shout Your Abortion was described as marking a significant tonal shift in the cultural conversation about abortion in The Washington Post, by Caitlin Gibson. She described Shout Your Abortion as a shift away from describing abortion as a less-than-desirable outcome and a distancing from Hillary Clinton's frequently-quoted 2008 remark that abortion should be "safe, legal and rare", saying the campaign moves the discussion away from extreme cases involving rape, incest, medical emergencies or severe birth defects.

== Book ==
Shout Your Abortion (2018, PM Press): Amelia Bonow (Editor), Emily Nokes (Editor), Lindy West (Foreword).

The book is a compilation of photos, stories, interviews with abortion providers, and examples of the artwork created through the movement. The stories come from all over the country to provide a comprehensive lens into what it's like to get an abortion in the US.

== 2019: #YouKnowMe ==
The You Know Me Movement is a similar 2019 internet movement against abortion stigma and a response to the Fetal heartbeat bill in the United States, specifically the passing of anti-abortion laws in 2019 in Georgia (U.S. state), Ohio and Alabama.

== See also ==
- Hashtag activism
- Me Too movement
- Rape
- You Know Me movement
