= You Know Me =

You Know Me may refer to:

- You Know Me, a 2000 album by Jackie DeShannon
- "You Know Me" (2 Pistols song), a 2008 single by 2 Pistols featuring Ray J
- "You Know Me" (Robbie Williams song), a 2009 single by Robbie Williams
- You Know Me Movement
