= Spasime movement =

2019 Croatian social movement

The #Spasime movement (translated as #SaveMe movement) is a 2019 Croatian social movement which fights domestic violence, and is an example of the MeToo effect.

== Background and origin ==
The #Spasime movement was launched on Facebook in March 2019, and in 2 weeks gathered more than 46,000 supporters online. The movement has been supported by many Croatian celebrities, among others actress and screenwriter Jelena Veljača, who was one of the main organisers behind the protests that followed, organised by the movement. Veljača said she started the #Spasime hashtag "driven by the incredible wave of violence spreading across Croatia" and that she had been especially shocked by the news about a father from Pag who threw his children off a balcony.

Vanja Deželić, a journalist for the Croatian news site Vijesti.hr, compared the #Spasime movement to the You Know Me movement which started two months after the #Spasime movement, in May 2019, and is a movement by abortion rights advocates to fight abortion stigma. Deželić wrote that anti-abortion movements had become more active in Croatia and were aiming for similar law changes such as the 2019 Heartbeat bill that passed in Alabama. Deželić stated that resistance against these anti-abortion movements could happen in Croatia based on the #YouKnowMe movement and thanks to Busy Philipps.

== Protests ==
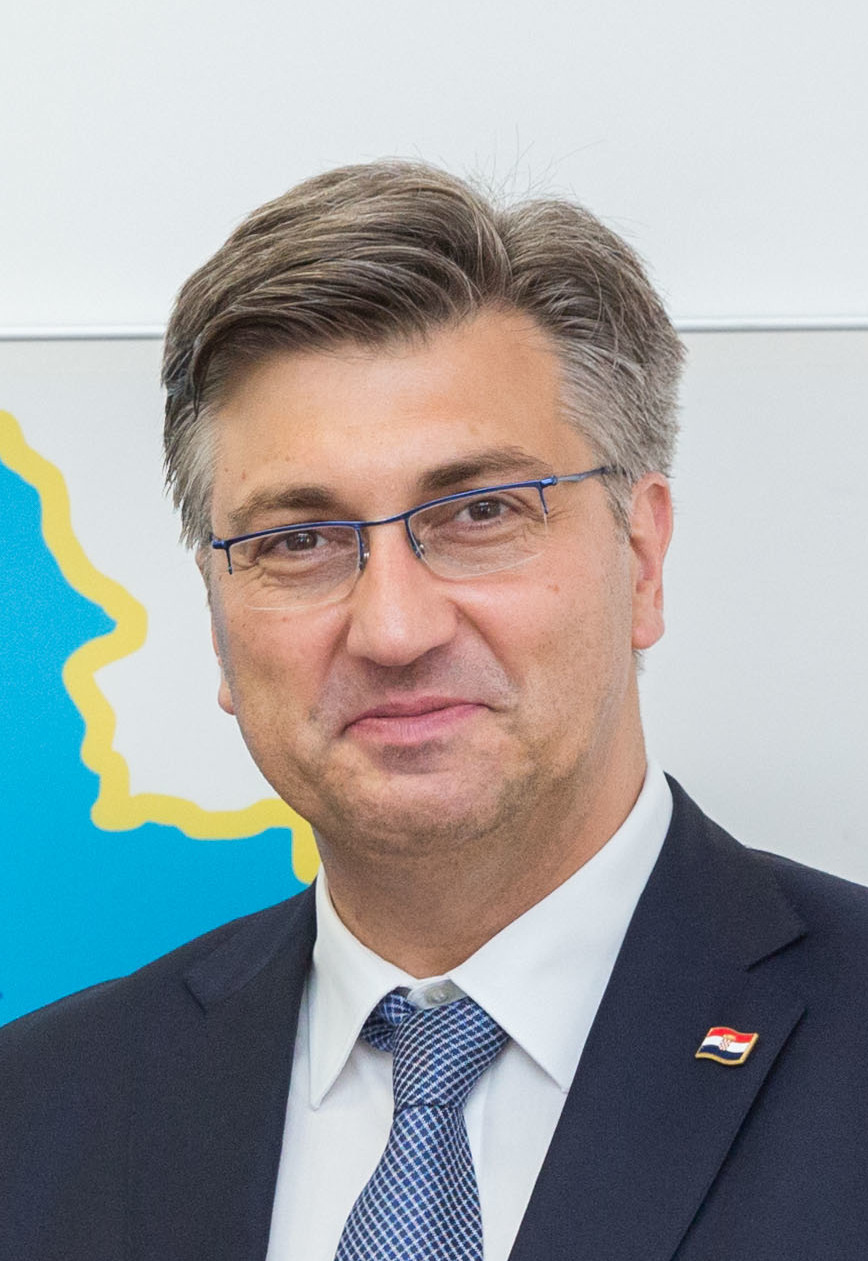
Croatian Prime Minister Andrej Plenković in 2018

On 16 March 2019, in a protest organised by the #Spasime movement, several thousand Croats demonstrated in Zagreb, Split, Šibenik and Dubrovnik, against domestic violence. Croatian Prime Minister Andrej Plenković participated in one of the demonstrations, stating "I'm here less as the Prime Minister and more as a concerned citizen."

== See also ==
- 2019 Croatian protests
- Domestic violence
- Hashtag activism
- Me Too movement
- Ele Não movement
- You Know Me movement
