= Maria da Graça Samo =

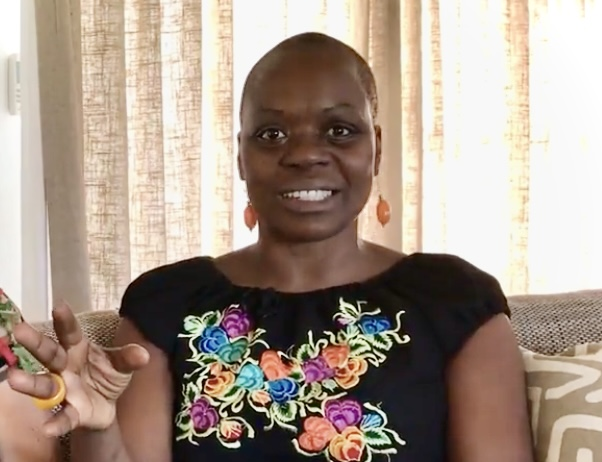
- Born: 1968 (age 56–57); Inhambane, Mozambique
- Other names: Graça Samo
- Employer: World March of Women
- Known for: Women's Rights Activism, Feminist

Maria da Graça Samo (born 1968 in Inhambane, Mozambique) is a global women's rights activist. Since 2013, Samo has been the international coordinator for the World March of Women (WMW) which is a feminist, anti-patriarchal, anti-capitalist, anti-globalization, anti-colonialist movement that aims to address the root causes of poverty and violence against women.

== Early life ==
Graça Samo was born in Inhambane, Mozambique in 1968, and is the eighth of 13 children. Her mother was a farmer and father a schoolteacher. Samo learned Portuguese from her father while her mother taught her native Xitsua. Catholicism was important in Samo's upbringing, faith, and education as both her parents were heavily religious. During Samo's upbringing, war spread throughout Mozambique from their political support of the African National Congress (ANC) against apartheid in South Africa. Discrimination that Samo witnessed and experienced growing up became the driving force behind her determination to work for women's rights and gender equality.

Samo graduated with a Master of Science degree in Education for Sustainability. Samo also completed graduate studies in Business Administration.

== Career ==
From 2004 to 2009, Samo was a professor in the Department of Management, Science, and Technology at the Polytechnic University in Mozambique.

Samo has worked in Mozambique, Angola, and Brazil. During the civil war in Angola, Samo was sent as an English interpreter and worked as a nurse to treat malnourished children. In Brazil, Samo worked with Promundo Institute to prevent violence, promote and teach young boys and men gender equality and HIV/AIDS awareness. Samo is the former executive director of Fórum Mulher (Women's Forum) from years 2004 to 2009. Fórum Mulher is a network of local groups and institutions working for women's rights and gender equality in Mozambique. Samo is the current international coordinator for the WMW.

During Samo's leadership in Fórum Mulher, the organization drafted and got Parliament to pass the first Domestic Violence Bill in Mozambique in 2009. This achievement awarded Fórum Mulher the Gender Equality Award from Femmes Africa Solidarité for fighting to achieve gender equality in policies.

== Personal life ==
Samo has a husband and two children.
