= Marche mondiale des Femmes =

International feminist movement

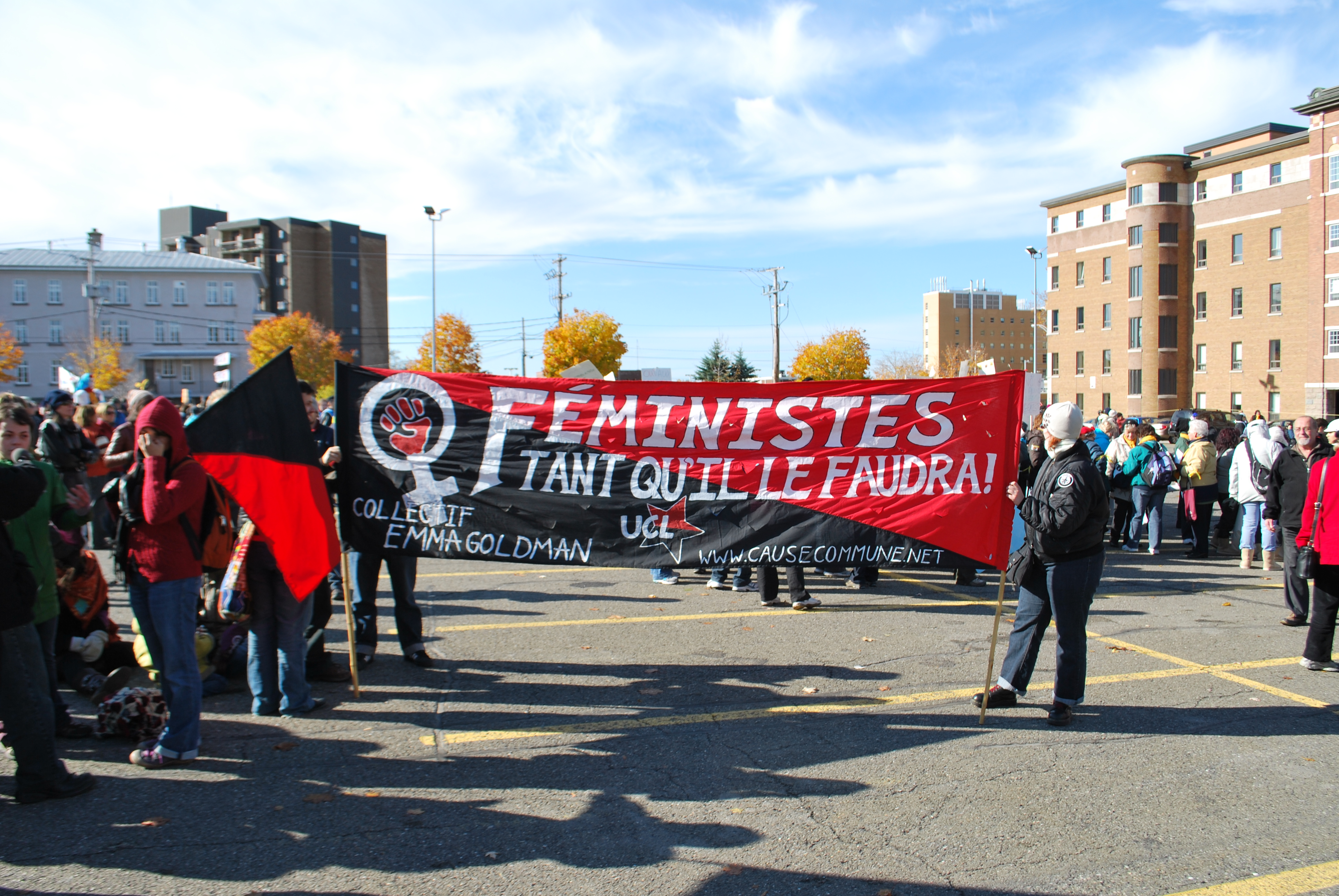
2010 march at Rimouski, Canada

The Marche mondiale des Femmes or World March of Women is an international feminist movement that advocates for gender equality and aims to take action against discrimination against women and reduce violence towards them.

== History ==
The Marche mondiale des Femmes was launched in 2000 by the Fédération des femmes du Québec, a feminist organisation based in Quebec, Canada. The idea came from a previous event, the Women's March Against Poverty, which took place in 1995, also in Québec. This involved some 2,500 women in three groups marching for ten days before presenting nine demands to the authorities relating to economic justice.

Planning for the Marche mondiale des Femmes began in 1997, and in October 1998, a meeting was held in Montréal, Canada, in which 140 women representing 65 countries took part. They agreed to two main themes for the march: the elimination of world poverty and the cessation of violence towards women.

== March ==
The march started on 8 March 2000, International Women's Day, and ended on 17 October, International Day for the Eradication of Poverty. Marches took place in several countries including Bombay and Brussels. In New York, a petition was handed to United Nations representatives setting out proposals that would help eliminate the problems of world poverty and domestic violence. The march has become an annual event in many cities across the world.

== See also ==
- Women's March (disambiguation)
- Me Too movement
- Ele Não movement
- Spasime movement
