= Mona Eltahawy =

Egyptian-American journalist (born 1967)

Mona Eltahawy منى الطحاوي
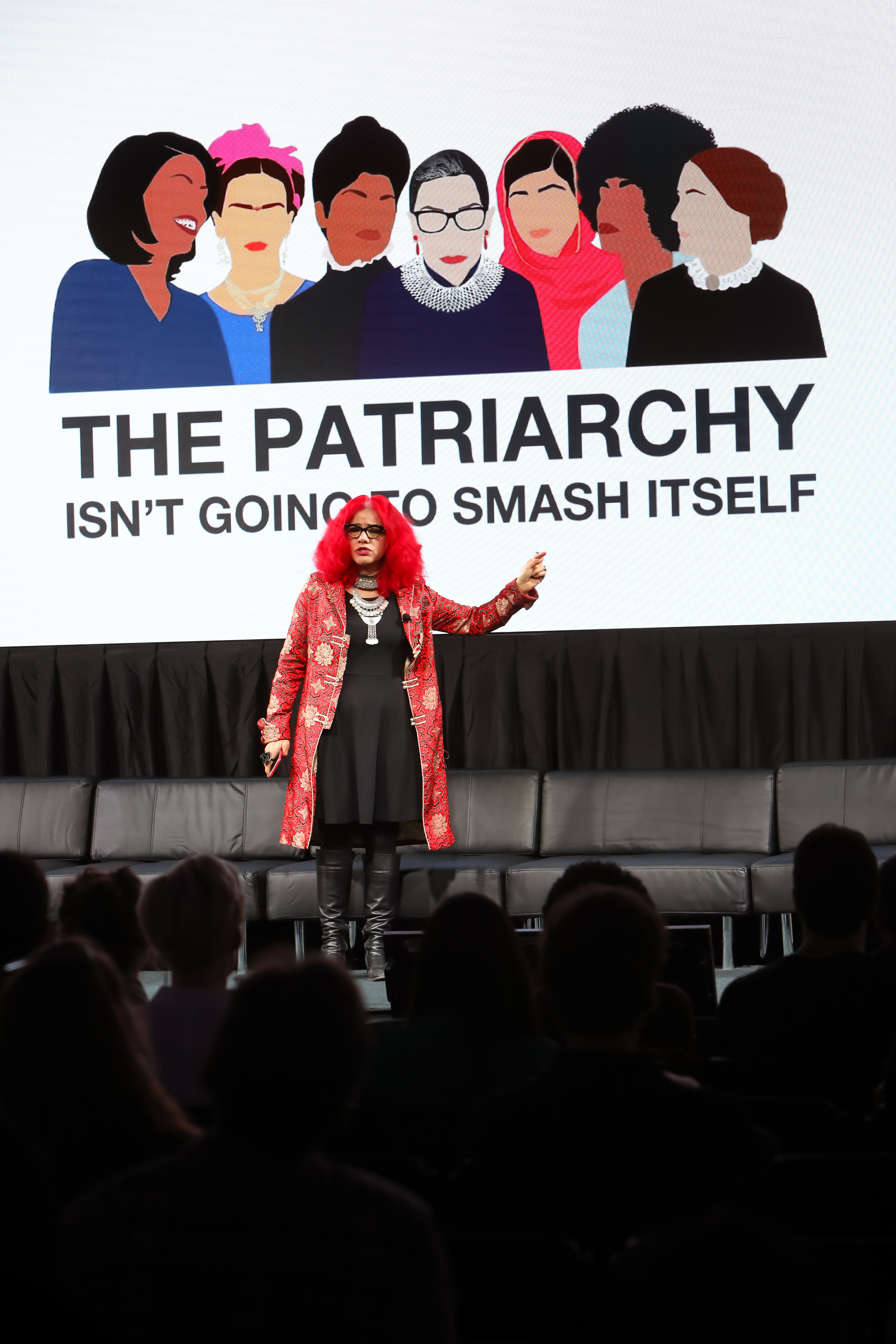
- Eltahawy at MIT Media Lab's 2018 Disobedience Awards
- Born: August 1, 1967 (age 59); Port Said, United Arab Republic (present-day Egypt)
- Education: The American University in Cairo
- Occupation: Journalist
- Website: monaeltahawy.com

Mona Eltahawy (Arabic: منى الطحاوى, IPA: [ˈmonæ (ʔe)t.tˤɑˈħɑːwi]; born August 1, 1967) is an Egyptian-American freelance journalist and social commentator. Based in New York City, she has written essays and op-eds for publications worldwide on Egypt and the Islamic world, on topics including women's rights, patriarchy, and Muslim political and social affairs. Her work has appeared in The Washington Post, The New York Times, Christian Science Monitor, and the Miami Herald among others. Headscarves and Hymens, Eltahawy's first book, was published in May 2015. Eltahawy has been a guest analyst on U.S. radio and television news shows. She is among people who spearheaded the Mosque Me Too movement by using the hashtag #MosqueMeToo.

Eltahawy has spoken publicly at universities, panel discussions and interfaith gatherings on human rights and reform in the Islamic world, feminism and Egyptian Muslim–Christian relations, among other concerns.

== Early life ==
Eltahawy was born in Port Said, Egypt. Her family moved to the UK when she was seven years old and then to Saudi Arabia when she was 15. She graduated from the American University in Cairo in 1990 with a bachelor's degree and in 1992 she earned a master's degree in mass communication with a concentration in journalism.

== Career ==
Eltahawy was a news reporter throughout the 1990s, and a correspondent for the Reuters News Agency in Cairo and Jerusalem. She has written news and opinion articles for The Guardian, the International Herald-Tribune, The Washington Post, U.S. News & World Report, and The New York Times. In September 2020 she started a newsletter, Feminist Giant.

She moved to the United States in 2000 and gained American citizenship in 2011.

From 2003 to 2004, Eltahawy was managing editor of the now defunct Arabic-language version of Women's eNews, an independent, non-profit news website that covers women's issues from around the world.

She wrote a weekly column for the Saudi-owned, London-based international Arab publication Asharq Al-Awsat from 2004 to 2006 before her articles were discontinued by editor Tariq Alhomayed for being "too critical" of the Egyptian regime.

On November 24, 2011, she was one of numerous journalists arrested by the Egyptian authorities while covering renewed protests in Cairo's Tahrir Square. She was held in custody for 12 hours, during which time she was interrogated, and both physically and sexually assaulted. Her left arm and right hand were fractured.

On September 25, 2012, Eltahawy was arrested for spraypainting over an American Freedom Defense Initiative advertisement in a New York City Subway station that read: "In any war between the civilized man and the savage, support the civilized man. Support Israel. Defeat Jihad". Toward the end of the incident two police officers approached the area and arrested her. In an interview on CNN, she confirmed she was arraigned and charged with Criminal Mischief, Making Graffiti, and Possession of a Graffiti Instrument. She defended herself by saying what she had done was freedom of expression and that her actions were civil disobedience.

Eltahawy's first book, Headscarves and Hymens: Why the Middle East Needs a Sexual Revolution, was published in the United States on April 21, 2015, by Farrar, Straus and Giroux. The book is based on a piece about misogyny in Arab society entitled "Why Do They Hate Us?", which she wrote for Foreign Policy in 2012.

In September 2019, Eltahawy released her second book, The Seven Necessary Sins for Women and Girls.

== Politics and views ==
Eltahawy was a board member of the Progressive Muslim Union of North America during its existence from 2004 to 2006.

Eltahawy has criticised the regimes of both Hosni Mubarak and the Egypt-based Muslim Brotherhood, referring to them as "old, out-of-touch men". In an interview in February 2011, she said the Muslim Brotherhood could not "gain the support of the majority of Egyptians". In November 2011, Eltahawy faced repercussions by Egyptian security forces as a result of her criticism. Covering the protests at Tahrir Square, she was brutally beaten and sexually assaulted by Egyptian riot police, breaking both of her arms.

In 2009, The Economist said Eltahawy used the phrase "the opium of the Arabs" referring to Israel, describing, as the magazine elaborated, "an intoxicating way for them to forget their own failings or at least blame them on someone else. Arab leaders have long practice of using Israel as a pretext for maintaining states of emergency at home and putting off reform."

Eltahawy speaks out on women's rights in the Arab world, attacking female genital mutilation. In a May 2012 article in Foreign Policy, she wrote, "Name me an Arab country, and I'll recite a litany of abuses [of women] fueled by a toxic mix of culture and religion that few seem willing or able to disentangle lest they blaspheme or offend." She described herself as "a secular, radical feminist Muslim" in a 2011 interview.

Eltahawy is a supporter of LGBTQ rights all over the world and an African (Egyptian) Arab supporter as well as an anarchist feminist.

In a 2012 Canadian Broadcasting Corporation (CBC) interview with Piya Chattopadhyay, Eltahawy "says being civil, respectful and polite are ineffective, and instead women must harness the seven qualities — or 'necessary sins' — of anger, attention, ambition, power, profanity, violence and lust." Later, she asked people to "imagine a scenario in which we kill a certain number of men every week. How many men must we kill until patriarchy sits across the table from us and says, 'OK, stop. What must we do, so that you can stop this culling?' Now I'm saying imagine. I'm not saying go out there and kill 100 men today. I'm saying, just imagine this very, very disturbing scenario."

In 2020, Eltahawy began publishing personal essays and political commentary via her newsletter, Feminist Giant.

In the wake of new restrictive abortion laws in Texas, Eltahawy spoke up to oppose them, having previously warned of developments of this kind. She declared that she had undergone two abortions: one illegal procedure in Egypt when she was 29 and a legal one in Seattle, United States, four years later when she was married.

== Awards and honors ==
- 2005 – Muslim Leader of Tomorrow by the American Society for Muslim Advancement
- 2006 – Distinguished Visiting professor at the American University in Cairo
- 2006 – Cutting Edge Prize, for distinguished contribution to the coverage of the Middle East by Next Century Foundation
- 2009 – Samir Kassir Award for Freedom of the Press, for opinion writing by the European Commission
- 2010 – Special Prize for Outstanding Contribution to Journalism, Anna Lindh Foundation
- 2012 – number 258, among Power 500 2012, Arabian Business
- 2014 – Women's Media Center Speaking Truth to Power Award
- 2019 – number 54 in the list of "The 100 Most Influential Africans", The Africa Report.

== Bibliography ==
- Headscarves and Hymens: Why the Middle East Needs a Sexual Revolution (2015)
- The Seven Necessary Sins for Women and Girls (2019)

== See also ==
- MosqueMeToo movement
