= Amelia Bonow =

American abortion rights activist

Amelia Bonow (born November 3, 1984) is an American abortion rights activist, and co-creator of the social media campaign #ShoutYourAbortion, along with fellow activists Lindy West and Kimberly Morrison. She is the Founding Director of #ShoutYourAbortion. Bonow's writing has appeared in The New Republic, The Huffington Post, The New York Daily News, and Salon, among others.

== Early life and education ==
Bonow was born in Gig Harbor, WA in 1984. She graduated with a BA in Cultural Anthropology from Seattle University in 2011. During and after college, Bonow worked as a bartender and was active in Seattle’s art and music scene, producing events and hosting fundraisers. She originally planned to become a therapist, attending a master's program in Clinical Mental Health Counseling at Antioch University in Seattle. While attending school, she began volunteering as a phone worker at King County Crisis Clinic.

== Abortion activism ==
On September 18, 2015, the U.S. House of Representatives voted to defund Planned Parenthood. This decision came after anti-abortion advocates at the Center for Medical Progress, including founder David Daleiden, produced a series of undercover videos showing that Planned Parenthood illegally sold fetal tissue on the black market. Planned Parenthood states that they donate fetal tissue to research at the request of patients.

Prompted by the Deleiden scandal, Bonow began talking to friends including writer Lindy West and musician Kimberly Morrison about creating a public project for speaking out about their own abortions. What was once supposed to be a zine soon became an international movement.

On September 19, 2015, Bonow logged into Facebook and opened up about her own abortion, which took place in 2013. She later spoke about her experience with Salon.com, stating:

"The only thing that happens at the Madison Avenue Planned Parenthood on Saturdays is abortion. Every person you see in the clinic is having an abortion, or helping someone have an abortion. The moment I entered the clinic that morning, I felt myself lift and become stronger because of the women around me. I felt connected to every woman I saw, and I tried to make them know this with my eyes. I used my eyes to thank every nurse, and to tell every woman in the waiting room that I felt strong and I wanted her to feel strong too. As I sat in the waiting room, I felt clear and calm. The nurse called my name and smiled at me; I kissed my boyfriend, rose to my feet, and walked toward the end of a mistake. Motherhood was not an option for me, so there was no choice to be made, and I felt certain that I would not feel guilt or sadness about the procedure after the fact. My conviction felt righteous in the most positive sense of the word. Exercising the right to control my own fertility, surrounded by strangers who felt like people I knew, made me feel like one of the luckiest women in the world. I am.”

After speaking out on social media about her abortion, Bonow sent a text to West telling her that she'd just told everyone on Facebook about her abortion. West, adding the hashtag #shoutyourabortion, shared the status update with her 60,000+ followers and it immediately went viral. It received front-page coverage in major news outlets, including The New York Times and the Los Angeles Times, among others. The hashtag and coverage received backlash from anti-abortion groups, politicians, and commentators but also saw a huge groundswell of support from pro-choice activists and other leaders of the reproductive rights movement, including then-president of the Planned Parenthood Federation of America Cecile Richards.

Following this success, Bonow immediately left her graduate program and began developing #shoutyourabortion (also called SYA for short) into one of the leaders of the reproductive rights movement. Bonow, West, and Morrison began creating platforms dedicated to normalizing abortion and allowing people to discuss abortions online, in art and media, and throughout their communities. The movement has extended its creative works to murals, clothing, books, music videos, and visual art.

In 2016, Bonow joined the board of the Abortion Care Network, a national organization that supports independent abortion providers.

In 2018, Bonow co-edited and contributed essays to SYA’s self-titled book. The book was promoted on The Daily Show with Trevor Noah.

In 2021, Bonow and #ShoutYourAbortion received widespread media attention after activists ingested Mifepristone during opening arguments during the Supreme Court’s Dobbs’ decision in order to raise awareness of abortion pills and express displeasure towards the expected verdict.

== In Media ==
In December 2022, Bonow, along with 16 other activists was honored by Lizzo at the People's Choice Awards. Bonow displayed a purse on stage that read “Abortion Pills Forever”. This appearance and photos of Bonow were widely published.

== Awards ==
In 2016, Bonow received the Hammer and Chisel Award from award-winning filmmaker Michael Moore.

In 2017, #shoutyourabortion’s website, created by Seattle-based creative agency Civilization, won a Webby Award for Best Activist website.
