= 2019 Croatian protests =

Social movements and protests in Zagreb

The 2019 Croatian protests was an influx of movements and peaceful demonstrations in Zagreb, as part of a popular uprising against a surge in Violence against women and participated in rallies as part of the Spasime movement. The protests have been nicknamed the #Justice for Girls, #Save Me! Movement and #Me too! Movement.

== Background ==
In Croatia, protesters were on the streets after a wave of Violence against women and injustice against young girls. Girls and women has suffered a history of violence in Croatia, so they called on Marches and Rallies to be held in public in protest.

== Protests ==
Mass rallies was held in Zagreb on 16 March, in protest at violence against women. Thousands rallied in town squares and city-centres in streets for a day. Justice rallies and different street protests grew in late-October, when justice for girls rallies were taking place across Zagreb at protest against violence.

== See also ==
- 2011 Croatian protests
- 2024 Zagreb protest
