= Sue Perlgut =

American poet

Sue Perlgut is a second-wave feminist who was a central figure in It's All Right To Be Woman Theatre, a women's theater collective founded in 1970 in New York City that operated without a director.

Perlgut studied educational theatre and worked as a director, performer, playwright, puppet maker, teacher, arts administrator, and producer. Perlgut taught theater at Richmond College and in New York City. She was one of the first people to suggest that women confess their abortions publicly, which led to the #ShoutYourAbortion movement.

Owner: Close to Home Productions, CloseToHomeProductions.com

Director: Women's Wisdom Project, facebook.com/WomensWisdomProject

Director: It's All Right To Be Woman Theatre, ItsAllRightToBeWomanTheatre.com

Director: Women Artists Have Their Say, WomenArtistsHaveTheirSay

Director: Connie Cook, A Documentary, ConnieCookFilm.com
