= MosqueMeToo =

Muslim women's movement

#MosqueMeToo is a Muslim women's movement where female pilgrims speak up about sexual abuse, such as being groped, inappropriately touched or having someone rub against them in the crowd, experienced on the Hajj, the Islamic pilgrimage to one of Islam's holiest places, Mecca, Saudi Arabia. The movement spread to Muslim women sharing sexual abuse experiences at other Muslim religious centers and holy places across the world such as at Jama Masjid, New Delhi, India. The usage of the 'Me Too' in the movement stems from the Me Too movement, which gained worldwide prominence in October 2017, and is similar to the #ChurchToo campaign in Evangelicalism.

== Background ==
In February 2018, a Pakistani Muslim woman shared her experiences on Facebook of sexual abuse at the Hajj. The post was subsequently deleted, but not before it had been seen by enough people to inspire more women to share their experiences.

Mona Eltahawy, an Egyptian American journalist, shared her experiences of sexual abuse on Hajj in a book in 1982, which were retweeted in February using the hashtag #MosqueMeToo. The first experience occurred when Eltahawy was 15 years old. Her tweet was shared more than 2,000 within a 24-hour period. At the time of the event she remembered thinking, "Who wants to talk about sexual assault at a holy place? No one would believe it." Many other women came to the social media using the hashtag #MosqueMeToo to also share their experiences of sexual abuse on this religious pilgrimage.

As of August 2018, hundreds of women had shared stories of sexual assault at the Hajj. According to stories collected by CNN, most assaults occurred during the Tawaf ritual at the Kaaba.

== Critiques ==
On social media some people reacted to this movement critically, by saying that it is a tool of Islamophobia or Western propaganda. Supporters countered that victims should not stay silent just to avoid negative impressions of Muslims.

== See also ==
- MeToo movement
- Incidents during the Hajj
