= Hashtag activism =

Use of hashtags for internet activism

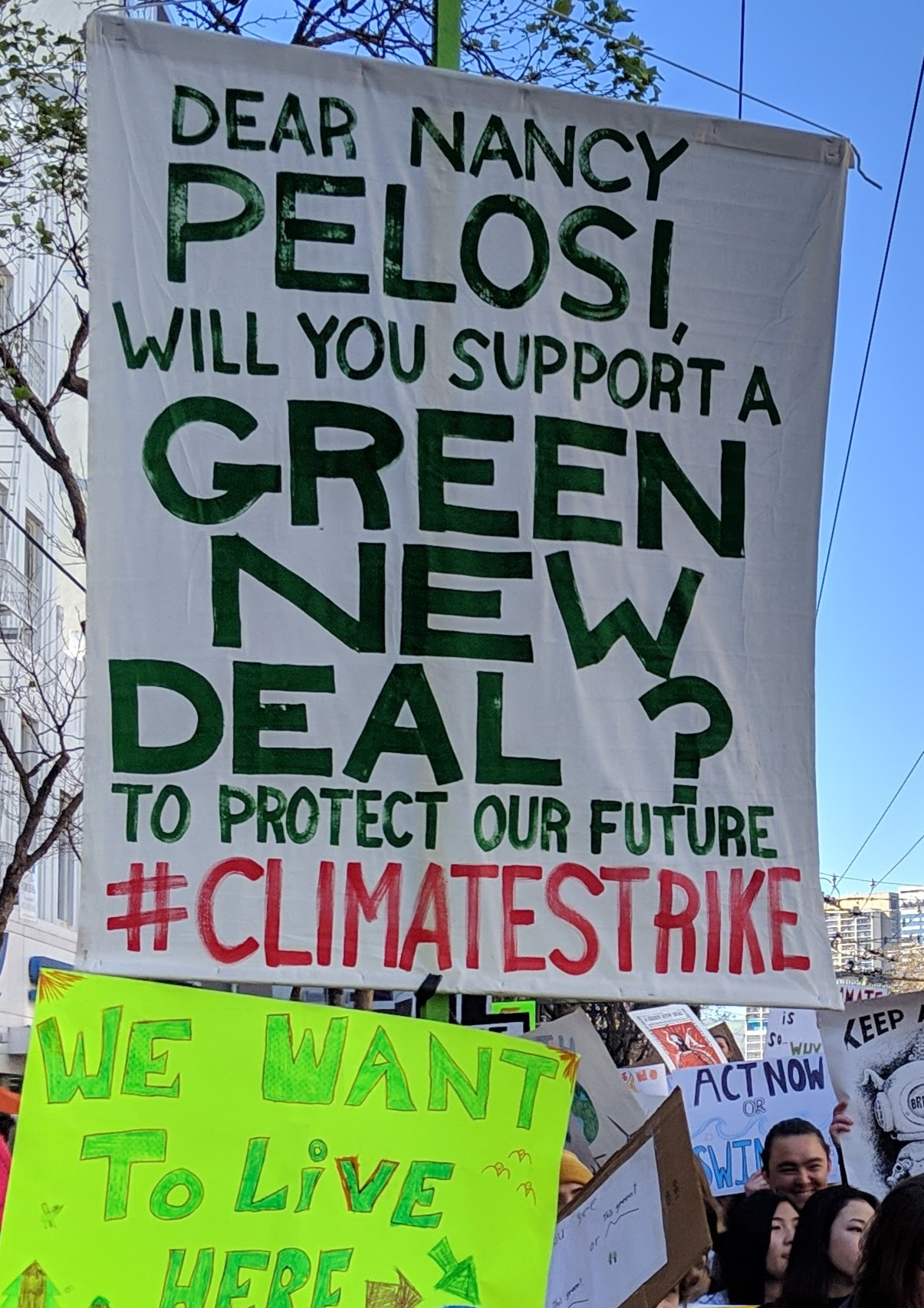
A hashtag on a protest placard in 2019

Hashtag activism refers to the use of hashtags on social media platforms as a form of Internet activism. It has become a significant tool for civic engagement and the advancement of social movements. By attaching a hashtag to a post, users can share information and opinions on social or political issues, enabling others to engage in a broader online conversation that has the potential to drive change. A hashtag typically consists of a word or phrase related to a specific cause, creating a space for public discourse. Social media also serves as a critical platform for historically marginalized groups, allowing them to communicate, mobilize, and advocate for issues that may be overlooked by the mainstream media.

Supporters of hashtag activism argue that it enables users to connect with global audience and disseminate information rapidly. Critics, however, question its effectiveness, suggesting that it often amounts to symbolic support rather than meaningful action, as users may simply post a hashtag without engaging in concrete efforts to create change.

== History ==
The modern use of hashtag on social media was first proposed in 2007 by former Google developer Chris Messina on Twitter. His intention was to create a meta tag system that would allow users to track dynamic content related to specific event or topics. Initially, Twitter dismissed the idea, stating that, "these things were for nerds". However, later that year, the hashtag #sandiegofire gained traction during the California wildfires, helping users share updates, locate loved ones and monitor safety information. This success demonstrated the hashtag's potential, leading to its broader adoption across platforms like Facebook, Instagram and TikTok. Since then, hashtags have been widely used to coordinate conversations, build communities and organize protests, empowering users to actively participate in social and political movements.

== Notable examples ==
The following notable examples are organized by categories: human rights, awareness, political, and trends.

=== Race ===
==== United States origin ====
===== #BlackLivesMatter =====
The Black Lives Matter movement calls for an end to police brutality and the killings of African-Americans in the U.S. The #BlackLivesMatter hashtag was first started by Alicia Garza, Patrisse Cullors, and Opal Tometi as a response to the trial and later acquittal of George Zimmerman who shot and killed 17-year-old Trayvon Martin. The hashtag saw a revival in 2014, after the shooting of Michael Brown in Ferguson, Missouri, and after a grand jury did not indict police officer Daniel Pantaleo in the death of Eric Garner. During the summer of 2020, the hashtag saw another resurgence due to the deaths of George Floyd and Breonna Taylor at the hands of police.

===== #IStandWithAhmed =====
Avatar of President Obama

President Obama
(@POTUS44)
tweeted:

Cool clock, Ahmed. Want to bring it to the White House? We should inspire more kids like you to like science. It's what makes America great.

September 16, 2015

I stand with Ahmed: In 2015, a teenage student named Ahmed Mohamed was arrested at his high school in Irving, Texas after his teacher mistook his reassembled clock for a bomb. Ultimately, he was not convicted of any crimes, but he was suspended from school. Shortly after his story hit the news, a tech blogger named Anil Dash tweeted a picture of Ahmed being arrested in his NASA(National Aeronautics and Space Administration) T-shirt along with the #IstandwithAhmed. His tweet went viral and drew accusations of racism and Islamophobia against the school. It sparked an online movement where many individuals, including scientists and engineers, tweeted their support for Ahmed under the same hashtag.

===== #TakeAKnee =====
#TakeAKnee has been a movement since 2016 and was created with the intention of calling attention to the police brutality and racial inequality taking place in America. This movement was enacted primarily by NFL athletes, most notably Colin Kaepernick, through kneeling for the duration of the national anthem; this act has stirred significant controversy because it is interpreted by nationalists as being a disrespectful act that insults the American flag, veterans, and the values the flag represents. This movement ultimately led to #BoycottNFL and controversy that resulted in the NFL ban requiring players to stand for the national anthem, or stay in the locker room. #TakeAKnee is often known as "the U.S. National Anthem Protest", and is often compared to protests during the civil rights era, lending to a chain of protests led by athletes in different sports. While the police brutality being faced by African Americans was being protested, white American athletes were also seen taking a knee. As a whole, the #TakeAKnee movement created controversy questioning the legal and constitutional rights of individuals and their ability to protest the U.S. National Anthem.

===== #MyAsianAmericanStory =====
In August 2015, "a 15-year-old high student named Jason Fong created #MyAsianAmericanStory to highlight immigration stories of Asian Americans after presidential candidate Jeb Bush made a remark about Asian people and their "anchor babies". Fong stated that he started the hashtag to show that "Asian-Americans are part of the American narrative". Users of the tag tweeted about their diverse family immigration histories and encounters with racism. Fong said he was inspired to start #MyAsianAmericanStory in part by hashtags such as #BlackLivesMatter and participated in other hashtag campaigns such as #Asians4BlackLives in order to show his support for dismantling "a broken system that protects police misconduct".

===== #thisis2016 =====
In October 2016, following an anti-Asian incident in New York City and the subsequent open letter to the victim from Michael Luo, The New York Times released a video entitled "#thisis2016: Asian-Americans Respond". The video featured Asian Americans who had experienced racism. #thisis2016 subsequently emerged as a hashtag to highlight racism Asian Americans faced. Eventually, #BrownAsiansExist came to prominence following an open letter written to The New York Times expressing their disappointment in the lack of South and Southeast Asian Americans in their "#thisis2016" video. #BrownAsiansExist more broadly highlights the erasure of South Asian and Southeast Asian Americans in the American media's portrayal of Asian Americans.

===== #OscarsSoWhite =====
#OscarSoWhite is a hashtag campaign started by BroadwayBlack.com managing editor April Reign and was sparked by the Oscars nominees in 2016. All of the 20 actors nominated for lead and supporting actor categories were white, despite multiple films that year starring African American leads that had received critics' prizes and guild awards. The campaign sparked a conversation about diversity, representation, and racism in the film industry. The movement is connected to causing enough external pressure to significantly change the racial composition of academy membership. Following the peak of the hashtag's popularity, the academy instated 41% minority voters and 46% female voters. Production companies felt the pressure as well, and subsequently diversified their casting and staffing decisions as well, hiring Ava Duvernay, an African-American female director, to head the production of A Wrinkle in Time and hiring non-white actors in the traditionally white Star Wars series.

=== Black Women's Rights ===
==== United States origin ====
===== #SayHerName =====
#SayHerName originated in 2015 by the African American Policy Forum spearheaded by Kimberle Crenshaw. The purpose of #SayHerName was to bring media and public attention to the abuse and murder of Black women (both cis- and transgender) at the hands of the police. The alleged suicide of Sandra Bland after being taken into police custody made the hashtag viral and allowed for the exposure, sharing, and investigation into the stories of other Black women who died as a result of police violence. #SayHerName was also associated with the deaths of Breonna Taylor, Aura Rosser, Tanisha Anderson, and many others.

===== #ShareTheMicNow =====
On June 10, 2020, the #ShareTheMicNow campaign featured 52 Black women—including Luvvie Ajayi, Bozoma Saint John, Alicia Garza, Brittany Packnett Cunningham, and Christine Michel Carter—temporarily taking over the Instagram accounts of 52 white women with large followings, including Julia Roberts, Gwyneth Paltrow, Reese Witherspoon, Kourtney Kardashian, and Rachel Bloom, in an effort to amplify Black women’s voices on racial justice and social issues.

=== Women's rights ===
==== United States origin ====
===== #YesAllWomen =====
YesAllWomen is a Twitter hashtag and social media campaign in which users share examples or stories of misogyny and violence against women. #YesAllWomen was created in reaction to another hashtag #NotAllMen, to express that all women are affected by sexism and harassment, even though not all men are sexist. The hashtag quickly became used by women throughout social media to share their experiences of misogyny and sexism. The hashtag was popular in May 2014 surrounding discussions of the 2014 Isla Vista killings.

===== #ShoutYourAbortion =====
#ShoutYourAbortion is a hashtag and social media campaign used on Twitter that encourages women who have experience with abortion to break the silence surrounding it. The hashtag was created by American writer Lindy West and friends Amelia Bonow and Kimberly Morrison in response to the US House of Representatives efforts to defund Planned Parenthood following the Planned Parenthood 2015 undercover videos controversy.

===== #ilooklikeanengineer =====
In August 2015, the #ilooklikeanengineer campaign started. The movement was started by Isis Anchalee to promote discussion of gender issues. Anchalee created the hashtag in response to backlash regarding her face being featured in an ad campaign for the company she works for. One year after the creation of #ilooklikeanengineer 250,000 people had used the hashtag.

===== #MeToo =====
#MeToo is a Twitter hashtag that raises awareness about sexual assault by encouraging survivors to share their stories. The hashtag was initially first used in 2007 by Tarana Burke but was later popularized and brought to the attention of the media on October 15, 2017, when Alyssa Milano, using Twitter, encouraged individuals to speak up about their experience with assault and say 'Me Too'. Initially meant to simply raise awareness, #MeToo developed into a movement and as of October 2018, the hashtag had been used 19 million times. The movement has sparked many other movements like #HowIWillChange and has also led to certain punishments towards the perpetrators. As a reaction, the #HimToo hashtag was created. It that refers to the social media campaign for false rape allegation.

===== #WomensMarch =====
On January 21, 2017, an estimated 2.6 million individuals marched around the world in response to the rhetoric of newly elected President Donald Trump. The march was organized primarily online through Facebook. Now occurring annually, the goal of the Women's March is to raise awareness and advocates for human rights through peaceful protest.

Similar to other hashtag movements, #WomensMarch has an online presence. The movement has a Facebook page that is active, verified under the name Women's March, that was created on November 20, 2016. As of April 2, 2019, the page is liked by over 800,000 individuals and has a following of more than 850,000 users. Outside of the official page, there are multiple pages defined by geographic region including but not limited to Women's March on Connecticut, Women's March on San Diego, and Women's March Milan. In addition to Facebook, the Women's March Movement has an active profile on Instagram and as of April 2019 the page has 1.2 million followers.

==== International origin ====
===== #EleNão =====
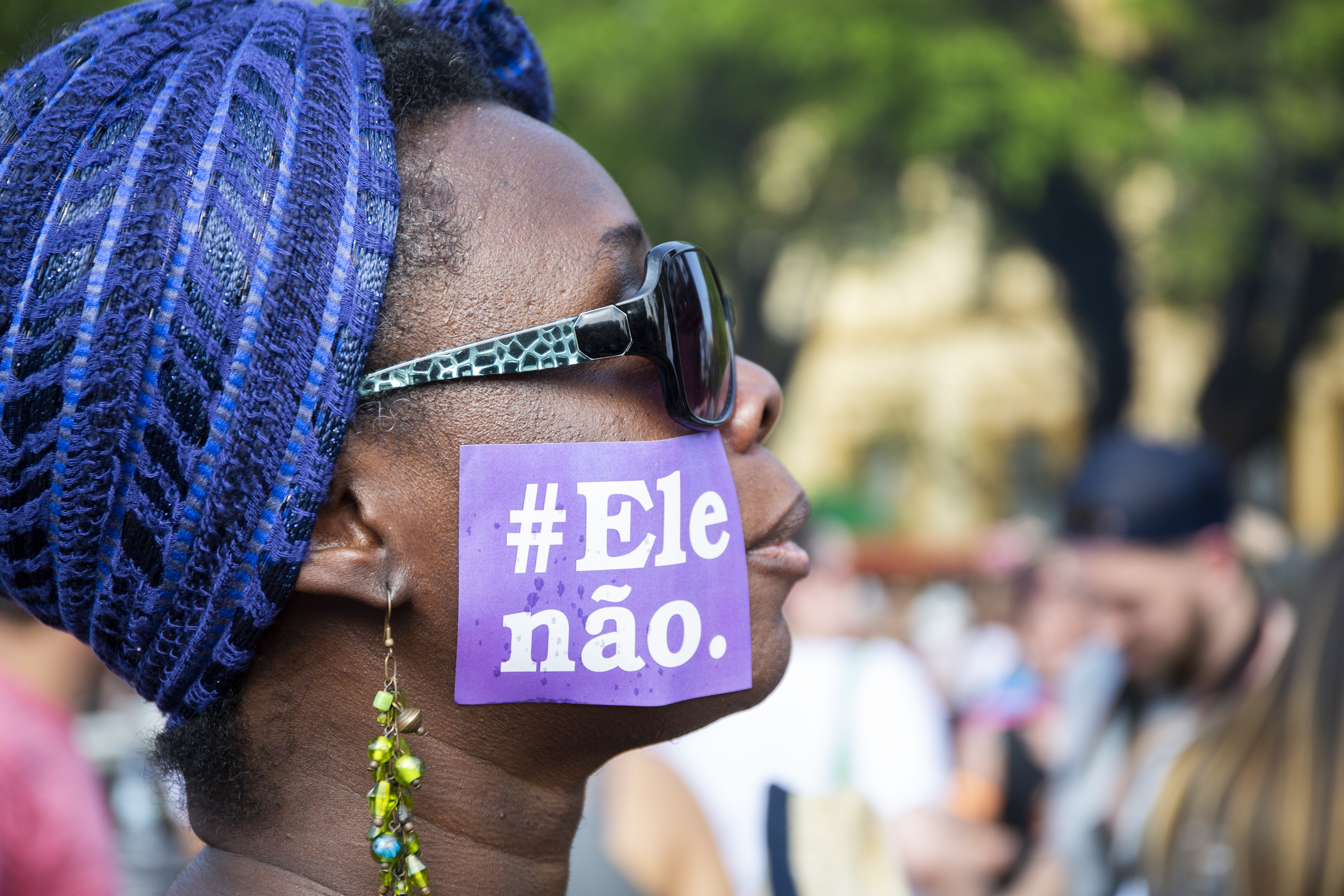
Protester in Porto Alegre, Brazil, participating in the Ele Não movement.

On September 19, 2018, the Ele Não movement ("Ele Não" is Portuguese for "not him"), also known as the protests against Jair Bolsonaro, were demonstrations led by women which took place in several regions of Brazil and the world. The main goal was to protest against Bolsonaro and his presidential campaign and his sexist declarations.

===== #WhereisPengShuai =====
After the November 2021 disappearance of Chinese tennis player Peng Shuai, the hashtag #WhereisPengShuai appeared on Twitter and was Tweeted by athletes such as Serena Williams and Naomi Osaka.

===== #MahsaAmini =====
Amini's beating and death caused widespread anger among several social networks. The hashtag #MahsaAmini became one of the most repeated hashtags on Persian Twitter. The number of tweets and retweets of these hashtags exceeded 80 million. Some Iranian women posted videos on social media of themselves cutting their hair in protest. It was reported on 21 September that the Iranian government had blocked internet access to Instagram and WhatsApp and disrupted internet service in Kurdistan and other parts of Iran in an attempt to silence the unrest. As of 24 September 2022, the hashtag #Mahsa_Amini and its equivalent in Persian broke the Twitter record with more than 80 million tweets.

===== #MosqueMeToo =====
In February 2018, the Mosque Me Too movement started, following the Me Too movement which gained worldwide prominence in October 2017 and the following months. Muslim women started sharing their experiences of sexual abuse at Muslim holy sites and on pilgrimages such as Hajj, Mecca, Saudi Arabia, using the hashtag #MosqueMeToo.

====== Other examples ======
A 2012 Twitter discussion among women working in games, collated under the hashtag #1reasonwhy, indicated that sexist practices such as the oversexualization of female video game characters, workplace harassment and unequal pay for men and women were common in the games industry.

The hashtag #NotYourAsianSidekick was initiated by Suey Park and Juliet Shen in December 2013 on Twitter. Suey Park is a freelance writer who is most known for her Twitter campaign to cancel the Colbert Show, while Juliet Shen ran a blog on Asian American feminism. They started the hashtag town hall as a way to create a platform for structured conversation around misogyny and issues specific to Asian American women. In less than 24 hours, #NotYourAsianSidekick had been used over 45,000 times.

DeafTalent is a hashtag used to highlight through social media the capabilities of the deaf and hard of hearing community. Prior to the hashtag's emergence, in the creative industry, hearing actors had been cast in deaf roles. The SAGE Deaf Studies Encyclopedia wrote, "In response to this, the social media hashtags #DeafTalent and #POCDeafTalent were created. The hashtags, while originally used to point out problematic portrayals of deaf characters and sign language in the media, are now also used to celebrate the wide breadth and multiplicity of deaf actors, artists, and other talent in the world."

The hashtag, #Boymom, has taken to social media platforms in order to display the so-called "chaotic" and "messy" experiences mothers of boys go through. Instagram appears to be the platform with the most #Boymom hashtags, with nearly 12.9 million hashtags. #Girlmom falls significantly behind in numbers with only 4.8 million. Currently, there is much speculation surrounding this hashtag. People argue that it creates an environment for children where they feel unable to fully express their gender. Some people even go as far as to say that it perpetuates the sexist idea that sons are valued more than daughters.

Overtourism, the phenomenon whereby certain places of interest are visited by excessive numbers of tourists, causing undesirable effects for the places visited has also become a widely used hashtag since 2016, when the phrase took off, after it gained significant momentum after a Skift, travel industry news and research company, article. Skift's use of the term brought global attention to a growing problem of perceptions of excessive tourism, sparking conversations about how to manage tourism more sustainably. Based on a Twitter social network analysis, a paper found the #overtourism network is held together by a small number of experts, who play a key role in presenting, distributing and circulating information about the topic.

=== Awareness ===
==== United States origin ====
===== #Kony2012 =====
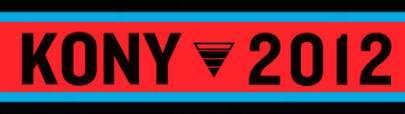
A Kony 2012 poster

Kony 2012 is a short film produced by Invisible Children, Inc. (authors of Invisible Children). It was released on March 5, 2012.

The film's purpose was to promote the charity's "Stop Kony" movement to make African cult and militia leader, indicted war criminal and the International Criminal Court fugitive Joseph Kony globally known in order to have him arrested by the end of 2012, when the campaign expired. The film spread virally through the #Kony2012 hashtag.

===== #WhyIStayed =====
In 2014, a media release of security camera footage that appeared to show NFL player, Ray Rice, punching his then-fiancée, Janay Rice, sparked public conversation on why victims of abuse stay in abusive relationships. In response to this question, writer and domestic abuse survivor Beverly Gooden started the #WhyIStayed campaign via Twitter in an effort to "change the tone of the conversation". The hashtag began to trend nationally five hours after its creation and was used more than 46,000 times that day. Beverly appeared on NPR's All Things Considered to discuss hashtag activism.

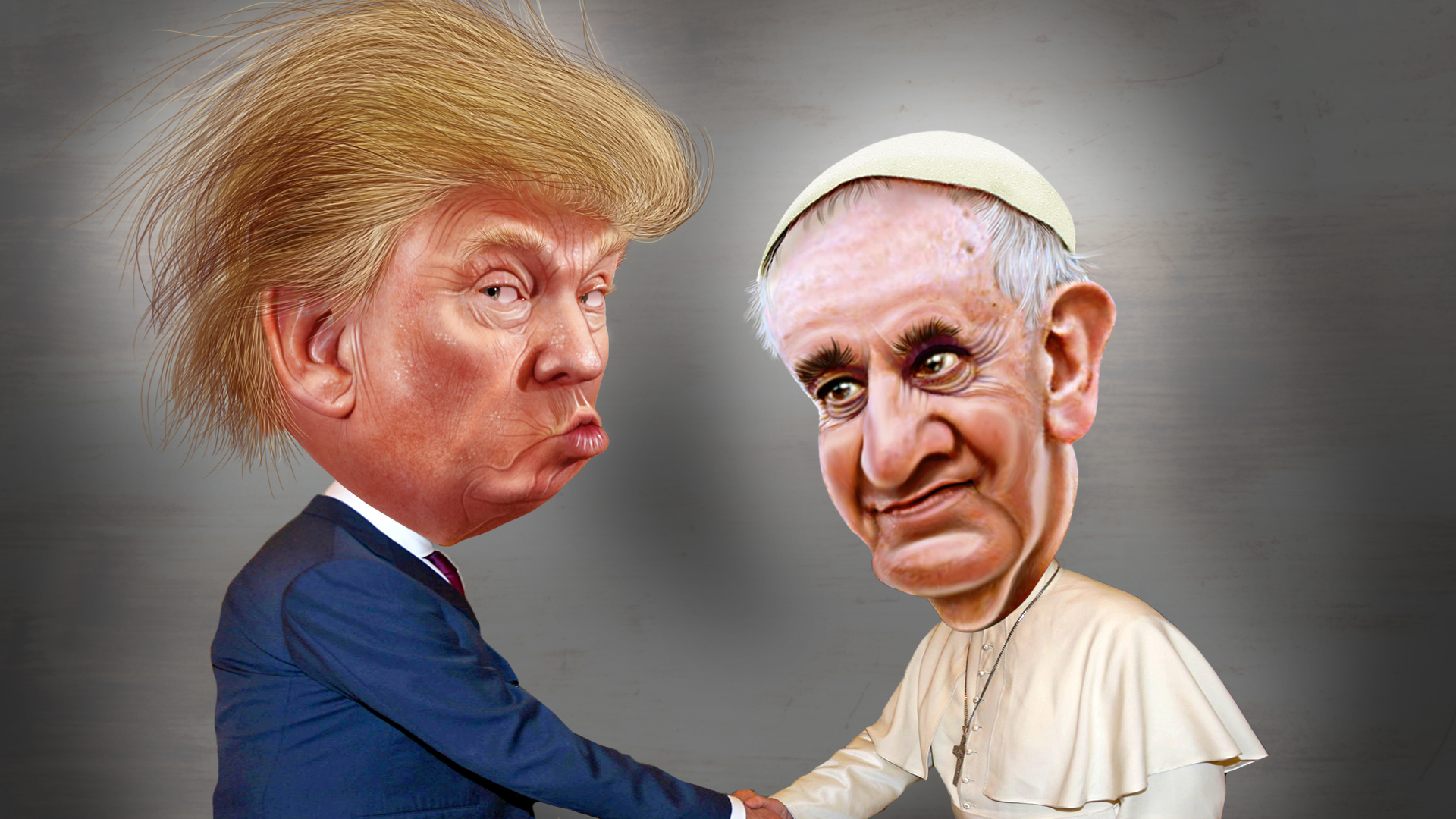
"Pope Francis shocks world, endorses Donald Trump for president"

===== #FakeNews =====
While "fake news" or politically motivated disinformation (PMD) is not a new occurrence, the sentiment and spread of distrust of news coverage has become more notable since the 2016 U.S. elections cycle. The hashtag, #FakeNews, gained major popularity in 2016 when Donald Trump claimed that the negative press coverage he received was due to the spread of false stories. Since the emergence of this hashtag, there has been an increase in policy-related bills and laws regarding the proliferation of inaccurate information globally, which further politicized the issue and raised concerns of impending censorship. The emergence of social media has allowed for "fake news" to spread much quicker than regular news and information, pushing technology companies to take a more active role in detecting and removing "fake news".

An example of #FakeNews comes from a website named WTOF 5 News. The headline reads: "Pope Francis shocks world, endorses Donald Trump for president". With the help from Facebook, this fake news article received over 960,000 engagements from the popular social media site, making it one of the post popular fake news articles of 2016.

===== #ProtectOurWinters =====
Protect Our Winters is a movement and a nonprofit organization started by snowboarder, Jeremy Jones and other winter sport athletes to raise awareness about global warming and climate change. The movement started in 2016 as a response to it being one of the hottest years. The movement demonstrates the effects of global warming with data about the winter sports industry and rise in carbon dioxide percentage. Protect Our Winters or POW calls for people to not only be aware of the effects global warming but to take action by volunteering, voting for legislature or donating to the cause.

===== #FreeBritney =====
In April 2019, the Britney Spears fan podcast Britney's Gram uncovered the first alleged abuses within her conservatorship arrangement and created the hashtag #FreeBritney. The term itself had been in use by certain fans since 2008. Alongside advocating for the termination and investigation of Spears's conservatorship, the hashtag and accompanying social movement have been used to raise awareness of guardianship and conservatorship abuse across the United States. The hashtag has led to legislative change in California surrounding legal procedures within conservatorship, and has inspired various bipartisan inquiries of guardianship and conservatorship law in Congress.

===== #PublishingPaidMe =====
Created in 2020 by L.L. McKinney, this hashtag was used by authors to discuss the pay differences received by publishers for black and non-black authors.

===== #freeschlep =====
The hashtag "#freeschlep" became popular on Twitter for several days, with users praising Schlep's actions and criticising Roblox for banning Schlep due to him being a vilgilante.

==== International origin ====
===== #BringBackOurGirls =====
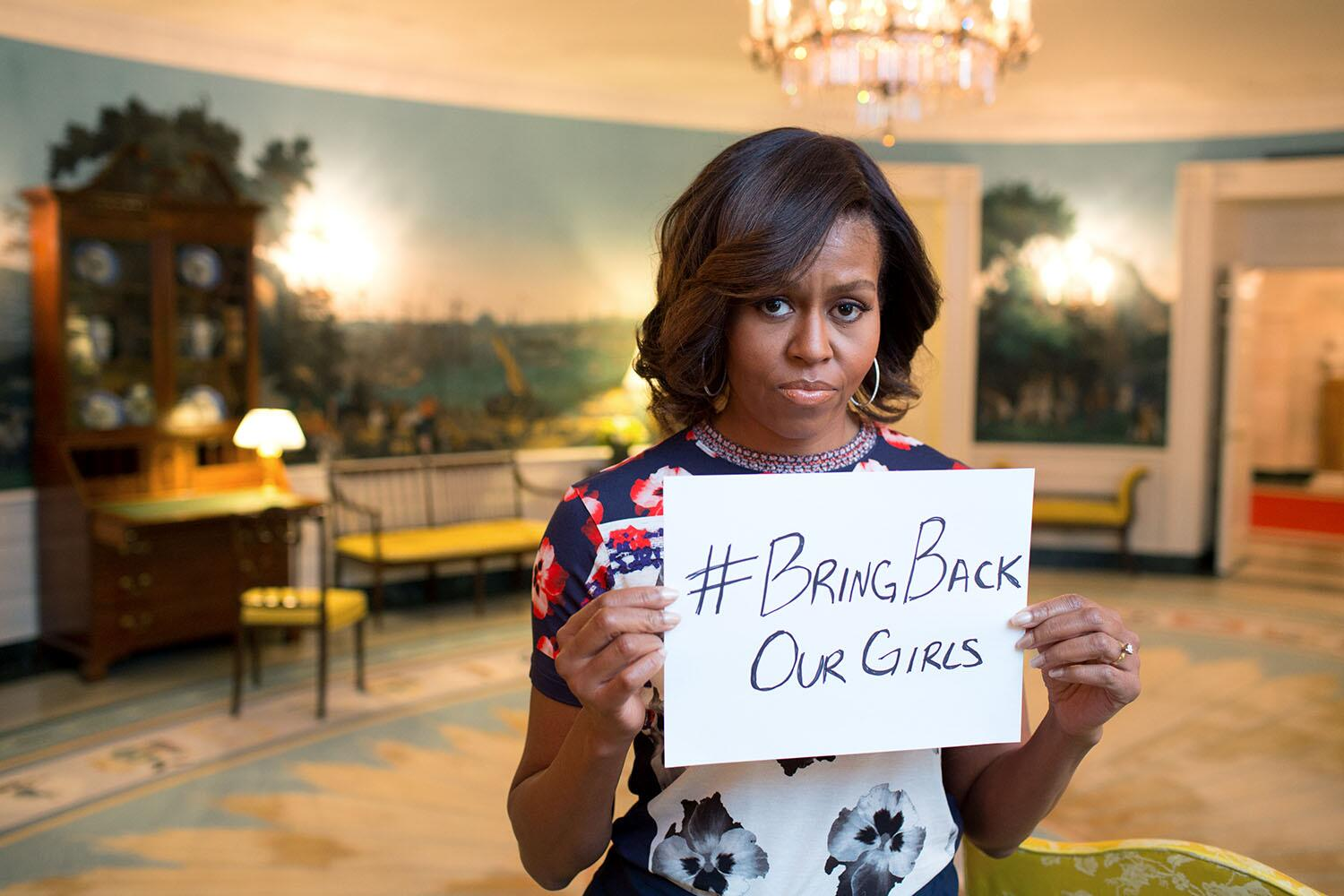
First Lady Michelle Obama initiated the #BringBackOurGirls hashtag.

Boko Haram kidnapped over 200 schoolgirls from Chibok, Nigeria in May 2014, refusing to return the girls. The hashtag #BringBackOurGirls was created and used in hopes of keeping the story in the news and bringing international attention to it. The hashtag was first used by a corporate lawyer named Ibrahim Abdullahi, and has also been used by the likes of First Lady Michelle Obama, who used it to raise awareness for the kidnapped girls. The hashtag in itself has received 2 million retweets.

===== #AmINext =====
In the Fall of 2014, a Canadian Inuk woman named Holly Jarrett created the #AmINext hashtag campaign to raise awareness about the Canadian Government's lack of response to the high rate of violence against Indigenous women. The campaign involves people taking photos of themselves with signs holding "#AmINext" and posting it to social media. The campaign was meant to encourage a national conversation about the invisibility and vulnerability of the female Indigenous demographic and call attention to the minimal efforts of the Government in investigating the murders and disappearances. Holly was personally inspired to carry out the campaign as her cousin, Loretta Saunders, an Inuk woman from Labrador, went missing and was ultimately found dead on the side of a Canadian highway. After the campaign, the government filed a national DNA missing person's index and introduced 30 safety initiatives to help indigenous women.

===== #PrayforParis =====
The epicenter of Paris encountered unexpected terrorist attacks, leading to worldwide efforts to spread awareness about this incident. During this event, terrorists were wearing suicide belts and the subsequent violence was shocking. The terrorists were planning to enter the stadium along with other people. Despite the person being prevented from entering, it demonstrated the severity of how people are risking their own lives, indirectly affecting others. Following the incident, more than 70 million people began to share this news on various social media platforms in order to reach a broader audience. For example, Facebook enabled users to change their profile picture to a transparent overlay of the French flag to indicate support to the victims. Twitter was also utilized. However, rather than creating a transparent overlay on a Twitter's user profile, a hashtag was created to emphasize support. This simple hashtag of #PrayforParis allowed users to spread support so that audiences were not only informed about the event, but could also click on a hyperlink to learn more about the cause and other user's perspectives. Although social media platforms were useful in spreading awareness, the effect of younger individuals were just as notable. For example, a young child drew his thoughts on paper, including the message: "Shot after shot, bang after bang, wasting innocent lives!"

===== #flygskam =====
Flygskam is a Swedish word that literally translates as "flight shame". It is the name of an anti-flying movement that originated in Sweden last year, which encourages people to stop taking flights to lower carbon emissions. The idea was originally championed by Olympic athlete Bjorn Ferry and gained momentum after teenage activist Greta Thunberg's mother, the opera singer Malena Ernman, publicly announced she would stop flying, with various Swedish celebrities following suit. Thunberg herself traveled largely by train during her recent two-week tour of Europe. The activism has seen real results in Sweden as the sales of airline ticket sales declined by 4% in January 2020 due to the increasing public awareness to the carbon footprint resulted by commercial flights.

===== #CoronaVirus =====
#Coronavirus, #COVID-19, and #Covid_19 represent a few of the most common hashtags referring to Coronavirus 2019 that started in Wuhan, China. The Hashtag has increased rapidly with the World Health Organization's (WHO) declaration of the virus as pandemic on 11 March 2020. Looking at the trajectory of this Hashtag on Twitter from Symplur, it shows a notable decrease in the number of Hashtags from 50763 on 13 April 2020 to 35795 on 18 April 2020.

=== Political ===
==== United States origin ====
===== #HumanizeTheBadge =====
Prior to 2020 #humanizethebadge was primarily circulating on Twitter and Facebook by organizations promoting stronger bonds between law enforcement and the communities they serve, such as the nonprofit group Humanizing the Badge. This need for betterment was due to police brutality killing George Floyd on May 5, 2020. This ignited the public's want for change and placed the Black Lives Matter protests at the forefront of the media. Behind the protest lines, the hashtag humanizing the badge popularized. The purpose of #humanizethebadge was for officers and officers' loved ones, to show their communities the person behind the police uniform. #humanizethebadge is mostly seen on TikTok with over 2 billion posts including the hashtag. These posts strive to humanize officers to reveal them as more relatable and trustworthy. This relatability is an attempt to bring them closer to the citizens and communities they serve. Through the use of TikTok officers are able to reach a wider audience. TikTok allows creators to jump from audience to audience and trend to trend. These videos receive tens of millions of views promoting bureaucratic propaganda due to officers' supporting the appearance of institutional legitimacy. Within the videos they are able to promote themselves as your average, relatable human, while being in uniform, thus associating themselves with the police department. Creating this link humanizes law enforcement as a whole, in an attempt to show police as the 'good guy'.

However, this hashtag is not universally promoted by police officers. A former police officer and current entrepreneur Autumn Clifford believe being a police officer is a great responsibility that needs to be represented by leaders. She notes historically society has never loved law enforcement, and citizens do not like being told what to do. Thus they need leaders to guide them in a positive direction. Civilians need to see police as leaders within their own communities. Clifford suggests this can be achieved by officers having real and honest conversations with civilians, and by going out of their way to relate to citizens. This can lead to a greater respect for law enforcement. She provides an example of being called to a troubled teen's group home and ending the encounter with a dance battle. This encounter changed the teen's perspective on her, and referred to her as the 'cool cop' for the rest of her time on the job. This one simple interaction humanized her to the group of teens.

===== #NODAPL =====
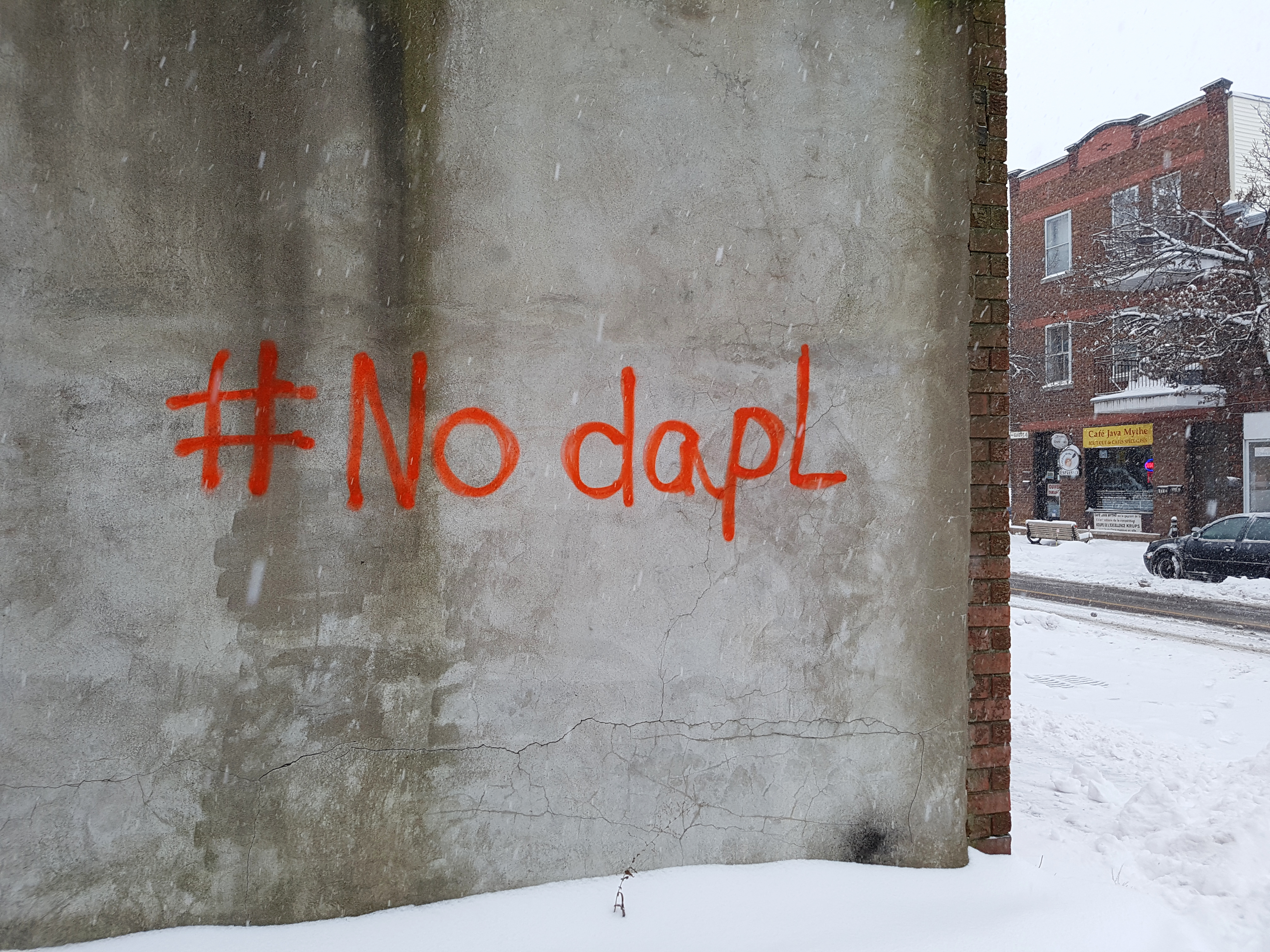
The #noDAPL hashtag used in real life, outside social media.

#NODAPL, also referred to as the Dakota Access Pipeline protests, is a Twitter hashtag and social media campaign for the struggle against the proposed and partially built Dakota Access Pipeline. The role social media played in this movement is so substantial that the movement itself is now often referred to by its hashtag: #NoDAPL. The hashtag reflected a grassroots campaign that began in early 2016 in reaction to the approved construction of the Dakota Access Pipeline in the northern United States. The Standing Rock Sioux and allied organizations took legal action aimed at stopping construction of the project, while youth from the reservation began a social media campaign which gradually evolved into a larger movement with dozens of associated hashtags. The campaign aimed to raise awareness on the threat of the pipeline on the sacred burial grounds as well as the quality of water in the area. In June 2021, a federal judge struck down the Standing Rock Sioux Tribe's lawsuit, but left the option of reopening the case should any prior orders be violated.

===== #NotOneMore =====
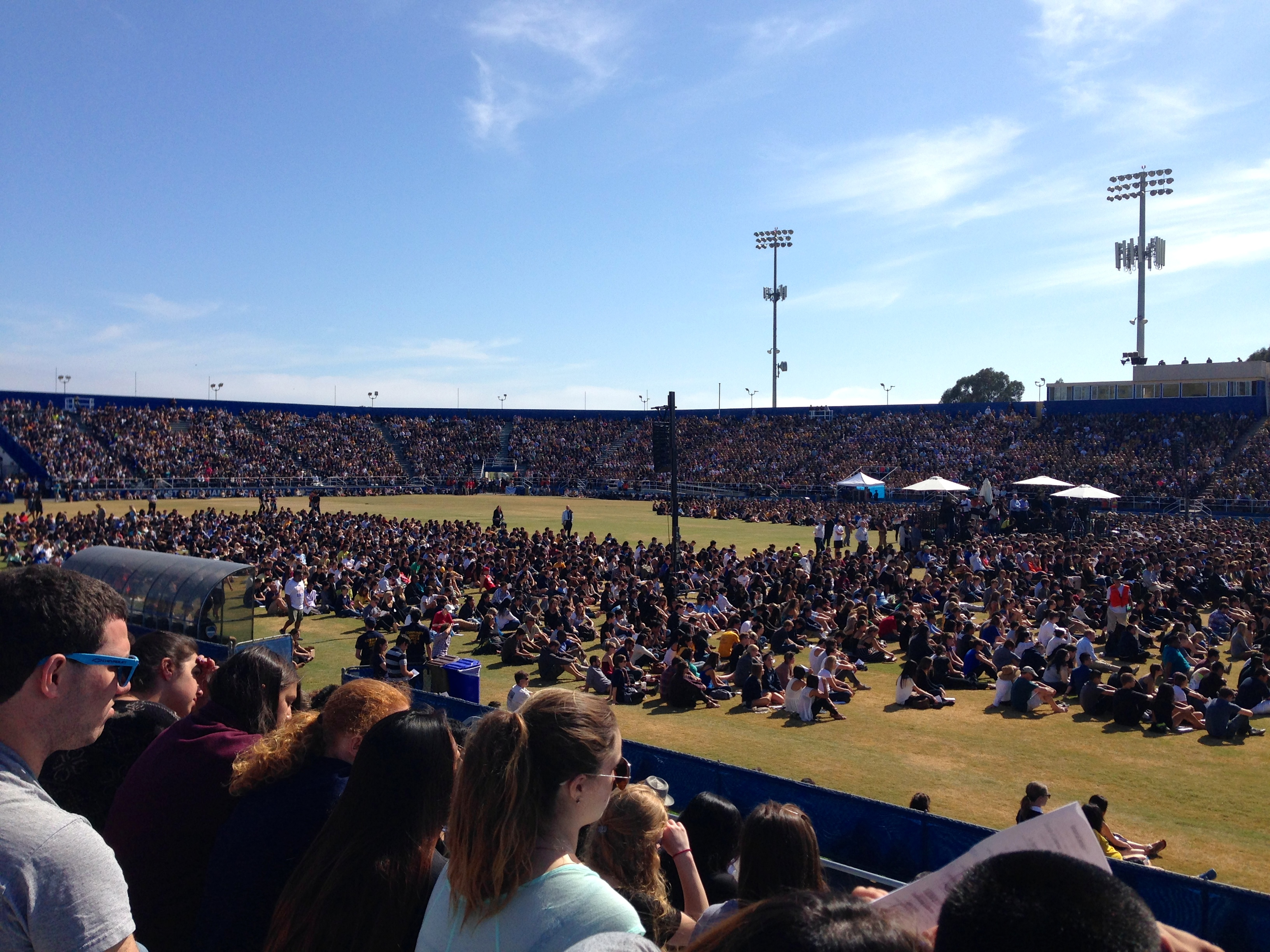
A memorial service held at Harder Stadium after the Isla Vista killings

The hashtag #NotOneMore developed shortly after the May 23, 2014, shooting in Isla Vista, Santa Barbara, California. During this incident, six students attending the University of California, Santa Barbara, lost their lives. Richard Martinez, the father of one of the victims, quickly spoke out about gun control, calling for stricter gun control during memorial ceremonies and rallies, chanting "Not One More!" The phrase became a hashtag on social media afterwards. Richard also worked with Everytown's digital team to create a tool to allow participants to send postcards to their senators, congressional representatives, and governor containing the phrase "Not One More".

===== #MarchforOurLives =====
The March for Our Lives protest began after the Marjory Stoneman Douglas High School shooting in Parkland, Florida on February 14, 2018. In response to a surge of gun violence in schools and the 17 dead after the Parkland shooting, people began to rally around the hashtag #neveragain. The hashtag, indicative of the larger movement against gun violence, spread across social networks and went viral in early 2018.

Additionally, the movement organized walkouts in remembrance of the lives lost due to gun violence. In March 2018, hundreds of marches were organized across the country in support of stricter gun laws, many of which were met with resistance from anti-protesters. Since February 2018 there have been 123 laws passed nationwide at the state-level to address concerns of gun control.

On February 17, 2018, a Facebook page was started by students to encourage their participation in the movement; and as of April 2019 the page has been liked by more than 280,000 individuals and has a following of more than 300,000. The Instagram page @marchforourlives is live and as of April 2019 has over 200 posts and just over 360,000 followers.

===== #EndFathersDay =====
In 2014, some editors spoofed being black feminists, spreading the meme, #EndFathersDay. Fox News picked the hoax to denounce. After much research, the fake accounts were outed.

===== #NoBanNoWall =====
#NoBanNoWall is a hashtag and social media campaign created in response to Donald Trump's purported "Muslim ban" and 2016 presidential campaign promises to build a physical wall on the US-Mexico border. In 2017, President Donald Trump issued multiple executive orders threatening to break up families and turn away refugees. Saki Barzinji and Imraan Siddiqi started #NoBanNoWall in an effort to rally Muslim, Latino, and other communities to stand up against xenophobic immigration policies. On January 25, 2017, protestors gathered at Washington Square Park and chanted, "No ban; no wall", which inspired the Twitter hashtag #NoBanNoWall to protest Trump's travel ban. The impact of the movement was seen in airports immediately after the hashtag started trending. A judge in New York accepted a request from the ACLU to provide a warrant blocking deportation in airports. The movement became a platform for people to share stories of them or their families immigrating to the US, and worked to combat the growing public fear of certain foreigners.

===== #FireDrillFridays =====
Inspired by Greta Thunberg and started by Greenpeace and Jane Fonda, #FireDrillFridays brings awareness to the climate change crisis. Calling for a Green New Deal in the United States government, the movement organized protests on the Capitol every Friday beginning in October 2019. The campaign also advocates for complete stoppage of new fossil fuel projects and to phase out existing fossil fuel projects. #FireDrillFridays gained popularity with celebrity arrests. Due to the COVID-19 pandemic, Fonda moved #FireDrillFridays online to continue rallying for government action.

===== #WalkAway =====
The #WalkAway campaign is a social media campaign that was launched ahead of the United States 2018 mid-term elections with the stated purpose of encouraging voters to leave the Democratic Party. The campaign, which also organized events to support Donald Trump, was noted and criticized for its astroturfing methods and the claim that there was a popular movement of people leaving the party.

==== International origin ====
===== #ArabSpring =====
#ArabSpring spread across social media early 2011, spreading awareness of the anti-government protest in the North Africa and the Middle East. The #ArabSpring is Twitter hashtag used in anti-government protests across the Middle East in 2010.

===== #Oromoprotests =====
In 2014, IOYA (The International Oromo Youth Association) created the #Oromoprotests hashtag to bring awareness to Oromo student protests against the Ethiopian government's plan to expand Addis Ababa and annex areas occupied by Oromo farmers and residents. The hashtag was utilized again starting in late November/December 2015 to bring attention to renewed Oromo protests and the Ethiopian government's violent crackdown on students, journalists and musicians. While the Oromo held protests before, this was the first time the Oromo could be united across the country by using new social media platforms.

===== #Sosblakaustralia =====
In March 2015, an activism campaign took hold in Australia. #Sosblakaustralia was a campaign started in a small aboriginal town in Western Australia. This campaign was to combat an initiative that would close down 150 rural aboriginal communities. Though this movement started in a rural community of 200 #Sosblakaustralia with poor Internet connection, it eventually spread to thousands of followers including Australian celebrities such as Hugh Jackman, this caused the movement to expand as far as London. In 18 days this movement had over 50,000 followers and had reached over 1,000,000 people worldwide.

===== #IdleNoMore =====
In the Winter of 2012–2013, in Canada, a campaign was started by Canadian indigenous activists using #IdleNoMore in order to combat future legislation that would threaten indigenous land and water. The movement has continued to grow and unify native communities and the hashtag has made expansion possible. Idle No More started in Canada it has spread to native people around the world including the United States and Australia where indigenous people face similar issues. The use of the hashtag and social media has been instrumental in spreading Idle No More's message to indigenous people around the world giving those who otherwise would be voiceless a means to participate in activism.

===== #UmbrellaRevolution =====
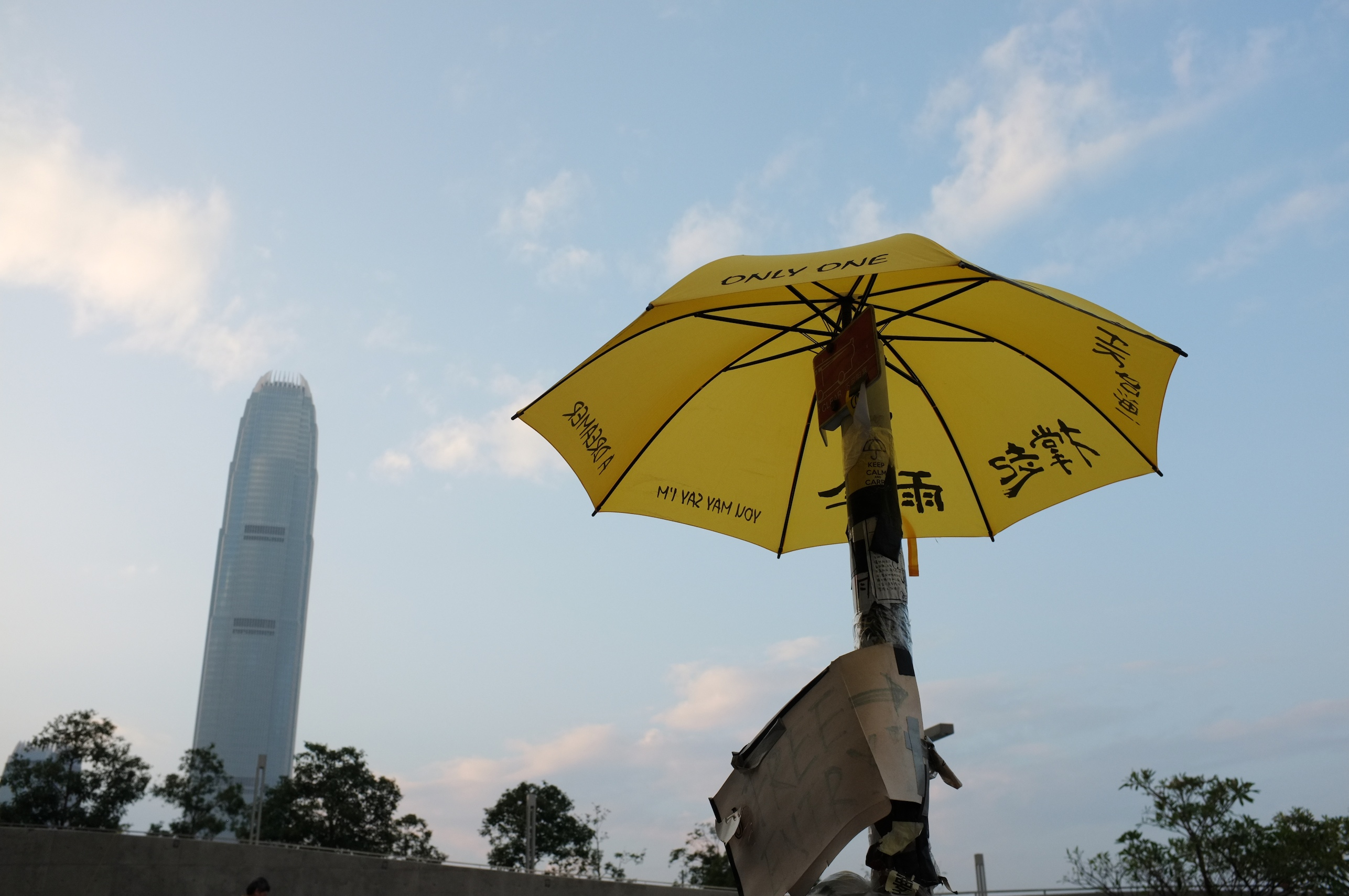
A sign of the Umbrella Revolution protest in Hong Kong

The response of the umbrella became a symbol in Admiralty, Mong Kok and Causeway Bay districts, Hong Kong to protest about the free election systems in China. The protestors had been camped on the streets and the public parks. The umbrella was used to protect the protesters in defence of the democratic political process in 2014 when police used tear gas in attempts to get them to leave. "Umbrella Revolution" and "Umbrella Movement" have been used to identify this event through British media outlet BBC. through social network services such as Twitter and Instagram made the events in Hong Kong reach many other people not directly involved with the protest with the use of #UmbrellaRevolution and created a worldwide social awareness to how Hong Kong was responding to support of the democratic process.

===== #PutItToThePeople =====
The United Kingdom-based People's Vote campaign group was launched in April 2018 and calls for a confirmatory public vote on the final Brexit deal between the United Kingdom and the European Union and uses #PutItToThePeople as its activism hashtag.

===== Other examples =====
In September 2014, The Hokkolorob Movement (Let The Voice Raise Movement) started. It is a series of protests initiated by the students of Jadavpur University in Kolkata, India that began on September 3, 2014. The term "hok kolorob" ("make some noise") was first used as a hashtag on Facebook.

===== #2019GantiPresiden =====
In 2018, Indonesian politician Mardani Ali Sera introduced #2019GantiPresiden (Replace the President in 2019), in which he spreads this hashtag through social media to spread public awareness and pushing Indonesian netizens to elect another president in 2019 instead of Jokowi. Mardani's statement was reinforced by the statement of the PKS president, Sohibul Iman. Previously, a movement with the same name was also launched by Mardani on his personal Twitter account on March 27, 2018. According to Mardani in a tweet, the hashtag was the antithesis of Joko Widodo's campaign of supporters on social media.

Many social media accounts began to retweet the hashtag. Within a short period of time, T-shirts were produced with the hashtag, with Mardani denying that the movement is a political campaign due to a lack of a supported replacement. The movement garnered significant support from other opposition politicians, including Amien Rais (PAN) and Yusril Ihza Mahendra (PBB). Reasons cited include pressure on Islamic organizations, influx of immigrant workers (mainly from China) due to relaxation of immigration rules and economic issues such as a lack of available jobs and increased prices of necessities.

Numerous rallies and supports for #2019GantiPresiden was spread across the country, such as in Jakarta, Surakarta, and Jogjakarta. Even Ahmad Syaikhu and Sudrajat tell if they won the 2018 West Java gubernatorial election, they will support 2019 Ganti Presiden movement.

However, the movement was flopped after President Joko Widodo won the election twice.

=== Trends ===
==== United States origin ====
===== #icebucketchallenge and #ALS =====
UC Berkeley's ex-chancellor Nicholas Dirks participates in the ALS Ice Bucket Challenge.

The #icebucketchallenge is an act where a bucket of ice water is dumped over the head of an individual and documented by videos or pictures, and a "challenge" is issued to another person (or persons) to do the same. The "challenged" individual then either has to respond by dumping ice water on their head, or donate money to a Motor neuron disease or amyotrophic lateral sclerosis (ALS, also referred to as Lou Gehrig's disease) charity. However, doing both is also an option. The encouragement of the challenge is to circulate the video or photo on social media websites and applications with their community, friends, and family to show their support in raising awareness of ALS/MND. The involvement of #icebucketchallenge with the global audience of social media generated so much awareness and support that in early August 2014, the national ALS charity foundation president Barbara Newhouse, directly attributed the movement to a fundraising "surge" of $168,000 that accumulated in just a week. That figure contrasted with the $14,000 raised in the same time the year prior prompted the CEO and her 38 years in the industry to view the difference in support as "crazy". A month after the August 2014 fundraising week the number of videos that were directly associated with the #icebucketchallenge was tallied on the Facebook website from June 1 to September 1 at 17 million, according to the Facebook Newsroom. As the videos continued to climb, so did the challenges. Eventually, public figures such as James Franco, Charlie Rose, and even former president George W. Bush took an activist role in raising money for research and awareness of the ALS disease.

==== International origin ====
===== #Hallyu =====
The Hallyu Wave, which literally translates to "flow of Korea" (or more commonly known as the Korean Wave) represents the social movement in connection to South Korean culture and entertainment. Economically, Hallyu is tremendously profitable, attracting millions of tourists and fans per year and produces many forms of entertainment, such as Korean pop music and television drama series, ultimately generating billions of US dollars in annual revenue which further strengthens its economic prosperity and stability. Furthermore, being a powerful social movement in its own right, Hallyu holds considerable influence in politics as well. The ninth president of South Korea, Roh Moo-hyun, once stated that Hallyu can be used to improve or repair the tense relations between the Koreas. Still, North Korea does not have its own rendition of Hallyu and even rejects it; for example, when Psy's "Gangnam Style" was released in 2012, North Korea viewed the song with contempt because while South Korea was attracting positive attention, it was also undermining the impoverished conditions of North Korea at the same time.

=== LGBT rights ===
In 2014, protests of the then-recently enacted anti-gay laws included targeting the corporate sponsors for the 2014 Winter Olympics in Sochi Russia. Among the sponsors was McDonald's, whose marketing included the hashtag #CheersToSochi, which was hijacked by the queer activist group Queer Nation.

In June 2015, The United States Supreme Court ruled in favor of same-sex marriage nationwide. This led to the creation of the hashtag #lovewins. This hashtag earned over 4.5 billion impressions on Twitter. President Barack Obama joined in and tweeted using the hashtag.

==== United States origin ====
===== #Girlslikeus =====
Started by Janet Mock in 2012. This hashtag was used to support Jenna Talackova during the Miss Universe pageant.

===== #OwnVoices =====
This hashtag is used to showcase authors from marginalized or underrepresented groups who write characters from those same groups of people. This hashtag represents stories being told by people who have lived those experiences.

== Effectiveness ==
Critics have often labeled hashtag activism as a form of slacktivism. A term used to describe minimal online engagement with political or social issues, such as posting hashtags, liking or sharing content without deeper involvement. These critics argue that such digital gestures offer superficial support, resulting in limited real world impact. The ease of participating has raised concerns about overuse and public fatigue, as some fear it may encourage a sense of symbolic involvement rather than genuine action Furthermore, some argue that this passive approach lacks the intensity and commitment seen in earlier social movements.

Another critique is that online movements are sometimes initiated by more privileged individuals, rather than those directly affected by the issues being addressed. Notable critics including former Alaska governor Sarah Palin, journalist Malcolm Gladwell, and writer Teju Cole, have argued that hashtag activism promotes lazy, ineffective participation with little capacity to generate meaningful change.

Despite these criticisms, supporters view hashtag activism as a powerful tool for raising awareness, sharing personal stories, and fostering solidarity. Hashtags enable users to connect and mobilize without being physically present, making activism more accessible. Because using hashtag requires minimal effort, more people can join conversations, helping to amplify marginalized voices and personal narratives. Campaigns like #MeToo and #BlackLivesMatter have allowed users to validate shared experiences, expand public discourse, and deepen understanding through multiple perspectives.

Supporters such as Bev Goodman, who launched the #WhyIStayed movement about domestic violence, argue that hashtag activism can spark long term engagement and even influence policy. For example, in 2012, when the Susan G. Komen for the Cure foundation announced it would stop funding mammograms referrals through Planned Parenthood, widespread backlash online, including hashtags like, #standwithpp, and #singon; led the organization to reverse its decision within the same week. Although Planned Parenthood clinics do not perform any mammograms, they do provide referrals for the service. The rapid pace of social media allows organizations to gauge public response quickly, sometimes prompting them to reconsider quickly, sometimes prompting them to reconsider or revise their decision.

== See also ==
- Call-out culture
- Culture of fear
- Netizen
- Slacktivism
- Social desirability bias
- Social justice warrior
- Twitter diplomacy
- Virtue signaling
