= DeafTalent =

Social media hashtag

#DeafTalent is a hashtag used to highlight through social media the capabilities of the deaf and hard of hearing community. Prior to the hashtag's emergence, in the creative industry, hearing actors had been cast in deaf roles. The SAGE Deaf Studies Encyclopedia wrote, "In response to this, the social media hashtags #DeafTalent and #POCDeafTalent were created. The hashtags, while originally used to point out problematic portrayals of deaf characters and sign language in the media, are now also used to celebrate the wide breadth and multiplicity of deaf actors, artists, and other talent in the world."

== History ==
In the 2010s, #DeafTalent was initially used to protest the casting of hearing actors in deaf character roles in the films Avenged, Medeas, and Hush. Afterward, the hashtag's purpose evolved to recognize deaf actors and character roles. Supporters of the movement collectively prefer realistic portrayals of deaf people and characterizations developed by deaf script writers. Uses of the hashtag were tracked by filmmaker Jules Dameron, and actor Tyrone Giordano created a publicly-available database of talented deaf people. With Medeas, in 2015, the hashtag #DeafTalent trended for 49 days. The book Exploring Deafness wrote, "Many actors and activists [affirmed] support for spreading awareness about casting Deaf people in Deaf roles," and highlighted that the films Baby Driver and A Quiet Place that cast "authentic Deaf people in Deaf, signing roles has resulted in multiple awards and nominations". Deaf author Sara Novic said because the hashtag trended, a roundtable was hosted by the National Endowment for the Arts, where there was a conversation about "how to support deaf actors, writers, and artists". The history of #DeafTalent was presented in 2017 at the Deaf Rochester Film Festival, with its presenter describing its purpose:

It is a movement to make sure that all deaf and hard of hearing roles are given only to deaf and hard of hearing actors. It’s so important— if it isn’t enforced, then deaf and hard of hearing people will never truly have the opportunity to give themselves a voice in the entertainment industry. And how will we make a difference and grow as industry professionals if we aren’t involved in the first place?

— Deaf filmmaker Jules Dameron

The hashtag repeatedly became a viral phenomenon with the visibility of deaf roles such as Nyle DiMarco's participation in the reality television series America's Next Top Model and Dancing with the Stars, deaf actress Millicent Simmonds in the horror film A Quiet Place, deaf casting and production in the television series This Close, and Deaf West Theatre's revival of the play Spring Awakening. With Spring Awakening's premiere in 2015, The Atlantic reported, "A hashtag has emerged: #DeafTalent, proclaiming the importance and power of diversity in culture." When A Quiet Place premiered in 2018, Nikol Prieto, writing for Easterseals, called the film "another example of #DeafTalent, which is a movement that encourages Deaf actors to be cast for Deaf roles instead of hearing actors". Prieto added, "The #DeafTalent campaign is about encouraging movie and television producers to provide more opportunities for Deaf actors. This movement is not only about bringing awareness to hearing individuals, but also about creating diversity in film and a valid representation of Deaf culture."

== Trademark ==
Jade Bryan, a media consultant who says she originated the hashtag to draw attention to Deaf and hard-of-hearing members of the entertainment industry and to oppose the casting of hearing actors in deaf roles, registered "#DeafTalent" as a trademark for entertainment and education services. Alexandra J. Roberts, a professor of law and media, wrote that Bryan has sought to restrict others from using the phrase, including by publishing on her website a claim that any use of the hashtag requires a license and by sending messages to deaf community members demanding they stop. Bryan's trademark complaint also led to the suspension from Twitter of the UK advocacy group Deaf Talent Collective, which had helped many Deaf actors of color secure roles in mainstream film and television. Roberts observes that the uses Bryan contests are largely expressive and non-trademark in nature, and as such permissible as fair use. Roberts also notes that even commercial uses of marks similar to a registered mark can lawfully coexist with it where they do not create consumer confusion, a condition more likely to be met when both marks incorporate descriptive terms such as "Deaf talent".
