= Ele Não movement =

Protests against Jair Bolsonaro in 2018

#EleNão movement
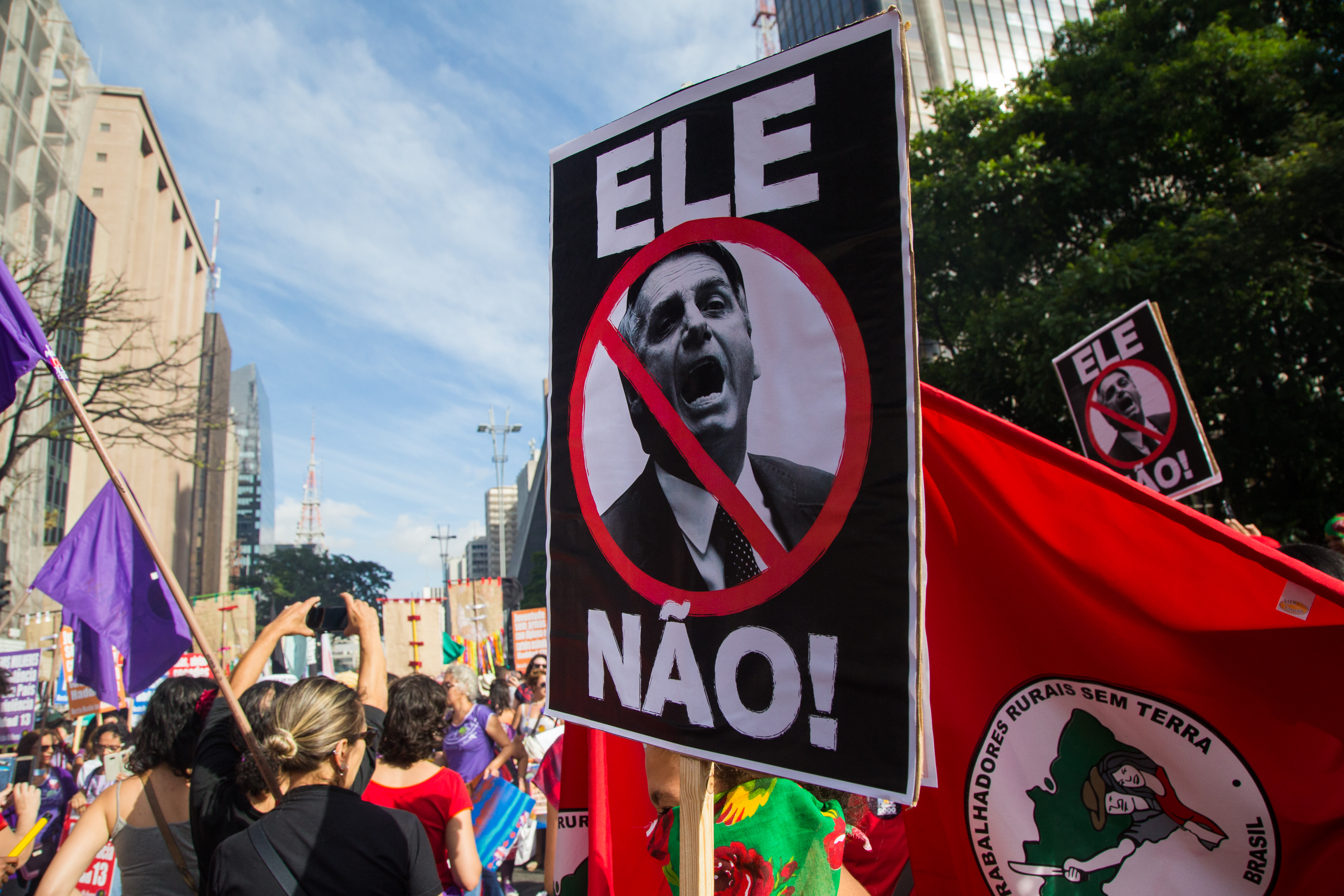
- Date: 29 September 2018; 7 years ago
- Location: Brazil, 114 cities in all states and in more than 50 countries.
- Caused by: Jair Bolsonaro 2018 presidential campaign

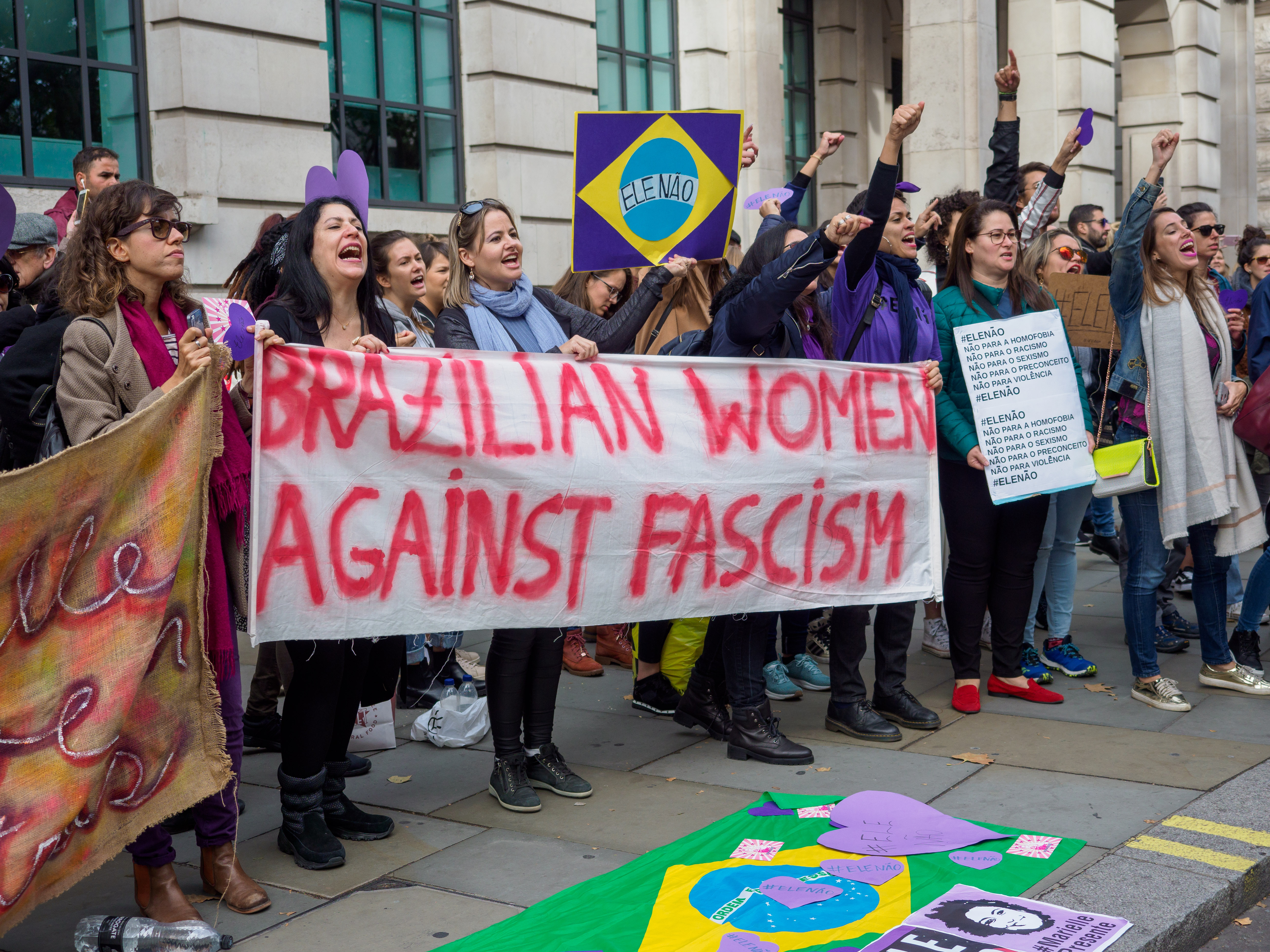
Protest against Bolsonaro in London.

The #EleNão ("ele não" is Portuguese for "not him"; Portuguese pronunciation: [ˈeli ˈnɐ̃w]) movement, also known as the protests against Jair Bolsonaro, were demonstrations led by women which took place in several regions of Brazil and, with less intensity, in other countries. The main goal was to protest against Jair Bolsonaro and his presidential campaign. The protests, which occurred on 29 September 2018, were the most numerous protests by women in Brazil and the largest popular concentration during the 2018 Brazilian general election.

The protests began to be organized in the Social networking services, mainly in the Facebook group "Mulheres contra Bolsonaro" (women against Bolsonaro). They were motivated by alleged sexist declarations of the candidate and accusations of threats to democracy. Social movements, feminist groups and political parties also supported and took part in the demonstrations. Cities in other countries, such as New York City, Barcelona, Berlin and Paris also held some smaller protests. Bolsonaro was elected with over 55% of the popular vote on 28 October 2018.

== Context ==
In an interview with Zero Hora in 2015, Bolsonaro argued that men and women should not receive the same salaries, because women get pregnant, adding that he believes federal law mandating paid maternity leave harms work productivity. Bolsonaro has denied saying that women should receive less than men; he claims it was statistical data by IBGE, a Brazilian research institute.

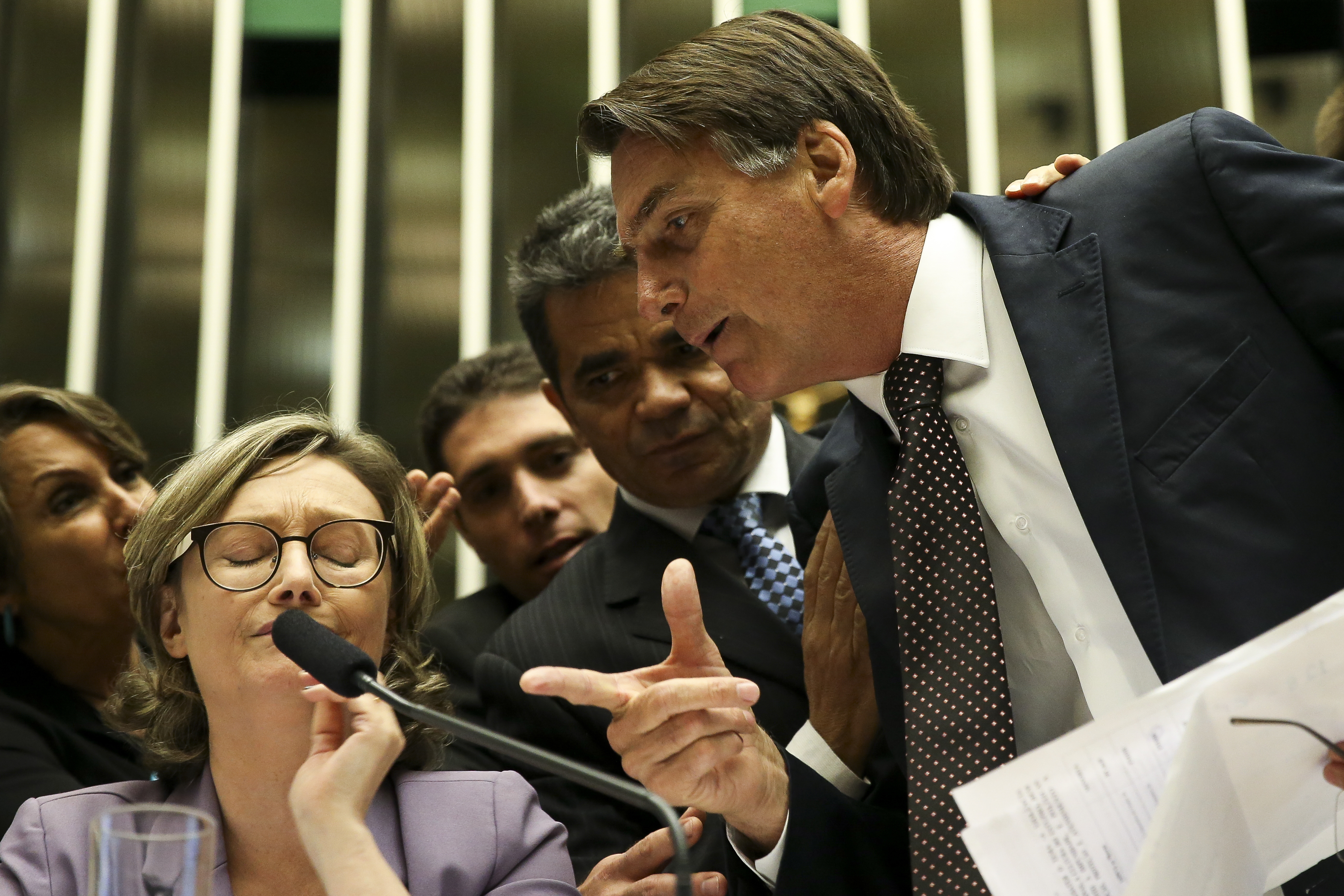
Bolsonaro arguing with Federal Deputy Maria do Rosário in the Chamber of Deputies, 14 September 2016

Bolsonaro already had four sons when his first daughter was born. In a public speech in April 2017, Bolsonaro said that he produced a daughter out of "a moment of weakness".

Bolsonaro provoked controversy for a series of remarks made to and about Federal Deputy and former Human Rights Minister Maria do Rosário. During a Congressional debate, Bolsonaro said that minors should be treated as adults if they commit heinous crimes such as murder or rape, to which Maria do Rosário responded by calling him a "rapist". Bolsonaro then stated that Congresswoman Rosário was "not worth raping; she is very ugly". The remarks drew considerable condemnation throughout Brazil. In the aftermath of these remarks, Bolsonaro was tried and convicted in a Federal court in September 2015 on counts of hedonic damages against Rosário. In June 2016, the Federal Supreme Court responded to a complaint filed by the Attorney General and decided to open two criminal actions against Bolsonaro. The Supreme Court ruled that he had potentially incited rape and defamed the honor of his fellow Deputy. He faced a penalty of up to 6 months of jail and a fine. Ultimately in August 2017, an appeal court upheld a lower court's verdict which found Bolsonaro guilty and sentenced him to pay a fine to Rosário of R$10,000 (roughly equivalent to US$2,500). This lawsuit was dismissed by the Supreme Federal Court, as Bolsonaro was inaugurated as president in 2019 and acquired immunity from prosecution.

== The hashtag ==
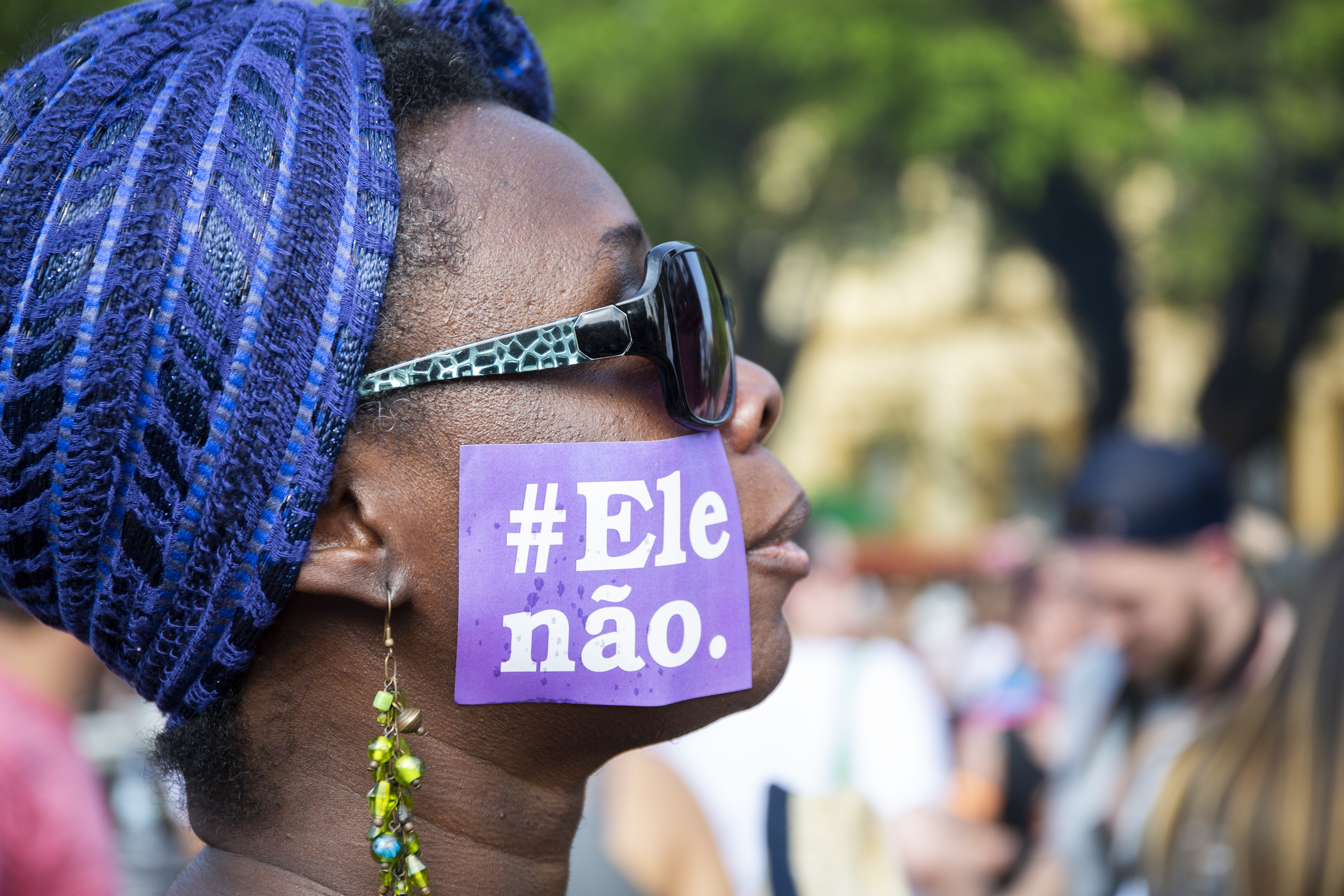
Protester in Porto Alegre with the hashtag

The hashtag #EleNão was created in Brazil on 12 September 2018, by the Facebook group "Mulheres Unidas Contra Bolsonaro" (women united against Bolsonaro). Within only 12 days, the hashtag was used more than 1.2 million times in tweets pro and against Bolsonaro. It was being used even among national and international celebrities. On September 16, the usage of the hashtag reached its peak soon after a hacker attack against the "Mulheres Unidas Contra Bolsonaro" Facebook group.

Madonna was one of the international celebrities who endorsed the movement. She posted in her Instagram, where she has more than 12.1 million followers, a picture in which she appears with her mouth sealed by a tape with the saying "freedom". Above, it reads in Portuguese "Ele não vai nos desvalorizar, ele não vai nos calar, ele não vai nos oprimir" (He won't devalue us, he won't silence us, he won't oppress us)".

== Gallery ==
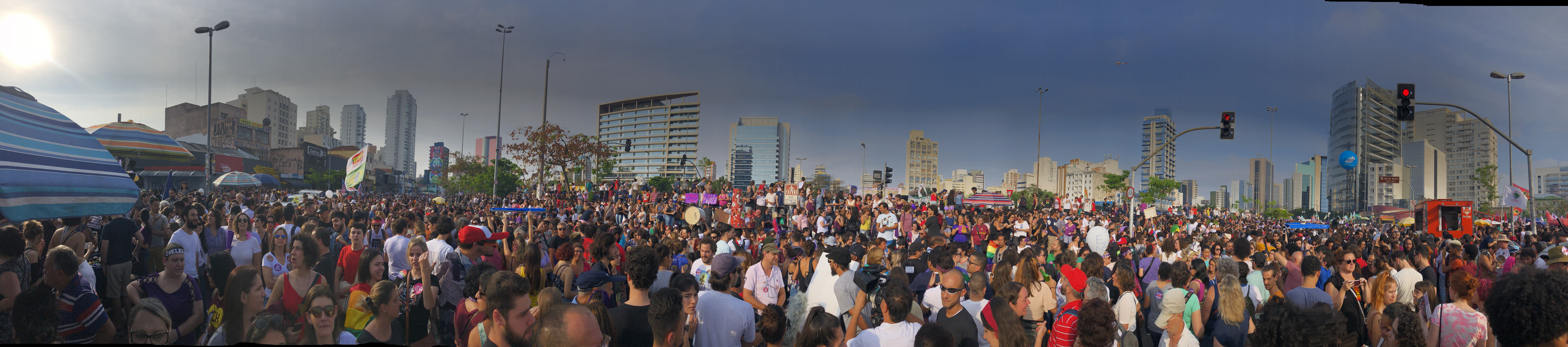
Protesters in Largo da Batata, São Paulo.

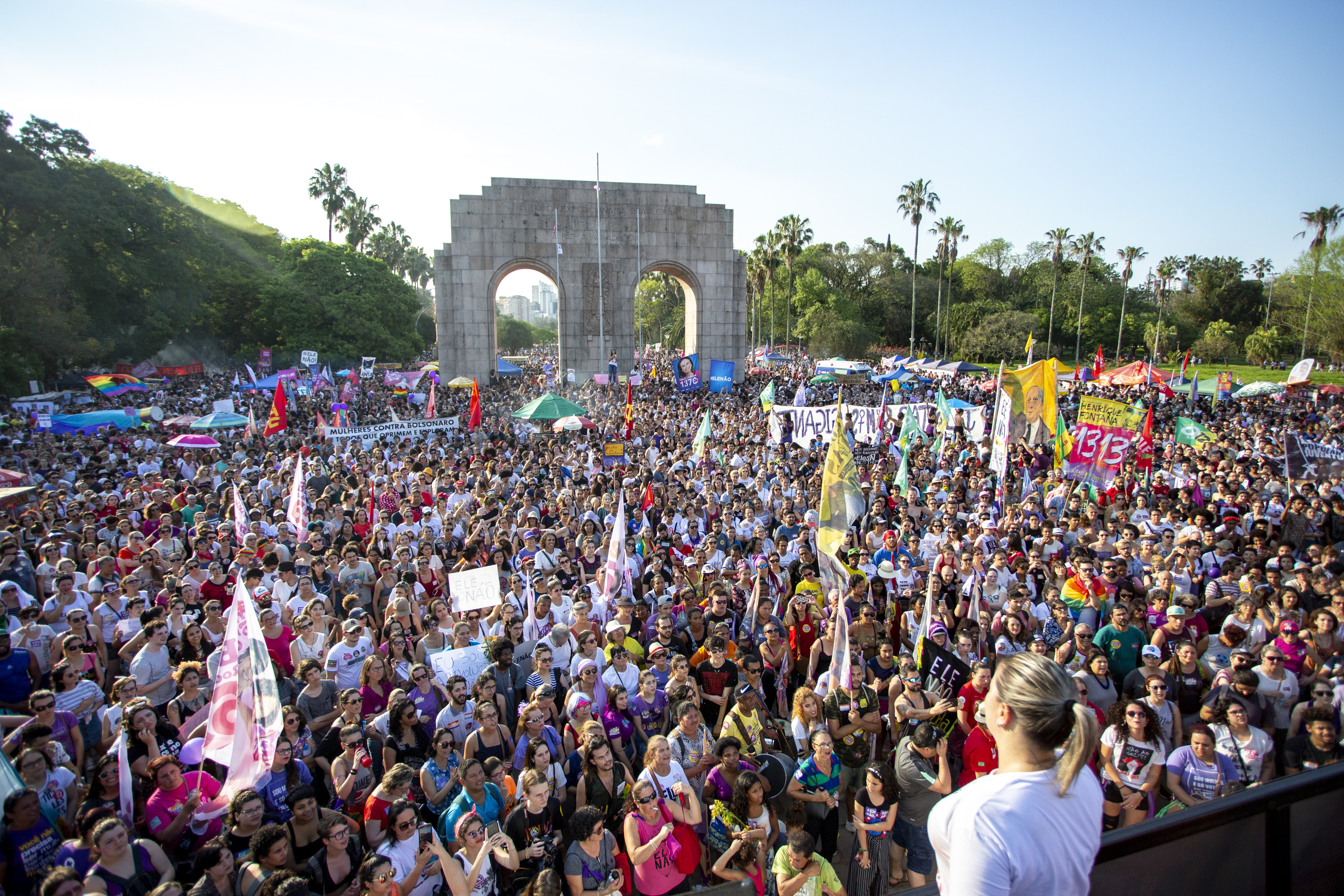
Protest in the city of Porto Alegre, Brazil.

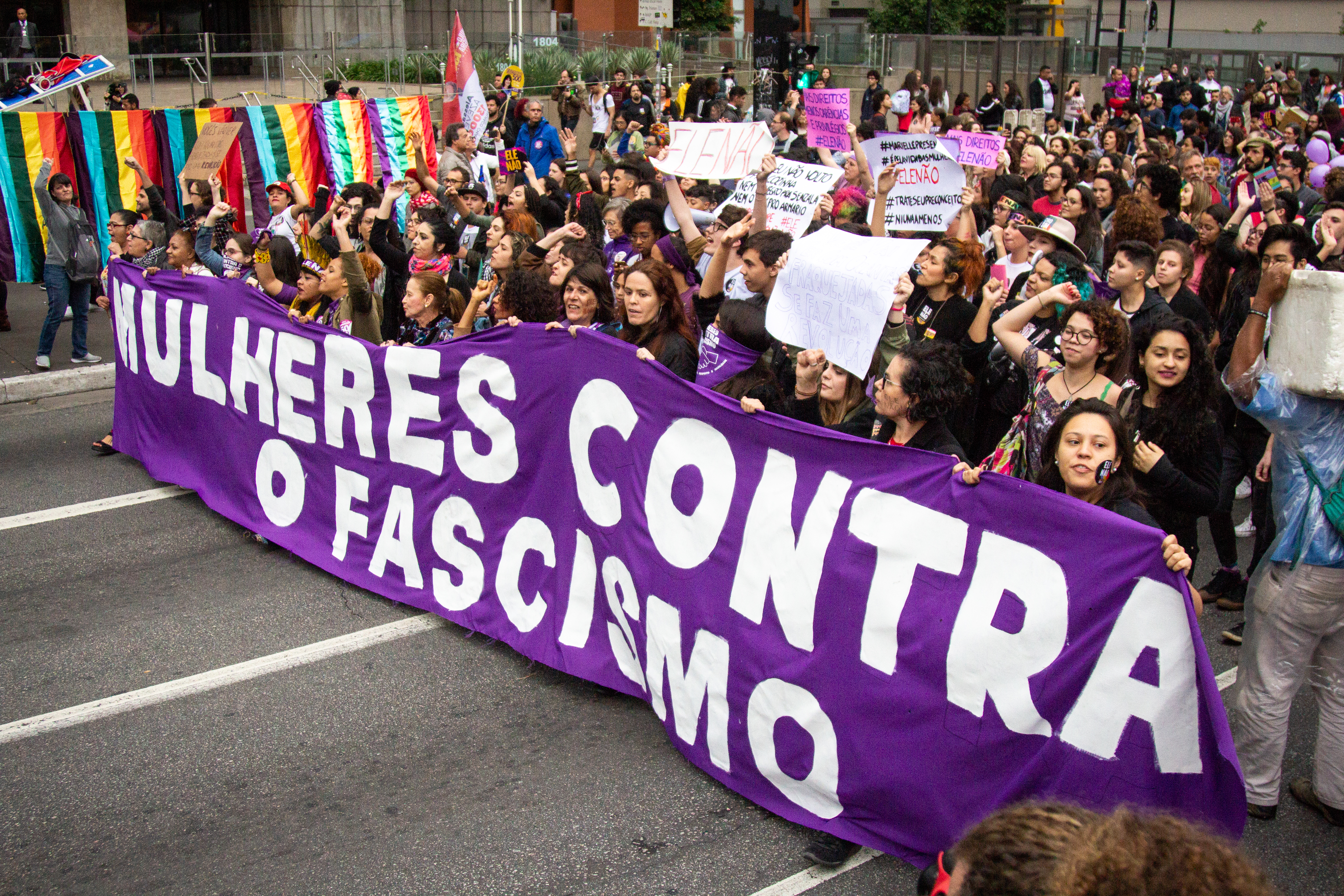
"Women against fascism" in Portuguese.

== Reaction ==
With the rise of the Ele Não movement, an opposite movement began to emerge, the Ele Sim movement, a movement in favour of Jair Bolsonaro. The Ele Sim movement preaches the opposite of the Ele Não movement, so it preaches the presidency of Bolsonaro, Conservatism, Nationalism and the political views of Jair Bolsonaro.

== See also ==
- Feminism in Brazil
- Ni una menos
- Me Too movement
- Hashtag activism
- Internet activism
- 2017 Women's March
- SlutWalk
- Marche mondiale des Femmes
- Presidency of Jair Bolsonaro
