= List of political parties in Croatia =

Croatia maintains a variety of political parties, some of which date back as far as 1841. Since 1989, Croatia has a multi-party system with numerous parties that must collaborate to form coalition governments.

There are a total of 160 active political parties in Croatia as of November 3, 2024. Since political parties were officially legalized in Croatia in 1990, a total of 409 have been registered to date, out of which 249 have been discontinued. The legal position, conditions, method and procedure for the establishment, registration and termination of political parties are determined by the Political Parties Act.

== Modern parties ==
=== Political parties with elected representation at the national level ===
Name	Abbr.	Leader	Ideology	Sabor	MEPs	Political position	European
Croatian Democratic Union; Hrvatska demokratska zajednica	HDZ	Andrej Plenković	Conservatism; Christian democracy	56 / 151	6 / 12	Centre-right	EPP
Social Democratic Party of Croatia; Socijaldemokratska partija Hrvatske	SDP	Siniša Hajdaš Dončić	Social democracy	34 / 151	4 / 12	Centre-left	PES
We Can! – Political Platform; Možemo! – politička platforma	Možemo!	Sandra Benčić; Tomislav Tomašević	Green politics; Eco-socialism; Progressivism	10 / 151	1 / 12	Centre-left to left-wing	EGP
Homeland Movement; Domovinski pokret	DP	Ivan Penava	Croatian nationalism; Right-wing populism; National conservatism; Social conservatism	8 / 151	0 / 12	Right-wing to far-right	—N/a
The Bridge; Most	Most	Nikola Grmoja	Fiscal conservatism; Social conservatism; Economic liberalism	7 / 151	0 / 12	Centre-right to right-wing	ECR
Home and National Rally; Dom i nacionalno okupljanje	DOMiNO	Mario Radić	Croatian nationalism; National conservatism	3 / 151	1 / 12	Right-wing	ECR
Independent Democratic Serb Party; Samostalna demokratska srpska stranka Самостална демократска српска странка	SDSS; СДСС	Milorad Pupovac	Serb interests; Social democracy; Anti-fascism	3 / 151	0 / 12	Centre-left	—N/a
Centre; Centar	Centar	Marijana Puljak	Social liberalism; Economic liberalism	2 / 151	0 / 12	Centre	ALDE
Istrian Democratic Assembly; Istarski demokratski sabor Dieta democratica istriana	IDS; DDI	Loris Peršurić	Istrian regionalism; Liberalism; Social liberalism	2 / 151	0 / 12	Centre to centre-left	ALDE
Croatian Social Liberal Party; Hrvatska socijalno-liberalna stranka	HSLS	Dario Hrebak	Conservative liberalism; Classical liberalism	2 / 151	0 / 12	Centre to centre-right	ALDE
Independent Platform of the North; Nezavisna platforma Sjever	NPS	Matija Posavec	Regionalism	2 / 151	0 / 12	Centre	—N/a
Drito; Drito		Marija Selak Raspudić	Centrism (self-proclaimed)	2 / 151	0 / 12	Centre	—N/a
Croatian Sovereignists; Hrvatski suverenisti	HS	Marijan Pavliček	Sovereigntism; Croatian nationalism; Christian right	1 / 151	0 / 12	Right-wing	ECR
Croatian Peasant Party; Hrvatska seljačka stranka	HSS	Darko Vuletić	Agrarianism; Liberalism; Green politics; Republicanism	1 / 151	0 / 12	Centre	—N/a
Croatian Demochristian Party; Hrvatska demokršćanska stranka	HDS	Goran Dodig	Christian democracy; Conservatism	1 / 151	0 / 12	Centre-right to right-wing	EPP
Dalija Orešković and People with a First and Last Name; Dalija Orešković i ljudi s imenom i prezimenom	DO i SIP	Dalija Orešković	Anti-corruption; Reformism	1 / 151	0 / 12	Centre to centre-left	—N/a
Croatian People's Party – Liberal Democrats; Hrvatska narodna stranka – Liberalni demokrati	HNS	Krunoslav Lukačić	Social liberalism	1 / 151	0 / 12	Centre	ALDE
Civic Liberal Alliance; Građansko-liberalni savez	GLAS	Stanko Borić	Liberalism; Social liberalism	1 / 151	0 / 12	Centre-left	ALDE
Croatian Party of Pensioners; Hrvatska stranka umirovljenika	HSU	Veselko Gabričević	Pensioners' interests; Single-issue politics	1 / 151	0 / 12	Centre to centre-left	—N/a
Law and Justice; Pravo i pravda	PiP	Mislav Kolakušić	Sovereigntism; Populism; Protectionism	1 / 151	0 / 12	Right-wing	—N/a

=== Political parties with previously elected representation at a national level ===
Name	Abbr.	Leader	Ideology	Political position	European	Elected representatives	Note
Alliance of Primorje-Gorski Kotar; Primorsko-goranski savez	PGS	Darijo Vasilić	Regionalism; Liberalism	Centre	—N/a	1992 (1 seat); 2000 (1 seat); 2003 (1 seat)	Active only in Primorje-Gorski Kotar County
Bloc for Croatia; Blok za Hrvatsku	BLOK	Zlatko Hasanbegović	Croatian nationalism; Right-wing populism; Social conservatism	Right-wing to far-right	—N/a	2020 (1 seat)	
Bandić Milan 365 – Labour and Solidarity Party; Bandić Milan 365 – Stranka rada i solidarnosti	BM 365	Slavko Kojić	Populism	Big tent	—N/a	2015 (2 seats); 2016 (1 seat)	In bankruptcy
Croatian Civic Party; Hrvatska građanska stranka	HGS	Željko Kerum	Right-wing populism	Right-wing	—N/a	2011 (2 seats)	Active only in Split-Dalmatia County
Croatian Democratic Alliance of Slavonia and Baranja; Hrvatski demokratski savez Slavonije i Baranje	HDSSB	Branimir Glavaš	Slavonian regionalism; National conservatism	Centre-right	—N/a	2007 (3 seats); 2011 (6 seats); 2015 (2 seats); 2016 (1 seat)	Active only in the region of Slavonija
Croatian Labourists – Labour Party; Hrvatski laburisti – Stranka rada	Laburisti	David Bregovac	Social democracy; Left-wing populism; Labourism	Centre-left	—N/a	2011 (6 seats); 2013 EP (1 seat); 2015 (3 seats)	
Croatian Party of Rights; Hrvatska stranka prava	HSP	Marina Logarušić	Croatian ultranationalism; National conservatism	Far-right	—N/a	1992 (5 seats); 1995/2000 (4 seats); 2003 (8 seats); 2007 (1 seat)	Claims legacy to the Party of Rights
Democrats; Demokrati	–	Ivan Lukež	Social democracy; Social liberalism; Progressivism	Centre-left	—N/a	2018 (1 seat) (Note: Mirando Mrsić was elected as member of SDP but joined Democrats mid-term in 2018)	
Focus; Fokus	–	Gabrijel Deak	Economic liberalism	Centre to centre-right	ALDE Party	2020 (1 seat); 2024 (1 seat)	
Green Alternative – Sustainable Development of Croatia; Zelena alternativa - Održivi razvoj Hrvatske	ORaH	Zorislav Antun Petrović	Green politics; Social progressivism	Centre-left	EGP (associate)	2014 EP (1 seat); 2013 (1 seat) (Note: Mirela Holy was elected as member of SDP but joined ORaH mid-term in 2018)	
Independent Youth List; Nezavisna lista mladih	NLM	Petar Maretić	Youth politics	Centre-right	—N/a	2016 (1 seat)	
New Left; Nova ljevica	NL	Ivana Kekin	Social democracy; Democratic socialism; Progressivism	Centre-left to left-wing	—N/a	2020 (1 seat)	Merging into Možemo!
People's Party – Reformists; Narodna stranka – Reformisti	Reformisti	Radimir Čačić	Liberalism; Economic liberalism	Centre	EDP	2015 (1 seat); 2016 (1 seat); 2020 (1 seat)	
Social Democrats; Socijaldemokrati	–	Davorko Vidović	Social democracy; Progressivism	Centre-left	—N/a	2022 (Note: Held 11 seats between 2022 and 2024 after split from SDP)	
Workers' Front; Radnička fronta	RF	Collective leadership	Democratic socialism; Left-wing populism; Progressivism	Left-wing to far-left	PEL	2020 (1 seat)	

- † Croatian Christian Democratic Union (Hrvatska kršćanska demokratska unija or HKDU) – won 1 seat in 1995, 1 seat in 2000
- † Croatian Democratic Peasant Party (Hrvatska demokratska seljačka stranka or HDSS) – won 1 seat in 2003
- † Croatian Growth (Hrvatski rast or Hrast) – active from 2012 to 2021
- † Croatian Independent Democrats (Hrvatski nezavisni demokrati or HND) – active from 1994 to 2011; won 1 seat in 1995
- Croatian Party of Rights — Dr. Ante Starčević (Hrvatska stranka prava dr. Ante Starčević or HSP AS) – won 1 seat in 2011; 3 seats in 2015
- † Dalmatian Action (Dalmatinska akcija or DA) – active from 1990 to 2003; won 1 seat in 1992
- † Democratic Centre (Demokratski centar or DC) – active from 2000 to 2016; won 1 seat in 2003
- † Liberal Party (Liberalna stranka or LS) – active from 1998 to 2006; won 2 seats in 2000 and 2003
- † Party of Croatian Intergenerational Solidarity (Stranka međugeneracijske solidarnosti Hrvatske or SMSH) – active from 2016 to 2017; had 1 seat in 2016 (merged into BM 365)
- † Party of Liberal Democrats (Stranka liberalnih demokrata or LIBRA) – active from 2002 to 2005; won 3 seats in 2003
- † Serb People's Party (Srpska narodna stranka/Српска народна странка or SNS/CHC) – won 3 seats in 1992; 2 seats in 1995; 1 seat in 2000
- † Slavonia-Baranja Croatian Party (Slavonsko-baranjska hrvatska stranka or S-BHS) – active from 1992 to 2008, won 1 seat in 1995; 1 seat in 2000
- † Social Democratic Action of Croatia (Akcija socijaldemokrata Hrvatske or ASH) – active between 1994 and 2016; won 1 seat in 1995
- † The Key of Croatia (Ključ Hrvatske) – active between 2011 and 2024; won 1 seat in 2015; 8 seats in 2016 (merged into Law and Justice)

=== Other parties ===
- Alternative for Croatia (Alternativa za Hrvatsku or AZH)
- Autochthonous Croatian Party of Rights (Autohtona-Hrvatska stranka prava or A-HSP)
- Bloc Pensioners Together (Blok umirovljenici zajedno or BUZ)
- Charter for Rijeka or List for Rijeka (Lista za Rijeku/Lista per Fiume; RI or LZR)
- † Croatian Bloc (Hrvatski blok or HB) – active 2002–2009
- † Croatian Conservative Party (Hrvatska konzervativna stranka or HKS) – active 2014–2021
- Croatian Party of Rights 1861 (Hrvatska stranka prava 1861 or HSP 1861)
- † Croatian Pure Party of Rights (Hrvatska čista stranka prava or HČSP)
- † Croatian Republican Union (Hrvatska republikanska zajednica or HRZ)
- † Croatian Workers Party (Hrvatska radnička stranka or HRS)
- Democratic Alliance of Serbs (Demokratski savez Srba/Демократски caвeз Cpбa or DSS/ДСC)
- Democratic HSS (Demokratski HSS or DHSS)
- Democratic Party of Zagorje (Zagorska demokratska stranka or ZDS)
- Determination and Justice (Odlučnost i pravednost or OiP)
- † For the City (Za grad or ZG)
- † Green Alliance – Greens (Zeleni savez – Zeleni)
- † Independents for Croatia (Neovisni za Hrvatsku, NHR)
- † Istrian Social Democratic Forum (Istarski socijaldemokratski forum or ISDF)
- † Left of Croatia (Ljevica Hrvatske)
- LiPO (Lika, primorje i otoci)
- Međimurje Party (Međimurska stranka)
- † Only Croatia – Movement for Croatia (Jedino Hrvatska – Pokret za Hrvatsku)
- † Party of Danube Serbs (Partija podunavskih Srba/Партија подунавских Срба or PPS/ППС)
- † Party of Ivan Pernar (Stranka Ivana Pernara or SIP)
- † Pirate Party (Piratska stranka)
- † Republic (Republika)
- † Serb Democratic Party (Srpska demokratska stranka/Српска демократска cтранка or SDS/СДС)
- Socialist Labour Party of Croatia (Socijalistička radnička partija Hrvatske or SRP)
- † The Split Party (Splitska stranka)
- † Women's Democratic Party (Demokratska stranka žena or DSŽ)
- Youth Action (Akcija mladih or AM)
- Zagorje Party (Zagorska stranka or ZS)

== Historical parties ==
- Illyrian Party/People's Party (Ilirska stranka/Narodna stranka, 1841–1861)
- People's Liberal Party/Independent People's Party (Narodno-liberalna stranka/Neodvisna narodna stranka, 1861–1903)
- Croatian-Hungarian Party (Hrvatsko-ugarska stranka, 1841–1861)
- Unionist Party/People's Constitutional Party (Unionistička stranka/Narodno-ustavna stranka, 1861–1873)
- Party of Rights/Croatian Party of Rights (Stranka prava/Hrvatska stranka prava, 1861–1910)
- Pure Party of Rights/Croatian Pure Party of Rights (Čista stranka prava/Hrvatska čista stranka prava, 1895–1918)
- Starčević's Party of Rights (Starčevićeva stranka prava, 1908–1911–1918)
- Croatian People's Progressive Party (Napredna stranka/Hrvatska pučka napredna stranka, 1904–1910)
- Progressive Democratic Party (Napredna demokratska stranka, 1918–1919)
- Serb Independent Party/Serb People's Independent Party (Srpska samostalna stranka/Srpska narodna samostalna stranka, 1881–1918)
- Serb People's Radical Party (Srpska narodna radikalna stranka, 1903–1918)
- Croatian Independent Party (Hrvatska samostalna stranka, 1910–1918)
- Social Democratic Party of Croatia and Slavonia (Socijaldemokratska stranka Hrvatske i Slavonije, 1894–1918)
- Croat-Serb Coalition (Hrvatsko-srpska koalicija, 1905–1918)
- Autonomist Party (Dalmatia) (Autonomna stranka, 1860–1918)
- People's Party/People's Croatian Party or Croatian National Party (Dalmatia) (Narodna stranka/Narodna hrvatska stranka, 1861–1905)
- Serbian Party or Serb People's Party (Dalmatia) (Srpska stranka/Srpska narodna stranka, 1879–1918)
- Croatian Party (Dalmatia) (Hrvatska stranka, 1905–1918)
- Democratic Party (Dalmatia) (Demokratska stranka, 1904–1906)
- Croat-Slovene People's Party (Istria) (Hrvatsko-slovenska narodna stranka, 1878–1918)
- Croatian Popular Party (Hrvatska pučka stranka, 1919–1929)
- Croatian Union (Hrvatska zajednica, 1919–1926)
- Communist Party of Croatia/League of Communists of Croatia (Komunistička partija Hrvatske/Savez komunista Hrvatske, 1937–1990)

▶ Note: The Croatian adjective "narodni/a/o" could be translated as "people's" and/or "national", similar adjective "pučki/a/o" signifies "popular" or "people's" (but not "national").

== See also ==
- Lists of political parties
- Liberalism in Croatia
- Left-wing politics in Croatia
- Far-right politics in Croatia
