= Electoral district VI (Croatian Parliament) =

- Constituency for the Croatian Parliament
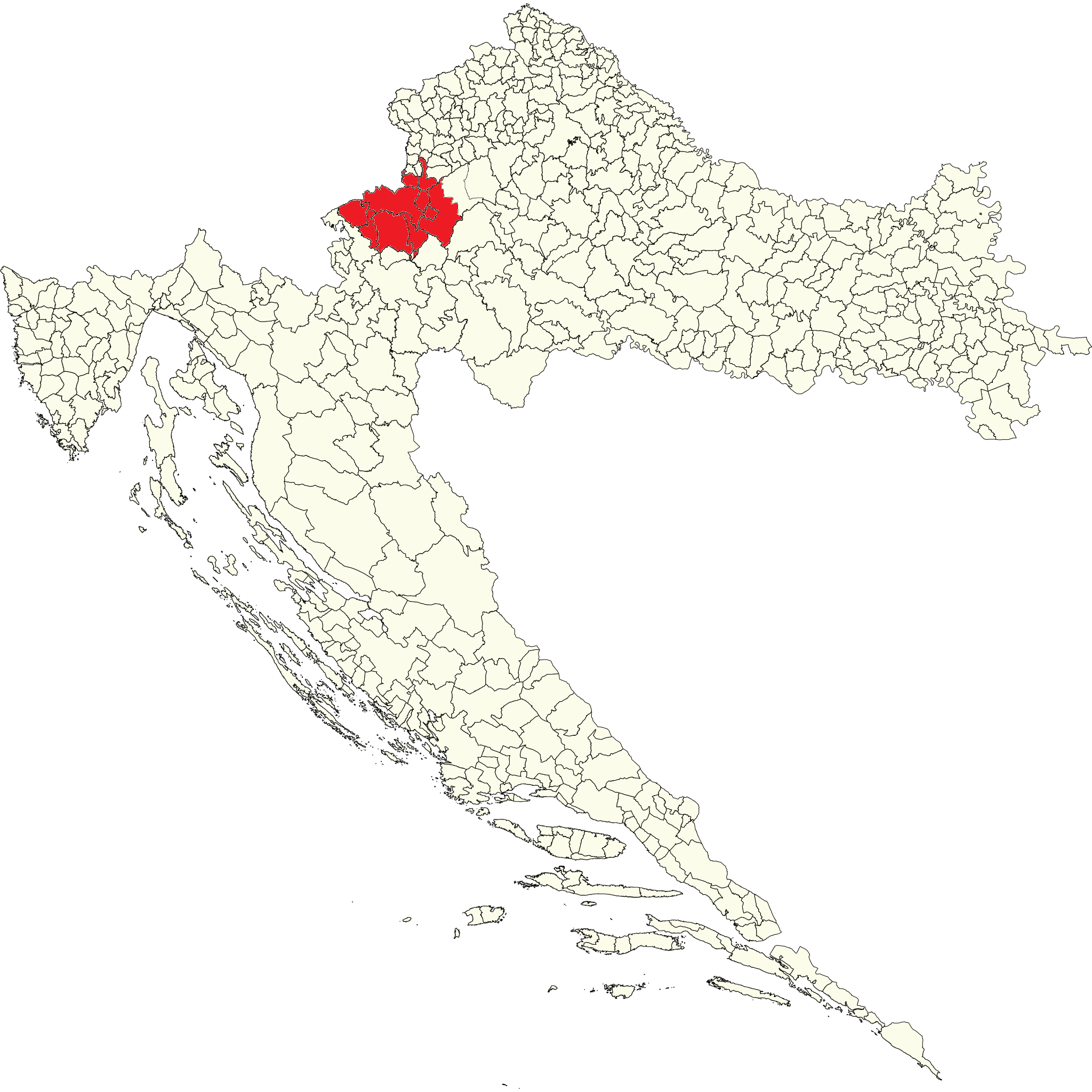
- Map of Electoral district VI (2023-present)
- Electorate: 365,584 (2025)
- Major settlements: Zagreb, Samobor, Sveta Nedelja, Jastrebarsko

Current constituency
- Created: 2023
- Number of members: 14

Electoral district VI (Croatian: VI. izborna jedinica) is one of twelve electoral districts of the Croatian Parliament. In 2025, the district had 365,584 registered voters.

== Boundaries ==
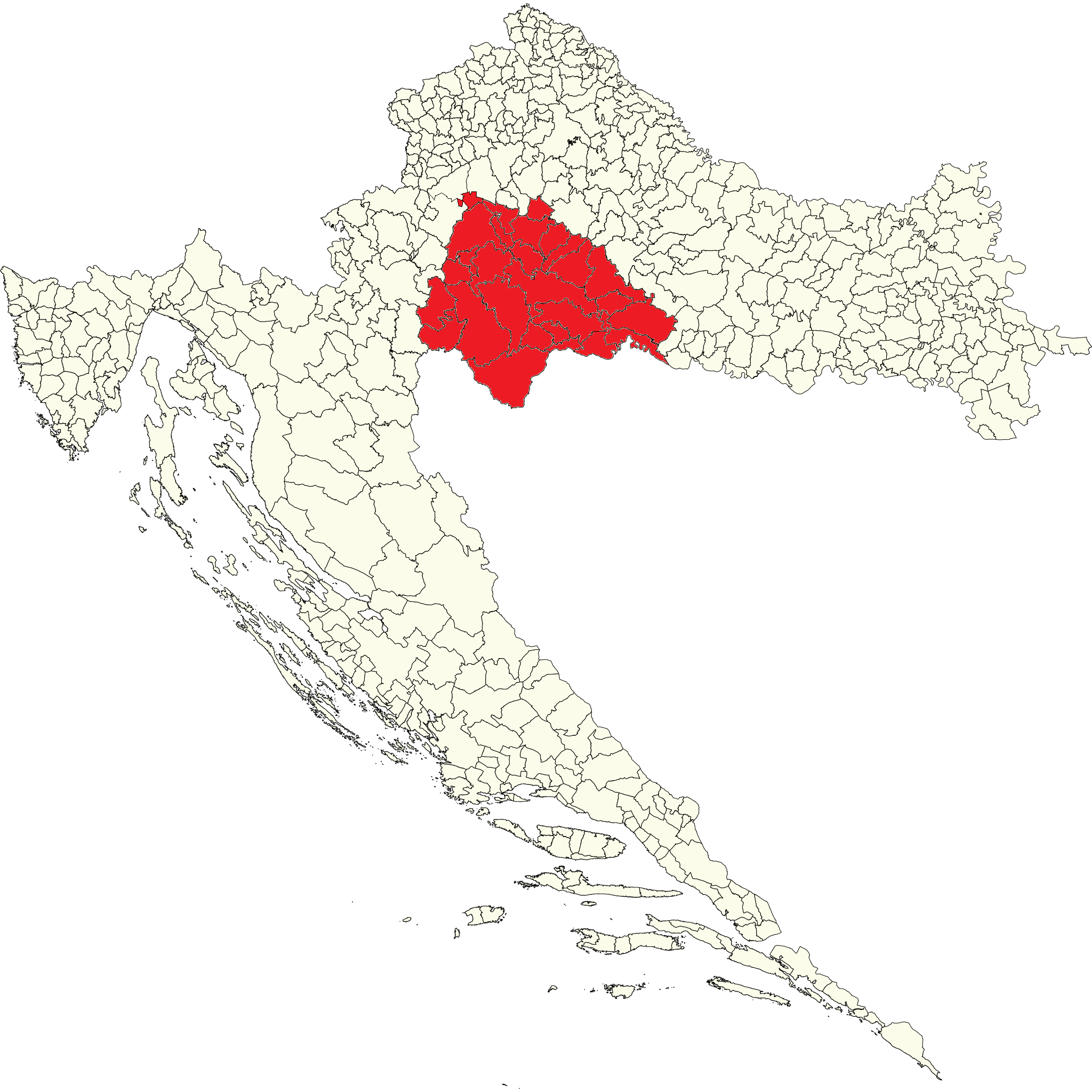
Electoral district VI (1999-2023)

=== Creation ===
Electoral district VI consisted of:

- The southeastern part of Zagreb County including the cities and municipalities: Ivanić Grad, Kloštar Ivanić, Kravarsko, Križ, Orle, Pokupsko, Rugvica, Velika Gorica;
- The whole Sisak-Moslavina County;
- The southeastern part of the City of Zagreb including the city districts and streets: Volovčica, Folnegovićevo naselje, Donje Svetice, Bruno Bušić, Borongaj-Lugovi, Vukomerec, Ferenščica, Savica-Šanci, Žitnjak, Kozari Bok, Resnik, Kozari Putovi, Petruševac, Ivanja Reka, Trnava, Resnički Gaj, Kanal, Zapruđe, Utrine, Travno, Sopot, Siget, Sloboština, Dugave, Središće.

=== 2023 revision ===
Under the 2023 revision, district boundaries were redrawn according to the suggestion of the Constitutional Court to compel a proportional number of voters.

The new district consists of:

- The western part of the City of Zagreb:
  - city districts: Brezovica, Novi Zagreb – zapad, Podsused – Vrapče, Stenjevec, Trešnjevka – jug and Trešnjevka – sjever
- The western and southwestern part of Zagreb County:
  - cities and municipalities: Jastrebarsko, Samobor, Sveta Nedelja, Zaprešić, Brdovec, Klinča Sela, Krašić, Stupnik and Žumberak

== Representatives ==
The current representatives of the sixth electoral district in the Croatian Parliament are:

Name	Party	Deputizing
Danijela Blažanović	HDZ	Vili Beroš
Mislav Herman	HDZ	
Marko Pavić	HDZ	Davor Božinović
Željko Turk	HDZ	Davor Ivo Stier
Marija Lugarić	SDP	
Ivan Račan	SDP	
Mihael Zmajlović	SDP	
Rada Borić	Možemo!	Tomislav Tomašević
Urša Raukar-Gamulin	Možemo!	
Marin Živković	Možemo!	Gordan Bosanac
Nikola Grmoja	Most	
Igor Peternel	DOMiNO	
Krešo Beljak	HSS	
Dario Zurovec	Independent	

== Elections ==
=== 2000 Elections ===
Party	Votes	%	Seats
SDP - HSLS	117.928	44.75	7
HDZ	62.058	23.55	4
HSS - LS - HNS	32.067	12.17	2
HSP - HKDU	16.487	6.26	1
others	34.968	13.27	0
Total	263.508	100	14
Valid votes	263.508	98.40	
Invalid/blank votes	4.287	1.60	
Total votes	267.795	77.42	
Registered voters/turnout	345.904		
Source: Results Archived 2022-11-25 at the Wayback Machine

SDP - HSLS

- Davorko Vidović
- Jozo Radoš
- Snježana Biga Friganović
- Tonino Picula
- Dorica Nikolić
- Slavko Kojić
- Katica Sedmak

HDZ

- Ivica Kostović
- Đuro Brodarac
- Ivan Milas
- Ivan Šuker

HSS - LS - HNS

- Stjepan Radić
- Zdenko Haramija

HSP - HKDU

- Vlado Jukić

=== 2003 Elections ===
Party	Votes	%	Seats	+/-
HDZ	73.578	32.08	6	+2
SDP - LS	58.202	25.38	5	-2
HSP	19.545	8.52	1	0
HNS	19.174	8.36	1	0
HSS	16.678	7.27	1	0
others	42.182	18.39	0	0
Total	229.359	100	14	0
Valid votes	229.359	97.76		
Invalid/blank votes	5.255	2.24		
Total votes	234.614	68.23		
Registered voters/turnout	343.857			
Source: Results Archived 2022-11-25 at the Wayback Machine

HDZ

- Ivan Šuker
- Đuro Brodarac
- Stjepan Fiolić
- Mario Zubović
- Željko Nenadić
- Dražen Bošnjaković

SDP

- Davorko Vidović
- Ivo Banac
- Josip Leko
- Snježana Biga Friganović
- Ljubo Jurčić

HSP

- Velimir Kvesić

HNS

- Alenka Košiša Čičin-Šain

HSS

- Željko Ledinski

=== 2007 Elections ===
Party	Votes	%	Seats	+/-
SDP	79.818	36.08	6	+1
HDZ	75.723	34.23	6	0
HSS - HSLS	18.298	8.27	1	0
HNS	11.995	5.42	1	0
others	35.381	16.00	0	-1
Total	221.215	100	14	0
Valid votes	221.215	98.51		
Invalid/blank votes	3.339	1.49		
Total votes	224.554	62.98		
Registered voters/turnout	356.575			
Source: Results

SDP

- Tonino Picula
- Davorko Vidović
- Marina Lovrić
- Šime Lučin
- Rajko Ostojić
- Mirando Mrsić

HDZ

- Ivan Šuker
- Stjepan Fiolić
- Ivan Šantek
- Boris Kunst
- Dražen Bošnjaković
- Marija Pejčinović Burić

HSS - HSLS

- Marijana Petir

HNS

- Goran Beus Richembergh

=== 2011 Elections ===
Party	Votes	%	Seats	+/-
SDP - HNS - IDS - HSU	90.280	42.12	9	+2
HDZ - DC	46.055	21.49	4	-2
HL SR	12.591	5.81	1	+1
others	65.408	30.58	0	-1
Total	214.334	100	14	0
Valid votes	214.334	98.24		
Invalid/blank votes	3.845	1.76		
Total votes	218.179	61.90		
Registered voters/turnout	352.471			
Source: Results Archived 2022-11-25 at the Wayback Machine

SDP - HNS - IDS - HSU

- Marina Lovrić Merzel
- Neven Mimica
- Boris Blažeković
- Rajko Ostojić
- Mirela Holy
- Daniel Mondekar
- Vesna Fabijančić-Križanić
- Goran Beus Richembergh
- Šime Lučin

HDZ - DC

- Ivan Šuker
- Jasen Mesić
- Ivan Šantek
- Vesna Škare-Ožbolt

HL SR

- Mladen Novak

=== 2015 Elections ===
Party	Votes	%	Seats	+/-
SDP - HNS - HSU - HL SR - A-HSS - ZS	70.925	35.35	6	-4
HDZ - HSS - HSP AS - BUZ - HSLS - HRAST - HDS - ZDS	66.096	32.94	5	+1
Most	28.002	13.96	2	+2
BM365 - DPS - DSŽ - HES - HRS - HSZ - ID - MS - NSH - Novi val - SU - UDU - Zeleni - ZS	11.456	5.71	1	+1
others	24.160	12.04	0	0
Total	200.639	100	14	0
Valid votes	200.639	98.23		
Invalid/blank votes	3.625	1.77		
Total votes	204.264	63.60		
Registered voters/turnout	321.179			
Source: Results Archived 2022-11-25 at the Wayback Machine

SDP - HNS - HSU - HL SR - A-HSS - ZS

- Boris Lalovac
- Rajko Ostojić
- Goran Beus Richembergh
- Mirando Mrsić
- Ivo Jelušić
- Zoran Vasić

HDZ - HSS - HSP AS - BUZ - HSLS - HRAST - HDS - ZDS

- Goran Marić
- Ivo Žinić
- Gordan Jandroković
- Dražen Barišić
- Dražen Bošnjaković

Most

- Jasna Matulić
- Juro Martinović

BM365 - DPS - DSŽ - HES - HRS - HSZ - ID - MS - NSH - Novi val - SU - UDU - Zeleni - ZS

- Miodrag Demo

=== 2016 Elections ===
Party	Votes	%	Seats	+/-
HDZ	59.653	35.08	6	+1
SDP - HNS - HSS - HSU	58.746	34.55	5	-1
Most	15.763	9.27	1	-1
BM365 - NS R - Novi val - HSS SR - BUZ	12.899	7.58	1	0
ŽZ - PH - AM	11.200	6.58	1	+1
others	11.756	6.94	0	0
Total	170.017	100	14	0
Valid votes	170.017	97.94		
Invalid/blank votes	3.579	2.06		
Total votes	173.596	54.72		
Registered voters/turnout	317.238			
Source: Results Archived 2022-11-25 at the Wayback Machine

HDZ

- Goran Marić
- Ivo Žinić
- Dražen Barišić
- Drago Prgomet
- Dražen Bošnjaković
- Jasen Mesić

SDP - HNS - HSS - HSU

- Mirando Mrsić
- Bojan Glavašević
- Nenad Stazić
- Željko Lenart
- Goran Beus Richembergh

Most

- Nikola Grmoja

BM365 - NS R - Novi val - HSS SR - BUZ

- Darinko Dumbović

ŽZ - PH - AM - HDSS - Abeceda

- Ivan Pernar

=== 2020 Elections ===
Party	Votes	%	Seats	+/-
HDZ	55.574	37.86	6	0
SDP - HSS - HSU - SNAGA - GLAS - IDS - PGS - NS R	35.565	24.23	4	-1
DP - HS - BLOK - HKS - HRAST - SU - ZL	16.193	11.03	2	+2
Možemo - ZJN - NL - RF - ORAH - ZG	13.915	9.48	1	+1
Most	10.267	6.99	1	0
others	15.253	10.41	0	-2
Total	146.766	100	14	0
Valid votes	146.766	97.63		
Invalid/blank votes	3.569	2.37		
Total votes	150.335	45.76		
Registered voters/turnout	328.499			
Source: Results Archived 2025-02-22 at the Wayback Machine

HDZ

- Davor Božinović
- Marijana Petir
- Krunoslav Katičić
- Dražen Barišić
- Ivan Celjak
- Dražen Bošnjaković

SDP - HSS - HSU - SNAGA - GLAS - IDS - PGS - NS R

- Davorko Vidović
- Boris Lalovac
- Ivana Posavec Krivec
- Željko Lenart

DP - HS - BLOK - HKS - HRAST - SU - ZL

- Željko Sačić
- Stephen Nikola Bartulica

Možemo - ZJN - NL - RF - ORAH - ZG

- Bojan Glavašević

Most

- Nikola Grmoja

=== 2024 Elections ===
Party	Votes	%	Seats	+/-
HDZ - HSLS - HDS - HNS - HSU	58.656	24.84	4	-2
SDP - Centre - HSS - DO i SP - NS R - GLAS	56.235	23.81	4	0
DP - PiP - DHSS - ZL - Agrameri	20.515	8.70	1	-1
Možemo	42.841	18.41	3	+2
Most - HS - HKS - NLM	22.433	9.50	1	0
Focus - Republic	18.316	7.75	1	+1
others	15.253	10.41	0	0
Total	236.121	100	14	0
Valid votes	236.121	97.65		
Invalid/blank votes	5.679	2.35		
Total votes	241.800	68.65		
Registered voters/turnout	352.234			
Source: Results

HDZ - HSLS - HDS - HNS - HSU

- Davor Božinović
- Davor Ivo Stier
- Vili Beroš
- Mislav Herman

SDP - Centre - HSS - DO i SP - NS R - GLAS

- Krešo Beljak
- Mihael Zmajlović
- Marija Lugarić
- Ivan Račan

Možemo

- Tomislav Tomašević
- Urša Raukar-Gamulin
- Gordan Bosanac

Most - HS - HKS - NLM

- Nikola Grmoja

DP - PiP - DHSS - ZL - Agrameri

- Igor Peternel

Focus - Republic

- Dario Zurovec
