= 2013 European Parliament election in Croatia =

- 14 April 2013

12 seats in the European Parliament
- Turnout: 20.83%
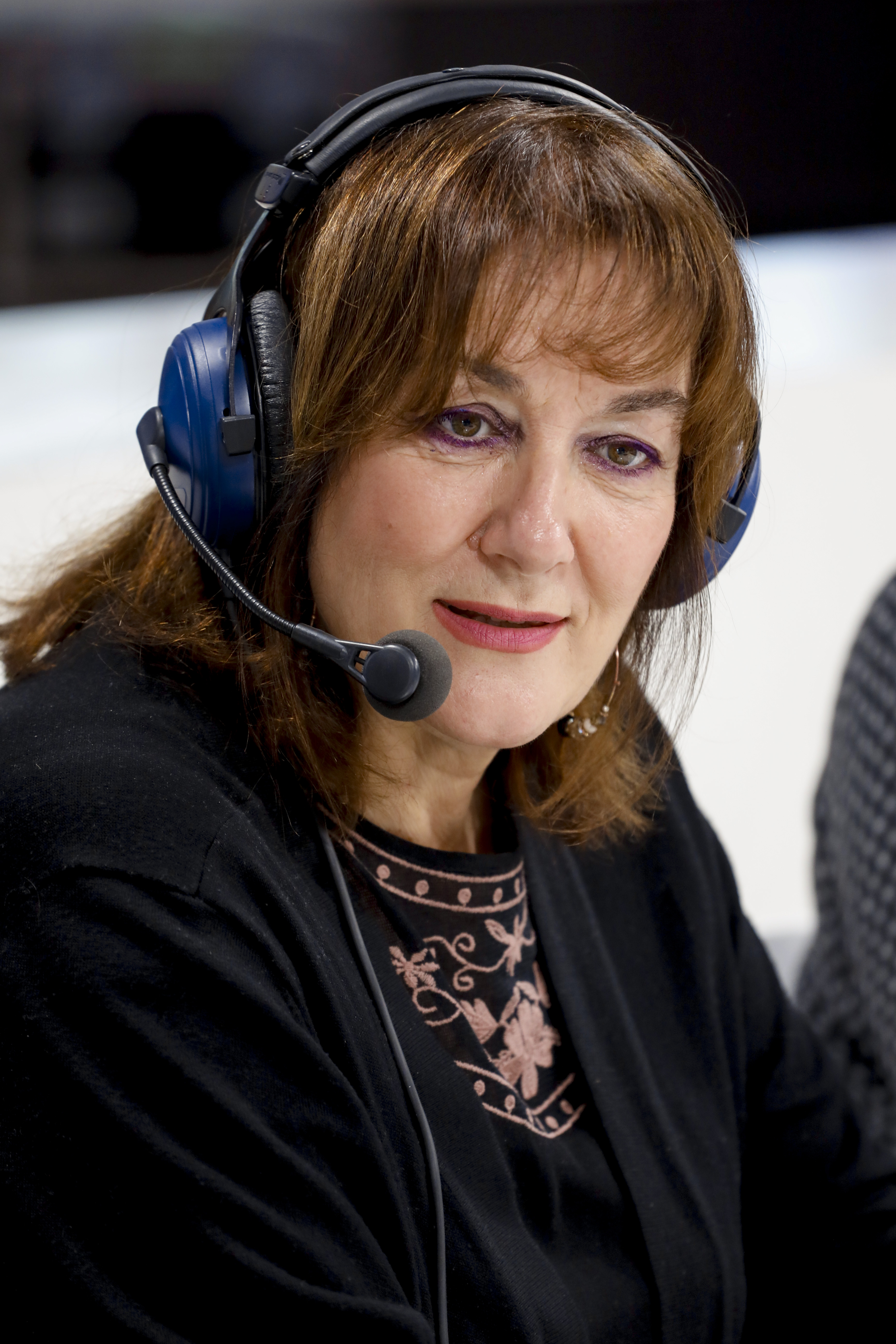

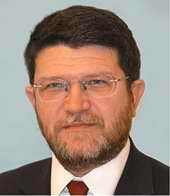
	First party	Second party	Third party
Leader	Dubravka Šuica	Tonino Picula	Nikola Vuljanić
Party	HDZ–HSP AS–BUZ	SDP–HNS–HSU	Labour
Alliance	EPP	S&D	GUE/NGL
Leader since			15 March 2010
Seats won	6 / 12	5 / 12	1 / 12
Popular vote	243,654	237,778	42,750
Percentage	32.86%	32.07%	5.77%

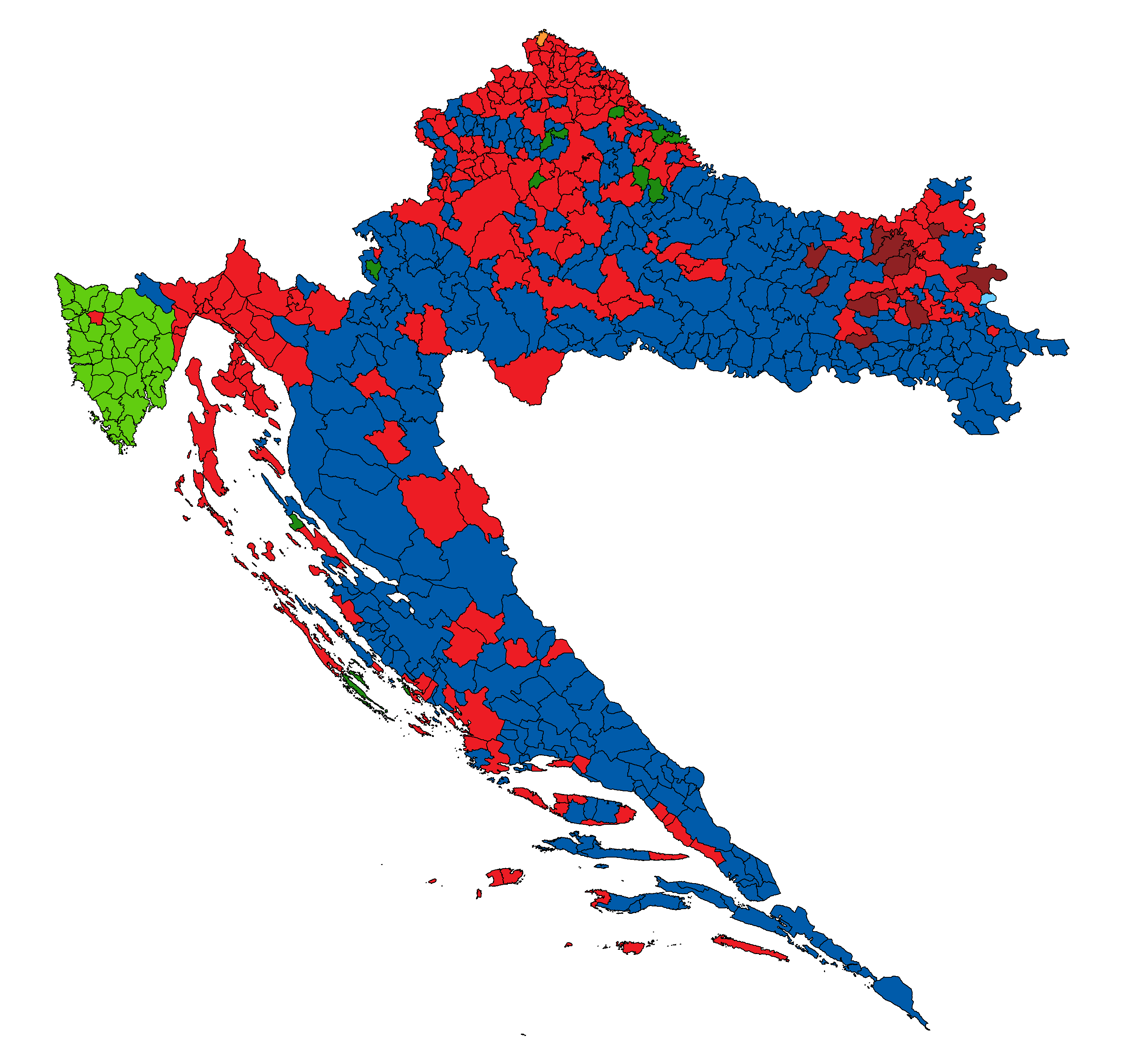
Results of the election based on the majority of votes in each municipality of Croatia HDZ coalition SDP coalition Voters' group – Ivan Jakovčić HDSSB HSS-HSLS Labour NS-NSS

Results by municipality, shaded according to winning party's percentage of the vote.: HDZ—>80% HDZ—70–80% HDZ—60–70% HDZ—50–60% HDZ—40–50% HDZ—<40% / SDP—>80% SDP—70–80% SDP—60–70% SDP—50–60% SDP—40–50% SDP—<40% / NL Jakovčić—60–70% NL Jakovčić—50–60% NL Jakovčić—40–50% NL Jakovčić—<40% HDSSB—40–50% HDSSB—<40% HSS-HSLS—50–60% HSS-HSLS—40–50% HSS-HSLS—<40% Labour—<40% NS-NSS—60–70%

European Parliament elections were held in Croatia for the first time on 14 April 2013 to elect twelve Members of the European Parliament. The members served the remainder of the Parliament's 2009–2014 term after Croatia entered the European Union on 1 July 2013. The country formed a single constituency, with members elected by proportional representation using open lists.

Despite opinion polling predicting a decisive victory of the governing centre left SDP-led coalition, the centre right HDZ-led coalition won a razor-thin plurality of the vote. The turnout of just 20.8% was the lowest turnout in a national election in modern Croatian history.

The HDZ has won every EU election since, As of 2024.

== Parties ==
No	Abbreviation	Full Name
1	ABECEDA	Abeceda demokracije
2	AMD	Agenda mladih demokrata
3	AM	Youth Action
4	ASH; DSŽ; SP; SUH	Social Democratic Action of Croatia; Women's Democratic Party; Savez za promjene Stranka umirovljenika Hrvatske – Blok umirovljenici zajedno
5	ABH; JEDINO HRVATSKA	Akcija za bolju Hrvatsku; Only Croatia – Movement for Croatia
6	A-HSS	Authentic Croatian Peasant Party
7	A-HSP	Authentic Croatian Party of Rights
8	DC	Democratic Centre
9	GLAS RAZUMA; MS	Glas razuma Međimurska stranka
10	HRAST	Croatian Growth–Movement for a Successful Croatia (Hrvatski rast – Pokret za uspješnu Hrvatsku)
11	HČSP	Croatian Pure Party of Rights
12	HDZ; HSP AS; BUZ	Croatian Democratic Union; Croatian Party of Rights dr. Ante Starčević; Blok umirovljenici zajedno
13	HRS	Hrvatska radnička stranka
14	HSS; HSLS	Croatian Labour Party; Croatian Social Liberal Party
15	HSP	Croatian Party of Rights
16	HDSSB; HDSSD; ZH	Croatian Democratic Alliance of Slavonia and Baranja; Hrvatski demokratski slobodarski savez Dalmacije; Zeleni Hrvatske (Zeleni HR)
17	HL	Croatian Labourists – Labour Party
18	KLGB-IJ	Kandidacijska lista grupe biraca – Ivan Jakovčić
19	NS; NSS	Naša stranka Nova srpska stranka
20	NSH	Nezavisni seljaci Hrvatske
21	OS	Obiteljska stranka
22	PS	Pirate Party
23	PZMH	Pokret za modernu Hrvatsku
24	SDP; HNS; HSU	Social Democratic Party of Croatia; Croatian People's Party – Liberal Democrats; Croatian Party of Pensioners
25	SRP	Socialist Labour Party
26	SU	Stranka umirovljenika
27	ZNL	Zagrebačka nezavisna lista
28	ZZ	Zeleni Zajedno

== Opinion polls ==
Date	Polling Organisation/Client	Sample size	SDP · HNS-LD · HSU	HDZ · HSP-AS · BUZ	Labour	Other/Undecided
8 April	Promocija Plus for HRT	1,300	29.5% (6 seats)	22.2% (5 seats)	7.5% (1 seat)	40.8%
31 March (High turnout)	Ipsos Puls for Nova TV	802	26.3% (6 seats)	18.4% (4 seats)	10.0% (2 seats)	45.3%
31 March (Low turnout)	Ipsos Puls for Nova TV	802	32.7% (7 seats)	19.9% (4 seats)	7.5% (1 seat)	39.9%

== Results ==
Party	Votes	%	Seats
HDZ–HSP AS–BUZ (Note: Of the six seats, the HDZ won five and HSP AS one.)	243,654	32.86	6
SDP–HNS–HSU (Note: The SDP won all five seats.)	237,778	32.07	5
Croatian Labourists – Labour Party	42,750	5.77	1
HSS–HSLS	28,646	3.86	0
Voters' group – Ivan Jakovčić	28,445	3.84	0
HDSSB–HDSSD–ZH	22,328	3.01	0
Croatian Growth–Movement for a Successful Croatia	18,893	2.55	0
Youth Action	11,068	1.49	0
Pensioners' Party	10,947	1.48	0
Croatian Party of Rights	10,317	1.39	0
Greens Together	8,599	1.16	0
Pirate Party	8,345	1.13	0
Authentic Croatian Peasant Party	6,785	0.92	0
ASH–DSŽ–SP–SUH	6,391	0.86	0
Democratic Centre	5,413	0.73	0
Croatian Pure Party of Rights	5,238	0.71	0
Voice of Reason–Međimurje Party	4,939	0.67	0
Alphabet of Democracy	4,878	0.66	0
ABH–JH	4,531	0.61	0
Family Party	4,391	0.59	0
Croatian Workers Party	3,946	0.53	0
Our Party–New Serbian Party	3,933	0.53	0
Movement for a Modern Croatia	3,885	0.52	0
Democratic Youth Agenda	3,667	0.49	0
Independent Farmers of Croatia	3,646	0.49	0
Socialist Labour Party of Croatia	3,538	0.48	0
Authentic Croatian Party of Rights	2,350	0.32	0
Zagreb Independent List	2,107	0.28	0
Total	741,408	100.00	12
Valid votes	741,408	94.93	
Invalid/blank votes	39,572	5.07	
Total votes	780,980	100.00	
Registered voters/turnout	3,748,815	20.83	
Source: State Electoral Commission

=== Elected lists and candidates ===
12: HDZ – HSP AS – BUZ	17: HL	24: SDP – HNS – HSU
1. Dubravka Šuica; 2. Andrej Plenković; 3. Davor Ivo Stier; 4. Ivana Maletić; 5. Zdravka Bušić; 6. Ruža Tomašić (HSP AS)	1. Nikola Vuljanić	1. Tonino Picula; 2. Biljana Borzan; 3. Marino Baldini; 4. Oleg Valjalo; 5. Sandra Petrović Jakovina

== See also ==
- List of members of the European Parliament for Croatia, 2013–2014
