= Green List (disambiguation) =

Green List (2005) was a political party in Croatia.

Green List (2017) is a political party in Croatia.

Green List may also refer to:

- Green List (Spain) (1989), a short-lived political alliance
- Green List, Ecological Initiative (1989–1994), merged into The Greens (Luxembourg)
- Federation of Green Lists (1986–1990), Italy

== See also ==
- Shades of green (the colour)
