= 2007 Croatian parliamentary election =

- 25 November 2007
- All 153 seats in the Croatian Parliament; 77 seats needed for a majority
- Turnout: 59.48% (▼2.17pp)
Party	Leader	Vote %	Seats	+/–
HDZ	Ivo Sanader	36.62	66	0
SDP	Zoran Milanović	31.33	56	+22
HNS-LD	Vesna Pusić	6.79	7	−3
HSS–HSLS coalition	Josip Friščić	6.53	8	−6
HSU–DSU	Vladimir Jordan	4.08	1	−2
HSP	Anto Đapić	3.50	1	−7
HDSSB	Branimir Glavaš	1.80	3	New
IDS	Ivan Jakovčić	1.54	3	−1
Minority lists
SDSS	Vojislav Stanimirović	62.56	3	0
MESZ	Deneš Šoja	47.83	1	+1
SDAH	Šemso Tanković	30.85	1	0
MRUH	Nafiz Memedi	12.76	1	New
Independents	–	–	2	+1
This lists parties that won seats. See the complete results below.
Result by constituency
Prime Minister before	Prime Minister after
Ivo Sanader; HDZ	Ivo Sanader; HDZ

Parliamentary elections were held in Croatia on 25 November 2007 and for overseas voters on 24 and 25 November. The campaign officially started on 3 November. The President of Croatia announced elections on 17 October and 14 days were allowed for candidate lists to be submitted.

Elections were held in 10 electoral districts inside Croatia (each providing 14 members of parliament), one electoral district for Croatian citizens living abroad (with a maximum 12 members of parliament), and one electoral district for national minorities (8 members of parliament). Candidate lists have to win more than 5% of the votes in at least one electoral district in order to be represented in the parliament. 4,478,386 people in total were eligible to vote, 405,092 of whom are in the diaspora, 280,000 living in Bosnia-Herzegovina.

To prevent possible electoral fraud, such as votes from the deceased, or people voting twice in different locations, the Croatians outside Croatia who were eligible to vote had to register no later than 14 days before the election.

In three locales, the election were repeated on 9 December 2007; while this could not and did not change the final result as far as mandates are concerned, it meant the final result became known only on 11 December 2007.

The governing centre-right Croatian Democratic Union emerged as the relative winner of the election, but failed to obtain an outright majority. The opposition centre-left Social Democratic Party of Croatia achieved their best result ever as a party, but were unsuccessful in their attempt to become the strongest single party. The election resulted in the formation of the Sanader II cabinet supported by HDZ, HSS, HSLS and the representatives of national minorities.

== Participating parties ==
Croatian political parties and independent lists had to formally submit their candidates and eventual pre-election coalitions not later than 30 October. 3585 people from political parties or independent lists applied for the elections (22 people per seat). There were 235 political party lists, 16 independent lists and 72 candidates for minority seats. 29.93% of the candidates were women. The average age of the candidates was 43.41 years old; 44.70 for men, and 40.40 for women. The oldest candidate was 89, and the youngest 18. The State Electoral Committee had to confirm the lists before midnight of 2 November.

=== Parliamentary parties and coalitions ===
- Croatian Democratic Union (**HDZ**)
- Social Democratic Party (**SDP**)
- Croatian Peasant Party–Croatian Social Liberal Party-Alliance of Primorje-Gorski Kotar-Democratic Party of Zagorje-Zagorje Party) (**HSS**-**HSLS**-**PGS**-ZDS-ZS)
- Croatian People's Party – Liberal Democrats (**HNS**)
- Istrian Democratic Assembly (**IDS**)
- Croatian Party of Right (**HSP**)
- Croatian Democratic Alliance of Slavonia and Baranja (**HDSSB**)
- Croatian Party of Pensioners (coalition with Democratic Party of Pensioners) (**HSU**)
- Democratic Centre-Green Party – Green Alternative (**DC**-Zeleni)
- Independent Democratic Serb Party (national minorities electorate and 9th electorate) (**SDSS**)
- Political parties and lists of national minorities (12th electorate)

Parliamentary parties are with bolded acronyms.

=== Non-parliamentary parties ===
- Croatian Youth Party (HSM)
- Croatian Democratic Peasants' Party (HDSS)
- Croatian Pure Party of Right (HČSP)
- Croatian Christian Democratic Union (HKDU)
- Croatian Christian Democrats (Demokršćani)
- United Supporters of the Croatian Party of Right Movement (HP-HPP)
- Green List of Croatia (Zelena lista)
- Only Croatia – Movement for Croatia (Jedino Hrvatska)

=== Non-parliamentary coalitions ===
- "Left Coalition": Left of Croatia-Socialist Labour Party of Croatia-Istrian Social Democratic Forum-Croatian Socialdemocrats (Ljevica-SRP-ISDF-HSD)
- "United Left": Social Democratic Action of Croatia-Croatian Labour Party-Green Party-Adriatic Social Democratic Party of Croatia. In some electorates also with Women's Democratic Party. (ASH-HRS-ZS-JSD-DSŽ)
- Croatian Christian Democratic Party–Christian Social Union (HKSS-KSU)
- Democratic Union of Međimurje–Slavonia-Baranja Croatian Party–Dalmatian Liberal Party (in some electorates with Alliance of Primorje-Gorski Kotar) (DSM-SBHS-DLS-**PGS**)
- Greens of Croatia-Women's Democratic Party (Zeleni HR-DSŽ)
- Party of Pensioners-Istrian Social Democratic Independent Party (SU-ISDNS)

=== Independent Lists ===
- Slaven Letica
- Boris Mikšić
- Hrvoje Hitrec
- Ivan Lončar
- Drago Krpina
- Tonči Tadić
- Jerko Ivanković Lijanović

=== Distribution of minority seats ===
- Serbs: 3
- Hungarians: 1
- Italians: 1
- Czechs and Slovaks: 1
- Austrians, Bulgarians, Germans, Poles, Romani, Romanians, Rusyns, Russians, Turks, Ukrainians, Vlachs and Jews: 1
- Albanians, Bosniaks, Montenegrins, Macedonians, Slovenes: 1

=== Announced boycotts ===
- Marginal right wing Croatian Party of Right 1861 decided not to participate in the 2007 elections as they claimed the elections were unconstitutional.

=== Election spending ===
On 11 December 2007 GONG and Transparency International Croatia had published media spending of all Croatian political parties during the election period. This numbers are :

- Croatian Democratic Union 25,476,833 HRK or 51.9% of total
- Social Democratic Party of Croatia 8,150,728 HRK or 16.6% of total
- Croatian Peasant Party-Croatian Social Liberal Party 4,923,277 HRK or 10.0% of total
- Croatian People's Party – Liberal Democrats 4,204,998 HRK or 8.6% of total
- Croatian Party of Right 3,082,071 HRK or 6.1% of total
- Istrian Democratic Assembly 611,406 HRK or 1.2% of total
- Croatian Party of Pensioners 520,362 HRK or 1.1% of total
- Only Croatia – Movement for Croatia 348,686 HRK or 0.7% of total
- Democratic Centre 329,151 HRK or 0.7 of total
- Croatian Democratic Alliance of Slavonia and Baranja 283,212 HRK or 0.6% of total

== Electoral districts ==
The 10 districts, with the two non-geographical ones

Since 1999 Croatia has been divided into 10 geographically-based electorates with around 250 000 - 300 000 registered voters. Each electorate elects up to 14 MPs chosen by the standard D'Hondt formula.

In the 11th electorate, up to 12 members are chosen by proportional representation - depending on a number of voters in Croatia - to represent Croatian citizens residing abroad (known as the diaspora electorate) and 8 members from ethnic/national minorities.

In Croatia, the official threshold is 5% for parties and coalitions. However, since the country is divided in 10 voting districts with 14 elected representatives each, sometimes the threshold can be higher, depending on the number of "fallen lists" (lists that don't get at least 5%). If many votes are lost in this manner, a list that gets barely more than 5% will still get a seat, whereas if there is a small number of parties that all pass the threshold, the actual ("natural") threshold is close to 7.15%.

This system is greatly favorable to regional parties, i.e. parties that gain their votes in a single electorate (see IDS, HDSSB), and it is disfavorable to parties that have greater numbers but are widespread throughout the nation (see HSU and HSP).

This made also the forming of post-electoral coalitions somewhat unpredictable, as the overall success of one of the greatest parties can effectively turn out to be counterproductive if it is achieved at the expense of their foreseeable partner, causing them to not pass the threshold in some or all electorates (it happened to the HDZ-led coalition in previous 2003 election).

== Opinion polls ==
Date	Polling Organisation/Client	Sample size	HDZ	SDP	HNS-LD	HSS	HSP	HSLS	HSU	Other	Undecided	Lead
11/2007	Puls	1,300	32.5%	33.4%	5.9%	6.6%	3.8%	(HSS-HSLS)	4.8%			0.9%
11/2007	Media Metar	1,300	33.9%	36.2%	6.8%	5.4%	5.2%	(HSS-HSLS)	5.7%			2.3%
11/2007	CRO Demoskop	1,300	28.5%	31.2%	5.2%	5.5%	4.6%	(HSS-HSLS)	6.2%			2.7%
10/2007	Puls	1,300	28.7%	30.9%	5.1%	5.6%	5.0%	(HSS-HSLS)	5.9%			2.2%
10/2007	CRO Demoskop	1,300	26.4%	30.1%	5.8%	7.3%	6.4%	(HSS-HSLS)	6.0%			3.7%
9/2007	Puls	1,300	26.5%	31.6%	5.3%	5.9%	6.9%	(HSS-HSLS)	6.5%			5.1%
9/2007	CRO Demoskop	1,300	25.6%	29.2%	5.6%	7.8%	6.8%	(HSS-HSLS)	5.6%			3.6%
8/2007	Puls	1,300	24%	29%	5%	9%	8%	(HSS-HSLS)	8%			5.0%
7/2007	Puls	1,300	25.5%	30.1%	5.8%	6.8%	7.6%	(HSS-HSLS)	6.4%			4.6%
6/2007	Puls	1,300	23.2%	30.0%	6.3%	5.1%	9.0%	(HSS-HSLS)	6.9%			6.8%
5/2007	Puls	1,300	24.5%	28.7%	8.5%	6.4%	7.3%	(HSS-HSLS)	6.5%			4.2%
4/2007	Puls	1,300	23.1%	20.4%	9.1%	10.4%	8.5%	(HSS-HSLS)	7.6%			2.7%
3/2007	Puls	1,300	22.8%	18.8%	10.4%	7.7%	6.6%	3.8%	7.6%			4.0%
2/2007	Puls	1,300	23.4%	19.5%	9%	9.6%	8.8%	4.2%	6.3%			3.9%
12/2006	Puls	1,300	21%	16%	9%	10%	8%	5%	6%			5.0%
12/2006	CRO Demoskop	1,300	23.9%	24.3%	8.6%	6.4%	8.2%	3.5%	5.2%		13.7%	0.4%
10/2006	CRO Demoskop	1,300	26.1%	25.7%	8.6%	5.9%	8.0%	4.5%	5.1%		10.4%	0.4%
9/2006	CRO Demoskop	1,300	26.4%	25.5%	7.9%	5.8%	8.1%	4.1%	5.0%		11.3%	0.9%
8/2006	CRO Demoskop	1,300	26.3%	25.2%	8.1%	5.7%	8.1%	4.0%	5.1%		11.1%	1.1%
7/2006	CRO Demoskop	1,300	26.2%	25.3%	8.1%	5.2%	8.2%	3.9%	4.8%		12.4%	0.9%
6/2006	CRO Demoskop	1,300	26.2%	26.1%	7.6%	5.4%	8.2%	3.9%	5.1%		11.7%	0.1%
5/2006	CRO Demoskop	1,300	25.0%	26.7%	6.9%	5.4%	8.0%	3.7%	4.8%		13.4%	1.7%
4/2006	CRO Demoskop	1,300	25.2%	27.5%	7.3%	4.3%	8.0%	3.5%	4.1%		13.5%	2.3%
3/2006	CRO Demoskop	1,300	25.8%	26.5%	6.7%	5.6%	8.5%	4.6%	5.1%		12.5%	0.7%
2/2006	CRO Demoskop	1,300	26.4%	25.5%	7.4%	5.7%	9.3%	4.6%	3.9%		11.8%	0.9%
1/2006	CRO Demoskop	1,300	24.1%	26.3%	7.2%	5.4%	10.4%	3.5%	4.0%		14.2%	2.2%
12/2005	Puls	1,000	19.4%	22.2%	5.7%	9.7%	14.2%	4.5%	7.9%			2.8%
12/2005	CRO Demoskop	1,300	21.6%	26.9%	6.6%	5.2%	12.2%	2.9%	4.1%		14.1%	5.3%
11/2005	CRO Demoskop	1,300	24.9%	26.8%	7%	4.7%	11%	2.6%	3.7%		13.4%	1.9%
10/2005	CRO Demoskop	1,300	25.5%	25.1%	7.3%	5.1%	11.7%	2%	3.7%		12.1%	0.4%
9/2005	Mediana fides	1,006	26.9%	34.1%	-	-	12.7%	-	-			7.2%
9/2005	Puls		20.0%	22.0%	7.0%	8.0%	13.0%	4.0%	10.0%			2.0%
9/2005	CRO Demoskop	1,300	24.4%	25.6%	8.1%	4.7%	11.6%	2.2%	3.6%		12.1%	1.2%
8/2005	CRO Demoskop	1,300	24.8%	25.4%	8%	5.1%	10.9%	2.8%	3.1%		12.2%	0.6%
7/2005	CRO Demoskop	1,300	25.4%	25.3%	7.3%	5.2%	10.8%	2.4%	3.2%		11.8%	0.1%
6/2005	CRO Demoskop	1,300	25.3%	24.8%	6.8%	6.5%	10.8%	2.1%	3.6%		13%	0.5%
5/2005	CRO Demoskop	1,300	25.3%	25%	7.3%	6.2%	10.8%	2.5%	3.5%		10.7%	0.3%
4/2005	Mediana	-	13.8%	19.8%	3.4%	2.5%	7%	-	-			6.0%
4/2005	CRO Demoskop	1,300	26.2%	26%	8.2%	5.6%	9.3%	2.4%	2.1%		13.7%	0.2%
3/2005	CRO Demoskop	1,300	27.1%	26.8%	8.7%	4.9%	9.7%	2.1%	2.1%		13.4%	0.3%
2/2005	Večernji list	1,300	24.6%	26.7%	9.8%	-	8.3%	-	-			3.1%
2/2005	CRO Demoskop	1,300	27.7%	27.4%	9.9%	5.6%	8%	2.4%	1.5%		12.2%	0.3%
1/2005	CRO Demoskop	1,300	27.1%	25.8%	9.3%	6.6%	8.1%	3%	1.2%		14.4%	1.3%
12/2004	CRO Demoskop	1,300	27.4%	25%	10.3%	4,8%	7.1%	4.2%	1.2%		14.1%	2.4%
11/2004	Večernji list	1,300	22.8%	22.4%	-	-	-	-	-			0.4%
11/2004	CRO Demoskop	1,300	28.2%	24.2%	9.6%	5.1%	8.2%	2.8%	2%		13,9%	4.0%
10/2004	Večernji list	1,300	27.0%	18.9%	-	-	-	-	-			7.1%
7/2004	Promocija plus	1,300	33.3%	23.2%	10.5%	4.2%	3.0%	7.3	2.1%			10.1%
6/2004	Promocija plus	1,300	31.8%	22.8%	-	-	-	-	-			9.0%
3/2004	Promocija plus	1,300	32.9%	21.6%	8.5%	3.3%	6.5%	1.5%	3.8%			11.3%
2/2004	Promocija plus	1,300	31.9%	18.9%	10.5%	4.2%	4.4%	-	4.4%			13.0%
23 Nov	2003 parliamentary election	2,478,967	33.9%	22.6%	8.0%	7.2%	6.4%	4.0%	4.0%		N/A	11.3%

== Results ==
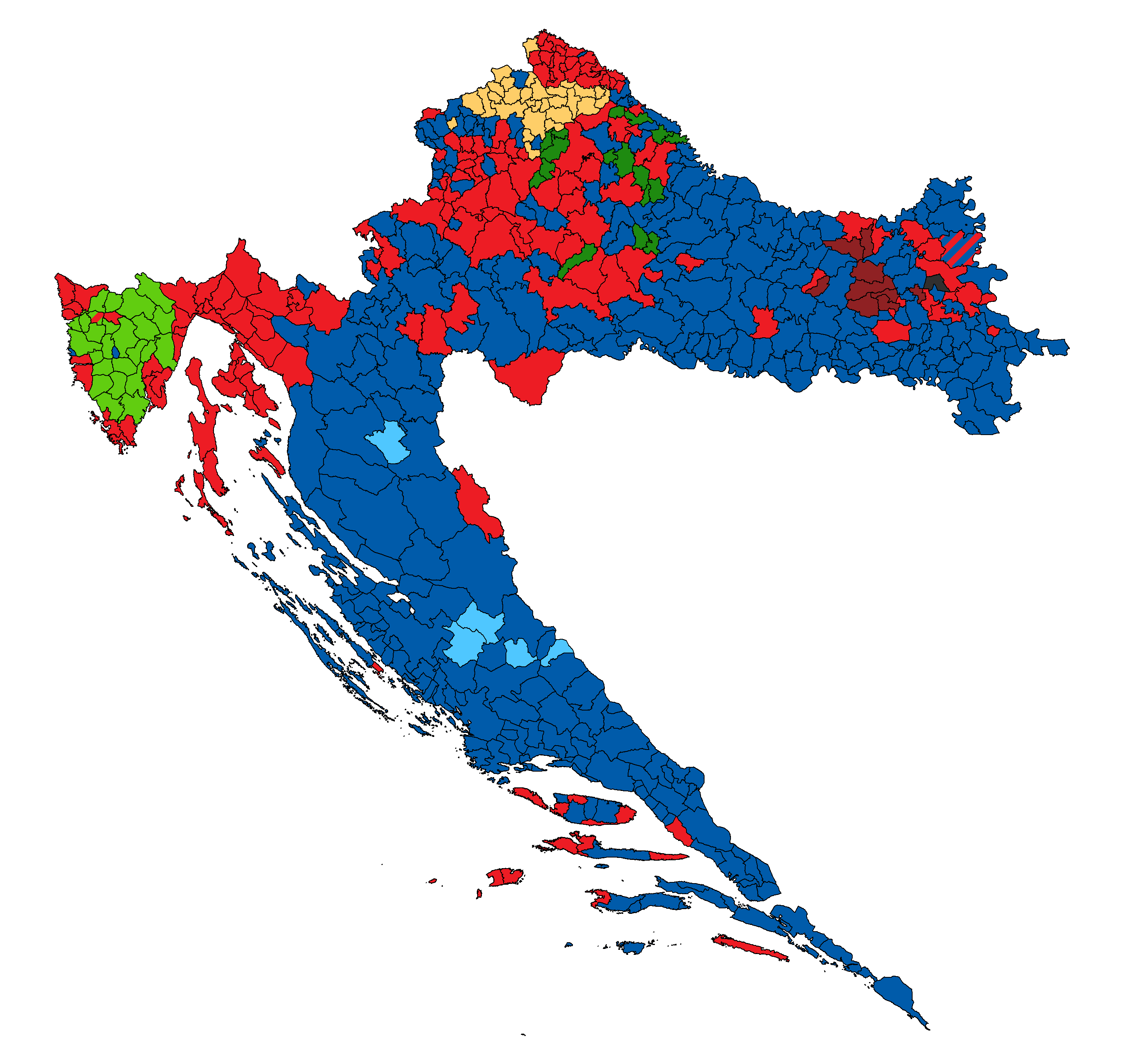
Results by municipality HDZ SDP HNS–LD HSS–HSLS–PGS–ZDS–ZS IDS SDSS HDSSB HSP

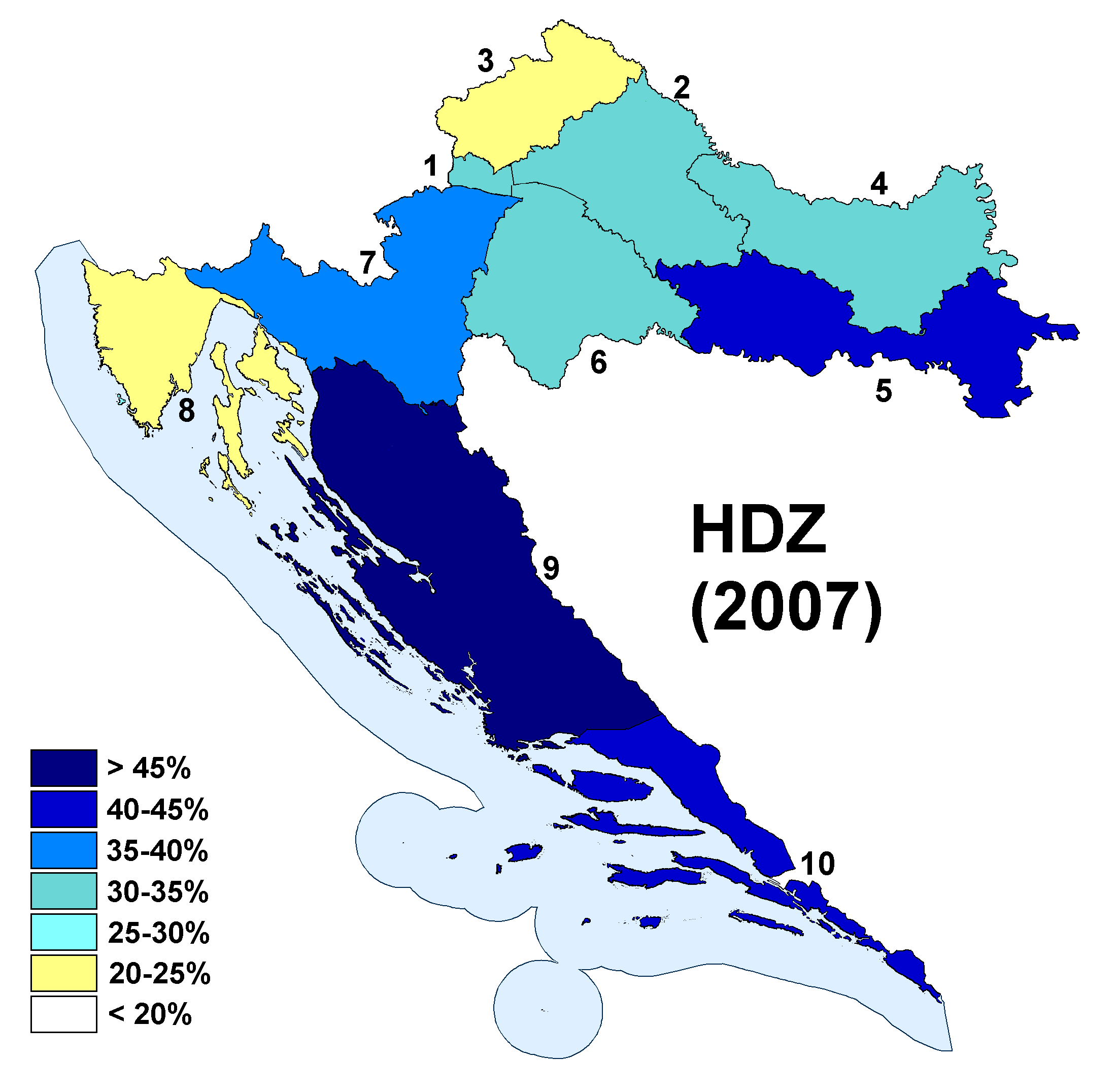
Croatian Democratic Union result

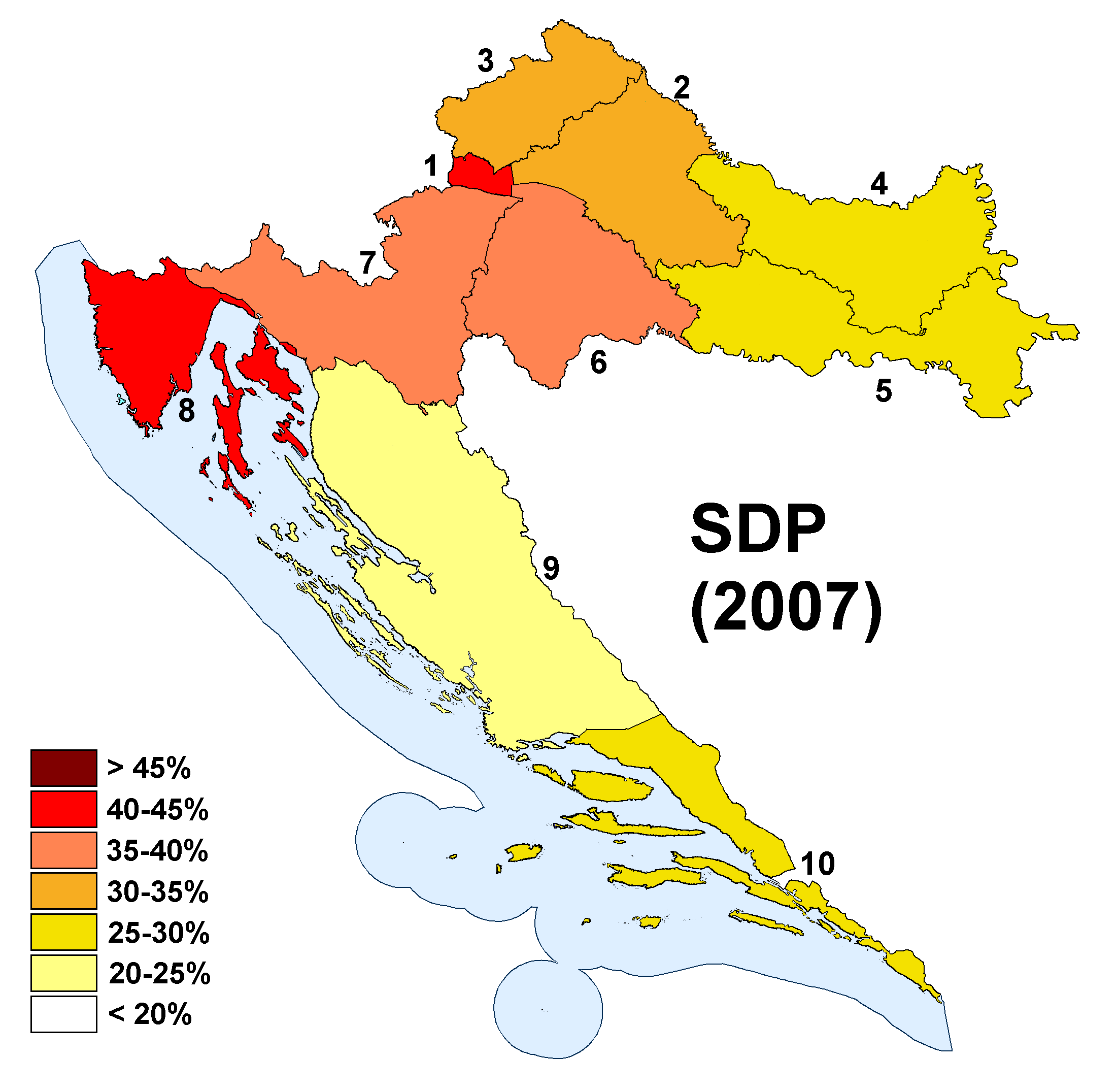
Social Democratic Party result

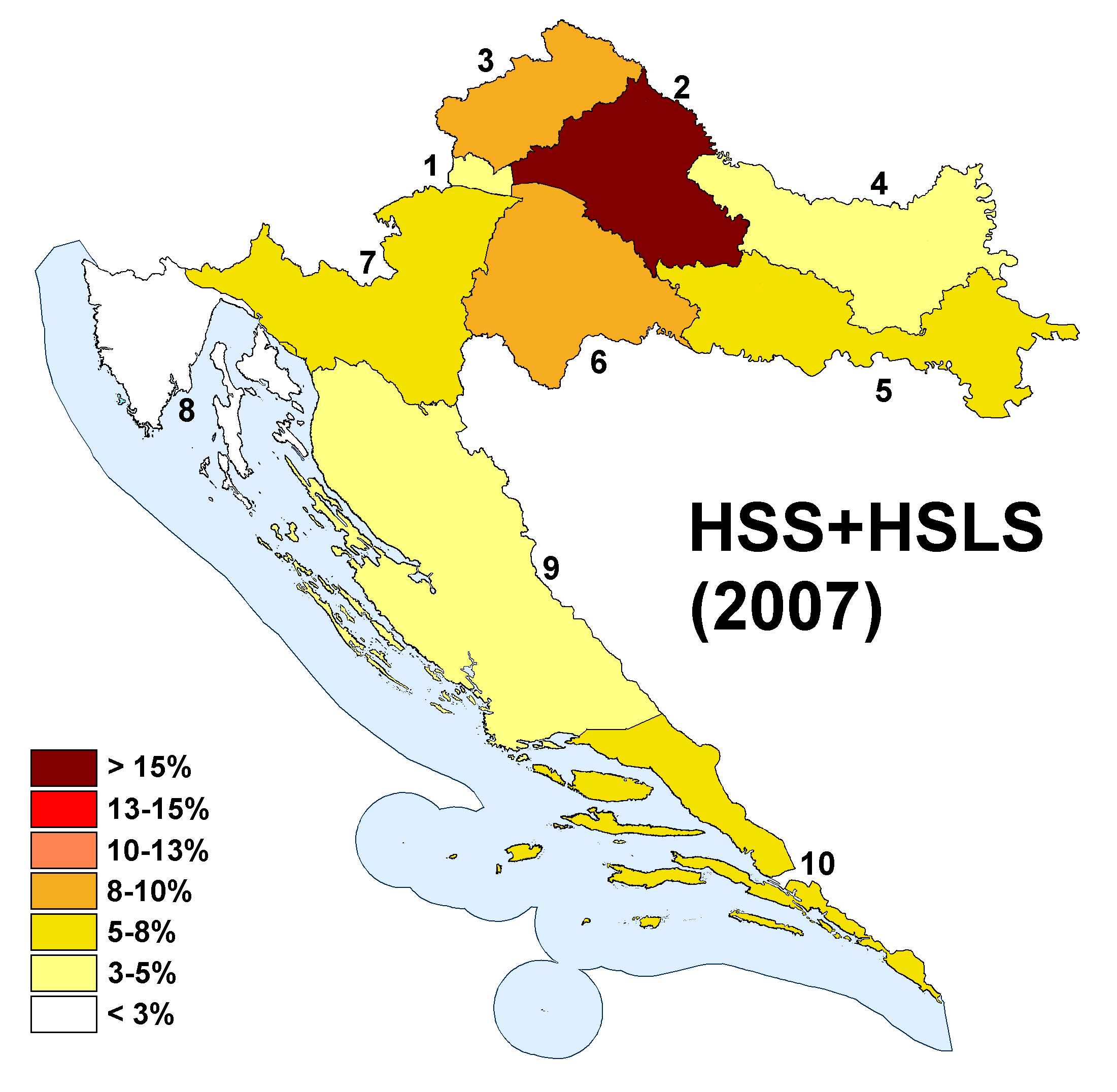
HSS–HSLS result

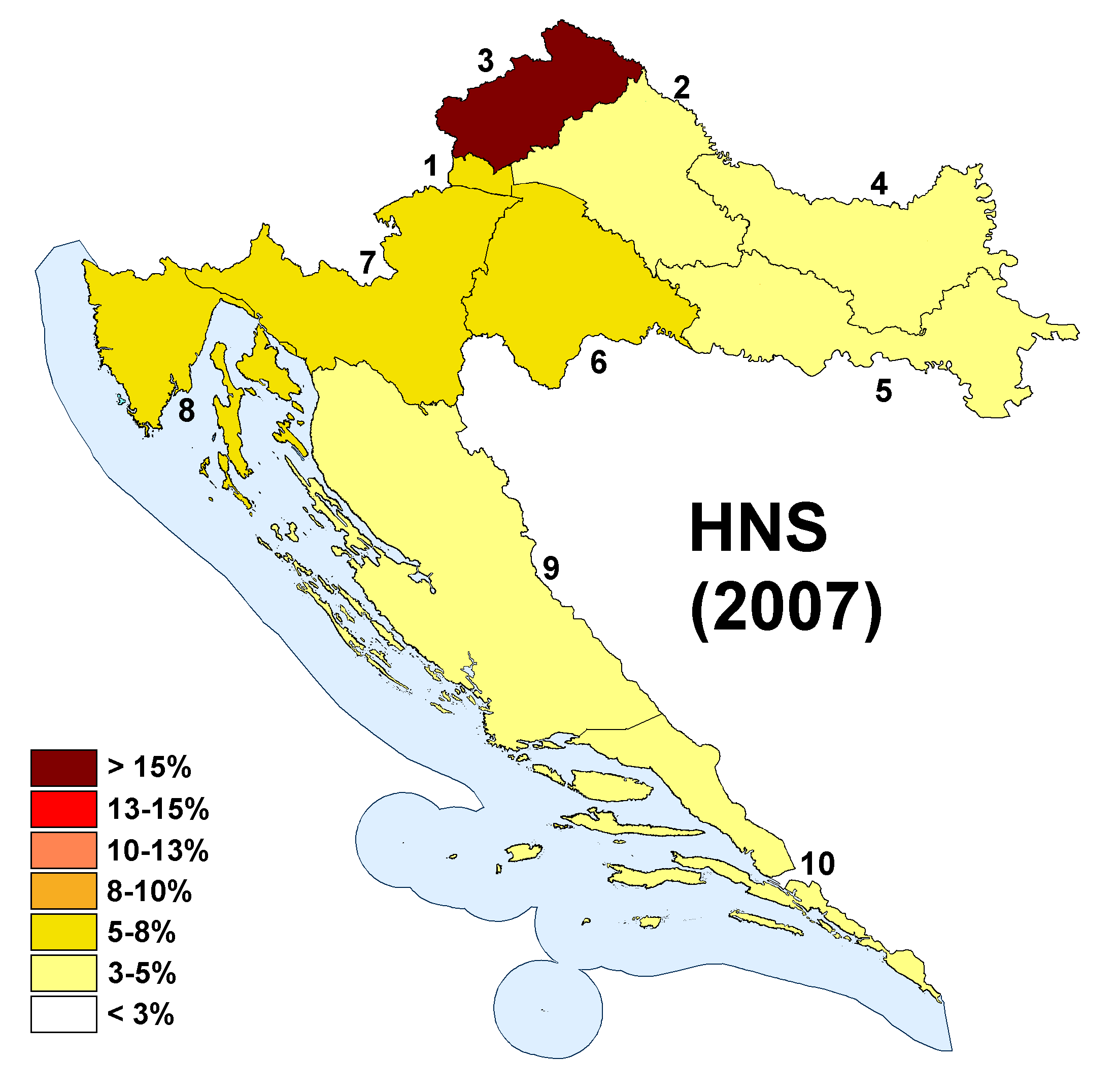
Croatian People's Party result

Most opinion polls in the days before the election predicted a very tight race between the governing Croatian Democratic Union and the opposition Social Democratic Party of Croatia. On the night of the election, after all the polls around the country closed, all major television networks released the results of the exit polls. All of them showed the social democrats with a slight lead. None of the exit polls, however, took into account the votes coming from the citizens living abroad, which tend to vote for the more conservative option. The first official results published at 9 p.m. showed HDZ with a slight lead. Ivo Sanader gave a victory speech close to midnight saying he will be forming the next government. Despite the election loss, SDP individually as a party achieved its best result ever, even better than the 2000 election result when SDP led a victorious coalition. Most smaller parties lost seats, the Croatian People's Party – Liberal Democrats lost 4 seats from the 2003 election, the Croatian Peasant Party also lost 4 seats and the far-right Croatian Party of Rights suffered its worst election results since the 1990s losing 7 seats and winning only 1.

National minorities elected 8 representatives through a separate election system: Milorad Pupovac (25,3% of votes), Vojislav Stanimirović (21,5%) and Ratko Gajica (15,8%) for the Serb national minority, Deneš Šoja (47,8%) for the Hungarian minority, Furio Radin (88,8%) for the Italian minority, Zdenka Čuhnil (26%) for the Czech and Slovak minorities, Nazif Memedi (12,8%) for the Austrian, Bulgarian, German, Jewish, Polish, Roma, Romanian, Rusyn, Russian, Turkish, Ukrainian, Vlach minorities and Šemso Tanković (30,9%) for the Albanian, Bosniak, Macedonian, Montenegrin and Slovene minorities.

Party	Votes	%	Seats
Croatian Democratic Union	907,743	36.62	66
Social Democratic Party	776,690	31.33	56
Croatian People's Party – Liberal Democrats	168,440	6.79	7
HSS–HSLS–ZS–ZDS–PGS	161,814	6.53	8
HSU–DSU	101,091	4.08	1
Croatian Party of Rights	86,865	3.50	1
Croatian Democratic Alliance of Slavonia and Baranja	44,552	1.80	3
Istrian Democratic Assembly	38,267	1.54	3
Democratic Centre–Greens	21,929	0.88	0
SU–ISDNS	21,882	0.88	0
Croatian Youth Party	16,247	0.66	0
Only Croatia – Movement for Croatia	15,902	0.64	0
Women's Democratic Party–Greens of Croatia	10,099	0.41	0
LJEVICA–SRP–HSD–ISDF	9,855	0.40	0
Independent Democratic Serb Party	9,115	0.37	0
Croatian Pure Party of Rights	8,943	0.36	0
Authentic Croatian Peasant Party	7,847	0.32	0
ASH–JSD–DSŽ–ZS–HRS	7,354	0.30	0
Green List	5,972	0.24	0
Youth Action	5,096	0.21	0
HKDS–KSU	3,370	0.14	0
Alphabet of Democracy	2,905	0.12	0
Croatian Rights–Croatian Rights Movement	2,697	0.11	0
PGS–SBHS–MDS–DLS	1,896	0.08	0
Economic Party	1,784	0.07	0
Democratic Party of the Slavonian Plain	1,626	0.07	0
Croatian Christian Democratic Union	1,575	0.06	0
Croatian Democratic Peasant Party	1,553	0.06	0
Croatian Party of the Unemployed	1,132	0.05	0
Croatian Christian Democratic Party	1,104	0.04	0
Croatian European Party	767	0.03	0
Croatian Assembly	588	0.02	0
Green Alternative–Consumer Party	505	0.02	0
Croatian Demochristians	417	0.02	0
Homeland Civic Party	390	0.02	0
My Little Međimurje	346	0.01	0
Rule of Law Alliance	294	0.01	0
Croatian Veterans' Party	286	0.01	0
Independents	30,106	1.21	0
National minorities			8
Total	2,479,044	100.00	153
Valid votes	2,479,044	98.54	
Invalid/blank votes	36,627	1.46	
Total votes	2,515,671	100.00	
Registered voters/turnout	4,229,681	59.48	
Source: State Election Committee

=== Turnout ===
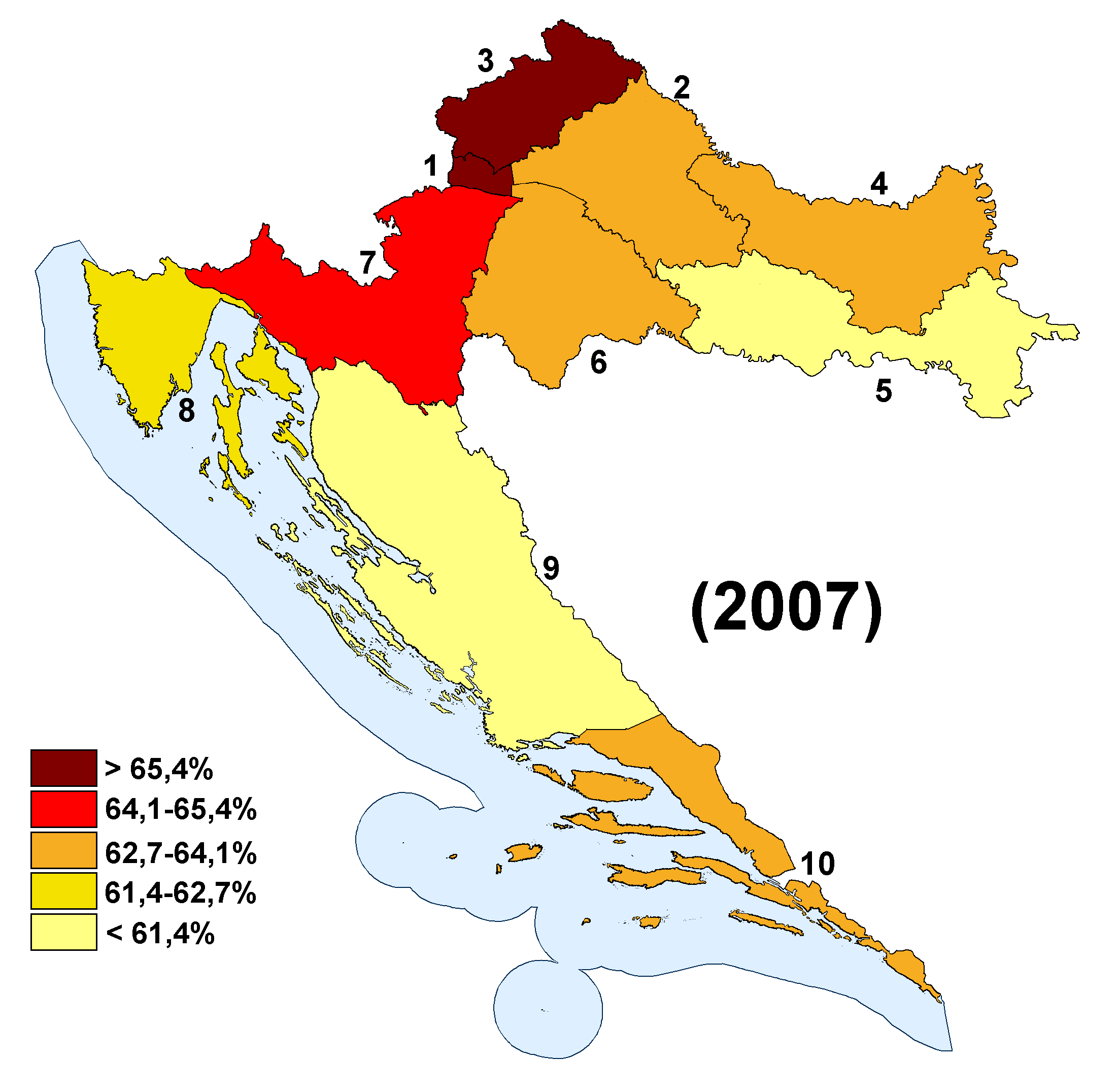
Election turnout for each electoral district

District	I	II	III	IV	V	VI	VII	VIII	IX	X	XI	Total
Total voters	361,236	399,648	366,005	335,091	372,163	356,575	403,812	385,594	426,199	416,017	404,950	4,227,290
Votes cast	243,980	254,571	249,111	211,839	216,335	224,986	264,795	240,250	259,018	264,193	90,482	2,519,560
Valid votes	243,480	254,269	249,041	211,426	215,937	224,554	264,232	239,987	258,593	263,372	90,402	2,515,293
Turnout	67.4%	63.6%	68.0%	63.1%	58.0%	63.0%	65.4%	62.2%	60.7%	63.3%	22.3%	59.5%

=== By electoral district ===
District	I	II	III	IV	V	VI	VII	VIII	IX	X
HDZ	31.03%	31.83%	23.85%	31.20%	42.75%	34.23%	35.14%	21.16%	52.09%	44.54%
SDP	42.07%	33.33%	30.79%	26.80%	26.69%	36.08%	36.90%	40.99%	22.63%	28.27%
HNS	6.43%	4.47%	25.34%	4.64%	4.31%	5.42%	5.52%	5.21%	3.79%	4.83%
HSS–HSLS	4.38%	16.53%	9.95%	4.04%	5.54%	8.27%	6.49%	2.93%	3.29%	5.71%
HSU	4.87%	4.29%	3.53%	4.89%	3.71%	4.44%	4.53%	5.85%	3.38%	3.03%
HSP	2.40%	2.93%	1.67%	7.98%	5.19%	3.44%	3.25%	1.81%	3.43%	3.49%
HDSSB	—	—	—	15.23%	6.00%	—	—	—	—	—
IDS	—	—	—	—	—	—	—	16.18%	—	—

== Government formation ==
On night of the elections, after first seat projections were announced, the president of the Croatian Democratic Union announced that he spoke with the President of the Republic and that he will be forming the government. A few minutes after him, the president of the Social Democratic Party informed the public that he too spoke with president and that he too was commencing the formation of the government.

President Mesić explained that his constitutional obligation was to give a mandate to form a government to a person who presents him with convincing proof that they have support of a majority of the newly elected parliament. As the president failed to announce that he will give the mandate to Ivo Sanader, leader of the party with the most seats in the parliament, he was criticised by many for complicating the situation and starting a political crisis. President Mesić responded that he was following article 97 of the Constitution of Croatia.

HDZ, together with HSU and Roma national minority member Nazif Memedi had 68 of 77 seats required for a majority while SDP, HNS, IDS and SDA together had 67 seats. Therefore, the HSS-HSLS coalition which had 8 seats was instrumental in forming a government. Before the elections, leaders of the coalition stated that they will first speak with the party which wins the most seats (not counting diaspora seats). As this turned out to be HDZ, negotiations between HDZ and HSS-HSLS of a coalition started on 3 December.

Although HSS-HSLS started negotiating with HDZ, the president of SDP Milanović refused to give up and still claimed that SDP was also in a process of forming of a government because SDP, HNS, IDS and SDA won 150 thousand votes more than HDZ (not counting diaspora). HDSSB had declared support for SDP if SDP-formed government will work "in the interest of Slavonia and Baranja", but Milanović stated that he firmly believed that SDP will form the government even without support from HDSSB. Although up until 25 November Ljubo Jurčić still claimed that he was SDP's candidate for premier, on 30 November Milanović announced that he was assuming responsibility for forming SDP-led government. Jurčić confirmed that he thinks that "responsibility for functioning of the government should be distributed among heads of parties and that is the best concept in this circumstances". Heads of HSS-HSLS coalition Adlešič and Friščić declared this decision to be "very important and could influence their decision about who they will support". Adlešić added that Milanović is "much better premier candidate than Jurčić and that SDP would probably have better election results if Milanović made this decision earlier".

On 12 December it was announced that coalition talks between HDZ and the HSS-HSLS were close to completion and the odds of HSS-HSLS entering into discussions with SDP were announced by Božidar Pankretić as very low. Three days later, President Mesić held a second round of consultations with parliamentary parties and was reassured that HDZ and HSS-HSLS are finishing their negotiations. Mesić considered that a proof that Sanader had support of the majority of Sabor and handed him a mandate to form a government. Following that announcement, Milanović again reiterated that SDP still hasn't given up on forming a government. Sanader described this behaviour as "not fitting the democratic standards" and that president would have much easier job if SDP just acknowledged their defeat.

The first session of the newly elected parliament was called for 11 January 2008, and on 12 January, the parliament approved Sanader's cabinet.

Government	Opposition
Croatian Democratic Union (HDZ) Croatian Peasant Party (HSS) Croatian Social Liberal Party (HSLS) Minorities	Social Democratic Party of Croatia (SDP) Croatian People's Party - Liberal Democrats (HNS) Istrian Democratic Assembly (IDS) Croatian Democratic Alliance of Slavonija and Baranja (HDSSB) Croatian Party of Pensioners (HSU) Croatian Party of Rights (HSP)
