= Nikola Vuljanić =

Croatian politician (1949–2024)

Member of the European Parliament for Croatia
- In office 1 July 2013 – 1 July 2014

Personal details
- Born: 25 June 1949 Karlovac, PR Croatia, FPR Yugoslavia (modern Croatia)
- Died: 2 March 2024 (aged 74) Karlovac, Croatia
- Party: Croatian Labourists – Labour Party
- Education: University of Zagreb

Nikola Vuljanić (25 June 1949 – 2 March 2024) was a Croatian politician, member of the left-wing Croatian Labour Party, and former member of the European Parliament.

== Early life ==
Nikola Vuljanić was born in Karlovac, and graduated at the University of Zagreb with an MA in philology. He started to work in education as an English language school teacher. Afterwards, he became a university teacher of technical English.

== Political career ==
In 2003, he joined Croatian People's Party (HNS), being elected member of Croatian Parliament, staying in office until 2007.

After the first deputy term, he left HNS and joined Croatian Labour Party (HL). In 2011, Vuljanić was re-elected as member of Croatian Parliament on HL ticket. In 2012, he resigned his seat in Sabor, and was elected euro-observer in the European Parliament. On 1 July 2013, after Croatia joins the European Union, he was sworn in as full MEP.

=== In the Croatian Sabor ===
In the 5th legislature (2003-2008), he was a member of the Committee on Legislation, Judiciary Committee, Interparliamentary Cooperation, and a deputy member of the Croatian Parliament Delegation to the Joint Parliamentary Committee EU-Croatia and the Delegation to the Parliamentary Assembly of the Organization for Security and Co-operation. Vuljanić was a member of the parliamentary group of the Croatian People's Party-Liberal Democrats (HNS).

=== As euro-observer and MEP ===
On 1 April 2012, Vuljanić was appointed by the Sabor to be an observer in the European Parliament. He became a member of the Committee for Culture. Serving as non-attached member few days, on 18 April 2012, Vuljanić finally joined the Group of the Progressive Alliance of Socialists and Democrats in the European Parliament (S&D). He was elected as Member of the European Parliament (MEP) in European election of 14 April 2013, on HL's lists, winning the term with 5.77% of popular votes. On 1 July 2013, after Croatia joins the European Union, Vuljanić was sworn in as full MEP. After becoming full MEP, he left S&D group to join Confederal Group of the European United Left - Nordic Green Left, and was moved to the Committee on Foreign Affairs.

== Death ==
Vuljanić died in Karlovac on 2 March 2024, at the age of 74.
