= Dalmatian Liberal Party =

Political party in Croatia

Logo of the Dalmatian Liberal Party (Dalmatinska Liberalna Stranka)

The Dalmatian Liberal Party (Croatian: Dalmatinska liberalna stranka, DLS) was a regional left-wing liberal political party in Croatia formed by dissident members of the Liberal Party. The party was founded on April 4, 2005, and its membership in 2006 was estimated at 160.

A number of dissidents, led by Ante Tešija, then president of the Split city branch of the Liberal Party, disagreed with the party's central committee in Zagreb on the proposed reunification of the party with the Croatian Social Liberal Party. After this unification took place, Tešija and the other dissidents formed the new party. Its members are largely former members of the Liberal Party from Split and the surrounding area.

Tešija became president of the DLS. In the last local elections the party got 1,873 votes (1.2%) in Split-Dalmatia County. The party's stated program includes opposition to overbuilding on the Adriatic coast, prosecution of industrial pollution, and greater government spending on education and health care.

In the 2007 elections for Parliament that were held on 25 November 2007, DLS ran in the 9th and 10th electorate. The party got disappointing results of only 344 votes (0.13%) in the 10th electorate and 400 votes (0.16%) in the 9th electorate, finishing among the last few parties.

In 2009 the party merged with Croatian People's Party – Liberal Democrats.

== Electoral history ==
Election	In coalition with	Votes won	Percentage	Seats won	Change
2007	None	744	0.03%	0 / 151	Steady
