= Pirate Party (Croatia) =

Pirate Party Piratska stranka
- President: Maša Utković
- Vice president: Marko Sučić
- Founded: April 13, 2012
- Dissolved: 2018
- Headquarters: Zagreb, Croatia
- Membership: ~200
- Ideology: Pirate politics Freedom of information Privacy; Copyright reform Social progressivism
- International affiliation: Pirate Parties International
- Slogan: Uvesti politiku u 21. stoljeće i 21. stoljeće u politiku. (To introduce politics into the 21st century and the 21st century into politics.)
- Seats in Sabor: 0 / 151
- European Parliament: 0 / 12

The Pirate Party (Croatian: Piratska Stranka), short - Pirates (Croatian: Pirati) was a political party in Croatia founded in March 2012 and the Croatian section of the Pirate Parties International movement. It follows the example of the Swedish Pirate Party as a party of the information society and it fights for freedom of information and the protection of privacy. The party was removed from the state registry of political parties by 2018.

== Electoral results ==
=== European Parliament ===
Election	# of overall votes	% of overall vote	# of overall seats won	Position
2013	8,345	1.13	0 / 12	12th
2014	3,623	0.39	0 / 11	13th
