= Far-right politics in Croatia =

Graffiti on a wall in Croatia in 2006, which says "We'll give everything, but won't give Bobetko!", as well as the logo of the Ustaše and the acronym for the Independent State of Croatia.

Far-right politics in Croatia (Croatian: Krajnje desna politika) refers to any manifestation of far-right politics in Croatia. Individuals and groups in Croatia that employ far-right politics are most often associated with the historical Ustaše movement, hence they have connections to Neo-Nazism and neo-fascism. That World War II political movement was an extremist organization at the time supported by the German Nazis and the Italian Fascists. The association with the Ustaše has been called "Neo-Ustashism" by Slavko Goldstein.

The common perception is that the far right includes people who were either involved with the Independent State of Croatia (NDH) during World War II; sympathizers; and people who utilise their symbolism. The far right mainly arose from a combination of the residual hatred from the Yugoslav wars and Croatian nationalism. Pro-Ustaša symbols and actions have been restricted by law in Croatia since 2003. The most common venue for expressing these beliefs is graffiti.

== Background ==
The Ustaše was a Croatian right-wing ultranationalist movement founded in 1929 by Ante Pavelić. The Ustaše lacked broad support in Croatia due to its radical and violent nature. When Nazi Germany invaded Yugoslavia in 1941, a German puppet-state, the Independent State of Croatia (NDH) was established and ruled by Pavelić and the Ustaše. During the Second World War, the Ustaše conducted genocide against Serbs, Roma and Jews within their borders. Several far-right political parties in Croatia trace their roots to Ante Starčević and view the NDH as a legitimate foundational state. Most openly declare their affiliation with the Ustaše. Across the right-wing spectrum, various common themes emerge with varying degrees of which include the desire for a Greater Croatia, a negative stance towards the ICTY, anti-Serbianism, positive view of the NDH and negative attitudes towards NATO and the European Union.

Za dom spremni ("Ready for the Homeland") was the WWII fascist salute used by the Ustaše and is considered to be the equivalent of the Nazi German Sieg heil. Since Croatia's independence, the salute has become "re-popularized" through public discourse by the right-wing.

== Early independent political scene ==
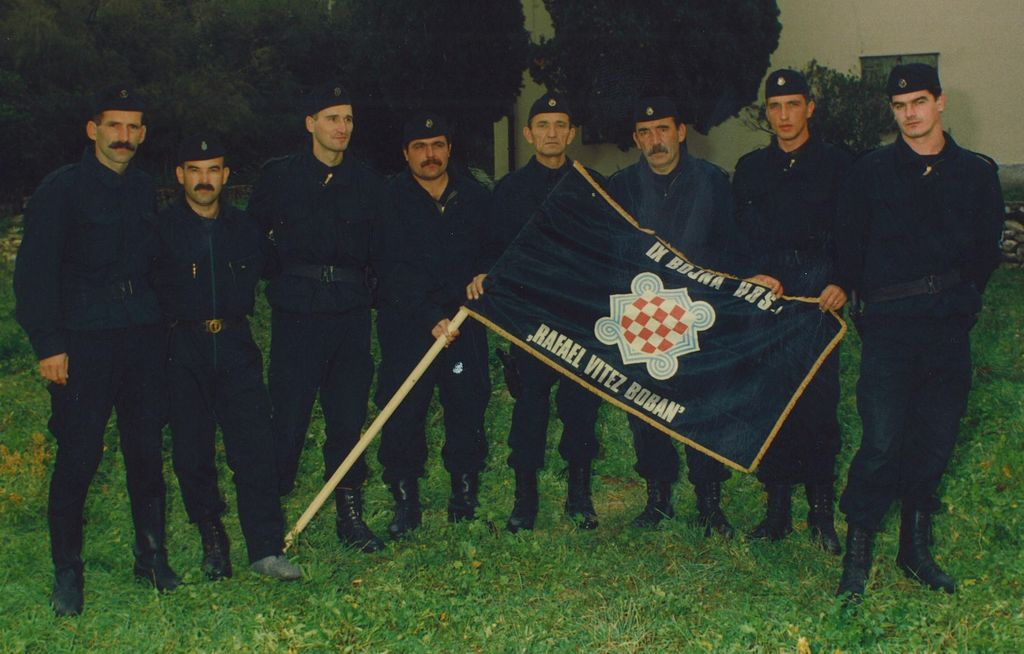
Members of the Croatian Defence Forces, the paramilitary arm of the Croatian Party of Rights

The introduction of the freedom of speech enabled public expression of far-right politics. Croatia has been accused of ignoring the crimes committed by the World War II-era fascist Ustaša regime, and of tolerating the symbols and the activities of individuals sympathetic to that regime. This has led to criticism of Croatia, particularly among Serbs, exacerbated with war-time propaganda for the Yugoslav Wars. The antagonism between the Croats and the Serbs grew, and had become widespread by the time the Croatian War of Independence had started. The Croatian-Serbian animosity during the Yugoslav wars was viewed by some as a rivalry between the "Ustaša" and the "Chetnik", even if both of these World War II-era organizations did not actually exist at the time.

Among the organizations formed during wartime which were most commonly associated with neo-Ustashism was the Croatian Defence Forces (Hrvatske obrambene snage, HOS), which emerged as the de facto paramilitary wing of the Croatian Party of Rights. Their symbols included dressing in black, at the time widely perceived to be reminiscent of blackshirts, and using the phrase Za dom spremni.

=== Defacement of monuments ===
From 1991 until 2010, around 3,000 monuments erected in honour of the Partisans have been damaged or destroyed throughout the country with little government response. Furthermore, the devastation of World War II partisan monuments also often extended to those erected in honor of civilian victims of war, also with little or no intervention from the police. The defacements occurred during a period when communist parties lost power in much of Eastern Europe.

== Political parties ==
=== Active ===
- The Croatian Party of Rights (HSP), far-right with a blend of ultra-nationalism and free market economics. Gained 7% of votes in the 1992 Croatian parliamentary election and five seats in the Croatian parliament. Since then it has attracted less support. The HSP's military wing, the Croatian Defence Forces (HOS), participated in the Croatian War of Independence and openly displayed Ustaše symbols.
- The Croatian Pure Party of Rights (HČSP), far-right or neo-fascist and ultranationalist, founded by Ivan Gabelica and Nedeljko Gabelica. A marginal party with some representation in local municipalities. It holds an annual event on 10 April to celebrate the establishment of the NDH. It also protests the Pride parade and commemorations for Ustaše victims.
- The Homeland Movement (DP), right-wing nationalist or far-right party founded by folk singer Miroslav Škoro.

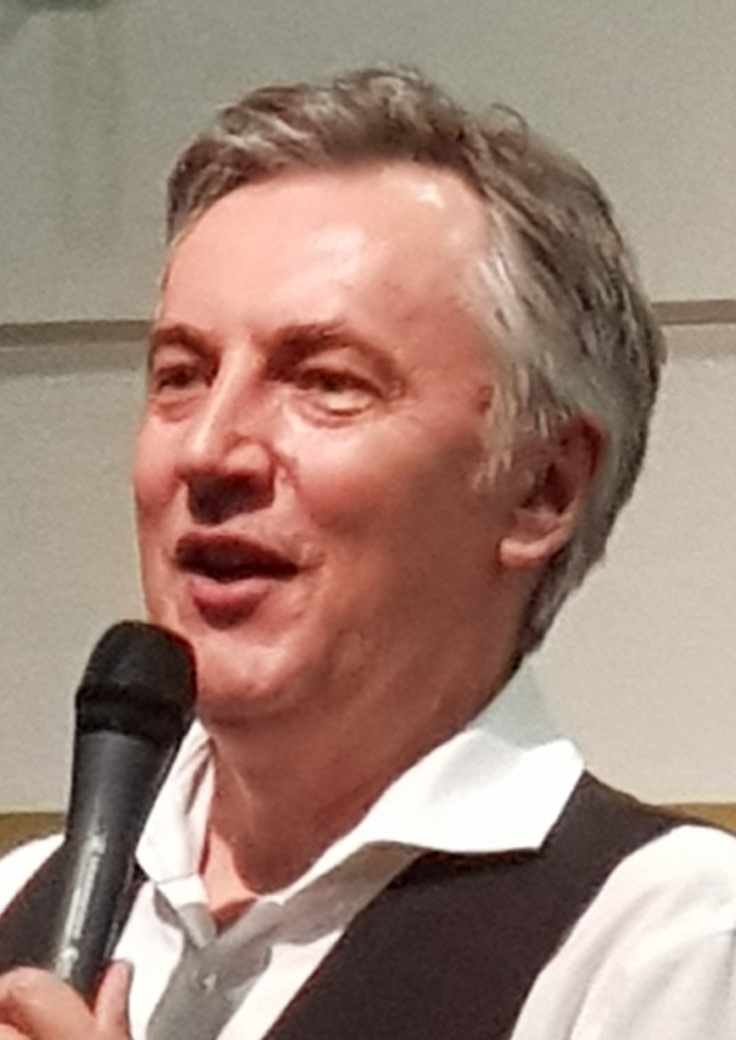
Miroslav Škoro, the founder and first leader of the Homeland Movement

The coalition led by the Homeland Movement came third at the 2020 parliamentary election, winning 10.89% of the vote and 16 seats. The abortion debate was one of the leading topics during political debates, while the Homeland Movement advocated a ban on abortion.

=== Defunct ===
- The Croatian Democratic Party of Rights (HDSP), extreme-right or neo-fascist, founded by Krešimir Pavelić that was active during the 1990s.
- The National Democratic League (NDL), extreme-right or neo-fascist, led by Ivan Vekić.
- Croatian Block (HB), extreme-right and militant, founded in 2004 and disbanded in 2009.

== Post-war political scene ==
=== WWII genocide denial ===
Remembrance ceremonies at the site of Jasenovac concentration camp resumed, with support from the highest levels of government, including the right-wing HDZ under Ivo Sanader. The conservative parties such as the Croatian Party of Rights (HSP) and the Croatian Democratic Union (HDZ) permeated in their support for extreme forms of nationalism and far-right ideas. Croatia's far-right often advocates the false theory that Jasenovac was a "labour camp" where mass murder did not take place. The ideas promoted by its members have been amplified by mainstream media interviews and book tours.

Parties like the Croatian Party of Rights which are most commonly associated with Ustašism generally aren't able to attract support from more than a few percent of the population (HSP coalition won 6.4% of the national popular vote in the 2003 election and 3.5% in the 2007 election). The HSP's image of "pro-Ustaša" was repetitively shunned by its leaders in an attempt to sway more votes. The Croatian Pure Party of Rights openly praises the Ustaše regime, though the party does not meet the minimum number of votes needed to enter Parliament.

On 11 July 2003 the Ivica Račan coalition government passed amendments to the penal code which outlawed hate speech. The law has not perfectly applied.

=== Graffiti ===
The conflation of modern and obsolete nationalist themes sometimes produces bizarre inconsistencies, as shown at picture on the right: at the time when the ICTY wanted Croatian general Janko Bobetko, the right-wing part of the public was adamant in its demands to prevent that, and some extremist painted graffiti saying so, together with neo-fascist symbols. At the same time, Bobetko was quite clearly not a neo-fascist himself, because his family was killed by the Ustaše, and he fought against them.

=== Names of squares and streets ===
A square in the central part of Zagreb had been named the "Square of the victims of fascism" (Trg žrtava fašizma) because during World War II, over sixteen thousand people had been deported via the square to concentration camps. In the early 1990s, this square was renamed to "Square of great Croats" (Trg hrvatskih velikana). This decision was later walked back in December 2000 during Milan Bandić's mayoralty of Zagreb.

In several Croatian cities, streets were renamed after Mile Budak, a prominent Ustaša ideologist, on the basis that he was otherwise a writer. In 2003, Ivo Sanader's government decided to rename all the streets bearing Budak's name. In 2004, a plaque commemorating Budak's birth in the village of Sveti Rok was removed by the same authorities. In November 2016 in Jasenovac, a plaque with the slogan "Za dom spremni" was unveiled.

== Popular culture ==
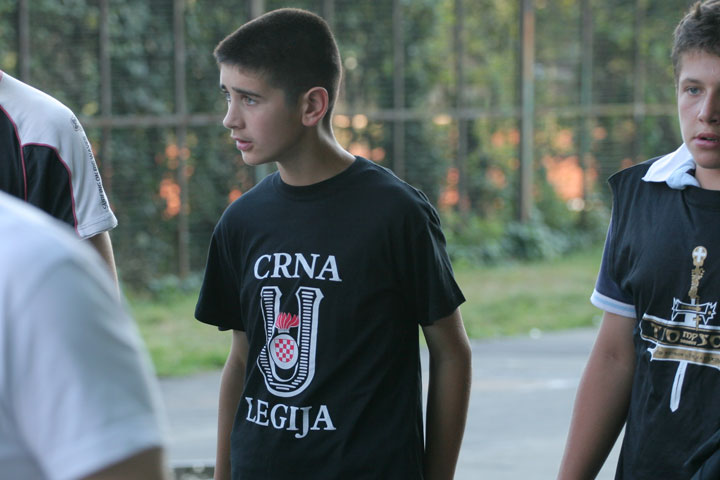
Young boy wearing a shirt with a Black Legion, Ustaše Militia sign at the Thompson concert

In the world of popular culture, Croatian singer Marko Perković (known as Thompson) is a symbol of Croatian nationalism and far-right politics. It has been widely alleged that he achieved such large attendances with the support of right-wing political organizations who helped rally people to the concerts. Thompson himself has denied he has anything to do with Nazism numerous times, and called the campaign against him cheap propaganda, saying he was merely a proud Croatian.

== Sports ==
In October 2007, the Croatian newspaper Slobodna Dalmacija reported that NK Imotski's official clothing items featured Ustaša-related symbols (The letter U and the Independent State of Croatia-resembling coat of arms inside the letter. That was, in fact, the logo of the club's leading sponsor, the edile company gUj (meaning "Gojko Und Jure"). Some historians and critics claim the symbols display is an open praising of the Ustaše. The club's president, Nediljko Tolo, said: "As long as the sponsor finances our club, we will carry those symbols on our dresses". In early November 2007, the Croatian Second League Association announced that NK Imotski violated FIFA, Croatian Football Federation rules and laws of the Republic of Croatia. NK Imotski had to end a sponsorship deal with gUj until the company changes its logo. NK Imotski had to find new uniforms for the players and remove all gUj advertisements around the stadium.

In June 2012, the Croatian and German football federations were fined for singing songs associated with Nazism and wearing Nazi symbols. In November 2013, after the FIFA World Cup 2014 Qualification match between Croatia and Iceland, the Croatian defender of Australian descent, Josip Šimunić, reportedly celebrated and motivated the crowd with the Ustashe chant "Za dom, Spremni" upon Croatian qualification to the 2014 FIFA World Cup. Simunic was disciplined by FIFA in December with a ten-match suspension and a fine of CHF 30,000.

== Croatian Wikipedia ==
In the period from 2013 to 2021, the Croatian Wikipedia received attention from international media for promoting a far-right worldview, including anti-LGBT propaganda and bias against Serbs of Croatia by the means of historical denialism and by negating or diluting the severity of crimes committed by the Ustaše regime.

== See also ==
- Anti-Cyrillic protests in Croatia
- Anti-Serb sentiment
- Far-right politics in Serbia
- Left-wing politics in Croatia
- Liberalism in Croatia
- List of neo-Nazi organizations
- Radical right in Europe
