= Ivan Vilibor Sinčić =

Croatian political activist

Ivan Vilibor Sinčić MEP
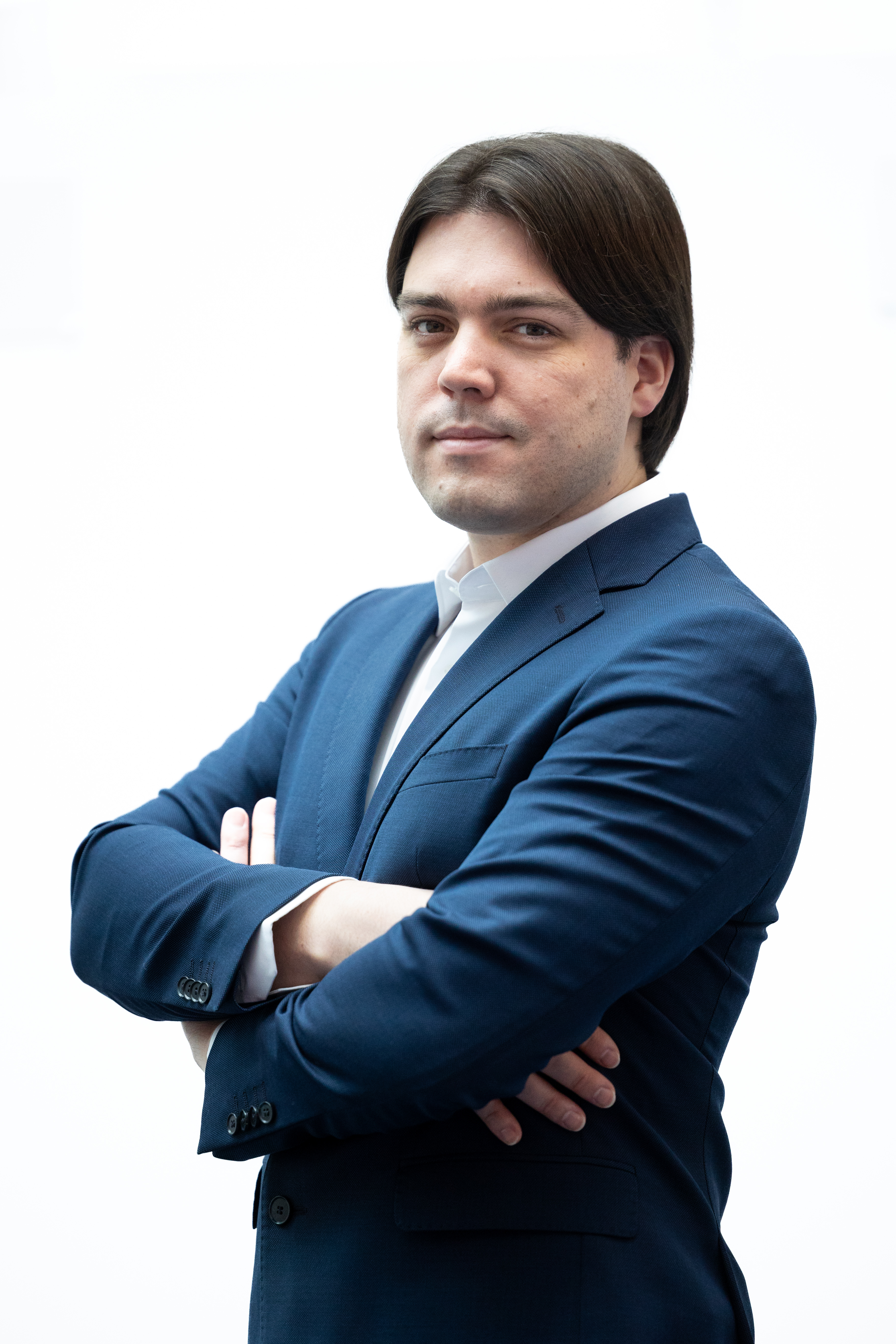

Member of the European Parliament for Croatia
- In office 2 July 2019 – 15 July 2024

Member of the Croatian Parliament for the 7th electoral district
- In office 28 December 2015 – 2 July 2019
- Preceded by: 15 July 2024

Chairman of Živi zid/Key of Croatia
- In office 2 June 2011 – 3 March 2024
- Preceded by: Position established
- Succeeded by: Position abolished

Personal details
- Born: 28 August 1990 (age 36) Karlovac, SR Croatia, SFR Yugoslavia (modern Croatia)
- Party: ŽZ/KLJUČ (2011–2024); PiP (since 2024)
- Spouse: Vladimira Palfi (m. 2016)
- Children: 2
- Education: Zagreb Faculty of Electrical Engineering and Computing
- Occupation: Politician; Anti-eviction activist
- Profession: Electrical engineer

Ivan Vilibor Sinčić (born 28 August 1990), is a Croatian politician and anti-eviction activist. He served as chairman of the Key of Croatia party (formerly known as Human Shield) and as a member of the European Parliament from 2019 to 2024.

== Biography ==
Sinčić was born in Karlovac. He completed his undergraduate studies at the Faculty of Electrical Engineering in Zagreb.

In 2016, he married fellow Human Shield activist and former party co-chairwoman Vladimira Palfi. They have a son named Ksaver and a daughter called Iskra.

Along with former-fellow MP Ivan Pernar, Sinčić was one of the founders of Human Shield in 2011.

Sinčić was a candidate in the first round of the 2014 Croatian presidential election, coming in third with 16.42% of the vote.

He was first elected a Member of the Croatian Parliament in the 2015 parliamentary election, from the 7th electoral district, and took office on 28 December 2015. He was reelected to Parliament in the 2016 parliamentary election.

On 26 May 2019, he was elected to the European Parliament but announced he would not take up his seat. On 4 June 2019, the presidency of his party decided that Sinčić would still occupy his seat in the European Parliament because he won the most preferential votes in the elections held on 26 May 2019.

== Views ==
It has been stated that he "believes in abolishing private banks". Sinčić was against Croatian government decision to grant 3600 HRK (approx. 486€) of monthly financial aid to Ukrainian refugees arriving to Croatia.
