= Autochthonous Croatian Party of Rights =

Autochthonous Croatian Party of Rights Autohtona-Hrvatska stranka prava
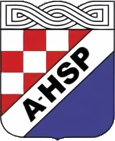
- Leader: Dražen Keleminec
- Founded: 2005
- Headquarters: Zagreb
- Ideology: Croatian nationalism; Neo-Nazism; Croatian irredentism; Social conservatism; Anti-communism; Euroscepticism; Anti-abortion; Anti-LGBT; Opposition to NATO; Anti-Serb sentiment
- Political position: Far-right

Website
- http://hrvatskipravasi.hr/

The Autochthonous Croatian Party of Rights (Croatian: Autohtona-Hrvatska stranka prava or A-HSP) is a far-right, socially conservative political party in Croatia, founded in Koprivnica in 2005, after the merging of Croatian Rightists and Croatian Right Movement. The goal of the Movement is to unite all "rightist" parties in Croatia such as the HSP, the HSP 1861, the HČSP and others. It was very critical of the HSP's political positions until 2009.

A-HSP is pro-life and advocates against gay marriage. It is strongly against Croatian accession to EU and NATO and advocates for irredentism in Bosnia and Herzegovina, the Bay of Kotor, Syrmia, and Bačka.

The party changed its name from United Supporters of the Croatian Party of Rights Movement to Autochthonous Croatian Party of Rights in 2009.

In the 2013 European Parliament election, A-HSP received 2,350 votes (0.32%), which was not enough to gain a seat.

In 2015, the Croatian Minister of the Interior, Ranko Ostojić, banned the party's rally at Zagreb's Ban Jelačić Square.

In 2017, the party organized a march through the Croatian capital in order to show their support and declare allegiance to then-recently elected American president Donald Trump. During the march, the party's members, dressed in black uniforms, were waving flags of the German neo-Nazi National Democratic Party and of the United States while shouting the Ustaša salute Za dom spremni. After the rally, the party's leader Dražen Keleminec was arrested by the police for disturbing the public peace and quiet. The Government of Croatia condemned the rally the same day for promoting Ustašism and Nazism. The following day, the U.S. embassy in Zagreb reacted by publishing a statement in which they strongly condemned the march and rejected any attempts to connect the U.S. with Ustaša ideology.

In April 2018, the leader of the party, Dražen Keleminec, was arrested near the former concentration camp Jasenovac for disturbing public peace and quiet, and insulting police officers.

== Election results ==
=== Legislative ===
| Election | In coalition with | Votes | Percentage | Seats won | Change | Government |
|---|---|---|---|---|---|---|
| 2011 | None | 5,768 | 0.25% | 0 / 151 | New | Extra-parliamentary |
| 2015 | None | 12,027 | 0.55% | 0 / 151 | 0 | Extra-parliamentary |
| 2016 | None | 6,276 | 0.33% | 0 / 151 | 0 | Extra-parliamentary |
| 2020 | None | 5,343 | 0.32% | 0 / 151 | 0 | Extra-parliamentary |
| 2024 | None | 6,291 | 0.30% | 0 / 151 | 0 | Extra-parliamentary |

=== European Parliament ===
| Election | List leader | Coalition | Votes | % | Seats | +/– | EP Group |
| Election | List leader | Coalition | Coalition | | A-HSP | | EP Group |
|---|---|---|---|---|---|---|---|
| 2013 | Diana Kobas Dešković | None | 2,350 | 0.32 (#26) | 0 / 12 | New | – |
| 2014 | Dražen Keleminec | None | 3,455 | 0.37 (#14) | 0 / 11 | 0 | – |
| 2019 | Dražen Keleminec | None | 4,391 | 0.40 (#18) | 0 / 12 | 0 | – |
| 2024 | Dražen Keleminec | None | 1,402 | 0.19 (#16) | 0 / 12 | 0 | – |
