= The Key of Croatia =

The Key of Croatia Ključ Hrvatske
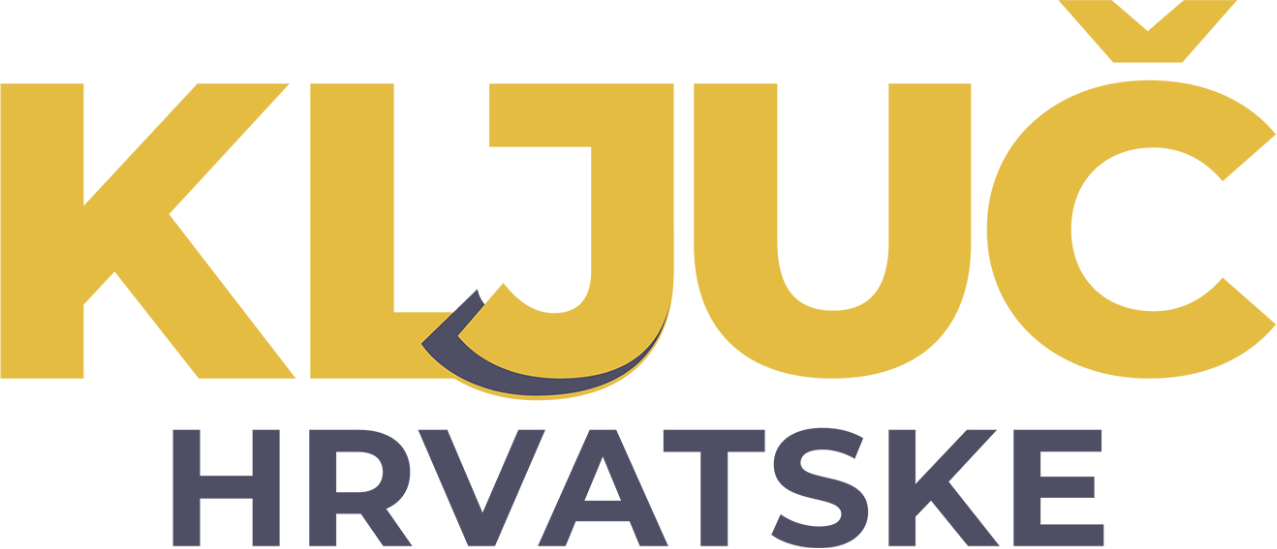
- Abbreviation: KLJUČ
- President: Ivan Vilibor Sinčić
- Founder: Ivan Pernar
- Founded: 2 June 2011
- Dissolved: 3 March 2024
- Merged into: Law and Justice
- Headquarters: Savska cesta 41; Zagreb, Croatia
- Membership (2023): 12,580
- Ideology: Populism; Euroscepticism; Anti-establishment
- European affiliation: EAFD (2020–2023); 5SDD (2019)
- European Parliament group: Non-Inscrits
- Colours: Gold; Grey

Website
- kljuchrvatske.hr

The Key of Croatia (Croatian: Ključ Hrvatske) was a populist political party in Croatia.

Until the party changed its name on 21 May 2022, it was known as Human Shield (Croatian: Živi zid, lit. 'Living Wall') and was formed out of an anti-eviction group of the same name. The group opposed foreclosures by occupying property and forming a "human shield", hence the name.

The party was founded on 2 June 2011 as the Alliance for Change (Croatian: Savez za promjene). and operated under that name until it became Human Shield in 2014 ahead of the 2014–15 presidential election, supporting the candidacy of Ivan Vilibor Sinčić.

The party refused to be characterized as being left or right and claimed adherence to humanist values.

On February 3, 2024, the party merged with the Let's Change Croatia party and the independent list of Mislav Kolakušić into the Law and Justice. The party's previous president, Ivan Vilibor Sinčić, became the vice president of the newly formed option.

== Ideology and principles ==
The party has been described as having "praised the writings of David Icke" and "pushed a number of conspiracy theories about chemtrails and vaccinations". An article for the magazine Jacobin by Juraj Katalenac described the party as a populist group that "is often portrayed as part of the left, but it offers more conspiracies theories than progressive policies".

The party believes that the current monetary system is unfair and unsustainable because it is based on money as debt, i.e. all the money in circulation comes as a loan with an interest rate that never went into circulation (only principal did), which is, according to the party, the cause of many evictions in Croatia.

The party stands for:

- realization of the monetary sovereignty of the Republic of Croatia and the implementation of a non-credit monetary system;
- implementation of a fair and efficient judicial system, and in particular the prohibition of inhumane and unconstitutional enforcement procedures, enforcement of the only home and secret procedures of state bodies;
- respecting the dignity, freedoms and rights of citizens, regardless of religious and ethnic affiliation, age, gender or social status;
- the development of a just society, and especially the protection of citizens from the oppressive, corrupt and arbitrary actions of state bodies;
- protection of cultural and natural heritage and human environment;
- realization of the guaranteed rights of people to health care, education, social care, work, family and other rights;
- realization and protection of the rights of workers, people who live from work and on the basis of their work;
- implementation of renewable energy sources;
- protection of animal rights.

== Electoral results ==
=== Presidential elections ===
Presidency of Croatia
Election year	Candidate	First Round		Second Round	
Election year	Candidate	# of overall votes	% of overall vote	# of overall votes	% of overall vote
2014–15	Ivan Vilibor Sinčić	293,570	16.4 (#3)		
2019–20	endorsed Mislav Kolakušić	111,916	5.95 (#4)		

=== Parliament (Sabor) ===
Election	In coalition with	Votes won	Percentage	Seats won	Change	Government
Election	In coalition with	(Coalition totals)		(ŽZ only)		Government
2011 (December)	(as Savez za promjene) A-HSS, DPS	15,379	0.63	0 / 151	0	Extra-parliamentary opposition
2015 (November)	None	94,877	4.24 (#4)	1 / 151	▲1	Opposition
2016 (September)	Let's Change Croatia, Youth Action, Alphabet of Democracy, HDSS, Međimurje Party	117,208	6.23 (#4)	8 / 151	▲7	Opposition
2020 (July)	(as 'Enough of Robbery') SIP, NLSP, Let's Change Croatia, HSS SR, HSSČKŠ, ZSZ, Youth Action	37,628	2.26 (#7)	0 / 151	▼8	Extra-parliamentary; Opposition

=== European Parliament ===
Election	In coalition with	Votes won	Percentage	Seats won	Change
April 2013	ASH-DSŽ-SUH	6,391	0.86% (#14)	0 / 12	Steady
May 2014	None (as Savez za promjene)	4,313	0.47 (#10)	0 / 11	Steady
May 2019	None	60,847	5.7 (#5)	1 / 12	▲1
