= Social Democratic Action of Croatia =

Social Democratic Action of Croatia Akcija socijaldemokrata Hrvatske
- President: Zlatko Klarić
- Founded: 22 October 1994
- Dissolved: 2016
- Split from: Social Democratic Party
- Headquarters: Zagreb, Croatia
- Ideology: Social democracy Left-wing populism Anti-fascism
- Political position: Left-wing
- Colours: Blue; Red

Website
- www.ash.com.hr

Social Democratic Action of Croatia (Croatian: Akcija socijaldemokrata Hrvatske or ASH) was a Croatian left-wing political party.

It was founded by 1994 by members of Social Democratic Party of Croatia dissatisfied with the centrist policies of SDP leader Ivica Račan and his lack of criticism towards Franjo Tuđman.

The party had high hopes of gathering support beyond disenchanted SDP voters after Croatian Spring leader Miko Tripalo left Croatian People's Party in order to join them. In 1994, they tried to force an all-left party coalition in Croatia for the upcoming elections. The idea was rejected by Ivica Račan and SDP so they failed to realise it.

In the 1995 parliamentary election most of left-wing voters opted for SDP while ASH managed to get only one seat (Milorad Pupovac, 5th special district).

Alongside the party presidents, ASH had prominent members such as Vjeran Zuppa (prominent left-wing intellectual and dramaturge) and Tomislav Jakić (former journalist, TV reporter and advisor to president Stjepan Mesić).

In 2009, the party's membership was 6,300.

== Presidents ==
- Miko Tripalo (1994–1996)
- Silvije Degen (1996–2001)
- Zlatko Klarić (2001–2016)

== Electoral history ==
=== Legislative ===
Election	In coalition with	Votes won (coalition totals)	Percentage	Seats won	Change	Government
1995	None	40,348	1.67%	1 / 127	▲1	Opposition
2000	HSS-IDS-HNS-LS	432,527	14.70%	0 / 151	▼1	Extraparliamentary
2003	JSD	8,123	0.33%	0 / 151	Steady	Extraparliamentary
2007	HRS-ZS-JSD-DSŽ	7,354	0.30%	0 / 151	Steady	Extraparliamentary
2011	SUH-SSU-RI	12,065	0.51%	0 / 151	Steady	Extraparliamentary

=== European Parliament ===
Election	In coalition with	Votes won (coalition totals)	Percentage	Seats won	Change
2013	DSŽ-SP-SUH	6,391	0.86%	0 / 12	Steady
