= Green List (2005) =

Political party in Croatia

Green List Zelena lista
- Leader: Vlasta Toth and Milan Lončar
- Founded: 2005
- Dissolved: 2014
- Merged into: ORaH
- Headquarters: Zagreb
- Ideology: Green politics Social progressivism
- European affiliation: European Green Party (observer)
- International affiliation: Global Greens (observer)
- Colours: Green

Website
- http://www.zelena-lista.hr

The Green List (Croatian: Zelena lista or ZL) was a green political party in Croatia. It was founded in 2005 prior to local elections for Zagreb Assembly in which it first competed. Its initial name was Greens for Zagreb (Zeleni za Zagreb). At the local elections in May 2009, the party won 14 seats in Zagreb city districts (gradske četvrti, sg. gradska četvrt) councils and five in other local councils. In addition to their green politics, the party strongly supported gender equality, equal gender representation and participation and LGBT rights. In 2014 the Green List merged with ORaH.

== 2009–2010 Presidential election ==
On October 26, the Green list announced they would support Alka Vuica as their candidate for President of Croatia. However, they failed to collect the required 10,000 signatures. In the 2nd round, they supported the SDP candidate Ivo Josipović.

== 2007 general elections ==
These were the first general parliamentary elections for which the Green List put forward their candidates, contesting 7 out of 12 of the multi-member constituencies. They won between 0.3 and 0.7% of votes. In their program they warned of dangers of global warming and advocated measures such as removing the legal barriers they believed held back small scale solar power generation and ensuring that small scale producers would be paid for surpluses. It is the first political party in Croatia to have included an LGBT program for any election campaign.

== 2014 joining ORaH ==
The Green List joined the recently established Sustainable Development of Croatia ORaH party, led by parliamentary deputy Mirela Holy. By joining ORaH, the Green List, which had been active on the Croatian political scene for eight years, has ceased to exist.

== Electoral history ==
=== Legislative ===
Election	In coalition with	Votes won	Percentage	Seats won	Change
2007	None	5,972	0.24%	0 / 151	Steady
2011	None	8,575	0.36%	0 / 151	Steady

== See also ==
- Green party
- Green politics
- List of environmental organizations
