= Croatian Democratic Peasant Party =

Croatian Democratic Peasant Party Hrvatska demokratska seljačka stranka
- President: Ivan Martan
- Founded: 18 September 1994
- Split from: Croatian Peasant Party
- Headquarters: Čakovec, Croatia
- Ideology: Agrarianism; Conservatism
- Political position: Centre to centre-right
- Colors: Green
- Slogan: Faith in God and Peasant Unity (Vjera u Boga i seljačka sloga)

Website
- www.hdss.hr

The Croatian Democratic Peasant Party (Croatian: Hrvatska demokratska seljačka stranka or HDSS) is a minor agrarian-conservative political party in Croatia.

The party was led by Ivo Lončar, a popular television news reporter who was elected as a member of the 2000-2003 Parliament from the Croatian Peasant Party list; he subsequently left the party and became an independent deputy. In the November 2003 election he led the party list of HDSS and two other smaller parties and managed to retain his seat in the Parliament. The alliance won 1.0% of the popular vote and 1 out of 151 seats.

Since 2006, the party politics shifted from center-right to center. HDSS supports the development of the agrarian sector, free enterprise, as well as the values of tolerance and dialogue.

== Election results ==
=== Legislative ===
Election	Coalition	Votes	%	Seats	+/–	Government
Election	Coalition	Coalition totals		HDSS only		Government
2000	HSRS-NSP	8,434	0.29%	0 / 151	New	Extra-parliamentary
2003	HČSP-HKDU-HDC-DPS	24,872	1.0%	1 / 151	▲1	Opposition
2007	None	1,553	0.06%	0 / 151	▼1	Extra-parliamentary
2011	None	3,891	0.17%	0 / 151	0	Extra-parliamentary
2015	Did not participate			0 / 151	0	Extra-parliamentary
2016	ŽZ-PH-AM-ABECEDA-MS	117,208	6.23%	0 / 151	0	Extra-parliamentary
2020	Did not participate			0 / 151	0	Extra-parliamentary
2024	HSP–HB	18,128	0.85%	0 / 151	0	Extra-parliamentary
