= Democratic Centre (Croatia) =

Democratic Centre Demokratski centar
- Founder: Mate Granić; Vesna Škare-Ožbolt
- Founded: 2 April 2000
- Dissolved: 6 November 2015
- Split from: Croatian Democratic Union
- Merged into: Croatian Democratic Union
- Headquarters: 48 Ilica Street, Zagreb, Croatia
- Membership (2011): 17,300
- Ideology: Liberal conservatism
- Political position: Centre-right
- International affiliation: European People's Party (Observer)

The Democratic Centre (Croatian: Demokratski centar; DC) was a minor Croatian center-right political party active in the 2000s. Originally established as an offshoot of the Croatian Democratic Union (HDZ) in 2000, the party eventually merged back into HDZ in 2015.

== History ==
The party was formed in April 2000 by former Croatian Democratic Union (HDZ) senior government officials Mate Granić and Vesna Škare-Ožbolt. They both left the conservative HDZ after the party's decisive defeat in the January 2000 election, and Mate Granić's defeat in the February 2000 presidential race.

The 2000 defeat, which came in the aftermath of the death of the party's longtime leader Franjo Tuđman, ousted HDZ after nearly a decade of being in power. In the ensuing internal power struggles, a number of factions, ranging from hard-line nationalists to center-right moderates, left to form their own parties. Granić, former foreign minister, and Škare-Ožbolt, a jurist, were among the more prominent moderates. When the party was formed, DC described themselves as a "modern democratic popular party with a European orientation, and a party advocating for a strong civil society."

Meanwhile Ivo Sanader prevailed as HDZ's new leader and began moving the party towards the center-right. In the 2003 general election DC was allied with HDZ, and, following HDZ's return to power, gained a single seat in the Croatian Parliament, and a single ministerial post in the Cabinet of Ivo Sanader I, as Škare-Ožbolt, the party's leader and their only representative elected to parliament, was appointed Justice Minister.

She held the post from December 2003 to February 2006, when she was forced to step down by Prime Minister Ivo Sanader following allegations that she leaked information to the media, although some media pundits ascribed her resignation to her prominent public stance and ministerial results which overshadowed HDZ ministers. After that, DC spent the rest of their existence in opposition.

In October 2002, the Democratic Centre became an observer member of the European People's Party (EPP).

In the 2007 general elections DC ran independently, entering coalition agreements with the Green Party in some constituencies. They failed to win any seats in the 153-seat parliament. Škare-Ožbolt also ran for President in the 2009–10 election as a formally independent candidate but only managed to win 37,373 or 1.89% of votes in the first round, finishing 11th out of twelve candidates.

On 6 November 2015, Škare-Ožbolt and the leader of HDZ at the time, Tomislav Karamarko, signed a formal agreement formalizing the merger of DC back into HDZ. DC ceased to exist when it was struck from the register of political parties in April 2016.

=== Election history ===
==== Legislative ====
The following is a summary of the party's results in elections for the Croatian Parliament. The "Votes won" and "Percentage" columns include total sums of votes won by campaign coalitions that DC had been part of, and the "Seats won" column shows results achieved by DC.

Election	In coalition with	Votes won	Percentage	Seats won	Change
Election	In coalition with	(Coalition totals)		(DC only)	
November 2003	HSLS	100,335	4.0%	1 / 151	▲1
November 2007	Green Party (Constituencies II, VI, VIII)	20,080	0.8%	0 / 153	▼1
December 2011	HDZ and HGS	554,765	23.4%	1 / 151	▲1

==== European Parliament ====
Election	In coalition with	Votes won	Percentage	Seats won	Change
April 2013	None	5,413	0.73%	0 / 12	Steady
