= Autochthonous Croatian Peasant Party =

Autochthonous Croatian Peasant Party Autohtona hrvatska seljačka stranka
- Leader: Stanko Grčić
- Founded: 14 March 2007
- Headquarters: Zagreb
- Membership (2015): ca. 8,000
- Ideology: Green conservatism Agrarianism
- Political position: Centre-right
- National affiliation: Croatia is Growing (2015–2016)
- Colours: Green
- Sabor: 0 / 151
- European Parliament: 0 / 12

Website
- www.a-hss.com

The Autochthonous Croatian Peasant Party (Croatian: Autohtona hrvatska seljačka stranka) is a centre-right political party in Croatia.

== History ==
The Autochthonous Croatian Peasant Party was founded in Zagreb on 14 March 2007. First party president was Jasenko Stipac.

The party refers to the tradition of Stjepan Radić's HPSS.

According to the Party's statute, "it is in particular committed to the promotion of the interests of farmers, workers, and intelligence of the Croatian nation". Party's values are "honesty, faith, family, patriotism and labor."

Ahead of the 2015 parliamentary election the party joined the ruling centre to centre-left Kukuriku coalition led by the Social Democratic Party of Croatia.

== Electoral results ==
=== General elections ===
| Election | In coalition with | Votes won (coalition totals) | Percentage | Total seats won | Change |
|---|---|---|---|---|---|
| 2007 (November) | None | 7,850 | 0.32% | 0 / 151 | Steady |
| 2011 (December) | SP | 13,493 | 0.58% | 0 / 151 | Steady |
| 2015 (November) | Croatia is Growing | 742,909 | 33.2% | 0 / 151 | Steady |
| 2020 (July) | None | 958 | 0.06% | 0 / 151 | Steady |

=== European Parliament ===
| Election | In coalition with | Votes won | Percentage | Total seats won | Change |
|---|---|---|---|---|---|
| April 2013 | None | 6,785 | 0.92% | 0 / 12 | Steady |
| May 2014 | Alliance for Croatia | 63,437 | 6.88% | 0 / 11 | Steady |
