= Only Croatia – Movement for Croatia =

Only Croatia – Movement for Croatia Jedino Hrvatska – Pokret za Hrvatsku
- Leader: Milovan Šibl
- Founded: 9 May 2007
- Dissolved: 11 January 2019
- Headquarters: Zagreb
- Ideology: Croatian nationalism; Anti-communism; Euroscepticism
- Political position: Right-wing to far-right

Website
- http://www.jedinohrvatska.hr

Only Croatia – Movement for Croatia (Croatian: Jedino Hrvatska – Pokret za Hrvatsku) is a defunct political party in Croatia, formed in 2007.

The party was established by disaffected founding members of the HDZ, the Croatian Bloc (which extinguished itself the following year), and by a group of Croatian generals, including Marinko Krešić and Ljubo Ćesić Rojs.

The party opposed foreign ownership of strategic Croatian resources and real-estate, including the media and key industries. The party also opposed Croatian membership in NATO and especially the European Union.

In the 2007 Croatian parliamentary election, the party competed but won no seats in Sabor. Their best showing was in the 6th electoral district where they won 1.77% of the vote.

Only Croatia – Movement for Croatia was struck from the register of political parties on 11 January 2019.

== Electoral history ==
=== Legislative ===
Election	In coalition with	Votes won (coalition totals)	Percentage	Seats won	Change
2007	None	15,902	0.64%	0 / 151	Steady
2011	ABH-HDS	13,412	0.57%	0 / 151	Steady

=== European Parliament ===
Election	In coalition with	Votes won (coalition totals)	Percentage	Seats won	Change
2013	ABH	4,351	0.61%	0 / 12	Steady
