= Croatian Pure Party of Rights =

Croatian Pure Party of Rights Hrvatska čista stranka prava
- Founded: 1904 (historical); 12 December 1992 (modern)
- Dissolved: 29 September 2024
- Split from: Croatian Party of Rights
- Headquarters: Zagreb, Croatia
- Ideology: Croatian ultranationalism; National conservatism
- Political position: Far-right
- Colours: Black
- Sabor: 0 / 151
- European Parliament: 0 / 12

Website
- hcsp.hr

Croatian Pure Party of Rights (Croatian: Hrvatska čista stranka prava or HČSP) was a far-right political party in Croatia founded in 1992. The party claims to be an ideological descendant of the identically named right-wing Serbophobic historical party which was active in the early 20th century and which advocated the right to self-determination for Croatia at the time when it was part of Austria-Hungary and Kingdom of Yugoslavia.

In the 2011 Croatian parliamentary election, a coalition consisting of Croatian Party of Rights dr. Ante Starčević and Croatian Pure Party of Rights won one parliamentary seat, held by Ruža Tomašić from HSP-AS.

== History ==
The original HČSP was founded in 1904 by the Kvaternik and other factions of the Croatian Party of Rights (HSP), calling on the tradition of one of the Frankovci, a historical right-wing fraction movement of the Party of Rights from late 19th and early 20th century. Like most right-wing parties in Croatia, the HČSP claim a legacy descending from Ante Starčević.

The party was reconstituted in 1992.

The party ceased to exist on 29 September 2024, after various disagreements, poor results in the elections and internal disappointment of unimplemented plans.

Some members agreed to join another political party or found their own.

== Ideology ==
The modern party was founded by Ivan Gabelica and Nedeljko Gabelica.

The party supports the legacy of the Ustaša, Independent State of Croatia (NDH), and its leader Ante Pavelić. The official HČSP website features celebrations of Pavelić's 120th birthday, and the party members expressed loyalty to him by laying flowers on the grave of his parents, and attending church mass in honor of Pavelić. Luka Podrug, candidate of the HDZ-led coalition for the parliamentary elections 2015, expressed admiration for the Ustaše. He has also publicly admitted that he is "responsible" for Ustasha salute "Za dom spremni" on the monument to fallen members of the HOS in Split. At the Split cemetery on April 10, 2006, he celebrated the establishment of NDH saying that it is a "day that every normal Croat respects and celebrates, as a day comparable to their child's birthday"

Party policy would introduce lustration to the Croatian system, and would also cease cooperation with the International Criminal Tribunal for the former Yugoslavia. The party opposes the EU and NATO membership.

Internal policies would include banning abortion and not allowing same-sex marriages. Amnesty given to Serbs who participated in the rebellion, as well as the return of Serbs, would be cancelled.

== Regional Representation ==
HČSP contested local elections in Split and Split-Dalmatia County.

== Political activities ==
The party announced that it would spend 600,000 kuna for the 2007 electoral campaign. The youngest person competing in the 2007 elections, Kristina Posavec stated she has chosen to be on HČSP list because "it is against EU, NATO and gay marriages".

In one of the election debates, former party leader Josip Miljak stated that the "profit of INA goes to Hungary, to MOL, to the Jewish capital, while we are left only with the pollution." After this statement, HNS's Goran Beus Richembergh and SDP's Tonino Picula left the TV studio in protest.

In April 2012, HČSP attempted to organize an international far-right and neo-Nazi conference and meeting in Zagreb. The event did not take place, as it was banned by the Croatian Ministry of the Interior.

Members of the HČSP prominently attend protests against Zagreb Pride rallies and commemorations for victims of the Jasenovac concentration camp.

== Electoral history ==
=== Legislative ===
Election	In coalition with	Votes (coalition totals)	Percentage	Seats won	Change
2000	HP-NH	25,541	0.88%	0 / 151	Steady
2003	HKDU-HDSS	24,632	0.99%	0 / 151	Steady
2007	None	8,941	0.36%	0 / 151	Steady
2011	HSP AS	65,547	2.8%	0 / 151	Steady
2016	HSP-ABH-OS	13,082	0.7%	0 / 151	Steady

=== European Parliament ===
Election year	# of total votes	% of overall vote	# of seats won	Rank
2013	5,238 ▲	0.71% ▲	0 / 12	16 ▲
