= Green Party – Green Alternative =

- Leader: Josip-Anton Rupnik
- Founded: 2003
- Headquarters: Pula
- Ideology: Green politics
- Political position: Centre

Website
- http://www.zelenisavez.hr/

Green Party – Green Alternative (Croatian: Zelena stranka – Zelena alternativa) is centrist, regional, green and minor non-parliamentary party in Croatia. It was registered in Pula in 2003 as "Democratic Green Union – The Greens" (Croatian: Demokratski savez zelenih – Zeleni) . It is one of seven green parties in Croatia. It is led by Josip-Anton Rupnik, who got elected in 2005 local elections for Istrian County Council on the Croatian People's Party/Liberal Party (HNS/LS) coalition list.

This green party is against the legalization of drugs and pro-natalist.
