= Međimurje Party =

The Međimurje Party (Croatian: Međimurska stranka or MS) is a regional political party in Croatia, formed in Međimurje in 2000. It is usually aligned with right-wing parties.

At the last legislative elections, 23 November 2003, an alliance of the Croatian Party of Rights (Hrvatska stranka prava), the Međimurje Party and the Zagorje Democratic Party - won 6.4% of the popular vote and 8 out of 151 seats, all for the HSP.

== Electoral history ==
=== Legislative ===
Election	In coalition with	Votes won (coalition totals)	Percentage	Seats won	Change
2003	HSP-ZDS	157,987	6.4%	0 / 151	Steady
2015	BM 365-DPS-HES-HSZ-ES-Z-ID-DI-HRS-NSH-NV-SR-SU-UDU-ZS-Z-ZS	76,054	3.32%	0 / 151	Steady
2016	ŽZ-PH-AM-ABECEDA-HDSS	117,208	6,23%	0 / 151	Steady
