= Croatian Workers Party =

Croatian Labour Party
- Leader: Mladen Novosel
- Founded: 1999
- Headquarters: Samobor
- Ideology: Left-wing populism Workers' issues

Website
- http://www.hrs.com.hr/

The Croatian Workers Party (Croatian: Hrvatska radnička stranka) was a minor Croatian party without political representation. The Party had about 400 members. It was founded in 1999 in Samobor.

In the 2007 parliamentary elections it was a part of the United Left coalition led by Social Democratic Action of Croatia.

In the 2014 European Parliament election, the party received 0.35% of the vote.

== Electoral history ==
=== Legislative ===
Election	In coalition with	Votes won (coalition totals)	Percentage	Seats won	Change
2003	None	3,829	0.15%	0 / 151	Steady
2007	ASH-ZS-JSD	7,354	0.30%	0 / 151	Steady
2011	BUZ-PGS	66,239	2.8%	0 / 151	Steady
2015	BM 365-DPS-HES-HSZ-ES-Z-ID-DI-MS-NSH-NV-SR-SU-UDU-ZS-Z-ZS	74,301	3.32%	0 / 151	Steady
2016	None	798	0.04%	0 / 151	Steady

=== European Parliament ===
Election	In coalition with	Votes won (coalition totals)	Percentage	Seats won	Change
2013	None	3,946	0.53%	0 / 12	Steady
2014	None	3,214	0.35%	0 / 11	Steady
