= Women's Democratic Party =

- Leader: Marija Maja Jelinčić
- Founded: 2004
- Headquarters: Zagreb
- Ideology: Women's rights

Website
- https://dszena.wordpress.com/

Women's Democratic Party (Croatian: Demokratska stranka žena or DSŽ) was a women's rights political organization founded in Zagreb in 2004. Party aims to represent the interests and concerns of women. The party allows male members.

== Sources ==
- "Žene će bolje vladati i od HDZ-a i od SDP-a". Slobodna Dalmacija (in Croatian). 16 June 2004. Archived from the original on 3 March 2016.
