= Left-wing politics in Croatia =

History of left-wing movements in Croatia

The Croatian Left has consisted of a broad range of individuals, groups, and political parties who seek egalitarian, economic, social and cultural rights in Croatia. Left-wing ideologies came to Croatia in the late 19th century during the Austria-Hungary regime. In 1894, the Social Democratic Party of Croatia and Slavonia was formed. It was the first workers party in Croatia at the time. In the Kingdom of Serbs, Croats and Slovenes the leftist movement grew but it was suppressed by the royal government. In 1920, the Communist Party of Yugoslavia was proclaimed illegal and its sympathizers were brutally persecuted after winning a large number of positions in the local elections. During the 1920s, Stjepan Radić and his Croatian Peasant Party led a centre-left agrarianism and anti-royalist policy. They were the leading Croatian political party at the time. After the assassination of Radić in 1929, the Croatian Peasant Party was taken over by Vlatko Maček who enforced a more conservative and nationalist rhetoric. During the Socialist Yugoslavia era, the League of Communists of Yugoslavia was the only legal party in the country. In 1990, political plurality was restored and a number of left-wing parties emerged with the most notable one being the Social Democratic Party of Croatia.

== Origins ==
Marxist and socialist ideologies emerged in Croatia during the late 19th century while it was under the rule of the Austria-Hungary empire. In 1894, the Social Democratic Party of Croatia and Slavonia was formed. It was the first workers party of its kind in Croatia at the time. Its main ideology was Austromarxism so it mainly attracted local German settlers in Croatia. In 1910, Josip Broz Tito was a member of the party. Due to its Austromarxist ideology, the party was marginalised and banned after World War I started.

When the Kingdom of Serbs, Croats and Slovenes was created after World War I, the different social democratic parties that had existed in Austria-Hungary, Serbia and Montenegro called for a unification of their parties. In 1919, a congress was held in Belgrade where Bolshevik influence was introduced by soldiers who during the war had been captured by Russian forces and had experienced the October Revolution. It resulted in the creation of the Communist Party of Yugoslavia. In 1920, the Communists won a large number of seats in the local election which resulted in their banning by the royal government. It was then when the Communist members and sympathisers started working underground until 1941.

During the 1920s, Stjepan Radić and his Croatian Peasant Party were the leading political force amongst the Croatian population in the kingdom. Radić led an agrarianist, anti-royalist and anti-clerical policy. His politics at the time were considered to be left-leaning. In 1929, Radić was assassinated in Parliament, after which the King Alexander I of Yugoslavia abolished the constitution, dissolved parliament, and declared a royal dictatorship, changing the country into the first Yugoslavia and oppressing national sentiments. After the death of Radić, Vlatko Maček became president of the Croatian Peasant Party and he enforced a more conservative and nationalist policy which was mostly aimed at creating an Independent Croatian nation-state while social issues were put aside.

During World War II, while the Nazi puppet controlled Independent State of Croatia and Italy occupied modern Croatia territory, the only anti-fascist organised movement were the Yugoslav partisans who were created and led by the Communist Party of Yugoslavia and their commander Josip Broz Tito. In 1945, after the partisans won the war, Socialist Yugoslavia was established with a one-party system in which the Communist Party of Yugoslavia was the only legal political party. From 1945 to 1989, political plurality was suppressed in Yugoslavia and the League of Communists controlled the country with their bureaucratic-dogmatic approach.

It was during the era of Socialist Yugoslavia that the Socialist Republic of Croatia enacted a number of progressive and left-wing reforms such as the emancipation of women, egalitarianism, creation of a welfare state, universal health care, workers' self-management etc.

== Croatian left during the first elections and creation of modern Croatia ==
In the late 1980s, Socialist Yugoslavia was on the edge of breakup after Slobodan Milošević started his anti-bureaucratic revolution and used Serbian nationalism as a tool to achieve domination in the country. This movement sparked Croatian nationalism which would result in the rise of right-wing populism in Croatia.

In 1989, the League of Communists of Croatia declared that the first democratic elections would be held next year and that political plurality was restored. The first newly established left-wing party were the Social Democrats of Croatia. It was a social democratic-oriented party led by Antun Vujić, a Croatian Spring dissident. For the 1990 elections, he joined the coalition of liberal and moderate conservative parties called the Coalition of People's Accord. Vujčić won a seat in the parliament but the coalition won only 11 seats.

After the League of Communists of Croatia withdrew from the 14th SKJ party congress in January 1990 under the leadership of Ivica Račan, they decided to pursue a path of reformation. The party was renamed to League of Communists of Croatia-Party of Democratic Change. For the 1990 elections, Ivica Račan was not able to defeat the emerging right wing party of Franjo Tuđman, the Croatian Democratic Union. In the elections, Ivica Račan and his party won only 73 seats in the parliament while Franjo Tuđman won 205. Before the elections, Ivica Račan changed the electoral system for the benefit of his party but it backfired and the Croatian Democratic Union won a great majority of seats with only 41.76% of the popular vote. After the elections, numerous League of Communist members left the party and went to join the party of Franjo Tuđman. It is thought that about 70,000 former communists joined the Croatian Democratic Union.

On 3 November 1990, the League of Communists of Croatia held a convention where they changed their name to the Social Democratic Party of Croatia. They accepted a social-democratic platform with the rejection of socialism and Marxism. They also published the November Declaration where they condemned all the crimes that their party committed during the era of Federal Yugoslavia.

Croatia declared independence on 25 June 1991 and at the time the war in Croatia was starting to heat up against the self-proclaimed Serb parastate called Republic of Serbian Krajina. Since the Social Democratic Party got a lot of votes from Serbs in that self-proclaimed territory, it meant that Ivica Račan was about to face a great downfall in popular support.

== Croatian left during the 1990s ==
From 1991 to 1992, the Social Democratic Party and Social Democrats of Croatia were a part of the National Union government which was created by Franjo Tuđman during the first stages of the war.

The 2nd elections took place on 2 August 1992. The president and parliament were both elected on the same day. For the presidential elections, the Social Democratic Party supported Silvije Degen, president of the Socialist Party of Croatia, a minor left-wing party. Silvije Degen finished 5th with 4,1% of the popular vote while Franjo Tuđman won with a majority of 56.73% of the vote. Antun Vujić was also the candidate for president but finished last with only 0,7% of the vote. On the parliamentary elections, the Social Democratic Party won only 3 seats with 5.52% of the popular vote butgot 11 thanks to the Serb minority seats in parliament which were guaranteed by the constitution. The Social Democratic Union won 1.2% which was a great result for such a party. The Social Democratic Union was led by the famous economist Branko Horvat and the votes were a result of support from the ethnic Serbs living in the government-controlled territory. The Social Democrats of Croatia won only 0,6% of the vote.

After Franjo Tuđman won the presidential and parliamentary elections with a big majority, he easily imposed his will on the government controlled institutions and companies. That era is commonly known in Croatia as Tudjmanism. It commonly refers to the corrupt system of privatization, nepotism in appointing personnel to high state functions, anti-liberalism, international isolation, embracing of extreme Croatian nationalism, state-controlled media and abuse of human rights.

During that time, Ivica Račan and the Social Democratic Party tried to get rid of the perception that they were the successor party of the League of Communists. Račan tried to maintain good relations with Tuđman and at the same time act as an opposition to him. This, of course, did not resonate with the public and they stayed marginalised. The opposition at the time was ignored by the state-controlled mainstream media. In the Croatian Parliament, the most aggressive Tuđman critic was Vladimir Bebić, a famous left-wing politician from the Alliance of Primorje-Gorski Kotar.

In 1994, a former dissident and high ranking communist politician, Mika Tripalo founded Social Democratic Action of Croatia. His goal was to unite all the Croatian left parties. After a heated polemic with Ivica Račan, the Social Democratic Party declined the invitation because they wanted to become the only leading left party. The same year, Antun Vujić joined the Social Democratic Party and his party of the Social Democrats of Croatia merged with them.

The Social Democratic Party supported Stjepan Mesić and Josip Manolić in 1994 when they tried to split a number of parliamentary members from the Croatian Democratic Union in order to spark new elections. They were fierce opponents of the Croat–Bosniak War in Bosnia and Herzegovina which was organised by Franjo Tuđman and Gojko Šušak. The plan eventually failed with Mesić and Manolić becoming marginalised.

The third Croatian parliamentary elections were held in October 1995. Franjo Tuđman held the election a year early because he wanted to use the euphoria which was present in the country due to the success of Operation Storm. The Social Democratic Party won 8.93% of the popular vote and got 10 seats in parliament. The Social Democratic Union which was now allied with Vladimir Bebić won 3.24% of the vote but did not enter Parliament. Miko Tripalo's Social Democratic Action won only 1.57% of the vote. A year later, Miko Tripalo died and the party was taken over by Silvije Degen but it slowly faded into obscurity.

In 1997, former minister of culture in SR Croatia and Vice-President of the Presidency of SFR Yugoslavia, Stipe Šuvar founded the Socialist Labour Party of Croatia. It was the first democratic socialist party in modern Croatia. Šuvar was a strong critic of the Tuđman regime and he spoke about the war crimes that the Croatian Army committed after liberating Kninska Krajina in 1995. While dining in a restaurant with his wife in Zagreb, Šuvar was brutally attacked and suffered heavy injuries because of his political views.

For the 1997 presidential elections, the Social Democratic Party supported Zdravko Tomac as their candidate. Zdravko Tomac was a Croatian nationalist with social tendencies and Ivica Račan used him through the 1990s in order to get votes from centrist or right-wing voters. It proved useful in a short run but it failed on a long-term scale. Zdravko Tomac finished 2nd in the elections with 458,172 votes or 21.0%. Tuđmdan dominated the elections with 61.4% of the vote but Tomac defeated Vlado Gotovac, a candidate for the main opposition party, the Croatian Social Liberal Party who finished 3rd.

After the presidential elections, it was clear that the Social Democratic Party became the main opposition party and at that time, they started planning a coalition with the Croatian Social Liberal Party for the upcoming parliamentary elections. In 1998, the president of the Social-Liberal party Dražen Budiša and Ivica Račan signed an agreement in which they committed themselves to enter a coalition. After further negotiations, it was decided that the Social Democrats would be the main party with the influence of 2:1 on the candidacy lists. At the same time, they also planned a second coalition block which included 4 parties. It was a coalition of the Croatian Peasant Party, the Istrian Democratic Assembly, the Croatian People's Party – Liberal Democrats and the Liberal Party. Social Democratic Action of Croatia also joined that bloc but it had no influence.

The idea was that those two coalitions would run separately in the elections and later join forces. In 1999, the Croatian Democratic Union had low support. After a decade of destructive and clientelistic politics, they were faced with the prospect of losing the elections for the first time in modern history. There was a fear at the time that Franjo Tuđman would not allow the new liberal-left coalition to seize power if they won, a view which was shared by Ivica Račan. After Franjo Tuđman died in December 1999, the political stage was opened to change.

== First centre-left government (2000–2003) ==
On 3 January 2000, the liberal-left coalition of the Social Democratic Party and the Croatian Social Liberal Party won the parliamentary election. They got 38.7% of the popular vote while their second coalition of four parties won 14.7% of the vote. The two coalitions combined got 96 seats in the parliament while the Croatian Democratic Union won only 46 seats. Those elections were seen as historic and expectations were high for the new government. Ivica Račan became prime minister and later the constitution was changed so that the Republic of Croatia was transformed from a semi-presidential system to a parliamentary system. It meant that the President of Croatia lost most of his powers while the prime minister became most influential.

The first problems for the new government came after the presidential election in February 2000 when the governing candidate Dražen Budiša lost to Stjepan Mesić. The problem was not in the election of Stjepan Mesić but in the defeat of Budiša. Budiša, although a president of the Social-Liberal party, was a self-declared conservative and nationalist with a pragmatic approach in order to reach power. His main goal was to become president of Croatia, and after losing it, he became frustrated and started obstructing his own government.

The Račan government is regarded with mixed opinions. During his reign, a lot of pre-election promises were neglected such as the investigation of illegal privatisation processes during the 1990s, de-Tudjmanisation, bringing back the money taken from the country, high employment, etc. Račan himself said after becoming prime minister that he and the coalition weren't ready to take control of the country.

Croatia became open to the world during Račan, and it brought in fresh inflows of capital which helped jump-start Croatia's GDP growth, which amounted to around 5% per year but during that time the unemployment rate grew to a record high. In January 2002, the number of unemployed was a staggering 415,352 people or 24.0% of the population. Rača also began the construction of the A1 highway which was a major project but it advanced very slowly.

The new government also faced right-wing extremism when the ICTY indictments came for the Croatian generals but Račan tried to satisfy both sides in that process which failed miserably. In 2001, the famous Mirko Norac incident occurred when 100,000 people protested against the government in Split. He was prosecuted in Rijeka at the end. In 2001, the indictment came for Ante Gotovina and Račan tried to delay it. It resulted in the escape of Gotovina to exile which lasted until 2005 and it hurt Croatia's chances of entering the European Union. Till today it is unknown if Račan deliberately allowed Gotovina to escape. In 2002, when the indictment for Janko Bobetko came, Račan already had an unstable majority in the government and he feared the right-wing. He rejected the indictment and faced international isolation at that point. After Bobetkos death in 2003, the indictment was dropped and Croatia continued its negotiation process with the EU.

Račans government was notorious for its instability and heterogeneity. He led a five-party coalition which gave him little space to navigate. Račan was always careful of what he was saying and had to satisfy all of his political partners. His first crisis came in the summer of 2001 when Dražen Budiša spoke out against the indictment of Ante Gotovina. It was a populist move from Budiša who wanted only to justify his own persona as a conservative and patriot. Budiša resigned as president of the Social-Liberal party in July 2001 and gave Račan some breathing time.

The big coalition split came after Budiša was re-elected as president of the Social-Liberals in February 2002. The dispute with him and Račan continued and it resulted in Budiša leaving the coalition in July 2002. Jozo Radoš, general secretary of the Social-Liberal party decided to stay with Račan so he split with Budiša and gave Račan the majority for creating a new cabinet which was formed on 30 July 2002.

In the new cabinet, Račan's main partner was Zlatko Tomčić, president of the social conservative Croatian Peasant Party. Until the end of his term, Račans main goal was to keep the coalition functioning which resulted in a pragmatic government that was destined to lose elections.

In November 2003, the Social Democratic Party suffered a big loss at the parliamentary elections. the Social-Democrats won 43 seats in parliament or 560,593 votes while the Croatian Democratic Union returned to power with a staggering number of 840,692 votes or 66 seats in the parliament. Račan accepted his defeat on the night of the elections and returned to the opposition.

== Croatian left during the 2000s ==
After the new liberal-left government took power in 2000, the leftist parties and organisations were given more breathing space but they were still marginalised in the mainstream media which was still under mostly state control and left to be controlled by right-wing and conservative editors.

Except the ruling Social Democratic Party, the remaining opposition left parties were the Socialist Labour Party of Croatia of Stipe Šuvar and the Social Democratic Union which was notable only thanks to Vladimir Bebić. Both of them failed miserably in the 2000 and 2003 parliamentary elections.

Stipe Šuvar would give an interview from time to time but he was mostly ignored by the mass media. His book which spoke about politics in the early Croatian state, "The Croatian merry-go-round" in 2003 was a hit and shortly after the 2nd edition came. He was always admired as an honest politician even by people who disagree with his politics. He resigned as president of the Socialist Labour Party and died shortly after in June 2004. After his death, part of the members left the party and founded a separate party called Socialist Party of Croatia – Left Alternative. It remained marginalised.

Another minor left party was the Croatian Social Democrats who were formed in 2004. They didn't gain attention until 2010 when they were joined by Ivica Pančić. He was a member of parliament for the Social Democratic Party and former minister of war veterans in the Račan government. The Croatian Social Democrats remained a parliamentary party for a year thanks to Pančić but they vanished after the parliamentary elections in 2011.

In April 2007, Ivica Račan died and was replaced by a new and young president, Zoran Milanović. The Croatian prime minister and president of the Croatian Democratic Union at that time, Ivo Sanader, had a term which was filled with corruption scandals so the Social Democratic Party was expected to win the 2007 parliamentary elections with independent politician Ljubo Jurčić as the prime minister candidate. Ultimately, the Social Democratic Party won 56 seats in parliament while the Croatian Democratic Union won 66 seats. None of the two parties had a majority of 77 seats so they began the negotiations process with the Social Liberal Party and the Peasant party which were needed for the majority formation. A few days after the elections, Zora Milanović removed Ljubo Jurčić from the position of prime minister and put himself there so that he can negotiate the coalition formation process. In December 2007, the Liberals and Peasants decided to form a government with the Croatian Democratic Union and it formally meant that the Social Democrats lost the elections for the 2nd time in a row.

The 2008 financial crisis affected Croatia and the economy deteriorated. The support for Ivo Sanader started increasingly to fade away. On 1 July 2009, Ivo Sanader resigned as prime minister for personal reasons and was replaced by Jadranka Kosor. At that moment it was clear that the Croatian Democratic Union was going to lose the next elections.

The final blow for the right-wing government came in December 2010 when Ivo Sanader was acquitted for stealing money from state institutions while being prime minister and was arrested in Austria after trying to avoid the charges. All of this gave momentum for Zoran Milanović. The Social Democrats were sure of winning.

== Modern Croatian left (2010–2016) ==
In January 2010, the Social Democratic Party candidate for Croatian president Ivo Josipović won the 2009-10 presidential elections. It was the first time in modern Croatian history that the Social Democrats had their own president. Ivo Josipović defeated Milan Bandić in the second round of elections. Bandić was a former high-ranking member of the Social Democratic Party and mayor of Zagreb. He left the party in 2009 after declaring his run for president and after that, the Social Democrats lost control of Zagreb.

In March 2010, Dragutin Lesar, a famous trade union organizer and a member of parliament who left the social-liberal Croatian People's Party in 2008, founded his own party called Croatian Labourists – Labour Party. It was a left-wing party which was determined to fight for labor rights. Due to the high profile of its president, it gained considerable public attention and became well known.

On 23 November 2010, the Social Democratic Party, Croatian People's Party, Istrian Democratic Assembly and the Croatian Party of Pensioners signed a coalition called the Kukuriku coalition for the upcoming parliamentary elections.

The year 2011 saw a number of protests which were aimed against the conservative Kosor government. The so-called "Facebook protests" and the protests related to the indictment of Ante Gotovina and Mladen Markač in the ICTY sparked a massive uproar that was never seen in modern Croatia. This all made it easy for the liberal-left Kukuriku coalition to win the elections.

On 4 December 2011, the Kukuriku coalition led by the Social Democratic Party and Zoran Milanović as its chief, won the 2011 parliamentary elections with ease and crushed the Croatian Democratic Union. The Kukuriku coalition won a majority of 81 seats in parliament while the Croatian Democratic Union won only 47 seats. On 23 December, the Cabinet of Zoran Milanović formally took power in Croatia and his cabinet was also the youngest cabinet in the same period, with an average age of 48.

== Contemporary Green-Left developments in Croatia (2016–present) ==
Unlike the SDP and its coalitions that still depend on old party centered politics and resources, a new grass-root activism based left and green movement, including much of feminist, LGBTIQ+ and other activists, artists, academics, as well as younger union organizers were coming together in the past 5 years through direct actions and campaigns. These local platforms (often avoiding to register and function like party) advanced in claiming political space mostly in bigger urban areas that had strong protests around public space and corruption - primarily in Zagreb, but also in Dubrovnik and to less extent in Split and Pula. In 2017 Zagreb's coalition of Left Bloc, led by Zagreb is OURS! (Zagreb je NAŠ!) won seats in Zagreb Assembly and since then Tomislav Tomašević proved to be the most committed, vocal critic and as counter candidate for Milan Bandić for 2021 elections.

== See also ==
- Far-right politics in Croatia
- Liberalism in Croatia
