= List of members of the Sabor, 2003–2007 =

The fifth Sabor was constituted on 22 December 2003 with mandates divided to 152 representatives after the 23 November 2003 elections.

== Parliamentary officials ==
The president of the parliament (often also called the speaker in English) was Vladimir Šeks (HDZ).

Vice presidents of the parliament were:

- Luka Bebić (HDZ)
- Darko Milinović (HDZ)
- Đurđa Adlešić (HSLS)
- Mato Arlović (SDP)
- Vesna Pusić (HNS)

The secretary was Josip Sesar.

== Composition of the 5th Sabor ==
The following is the list parties represented in the 5th Sabor. Note that the Croatian law does not require candidates featured in party election lists to be members of the party, i.e. individuals can still run as independents on election lists submitted by political parties. Once elected, they are automatically considered members of that party's parliamentary caucus and normally vote together with the party even though they often continue to be formally independent.

Thus the table below includes data sorted by party caucuses. Apart from the three independents elected as representatives of various ethnic minorities (Jene Adam, Nikola Mak and Furio Radin), the December 2003 party figures also include seven other independents who were elected via party lists:

- Croatian Democratic Peasant Party - 1 MP (Ivo Lončar)
- Croatian Party of Rights - 1 MP (Slaven Letica)
- Social Democratic Party - 5 MPs (Mirko Filipović, Ivo Josipović, Ljubo Jurčić, Vice Vukov)

Party	December 2003	October 2007
Croatian Democratic Union (HDZ)	66	63
Social Democratic Party of Croatia (SDP)	34	
Croatian Peasant Party (HSS)	10	9
Croatian People's Party (HNS)	10	11
Croatian Party of Rights (HSP)	8	5
Istrian Democratic Assembly (IDS)	4	4
Croatian Party of Pensioners (HSU)	3	3
Independent Democratic Serb Party (SDSS)	3	3
Party of Liberal Democrats (LIBRA)	3	0
Croatian Social Liberal Party (HSLS)	2	3
Liberal Party (LS)	2	0
Alliance of Primorje-Gorski Kotar (PGS)	1	1
Croatian Democratic Peasant Party (HDSS)	1	0
Democratic Centre (DC)	1	1
Party of Democratic Action of Croatia (SDA)	1	1
Croatian Democratic Alliance of Slavonia and Baranja (HDSSB)	0	3
Slavonia-Baranja Croatian Party (SBHS)	0	1
Democratic Union of Međimurje (MDS)	0	1
Independents	3	
Total	152	152

== MPs by party ==
This is a list of MPs elected to Sabor in the 2003 parliamentary election, sorted by party. Note this table is a record of the 2003 election results, it is not a record of the current status of the Sabor. The Changes table below records all changes in party affiliation.

Party	Name	Constituency
Croatian Democratic Union (66)	Franjo Arapović	District 1
Croatian Democratic Union (66)	Zdenka Babić-Petričević	District 11 (diaspora)
Croatian Democratic Union (66)	Branko Bačić	District 10
Croatian Democratic Union (66)	Stjepan Bačić	District 2
Croatian Democratic Union (66)	Anto Bagarić	District 5
Croatian Democratic Union (66)	Ivan Bagarić	District 11 (diaspora)
Croatian Democratic Union (66)	Marija Bajt	District 5
Croatian Democratic Union (66)	Luka Bebić	District 10
Croatian Democratic Union (66)	Božo Biškupić	District 1
Croatian Democratic Union (66)	Jure Bitunjac	District 9
Croatian Democratic Union (66)	Florijan Boras	District 11 (diaspora)
Croatian Democratic Union (66)	Dražen Bošnjaković	District 6
Croatian Democratic Union (66)	Đuro Brodarac	District 6
Croatian Democratic Union (66)	Ivica Buconjić	District 4
Croatian Democratic Union (66)	Perica Bukić	District 9
Croatian Democratic Union (66)	Karmela Caparin	District 2
Croatian Democratic Union (66)	Lino Červar	District 8
Croatian Democratic Union (66)	Petar Čobanković	District 5
Croatian Democratic Union (66)	Krešimir Ćosić	District 11 (diaspora)
Croatian Democratic Union (66)	Tomislav Čuljak	District 5
Croatian Democratic Union (66)	Josip Đakić	District 4
Croatian Democratic Union (66)	Ivan Drmić	District 4
Croatian Democratic Union (66)	Stjepan Fiolić	District 6
Croatian Democratic Union (66)	Branimir Glavaš	District 4
Croatian Democratic Union (66)	Kolinda Grabar-Kitarović	District 7
Croatian Democratic Union (66)	Andrija Hebrang	District 2
Croatian Democratic Union (66)	Gordan Jandroković	District 2
Croatian Democratic Union (66)	Ivan Jarnjak	District 3
Croatian Democratic Union (66)	Neven Jurica	District 7
Croatian Democratic Union (66)	Božidar Kalmeta	District 9
Croatian Democratic Union (66)	Ivica Klem	District 5
Croatian Democratic Union (66)	Jadranka Kosor	District 1
Croatian Democratic Union (66)	Vladimir Kurečić	District 3
Croatian Democratic Union (66)	Ana Lovrin	District 9
Croatian Democratic Union (66)	Dujomir Marasović	District 10
Croatian Democratic Union (66)	Krunoslav Markovinović	District 7
Croatian Democratic Union (66)	Darko Milinović	District 9
Croatian Democratic Union (66)	Marijan Mlinarić	District 3
Croatian Democratic Union (66)	Petar Mlinarić	District 5
Croatian Democratic Union (66)	Željko Nenadić	District 6
Croatian Democratic Union (66)	Živko Nenadić	District 10
Croatian Democratic Union (66)	Branimir Pasecky	District 7
Croatian Democratic Union (66)	Velimir Pleša	District 3
Croatian Democratic Union (66)	Drago Prgomet	District 5
Croatian Democratic Union (66)	Šime Prtenjača	District 9
Croatian Democratic Union (66)	Zvonimir Puljić	District 10
Croatian Democratic Union (66)	Niko Rebić	District 9
Croatian Democratic Union (66)	Ivo Sanader	District 10
Croatian Democratic Union (66)	Vladimir Šeks	District 4
Croatian Democratic Union (66)	Petar Selem	District 1
Croatian Democratic Union (66)	Damir Sesvečan	District 2
Croatian Democratic Union (66)	Nevio Šetić	District 8
Croatian Democratic Union (66)	Vladimir Šišljagić	District 4
Croatian Democratic Union (66)	Zdravko Sočković	District 5
Croatian Democratic Union (66)	Mato Štimac	District 4
Croatian Democratic Union (66)	Ivana Sučec-Trakoštanec	District 2
Croatian Democratic Union (66)	Dubravka Šuica	District 10
Croatian Democratic Union (66)	Ivan Šuker	District 6
Croatian Democratic Union (66)	Emil Tomljanović	District 9
Croatian Democratic Union (66)	Jozo Topić	District 9
Croatian Democratic Union (66)	Marko Turić	District 1
Croatian Democratic Union (66)	Vladimir Vranković	District 8
Croatian Democratic Union (66)	Ivan Vučić	District 7
Croatian Democratic Union (66)	Branko Vukelić	District 7
Croatian Democratic Union (66)	Mario Zubović	District 6
Croatian Democratic Union (66)	Miomir Žužul	District 7
Social Democratic Party (34)	Zdenko Antešić	District 8
Social Democratic Party (34)	Ingrid Antičević-Marinović	District 9
Social Democratic Party (34)	Željka Antunović	District 4
Social Democratic Party (34)	Mato Arlović	District 5
Social Democratic Party (34)	Milan Bandić	District 2
Social Democratic Party (34)	Ljubica Brdarić	District 5
Social Democratic Party (34)	Mato Crkvenac	District 7
Social Democratic Party (34)	Mirko Filipović	District 1
Social Democratic Party (34)	Snježana Biga Friganović	District 6
Social Democratic Party (34)	Mato Gavran	District 5
Social Democratic Party (34)	Ivo Josipović	District 1
Social Democratic Party (34)	Ljubo Jurčić	District 6
Social Democratic Party (34)	Marin Jurjević	District 10
Social Democratic Party (34)	Miroslav Korenika	District 3
Social Democratic Party (34)	Josip Leko	District 6
Social Democratic Party (34)	Slavko Linić	District 10
Social Democratic Party (34)	Šime Lučin	District 9
Social Democratic Party (34)	Jagoda Martić	District 10
Social Democratic Party (34)	Neven Mimica	District 10
Social Democratic Party (34)	Zvonimir Mršić	District 2
Social Democratic Party (34)	Milanka Opačić	District 7
Social Democratic Party (34)	Ivica Pančić	District 2
Social Democratic Party (34)	Jelena Pavičić Vukičević	District 1
Social Democratic Party (34)	Biserka Perman	District 8
Social Democratic Party (34)	Anton Peruško	District 8
Social Democratic Party (34)	Tonino Picula	District 3
Social Democratic Party (34)	Ivica Račan	District 1
Social Democratic Party (34)	Vesna Škulić	District 7
Social Democratic Party (34)	Gordana Sobol	District 8
Social Democratic Party (34)	Nenad Stazić	District 7
Social Democratic Party (34)	Davorko Vidović	District 6
Social Democratic Party (34)	Antun Vujić	District 1
Social Democratic Party (34)	Vice Vukov	District 1
Social Democratic Party (34)	Dragica Zgrebec	District 3
Croatian Peasant Party (10)	Zdenka Čuhnil	District 12 (minorities')
Croatian Peasant Party (10)	Josip Friščić	District 2
Croatian Peasant Party (10)	Ljubica Lalić	District 5
Croatian Peasant Party (10)	Željko Ledinski	District 6
Croatian Peasant Party (10)	Ante Markov	District 9
Croatian Peasant Party (10)	Božidar Pankretić	District 7
Croatian Peasant Party (10)	Željko Pecek	District 4
Croatian Peasant Party (10)	Luka Roić	District 10
Croatian Peasant Party (10)	Zvonimir Sabati	District 3
Croatian Peasant Party (10)	Zlatko Tomčić	District 2
Croatian People's Party (10)	Radimir Čačić	District 3
Croatian People's Party (10)	Miljenko Dorić	District 8
Croatian People's Party (10)	Srećko Ferenčak	District 1
Croatian People's Party (10)	Dragutin Lesar	District 3
Croatian People's Party (10)	Antun Kapraljević	District 4
Croatian People's Party (10)	Alenka Košiša Čičin-Šain	District 6
Croatian People's Party (10)	Jakša Marasović	District 10
Croatian People's Party (10)	Ivica Maštruko	District 9
Croatian People's Party (10)	Vesna Pusić	District 1
Croatian People's Party (10)	Darko Šantić	District 7
Croatian Party of Rights (8)	Anto Đapić	District 4
Croatian Party of Rights (8)	Vlado Jukić	District 5
Croatian Party of Rights (8)	Pero Kovačević	District 2
Croatian Party of Rights (8)	Velimir Kvesić	District 6
Croatian Party of Rights (8)	Slaven Letica	District 1
Croatian Party of Rights (8)	Miroslav Rožić	District 7
Croatian Party of Rights (8)	Tonči Tadić	District 9
Croatian Party of Rights (8)	Ruža Tomašić	District 10
Istrian Democratic Assembly (4)	Valter Drandić	District 8
Istrian Democratic Assembly (4)	Ivan Jakovčić	District 8
Istrian Democratic Assembly (4)	Damir Kajin	District 8
Istrian Democratic Assembly (4)	Dorotea Pešić-Bukovac	District 8
Croatian Party of Pensioners (3)	Silvano Hrelja	District 8
Croatian Party of Pensioners (3)	Dragutin Pukleš	District 4
Croatian Party of Pensioners (3)	Josip Sudec	District 3
Independent Democratic Serb Party (3)	Ratko Gajica	District 12 (minorities')
Independent Democratic Serb Party (3)	Milorad Pupovac	District 12 (minorities')
Independent Democratic Serb Party (3)	Vojislav Stanimirović	District 12 (minorities')
Party of Liberal Democrats (3)	Vilim Herman	District 4
Party of Liberal Democrats (3)	Željko Pavlic	District 3
Party of Liberal Democrats (3)	Jozo Radoš	District 2
Croatian Social Liberal Party (2)	Đurđa Adlešič	District 2
Croatian Social Liberal Party (2)	Ivan Čehok	District 3
Liberal Party (2)	Ivo Banac	District 6
Liberal Party (2)	Zlatko Kramarić	District 4
Alliance of Primorje-Gorski Kotar (1)	Nikola Ivaniš	District 8
Croatian Democratic Peasant Party (1)	Ivo Lončar	District 3
Democratic Centre (1)	Vesna Škare-Ožbolt	District 5
Party of Democratic Action of Croatia (1)	Šemso Tanković	District 12 (minorities')
Independents (3)	Jene Adam	District 12 (minorities')
Independents (3)	Nikola Mak	District 12 (minorities')
Independents (3)	Furio Radin	District 12 (minorities')

== Changes ==
Note that a number of MPs who are high-ranking members of parties in the ruling coalition were subsequently appointed to various ministerial and governmental positions, while others continued to serve as city mayors. In such cases they are required by Croatian law to put their parliamentary mandate on hiatus for the duration of their other term of office and in the meantime their seats are then taken by a party-appointed replacement MP. Those replacements are not documented here unless they resulted in a change in party balance.

Date	Constituency	Loss	Gain	Note
17 September 2004	District 12	HSS	Independent	Zdenka Čuhnil (HSS), representative of the Czech and Slovak ethnic minorities, resigns from the Croatian Peasant Party, reducing them to 9 seats.
29 September 2004	District 3		Independent	Ivo Lončar, a formally independent MP who had been elected on Croatian Democratic Peasant Party (HDSS) list severs ties to HDSS and becomes fully independent, leaving the party with no representation in parliament.
9 February 2005	District 6		Independent	Ivo Banac (LS) resigns from the Liberal Party.
9 February 2005	Districts 3, 4		HNS-LD	Jozo Radoš (LIBRA) and Vilim Herman (LIBRA) join the Croatian People's Party (HNS) following the party's merger with HNS.
9 February 2005	District 3		Independent	Željko Pavlic (LIBRA) resigns from the party following its merger into HNS.
23 February 2005	District 1	HSP	Independent	Slaven Letica, a formally independent MP who had been elected on Croatian Party of Rights (HSP) list severs ties to HSP and becomes fully independent, reducing them to 7 seats.
30 March 2005	District 3	Independent		Željko Pavlic (Ind.) joins the non-parliamentary regionalist party Democratic Union of Međimurje (MDS) and becomes their only member of parliament.
21 April 2005	District 4	HDZ	Independent	Three HDZ members (Ivan Drmić, Branimir Glavaš and Vladimir Šišljagić) resign from the Croatian Democratic Union, reducing it to 63 seats.
4 November 2005	District 4	HNS-LD		Vilim Herman (HNS) joins the non-parliamentary regionalist Slavonia-Baranja Croatian Party (SBHS) and becomes their only member of parliament.
11 February 2006	District 4		HSLS	Zlatko Kramarić (LS) joins the Croatian Social Liberal Party (HSLS) during the former's merger into the latter. This increases the number of HSLS to three seats.
25 September 2006	District 4	Independent	HDSSB	Three independents who had earlier resigned from HDZ in April 2005 (Ivan Drmić, Branimir Glavaš and Vladimir Šišljagić) become members of the newly established Croatian Democratic Alliance of Slavonia and Baranja (HDSSB).
24 September 2007	Districts 7,9	HSP	Independent	Two HSP members (Miroslav Rožić and Tonči Tadić) resign from the Croatian Party of Rights, reducing them to 5 seats.
