= Cabinet of Ivica Račan II =

Croatian government (2002–2003)

Second Račan Cabinet
- 8th Cabinet of the Republic of Croatia

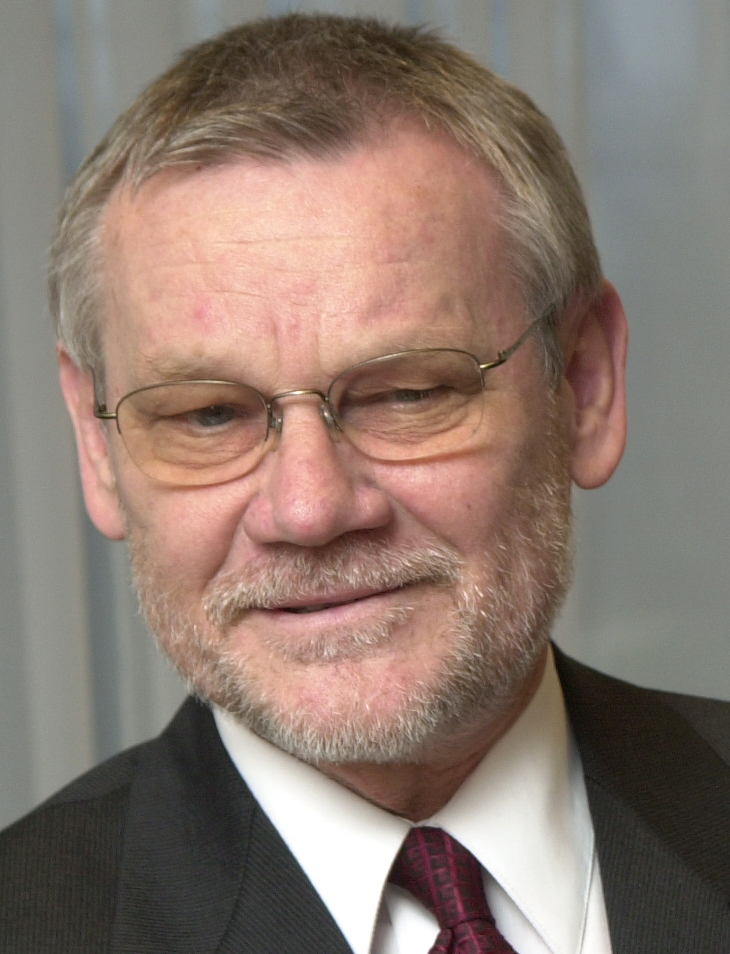
- Date formed: 30 July 2002
- Date dissolved: 23 December 2003

People and organisations
- Head of state: Stjepan Mesić
- Head of government: Ivica Račan
- Deputy head of government: Goran Granić; Ante Simonić; Slavko Linić; Željka Antunović
- No. of ministers: 24 (on 23 December 2003)
- Ministers removed: 1
- Total no. of members: 25 (including former members)
- Member parties: Social Democratic Party; Party of Liberal Democrats; Croatian Peasant Party; Croatian People's Party; Liberal Party
- Status in legislature: Majority coalition government
- Opposition party: Croatian Democratic Union
- Opposition leader: Ivo Sanader

History
- Election: 3 January 2000
- Legislature terms: 2000–2003
- Predecessor: Cabinet of Ivica Račan I
- Successor: Cabinet of Ivo Sanader I

The Eight Government of the Republic of Croatia (Croatian: Osma Vlada Republike Hrvatske) was the second of two Croatian Government cabinets led by Prime Minister Ivica Račan. It was announced on 30 July 2002 and its term ended on 23 December 2003. Račan's second cabinet was formed after Croatian Social Liberal Party (HSLS) and Istrian Democratic Assembly (IDS) had decided to leave the ruling six-party coalition. The cabinet was succeeded by Cabinet of Ivo Sanader I, following the centre-right Croatian Democratic Union's return to power in the 2003 parliamentary elections.

Parties included in the government:

- Social Democratic Party of Croatia (SDP)
- Croatian People's Party (HNS)
- Croatian Peasant Party (HSS)
- Party of Liberal Democrats (Libra)
- Liberal Party (LS)

== Motions of confidence ==
Vote on the confirmation of the 8th Government of the Republic of Croatia
Ballot	30 July 2002	
Absentees	19 / 151	
Required majority	76 Yes votes out of 151 votes (Absolute majority of the total number of Members of Parliament)	
Yes	84 / 151	check
No	47 / 151	
Abstentions	1 / 151	

== Party breakdown ==
Party breakdown of cabinet ministers (23 December 2003):

- Social Democratic Party
15
- Croatian Peasant Party
4
- Libra
2
- Croatian People's Party
2
- Liberal Party
1

== Changes from Cabinet of Ivica Račan I ==
Following the exit of IDS (in June 2001) and HSLS (in July 2002) from the ruling coalition, the cabinet was reconstructed. IDS only had one seat in the cabinet which had already been taken over by SDP. As for seven HSLS members of government (six ministers and one deputy prime minister), they were replaced either by members of SDP or by politicians from HSLS' splinter party Libra (Party of Liberal Democrats) which was formed by former HSLS members who decided to support the government rather than follow HSLS president Dražen Budiša's decision to leave the coalition and move into opposition. A third liberal party LS (Liberalna stranka), which had been established in 1997 by Vlado Gotovac as an earlier offshoot of HSLS, also chose to support the ruling coalition and gained one seat in the cabinet.

- Goran Granić (ex HSLS, now Libra) returned to the post of Deputy Prime Minister after four months (Granić was Deputy Prime Minister from January 2000 to March 2002, when he was replaced by his party leader Dražen Budiša who held the post from March to July that year).
- The number of Deputy Prime Ministers was expanded from three to four, with Ante Simonić (HSS) appointed as the fourth deputy. Along with three seats HSS already had in the previous cabinet, this increased their presence to four cabinet members.
- Željka Antunović (SDP) continued to serve as Deputy PM, but also took on the post of defence minister, replacing Jozo Radoš (ex HSLS). Although Radoš had also left HSLS and joined the newly formed Libra, he resigned from his post to pave the way for Antunović.
- Roland Žuvanić (ex HSLS, now Libra) replaced Mario Kovač (HSLS) as Minister of Maritime Affairs, Transport and Communications.
- Božo Kovačević (ex HSLS, now LS) kept his post as Minister of Environmental Protection and Physical Planning, but was replaced in July 2003 by Ivo Banac (LS).
- Hrvoje Kraljević (HSLS), Minister of Science and Technology, was replaced by Gvozden Flego (SDP).
- Hrvoje Vojković (HSLS), Minister of Economy, was replaced by Ljubo Jurčić (SDP)
- Gordana Sobol (SDP) was appointed Minister without portfolio

== List of ministers and portfolios ==
Some periods in the table start before the cabinet's inauguration, when the minister listed was appointed to the post in the preceding Cabinet of Ivica Račan I (27 January 2000 – 30 July 2002).

Minister	Party	Portfolio	Period
Ivica Račan	SDP	Prime Minister	27 January 2000 – 23 December 2003
Goran Granić	Libra	Deputy Prime Minister	30 July 2002 – 23 December 2003
Ante Simonić	HSS	Deputy Prime Minister	30 July 2002 – 23 December 2003
Slavko Linić	SDP	Deputy Prime Minister	27 January 2000 – 23 December 2003
Željka Antunović	SDP	Deputy Prime Minister	27 January 2000 – 23 December 2003
Željka Antunović	SDP	Minister of Defence	30 July 2002 – 23 December 2003
Andro Vlahušić	HNS	Minister of Health	22 November 2001 – 23 December 2003
Davorko Vidović	SDP	Minister of Labour and Social Welfare	27 January 2000 – 23 December 2003
Mato Crkvenac	SDP	Minister of Finance	27 January 2000 – 23 December 2003
Antun Vujić	SDP	Minister of Culture	27 January 2000 – 23 December 2003
Božidar Pankretić	HSS	Minister of Agriculture and Forest Management	27 January 2000 – 23 December 2003
Ivica Pančić	SDP	Minister of Veterans' Affairs	27 January 2000 – 23 December 2003
Tonino Picula	SDP	Minister of Foreign Affairs	27 January 2000 – 23 December 2003
Neven Mimica	SDP	Minister of European Integration	28 September 2001 – 23 December 2003
Roland Žuvanić	Libra	Ministry for Maritime Affairs, Transport and Communications	30 July 2002 – 23 December 2003
Pave Župan-Rusković	SDP	Minister of Tourism	27 January 2000 – 23 December 2003
Ingrid Antičević-Marinović	SDP	Minister of Justice, Public Administration and Local Self-government	28 September 2001 – 23 December 2003
Božo Kovačević	LS	Minister of Environmental Protection and Physical Planning	27 January 2000 – 18 July 2003
Ivo Banac	LS	Minister of Environmental Protection and Physical Planning	18 July 2003 – 23 December 2003
Radimir Čačić	HNS	Minister of Public Works, Construction and Reconstruction	27 January 2000 – 23 December 2003
Gvozden Flego	SDP	Minister of Science and Technology	30 July 2002 – 23 December 2003
Vladimir Strugar	HSS	Minister of Education and Sports	27 January 2000 – 23 December 2003
Šime Lučin	SDP	Minister of the Interior	27 January 2000 – 23 December 2003
Ljubo Jurčić	SDP	Minister of Economy	30 July 2002 – 23 December 2003
Željko Pecek	HSS	Minister for Crafts, Small and Mid-sized Entrepreneurship	27 January 2000 – 23 December 2003
Gordana Sobol	SDP	Minister without portfolio	30 July 2002 – 23 December 2003
