= Cabinet of Ivica Račan I =

Croatian government (2000–2002)

First Račan Cabinet
- 7th Cabinet of the Republic of Croatia

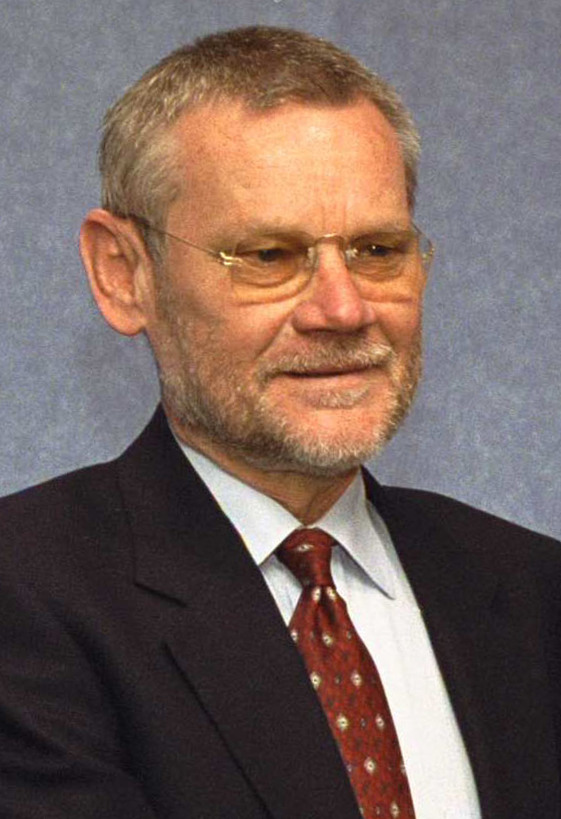
- Date formed: 27 January 2000 (Presidential decree); 2 February 2000 (Vote of confidence)
- Date dissolved: 30 July 2002

People and organisations
- Head of state: Vlatko Pavletić (Acting) (2000); Zlatko Tomčić (Acting) (2000); Stjepan Mesić (2000–2002)
- Head of government: Ivica Račan
- Deputy head of government: Željka Antunović; Slavko Linić; Goran Granić (2000–2002); Dražen Budiša (2002)
- No. of ministers: 22 (on 30 July 2002)
- Ministers removed: 7
- Total no. of members: 29 (including former members)
- Member parties: Social Democratic Party; Croatian Social Liberal Party; Croatian Peasant Party; Croatian People's Party; Istrian Democratic Assembly
- Status in legislature: Majority coalition government
- Opposition party: Croatian Democratic Union
- Opposition leader: Ivo Sanader

History
- Election: 3 January 2000
- Legislature terms: 2000–2003
- Predecessor: Cabinet of Zlatko Mateša
- Successor: Cabinet of Ivica Račan II

The Seventh Government of the Republic of Croatia (Croatian: Sedma Vlada Republike Hrvatske) was the first of two Croatian Government cabinets led by Prime Minister Ivica Račan. It was appointed on 27 January 2000 by a decree of the Acting President of the Republic and Speaker of Parliament, Vlatko Pavletić. The cabinet was confirmed by a parliamentary vote of confidence in the Chamber of Representatives on 2 February 2000, with 122 of 151 Members of Parliament voting for, 1 against and 1 abstaining. Its term ended on 30 July 2002, when it was reconstructed and replaced by Cabinet of Ivica Račan II. The cabinet was formed following the 2000 parliamentary elections, in which the centre-right party Croatian Democratic Union (HDZ) was defeated by a broad coalition of several centre-left parties. This marked an end to HDZ's dominance in Croatian politics since the first multi-party election in 1990. However, the period under Prime Minister Račan was marred with constant disagreements among coalition members, which later led to some parties leaving the ruling coalition. This ultimately paved the way for HDZ's return to power in the 2003 parliamentary elections.

Parties included in the original coalition and their quotas:

- Social Democratic Party (SDP) – 11 seats in cabinet (PM, 2 Deputy PM's and 8 ministers)
- Croatian Social Liberal Party (HSLS) – 5 seats in the cabinet (1 Deputy PM and 4 ministers)
- Croatian People's Party (HNS) – 1 seat in the cabinet (1 minister)
- Croatian Peasant Party (HSS) – 3 seats in the cabinet (3 ministers)
- Istrian Democratic Assembly (IDS) – 1 seat in the cabinet (1 minister)
- Liberal Party (LS) – 1 seat in the cabinet (1 minister)

This was the last cabinet to hold office under a relatively powerful semi-presidential system (at times more resembling a superpresidential system), as constitutional changes implemented by the new center-left government shifted considerable political power and authority away from the President of the Republic towards the prime minister and his government cabinet as a whole. However, the new parliamentary system retains the direct election of the President by universal suffrage (rather than a president who would be elected by parliament) and can therefore be considered to be an incomplete one.

== Motions of confidence ==
Vote on the confirmation of the 7th Government of the Republic of Croatia
Ballot	9 February 2000	
Absentees	27 / 151	
Required majority	76 Yes votes out of 151 votes (Absolute majority of the total number of Members of Parliament)	
Yes	122 / 151	check
No	1 / 151	
Abstentions	1 / 151	

== Party breakdown ==
Party breakdown of cabinet ministers:

- Social Democratic Party
10
- Croatian Social Liberal Party
5
- Croatian Peasant Party
3
- Croatian People's Party
1
- Liberal Party
1

== Ministers ==
Minister	Party	Portfolio	Term start	Term end
Ivica Račan (PM)	SDP	Prime Minister	27 January 2000	23 December 2003
Željka Antunović (D)	SDP	Deputy Prime Minister	27 January 2000	23 December 2003
Slavko Linić (D)	SDP	Deputy Prime Minister	27 January 2000	23 December 2003
Davorko Vidović	SDP	Labour and Social Welfare	27 January 2000	23 December 2003
Mato Crkvenac	SDP	Finance	27 January 2000	23 December 2003
Antun Vujić	SDP	Culture	27 January 2000	23 December 2003
Ivica Pančić	SDP	Veterans' Affairs	27 January 2000	23 December 2003
Tonino Picula	SDP	Foreign Affairs	27 January 2000	23 December 2003
Pave Župan-Rusković	SDP	Tourism	27 January 2000	23 December 2003
Stjepan Ivanišević	SDP	Justice, Public Administration and Local Self-government	27 January 2000	27 September 2001
Šime Lučin	SDP	Interior	27 January 2000	23 December 2003
Goran Granić (D)	HSLS	Deputy Prime Minister	27 January 2000	21 March 2002
Alojz Tušek	HSLS	Maritime Affairs, Transport and Communications	27 January 2000	21 March 2002
Jozo Radoš	HSLS	Defence	27 January 2000	5 July 2002
Božo Kovačević	LS	Environmental Protection and Physical Planning	27 January 2000	18 July 2003
Hrvoje Kraljević	HSLS	Science and Technology	27 January 2000	30 July 2002
Goranko Fižulić	HSLS	Economy	27 January 2000	21 March 2002
Božidar Pankretić	HSS	Agriculture and Forest Management	27 January 2000	23 December 2003
Vladimir Strugar	HSS	Education and Sports	27 January 2000	23 December 2003
Željko Pecek	HSS	Crafts, Small and Mid-sized Entrepreneurship	27 January 2000	23 December 2003
Radimir Čačić	HNS	Public Works, Construction and Reconstruction	27 January 2000	23 December 2003
Ivan Jakovčić	IDS	European Integration	27 January 2000	21 June 2001
Ana Stavljenić Rukavina	Non-party	Health	27 January 2000	23 October 2001

== Changes ==
Date	Gain	Loss	Note
21 June 2001		IDS	President of the Istrian regionalist IDS party Ivan Jakovčić resigns as minister for European integration, after his party decides to leave the ruling coalition. This was the only post in the cabinet held by IDS. The decision was triggered by unresolved differences over the new Istria County statute proposed by IDS which introduced Italian language as co-official at the county level, only to be suspended by justice ministry. After 13 contentious articles of the statute were amended, it was eventually adopted in November 2001. Prior to his resignation, Jakovčić ran in the May 2001 local elections and was appointed Prefect of Istria County in July, a post he held until June 2013.
27 September 2001		SDP	Justice minister Stjepan Ivanišević resigns, citing health reasons. According to media reports, he had handed over his resignation in June, but the decision was postponed by prime minister Račan until September. In a 2011 interview Ivanišević said there were also other factors which contributed to his decision, including the disagreements on whether to abolish the Chamber of Counties in what was then a bicameral parliament, and the handling of arrest warrants issued by the International Criminal Tribunal for the former Yugoslavia for Croatian Army generals Rahim Ademi and Ante Gotovina issued in June 2001.
28 September 2001	SDP		Senior SDP member Neven Mimica takes office as minister for European integration, succeeding Jakovčić. In addition, SDP's Ingrid Antičević-Marinović is appointed justice minister, replacing fellow SDP member Ivanišević.
23 October 2001		Non-party	Ana Stavljenić Rukavina, non-party health minister appointed within HSLS quota, resigns over a scandal after 23 kidney patients had died in several hospitals around the country after they had received dialysis treatment. Investigation showed that the deaths were caused by faulty dialysis filters produced by Baxter International and imported by Croatian pharmaceutical company Pliva. Her deputy minister, SDP member Rajko Ostojić, also offered to resign, but the offer was rejected by the cabinet.
22 November 2001	HSLS		Senior HSLS member and head of Dubrovnik Hospital, Andro Vlahušić, takes office as health minister, succeeding Stavljenić-Rukavina. This increases the number of HSLS seats in the cabinet to seven.
21 March 2002	HSLS	HSLS	Following his surprise defeat in the January 2000 presidential election, HSLS leader Dražen Budiša returned to his seat in the Croatian parliament, but then resigned from party presidency in July 2001, opposing coalition government's handling of arrest warrants issued by the Hague war crimes tribunal for two Croatian Army generals, and after his stance on the matter was not met with support by fellow party members. Budiša then continued to vocally criticise HSLS members of the cabinet, asking for Deputy Prime Minister Goran Granić to resign. In February 2002 he nevertheless ran in internal party election and assumed party presidency again. This provoked a political crisis over whether the party would stay in the coalition, but in March he replaced Goran Granić as Deputy Prime Minister, a seat reserved for HSLS' coalition quota. In addition, the party decides to change two other ministers in the government, with Mario Kovač replacing Alojz Tušek as minister for maritime affairs, transport and communications, and Hrvoje Vojković replacing Goranko Fižulić as minister of economy.
