= Božo Kovačević (politician) =

Croatian politician and diplomat

Božo Kovačević (born 11 January 1955) is a Croatian politician and diplomat.

Kovačević was born in Pakrac and he graduated in sociology and philosophy at the Faculty of Philosophy, Zagreb.

Kovačević was one of the founders of the Croatian Social Liberal Party in 1989, and the Liberal Party in 1998.

Kovačević was the Ambassador Extraordinary and Plenipotentiary of the Republic of Croatia to the Russian Federation from January 2004 to February 2009. He was the Minister of Environmental Protection and Physical Planning in the 7th and 8th Government of the Republic of Croatia, from January 2000 to July 2003.

== See also ==
- Embassy of Croatia in Moscow

Political offices
Preceded by Marko Širac as Minister of Physical Planning, Construction and Housing	Minister of Environmental Protection and Physical Planning; 2000–2003	Succeeded by Ivo Banac
Diplomatic posts
Preceded by ?	Ambassador of Croatia to Russia; 2004–2009	Succeeded by Nebojša Koharović
