= Party of Liberal Democrats =

Party of Liberal Democrats LIBRA - Stranka liberalnih demokrata
- Founder: Jozo Radoš
- Founded: 21 September 2002
- Dissolved: 23 August 2005
- Split from: Croatian Social Liberal Party (HSLS)
- Merged into: Croatian People's Party (HNS)
- Ideology: Social liberalism
- European affiliation: European Liberal Democrat and Reform Party (affiliate)
- Colours: Blue; Yellow

LIBRA - Party of Liberal Democrats (Croatian: LIBRA - Stranka liberalnih demokrata or LIBRA for short, also spelled Libra) was a short-lived Croatian social-liberal political party active between September 2002 and August 2005. During its existence the party ran in only one parliamentary election, in 2003, and won three seats in the 151-seat 5th Assembly of the Croatian Parliament.

LIBRA was formed in July 2002 and formally registered in September that year, following a split in the Croatian Social Liberal Party (HSLS) when a faction led by Jozo Radoš, then defence minister in the Cabinet of Ivica Račan I, opposed HSLS leader Dražen Budiša's decision to leave the ruling five-party centre-left coalition dominated by SDP, in the hopes of provoking an early election. However, then Prime Minister Ivica Račan managed to avoid a fresh election by forming a reconstructed Cabinet of Ivica Račan II on 30 July 2002, with the newly formed LIBRA holding two seats in the cabinet - Goran Granić as Deputy Prime Minister, and Roland Žuvanić as Minister for Maritime Affairs, Transport and Communications.

Until the end of the 4th Assembly in October 2003, the party was represented in the Croatian Parliament with nine members, all former HSLS members, with Ivo Škrabalo as head of the party club.

LIBRA then ran in the November 2003 election as a junior partner in a centre-left coalition with Social Democratic Party (SDP), Istrian Democratic Assembly (IDS) and the Liberal Party (LS). The coalition lost the election to the centre-right Croatian Democratic Union (HDZ), winning a total of 43 seats in a 151-seat parliament, out of which only 3 belonged to LIBRA.

In February 2005 party members voted to merge with the Croatian People's Party (HNS) which changed its name in Croatian People's Party - Liberal Democrats (HNS-LD or, more commonly, just HNS). Two of LIBRA's MPs in the 5th Assembly, Jozo Radoš and Vilim Herman, joined HNS, while the third, Željko Pavlic, resigned his party membership to become independent.

In August 2005 the party was formally struck from the party register.

== Election history ==
The following is a summary of the party's results in legislative elections for the Croatian Parliament.

Election	In coalition with	Votes won (coalition totals)	Percentage	Seats won	Change	Government
2003	SDP-IDS-LS	560,593	22.60%	3 / 151	▲3	Opposition

== See also ==
- Liberalism in Croatia
- Croatian People's Party – Liberal Democrats
