= Ivan Čehok =

Croatian politician (born 1965)

Mayor of Varaždin
- In office 2017–2021
- In office 2001–2011

President of the Croatian Social Liberal Party
- In office 2004–2006

Personal details
- Born: 13 September 1965 (age 60) Korenjak near Maruševec, SR Croatia, SFR Yugoslavia
- Party: Croatian Social Liberal Party (1989–2010)
- Education: University of Zagreb

Ivan Čehok (born 13 September 1965) is a Croatian politician who served as mayor of Varaždin from 2001 to 2011, and from 2017 to 2021. He was a prominent member of the Croatian Social Liberal Party (HSLS).

Čehok was born in Korenjak (part of Maruševec), in Varaždin County. He obtained a degree in philosophy and comparative literature from the Zagreb Faculty of Philosophy, and later also earned a PhD in philosophy from the same faculty. He wrote several philosophy and ethics high school textbooks.

Between 2004 and 2006, Čehok was president of the HSLS.

He was elected to the Croatian Parliament in 2000, 2003, and 2007 parliamentary elections. He left the Croatian Social Liberal Party in 2010.

In June 2011, Čehok was arrested and questioned by USKOK on criminal charges, after his parliamentary immunity was stripped by the Parliament.

In July 2011, while in custody, Čehok resigned as the mayor of Varaždin. In the same year, he went into retirement.

In the 2017 local election, Čehok was re-elected as the mayor of Varaždin.

In the 2021 local election, Čehok lost and took over the leadership of his independent list in The City Council of Varaždin.

Party political offices
Preceded by Dražen Budiša	President of Croatian Social Liberal Party (acting); 17 December 2003 – 17 January 2004	Succeeded by Ivan Čehok
Preceded by Ivan Čehok (acting)	President of Croatian Social Liberal Party; 17 January 2004 – 11 February 2006	Succeeded by Đurđa Adlešič
