= Jozo Radoš =

Croatian politician and MEP

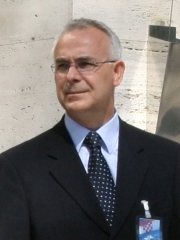

Member of the European Parliament
- In office 1 July 2014 – 1 July 2019

Member of the Croatian Parliament
- In office 22 December 2011 – 1 July 2014
- Prime Minister: Zoran Milanović
- Constituency: II electoral district
- In office 22 December 2003 – 11 January 2008
- Prime Minister: Ivo Sanader
- Constituency: II electoral district
- In office 12 August 1992 – 27 January 2000
- Prime Minister: Hrvoje Šarinić (until 1993) Nikica Valentić (1993–1995) Zlatko Mateša

Minister of Defence
- In office 28 January 2000 – 5 July 2002
- Prime Minister: Ivica Račan
- Preceded by: Pavao Miljavac
- Succeeded by: Željka Antunović

President of the Party of Liberal Democrats (LIBRA)
- In office 21 September 2002 – 6 February 2006
- Preceded by: Post created
- Succeeded by: Vesna Pusić (as president of the merged Croatian People's Party – Liberal Democrats)

Personal details
- Born: 3 November 1956 (age 69) Seonica, PR Bosnia and Herzegovina, FPR Yugoslavia (modern Bosnia and Herzegovina)
- Party: HSLS (1990–2002); LIBRA (2002–2005); HNS-LD (2005–2017); GLAS (2017–)
- Children: 3
- Education: University of Zagreb

Jozo Radoš (pronounced [jozo radoʃ]; born 3 November 1956) is a Croatian liberal politician currently serving as one out of 11 Croatian members of the European Parliament. He previously served as a Minister of Defence, member of the Croatian Parliament and as an observer in the European Parliament for Croatia.

== Biography ==
Native Bosnian Croat, Radoš was born in Seonica village in Duvno, Bosnia and Herzegovina. He attended elementary school in Đakovo and gymnasium in Zagreb. In 1983 he graduated from Faculty of Electrical Engineering and Computing of University of Zagreb. From 1983 until 1986 he worked as a professor of history and electrical engineering in Osijek and Đakovo. From 1986 until 1990 he worked as designer of the development of system of power electronics in KONČAR Group. In 1990 he joined Croatian Social Liberal Party where he served as party's vice president until 1998. From 1990 until 1992 he worked as technologist of electronics in bulbs factory in Zagreb. In 1992 he became member of parliament. In 1993 he graduated philosophy and history at Faculty of Humanities and Social Sciences of University of Zagreb. During the war years he was member of reserve in Croatian police. At the time of Zagreb crisis in 1995 he was elected Mayor of Zagreb, but was not confirmed by President Franjo Tuđman. As such, he wasn't formally prepared for mayor duties and had to resign. From 1998 until 2000 he was general secretary of the Croatian Social Liberal Party. In 2011 he graduated at Faculty of Political Science of University of Zagreb.

The HSLS entered an alliance with SDP for the 2000 parliament elections which they won. Following this, Radoš became Croatian Minister of Defence in the government led by Ivica Račan.

During his mandate as minister, the military budget was severely cut as part of a late post-war demilitarization. Mandatory military service was also cut from 12 to 6 months. During his entire mandate, personnel cuts to the army were planned, but never implemented.

Following HSLS's leader Dražen Budiša's exit from the government, HSLS split into two factions, Radoš being a member of the dissident pro-government faction which would go on to create a party called Libra which Radoš became a president of. Despite his support for the government, Radoš previously resigned his post and was succeeded by SDP's Željka Antunović as minister.

Libra, along with Radoš, merged with the Croatian People's Party in 2005, since known as the Croatian People's Party – Liberal Democrats.

=== Member of the European Parliament, 2012–present ===
Since 2014, Radoš has been a member of the Committee on Foreign Affairs. In addition to his committee assignments, he is a member of the parliament’s delegation for relations with Bosnia and Herzegovina and Kosovo and the delegation to the EU-Montenegro Stabilisation and Association Parliamentary Committee.
