= Social Democratic Party of Croatia =

Croatian political party

Social Democratic Party of Croatia Socijaldemokratska partija Hrvatske
- Abbreviation: SDP
- President: Siniša Hajdaš Dončić
- Vice Presidents: See list: Biljana Borzan; Mirela Ahmetović; Mišel Jakšić; Ranko Ostojić
- Founder: Ivica Račan
- Founded: 3 November 1990; 35 years ago
- Preceded by: League of Communists of Croatia (SKH)
- Headquarters: Trg Drage Iblera 9, Zagreb
- Youth wing: SDP Youth Forum
- Membership (2020): 32,000
- Ideology: Social democracy
- Political position: Centre-left
- National affiliation: Left-liberal coalitions (2010–2024); SDP–Možemo! (since 2026)
- European affiliation: Party of European Socialists
- European Parliament group: Progressive Alliance of Socialists and Democrats
- International affiliation: Progressive Alliance; Socialist International
- Colors: Red
- Slogan: "Sloboda. Jednakost. Solidarnost." ("Freedom. Equality. Solidarity.")
- Sabor: 34 / 151
- European Parliament: 4 / 12
- County Prefects: 3 / 21
- Mayors: 19 / 128
- Municipalities: 53 / 428

Party flag

Website
- sdp.hr

The Social Democratic Party of Croatia (Croatian: Socijaldemokratska partija Hrvatske, abbr. SDP) is a social democratic political party in Croatia. The SDP is anti-fascist, progressive, and strongly pro-European. The SDP was formed in 1990 as the successor of the League of Communists of Croatia, the Croatian branch of the League of Communists of Yugoslavia, which had governed Croatia within the Socialist Federal Republic of Yugoslavia since World War II.

The party first won the elections in 2000 and formed a coalition government headed by Ivica Račan. After losing the 2003 general election, the party remained in opposition for eight years. In the 2011 parliamentary election, SDP won 61 (Note: The Kukuriku coalition, in which SDP was a senior partner, won 81 seats all together.) out of 151 seats in the Croatian Parliament, and managed to form the 12th Croatian Government under Zoran Milanović with its partners from the Kukuriku coalition. After SDP and its coalition partners failed to achieve an agreement on forming a new government following the 2015 general election, the party returned to the opposition. Former (Note: According to constitutional amendments introduced in 2000, the President is obliged to freeze his political party membership during his term in office.) SDP member and presidential candidate Ivo Josipović served as the third President of Croatia from 2010 to 2015. Another SDP member, Neven Mimica was the European Commissioner for International Cooperation and Development at the Juncker Commission.

The SDP is a member of the Party of European Socialists (PES), Progressive Alliance of Socialists and Democrats (S&D), Progressive Alliance (PA), and the Socialist International (SI).

== History ==
=== Early 1990s ===
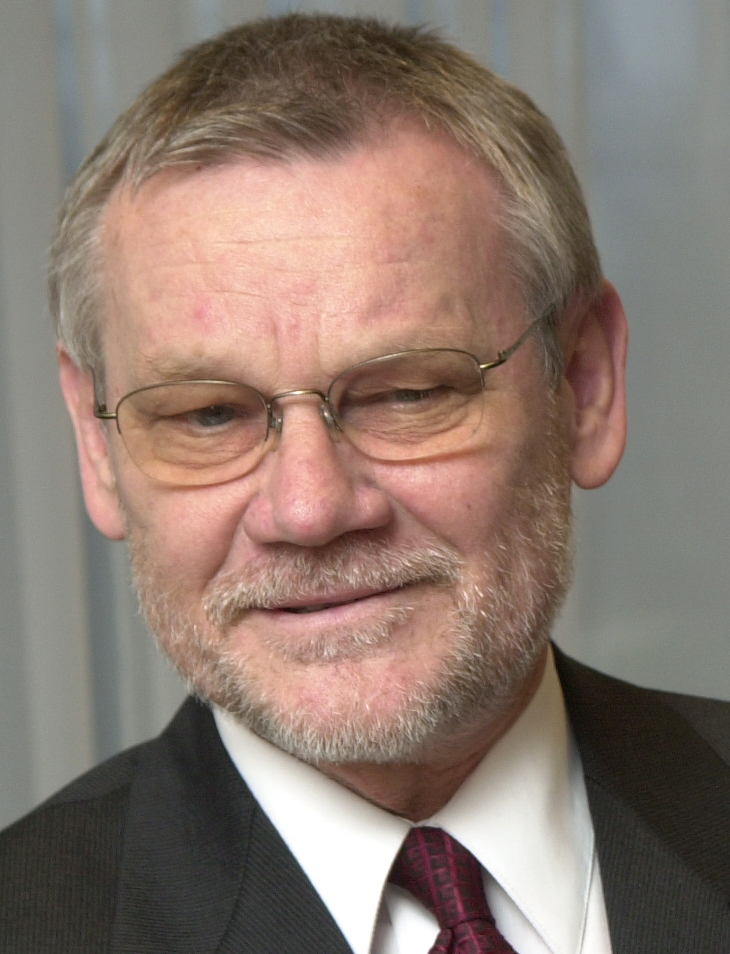
Ivica Račan, founder of SDP and Croatia's Prime Minister from January 2000 to December 2003

The SDP was established on 3 November 1990 by the social democratic faction of the former League of Communists of Croatia (SKH), the Croatian branch of the League of Communists of Yugoslavia (SKJ).

If SDP is claimed successor of Austria-Hungary's Social Democratic Party of Croatia and Slavonia founded on 8 and 9 September 1894, it would be the oldest social democratic party in Yugoslavia, before becoming the Communist Party of Croatia as part of the League of Communists of Yugoslavia.

The SKH delegation led by Ivica Račan, along with their Slovenian counterparts, had abandoned the 14th congress of SKJ in January 1990 following a dispute with the Serbian delegation led by Slobodan Milošević over how SFR Yugoslavia should be reorganised.

At the same time, Croatia was preparing for its first multi-party election following the decision made by SKH in December 1989 which envisioned elections in April and May 1990. In February 1990 the SR Croatia parliament adopted amendments to the constitution which enabled a multi-party system. That same month SKH had rebranded themselves as the "Party of Democratic Reform" (Stranka demokratskih promjena or SDP) and went on to run in the 1990 election as SKH-SDP, coming in second behind the Croatian Democratic Union (HDZ) with 26 percent of votes and a total of 107 seats in all three houses of parliament which had 351 seat.

On 3 November 1990, the party was officially established in its current form, by dropping the initialism SKH from its name. In the August 1992 election, the first election held according to the new Constitution of Croatia which had been adopted on 22 December 1990, SDP won 5.52% of the popular vote and a total of 11 seats in the 138-seat parliament. In 1993 the party re-branded themselves again and changed their name to the "Social Democratic Party" (Socijaldemokratska partija), the name they kept to this day.

=== Merger with SDH ===
In 1990, a parallel Social Democratic Party of Croatia (Croatian: Socijaldemokratska stranka Hrvatske, SDSH) was founded. It was later renamed to the Social Democrats of Croatia (Socijaldemokrati Hrvatske, SDH). Like most parties created at the time, it was opposed to the communist government and wanted Croatia to secede from Yugoslavia, yet it had the distinction of being one of the few to present itself as left-wing. The party founders included many prominent intellectuals, including Antun Vujić and Miroslav Tuđman. This party claimed that it was continuing tradition of the historical Social Democratic Party of Croatia, created in 1894 and merged in 1919 into the Communist Party of Yugoslavia.

In the first 1990 Croatian parliamentary election, SDSH joined the centrist Coalition of People's Accord and fared badly, winning only 21 out of 351 seats. However, its position was strong enough to warrant ministerial posts in the national unity government of Franjo Gregurić which was in power from July 1991 to August 1992. However, its two ministers Bosiljko Mišetić and Zvonimir Baletić defected to the conservative Croatian Democratic Union (HDZ) soon after their appointment.

Before the 1992 parliamentary and presidential elections, SDSH was involved in bitter dispute with the SDP over its rebranding into the Social Democratic Party of Croatia. SDSH claimed that its name was stolen. The election showed SDP to be much stronger party than SDSH, which failed to win parliament seats. At the same time, SDSH leader Antun Vujić finished last in the 1992 presidential race, winning a meagre 0.7 percent of the vote. This ultimately led to SDSH and SDP patching their differences and former being incorporated into the latter in April 1994.

In the following 1995 election, SDP won 8.93 percent of the popular vote and a total of 10 seats in the parliament, coming in fourth behind the Croatian Democratic Union (HDZ), Croatian Peasant Party (HSS) and the Croatian Social Liberal Party (HSLS).

=== Račan government (2000–2003) ===
In August 1998, SDP and HSLS leaders Ivica Račan and Dražen Budiša signed a coalition agreement and proceeded to run together in the January 2000 parliamentary elections. The SDP-HSLS coalition won the election with 38.7% of the vote and 71 out of 151 seats. SDP and HSLS then formed a six-way centre-left coalition government along with the Croatian Peasant Party (HSS), the Liberal Party (LS), Croatian People's Party (HNS), and the Istrian Democratic Assembly (IDS). Račan, as the leader of the strongest party, became prime minister in the first Račan cabinet. This period was marred with constant disagreements among coalition members on various issues. The constitution was changed several times.

Račan had initially offered the post of Speaker of Parliament to Budiša, but Budiša declined hoping to win the upcoming 2000 presidential election. Following Budiša's defeat to Stjepan Mesić in February 2000, Budiša continued to serve as member of Croatian parliament. In July 2001, he opposed Račan government's decision to extradite Croatian army generals which were wanted because of, later in 2013 dismissed, charges for committing war crimes during Croatian War of Independence to the International Criminal Tribunal for the former Yugoslavia (ICTY) which caused considerable turmoil within HSLS.

In June 2001, the Istrian regionalist party Istrian Democratic Assembly (IDS) withdrew from the coalition government and its chairman Ivan Jakovčić resigned his post as Minister of European Integration, citing criticism of the way they governed Istria on the regional level which had been coming from other parties within the ruling coalition. The uneasy coalition broke apart in early July 2002 when Račan formally handed in his resignation following HSLS refusal to support the agreement made with Slovenia concerning the two countries' joint control of the Krško Nuclear Power Plant.

In late July 2002, the second Račan cabinet was formed, with members of the remaining four parties of the original coalition (following the departure of IDS and HSLS) plus two minor liberal parties which had splintered from HSLS, the Party of Liberal Democrats (Libra) and the Liberal Party (LS). This cabinet remained in power until the next elections in November 2003. SDP then ran in the 2003 election as part of a coalition with IDS, Libra and LS, but was defeated by the conservative HDZ. The SDP thus returned to opposition with the coalition winning 43 out of 151 seats in the parliament (34 of which held by SDP).

The January 2000 election win and the defeat of the ruling HDZ was seen as a turning point as it marked the first transition of power in Croatia's young democracy and upon coming into power Račan's government was seen as the country's first staunchly pro-Western government following a decade of the "authoritarian and nationalist rule" of late President Franjo Tuđman. During its term, the country signed a pre-membership agreement with the European Union, which paved the way for the formal opening of membership negotiations in October 2006. Although the six-party coalition government made a clear break from the former regime, it nevertheless failed to handle the growing social problems, unemployment and economic difficulties. Račan struggled to contain factional disputes within the coalition and appeared indecisive in dealing with Western demands to hand over war crimes suspects to the ICTY, as well as with extremists at home who vehemently opposed such extraditions.

=== Opposition (2003–2011) ===
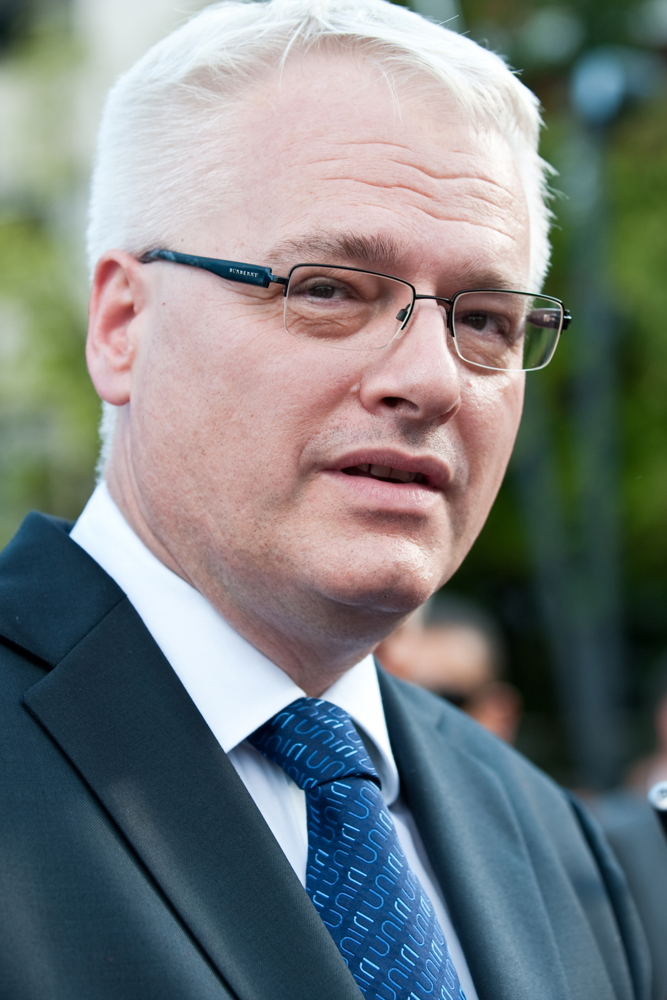
Ivo Josipović, President of Croatia (2010–2015)

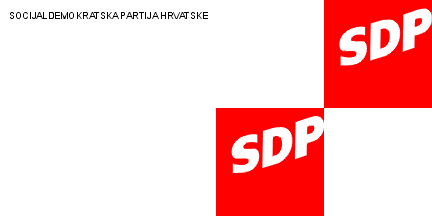
Former flag of the Social Democratic Party of Croatia (2005–2008)

In the 2005 presidential race, SDP opted to support independent incumbent Stjepan Mesić, who succeeded in winning his second term by an overwhelming majority of 65.9% of the vote in the run-off in front of HDZ candidate and runner-up Jadranka Kosor with 34.1%.

In 2007, the party was dealt a blow due to the death of their long-time leader and founder Ivica Račan, who died on 30 April 2007 due to complications from his previously treated kidney cancer, after he stepped down from his chairman post earlier that month. In an extraordinary party convention, former party spokesman Zoran Milanović was elected as their new leader, beating acting chairwoman and former defence minister Željka Antunović in the party election run-off. Other prominent candidates for the post were Zagreb mayor Milan Bandić and former foreign minister Tonino Picula.

For the November 2007 parliamentary election, SDP ran on an economic program with Third Way elements devised by the previously non-partisan economist Ljubo Jurčić, who was also picked to be the party's candidate for the post of prime minister in case of their election victory at a party meeting in July 2007. In the election of 25 November SDP finished a close second behind HDZ, with 56 out of 153 seats. It might have won the domestic election, but as SDP does not participate in diaspora constituency, it lost in the overall tally. Five days after the election, amid speculations that SDP might assemble a governing coalition in spite of them failing to win outright majority, he was replaced in that role by Zoran Milanović. Nevertheless, SDP failed to assemble a governing coalition, and positioned itself as the largest opposition party instead.

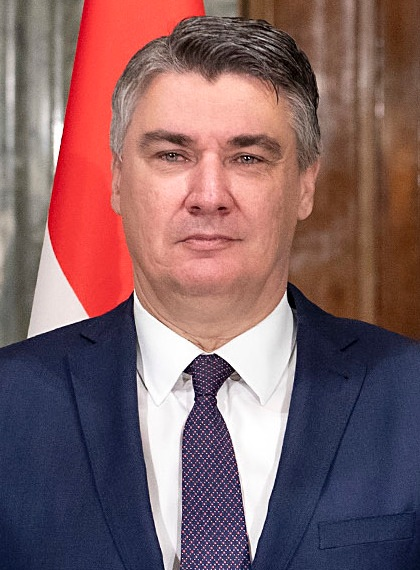
Zoran Milanović, 2nd chairman of the SDP (2007–2016), 10th Prime Minister of Croatia (2011–2016) and 5th President of Croatia (2020–present)

In the subsequent June 2009 local elections, the party failed to make significant gains on the county level, but still managed to achieve some major wins in important cities, due to the adoption of a new election system where mayors and county heads were for the first time elected directly, as opposed to the previous system which employed party lists. SDP recorded mayoral victories in a number of traditionally centre-right leaning coastal cities such as Dubrovnik, Šibenik and Trogir and also managed to win in Vukovar, a city that had been almost destroyed in the Croatian War of Independence and was regarded as HDZ stronghold ever since. They also manage to retain control of the economically most powerful parts of the country, including the capital Zagreb, the northern Adriatic city of Rijeka and also won in Istria (in coalition with IDS).

In the run up to the 2009–10 presidential race, SDP held a primary election for the very first time, in which party nominees Ljubo Jurčić and Ivo Josipović ran. Josipović won the primary by some two-thirds of the vote. Josipović later won the 2009–10 election with 60% of the vote in the second round in front of former SDP member and populist Mayor of Zagreb Milan Bandić (who was expelled that year for running in the elections) and was officially inaugurated on 18 February 2010.

=== Milanović government (2011–15) ===
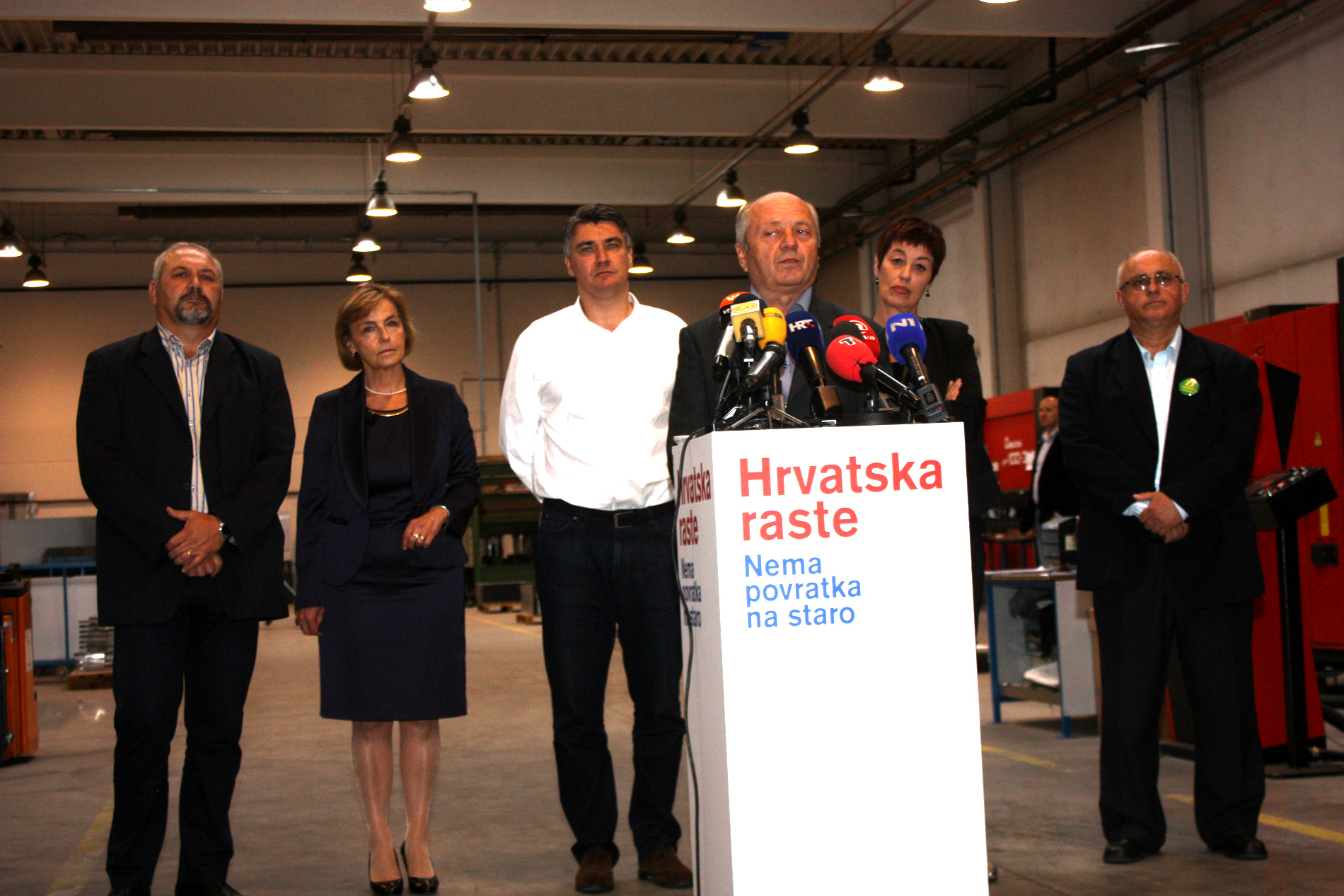
Milanović with other members of the Croatia is Growing coalition, 8 September 2015

In 2010, SDP formed a political alliance known as the Kukuriku coalition with three other centre-left parties – the Croatian People's Party – Liberal Democrats (HNS), Istrian Democratic Assembly (IDS) and the Croatian Party of Pensioners (HSU) – to run in the December 2011 parliamentary election. The coalition unveiled their 21-point campaign program on 15 September 2011 in Zagreb.

The coalition won the election, winning 81 out of 151 seats in the parliament, after which SDP formed a government with two of its junior coalition (HNS and IDS). Party president, Zoran Milanović, took office as the new Prime Minister and leader of his cabinet on 23 December 2011.

The Milanović administration started its mandate by introducing several liberal reforms. During 2012, a Law on medically assisted fertilization was enacted, health education was introduced in all elementary and high schools, and Milanović announced further expansion of rights for same-sex couples. On 1 December 2013, a constitutional referendum was held in Croatia, organized by the citizen initiative For the family, creating a constitutional prohibition against same-sex marriage. SDP was one of the leading forces campaigning against the proposal. The referendum passed with 65% votes in favour. Milanović announced the Life Partnership Act which passed on 15 July 2014.

The government's mandate was marked by several crises the cabinet had to deal with, including a six-year economic recession, the 2013 anti-Cyrillic protests, war veterans protests, the 2015 Croatia–Slovenia border disputes arbitration scandal and the European migrant crisis.

A new fiscalization law and the government's pursuit of dealing with the swiss francs crisis are regarded as some of SDP's biggest successes in power. In January 2015, the government decided to freeze exchange rates for Swiss francs for a year, after a rise in the franc that caused increasingly expensive loans for borrowers in that currency. In August 2015, Milanović announced that Swiss franc loans will be converted into euro-denominated ones.

The administration adopted a number of reforms in taxation to cope with the difficult economic situation amid the Great Recession. It also cut social insurance contributions and public-sector wages. The government succeeded in reducing the budget deficit to 5.3% in 2012, but GDP contracted by 2.2% and public debt reached 69.2%. Milanović's time in office has been marked by several cuts to Croatia's credit rating. The unemployment rate peaked in February 2014 at 22.7%.

A bad economic situation weakened the originally strong public support for the Milanović government, which was demonstrated in the 2013 local elections. In the first European Parliament elections in Croatia in 2013, SDP won 32% of the votes and five MEPs, one less than HDZ, the largest opposition party. The following year SDP's coalition won 29.9% in the 2014 European Parliament elections and four MEPs. The party supported Ivo Josipović in the presidential elections, which were won by Kolinda Grabar-Kitarović from the HDZ. Josipović later formed his own party, Forward Croatia-Progressive Alliance, instead of returning to the SDP. He eventually rejoined the party in 2019.

=== Opposition (2015–present) ===
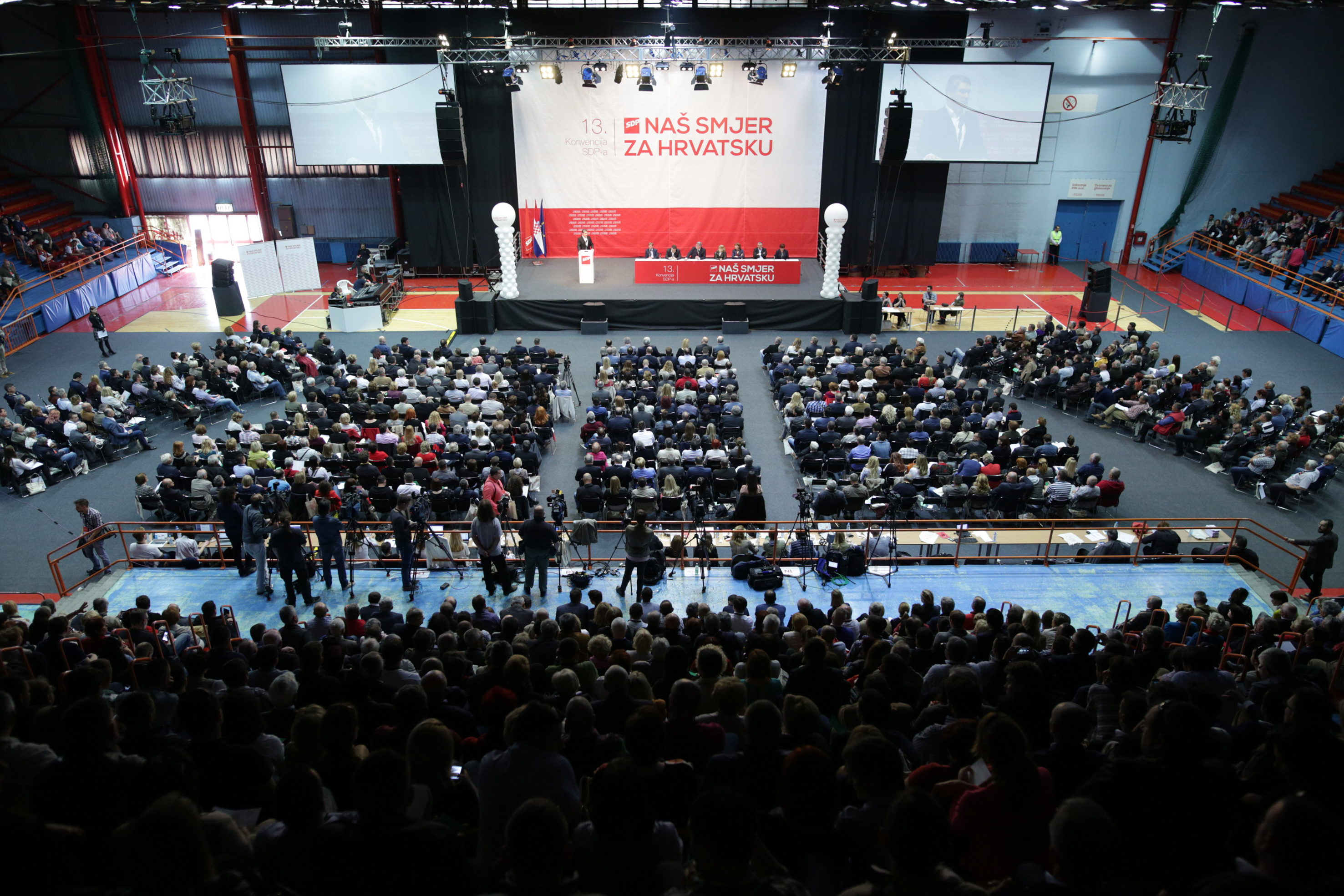
SDP's 13th General Convention, 2016

In the 2015 parliamentary elections, SDP and its coalition partners won the majority in 5 out of 10 electoral districts, and eventually gained 56 out of 151 seats in the Parliament, or 59 since Istrian Democratic Assembly participated in the post-election negotiations on forming new government as de facto member of the coalition. After more than 70 days of negotiations with the Bridge of Independent Lists (MOST) and numerous twists and turns mainly due to MOST frequently changing terms, SDP's coalition failed to achieve agreement with MOST on forming new government, which was formed by the independent Tihomir Orešković who was supported by the centre-right Patriotic Coalition.

On 2 April 2016, elections were held for the party's leadership. Zlatko Komadina, the prefect of Primorje-Gorski Kotar County, who advocated for a "much more social democratic" SDP, ran against Milanović. Milanović was again re-elected president of SDP for the next four years.

A vote of no confidence in Orešković in June 2016 resulted in an early parliamentary election in November which the SDP contested as the largest party in the People's Coalition. Despite being perceived as the favorite to win the election, due to a significant lead in a large number of opinion polls, the People's Coalition won only 54 seats while the Croatian Democratic Union won 58 (61 with coalition partners) in an upset. As a result, Zoran Milanović declared that he would not contest the upcoming leadership election in the SDP and that he would retire from politics once a successor is elected. The first round of the leadership election on 19 November 2016 failed to produce an outright winner, as none of the seven candidates gained the necessary majority of 50% + 1 of cast votes. Davor Bernardić received the most votes (46%) and progressed to the second round, where he faced the runner-up, Ranko Ostojić, who received 22.8% of cast votes. The second round took place on 26 November 2016 and Davor Bernardić was elected the 3rd chairman of the SDP with 64% of cast votes.

In the 2020 parliamentary elections, the SDP achieved its worst result in parliamentary elections since the 1990s, resulting to the resignation of Davor Bernardić the day after the election. Zlatko Komadina took over the temporary duty of party leader until the next internal party elections. Five candidates ran in the party's leader elections, for which voting took place on 26 September and 3 October. Peđa Grbin was chosen as the new leader, who defeated Željko Kolar in the second round. The elections were also marked by allowing only members who had paid their membership fees to vote, which meant that 12,000 out of 32,000 of all members had the right to vote.

In July 2021, intra-party clashes broke out between supporters of Grbin and Bernardić, followed by the expulsion of four MPs on charges of doing damage to party or refusing to actively participate in the May local elections. The same MPs then refused to leave the SDP parliamentary club, and for that they received the support of 14 of their colleagues who refused to vote for their expulsion. The crisis was resolved at a session of the party's presidency when a decision was made to punish 14 supporters of ousted MPs. According to the decision, seven deputies were expelled, including Davor Bernardić, while the remaining seven were warned. In the end, the expelled MPs and those who supported them founded a new parliamentary club called the Social Democrats Club, which had 18 deputies, while the SDP club was left with the remaining 14 deputies, which put them in third place in terms of the number of deputies in the Sabor. On 9 July 2022, they founded a new party named the Social Democrats.

== Organization ==
The party's first and longest-serving president was Ivica Račan. The current party president is Siniša Hajdaš Dončić, who was elected in a leadership election on 21 September 2024 following Peđa Grbin's resignation. Apart from the president and four vice-presidents (Biljana Borzan, Mirela Ahmetović, Ranko Ostojić, Mišel Jakšić), the main governing bodies of the party include the party presidency (Predsjedništvo, consisting of 18 elected members), the head committee (Glavni odbor) and the supervisory committee (Nadzorni odbor).

Like all other parties, the SDP runs local chapters at municipal, city and county levels. It also runs four topical groups – the SDP Youth Forum (Forum mladih), Women's Forum (Socijaldemokratski forum žena), Seniors' Forum (Socijaldemokratski forum seniora) and the SDP Queer Forum.

The SDP has been a member of the Socialist International since November 1999, and a full member of the Party of European Socialists since February 2012. SDP is also a full member of the Progressive Alliance of Socialists and Democrats (S&D) group in the European Parliament as of the accession of Croatia to the EU in 2013.

== Election results ==
The following is a summary of SDP's results in legislative elections for the Croatian parliament. The "Votes won" and "Percentage" columns include sums of votes won by coalitions SDP had been part of. After preferential votes were added to the electoral system, the votes column also includes the statistic of the total number of such votes received by candidates of SDP on coalition lists. The "Total seats won" column includes sums of seats won only by SDP in election. Column "Change" shows how many seats SDP has gained or lost.

=== Legislative (Sabor) ===
Election	In coalition with	Votes	%	Seats	+/–	Government
Election	In coalition with	Coalition		SDP		Government
1990	SSH	1,001,967	35.0 (#2)	107 / 351	▲107	Opposition
1992	None	145,419	5.5 (#3)	11 / 138	▼96	Opposition
1995	None	215,839	8.9 (#4)	10 / 127	▼1	Opposition
2000	HSLS-PGS-SBHS	1,138,318	38.7 (#1)	43 / 151	▲33	Government
2003	LIBRA–IDS-LS	560,593	22.6 (#2)	34 / 151	▼9	Opposition
2007	None	775,690	31.2 (#2)	56 / 151	▲22	Opposition
2011	HNS–IDS–HSU	958,312	40.4 (#1)	61 / 151	▲5	Government
2015	HNS-HSU-HL-AHSS-ZS	744,507	32.31 (#2)	42 / 151	▼19	Opposition
2016	HNS-HSU-HSS	636,602	33.82 (#2)	38 / 151	▼4	Opposition
2020	HSS-GLAS-IDS-HSU-PGS-NLDB	414,615	24.87 (#2)	33 / 151	▼4	Opposition
2024	CENTAR-HSS-GLAS-DO i SIP-NS-R	538,748	25.40 (#2)	37 / 151	▲3	Opposition

=== European Parliament ===
Election	List leader	Coalition	Votes	%	Seats	+/–	EP Group
Election	List leader	Coalition	Coalition		SDP		EP Group
2013	Tonino Picula	HNS–HSU	237,778	32,07 (#2)	5 / 12	New	S&D
2014 (Note: Neven Mimica has been elected as SDP MEP but appointed to be one of the commissioners in the European commission, so although SDP won 3 seats on general elections it de facto had 2 MEPs while SDP gave Mimica's seat to Ivan Jakovčić from IDS as a result of the coalition agreement.)	Neven Mimica	HNS–HSU-IDS- SDSS	275,904	29,93 (#2)	2 / 11	▼3	S&D
2019	Tonino Picula	None	200,976	18,71 (#2)	4 / 12	▲2	S&D
2024	Biljana Borzan	DO i SIP–CENTAR–HSS–GLAS	192,859	25,62 (#2)	4 / 12	0	S&D

=== Presidential ===
Election year(s)	Candidate	1st round		2nd round		Result
Election year(s)	Candidate	Votes	%	Votes	%	Result
1992	Silvije Degen	108,979	4.1 (#5)			Lost
1997	Zdravko Tomac	458,172	21.03 (#2)			Lost
2000	Dražen Budiša	741,837	27.8 (#2)	1,125,969	43.99 (#2)	Lost
2005	Stjepan Mesić	1,089,398	48.92 (#1)	1,454,451	65.93 (#1)	Won
2009–10	Ivo Josipović	640,594	32.42 (#1)	1,339,385	60.26 (#1)	Won
2014–15	Ivo Josipović	687,678	38.46 (#1)	1,082,436	49.26 (#2)	Lost
2019–20	Zoran Milanović	562,783	29.55 (#1)	1,034,170	52.66 (#1)	Won
2024–25	Zoran Milanović	797,938	49.68 (#1)	1,122,859	74.68 (#1)	Won

=== County assemblies ===
County assemblies 2025-2029
County	Seats
Bjelovar-Bilogora County	4 / 37
Brod-Posavina County	4 / 37
Dubrovnik-Neretva County	8 / 37
Istria County	10 / 37
Karlovac County	9 / 37
Koprivnica-Križevci County	14 / 37
Krapina-Zagorje County	22 / 37
Lika-Senj County	2 / 27
Međimurje County	8 / 37
Osijek-Baranja County	9 / 41
Požega-Slavonia County	9 / 31
Primorje-Gorski Kotar County	15 / 41
Šibenik-Knin County	8 / 31
Sisak-Moslavina County	8 / 37
Split-Dalmatia County	8 / 47
Varaždin County	12 / 37
Virovitica-Podravina County	8 / 31
Vukovar-Srijem County	6 / 37
Zadar County	7 / 37
Zagreb	25 / 47
Total	196 / 740

== Party presidents since 1990 ==
No.	Leader	Age	Term start	Term end	Duration
1	Ivica Račan	1944–2007	3 November 1990	11 April 2007	16 years, 159 days
—	Željka Antunović (acting president)	b. 1955	11 April 2007	2 June 2007	52 days
2	Zoran Milanović	b. 1966	2 June 2007	26 November 2016	9 years, 177 days
3	Davor Bernardić	b. 1980	26 November 2016	6 July 2020	3 years, 223 days
—	Zlatko Komadina (acting president)	b. 1958	6 July 2020	3 October 2020	89 days
4	Peđa Grbin	b. 1979	3 October 2020	21 September 2024	3 years, 354 days
5	Siniša Hajdaš Dončić	b. 1974	21 September 2024	present	2 years, 39 days

== See also ==
- Elections in the Social Democratic Party of Croatia
- Cabinet of Ivica Račan I
- Cabinet of Ivica Račan II
- Cabinet of Zoran Milanović
- Left-wing politics in Croatia
