= Miroslav Rožić =

Croatian politician (born 1956)

Miroslav Rožić (born August 31, 1956) is a Croatian right-wing politician. As a former vice-president of Croatian Party of Rights (HSP), he served as a representative in Croatian Parliament between 2001 and 2007. He was previously a member of the Croatian Social Liberal Party (HSLS) and is currently a member of the Croatian Peasant Party (HSS).

== Biography ==
Rožić was born in Zagreb, as a fourth generation Agramer. His family was very well-to-do before the communists nationalised their property in 1945. His father was considered to be an Ustasha sympathizer and bourgeois, so in socialist Yugoslavia he had to accept jobs he was over-qualified for.

Rožić obtained a degree in biology from the Faculty of Mathematics and Science at the University of Zagreb and pursued a scientific career. He planned to defend his doctoral dissertation in 1991 when war erupted in Croatia. Rožić joined the Croatian Army where he served as a translator, due to his fluent use of English, German and Italian.

He was also a member of Croatian Social Liberal Party (HSLS), and in 1993 he was elected to Zagreb city council. In 1995, Rožić and his close friend Tonči Tadić left HSLS because of conflicts with party's president Dražen Budiša and party's positioning on the centre-left part of the political spectrum. The same year they joined the HSP.

In 1997, Rožić was elected to the now non-existing upper house of Croatian Parliament. He and Tadić became major figures in HSP and refreshed party's image. Rožić became a party leader in Zagreb and ran for mayor in 2005, finishing solid third. In September 2007, after a spat with Anto Đapić, both Rožić and Tadić left HSP.

In October 2009, Rožić joined the Zagreb branch of the Croatian Peasant Party (HSS).
