= Hrvoje Kraljević =

Croatian mathematician and politician

Hrvoje Kraljević (born 16 March 1944) is a Croatian mathematician and a former politician.

He was born in Zagreb. He graduated theoretical physics in 1966 and received his PhD in mathematics in 1973 at the Faculty of Science, University of Zagreb. He worked at the Faculty since 1966, becoming a full professor in 1982. He was awarded fellowships in the United States (Princeton, 1974/75), France (Palaiseau, 1978) and Italy (Trento in 1979, 1981).

As a mathematician, he investigates representation theory, functional analysis and algebra. His most significant result is the research and of unitary and nonunitary dual group SU(n, 1), index generalization for semisimple Banach algebras, contributions to the research of Landau-type inequalities for infinitesimal generators to the theory of almost-summability.

He was the director of Department of Mathematics at the Faculty of Science (1983–89), dean of the Faculty (1991–98), Editor-in-Chief of the journal Glasnik matematički (1990–1992) and editor of the conference proceedings Functional Analysis (1982, 1986, 1990, 1994). He was awarded Ruđer Bošković Science Award in 1983. He became a corresponding member of the Croatian Academy of Sciences and Arts in 1992.

He served as the Minister of Science and Technology in Croatia in 2000–2002, as a Member of Parliament and Chairman of the Parliamentary Committee for Science, Higher Education and Culture in 2002–2003.
