= Slavonia-Baranja Croatian Party =

Slavonia-Baranja Croatian Party (Croatian: Slavonsko-baranjska hrvatska stranka or SBHS) was a regional political party in Croatia.

It was founded in 1992 in Slavonia. It was usually allied with Social Democratic Party of Croatia.

From 1995 to 2003 it was represented in the Croatian Parliament.

At the 2003 Croatian parliamentary election, the alliance of the Croatian People's Party (HNS) with the Alliance of Primorje - Gorski Kotar and the Slavonia-Baranja Croatian Party won 8.0% of the popular vote and 11 out of 151 seats, 10 seats of them occupied by the HNS. None of these seats were for the SBHS, so it lost its seat.

In May 2008 it merged into HDSSB.

== Electoral history ==
=== Legislative ===
Election	In coalition with	Votes won (coalition totals)	Percentage	Seats won	Change
1995	HSS-IDS-HNS-HKDU	441,390	18.26%	1 / 127	▲1
2000	SDP-HSLS-PGS	1,138,318	38.70%	1 / 151	Steady
2003	HNS-PGS	198,781	8.0%	0 / 151	▼1
2007	None	957	0.04%	0 / 151	Steady
