= Silvije Degen =

Croatian lawyer and politician

Silvije Degen (born 15 June 1942 in Bjelovar) is a Croatian lawyer and politician from Zagreb.

Silvije Degen, a native of Zagreb, in 1980s became one of the best known lawyers in Yugoslavia. This was due to his impeccable fashion sense and tendency to take high-profile criminal cases, best known being the trial of Andrija Artuković, whom he defended unsuccessfully.

In the early 1990s, Degen entered politics, becoming a leader of the Socialist Party of Croatia. As such, he made a minor upset in the 1992 Croatian presidential election, by finishing fifth with 108,979 or 4.07% of the vote.
