= Croatian Republican Union =

Croatian Republican Union Hrvatska republikanska zajednica
- Leader: Mario Marcos Ostojić
- Founded: 1951 (as Croatian Republican Party)
- Dissolved: 2010
- Merged into: Croatian Growth
- Headquarters: Zagreb
- Ideology: Nationalism; Capitalism
- Political position: Right-wing

Website
- http://www.hrz.hr/

The Croatian Republican Union (Croatian: Hrvatska republikanska zajednica or HRZ) was a political party in Croatia.

== History ==
It was formed in 1951 in Buenos Aires by Ivan Oršanić as the Croatian Republican Party. The party was moved to Croatia in 1991, after democratic reforms in the country.

== Party presidents ==
1. Ivan Oršanić (1951-1968)
2. Ivo Korsky (1968-1991)
