= 2000 Croatian parliamentary election =

- 3 January 2000
- All 151 seats in the Chamber of Representatives; 76 seats needed for a majority
- Turnout: 70.85% (▲2.06pp)
Party	Leader	Vote %	Seats	+/–
SDP–HSLS–PGS–SBHS	Ivica Račan	39.25	71	+48
HDZ	Zlatko Mateša	27.04	46	−29
HSS–IDS–HNS–LS–ASH	Zlatko Tomčić	14.92	24	+7
HSP–HKDU	Anto Đapić	5.30	5	0
Minority lists
SNS	Milan Đukić	47.72	1	−1
DZMH	Tibor Santo	42.88	1	New
HSS	Zdenka Čuhnil	40.62	1	New
SRURH	Borislav Graljuk	34.10	1	New
Independents	Furio Radin	78.91	1	0
This lists parties that won seats. See the complete results below.
Result by constituency
Prime Minister before	Prime Minister after
Zlatko Mateša; HDZ	Ivica Račan; SDP

Parliamentary elections were held in Croatia on 3 January 2000 to elect members of the Chamber of Representatives.

The ruling Croatian Democratic Union entered the elections weakened by a series of corruption scandals that came to light in the previous parliamentary term and fractures between its hardline nationalists and more moderate members. However, the most important factor was the deteriorating health of the party leader and Croatian president Franjo Tuđman, which left no successor within the party.

On the other side, two major Croatian opposition parties – the Social Democratic Party of Croatia and Croatian Social Liberal Party – had their coalition formally agreed in 1998 and spent more than a year preparing for the elections. At first, they were to run together with the Croatian Peasant Party, Croatian People's Party, Istrian Democratic Assembly and Liberal Party, but as Tuđman's condition worsened, leaders of the SDP and HSLS concluded that they could win elections even without the four other parties, which later formed a separate bloc.

On 25 May, the governing HDZ and the six mainstream opposition parties signed an agreement to develop a consensus-based legislative framework for the upcoming parliamentary elections. This agreement also included a commitment to restructure Croatian Radiotelevision (HRT) as a public broadcaster. As before all previous elections since the breakup of Yugoslavia, the electoral laws were altered in an attempt to improve the chances for the ruling party; this included a new voting system and redistricting. The first-past-the-post constituencies introduced in the previous election were scrapped and proportional representation was implemented (with the exception of ethnic minority seats). The country was divided into ten electoral districts, all drawn in order to maximise the support for HDZ. Each district had to elect 14 members with an electoral threshold of 5%.

Due to Tuđman's illness and death in December 1999, the elections were repeatedly postponed for constitutional reasons. There was speculation about elections being held during the Christmas holidays in order to have as many Croatian expatriates (traditionally HDZ supporters) in the country, but the date of 3 January was chosen as the most suitable. As election day came, the outcome became more certain. The campaign was brief and relatively uneventful with the HDZ being visibly weakened and demoralised by the death of its long-term leader. On election day, voter turnout – the highest since 1990 – indicated the desire to see a change of government.

Following the elections, Social Democratic Party leader Ivica Račan was appointed prime minister on 27 January 2000, by a decree of Acting President and Speaker of the outgoing assembly of Parliament, Vlatko Pavletić. The appointment was confirmed by a parliamentary vote on 2 February in which 122 of 151 MPs voted in favor and one against the cabinet, while one MP abstained. Račan led a coalition of SDP and HSLS, which together with a bloc of four other parties held a supermajority in parliament, allowing them to amend the Constitution and transform Croatia from a semi-presidential system into an incomplete parliamentary system in November 2000, and abolish the upper chamber, the Chamber of Counties, in March 2001. The constitutional changes of 2000 greatly limited the power of the president, but retained the direct election of the office.

== Results ==
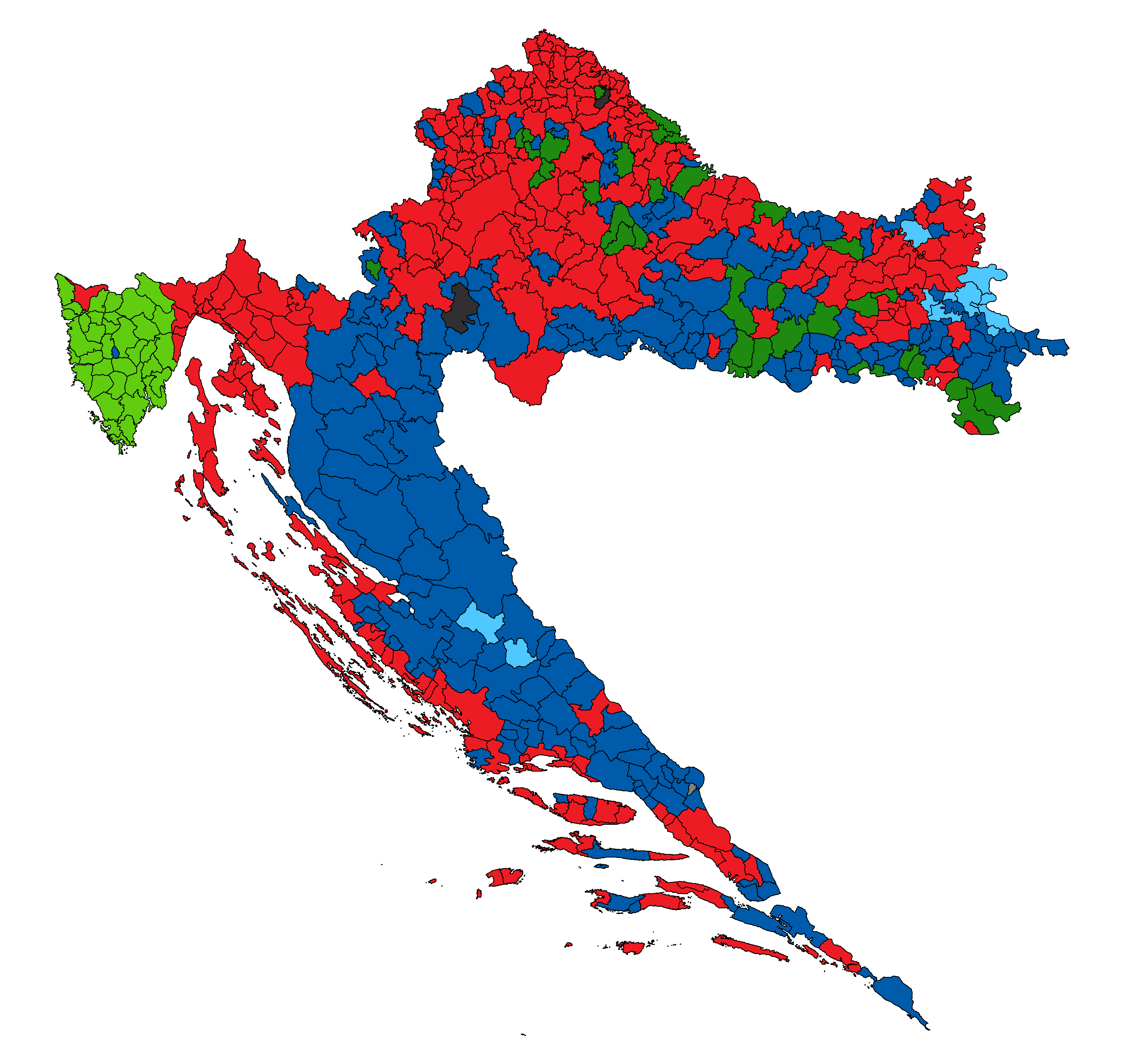
Results of the election based on the majority of votes in each municipality of Croatia SDP-HSLS coalition HDZ HSS-HNS coalition IDS-HSS-HNS coalition SDSS HSP-HKDU coalition HČSP

Party	Votes	%	Seats
SDP–HSLS–SBHS–PGS	1,138,318	39.25	71
Croatian Democratic Union	784,192	27.04	46
HSS–IDS–LS–HNS–ASH	432,527	14.92	24
HSP–HKDU	153,708	5.30	5
Croatian Party of Pensioners	52,717	1.82	0
HP–NH–HČSP	52,329	1.80	0
Croatian Peasant Peoples' Party	39,867	1.37	0
Croatian Popular Party	39,743	1.37	0
Croatian Party of Rights 1861	30,018	1.04	0
Independent Democratic Serb Party	22,828	0.79	0
Socialist Labour Party of Croatia	17,396	0.60	0
HKDS–KDM–INS–IPS	15,583	0.54	0
Croatian Green Party	12,972	0.45	0
Croatian Civic Peasant Party	11,762	0.41	0
HDS–RPS	11,145	0.38	0
HDSS–HSRS–NSP	8,522	0.29	0
DPS–ZDS	7,360	0.25	0
Croatian Independent Democrats	6,994	0.24	0
Dalmatian Action	6,388	0.22	0
National Democratic Party	6,188	0.21	0
Croatian Party of Natural Law	4,593	0.16	0
Movement for Human Rights–Party of Environmentally Conscious Citizens	3,758	0.13	0
Croatian Republican Union	3,309	0.11	0
Croatian Plans Party	2,734	0.09	0
Serb People's Party	2,647	0.09	0
Party of Croatian Revival	2,370	0.08	0
Christian Social Union	1,913	0.07	0
Croatian Dalmatian Home	1,788	0.06	0
Istrian Party	1,705	0.06	0
Homeland Civic Party	1,687	0.06	0
Croatian Republicans	1,511	0.05	0
Croatian Defence Order	1,003	0.03	0
Social Democratic Union of Croatia	798	0.03	0
Party of Danube Serbs	721	0.02	0
Coastal Democratic Centre	607	0.02	0
Party of Democratic Action of Croatia	100	0.00	0
Independents	18,134	0.63	0
National minorities			5
Total	2,899,935	100.00	151
Valid votes	2,899,935	98.37	
Invalid/blank votes	47,926	1.63	
Total votes	2,947,861	100.00	
Registered voters/turnout	4,046,508	72.85	
Source: Global Elections Database, Psephos

=== Minority seats ===
National minorities elected five representatives through a separate election system: Milan Đukić (47.7% of votes) for the Serb national minority, Tibor Santo (42.8%) for the Hungarian minority, Furio Radin (78.9%) for the Italian minority, Zdenka Čuhnil (40.6%) for the Czech and Slovak minorities and Borislav Graljuk (34.1%) for the Austrian, German, Jewish, Rusyn and Ukrainian minorities.

=== Composition ===
Government	Opposition
Government: / SDP / HSLS / PGS / SBHS / HSS / IDS / HNS / Liberal / Minorities; Opposition: / HDZ / HSP / HKDU
