= Istrian Democratic Assembly =

Political party in Croatia

Istrian Democratic Assembly Istarski demokratski sabor Dieta democratica istriana
- Abbreviation: IDS
- Leader: Loris Peršurić
- Founder: Ivan Pauletta; Elio Martinčić; Mario Sandrić
- Founded: 14 February 1990
- Headquarters: Pula
- Membership (2018): 2,300
- Ideology: Regionalism (Istrian); Liberalism (Croatian); Social liberalism; Pro-Europeanism
- Political position: Centre to centre-left
- National affiliation: Restart Coalition (2011–2015, 2020); Amsterdam Coalition (2018–2020); Our Croatia (2023–)
- Regional affiliation: Liberal South East European Network
- European affiliation: Alliance of Liberals and Democrats for Europe
- European Parliament group: Renew Europe (2019–2024)
- International affiliation: Liberal International
- Colours: Light green
- Sabor: 2 / 151 (1%)
- European Parliament: 0 / 12 (0%)
- County Prefects: 0 / 21
- Mayors: 5 / 128
- Assembly of Istria County: 23 / 37

Website
- ids-ddi.com

The Istrian Democratic Assembly (Croatian: Istarski demokratski sabor, Italian: Dieta democratica istriana or IDS-DDI) is a centre to centre-left, regionalist, liberal political party in Croatia primarily operating in Istria County.

IDS was founded on 14 February 1990 by the writer Ivan Pauletta. IDS embraces principles of respect for human rights and freedoms, regionalism and historical characteristics of Istria, protection of private property and anti-fascism. Party advocates decentralization of Croatia, further development of the Adriatic Euroregion and the establishment of a transnational and cross-border euro-region encompassing the whole of Istria. The party president is currently Dalibor Paus, municipal mayor of Barban. IDS held the Ministry of European Integration between 2000 and 2001 in the Cabinet of Ivica Račan and Ministry of Tourism between 2011 and 2015 in the Cabinet of Zoran Milanović. IDS member Boris Miletić serves as current County Prefect of the Istrian County, while former prefect Valter Flego serves as a member of the European Parliament. All prefects of Istria County were members of IDS. In addition, out of 10 towns in Istria county, IDS rules over 5.

IDS is member of the Liberal International and Alliance of Liberals and Democrats for Europe.

== Symbols ==
The three rams on the party coat of arms represent a historical symbol of the region, which is also represented by the ram in the fourth of the five parts of the crown resting atop the Croatian coat of arms, 25-field white and red chequerboard, on the Croatian flag.

== History ==
The party was founded in 1990 by Ivan Pauletta, Elio Martinčić and Mario Sandrić, on the eve of the first multi-party elections in Croatia after communism. The party decided not to participate, thus allowing the post-communist Social Democratic Party of Croatia (SDP) to sweep the region's votes.

The party was led by Ivan Jakovčić between 1991 and 2014. IDS instead made its electoral debut in the 1992 elections and used the collapse of the SDP to take all three Istrian constituencies.

This result turned Istria into an area of significant concern for Croatian President Franjo Tuđman and his Croatian Democratic Union (HDZ), which had dominated every other region in Croatia. For the first elections for Croatian Chamber of Counties, which also coincided with the first election for newly formed Istria County, state-controlled media launched an unprecedented media blitz directed almost exclusively at Istria. This effort spectacularly backfired as Istrian voters gave almost three quarters of their votes to IDS. After that no party challenged IDS supremacy in Istria, at least not directly.

The main policy of the IDS is intercession of cultural and economical identity of Istria and equal status for Italian and Croatian in Istria. This was in opposition to Tuđman and his hard-line nationalism. Other Croatian political parties were more pragmatic, and IDS cooperated with them in the Croatian Parliament and during elections. In Istria, however, IDS is bitterly opposed by local branches of SDP, as well as their former member and first Istrian prefect Luciano Delbianco who had defected and formed a new party called Istrian Democratic Forum.

IDS was briefly part of the national government following 2000 parliamentary and presidential elections. One year later, IDS, dissatisfied with the way Ivica Račan and his coalition partners treated Istria, left the government, although they continued to support it in Parliament.

In 2006, IDS joined the Alliance of Liberals and Democrats for Europe (ALDE) Party.

From 2010–2015, IDS was a member of the Kukuriku coalition. Its member Darko Lorencin served as the minister of tourism in the Croatian government; he is a cousin of Beatrice Lorenzin: they are of a same Italian-Croat family.

In the Croatian Parliament, Damir Kajin most frequently acted as the party's spokesperson, and he headed the party list in the 2007 elections where the party gained 3 representatives. Kajin was however removed from the party's membership on 3 January 2013 after forming his own coalition for the 2013 local elections in Istria. This reduced the IDS from three to two representatives in the Croatian Sabor, and forced the party's parliamentary club to dissolve due to insufficient membership.

On 4 February 2022, the party's presidency launched disciplinary proceedings against former President Boris Miletić, leading Miletić to leave party a day later and leaving the IDS without an Istrian county prefect for the first time since the counties was introduced in 1993.

== Election results ==
=== Parliament (Sabor) ===
Election	Coalition	Votes	%	Seats	+/–	Government
Election	Coalition	Coalition		IDS		Government
1992	DA-PGS	83,623	3.18 (7th)	4 / 138	New	Opposition
1995	HSS-HNS-HKDU-SBHS	441,390	18.26 (2nd)	3 / 127	▼1	Opposition
2000	HSS-HNS-LS-SDA	432,527	14.70 (3rd)	4 / 151	▲1	Government
2003	SDP-LIBRA–LS	560,593	22.6 (2nd)	4 / 151	0	Opposition
2007	None	38,267	1.5 (4th)	3 / 151	▼1	Opposition
2011	Kukuriku Coalition	958,312	40.4 (1st)	2 / 151	▼1	Government
2015	PGS-RI	42,193	1.83 (4th)	3 / 151	▲1	Opposition
2016	PGS-RI	43,180	2.27 (5th)	3 / 151	0	Opposition
2020	Restart Coalition	414,615	24.87 (2nd)	3 / 151	0	Opposition
2024	Our Croatia	47,655	2.25 (7th)	2 / 151	▼1	Opposition

=== European Parliament ===
Election	List leader	Coalition	Votes	%	Seats	+/–	EP Group
Election	List leader	Coalition	Coalition		IDS		EP Group
2013	Did not run (Note: IDS leader Ivan Jakovčić ran with his independent list and won 3.86%)						
2014	Tonino Picula	Kukuriku Coalition	275,904	29.93 (#2)	1 / 11	▲1	ALDE
2019	Valter Flego	Amsterdam Coalition	55,806	5.19 (#5)	1 / 12	0	RE
2024	Valter Flego	Fair Play List 9 (Note: Including also NPS, SDSS, HSLS, HNS, NS-R, SD, D, PGS and RI.)	41,710	5.54 (#5)	0 / 12	▼1	–

=== Presidential ===
Election year(s)	Candidate	1st round		2nd round		Result
Election year(s)	Candidate	Votes	%	Votes	%	Result
2009–10	Damir Kajin	76,411	3.91 (#8)			Lost
2014–15	end. Ivo Josipović (SDP)	687,678	38.46 (#1)	1,082,436	49.26 (#2)	Lost
2019–20	end. Zoran Milanović (SDP)	562,783	29.55 (#1)	1,034,170	52.66 (#1)	Won
2024–25	end. Zoran Milanović (Ind.)	797,938	49.68 (#1)	1,122,859	74.68 (#1)	Won

== See also ==
- Istrian identity
