= Liberal Party (Croatia) =

Defunct Croatian political party

Liberal Party Liberalna stranka
- Founder: Vlado Gotovac
- Founded: 24 January 1998
- Dissolved: 27 April 2006
- Split from: Croatian Social Liberal Party
- Merged into: Croatian Social Liberal Party
- Ideology: Social liberalism
- European affiliation: European Liberal Democrat and Reform Party
- International affiliation: Liberal International
- Colours: Yellow; Blue

The Liberal Party (Croatian: Liberalna stranka or LS) was a Croatian social-liberal political party active between January 1998 and April 2006. During its existence the party ran in two general elections (in 2000 and 2003) and in each election won two seats in the 151-seat Sabor. LS was a member of Liberal International and the European Liberal Democrat and Reform Party. Its last leader was Zlatko Benašić.

The party was formed in January 1998 following a party split in November 1997 when a faction led by Vlado Gotovac, then chairman of Croatian Social Liberal Party (HSLS), left the party because of internal power struggles which resulted in former chairman Dražen Budiša taking back control of the party. Gotovac was joined by other prominent liberals such as Osijek mayor Zlatko Kramarić and historian Ivo Banac.

In 2000, the party had two representatives in the Parliament and had one minister in a coalition government with the much larger Social Democratic Party of Croatia. In 2002 another HSLS faction split from the party after party leader Dražen Budiša announced pulling out of the ruling coalition. They formed Party of Liberal Democrats (LIBRA), and its members participated in the Cabinet of Ivica Račan II.

LS confirmed their two representatives in the Parliament in the 2003 elections, in an alliance with the social democrats, but became part of the opposition.

After the 2003 election, party leader Ivo Banac announced the merger of LS with the Croatian People's Party and LIBRA into one big liberal party, but this initiative was opposed by a faction led by Zlatko Kramarić. Banac was replaced at the party convention.

After the 2005 local elections Zlatko Kramarić started merger negotiations with the Croatian Social Liberal Party (HSLS). That prompted a group of dissidents in Split to form a new party called Dalmatian Liberal Party.

Liberal Party formally ceased to exist with all of its membership and party infrastructure re-joining HSLS in April 2006. In the meantime, LIBRA (Party of Liberal Democrats) merged with Croatian People's Party (HNS) in February 2005.

== Presidents ==
- Vlado Gotovac (1998–2000)
- Božo Kovačević (acting) (2000)
- Zlatko Kramarić (2000–2003)
- Ivo Banac (2003–2004)
- Zlatko Benašić (2004–2006)

== Election history ==
Election	In coalition with	Votes won (coalition totals)	Percentage	Seats won (LS only)	Change	Government
2000	HSS-IDS-HNS-ASH	432,527	14.70%	2 / 151	▲2	Government
2003	SDP-IDS-LIBRA	560,593	22.60%	2 / 151	Steady	Opposition

== See also ==
- Liberalism in Croatia
