= 2003 Croatian parliamentary election =

- 23 November 2003
- All 152 seats in the Croatian Parliament; 77 seats needed for a majority
- Turnout: 61.65% (▼9.20pp)
Party	Leader	Vote %	Seats	+/–
HDZ	Ivo Sanader	33.91	66	+20
SDP–IDS–SLD–LS	Ivica Račan	22.61	43	−6
HNS–PGS–SBHS	Vesna Pusić	8.02	11	+6
HSS	Zlatko Tomčić	7.15	9	−7
HSP–ZDS–MS	Anto Đapić	6.38	8	+4
HSLS–DC	Dražen Budiša	4.05	3	−22
HSU		3.97	3	+3
HDSS coalition	Ivo Lončar	1.95	1	0
Minority lists
SDSS	Vojislav Stanimirović	57.66	3	New
SDAH	Šemso Tanković	59.10	1	New
DZMH	Jene Adam	42.01	1	0
HSS	Zdenka Čuhnil	39.21	1	0
NNZ–ZUPSH	Nikola Mak	14.29	1	New
Independents	Furio Radin	79.83	1	0
This lists parties that won seats. See the complete results below.
Result by constituency
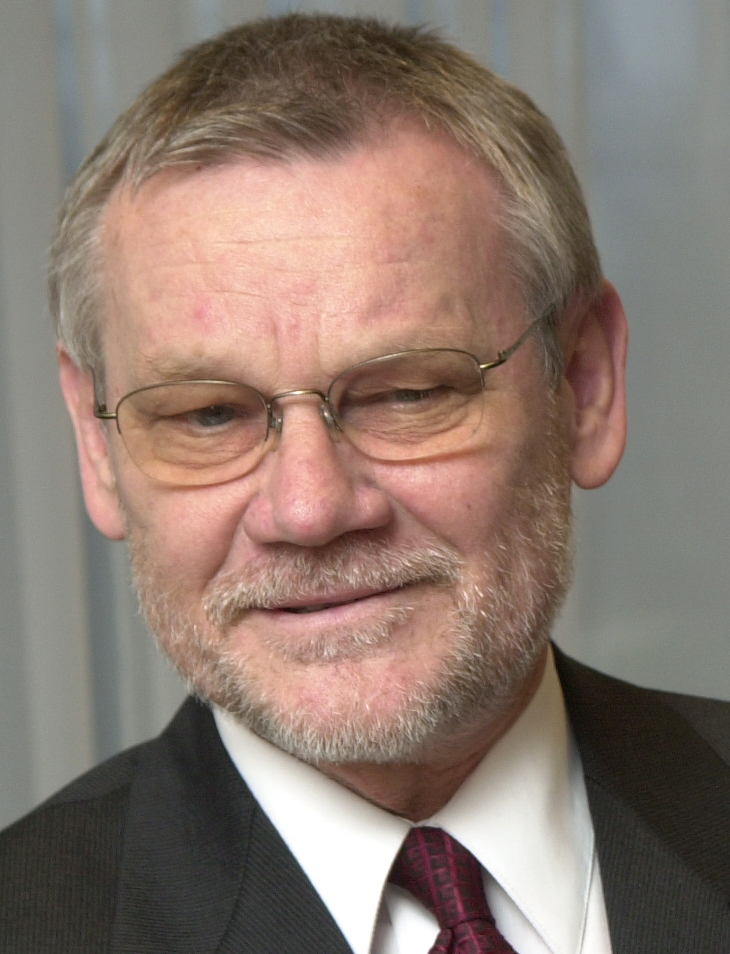

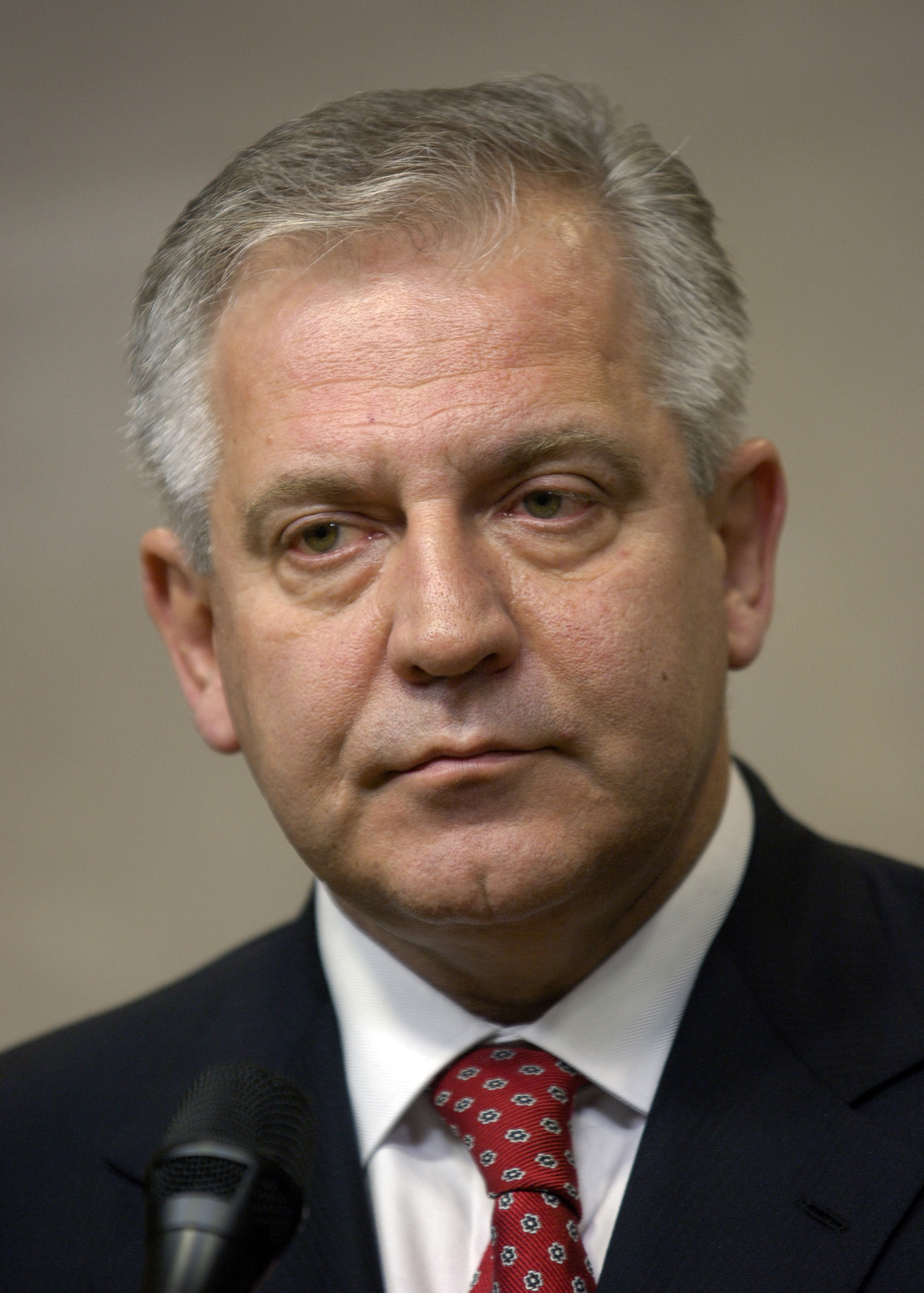
Prime Minister before	Prime Minister after
Ivica Račan; SDP	Ivo Sanader; HDZ

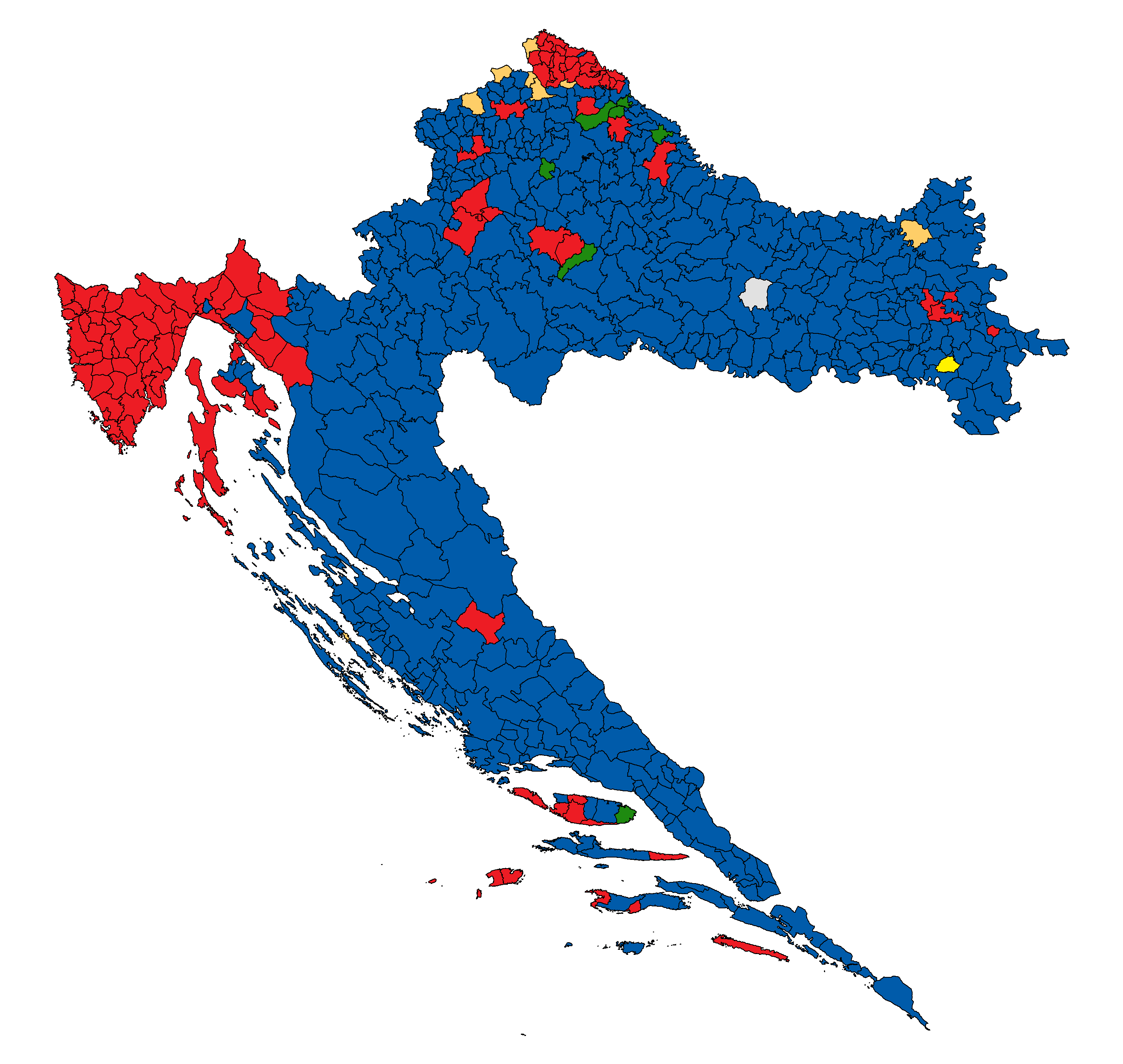
Results of the election based on the majority of votes in each municipality of Croatia HDZ SDP - IDS - Libra - LS HNS - PGS - SBHS HSS HSLS - DC NL Vlado Zec

Parliamentary elections were held in Croatia on 23 November 2003 to elect all 151 members of parliament. They were the fifth parliamentary elections to take place since the first multi-party elections in 1990. Voter turnout was 61.7%. The result was a victory for the opposition Croatian Democratic Union (HDZ) which won a plurality of 66 seats, but fell short of the 76 needed to form a government. HDZ chairman Ivo Sanader was named the eighth Prime Minister of Croatia on 23 December 2003, after parliament passed a confidence motion in his government cabinet, with 88 MPs voting in favor, 29 against and 14 abstaining. The ruling coalition going into the elections, consisting of the Social Democratic Party (SDP), Croatian People's Party (HNS), Croatian Peasant Party (HSS), Party of Liberal Democrats (Libra) and the Liberal Party (LS), did not contest the elections as a single bloc; the SDP ran with the Istrian Democratic Assembly (IDS), the Party of Liberal Democrats (Libra) and the Liberal Party, HNS ran with the Alliance of Primorje-Gorski Kotar (PGS) and the Slavonia-Baranja Croatian Party (SBHS), while HSS ran on its own.

== General information ==
There are 10 electoral units based on geography and population. In each unit, 14 candidates are elected on proportional electoral system. The election threshold is 5%.

In addition, 8 candidates are elected to represent national minorities.

The citizens that live outside Croatian borders vote in a separate electoral unit. The number of representatives elected from this unit will be determined after the elections, based on how many people actually vote in Croatia, so that there is equal value of votes both inside and outside Croatia. For reference, the number of diaspora seats in the 2000-2003 Sabor was six.

Total: 140 domestic seats + 8 minority seats + 4 diaspora seats.

Distribution of minority seats:

- Serbs: 3
- Hungarians: 1
- Italians: 1
- Czechs and Slovaks: 1
- Austrians, Bulgarians, Germans, Poles, Romani, Romanians, Rusyns, Russians, Turks, Ukrainians, Vlachs and Jews: 1
- Albanians, Bosniaks, Montenegrins, Macedonians, Slovenes: 1

== Parties and coalitions ==
Pre-election coalitions:

- DC and HSLS, in all electoral units
- SDP and IDS, in the 8th electoral unit (the county of Istria et al.)
- HB and HIP, in all electoral units
- SDP and Libra in the 2nd, 3rd, 4th and 10th electoral unit
- SDP and LS, in the 4th and 6th electoral unit
- HNS and SBHS, in the 4th and 5th electoral unit (counties of Slavonia)
- HNS and PGS, in the 7th and 8th electoral unit (Northern seacoast counties)

== Opinion polls ==
Date	Polling Organisation/Client	Sample size	HDZ	SDP	HNS	HSS	HSLS	Other	Undecided	Lead
Nov 2003	Prizma		32%	17%	10%	9%	9%			15%
17 Nov 2003	Večernji list	1800	30.3%	23.3%		6.4%	4.7%			7%
14 Nov 2003	Media Metar	1000	24.3%	22.4%		9.6%	8.2%			1.9%
7 Nov 2003	Prizma		35.4%	24.1%	9.5%	7.6%	4.8%			11.4%
3 Nov 2003	Večernji list		22.3%	17.4%						4.9%
28 Oct 2003	Nacional		33.8%	21.6%	6.4%	8.0%	5.7%			12.2%
25 Oct 2003	Jutarnji list		24.9%	15.5%	6%	9.4%	8.4%		14.6%	9.4%
Sep 2003	Večernji list		21.9%	20.6%						1.3%
Sep 2003	Puls		28%	18%	8%	11%	9%			10%
20 June 2003	IRI	-	23%	16%	9%	9%	4%		22%	7%
26 March 2003	Unknown	-	22%	13%	9%	10%				9%
17–18 February 2003	Globus	700	21.6%	18.5%	9.4%	7.5%	5.5%		19.1%	3.1%

== Results ==
The number of diaspora mandates was reduced by two compared to previous elections due to somewhat lower diaspora turnout. Due to distribution according to the d'Hondt method, the independent lists for diaspora were not allocated seats even if they received more than 5% of the total votes.

Party	Votes	%	Seats
Croatian Democratic Union	840,692	33.91	66
SDP–IDS–SLD–LS	560,593	22.61	43
HNS–PGS–SBHS	198,781	8.02	11
Croatian Peasant Party	177,359	7.15	9
HSP–ZDS–MS	158,073	6.38	8
HSLS–DC	100,335	4.05	3
Croatian Party of Pensioners	98,537	3.97	3
HČSP–HKDU–HDSS–HDC–DPS	48,419	1.95	1
HIP–Croatian Bloc	37,954	1.53	0
DEMOKRŠĆANI–HKDS–HGSS–HDRS–JHS	26,281	1.06	0
Croatian Party of Rights 1861	18,875	0.76	0
ZS–SNA POKRET ZELENIH–PGSU–ZELENI SND	16,401	0.66	0
BV TREĆI BLOK–SU	15,591	0.63	0
Socialist Labour Party of Croatia	15,515	0.63	0
Greens of Croatia	15,090	0.61	0
HPS–HP	11,718	0.47	0
Democratic Social Union – Power of the People	10,664	0.43	0
ASH–JSD	8,123	0.33	0
Croatian Veterans' Party	6,280	0.25	0
Istrian Social Democratic Forum	5,685	0.23	0
Rule of Law Alliance	4,524	0.18	0
POL–INS	4,356	0.18	0
Croatian Independent Democrats	3,900	0.16	0
Croatian Workers Party	3,829	0.15	0
Democratic Party of Pensioners	3,739	0.15	0
Croatian Plans Party	3,295	0.13	0
Democratic Alliance of Greens	2,965	0.12	0
Croatian Republican Union	2,269	0.09	0
Croatian People's Peasant Party 1904	1,641	0.07	0
Croatian Republicans	1,541	0.06	0
Homeland Civic Party	1,534	0.06	0
Croatian European Party	1,201	0.05	0
Social Democratic Union of Croatia	1,113	0.04	0
Christian Social Union (Croatia)	676	0.03	0
Croatian Dalmatian Home	551	0.02	0
Democratic Action of the People of Croatia	377	0.02	0
Serb People's Party	350	0.01	0
Independent Democratic Serb Party	256	0.01	0
Party of Croatian Revival	138	0.01	0
Independents	69,746	2.81	0
National minorities			8
Total	2,478,967	100.00	152
Valid votes	2,478,967	98.37	
Invalid/blank votes	41,041	1.63	
Total votes	2,520,008	100.00	
Registered voters/turnout	4,087,553	61.65	
Source: State Election Committee, IFES

=== Minority seats ===
National minorities elected 8 representatives through a separate election system: Vojislav Stanimirović (22,2% of votes), Milorad Pupovac (21,7%) and Ratko Gajica (13,8%) for the Serb national minority, Jene Adam (42%) for the Hungarian minority, Furio Radin (79,8%) for the Italian minority, Zdenka Čuhnil (39,2%) for the Czech and Slovak minorities, Nikola Mak (14,3%) for the Austrian, Bulgarian, German, Jewish, Polish, Roma, Romanian, Rusyn, Russian, Turkish, Ukrainian, Vlach minorities and Šemso Tanković (59,1%) for the Albanian, Bosniak, Macedonian, Montenegrin and Slovene minorities.

== Aftermath ==
Ivo Sanader of the Croatian Democratic Union was appointed as prime minister by the President and confirmed by the Croatian Parliament.

The new government was formed of 13 HDZ ministers and one from the Democratic Centre.

== See also ==
- Politics of Croatia
