= Croatian Social Liberal Party =

Croatian political party

Croatian Social Liberal Party Hrvatska socijalno-liberalna stranka
- Abbreviation: HSLS
- President: Dario Hrebak
- Founder: Slavko Goldstein; Daniel Ivin
- Founded: 20 May 1989
- Headquarters: Trg Nikole Šubića Zrinskog, Zagreb
- Membership (2024): 10,958
- Ideology: Conservative liberalism; Historically: Social liberalism
- Political position: Centre to centre-right
- National affiliation: Patriotic Coalition (2015–2016); Croatian Democratic Union (coalition since 2016)
- Regional affiliation: Liberal South East European Network
- European affiliation: Alliance of Liberals and Democrats for Europe (affiliate member)
- International affiliation: Liberal International
- Colours: Yellow; Magenta; Blue
- Sabor: 2 / 151
- European Parliament: 0 / 12
- County Prefects: 0 / 21
- Mayors: 2 / 128

Website
- hsls.hr

The Croatian Social Liberal Party (Croatian: Hrvatska socijalno-liberalna stranka or HSLS) is a conservative-liberal political party in Croatia.

The HSLS were established in May 1989 in Zagreb as the first Croatian political party formed after the re-introduction of the multi-party system, at the time when SR Croatia was still part of SFR Yugoslavia.

Following Croatia's independence in 1991 the subsequent rule of the conservative Croatian Democratic Union (HDZ), the HSLS were one of the dominant forces in Croatian politics, espousing a liberal and centre-left platform. The party first won elections in 2000 and formed a coalition government with four other parties, including the major social-democrat party SDP.

The next couple of years were marked by squabbles between HSLS and SDP, with HSLS leader Dražen Budiša gradually becoming more right-wing, briefly resigning in 2001, only to come back to leave the Račan cabinet in 2002 and move back into opposition. The move led to at least two liberal factions splintering, and the HSLS turning more conservative. After losing the 2003 election, in which Budiša's HSLS shunned both the centre-left and centre-right coalitions, the party's decline in political influence started.

Between 2010 and 2015 the party was not represented in parliament. Since 2015 HSLS consistently run on tickets with the ruling HDZ. In the most recent 2024 election HSLS won two MPs in the 151-seat Sabor, as part of a wider conservative coalition.

On the European level, HSLS are one of several Croatian parties affiliated with ALDE, the main pan-European liberal political group. Since 2019 the party has been led by Dario Hrebak, who also serves as the mayor of Bjelovar, the party's only town mayor in Croatia.

== History ==
The HSLS was formed on 20 May 1989 as Croatian Social Liberal Union (Croatian: Hrvatski socijalno liberalni savez). It was the first Croatian political party formed after the reintroduction of multi-party system. As such it was part of Coalition of People's Accord during the first free elections in 1990. Its first leader was Slavko Goldstein, succeeded in 1990 by Dražen Budiša, who remained the leader until 1995. HSLS became the main opposition party after 1992 presidential and parliamentary elections and remained such until the late 1990s.

In February 1996, Vlado Gotovac became the president of the party. However, in November 1997 Budiša became the president again, and a faction led by Gotovac split off to form the Liberal Party.

In 1998, HSLS created permanent coalition with Social Democratic Party (SDP), which won elections two years later, replaced ruling Croatian Democratic Union and formed the new government together with four other parties.

However, after the party split in 2002 (the forming of LIBRA), HSLS left the government.

At the 2003 Croatian parliamentary election, an alliance of the HSLS and the Democratic Centre won 4.0% of the popular vote and 3 out of 151 seats. Two of these seats were held by the HSLS, down from 25 in 2000, causing Budiša to submit his resignation as president. After elections the HSLS supported the government of Ivo Sanader. In 2004, Ivan Čehok was elected party president.

After the 2005 Croatian local elections, it was announced that there are merger negotiations between HSLS and the Liberal Party. The latter dissolved itself, with membership and party infrastructure re-joining HSLS in January 2006. Đurđa Adlešič succeeded Ivan Čehok as the leader of reunited party.

Before the 2007 elections, HSLS, although still in government announced joint election ticket with opposition parties – Croatian Peasant Party and Alliance of Primorje-Gorski Kotar. This coalition as a whole lost five seats compared to the previous election, but HSLS retained their two seats. They remained in the governing coalition under Ivo Sanader.

HSLS continued to support the government of Jadranka Kosor until 20 July 2010, when Darinko Kosor, the leader of the Croatian Social Liberal Party, announced his party's decision to leave the governing coalition. This resulted in the party's two MPs, Ivan Čehok and Antun Korušec, resigning from the party on 14 July 2010, leaving HSLS with no members in Parliament for the first time in party's history.

In the next election in December 2011 HSLS ran in a coalition with Democratic Party of Zagorje (DPZ), a small regionalist party from northern Croatia. The coalition won only 3% of the vote and failed to make the threshold for parliament. For the next election, in November 2015, HSLS was part of the wider conservative-right-wing Patriotic Coalition led by HDZ, and managed to gain two seats in the 8th Assembly, which meant that the party returned to parliament in December 2015, after a five-year absence.

In the next three elections (2016, 2020, 2024) HSLS have been part of coalitions led by the conservative HDZ party and have supported the governments of Prime Ministers Tihomir Orešković and Andrej Plenković, without having members in their cabinets. However, the party never regained its influence from the early 2000s, and since 2003 and their turn towards more conservative positions they have never had more than two MPs in the 151-seat Sabor.

After Croatia joined the European Union in 2013 HSLS also ran in all European Parliament elections either independently or as part of various coalitions, without winning a single MEP.

== Ideology ==
In recent years by supporting Ivo Sanader, HSLS moved from social liberalism to conservative liberalism. This was considered unpopular, and the party's decline in political influence resumed.

Ahead of 2013 constitutional referendum for defining marriage as being a union between a man and a woman, HSLS urged its members and supporters to vote against proposed change.

== Election results ==
=== Legislative ===
The following is a summary of the party's results in legislative elections for the Croatian Parliament. The "Total votes" and "Percentage" columns include sums of votes won by pre-election coalitions HSLS had been part of. In elections where it became possible for the candidates of HSLS to receive preferential votes, that statistic is added to the total votes column. The "Total seats" column includes sums of seats won by HSLS in election constituencies plus representatives of ethnic minorities affiliated with HSLS.

Election	Coalition with	Votes	%	Seats	+/–	Government
Election	Coalition with	Coalition		HSLS		Government
1990	KNS	439,372	15.30	2 / 356	New	Opposition
1992	None	466,356	17.71	14 / 138	0	Opposition
1995	None	279,245	11.55	12 / 127	▼2	Opposition
2000	SDP–PGS–SBHS	1,138,318	38.70	25 / 151	▲13	Coalition
2003	DC	100,335	4.00	2 / 151	▼23	Opposition
2007	HSS–PGS	161,814	6.50	2 / 153	0	Coalition
2011	ZDS	71,077	3.00	0 / 151	▼2	Extra-parliamentary
2015	Patriotic Coalition	771,070	33.46	2 / 151	▲2	External support
2016	HDZ–HDS–HRAST	682,687	36.27	1 / 151	▼1	External support
2020	HDZ–HDS	621,008	37.26	2 / 151	▲1	External support
2024	HDZ–HNS–HDS–HSU–BM 365–HGS	729,949	34.42	2 / 151	0	Support

=== European Parliament ===
Election	List leader	Coalition	Votes	%	Seats	+/–	EP Group
Election	List leader	Coalition	Coalition		HSLS		EP Group
2013	Miroslav Rožić	HSS	28,646	3.86 (#4)	0 / 11	New	–
2014	Nikica Gabrić	NF–PGS–RI	22,098	2.40 (#6)	0 / 11	0	–
2019	Saša Poljanec-Borić	None	5,876	0.55 (#16)	0 / 12	0	–
2024	Valter Flego	Fair Play List 9 (Note: Including also IDS, NPS, SDSS, HNS, NS-R, SD, D, PGS and RI.)	41,710	5.54 (#5)	0 / 12	0	–

=== Presidential ===
The following is a list of presidential candidates who were endorsed by HSLS in elections for President of Croatia.

Election	Candidate	First round result		Second round result	
Election	Candidate	Votes	Rank	Votes	Result
1992 (Aug)	Dražen Budiša (HSLS)	22.3%	Runner-up	—	
1997 (Jun)	Vlado Gotovac (HSLS)	17.6%	Third	—	
2000 (Jan–Feb)	Dražen Budiša (HSLS)	27.8%	Runner-up	44.0%	Lost
2005 (Jan)	Đurđa Adlešič (HSLS)	2.7%	Fourth	—	
2009–10 (Dec–Jan)	Ivo Josipović (SDP)	32.4%	First	60.3%	Won
2014–15 (Dec–Jan)	Kolinda Grabar-Kitarović (HDZ)	37.2%	Runner-up	50.7%	Won
2019–20 (Dec–Jan)	Dejan Kovač (HSLS)	0.9%	Ninth	—	
2024–25 (Dec–Jan)	Dragan Primorac (Ind.)	19.6%	Runner-up	25.3%	Lost

== See also ==
- Liberalism in Croatia
