= Mreža =

Mreža ("net" in Croatian) was the first private Croatian television network. It was founded in 1997. From its Zagreb studios, it produced original programs that were later aired on various local and regional stations.

The arrival of Mreža was quite a notable event in Croatian media history, because it was the first time the media monopoly of state-owned Croatian Radiotelevision (HRT) was significantly challenged. Mreža produced original programs in the form of its own news, as well as lavishly produced shows. Mreža also poached some important talent from HRT, including Denis Latin and his popular Latinica talk show.

One of the owners of Mreža was the controversial tycoon Miroslav Kutle, and his activities caused the network to fail. Burdened with debts and financial mismanagement, Mreža disappeared from the Croatian airwaves in 1998, taking a few of the local affiliates with it, including TV Marjan from Split.
