= Miroslav Tuđman =

Croatian scientist and politician (1946–2021)

Member of the Croatian Parliament
- In office 22 December 2011 – 31 January 2021
- Constituency: I electoral district II electoral district IV electoral district

Personal details
- Born: 25 May 1946 Belgrade, PR Serbia, FPR Yugoslavia
- Died: 31 January 2021 (aged 74) Zagreb, Croatia
- Party: SDSH (1990–1992); HIP (2002–2011); HDZ (2011–2021)
- Spouse: Vanja Morić
- Parents: Franjo Tuđman (father); Ankica Tuđman (mother)
- Education: Faculty of Philosophy
- Alma mater: University of Zagreb
- Occupation: Politician, university professor
- Profession: Philosopher, information scientist

Miroslav Tuđman (Croatian pronunciation: [mǐ-, mîroslaʋ tûdʑman]; 25 May 1946 – 31 January 2021) was a Croatian scientist and politician, the son and eldest child of the first President of Croatia, Franjo Tuđman, and his wife Ankica.

== Biography ==
Tuđman was born in Belgrade, where he completed grade school, before he moved with his family to Zagreb in 1961. He was born on his parents' 1st anniversary. He was named Miroslav after the famous writer Miroslav Krleža who was adored by his father at that period. He graduated from gymnasium and then from the Faculty of Philosophy at the University of Zagreb in 1970. He became part of the faculty and received a doctorate in information sciences at the same university in 1985. In 1989 he founded the Institute for Information Studies at the Faculty.

He participated in the Croatian War of Independence in 1991, and in 1992 he became the head of the Center for Strategic Research. Later he was the deputy head of the National Security Office and then the founder and leader of the first Croatian Intelligence Agency (Croatian: Hrvatska izvještajna služba; HIS) between 1993 and 1998, and then from 1999 to 2000. In 1995, President Tuđman decorated him with the Order of Duke Domagoj, for war-time merit as a member of the political administration of the Ministry of Defence. In 1998, he became a tenured professor at the Faculty of Philosophy.

His first venture into politics was as a co-founding member of the briefly active leftist Social Democrats of Croatia (SDSH) together with his friend Antun Vujić in 1990, but he soon switched to his father's party – the conservative Croatian Democratic Union (HDZ). However, he was largely politically inactive during the 1990s. Following his father's death and HDZ's first election defeat in 2000, he ran for the Zagreb Assembly as an independent candidate in the 2001 local elections, winning 7.6% of the vote.

That same year he and Nenad Ivanković founded a fringe right-wing party Croatian True Revival (HIP), which later cooperated with Croatian Bloc (HB) led by Ivić Pašalić–another HDZ offshoot–but they gained no traction at the 2003 parliamentary election. In 2009 he was a nominally independent candidate in the presidential election, finishing seventh in the first round with 4.09% of the vote.

He later re-joined HDZ and in 2011 won a seat in the parliamentary election on an HDZ ticket in the 7th assembly. He retained his seat in the following three elections in 2015 (8th assembly), 2016 (9th assembly) and 2020 (10th assembly).

Tuđman died on 31 January 2021, at Zagreb's Hospital for Infectious Diseases where he had been hospitalized days earlier due to COVID-19 complications amidst the COVID-19 pandemic in Croatia.
