= Ivan Pernar =

Ivan Pernar may refer to:

- Ivan Pernar (politician, born 1889), Croatian politician of the Croatian Peasant Party
- Ivan Pernar (politician, born 1985), Croatian politician of the Human Shield political party
