= 2019–20 Croatian presidential election =

- 22 December 2019 (first round); 5 January 2020 (second round)
- Turnout: 51.18% (first round), 54.99% (second round)
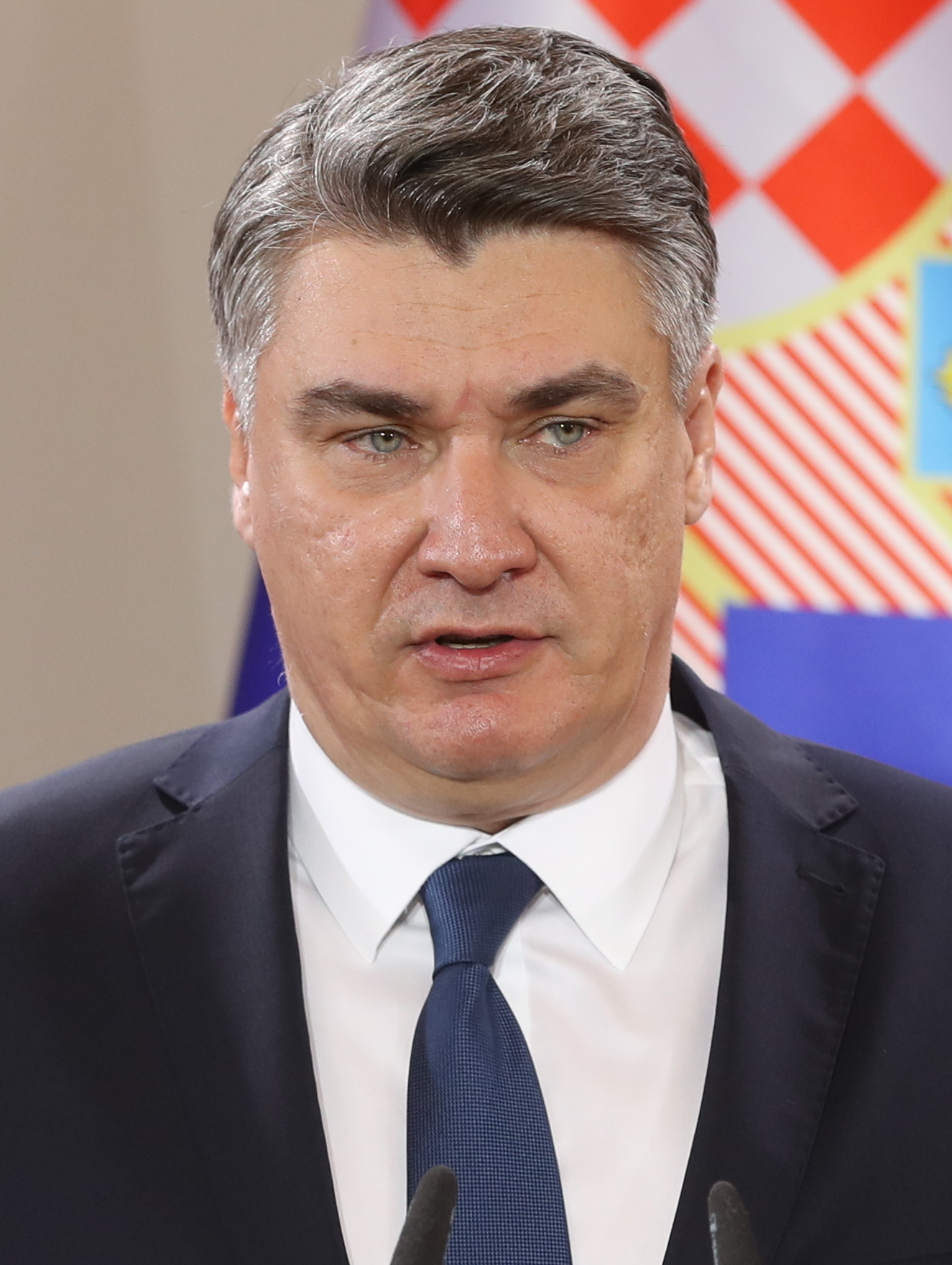

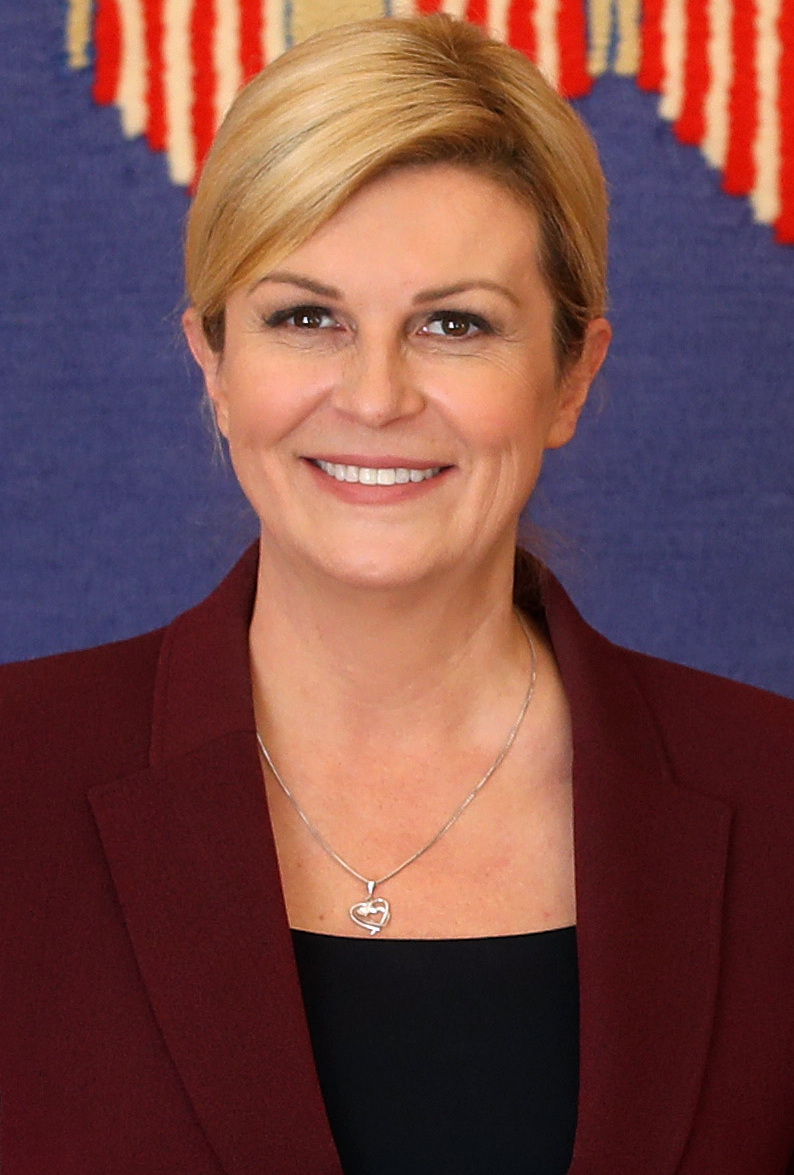
Nominee	Zoran Milanović	Kolinda Grabar-Kitarović
Party	SDP	Independent (HDZ) (Note: Grabar-Kitarović was elected in the 2014–2015 election as the candidate of the HDZ. However, under Article 96 of the Constitution of Croatia, sitting presidents are prohibited from holding party memberships for the duration of their term. As a result, she stood as an independent candidate, albeit with informal HDZ affiliation.)
Popular vote	1,034,170	929,707
Percentage	52.66%	47.34%
President before election
Kolinda Grabar-Kitarović
Independent
Elected President
Zoran Milanović
Social Democratic Party

Presidential elections were held in Croatia in December 2019 and January 2020. The decision to call the elections was made by the Croatian Government during its session on 14 November 2019. Potential candidates were required to gather at least 10,000 signatures from Croatian citizens who have reached the age of 18 in order for their candidacy to become official and for their name to appear on the ballot. They were allocated a time frame of twelve days to accomplish this and thus had until midnight local time on 3 December 2019 to present their signatures to the State Electoral Commission. A total of twelve candidates submitted signatures by the deadline and the commission then proceeded to verify the signatures within the following 48 hours, presenting a final list of eleven approved candidates on 5 December 2019.

In the first round of the election, which was held on 22 December 2019, former prime minister Zoran Milanović finished in first place with 30% of the vote. He was followed closely by incumbent president Kolinda Grabar-Kitarović, who received 27% of the vote and by Miroslav Škoro with 25%. As no candidate received an absolute majority, a run-off took place on 5 January 2020 between Milanović and Grabar-Kitarović. Milanović won the second round with 53% of the vote and was elected the fifth president of Croatia since independence in 1991, while Grabar-Kitarović became the second consecutive president not to have been reelected for a second term, after Ivo Josipović (2010–2015). The number of votes received by Milanović in both the first and the second round was the lowest of any victorious presidential candidate to date, while the number of votes and vote share of Grabar-Kitarović in the first round was the lowest for any incumbent president running for re-election.

== Background ==
The incumbent president of Croatia, Kolinda Grabar-Kitarović, took office on 19 February 2015 and her term is due to end on 18 February 2020. The presidential term of Zoran Milanović is due to begin on 19 February 2020 and end on 18 February 2025.

== Electoral system ==
The president of Croatia is directly elected by secret ballot to a term of 5 years using a two-round system. The Constitution of Croatia requires that a presidential election be held no sooner than 60 days and no later than 30 days before the expiration of the incumbent president's term. An absolute majority (50% + 1 vote) of all votes cast (including invalid, blank and uncast ballots) is required to win in the first round. If no candidate acquires such a majority, a second-round is to be held in 14 days' time, with the two candidates with the highest number of votes in the first round taking part. The candidate who acquires the highest number of votes in the second round (a majority of valid cast votes) is declared the winner. If one of the candidates who has won a high enough number of votes to take part in the second round were to abandon his candidacy or die, the candidate with the next highest number of votes in the first round will earn the right to take part in the second round. Furthermore, Croatian presidents may serve a maximum of two 5-year terms in their lifetime (a total of 10 years if both terms are won and served out in full).

In order for a potential candidate to be legally allowed to contest the election and have their name placed on the ballot, they must gather at least 10,000 signatures from eligible voters, with every such signatory being permitted to give his signature of support to only one potential candidate. The time frame for collecting the said number of signatures is set at 12 days, and after the expiry of this period potential candidates must submit them to the State Electoral Commission for verification.

== Candidates ==
On 5 December, the State Electoral Commission published a list of 11 candidates.

Candidate	Party affiliation	Political remarks	Proof of nomination
Nedjeljko Babić	Croatian Party of all Chakavians, Kajkavians and Shtokavians	The candidate of a regional party, the Croatian Party of all Chakavians, Kajkavians and Shtokavians (HSSČKŠ). His bid was announced on 26 September.	Submitted some 14,000 signatures on 30 November.
Anto Đapić	Democratic Alliance for National Renewal	Đapić is nominated as the candidate of a right-wing party, the Democratic Alliance for National Renewal (DESNO). His bid was announced on 18 September. Declared himself the only true hard-right candidate. Formerly an MP (1992–2009) and the Mayor of Osijek (2005–2007, 2009), previously ran in the 2000 election as the candidate of the Croatian Party of Rights, finishing in 5th place in the first round.	Submitted some 13,000 signatures on 2 December.
Kolinda Grabar-Kitarović (runner-up)	Independent	Incumbent President of Croatia since 2015. Grabar-Kitarović is standing for re-election to a second and final term. Although formally independent, she was nominated by the ruling Croatian Democratic Union and is supported by three other centrist to right-wing parties (HSP AS, BM 365, and HDS). She is running on a centre-right platform. Her bid was announced on 8 August.	Submitted some 231,000 signatures on 3 December.
Dario Juričan (legal name is Milan Bandić)	Independent	Filmmaker born as Dario Juričan. In 2019, he legally changed his name to that which is identical to the name of the incumbent Mayor of Zagreb, Milan Bandić. His bid was announced on 18 September and is running on an anti-Milan Bandić satirical platform.	Submitted some 13,000 signatures on 3 December.
Mislav Kolakušić	Independent	Former judge and independent Member of the European Parliament for Croatia. His bid was announced on 27 May. He is running as an anti-establishment independent candidate, focusing on anti-corruption and smaller government policies.	Submitted some 15,000 signatures on 29 November.
Dejan Kovač	Croatian Social Liberal Party	An economist at the Princeton University. Kovač is a candidate of the centre to centre-right Croatian Social Liberal Party (HSLS), although he is not their member. His bid was announced on 4 August.	Submitted some 16,000 signatures on 1 December.
Zoran Milanović (winner)	Social Democratic Party	Candidate of the biggest opposition party, the centre-left Social Democratic Party (SDP), and is supported by 12 other centre-left, green and liberal parties (HSS, HSU, PGS, NS-R, Democrats, IDS, HL, SU, Glas, MDS, SNAGA, ZS, ORaH). His bid was announced on 17 June. Former Prime Minister of Croatia (2011–2016) and the president of SDP (2007–2016).	Submitted some 78,000 signatures on 26 November.
Dalija Orešković	Independent	Orešković was nominated as an independent candidate, although she leads the Party of Anti-corruption, Development and Transparency (START). Her bid was announced on 7 July 2019. In 2018, she had initially publicly stated that she wouldn't run in the election. She is running on an anti-corruption platform. Former Chair of Conflicts of Interest Committee of the Croatian Parliament (2013–2018).	Submitted some 11,000 signatures on 3 December.
Katarina Peović	Workers' Front	Peović was nominated by her own party, the left-wing Workers' Front, and is supported by the Socialist Labour Party. Running on a democratic socialist platform. Her bid was announced on 18 December 2018. Formerly a member of the Zagreb Assembly (2018).	Submitted some 14,000 signatures on 3 December.
Ivan Pernar	Party of Ivan Pernar	At the time a member of the Croatian Parliament. Pernar was nominated by his own party, which bears his name. Running on a populist platform. He announced his intention to run on 7 June 2019 and officially launched a candidacy on 21 June 2019.	Submitted some 15,000 signatures on 3 December.
Miroslav Škoro	Independent	Popular folk musician and formerly a member of the Croatian Parliament (2008). Running as an independent candidate, supported by right-wing and anti-establishment parties. His bid is endorsed by HKS, Hrast, UHD, Most, Green List and was announced on 23 June.	Submitted some 70,000 signatures on 3 December.

=== Withdrawn bids ===
- Vlaho Orepić withdrew on 2 December. He had initially scheduled the submission of his signatures of endorsement to the State Electoral Commission for 3 December 2019, however after having managed to collect only 8,054 signatures by the evening of 2 December, he determined that he would be unlikely to reach the required quota of 10,000 signatures by the set deadline and he thus withdrew his candidacy. He is a member of the Croatian Parliament (2017–) and the former Minister of the Interior (2016–2017). He had announced his bid on 11 July.
- Tomislav Panenić withdrew on 3 December. He is a current member of the Croatian Parliament (2016–) and the former Minister of Economy (2016). His had announced his bid on 26 June.
- Ante Simonić withdrew on 3 December. He is a former Deputy Prime Minister of Croatia, having served in the Second Račan cabinet. He had announced his bid on 14 July.

=== Failed candidacies ===
These individuals failed to submit the required number of endorsement signatures.

- Slobodan Midžić, a perennial potential candidate who submitted just one signature of endorsement to the State Electoral Commission on 3 December 2019. He had previously unsuccessfully attempted to become an official candidate in the 2009 and the 2014 elections.
- Josip Juretić, an activist. His bid was announced on 7 September.
- Ivan Rude, a lawyer from Šibenik. His bid was announced on 16 September.
- Ava Karabatić, a TV personality, singer, and model from Zadar. Her bid was announced on 30 September. Subsequently, she endorsed Zoran Milanović.
- David Lucijan Rožman, a student. His bid was announced on 1 October.
- Antun Babić, a former deputy chief of mission-minister plenipotentiary in the Croatian embassy in Ireland. His bid was announced on 14 February 2019
- Goran Jurišić, a member of HSP 1861. His bid was announced on 3 January 2019.
- Marko Vučetić, a member of the Croatian Parliament (2016 onwards). His bid was announced on 14 November 2018.
- Ante Pavlović, controversial charismatic Croatian self-proclaimed chiropractor and martial arts expert.

=== Declined candidacies ===
These individuals have been the subject of presidential speculation, but have publicly denied or recanted interest in running for president.

- Ivo Josipović, Member of the Croatian Parliament (2003–2010), President of Croatia (2010–2015), and a SDP member. Zoran Milanović ultimately became the SDP's candidate.
- Predrag Matić, MEP (2019 onwards), Minister of Veterans' Affairs (2011–2015), member of the Croatian Parliament (2015–2019), and an SDP member. Zoran Milanović ultimately became the SDP's candidate.
- Tonino Picula, MEP (2013 onwards), Minister of Foreign Affairs (2000–2003), and an SDP member. Zoran Milanović ultimately became the SDP's candidate.
- Krešo Beljak, President of the HSS and a member of the Croatian Parliament (2016 onwards). HSS ultimately endorsed the SDP's candidate, Zoran Milanović.
- Anka Mrak-Taritaš, President of the Glas and a member of the Croatian Parliament (2016 onwards), Minister of Construction and Spatial Planning (2012–2015). Glas ultimately endorsed the SDP's candidate, Zoran Milanović.
- Božo Petrov, President of the Most, Member of the Croatian Parliament (2015 onwards), Deputy Prime Minister of Croatia (2016), Speaker of the Croatian Parliament (2016–2017). Most ultimately endorsed independent candidate Miroslav Škoro.
- Ruža Tomašić, MEP (2013 onwards), Member of the Croatian Parliament (2003–2007, 2011–2013), and a HKS member. HKS ultimately endorsed independent candidate Miroslav Škoro.
- Milan Bandić, Mayor of Zagreb (2000–2002, 2005 onwards) and the president of BM 365 (2015 onwards). Bandić ultimately endorsed independent candidate Kolinda Grabar-Kitarović.
- Dejan Jović, Chief Political Analyst and Special Coordinator in the Office of the President of Croatia (2010–2014). Considered a possible candidate for the Independent Democratic Serb Party (SDSS).

== Campaign ==
=== First round ===
==== Endorsements ====
Kolinda Grabar-Kitarović
- Croatian Democratic Union (HDZ)
- Croatian People's Party (HNS)
- Bandić Milan 365 - Labour and Solidarity Party (BM 365)
- Croatian Party of Rights Dr. Ante Starčević (HSP AS)
- Croatian Christian Democratic Party (HDS)
- Ljubo Ćesić Rojs, retired army general
- Josip Jurčević, historian
- Zdravko Tomac, publicist and former politician
- Zdravko Mamić, former Croatian football administrator and sports agent
- Miroslav Blažević, former football manager
- Lino Červar, professional handball coach and former politician
- Oliver Mlakar, TV host
- Igor Vori, former professional handball player
Mislav Kolakušić
- Human Shield (ŽZ)
- Youth Action (AM)
- Let's Change Croatia (PH)
Zoran Milanović
- Social Democratic Party of Croatia (SDP)
- Croatian Peasant Party (HSS)
- Croatian Party of Pensioners (HSU)
- Alliance of Primorje-Gorski Kotar (PGS)
- People's Party - Reformists (NS-R)
- Democrats (D)
- Istrian Democratic Assembly (IDS)
- Croatian Labourists – Labour Party (HL)
- Party of Pensioners (SU)
- Civic Liberal Alliance (Glas)
- Međimurje Democratic Assembly (MDS)
- POWER - People's and Civic Engagement Party (SNAGA)
- Green Party – Green Alternative (ZS)
- Sustainable Development of Croatia (ORaH)
- Vlatka Pokos, jet setter, former singer and former television host.
- Ava Karabatić, a starlet, singer, and model from Zadar.
- Branimir Glavaš, retired army general. (support rejected by Milanović)
Katarina Peović
- Workers' Front (RF)
- Socialist Labour Party (SRP)
- New Left (NL)
- Ljiljana Nikolovska, singer
- Ivica Prtenjača, author
- Nadežda Čačinovič, philosopher, professor University of Zagreb
- Aleksandar "Saša" Kabiljo, composer
- Tomislav Jakić, journalist, former adviser to the 2nd Croatian president Stjepan Mesić
- Drago Plečko, author, parapsychologist
- Ines Prica, anthropologist at Institute of Ethnology and Folklore Research
- Zoran Restović, president of the Association of the Anti-Fascist Fighters of Šibenik-Knin County
- Sead Lipovača, guitarist and the founder of Divlje Jagode
- Krešimir Sučević Međeral, researcher at Institute for Croatian Language and Linguistics and a TV personality (chaser at the Croatian version of the game show The Chase)
- Alen Marin, musician, lead singer of Kojoti
- Boris Cerovec, leader of the Jadranski Sindikat trade union
- Boris Kuk, designer
- Borivoj Radaković, author
- Ankica Čakardić, Marxist-feminist philosopher, assistant professor at Zagreb University
- Boris Postnikov, essayist and literary critic
- Velimir Visković, literary critic and lexicographer
- Franci Blašković, musician
- Marina Banićević, film director
- Davor Jurkotić, comedian and TV host
- Mario Lipovšek Battifiaca, musician, comedian and TV host
- Rada Borić, feminist activist, linguist, member of the Zagreb Assembly
- Siniša Miličić, leader of the Regional Industrial Trade Union
- Viktor Ivančić, publicist and journalist, founder of Feral Tribune
- Vlado Bulić, writer and actor
- Hrvoje Rupčić, musician, founder of Cubismo
- Nemanja Cvijanović, multimedia artist
- Slaven Tolj, multimedia artist
- Dražen Turina Šajeta, musician
- Slavin Balen, radio host and DJ at Radio 101
Miroslav Škoro
- Croatian Souverainists, politician alliance including:
  - Croatian Conservative Party (HKS)
  - Croatian Growth (Hrast)
  - Bloc for Croatia
  - United Croatian Patriots
  - The Truth About the Istanbul Convention
  - Croatian Rampart
  - Association of the Families of Deceased Croatian War Veterans
  - Association of the Widows of Croatian War Veterans
- Bridge of Independent Lists (Most)
- Green list (ZL)
- Independent list Bura (NLB)
- Jacques Houdek, singer
- Vedran Mlikota, actor
- Željko Pervan, comedian
- Ruža Tomašić, Croatian MEP
- Velimir Bujanec, right-wing television pundit
- Božidar Alić, actor
- Anica Kovač, model
- Antonija Šola, actress and singer
- Ivan Aralica, academician, novelist and essayist
- Nada Gačešić-Livaković, actress
- Željko Glasnović, retired major general and right-wing politician
- Zlatko Hasanbegović, right-wing politician and former Minister of Culture
- Marko Ljubić, journalist
- Davor Domazet-Lošo, publicist and retired admiral of the Croatian Navy
- Ana Lederer, theatrologist and former intendant of Croatian National Theatre in Zagreb
- Tomislav Sunić, far-right activist and professor
- Stjepan Tuđman, politician and son of the first Croatian president Franjo Tuđman
- Vlatka Vukelić, historian, activist and assistant professor at Zagreb University
- Karlo Starčević, politician and president of * Croatian Party of Rights (HSP)

==== Debates ====
After official validation of candidates by the State Electoral Commission, the first debate was a confrontation between Katarina Peović (RF and SRP) and Anto Đapić (Democratic Alliance for National Renewal), the most left-wing and the most-right wing candidate respectively, which was filmed by and broadcast on N1 television on 5 December 2019.

On 17 December, the Croatian Radiotelevision held the general debate with all 11 candidates participated. It was the only debate where all first-round candidates participated.

=== Second round ===
==== Endorsements ====
Zoran Milanović
- Independent Democratic Serb Party (SDSS)
- Croatian Party of all Chakavians, Kajkavians and Shtokavians
- Stipe Mesić, second President of Croatia
- Ivo Josipović, third President of Croatia
- Lista za Rijeku - Lista per Fiume
- Milorad Pupovac, president of Independent Democratic Serb Party (SDSS)
Kolinda Grabar-Kitarović
- Croatian Social Liberal Party (HSLS)
- Julienne Bušić, American writer, activist, widow and co-conspirator of Zvonko Bušić
- Damir Bićanić, handball player
- Anto Đapić, first round candidate
- Ivan Aralica, novelist, former Member of Croatian Parliament
- Vladimir Paar, physicist, university professor at Zagreb University
- Tomislav Josić, right-wing political activist, president of the Headquarters for the Defence of Croatian Vukovar
- Slavko Goluža, former handball player
- Matija Prskalo, actress
- Željko Krznarić, physician, professor at Zagreb University
- Marijana Petir, former Member of the European Parliament and former Member of Croatian Parliament (HDZ), endorsed Miroslav Škoro in the first round
- Stipe Božić, mountaineer and film-maker
- Ivan Gudelj, former footballer
- Vesna Bosanac, war time Director of General Hospital in Vukovar
- Marko Perkovic Thompson, singer
- Mate Bulić, singer
- Zlatko Dalić, football manager, selector of Croatia national football team
- Dubravko Šimenc, former water polo player
- Zvonko Ćurković, former commander of paramilitary Croatian Defence Forces, Vukovar
- Ivan Velić, Bosnian and Croatian basketball coach and former player
- Marin Rozić, basketball player, Cibona
- Božidar Alić, actor, endorsed Miroslav Škoro in the first round
- Slavko Linić, former member of Cabinet of Zoran Milanović

==== Debates ====
On 30 December, RTL held the first general debate with two second round candidates participated. Croatian Radiotelevision held the second debate on 2 January 2020. The third and final general debate was held on Nova TV on 3 January.

== Opinion polls ==
=== First round ===
Polls conducted after the official start of the campaign

Date	Polling Firm	Grabar-Kitarović	Milanović	Škoro	Kolakušić	Juričan	Orešković	Pernar	Peović	Kovač	Đapić	Babić	Undecided / none	Lead
22 Dec 2019	Exit poll	25,63	28,69	24,26	6,23	4,77	3,39	2,78	1,11	1,07	0,37	0,45	-	3,06
20 Dec 2019	IPSOS PULS	24,2	24,3	18,0	5,5	3,3	2,8	3,4	1,4	2,3	1,1	0,0	13,6	0,1
20 Dec 2019	Promocija plus	27,9	26,7	19,3	6,8	1,8	2,9	3,1	0,9	2,2	0,4	0,2	7,7	1,2
19 Dec 2019	Promocija plus	28,3	26,6	20,7	7,6	1,5	2,4	2,8	0,9	2,6	0,4	0,4	5,9	1,7
19 Dec 2019	2x1 komunikacije	25,3	26,0	23,8	6,1	1,3	1,0	1,2	1,1	0,9	1,2	0,4	11,7	0,7
11 Dec 2019	2x1 komunikacije	24,1	25,2	22,5	10,6	1,2	1,4	2,5	0,9	1,1	1,8	0,2	8,5	1,1
10 Dec 2019	Promocija plus	26,8	25,4	21,0	10,6	0,9	2,6	1,9	0,9	1,5	0,4	0,3	7,9	1,4
7 Dec 2019	2x1 komunikacije	26,0	29,0	21,9	11,0	-	-	-	-	-	-	-	-	3,0
6 Dec 2019	IPSOS PULS	27,4	24,0	23,0	8,2	1,2	1,3	2,9	0,2	2,6	0,2	0,5	8,0	3,4

Polls conducted before the official start of the campaign

Date	Polling Firm	Grabar- Kitarović	Milanović	Škoro	Kolakušić	Pernar	Orešković	Panenić	Peović	Bandić	Esih	Sinčić	Petrov	Vučetić	Jurišić	Mesić	Mrak- Taritaš	Others	Don't know	Lead
25 Nov 2019	IPSOS PULS	32,4	21,9	17,3	7,4	3,0	3,1	-	-	-	-	-	-	-	-	-	-	3,3	7,9	10,5
20 Nov 2019	Promocija plus	28,9	26,4	17,6	12,1	2,1	2,3	-	-	-	-	-	-	-	-	-	-	1,8	5,0	2,5
17 Nov 2019	2x1 komunikacije	27,7	25,1	20,5	9,3	1,2	-	-	-	-	-	-	-	-	-	-	-	-	13,4	2,6
11 Nov 2019	Promocija plus	28,6	24,3	16,7	14,0	1,3	2,5	-	0,3	-	-	-	-	-	-	-	-	1,0	6,1	4,3
28 Oct 2019	2x1 komunikacije	27,1	27,6	21,0	5,9	-	-	-	-	-	-	-	-	-	-	-	-	-	13,2	0,5
26 Oct 2019	IPSOS PULS	34,5	24,9	18,3	5,1	4,0	2,9	-	-	-	-	-	-	-	-	-	-	4,6	4,1	9,6
20 Oct 2019	Promocija plus	29,8	25,8	19,1	7,1	1,9	2,6	-	-	-	-	-	-	-	-	-	-	1,9	6,7	4,0
7 Oct 2019	Promocija plus	29,8	25,6	19,1	6,4	1,6	1,9	-	0,6	-	-	-	-	-	-	-	-	2,0	6,2	4,2
1 Oct 2019	David Lucijan Rožman (Ind.) officially announces his candidacy.																			
30 Sep 2019	Ava Karabatić (Ind.) officially announces her candidacy.																			
26 Sep 2019	Nedjeljko Babić (HSSČKŠ) officially announces his candidacy.																			
25 Sep 2019	IPSOS PULS	34,3	23,9	20,2	6,2	3,7	3,3	-	-	-	-	-	-	-	-	-	-	4,4	2,2	10,4
21 Sep 2019	Promocija plus	28,5	24,8	18,2	8,6	2,7	2,6	0,5	0,5	-	-	-	-	-	-	-	-	1,9	7,1	3,7
20 Sep 2019	2x1 komunikacije	29,2	28,5	17,5	4,6	1,3	-	-	-	-	-	-	-	-	-	-	-	-	14,8	0,7
18 Sep 2019	Anto Đapić (DESNO) officially announces his candidacy.																			
18 Sep 2019	Dario Juričan (Ind.) officially announces his candidacy.																			
16 Sep 2019	Ivan Rude (Ind.) officially announces his candidacy.																			
9 Sep 2019	Promocija plus	30,2	25,5	19,2	9,3	2,0	2,3	0,7	0,7	-	-	-	-	-	-	-	-	1,5	4,6	4,7
7 Sep 2019	Josip Juretić (Ind.) officially announces his candidacy.																			
24 Aug 2019	2x1 komunikacije	25,7	25,9	20,9	7,4	2,5	0,9	-	0,1	-	-	-	-	-	-	-	-	-	15,2	0,2
23 Aug 2019	IPSOS PULS	34,6	24,6	18,0	6,4	3,9	3,4	-	-	-	-	-	-	-	-	-	-	4,4	4,7	10,0
8 Aug 2019	Kolinda Grabar-Kitarović (HDZ) officially announces her candidacy.																			
5 Aug 2019	Promocija plus	29,3	24,8	18,5	12,0	3,0	1,4	0,5	0,9	-	-	-	-	-	-	-	-	2,0	7,6	4,5
4 Aug 2019	Dejan Kovač (HSLS) officially announces his candidacy.																			
26 Jul 2019	IPSOS PULS	32,8	23,4	19,9	7,1	4,5	-	-	-	-	-	-	-	-	-	-	-	7,4	4,9	9,4
15 Jul 2019	2x1 komunikacije	28,1	23,6	20,9	6,2	2,3	1,1	0,6	0,3	-	-	-	-	-	-	-	-	-	17,0	4,5
14 Jul 2019	Ante Simonić (Ind.) officially announces his candidacy.																			
11 Jul 2019	Vlaho Orepić (Ind.) officially announces his candidacy.																			
8 Jul 2019	Promocija plus	30,0	22,3	17,8	13,9	2,8	-	1,5	2,1	-	-	-	-	-	-	-	-	2,4	7,2	7,7
7 Jul 2019	Dalija Orešković (Ind.) officially announces her candidacy.																			
28 Jun 2019	IPSOS PULS	37,1	31,0	19,5	6,4	3,1												2,8		6,1
27 Jun 2019	Tomislav Panenić (Ind.) officially announces his candidacy.																			
23 Jun 2019	Miroslav Škoro (Ind.) officially announces his candidacy.																			
21 Jun 2019	Ivan Pernar (SIP) officially announces his candidacy.																			
18 Jun 2019	2x1 komunikacije	32,0	22,0	10,3	10,2	0,7	2,6			0,8					0,2				21,6	10,0
17 Jun 2019	Zoran Milanović (SDP) officially announces his candidacy.																			
10 Jun 2019	Promocija plus	34,5	19,8	13,8	13,1							1,9	3,3					3,3	10,9	14,7
27 May 2019	Mislav Kolakušić (Ind.) officially announces his candidacy.																			
21 May 2019	Promocija plus	34,7	18,5	9,4			6,7					6,0					4,0	3,7	9,2	16,2
9 May 2019	Promocija plus	35,3	15,4				9,9			3,5	2,8	7,5	3,2					3,7	8,4	19,9
22 Apr 2019	Promocija plus	35,6	18,3		4,9		9,5			3,5	3,3	5,2	3,7					2,1	8,9	17,3
8 Apr 2019	Promocija plus	34,5	16,4				10,7			4,4		5,7	4,2			3,3			5,9	18,1
22 Mar 2019	Promocija plus	34,2	19,4		5,2		9,2			3,9		6,3	4,0					1,9	5,3	14,8
7 Mar 2019	Promocija plus	32,6	19,7				12,5			4,2		4,9	4,4	0,9						12,9
14 Feb 2019	Antun Babić (Ind.) officially announces his candidacy.																			
7 Feb 2019	Promocija plus	37,0	19,6				12,3			4,5	3,9	4,5	4,2	1,2					4,4	17,4
10 Jan 2019	Promocija plus	38,0	17,6				12,0			4,5	4,1	7,9	6,2	1,7						20,4
03 Jan 2019	Goran Jurišić (HSP 1861) officially announces his candidacy.																			
18 Dec 2018	Katarina Peović (RF) officially announces her candidacy.																			
7 Dec 2018	Promocija plus	41,1	18,1				11,2			4,2		8,9	5,3							23
14 Nov 2018	Marko Vučetić (Ind.) officially announces his candidacy.																			
25 Apr 2018	2x1 komunikacije	45,8	20,5								1,4	15,7	11,7							25,3
16 Mar 2018	2x1 komunikacije	46,4	26,5									12,2	11,4							19,9
3 Feb 2018	Promocija plus	43,5	22,0									11,9	6,6					5,9	10,1	21,5
17-18 Jan 2018	IPSOS PULS	41,0	21,0									15,0	12,0					5,0	6,0	20,0

=== Second round ===
Polls conducted after the first round

Date	Agency	Milanović	Grabar- Kitarović	Undecided/ Neither	Lead
5 Jan 2020	Exit poll	53,22	46,78	-	6,44
3 Jan 2020	IPSOS PULS	45	42	13	3
3 Jan 2020	2x1 komunikacije	50,7	49,3	N/A	1,4
31 Dec 2019	2x1 komunikacije	40,0	38,9	21,2	1,1
24 Dec 2019	IPSOS PULS	48,4	41,1	10,4	7,3

Hypothetical polling

Polls conducted after the official start of the campaign

Date	Polling Firm	Grabar-Kitarović	Milanović	Undecided	Lead	Grabar-Kitarović	Škoro	Undecided	Lead	Milanović	Škoro	Undecided	Lead
20 Dec 2019	IPSOS PULS	43,1	40,9	5,0	2,2	38,2	36,2	5,8	2,0	37,5	47,0	4,9	9,5
20 Dec 2019	Promocija plus	49,0	45,9	5,1	3,1	45,9	46,6	7,5	0,7	45,9	47,5	6,6	1,6
19 Dec 2019	Promocija plus	49,0	46,9	4,1	2,1	45,1	48,7	6,2	3,6	44,6	50,2	5,2	6,4
10 Dec 2019	Promocija plus	48,3	47,6	4,1	0,7	45,2	50,0	4,8	4,8	43,5	52,9	3,6	9,4
6 Dec 2019	IPSOS PULS	44,2	39,2	5,8	5,0	34,4	45,2	5,7	10,8	36,9	47,1	5,7	12,2

Opinion polls

Date	Polling Firm	Grabar- Kitarović	Milanović	Undecided	Lead	Grabar- Kitarović	Škoro	Undecided	Lead	Milanović	Škoro	Undecided	Lead	Grabar- Kitarović	Orešković	Undecided	Lead
25 Nov 2019	IPSOS PULS	53,2	33,3	4,8	19,9	44,6	37,9	6,1	6,7	35,3	47,7	5,7	12,4	-	-	-	-
21 Nov 2019	Promocija plus	49,2	46,1	4,7	3,2	46,7	44,1	9,2	2,6	46,0	49,8	4,3	3,8	-	-	-	-
11 Nov 2019	Promocija plus	51,8	44,5	3,7	7,3	49,2	45,6	5,1	3,6	46,3	49,6	4,1	3,3	-	-	-	-
26 Oct 2019	IPSOS PULS	51,3	37,9	4,2	13,4	45,4	38,2	5,0	7,2	38,8	48,6	3,6	9,8	-	-	-	-
21 Oct 2019	Promocija plus	49,0	44,1	6,9	4,9	49,4	44,0	6,6	5,4	46,2	49,5	4,4	3,3	-	-	-	-
7 Oct 2019	Promocija plus	50,8	44,9	4,3	5,9	48,4	42,3	9,2	6,1	45,8	49,8	4,4	4,0	-	-	-	-
25 Sep 2019	IPSOS PULS	51,5	36,0	5,2	15,5	45,8	36,8	6,0	9,0	38,2	47,8	5,0	9,6	-	-	-	-
22 Sep 2019	Promocija plus	52,3	43,2	4,5	9,1	49,2	41,6	9,2	7,6	45,4	49,4	5,2	4,0	-	-	-	-
9 Sep 2019	Promocija plus	52,7	42,8	4,5	9,9	51,3	41,4	7,3	9,9	45,1	49,7	5,2	4,6	-	-	-	-
23 Aug 2019	IPSOS PULS	51,1	36,6	5,1	14,5	46,1	36,5	5,9	9,6	38,9	46,9	4,9	8,0	-	-	-	-
5 Aug 2019	Promocija plus	53,1	42,4	4,5	10,7	50,0	44,9	5,1	5,1	46,5	47,9	5,6	1,4	-	-	-	-
26 Jul 2019	IPSOS PULS	53,0	37,2	4,3	15,8	46,1	37,7	5,1	8,4	38,7	48,6	5,8	9,9	-	-	-	-
8 Jul 2019	Promocija plus	53,9	41,7	4,4	12,2	53,9	38,1	8,0	15,8	44,4	51,6	4,0	7,2	-	-	-	-
28 Jun 2019	IPSOS PULS	56,1	35,9	3,8	20,2	50,2	35,5	5,1	14,7	41,1	48,6	3,8	7,5	-	-	-	-
10 June 2019	Promocija plus	54,8	38,9	6,3	15,9	57,0	35,4	7,6	21,6	-	-	-	-	-	-	-	-
21 May 2019	Promocija plus	53,9	39,2	6,9	14,7	-	-	-	-	-	-	-	-	-	-	-	-
9 May 2019	Promocija plus	56,5	37,2	6,3	19,3	-	-	-	-	-	-	-	-	54,3	39,4	6,2	14,9
22 Apr 2019	Promocija plus	53,2	40,3	6,5	12,9	-	-	-	-	-	-	-	-	-	-	-	-
8 Apr 2019	Promocija plus	55,4	38,6	6,0	16,8	-	-	-	-	-	-	-	-	51,8	41,6	6,6	10,2
22 Mar 2019	Promocija plus	52,6	38,8	8,5	13,8												
7 Mar 2019	Promocija plus	52,9	40,8	6,3	12,1												
7 Feb 2019	Promocija plus	54,3	40,2	5,5	14,1												
10 Jan 2019	Promocija plus	54,6	37,9	7,5	16,7												
7 Dec 2018	Promocija plus	55,4	35,7	9,0	19,7												

== Results ==
The first round of the election took place on 22 December 2019, with former Social Democratic Prime Minister Zoran Milanović winning by a plurality of 29.55% of the vote, ahead of conservative incumbent President Kolinda Grabar-Kitarović, who received 26.65% of the vote. The conservative folk musician and former Member of Parliament Miroslav Škoro, who was running as an independent candidate, narrowly failed to reach the run-off election, managing to attract the support of 24.45% of voters. This marked the first time in Croatian history that the incumbent president did not receive the highest number of votes in the first round. Also, Grabar-Kitarović attained both the lowest number of votes (507,626) and the lowest percentage of votes of any Croatian president competing in either of the two rounds of elections. Milanović received both the lowest number of votes (562,779) and the lowest percentage of the vote of any first-place candidate in the first round of a presidential election. Škoro received the highest number of votes (465,703) for a third-placed candidate since Mate Granić (HDZ) in the 2000 elections and the highest-ever percentage of the vote for a candidate who did not advance to the run-off. Milanović received a plurality of the vote in Croatia's three largest cities; 33.02% in Zagreb, 30.79% in Split and 41.87% in Rijeka, and finished second (25.61%) in the fourth largest city, Osijek, which was won by Škoro (33.33%). Grabar-Kitarović came in second in Split and Rijeka, and third in Zagreb and Osijek.

A run-off was held between Milanović and Grabar-Kitarović on 5 January 2020. Milanović won by just over 104,000 votes, becoming the fifth President of Croatia since independence and the second to have been officially nominated by the Social Democratic Party, after Ivo Josipović (2010–2015). Furthermore, Milanović received a majority of the vote in seven counties and in the City of Zagreb, while Grabar-Kitarović defeated him among voters living in thirteen counties and among the members of the Croatian diaspora. However, Milanović defeated Grabar-Kitarović in all four major cities: Zagreb (by around 74,000 votes), Split (by around 3,000 votes), Rijeka (by around 20,000 votes) and Osijek (by around 1,000 votes).

Candidate	Party	First round		Second round	
Candidate	Party	Votes	%	Votes	%
Zoran Milanović	Social Democratic Party	562,783	29.91	1,034,170	52.66
Kolinda Grabar-Kitarović	Independent (Croatian Democratic Union)	507,628	26.98	929,707	47.34
Miroslav Škoro	Independent	465,704	24.75		
Mislav Kolakušić	Independent	111,916	5.95		
Dario Juričan	Independent	87,883	4.67		
Dalija Orešković	Independent	55,163	2.93		
Ivan Pernar	Party of Ivan Pernar	44,057	2.34		
Katarina Peović	Workers' Front	21,387	1.14		
Dejan Kovač	Croatian Social Liberal Party	18,107	0.96		
Anto Đapić	Democratic Alliance for National Renewal	4,001	0.21		
Nedjeljko Babić	HSSČKŠ	3,014	0.16		
Total		1,881,643	100.00	1,963,877	100.00
Valid votes		1,881,643	98.83	1,963,877	95.65
Invalid/blank votes		22,218	1.17	89,415	4.35
Total votes		1,903,861	100.00	2,053,292	100.00
Registered voters/turnout		3,719,741	51.18	3,734,115	54.99
Source: Izbori

=== By county ===
==== First round ====
County	Electorate	Total votes	Turnout	Babić		Đapić		Grabar-Kitarović		Juričan		Kovač		Milanović		Kolakušić		Orešković		Peović		Pernar		Škoro	
County	Electorate	Total votes	Turnout	Votes	%	Votes	%	Votes	%	Votes	%	Votes	%	Votes	%	Votes	%	Votes	%	Votes	%	Votes	%	Votes	%
Bjelovar-Bilogora	96,483	48,448	50.21%	64	0.13	74	0.15	12,863	26.54	1,159	2.39	903	1.86	13,272	27.39	2,812	5.80	1,078	2.22	391	0.80	1,203	2.48	14,180	29.26
Brod-Posavina	133,397	65,175	48.86%	35	0.05	147	0.22	19,863	30.47	1,438	2.20	500	0.76	13,374	20.51	3,985	6.11	1,075	1.64	385	0.59	1,704	2.61	21,805	33.45
Dubrovnik-Neretva	107,631	55,176	51.26%	54	0.09	137	0.24	20,237	36.83	2,219	4.02	376	0.68	14,232	25.78	2,687	4.86	1,206	2.18	458	0.82	1,205	2.18	11,320	20.51
Istria	185,670	88,014	47.40%	147	0.16	111	0.12	10,693	12.14	4,577	5.19	1,013	1.15	45,145	51.28	6,081	6.90	4,563	5.18	2,573	2.92	3,707	4.21	8,259	9.38
Karlovac	107,618	57,511	53.44%	70	0.12	133	0.23	19,283	33.52	1,584	2.75	393	0.68	16,249	28.25	2,616	4.54	1,418	2.46	465	0.80	1,153	2.00	13,498	23.46
Koprivnica-Križevci	93,108	46,627	50.08%	65	0.13	78	0.16	12,307	26.39	1,439	3.08	481	1.03	14,593	31.29	2,872	6.15	1,311	2.81	364	0.78	1,304	2.79	11,341	24.32
Krapina-Zagorje	108,400	54,777	50.53%	656	1.19	67	0.12	14,698	26.82	1,860	3.39	469	0.85	19,482	35.56	3,556	6.49	1,667	3.04	370	0.67	1,652	3.01	9,638	17.59
Lika-Senj	42,849	21,017	49.05%	30	0.14	74	0.35	9,102	43.30	399	1.89	129	0.61	4,403	20.94	869	4.13	451	2.14	143	0.68	323	1.53	4,830	22.97
Međimurje	95,840	48,227	50.32%	97	0.20	51	0.10	8,347	17.30	1,579	3.27	612	1.26	22,066	45.75	3,620	7.50	1,820	3.77	409	0.84	1,770	3.66	7,460	15.46
Osijek-Baranja	249,085	127,069	51.01%	85	0.06	491	0.38	33,980	26.73	3,460	2.72	901	0.70	27,710	21.80	7,272	5.72	2,642	2.07	1,030	0.81	2,808	2.20	45,266	35.61
Požega-Slavonia	64,044	35,754	55.83%	21	0.05	45	0.12	10,877	30.41	673	1.88	224	0.62	6,974	19.50	1,865	5.21	542	1.51	204	0.57	777	2.17	13,137	36.73
Primorje-Gorski Kotar	261,760	125,606	47.99%	208	0.16	252	0.20	27,964	22.25	6,402	5.09	1,341	1.06	49,193	39.15	8,808	7.01	6,745	5.36	2,784	2.21	3,198	2.54	17,310	13.77
Sisak-Moslavina	141,335	67,191	47.54%	80	0.11	132	0.19	20,423	30.39	1,945	2.89	732	1.08	17,790	26.47	3,531	5.25	1,358	2.02	515	0.76	1,600	2.38	18,278	27.19
Split-Dalmatia	404,750	198,359	49.01%	155	0.07	558	0.28	64,221	32.36	9,636	4.85	1,316	0.66	48,953	24.67	10,475	5.27	4,000	2.01	2,029	1.02	3,753	1.89	50,338	25.36
Šibenik-Knin	97,235	43,709	44.95%	45	0.10	133	0.30	15,746	36.01	1,675	3.83	305	0.69	11,156	25.51	2,397	5.48	908	2.07	393	0.89	947	2.16	9,387	21.47
Varaždin	145,506	75,626	51.97%	143	0.18	103	0.13	16,694	22.07	2,470	3.26	721	0.95	28,506	37.69	6,377	8.43	2,437	3.22	666	0.88	2,425	3.20	14,261	18.79
Virovitica-Podravina	69,520	38,129	54.85%	30	0.07	76	0.19	12,446	32.63	689	1.80	310	0.81	8,661	22.71	1,899	4.97	661	1.73	186	0.48	878	2.30	11,882	31.15
Vukovar-Syrmia	146,958	68,671	46.73%	62	0.09	171	0.24	20,849	30.35	1,412	2.05	965	1.40	13,159	19.15	3,342	4.86	1,048	1.52	589	0.85	1,609	2.34	24,566	35.76
Zadar	160,257	71,587	44.67%	100	0.13	190	0.26	26,341	36.79	2,845	3.97	560	0.78	17,780	24.83	3,666	5.12	1,963	2.74	663	0.92	1,591	2.22	14,881	20.78
Zagreb County	273,405	144,738	52.94%	288	0.19	261	0.18	34,854	24.07	6,937	4.79	1,400	0.96	41,579	28.72	9,792	6.76	4,452	3.07	1,146	0.79	3,636	2.51	38,870	26.84
City of Zagreb	693,899	381,668	55.00%	566	0.14	612	0.16	73,958	19.36	33,145	8.67	4,377	1.14	126,142	33.02	22,688	5.93	13,616	3.56	5,413	1.41	6,323	1.65	90,890	23.79
Voting abroad	—N/a	40,774	—N/a	13	0.03	105	0.25	21,790	53.43	339	0.83	79	0.19	2,360	5.78	706	1.73	202	0.49	211	0.51	491	1.20	14,351	35.18
TOTAL	3,719,532	1,903,853	51.19%	3,014	0.15	4,001	0.21	507,626	26.65	87,882	4.61	18,107	0.95	562,779	29.55	111,916	5.87	55,163	2.89	21,387	1.12	44,057	2.31	465,703	24.45
Source: Izbori

==== Second round ====
County	Electorate	Total votes	Turnout	Milanović		Grabar-Kitarović	
County	Electorate	Total votes	Turnout	Votes	%	Votes	%
Bjelovar-Bilogora	96,509	51,452	53.32%	25,398	51.6	23,820	48.4
Brod-Posavina	133,461	66,387	49.74%	26,657	42.4	36,230	57.6
Dubrovnik-Neretva	107,714	58,465	54.29%	24,219	43.5	31,477	56.5
Istria	185,675	98,089	52.81%	76,946	80.8	18,247	19.2
Karlovac	107,840	63,224	58.64%	28,397	46.7	32,386	53.3
Koprivnica-Križevci	93,167	50,096	53.78%	27,076	56.4	20,904	43.6
Krapina-Zagorje	108,452	61,958	57.13%	35,936	60.1	23,821	39.9
Lika-Senj	42,867	23,306	54.37%	8,167	36.2	14,374	63.8
Međimurje	95,914	54,666	57.00%	39,574	74.4	13,601	25.6
Osijek-Baranja	249,283	129,349	51.90%	56,428	45.8	66,577	54.1
Požega-Slavonia	64,093	35,556	55.48%	14,412	43.2	18,995	56.8
Primorje-Gorski Kotar	261,902	135,820	51.88%	84,856	64.9	45,831	35.1
Sisak-Moslavina	141,362	73,367	51.91%	32,937	47.0	37,174	53.0
Split-Dalmatia	405,173	219,897	54.29%	87,503	41.8	121,975	58.2
Šibenik-Knin	97,305	50,451	51.86%	20,753	42.8	27,864	57.2
Varaždin	145,596	84,174	57.82%	54,024	66.6	27,042	33.4
Virovitica-Podravina	69,548	38,839	55.85%	17,432	47.1	19,548	52.9
Vukovar-Syrmia	146,989	70,371	47.88%	26,722	40.1	39,984	59.9
Zadar	160,441	81,460	50.78%	33,622	43.1	44,471	56.9
Zagreb County	273,722	153,231	56.09%	79,499	54.5	66,349	45.5
City of Zagreb	694,639	400,763	57.73%	227,609	59.7	153,687	40.3
Voting abroad	—N/a	52,373	—N/a	6,222	12.1	45,311	87.9
TOTAL	3,734,115	2,053,292	55.00%	1,034,389	52.7	929,488	47.3
Source: Izbori

=== Maps ===
==== First round ====
First-place candidate in the first round of the election in each municipality.

First round results by municipality, shaded according to winning candidate's percentage of the vote.

First round results by settlement, shaded according to winning candidate's percentage of the vote.

==== Second round ====
First-place candidate in the 2nd round of the election in each municipality.

2nd round results by municipality, shaded according to winning candidate's percentage of the vote.

=== Voter demographics ===
Ipsos Puls exit polls for the first round of the election suggested the following demographic breakdown:

First round demographic breakdown
Demographic	Milanović	Grabar-Kitarović	Škoro
Total vote	29.6	26.7	24.5
Gender
Male	27.2	24.7	26.5
Female	30.3	24.4	23.2
Age
18–29	15.8	18.2	31.9
30–44	24.8	20.3	24.2
45–59	28.3	26.7	25.7
60+	40.5	29.6	19.8
Education
Primary	21.4	40.1	26.9
Secondary	28.4	24.3	27.2
College degree	31.8	19.9	20
Political party
HDZ	3.1	63	26.8
SDP	77.2	1.8	6.4
Most	9.4	5.6	45.4
ŽZ	8.5	1.5	24.9
BM 365	12.5	18.1	36.5
Other parties	12	5.8	38.8

== See also ==
- 2020s in political history
- List of presidents of Croatia

== Notes ==
1. Grabar-Kitarović was elected to office as the official candidate of the Croatian Democratic Union (HDZ) in the 2014–2015 election, but is legally prohibited by Article 96 of the Constitution from holding any party membership for the entire duration of her term. Thus, although not a member of a political party, she has been nominated by the Croatian Democratic Union and three other parties to be their candidate in the 2019–2020 election.
