= Nenad Ivanković =

Croatian author, journalist and politician

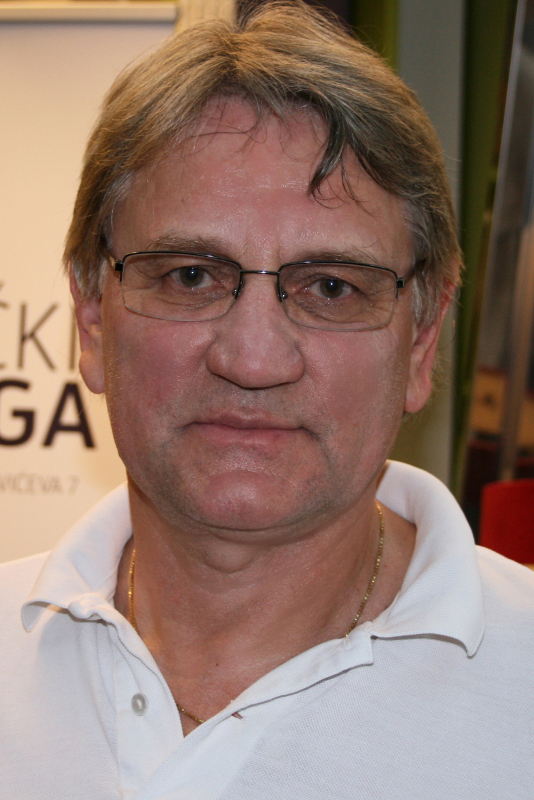
- At the Zagreb Book Fair, 2011
- Born: March 18, 1948 (age 78); Zagreb, SR Croatia, SFR Yugoslavia
- Education: Faculty of Humanities, Zagreb (B.A., Philosophy and Comparative Literature)
- Occupations: writer, journalist, politician
- Spouse: Snježana Kodarić Ivanković
- Writing career
- Genres: biography, philosophy, essay

Nenad Ivanković (born March 18, 1948) is a Croatian author, journalist and politician. He is best known for his biographies of President Franjo Tuđman and General Ante Gotovina. Ivanković founded Samostalnost i napredak, a Eurosceptic party, and co-founded Croatian True Revival, a right-wing party.

== Life and career ==
Ivanković was born in Zagreb. He graduated from the Faculty of Humanities and Social Sciences, with a BA in Philosophy and Comparative Literature, and got his MA from the Faculty of Political Science in 1980.

He became a journalist in the Vjesnik consortium, where he worked as an editor and columnist in the daily Vjesnik and the weekly Danas. In 1988, Ivanković went to Bonn to report for Vjesnik, Večernji list and Croatian Radiotelevision. He was the co-founder of the German-Croatian Society with the seat in Bonn. After working as the minister counselor in the first Croatian embassy in Bonn in 1992, he went back to reporting until 1996. For his contributions to the development of the relationships between Croatia and Germany, he was awarded the greatest German decoration, Order of Merit, by the German president Roman Herzog in 1994. A year later, he was chosen as the journalist of the year by the Croatian Journalist Society for his articles about NATO. The Croatian president Franjo Tuđman awarded him the Order of Danica Hrvatska in 1995.

In spring 1996, Ivanković became editor-in-chief of Vjesnik, host of the TV show Pressklub and editor of Croatia Weekly. In 2000, he resigned as editor-in-chief of Vjesnik and went into politics. Together with Miroslav Tuđman and others, he founded Croatian True Revival (HIP), a right wing political party that won five seats in the Zagreb City Assembly in 2001. After leading the HIP Representatives Club till late 2003, he left the party and founded the Eurosceptic party Samostalnost i napredak [Independence and Progress] (SIN) as its first president. The party had a nine-month campaign called Cheese and Cream.

He wrote several books of non-fiction, including the bestsellers Predsjedniče, što je ostalo?, a psychological and political portrait of Franjo Tuđman, and Ratnik, a biography of General Ante Gotovina, which has been translated into English as The Warrior.

Ivanković founded HONOS, the association for the protection of Homeland War and boxing club Šaka. He was the director of the Croatian Nordic team and two-time world journalist champion in Nordic walking (in 1988 and 2000).

He lives and works in Zagreb.

== Bibliography ==
- Bonn, druga hrvatska fronta (Bonn, the Second Croatian Front)
- Hrvatska od okupacije do regionalne sile (Croatia, from Occupation to Regional Power)
- Predsjedniče, što je ostalo? (Mr. President, What Is Left?)
- Ratnik (The Warrior)
- Mesiću i Račane, zašto tako? (Mesić and Račan, Why So?)
- Krvava zemlja (The Bloody Land)
- Sova (The Owl)
- U potrazi za vedrinom (Looking for Serenity)
- Što smo mu učinili? (What Have We Done To Him?)
- Ona (She)
- Obična pisma neobičnim ljudima (Ordinary Letters to Extraordinary People)
- Što je zapravo EU (What the EU Really Is)
- Bandić / Zoon politikon
