= Croatian Bloc =

Croatian Bloc may refer to:

- Croatian Bloc (coalition), a coalition of political parties active in the first half of the 20th century in the Kingdom of Yugoslavia
- Croatian Bloc (political party), a short-lived political party which was active in Croatia from 2002 to 2009
