= Latinica =

Latinica may refer to:

- Gaj's Latin alphabet (Croatian and Bosnian: Gajeva latinica, Serbian: Гајева латиница)
- Latinica (talk show), a Croatian political television talk show broadcast on HRT 1 between 1993–2011
