= 2001 Zagreb local elections =

Local elections in Croatia

- 21 May 2001

All 51 seats to the Zagreb Assembly 26 seats needed for a majority
- Turnout: 39.79% ▲6.09 pp
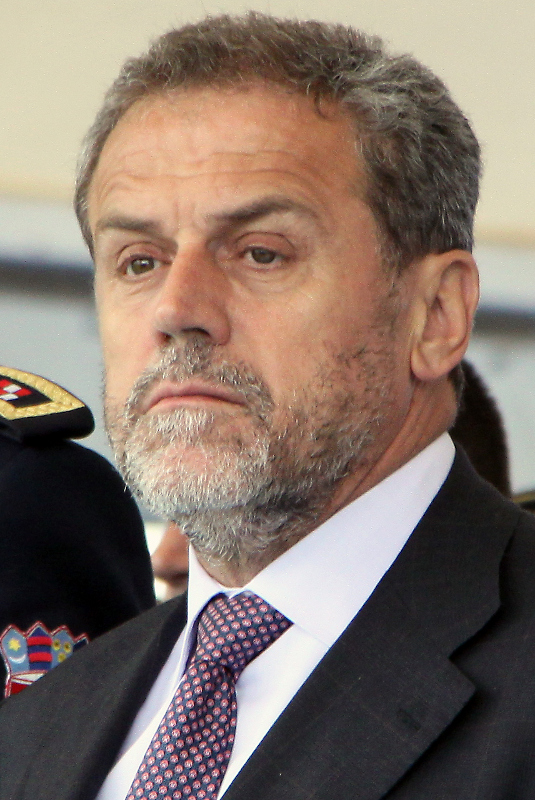

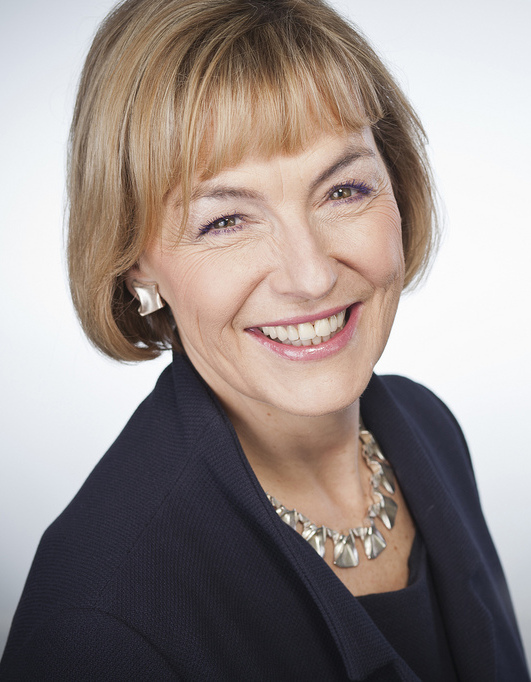
	First party	Second party
Candidate	Milan Bandić	Davorin Tepeš
Party	SDP	HDZ–HSP–HKDU
Seats won	20 / 51	14 / 51
Seat change	▲5	▲9
Popular vote	73,560	54,100
Percentage	27.07%	19.91%
Swing	▲6.09 pp	▲8.31 pp
	Third party	Fourth party
Candidate	Vesna Pusić	Miroslav Tuđman
Party	HNS	Independent
Seats won	12 / 51	5 / 51
Seat change	▲3	New
Popular vote	47,667	20,761
Percentage	17.54%	7.64%
Swing	▼1.46 pp	New
Mayor before election
Milan Bandić
SDP
Elected mayor
Milan Bandić
SDP

Elections were held in Zagreb on 21 May 2001 for members of the Zagreb Assembly. Milan Bandić, the incumbent mayor since 2000, led the list of the Social Democratic Party of Croatia (SDP), the largest centre-left party in the country and at the time a member of the governing coalition of Croatia.

Out of 29 lists that participated in the elections, only four passed the electoral threshold. The SDP won 20 seats in the Assembly and formed a coalition with the Croatian People's Party (HNS), which won 12 seats. The centre-right Croatian Democratic Union (HDZ) coalition came second with 14 seats, while an independent list of Miroslav Tuđman won five. Milan Bandić was re-elected mayor by the Zagreb Assembly on 20 June.

== Results ==
=== Assembly election ===
Parties and coalitions	Popular vote			Seats	
Parties and coalitions	Votes	%	±pp	Total	+/−
Social Democratic Party of Croatia (SDP)	73,560	27.07%	+6.09	20	+5
Croatian Democratic Union (HDZ); Croatian Party of Rights (HSP); Croatian Christian Democratic Union (HKDU)	54,100	19.91%	+8.31	14	+9
Croatian People's Party (HNS)	47,667	17.54%	–1.46	12	+3
Independent list of Miroslav Tuđman	20,761	7.64%	New	5	New
Croatian Peasant Party (HSS)	11,289	4.16%	+1.9	0	–2
Croatian Social Liberal Party (HSLS)	8,820	3.25%	–11.56	0	–10
Croatian Party of Pensioners (HSU)	8,392	3.09%	Coalition	0	±0
Other lists	47,105	17.34%		0	
Total:	271,694			51	
Invalid votes:	4,550	1.65%			
Turnout:	276,359	39.79%	+6.09		
Registered voters:	694,586				
Source: City Election Committee

Popular vote
SDP	27.07%
HDZ coalition	19.91%
HNS	17.54%
NL Miroslav Tuđman	7.64%
HSS	4.16%
HSLS	3.25%
HSU	3.09%
Other	17.34%

Seat totals
SDP	39.22%
HDZ coalition	27.45%
HNS	23.53%
NL Miroslav Tuđman	9.84%

== See also ==
- List of mayors of Zagreb
