= Party of Ivan Pernar =

Party of Ivan Pernar Stranka Ivana Pernara
- President: Santino Matušin
- Vice President: Ivan Strnak
- Founded: 7 July 2019
- Dissolved: 22 May 2025
- Split from: Human Shield
- Ideology: Euroscepticism; Right-wing populism; Anti-immigration; Russophilia
- Political position: Right-wing
- Colors: Blue
- Sabor: 0 / 151
- European Parliament: 0 / 12
- County Prefects: 0 / 21
- Mayors: 0 / 128

Party of Ivan Pernar (Croatian: Stranka Ivana Pernara or SIP) was a political party in Croatia, formed on 7 July 2019 by former members of the political party Human Shield. It was named after its leader, Ivan Pernar.

== History ==
Pernar was elected as the party's President during the party's inaugural conference in the village of Kašina by receiving 148 votes from party delegates. Branimir Bunjac received 57 votes and was elected as the party's vice president.

During the conference, eight different names were proposed for the party, which chose to name itself after its leader with a three-quarters supermajority.

Prior to 9 October 2019, the party was organized by General-secretary Ivan Despetović, who subsequently left the party as he felt it had strayed away from his roots and into what he described as "cheap populism".

On 22 May 2025, the party officially went bankrupt and was set to be removed from the official Register of Political Parties.

== Ideology ==
=== Economics and tax ===
SIP has declared itself to be in opposition to the privatization and concession of resources and enterprises it deems to be of public importance. It also declared that it sought a reduction in value-added tax (VAT) and opposed property taxes. It opposed the introduction of the Euro as Croatia's currency.

=== Foreign policy ===
The party was firmly opposed to Croatia's membership of the European Union and NATO, as it saw Croatian membership in both organizations as incompatible with sovereignty. It instead proposed that Croatia should be militarily neutral.

The party opposed the sanctions against Russia and had instead declared its support for "de-escalation of conflicts".

It supported the recognition of the State of Palestine as an independent and sovereign state and called on Israel to withdraw from Palestinian territories.

=== Social, civil and environmental issues ===
The party has expressed support for freedom of religion, explicitly including the rights of atheists. It supported the legalization of cannabis and some support for LGBT rights, while opposing mandatory vaccination.

It has declared an opposition to the use of 5G telecommunications, which it deems would increase the amount of "unnecessary radiation" to which Croatians are exposed. Instead it supported the expansion of fiber-optic communication as a means of increasing internet speeds. The party held a protest in Osijek against the introduction of a 5G telecom network in the town.

The party opposeed nuclear power.

=== Immigration ===
The party strongly opposeed illegal immigration and has expressed support for the construction of a physical border barrier along the parts of the border affected by illegal immigration, as well as involving the Croatian Army in border patrols.

== Election results ==
=== Legislative ===
Election	Coalition	Votes	%	Seats	+/–	Government
Election	Coalition	Coalition totals		SIP only		Government
2020	Živi Zid–NLSP–PH–HSS SR–HSSČKŠ–ZSZ–AM	37,628	2.26%	0 / 151	New	Extra-parliamentary
2024	None	19,367	0.91%	0 / 151	0	Extra-parliamentary

=== European Parliament ===
Election	List leader	Coalition	Votes	%	Seats	+/–	EP Group
Election	List leader	Coalition	Coalition		SIP		EP Group
2024	Ivan Pernar	None	2,280	0.30 (#14)	0 / 12	New	–

=== President of Croatia ===
The following is a list of presidential candidates endorsed by the SIP in elections for President of Croatia.

Election year	Candidate	First round			Second round		
Election year	Candidate	# of overall votes	% of overall votes	Position	# of overall votes	% of overall votes	Position
2019	Ivan Pernar	44,053	2.31%	7th	—N/a		
