= Denis Latin =

Croatian television host

Denis Latin (born 14 February 1966) is a Croatian television host.

Born in Šibenik, he began to work on HRT in 1987 and two years later, in 1989, he graduated from Faculty of Political Science in Zagreb. In 1990 he became the announcer of Dnevnik, the daily news program on HRT, and with the age of 24 was the youngest person ever to announce this program. In 1993 he started to host his own talk show Latinica that ran on private network Mreža, but is now aired on national television HRT. More than 300 episodes so far have been broadcast.
