= Latinica (talk show) =

Croatian television talk show

Latinica is a Croatian television talk show launched on November 11, 1993, which was broadcast on Mondays at 20:10 CET on HRT 1. Hosted by Denis Latin, it discussed current events with guest experts and also contained five outside reports showing the actual cases connected with current discussion. Its title, besides being derived from the host Latin's surname, literally means "Latin alphabet" in Croatian.

Latinica was the longest-running weekly talk show in Croatian television, with more than 350 broadcasts. The show was canceled on January 13, 2011, and the final show was broadcast on January 17, 2011.

== Overview ==
Latinica started on HRT, but was briefly shown on Mreža, the first private Croatian TV network, in 1997 and 1998, owned by Miroslav Kutle and other businessmen close to the government. In late 2005, it was speculated that the show would be transferred to another private network, Nova TV.

In 2005, Latinica became the subject of controversy when the show dealt with the legacy of Franjo Tuđman. The treatment of the late president provoked a debate in the parliament and was criticised by his followers, most notably Andrija Hebrang and other high-ranking members of the ruling Croatian Democratic Union party. Hebrang went as far as to accuse the show of causing the death of a Patriotic War veteran who committed suicide after allegedly being upset with the show's contents in this episode.

When the veteran's daughter, a young HRT reporter, disputed the story, Hebrang attributed that to HRT management pressure and tried to use this as an argument for Parliament's (and his party's) tighter controls of the media. Latin, vilified by right-wing sections of the Croatian public, had to endure several weeks without his show on the air, with his sacking seen as a done deal, but HRT leadership in the end decided to keep Latinica on the air.
