= Vjesnik =

Croatian daily newspaper (1940-2012)

Coordinates: 45°47′37″N 15°57′35″E

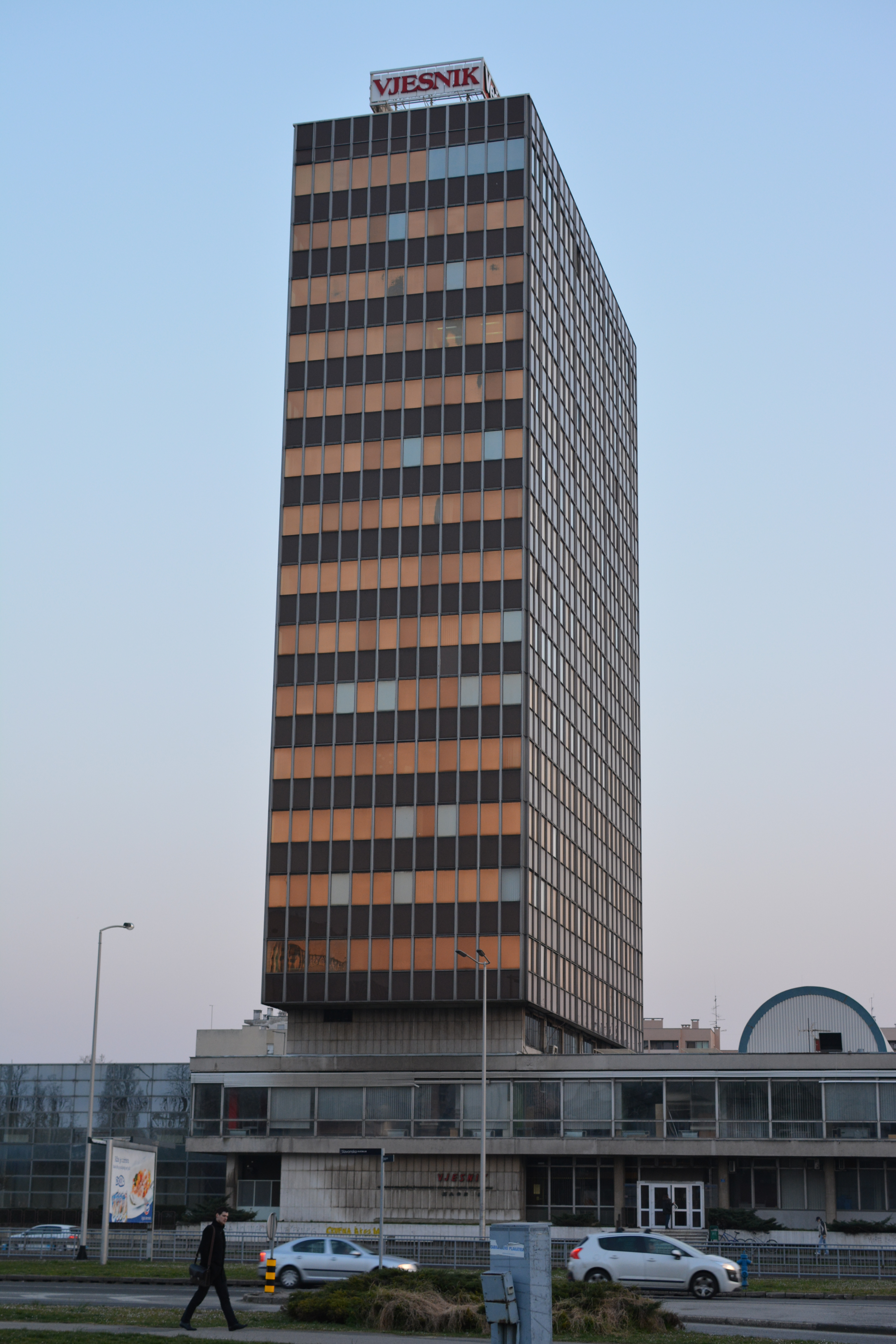
- The Vjesnik building in Zagreb prior to its fire and demolition, 2015
- Type: Daily newspaper
- Format: Berliner
- Founder: Communist Party of Yugoslavia
- Publisher: Vjesnik d.d. (1946–2008); Narodne novine d.d. (2008–2010); Tiskara Vjesnik (2010–2012)
- Founded: 24 June 1940
- Ceased publication: 20 April 2012 (print); July 2012 (online)
- Language: Croatian
- Headquarters: Slavonska avenija 4, Trnje, Zagreb, Croatia
- ISSN: 0350-3305
- Website: www.vjesnik.hr

Vjesnik (lit. 'courier') was a Croatian state-owned daily newspaper published in Zagreb. Originally established in 1940 as a wartime illegal publication of the Communist Party of Croatia, it later built and maintained a reputation as Croatia's newspaper of record during most of its post-war history. It ceased publication in April 2012.

After the war, the Vjesnik building was used by other media companies and newspapers as well as the Croatian Ministry of Construction. On November 17th 2025, a fire broke out on the 15th floor and spread across the whole building, destroying most of its interior and heavily damaging the exterior.

The building, which was built in 1974 was completely demolished in June 2026.

== History ==
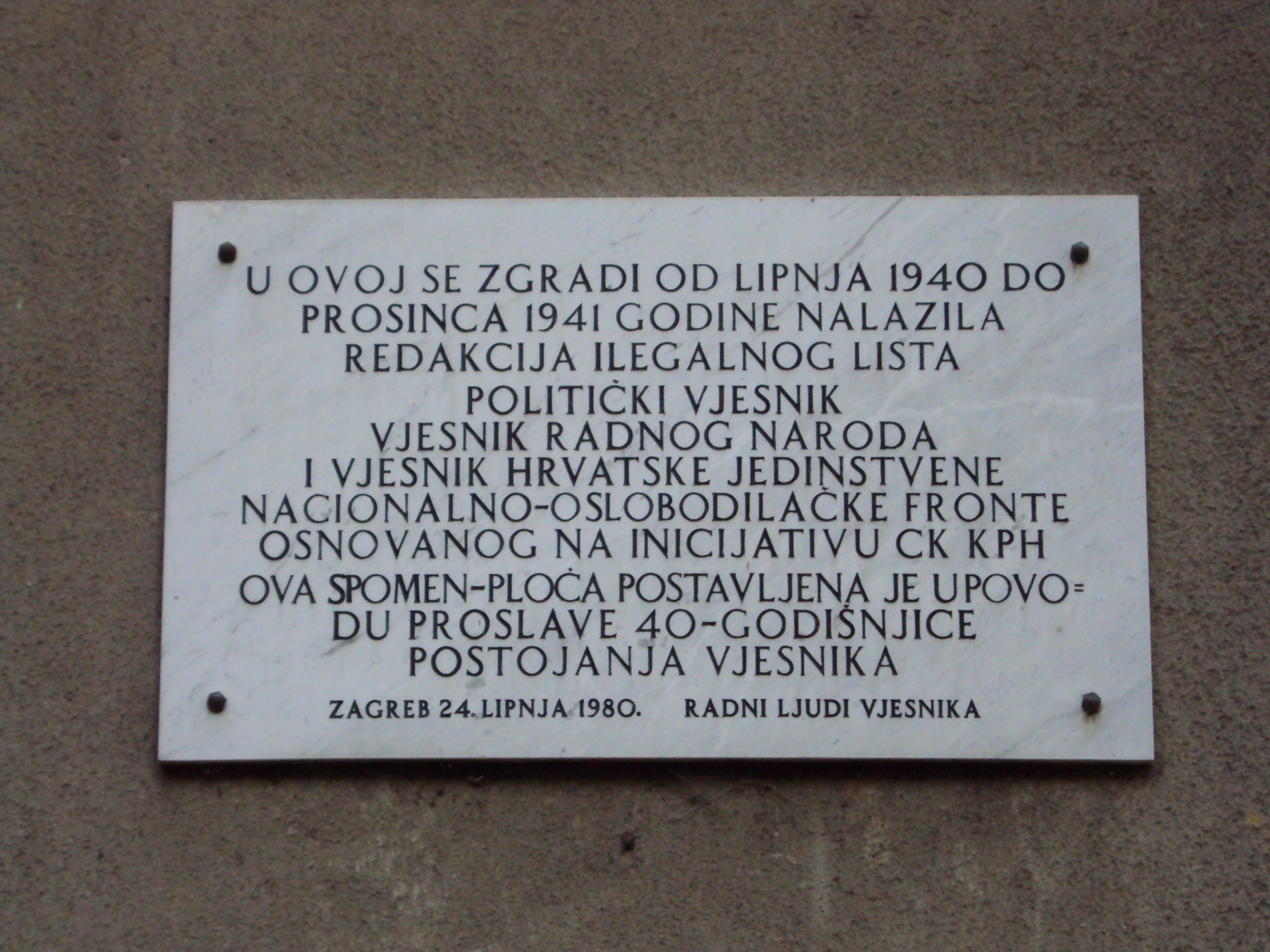
Memorial plaque on the building that hosted illegal redaction of newspaper "Vjesnik" in Zagreb from June 1940 to December 1941

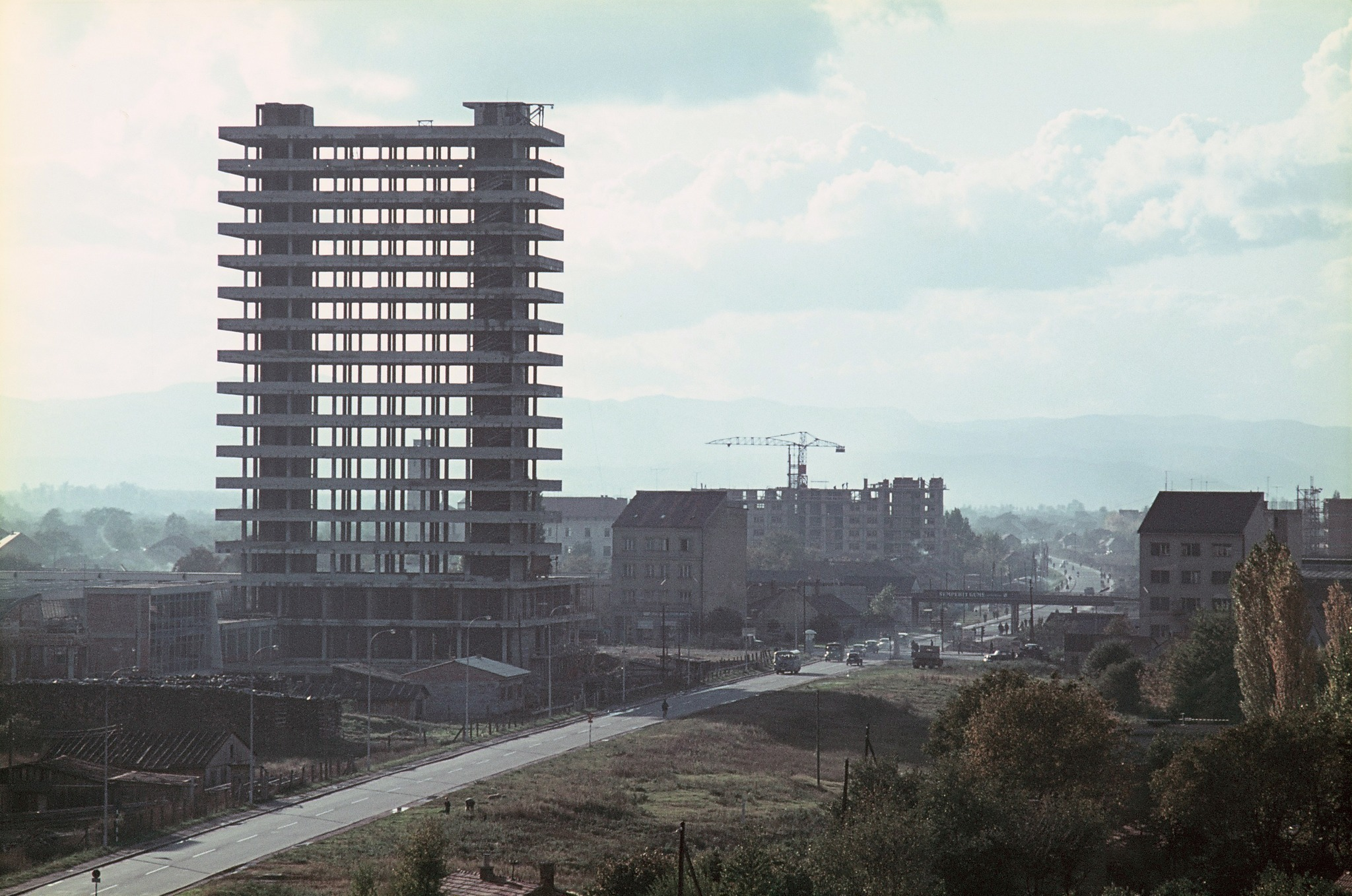
Construction of the Vjesnik Building in the 60s, with Slavonska Avenue.

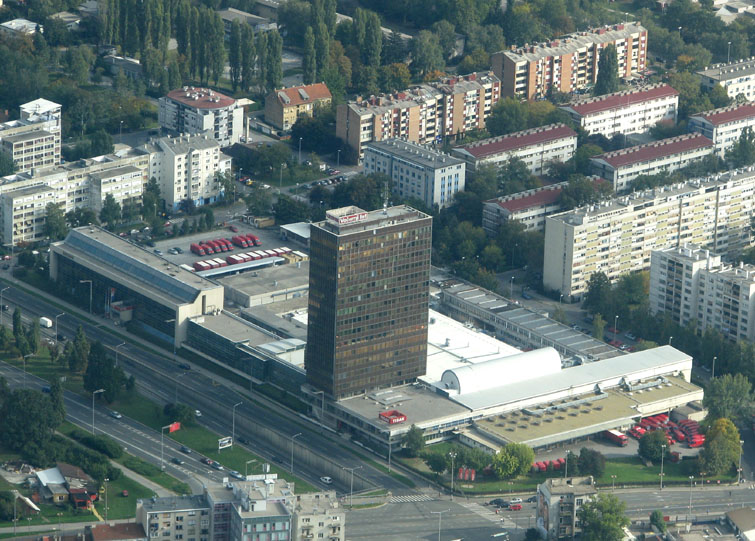
Aerial view of the building, 2008

=== Newspaper ===
During World War II and the Nazi-allied Independent State of Croatia regime which controlled the country, the paper served as the primary media publication of the Yugoslav Partisans movement. The August 1941 edition of the paper featured the statement "Smrt fašizmu, sloboda narodu" (transl. Death to fascism, freedom to the people) on the cover, which was afterwards accepted as the official slogan of the entire resistance movement and was often quoted in post-war Yugoslavia.

During its operations, the Vjesnik complex produced print publications in the region, including Večernji list, Sportske novosti, and magazines such as Studio, Start, Arena, Svijet, and Vikend. Comics including Alan Ford were also printed within the complex. The interior included pneumatic mail to transport documents between floors, and antennas on the roof connected editors to news agencies.

Its heyday was between 1952 and 1977 when its Wednesday edition (Vjesnik u srijedu or VUS) regularly achieved circulations of 100,000 and was widely read across Yugoslavia. From late 1974 the publishing house ran a subsidiary office in Frankfurt in West Germany which published the edition of 5,000-10,000 copies targeted at numerous Yugoslav workers ('gastarbeiter') and other citizens living in the country.

Following Croatia's independence and the breakup of Yugoslavia in the early 1990s its circulation steadily began to dwindle, as Vjesnik came under the control of the Croatian Democratic Union (HDZ), at the time the ruling conservative party. Ever since the 1990s, Vjesnik was seen as always taking a pro-government editorial stance, and it even changed its name briefly in 1992 to Novi Vjesnik in an attempt to distance itself from its own communist history. However, the name was controversial and was changed the next year. Political shifts in the 1990s and the beginning of economic transition set off a slow but irreversible decline of the Vjesnik media empire. Waves of privatization and a turbulent media market gradually extinguished the influence it once held. One newsroom after another left the building: Europapress Holding (now Hanza Media) moved out in 2003, Večernji list relocated to Buzin. In early 2012 the paper ran into serious financial difficulties, and the final issue of Vjesnik was printed on April 20, 2012. it ceased printing. By May 2012 Vjesnik operated only as a web portal. By 12 June 2012, the web portal was still accessible, but it was no longer updated, and in July 2012 the website was defunct.

In the years that followed, the tower became trapped in a tangle of unresolved property and ownership issues. The state ended up holding a 61-percent majority stake, while the remaining shares were split among private companies. Endless legal disputes and an unfinished subdivision of the building blocked any serious redevelopment plans, leaving its vast potential untouched.

The only sign of life came from the 15th floor, where Radio Laganini FM continued to broadcast — the last media beacon inside the abandoned concrete giant. Still, things finally seemed to move in a better direction once the state took a more active role, relocating the Reconstruction Fund into part of the complex and completing the long-delayed subdivision process. This reopened the door to revitalization and rekindled hopes of a true revival.

The last blow came in 2022, when the printing house shut down, leaving the 30,000-square-meter complex an empty shell abandoned, and steadily decaying. A sharp drop in average daily circulation occurred from 1997 (21,348) to 2005 (9,660) down from over 100,000 in 1960.

=== Building ===
The building was designed by Croatian architect Antun Ulrich according to a competition project from 1957, the construction started from 1963 to 1972 and lasted full 9 years, mostly because of lack of financing. Inspired by American business architecture - Lever House building in New York, at the time of its completion it was one of the most modern office buildings in Europe, and soon became the tallest buildings in Croatia with the height of 67 meters. Its recognizable facade of reflective glass in brown and orange tones, which reflected heat but let in light, earned it the popular nickname “Chocolate Tower”. It introduced the then revolutionary concept of open office spaces on the floors, perfectly adapted to the hectic rhythm of the newspaper editorial offices that found their home there.

=== November 2025 fire ===
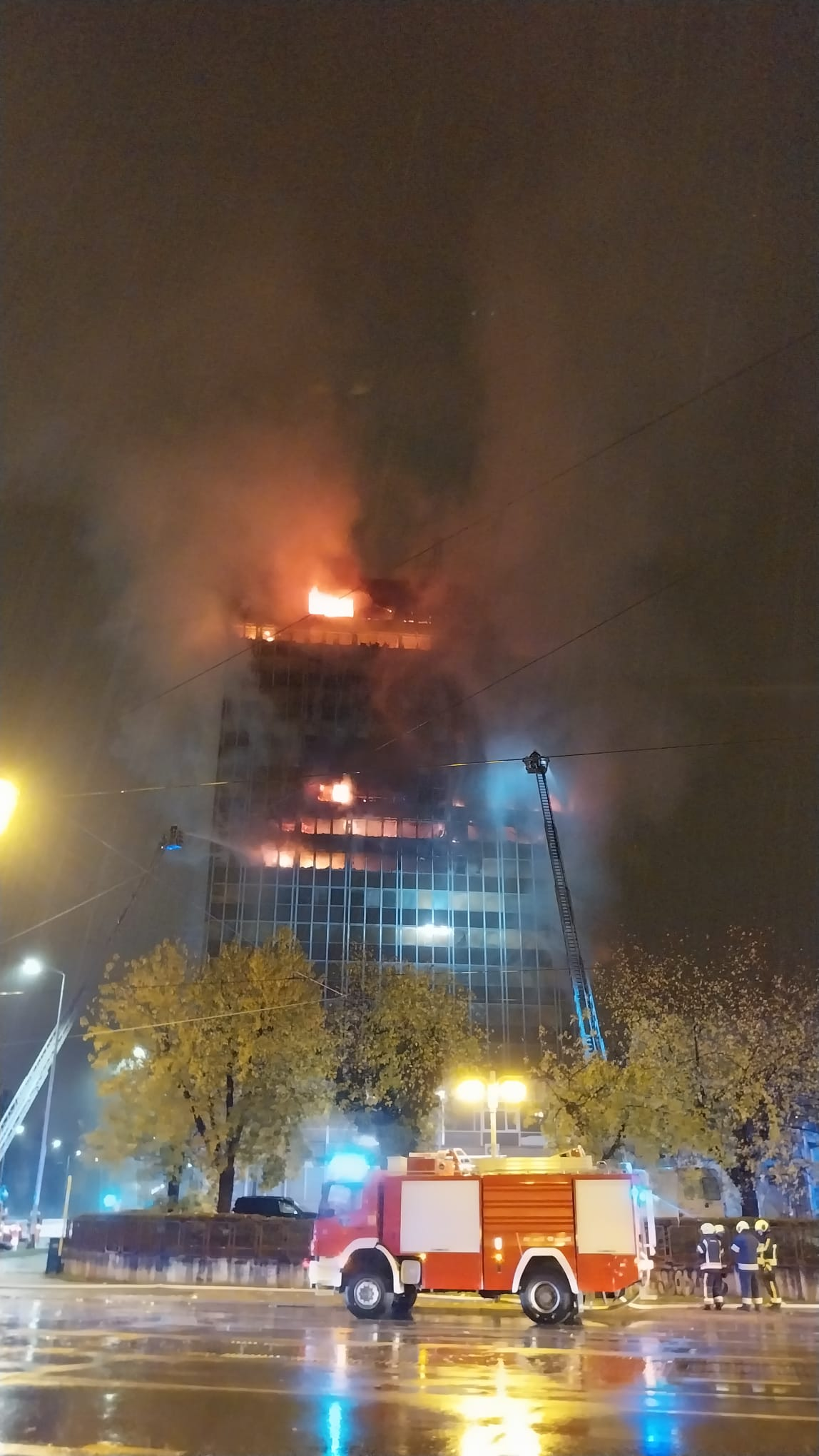
Vjesnik building during the fire, on 18 November 2025

On the evening of 17 November 2025, around 23:00, the top floors of the Vjesnik building caught on fire and the flames spread downward. Due to a high level of danger, the firefighters could not stay in the building and pulled back from the interior, and instead focusing on putting the fire out from outside. The building remained alight throughout the night and the following day, engulfing the upper half of the building and the roof. According to the Civil Protection Directorate, 93 firefighters were battling the blaze with 30 vehicles on site. No one was injured.

The Republic of Croatia co-owns the business complex together with several other legal entities. The section affected by the fire was used as an archive, while the side wing of the complex (the so-called annex) which housed employees of the Ministry of Construction, Spatial Planning and State Property was not touched by the flames. The cause of the fire is unknown and an investigation is underway.

The fire became one of the largest firefighting operations in modern Croatian history, involving around 100 firefighters, more than 30 fire engines, aerial ladder platforms, drones, and personnel from the Zagreb Public Fire Brigade and several volunteer fire departments. Due to the risk of structural collapse, firefighters were forced to abandon interior operations and continue extinguishing the fire from outside the building. No civilian casualties were reported, and only one firefighter sustained minor injuries.

The fire caused catastrophic damage to the upper portion of the building, destroying offices, archives, and much of the interior while severely compromising the structure's stability. Although the main fire was brought under control within a day, firefighters remained at the site until 25 November to extinguish persistent hotspots and monitor the damaged structure. The cause of the fire was initially unknown, but the subsequent police investigation concluded that it had been started by several juveniles who had entered the largely vacant building. Long regarded as a landmark of Zagreb's post-war modernist architecture and the historic headquarters of the Vjesnik newspaper, the building was considered beyond economical repair after the fire, and plans were subsequently made for its demolition and redevelopment.

== Demolition ==
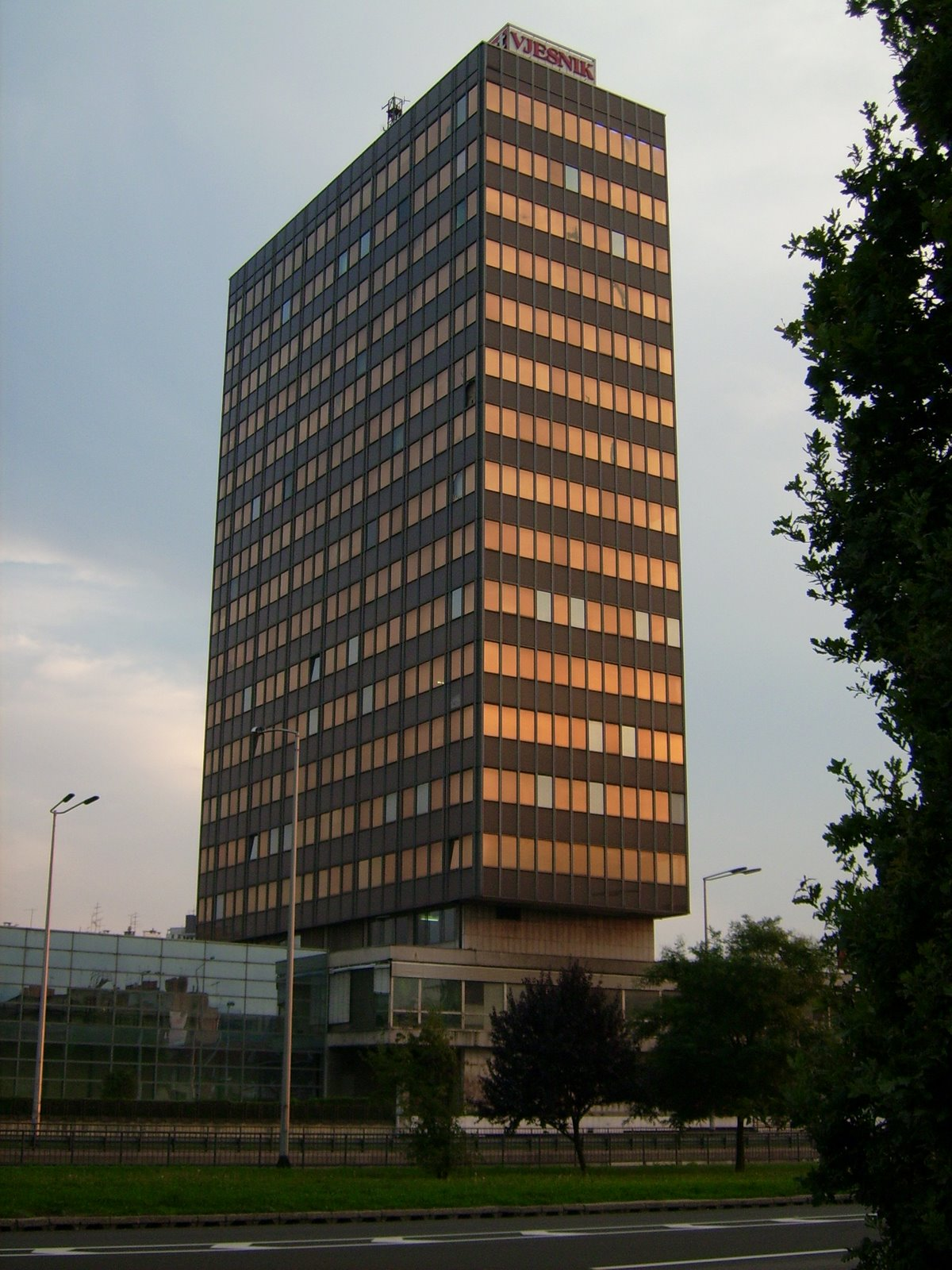
Vjesnik before the fire, 2006

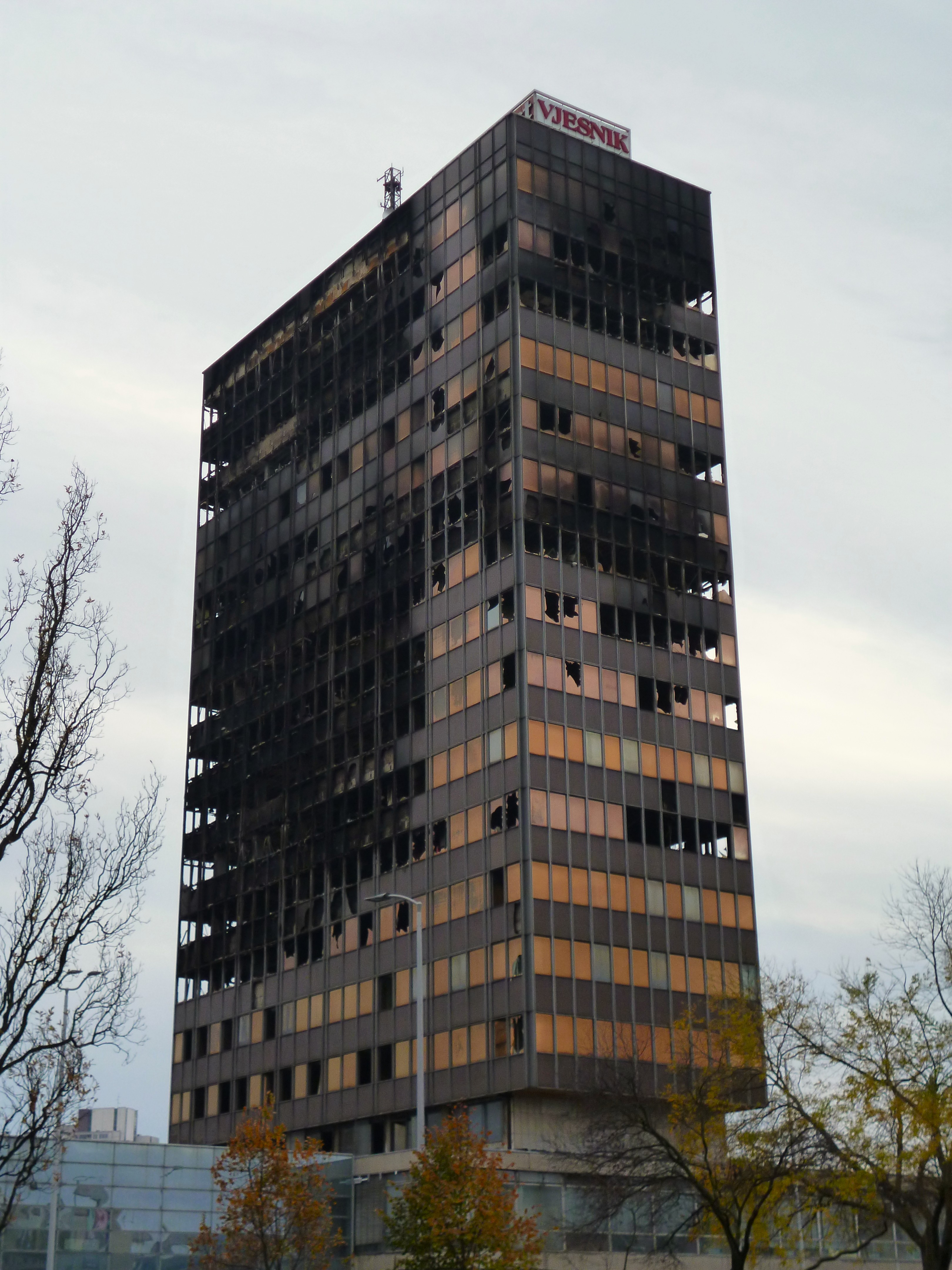
Vjesnik days after fire

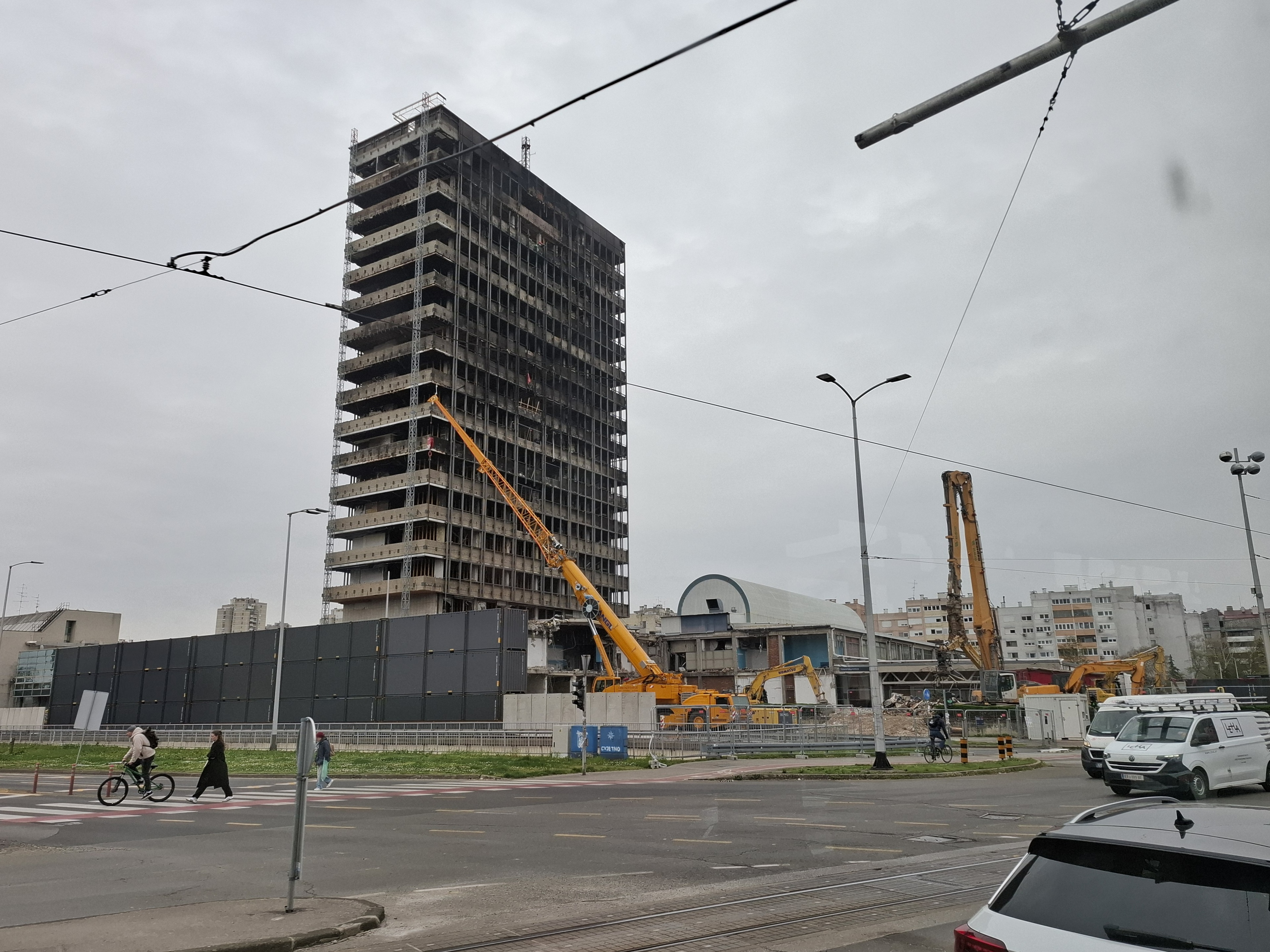
Vjesnik with removed windows, April 2026

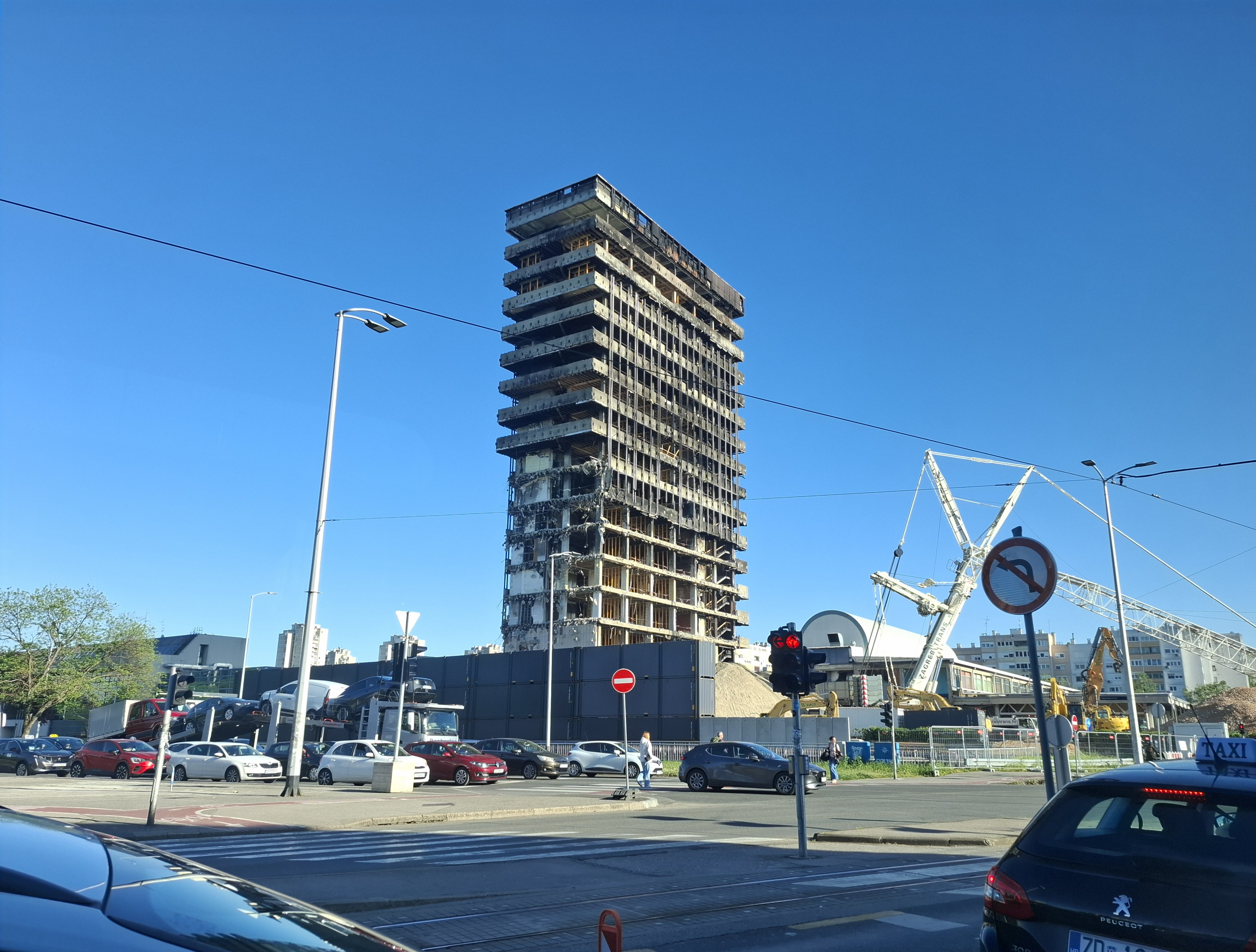
June, 2026

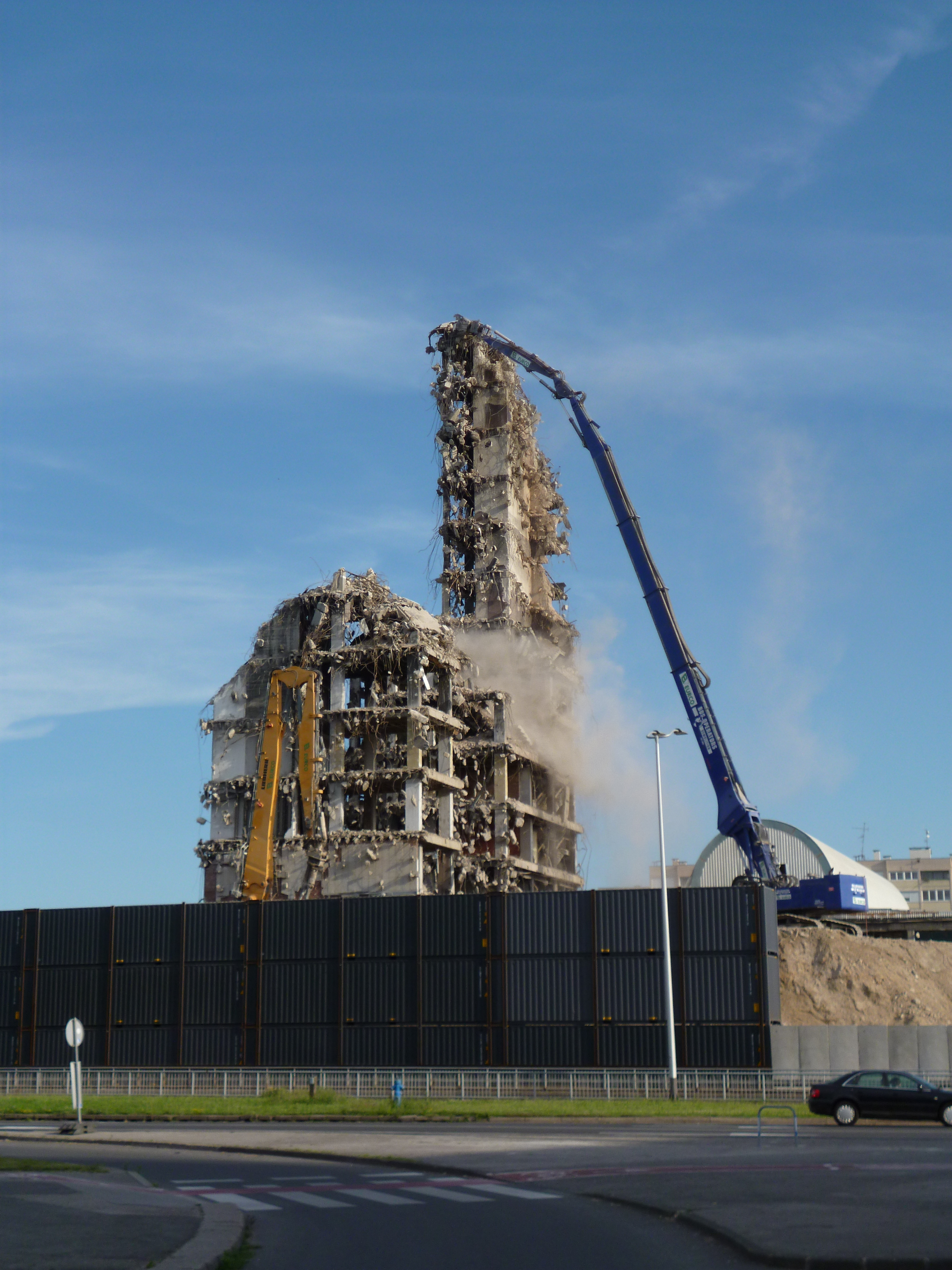
Final phase of demolition - June, 2026

The Vjesnik Building fire became one of the largest firefighting operations in modern Croatian history, involving around 100 firefighters, more than 30 fire engines, aerial ladder platforms, drones, and personnel from the Zagreb Public Fire Brigade and several volunteer fire departments. Owing to the risk of structural collapse, firefighters were forced to abandon interior operations and continue extinguishing the blaze from outside the building. No civilian casualties were reported, while one firefighter sustained minor injuries.

The fire caused catastrophic damage to the building, leaving much of the upper structure gutted and structurally compromised. Intense heat shattered windows, warped steel components, destroyed office spaces, archives, electrical and mechanical systems, and caused extensive damage to the roof and façade. Prolonged exposure to high temperatures weakened the reinforced concrete frame, while water used during firefighting operations flooded lower floors and compounded the destruction. Hidden hotspots persisted within wall cavities and structural voids for several days, requiring continuous monitoring until 25 November 2025. Subsequent engineering assessments concluded that the extent of the damage rendered restoration impractical and the building beyond economical repair. The subsequent police investigation determined that the fire had been deliberately started by two 18-year-old men who had entered the largely vacant building, although judicial proceedings remained ongoing.

Designed by architect Antun Ulrich in the Modernist style, the Vjesnik Building had served as the headquarters of Vjesnik, once Croatia's largest and most influential newspaper publishing house, until 2010. In its later years it housed several national sports federations, the radio station Laganini FM, and numerous government offices, many of which stored archival material that was destroyed in the fire. Preparations for demolition began in December 2025, with the contractor Eurco appointed through an expedited procurement process and commencing work in February 2026. Demolition was temporarily suspended twice—first following the discovery of asbestos on the upper two floors, and later because of a mechanical failure of specialised demolition equipment. Following the successful completion of demolition in 2026, the Vjesnik Building ceased to exist, marking the loss of one of Zagreb's most recognizable examples of post-war Modernist architecture and an enduring symbol of Croatia's publishing and media history.

== Editors-in-chief ==
- Šerif Šehović (1945)
- Živko Vnuk (1950)
- Frane Barbieri (1950–1953)
- Joško Palavršić (1953–1955)
- Božidar Novak (1955–1963)
- Milan Beslać (1963–1966)
- Josip Vrhovec (1968–1970)
- Milovan Baletić (1970–1971)
- Stjepan Košarog (1971–1972)
- Drago Auguštin (1972–1975)
- Pero Pletikosa (1975–1983)
- Davor Šošić (1983–1986)
- Uroš Šoškić (1986–1987)
- Stevo Maoduš (1987–1990)
- Hidajet Biščević (1990–1992)
- Radovan Stipetić (1992–1993)
- Krešimir Fijačko (1993–1994)
- Ante Ivković (1994–1996)
- Nenad Ivanković (1996–2000)
- Igor Mandić (2000)
- Zlatko Herljević (2000–2001)
- Krešimir Fijačko (2001–2004)
- Andrea Latinović (2004–2005)
- Darko Đuretek (2005–2010)
- Bruno Lopandić (2010–2012)
