= Dario Juričan =

Croatian film director, producer, and political activist

- Born: 16 December 1976 (age 49); Zagreb, SR Croatia, SFR Yugoslavia
- Other name: Milan Bandić
- Education: University of Zagreb; London Film Academy
- Occupations: Director; producer; screenwriter; political activist
- Years active: 2003–present

Dario Juričan (born 16 December 1976) is a Croatian film director, producer, and political activist. In 2019, he briefly changed his legal name to Milan Bandić. Although he has written, directed and produced several fictional short films, he is best known for his feature documentary films Gazda and Gazda: Početak, which examine Croatian businessmen Ivica Todorić and Miroslav Kutle.

== Early life and education ==
Juričan was born in Zagreb, Croatia, Yugoslavia, in 1976. He earned his bachelor's degree in comparative literature and German studies from the University of Zagreb. Afterwards, he also earned his degree in filmmaking from the London Film Academy.

== Film career ==
Juričan has been working as an independent film director and producer since 2003. He is a staff member of the Blank Film Incubator workshop in Zagreb.

His 2010 short film Imaš ti neku priču? (transl. Do You Have a Story?) was screened in the competition program of the 64th Locarno International Film Festival. He was awarded for Best Screenplay at the 2012 Croatian Film Days for his film I, J, K, L.

In 2016, Juričan released his first feature documentary film Gazda (transl. The Boss) which focuses on Croatian businessman Ivica Todorić and his company Agrokor.

In 2018, Juričan released a sequel to Gazda, Gazda: Početak (transl. The Boss: The Beginning). It examines the failures of transition, privatization, and the justice system in Croatia. The story revolves around Miroslav Kutle, one of the biggest tycoons of the 1990s.

Juričan plans to release a third part of The Gazda film series, Kumek, which will focus on the Mayor of Zagreb, Milan Bandić. A part of that plan was to legally change his own name to Milan Bandić. His request to change his name was later rejected by the Ministry of Public Administration, but this decision has since been revoked and he is allowed to be named Milan Bandić again.

== Political career ==
On 18 September 2019, Juričan announced that he will run for president at the 2019 Croatian presidential election. In November, the Constitutional Court approved his running under his legal name and overturned a previous decision of the Ministry of Public Administration that forbade him to use the name of the Zagreb mayor. On 3 December, he submitted some 13,000 signatures to the State Electoral Commission. On the election day (22 December), he recorded 87,882 votes or 4.61% of the total votes which made him 5th on the first round rankings and unsatisfactorily for the second round.

== Filmography ==
=== Fiction films ===
- Daša (2008); Short film
- Školica (2008); Short film
- Grand Prix (2009); Short film
- U mojoj glavi anđeo (2009); Short film
- Slikat ću ti rendgenom srce da svi vide da ga jebi ga nemaš (2010); Short film
- Imaš ti neku priču? (2010); Short film
- I, J, K, L (2011); Short film
- Jednom bijah (2011); Short film
- Slušaj kako puca staklo (2012); Short film
- Bomba (2013); Short film

=== Documentaries ===
- Gradonačelnik Denis (2014); Short film
- Gazda (2016)
- Gazda: Početak (2018)
- Kumek (2020)
