= Croatian True Revival =

Croatian True Revival Hrvatski istinski preporod
- Founder: Miroslav Tuđman
- Founded: 3 January 2002
- Dissolved: 2 August 2011
- Split from: Croatian Democratic Union
- Merged into: Croatian Democratic Union
- Ideology: Conservatism; Nationalism
- Political position: Right-wing
- Colors: Red and blue

Croatian True Revival (Croatian: Hrvatski istinski preporod or HIP) was a right-wing political party in Croatia. Founded in 2002 as a splinter party of the centre-right Croatian Democratic Union (HDZ), HIP never won any seats in elections, although it briefly had three MPs in the Croatian Parliament in late 2003. Following poor results in the November 2003 parliamentary election, the party fell into obscurity before being formally dissolved in August 2011.

== History ==
HIP grew out of a conservative citizens' association known by the same initialism, called "Croatian Identity and Prosperity" (Croatian: Hrvatski identitet i prosperitet), established by conservative politician Miroslav Tuđman, son of the late Franjo Tuđman. It was formally registered as a party in January 2002, at the time when the main conservative party Croatian Democratic Union (HDZ) was going through a period of considerable internal turmoil brought about by their defeat in the 2000 general election.

HIP sought to rally right-wing politicians and voters who had been disappointed with the party's change in position from right-wing to centre-right under the guidance of the newly elected party chief Ivo Sanader. HIP thus advocated a return to conservative nationalism which had been espoused by HDZ and its longtime president Franjo Tuđman in the 1990s. It adamantly opposed Croatian government's cooperation with the International Criminal Tribunal for the former Yugoslavia (ICTY) and extradition of Croatian army generals who had been charged with war crimes related to the 1991–95 Croatian War of Independence.

The party held their first general convention on 30 November 2002 in Zagreb. In August 2003 two HDZ members of Sabor, Ante Beljo and Dario Vukić, joined HIP, which made it a parliamentary party. In September 2003 Đuro Njavro, a former member of HDZ, also joined the party, which gave HIP a total of three MPs by the time the 4th Sabor assembly was dissolved in October 2003.

== Election history ==
Some seven months before the party was formally registered members of the preceding citizens' association ran in the May 2001 local elections on a formally independent list. They created a minor upset by winning five seats in the 51-seat City of Zagreb municipal assembly, held by some of HIP's most prominent members including Miroslav Tuđman, former HDZ health minister Andrija Hebrang and navy admiral Davor Domazet-Lošo. In the following May 2005 local elections HIP ran on a coalition list with three other minor parties but failed to win any seats, getting 1.16 percent of the vote.

For the November 2003 general election HIP formed a right-wing coalition with Croatian Bloc (HB), another hardline nationalist HDZ splinter party led by former senior HDZ member Ivić Pašalić. However, the HB-HIP coalition fared poorly and failed to cross the five percent election threshold in any of the 10 geographical districts. They recorded their best result in District XI – the constituency for Croatian citizens living abroad – where they finished second behind HDZ with 9.73 percent of the vote. However, since the number of parliament seats from District XI is calculated in proportion to the total number of votes cast, they failed to win a seat in the 5th Sabor.

Following the 2003 election both HIP and HB fell into obscurity. HIP continued to exist but did not run in any elections since and HB leader Ivić Pašalić retired from politics. Miroslav Tuđman ran in the 2009–10 presidential election as an independent candidate and finished seventh in the first round with 4.09 percent of the vote. HIP was officially struck from the party registry in August 2011.

== Electoral history ==
=== Legislative ===
Election	In coalition with	Votes won (coalition totals)	Percentage	Seats won	Change
2003	HB	37,954	1.52%	0 / 151	Steady
