= Ivan Pernar (politician, born 1985) =

Croatian politician and activist

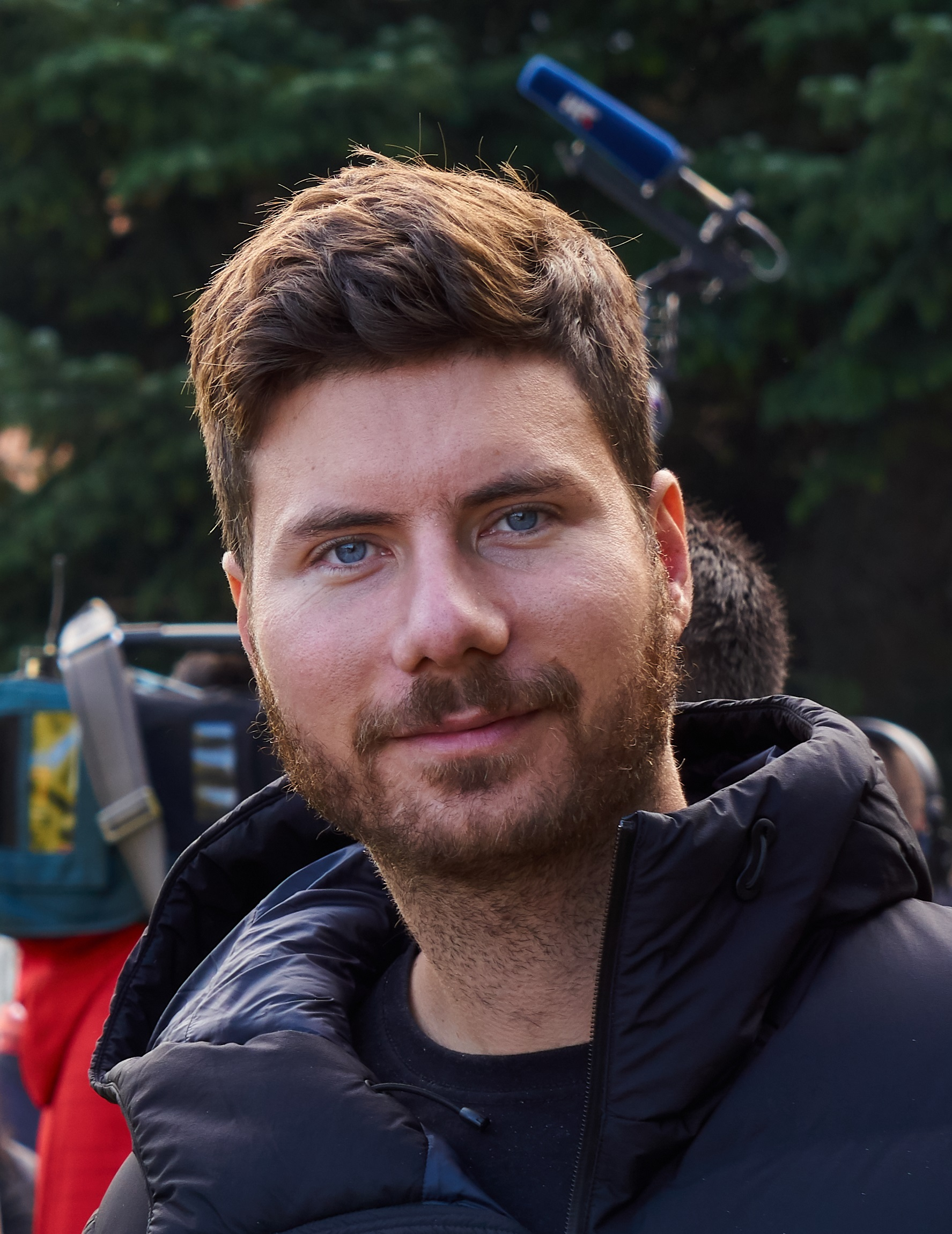
- Pernar at a 2017 eviction in Čakovec

Member of the Croatian Parliament for 6th electoral district
- In office 14 October 2016 – 18 May 2020
- Prime Minister: Tihomir Orešković; Andrej Plenković

Personal details
- Born: 14 October 1985 (age 40) Zagreb, SR Croatia, SFR Yugoslavia
- Party: Green List (2009–2010); Human Shield (2011–2019); Party of Ivan Pernar (2019–present)
- Children: 2
- Education: Professional study program in nursing
- Alma mater: Zagreb University of applied health sciences

Ivan Pernar (born 14 October 1985) is a Croatian politician and activist. In June 2011, he founded the Alliance for Change party, which was later renamed to Human Shield. He was a member of Croatian Parliament from the 2016 elections to May 2020, having been elected in the 6th electoral district on the joint party list of Human Shield, Let's Change Croatia and Youth Action.

In June 2019, he announced that he left Human Shield, the party that he founded in 2011, accusing Party president Ivan Vilibor Sinčić and his wife of "turning the party into private property". At a press conference held in the Croatian Parliament, he stated that he had requested the deletion of his Human Shield membership and that he would set up a new party on 7 July 2019. This party would come to be known as the Party of Ivan Pernar. He ran for president in the 2019 Croatian presidential election, finishing in 7th place after winning 2.31% of the vote. During the COVID-19 pandemic in Croatia, Pernar was accused of spreading and promoting misinformation.

== Personal life ==
Pernar finished 10th Gymnasium in Zagreb and then enrolled at University of Applied Health Sciences in Zagreb, where he earned Bachelor of Nursing degree. Pernar has a son, Mathis Ivan Alexis, with a German woman named Friederike.

His grandfather's uncle, also named Ivan Pernar, was a member of the National Assembly of the Kingdom of Serbs, Croats and Slovenes for the Croatian Peasant Party and was one of several Croatian politicians wounded by People's Radical Party MP Puniša Račić on June 20, 1928.

On 11 August 2019, Ivan and his long-term partner Viktorija welcomed their first son named Noa. The child was born healthy, but due to the parent's beliefs it was not vaccinated.

== Political career ==
=== Green List ===
Pernar joined the Green List in 2009. However, he was expelled from the party in November 2010. In February 2011, Vlasta Toth, the party's president at the time, told Večernji List that Pernar was expelled due to his political beliefs. She claimed that while Pernar was a council member of the Green Party in Stenjevec, he told an audience of around 150 people during a panel on urbanism that "intellectual gossip doesn't lead to anything" and that "he read Mein Kampf from which he learned how to influence the masses." Pernar responded to the Večernji List piece, admitting his reference to Mein Kampf.

"Hitler is a lunatic, and although I did not read his book entirely, I read only the part which discusses how, when sending a message to the masses, one needs to drop to the understanding of the small, ordinary man and the messages must be conveyed in simple words, not with complicated vocabulary and philosophizing. Because the people will never be able to understand if you use highly intellectual rhetoric. There, that's what I said in that discussion. I spoke about the approach to people and that civil associations complicate messages to people too much and that's why people don't understand them."

=== 2011 protests against Jadranka Kosor ===
Pernar was one of the organizers of massive "Facebook protests" in 2011 aimed against the government under the administration of Jadranka Kosor. The protests started in Zagreb, and then spread to all major Croatian cities such as Pula, Split, Rijeka and Slavonski Brod. Despite initial success in mobilizing and leading as many as a thousand people, he soon came to the verge of being physically attacked by the same protesters in Osijek, for mongering people to burn a flag.

After the protests, he founded his own political party "Alliance for Changes", which soon changed its name to Human Shield. Along with other members of his party, Pernar soon engaged in passive resistance to forced evictions in Croatia, for which he was, according to his own account often arrested by the police.

=== Election to the Croatian Parliament ===
In the Croatian parliamentary election, in September 2016, Pernar won 15.66% of preferential votes of his constituency and thus entered the Croatian Parliament for the first time. After one month of work, he became credited as the most active MP in Croatian Parliament by the Croatian media. On November 29, 2016, Stjepan Vujanić, president of political party "Alphabet of Democracy", announced that Pernar would become a member of his party. Pernar later explained that he made this move as a revolt because Croatian Ministry of Public Administration refused to register his new political party "The Only Option". On October 11, 2016, he was criticized by parliament speaker Željko Reiner for eating pizza during a session. On December 14, 2016, Pernar accused Croatian Academy of Sciences and Arts of being "a decorative office, cultural poseurs and quasi-intellectuals" for not dealing with issues of relevance for Croatian society.

On January 20, 2017, Pernar and his party colleague Ivan Vilibor Sinčić became the first MPs to have been forcibly expelled from the parliament since Croatia's independence, after Pernar refused to leave the session on order of speaker Željko Reiner.

== Views ==
=== Criticism of the Catholic Church in Croatia ===
In January 2017, Pernar declared that he no longer identified as a Roman Catholic, and accused the Catholic Church in Croatia of being "the long arm of Croatian Democratic Union". He criticized the Catholic Church for "banning marriage of clergy members, worship in front of statues, and the infallibility of the Pope". In an interview with Total Croatia News, Pernar stood against the funding of the Catholic Church from the state budget, indicating that it caused a perverse incentive for the Catholic Church to participate in partisan politics:

"The money is being taken compulsorily from everybody, and then the clergy receives hundreds of millions of kuna. Then it is only logical that the clergy supports the Croatian Democratic Union in return."

When he was asked about his alleged impartiality to the Serbian Orthodox Church, Pernar said that the Orthodox Church "realized its mistake from the time when it advocated for nationalism, and it is not longer advocating that in Croatia." Referring to the Republika Srpska Krajina as "the insurgency", Pernar added that "Orthodox priests took part in the insurgency, which ended catastrophically for the Serbian people."

Pernar and the Serbian Orthodox Church became a focus of the local press again on January 6, 2017, when he attended a Badnjak ceremony after having been invited by a Serbian Orthodox Church. He later wrote on his Facebook page that "the Serbian Orthodox Church does not have the goal of bringing the Croatian Democratic Union to the government, and does not interfere with our politics and deals with religious questions. That cannot be said for the Catholic Church". Index.hr reported that Pernar's writings received a series of chauvinist Facebook comments and that he was also called a "communist" by many readers.

=== Former Yugoslavia ===
In a discussion with Boris Malagurski in December 2016, when Pernar was asked who he thought was responsible for the breakup of Yugoslavia, Pernar replied, "all the peoples equally, but most of all Milošević who wanted to lead a dictatorship, instead of a loose confederation, which actually made a new co-existence of Yugoslavia impossible since he wanted Serbs to govern over all the others." Pernar also gave a mixed assessment about Josip Broz Tito for whom he said, "[Tito] built factories, defended workers' rights, for this I take my hat off". However, he criticized Tito on the grounds of the Bleiburg repatriations, to which he referred when he said, "after World War II he liquidated tens of thousands of Croats, for that I would take off his head." When Pernar was asked whether he is for the reunification of Yugoslavia, he replied that "for an economic [Yugoslavia] yes, but co-existence in the sense of a united state is thoughtless."

In an interview with Moja Hercegovina, Pernar elaborated his views on Bosnia and Herzegovina at the time. He stated that "Serbs in Republika Srpska, although they have their own entity, do not have anything of it. People are moving out, children are not being born, and all of that is a consequence which leads to the disappearance of Serbs in this region." He argued that Bosnia and Herzegovina should be more united, and spoke against Croats of Bosnia and Herzegovina having their own entity, adding that Serbs "would not get anything" from Republika Srpska gaining independence.

"Political leaders need to sit at the table and agree. Entities need to be abolished so that the people won't be embroiled. As long as the people in Bosnia and Herzegovina do not reconcile, they will collapse together and blame each other. If the citizens of Bosnia and Herzegovina haven't decided to live better and as long as they argue on national fundamentals while foreigners economically destroy them, they will collapse and disappear from this region. The citizens need to revolt against the slavish way of managing their country."

"...imagine that I walked around Banja Luka and that I offered every Serb who walked by me a knife and told him that he could kill me because I'm a Croat and that no one would punish or judge him...I am certain that 99% of them would not do that, which means that Serbs are not a genocidal people."

— Ivan Pernar, November 19, 2016

In November 2016, Pernar published a Facebook post exploring the reasoning behind Srebrenica genocide denial, and began with, "I noticed that some Serbs are afraid to be labeled as a genocidal people if they admit there was genocide in Srebrenica." In the same piece, he wrote that the Independent State of Croatia (using the term "Croatian government") was responsible for genocide in Jasenovac, and that Operation Storm was an act of ethnic cleansing. However, he distinguished the Croatian people from the government, asserting that the responsibility was that of a "genocidal group of people and those who were manipulated by their politics." His party, Human Shield, subsequently published a statement distancing from Pernar's statements about Jasenovac and Operation Storm, saying that "...in the case of assessing events from the Croatian past he didn't only not put forward opinions of the party, moreover, he put forward opinions which are the opposite of the overwhelming majority of the membership of Human Shield."

=== Foreign policy ===
==== European Union ====
In an interview with Croatian news site 4Dportal, Pernar said that his party is "against entry into the European Union because it is ruled by unelected banker cartels and bureaucrats, there is no democracy [in the EU]." In another interview, he stated that his party would only consider a coalition with other parties if they challenge or terminate Croatia's membership of the European Union.

==== NATO ====
On November 23, 2016, Pernar spoke to the Croatian Parliament against the ratification of Montenegro's accession to NATO, reading a letter written by Montenegrin activist Marko Milačić.

==== Israel and Palestine ====
In a guest appearance for Bosnian channel OSM Televizija's talk show called "Face of the Nation", Pernar said that Israel was responsible for ethnic cleansing in the 1948 Palestinian expulsion and flight. In November 2016, Pernar wore a Palestinian scarf to the Croatian Parliament.

==== Gulf of Piran Dispute ====
In his interview to Novi List, Pernar advocated deployment of Croatian Navy vessels to Gulf of Piran, adding that Slovenia has no navy and that by doing so, Croatia would send the message to Slovenia - "ours is bigger".

=== Social issues ===
In September 2016, Pernar participated in a discussion with LGBT portal Crol.hr about the LGBT community in Croatia. Pernar said that "homosexuals are not an endangered group", but stated that they are "one of a long series of groups which the clerical right turned their backs on." Pernar gave a mixed assessment of gay activism in Croatia, saying that "unfortunately, some gay activists reduce their struggle to a narrow spectrum of society". However, he did say that homosexuals should have protection from the state, saying "so that if their parents throw them out of their homes they don't have to prostitute themselves in order to not become homeless, so that they can have normal jobs, pay, and so they don't live in fear of [law] enforcement or the cutting off of electricity and water."

In December 2016, Pernar argued for the legalization of marijuana in Croatia. He suggested that it would reduce emigration from Croatia if it were legalized because of the huge economic benefits legalisation brings.

=== Major construction projects in Croatia ===
==== Pelješac Bridge ====
Pernar described the construction of the Pelješac bridge as "madness", adding that the project is too expensive, while at the same time putting Croatia into conflict with Bosnia and Herzegovina. He went on to say that this bridge is only being built to provoke Bosnia and predicted that it will surely become a failed investment.

== Controversies ==
In October 2016, Pernar was a guest to TV personality Vesna Kljajić on Z1 Television. Pernar claimed he had met Freemasons while visiting the Czech Republic. He alleged that the Freemasons offered him power and media exposure, under the condition that he "does not bring into question the process of making money". He said that he rejected this offer in favor of going his own way, and recommended to all viewers to turn their hearts towards Jesus. In the same interview Pernar said that some MPs in Croatian parliament aren't loyal to the state, but to the secret societies instead.

In October 2016, Pernar accused Croatian lawyer and media magnate Marijan Hanžeković of "being a Freemason of the 33rd degree who sold his soul to the devil and attacks everyone who opposes him using his disgusting yellow journalism". Hanžeković responded by raising a lawsuit for libel against Pernar and asked the Croatian parliament to relieve Pernar of his immunity. Pernar commented on the lawsuit, saying, "Hanžeković is Satan's delegate which insults him for the last five years", and stood by his earlier allegations on Hanžeković and Freemasonry. He also said that he puts "his parliamentary mandate into the hands of Jesus Christ". The Credentials and Privileges Commission of Croatian Parliament concluded that Pernar's immunity should be left unchanged, but warned him not to use foul language and hard words anymore. After Hanžeković died on January 28, 2018., Pernar dubbed Hanžeković "a human form of garbage" on his Facebook page and announced that he will celebrate Hanžeković's death with a pizza. Following day, Facebook temporary blocked Pernar's profile.

In November 2016, Pernar was a guest for Croatian talk show Nedjeljom u 2. After fifteen minutes, he abandoned the studio and accused TV host Aleksandar Stanković of not allowing him to finish his talking points. He later uploaded a video to social media, in which he threatened to fire Stanković should his party come to power. Stanković responded by filing a lawsuit against Pernar, stating that he started to receive threats as a result of the Pernar conflict. The Credentials and Privileges Commission did not challenge Pernar's immunity, but instead expressed criticism towards Pernar's behavior. After civil lawsuit Stanković won the case in court and Pernar was ordered to pay the compensation of 50,000 kunas.

In December 2016, the Credentials and Privileges Commission decided to relieve Pernar of his parliamentary immunity for spraying a graffiti in Sesvete. In his defense, Pernar referred to a passage from the Bible known as Pericope Adulterae, after which the Speaker of the Parliament Željko Reiner remarked that Pernar compared himself to Jesus. Pernar denied that he compared himself to Jesus, calling himself "not worthy even to wash his legs." However, in regards to the accusations of Jesus comparisons, Pernar did say, "I have a similar role to his. We are both victims of false political processes."

On December 26, 2016, Pernar expressed his doubts on the Berlin terrorist attack in a Facebook post. In his post, he shared a video by Gerhard Wisnewski which claimed that there were no proven victims or evidence of the attack. Pernar subsequently claimed that he deliberately published "de facto fake news" to see if his post would be covered more by Croatian publications Index.hr and Telegram than the affairs surrounding Ivo Sanader and the arbitration of Tomislav Karamarko.

On January 9, 2017, Pernar wrote a Facebook status claiming that pharmaceutical companies make poisoned vaccines which "mark people like livestock". Furthermore, he asked his followers why. "such small needles leave such big marks" and why "vaccined children develop autism". Such claims drew criticism from the local media ranging from calling Pernar a conspiracy theorist, to referring to the MMR vaccine controversy case in order to dismiss his claims. Croatian Children's Ombudsman Ivana Milas-Klarić and certain pediatricians also expressed outrage for Pernar's claims. Milas-Klarić accused Pernar that by publishing such status, he violated the Article 24 of UN's Convention on the Rights of the Child which guarantees children the "highest attainable standard of health" and described his actions as "sad".

Later that month, three different schools from Zagreb reported Pernar to the police due to unauthorized entry, ignoring warnings of their employees, and taking selfies with minors without parental permission. In his text messages to one of the students, Pernar asked a student to skip class to meet him. Croatian Children's Ombudsman Ivana Milas-Klarić, called the text messages "concerning", and criticized Pernar for using the students for political and self-promotion.

Later, Pernar criticized her behaviour during Parliament debate, voted for her removal from office and new Children's Ombudsman became Helena Pirnat Dragičević.

In March 2017, Pernar interviewed English conspiracy theorist David Icke. Later he shared a Facebook photo with Icke and the two men briefly walked together near Croatian Parliament. In his Facebook post, David Icke described Pernar as: "a politician worth listening", while he described Pernar's political party as party inspired by his work. In turn, in his interview in 2011, Pernar described Icke as a man: "who speaks many truths but also has to insert in some fiction, otherwise his messages would be too dangerous for political and financial elites." Serbian film director Boris Malagurski also supported Pernar by making a video of Pernar's anti-NATO speech in Croatian Parliament.

During the COVID-19 pandemic in Croatia, Pernar expressed opposition to the measures introduced as a measure to deal with the pandemic, suggesting among other things that the economic toll of the measures imposed by the government is too great of a price to pay for the only benefit of prolonging the lives of some old people who only had a few more years to live in any case.

In late 2022 and early 2023, a group of Croatians (one of which is a transgender man) was detained in Zambia under charges of child trafficking. The couples in question attempted to adopt children from the DR Congo and bring them to Croatia, but were detained by Zambian authorities under suspicion of false documents. The case gained significant media coverage in Croatia. The Zambian court at first dropped charges against them and ordered their release to Croatia. This changed, however, when Pernar contacted Zambian authorities to inform them that one of the people from the group is transgender, which caused them being arrested again due to Zambian laws against LGBT people. This could also be due to a decision to release being overturned by a higher court to which the defendants were transferred. Charges they face mirror the ones they were originally arrested for, human trafficking due to Congolese laws prohibiting foreign adoption.

== Books ==
- —— (2012). Kako je nastao novac : priča koju svatko može i treba razumjeti [How the Money Was Made: A Story Everyone Can and Must Understand] (in Croatian). Zagreb: Vlastita naklada. p. 103. ISBN 978-953-5723-40-0.
- —— (2014). Mehanika novca: za one koji žele znati više o novcu [Money Mechanics: For Those Who Want to Know More About Money] (in Croatian). Zagreb: Vlastita naklada. p. 109. ISBN 978-953-5723-41-7.
