= Ivić Pašalić =

Croatian politician and businessman

Member of the Croatian Parliament
- In office 30 May 1990 – 22 December 2003

Personal details
- Born: 3 November 1960 (age 65) Šuica, PR Bosnia and Herzegovina, FPR Yugoslavia
- Citizenship: Bosnia and Herzegovina Croatia
- Party: Nonpartisan
- Other political affiliations: Croatian Bloc (2002–2009) Croatian Democratic Union (1989–2002)
- Education: University of Zagreb University of Mostar
- Occupation: Entrepreneur
- Profession: Doctor

Ivić Pašalić (pronounced [ǐːʋit͡ɕ paʃǎliːt͡ɕ]; born 3 November 1960) is a Croatian politician and former prominent member of the Croatian Democratic Union (HDZ).

== Education and medical career ==
Pašalić was born in Šuica, Bosnia and Herzegovina. He attended high school in Zagreb and in 1980 he entered the Faculty of Medicine at the University of Zagreb. He graduated in 1986 and gained a master's degree from the Faculty of Medicine at the University of Mostar, where he specialised internal medicine.

He started to work as a doctor in Lepoglava where he worked for two years, after which he was employed at the Hospital for Pulmonary Diseases and TB in Klenovnik where he worked as a director as well. In 1992 he became a director of the Prison Hospital in Zagreb.

== Political career ==
Pašalić was one of the founders of the HDZ in Varaždin and Ivanec in 1989. Between 1990 and 2002 Pašalić was a member of parliament, elected as such for three terms. During the time he was president of the Executive Committee of the HDZ and member of the party's presidency. Pašalić was an advisor of the Croatian president Franjo Tuđman. He was referred to as the number two man in the country. In 1996, Pašalić was instrumental in the effort to suppress Radio 101.

In the late 1990s, Pašalić became target of a media campaign linking him to Miroslav Kutle, Vinko Grubišić, Ninoslav Pavić and others. They allegedly entered into a series of secret partnerships which resulted in the formation a company called "Grupo" in 1996, which was influential in the early operation of Nova TV, founded in 1999.

After Tuđman's death, Pašalić's reputation and influence in the HDZ was decreasing. After the defeat of HDZ at the 2000 parliamentary elections, in 2002 Pašalić formally challenged the new HDZ leader Ivo Sanader for party leadership, but ultimately failed, on a dramatic party convention, where Slavonian party politicians including Vladimir Šeks and Branimir Glavaš played an influential role in Pašalić's defeat. New president of the HDZ, Ivo Sanader, start the reorganisation of the party and Pašalić was his opponent. Soon after, Pašalić left the HDZ. He formed his own party called Croatian Bloc (Hrvatski blok, "HB"). He remained a member of parliament until the end of 2003. In the 2003 parliamentary elections, HB did not win any seats in the Parliament. In the 2005 presidential election, Ivić Pašalić ran as the HB candidate and finished seventh, with 1.82% of the vote.

== Business career ==
Pašalić is owner of several firms such as Kapital Konzulting and Odra Servis.
