= Vladimir Paar =

Vladimir Paar (born 1942) is a Croatian physicist and university professor.

Paar was born in Zagreb. He graduated from the Faculty of Science, University of Zagreb, where he is currently a professor emeritus. He is a full member of the Croatian Academy of Sciences and Arts since 1992.

His scientific interests include theoretical nuclear physics, chaos theory in physics and technology, computer modeling in clinical medicine, energetics, and the history of physics. To the general public he is known as a popularizer of science, being the author of two books, hundreds of newspaper articles and several television series in the field of popular science.

Paar is a global warming denier and is an advocate of a new ice age hypothesis. He argues that the rise of carbon dioxide level in the atmosphere is the effect - rather than the cause - of global climate change and that the true cause lies in the change of Earth's orbit due to the gravitational pull of Jupiter and other planets of the Solar System. Paar believes that the evidence against anthropogenic global warming is being deliberately suppressed.
