= Miroslav Kutle =

Bosnian Croat entrepreneur (born 1957)

Miroslav Kutle (born October 6, 1957) is a Bosnian Croat entrepreneur. He became notorious for his involvement in the Croatian privatization controversy and has since been sentenced to jail time for embezzlement on two occasions.

== Education ==
Kutle was born in Lištica, (today Široki Brijeg) in Bosnia and Herzegovina. He attended school and the University of Zagreb, where he graduated at the Faculty of Law in 1982.

== Business empire ==
In 1989 he founded UTP Globus, and in 1992 Globus Holdings, later to become Globus Group d.o.o. (Globus Grupa). In 1992, he was voted Manager of the Year (Small Businesses) by CROMA, The Croatian Managers Association

During the 1990s, Kutle's business empire expanded to include the companies Jadrantekstil, Slobodna Dalmacija, Radio Dalmacija, TV Marjan, Kastelanska Rivijera, Dalma, and Splitska banka.

== Privatization and controversy ==
The rapid expansion of Kutle's business empire took place during the years following the independence of the new Republic of Croatia. Previously State-owned and run businesses were privatized, in what has become a controversial process. The relationship between Kutle, the then President Franjo Tuđman, the ruling HDZ party and the non-transparency of the transactions has come under scrutiny in the Croatian courts a number of times since 2000.

In 1999, the Croatian Privatization Fund (Croatian: Hrvatski fond za privatizaciju, a government agency formed for the purpose of privatizing state-owned businesses) confiscated the companies Diona, Jadrantekstil and Koteks, while Tisak and Slobodna Dalmacija were removed by court decisions.

In 2000, following the death of Tuđman, a new coalition government took over and started investigating corruption in the previous administration. Miroslav Kutle was sentenced to six and a half years in prison for his role in the embezzlement of Tisak. In 2004, the conviction was reversed by the Zagreb County Court.

In June 2009, Kutle was again jailed by the first-instance court in Zagreb for a period of three years, for his involvement in the mismanagement of another company that had just been privatized, "Gradski podrum", in 1992.

== In popular culture ==
The 2018 Croatian documentary film The Boss: The Beginning (Gazda: Početak), directed by Dario Juričan, centers on Kutle and his role during privatisation in Croatia.
