= TV Marjan =

TV Marjan is now defunct Croatian commercial TV station from Split, which had the distinction of being the first private television station in former Yugoslavia.

The station, named after Marjan hill overlooking city of Split, began its existence in 1984 thanks to Gordan Franić-Futa, local television enthusiast. Equipped with satellite antenna he began to re-broadcast foreign television programmes, most notably Super Channel and MTV. The programme was occasionally interrupted with public service announcements in order to win favour of local authorities. The authorities in Zagreb were, however, less friendly and the station was often shut down by government inspectors. TV Marjan, however, began to make original programmes and air it during holidays.

The station finally started on air continuously February 20, 1990. As such, it took part in campaign for first Croatian parliamentary elections and was the first Croatian broadcast media that aired interview with future President Franjo Tuđman.
