= Croatian Bloc (political party) =

Croatian Bloc Hrvatski blok
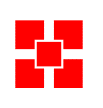
- Founder: Ivić Pašalić
- Founded: 14 September 2002
- Dissolved: 2 January 2009
- Split from: Croatian Democratic Union
- Merged into: Only Croatia
- Ideology: Conservatism; Nationalism
- Political position: Right-wing
- Colors: Red and white

Croatian Bloc (Croatian: Hrvatski blok or HB) was a right-wing political party in Croatia. Its name was often followed by the phrase Pokret za modernu Hrvatsku meaning "Movement for a Modern Croatia".

It was founded in September 2002 following the convention of the Croatian Democratic Union at which Ivić Pašalić failed to unseat his main rival Ivo Sanader. Pašalić and his followers founded the new party, accusing Sanader both of winning the convention by undemocratic means and straying from the nationalist legacy of Franjo Tuđman.

The new party, however, didn't attract the majority of HDZ supporters who rallied around Sanader during the 2003 parliamentary elections. Croatian Bloc failed to enter Croatian Parliament.

On May 31, 2008, the Croatian Bloc Council decided to disband the party. The party ended its activities on 31 August 2008, with its members joining Only Croatia, a marginal eurosceptic right-wing party. Croatian Bloc was officially erased from the party registry on 2 January 2009.

== Electoral history ==
Election	In coalition with	Votes won (coalition totals)	Percentage	Seats won	Change
2003	HIP	37,954	1.52%	0 / 151	Steady
