= Cabinet of Zlatko Mateša =

Croatian government (1995–2000)

Mateša Cabinet
- 6th Cabinet of the Republic of Croatia

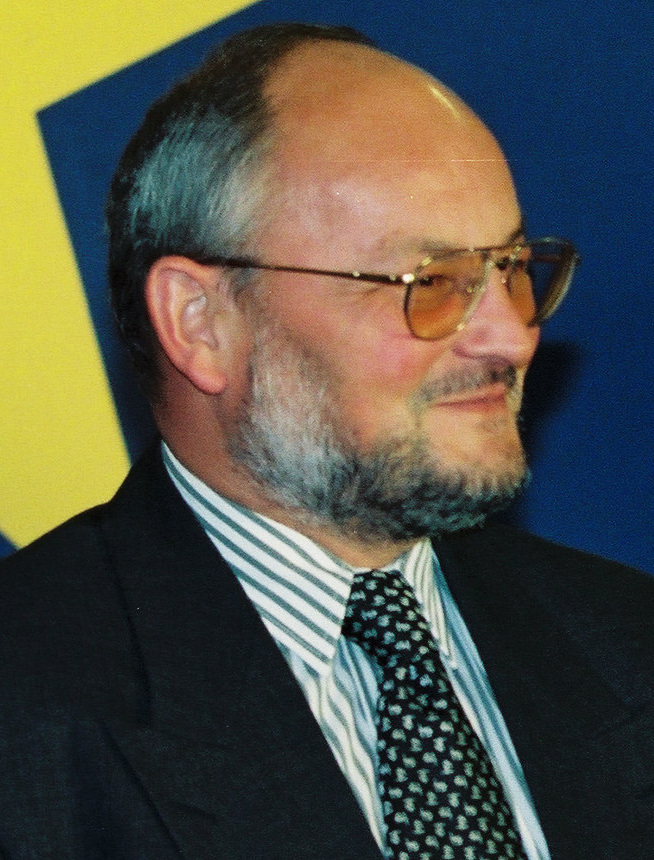
- Date formed: 7 November 1995
- Date dissolved: 27 January 2000

People and organisations
- Head of state: Franjo Tuđman (1995–1999); Vlatko Pavletić (Acting) (1999–2000)
- Head of government: Zlatko Mateša
- Deputy head of government: Ivica Kostović (1995–1998); Borislav Škegro; Jure Radić; Mate Granić; Ljerka Mintas-Hodak (1995–2000); Milan Ramljak (1998–2000)
- No. of ministers: 20 (on 27 January 2000)
- Ministers removed: 22
- Total no. of members: 42 (including former members)
- Member parties: Croatian Democratic Union
- Status in legislature: Single-party majority
- Opposition party: Croatian Social Liberal Party
- Opposition leader: Dražen Budiša

History
- Election: 1995 election
- Legislature terms: 1995–1999
- Predecessor: Cabinet of Nikica Valentić
- Successor: Cabinet of Ivica Račan I

The Sixth Government of the Republic of Croatia (Croatian: Šesta Vlada Republike Hrvatske) was the Croatian Government cabinet led by Prime Minister Zlatko Mateša. Its members took office on 7 November 1995 by decree of President Franjo Tuđman. The cabinet was confirmed by a parliamentary vote on 28 November 1995, with 77 out of 127 Members of Parliament voting in favor. It was formed by the ruling Croatian Democratic Union, and its term ended on 27 January 2000 after the 2000 Croatian parliamentary election, with the appointment of Ivica Račan as Prime Minister. This was the first peacetime government of independent Croatia, as the Croatian War of Independence officially ended with the Erdut Agreement just days after the cabinet was appointed by the President.

== Motions of confidence ==
Vote on the confirmation of the 6th Government of the Republic of Croatia
| Ballot | 28 November 1995 | |
|---|---|---|
| Absentees | 6 / 127 | |
| Required majority | 64 Yes votes out of 127 votes (Absolute majority of the total number of Members of Parliament) | |
| Yes | 77 / 127 | check |
| No | 5 / 127 | |
| Abstentions | 39 / 127 | |

== List of ministers and portfolios ==
Some periods in the table start before the cabinet's inauguration, when the minister listed was appointed to the post in the preceding Cabinet of Nikica Valentić. The subsequent Cabinet of Ivica Račan I, formed by a broad coalition of parties that defeated the Croatian Democratic Union in the 2000 parliamentary election, kept only a single official from this cabinet, the Government secretary Jagoda Premužić.

| Minister | Party | Portfolio | Period |
|---|---|---|---|
| Zlatko Mateša | HDZ | Prime Minister | 7 November 1995 – 27 January 2000 |
| Božo Prka | HDZ | Minister of Finance | 7 July 1994 – 11 September 1997 |
| Borislav Škegro | HDZ | Minister of Finance | 11 September 1997 – 27 January 2000 |
| Borislav Škegro | HDZ | Deputy Prime Minister | 3 April 1993 – 27 January 2000 |
| Davor Štern | HDZ | Minister of Economy | 7 November 1995 – 14 April 1997 |
| Nenad Porges | HDZ | Minister of Economy | 15 April 1997 – 27 January 2000 |
| Božo Biškupić | HDZ | Minister of Culture | 7 November 1995 – 27 January 2000 |
| Gojko Šušak | HDZ | Minister of Defence | 18 September 1991 – 3 May 1998 |
| Pavao Miljavac | HDZ | Minister of Defence | 14 October 1998 – 27 January 2000 |
| Andrija Hebrang | HDZ | Minister of Defence | 14 May 1998 – 12 October 1998 |
| Andrija Hebrang | HDZ | Minister of Health | 12 October 1993 – 14 May 1998 |
| Željko Reiner | HDZ | Minister of Health | 14 May 1998 – 27 January 2000 |
| Matej Janković | HDZ | Minister of Agriculture and Forest Management | 7 November 1995 – 16 December 1996 |
| Zlatko Dominiković | HDZ | Minister of Agriculture and Forest Management | 16 December 1996 – 22 February 1999 |
| Ivan Đurkić | HDZ | Minister of Agriculture and Forest Management | 22 February 1999 – 27 January 2000 |
| Juraj Njavro | HDZ | Minister without portfolio | 12 October 1993 – 19 December 1997 |
| Juraj Njavro | HDZ | Minister of Veterans' Affairs | 19 December 1997 – 27 January 2000 |
| Mate Granić | HDZ | Deputy Prime Minister | 31 July 1991 – 27 January 2000 |
| Mate Granić | HDZ | Minister of Foreign Affairs | 28 May 1993 – 27 January 2000 |
| Ivica Mudrinić | HDZ | Ministry for Maritime Affairs, Transport and Communications | 12 August 1992 – 5 February 1996 |
| Željko Lužavec | HDZ | Ministry for Maritime Affairs, Transport and Communications | 5 February 1996 – 4 August 1999 |
| Ivan Pavlović | HDZ | Ministry for Maritime Affairs, Transport and Communications | 16 August 1999 – 27 January 2000 |
| Niko Bulić | HDZ | Minister of Tourism | 20 May 1993 – 11 September 1997 |
| Sergej Morsan | HDZ | Minister of Tourism | 9 November 1997 – 15 April 1999 |
| Ivan Herak | HDZ | Minister of Tourism | 15 April 1999 – 27 January 2000 |
| Miroslav Šeparović | HDZ | Minister of Justice | 18 May 1995 – 20 April 1998 |
| Milan Ramljak^{[a]} | HDZ | Minister of Justice | 14 May 1998 – 13 April 1999 |
| Zvonimir Šeparović | HDZ | Minister of Justice | 15 April 1999 – 27 January 2000 |
| Ljilja Vokić | HDZ | Minister of Education and Sports | 18 October 1994 – 4 March 1998 |
| Božidar Pugelnik | HDZ | Minister of Education and Sports | 4 March 1998 – 5 October 1999 |
| Nensi Ivanišević | HDZ | Minister of Education and Sports | 5 October 1999 – 27 January 2000 |
| Ivan Jarnjak | HDZ | Minister of the Interior | 15 April 1992 – 16 December 1996 |
| Ivan Penić | HDZ | Minister of the Interior | 16 December 1996 – 27 January 2000 |
| Davorin Mlakar | HDZ | Minister of Public Administration | 2 March 1994 – 4 March 1998 |
| Marijan Ramušćak | HDZ | Minister of Public Administration | 4 March 1998 – 17 February 1999 |
| Marijan Petrović | HDZ | Minister without portfolio | 11 May 1995 – 13 November 1996 |
| Marijan Petrović | HDZ | Minister for Return and Immigration | 13 November 1996 – 1 June 1999 |
| Jure Radić | HDZ | Deputy Prime Minister | 18 October 1994 – 27 January 2000 |
| Jure Radić | HDZ | Minister for Development and Reconstruction | 18 October 1994 – 18 May 1999 |
| Jure Radić | HDZ | Minister for Development, Immigration and Reconstruction | 18 May 1999 – 27 January 2000 |
| Marina Matulović-Dropulić | HDZ | Minister of Physical Planning, Construction and Housing | 27 January 1995 – 16 December 1996 |
| Marko Širac | HDZ | Minister of Physical Planning, Construction and Housing | 16 December 1996 – 27 January 2000 |
| Ivan Penić | HDZ | Minister of Privatisation and Property Management | 27 January 1995 – 16 December 1996 |
| Milan Kovač | HDZ | Minister of Privatisation and Property Management | 16 December 1996 – 1 April 1999 |
| Milan Kovač | HDZ | Minister for Special Relations with Bosnia and Herzegovina | 15 April 1999 – 27 January 2000 |
| Ivica Kostović | HDZ | Deputy Prime Minister | 12 October 1993 – 14 October 1998 |
| Ivica Kostović | HDZ | Minister of Science and Technology | 7 November 1995 – 14 October 1998 |
| Milena Žic-Fuchs | Non-party | Minister of Science and Technology | 22 February 1999 – 27 January 2000 |
| Joso Škara | HDZ | Minister of Labour and Social Welfare | 27 January 1995 – 27 January 2000 |
| Ljerka Mintas-Hodak | HDZ | Deputy Prime Minister | 7 November 1995 – 27 January 2000 |
| Ljerka Mintas-Hodak | HDZ | Minister of European Integration | 4 March 1998 – 27 January 2000 |
| Branko Močibob | HDZ | Minister without portfolio | 7 November 1995 – 15 May 1997 |
| Jagoda Premužić | Non-party | Government secretary | 3 March 1994 – |

^{a} Also Deputy Prime Minister during the dates indicated.
