= Grand Order of King Dmitar Zvonimir =

Grand Order of King Dmitar Zvonimir with Sash and Morning Star
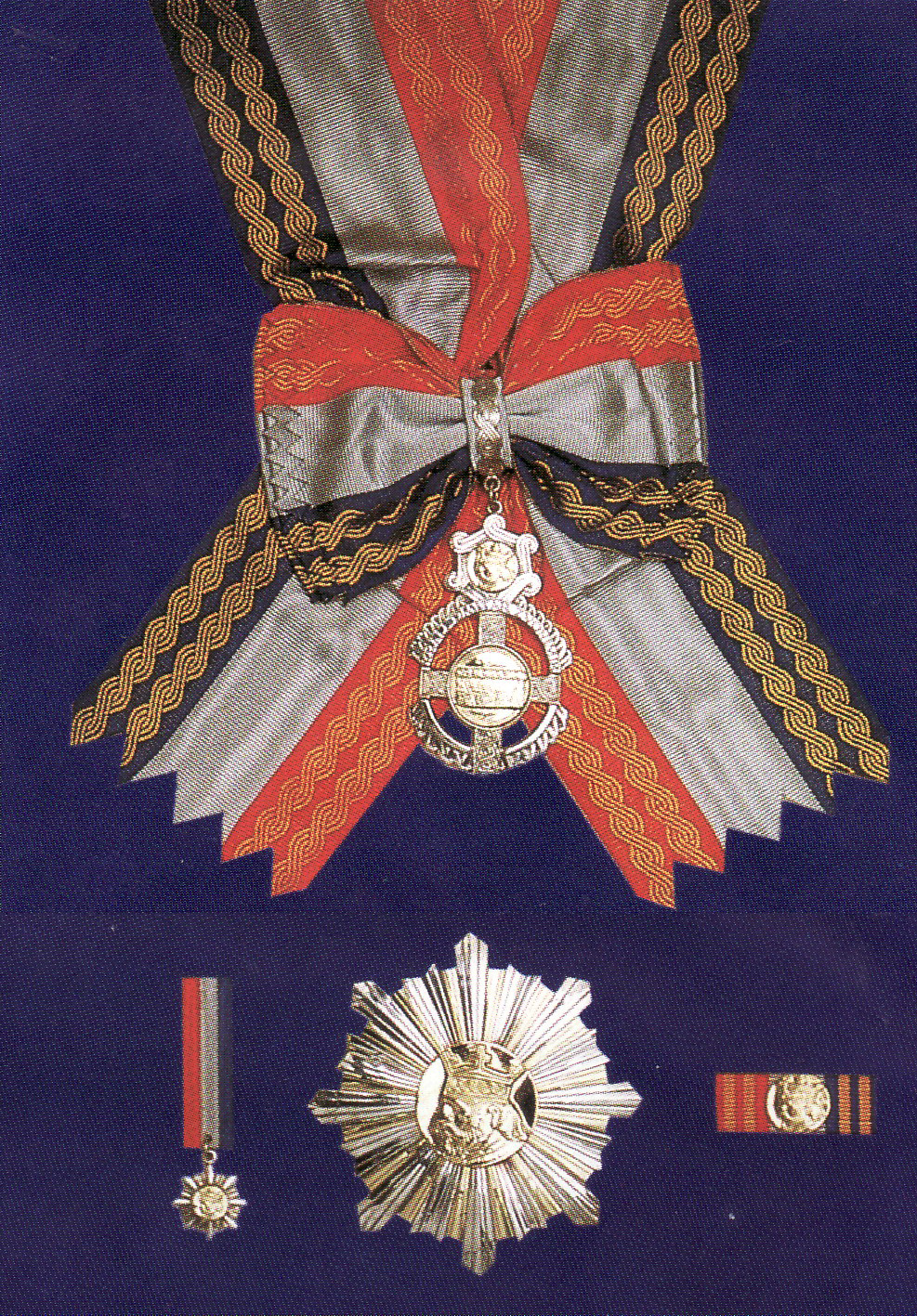
- Grand Order of King Dmitar Zvonimir (top: Grand Order medal with sash; bottom: Morning Star (Danica) medal; left: smaller decorative version; right: Grand Order ribbon)
- Awarded for: Exceptional contributions to the independence and integrity of the Republic of Croatia, relations between Croatian state and religious groups, and for exceptional acknowledgments in cultural and humanitarian work
- Country: Republic of Croatia
- Presented by: the President of Croatia
- Eligibility: Highly ranked Croatian and foreign clerical dignitiaries, highly ranked officials
- Status: Currently awarded
- Established: 1 April 1995
- Ribbon of the Grand Order of King Dmitar Zvonimir

Precedence
- Next (higher): Grand Order of King Petar Krešimir IV
- Next (lower): Grand Order of Franjo Tuđman

The Grand Order of King Dmitar Zvonimir (Croatian: Velered kralja Dmitra Zvonimira s lentom i Danicom) or more fully the Grand Order of King Dmitar Zvonimir with sash and Morning Star (Velered kralja Dmitra Zvonimira s lentom i Danicom), is an order of the Republic of Croatia. It ranks fourth in the Croatian order of precedence, after the Grand Order of King Petar Krešimir IV. The order is among only four orders that hold the title of grand order, and has one class like all Croatian orders and decorations (except the Homeland's Gratitude Medal).

Only highly ranked state and religious officials, whether foreign or national, are eligible for this order.

It is named after King Demetrius Zvonimir of Croatia.

== Recipients ==
=== Foreign ===
- (United States) John M. Martinis
- (China) Dai Bingguo
- (Germany) Max Streibl
- (Austria) Alois Mock
- (Germany) Edmund Stoiber
- (United States) Ronald Harmon Brown - awarded posthumously
- (United Kingdom) Margaret Thatcher
- (United States) William J. Perry
- (Austria) Otto von Habsburg
- (United States) Jacques Paul Klein
- (France) Alain Gerard
- (Republic of Ireland) Patrick Joseph Hickey
- (United States) Arthur Schneier

=== Croatian ===
- 2023 - Antun Vujić
- 2022 - Marko Grčić
- 2022 - Vinko Puljić
- 2021 - Jozo Ivičević Bakulić - awarded posthumously
- 2021 - Dražen Budiša
- 2021 - Ivan Zvonimir Čičak
- 2021 - Goran Dodig
- 2021 - Ljudevit Jonke - awarded posthumously
- 2021 - Ante Paradžik - awarded posthumously
- 2021 - Hrvoje Šošić - awarded posthumously
- 2021 - Marko Veselica - awarded posthumously
- 2021 - Vladimir Veselica - awarded posthumously
- 2020 - Želimir Puljić
- 2019 - Davorin Rudolf
- 2017 - Milan Moguš
- 2012 - Ševko Omerbašić
- 2007 - Franjo Komarica
- 2004 - Vladko Maček - awarded posthumously
- 2002 - Josip Pavlišić
- 2000 - Miroslav Krleža - awarded posthumously
- 2000 - Savka Dabčević-Kučar
- 2000 - Ivan Supek
- 2000 - Vlado Gotovac - awarded posthumously
- 2000 - Miko Tripalo - awarded posthumously
- 1998 - Gojko Šušak - awarded posthumously
- 1997 - Borislav Škegro
- 1995 - Ivan Aralica
- 1995 - Dalibor Brozović
- 1995 - Šime Đodan
- 1995 - Jakob Eltz
- 1995 - Mate Granić
- 1995 - Ranko Marinković
- 1995 - Ivan Milas
- 1995 - Ivić Pašalić
- 1995 - Vlatko Pavletić
- 1995 - Vladimir Šeks
- 1995 - Antun Vrdoljak
- 1995 - Andrija Hebrang
- 1995 - Ivan Jarnjak
- 1995 - Pero Jurković
- 1995 - Vjekoslav Kaleb
- 1995 - Ivica Kostović
- 1995 - Jure Radić
- 1995 - Stjepan Sulimanac - awarded posthumously
- 1995 - Petar Šegedin
- 1995 - Lujo Tončić-Sorinj
- 1995 - Janko Vranyczany-Dobrinović
