= 1992 Croatian presidential election =

- 2 August 1992
- Turnout: 74.90%
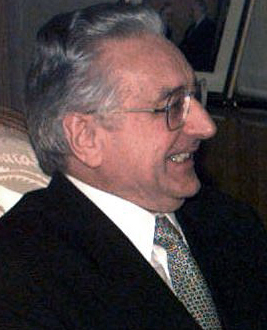

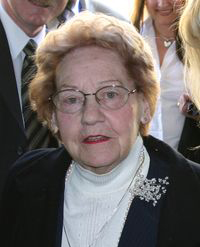

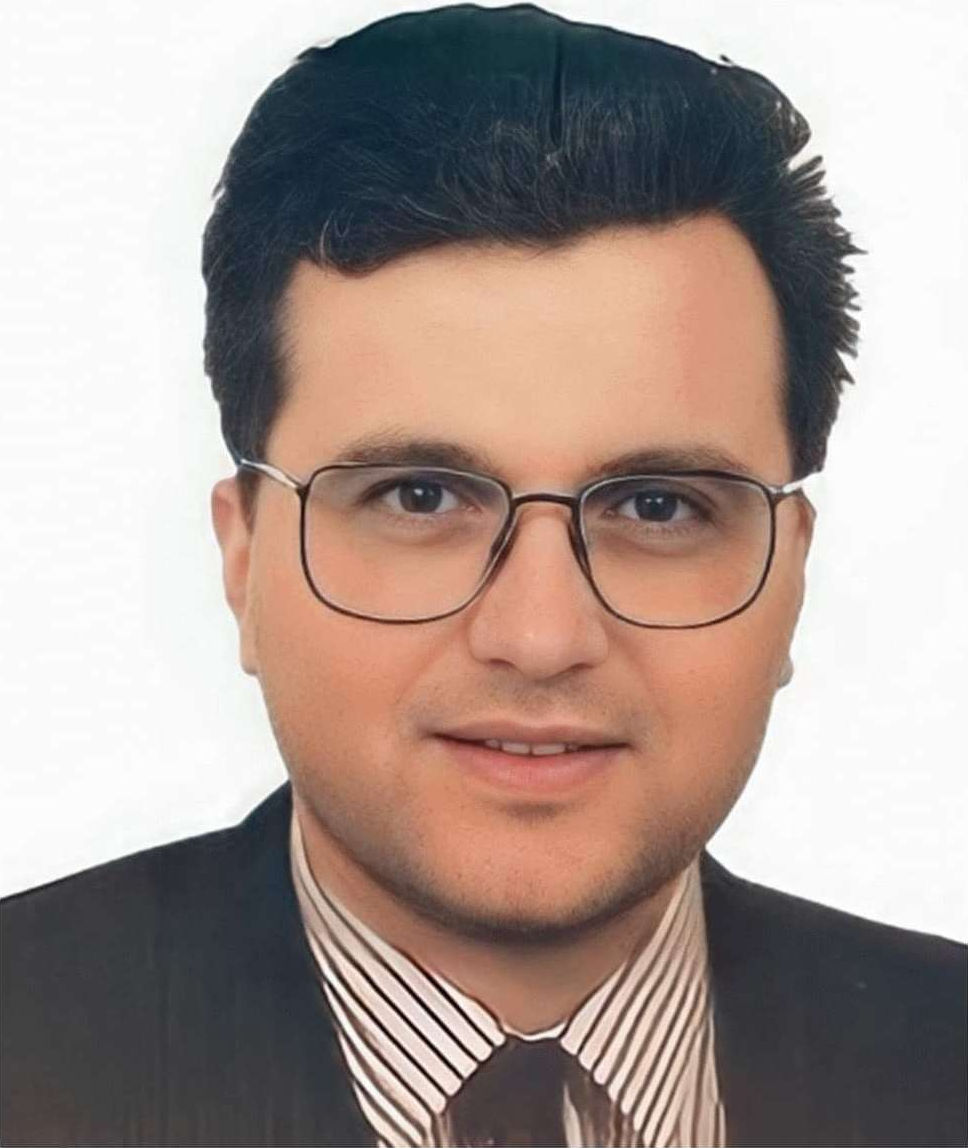
Nominee	Franjo Tuđman	Dražen Budiša
Party	HDZ	HSLS
Popular vote	1,519,100	585,535
Percentage	57.83%	22.29%
Nominee	Savka Dabčević-Kučar	Dobroslav Paraga
Party	HNS	HSP
Popular vote	161,242	144,695
Percentage	6.14%	5.51%
President before election
Franjo Tuđman
HDZ
Elected President
Franjo Tuđman
HDZ

Presidential elections were held in Croatia for the first time on 2 August 1992 alongside simultaneous parliamentary elections. The result was a victory for incumbent Franjo Tuđman of the Croatian Democratic Union (HDZ), who received 58% of the vote, becoming the first popularly elected president of Croatia. Voter turnout was 75%.

The 1,519,000 votes received by Tuđman remains the highest number of votes received by any presidential candidate to date. Having previously been selected as president by Parliament, he was sworn in for his first constitutional five-year term as president on 12 August 1992 at Saint Mark's square in Zagreb.

== Conduct ==
The elections were criticised by international observers, who noted several problems, including issues with opposition access to state media, the timing of the election and the impartiality of officials. The timing was deemed to be favourable to the HDZ government, who had delayed approving electoral laws in violation of the country's new constitution. The period of time between the announcement of the elections and the election date itself was considered "unusually short", making it difficult for opposition parties and election officials to prepare. The elections were also scheduled for a holiday, when a significant number of people would be away from their home towns and unable to vote.

== Results ==
Candidate	Party	Votes	%
Franjo Tuđman	Croatian Democratic Union	1,519,100	57.83
Dražen Budiša	Croatian Social Liberal Party	585,535	22.29
Savka Dabčević-Kučar	Croatian People's Party	161,242	6.14
Dobroslav Paraga	Croatian Party of Rights	144,695	5.51
Silvije Degen	Socialist Party of Croatia	108,979	4.15
Marko Veselica	Croatian Democratic Party	45,593	1.74
Ivan Cesar	Croatian Christian Democratic Party	43,134	1.64
Antun Vujić	Social Democrats of Croatia	18,783	0.71
Total		2,627,061	100.00
Valid votes		2,627,061	98.11
Invalid/blank votes		50,703	1.89
Total votes		2,677,764	100.00
Registered voters/turnout		3,575,032	74.90
Source: Nohlen & Stöver
