= History of Croatia (1995–present) =

This is the history of Croatia since the end of the Croatian War of Independence.

== Tuđman: peacetime presidency (1995–1999) ==
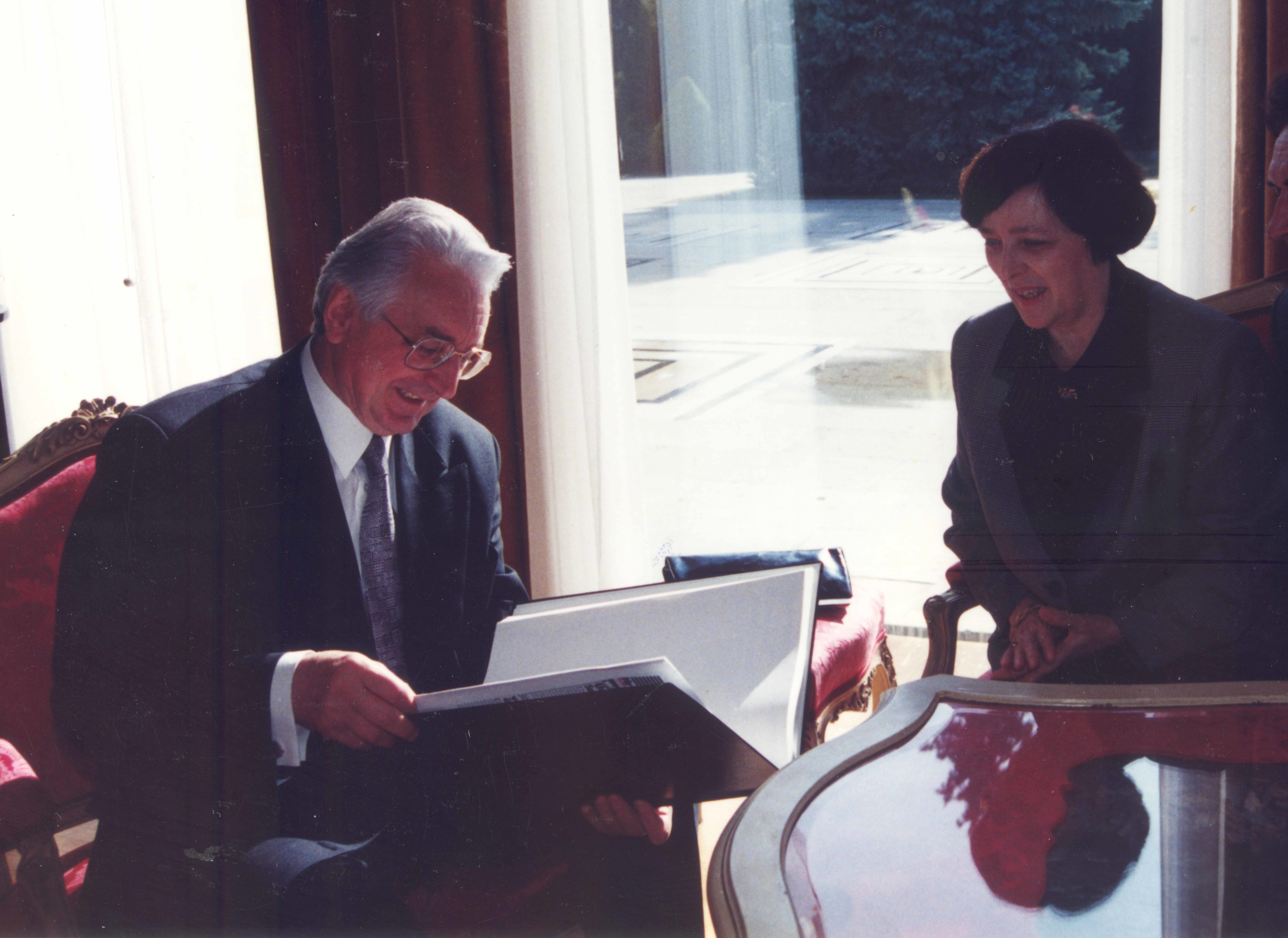
President Franjo Tuđman in 1997

In November 1995 the war in Croatia ended. Around 20,000 people were killed in the war, while official figures on wartime damage published in Croatia in 1996 specify 180,000 destroyed housing units, 25% of the Croatian economy destroyed, and US$27 billion of material damage. Europe Review 2003/04 estimated the war damage at US$37 billion in damaged infrastructure, lost economic output, and refugee-related costs, while GDP dropped 21% in the period. 15 percent of housing units and 2,423 cultural heritage structures, including 495 sacral structures, were destroyed or damaged. The war imposed an additional economic burden of very high military expenditures. By 1994, as Croatia rapidly developed into a de facto war economy, the military consumed as much as 60 percent of total government spending.

Following the end of the war, parliamentary elections were held in 1995, which resulted in a victory of the ruling Croatian Democratic Union. Zlatko Mateša became the new prime minister of Croatia, replacing Nikica Valentić, and formed the first peacetime government of independent Croatia. Elections for the Zagreb Assembly were held at the same time, which were won by the opposition. This led to the Zagreb crisis since the president refused to provide formal confirmation to the opposition parties proposed Mayor of Zagreb. On Halloween 1995 under the pretext of alleged "drug addicts causing riots" in the city, Tuđman's police brutally dispersed Halloween punk concert in town of Samobor. The police severely beat and fired weapons at mostly young concert attendees, and in some cases even brutally beat accidental bystanders. In 1996 mass demonstrations were held in Zagreb in response to revoking broadcasting license to Radio 101, a radio station that was critical towards the ruling party.

As a result of the macro-stabilization programs, the negative growth of GDP during the early 1990s stopped and turned into a positive trend. Post-war reconstruction activity provided another impetus to growth. Consumer spending and private sector investments, both of which were postponed during the war, contributed to the growth in 1995-97 and improved economic conditions. Real GDP growth in 1995 was 6,8%, in 1996 5,9% and in 1997 6,6%.

In 1995 a Ministry of Privatization was established with Ivan Penić as its first minister. Privatization in Croatia had barely begun when war broke out in 1991 and its transformation from a planned economy to a market economy was thus slow and unsteady. The ruling party was criticised for transferring enterprises to a group of privileged owners connected to the party.

Croatia became a member of the Council of Europe on 6 November 1996. President of Croatia Franjo Tuđman won the 1997 presidential elections with 61.4% of the votes and was re-elected to a second five-year term. Marina Matulović-Dropulić became the Mayor of Zagreb having won the 1997 local elections, which formally ended the Zagreb crisis.

The remaining part of former Republic of Serbian Krajina, areas adjacent to FR Yugoslavia, negotiated a peaceful reintegration process with the Croatian Government. The so-called Erdut Agreement made the area a temporary protectorate of the United Nations Transitional Administration for Eastern Slavonia, Baranja and Western Sirmium. The area was formally re-integrated into Croatia on 15 January 1998. On 3 October 1998 Pope John Paul II beatified Cardinal Alojzije Stepinac.

Value-added tax was introduced in 1998 and the central government budget was in surplus that year. At the end of 1998 Croatia went into a recession and GDP growth slowed down to 1,9%. The recession continued throughout 1999 when GDP fell by 0,9%. Unemployment increased from around 10% in 1996 and 1997 to 11,4% in 1998. By the end of 1999 it reached 13,6%. The country emerged from the recession in the 4th quarter of 1999.

== Račan government (2000–2003) ==
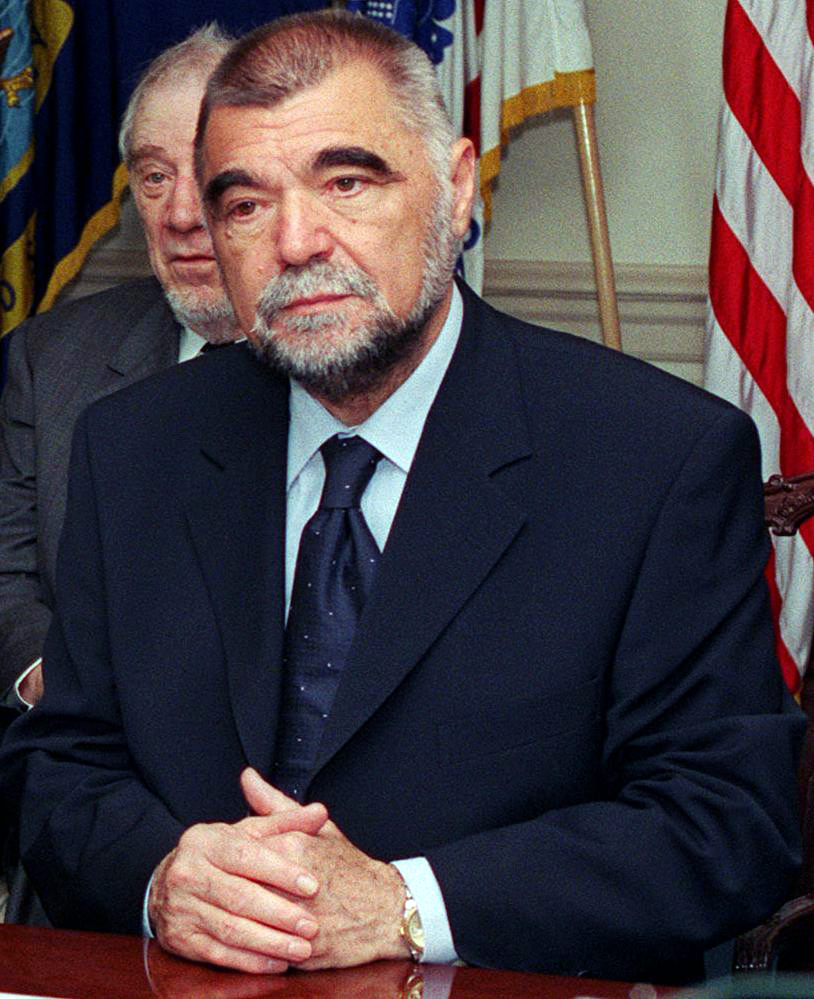
Stjepan Mesić

Tuđman died in 1999 and in the early 2000 parliamentary elections, the nationalist Croatian Democratic Union (HDZ) government was replaced by a center-left coalition, with Ivica Račan as prime minister. At the same time, presidential elections were held which were won by a moderate, Stjepan Mesić.

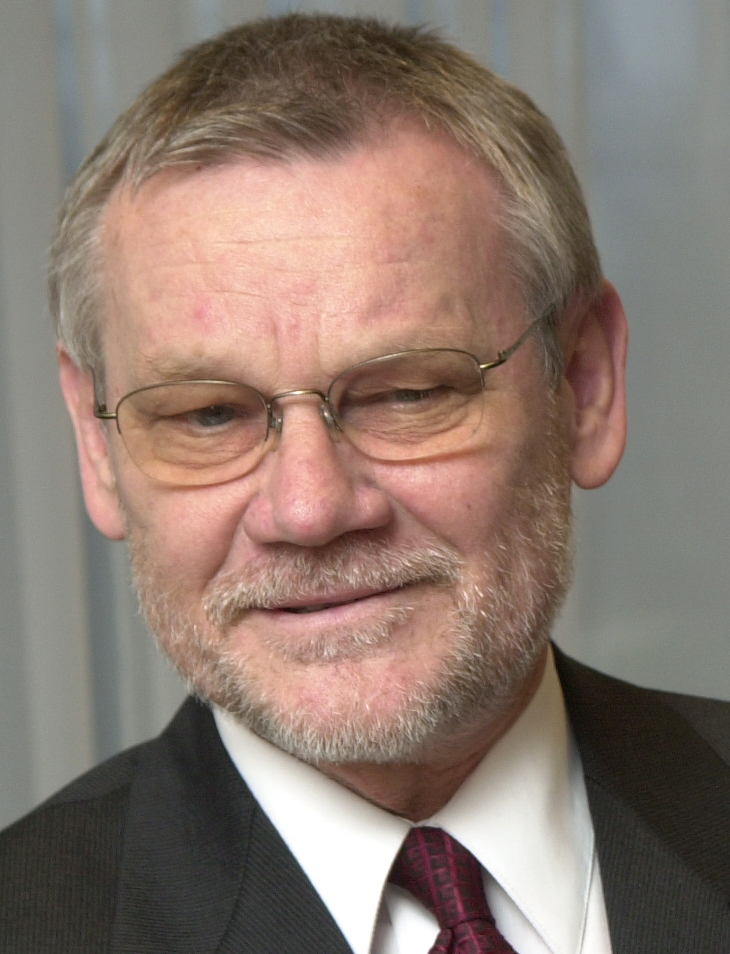
Ivica Račan

The new Račan government amended the Constitution, changing the political system from a semi-presidential system to a parliamentary system, transferring most executive presidential powers from the president onto the institutions of the Parliament and the Prime Minister. Nevertheless, the President remained the Commander-in-Chief, and notably used this power in response to the Twelve Generals' Letter. In August 2000, former Croatian Army officer and whistleblower Milan Levar was killed in his own garage in Gospić by explosive device for testifying about war crimes committed by Croatian forces during the war. The perpetrator of this murder remained at large up to this day.

Economic growth picked up in 2000 following the recession. The new government started several large building projects, including state-sponsored housing and the building of the vital Zagreb-Split Highway, today's A1. Economic growth in the 2000s was stimulated by a credit boom led by newly privatized banks, capital investment, especially in road construction, a rebound in tourism and credit-driven consumer spending. Inflation remained tame and the currency, the kuna, stable. The country rebounded from a mild recession in 1998/1999 and achieved notable economic growth during the following years. The unemployment rate would continue to rise until 2001 when it finally started falling. Return of refugees accelerated as many homes were rebuilt by the government; most Croats had already returned (except for some in Vukovar), whereas only a third of the Serbs had done so, impeded by unfavorable property laws as well as ethnic and economic issues.

The Račan government is often credited with bringing Croatia out of semi-isolation of the Tuđman era. Croatia became a World Trade Organization (WTO) member on 30 November 2000. The country signed a Stabilization and Association Agreement (SAA) with the European Union in October 2001, and applied for membership in February/March 2003. Račan's government was undermined by right wing HDZ who organized mass opposition rallies against Croatian collaboration with ICTY. In one such rally in Split HDZ's leader Ivo Sanader accused prime minister Račan and Mesić for treason for wanting to extradite Croatian officers, while they, in turn accused the rallyists for preparing coup d'etat.

== Sanader government (2003–2009) ==
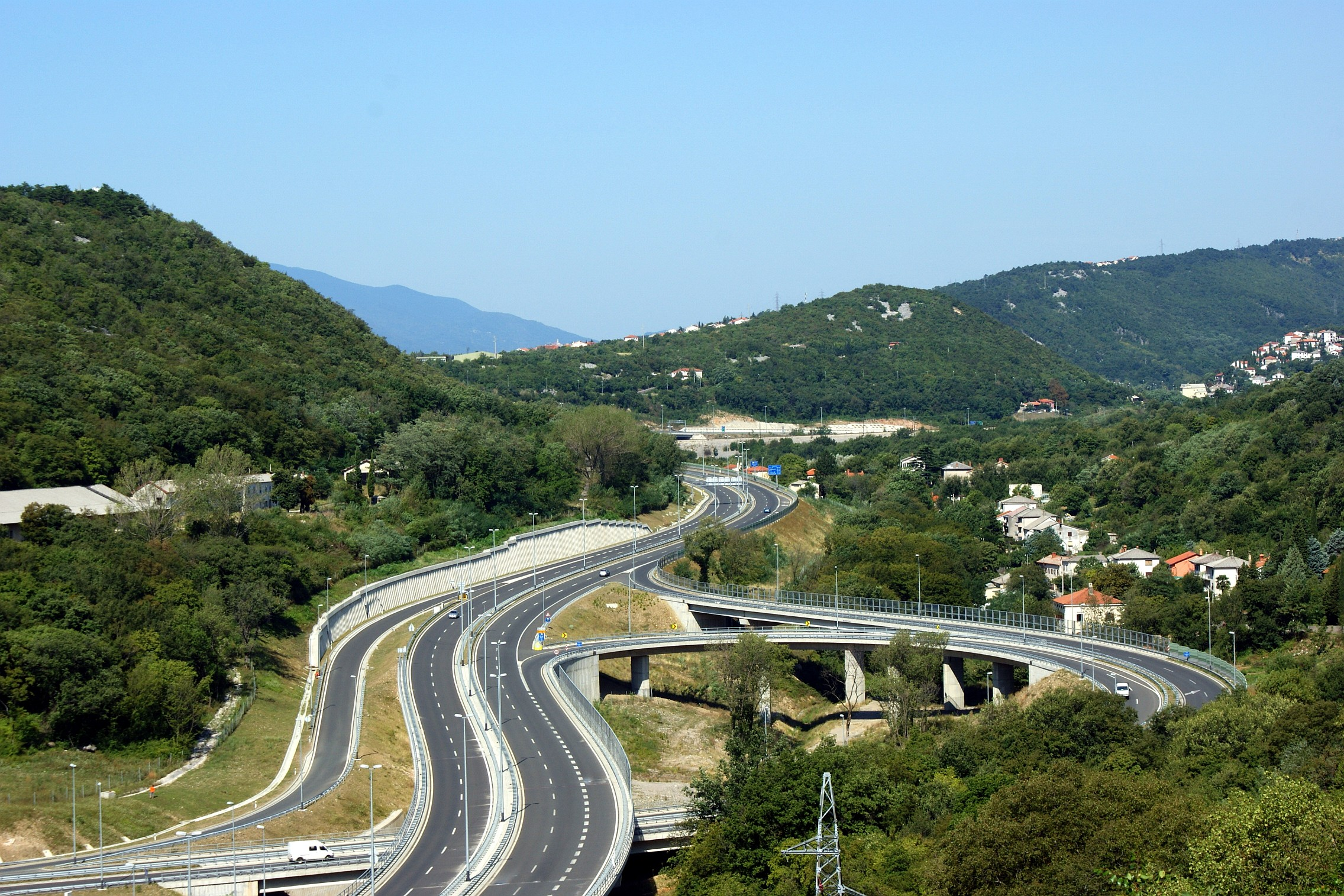
A7 motorway, Croatian motorway network was largely built in the 2000s

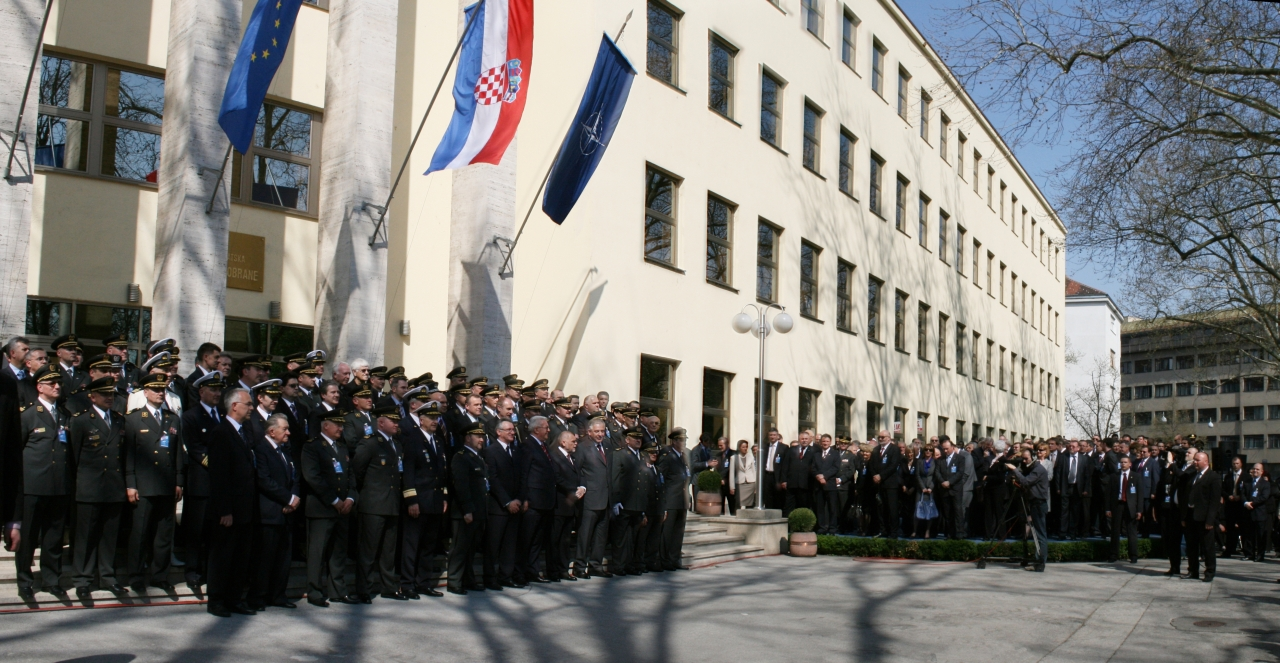
Flag hoisting ceremony at Ministry of Defence in Zagreb, marking joining of the NATO in 2009

In late 2003, new parliamentary elections were held and a reformed HDZ party won under leadership of Ivo Sanader, who became prime minister. After winning elections Sanader chose to form the new government in coalition with Serb minority, rather than with far right nationalist parties. Sanader also took his government on a strong pro-European course. After some delay caused by controversy over extradition of army generals to the ICTY, in 2004 the European Commission finally issued a recommendation that the accession negotiations with Croatia should begin. Its report on Croatia described it as a modern democratic society with a competent economy and the ability to take on further obligations, provided it continued the reform process.

The country was given EU applicant status on 18 June 2004 and a negotiations framework was set up in March 2005. Actual negotiations began after the capture of general Ante Gotovina in December 2005, which resolved outstanding issues with the ICTY in the Hague. Despite Sanader's earlier rhetoric against extradiction of Croatian generals to the ICTY it was, in fact, his government that extradited Gotovina to ICTY. Numerous other complications also stalled the negotiating process, most notably during Slovenia's blockade of Croatia's EU accession from December 2008 until September 2009.

In August 2007, Croatia experienced a tragedy when during the fires that ravaged its coast, 12 firemen died as a result of a fire on Kornat island.

Sanader was reelected in the closely contested 2007 parliamentary election.

The October 2008 assassination of Ivo Pukanić was one of several prominent murders in Croatia at the time which were attributed to organized crime and associated by the media with an increased occurrence of crime in Zagreb in 2008. In March 2008, an 18-year-old Bad Blue Boys football fan was killed in the Ribnjak Park, followed by a retaliation by other BBB members. A mob beating at a bus stop in the high-traffic Većeslav Holjevac Avenue ensued, with deadly consequences for 18-year-old Luka Ritz. The October 2008 murder of Ivana Hodak, the daughter of Zvonimir Hodak, the lawyer who defended alleged war profiteer general Vladimir Zagorec, caused the Prime Minister Ivo Sanader to fire Marijan Benko, chief of Zagreb Police Department, Berislav Rončević, Minister of Internal Affairs and Ana Lovrin, Minister of Justice. Rončević was replaced by Tomislav Karamarko and Lovrin by Ivan Šimonović. In February 2009, the Hodak murder was attributed by the police to a homeless unemployed man blaming Zvonimir Hodak for his problems in life.

In June 2009, Sanader abruptly resigned his post, leaving scarce explanation for his actions. As written by Florian Bieber, the explanation came in 2010 when Sanader fled to Austria due to fear of being charged for corruption. He was eventually extradited back to Croatia. In the ensuing court hearing, it was discovered that Sanadar possessed the collection of luxurious watches, luxurious villa and collection of arts, none of which could be afforded legally from salaries of Croatian public sector. In November 2012, he was sentenced to ten years in prison, which was later reduced to eight and half years. In 2015, this sentence was annulled for procedural errors, but before his re-trial could begin, he was sentenced to four and half years in prison for another corruption case. Therefore, Bieber concludes, it turned out that pro-European reforms which Sanader had initiated created institutions such as USKOK which eventually sentenced him and played a prominent role in his downfall. Bieber claims that HDZ's orientation towards pro-European course became key for Croatia's successful transition towards consolidated democracy, while one of its key actors Ivo Sanader became "a victim" of democratic institutions he had helped to create.

== Kosor government (2009–2011) ==
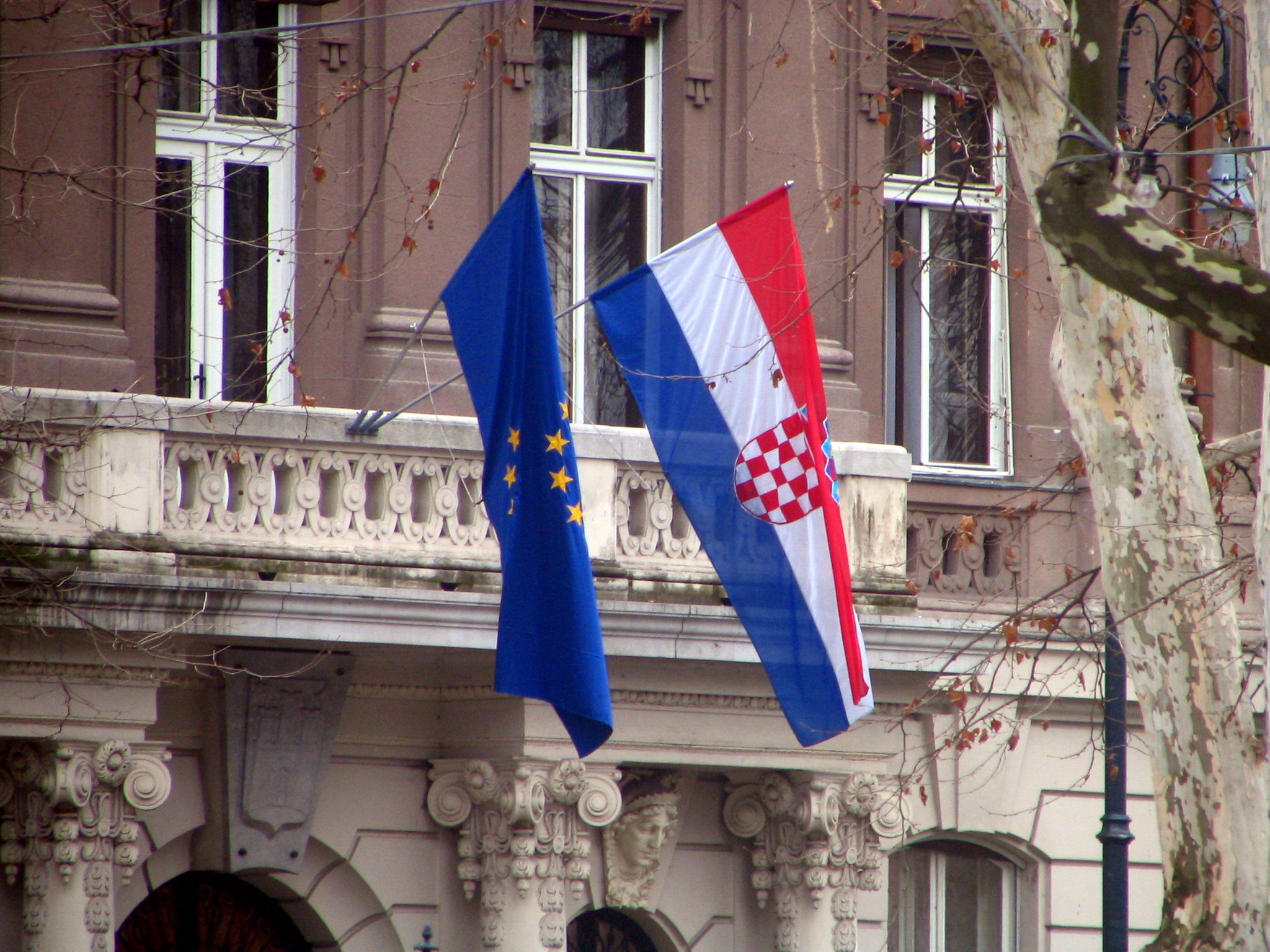
Croatia gained European Union membership in 2013

Jadranka Kosor assumed the head of the government following Sanader's resignation. Kosor continued with her predecessor's policy of integration into European Union She also had to introduce austerity measures to counter the consequences of the 2008 financial crisis and launched the anti-corruption campaign aimed at public officials.

Jadranka Kosor signed an agreement with Borut Pahor, the premier of Slovenia, in November 2009, that ended Slovenia's blockade of Croatia's EU accession and allowed Croatian EU entry negotiations to proceed.

In the first round of the 2010 presidential election the HDZ candidate Andrija Hebrang achieved an embarrassing 12% claiming third place, the lowest result for an HDZ presidential candidate ever. Ivo Josipović, the candidate of the largest opposition party, the Social Democratic Party of Croatia, won a landslide victory in the resulting runoff on 10 January.

Ivo Sanader tried to come back in HDZ in early 2010, but was then ejected, charged for corruption by authorities, and later arrested in Austria.

In June 2010, Kosor proposed loosening the labor law and making it more business friendly, in order to foster economic growth. The proposed new labour law would have set a six-month deadline for hammering out a new collective agreement after the existing one expires. After that, the workers' rights would be subject to separate agreements with individual employers instead. The changing of the labour law was greatly opposed by five trade unions: a petition demanding a referendum gathered 813,016 signatures, far more than the required 449,506 signatures (10 percent of all voters in Croatia), in the first successful popular referendum attempt.

Opinion polling was done for the prospective referendum: an Ipsos Puls for Nova TV poll of 8 July 2010 at a sample of 646 indicated 64% would support the referendum, 15% would be against, and 21% were undecided. CRO Demoskop also polled on the matter on 1 and 2 July at a sample of 1300, and found 88.6% of the polled would support it.

After the Ministry of Administration completed its examination of the signatures, the Croatian Government first hinted that of all submitted signatures, no more than 330 thousand are valid, which would be insufficient for starting a referendum. After a public backlash, they nevertheless passed the signatures on to the Parliament. The government then decided to withdraw the reform proposals on 3 September 2010. The Croatian Parliament could not decide conclusively whether this rendered the referendum proposal moot or not, and instead passed the judgement on to the Constitutional Court of Croatia. The court decided on 20 October 2010 that there was no longer any need to hold the referendum. It ordered the government not to subject any changes to the labor law in the following year.

The government and labour unions later agreed that there would be a different referendum instead, asking the question "Do you agree that a referendum must be called if so requested by 200,000 registered voters, and that the time for the collection of the required number of voters' signatures should be 30 days?". It was planned to be held at the same time as the EU accession referendum, but did not happen.

The 2011 Croatian protests were anti-government street protests in Croatia started on 22 February 2011, after a call to protest over the Internet, and continued almost daily. The protests brought together diverse political persuasions in response to recent government corruption scandals and worries regarding upcoming EU accession, and called for the resignation of Kosor and early elections. They were met by a violent police reaction and a ban on assembly in front of the Croatian Parliament in Zagreb. On 26 February, tens of thousands of protesters met in the Croatian capital Zagreb's Ban Jelačić Square to express their support for indicted Croatian War of Independence veterans and demand for Kosor's government to resign. Several dozen people were injured and arrested as anti-government protests degenerated into clashes with police. In the following few weeks the number of protesters rose to some 10,000 people, but later the protests gradually stopped.

On 30 June 2011 the EU accession agreement was concluded, giving Croatia the all-clear to join, with a projected accession date of 1 July 2013.

== Milanović government (2011–2016) ==
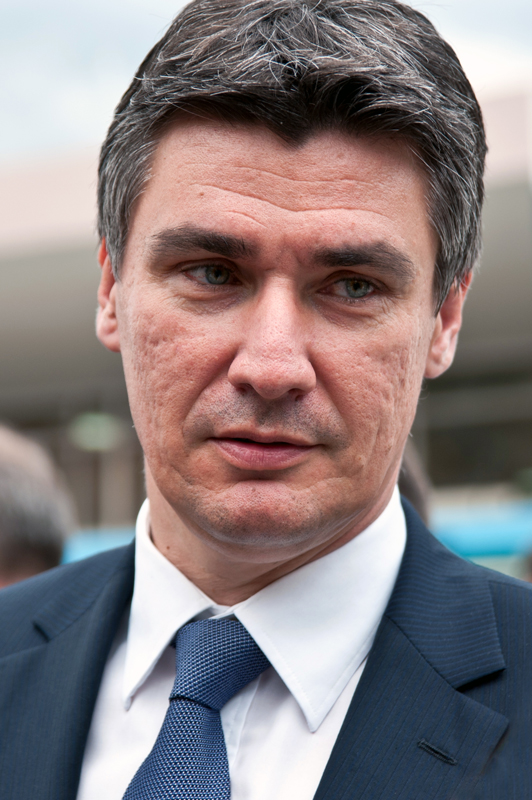
Zoran Milanović

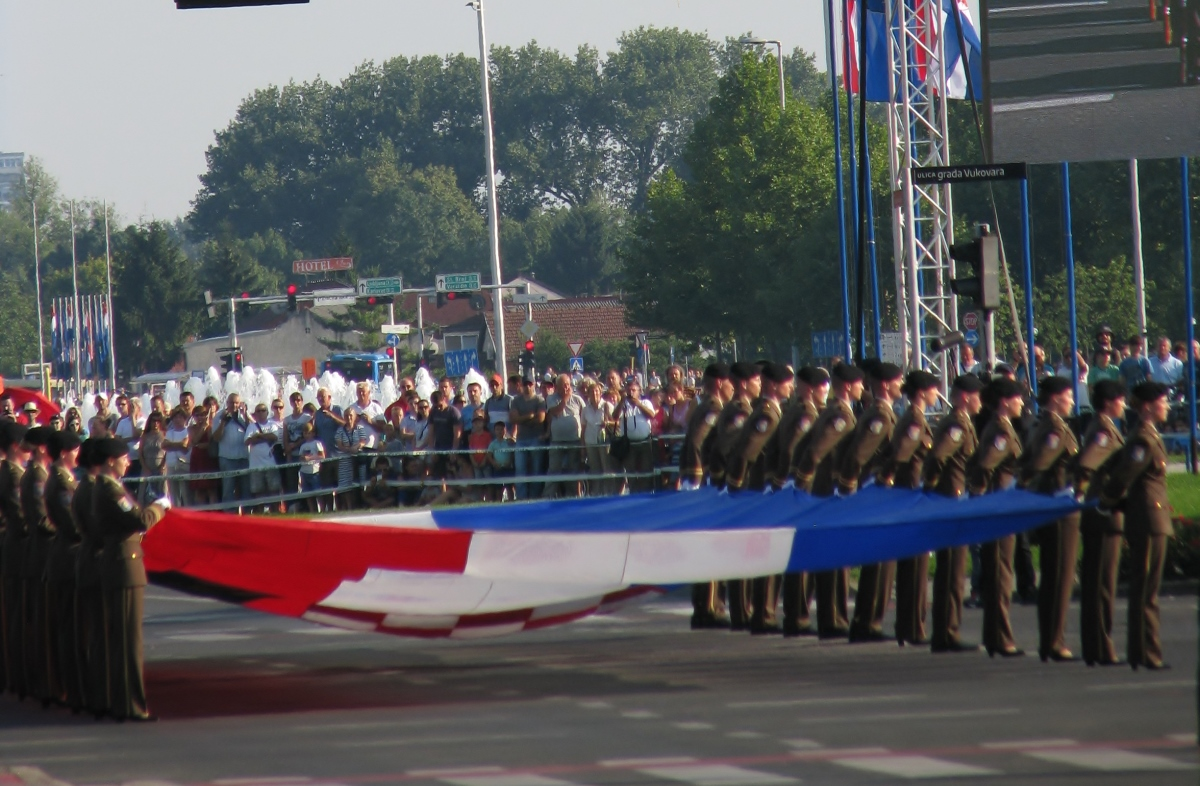
2015 military parade of the Croatian Armed Forces in honour of the Victory Day

The 2011 Croatian parliamentary election was held on 4 December 2011, and the Kukuriku coalition won. Zoran Milanović became the prime minister of the coalition government.

In January 2012, the new government organized a referendum for EU membership that passed with 66.27%. After the referendum, the Sabor ratified the accession treaty, the Treaty of Accession 2011.

The Milanović cabinet endured a major change when the first deputy prime minister Radimir Čačić resigned in November 2012, having been convicted of vehicular manslaughter in Hungary.

In the Trial of Gotovina et al, following an initial guilty verdict in April 2011, Ante Gotovina and Mladen Markač were ultimately acquitted in November 2012. Mirjan Damaška, a law professor at the University of Yale stated for the occasion that the theory about the "joint criminal enterprise" would have caused historical, political and law complications for Croatia, but that, as a result of the appeal, Croatia's founding has been internationally recognized as legal via its Operation Storm offensive.

Following the successful ratification of its accession treaty in all existing EU member states, Croatia joined the European Union on 1 July 2013.

Shortly after joining the European union a question of extradition of Josip Perković arose. A member of Yugoslavian secret service UDBA, Germany accused Perković of murder of a Croat citizen Stjepan Đureković ( who is suspected to have stolen 200 million dollars from INA petrol company and has subsequently fled to Germany). At first Croatia was unwilling to extradite Perković under the justification that its constitution prohibited it ( all political crimes fall barred after 2002 ). However, when threatened with sanctions in case of non compliance, the parliament quickly voted to change the constitution to allow the extradition. Finally, the law is to come into effect on January the first 2014.

On December the first 2013, Croatia held its third referendum since becoming independent. The referendum question was Do you define marriage as a union between a man and a woman, 65% of Croats voted yes, however, with a significantly low turnout of only 38% of eligible voters. The referendum was organized by the ultra-conservative group "In the name of family"'. The Catholic Church urged people to vote yes, while the government, 88 civil society organizations and local celebrities advised citizens to vote no. The referendum has raised much controversy and increase of violence against LGBT people in Croatian for this and following years. Same-sex registered partnership was introduced the following year, granting same-sex couples equal rights to marriage, except the LGBT adoption.

The sixth presidential election since independence took place in 2014 and 2015, with a first round held on 28 December 2014 between four candidates: the incumbent Ivo Josipović in office since 2010 and supported by the ruling coalition, former foreign minister and NATO official Kolinda Grabar-Kitarović nominated by the opposition HDZ, Živi zid activist Ivan Sinčić and right-wing populist Milan Kujundžić. Josipović and Grabar-Kitarović won the most votes, but fell short of the required 50% + 1 vote needed to win outright and proceeded to the second round held on 11 January 2015. In the second round Kolinda Grabar-Kitarović was elected the first female president of Croatia, winning with 50,74% of the vote and receiving 32.509 votes more than Josipović, thus making the latter the first Croatian president not to succeed in being reelected to office and also resulting in the narrowest margin of victory in any presidential election to date in Croatia.

Late 2014 and first half of 2015 was also marked by prolonged Croatian War Veterans protest in Savska street, Zagreb, which reached its climax in May 2015 when veterans took the protest to St. Mark's Square. The protest had the impact on both 2014–15 presidential election, and 2016 Croatian parliamentary election, when Milanović's attempted dialogue with the protest leaders resulted in leaking of tapes that revealed him using foul language to describe the neighboring countries. This ultimately cost Milanović of losing the 2016 elections.

In 2015, after Hungary built a fence along its border with Serbia, over 17000 refugees crossed the border into Croatia. They are seeking an alternative route into the Schengen area, as part of the refugee crisis, with most refugees fleeing the Syrian and Iraqi civil wars. As the Croatian prime minister Zoran Milanović stated that Croatia could not become a "refugee camp" and that it had become overwhelmed by the number of refugees entering the country, it was decided that Croatia would stop registering them and that a certain number of refugees be let into Hungary and Slovenia, attempts were made, however, by the authorities of those countries to obstruct the passage of refugees. The refugee crisis and immigration also, for the first time in Croatia's history, became a subject of political debate during the next Croatian parliamentary election in 2015.

In November 2015, the centre-right coalition, led by the Croatian Democratic Union (HDZ), won 59 seats while the ruling alliance, led by the Prime Minister Zoran Milanovic and his Social Democrats (SDP), won 56 seats in the parliamentary election. However, neither the ruling alliance nor the opposition got the parliamentary majority.

== Orešković government (2016) ==
In January 2016, Tihomir Orešković, a Canadian-educated economist and technocrat, became Croatian new prime minister. Five months after taking the office, Prime Minister Orešković lost a parliamentary confidence vote, meaning his government fell.

== Plenković government (2016–present) ==
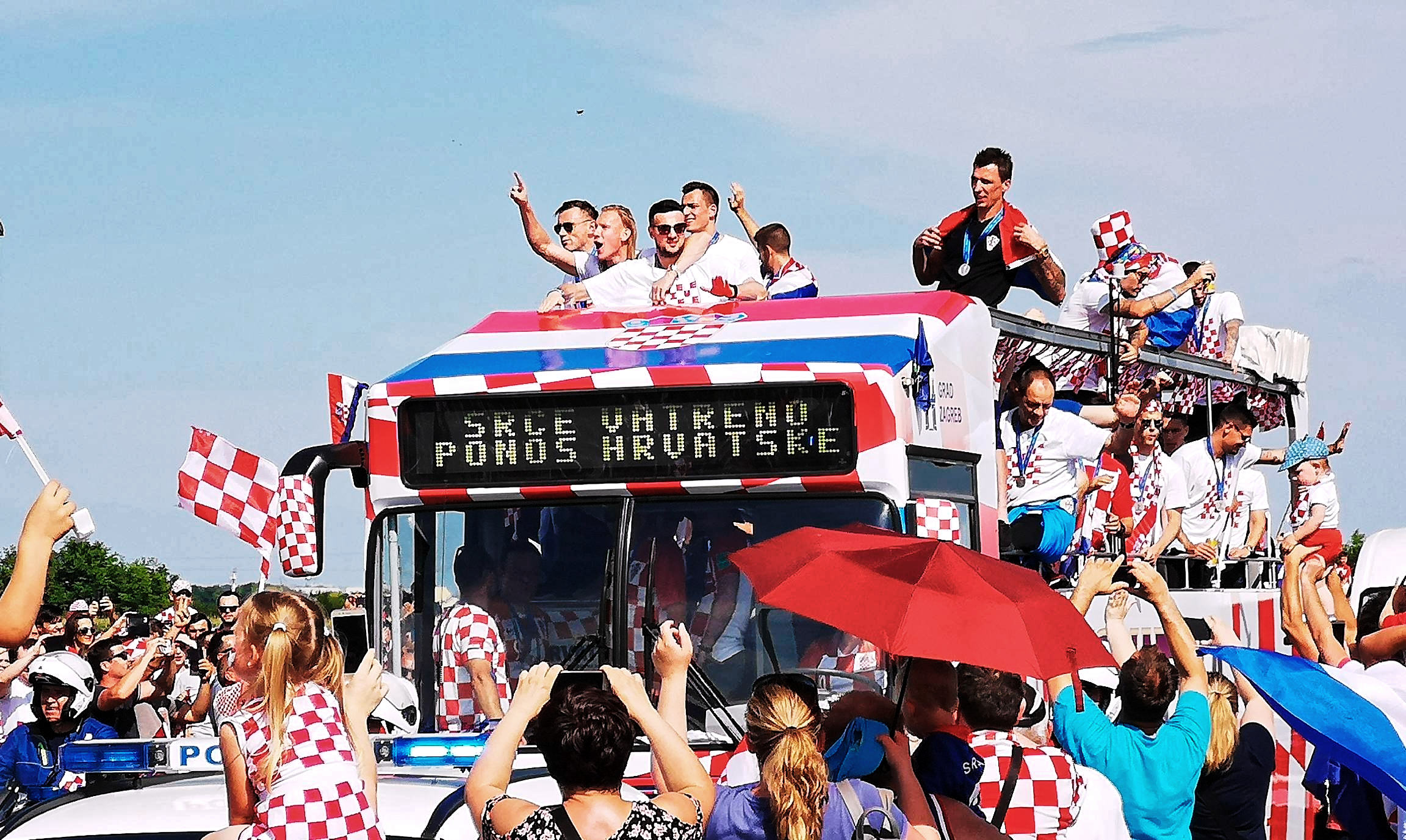
Celebrations in Zagreb after the Croatian national football team reached the 2018 FIFA World Cup final.

In September 2016, the Croatian Democratic Union (HDZ) won the early parliamentary election. However, they were still short of a majority in the 151-seat parliament. In October 2016, Croatian Democratic Union (HDZ) leader Andrej Plenković became new prime minister succeeding Tihomir Orešković. He formed a coalition with populist Most (Bridge of Independent Lists) and other small minority groups. In 2017 Agrokor - a largest Croatian private company fell into crisis with possibility of going bankrupt, so Croatian government intervened with a special law dubbed "Lex Agrokor" in order to salvage the company. In July 2018 Croatia national football team reached 2018 FIFA World Cup finals. In March 2020, Croatian capital Zagreb was rocked by 5.3 magnitude earthquake which caused significant damage to the city. In July 2020, the ruling centre-right party HDZ won the parliamentary election. On 12 October 2020 right wing extremist Danijel Bezuk attempted an attack on a Croatian government building and wounded a police officer in the process, after which he committed suicide.

In January 2020, former prime minister Zoran Milanović of the Social Democrats (SDP) won the presidential election. He defeated the first female President of Croatia, center-right incumbent Kolinda Grabar-Kitarović of the ruling Croatian Democratic Union (HDZ).

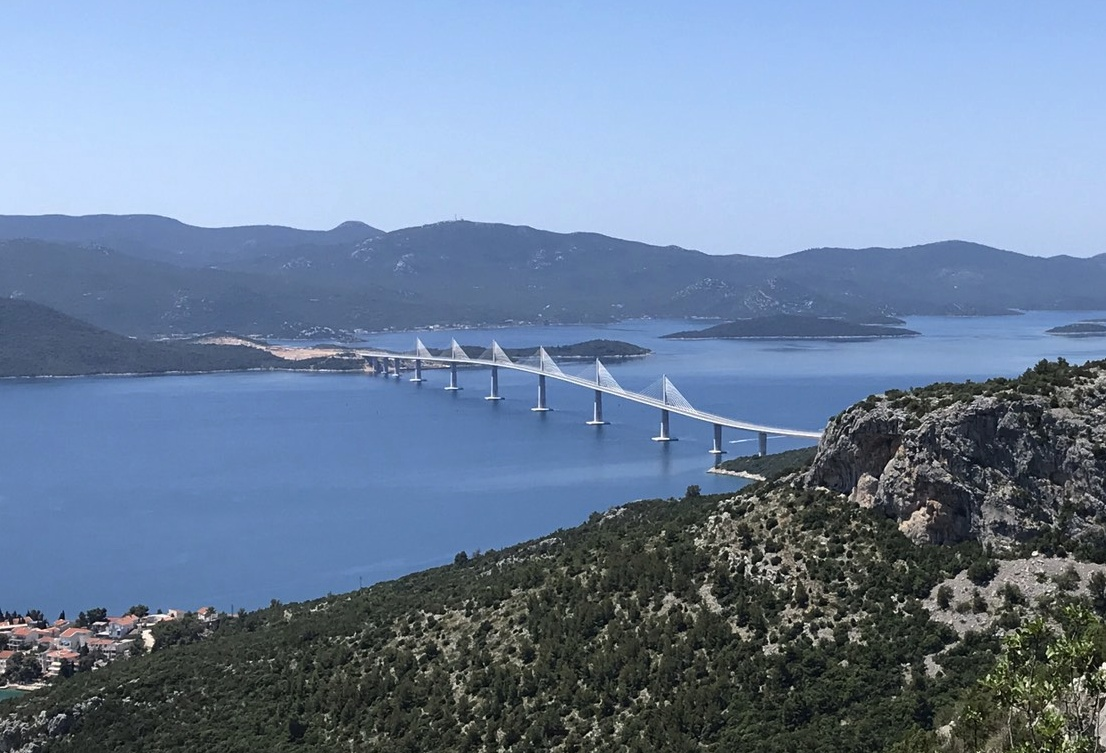
Pelješac Bridge in July 2022.

The centre-right governing party HDZ won the parliamentary election in July 2020, meaning incumbent Prime Minister Andrej Plenković would serve a second term. On 12 October 2020 right wing extremist Danijel Bezuk attempted an attack on building of Croatian government and wounded a police officer in the process, after which he committed suicide. In December 2020. Banovina, one of the less developed regions of Croatia was shaken by a 6.4 M earthquake which killed several people and completely destroyed the town of Petrinja. Throughout two and half years of global COVID-19 pandemic, 16,103 Croatian citizens died from the disease. In March 2022, a Soviet made Tu-141 drone crashed in Zagreb, most likely due to the 2022 Russian invasion of Ukraine. On 26 July 2022, Croatian authorities officially opened Pelješac Bridge, thus connecting southernmost part of Croatia with the rest of the country. In September 2022, Croatian Bureau of Statistics published the official results of 2021 population census, which showed that the number of people living in Croatia fell to 3,871,833 people, which is a 9.64 percent decrease in comparison with previous 2011 census. In late 2022 the Croatia national football team competed on 2022 FIFA World Cup in Qatar, where they ended up third. Upon their return to Croatia, they were again met by crowds of jubilant supporters in the capital Zagreb and elsewhere. On 1 January 2023 Croatia officially became a Eurozone member and entered the Schengen Area. In January 2025, Croatian president Zoran Milanovic was re-elected to a second term. On 30 November 2025, a series of anti-fascist marches were held across Croatia in response to the surge of far-right and World War 2 revisionism.
