= Zagreb School of Economics and Management =

Croatian business school

Coordinates: 45.8273°N 15.9964°E

- Zagrebačka škola ekonomije i managementa
- Type: Private, non profit
- Established: 2002
- Affiliations: AACSB, EDEN, EFMD
- Dean: Mato Njavro, PhD
- Faculty: 150
- Students: 1000
- Location: Zagreb, Croatia
- Campus: Urban
- Website: www.zsem.hr

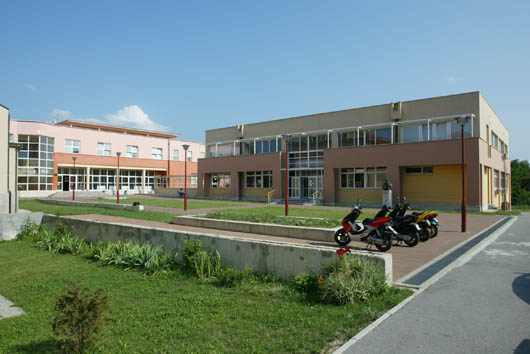
ZŠEM's Library and Administration Buildings.

The Zagreb School of Economics and Management (Croatian: Zagrebačka škola ekonomije i managementa, abbreviated as ZŠEM) is a private business school located in Zagreb, Croatia. Founded in 2002, ZŠEM provides undergraduate and graduate education in economics, management, finance, marketing, and accounting.

ZŠEM has been voted the best business school in Croatia for five consecutive years, most recently in 2012, and is Croatia's largest private institution of higher education. In 2013, the Zagreb School of Economics and Management became the first business school in Croatia to receive AACSB accreditation.

== Overview ==
ZŠEM was founded in 2002, making it one of the first private institutions of higher education founded in Croatia. It offers undergraduate degrees in economics and management, with a possibility of specialization in economics, management, finance, marketing, and accounting. ZŠEM also maintains a graduate program, offering MBAs in management, marketing, human resource management, and others, along with a Master of Arts in Economics program.

It operates one of the largest Summer Schools in Croatia. Due to ZSEM's extensive ties with other business schools and universities, 14% of its Summer School's enrollments are international students. 17% of ZSEM's students spend at least one semester abroad at one of 120 partner institutions and universities around the world.

== Academics and faculty ==
ZŠEM's undergraduate and graduate programs are in full compliance with the Bologna Process; its undergraduate program is assigned 240 ECTS points, or 8 full semesters, while its MBA and Master of Arts in Economics degrees are assigned 60 and 120 ECTS points, respectively. It is fully accredited and recognized by the Croatian Ministry of Science, Education and Sport.

ZŠEM enrolls 200 students annually. With 450 applicants for undergraduate admission, ZŠEM's acceptance rate is just under 45%. 55% of ZŠEM's students are from Zagreb and 20% are international students; roughly half of these are from Bosnia and Herzegovina.

Guest lecturers at ZŠEM have included marketing expert Philip Kotler, Indian microfinance entrepreneur Vijay Mahajan, presentation and communication expert Jerry Weissman, among others. ZŠEM also hosts an annual conference on corporate governance and social responsibility in Croatia.

Current and former faculty include several notable lecturers, such as former Croatian Prime Minister and current Croatian Olympic Committee Chairman Zlatko Mateša, former Croatian Finance Minister Martina Dalić, Croatia's first Minister for European integration Ljerka Mintas-Hodak, and others. Its Dean is a former economic advisor to the President of Croatia, MP, and former Dean of the Croatian Institute of Economics, Dr. Đuro Njavro.

== Rankings and achievements ==
Eduniversal voted ZŠEM the best business school in Croatia in 2008, 2009, 2010, 2011, 2012, 2013, 2014, 2015 and 2016; it holds four palms (the maximum being five) under Eduniversal's ranking system of business schools. Four palms of excellence ranking makes it the top business school with significant international influence.

In 2017 The Zagreb School of Economics and Management was recently the third best business school in Eastern Europe at the Eduniversal World Convention held in Dubai.

A study by the Croatian newspaper Jutarnji List concluded that ZŠEM received the most applications for admission annually of all Croatian private business schools and private degree granting institutions.

Notable Croatian business daily Business.hr recognized ZŠEM's Student Future Day as Croatia's leading career fair. At present, more than 94% of ZSEM students find employment within one year of graduating while 40% of students find internship during their years of study.

== Publishing ==
One of ZŠEM's founding members was Zagreb publishing house MATE, which specializes in business and economic publications. As such, ZŠEM has published, in cooperation with MATE, numerous management, economics, marketing and accounting textbooks and specialized publications. ZŠEM also publishes ZŠEM Management Review, Croatia's only business and economics quarterly, with scholarly articles published under exclusive license.

ZŠEM maintains extensive relations with other international business schools.
