= Janko Vranyczany-Dobrinović =

Croatian politician (1920–2015)

Baron Janko Vranyczany-Dobrinović GOKDZ

1st Permanent Representative of Croatia to the European Union
- In office 26 November 1996 – 23 January 2001
- President: Franjo Tuđman Stjepan Mesić
- Preceded by: Office established
- Succeeded by: Vladimir Drobnjak

President of the Office of Croatia for Contacts with the European Union and NATO
- In office 26 April 1991 – 26 November 1996
- President: Franjo Tuđman
- Preceded by: Office established
- Succeeded by: Office abolished

Minister of Tourism
- In office 25 July 1990 – 17 July 1991
- President: Franjo Tuđman
- Prime Minister: Josip Manolić
- Preceded by: Office established
- Succeeded by: Anton Marčelo Popović

Personal details
- Born: 27 May 1920 Bedekovčina, Kingdom of Serbs, Croats and Slovenes
- Died: 6 May 2015 (aged 95) Brussels, Belgium
- Party: Croatian Democratic Union
- Spouse: Maria Eva Vranyczany-Dobrinović (1978–2015; his death)
- Children: 1
- Awards: Grand Order of King Dmitar Zvonimir (1995)

Military service
- Allegiance: Independent State of Croatia
- Branch/service: Home Guard
- Years of service: 1941–45
- Battles/wars: World War II

Janko Baron Vranyczany-Dobrinović (27 May 1920 – 6 May 2015) was a Croatian nobleman, politician and diplomat. He served as the first Minister of Tourism of Croatia between 1990 and 1991. Afterwards, he was named President of the Office of Croatia for Contacts with the European Union and NATO in 1991, and was appointed the first Permanent Representative of Croatia to the European Union after the office was established in 1996. He was removed from the post in a widespread turnaround of Croatian diplomats, initiated by the centre-left government of Ivica Račan.

== Youth ==
Janko Vranyzcany was born in a castle in Bedekovčina near Krapina to Wanda Maria Ida "Dédée" (née von Schmidt Zabierow) and Ambroz Vranyczany-Dobrinović. His family was of noble origin which escaped Bosnia during the Ottoman conquest in 15th century. After spending his youth in Bedekovčina, Janko Vranyczany-Dobrinović went to Rome for studies. In 1937, he moved to Brussels to learn French, and remained there until 1938.

After the start of the World War II in Yugoslavia in April 1941, the Independent State of Croatia (NDH) was soon established on the territory of the occupied Yugoslavia on 10 April 1941. Vranyczany-Dobrinović was recruited to the Croatian Home Guard, and as an officer candidate was sent to the officers' school in Stockerau in Germany. He attended the school together with Velimir Pavelić, son of the leader of NDH, Ante Pavelić. After his return, he was supposed to join the Ustaše. Since he didn't want to join them, General Ante Vokić named him his adjutant.

He witnessed the failed Lorković-Vokić plot to overthrow the Ustaše government led by Ante Pavelić in August 1944. Vokić ordered him to take vacation on 22 August 1944, and to report to General Vladimir Kren on 1 September. However, after his return from vacation, he found about the failed coup and arrest of the main conspirators, Mladen Lorković and Ante Vokić, among with many other officers. Both Lorković and Vokić were executed at the end of the war. Vokić intended for Vranyczany-Dobrinović to accompany Josip Torbar in his flight to inform the Allies about the successful outcome of the coup.

== Emigration ==
After the end of the war, he moved to Rome again, where he got a degree in communications at the Vatican. The communist government in Yugoslavia confiscated the property of his family. After the death of his father, his mother remarried an American, who wanted to adopt him. While awaiting papers to move to the United States, Vranyczany-Dobrinović moved to Brussels in 1948, and worked for the Austrian Tourist Office as a tourist representative. In the meantime, his stepfather died as well, so Vranyczany-Dobrinović remained in Belgium.

In 1952, after working for the tourist office, Vranyczany-Dobrinović turned to entrepreneurship and imported hop for Belgian breweries, among them Stella Artois. During that time, he lived for two years in Dijon France. However, in 1968, he was again employed in the Austrian Tourist Office, but this time as a general director.

== Diplomatic career ==
With democratic changes happening in the republics of Yugoslavia, Vranyczany-Dobrinović was able to return to Croatia after nearly 45 years abroad. He joined the Croatian Democratic Union. He served as minister of tourism from 1990 to 1992 in Croatia's first democratically elected government. From 1991 he served as the head of Croatia's permanent mission to the European Union in Brussels. During his tenure as Permanent Representative to the EU, Zoran Milanović, future Prime Minister of Croatia, and Tomislav Sunić, a Croatian-American White nationalist, served under him. In 2000 he was removed from the post as part of a widespread turnaround of Croatian foreign diplomats. In 2004, he represented the Croatian president at the beatification of Austria-Hungary's final emperor, Charles I.

== Awards ==
- Grand Order of King Dmitar Zvonimir (1995)

== Ancestry ==
Ancestors of Janko Vranyczany-Dobrinović

16. Šimun Vranyczany-Dobrinović
8. Zanetto Johann Anton Vranyczany-Dobrinović
17. Rakela Vranyczany-Dobrinović
4. Viktor Vranyczany-Dobrinović
9. Anna Schwarze
2. Ambroz Vranyczany-Dobrinović
20. Willhelm Hellenbach de Paczolay
10. Lázár Hellenbach de Paczolay
21. Marija Adamović Čepinska
5. Zdenka Hellenbach de Paczolay
22. Dragutin Karlo Vinko Jelačić Bužimski
11. Klotilda Jelačić Bužimska
23. Franjica Sermage de Szomszédvár et Medvedgrád
1. Janko Vranyczany-Dobrinović
6. Arthur von Schmidt Zabierow
3. Wanda Maria Ida von Schmidt Zabierow
