= Ivan Milas =

Croatian lawyer and politician

Minister of Justice
- In office 6 June 1992 – 12 August 1992
- Prime Minister: Franjo Gregurić
- Preceded by: Bosiljko Mišetić
- Succeeded by: Ivica Crnić

Keeper of the State Seal
- In office 6 May 1995 – 1 February 2000
- Preceded by: Post created
- Succeeded by: None

Deputy Prime Minister of Croatia
- In office 27 August 1992 – 3 April 1993
- Prime Minister: Hrvoje Šarinić
- Preceded by: Milan Ramljak
- Succeeded by: Ivica Kostović

Personal details
- Born: 18 October 1939 Zmijavci, Kingdom of Yugoslavia (modern Croatia)
- Died: 29 July 2011 (aged 71) Zmijavci, Croatia
- Party: Croatian Democratic Union
- Education: University of Zagreb

Ivan Milas (18 October 1939 – 29 July 2011) was a Croatian lawyer and politician.

Milas was born in the village of Zmijavci near Imotski in Zagora, and graduated from the Faculty of Law at the University of Zagreb.

Milas was close to Marko Veselica and was active in the Croatian Spring in the early 1970s. In 1972, the authorities of communist Yugoslavia charged Milas with "actions against the state", arrested and spent six months in jail awaiting trial. He was released to prepare his defense, and subsequently fled to Austria where he received the status of a refugee. Yugoslavia sought his apprehension, which Austrian courts denied. He was tried in absentia in Yugoslavia and received a two-and-a-half-year prison sentence.

In 1988 Milas met the Croatian historian and politician Franjo Tuđman and in August 1989 joined his newly formed Croatian Democratic Union. Milas received a passport to return to Croatia in February 1990 and was elected to the Croatian Parliament in its first democratic elections.

During the first phase of the Croatian War of Independence between the summer of 1991 and the spring of 1992, Milas served as the Deputy Minister of Defence and Deputy Minister of Justice.

Milas was reelected in the 1992 election, and served as the Minister of Justice from 6 June to 12 August 1992 and was later vice-president in the Croatian Government, under Hrvoje Šarinić.

On 28 May 1995, President Tuđman awarded him with the Grand Order of King Dmitar Zvonimir. Also in May 1995, the function of the Keeper of the State Seal (Croatian: Čuvar državnog pečata) was created, and President Tuđman named Milas to the position on 6 May 1995, where he remained until 1 February 2000. As of 2019 no other person was named to the position after Milas. Milas was elected to Sabor again in the October 1995 election.

Between 1996 and 2000 Milas was a member of the Council of the Croatian National Bank.

He was last elected to the Croatian Parliament in the 2000 Croatian parliamentary election, where he served until late 2003, when he retired from politics.

Milas gained considerable notoriety in the Croatian public after he publicly expressed his opinion that in the West, brain is valued in kilograms.

Ivan Milas died in Zmijavci at the age of 72.

Government offices
Preceded by Bosiljko Mišetić	Croatian Minister of Justice; 6 June 1992–12 August 1992	Succeeded by Ivica Crnić
