= Milena Žic-Fuchs =

Croatian linguist (born 1954)

Milena Žic Fuchs
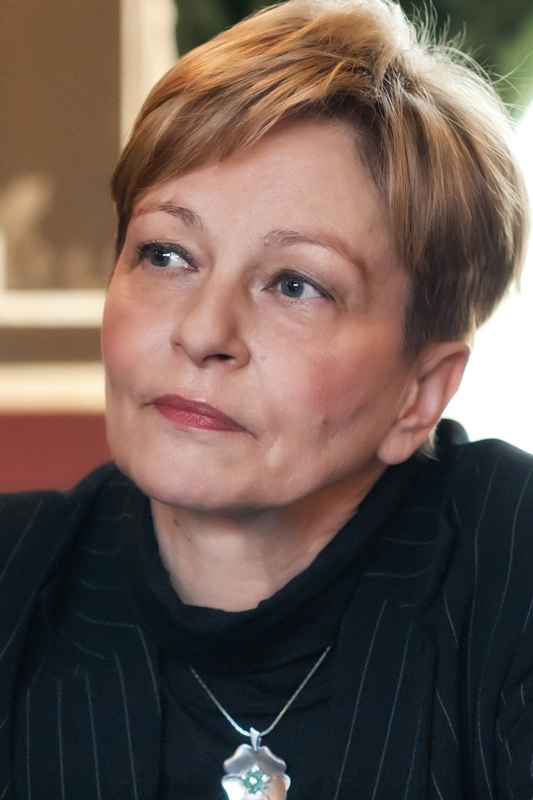
- Žic Fuchs in 2013

Minister of Science and Technology
- In office 22 February 1999 – 27 January 2000
- Prime Minister: Zlatko Mateša
- Preceded by: Ivica Kostović
- Succeeded by: Hrvoje Kraljević

Personal details
- Born: 10 August 1954 (age 72) Zagreb, PR Croatia, FPR Yugoslavia
- Party: Non-party
- Education: University of Zagreb (Faculty of Humanities and Social Sciences)

Milena Žic Fuchs (Croatian pronunciation: [milena ʒit͡s fuks]; born 10 August 1954) is a Croatian linguist and full member of the Croatian Academy of Sciences and Arts. She formerly served as the Croatian Minister of Science and Technology in the cabinet of Zlatko Mateša from February 1999 to January 2000.

== Education and career ==
Žic Fuchs graduated from the University of Zagreb's Faculty of Humanities and Social Sciences (FFZG) in 1977, majoring in English language and literature and ethnology. In 1982 she received an MA in linguistics and in 1989 a PhD, also in linguistics. She worked at the faculty since the late 1970s in various lecturing roles. From 2002 to 2011 she was Chair of Linguistics at the Department of English.

== Memberships ==
In May 2002 she became associate member of the Croatian Academy of Sciences and Arts (HAZU) and in May 2010 she was made full member of HAZU.

In January 2009 she was appointed to a 3-year term as Chair of the Standing Committee for the Humanities with the European Science Foundation.

She is credited with introducing cognitive linguistics into the Croatian linguistic community with her 1991 book Knowledge of Language and Knowledge of the World (Croatian: Znanje o jeziku i znanje o svijetu).

In 2013 Milena Žic Fuchs was elected member of Academia Europaea.

From 2014 she is an active member of the HERCULES Group (Higher Education Research and Culture in European Society) within Academia Europaea. In 2016 Milena Žic Fuchs was a member of the EC High Level Group for the Interim Evaluation of H2020 on European Research Infrastructures, including e-Infrastructures. Also, in 2016 she was appointed member of the EC High Level Group on Maximising Impact of EU Research and Innovation Programmes, chaired by Professor Emeritus Pascal Lamy.

Since 2020 she is member of the ERC Scientific Council.

== Awards ==
In 2023, Žic Fuchs was awarded the honorary title professor emerita of the University of Zagreb and the Lifetime Achievement Award at the Faculty of Humanities and Social Sciences.
