= Ljerka Mintas-Hodak =

Croatian politician (born 1952)

Minister of European Integration
- In office 3 April 1998 – 27 January 2000
- Prime Minister: Zlatko Mateša
- Preceded by: Position established
- Succeeded by: Ivan Jakovčić

Deputy Prime Minister of Croatia
- In office 7 November 1995 – 27 January 2000
- Prime Minister: Zlatko Mateša
- Preceded by: Bosiljko Mišetić
- Succeeded by: Goran Granić

Personal details
- Born: 26 January 1952 (age 74) Zagreb, PR Croatia, FPR Yugoslavia (modern Croatia)
- Spouse: Zvonimir Hodak

Ljerka Mintas-Hodak (born 26 January 1952) is a Croatian politician and jurist who served as a Deputy Prime Minister of Croatia, and first Minister of European Integration. Mintas-Hodak co-founded the Zagreb School of Economics and Management and after she retired from government service, she became manager of the Law Department. She also manages the Ivana Hodak Foundation that was created in honor of here late daughter.

== Biography ==
Ljerka Mintas was born on 26 January 1952 in Zagreb, Yugoslavia (now Croatia) to Vladimir, an apprentice, and Draga, a kindergarten teacher. She attended Elementary school Jabukovac and Classical Gymnasium in Zagreb. Mintas was a participant of Croatian Spring and served in the chairmanship of a Croatian Students' Union, where she worked in the field of international relations. After the end of the Croatian Spring, she was framed by State Security Administration for an apparent assault on a college professor, for which she served a two-month sentence between 1972 and 1973 in a correctional facility in Vukomerec. The prison time left a significant impact on Mintas, who would meet with other participants of Croatian Spring, including Bruno Bušić.

In 1975, she graduated with a law degree from the University of Zagreb and began practicing law. In 1980, she began a research post at the Croatian Academy of Arts and Sciences and earned a Master of Science degree. In 1981, she married attorney Zvonimir Hodak and they subsequently had one child. While continuing her work as a research assistant, Mintas-Hodak earned her doctorate in Maritime Law in 1989 from the University of Zagreb. In 1991 she became one of the inaugural members of the Croatian Maritime Law Association, serving as its first vice president.

That same year, Mintas-Hodak joined the Croatian Social Liberal Party (Croatian: Hrvatska socijalno liberalna stranka) (HSLS) and became an advisor on maritime law to the office of President Franjo Tuđman. Within four months, she was appointed to head the European Community Monitoring Mission of Croatia. In 1992, she changed parties, joining the Croatian Democratic Union (Croatian: Hrvatska demokratska zajednica (HDZ) and was made assistant minister of Maritime Affairs, Transport and Communications. In 1995, she joined the government of Prime Minister Zlatko Mateša as Deputy Prime Minister for Internal and Social Affairs. In July 1995, Mintas-Hodak formally entered HDZ. When the government created a Ministry for European Integration in 1998, Mintas-Hodak was appointed the first Minister of European Integration and within a year, her ministry had developed a plan to facilitate membership in the European Union. Among her concerns were human rights violations within Croatia, but the plan also encompassed requirements from the EU on voting rights and transparency, treatment of refugees and minorities, economic reforms, legal reforms, and cooperation with the tribunal on-going at the Hague for the former-Yugoslavia. The final document, Plan of Integration Activities was edited by Mintas-Hodak. From 2000 to 2003 she served as a Member of Parliament. Mintas-Hodak subsequently left the HDZ because of her disagreements with policies of party's then-president, Ivo Sanader, whom she would later criticize because of his lack of success in solving party's internal disagreements.

In the 2017 Zagreb local elections Mintas-Hodak was elected member of the Zagreb City Assembly as a candidate of Milan Bandić's party list.

During her time in government, Mintas-Hodak published numerous papers on maritime law prior to 1996 and with a government reshuffle in 2002, she planned her retirement. That year, she helped found the Zagreb School of Economics and Management (Croatian: Zagrebačka škola ekonomije i managementa (ZŠEM). She left government service in 2003 and became a lecturer at ZŠEM. She also returned to writing and published two textbooks.

In 2008, Mintas-Hodak's only child, Ivana, was murdered. Mintas-Hodak established the humanitarian Ivana Hodak Foundation, in her daughter's memory to provide educational scholarships in law or economics for young people. In addition, she has assisted African orphans in Burundi, Congo, Kenya, Rwanda, and Uganda.

== Sources ==
- Bartlett, William (2004). Croatia: Between Europe and the Balkans. London: Routledge. ISBN 978-1-134-47891-0.
