= Nenad Porges =

Croatian politician (born 1946)

Minister of Economy, Labour and Entrepreneurship
- In office 15 April 1997 – 27 January 2000
- Prime Minister: Zlatko Mateša
- Preceded by: Davor Štern
- Succeeded by: Goranko Fižulić

Personal details
- Born: 27 December 1946 (age 79) Zagreb, PR Croatia, FPR Yugoslavia (modern Croatia)
- Party: Independent
- Education: University of Zagreb

Nenad Porges (born 27 December 1946 in Zagreb, Croatia) is a Croatian politician, businessman, entrepreneur and former Minister of Economy, Labour and Entrepreneurship.

== Background and education ==
Porges was born in Zagreb to a Jewish family who came to Zagreb from Vienna and Bratislava. His paternal grandparents were killed during the Holocaust by the SS Prinz Eugen Division, while his father's life was spared due to a fact that he was an essential worker for the Third Reich. Porges received his degrees from the University of Zagreb (a bachelor's degree in economics and a master's degree in marketing) and was a lecturer in marketing and management in postgraduate studies at the Faculty of Economics of the University of Zagreb. He was the president of the Jewish community of Zagreb until 1993, when he retired from the position. Porges remains a member, though inactive, of the Jewish community in Zagreb.

== Political and business career ==
As a president of the Jewish community Zagreb, Porges was a strong advocate of Croatian independence. He directed a letter to the World Jewish Congress and all affiliated Jewish organizations and institutions with the title; "Appeal to our Jewish brothers and sisters". In the letter he appealed for the recognition of Croatia and support in the Croatian War for Independence which was fought "against a brutal military force led by the Yugoslav Army". He served as adviser to the prime minister for two years. Prior to his post as adviser to the prime minister, Porges served as Deputy Minister of Economy, Labour and Entrepreneurship. In 1997 he became the Minister of Economy, Labour and Entrepreneurship in the Croatian Government. He has also worked on a number of marketing research projects and published numerous papers. In 2005 Porges was named among the one thousand most influential Croatians. After Croatian independence Porges helped to revive Freemasonry in the country.

Political offices
Preceded by Davor Štern	Minister of Economy; 1997–2000	Succeeded by Goranko Fižulić
