= Ivica Kostović =

Croatian politician and physician

Minister of Science and Technology
- In office 7 November 1995 – 14 October 1998
- Prime Minister: Zlatko Mateša
- Preceded by: Branko Jeren
- Succeeded by: Milena Žic-Fuchs

Chief of Staff of the Office of the President of Croatia
- In office 1998 – January 2000
- President: Franjo Tuđman
- Preceded by: Hrvoje Šarinić
- Succeeded by: Željko Dobranović

Deputy Prime Minister of Croatia
- In office 12 October 1993 – 14 October 1998
- Prime Minister: Nikica Valentić; Zlatko Mateša
- Preceded by: Ivan Milas
- Succeeded by: Slavko Linić

Personal details
- Born: 7 June 1943 (age 83) Zagreb, SR Croatia, Democratic Federal Yugoslavia (modern Croatia)
- Party: Croatian Democratic Union
- Education: University of Zagreb (School of Medicine)

Ivica Kostović (born 7 June 1943) is a Croatian politician and physician.

== Academic career ==
He was born in Zagreb. After receiving a degree in medicine in 1967 at the University of Zagreb, he worked in the Institute for Anatomy Drago Perović at the School of Medicine, where he founded and headed the Department of Neuroanatomy in 1987. He also founded the Croatian Institute for Brain Research in 1990, where he established the Department of Neuroscience. He has served as the director of the institute since 2000.

He is a professor of the Zagreb School of Medicine, also serving as the dean of faculty in the period 1992–93. He teaches as a professor at the University of Amsterdam. He has published a number of discoveries in the field of neurobiology and developmental neuroanatomy of the cerebral cortex. He was the head of the Information Department at the Ministry of Health (1991-1993), deputy prime minister for social affairs (1993–95) and of humanitarian affairs (1995–98). In 1995–98 he served as the minister of science and technology, and in 1998–2000 he was the head the Office of the President. In the period 2000–03 he served as Deputy Speaker of the Croatian Parliament. He is a full member of the Croatian Academy of Sciences and Arts since 2006. He is a member of the Academia Europaea.

== Awards ==
He was awarded the National Award for Lifetime Achievement in 2010.

== See also ==
- Subplate
