= Anto Kovačević =

Croatian politician (1952–2020)

Member of Parliament
- In office 2 February 2000 – 22 December 2003
- Constituency: V electoral district

Personal details
- Born: 21 March 1952 Odžak, PR Bosnia and Herzegovina, FPR Yugoslavia
- Died: 14 November 2020 (aged 68) Zagreb, Croatia
- Party: Croatian Christian Democratic Union; Croatian Party of Rights
- Spouse: Stažija Kovačević
- Children: 2
- Education: University of Vienna
- Occupation: Philosopher; publicist; politician

Anto Kovačević (21 March 1952 – 14 November 2020) was a Croatian philosopher, publicist, and politician.

A native of Bosnia and Herzegovina, Kovačević earned a Ph.D. degree from the University of Vienna. He entered Croatian politics in the early 1990s as one of the most prominent members of the Croatian Christian Democratic Union (HKDU). He was an outspoken critic of Franjo Tuđman and his handling of the war in Bosnia and Herzegovina. As a member of the opposition alliance that included the left-wing Social Democratic Party of Croatia (SDP), he entered the Croatian Parliament in 1995.

As the rule of Franjo Tuđman neared its end, Kovačević, as well as his party, began to distance itself from Croatian political centre and shift to hardline nationalist right, embodied in their new partners Croatian Party of Rights (HSP).

During the 2005 presidential election, Kovačević ran as HKDU candidate, finishing 8th with 0.86% of the vote. He died from COVID-19 in Zagreb, on 15 November 2020, at age 68.
