= Ivan Cesar =

Croatian politician (1936–1993)

Ivan Cesar (9 May 1936 – 26 November 1993) was a Croatian politician.

In 1990 he was the founder and the leader of Croatian Christian Democratic Party (HKDS).

In the 1992 presidential elections in Croatia he ran as a candidate, finishing 7th. This, and failure of HKDS to enter Croatian Parliament led to HKDS uniting with Croatian Democratic Party (HDS) into a new party called the Croatian Christian Democratic Union.
