= Davor Štern =

Croatian politician

Minister of Economy
- In office 7 November 1995 – 14 April 1997
- Prime Minister: Zlatko Mateša
- Preceded by: Zlatko Mateša
- Succeeded by: Nenad Porges

Personal details
- Born: 18 June 1947 (age 79) Zagreb, PR Croatia, FPR Yugoslavia (modern Croatia)
- Party: Croatian Social Liberal Party (2006–2010)
- Education: University of Zagreb

Davor Štern (born 18 June 1947 in Zagreb, Yugoslavia) is a former Minister of Economy, Labour and Entrepreneurship in the Croatian Government, businessman and entrepreneur.

== Background and education ==
Štern was born in Zagreb on 18 June 1947. His father was a Hungarian Jew and his mother was from Šestanovac, Croatia. Štern himself was raised Jewish. He is fluent in English, Russian, Italian, German, Hebrew and Croatian. He graduated in 1967 at the University of Zagreb (faculty of Petroleum, Geology and Mining). Štern is a member of the Jewish community in Zagreb.

== Career ==
After graduation, in 1972 he worked for INA and in 1973 he was hired by Yugoslav oil pipeline. From 1976 until 1982 he worked as director of imports in INA – Commerce. In 1982 he was appointed as a branch director of INA in Moscow, he worked in that position until 1986. From 1986 until 1991 he worked as director of Philipp Brothers – Salomon Brothers representative office in Moscow. He worked as a branch director of Glencore from 1991 until 1993. From 1993 until 1994 he worked as director of Trade Consulting in Graz, Austria. He was a Deputy Minister of Economy from 1994 until 1995, when he was appointed as a Minister of Economy. He held that office until 1997. In 1997 he became a general manager of INA – Oil Industry d.d. and he remained on that position until 2000. In 2001 he returned to Moscow as advisor to a president of TNK-BP. He remained there until 2004 and since then he has been a director of Zagreb Trade Consulting Company. On 21 October 2010 Štern was named a member of INA supervisory board.

Štern is one of the Croatia's wealthiest people, with estimated net worth of €43 million according to the list from 2007.

Štern also serves as Honorary Consul General of the Philippines in Croatia.

== Philanthropy ==
Štern is known for his philanthropy. He always preferred anonymous donations over those that are visible to the public.

Political offices
Preceded by Zlatko Mateša	Minister of Economy; 1995–1997	Succeeded by Nenad Porges
