= Ševko Omerbašić =

Croatian imam (1945–2024)

Effendi Ševko Omerbašić
- Title: Mufti

Personal life
- Born: 9 June 1945 Ustikolina, Democratic Bosnia and Herzegovina, DF Yugoslavia
- Died: 31 October 2024 (aged 79)
- Home town: Zagreb, Croatia
- Notable work(s): Islam and Muslims in Croatia; Historical and Current Overview of Islam and Muslims in Croatia; The Prophet and His People; Tafsir of Qur'an; Akaid Ši'ita; Theology of Shias

Religious life
- Religion: Islam
- Denomination: Sunni Islam
- School: Hanafi

Muslim leader
- Based in: Zagreb, Croatia
- Successor: Aziz Hasanović
- Previous post: President of the Islamic Community in Croatia and Slovenia

Ševko Omerbašić (9 June 1945 – 31 October 2024) was a Croatian imam who was president of the Islamic Community in Croatia and Slovenia.

== Biography ==
Omerbašić was born in Ustikolina, near Foča, Yugoslavia, presently in Bosnia and Herzegovina. He finished elementary school in his birthplace and went to Sarajevo where he entered high school, the Gazi Husrev Bey's Madrasa which he attended from 1956 until 1964. After he finished high school education, he worked as an imam in Rudo, and then he returned to Ustikolina also as imam.

Soon after he enlisted into the Yugoslav Army, and after that he went to be educated in Libya at the Islamic University of Libya where he studied Islam and Arabic. He returned to Yugoslavia in 1975 and was appointed imam of Zagreb. In 1988 he became chief mufti of the Islamic Communities in Croatia and Slovenia. In 1990 when the Seniority of the Islamic Community of Croatia and Slovenia was founded, Omerbašić was named its president and thus he got the title "mufti".

He taught for five years at the Jesuit Faculty of Philosophy of Society at the University of Zagreb; for ten years he taught the history of Islam, interpretation of the Qur'an, Arabic language and Islamic studies at Zagreb's Dr. Ahmed Smajlović Madrasa. Omerbašić attended two years of religious pedagogy at Catechetical Institute of the Catholic Theological Faculty in Zagreb.

In the 2017 Zagreb local elections Omberbašić was elected member of the Zagreb City Assembly as a candidate of Milan Bandić's party list.

Omerbašić died on 30 October 2024, at the age of 79.

== Views ==
Omerbašić was known for inter-religious tolerance. As he was teaching, he introduced the practice of sending his students to Catholic mass. He was also an opponent of terrorism committed by Islamic extremists, explaining that such things occur because of misreading the Qur'an.
