= Croatian Christian Democratic Union =

Croatian Christian Democratic Union Hrvatska kršćanska demokratska unija
- Founder: Marko Veselica
- Founded: 20 December 1992
- Dissolved: 12 January 2007
- Headquarters: Ivana Tkalčića 4/1, Zagreb
- Ideology: Christian democracy National conservatism
- Political position: Right-wing
- Colours: Blue, red, white

Website
- www.hkdu.hr

The Croatian Christian Democratic Union (Croatian: Hrvatska kršćanska demokratska unija or HKDU) was a minor right-wing Christian-democratic political party in Croatia. It was founded in 1992 after the merger of Croatian Democratic Party (HDS) and the Croatian Christian Democratic Party (HKDS).

== Origins ==
The Croatian Christian Democratic Party (Hrvatska kršćanska demokratska stranka, HKDS) was created in 1990 and modelled after the Christian-democratic parties of Western Europe, although, due to specific circumstances of early 1990s Croatia, it had more right wing than centre-right rhetoric.

In the 1990 Croatian parliamentary election, it joined a bloc of moderate nationalists called the Coalition of People's Accord. Like all parties of that bloc, it fared badly, but one year later it held a ministerial post in the "National Unity" government of Franjo Gregurić. In the 1992 Croatian parliamentary election, HKDS, running on its own ticket, failed to enter Croatian Parliament, while its leader Ivan Cesar finished seventh in presidential race. This fiasco led HKDS to unite with Croatian Democratic Party (HDS). A dissident faction of the HKDS continued to operate under the party's old name.

The Croatian Democratic Party (Hrvatska demokratska stranka, HDS) was a right-wing party that was among the first to be founded after the arrival of multi-party democracy in Croatia. Led by veteran Communist-era dissident Marko Veselica, HDS was supposed to be the focal point for the most radical Croatian nationalists. This spot was, however, taken by Franjo Tuđman and his Croatian Democratic Union. Like the HKDS, the HDS instead joined the moderate Coalition of People's Accord and, consequently, fared badly in the 1990 Croatian parliamentary election.

After the 1990 election, HDS tried to live to its radical reputation by harshly criticising Tuđman's government for the perceived appeasement of Serbia and Yugoslav People's Army during the opening stages of the Croatian war. When the war escalated in the summer of 1991, HDS was nevertheless admitted into the "National Unity" government of Franjo Gregurić.

In less than a year, HDS lost its reputation as the most radical Croatian party to the Croatian Party of Rights. This was reflected on the 1992 presidential and parliamentary elections, which led HDS to merge with the Croatian Christian Democratic Party (HKDS).

== History ==
The Croatian Christian Democratic Union was represented in Croatian Parliament between 1995 and 2003:

- 3rd assembly (1995-1999) - one member of parliament
- 4th assembly (2000-2003) - one member of parliament

Long-time presidents of the party were Marko Veselica (1992-2001) and Anto Kovačević (2001-2007).

In 2007, party ceased to exist and majority of member decided to held a new "founding assembly" (osnivački sabor) and elected Željko Nuić as its new president, who criticized the former presidents Petar Ćurlin, Marko Veselica and Anto Kovačević as failures of the party.

== Electoral history ==
=== Legislative ===
| Election | In coalition with | Votes won (coalition totals) | Percentage | Seats won | Change |
|---|---|---|---|---|---|
| 1995 | HSS-IDS-HNS-SBHS | 441,390 | 18.26% | 1 / 127 | ▲1 |
| 2000 | HSP | 153,708 | 5.19% | 1 / 151 | Steady |
| 2003 | HČSP-HDSS | 24,632 | 0.99% | 0 / 151 | ▼1 |
