= Marko Veselica =

Croatian disident and economist (1936–2017)

Personal details
- Born: 9 January 1936 Glavice, Kingdom of Yugoslavia (modern Croatia)
- Died: 17 February 2017 (aged 81) Zagreb, Croatia
- Occupation: Politician; Economist; University professor

Marko Veselica (January 9, 1936 – February 17, 2017 in Zagreb) was a Croatian politician, economist and university professor.

During the Croatian Spring, Marko Veselica developed a reputation of being a Croatian nationalist. He was close to Ivan Milas. As a prominent Croatian dissident his Croatian nationalist views brought him into conflict with the Communist authorities of Yugoslavia. In 1981 he was arrested on suspicion of "antistate activities", charged with spreading hostile propaganda in interviews with Western news organizations and maintaining contacts with emigre groups, and after a seven-day trial sentenced by a Zagreb court to eleven years imprisonment. In 1983 he was an Amnesty International prisoner of conscience.

In 1990, he became leader of the newly formed Croatian Democratic Party (HDS). Following the merger of the HDS and the Croatian Christian Democratic Party (HKDS) he became chairman (1992–2001) of the Croatian Christian Democratic Union HKDU.

He died on 17 February 2017 at morning in Fran Mihaljević hospital in Zagreb.
