= Croatian Democratic Union =

Political party in Croatia

Croatian Democratic Union Hrvatska demokratska zajednica
- Abbreviation: HDZ
- President: Andrej Plenković
- Vice President: Tomo Medved
- Secretary General: Krunoslav Katičić
- Deputy Presidents: See list: Oleg Butković; Ivan Anušić; Branko Bačić; Zdravka Bušić
- Founder: Franjo Tuđman
- Founded: 17 June 1989; 37 years ago
- Headquarters: Trg žrtava fašizma 4, Zagreb
- Youth wing: Youth of the Croatian Democratic Union
- Membership (2023): 213,077
- Ideology: Conservatism; Christian democracy
- Political position: Centre-right to right-wing
- European affiliation: European People's Party
- European Parliament group: European People's Party Group
- International affiliation: Centrist Democrat International; International Democracy Union
- Colours: Blue
- Sabor: 56 / 151
- European Parliament: 6 / 12
- County Prefects: 14 / 21
- Mayors: 62 / 128
- Municipalities: 196 / 428

Party flag

Website
- hdz.hr

The Croatian Democratic Union (Croatian: Hrvatska demokratska zajednica, lit. 'Croatian Democratic Community', HDZ) is a major conservative, centre-right to right-wing political party in Croatia. Since 2016, it has been the ruling political party in Croatia under the incumbent Prime Minister Andrej Plenković. It is one of the two major contemporary political parties in Croatia, along with the centre-left Social Democratic Party (SDP). It is currently the largest party in the Sabor with 55 seats. The HDZ governed Croatia from 1990 before the country gained independence from Yugoslavia until 2000 and, in coalition with junior partners, from 2003 to 2011, and since 2016. HDZ is a member of the Centrist Democrat International, International Democracy Union, and the European People's Party, and sits in the European People's Party Group in the European Parliament. HDZ is the first political party in Croatia to be convicted of corruption.

== History ==
=== Origins ===
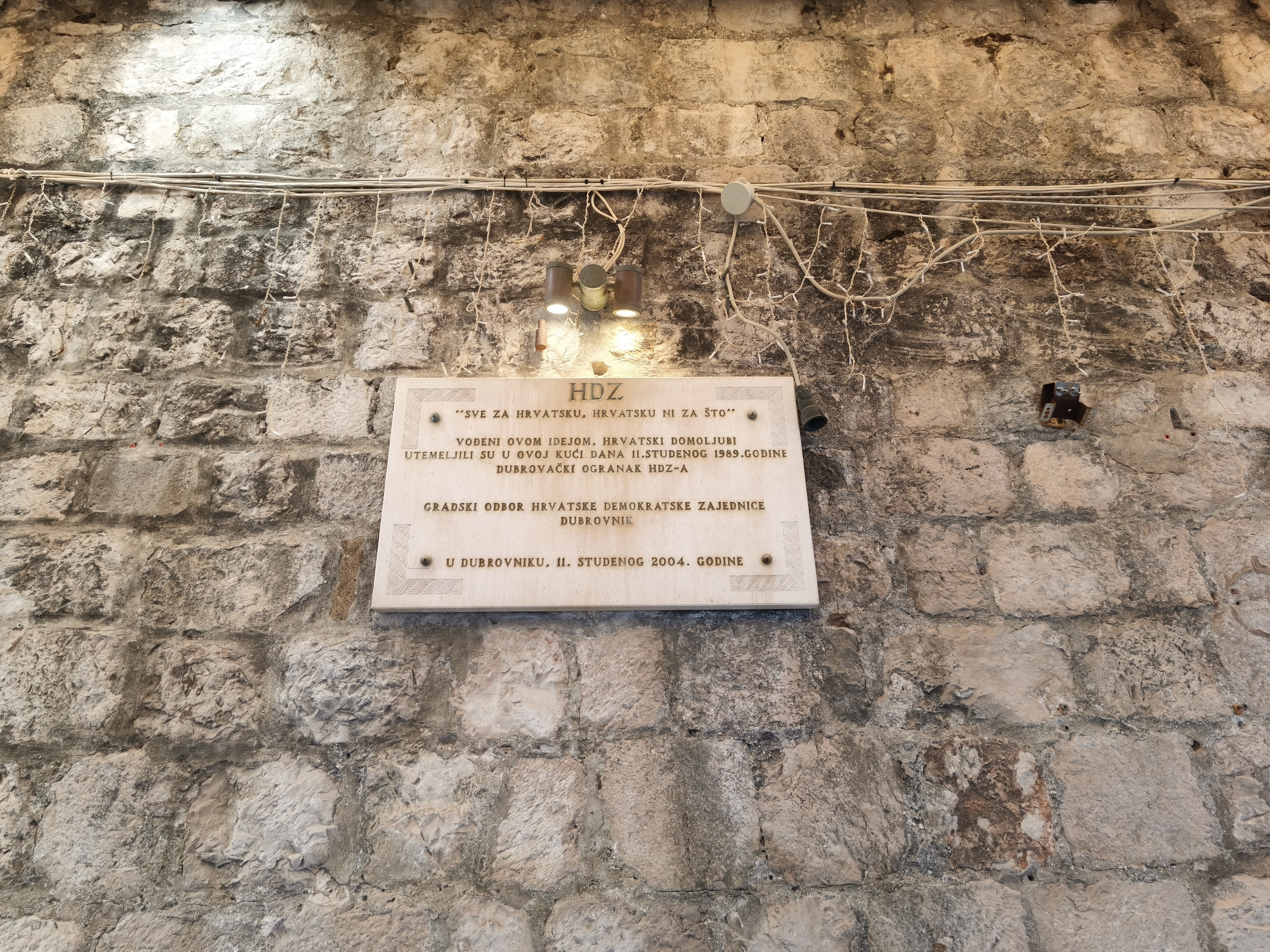
Plaque in Dubrovnik, dedicated to the establishment of the local branch of the Croatian Democratic Union

The HDZ was founded on 17 June 1989 by Croatian dissidents led by former major general Franjo Tuđman. It was officially registered on 25 January 1990. The HDZ held its first convention on 24–25 February 1990, when Franjo Tuđman was elected its president. When the party was founded, the government of the Socialist Republic of Croatia had just introduced a multi-party system in Croatia and scheduled elections for the Croatian Parliament.

The HDZ began as a nationalist party but also included former partisans and members of the Communist establishment, such as Josip Manolić and Josip Boljkovac. President Tuđman and other HDZ officials traveled abroad and gathered large financial contributions from Croatian expatriates. On the eve of the 1990 parliamentary elections, the ruling League of Communists of Croatia saw such tendencies within the HDZ as an opportunity to remain in power. At the beginning of democracy the communists called HDZ "the party of dangerous intentions". The HDZ won a majority in the Croatian Parliament, and Croatia (then part of Yugoslavia) became one of the few socialist countries where Communist single party rule was replaced by anti-Communist single party rule. 30 May 1990, the day the HDZ formally took power, was celebrated as Statehood Day.

=== 1990–2000 ===
Franjo Tuđman, former Croatian President and HDZ founder

A presidential election was held in 1992, and Tuđman, who would remain as undisputed party leader until his death in 1999, was elected president.

The party governed Croatia throughout the 1990s and under its leadership, Croatia became independent (1991), was internationally recognized (1992), and consolidated all of its pre-war territory (by 1998). During that period, the HDZ won both the 1992 and 1995 parliamentary elections.

As it strongly advocated Croatian independence, the HDZ was quite unpopular with the Serb minority and others who preferred to see Croatia remain inside the Socialist Federal Republic of Yugoslavia. This was one of the factors contributing to the creation of the Republic of Serbian Krajina and the subsequent armed conflict in neighboring Bosnia-Herzegovina. The role of the HDZ in those events is matter of controversy, even in Croatia, where some tend to view HDZ policy in the early stages of the conflict as extremist and a contributing factor in the escalation of violence while others (such as Marko Veselica's Croatian Democratic Party) see the HDZ as having appeased Serbia and the Yugoslav People's Army, therefore being responsible for Croatia's unpreparedness for defense. However, the policies of Tuđman and the HDZ shifted according to the circumstances.

=== Transition to capitalism ===
The HDZ also began to lead Croatia toward a political and economic transition from socialism to capitalism. Notably, HDZ governments implemented aggressive privatization in the country in a manner considered sub-optimal, and at times illegal, due to the selective nature of the privatizations (see Croatian privatization controversy). According to the HDZ, this process proved a useful distraction from dealing with the baggage of post-World War II communist nationalizations. It was the HDZ in 1992 which enacted into law the right of corporations (the vast majority of which were under state ownership) the right to finally formally register themselves as the owners of nationalized property, thus completing their version of a process of quasi-nationalization started by the communist regime after WWII, in different targeted areas for their gain. Although it was proven that HDZ sold a large number of state companies to people close to their party for greatly reduced prices. Property returned included possessions nationalized from the Catholic Church or widely known individuals such as Gavrilović, the owner of a major meat-producing factory in Petrinja, south of Zagreb.

=== HDZ after Tuđman's death (2000–2003) ===
The 2000 parliamentary elections were held 3 January, weeks after Tuđman's death. The HDZ was defeated by a centre-left coalition of six opposition parties, led by Ivica Račan's Social Democratic Party (SDP) and Dražen Budiša's Croatian Social Liberal Party (HSLS). The election was seen as a referendum on the HDZ with a poor economy, corruption and crony capitalism being major factors in their ouster.

At the subsequent presidential election, HDZ candidate Mate Granić who was favored to win in the weeks prior to the parliamentary elections, finished third and therefore failed to enter the second round of voting, won by Stipe Mesić.

In the period from 2000 and 2003, several businessmen who became tycoons under the initial HDZ rule were tried and convicted for abuses, though in general the privatization process implemented by the HDZ remained unaltered. This period proved to be a low point for the HDZ; many thought the party could not recover. These people included Mate Granić, who, together with Vesna Škare-Ožbolt, left to form the centre-right Democratic Centre (DC).

When the International Criminal Tribunal (ICTY) began to prosecute Croatian Army commanders, this provoked a major backlash among the Croatian public. As the opposition party, the HDZ supported this popular discontent and actively resisted the transfers of generals to the ICTY. This gradually changed as the HDZ and its new leader Ivo Sanader began to distance themselves from the more extreme rhetoric, becoming perceived as moderates. This tendency continued when the HSLS shifted rightwards, making Sanader's HDZ and HSLS appear as like-oriented parties. This process was completed in 2002 when Ivić Pašalić, leader of the HDZ hardliners and perceived to be associated with the worst excesses of Tuđman's era, challenged Sanader for the party leadership, accusing him of betraying Tuđman's nationalist legacy. At first it looked like Sanader would lose, but with the help of Branimir Glavaš and the tacit support of liberal sections of Croatian public opinion, he won at the party convention. Pašalić then left the HDZ to form the Croatian Bloc party.

=== First Sanader government (2003–2008) ===
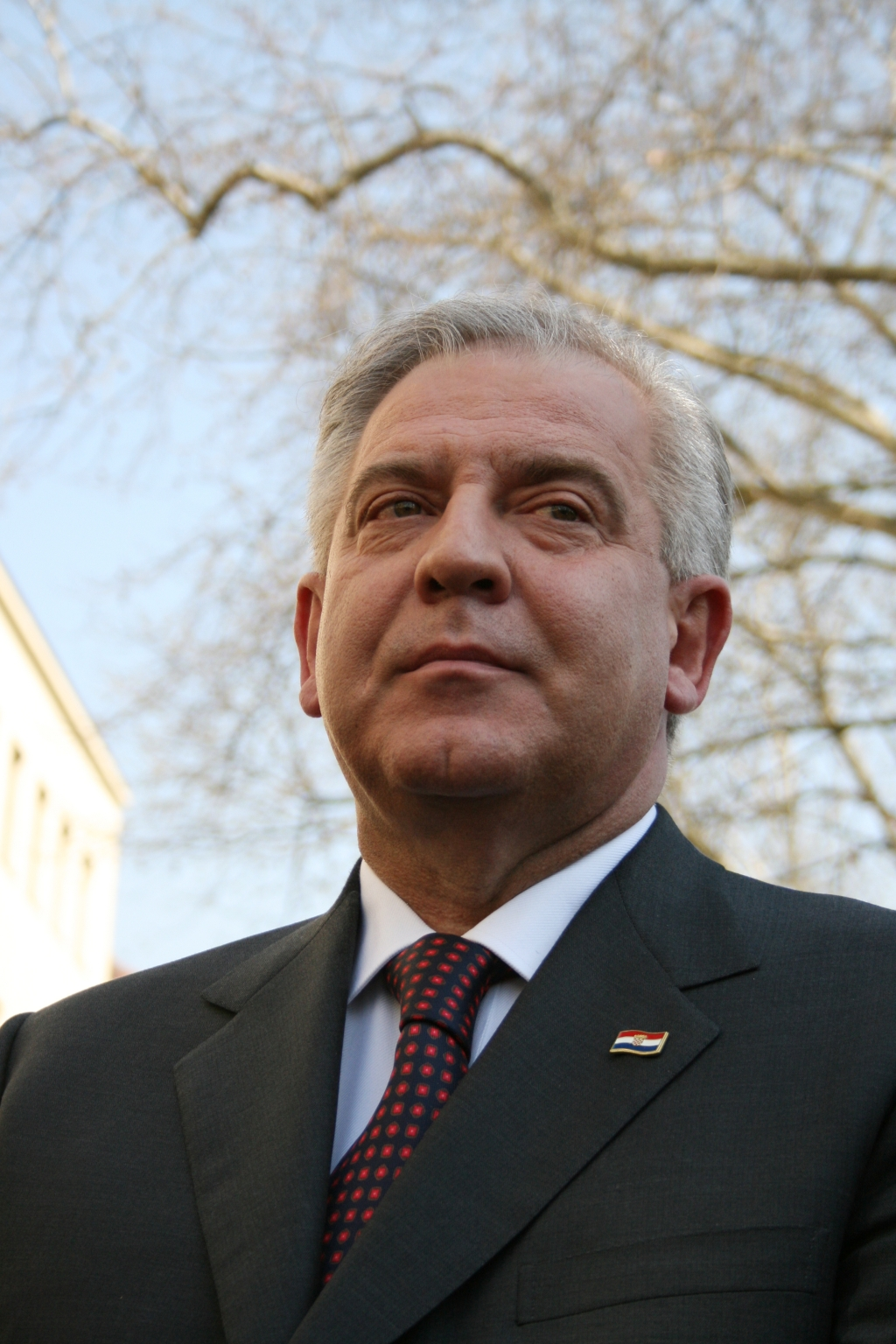
Ivo Sanader, president of the HDZ from 2000 to 2009; he was expelled from the party on 4 October 2010

At the 2003 Croatian parliamentary election, the party won 33.9% of the popular vote and 66 out of 152 seats. Although it failed to win a clear majority in the Croatian Parliament, even with the help of the allied DC and HSLS, it formed a government with the nominally left-wing Independent Democratic Serb Party and the Croatian Party of Pensioners.

With such a broad and diverse mandate, the Sanader-led government vigorously pursued policies that amounted to the implementation of the basic criteria for joining the European Union, such as the return of refugees to their homes, rebuilding houses damaged in the war, improving minority rights, cooperating with the ICTY, and continuing to consolidate the Croatian economy. Despite this, the EU's Council of Ministers postponed Croatia's membership negotiations with the union on the grounds of its non-cooperation with the International Criminal Tribunal for the former Yugoslavia over the case of indicted general Ante Gotovina.

This setback brought an increase in Eurosceptic views among the Croatian public, which also affected support for the HDZ. Since accession to the EU was a key part of Sanader's reformist course, opposition to his leadership within and outside the HDZ was on the rise. This opposition manifested itself at the 2005 local elections and the defection of Glavaš, who not only successfully challenged Sanader's authority but also managed to nominally deprive Sanader of his parliamentary majority.

=== Second Sanader government (2008–2009) ===
Despite this defeat, the first Sanader-led government was able to survive until the end of the legislature. The subsequent parliamentary election in late November 2007 saw the HDZ hard-pressed both by the SDP-led leftist coalition and by the extreme right-wing Croatian Party of Rights and Croatian Democratic Assembly of Slavonia and Baranja.

During the electoral campaign, a vigorous and sometimes ruthless reaction from the party and Sanader himself, together with some capital errors from SDP, convinced part of the far-right electorate to support the HDZ to prevent what they perceived as the heirs of the former communist party to return to power. The party won a majority of both seats and votes in the election, and the first session of the newly elected parliament was called for 11 January 2008. However, the SDP repeatedly refused to acknowledge defeat, claiming that they had the most votes if the diaspora ballot was not taken into account. The HDZ gained the support of the "yellow–green coalition" (HSS-HSLS) and of the HSU and national minorities representatives; Sanader formed a second government.

In the local elections held in May 2009, the HDZ, against all expectations, managed to grow again, coming ahead of the SDP. However, HDZ support did weaken in the larger cities.

On 1 July 2009, Ivo Sanader abruptly announced his resignation from politics and appointed Jadranka Kosor as his successor. She was confirmed as the new leader of the party on 3 July and was appointed by president Stipe Mesić as the prime minister-designate. Two days later the Sabor confirmed Kosor as the new prime minister, the first woman to hold the position.

In the same resignation speech, Sanader also appointed Andrija Hebrang, who had formerly held the posts of defence minister and health minister, as HDZ candidate for the incoming presidential election, decreasing any speculation about his own ambitions for that position.

The "Fimi media" was a corruption scandal which resulted from former Prime Minister Ivo Sanader stealing money from the state budget. USKOK has charged former Prime Minister Ivo Sanader, Fimi media CEO Nevenka Jurak, former treasurer of the Croatian Democratic Union Mladen Barišić, former spokesperson of the Croatian Democratic Union Ratko Maček and former chief accountant Branka Pavošević with damaging the state budget by 70 million kuna or approximately 9 million euros.

=== Government of Jadranka Kosor (2009–2011) ===
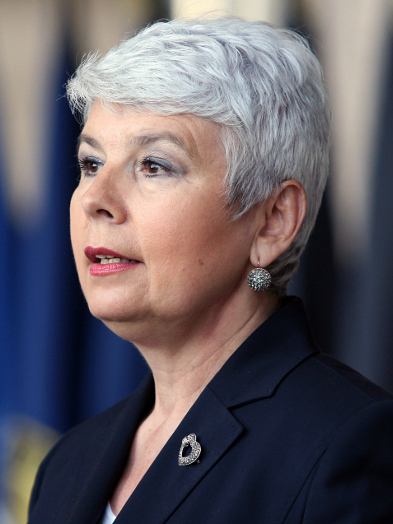
Jadranka Kosor, the first female Prime Minister of Croatia

The HDZ was faced with bad poll ratings and a large clean-up task that was still underway when Sanader left. The officials used the 2009 convention to elect Jadranka Kosor party president by acclamation. Andrija Hebrang accepted his designation as the presidential candidate only at the end of July, after he underwent a thorough medical examination, to exclude any remaining trace of a previous carcinoma.

The Kosor government remained mostly unchanged from the previous Sanader government, but the HDZ suffered some internal turmoil as ministers Berislav Rončević and Damir Polančec left their posts after allegations of corruption. Along with several anti-corruption investigations, the party had to deal with an economic crisis. It began tackling the issue in April 2010 with a recovery program.

In the next presidential elections, Croatia was looking for a replacement for Stipe Mesić who had held the position for ten years. But Hebrang finished third, failing to reach the second stage in which SDP candidate Ivo Josipović overwhelmingly defeated former SDP member Milan Bandić.

However, many Croatian people were dissatisfied with the government and protested on the streets against the HDZ government, demanding that new elections be held as soon as possible. The police placed a guard on St. Mark's Square to prevent civilians from entering.

From 26 October 2011 USKOK expanded its investigation about "Slush Funds" on the HDZ as a legal entity. Previously, the investigation had included only Ivo Sanader, treasurers Milan Barišić and Branka Pavošević, general secretaries Branko Vukelić and Ivan Jarnjak and spokesman Ratko Maček. Party president Jadranka Kosor stated that this was one of the most critical moments of the HDZ. The HDZ became the first political party in Croatia to be charged with corruption.

=== In the opposition (2011–2016) ===
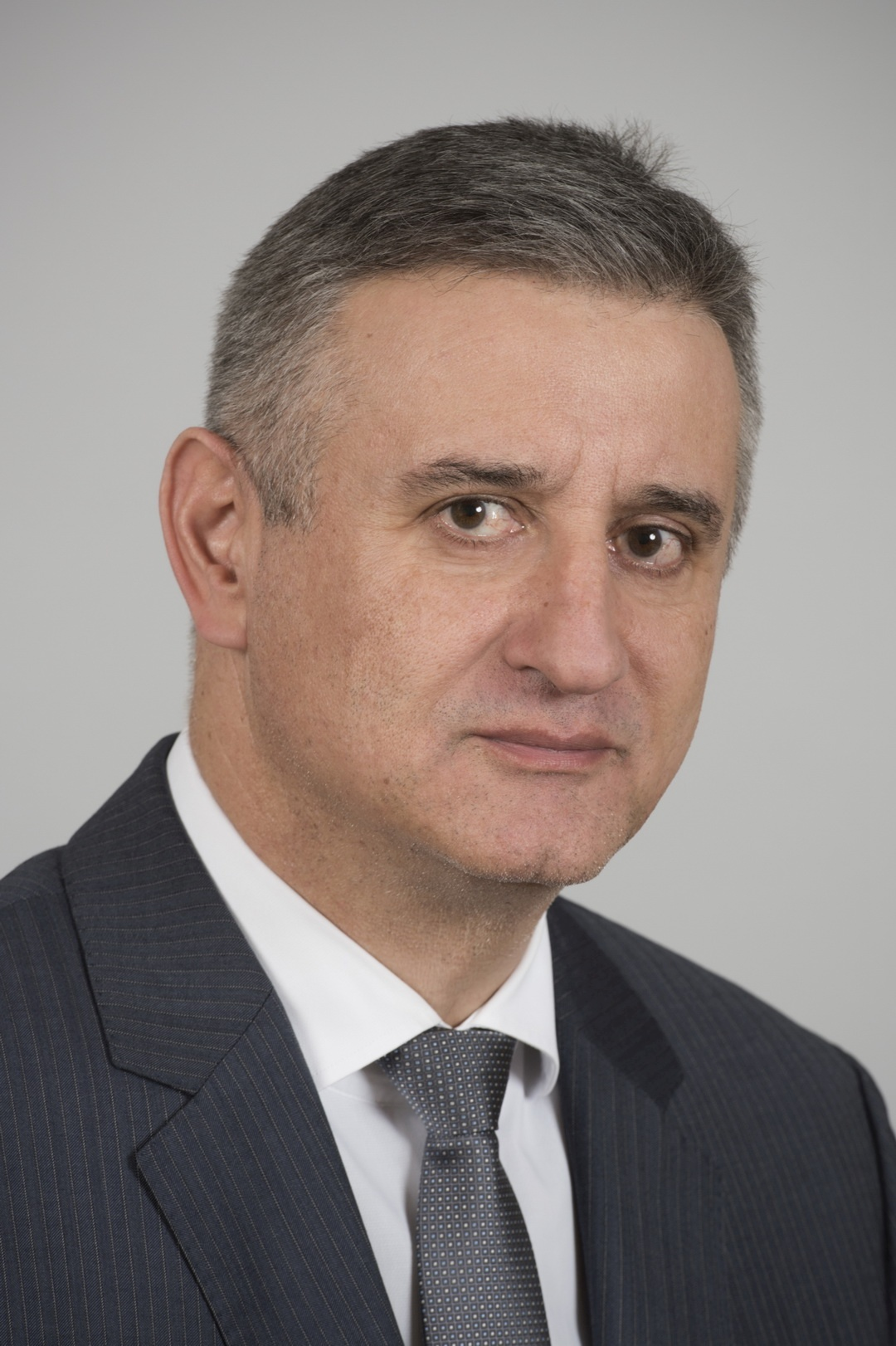
Tomislav Karamarko, president of the HDZ from 2012 until 2016

After the 2011 parliamentary elections, the HDZ became the opposition after 8 years in government. The HDZ won its smallest number of votes since its founding, 563,215.

On 20 May 2012, HDZ held a presidential election in which, a day later, Tomislav Karamarko become the winner and thus replaced Kosor as leader of the opposition. Karamarko announced that he would reestablish connections between Croatia and the Croatian diaspora.

Karamarko earlier announced that, after a process of the detudjmanization of the HDZ, he would return to the policies of Franjo Tuđman. He also stated that he could be "neither for Ante Pavelić nor Josip Broz Tito", as both of them represented totalitarian systems. On 1 July 2013, HDZ received full member status of the European People's Party (EPP). On 11 March 2014, the HDZ and Ivo Sanader were found guilty of corruption and were officially declared a criminal organization.

=== Plenković government (2016–present) ===
Following the collapse of the Tihomir Orešković government in June 2016, Tomislav Karamarko resigned as HDZ leader. The party elected former diplomat and member of the European Parliament Andrej Plenković as the new president, who won on a policy platform "devoid of extremes and populism". Plenković won the 2016 parliamentary election, in which he campaigned on a pro-European and moderate agenda. Plenković was appointed prime minister in October.

On 13 October 2021, the Supreme Court of the Republic of Croatia delivered a verdict in which the Croatian Democratic Union (HDZ) was convicted of corruption in the “Fimi Media” scandal. According to the ruling, the party siphoned off 14.6 million kuna from several public companies through fictitious invoices and transferred the funds into party slush funds. With this verdict, HDZ became the first political party in Croatia to be definitively convicted of corruption.

In March 2024, the organization GONG announced that the party had allegedly purchased “likes” on Facebook using automated fake profiles (so-called bots) in order to allegedly create the impression of greater public support for its activities.

== Ideology ==
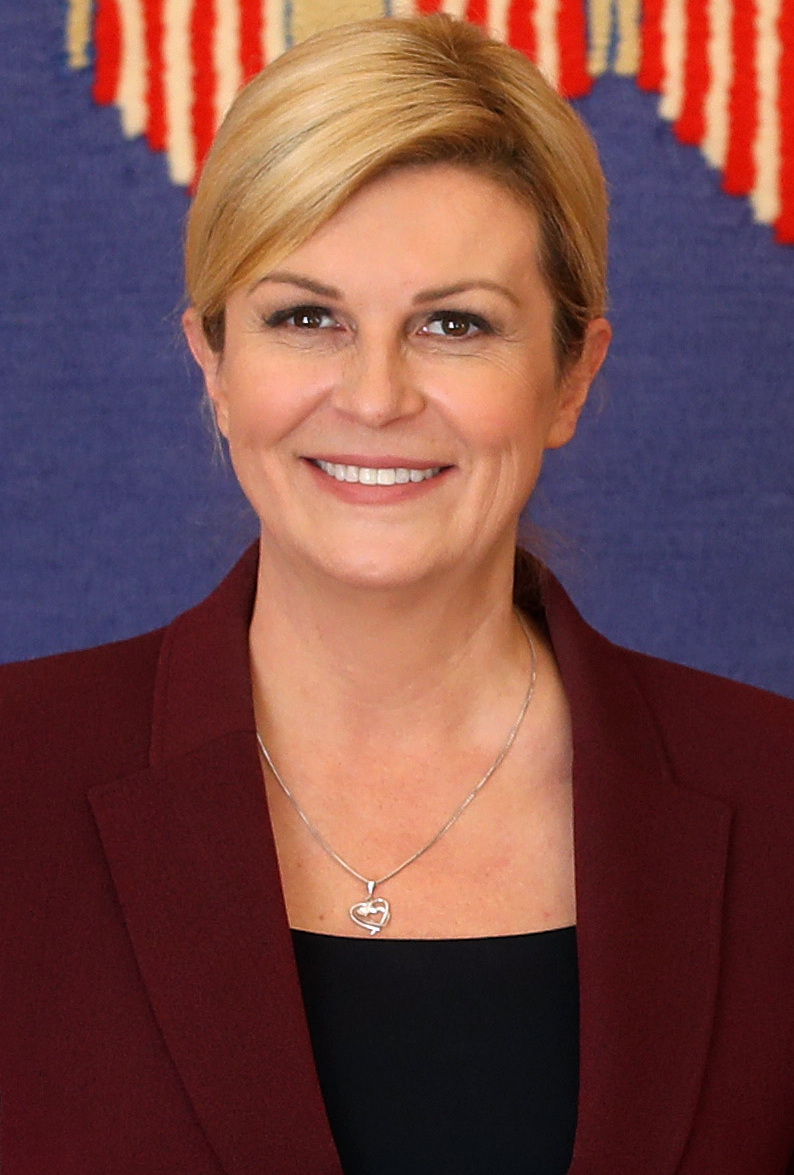
Kolinda Grabar-Kitarović, the first female President of Croatia who served from 15 February 2015 to 18 February 2020

In terms of ideology, the HDZ statute, as well as its President Andrej Plenković and Secretary Gordan Jandroković, define the political position of the party as centre-right. However, there have been significant shifts in HDZ's ideological and political positions, and there are both moderate and right-wing factions within the party with different interpretations of its basic positions.

The HDZ leaders during the 1990s described their party as centrist and Christian-democratic, although in practice they pursued ultranationalistic policies. However, the party was at the time mostly characterized as further to the right than in recent years.

At its beginning, the HDZ was an ethnically exclusive party that emphasized Croatian identity. Slogans such as "God and Croats" and "Croats get together" were common, which were incidentally also used by the leaders of the Ustaše-led Independent State of Croatia. Its discourse had a strong emotional appeal, evoking "fears, desires, material and symbolic benefits" to win over those who sought Croatian sovereignty over communism and drawing upon Croatian nationalist traditions. It did not recognize the plurality of identities when addressing its citizens, viewing them as "Catholic Croats" with anti-Serbian sentiments regularly appearing during its assemblies.

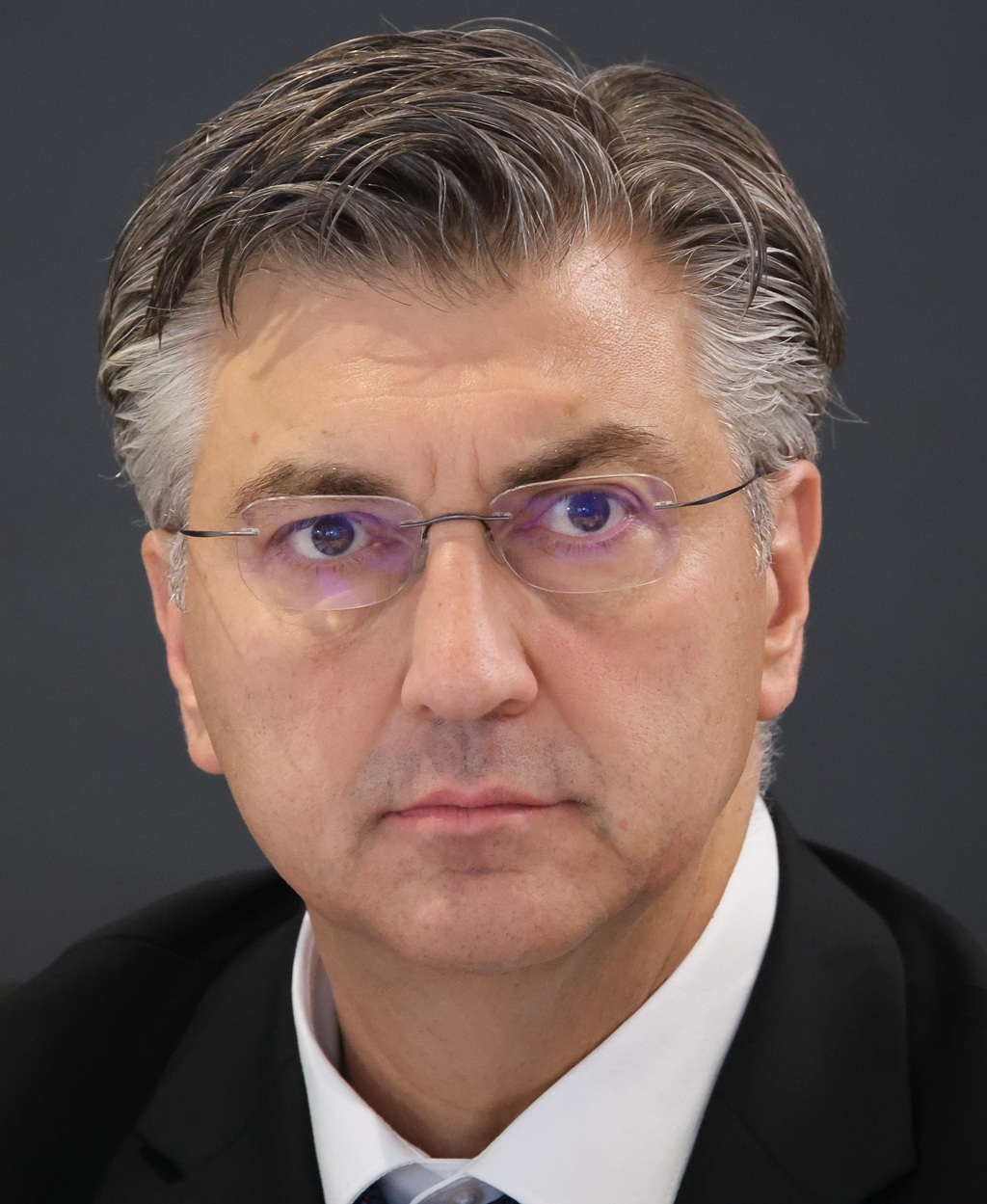
Andrej Plenković, president of the HDZ since 2016

The HDZ's position regarding the European Union was soft Eurosceptic: there was no explicit opposition to the accession of Croatia to the EU, but the HDZ opposed some EU policies. Following the election of Ivo Sanader as the party president in 2000, the HDZ adopted a moderate centre-right position. Under Sanader, the party strongly pursued a pro-European policy, which continued under the leadership of Jadranka Kosor. Many observers considered the leadership of Tomislav Karamarko from 2012 to 2016 as a return of nationalism in the party. After Andrej Plenković, viewed as a moderate, came to power in 2016, the party moved back to a centre-right position. The HDZ has been described as Christian-democratic and pro-European. The HDZ is responsible for implementing the "femicide" law, which criminalizes the killing of women, usually by men, because of their gender. This makes Croatia the third country in Europe to have "femicide" as part of its law.

== Election results ==
=== Legislative ===
The following is a summary of the party's results in legislative elections for the Croatian Parliament. The "Total votes" and "Percentage" columns include sums of votes won by pre-election coalitions HDZ had been part of. After the preferential votes were included in the election system, the votes column also includes the sum of votes for HDZ's candidates on the coalition lists. The "Total seats" column includes sums of seats won by HDZ in election constituencies plus representatives of ethnic minorities affiliated with HDZ.

| Election | Leader | Votes | % | Seats | +/– | Coalition | Government |
| Election | Leader | Coalition | | HDZ | | Coalition | Government |
|---|---|---|---|---|---|---|---|
| 1990 | Franjo Tuđman | 1,201,122 | 41.90 (#1) | 205 / 351 | Steady | None | Majority |
| 1992 | Franjo Tuđman | 1,176,437 | 44.68 (#1) | 85 / 138 | ▼120 | None | Majority |
| 1995 | Franjo Tuđman | 1,093,403 | 45.23 (#1) | 75 / 127 | ▼10 | None | Majority |
| 2000 | Zlatko Mateša | 790,728 | 26.88 (#2) | 46 / 151 | ▼29 | None | Opposition |
| 2003 | Ivo Sanader | 840,692 | 33.90 (#1) | 66 / 151 | ▲20 | None | Coalition |
| 2007 | Ivo Sanader | 907,743 | 36.60 (#1) | 66 / 153 | Steady | None | Coalition |
| 2011 | Jadranka Kosor | 563,215 | 23.50 (#2) | 44 / 151 | ▼22 | HGS–DC | Opposition |
| 2015 | Tomislav Karamarko | 771,070 | 33.46 (#1) | 51 / 151 | ▲7 | Patriotic Coalition | Coalition |
| 2016 | Andrej Plenković | 682,687 | 36.27 (#1) | 57 / 151 | ▲6 | HSLS–HDS–HRAST | Coalition |
| 2020 | Andrej Plenković | 621,035 | 37.26 (#1) | 62 / 151 | ▲5 | HSLS–HDS–HDSSB | Coalition |
| 2024 | Andrej Plenković | 729,949 | 34.44 (#1) | 55 / 151 | ▼7 | HSLS–HNS–HDS–HSU | Coalition |

=== Presidential ===
The following is a list of presidential candidates endorsed by HDZ in elections for President of Croatia.

| Election | Candidate | 1st round | | 2nd round | | Result |
| Election | Candidate | Votes | % | Votes | % | Result |
|---|---|---|---|---|---|---|
| 1992 | Franjo Tuđman | 1,519,100 | 56.73 (#1) | | | Won |
| 1997 | Franjo Tuđman | 1,337,990 | 61.41 (#1) | | | Won |
| 2000 | Mate Granić | 601,588 | 22.47 (#3) | | | Lost |
| 2005 | Jadranka Kosor | 452,218 | 20.31 (#2) | 751,692 | 34.07 (#2) | Lost |
| 2009–10 | Andrija Hebrang | 237,998 | 12.04 (#3) | | | Lost |
| 2014–15 | Kolinda Grabar-Kitarović | 665,379 | 37.22 (#2) | 1,114,945 | 50.74 (#1) | Won |
| 2019–20 | Kolinda Grabar-Kitarović | 507,628 | 26.65 (#2) | 929,707 | 47.34 (#2) | Lost |
| 2024–25 | Dragan Primorac | 314,663 | 19.59 (#2) | 380,752 | 25.32 (#2) | Lost |

=== European Parliament ===
| Election | List leader | Coalition | Votes | % | Seats | +/– | EP Group |
| Election | List leader | Coalition | Coalition | | HDZ | | EP Group |
|---|---|---|---|---|---|---|---|
| 2013 | Dubravka Šuica | HSP AS–BUZ | 243,654 | 32.86 (#1) | 5 / 12 | New | EPP |
| 2014 | Andrej Plenković | HSP AS–BUZ–HSS–HDS–ZDS | 381,844 | 41.42 (#1) | 4 / 11 | ▼1 | EPP |
| 2019 | Karlo Ressler | None | 244,076 | 22.72 (#1) | 4 / 12 | 0 | EPP |
| 2024 | Andrej Plenković | None | 264,415 | 35.13 (#1) | 6 / 12 | ▲2 | EPP |

== Party presidents since 1989 ==
The chart below shows a timeline of the Croatian Democratic Union presidents and the Prime Ministers of Croatia. The left bar shows all the president of the HDZ, and the right bar shows the corresponding make-up of the Croatian government at that time. The blue (HDZ) and red (SDP) colors correspond to which party led the government. The last names of the respective prime ministers are shown, the Roman numeral stands for the cabinets.

== See also ==
- Croatian Democratic Union of Bosnia and Herzegovina
- Elections in the Croatian Democratic Union
