= Zlatko Mateša =

Croatian politician

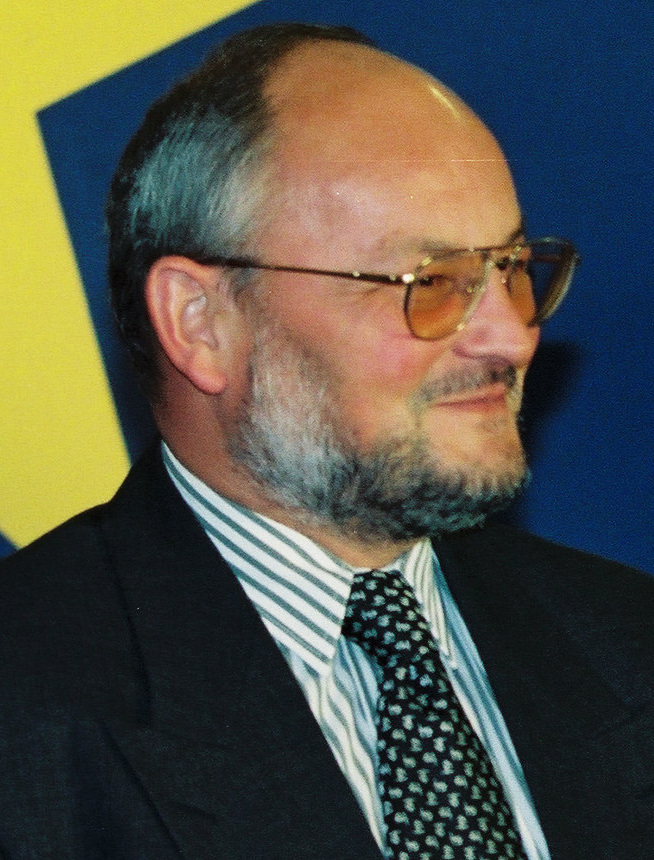
- Mateša in 1996

Prime Minister of Croatia
- In office 7 November 1995 – 27 January 2000
- President: Franjo Tuđman; Vlatko Pavletić (acting)
- Preceded by: Nikica Valentić
- Succeeded by: Ivica Račan

President of the Croatian Olympic Committee
- In office 2002–2026
- Preceded by: Zdravko Hebel
- Succeeded by: Josip Varvodić

Personal details
- Born: 17 June 1949 (age 77) Zagreb, PR Croatia, FPR Yugoslavia (modern Croatia)
- Party: Croatian Democratic Union
- Spouse: Blanka Mateša
- Education: University of Zagreb; Beijing Sport University

Zlatko Mateša (pronounced [zlâtko mâteʃa]; born 17 June 1949) is a Croatian politician who served as Prime Minister of Croatia from 1995 to 2000 and as . A member of the Croatian Democratic Union, Mateša who served as the president of the Croatian Olympic Committee from 2002 to 2026, and is honorary consul of Mongolia in Croatia.

Mateša was born and grew up in Zagreb, then Federal People's Republic of Yugoslavia, and obtained a law degree at the University of Zagreb in 1974. He worked in INA since 1978, where he rose through the ranks to the position of an assistant director. He was friends with Nikica Valentić, Mladen Vedriš and Franjo Gregurić.

In 1990, he entered politics and became a high-ranking HDZ member, along with the aforementioned group. President Franjo Tuđman named him the sixth President of the Government on 4 November 1995. The Mateša government is perhaps best remembered for the introduction of the value-added tax, which originated from the previous government before being put to effect from 1996 under Mateša's government. In 1998, the tax rate was fixed for all products at 22%. The finance minister in the Cabinet of Zlatko Mateša was Borislav Škegro.

In the 2000 Croatian parliamentary election he was elected into the Sabor and served until the end of 2003.

Since 2002, Mateša is the president of the Croatian Olympic Committee (HOO). In 2009, Mateša obtained a Ph.D. degree from Beijing Sport University.

== See also ==
- Cabinet of Zlatko Mateša
- Awards - In June 2018, Mateša Inducted into Power Brands LIFE – Hall of Fame at London International Forum for Equality

Political offices
Preceded by Nadan Vidošević	Minister of Economy; 1995	Succeeded by Davor Štern
Preceded by Nikica Valentić	Prime Minister of Croatia; 1995–2000	Succeeded by Ivica Račan
Sporting positions
Preceded by Zdravko Hebel	President of the Croatian Olympic Committee; 2002–2026	Succeeded by Josip Varvodić
Vacant
