= Timeline of Sarajevo =

Coordinates: 43.8476°N 18.3564°E

The following is a timeline of the history of the city of Sarajevo, Bosnia and Herzegovina.

== 15th–18th centuries ==
- 1457 - Emperor's Mosque built.
- 1463 - Settlements begin in Sarajevo.
- 1521 - Gazi Husrev-beg becomes sanjak-bey of Ottoman Bosnian Sanjak.
- 1530 - Gazi Husrev-beg Mosque built.
- 1531 - Madrasah of Sarajevo established.
- 1561 - Ali Pasha's Mosque built.
- 1697 - City sacked by Austrian forces.
- 1703 - Seat of Ottoman Bosnia Eyalet relocated from Sarajevo to Travnik.
- 1730 - Serbian Orthodox church rebuilt.
- 1739 - Fortress restored.
- 1766 - Magribija rebuilt.
- 1788 - Fire.
- 1791 - November: Flood.
- 1797 - Fire.
- 1798 - Latin Bridge rebuilt.

== 19th century ==
- 1813 - Plague.
- 1850 - Seat of Ottoman Bosnia Eyalet relocated to Sarajevo from Travnik.
- 1851 - Population: 21,102.
- 1867 - City becomes capital of the Ottoman Bosnia Vilayet.
- 1868 - Serb Orthodox Cathedral built.
- 1869 - Orphanage founded.
- 1878 - City becomes part the Condominium of Bosnia and Herzegovina of Austria-Hungary.
- 1879 - Fire.
- 1885 - Population: 26,377.
- 1888 - National Museum established.
- 1889 - Sacred Heart Cathedral built.
- 1893 - Mehmed-beg Kapetanović Ljubušak becomes mayor.
- 1894 - National Museum buys Sephardic Haggadah for its collection.
- 1895 - Population: 37,713.
- 1896 - Town Hall and National Library built.

== 20th century ==
- 1902 - Sarajevo Synagogue built.
- 1906 - Novibazar-Sarajevo railway begins operating.
- 1910 - Population: 51,919.
- 1912 - Kino Apolo (cinema) opens.
- 1913 - National Museum built.
- 1914
  - 28 June: Assassination of Archduke Franz Ferdinand of Austria.
  - 28–29 June: Anti-Serb pogrom in Sarajevo.
- 1915 - Kino Imperijal (cinema) opens.
- 1918 - City becomes part of the Kingdom of Serbs, Croats and Slovenes.
- 1921 - Population: 60,087.
- 1923 - Sarajevo Philharmonic Orchestra active.
- 1929 - City becomes seat of the Drina Banovina (province) of Yugoslavia.
- 1930 - Art gallery established.
- 1935 - Kino Tesla (cinema) opens.
- 1941 - German occupation begins.
- 1943 - Oslobođenje newspaper begins publication.
- 1945
  - April: German occupation ends.
  - State School of Painting, and Association of Artists of Bosnia and Herzegovina established.
- 1949 - University of Sarajevo and Museum of Sarajevo established.
- 1950 - Oriental Institute in Sarajevo established.
- 1953 - Population: 135,657.
- 1961 - Population: 213,092.
- 1969 - Skenderija (event centre) built.
- 1962 - June: Earthquake.
- 1972 - Academy of Arts opens.
- 1977 - Faculty of Islamic Theology established.
- 1981
  - Academy of Performing Arts in Sarajevo established.
  - Vraca Memorial Park opens.
  - Emerik Blum becomes mayor.
  - Population: 319,017.
- 1984
  - February: 1984 Winter Olympics.
  - Sarajevo Winter Festival begins.
- 1991 - Population: 361,735; canton 527,049.
- 1992
  - 5 April: Siege of Sarajevo begins.
  - 2–3 May: 1992 Yugoslav People's Army column incident in Sarajevo.
  - 17 May: Oriental Institute in Sarajevo destroyed.
  - Sarajevo War Theatre opens.
- BH Dani magazine begins publication.
- 1995
  - Canton of Sarajevo established per Dayton Agreement.
  - Dnevni avaz newspaper in publication.
  - Sarajevo Film Festival begins.
  - Mediacentar Sarajevo founded.
- 1996 - 29 February: Siege of Sarajevo ends.
- 1997 - Sarajevo Jazz Festival begins.
- 2000 - King Fahd Mosque inaugurated.

== 21st century ==
- 2001 - Istiqlal Mosque and Bosniak Institute established.
- 2002 - Population: 401,118.
- 2004
  - Center for Investigative Reporting headquartered in city.
  - Baitus Salam (mosque) built.
- 2005
  - Semiha Borovac becomes mayor (first female mayor).
  - East West Theatre Company founded.
- 2008
  - Avaz Twist Tower built.
  - Sarajevo City Center (commercial space) construction begins.
- 2009
  - Alija Behmen becomes mayor.
  - BBI Centar shopping mall in business.
- 2013
  - Ivo Komšić becomes mayor.
  - Population: 369,534; metro 515,012.
- 2014 - Gazi Husrev-Begova Library opens.
- 2014
  - April 2014: Sarajevo City Center opened early
  - April 2014: Miljacka River almost flooded the city
  - 9 May: Sarajevo National Library reopens.
- 2017
  - 6 February: Abdulah Skaka becomes mayor.
- 2019
  - Summer 2019 - Sarajevo flooded by high amount of rain due to overwhelming humidity climate.
  - November 2019 - Sarajevo faced 3 aftershocks of an Earthquake with its epicenter in Nevesinje, it is referred to as the Durrës Earthquake.
- 2020
  - January 2020 - Sarajevo faces a dangerous air pollution similar to most Chinese urban cities
  - March 2020 - COVID-19 impacts the education and movement in Sarajevo.
  - 22 March 2020 - A weak aftershock occurred exactly at 6:25 AM (CET) from an earthquake in Zagreb.
  - 29 December 2020 - Another weak aftershock occurred at 12:20 PM (CET) from an earthquake in Petrinja.
- 2021
  - 8 April: Benjamina Karić becomes mayor.
- 2024
  - 29 November: Predrag Puharić becomes acting mayor.
- 2025
  - 16 July: Samir Avdić becomes mayor.

== See also ==
- List of mayors of Sarajevo since 1878
- Other names of Sarajevo

== Bibliography ==
Published in the 19th century

- Charles Knight, ed. (1866). "Bosna-Serai". Geography. English Cyclopaedia. Vol. 2. London: Bradbury, Evans, & Co. hdl:2027/nyp.33433000064794.
- "Bosna Serai", Bradshaw's Hand-Book to the Turkish Empire, vol. 1: Turkey in Europe, London: W.J. Adams, c. 1872
- David Kay (1880), "Principal Towns: Bosna-Serai", Austria-Hungary, Foreign Countries and British Colonies, London: Sampson Low, Marston, Searle, & Rivington, hdl:2027/mdp.39015030647005
- Robert Munro (1900), "To and at Sarajevo", Rambles and studies in Bosnia-Herzegovina and Dalmatia (2nd ed.), Edinburgh: W. Blackwood

Published in the 20th century

- "Bosna-Serai", Chambers's Encyclopaedia, London: W. & R. Chambers, 1901
- F.K. Hutchinson (1909). "(Sarajevo)". Motoring in the Balkans. Chicago: McClurg & Co. OCLC 8647011.
- "Serajevo" . Encyclopædia Britannica. Vol. 24 (11th ed.). 1910. p. 660.
- "Sarajevo". Austria-Hungary (11th ed.). Leipzig: Karl Baedeker. 1911.
- Vladislav Skaric [in Serbian] (1928). Serbian Orthodox Church and the people of Sarajevo in the 17th and 18th century. Sarajevo. (Published in Serbian?)
- "Serajevo". Encyclopaedia of Islam. E.J. Brill. c. 1936.
- Vladislav Skaric [in Serbian] (1937). Sarajevo and its surroundings from the earliest times to the Austro-Hungarian occupation. Sarajevo. (Published in Serbian?)
- Mula Mustafa Bašeskija (1987). Ljetopis (1746-1804) (in Croatian). Sarajevo: Veselin Masleša. ISBN 8621000997. (Sarajevo in the 18th century by contemporary Mulla Mustafa Basheski)
- John F. Burns (26 July 1992). "The Dying City of Sarajevo". New York Times. Photographs by Jon Jones.
- Chris Hedges (28 July 1995). "War Turns Sarajevo Away From Europe". New York Times.
- Amira Dzirolo & Paul E. Schellinger (1996). "Sarajevo". In Trudy Ring (ed.). Southern Europe. International Dictionary of Historic Places. Vol. 3. Fitzroy Dearborn. OCLC 31045650.
- D. Juzbasic, ed. (1997), Papers on History of Sarajevo, Sarajevo: Institute for History/Institute for Oriental Studies

Published in the 21st century

- Fran Markowitz (2007). "Census and Sensibilities in Sarajevo". Comparative Studies in Society and History. 49 (1): 40–73. doi:10.1017/S0010417507000400. JSTOR 4497682. S2CID 143939745.
- A. Popovic (2007). "Sarajevo". In C. Edmund Bosworth (ed.). Historic Cities of the Islamic World. Leiden: Koninklijke Brill. pp. 164–171. ISBN 978-9004153882.
