= Škaljić =

Škaljić is a surname. Notable people with the surname include:

- Asim Škaljić (born 1981), Bosnian footballer
- Fehim Škaljić (born 1949), Bosnian politician
- Nezir Škaljić (1844–1905), Bosnian politician
