= Fehim Čurčić =

Bosnian politician (1866–1916)

Effendi Fehim Čurčić
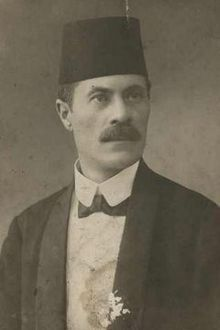
- Čurčić in c. 1910

5th Mayor of Sarajevo
- In office 29 December 1910 – 1915
- Preceded by: Esad Kulović
- Succeeded by: Aristotel Petrović

Personal details
- Born: 1866 Sarajevo, Bosnia Eyalet, Ottoman Empire
- Died: 12 February 1916 (aged 49–50) Grimmenstein, Lower Austria

Fehim ef. Čurčić (Serbo-Croatian Cyrillic: Фехим еф. Чурчић; 1866 – 12 February 1916) was a Bosnian politician who served as the fifth mayor of Sarajevo from 1910 to 1915. On 28 June 1914, he welcomed Archduke Franz Ferdinand of Austria and his wife Sophie, Duchess of Hohenberg to Sarajevo and was present later the same day at their assassination, the event that sparked World War I.

== Early life ==
Fehim Čurčić was born in 1866 into a prominent family who relocated to Sarajevo from Livno in the late 17th century. His father Ragib Čurčić (1824 – 4 July 1888) was a statesman in the Ottoman Empire, and the final mayor of Sarajevo under Ottoman rule from March 1875 until the Austrian occupation in August 1878. Fehim had a brother named Muhamed, and two sisters. The family was Muslim.

== Political career ==
Čurčić worked as a political aspirant in administrative country service. He attended a course for officers and became a spare officer. Čurčić, who was repeatedly elected to Sarajevo's City Council, was the last mayor of Sarajevo during the Austro-Hungarian rule in Bosnia and Herzegovina. Coincidentally, his father Ragib was the last mayor of Sarajevo in 1878 during Ottoman rule.

In the 14 November 1910 election for Mayor of Sarajevo, incumbent mayor Esad Kulović won a third term by an "overwhelming" majority, but refused the post, thus the position was handed over to Čurčić. Coincidentally, the last Bosnian census during Austro-Hungarian rule was conducted in the 1910 election year. Sarajevo at that time had 51,919 inhabitants. Čurčić took post on 29 December 1910. During his tenure, he opened the Chamber of Education in 1911. A year later the Kino Apolo (Apollo Cinema) was opened. Also, the city's main post office was constructed by Josip Vancaš, while the Museum of Sarajevo, as well as the Judicial Palace and the Faculty of Law building of the University of Sarajevo were constructed by Karel Pařík. Čurčić held post until 1915 when the City representation was dismissed during World War I.

== Assassination of Archduke Franz Ferdinand ==
On 28 June 1914, Čurčić delivered a keynote address at Sarajevo City Hall, where he welcomed Archduke Franz Ferdinand of Austria to Sarajevo alongside Governor Oskar Potiorek. Prior to the address, Franz Ferdinand survived an attempt on his life when a bomb missed his car en route to City Hall. Čurčić rode in the first car with the Sarajevo Chief of Police Edmund Gerde and was unaware of what had transpired at the bridge. The noise of the motorcade had drowned out the bomb. Following the address, Gavrilo Princip managed to assassinate Ferdinand and his wife in a second attempt after the Archduke's car had gone the wrong way, an event that sparked World War I.

== Death ==
Čurčić died on 12 February 1916 in an Austrian sanatorium in Grimmenstein.

Political offices
Preceded by Esad Kulović	Mayor of Sarajevo; 1910–1915	Succeeded by Aristotel Petrović
