= History of Sarajevo =

Sarajevo is a city in Bosnia and Herzegovina.

== Ancient history ==
The earliest known settlements in Sarajevo were those of the Neolithic Butmir culture. The discoveries at Butmir were made in modern-day Ilidža, Sarajevo's chief suburb. The area's richness in flint, as well as the Željeznica river helped the settlement flourish. The Butmir culture is most famous for its ceramics.

The Butmir culture was conquered by the Illyrians around 2400 BC. The most prominent of their settlements near Sarajevo was Debelo Brdo (literally "Fat Hill"), where an Illyrian fortification stood during the late Iron Age. Numerous Illyrian forts also existed in other parts of the city, as well as at the base of Trebević. The Illyrians in the Sarajevo region were the Daesitiates, who were the last to resist Roman occupation. Their last revolt occurred in 9 AD, and was stopped by the emperor Tiberius, marking the start of Roman rule in the region.

Under Roman rule, Sarajevo was part of the province of Dalmatia. A major Roman road ran through the Miljacka river valley, connecting the cities of the Adriatic coast with Pannonia in the north. The largest known settlement in the region was known as "Aquae S..." (probably Aquae Sulphurae), at present-day Ilidža.

== Middle Ages ==
The Slavs came to Bosnia in the 7th century. It is fairly certain that they settled in the Sarajevo valley, replacing the Illyrians. Katera, one of the two Bosnian towns mentioned as a part of Serbia by Constantine Porphyrogenitus in De Administrando Imperio, was southeast of Sarajevo. By the time of the Ottoman occupation in the 15th century, there was little settlement in the region.

The first mentions of Bosnia describe a small region, basically the Bosna river valley, stretching from modern-day Zenica to Sarajevo. In the 12th century, when Bosnia became a vassal of Hungary, the population consisted primarily of members of the Bosnian Church. The area of present-day Sarajevo was part of the Bosnian province of Vrhbosna. Another theory is that Vrhbosna was a major settlement located in the middle of modern-day Sarajevo. Perhaps a village existed on the outskirts of the city itself, near present-day Ilidža, one of the most attractive regions in the area, which had been significantly populated for about every other period of its history. It is possible that Vrhbosna may have been destroyed sometime between the 13th century and the Ottoman occupation. Foreign armies had often made their way to Vrhbosna in wars with Bosnia, and perhaps one of them razed the city, leaving it in the condition that the Turks found it in the mid-15th century. Papal documents indicate that in 1238, a cathedral dedicated to Saint Paul was built in the city. It is speculated that the cathedral was located in the present-day Sarajevo neighborhood of Skenderija, as during construction in that neighborhood in the late 19th century, Roman-style columns were found dating to some time around the 12th century. Disciples of the saints Cyril and Methodius traveled to the region, founding a church near Vrelo Bosne. Vrhbosna was a Slavic citadel from 1263 until it was occupied by the Ottoman Empire in 1429.

Various documents from the High Middle Ages reference a place called 'Tornik' in the region. By all indications, 'Tornik' was a very small marketplace and village, and was not considered important by Ragusan merchants. The local fortress of Hodidjed was defended by a mere two dozen men when it fell to the Turks. Sarajevo also fell under siege.

== Early Ottoman era ==
Sarajevo was founded when the Ottoman Empire conquered the region, with 1461 typically regarded as the date of the city's founding. The first known Ottoman governor of Bosnia, Isa-Beg Ishaković, chose the village of Brodac as a good space for a new city. He exchanged land with its residents, giving them what is now the Hrasnica neighborhood in Ilidža. He built a number of buildings, including a mosque, a closed marketplace, a public bath, a bridge, a hostel, and the saray which gave the city its present name. The mosque was named "Careva džamija" (the Emperor's Mosque, or the Imperial Mosque) in honor of Mehmed II. Sarajevo quickly grew into the largest city in the region. Many Christians converted to Islam at this time, and there was a growing Orthodox population. A colony of Ragusan merchants also appeared in Sarajevo at this time. In the early 16th century, Jewish refugees from Andalusia brought the Sarajevo Haggadah.

Under the leadership of Gazi Husrev-beg, a major donor who was responsible for most of what is now the Old Town, Sarajevo grew at a rapid rate. Sarajevo became known for its large marketplace and its mosques, of which there were more than one hundred by the middle of the 16th century. Gazi Husrev-Beg established a number of buildings named in his honor, such as the Sarajevo library. He also built the city's clock tower, the Sahat Kula.

At its height, Sarajevo was the largest and most important Ottoman city in the Balkans after Istanbul. By 1660, the population of Sarajevo was estimated to be over 80,000.

== Late Ottoman era ==
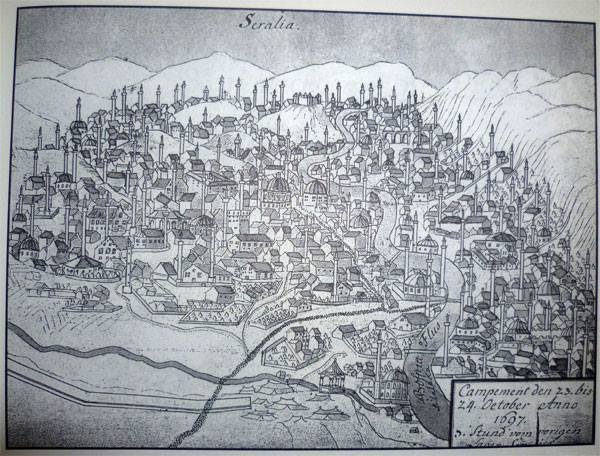
Sarajevo in 1697 at the time of the siege by Eugene de Savoy

Following the Battle of Vienna in 1683, the western portion of the Ottoman Empire was subject to raids. Prince Eugene of Savoy raided Sarajevo and torched it.

An important chronicler of the time was Mula Mustafa Bašeskija who wrote about Sarajevo. Significant libraries, schools, mosques, and fortifications were built during the late Ottoman era. Mustafa wrote about the tensions between the dervish and Kadizadeli, the latter being a significant influence on the city.

In 1762, a plague epidemic hit the city, taking about 15,000 lives. At the time, city's population numbered some 20,000. In 1783, there was another outbreak; some 8,000 people died. Fires and floods were also common. The overflowing Miljacka threatened the city's bazaar. A major flood occurred in 1783 and another in 1791. The largest fire occurred in 1788.

By the early 19th century, Serbia gained independence from the Ottoman Empire, creating a wedge between Sarajevo and Istanbul.

Demanding Bosnian independence from the Turks, Husein-Kapetan Gradaščević fought several battles around Bosnia. The last was the Battle of Sarajevo Field in 1832, where he was betrayed by a fellow Bosniak and lost. There, he spoke his famous words, "This is the last day of our freedom." For the next several decades, no major developments occurred.

== Austria-Hungary ==
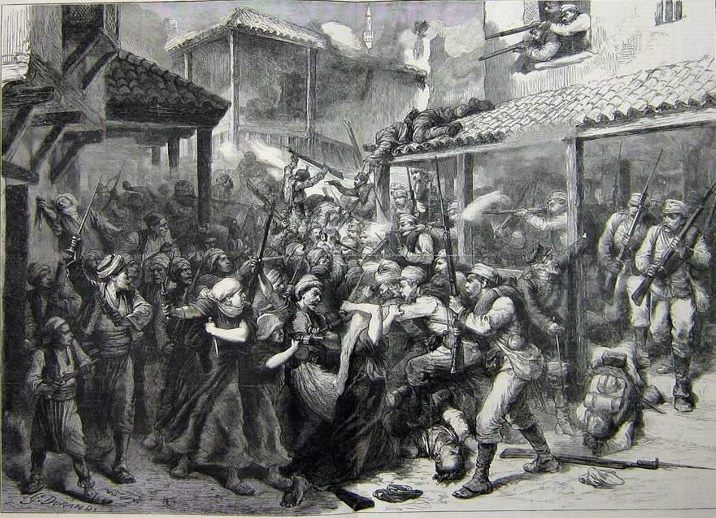
Bosniak resistance during the battle of Sarajevo in 1878 against the Austro-Hungarian occupation

=== Background ===
The Berlin Treaty was imposed by the Great Powers upon the rapidly dissolving Ottoman Empire, which entered the negotiations from a position of weakness, with many of its former territories having achieved de facto independence over the previous half-century and having just been defeated in the Russo-Turkish War. Although the Bosnia Vilayet was part of the Ottoman Empire de jure, it was de facto governed as an integral part of Austria-Hungary with the Ottomans having no say in its governance.

==== Eastern Crisis 1875–1878 ====
Previously, the Ottoman position in the Bosnia Vilayet was weakened by the 1875–1877 Herzegovina uprising, an armed revolt by the local ethnic Serb population that began in the Herzegovina region in July 1875 before spreading to the rest of the vilayet. The uprising lasted more than two years before the Ottomans, aided by the local Muslim population, managed to stop it. In 1875, inspired by the Herzegovina uprising, the exiled Bulgarian revolutionaries operating out of the neighbouring United Romanian Principalities (another de jure Ottoman vassal which was steadily moving towards independence) began planning for their own uprising which began in the spring of 1876. The Ottoman reaction to the Bulgarian insurrection was swift and brutal, leading to many atrocities and universal international condemnation as the uprising was put down within months.

Austria-Hungary closely followed the events of the 1875 Serb peasant rebellion in Bosnia. Shaped by the Austrian-Hungarian foreign minister, Count Gyula Andrássy, who was appointed in 1871 to replace Friedrich von Beust, the dual monarchy's foreign policy identified the Near East as the area of particular interest for its next expansion. Andrássy saw an opportunity to move this policy forward, and on 30 December 1875 he sent a dispatch to his foreign ministry predecessor, Von Beust, who was the Austro-Hungarian Foreign Service's ambassador to the United Kingdom. In the document, known as the "Andrássy Note," Andrássy outlined his vision for Bosnia as a territory governed and administered by Austria-Hungary. After obtaining general assent from the UK and France, the document became official basis for negotiations.

Simultaneous with their defeats in the Russo-Turkish War, Ottoman rule in the Bosnia Vilayet was weakening. Logistical and organisational issues began arising in the Ottoman army, such as inability to feed and clothe its soldiers, including the nineteen garrisons stationed in the Bosnia Vilayet, seventeen of which were made up of local Bosnian Muslims. In a January 1878 report, the Austro-Hungarian consul stationed in the city of Sarajevo, Konrad von Wassitsch, noted to his Vienna superiors that "Ottoman administrative bodies have no authority, and the population has lost its confidence in the government." By spring of 1878, the Ottoman Army in the vilayet was in such a state of disarray that many troops deserted after being left to their own means. As a consequence, an estimated three thousand armed deserters were roaming the countryside in small bands, frequently terrorizing peasants. With no organized force implementing the law, groups of outlaws operated with impunity in many rural areas, effectively seizing control of significant territories.

==== Treaty of San Stefano ====
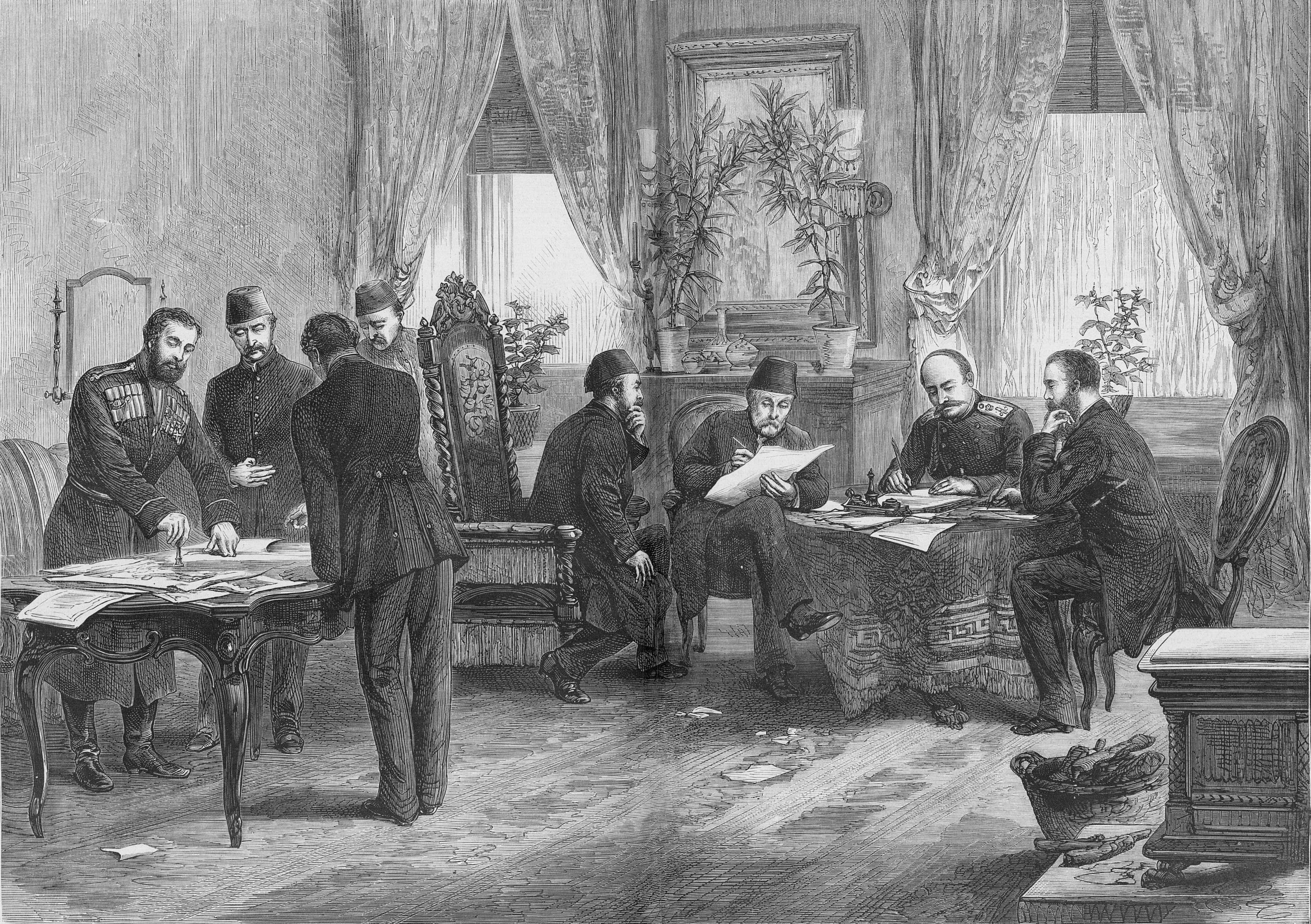
Russian count Nikolay Ignatyev signing the Treaty of San Stefano with his Ottoman counterparts on 3 March 1878. Among its various Balkans-related geopolitical stipulations, the treaty was to see the Bosnia vilayet receive autonomous status within the Ottoman Empire. However, none of the treaty's points ever got implemented due to opposition from the Great Powers.

By late winter of 1878, it became clear that Ottoman authority in the area was weakened. The Treaty of San Stefano, imposed on 3 March 1878 by Russia upon the defeated Ottomans, confirmed it. Among other provisions, it stipulated that there would be full independence from the Ottoman Empire for the principalities of Serbia and Montenegro, de jure autonomy (de facto independence) within the Ottoman Empire for the Principality of Bulgaria, and autonomous province status for the Bosnian Vilayet within the Ottoman Empire.

The Muslim population of the Bosnia Vilayet welcomed the promised greater autonomy thus rekindling their autonomy aspirations. However, international reaction to the treaty was mostly negative. The Great Powers, especially British Prime Minister Benjamin Disraeli, were unhappy with the extension of Russian power, while Austria-Hungary was also disappointed as the treaty failed to expand its influence in the Bosnia Vilayet. In a 21 April 1878 memorandum to the European powers, the Austro-Hungarian foreign minister Gyula Andrássy proposed his Bosnia policy, making a case for a Habsburg occupation of Bosnia Vilayet. He argued that an autonomous Bosnia within the Ottoman Empire lacked the means to overcome internal divisions and maintain its existence against its neighbours. The United Kingdom supported Austria-Hungary's aspirations in Bosnia.

Many of the smaller nations also had objections to the San Stefano Treaty—although satisfied with receiving formal independence, Serbia was unhappy with the Bulgarian expansion, Romania was extremely disappointed as its public perceived some of the treaty stipulations as Russia breaking the Russo-Romanian pre-war agreements that guaranteed the country's territorial integrity, and the Albanians objected to what they considered a significant loss of their territory to Serbia, Bulgaria and Montenegro. Besides Bosnian Muslims, Bulgaria was the only nation happy with the treaty.

==== Local reaction to the prospect of Austro-Hungarian occupation ====
Because of its almost universal rejection by the global powers, the San Stefano Treaty was never implemented, and in the end only set the stage for a conference organized by German Empire chancellor Otto von Bismarck three months later in Berlin. Uncertainty over San Stefano brought about rumours of imminent Austro-Hungarian occupation in Sarajevo as early as April 1878, well before the Berlin Congress, evoking different responses from the city's various ethnicities and classes.

Bosnian Croats welcomed the notion of being occupied by their Roman Catholic co-believers, Austrians and Hungarians, while Bosnian Serbs on the other hand, were universally opposed to it, finding little reason to cheer the replacement of one foreign occupier with another — Serbia's old nemesis, the Habsburg Monarchy.

Bosnian Muslim reaction to the prospect of Austro-Hungarian rule was divided along social lines. Hoping that a smooth transfer of power would enhance their value to the new rulers and help preserve their privileged status and property rights, wealthy and influential landowners, despite being closely tied to the officials of the waning Ottoman regime, were now open to Austro-Hungarians. On the other hand, most of the Muslim religious authorities and lower-class Muslim population were stridently opposed, seeing nothing good in being ruled by a foreign non-Muslim power that had no plans to grant autonomy to Bosnia.

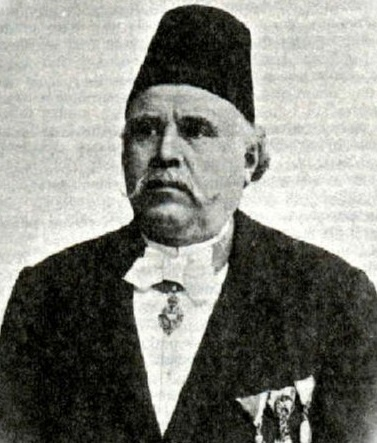
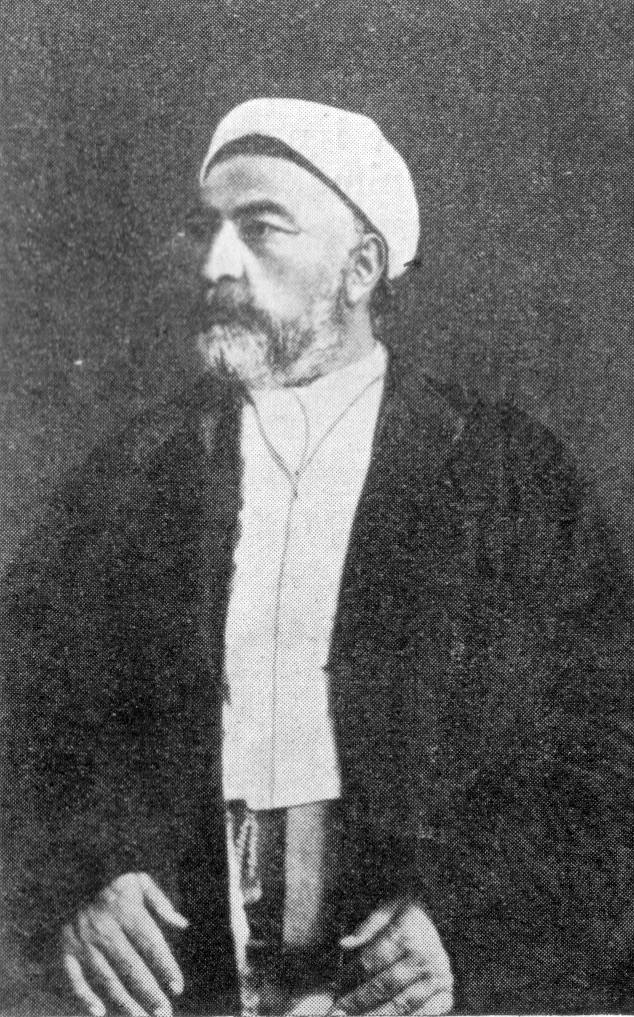
Despite close ties to the Ottoman regime, wealthy Sarajevo Muslim landowners like Mehmed-beg Kapetanović Ljubušak and Mustaj-beg Fadilpašić were receptive to the idea of Austro-Hungarian occupation.

This economic class divide among the Bosnian Muslims on the Austro-Hungarian issue was clearly evident around Sarajevo in spring 1878. Members of Sarajevo's Muslim landowning elite showed public support for the Austro-Hungarian occupation at a meeting in April 1878 at the Emperor's Mosque, reasoning, as one cleric put it, that "it was evident the Ottoman Empire had neither the power nor the support to rule the land" before further asserting that "a ruler who cannot control his land also loses claim to his subjects' obedience and since no Muslim would want to be a subject of Serbia or Montenegro, Austria-Hungary is the only viable alternative". It didn't take long for the lower-class Muslim hostility to a possible Habsburg rule to surface. as in April and May 1878 a petition called the Allied Appeal written by two Islamic conservative religious officials from the Gazi Husrev-bey Mosque's madrasa — effendi Abdulah Kaukčija and effendi Muhamed Hadžijamaković — were circulated in Sarajevo marketplaces. In addition to urging the population of Bosnia to unite in opposing the possible Austro-Hungarian occupation, the petition bore the imprint of Islamic religious conservatism, advocating making shari'a the exclusive law of the land, demanding the dismissal of all Christian officials from the still-ruling Ottoman service, appealing for formation of an assembly to control the government, calling for removal of bells from the recently built Serb Orthodox Cathedral, and requesting demobilization of Ottoman troops. The petition reportedly included some five hundred signatures, but most Muslim landowners refused to sign it.

Reflecting personal politics and worldviews of two Sarajevan Islamic conservatives, well-respected in the local Muslim community, the petition reportedly also became a tool in the rivalry among the Ottoman officials in Bosnia. According to the Austro-Hungarian consul Wassitsch, the Ottoman governor in the Bosnian Vilayet Ahmed Mazhar Pasha planned to use the petition to gain popular support in a bid to keep his post in the event of Bosnia Vilayet acquiring autonomy as specified in the San Stefano Treaty. Mazhar's biggest obstacle in this regard was his own deputy Konstan Pasha, a Greek man of Orthodox faith who was uniformly described amongst the foreign consuls in Sarajevo as the only Christian to hold high office in the Ottoman civil administration in Bosnia. The petitioners' demand to eliminate all Christians would thus have removed Konstan from office and secured the Muslim Mazhar's post had the San Stefano agreement been implemented.

When several upper-class Muslims as well as some Serbian Orthodox leaders learned of the petition, they urged its redrafting without the explicitly anti-Christian demands, which was done, and a new version, written by an Ottoman official, began to circulate. The new petition, formally submitted to governor Mazhar on 2 June 1878, was seen as a win for the leading Muslim landowners who managed to purge it of its anti-Christian and anti-reform provisions. Its only two points were now a demand that a popular assembly rule the land and an appeal to all groups to unite in opposition to Austro-Hungarian occupation.

==== Formation of the People's Assembly ====
In the days following the petition's formal submission to the Ottoman governor, members of Sarajevo's Muslim elite built consensus among the factionalized local players. They managed to persuade representatives of lower-class Muslims, including religious leaders, to join a single all-Muslim assembly, and succeeded in getting governor Mazhar to allow the assembly to meet in the government headquarters building, the Konak.

The new body, called the People's Assembly (Narodni odbor), met for the first on 5 June with an all-Muslim membership consisting of thirty individuals from the Muslim landowning elite and thirty lower-class Muslims (religious functionaries, artisans, and shopkeepers). In an appeal to the central Ottoman government, the assembly blamed Bosnia's woes on Istanbul's mismanagement and the government's failure to respond to individual complaints. The assembly's address continued by claiming that the distant government had driven them to form their own representative body to address local needs with local officials, and warned that the population would defend their land with their lives in the event of a war. It was necessary, the appeal went on, to retain permanent garrisons of Ottoman troops in the Bosnia Vilayet, and in any case the government could neither feed nor clothe its own troops. Finally, the appeal protested the punishment of deserters and their families.

In its very first week, the assembly underwent four changes in composition as elite Muslims sought a formula that would include all ethnic, religious and financial class groups yet preserve their own dominance. On 8 June, the all-Muslim assembly appealed to Ottoman authorities to recognize a representative body of twelve Muslims, two Catholics, two Orthodox, and one Jew, all of them from Sarajevo, plus one Muslim and one Christian delegate from each of the six administrative districts (kotars) in the Bosnian Vilayet — a proposed composition that followed the makeup of the regional council, the consultative body formed in the 1860s that had governed city of Sarajevo since 1872. According to the proposal, matters affecting a single religion were to be handled by delegates from that group, and common matters would be decided in plenary sessions. Governor Mazhar approved the assembly's new composition after consulting with the regional council.

The reconstituted, now multireligious, People's Assembly had its first meeting on 10 June in the Konak. Serbian Orthodox nominees originally refused to participate, claiming that the scheduled meeting fell on an Orthodox holiday, however, after the date was changed, they agreed to participate but declined to take an active role. At the first meeting, Serbian Orthodox representatives claimed they were underrepresented and the assembly honoured their request by inviting the Sarajevo Serbian Orthodox Commune to name three more delegates. The three selected were Risto Besara, Jakov Trifković, and Đorđe Damjanović. Still, though the Muslim lower classes were represented, most of the assembly members from all confessions came from the small group of local upper class leaders who enjoyed honorary Ottoman titles and close ties to the government.

Wealthy Muslim landowner effendi Sunulah Sokolović who was also the regional council member was chosen as the People Assembly's president. Other Muslim members included Mustaj-beg Fadilpašić (son of the wealthy landowner and political leader Fadil-paša Šerifović), Mehmed-beg Kapetanović (wealthy landowner who came to Sarajevo from Herzegovina), effendi Mustafa Kaukčija, effendi Ahmet Svrzo, effendi Ragib Ćurčić, etc. Serbs were represented by merchant Dimitrije Jeftanović and effendi Petraki Petrović. Croats had friar Grga Martić and Petar Jandrić. And finally Jews were represented by effendi Salomon Isaković who made a good living by selling provisions to Ottoman troops.

Steered along and finessed by the Muslim upper class members who had the most representation and influence, all the while avoiding divisive topics, the assembly managed to cobble together minimum unity and consensus throughout the month of June 1878. The big test would prove to be coming up with a coherent reaction to the decisions of the Berlin Congress that was simultaneously taking place.

==== Treaty of Berlin ====
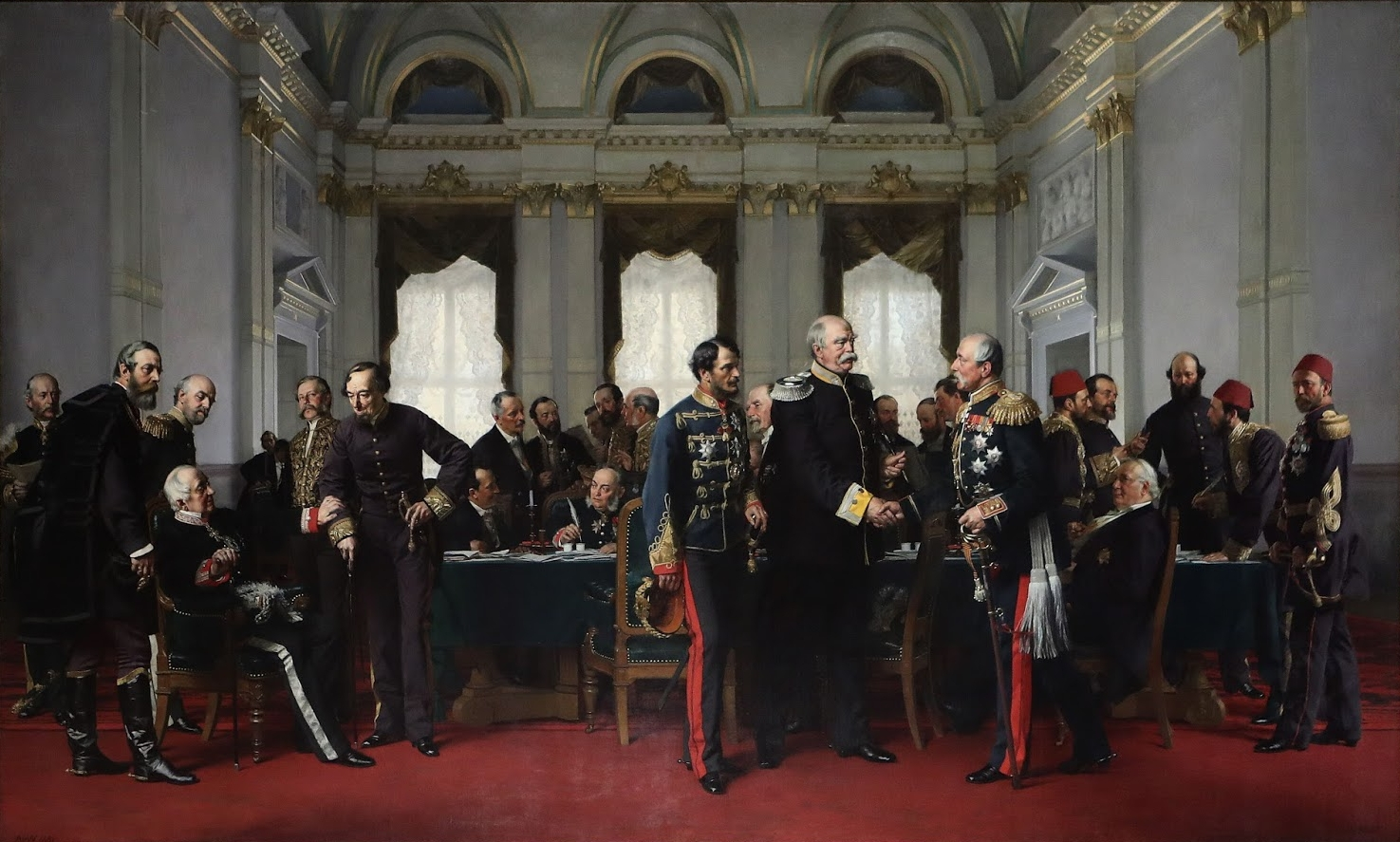
The Congress of Berlin's final legal act on 28 June 1878 was the Treaty of Berlin. Among its various stipulations, the treaty gave Austria-Hungary a legal mandate to occupy the Ottoman Empire's Bosnia Vilayet.

At the Berlin Treaty negotiations, the Austro-Hungarian side was represented by the k. und k. foreign minister, count Gyula Andrássy, who was keen to expand the Imperial and Royal influence in the Balkans.

As a show of force and statement of intent, simultaneously with the start of the treaty negotiations in mid June 1878, the Austro-Hungarian Army began a major mobilization effort with more than 80,000 troops on its southeast border, ready to go into Bosnia Vilayet. For this action, the Austro-Hungarian authorities made a point of predominantly stacking their troops with k. und k. subjects of South Slavic origin — ethnic Croats and ethnic Serbs — feeling the Bosnia Vilayet population wouldn't be as outraged with the occupation after seeing their own kin amongst the invading troops.

On 28 June 1878, the terms and stipulations of the Treaty of Berlin were announced and according to its 25th point, Austria-Hungary received a mandate to "occupy and administer the Bosnian Vilayet", but not to annex it. The treaty thus officially nullified the provision of the San Stefano Treaty that foresaw autonomy for the Bosnian Vilayet.

=== Austro-Hungarian takeover ===
Austria-Hungary asserted its intent to occupy Bosnia vilayet in a telegram from Andrassy's foreign ministry received by the k. und k. consul in Sarajevo Konrad von Wassitsch on 3 July with Ottoman officials in the Konak also learning of the impending occupation from telegrams that arrived shortly after Wassitsch's. To some, such an open manner of announcing the Berlin Treaty's occupation terms was indicative of Vienna's assumption that they would be welcomed with open arms by the local population.

==== Local reaction to the Berlin Treaty ====
By the next morning, city was abuzz with rumours and trepidation as Wassitsch made rounds to visit with upper-class Muslim landowners and the main leaders of the local People's Assembly, Mehmed-beg Kapetanović, Sunulah Sokolović, and Mustaj-beg Fadilpašić, reminding them of the generous benefits that would come to those loyal to the new regime. Each of the three promised to work toward a peaceful reception for k. und k. troops, though at the same time expressing fears of a lower-class uprising in opposition to new occupiers. Later that day Wassitsch went to see Ottoman governor Mazhar who told him he would support armed resistance to Austro-Hungarian rule unless he received orders from Istanbul to the contrary. At a regional council meeting the same day, Mazhar called on the councilors to support a resistance movement. This created a strange situation with Sokolović, president of the People's Assembly and a member of the regional council, taking the unusual step of opposing the governor's recommendation by advocating peaceful transition of power to Habsburg officials while Fadilpašić and Kapetanović backed him at the same meeting. Public demand for resistance among the lower-class masses was in evidence during the same day as a large green flag was hoisted in the courtyard of the Gazi Husrev-beg Mosque.

Local imam turned brigand Hadži Lojo led the July 1878 popular revolt against the impending Austro-Hungarian occupation by first taking control of the People's Assembly from the upper-class local Muslims and then confronting local Ottoman authorities.

The next day, 5 July, following noontime prayers Muslim worshipers lingered in the surrounding streets as they listened to local rabble-rouser Salih Vilajetović, better known around the city as Hadži Lojo, deliver a stirring speech in which he called for Wassitsch and the rest of the Austro-Hungarian consulate staff to be expelled from the city. A tall, strong, and physically imposing 44-year-old agitator, Hadži Lojo was quite well known locally, having for years served as imam at a small Sarajevo mosque and taught religion at a trade school. He also had a history of unlawful activity having recently returned to Sarajevo after being expelled and living as a brigand for three years. Sharing both his vocation and educational background with Hadžijamaković and Kaukčija, the two Gazi Husrev-bey Mosque clerics behind the April Petition, Hadži Lojo very well understood the local Muslim political and religious culture in which he operated and skillfully exploited it to galvanize the crowd into action. Following his impassioned speech, Hadži Lojo unfurled a green flag and led the crowd from the mosque to Konak across river Miljacka to confront governor Mazhar and other Ottoman officials. The demonstrators' fury was directed as much at Sultan Abdul Hamid II as it was at the Berlin Treaty decisions, with the bellowing cry of 'You can give away Stambul, but not Bosnia'. Mazhar addressed the angry mob from the Konak's balcony, appealing on them to disperse, but after they failed to adhere he made a concession by agreeing to dismiss current the Ottoman military commander, an unpopular figure, promising that he'd be replaced with a new Sarajevo-born commander. Satisfied for the moment, the Muslims dispersed at dusk.

By 7 July, governor Mazhar heard from his Istanbul superiors, receiving only vague instructions to retain public order pending conclusion of negotiations with Austria-Hungary. Lacking firm direction, he continued to take a permissive stance towards the possibility of local armed resistance to Habsburg rule.

Crowds of local Muslim men continued their daily gatherings to demonstrate in the courtyards of Gazi Husrev-beg Mosque and the Sultan's Mosque. They wanted Sarajevan Christians and Jews to join them too, who out of concern for their safety mostly retired to their homes when the demonstrations began. Within days, on 9 July, the crowd managed to force the People's Assembly to relocate from Konak to Morića Han across the river — a move seen as assembly's symbolic transition from a representative body under elite Muslim control to an activist gathering under the influence of the conservative religious establishment and lower-class Muslims.

On 10 July, the crowd demanded a change in the People's Assembly composition. so that groups claiming underrepresentation got more members. According to Wassitsch, this particular demand was instigated and pushed through by pan-Slav activists opposing Habsburg rule, leading to an increased number of Serb Orthodox members in the reconstituted assembly so that the new body consisted of 30 Muslims, 15 Serbs, 3 Jews, and 2 Croats. Most Muslim landlords abandoned the assembly within days, the only exception being Mustaj-beg Fadilpašić who was persuaded to stay and was elected as the new president.

With most upper-class Muslims gone, the assembly came under Hadži Lojo's control. He essentially turned it into the organizing body for armed resistance to Habsburg occupation. It was divided into two committees, one to assemble troops and the other to secure provisions and funds. Seeking credibility with Ottoman authorities, Hadži Lojo assembled an armed retinue that he moved around with, even showing up in Konak to seek immunity from Mazhar for past misdeeds. After receiving it, Hadži Lojo even made the humiliated governor pay him a token cash payment in recognition of his name being cleared.

The fading Ottoman authority in Sarajevo received some reinforcements on 12 July with four battalions dispatched from Istanbul under new military commander Hafiz Pasha. With governor Mazhar Pasha's credibility gone, commander Hafiz Pasha was now the only authority in the city. Though at first urging the local population to accept Austro-Hungarian occupation, he then sat at subsequent regional council meetings in enigmatic silence, leaving the foreign consul to ponder his personal attitude towards possible armed resistance as the invasion drew near. Although his predecessor banned the People's Assembly meetings, Hafiz didn't interfere when the meetings resumed on 18 July with preparations for armed resistance their only order of business as Sarajevo settled into an uneasy peace.

With the Hadži Lojo-controlled Assembly getting ready for a fight unimpeded by Ottoman authority, the Ottomans still retained the weapons and ammunition depots as confrontation between Hafiz and Hadži Lojo seemed inevitable. On 25 July Hadzi Lojo led a crowd in front of Konak demanding access to weapons depots from Hafiz, who told the crowd he would wire the request to Istanbul, which won him another 48 hours.

==== Civil disorder ====
On 27 July, further evidence of Austro-Hungarian invasion sparked unrest as consul Wassitch distributed copies of the Emperor's proclamation about the occupation. In his report, Wassitch noted seeing shopkeepers closing up before noon in order to go home and claim weapons as the final assault on the Ottoman authority in the city was being prepared by Hadži Lojo. Just after noon, a crowd led by the charismatic populist leader showed up in front of the Konak where Ottoman officials and local Muslim elite had fled for protection. Local Muslim conscripts from nearby barracks deserted their units, joining the armed mob. Around 4 p.m. Hafiz's remaining Ottoman force tried to clear the street next to the Konak building, but the crowd, now swollen with defecting soldiers, fought back as the two groups exchanged close-range fire. with an estimated twenty casualties on both sides. In the end, the Ottoman forces managed to clear the street, but were also faced with more local soldiers deserting its ranks.

As night fell on the city, Hafiz's dwindling troops returned to their barracks while resurgent crowds outside began cutting water lines to the barracks, blocking the delivery of provisions, and cutting telegraph wires, hoping to isolate the city and prevent the Ottomans from summoning reinforcements. The People's Assembly began a meeting at the Sultan's Mosque that continued long into the night.

==== The People's Government is proclaimed ====
At daybreak, Hafiz made one last attempt to restore his authority by leading his loyalists to the Bijela Tabija fortress high above the city, but got nowhere as more of his troops deserted. He was captured and escorted back down into the city where he was turned over to Hadži Lojo and put in jail; the crowd prevailed and by 9 a.m. took control of the Ottoman weaponry.

The same day, the crowd's leaders, led by members of the People's Assembly, met at the Gazi Husrev-beg Mosque to proclaim the People's Government (Narodna vlada). Despite dominant sentiment favouring the election of native Bosnians, the leaders persuaded the crowd to elect Hafiz as governor, thus providing a thread of continuity with the previous regime. Muhamed Hadžijamaković, one of the instigators of the April petition, was made the Commander of the People's Army while an emissary was dispatched to Wassitch to assure him that no harm would come to him, to others in his consulate, or to other consuls in the city. Within hours, he received another visit from the People's Government leaders, who asked if he wished to depart for the Adriatic coast along with the party of deposed Ottoman officials. Wassitch opted to stay.

Later that day, the two former rival and top Ottoman officials, Mazhar Pasha and Konstan Pasha, were stopped by the crowd as they departed Sarajevo for Istanbul via Mostar. While in the hands of the angry crowd, they were robbed of all their possessions and their lives were threatened. Reacting to the capture, Wassitsch proposed that all five consuls appear together at the Konak to ask that the two pashas and other prisoners be delivered to them, however the other four consuls (meeting without Wassitch because troops loyal to the crowd surrounded the Austro-Hungarian consulate) felt that any demarche involving Wassitsch was bound to inflame the crowd. Instead they agreed to send a conciliatory letter asking that the lives of the two captive Ottoman officials be spared. Just in time, Hadzi Lojo personally intervened to rescue the two officials. They both eventually reached Istanbul and returned to their careers in the Ottoman bureaucracy.

==== Austro-Hungarian Army invades Bosnia ====
On 29 July 1878, one day after the People's Government was proclaimed in Sarajevo, the Austro-Hungarian Army under the command of feldzeugmeister (general) Josip Filipović, an ethnic Croat from Gospić, entered the Bosnia Vilayet at four different crossings. Filipović's idea was to first secure the major transportation arteries and the largest towns. Approaching from the south, west, and north, the k. und k. forces planned to suppress the resistance by conquering Sarajevo, its organizing center.

In Sarajevo, the resistance fighters, overwhelmingly made up of local lower-class Muslims received some unexpected reinforcements as the local Serbs, encouraged by their religious and community leaders, began taking up arms and joining the resistance. This sudden cooperation between Muslims and Serbs contrasted remarkably with their grinding conflict of several years earlier during the Herzegovina Uprising when Serbian Orthodox kmets rose up against Muslim beys. However, according to historian Misha Glenny, the sudden alliance between Muslims and Serbs reflected a temporary coincidence of interests, rather than a basis for a future alliance.

With a force of some 80,000 soldiers in total, 9,400 of which were 'occupation troops' under feldmarschallleutnant (lieutenant-general) Stjepan Jovanović, another ethnic Croat from Lika and former k. und k. consul in Sarajevo from 1861 until 1865, whose role was to move across the border from Austrian Dalmatia into Herzegovina and hold places once they're taken by the main fighting force, Filipović's Austro-Hungarian Army moved swiftly down through northern Bosnia, seizing Banja Luka, Maglaj, and Jajce, encountering several successful resistance ambushes along the way that slowed down their progress. On 3 August a group of hussars was ambushed near Maglaj on the Bosna river, prompting Filipović to institute martial law. Austro-Hungarian consul Wassitsch fled Sarajevo with his staff and belongings on 4 August after receiving a written directive from the revolutionary government to leave the city. He led a convoy of about one hundred consular employees and Austro-Hungarian citizens on the road to Mostar. The people's government provided armed escorts to ward off dangers posed by Muslim irregulars along the way. Wassitsch and his entourage safely reached the border near Metković several days later. Meanwhile, feldmarschallleutnant Jovanović's second occupying force, the 18th Division, had been advancing up along the Neretva river, capturing Mostar on 5 August. On 7 August a pitched battle was fought near Jajce and the Austro-Hungarian infantry lost 600 men.

Within days of crossing the border into Bosnia, feldzeugmeister Filipović came to the conclusion that the Austro-Hungarian 'soft strategy' of capturing town-by-town is not going to work and that the aim of occupying Sarajevo would require more manpower and more brutal tactics, so he requested and received reinforcements. The k. und k. force more than tripled with 268,000 men now on the ground trying to occupy Bosnia Vilayet.

Well equipped and well informed about the towns, roads, and bridges in their path, the Austro-Hungarians heavily defeated the local resistance at the battle of Klokoti near Vitez on 16 August. Two days later they reached the outskirts of Sarajevo and began installing cannons on the hills surrounding the city.

==== Battle of Sarajevo ====
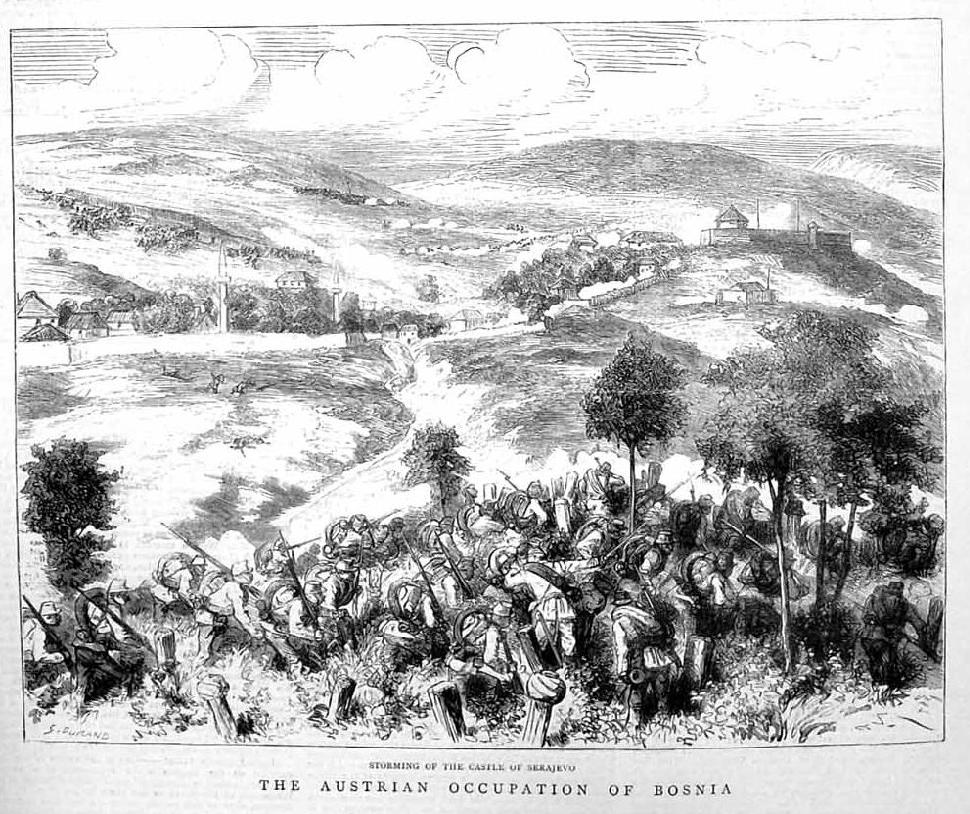
Austro-Hungarian forces storming Sarajevo on 19 August 1878.

On the morning of Monday, 19 August around 6:30am, the Austro-Hungarian Army began its artillery bombardment of Sarajevo using 52 cannons with feldzeugmeister Filipović committing a sizable portion of the total 14,000 troops under his command for this action to the hills surrounding the city.

Then, the infantry came into the city from the western direction of Ilidža, facing a spirited resistance from some 5,000 citizens of Sarajevo who heeded a call to arms. Pushing the resistance fighters towards the more densely populated city center, gunfire welcomed the invading troops “from every house, from every window, from every doorway…even women were taking part” as close combat ensued for individual streets and houses with children also resisting in addition to women. A particularly vicious battle took place near the Ali Pasha's Mosque with some 50 resistance fighters losing their lives with some executed right on the spot.

By 1:30pm the Austro-Hungarians essentially won the battle as the resistance fighters got pushed outside of the city towards Romanija and by early evening Sarajevo found itself under full Habsburg control. Around 5pm Filipović triumphantly marched into the Konak, the Ottoman governor's residence, thus symbolically commencing the Austro-Hungarian era in Sarajevo and Bosnia.

The Austro-Hungarian casualties in Sarajevo were reportedly 57 dead and 314 injured. On the resistance side around 400 casualties were reported. The k. und k. principal force moved on to Herzegovina and the Sanjak of Novi Pazar.

==== Austro-Hungarian revenge in Sarajevo ====
On 23 August, only four days after conquering Sarajevo, feldzeugmeister Filipović impaneled a special court with summary judgement authority. Over the following several days nine Sarajevo Muslims were hanged for instigating the uprising or leading the resistance against Austro-Hungarian troops.

The first condemned to death was Muhamed Hadžijamaković. While approaching the Konak to give himself up to Filipović, he was captured, then taken to a trial the same day, sentenced to death by mid-afternoon, and finally around 4 p.m. taken to be hanged from an oak tree. Though over sixty years of age, large and powerful Hadžijamaković managed to wrest a revolver from one of his captors and fire twice, injuring several guards in the ensuing struggle. Bloodied and unconscious from a knife wound, mortally wounded Hadžijamaković was hanged after sunset.

The next to be executed was Hadžijamaković's fellow cleric and resistance leader Abdulah Kaukčija. He too received a brief hearing on 24 August before being sentenced to death by hanging the same day. Over the next few days seven more Muslim resistance fighters — Avdo Jabučica, hadži Avdaga Halačević, Suljo Kahvić, hadži Mehaga Gačanica, Mehmed-aga Dalagija, Ibrahimaga Hrga, and Mešo Odobaša — were hanged as the resistance was still gaining strength in areas outside Sarajevo.

=== Austro-Hungarian rule ===
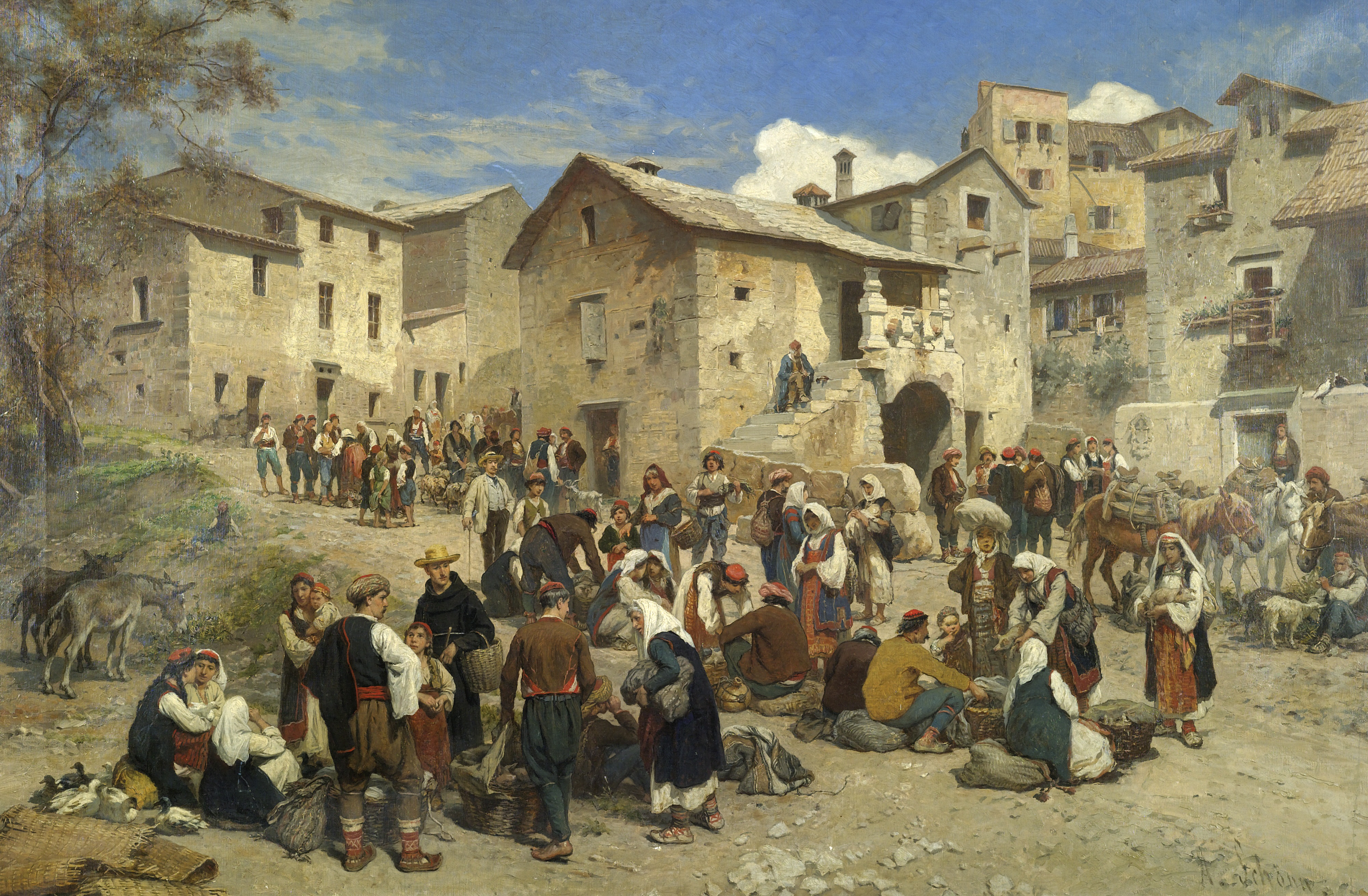
Sarajevo in 1897

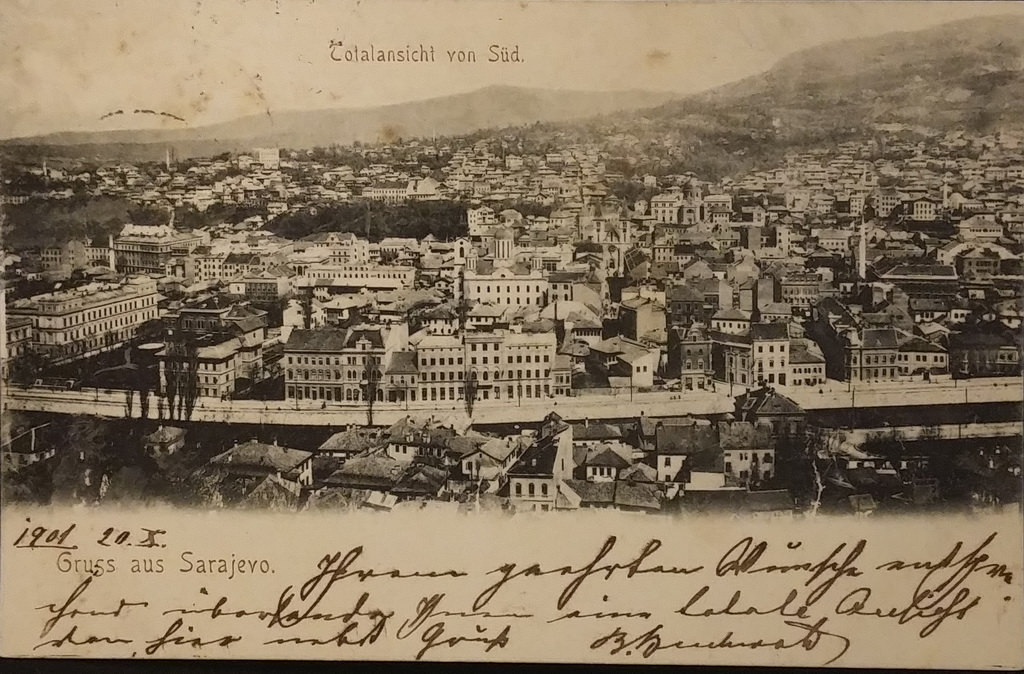
Sarajevo in 1901

The Habsburg period of Sarajevo's history was characterized by industrialization, development, westernization, and social change. It could be argued that the three most prominent alterations made by the Habsburgs to Sarajevo were to the city's political structure, architecture style, and education system.

==== Political ====
The immediate political change made by the Austrians was to do away with what were then regarded as outdated Ottoman political divisions of the city, and put in place their own system which was centered on major roads.

==== 1880s architectural expansion ====
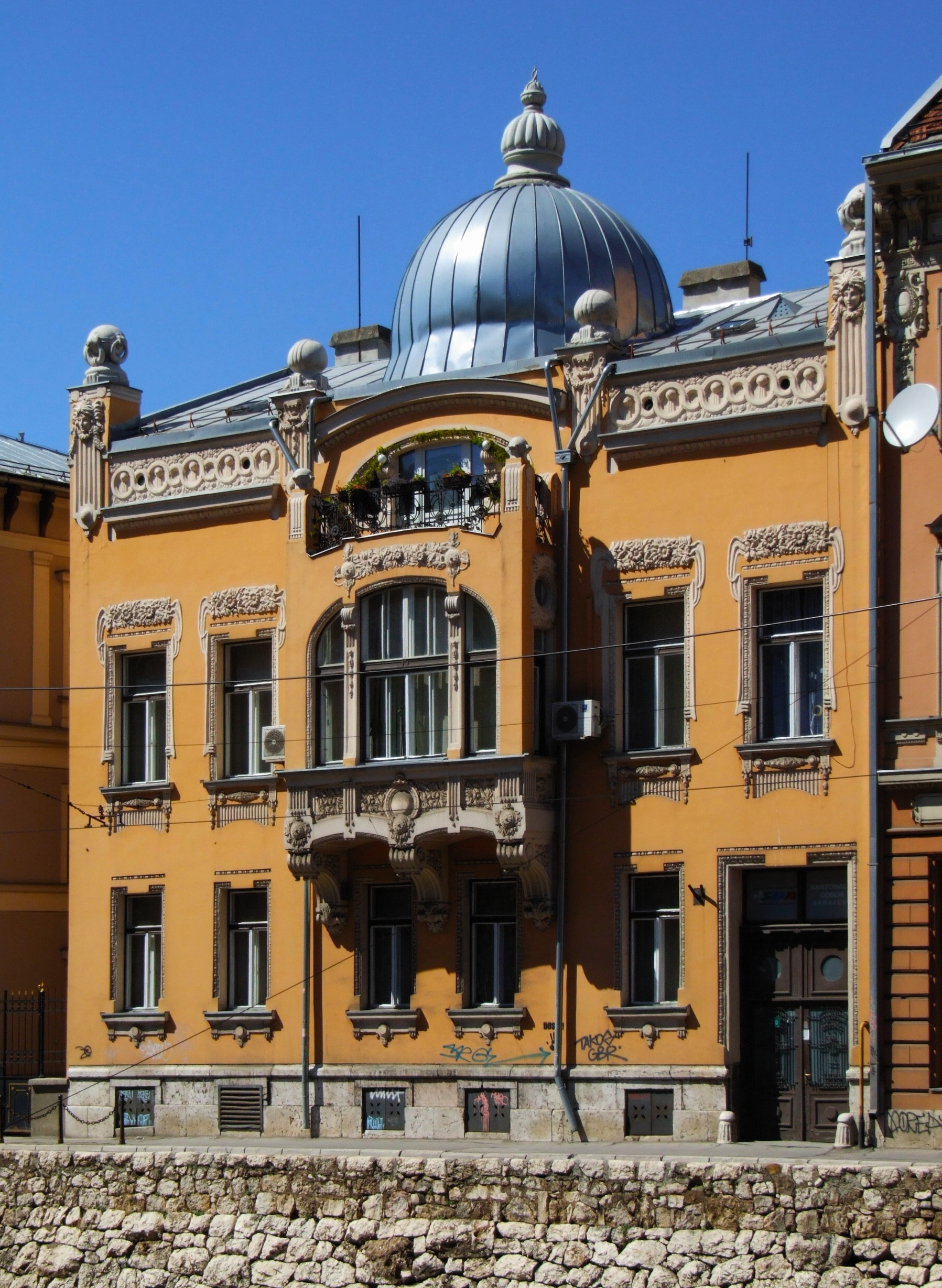
A building built during the Austro-Hungarian period in Sarajevo.

Unexpectedly aided by a fire that burned down a large part of the central city area (čaršija), architects and engineers who desired to modernize Sarajevo rushed to the city. The result was a unique blend of the remaining Ottoman city market and contemporary Western architecture. For the first time in centuries, the city significantly expanded outside its traditional borders. Much of the city's contemporary central municipality (Centar) was constructed during this period.

Architecture in Sarajevo quickly developed into a wide range of styles and buildings. The Cathedral of Sacred Heart, for example, was constructed using elements of neo-Gothic and Romanesque architecture. The National Museum, Sarajevo brewery, and City Hall were also constructed during this period.

==== Educational ====
As the Austro-Hungarians believed theirs was a far more modern and advanced nation than the Ottoman Empire, Sarajevo was quickly westernized and adapted to their standards. A western education system was implemented, and Sarajevo's inhabitants started writing in Latin script for the first time.

=== End of Habsburg dominance ===
In 1908, the territory was formally annexed and turned into a condominium jointly controlled by both Austrian Cisleithania and Hungarian Transleithania.

By 1910, Sarajevo was populated by just under 52,000 people. Just four years later the most famous event in the history of Habsburg Sarajevo, and perhaps in the city's history, occurred. The assassination in Sarajevo, in which a young Serb nationalist named Gavrilo Princip assassinated Archduke Franz Ferdinand of Austria and his wife Sophie, Duchess of Hohenberg on their visit to the city, started a chain of events that led to World War I. At the end of the Great War and as part of the 1919 Paris Peace Conference, Austria-Hungary ceased to exist. Sarajevo became part of the new Kingdom of Yugoslavia.

== Yugoslavia ==
After World War I Sarajevo became part of the Kingdom of Yugoslavia. Though it held some political importance, as the center of first the Bosnian region and then the Drina Banovina, it was not treated with the same attention or considered as significant as it had been in the past. Outside of today's national bank of Bosnia and Herzegovina, virtually no significant contributions to the city were made during this period.

During World War II the Kingdom of Yugoslavia put up a very inadequate defense. Following a German bombing campaign, Sarajevo was taken by the Wehrmacht on 15 April 1941. When the Wehrmacht marched in, a large crowd of Bosnian Muslims came out to welcome them while the streets in the Muslim quarter were decorated with swastikas. However, the historian David Motadel noted that those Bosnian Muslims loyal to Yugoslavia would have been unlikely to display their colors as the Wehrmacht marched in. One of the first acts of the new German occupation regime was to blow up the plaque celebrating Gavrilo Princip's assassination of the Archduke Franz Ferdinand. As part of the carve-up of Yugoslavia all of Bosnia-Herzegovina was assigned to the Ustase Croatian fascist NDH (Nezavisna Država Hrvatska--Independent State of Croatia), a puppet state of Nazi Germany. In 1941, Sarajevo had 85,000 people and the population of the city was 34% Muslim, 29% Catholic Croat, 25% Orthodox Serb and 10% Jewish. Despite their different religions, all four of these ethnoreligious groups spoke the same language, namely Serbo-Croatian. The Ustaše ascribed to an extremely virulent and violent racist ethnoreligious ultra-nationalism, which defined being Croat in racial and religious terms. The policy of the Ustaše regime was to forcibly convert one-third of the Serbs living in the NDH to Roman Catholicism, expel one-third into Serbia and to kill the remaining one-third. Likewise, the Jews and Romany (Gypsies) living in the NDH were to be exterminated. Ante Pavelić, the Poglavnik ("Leader") of the Ustaše was sympathetic towards Bosnian Muslims, whom he considered "Croats of Muslim faith", and he appointed a Bosnian Muslim as mayor of Sarajevo and a Croat as deputy mayor. Despite Pavelić onward proclamations of friendship towards the Bosnian Muslims and the status of Islam as a nearly co-equal "national religion", many Bosnian Muslims complained in the NDH Roman Catholicism was treated as the first national religion and Islam as the second national religion. In general felt that they had a lesser status compared to the Roman Catholics in the NDH. By late April 1941, over a thousand Ustaše Militiamen had been assigned to Sarajevo. The majority of the Ustaše militia in Sarajevo were not from Bosnia-Herzegovina, but rather came from the rural areas of northern Croatia. The Ustaše militiamen quickly made themselves unpopular in Sarajevo on the account of their rapacious corruption and insatiable greed along with arrogant bullying behavior and boorish manners.

The principle targets of violence by the Ustaše were Sarajevo's Serb, Jewish and Romany populations, who in the Ustaše ideology had no place in the NDH. One of the first acts of the Ustaše was to fire all Serbs from the city government, ban the use of the Cyrillic alphabet and shut down services of the Orthodox church. The Ustaše also targeted those Bosnian Muslims known to be loyal to Yugoslavia for execution. Likewise, Bosnian Muslims were executed for having engaged in what considered to be "Serbian" behavior such as writing Serbo-Croatian in the Cyrillic alphabet instead of the Latin alphabet as the Ustaše favored. The Sarajevo police department, which was staffed by Ustaše loyalists, would raid Serb communities at night to pick up small groups of Serbs who taken out to the countryside to be executed, via the usual Ustaše methods of stabbed, hacked or clubbed to death. The largest of these raids occurred on 11 August 1941 when about 100 Sarajevo Serbs were arrested on allegations of belonging to either the Chetniks or the Partisans. About a dozen were executed with the rest being sent to concentration camps. The majority of the Serbs executed in Sarajevo were intellectuals. As common with the "submerged" nations of Eastern Europe, intellectuals in Bosnia-Herzegovina had an immense influence as the bearers and trustees of the national culture. Targeting Serb intellectuals for execution was a form of not only physical genocide, but also cultural genocide as well intended to deprive the Serb community of its natural leaders. The inability of the Ustaše to set up a properly functioning economy and the fixture of the NDH regime on creating an racially and ethnically pure nation-state at the expense of economic issues made the new regime very unpopular in Sarajevo with all the ethnic groups. Despite the orders to fire all Serbs from the local government, in practice it proved impossible to do so without throwing Sarajevo into chaos as for an example one-third of all teachers in Sarajevo and half of the judges were Serbs. There were several times when the Ustaše ended in face-offs with local Bosnian Croats who refused to take part in the executions of their Serb friends and colleagues.

On 12 October 1941 a group of 108 notable Muslim citizens of Sarajevo signed the Resolution of Sarajevo Muslims in which they condemned the persecution of Serbs organized by Ustaše, made a distinction between Muslims who participated in such persecutions and the whole Muslim population, presented information about the persecutions of Muslims by the Chetniks and requested security for all citizens of the country, regardless of their identity. Many of the city's Serbs, Romani, and Jews were killed in the Holocaust bringing a sad end to the prominence of Sarajevo's Jewish community. In 1941, the atrocities committed by the Ustase were strongly condemned by groups of Sarajevo's citizens. Between 5–9 April 1943, Sarajevo was visited by the Grand Mufti of Jerusalem, Amin al-Husseini, as a part of a recruiting tour for the 13th Waffen SS Handschar division. In Sarajevo, the Grand Mufti met with Muslim leaders from across the Balkans, through the fact that Grand Mufti only spoke Arabic required a translator when he gave the Friday sermon at the Gazi Husrev-beg Mosque.

The Sarajevo resistance was led by a NLA Partisan named Vladimir "Valter" Perić. Legend has it that when a new German officer came to Sarajevo and was assigned to find Valter, he asked his subordinate to show him Valter. The man took the officer to the top of a hill overlooking the city and said "See this city?", "Das ist Valter". Valter was killed in the fighting on the day of Sarajevo's liberation, 6 April 1945. He has since become a city icon.

Following the liberation, Sarajevo was the capital of the republic of Bosnia within the Socialist Federal Republic of Yugoslavia. The communists invested heavily in Sarajevo, building many new residential blocks in Novi Grad Municipality and Novo Sarajevo Municipality, while simultaneously developing the city's industry and transforming Sarajevo once again into one of the Balkans' chief cities. From a post-war population of 115,000, by the fall of Yugoslavia Sarajevo had 429,672 people.

Sarajevo hosted the 1984 Winter Olympics. They are widely regarded as among the most successful winter Olympic Games in history. They were followed by an immense boom in tourism, making the 1980s one of the city's best decades in a long time.

== Modern ==
The Avaz Twist Tower is the headquarters of the Sarajevo newspaper Dnevni avaz

Bosmal City Center

The history of modern Sarajevo begins with the declaration of independence of Bosnia and Herzegovina from Yugoslavia. The city then became the capital of the new state, as the local division of the Yugoslav People's Army established itself on the surrounding mountains. That day, massive peace protests took place. In the midst of the largest one, a protester named Suada Dilberović was shot by unidentified gunmen from a nearby skyscraper.

The following three years found Sarajevo the center of the longest siege in the history of modern warfare. The city was held without electricity, heating, water, or medical supplies. During this time, the surrounding Serb forces shelled the city. An average of 329 shell impacts occurred per day, with a high of 3,777 shell impacts on 22 July 1993.

Aside from the economic and political structures, the besiegers targeted numerous cultural sites. Thus places such as the Gazi Husrev-beg's Mosque, Cathedral of Jesus' Heart, and the Jewish cemetery were damaged, while places like the old City Hall and the Olympic museum were completely destroyed. For foreigners an event that defined the cultural objectives of the besiegers occurred during the night of 25 August 1992, the intentional shelling and utter destruction with incendiary shells of the irreplaceable Bosnia National and University Library, the central repository of Bosnian written culture, and a major cultural center of all the Balkans. Among the losses were about 700 manuscripts and incunabula and a unique collection of Bosnian serial publications, some from the mid-19th century Bosnian cultural revival. Libraries all over the world cooperated afterwards to restore some of the lost heritage, through donations and e-texts, rebuilding the library in cyberspace.

It is estimated that 12,000 people were killed and another 50,000 wounded during the siege. Through all this time however, the Bosnian Serb army was unable to decisively capture the city thanks to the effort of the Bosnian forces inside it. Following the Dayton Accords and a period of stabilization, the Bosnian government declared the siege officially over on 29 February 1996. Most Serbs left Sarajevo in early 1996.

The next several years were a period of heavy reconstruction. During the siege, nearly every building in the city was damaged. Ruins were present throughout the city, and bullet holes were very common. Land mines were also located in the surroundings.

Thanks to foreign aid and domestic dedication, the city began a slow path to recovery. By 2003, there were practically no ruins in the city and bullet holes had become a rarity. Sarajevo was hosting numerous international events once again, such as the extremely successful Sarajevo Film Festival, and launched bids to hold the Winter Olympic Games in the city in the not so distant future.

Today Sarajevo is one of the fastest-developing cities in the region. Various new modern buildings have been built, significantly the Bosmal City Center and the Avaz twist tower which is tallest skyscraper in the Balkans. A new highway was recently completed between Sarajevo and the city of Kakanj. The Sarajevo City Center which started construction in 2008 opened early to public in 2014. If current growth trends continue, the Sarajevo metropolitan area should return to its pre-war population by 2020, with the city following soon after. At its current pace, Sarajevo won't surpass the million resident mark until the second half of the 21st century. The most widely accepted and pursued goal was for the city to hold the Winter Olympics in 2014. The bid failed but Sarajevo managed to hold the 2019 European Youth Olympic Winter Festival, the second major winter sports event after the 1984 Winter Olympic Games.

The Trebević Cable Car transportation system was rebuilt following its use during 1984 Winter Olympic Games. The Trebević cable car is one of Sarajevo's key landmarks. The cost involved was 12,109,000 euros and it was completed and opened to public on 6 April 2018. Cable cars and equipment have been donated by the Graechen ski centre in Wallis Canton, Switzerland. The new Trebević cable car contains six sitting cabins and between 11 and 13 pillars, with a capacity to transport 1,200 passengers an hour. Further monetary donations (approx 3,000,000 euros) have been made by Dutch national Edmond Offermann. The new cable car is able to transport at a faster speed then its older system.

During the development of the city in the modern era, the city experienced numerous earthquake aftershocks coming from nearby neighbour nations. Between late-2019 and 2021, Sarajevo has been hit with six aftershocks. The first three were in November 2019 from an earthquake in Nevesinje which came shortly after the Albania earthquake. On 22 March 2020, Sarajevo was hit with a weak aftershock from an earthquake in Zagreb at 6:22 AM (CET). The fifth aftershock came on 29 December 2020 from an earthquake in Petrinja. On 3 March 2021, the most recent ever aftershock was reported.

== See also ==
- Timeline of Sarajevo
- Austro-Hungarian rule in Bosnia and Herzegovina (1878–1918)
- Bosnian Crisis (1908–09)
- Assassination of Archduke Franz Ferdinand (1914)
- Anti-Serb riots in Sarajevo (1914)

== Sources ==
- Balić, Emily Greble (Spring 2009). "When Croatia Needed Serbs: Nationalism and Genocide in Sarajevo, 1941-1942". Slavic Review. 68 (1): 116–138.
- Robert J. Donia (2006). Sarajevo: A Biography. University of Michigan Press. pp. 11–. ISBN 0-472-11557-X.
- Dževad Juzbašić (1997). Papers on history of Sarajevo. Inst. za Istoriju.
- Donia, Robert J. (2006). Sarajevo: A Biography. London: C. Hurst and Co. (Publishers) Ltd. ISBN 0-472-11557-X.
- Malcolm, Noel (1996). Bosnia: A Short History. New York City: NYU Press. ISBN 0814755615.
- Motadel, David (December 2013). "The "Muslim Question" in Hitler's Balkans". The Historical Journal. 56 (4): 1007–1039.
- Glenny, Misha (2001). The Balkans: Nationalism, War & the Great Powers, 1804–1999. New York City: Penguin Books. ISBN 0140233776.
- Zeinar, Hubert (2006). Geschichte des Österreichischen Generalstabes (in German). Vienna: Böhlau Verlag. ISBN 3-205-77415-9.
- Lackey, Scott (1995). The Rebirth of the Habsburg Army. Friedrich Beck and the Rise of the General Staff. ABC-CLIO. ISBN 0313031312.
