= List of mayors of Sarajevo =

Mayor of Sarajevo
- Gradonačelnik Sarajeva
- The Coat of arms of Sarajevo

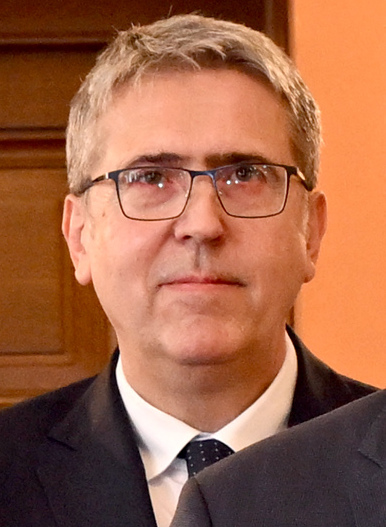
- Incumbent; Samir Avdić since 16 July 2025
- Seat: Vijećnica
- Appointer: Sarajevo City Council
- Term length: Four years, renewable
- Inaugural holder: Mustafa Fadilpašić
- Formation: 22 August 1878
- Salary: 1,510 EUR per month
- Website: City of Sarajevo website

This is a list of people who have served as mayor or president of the city council of the city of Sarajevo, the capital of Bosnia and Herzegovina. Sarajevo has had 40 different mayors in 41 different mayorships since the position was created on 22 August 1878, upon Austro-Hungarian occupation.

== History ==
The first mayor of Sarajevo Mustafa Fadilpašić was also the city's longest-served mayor, having remained in office for 14 years. The first non-Muslim mayor was Aristotel Petrović, who served from 1918 until 1920. The only mayor to serve more than once was Edhem Bičakčić, who was mayor from 1928 to 1929, and once again from 1935 to 1939. Fehim Čurčić, the city's fifth mayor, served during World War I. In 1941, Atih Hadžikadić was elected mayor, a position that was short-lived as he was hanged during World War II in August 1941. Semiha Borovac became Sarajevo's first female mayor in 2005.

The current, 41st mayor of the city is Samir Avdić, serving since 16 July 2025.

== Mayors ==
Yugoslav Muslim Organization League of Communists Party of Democratic Action Social Democratic Party Social Democratic Union People and Justice

Portrait	Name (Birth–Death)	Term of office		Political party
Portrait	Name (Birth–Death)	Took office	Left office	Political party
1	Mustafa Fadilpašić (1830–1892)	22 August 1878	6 December 1892	
2	Mehmed Kapetanović (1839–1902)	1893	April 1899	
3	Nezir Škaljić (1844–1905)	1899	10 March 1905	
4	Esad Kulović (1854–1917)	1905	14 November 1910	Progressive Muslim Party
5	Fehim Čurčić (1866–1916)	29 December 1910	1915	
6	Aristotel Petrović (1881–1920)	2 December 1918	November 1920	
7	Ljudevit Novat (1871–?)	1920	1922	
8	Ibrahim Hadžiomerović (1886–?)	1922	1927	
9	Edhem Bičakčić (1884–1941)	October 1928	1929	JMO
10	Asim-beg Mutevelić (1883–1956)	1929	1935	
11	Ibrahim Šarić (1882–1939)	1935	1935	
(9)	Edhem Bičakčić (1884–1941)	1935	c. March 1939	JMO
12	Muhamed Zlatar (1890–1943)	c. March 1939	1941	
13	Atih Hadžikadić (1884–1941)	1941	August 1941	
14	Hasan Demirović (1897–1976)	August 1941	May 1942	
15	Mustafa Softić (1898–1990)	May 1942	1945	
16	Husein Brkić (1889–1961)	1945	1947	KP BiH
17	Ferid Čengić (1910–1986)	1947	1948	KP BiH
18	Dane Olbina (1919–2011)	1948	1955	KP BiH renamed in 1952 to SK BiH
19	Ljubo Kojo (1920–1993)	1955	1962	SK BiH
20	Lazo Materić (1920–1999)	1962	1963	SK BiH
21	Vaso Radić (1923–2011)	1963	1965	SK BiH
22	Salko Lagumdžija (1921–1973)	1965	16 May 1967	SK BiH
23	Džemal Muminagić (1920–2003)	16 May 1967	10 March 1973	SK BiH
24	Dane Maljković (1927–2016)	10 March 1973	1975	SK BiH
25	Anto Sučić (1929–1985)	1975	1981	SK BiH
26	Emerik Blum (1911–1984)	1981	1983	SK BiH
27	Uglješa Uzelac (1938–1997)	1983	1985	SK BiH
28	Kemal Hanjalić (b. 1939)	1985	1987	SK BiH
29	Salko Selimović (1935–2017)	1987	1989	SK BiH
30	Juraj Martinović (1936–2021)	1989	1990	SK BiH
31	Muhamed Kreševljaković (1939–2001)	December 1990	April 1994	SDA
32	Tarik Kupusović (b. 1952)	April 1994	February 1997	SDA
33	Rasim Gačanović (b. 1950)	February 1997	April 2000	SDA
34	Muhidin Hamamdžić (b. 1936)	April 2000	16 April 2005	SDP BiH
35	Semiha Borovac (b. 1955)	16 April 2005	28 January 2009	SDA
36	Alija Behmen (1940–2018)	28 January 2009	27 March 2013	SDP BiH
37	Ivo Komšić (b. 1948)	27 March 2013	6 February 2017	SDU BiH (until 2013); USD (2013–2014)
	Ivo Komšić (b. 1948)	27 March 2013	6 February 2017	SDP BiH (from 2014)
38	Abdulah Skaka (b. 1983)	6 February 2017	8 April 2021	SDA
39	Benjamina Karić (b. 1991)	8 April 2021	18 November 2024	SDP BiH
40	Predrag Puharić (b. 1977)	29 November 2024	16 July 2025	SDP BiH
41	Samir Avdić (b. 1967)	16 July 2025	Incumbent	NiP

== See also ==
- History of Sarajevo
  - Timeline of Sarajevo
