= Alagić =

Alagić is a South Slavic surname, found in Bosnia and Serbia. There's also an anglicized version Alagich.

Notable people with the name include:

- Amir Alagić (born 1960), Bosnian-Australian football manager
- Haris Alagic (born 1990s), Dutch singer-songwriter and guitarist of Bosnian descent
- Mara Alagic, Serbian mathematician
- Mehmed Alagić (1947–2003), Bosnian general
- Sanjin Alagić (born 1977), Bosnian football player and manager
- Strahinja Alagić (1924–2002), Serbian basketball player and coach
- Tea Alagic (born 1972), Bosnian-American stage director

== See also ==
- Alaga
- Atlagić
