= Alaga =

Alaga is a surname found in Europe and Africa.

Notable people with the name include:

- Gaja Alaga (1924–1988), Croatian physicist
- Humuani Alaga (ca. 1900–1993), Nigerian activist and entrepreneur

== See also ==
- Alagić
- Aga (title)
- Al-Aga Mosque
