= Muslim Independent Party =

Muslim Independent Party may refer to:

- Muslim Independent Party (Bosnia and Herzegovina)
- Muslim Independent Party (India)
