= Nezir Škaljić =

Bosnian politician (1844–1905)

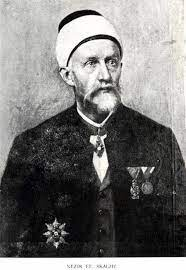

3rd Mayor of Sarajevo
- In office 1899 – 10 March 1905
- Preceded by: Mehmed Kapetanović
- Succeeded by: Esad Kulović

Personal details
- Born: 23 February 1844 Rogatica, Bosnia Eyalet, Ottoman Empire
- Died: 10 March 1905 (aged 61) Sarajevo, Condominium of Bosnia and Herzegovina, Austria-Hungary

Nezir Škaljić (Serbo-Croatian Cyrillic: Незир Шкаљић; 23 February 1844 – 10 March 1905) was a Bosnian Muslim politician who served as the third mayor of Sarajevo from 1899 to 1905. Škaljić was a jurist, previously serving as judge of Bosnia's Supreme Court and President of the Commercial Court. His governance coincided with Austro-Hungarian rule of Bosnia. Škaljić was recipient of a first class 'Grand Cross' Imperial Austrian Order of Franz Joseph.

As jurist and judge, Nezir Škaljić’s work left a mark on the South Slavic, Czech and Russian legal systems.

Škaljić was a member of a three-member Commission that was preparing the reform of the judicial system in Habsburg occupied Bosnia and Herzegovina. From the autumn of 1881 to the middle of 1882, he lived and worked in Vienna. Other members of the Commission included: Baron von Krauss (Jurist), Kajetan von Mérey, Hauptmann-Auditor Spaczil, and later dr. Karl Krall, the Hungarian representative August Gottel and Eduard Eichler.

Škaljić was considered an expert in Islamic and commercial law, having previously served as the President of the Commercial Court and Judge of Bosnia's Supreme Court in Sarajevo. He thus had a great influence on the transformation of the courts in Bosnia and Herzegovina - these were newly two-tiered (several Khotari courts and one chief in Sarajevo) and acquired jurisdiction only for family and inheritance law. He himself participated in a partial translation of the Ottoman Civil Code, Mecelle, into the Bosnian language. These solutions were later adopted by other countries and jurisdictions.

As mayor of Sarajevo, Škaljić initiated important modernization works in Sarajevo. This includes the development of asphalt, first surrounding Sacred Heart Cathedral and later throughout the city, as well as the modern sewage and waterworks system.

He opened the People's Spa Bentbaša (bos. narodna banja Bentbaša), on 20 July 1902. The spa is still in operation. Also during Škaljić's term in office, the Ashkenazi synagogue in Sarajevo was finally completed (1902).

Škaljić held office in the newly constructed Sarajevo City Hall (bos. Vijećnica), then the largest and most representative building of the Austro-Hungarian period in Sarajevo, which served as the town hall.

== Early life ==
Škaljić was born and educated in the eastern Bosnian town of Rogatica. He became a local judge in his birth-town as well as the towns of Fojnica and Srebrenica.

He was married to Vasvija Selmanagić. The pair had three sons.

== Political career ==
Škaljić was one of the four founding fathers of the independent 'Islamic Community in Bosnia and Herzegovina' (Bosnian: Rijaset Islamske Zajednice BiH). Its creation enabled Bosniak religious and political emancipation from the Ottoman Empire.

In 1899, Škaljić took over as mayor of Sarajevo when Mehmed Kapetanović was forced to step down due to ill health.

== Family history ==
The Škaljić family emigrated to Sarajevo from Škaljari, their settlement in the Bay of Kotor during the Battle of Perast (1654) fought between the Venetian Republic and the Ottoman Empire. From the 14th century, Kotor existed as an independent republic known as Republic of Cattaro, occasionally falling under protectorate regimes of the Croats, Bosnians or Hungarians. The Venetians ruled the area for the longest period of time, almost four centuries starting in 1420. Their legacy is the most enduring and it's what won Kotor and Perast their place in the UNESCO World Heritage sites list.

Once in Sarajevo, the Škaljić's bought large portions of land "stretching from the outskirts of Sarajevo to Rogatica in eastern Bosnia". They excelled in trade. According to 18th century chronicler Mula Mustafa Bašeskija, the Škaljić's were known as ''merchants of the German-speaking world''.

Other Škaljić's were political leaders, religious and legal scholars. One of Sarajevo's streets still bears the family name–'Škaljića sokak'.

Nezir Škaljić's great-grandson is modern-day Bosnian politician Fehim Škaljić.

Other Škaljić family members include Abdulah Škaljić, the Balkan linguist and author of the book Turcisms in Serbo-Croatian language (bos. Turcizmi u srpsko-hrvatskom jeziku), first published in 1966. The book has since been published in ten editions, and is still considered "a unique and irreplaceable" source for the study of South Slavic language and culture.

Political offices
Preceded by Mehmed Kapetanović	Mayor of Sarajevo; 1899–1905	Succeeded by Esad Kulović
