= Aristotel Petrović =

Bosnian politician (1881–1920)

Aristotel Petrović Аристотел Петровић

6th Mayor of Sarajevo
- In office 2 December 1918 – November 1920
- Preceded by: Fehim Čurčić
- Succeeded by: Ljudevit Novat

Personal details
- Born: 1881 Sarajevo, Condominium of Bosnia and Herzegovina, Austria-Hungary
- Died: 1920 (aged 38–39)

Aristotel Petrović (Serbian Cyrillic: Аристотел Петровић; 1881–1920) was a Bosnian politician who served as the 6th mayor of Sarajevo from 1918 to 1920. He was Sarajevo's mayor first post-World War I and in the Kingdom of Serbs, Croats and Slovenes.

== Biography ==
Petrović was born to a family of Serb merchants in Sarajevo, Bosnia and Herzegovina. His father Petar Petrović was a Serb from Korçë, Albania who self-identified as ethnically Greek and gave his three sons (Aristotel, Diogen and Sokrat) Greek names.

After the World War I ended in 1918, Petrović was elected mayor of Sarajevo on 2 December of that year, and served until Ljudevit Novat was elected in the November 1920 elections, although he had attempted to resign in May 1920.

Petrović was the city's first mayor in the Kingdom of Serbs, Croats and Slovenes.

Political offices
Preceded by Fehim Čurčić	Mayor of Sarajevo; 1918–1920	Succeeded by Ljudevit Novat
