= Alagich =

Alagich (/ˈæləɡɪtʃ/ AL-ə-gitch) is a surname, cognate to South Slavic Alagić. Notable people with the surname include:

- Dianne Alagich (born 1979), Australian soccer player
- Richie Alagich (born 1973), Australian soccer player
