= Ismet Rizvić =

Ismet Rizvić (Mostar, 1933 – Sarajevo 1992) was a Bosnian artist.

== Life ==
Rizvić was born in Mostar in 1933, but spent much of his life, and all of his working life, in Sarajevo, where he studied the fine arts at the Pedagogical Academy. As a scholarship-holder, he spent time in London in 1966, studying the English watercolourists. Rizvić worked between 1963 and 1982 as a primary school teacher. He died on 9 December 1992 in Sarajevo.

== Work ==
Rizvić first exhibited his works with the Bosnia and Herzegovina Artists' Association in 1957. He was a member of the Visual Artists' Association of Bosnia & Herzegovina from 1963. During his thirty-five years' work as an artist, he tool part in numerous joint exhibitions and held ten solo exhibitions. The Bosniak Institute has a collection of his work. Many of Rizvić's works are in private collections in Bosnia and around the world. In 2004, a monograph on the artist Ismet Rizvić was published, with 384 pages including 237 reproductions of his works.
