= Ljubo Kojo =

Yugoslav politician (1920–1993)

Ljubo Kojo Љубо Којо
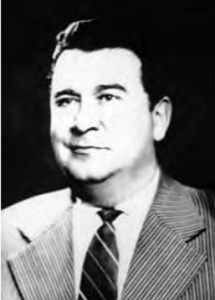
- Kojo in 1955

19th Mayor of Sarajevo
- In office 1955–1962
- Preceded by: Dane Olbina
- Succeeded by: Lazo Materić

Personal details
- Born: Ljubomir Kojo; 3 August 1920 Sarajevo, Kingdom of Serbs, Croats and Slovenes
- Died: 19 April 1993 (aged 72) Belgrade, Serbia, FR Yugoslavia
- Party: Communist League of Yugoslavia
- Education: University of Sarajevo

Ljubomir "Ljubo" Kojo (Serbo-Croatian Cyrillic: Љубо Којо; 3 August 1920 – 19 April 1993) was a Yugoslav politician who served as the 19th mayor of Sarajevo from 1955 to 1962.

== Early life ==
Kojo was born into a prominent Bosnian Serb family on 3 August 1920 in Sarajevo, Bosnia and Herzegovina, which was then a part of the Kingdom of Yugoslavia. He received his high school education in the Sarajevo Academy of Commerce. With the Axis invasion of Yugoslavia and the formation of the NDH puppet state in 1941, he joined the Yugoslav Partisans. After being gravely wounded in battle, he was transferred to a military hospital in Bari, Italy where he recovered on the eve of the liberation of Sarajevo.

== Political career ==
After returning to Sarajevo, Kojo was named Administrator of the People's goods, an institution set-up after the war to ration food and basic utilities. He further held the positions of alderman, Sarajevo city committee vice-chairman and the mayor of Sarajevo from 1955 to 1962. Between 1962 and 1966, he was a minister in the government of the Socialist Republic of Bosnia and Herzegovina. In 1969, he was named representative of the Bosnian Chamber of Commerce in Moscow, a position he held for two years. He was one of the founders of prominent football club FK Sarajevo, and held the position of the club's president of the assembly from 1962 to 1963. He spent his latter years as director of the Skenderija center.

== Death ==
Kojo died on 19 April 1993 in Belgrade, Serbia, FR Yugoslavia.

Political offices
Preceded by Dane Olbina	Mayor of Sarajevo; 1955–1962	Succeeded by Lazo Materić
