= Fehim Škaljić =

- Born: 9 September 1949 (age 76); Sarajevo, PR Bosnia and Herzegovina, FPR Yugoslavia
- Occupation: Politician

Fehim Škaljić (born 9 September 1949) is a retired Bosnian politician. He was member of Parliamentary Assembly of Bosnia and Herzegovina from 2014–2018.

Previously, Škaljić was Speaker of the Parliament of the Federation of Bosnia and Herzegovina.

Škaljić is a President of the Board of the Bosniak Institute, a philanthropic and research foundation established by the late Bosniak intellectual and politician Adil Zulfikarpašić.

== Career ==
Škaljić studied mechanical engineering and political science at the University of Sarajevo. He has had a career in both business and politics.

As a member of the Parliamentary Assembly of Bosnia and Herzegovina, he was part of the delegation to the Parliamentary Assembly of the Central European Initiative (CEI), the oldest forum of regional cooperation in Central, Eastern and South Eastern Europe. At CEI, Škaljić focused on facilitating greater regional cooperation via business and tourism initiatives.

He also served on the BiH Parliamentary Assembly’s Committee on the election of the BiH Council of Ministers and the Transport and Communication Committee.

As Speaker of the Parliament of the Federation of BiH (FBiH House of Peoples) Škaljić succeeded in passing important legislation including updates to the Law on notaries of Federation of Bosnia and Herzegovina, and initiating changes to the FBiH Constitution.

From 2000-2004, he served as the mayor of Stari Grad, Sarajevo. In this capacity, Škaljić lead a number of infrastructure and cultural projects that helped the city recover from the destruction caused by Bosnian war 1992-1995. Mr. Škaljić was part of a team that helped reconstruct the Gazi Husrev Bey Library, originally built in 1537 and completely destroyed in the latest war. He is also credited with the reconstruction of the Austro-Hungarian Music Pavilion (bos. Muzički paviljon u Sarajevu); the first phases of the reconstruction of the National and University Library of Bosnia and Herzegovina.

Škaljić initiated several de-mining project in Sarajevo and helped re-establish links to the Bosnian Serb community. For his service to the community, Mr. Škaljić was recognized with several prizes and honors.

== Family ==
The Škaljić family emigrated to Sarajevo from Škaljari, their settlement in the Bay of Kotor during the Battle of Perast (1654) fought between the Venetian Republic and Ottoman Empire. From 14th century, Kotor existed as an independent republic, known as Republic of Cattaro, occasionally falling under protectorate regimes of the Croats, Bosnians or Hungarians. The Venetians ruled the area for the longest period of time, almost four centuries starting in 1420. Their legacy is the most enduring and it’s what won Kotor and Perast their place in the UNESCO World Heritage sites list.

Once in Sarajevo, the family bought large portions of land "stretching from the outskirts of Sarajevo to Rogatica in Eastern Bosnia". They excelled in trade. According to 18th century chronicler Mula Mustafa Bašeskija, the Škaljić's were known as ''merchants of the German-speaking world''.

Other Škaljić's were political leaders, religious and legal scholars. One of Sarajevo's streets still bears the family name—'Škaljića sokak'.

Fehim Škaljić's great-grandfather was Nezir Škaljić, 3rd Mayor of Sarajevo, 1899 - 1905.

Other Škaljić family members include Abdulah ef. Škaljić, the Balkan linguist and author of the book Turcisms in Serbo-Croatian language (bos. Turcizmi u srpsko-hrvatskom jeziku), first published in 1966. The book has since been published in ten editions, and is still considered "a unique and irreplaceable" source for the study of South Slavic language and culture.

Fehim Škaljić is married and has three children.

== Notes ==
- Official website of the Parliament of the Federation of Bosnia and Herzegovina
