= Edhem Bičakčić =

Bosnian politician (1884–1941)

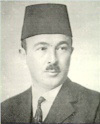

9th Mayor of Sarajevo
- In office 1935 – c. March 1939
- Preceded by: Ibrahim Šarić
- Succeeded by: Muhamed Zlatar
- In office October 1928 – 1929
- Preceded by: Ibrahim Hadžiomerović
- Succeeded by: Asim-beg Mutevelić

Personal details
- Born: 3 May 1884 Sarajevo, Condominium of Bosnia and Herzegovina, Austria-Hungary
- Died: 31 December 1941 (aged 57) Sarajevo, Kingdom of Yugoslavia
- Party: Yugoslav Muslim Organization
- Spouse: Razija Bičakčić

Edhem Bičakčić (3 May 1884 – 31 December 1941) was a Bosnian politician who served as the 9th mayor of Sarajevo from 1928 to 1929 and from 1935 to 1939. The only mayor of Sarajevo to serve two non-consecutive terms, he was a close associate of Mehmed Spaho and a member of the Yugoslav Muslim Organization.

== Early life and family ==
Bičakčić was born on 3 May 1884 in Sarajevo, Austria-Hungary, in what is today Bosnia and Herzegovina, to a Bosniak merchant family. His paternal uncle Salih Bičakčić was an Ottoman statesman and one of the leaders of the resistance against the Austro-Hungarian Empire. For his involvement in the resistance, Edhem's uncle was tried before the court-martial of General Josip Filipović, and eventually acquitted due to lack of evidence. Following the acquittal, Salih returned to Sarajevo where he and his brother, Edhem's father, established several banks in Bosnia and Herzegovina. Young Edhem worked on the construction of a small hydropower plant in Hrid, near Sarajevo, on the banks of the Miljacka river.

== World War I ==
CBS News and the Associated Press reported in 2010 that a postcard sent by Bičakčić, dated 13 June 1915, was discovered by a retired jeweler who purchased it at an antique fair in Long Beach, California. Bičakčić had sent a black-and-white photograph as a postcard to his wife Razija, parents and daughters Zekija and Čamka while serving in Hungary during World War I from the town Villány. The Bosnian American jeweler who discovered the postcard after 95 years, was visiting his native Sarajevo in June 2010 when he coincidentally met Bičakčić's grandson while looking around a local antique shop in downtown Sarajevo. Because the grandson had the same last surname as Edhem Bičakčić, the jeweler presented the postcard to the grandson, who immediately recognized his grandfather on the photograph.

== Political career ==
Bičakčić was elected as the 9th mayor of Sarajevo in October 1928, taking over for Ibrahim Hadžiomerović. His term lasted one year. He was re-elected as mayor in 1935 and stayed on post until c. March 1939. Bičakčić is the only mayor of Sarajevo to serve two non-consecutive terms.

== Death ==
Bičakčić died suddenly of a heart attack on 31 December 1941 in Sarajevo, aged 57.

Political offices
Preceded by Ibrahim Hadžiomerović	Mayor of Sarajevo; 1928–1929	Succeeded by Asim-beg Mutevelić
Preceded by Ibrahim Šarić	Mayor of Sarajevo; 1935–1939	Succeeded by Muhamed Zlatar
