= Esad Kulović =

Bosnian politician (1854–1917)

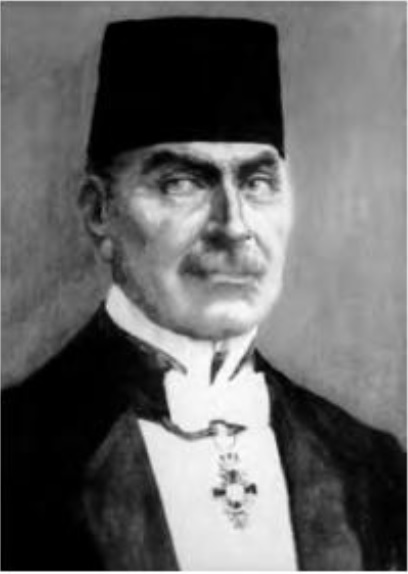
- Čurčić in c. 1905

4th Mayor of Sarajevo
- In office 1905 – 14 November 1910
- Preceded by: Nezir Škaljić
- Succeeded by: Fehim Čurčić

Personal details
- Born: 1854 Sarajevo, Bosnia Eyalet, Ottoman Empire
- Died: 22 July 1917 (aged 62–63) Sarajevo, Bosnia and Herzegovina, Austria-Hungary
- Party: Party of Rights (before 1908) Muslim Independent Party (1908–1917)

Esad Kulović (1854 – 22 July 1917) was a Bosnian Muslim politician who served as the fourth mayor of Sarajevo from 1905 to 1910. He was mayor during the Bosnian Crisis of 1908.

== Early life ==
Kulović was born to an old and prominent Bosnian Muslim family of Janissaries in the city of Sarajevo, Bosnia and Herzegovina, while it was part of the Ottoman Empire. His father was the only son of Sarajevo's qadi, Sulejman Ruždija Kulović, after whom a street was named in Ottoman times. Kulović was raised in the neighbourhood which bore his father's name, and where he eventually built a large house.

Kulović was well-educated; in addition to his native Serbo-Croatian, he spoke Turkish, Arabic, Persian and French.

== Political career ==
In 1884, Kulović was elected the municipality representative of Sarajevo. He became mayor of Sarajevo in 1905. He was the mayor during the 1908 Bosnian Crisis, when Austria-Hungary annexed Bosnia and Herzegovina from the Ottoman Empire. Kulović won a third term in office in the 1910 election by an "overwhelming" majority, but refused the post post, thus the position was handed over to 44-year-old Fehim Čurčić.

Kulović established the city branch of the Croatian nationalist Party of Rights, in Sarajevo.

== Family ==
Kulović's son, Sead Kulović (1897 – 1945) was the president of the Bosnian Muslim cultural association "People's Hope" (Narodna uzdanica) and a prominent Croatian nationalist. During the Independent State of Croatia (NDH), a World War II Axis puppet state, Sead served as a commissioner for Eastern Bosnia and a mayor of Tuzla.

== See also ==
- List of mayors of Sarajevo
- Bosnian crisis

== Bibliography ==
- Memišević, Hamza (2024). "Novopazarski sandžak u percepciji hrvatske muslimanske nacionalističke inteligencije: slučaj Kasima Hadžića (1938. – 1945.)" [The Sanjak of Novi Pazar in the perception of the Croatian muslim nationalist intelligentsia: the case of Kasim Hadžić (1938-1945)]. Časopis za suvremenu povijest (in Croatian). Zagreb.

Political offices
Preceded by Nezir Škaljić	Mayor of Sarajevo; 1905–1910	Succeeded by Fehim Čurčić
