= Grimmenstein =

- Municipality
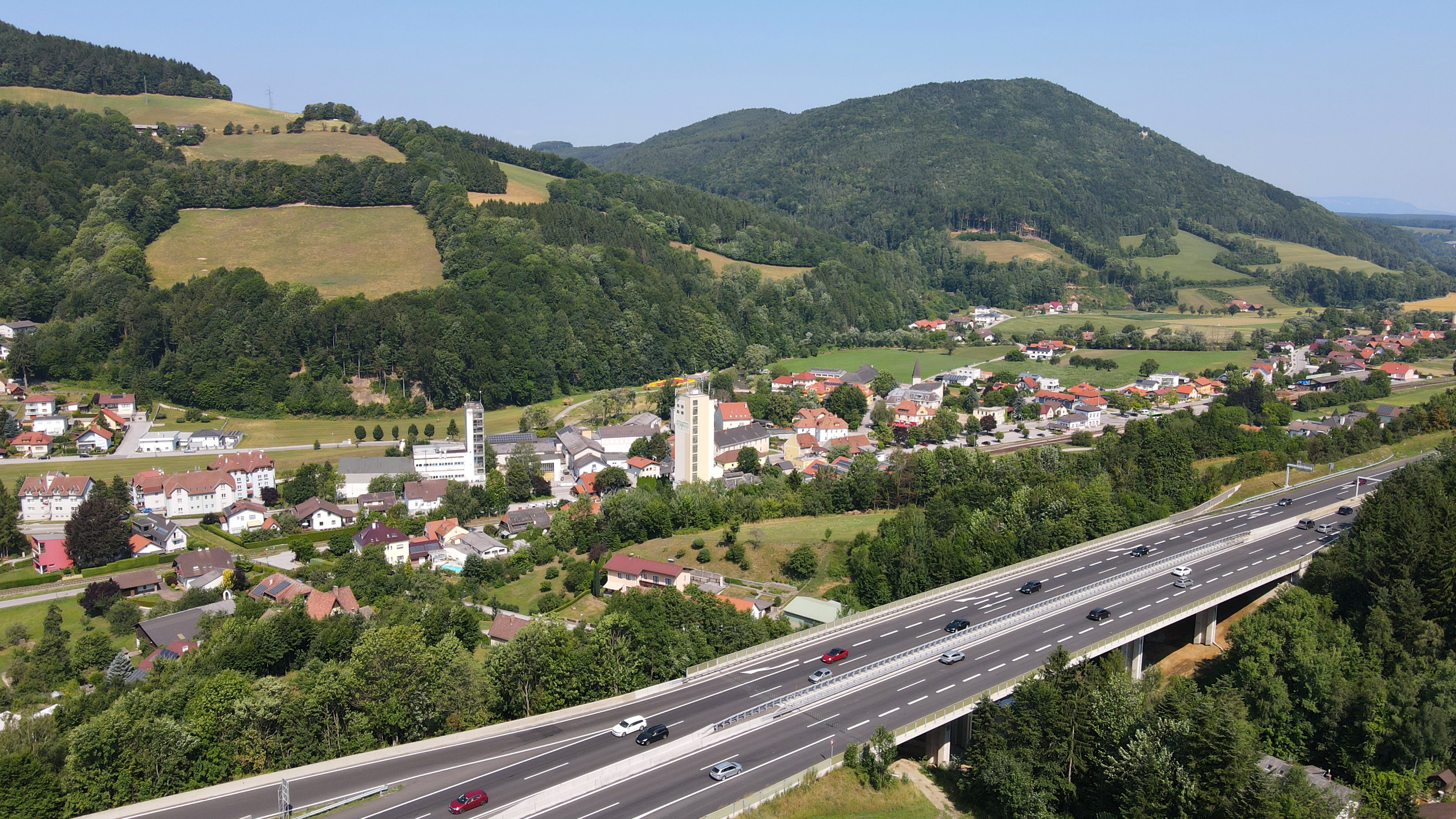
- Aerial view of Grimmenstein

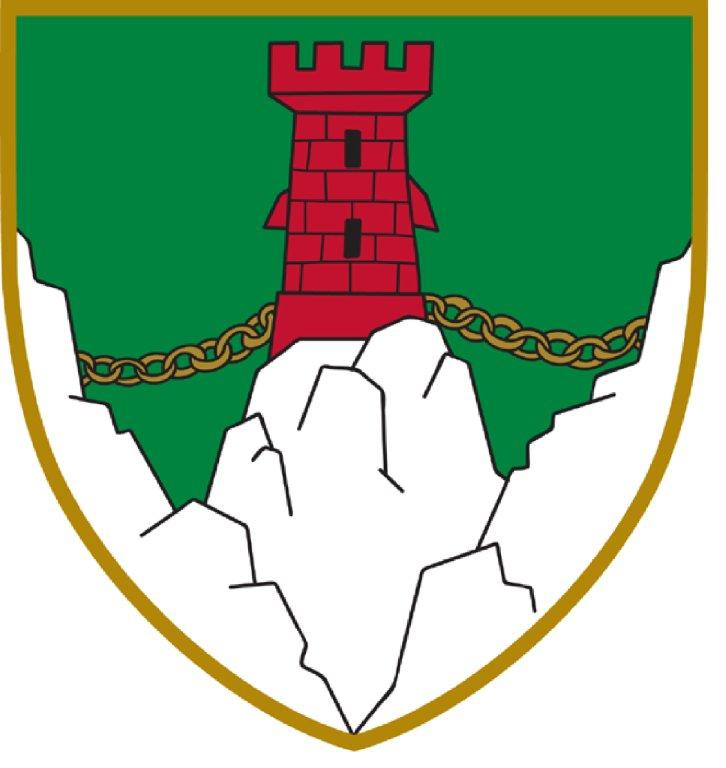
- Coat of arms

- Location within Austria
- Coordinates: 47°37′N 16°8′E
- Country: Austria
- State: Lower Austria
- District: Neunkirchen

Government
  - Mayor: Engelbert Pichler

Area
  - Total: 14.78 km^{2} (5.71 sq mi)
- Elevation: 405 m (1,329 ft)

Population (2018-01-01)
  - Total: 1,348
  - Density: 91.20/km^{2} (236.2/sq mi)
- Time zone: UTC+1 (CET)
  - Summer (DST): UTC+2 (CEST)
- Postal code: 2840
- Area code: 02644
- Website: www.grimmenstein.gv.at

Grimmenstein is a town in the district of Neunkirchen in the Austrian state of Lower Austria.

== Population ==
Historical population
Year	Pop.	±%
1869	772	—
1880	777	+0.6%
1890	774	−0.4%
1900	785	+1.4%
1910	973	+23.9%
1923	1,223	+25.7%
1934	1,293	+5.7%
1939	1,314	+1.6%
1951	1,307	−0.5%
1961	1,367	+4.6%
1971	1,485	+8.6%
1981	1,347	−9.3%
1991	1,384	+2.7%
2001	1,347	−2.7%
2011	1,339	−0.6%
