= Sarajevo City Council =

Elected body in Sarajevo, Bosnia and Herzegovina

Sarajevo City Council Gradsko vijeće Grada Sarajeva

Type
- Type: Unicameral deliberative assembly of Sarajevo

Leadership
- Speaker: Alen Girt (NS) since 16 July 2025
- Deputy speakers: Emir Bićo (NiP); Svjetlana Šošić (SDP BiH)

Structure
- Seats: 28
- Political groups: Majority (16) SDP BiH (7) NS (5) NiP (4) Minority (12) SDA (5) DF (4) SBiH (3)
- Length of term: 4 years

Elections
- Voting system: Proportional representation
- Last election: 6 October 2024

Meeting place
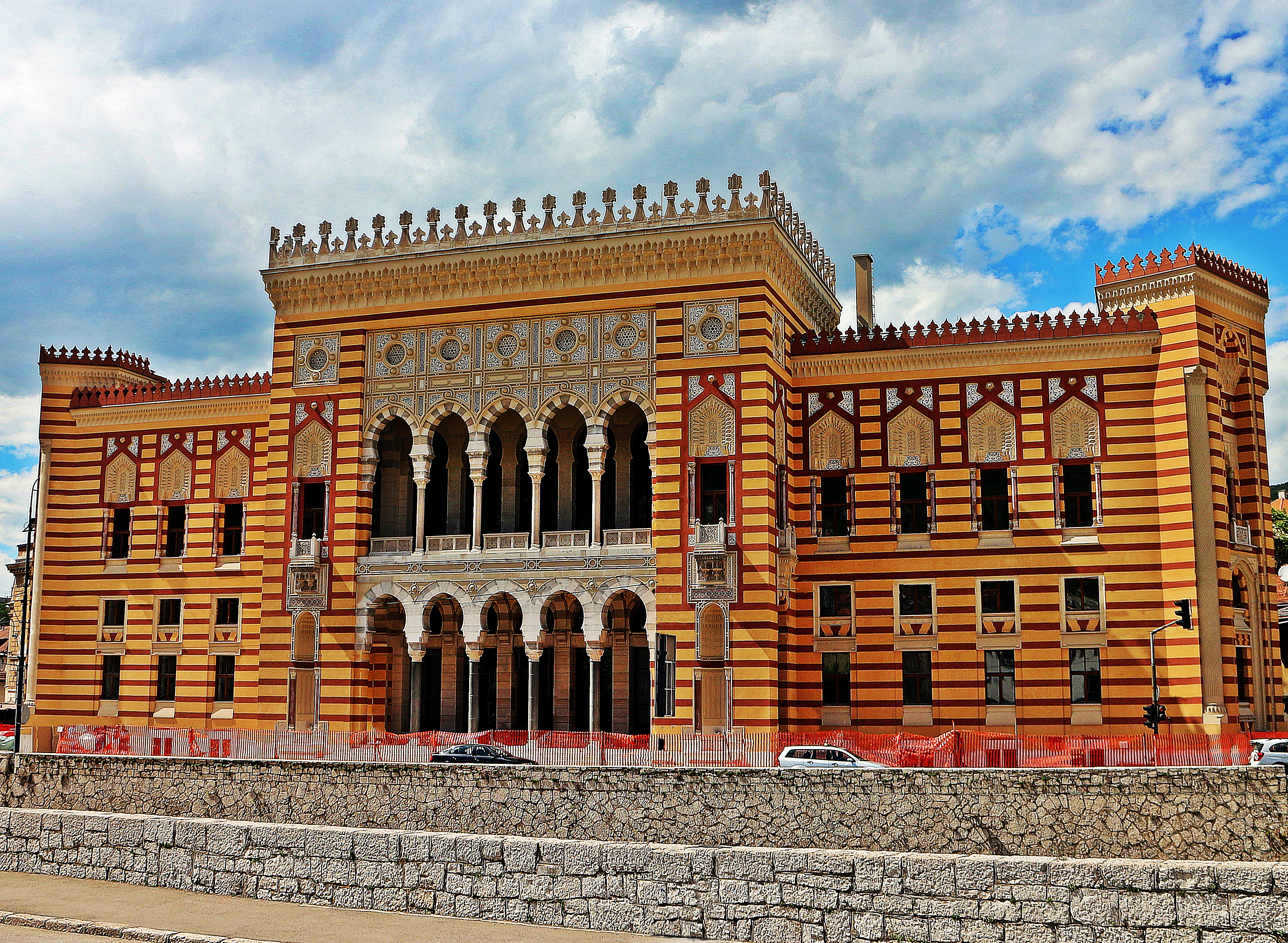
- Vijećnica, Sarajevo

Website
- gradskovijece.sarajevo.ba

The Sarajevo City Council (Bosnian: Gradsko vijeće Grada Sarajeva) is a 28-member elected body that scrutinises the activities of the mayor of Sarajevo and has the power, with a two-thirds super-majority, to amend the mayor's annual budget and to reject the mayor's draft statutory strategies.

The City Council meets at Vijećnica on the bank of the Miljacka river. The council is also able to publish its findings and recommendations, and make proposals to the mayor.

== City Council Members ==
The City Council comprises 28 City Council Members, including a council speaker, two deputies, and a secretary, elected by each municipal council of municipalities that make up the City of Sarajevo, electing seven delegates to the council from among the municipal councilors, with 15 seats needed for a majority. Elections take place every four years – at the same time as for the rest of Bosnia and Herzegovina.

Bosniaks, Croats and Serbs, as constituent peoples, are individually guaranteed a minimum of 20% of the seats in the City Council, while the group of Others are individually guaranteed at least two seats, regardless of all election results.

=== Structure of the City Council ===
Political party	City Council members					
Political party	2012	2016	2020	2024	2025	
Social Democratic Party	7	1	3	7	7	7 / 28
Our Party	4	4	5	5	5	5 / 28
Party of Democratic Action	6	8	4	5	5	5 / 28
People and Justice	0	0	7	4	4	4 / 28
Democratic Front	0	1	1	4	4	4 / 28
Party for Bosnia and Herzegovina	2	0	0	3	3	3 / 28
Bosnian Party	0	1	1	0	0	0 / 28
People's European Union	0	0	1	0	0	0 / 28
Alliance for Stari Grad	1	2	1	0	0	0 / 28
Union of Social Democrats	0	1	1	0	0	0 / 28
Union for a Better Future	2	3	0	0	0	0 / 28
Independent	6	7	4	0	0	0 / 28

== Responsibilities ==
The City Council is responsible for carrying out the policies and decisions:

- adopts the City Statute
- makes decisions, other regulations and general acts and gives their interpretation
- adopts the rules of procedure of the City Council
- elects and dismisses the Speaker of the City Council, Deputy Speakers of the City Council, members of the working bodies of the City Council and the Secretary of the City Council
- elects and dismisses the Mayor and Deputy Mayors
- adopts the budget of the City of Sarajevo and adopts the report on the execution of the budget of the City of Sarajevo and the final account of the budget of the City of Sarajevo at the proposal of the Mayor
- adopts development programs for individual activities for which it is responsible
- enacts implementing regulations, including zoning
- enacts regulations on city taxes and otherwise provides financial resources, in accordance with the law
- manages and disposes of the property of the City of Sarajevo
- establishes public companies and public institutions and other legal entities to perform economic, social, communal and other activities of interest to the City of Sarajevo
- calls a referendum on issues of interest to the City of Sarajevo
- announces a public loan and self-contribution and decides on borrowing by the City of Sarajevo
- enacts a regulation on the establishment and scope of the administrative body of the City of Sarajevo
- gives consent to the rulebook on the internal organization of the administrative bodies of the City of Sarajevo
- performs the tasks of the second instance body, which the Mayor decides on the basis of the regulations of the City of Sarajevo
- enacts regulations in the exercise of delegated powers
- makes decisions on recognitions and awards of the City of Sarajevo
- performs other tasks determined by law and the statute

The City Council supervises the work of the administrative bodies of the City of Sarajevo and has the right to gain insight into the implementation of its decisions, especially when it comes to city revenues and expenditures, and for this purpose the City Council can form a commission that can inspect the files in the premises of the City Administration and to submit a report to the City Council on the results of the inspection.
