= Mustafa Fadilpašić =

Bosnian mayor (1830–1992)

Bey Mustafa Fadilpašić
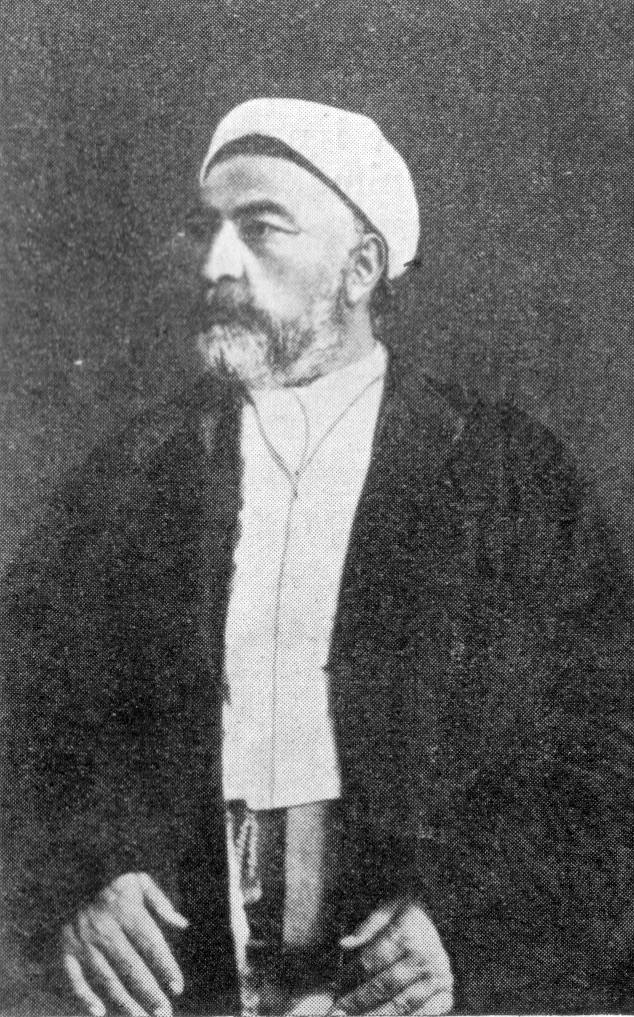

1st Mayor of Sarajevo
- In office 22 August 1878 – 6 December 1892
- Preceded by: Office established
- Succeeded by: Mehmed Kapetanović

Personal details
- Born: Mustafa Šerifović; 6 September 1830 Sarajevo, Bosnia Eyalet, Ottoman Empire
- Died: 6 December 1892 (aged 62) Sarajevo, Condominium of Bosnia and Herzegovina, Austria-Hungary
- Spouse: Nuri Gradaščević

Mustafa Bey Fadilpašić (born Mustafa Šerifović; 6 September 1830 – 6 December 1892) was the first Mayor of Sarajevo, Bosnia and Herzegovina. He was appointed mayor in 1878 after more than 14,000 Austro-Hungarian troops, led by Josip Filipović, captured Bosnia and Herzegovina from the declining Ottoman Empire. He remained the mayor for the last 14 years of his life.

== Early life and family ==
Mustafa Fadilpašić was born in Sarajevo in 1830 under the surname Šerifović, into one of the most respected and wealthiest families in the city and in Bosnia and Herzegovina. His family settled in Sarajevo in the early 18th century from Feodosia in Crimea. They became major landowners at the end of the 18th or in early 19th century. Mustafa was the son of Fadil-pasha Šerifović, a wealthy landowner, poet, calligrapher and political leader. During Ottoman times, the elder Šerifović was the Pasha of Sarajevo. Fadilpašić had a brother named Mahmud. Their brother-in-law was the Travnik dissident Šerif-beg Hafizadić.

It is believed that they were descended from Šerif Ahmed who migrated to Sarajevo around 1750 from the Kefe Eyalet, and it is alleged that he himself was a descendant of the prophet Muhammad

Fadilpašić was raised and educated in the Ottoman capital city Constantinople. He also lived in Egypt before returning to Sarajevo in 1860. Upon his return to Sarajevo, he married Nuri Gradaščević, a woman known as the largest single landowner in Bosnia and Herzegovina and the niece of military leader Husein Gradaščević.

His father died aged 80 on 26 November 1882 in Istanbul, having migrated there when the Habsburg regime took over Bosnia in 1878. He was buried in Üsküdar. Fadilpašić's paternal grandparents were Mustafa Nurudin, who was killed in January 1827, just prior to the Bosnian uprising, and Ćamila Fazlagić (died 1848).

== First Mayor of Sarajevo ==
During the summer of 1878, the Austro-Hungarian army, led by Josip Filipović, began invading Bosnia and Herzegovina. Although met with resistance by the Ottoman Bosnian army, led by their commander Smail Haki-beg Selmanović, the Austro-Hungarians quickly captured the entire region, which had been a part of the weakening Ottoman Empire.

Immediately after the arrival of the Austro-Hungarian government, Fadilpašić was appointed the first mayor of Sarajevo, a position which was originally housed in a building on the left bank of the Miljacka, and later in Bistrik, one of the oldest settlements in the city.

During his governance, Sarajevo underwent noticeable positive changes and Sarajevans were particularly fond of their first mayor. He enacted the first regulatory plan of Sarajevo, which provided protection and revitalization for the historic bazaar Baščaršija. In 1880 he implemented the first wagonettes in Sarajevo. Five years later, he had horse-drawn trams installed.

For the first time in six centuries, in 1881, he reinstated the Catholic Church in Bosnia and Herzegovina. Pope Leo XIII named Josip Štadler the first archbishop of Sarajevo. Around that same time, he commissioned the building of, what is today known as, the Building of the Presidency of Bosnia and Herzegovina, which was designed by Josip Vancaš. Fadilpašić also commissioned the National Museum of Bosnia and Herzegovina, Sacred Heart Cathedral, a Sharia law school, a grammar school and multiple hamams.

Fadilpašić, his father and his brother became the most politically influential Sarajevans near the end of the 19th century.

== Death ==
Having spent the final 14 years of his life as the mayor of Sarajevo, Fadilpašić died on 6 December 1892 at the Vakus Hospital in Sarajevo, where he had been transported after a fit of nausea. He was buried in the Gazi Husrev-beg Mosque.

== Footnotes ==
Political offices
Preceded by Office established	Mayor of Sarajevo; 1878–1892	Succeeded by Mehmed Kapetanović
