= Bosniak Institute =

Cultural centre in Sarajevo, Bosnia & Herzegovina

Bošnjački institut The Bosniak Institute
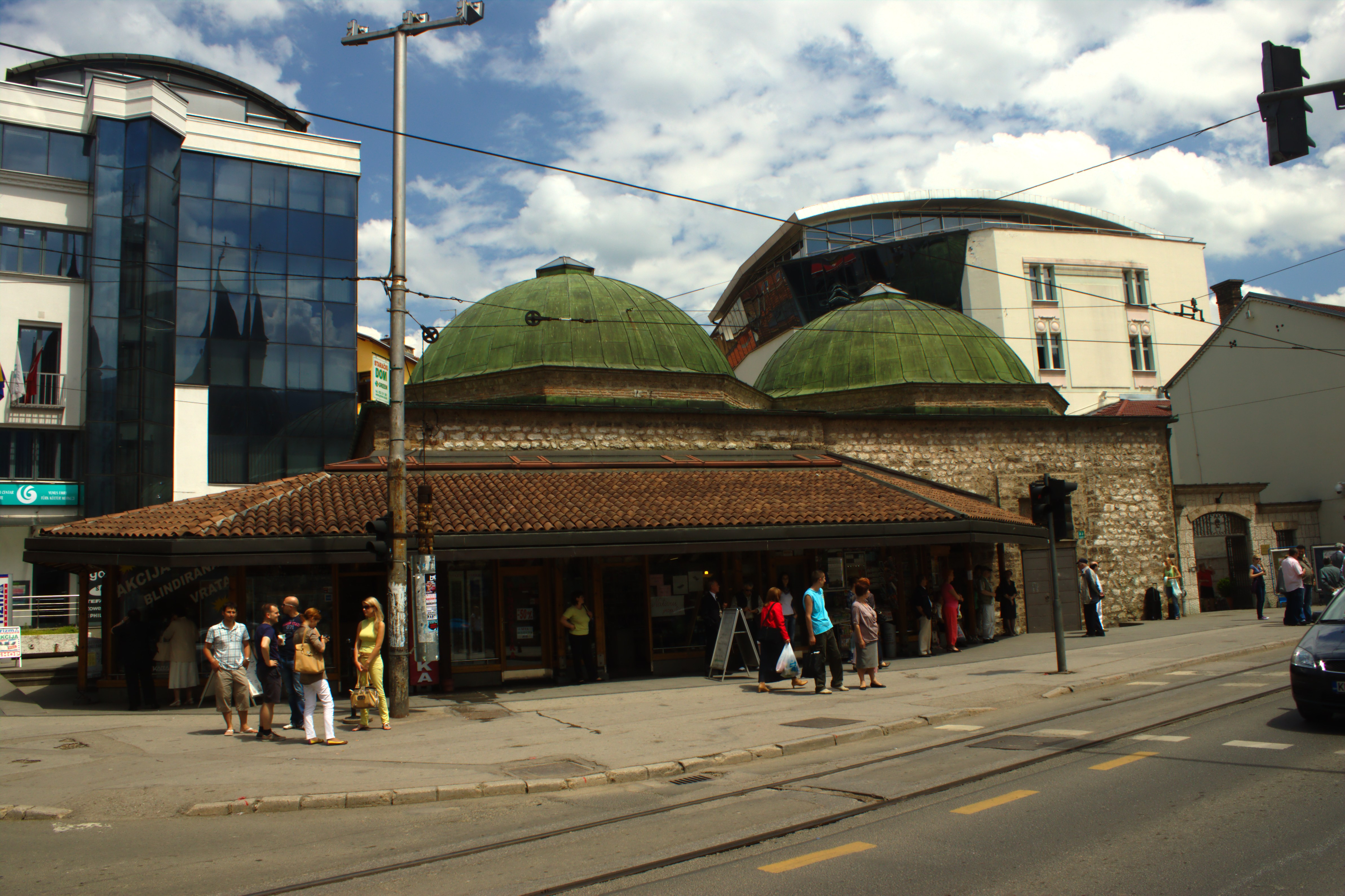
- Founder: Adil Zulfikarpašić
- Established: 1988 (in Switzerland) 2001 (in Bosnia and Herzegovina)
- President: Prof. Dr. Faris Gavrankapetanović
- Staff: 18
- Key people: Fehim Škaljić
- Address: Mula Mustafe Bašeskije 21, Sarajevo 71000
- Location: Sarajevo, Sarajevo Canton, Federation of Bosnia and Herzegovina, Bosnia and Herzegovina
- Website: bosnjackiinstitut.ba

The Bosniak Institute is an institution of culture and scholarship in Sarajevo, Bosnia and Herzegovina. It consists of a museum, gallery, cultural centre, library, and a publishing house. The institute's founder and donor, Adil Zulfikarpašić (waqf), was a businessman, politician, and promotor of cultural and educational life in Bosnia and Herzegovina. With his wife Tatjana Zulfikarpašić, he collected and preserved cultural heritage and contemporary production about Bosnia and Herzegovina, including documents, photographs, postcards, maps, books, encyclopaedias, journals, and other archival and library materials. The Bosniak Institute was founded in Zurich in 1988. The entire stock was moved to Sarajevo after the aggression against Bosnia and Herzegovina and opened in 2001.

The Bosniak Institute includes a library, archive, art collection, galleries, reading rooms, researcher & scholar study rooms, conference rooms, and other amenities.

== Gazi Husrev-bey's Hammam ==
The institute is situated in the centre of Sarajevo, at Mula Mustafe Bašeskije 21, adjacent to Gazi Husrev-begov hamam (Gazi Husrev-bey's Hammam), a public bath (hammam) built in 1535. Architects Hasan Ćemalović and Ahmet Kapidžić were awarded the Sixth of April Sarajevo Award in 2001 for the building, library, and a successful restoration of the Gazi Husrev-bey's Hammam. Two endowments (waqfs) are materialised in the Hammam building, first, Gazi Husrev-bey's, established when Islamic culture, education and scholarship were at their outset in Bosnia and Herzegovina, and the Bosniak Institute.

== Library ==
The library of the Bosniak Institute has over 250,000 items (books, journals, maps, articles and other materials) ranging from the 14th century to contemporary scholarly and trade-specific resources of the 21st century. The library includes the following sections: Bosnica, Croatica, Serbica, Turcica, Islamica, Yugoslavica, manuscripts, reference works, as well as the collections such as Judaica, Bogomils, Sanjak, Emigrantica, and the 1992-1995 war section.

== Art collection ==
The art collection of the Bosniak Institute evolved during several decades, originally as the private collection of Adil Zulfikarpašić and his wife Tatjana, and subsequently as the collection of the Bosniak Institute.

The collection includes more than 1500 artworks (paintings, engravings, and sculptures) by many Bosnian authors, from Ismet Mujezinović, Hakija Kulenović, Rizah Štetić, Ibrahim Ljubović, Vojo Dimitrijević, Mersad Berber, Affan Ramić, Mevludin Ekmečić, to Safet Zec, Salim Obralić, Mehmed Zaimović, and others. The donated private collections of Mersad Berber, Mevludin Ekmečić, Ismet Rizvić, Edo Numankadić and others are particularly significant.

== Archive ==
The archive includes more than 8000 items ranging from the 15th century to the modern age.

== Mission ==
The mission of the Bosniak Institute is to promote cultural heritage, historical truth and culture of Bosniaks and other peoples in Bosnia and Herzegovina. As part of its programs and activities, the institute develops and fosters scholarly cooperation with similar institutions in the country and abroad, collects, examines and preserves cultural and historical heritage and contemporary scholarly and trade-specific production of Bosnia and Herzegovina, organises scholarly, scientific, expert and international events, and develops its publishing production.

== Management ==
The Bosniak institute is managed by the steering committee and the managing director. The chair of the steering committee is Fehim Škaljić, deputy chair is Mirsad Kurtović, and the secretary is Erdal Trhulj. The director of the Bosniak Institute is Professor Faris Gavrankapetanović, Ph.D. Other members of the steering committee are: Professor Zlatko Lagumdžija, Ph.D., Mirsada Hukić, Ph.D., Hilmo Neimarlija, Ph.D., Safet Bandžović, Ph.D., Jasmina Bešlagić, Zijo Krvavac, and Taner Aličehić.
