= Mehmed Kapetanović =

Bosnian writer and public official (1839–1902)

Bey Mehmed Kapetanović
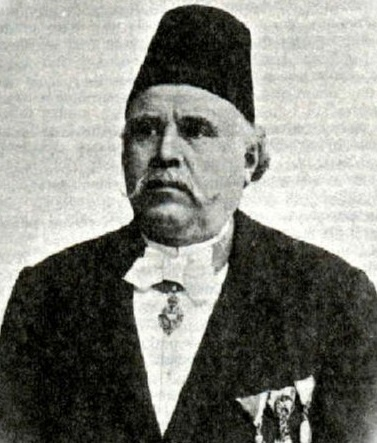

2nd Mayor of Sarajevo
- In office 1893 – April 1899
- Preceded by: Mustafa Fadilpašić
- Succeeded by: Nezir Škaljić

Personal details
- Born: Mehmed Kapetanović; 19 December 1839 Vitina, Bosnia Eyalet, Ottoman Empire
- Died: 29 July 1902 (aged 62) Grbavica, Condominium of Bosnia and Herzegovina, Austria-Hungary

Mehmed Bey Kapetanović Ljubušak (19 December 1839 – 29 July 1902) was a Bosnian writer and public official who served as the second mayor of Sarajevo from 1893 to 1899.

== Biography ==
The Kapetanović family was a bey family from Ljubuški, with the oldest known descendant being Abdulah Agha Kapetanović (1588 – 1630). Mehmed's father was Suleyman Bey Kapetanović, who was among the beys that sided with Ali Pasha Rizvanbegović in the support of the Sultan against Husein Gradaščević in the Bosnian uprising. In early 1832, during the battle for Utvica near Vitina, he was defeated by Gradaščević's army and fled to neighbouring Dalmatia. After Gradašćević was defeated and the captaincy system was abolished in 1835, Sulejman returned as mutasallim, a civil governor, and kaymakam, a military commander, of the nahiye of Ljubuški.

Kapetanović's mother came from the notable Atlagić noble family of Livno, which produced several pashas and military commanders. From a young age, he studied Turkish, Arabic, and Persian, initially at a mekteb-i rüşdiye in Mostar, later deepening his knowledge under the scholar Mehmed ef. Krehić in Ljubuški.

At the age of 20, he became a member of the Medžlisi idare (administrative council) in his hometown. Shortly after, he was sent by his father to Grahovac to serve in the Ottoman army under Çerkes Husein Pasha. During the Herzegovinian uprisings, he led local citizens and served for several months on the Montenegrin border under Derviš Pasha Lovčali. For his service, he was awarded a gold- and silver-adorned sword and a medal for bravery by the Sultan.

Kapetanović attended the madrasa in Ljubuški and studied oriental languages. Kapetanović arrived in Sarajevo in 1878, where he became the mayor in 1893, holding the office until declining health forced him to resign in 1899. He died in Sarajevo in 1902.

During the late 19th century, Kapetanović actively collected Bosniak folk treasures in Bosnia and Herzegovina and neighbouring regions. He published several books, the most famous being Narodno blago (English: "The National Wealth") from 1887. In 1891, Kapetanović founded the influential political journal Bošnjak ("Bosniak"), which brought together several Bosniak intellectuals of the time.

Kapetanović became the mayor of Sarajevo in 1893, following the death of the first mayor Mustafa Fadilpašić in 1892. The most significant project during Kapetanović's governance was the delivery of electricity to the city. Specifically, on 1 May 1895, Sarajevo had its first electric lighting. Until then, the street lights were oil lanterns. On that same day, Sarajevo became one of the first European cities to install electric tram-trains, replacing horse-drawn vehicles.

Kapetanović survived a stroke in July 1898. His health rapidly declined; by April 1899, he had stepped down as mayor. He died on 29 July 1902 at the age of 62. His son Riza-beg Kapetanović died 24 December 1931.

== Main works ==
- Risale-i ahlak (Treatise on Morals, 1883)
- Sto misle muhamedanci u Bosni? (What Do Mohammedans in Bosnia Think?, 1886)
- Narodno Blago (The National Wealth, 1887)
- Boj pod Banjomlukom 1737 (The Banja Luka Battle, 1737, 1888)
- Budućnost ili napredak muhamedanaca u Bosni i Hercegovini (Future or Progress of the Mohammedans in Bosnia and Herzegovina, 1893)

== Notes ==
Political offices
Preceded by Mustafa Fadilpašić	Mayor of Sarajevo; 1893–1899	Succeeded by Nezir Škaljić
