= Humuani Alaga =

Nigerian activist

Personal details
- Born: Ibadan
- Died: 29 January 1993 Ibadan
- Parent: Alfa Aliu Adisa Alaga
- Occupation: Activist; Entrepreneur
- Profession: Activist
- Nickname: Muminaat

Humuani Amoke Alaga, popularly known as Mama Humuani Alaga (ca. 1900 – 1993) was a Nigerian activist and indigenous entrepreneur in the textile business. She was also referred to as a Muminaat who encouraged and influenced women to be active citizens. In 1938, she led protesters to demand equal pay and better working condition for women. In 1958, she founded the Isabatudeen Women's Society with 11 other women. In 1959, she co-founded the National Council of Women's Societies.

== Early life ==
Alaga was born around 1900 in Ibadan into the family of Alfa Aliu Adisa Alaga, a Muslim cleric and trader, and Asimowu Oladoyinbo Ladebo Anigbalawo, a textile and bead trader. With two older sisters and an older brother, she was the youngest in the family. She ventured into the sales of textiles and beads at a very young age through her parents. She married at the age of 18.

== Career ==
Alaga started her business by hawking textiles after her marriage in 1925. She later opened a shop between 1928 and 1929 and became a dealer for other companies. She became the leader of textile dealers in 1934 at Gbagi market. She co-founded the Egbe Ifelodun in 1930. She founded the Isabatudeen society in 1958. In 1958, after being refused entry for her daughter into a Christian school, she founded, with eleven other women, a society which took the name of Isabatudeen Society (IS). At the heart of its program was a project to create a secondary school for girls. She founded Isabatudeen Girls' Grammar School.

== Activism ==
The Women Cotton Trade Union protested in 1938 against the Lebanese traders who were acting as middlemen in the textile business and were making huge profits. The protest was led by Alaga as she was against the Lebanese traders operating at some places in Ibadan that was meant for the local traders. This later led to the creation of the National Council of Women's Societies (NCWS) in 1959. In 1953, she led the Ibadan African Textile Association to protest against the relocation of Dugbe market. The protesters went bare-footed and bare-headed to the king's palace and demanded that the location of the market remained unchanged. She also led market women to the Governor's place to protest against the killing of protesters by soldiers in 1978.

She also advocated for equal pay for all during a visit to the State Governor.

== Death ==
Alaga died on 29 January 1993 in Ibadan.
