= Muslim Independent Party (Bosnia and Herzegovina) =

Muslim Independent Party (Muslimanska samostalna stranka; MSS), priorly known as the Muslim Progressive Party (Muslimanska napredna stranka; MNS) was a Bosnian Muslim political party during Austro-Hungarian rule in Bosnia and Herzegovina. It was established in 1908 by Ademaga Mešić. Prior to 1910, it advocated Croatian nationalism among Bosnian Muslims, and later adopted an Islamic platform.

== History ==
The Muslim Progressive Party (MNS) advocated Croatian nationalism amongst the Bosnian Muslims and at the same time opposed the Serbian aspirations towards Bosnia and Herzegovina. The members of the MMS opposed the Islamic conservatism of the dominant Muslim National Organization (MNO), which represented the interests of the Bosnian Muslim land-owning elite and opposed modernisation efforts. The MMS party criticised conservatism and the "backwardness" of the leadership of the cultural and educational autonomy of the Bosnian Muslims. They were loyal to the Austro-Hungarian authorities. The party's programme did not include any points on the croatisation of Bosnian Muslims. However, because of the activity of its magazine Muslimanska svijest (the Muslim consciousness), especially its main editor Ekrem Šahinović and the partly leader Mešić, the broader public saw it as a Croatian nationalist. The MNS generated low support among the Bosnian Muslims, among others, due to its pro-Croatian and pro-regime stance.

In an aim to become more popular, at an assembly held in Sarajevo on 31 January 1910, the MNS changed its programme by abandoning nationalism and adopting an Islamic platform. The party also changed its name to the Muslim Independent Party (MSS). It was also decided that Muslimanska svijest will be replaced by Muslimanska sloga (the Muslim unity). The assembly was held mainly upon the request of Esad Kulović, the mayor of Sarajevo, who, since the annexation of Bosnia and Herzegovina by Austria-Hungary in 1908, to the time of the first constitution in 1910, made himself a factual leader of the party, even though he was not the member of its main committee. As a condition for his entering the party leadership, Kulovič insisted that the party abandon nationalism, which was mainly opposed by Mešić.

Before the 1910 election for the Diet of Bosnia, the MSS and the MNO tried to form a joint list. The MNO offered the MSS six seats of the Muslim quota; however, the MSS requested more. The negotiations broke down, and MNO won all 24 Muslim seats in the Diet of Bosnia. Kulović, who, as the mayor of Sarajevo, was to be a member of the Diet by right, resigned.

== Bibliography ==
=== News articles ===
- "Prošlo je 113 godina od prvih izbora: Meta je ista, a ni odstojanja nisu mnogo drukčija" [It has been 113 years since the first election: the target is the same, and differences are not much different]. Stav (in Bosnian). Sarajevo. 28 May 2023.

=== Web sites ===
- Ćeman, Mithad (2022). "Politički život muslimana u austrougarskoj Bosni i Hercegovini" [Political life of Muslims in Austrian-Hungarian Bosnia and Herzegovina]. El-Asr (in Bosnian). Sarajevo.
