= Atlagić =

Atlagić is a surname. Notable people with the name include:

- Carlos Atlagic (1915–1987), Chilean footballer
- Juan Carlos Villalta Atlagic (born 1944), Chilean sports journalist
- Jolle Atlagic, Swedish drummer of the band Electric Boys
- Marko Atlagić (born 1949), Croatian-born Serbian historian and politician
- Mehmed Pasha Atlagić, 17th-century Ottoman governor of Bosnia
- Zulfikar-pasha Atlagić, 17th-century Ottoman governor of the Sanjak of Klis

== See also ==
- Kula Atlagića, a village in Zadar County, Croatia named after a person named Atlagić
