= Mula Mustafa Bašeskija =

- Born: c. 1731; Sarajevo, Bosnia Eyalet, Ottoman Empire
- Died: 18 August 1809 (aged c. 78); Sarajevo, Bosnia Eyalet, Ottoman Empire
- Occupations: Chronicler, diarist, writer, poet
- Spouse: Safija
- Children: 10
- Writing career
- Pen name: Ševki
- Language: Bosnian, Ottoman Turkish

Mula Mustafa Bašeskija (c. 1731 – 18 August 1809) was a Bosnian chronicler, diarist, poet and calligrapher in the Ottoman Empire. He chronicled the history and events in Sarajevo, Bosnia, Herzegovina and in the Ottoman Empire during his lifetime and is considered an important figure in the history of Sarajevo for preserving information that would have otherwise been forgotten.

== Early life and background ==
Bašeskija was born into a poor Muslim family in a Sarajevo quarter named after Mimar Sinan. Both his paternal grandfather Kadir and maternal grandfather Mehmed were Imams. Bašeskija lost his father Ahmed when he was a child. His mother Fatima remarried and died in 1772 of a stroke after a long illness. His uncle Topal Osman-aga died in Belgrade in 1760.

As a child Bašeskija attended maktab and later madrasa. It wasn't until 1763 that he began scribing Bosnian history. During the 1760s he also owned a small shop underneath a clock tower in Sarajevo.

In his shop, in addition to clerical jobs, he taught students and other people in the Arabic calligraphy and Sharia law. In 1779, he wrote that he and few friends met once a week in a house, where, in addition to gathering and conversing for half an hour, were dedicated to reading books.

Bašeskija left Sarajevo on 1 July 1781 and moved with his family to the village Zgošća near Kakanj, only to return to Sarajevo less than a year later in February 1782.

Bosnia and Herzegovina, along with most of Europe, experienced a resurgence of the Black Death plague in the 18th century. Bašeskija chronicled the lives of 4,000 of the dead, mostly adult Bosniaks.

== Works ==
Mula Mustafa Bašeskija added a collection of poems in the Bosnian language in one of his yearbooks, arguing that the Bosnian language is much richer than Arabic, because there are 45 words for the verb "to go" in Bosnian.

Probably his best-known work is Ljetopis o Sarajevu ("Chronicle of Sarajevo"), in which he detailed not only his life and the lives of his family members, but the urban life in Sarajevo in its various aspects and events in Sarajevo and the Bosnian province as a whole from 1746 to 1804.

== Later life and death ==
Bašeskija became ill in 1801 and died in the summer of 1809 aged about 77–78.
