= Cabinet of Andrej Plenković III =

16th government of Croatia

Third Plenković cabinet
- 16th Cabinet of the Republic of Croatia
- 2024–present
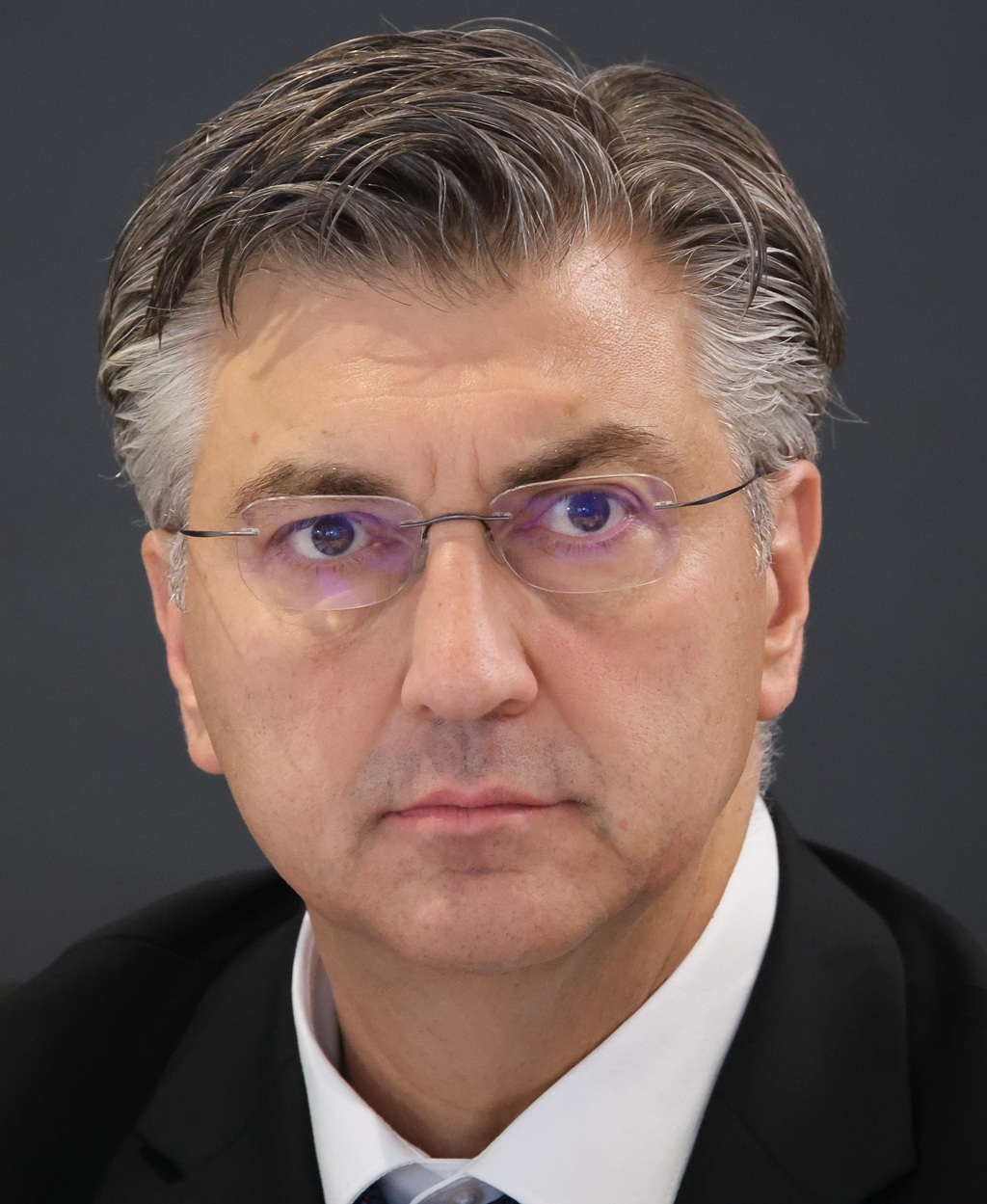
- Date formed: 17 May 2024

People and organisations
- Head of state: Zoran Milanović
- Head of government: Andrej Plenković
- Deputy head of government: Davor Božinović; Tomo Medved; Oleg Butković; Branko Bačić; Ivan Anušić; Josip Dabro (2024–2025); Marko Primorac (2024–2026); David Vlajčić (2025–); Tomislav Ćorić (2026–)
- No. of ministers: 18
- Member parties: Croatian Democratic Union; Homeland Movement with support from HSLS, HNS, HDS, HSU, Bošnjaci zajedno!, DZMH, Kali Sara and Independents
- Status in legislature: Minority coalition government
- Opposition party: Social Democratic Party (2024–present)
- Opposition leader: Peđa Grbin (2024); Siniša Hajdaš Dončić (2024–present)

History
- Election: 2024 election
- Legislature terms: 2024–
- Predecessor: Cabinet of Andrej Plenković II

The Sixteenth Government of the Republic of Croatia (Croatian: Šesnaesta Vlada Republike Hrvatske) is the current Croatian Government cabinet formed on 17 May 2024, following the 2024 election. It is led by Prime Minister Andrej Plenković.

== Motions of confidence ==
Vote on the confirmation of the 16th Government of the Republic of Croatia
Ballot	17 May 2024	
Absentees	10 / 151	
Required majority	76 Yes votes out of 151 votes (Absolute majority of the total number of Members of Parliament)	
Yes	79 / 151	check
No	61 / 151	
Abstentions	1 / 151	

Vote of no confidence in Prime Minister Andrej Plenković
Ballot	6 December 2024	
Absentees	11 / 151	
Required majority	76 Yes votes of 151 votes (Absolute majority of the total number of Members of Parliament)	
Yes	64 / 151	
No	76 / 151	X mark
Abstentions	0 / 151	

Vote of no confidence in Prime Minister Andrej Plenković
Ballot	21 October 2026	
Absentees	15 / 151	
Required majority	76 Yes votes of 151 votes (Absolute majority of the total number of Members of Parliament)	
Yes	55 / 151	
No	79 / 151	X mark
Abstentions	2 / 151	

== Party breakdown ==
Party breakdown of cabinet ministers:

- Croatian Democratic Union
- Homeland Movement
16
3

== Current cabinet ==
Portfolio	Minister	Took office	Party
Prime Minister's Office
Prime Minister	Andrej Plenković	17 May 2024	HDZ
Deputy Prime Ministers
Agriculture, Forestry and Fisheries	David Vlajčić	11 February 2025	DP
Construction, Physical Planning and State Property	Branko Bačić	17 May 2024	HDZ
Croatian Veterans	Tomo Medved	17 May 2024	HDZ
Defence	Ivan Anušić	17 May 2024	HDZ
Finance	Tomislav Ćorić	29 January 2026	HDZ
Interior	Davor Božinović	17 May 2024	HDZ
Maritime Affairs, Transport and Infrastructure	Oleg Butković	17 May 2024	HDZ
Ministers
Culture and Media	Nina Obuljen Koržinek	17 May 2024	HDZ
Demographics and Immigration	Ivan Šipić	17 May 2024	DP
Economy	Ante Šušnjar	17 May 2024	DP
Environmental Protection and Green Transition	Marija Vučković	17 May 2024	HDZ
Foreign and European Affairs	Gordan Grlić-Radman	17 May 2024	HDZ
Health	Irena Hrstić	6 December 2024	HDZ
Justice, Public Administration and Digital Transformation	Damir Habijan	17 May 2024	HDZ
Labour, Pension System, Family and Social Policy	Alen Ružić	20 February 2026	HDZ
Regional Development and EU funds	Nataša Mikuš Žigman	15 July 2025	HDZ
Science, Education and Youth	Radovan Fuchs	17 May 2024	HDZ
Tourism and Sports	Tonči Glavina	17 May 2024	HDZ

== Former members ==
Minister	Party	Portfolio	Period	Days in office	Source
Vili Beroš	HDZ	Health	17 May 2024 – 15 November 2024	182
Josip Dabro	DP	Agriculture, Forestry and Fisheries	17 May 2024 – 18 January 2025	246
Šime Erlić	HDZ	Regional Development and EU funds	17 May 2024 – 15 July 2025	424
Marko Primorac	Ind.	Finance	17 May 2024 – 29 January 2026	622
Marin Piletić	HDZ	Labour, Pension System, Family and Social Policy	17 May 2024 – 20 February 2026	644
