= Cabinet of Andrej Plenković II =

Croatian government (2020–2024)

Second Plenković cabinet
- 15th Cabinet of the Republic of Croatia
- 2020–2024
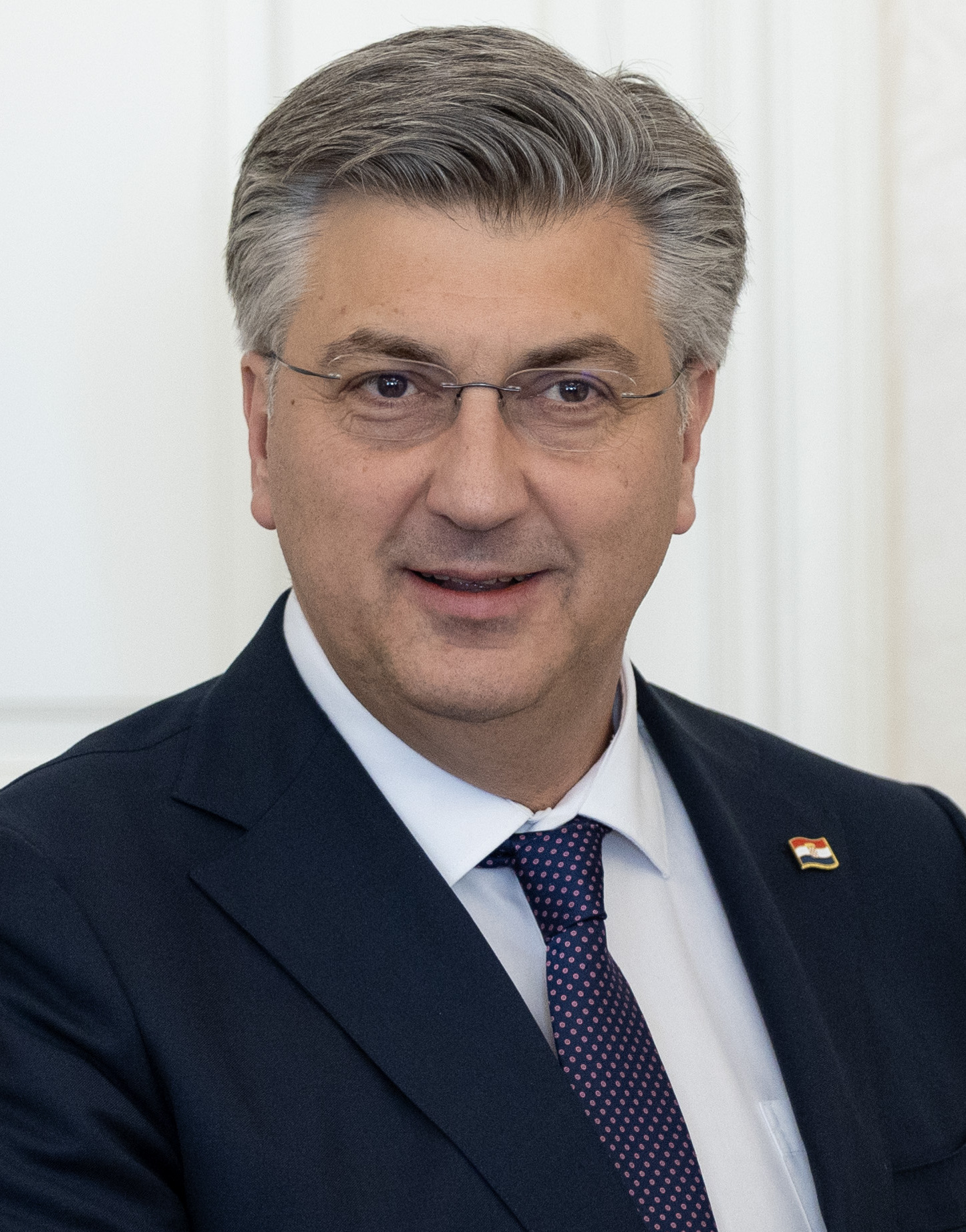
- Date formed: 23 July 2020
- Date dissolved: 17 May 2024

People and organisations
- Head of state: Zoran Milanović
- Head of government: Andrej Plenković
- Deputy head of government: Zdravko Marić (2020–2022); Davor Božinović; Tomo Medved; Boris Milošević (2020–2022); Anja Šimpraga (2022–2024); Oleg Butković (2022–2024); Branko Bačić (2023–2024); Ivan Anušić (2023–2024)
- No. of ministers: 17
- Ministers removed: 7
- Total no. of members: 25
- Member parties: Croatian Democratic Union; Independent Democratic Serb Party with support from HSLS, HDS, HDSSB, HNS, NS-R, DZMH, Kali Sara, Union of Albanians, Independents (since 2020) and HSU (since 2021)
- Status in legislature: Minority coalition government
- Opposition party: Social Democratic Party, Social Democrats (2022–2024), DPMŠ, The Bridge, We can!, among others
- Opposition leader: Zlatko Komadina (2020, acting); Peđa Grbin (2020–2022); Davorko Vidović (2022–2024)

History
- Election: 2020 election
- Legislature terms: 2020–2024
- Predecessor: Cabinet of Andrej Plenković I
- Successor: Cabinet of Andrej Plenković III

The Fifteenth Government of the Republic of Croatia (Croatian: Petnaesta Vlada Republike Hrvatske) was the Croatian Government cabinet formed on 23 July 2020, following the 2020 election. It was led by Prime Minister Andrej Plenković. The cabinet was dissolved on 17 May 2024 and was succeeded by a new government presided over by Plenković for the third consecutive time.

== Motions of confidence ==
Vote on the confirmation of the 15th Government of the Republic of Croatia
Ballot	23 July 2020	
Absentees	16 / 151	
Required majority	76 Yes votes out of 151 votes (Absolute majority of the total number of Members of Parliament)	
Yes	76 / 151	check
No	59 / 151	
Abstentions	0 / 151	

Vote of no confidence in Prime Minister Andrej Plenković
Ballot	3 March 2023	
Absentees	17 / 151	
Required majority	76 Yes votes of 151 votes (Absolute majority of the total number of Members of Parliament)	
Yes	56 / 151	
No	77 / 151	X mark
Abstentions	1 / 151	

== Party breakdown ==
Party breakdown of cabinet ministers:

- Croatian Democratic Union
16
- Independent Democratic Serb Party
1
- Independent
1

== List of ministers ==
Portfolio	Minister	Took office	Party
Prime Minister's Office
Prime Minister	Andrej Plenković	23 July 2020	HDZ
Deputy Prime Ministers
Croatian Veterans	Tomo Medved	23 July 2020	HDZ
Interior	Davor Božinović	23 July 2020	HDZ
Maritime Affairs, Transport and Infrastructure	Oleg Butković	23 July 2020	HDZ
Minister without portfolio responsibility for Social Affairs and Human and Minority Rights	Anja Šimpraga	29 April 2022	SDSS
Construction, Physical Planning and State Property	Branko Bačić	17 January 2023	HDZ
Ministers
Agriculture	Marija Vučković	23 July 2020	HDZ
Culture and Media	Nina Obuljen Koržinek	23 July 2020	HDZ
Defence	Ivan Anušić	16 November 2023	HDZ
Economy and Sustainable Development	Damir Habijan	20 December 2023	HDZ
Finance	Marko Primorac	15 July 2022	Ind.^{(HDZ)}
Foreign and European Affairs	Gordan Grlić-Radman	23 July 2020	HDZ
Health	Vili Beroš	23 July 2020	HDZ
Justice and Public Administration	Ivan Malenica	24 July 2020	HDZ
Labour, Pension System, Family and Social Policy	Marin Piletić	29 April 2022	HDZ
Regional Development and EU funds	Šime Erlić	17 January 2023	HDZ
Science and Education	Radovan Fuchs	23 July 2020	HDZ
Tourism and Sports	Nikolina Brnjac	23 July 2020	HDZ

== Status in the Sabor ==
The cabinet is a two-party minority government composed of the Croatian Democratic Union (HDZ) and the Independent Democratic Serb Party (SDSS). Together these parties have a delegation made up of 64 Members of Parliament (out of 151 in total) and are thus short of an overall majority of 76 MPs by 12 seats. The government thus relies on outside parliamentary support from other parties and individual MPs to achieve such a majority. This support is provided by the HDZ's pre-electoral coalition partners - HSLS, HDS, HDSSB and independent MP Marijana Petir, as well as by MPs from several smaller parties - HNS-LD, NS-R, the Democratic Union of Hungarians, Kali Sara and the Union of Albanians, and finally by two independents representing national minorities - Furio Radin and Vladimir Bilek. In June 2021 the government's majority was increased to from 76 to 77 seats, when prime minister Plenković reached a mutual cooperation agreement with Silvano Hrelja's HSU.

Parliamentary seats held by parties in the cabinet (23 July 2020):

↓
61	3	87
HDZ	SDSS	Non-cabinet parties and independent lists

Parliamentary seats held by parties supporting the government (23 July 2020):

↓
64	5	5	1	1	75
HDZ; SDSS	HSLS; HDS; HDSSB; 1 Ind.	DZMH; KS; UARH; 2 Ind.	HNS	R	Opposition

== Former members ==
Minister	Party	Portfolio	Period	Days in office	Source
Darko Horvat	HDZ	Construction, Physical Planning and State Property	23 July 2020 – 19 February 2022	576
Tomislav Ćorić	HDZ	Economy and Sustainable Development	23 July 2020 – 29 April 2022	645
Josip Aladrović	HDZ	Labour, Pension System, Family and Social Policy	23 July 2020 – 29 April 2022	645
Boris Milošević	SDSS	Minister without portfolio responsibility for Social Affairs and Human and Minority Rights	23 July 2020 – 29 April 2022	645
Zdravko Marić	Ind.^{(HDZ)}	Finance	23 July 2020 – 15 July 2022	722
Ivan Paladina	Ind.^{(HDZ)}	Construction, Physical Planning and State Property	19 February 2022 – 17 January 2023	332
Nataša Tramišak	HDZ	Regional Development and EU funds	23 July 2020 – 17 January 2023	908
Mario Banožić	HDZ	Defence	23 July 2020 – 11 November 2023	1206
Davor Filipović	HDZ	Economy and Sustainable Development	29 April 2022 – 12 December 2023	593
