= Ministry of Defence (Croatia) =

Ministry of the Croatian government

Ministry of Defence Ministarstvo obrane
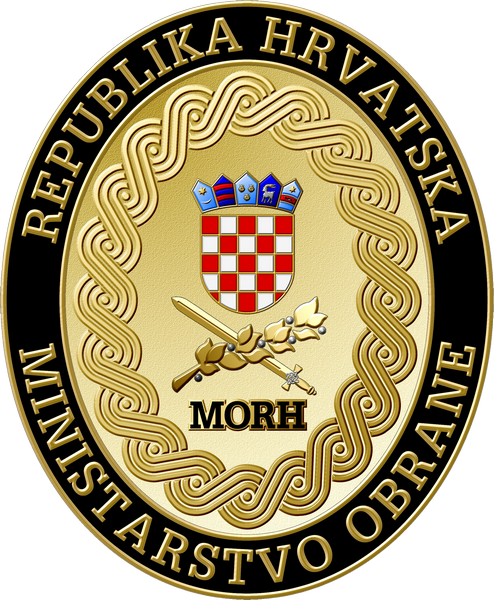
- Official seal

- MORH Headquarters building

Ministry overview
- Formed: 31 May 1990; 36 years ago
- Type: Ministry in the Government of Croatia
- Jurisdiction: Croatia
- Headquarters: Trg kralja Petra Krešimira IV 1, Zagreb, Croatia
- Employees: 995 (2025)
- Budget: €1.626 billion (2026 budget)
- Website: morh.hr

Minister
- Currently: Ivan Anušić since 16 November 2023

The Ministry of Defence of the Republic of Croatia (Croatian: Ministarstvo obrane Republike Hrvatske or MORH) is the ministry in the Government of Croatia which is in charge of the nation's military. It is Croatia's ministry of defence. The ministry was established in 1990.

== Organization ==
The Ministry has a total of 995 staff (as of 2025), working in the following departments:

Department	Croatian language	Staff
Cabinet of the Minister	Kabinet Ministra	46
General Secretariat	Glavno tajništvo	60
Defense Policy Directorate	Uprava za obrambenu politiku	92
Human Resources Department	Uprava za ljudske potencijale	286
Armaments Directorate	Uprava za naoružanje	108
Budget and Finance Directorate	Uprava za proračun i financije	124
Directorate for Infrastructure and Support	Uprava za infrastrukturu i potporu	122
Defense Inspectorate	Inspektorat obrane	36
Independent Public Procurement Sector	Samostalni sektor za javnu nabavu	34
Independent Sector for Military Police Affairs	Samostalni sektor za vojnopolicijske poslove	27
Military Disciplinary Court	Vojnostegovni sud	9
Independent Service for Military Air and Sea Transport	Samostalna služba za vojni zračni i pomorski promet	17
Independent Public Relations and Military Media Service	Samostalna služba za odnose s javnošću i vojna glasila	20
Independent Internal Audit Service	Samostalna služba za unutarnju reviziju	7
Independent Department for Support to the Military Ordinariate of Croatia	Samostalni odjel za potporu vojnom ordinarijatu u Republici Hrvatskoj	7

== List of ministers ==
Political parties:

Croatian Democratic Union (13)
Social Democratic Party (2)
Croatian Social Liberal Party (1)

No.	Portrait	Minister of Defence	Took office	Left office	Time in office	Party	Cabinet
1	Petar Kriste [hr]	Petar Kriste (born 1936)	30 May 1990	24 August 1990	86 days	HDZ	Mesić
2	Martin Špegelj	Martin Špegelj (1927–2014)	24 August 1990	2 July 1991	312 days	HDZ	Manolić
3	Šime Đodan	Šime Đodan (1927–2007)	2 July 1991	17 July 1991	15 days	HDZ	Manolić
4	Luka Bebić	Luka Bebić (born 1937)	17 July 1991	18 September 1991	63 days	HDZ	Gregurić
5	Gojko Šušak	Gojko Šušak (1945–1998)	18 September 1991	3 May 1998 †	6 years, 227 days	HDZ	Gregurić; Šarinić; Valentić; Mateša
6	Andrija Hebrang	Andrija Hebrang (born 1946)	14 May 1998	12 October 1998	162 days	HDZ	Mateša
7	Pavao Miljavac	Pavao Miljavac (1953–2022)	14 October 1998	27 January 2000	1 year, 107 days	HDZ	Mateša
8	Jozo Radoš	Jozo Radoš (born 1956)	28 January 2000	5 July 2002	2 years, 158 days	HSLS	Račan I
9	Željka Antunović*	Željka Antunović* (born 1955)	30 July 2002	23 December 2003	1 year, 146 days	SDP	Račan II
10	Berislav Rončević	Berislav Rončević (born 1960)	23 December 2003	12 January 2008	4 years, 20 days	HDZ	Sanader I
11	Branko Vukelić	Branko Vukelić (1958–2013)	12 January 2008	29 December 2010	2 years, 351 days	HDZ	Sanader II; Kosor
12	Davor Božinović	Davor Božinović (born 1961)	29 December 2010	23 December 2011	359 days	HDZ	Kosor
13	Ante Kotromanović	Ante Kotromanović (born 1968)	23 December 2011	22 January 2016	4 years, 30 days	SDP	Milanović
14	Josip Buljević [hr]	Josip Buljević (born 1971)	22 January 2016	19 October 2016	271 days	HDZ	Orešković
15	Damir Krstičević*	Damir Krstičević* (born 1969)	19 October 2016	8 May 2020	3 years, 202 days	HDZ	Plenković I
16	Mario Banožić	Mario Banožić (born 1979)	23 July 2020	11 November 2023	3 years, 111 days	HDZ	Plenković II
-	Zdravko Jakop (acting)	Zdravko Jakop (acting) (born 1967)	11 November 2023	16 November 2023	5 days	Independent	Plenković II
17	Ivan Anušić *	Ivan Anušić * (born 1973)	16 November 2023	Incumbent	2 years, 353 days	HDZ	Plenković II; Plenković III

(*) Ministers of Defence who held the post of Deputy Prime Minister of Croatia while in office.

(**) Incumbent's time in office last updated: 4 November 2026.

== See also ==
- Armed Forces of Croatia
