= Cabinet of Andrej Plenković I =

Croatian government (2016–2020)

First Plenković cabinet
- 14th Cabinet of the Republic of Croatia
- 2016–2020
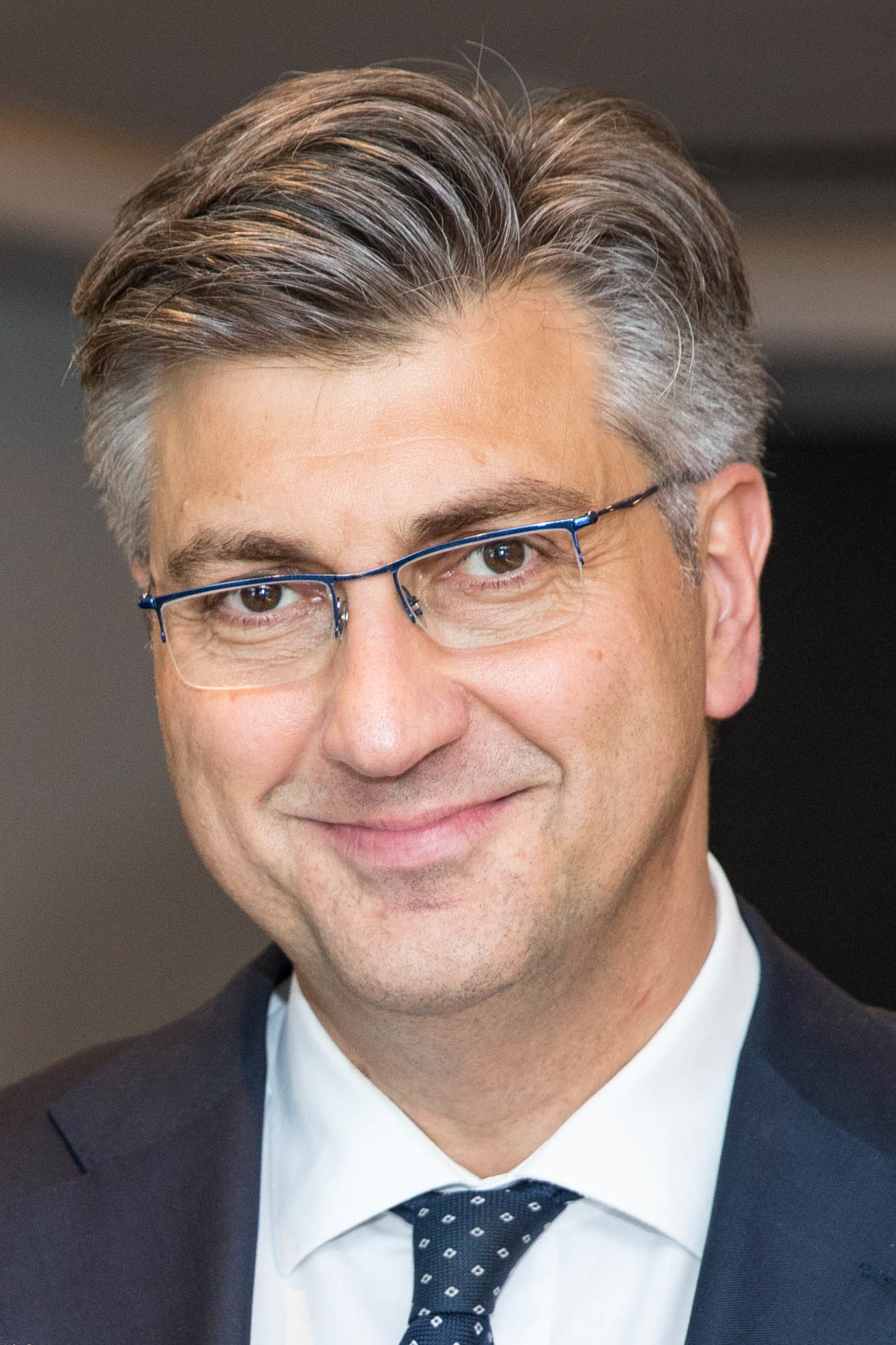
- Date formed: 19 October 2016
- Date dissolved: 23 July 2020

People and organisations
- Head of state: Kolinda Grabar-Kitarović (2016–2020); Zoran Milanović (2020)
- Head of government: Andrej Plenković
- Deputy head of government: Ivan Kovačić (2016–2017); Davor Ivo Stier (2016–2017); Martina Dalić (2016–2018); Damir Krstičević (2016–2020); Predrag Štromar (2017–2020); Marija Pejčinović Burić (2017–2019); Tomislav Tolušić (2018–2019); Zdravko Marić (2019–2020); Davor Božinović (2019–2020)
- No. of ministers: 20
- Ministers removed: 16
- Total no. of members: 34 (including former members)
- Member parties: Croatian Democratic Union; Croatian People's Party (since June 2017) with support from SDSS, HDS, HSLS, HDSSB, BM 365 and NS-R Former parties: Bridge of Independent Lists (junior coalition partner until April 2017); Hrast (providing parliamentary support until April 2018)
- Status in legislature: Minority coalition government
- Opposition party: Social Democratic Party
- Opposition leader: Zoran Milanović (2016); Davor Bernardić (2016–2020); Zlatko Komadina (Acting; 2020)

History
- Election: 2016 election
- Legislature terms: 2016–2020
- Predecessor: Cabinet of Tihomir Orešković
- Successor: Cabinet of Andrej Plenković II

The Fourteenth Government of the Republic of Croatia (Croatian: Četrnaesta Vlada Republike Hrvatske) was the Croatian Government cabinet formed on 19 October 2016, following the 2016 election. It was led by Prime Minister Andrej Plenković. The cabinet was dissolved on 23 July 2020 and was succeeded by a new government presided over by Plenković.

== Overview ==
When naming the members of his own cabinet Plenković chose to retain eight ministers from the then outgoing Orešković cabinet:

- Zdravko Marić remained Minister of Finance
- Vlaho Orepić remained Minister of the Interior (until 27 April 2017)
- Ante Šprlje remained Minister of Justice (until 27 April 2017)
- Tomislav Tolušić became Minister of Agriculture after serving as Minister of Regional Development and EU Funds under Orešković
- Lovro Kuščević remained Minister of Construction and Spatial Planning (until 9 June 2017)
- Slaven Dobrović remained Minister of Environment, while getting the addition of Energy to his ministerial portfolio (until 27 April 2017)
- Oleg Butković remained Minister of Maritime Affairs, Transport and Infrastructure
- Tomo Medved remained Minister of Croatian Veterans, which was renamed from the Ministry of Veterans' Affairs in the previous cabinet

Following the reshuffle of 9 June 2017, two ministers from the previous make-up were given new portfolios:

- Lovro Kuščević, previously serving as Minister of Construction and Spatial Planning became Minister of Public Administration
- Tomislav Ćorić, previously serving as Minister of Labour and Pension System became Minister of Environmental Protection and Energy.

According to a regular monthly survey of political preferences conducted by Ipsos agency in November 2017, 74% of respondents thought Croatia was moving in a wrong direction, while 20% thought opposite. The level of pessimism was highest since the approval of Plenković's cabinet a year earlier. According to the same survey, Government's policies were not supported by 62% of respondents, opposite to 29% who thought differently.

== Motions of confidence ==
Vote on the confirmation of the 14th Government of the Republic of Croatia
Ballot	19 October 2016	
Absentees	12 / 151	
Required majority	76 Yes votes out of 151 votes (Absolute majority of the total number of Members of Parliament)	
Yes	91 / 151	check
No	45 / 151	
Abstentions	3 / 151	

Vote of no confidence in Prime Minister Andrej Plenković
Ballot	11 November 2017	
Absentees	14 / 151	
Required majority	76 Yes votes, Abstentions or Absentees out of 151 votes (Absolute majority of the total number of Members of Parliament)	
Yes	59 / 151	
No	78 / 151	☒
Abstentions	0 / 151	

== Party breakdown ==
Party breakdown of cabinet ministers:

- Croatian Democratic Union
18
- Independent
2
- Croatian People's Party
1

== List of ministers ==
Portfolio	Minister	Took office	Left office	Party
Prime Minister's Office
Prime Minister	Andrej Plenković	19 October 2016	23 July 2020	HDZ
Deputy Prime Ministers
Minister of the Interior	Davor Božinović	9 June 2017	23 July 2020	HDZ
Minister of Defence	Damir Krstičević	19 October 2016	23 July 2020	HDZ
Minister of Finance	Zdravko Marić	19 October 2016	23 July 2020	Ind.^{(HDZ)}
Minister of Construction and Spatial Planning	Predrag Štromar	9 June 2017	23 July 2020	HNS
Ministers
Minister of Agriculture	Marija Vučković	22 July 2019	23 July 2020	HDZ
Minister of Foreign and European Affairs	Gordan Grlić-Radman	22 July 2019	23 July 2020	HDZ
Minister of Public Administration	Ivan Malenica	22 July 2019	23 July 2020	HDZ
Minister of Justice	Dražen Bošnjaković	9 June 2017	23 July 2020	HDZ
Minister of Economy, Entrepreneurship and Crafts	Darko Horvat	25 May 2018	23 July 2020	HDZ
Minister of Regional Development and EU funds	Marko Pavić	22 July 2019	23 July 2020	HDZ
Minister of Environmental Protection and Energy	Tomislav Ćorić	9 June 2017	23 July 2020	HDZ
Minister of Maritime Affairs, Transport and Infrastructure	Oleg Butković	19 October 2016	23 July 2020	HDZ
Minister of Labour and Pension System	Josip Aladrović	22 July 2019	23 July 2020	HDZ
Minister of Health	Vili Beroš	31 January 2020	23 July 2020	HDZ
Minister of Demographics, Family, Youth and Social Policy	Vesna Bedeković	22 July 2019	23 July 2020	HDZ
Minister of Croatian Veterans	Tomo Medved	19 October 2016	23 July 2020	HDZ
Minister of Science and Education	Blaženka Divjak	9 June 2017	23 July 2020	Ind.^{(HNS)}
Minister of Culture	Nina Obuljen Koržinek	19 October 2016	23 July 2020	HDZ
Minister of Tourism	Gari Cappelli	19 October 2016	23 July 2020	HDZ
Minister of State Property	Mario Banožić	22 July 2019	23 July 2020	HDZ

== Former members ==
Minister	Party	Portfolio	Period	Days in office
Slaven Dobrović	Most	Minister of Environmental Protection and Energy	22 January 2016 – 27 April 2017	461
Vlaho Orepić	Most	Minister of the Interior	22 January 2016 – 27 April 2017	461
Ante Šprlje	Independent	Minister of Justice	22 January 2016 – 27 April 2017	461
Ivan Kovačić	Most	Minister of Public Administration; Deputy Prime Minister	19 October 2016 – 28 April 2017	191
Pavo Barišić	HDZ	Minister of Science and Education	19 October 2016 – 9 June 2017	233
Lovro Kuščević	HDZ	Minister of Construction and Spatial Planning; Minister of Public Administration	22 January 2016 – 9 June 2017; 9 June 2017 – 8 July 2019	504; 759
Tomislav Ćorić	HDZ	Minister of Labour and Pension System	19 October 2016 – 9 June 2017	233
Davor Ivo Stier	HDZ	Minister of Foreign and European Affairs; Deputy Prime Minister	19 October 2016 – 12 June 2017	236
Martina Dalić	HDZ	Minister of Economy, Entrepreneurship and Crafts	19 October 2016 – 14 May 2018	572
Goran Marić	HDZ	Minister of State Property	15 November 2016 – 15 July 2019	972
Nada Murganić	HDZ	Minister of Demographics, Family, Youth and Social Policy	19 October 2016 – 17 July 2019	1,001
Tomislav Tolušić	HDZ	Minister of Agriculture	19 October 2016 – 17 July 2019	1,001
Gabrijela Žalac	HDZ	Minister of Regional Development and EU Funds	19 October 2016 – 17 July 2019	1,001
Marko Pavić	HDZ	Minister of Labour and Pension System	9 June 2017 – 17 July 2019	768
Marija Pejčinović Burić	HDZ	Minister of Foreign and European Affairs	19 June 2017 – 17 July 2019	758
Milan Kujundžić	HDZ	Minister of Health	19 October 2016 – 28 January 2020	1,186
