= Ivan Kovačić =

Croatian politician (born 1974)

4th Minister of Public Administration of Croatia
- In office 19 October 2016 – 28 April 2017
- Preceded by: Dubravka Jurlina-Alibegović
- Succeeded by: Darko Nekić (acting)

Deputy Prime Minister of Croatia
- In office 19 October 2016 – 28 April 2017; Serving with Martina Dalić, Damir Krstičević and Davor Ivo Stier
- Prime Minister: Andrej Plenković
- Preceded by: Tomislav Karamarko; Božo Petrov
- Succeeded by: Predrag Štromar

Personal details
- Born: 25 April 1974 (age 52) Split, SR Croatia, SFR Yugoslavia
- Party: IP (2020–)
- Other political affiliations: Bridge of Independent Lists (until 2019)

Ivan Kovačić (born 25 April 1974) is a Croatian Politician. In May 2020, Kovačić became the president of the newly formed Party with a First and Last Name (IP). He is a former mayor of Omiš.

== See also ==
- Cabinet of Andrej Plenković
