= Petar Zinaić =

Petar Zinaić (died 2008 in Belgrade at the age of 90) was a Serb Partisan who was the first member of the force to be investigated for war crimes by the Republic of Croatia.

Zinaić originally fought with the Serb royalist Chetnik movement, before defecting to the Partisans. He later served in the OZNA intelligence services.

Zinaić left Croatia in 1995 when Operation Storm brought an end to the rebel Republic of Serbian Krajina. He then moved to Belgrade in the Federal Republic of Yugoslavia (today Serbia). He took with a large amount of archival material which he then gave to the National Archives of Serbia.

In April, 2007, he was reported by the Croatian Ministry of the Interior for responsibility in the deaths of over 140 people during World War II and its aftermath. The accusations were brought after the discovery of 360 bodies from the period on Babina gora and in the Bujadnjak forest. He died before charges could be filed against him.
