= Ministry of the Interior (Croatia) =

Ministry of the Croatian government

Ministry of the Interior Ministarstvo unutarnjih poslova
- Emblem of the Ministry of the Interior

Ministry overview
- Formed: 31 May 1990; 36 years ago
- Type: Ministry in the Government of Croatia
- Jurisdiction: Croatia
- Headquarters: Vukovarska 33, Zagreb, Croatia
- Employees: 24,942 (2025)
- Budget: €1.496 billion (2025 budget)
- Website: mup.gov.hr

Minister
- Currently: Davor Božinović since 9 June 2017

The Ministry of the Interior of the Republic of Croatia (Croatian: Ministarstvo unutarnjih poslova Republike Hrvatske or MUP RH) is the ministry in the Government of Croatia which is in charge of state security among other roles. Croatian Police is a public service of the Ministry of the Interior.

== Role ==
The Ministry of the Interior deals with administrative and other tasks related to the following:

- policing and criminal police activities that involve protection of life and personal security of people and property and the prevention and detection of crime;
- tracing and capturing of perpetrators of criminal offences and their bringing before the competent authorities;
- maintaining of public order and the protection of particular persons, citizens, facilities and premises;
- conducting of technical crime investigations and expert analysis;
- road traffic safety;
- state border protection;
- movement and stay of aliens and their admission;
- travel documents for crossing the state border;
- safeguarding at public gatherings;
- nationality affairs;
- issuing of identity cards and the registration of residence and sojourn;
- issuing of driving licences and the registration of motor vehicles;
- procurement, keeping and carrying of weapons and ammunition;
- explosive devices and substances;
- protection of the constitutional order;
- special police force tasks and the supervision over security agencies.

The Ministry is also responsible for the following: keeping the records and statistics concerning the internal affairs, the internal affairs information system and the education and training of the Ministry's officers.

== Organization ==
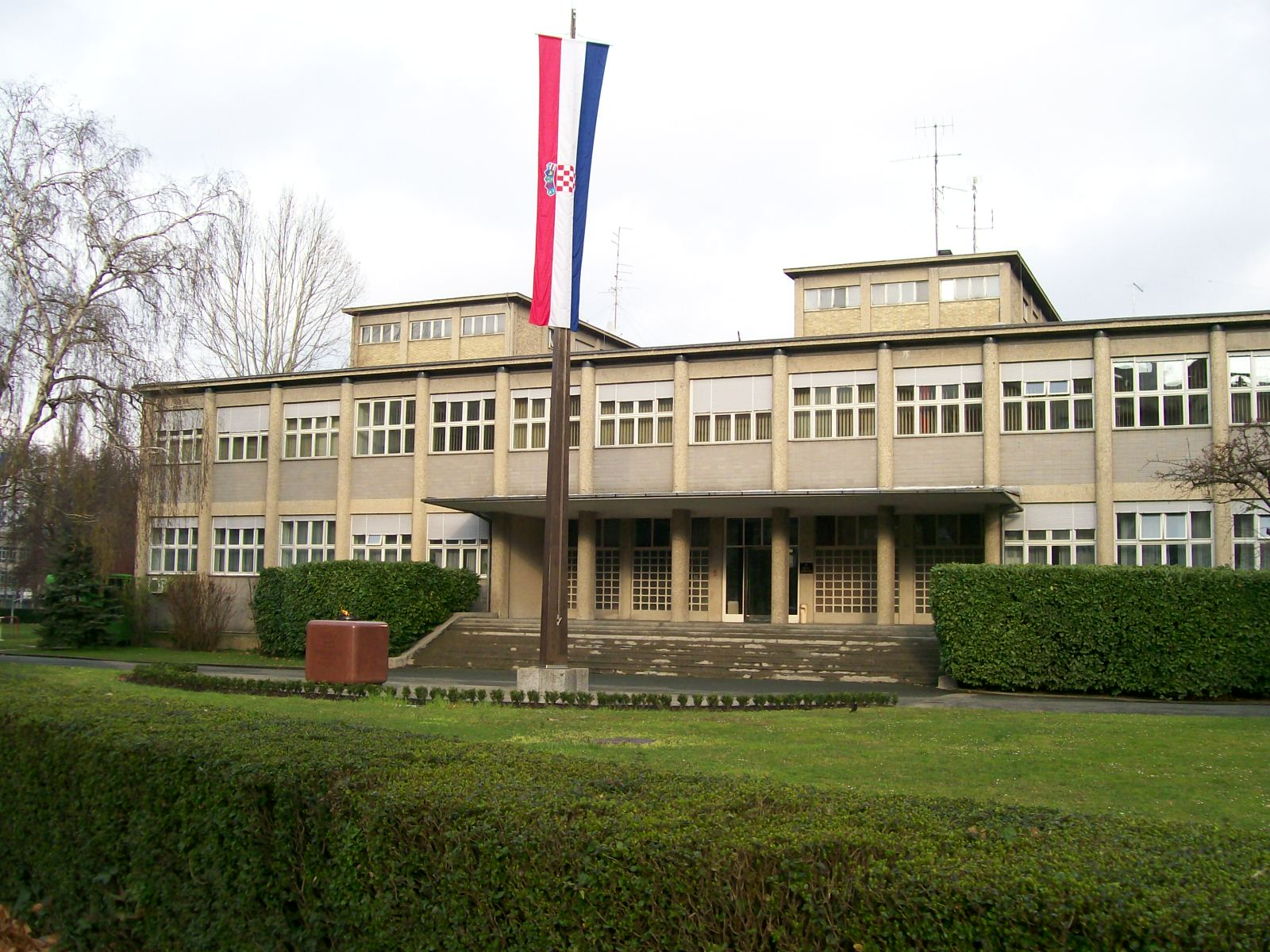
Ministry headquarters in Zagreb

- Minister's Cabinet (Kabinet ministra)
- General Police Directorate (Ravnateljstvo policije)
- Material and Financial Affairs Directorate (Uprava za materijalno financijske poslove)
- Directorate for Development, Equipment and Support (Uprava za razvoj, opremanje i potporu)
- Legal Affairs and Human Resources Directorate (Uprava za pravne poslove i ljudske potencijale)
- Administrative and Inspection Affairs Directorate (Uprava za upravne i inspekcijske poslove)
- European Integration and International Affairs Directorate (Uprava za europske integracije i međunarodne odnose)
- Special Security Affairs Directorate (Uprava za posebne poslove sigurnosti)

== General Police Directorate ==
The General Police Directorate is in charge of the national police. There are twenty geographical commands, and the national body is organised as follows:

Police Directorate

- Public Order Department
- Command of Intervention Police
- Department for Road Traffic Safety
- Bomb Disposal Department

Criminal Police Directorate

- General Crime Department
- Anti-terrorism and War Crime Department
- Organised Crime Department
- Economic Crime and Corruption Department
- Drugs Department
- Special Criminal Investigations Department
- Criminal Intelligence Analysis Department
- Protection Unit
- International Police Co-operation Department

Border Police Directorate

- Neighbouring Countries Department
- State Border Protection Department
- Maritime and Airport Police Department
- Illegal Migration Department
- Centre for Training of Dog Handlers and Dog Dressure
- Reception Centre for Foreigners
- Mobile Unit for Static Border Control

The following units exists at the same level:

- Operational Police Communication Centre
- Forensic Centre
- Police Academy

== List of ministers ==
Croatian Democratic Union (9)
Social Democratic Party (2)
The Bridge (1)
Independent (1)

No.	Portrait	Minister of the Interior	Took office	Left office	Time in office	Party	Cabinet
1	Josip Boljkovac	Josip Boljkovac (1920–2014)	30 May 1990	2 July 1991	1 year, 33 days	HDZ	Mesić; Manolić
2	Onesin Cvitan	Onesin Cvitan (born 1939)	2 July 1991	17 July 1991	15 days	HDZ	Manolić
3	Ivan Vekić	Ivan Vekić (1938–2014)	17 July 1991	15 April 1992	273 days	HDZ	Gregurić
4	Ivan Jarnjak [hr]	Ivan Jarnjak (born 1941)	15 April 1992	16 December 1996	4 years, 245 days	HDZ	Gregurić; Šarinić; Valentić; Mateša
5	Ivan Penić [hr]	Ivan Penić (born 1954)	16 December 1996	27 January 2000	3 years, 42 days	HDZ	Mateša
6	Šime Lučin	Šime Lučin (born 1958)	27 January 2000	23 December 2003	3 years, 330 days	SDP	Račan I–II
7	Marijan Mlinarić [hr]	Marijan Mlinarić (1943–2007)	23 December 2003	17 February 2005	1 year, 56 days	HDZ	Sanader I
8	Ivica Kirin	Ivica Kirin (born 1970)	17 February 2005	12 January 2008	2 years, 329 days	HDZ	Sanader I
9	Berislav Rončević	Berislav Rončević (born 1960)	12 January 2008	10 October 2008	272 days	HDZ	Sanader II
10	Tomislav Karamarko[a]	Tomislav Karamarko^{[a]} (born 1959)	10 October 2008	23 December 2011	272 days	Independent; HDZ	Sanader II; Kosor
11	Ranko Ostojić*	Ranko Ostojić* (born 1962)	23 December 2011	22 January 2016	4 years, 30 days	SDP	Milanović
12	Vlaho Orepić [hr]	Vlaho Orepić (born 1968)	22 January 2016	27 April 2017	1 year, 95 days	Most	Orešković; Plenković I
13	Davor Božinović*	Davor Božinović* (born 1961)	9 June 2017	Incumbent	9 years, 77 days	HDZ	Plenković I–II–III

(*) Ministers of Internal Affairs who held the post of Deputy Prime Minister of Croatia while in office.

=== Notes ===
a. Karamarko was appointed in the HDZ-dominated Sanader cabinet as a non-party minister. In 2009 he continued to serve in the Kosor cabinet and formally joined HDZ in September 2011.
