= Davor Božinović =

Croatian politician and diplomat (born 1961)

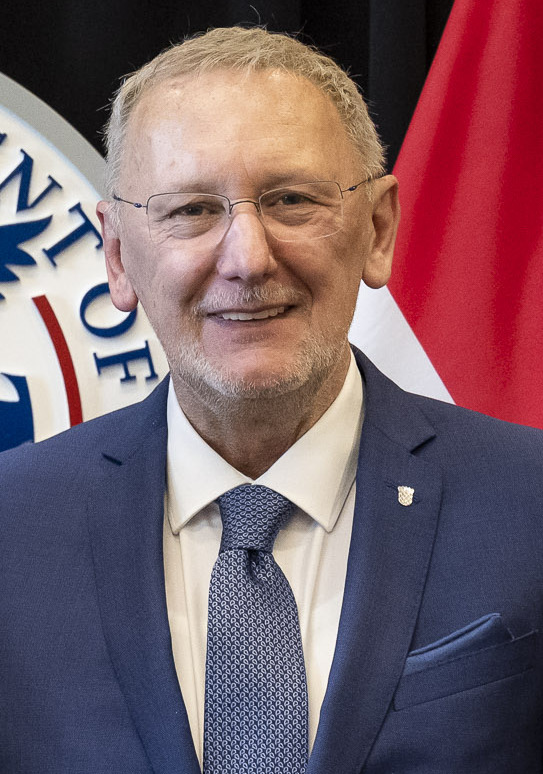
- Božinović in 2023

Deputy Prime Minister of Croatia
- Incumbent
- Assumed office 19 July 2019 Serving with Tomo Medved, Oleg Butković, Ivan Anušić, Branko Bačić, David Vlajčić and Tomislav Ćorić
- Prime Minister: Andrej Plenković
- Preceded by: Marija Pejčinović Burić

Minister of the Interior
- Incumbent
- Assumed office 9 June 2017
- Prime Minister: Andrej Plenković
- Preceded by: Vlaho Orepić

Minister of Defence
- In office 29 December 2010 – 23 December 2011
- Prime Minister: Jadranka Kosor
- Preceded by: Branko Vukelić
- Succeeded by: Ante Kotromanović

Chief of Staff of the Office of the President of Croatia
- In office 10 February 2004 – 30 September 2005
- President: Stjepan Mesić
- Preceded by: Željko Dobranović
- Succeeded by: Boris Šprem

Personal details
- Born: 27 December 1961 (age 64) Pula, PR Croatia, FPR Yugoslavia (modern Croatia)
- Party: Croatian Democratic Union
- Spouse: Jasna Božinović (m. 1988)
- Children: 2
- Education: University of Zagreb

Davor Božinović (Croatian pronunciation: [dâʋor boʒǐːnoʋitɕ]; born 27 December 1961) is a Croatian diplomat and politician who has served as minister of the interior since 2017 and deputy prime minister of Croatia since 2019. He previously served as minister of defence from 2010 to 2011.

Born in Pula in a family descended from Bay of Kotor, to a father who was a Yugoslav naval officer, Božinović graduated from the Zagreb Faculty of Political Sciences, where he was a mentor to Tomislav Ljubičić. He specialized in People's Defense and Self-Protection, a distinctly Yugoslav socialist concept of popular mobilization for guerrilla defense/insurgency and civil protection, earning master's degree and PhD. In 1987, Božinović joined Socialist Croatia's Ministry of Defence.

He served as an ambassador of Croatia to Serbia and Montenegro from 2002 to 2004. In 2004, he was appointed as head of the Office of the President of Croatia Stjepan Mesić. From 2005 to 2008, he served as Head of Mission of the Republic of Croatia to NATO. In September 2008, he was appointed State Secretary for European integration at the Ministry of Foreign Affairs and European Integration (MVPEI), and in July 2009 as State Secretary for Political Affairs at the same ministry.

== See also ==
- Cabinet of Andrej Plenković I
- Cabinet of Andrej Plenković II
- Cabinet of Andrej Plenković III
