= Neretva Delta =

Delta of the Neretva river in Croatia

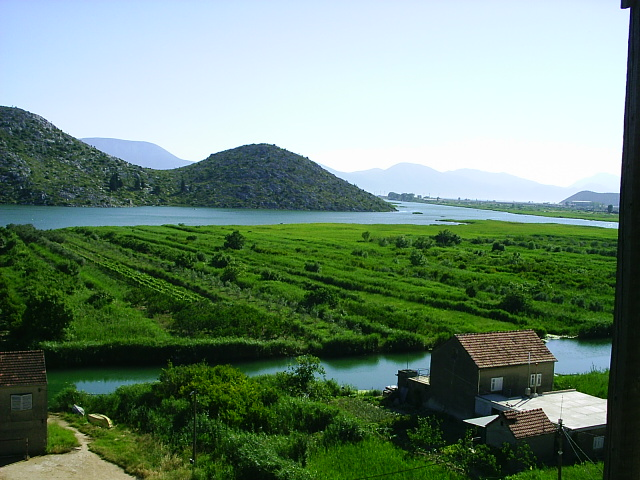
- Neretva Delta, near the estuary, Lower Neretva

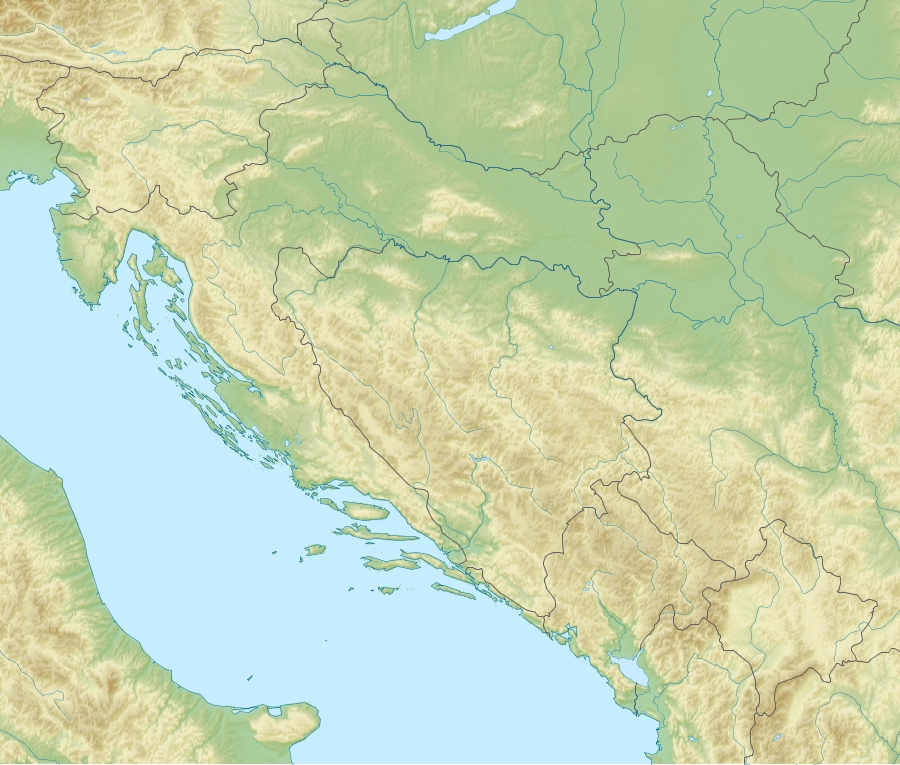
- Neretva Delta Neretva Delta (Dinaric Alps)

Physical characteristics
- Mouth
  - coordinates: 43.01971°N 17.44523°E

Designations

Ramsar Wetland
- Official name: Neretva River Delta
- Designated: 18 January 1993
- Reference no.: 585

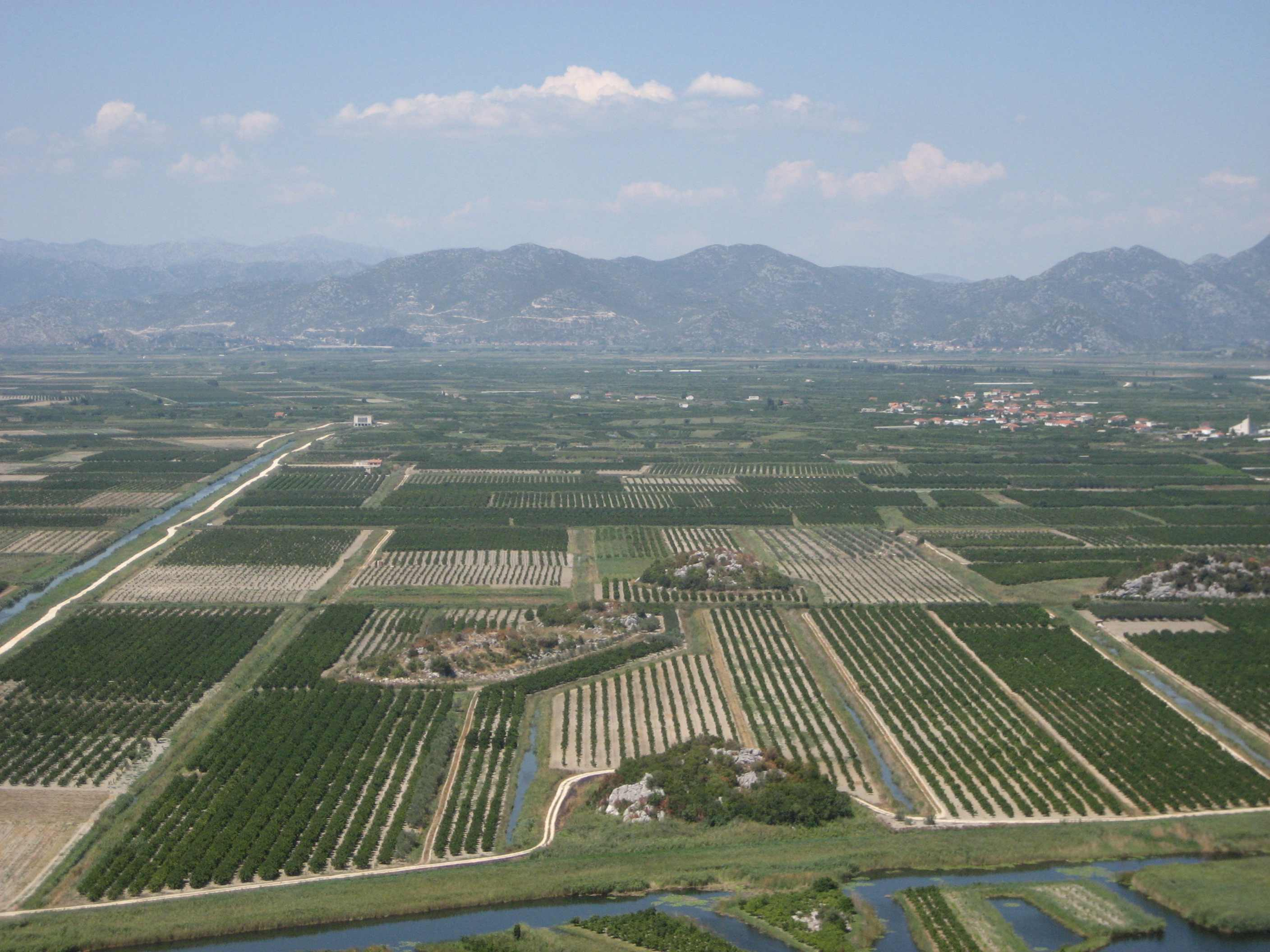
The delta has been largely cultivated for agriculture.

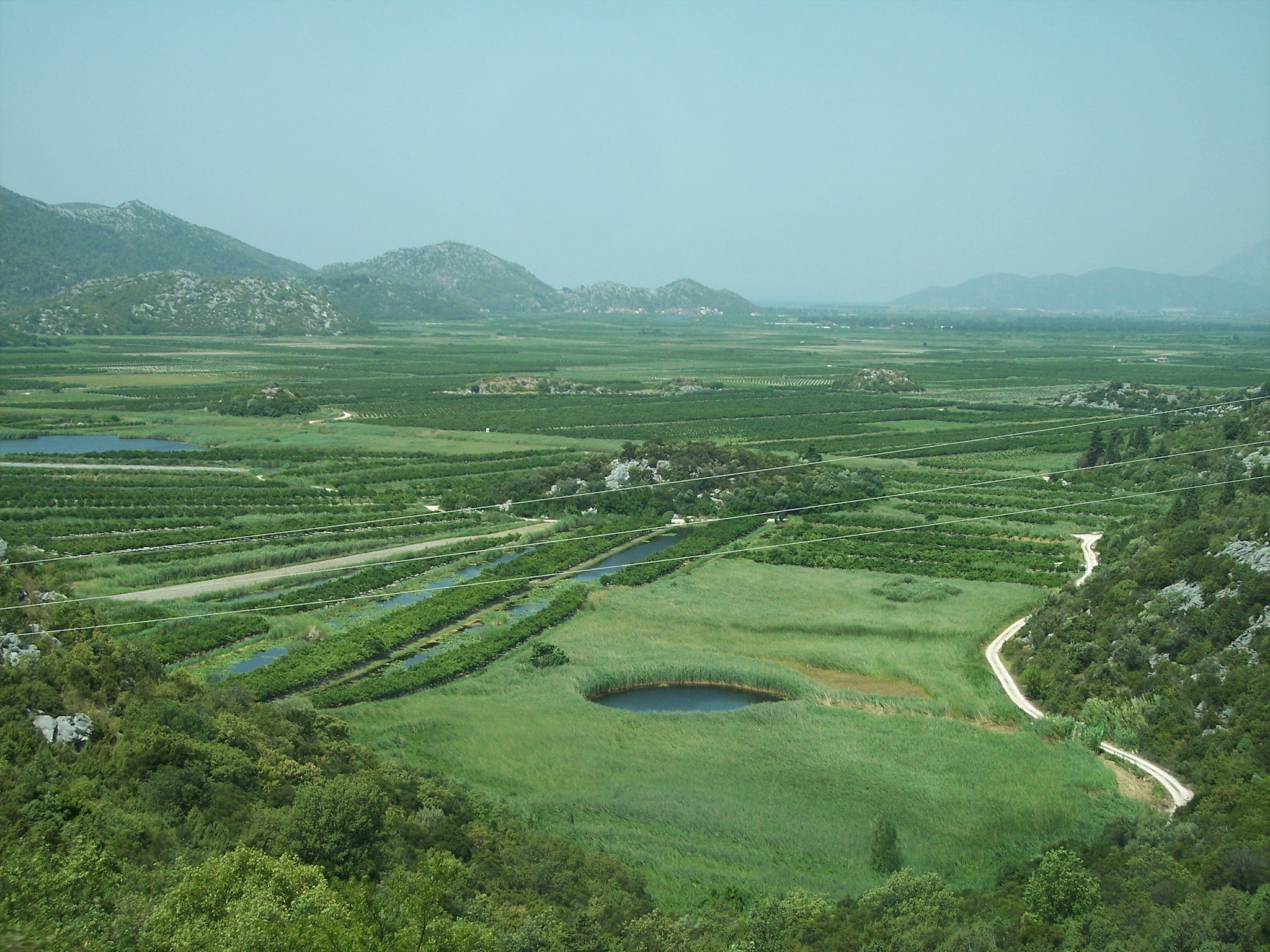
The fresh water from the river allows for green fields that are visibly distinct from the surrounding rugged karst terrain.

Neretva Delta is the river delta of the Neretva, a river that flows through Bosnia and Herzegovina and Croatia and empties in the Adriatic Sea. The delta is a unique landscape in southern Croatia, and a wetland that is listed under the Ramsar Convention as internationally important, as the wetland extends into the Hutovo Blato in Herzegovina.

The total alluvial area of the delta is estimated at around 19,000 ha (73 sq mi), while today the delta takes up roughly 11,490 ha (44.4 sq mi).

A total of 1,620 ha (6.3 sq mi) of the delta are designated protected areas:

- ornithological reserves: Prud, Orepak, Podgredom
- ornithological and ichthyological reserve at the river mouth
- protected landscape: lake Modro oko

An additional 1200 ha of nature in the delta is not protected. In 2003, the Ministry of Environment and Spatial Planning organized a public discussion about the proposal to make the delta a nature park. In 2007, the experts from the State Institute for Nature Protection made another formal proposal for the Neretva Delta to become a nature park. A public discussion process was started but quickly terminated by the Ministry of Culture, allegedly because of protests from the local government.
