= Mario Banožić =

Croatian politician (born 1979)

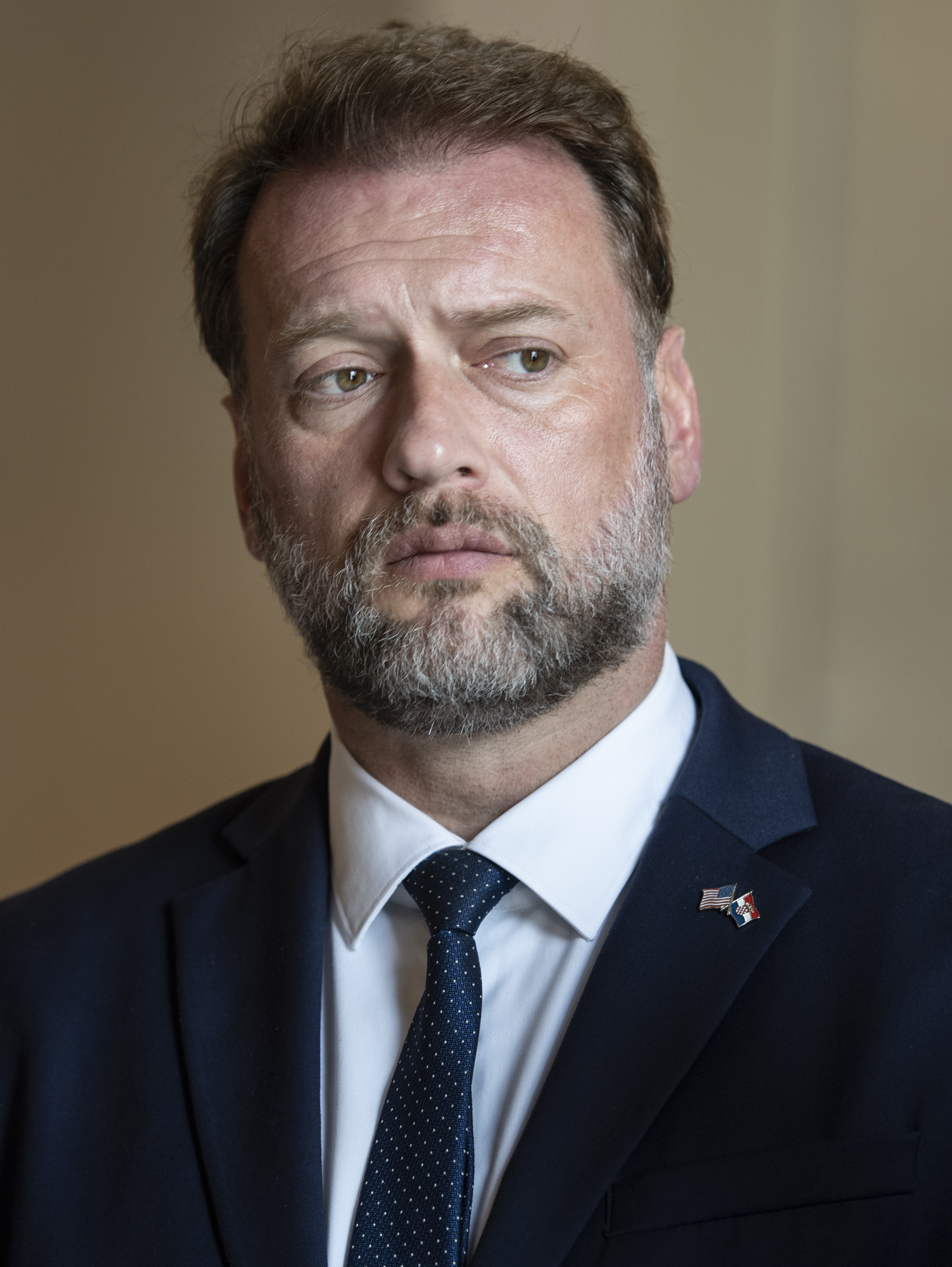
- Banožić in 2023

Minister of Defence
- In office 23 July 2020 – 11 November 2023
- Prime Minister: Andrej Plenković
- Preceded by: Damir Krstičević
- Succeeded by: Ivan Anušić

Minister of State Property
- In office 22 July 2019 – 23 July 2020
- Prime Minister: Andrej Plenković
- Preceded by: Goran Marić
- Succeeded by: Darko Horvat (Minister of Construction, Physical Planning and State Property)

Personal details
- Born: 10 March 1979 (age 47) Vinkovci, SR Croatia, SFR Yugoslavia
- Party: Croatian Democratic Union
- Education: University of Osijek

Mario Banožić (born 10 March 1979) is a Croatian politician who served as Minister of State Property from 2019 until 2020, and as Minister of Defence from 2020 to 2023. He was dismissed from the latter position after causing a traffic accident in which a father of two children died.

== See also ==
- Cabinet of Andrej Plenković I
- Cabinet of Andrej Plenković II
