= Onesin Cvitan =

Croatian jurist and politician

Minister of the Interior
- In office 2 July 1991 – 17 July 1991
- Prime Minister: Josip Manolić
- Preceded by: Josip Boljkovac
- Succeeded by: Ivan Vekić

Mayor of Split
- In office 1990–1991
- Preceded by: Gordana Kosanović
- Succeeded by: Petar Slapničar

Personal details
- Born: 16 February 1939 (age 87) Tribunj, Kingdom of Yugoslavia
- Party: Croatian Democratic Union
- Education: University of Zagreb; University of Split
- Occupation: Lawyer

Onesin Cvitan (born 16 February 1939) is a Croatian jurist and politician. He briefly served as interior minister in the Cabinet of Josip Manolić in July 1991, during the early stages of the 1991–95 Croatian War of Independence.

Born in the town of Tribunj on the Dalmatian coast, Cvitan was schooled in Korčula, Split and Zagreb. He graduated from the University of Zagreb's Faculty of Law in 1970, and earned his doctorate at the University of Split in 1977.

Before serving as interior minister he was Mayor of Split from 1990 to 1991. In 1992 he was appointed Croatia's ambassador to Ukraine, and from 1995 to 1997 he was ambassador to Macedonia. In 1997 he returned to teach at the University of Split Law School.
