= Nina Obuljen Koržinek =

Croatian violinist and political scientist

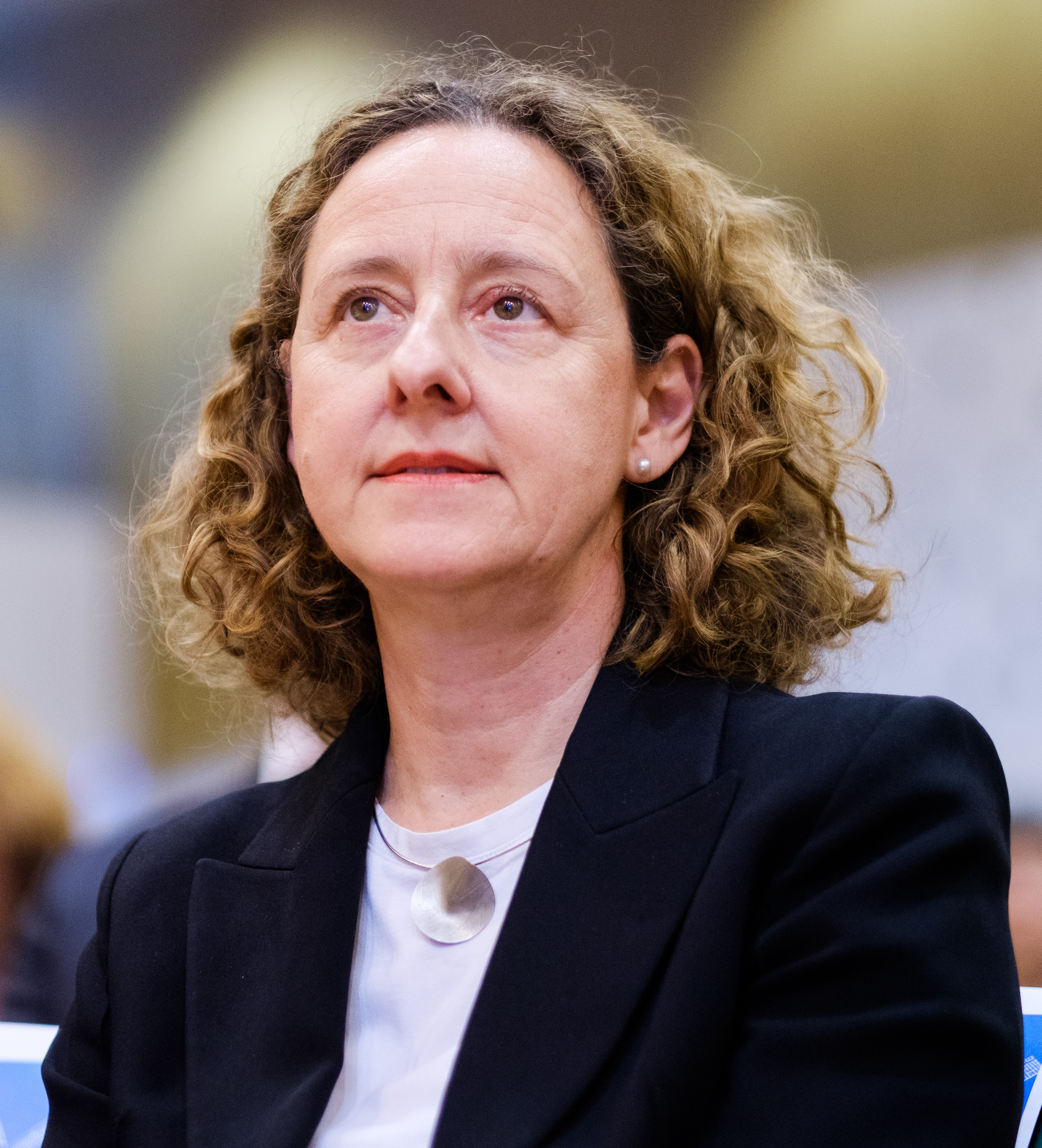
- Obuljen Koržinek in 2024

Minister of Culture and Media
- Incumbent
- Assumed office 19 October 2016
- Prime Minister: Andrej Plenković
- Preceded by: Zlatko Hasanbegović

Personal details
- Born: Nina Obuljen; 27 May 1970 (age 56) Dubrovnik, SR Croatia, SFR Yugoslavia (modern Croatia)
- Party: Croatian Democratic Union
- Spouse: Hrvoje Koržinek
- Parent: Nikola Obuljen (father)
- Education: University of Zagreb

Nina Obuljen Koržinek (born 27 May 1970) is a Croatian violinist and political scientist serving as Minister of Culture and Media since 2016.

== Early life and education ==
Nina Obuljen Koržinek was born in 1970 in Dubrovnik, in the family of Nikola Ćićo Obuljen who served as mayor of Dubrovnik from 1993 until 1997. After finishing elementary and high school in her hometown she enrolled in the University of Zagreb's Academy of Music, from which she graduated violin, and Faculty of Humanities and Social Sciences, from which she graduated French language and comparative literature. Since 2013, she holds PhD in political science from the Faculty of Political Science of the University of Zagreb where she defended her doctoral thesis "Impact of international integration processes on the changes of scope of national cultural policies". In addition, she graduated from the Diplomatic Academy of the Ministry of Foreign Affairs of Croatia.

== See also ==
- Cabinet of Andrej Plenković
- Cabinet of Andrej Plenković II
- Cabinet of Andrej Plenković III
