= Marija Vučković =

Croatian politician (born 1974)

- Vučković in 2026

Minister of Environmental Protection and Green Transition
- Incumbent
- Assumed office 17 May 2024
- Prime Minister: Andrej Plenković
- Preceded by: Ministry created

Minister of Agriculture
- In office 22 July 2019 – 17 May 2024
- Prime Minister: Andrej Plenković
- Preceded by: Tomislav Tolušić
- Succeeded by: Josip Dabro

Personal details
- Born: 3 July 1974 (age 52) Mostar, SR Bosnia and Herzegovina, SFR Yugoslavia (modern Bosnia and Herzegovina)
- Party: Croatian Democratic Union
- Education: University of Zagreb

Marija Vučković (born 3 July 1974) is a Croatian politician serving as the Minister for Environmental Protection and Green Transition since 17 May 2024. She served as the Minister of Agriculture in the first and second cabinet led by Prime Minister Andrej Plenković, but since may 2024 has served as Minister of Environmental Protection and Green Transition in his third cabinet.

== Personal life ==
She studied at the University of Zagreb.

== See also ==
- Cabinet of Andrej Plenković I
- Cabinet of Andrej Plenković II
- Cabinet of Andrej Plenković III
