= Oleg Butković =

Croatian politician (born 1979)

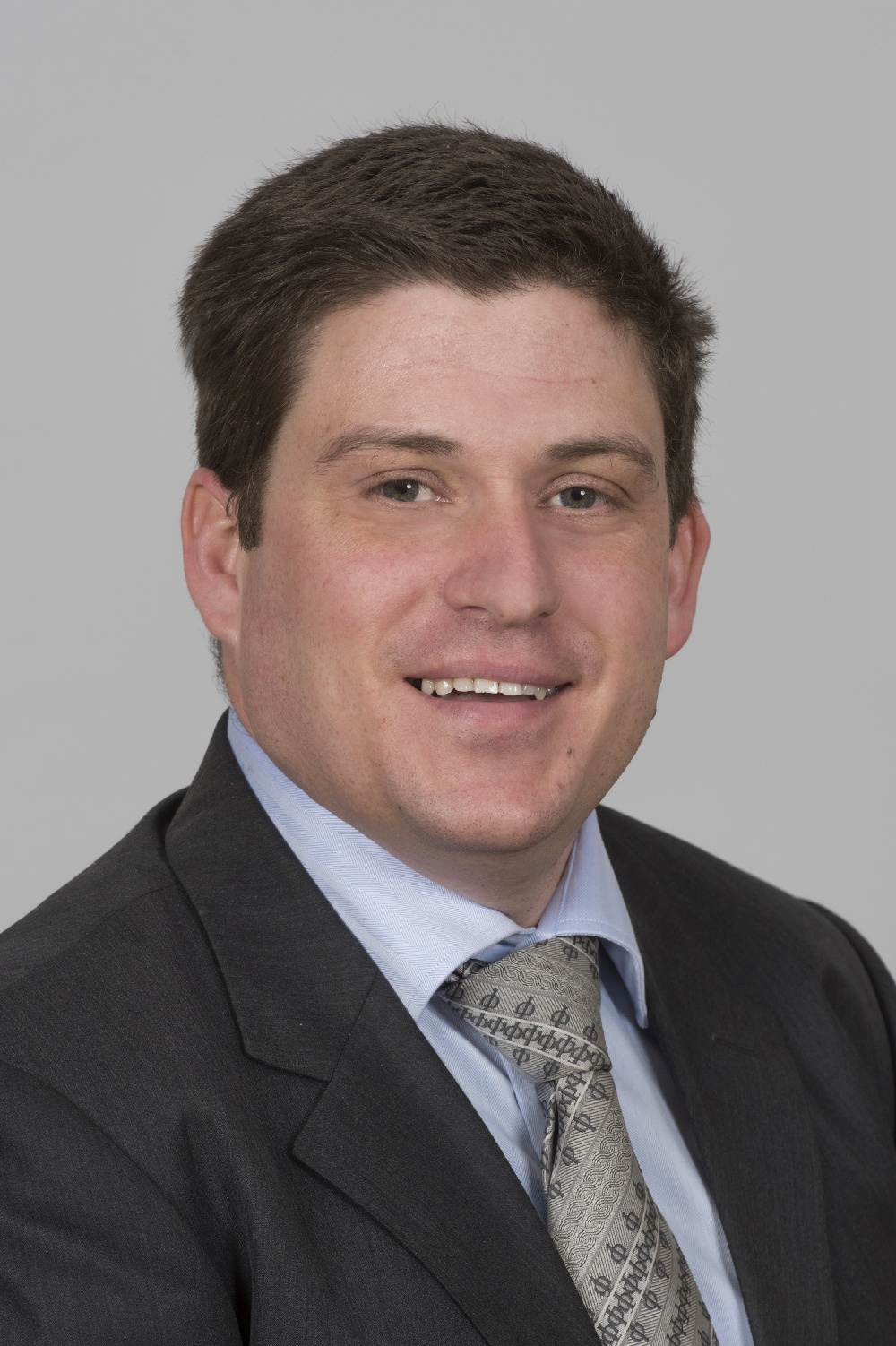
- Official portrait, 2016

Deputy Prime Minister of Croatia
- Incumbent
- Assumed office 15 July 2022 Serving with Tomo Medved, Davor Božinović, Ivan Anušić, Branko Bačić, David Vlajčić and Tomislav Ćorić
- Prime Minister: Andrej Plenković
- Preceded by: Zdravko Marić

Minister of Maritime Affairs, Transport and Infrastructure
- Incumbent
- Assumed office 22 January 2016
- Prime Minister: Tihomir Orešković; Andrej Plenković
- Preceded by: Siniša Hajdaš Dončić

Mayor of Novi Vinodolski
- In office 2005 – 22 January 2016
- Preceded by: Milivoj Vidmar
- Succeeded by: Velimir Piškulić

Personal details
- Born: 4 May 1979 (age 47) Rijeka, SR Croatia, SFR Yugoslavia (modern Croatia)
- Party: Croatian Democratic Union
- Spouse: Barbara Butković (m. 2006)
- Children: 2
- Education: University of Rijeka

Oleg Butković (born 4 May 1979) is a Croatian politician who has served as minister of maritime affairs, transport and infrastructure since 2016. He assumed the position in the cabinet of Tihomir Orešković and continued to hold the position in the first, second and third cabinet of Andrej Plenković. He is also serving as one of the deputy prime ministers, assuming office following Zdravko Marić's 2022 resignation.

== Early life and career ==
Butković was born in Rijeka in the Primorje region to mother Emilija and father Srećko. After finishing school in 1998, he graduated from the Faculty of Maritime Studies at the University of Rijeka in 2002.

He was elected mayor of Novi Vinodolski in 2005, a position he would hold until 2016 when he became the Minister of Maritime Affairs, Transport and Infrastructure in the cabinet of Tihomir Orešković, and later Andrej Plenković. While mayor, he began climbing the ranks in the Croatian Democratic Union, first becoming president of the party's Novi Vinodolski city council, then in 2012 as member of the Central committee, and in 2020 vice-president.

== Minister of Maritime Affairs, Transport and Infrastructure (2016–present) ==
=== Roadways ===
In 2018, two years after taking the office, Hrvatske Ceste and CRBC signed a €276 million contract to build the Pelješac bridge which would connect Dubrovnik with the rest of the country. The construction lasted for four years and the total cost ended up being €471 million, including new roads and the Ston bypass. The European Commission allocated €375 million for the bridge's construction. During the opening ceremony, Butković said: “Because it is not only a bridge in terms of infrastructure, it will shorten the travel time, but also bring benefits in the economy and in every other sense.” In 2021, works started on the new €200 million Učka Tunnel on the A8 motorway, so that traffic does not have to share just one tunnel which was built in 1981. The new tunnel was opened in September 2024, and the old tunnel completed renovation in September 2025. It was a part of broader construction of the Istrian Y, a project that aims to better connect Istria with the rest of the country via a motorway.

Under Butković, Croatian Motorways added the last 11 km (6.8 mi) to the A11 motorway in 2024, connecting Sisak with Zagreb after 18 years of construction. Its full length is 47 km (29 mi), providing a shorter journey between the two cities. In October 2025, the final 5 km (3.1 mi) of the A5 motorway were opened, which started construction in 2007, connecting Hungary with Bosnia and Herzegovina in its 88 km (55 mi) length. It is a part of the Pan-European Corridor Vc.

=== Railways ===
Croatia increased its investment in railway infrastructure under Butković, mostly thanks to ECB loans and EU funds. In 2016, HŽ Infrastruktura signed a contract to upgrade the tracks from Dugo Selo to Križevci, and in 2020 from Križevci to the border with Hungary. The whole project is worth half a billion euros and includes the construction of a new second track and the reconstruction of the existing one, as well as replacing the overhead wires and construction of new overpasses and underpasses, effectively eliminating all train crossings. The maximum speed will be raised to 160 km/h (99 mph). Both projects missed their deadlines, and are scheduled to be completed in mid-2026.

Other investments in railway infrastructure include replacing the tracks and sleepers from Knin to Zadar and from Kloštar Podravski via Varaždin to Čakovec. New planned routes include railway connections to Zagreb, Split and Zadar airports, as well as a new railway track towards Rijeka.

=== Air ===
Although plans for reconstruction of the Split Airport passenger terminal have begun during the Milanović government in 2015, the official contract was signed in December 2016 with Butković's approval. Construction was completed and the terminal was opened in 2019, and in 2024 works began on a new €17 million passenger terminal which will be connected with a port to automatically transport people to the many islands on the coast. Butković was also present during the opening of the new Zagreb Airport passenger terminal in 2017; however, it was built by the previous administration.

=== Mail services ===
During Butković's reign, the Croatian Post saw the largest cycle of investment in its history worth €160 million. The construction of a new €46.5 million package sorting center in Velika Gorica began in May 2017, and opened in September 2019. The total area of the facility is 32,000 square metres (38,000 sq yd), with a processing capacity of 15,000 packets an hour. The company's headquarters were relocated next to the facility soon after. In March 2022, a new package sorting center worth €8 million was opened in the Bakar-Kukuljanovo industrial zone near the City of Rijeka. It serves Istria, Primorje and Gorski Kotar. The two centers aim to make the processing of mail more efficient and support the company's growing parcel delivery service.

== Controversies ==
=== Jadrolinija incident ===
On 12 August 2024, three Jadrolinija crewmembers died and one severely injured after a ship's ramp collapsed on them in the port of Mali Lošinj. The cause of the fall of the multi-tonne ramp was when the steel cable that lifts it broke, sending it towards the four servicemen standing below. Neither did the chairperson of Jadrolinija David Sopta nor Butković resign, who publicly avoided commenting the accident. On 12 September, he came before the press to admit his wrongdoing. He said that he “made a human and a political mistake” and that he should have visited the place of accident sooner. He said he thought about resigning, but concluded against it to “see what happened and what will be concluded”. He was even criticized among members inside his own party, the HDZ, for mismanaging the crisis. Egon Matešić, the company's executive director, was fired in September, and David Sopta in February 2025 after an investigation found him guilty; Butković was never sanctioned for the accident.

=== Conflict of interest ===
In July 2019, Josipa Rimac (now Plesić) asked Butković to hire a young engineer and her friend Ante Grgić at the IGH Institute, a civil engineering and research firm. Butković responded with "I've sorted it out, they'll call him in two or three days" and "Ante starts working on 1st October in Rijeka in supervision [department]." When the text messaged first appeared in public in April 2024, Butković responded with “How could I influence employment in a private company?” and that he doesn’t remember the messages. Despite that, in September 2025, he was fined €3,000 by the Committee for Determining Conflict of Interest for mediating the employment.

== Personal life ==
Oleg Butković married his wife Barbara in 2006, with whom he has two sons. He also has a brother. He owns a house in Novi Vinodolski.

== See also ==
- Cabinet of Andrej Plenković I
- Cabinet of Andrej Plenković II
- Cabinet of Andrej Plenković III
