= Anja Šimpraga =

Croatian politician

- Ања Шимпрага
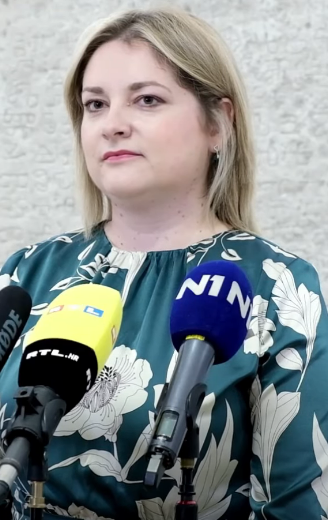
- Šimpraga in 2022

Deputy Prime Minister of Croatia
- In office 29 April 2022 – 17 May 2024
- Prime Minister: Andrej Plenković
- Preceded by: Boris Milošević
- Succeeded by: Josip Dabro

Minister without portfolio Responsibility for Social Affairs and Human and Minority Rights
- In office 29 April 2022 – 17 May 2024
- Prime Minister: Andrej Plenković

Member of the Croatian Parliament
- In office 23 July 2020 – 29 April 2022
- Preceded by: Boris Milošević
- Succeeded by: Boris Milošević

Personal details
- Born: 23 July 1987 (age 39) Knin, SR Croatia, SFR Yugoslavia
- Party: Independent Democratic Serb Party (SDSS)
- Education: University of Zagreb
- Occupation: Politician

Anja Šimpraga (Serbian Cyrillic: Ања Шимпрага; born 23 July 1987) is a Croatian politician serving as a Deputy Prime Minister of Croatia and a minister without portfolio in charge of social affairs and human and minority rights from 2022 to 2024. Previously, she served as a member of the Croatian Parliament from 2020 to 2022. An ethnic Serb, Šimpraga is a member of the Independent Democratic Serb Party (SDSS).

== Biography ==
Šimpraga was born on 23 July 1987 in Knin, in the SR Croatia, SFR Yugoslavia. During the Croatian War of Independence, Knin was controlled by the separatist Republic of Serbian Krajina until the Operation Storm in 1995 when the Croatian Army regained control of Knin and the rest of Krajina. Following the operation, Šimpraga became a refugee, fleeing Knin to Serbia with her family. Šimpraga later returned to Croatia and became a member of the Independent Democratic Serb Party (SDSS) at the age of 18.

She graduated at the Faculty of Agriculture, University of Zagreb and later obtained a degree in food technology from the Marko Marulić Polytechnic University in Knin.

From 2016 to 2020, Šimpraga was the deputy prefect of the Šibenik-Knin County. She was sworn in as a member of the Croatian Parliament following the appointment of SDSS MP Boris Milošević as a government minister. On 31 July 2020, five days before the 25th anniversary of the liberation of Knin and the Victory Day, Šimpraga spoke in front of the Parliament about her experience as an eight-year-old in the column of Operation Storm refugees. Due to the lack of discourse in Croatia on civilian Serb victims of Operation Storm, Šimpraga's speech was widely dubbed "important", "powerful" and "historical". On 29 April 2022, Šimpraga was appointed a deputy prime minister of Croatia and a minister without portfolio in charge of social affairs and human and minority rights, succeeding Milošević who once again became an MP.

== Personal life ==
Šimpraga is married and lives in Radučić.
