= Damir Krstičević =

Croatian politician and general

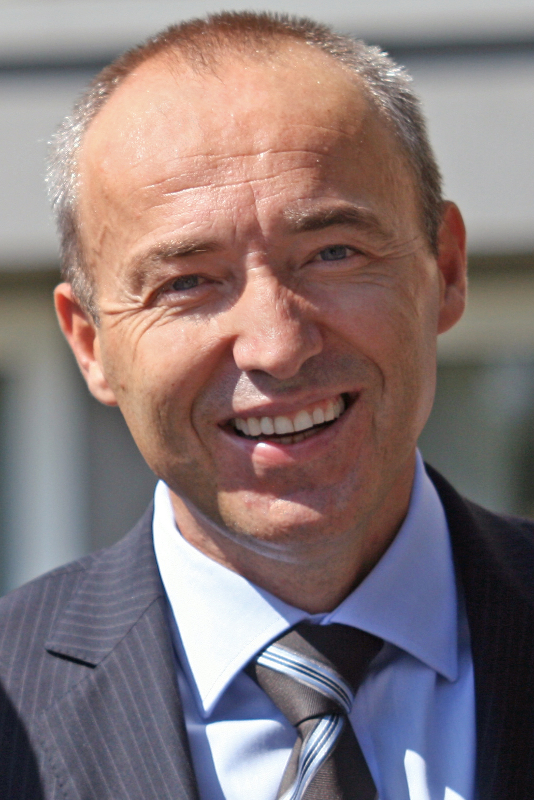
- Krstičević in September 2011

Deputy Prime Minister of Croatia
- In office 19 October 2016 – 8 May 2020
- Prime Minister: Andrej Plenković
- Preceded by: Tomislav Karamarko; Božo Petrov
- Succeeded by: Tomo Medved

Minister of Defence
- In office 19 October 2016 – 8 May 2020
- Prime Minister: Andrej Plenković
- Preceded by: Josip Buljević
- Succeeded by: Mario Banožić

Personal details
- Born: 1 July 1969 (age 57) Vrgorac, SR Croatia, SFR Yugoslavia
- Party: Croatian Democratic Union

Military service
- Allegiance: Croatia
- Branch/service: Croatian Army
- Rank: Major general
- Commands: 4th Guards Brigade
- Battles/wars: Croatian War of Independence: Operation Maslenica; Operation Winter '94; Operation Summer '95; Operation Storm

Damir Krstičević (Croatian pronunciation: [dȁmīr kȑstičević]; born 1 July 1969) is a Croatian general and politician who served as the Minister of Defence and Deputy Prime Minister from 2016 until his resignation in May 2020, which he tendered due to the deaths of two Croatian military pilots in an aircraft accident.

== Biography ==
Krstičević was born on July 1, 1969, in Vrgorac, Split-Dalmatia County in SFR Yugoslavia. Since his childhood, he knew he wanted to be a soldier. He finished military high school in Sarajevo. Upon graduating from the Military Academy in Belgrade, Yugoslavia broke up. He joined the Croatian National Guard in the summer of 1991. He was assigned to the 4th Guards Brigade, where he eventually rose to the position of the brigade's commander.

After the war, in 1997, he was sent to continue his education at United States Army War College.

In 2000, he was one of the signatories of the Twelve Generals' Letter, which resulted in Krstičević's retiring by then–Croatian president Stjepan Mesić. He then worked as a manager, ceo, procurator and member of the supervisory board in computer software developing companies M SAN and King ICT.

In 2007, he survived a helicopter crash in Vukovar, which damaged his spine.

After HDZ won the Croatian parliamentary elections in 2016 and Andrej Plenković became the new Croatian Prime Minister, Krstičević was assigned to the position of Croatian Deputy Prime Minister and Minister of Defence.

In 2016, Bosnian Serb officials filed a criminal complaint, alleging that Krstičević and other high-ranking Croatian officials were responsible for war crimes during the Bosnian War offensive Operation Mistral 2. Bosnian authorities were also investigating Krstičević for crimes during the operation that included the massacre of 32 Serb civilians. Krstičević denied the allegations, stating that his unit was not present there.

In January 2018, he was inducted into the U.S. Army War College Hall of Fame.

In 2018, he drew criticism for praising Operation Medak Pocket saying it was "something to be proud of" despite the fact that Serb civilians were unlawfully killed, in addition he faced heavy criticism for legitimizing the presence of convicted war criminal Mirko Norac at an anniversary 'commemorating' the attack.

In May 2020, he resigned from his post as Defence Minister after the deaths of two Croatian military pilots in an aircraft accident.

== See also ==
- Cabinet of Andrej Plenković
