= Tomislav Ćorić =

Croatian politician

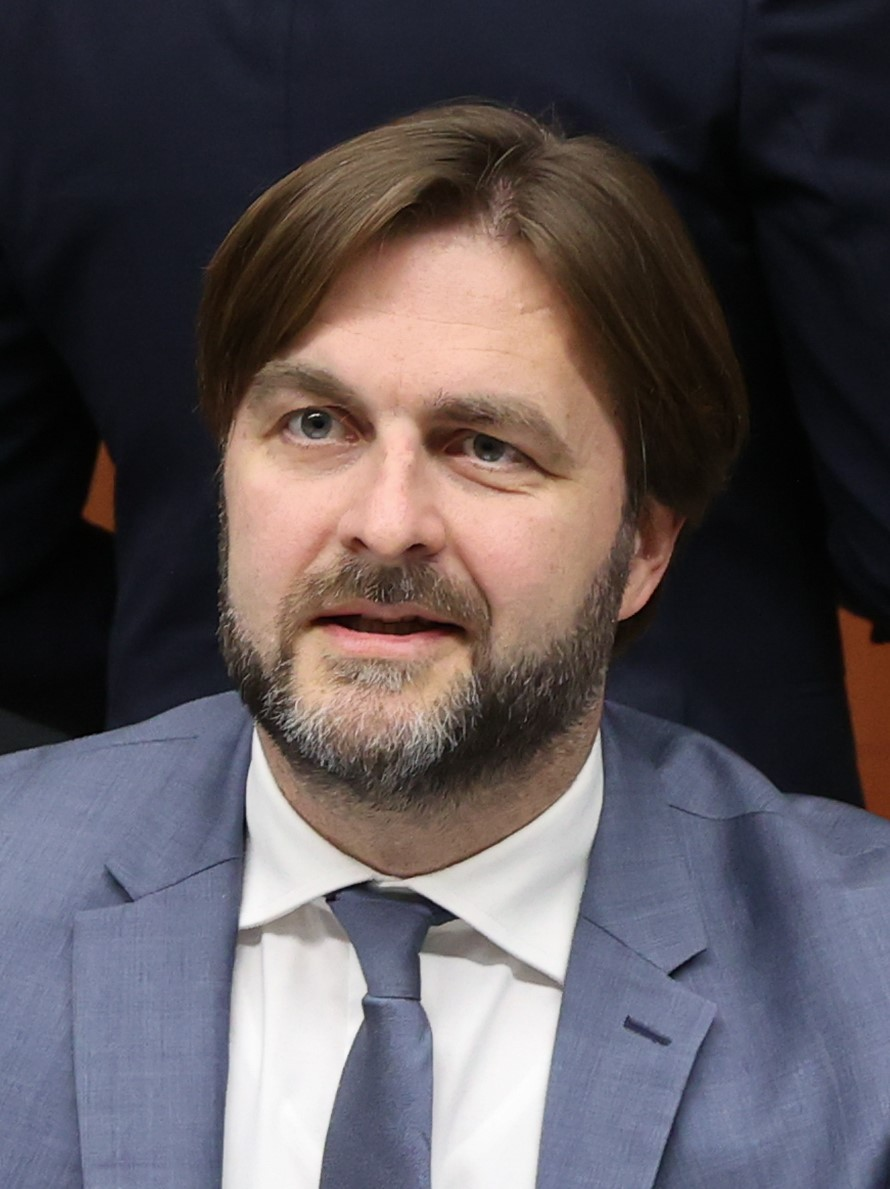
- Ćorić in 2026

Deputy Prime Minister of Croatia
- Incumbent
- Assumed office 29 January 2026 Serving with Tomo Medved, Davor Božinović, Oleg Butković, Ivan Anušić, Branko Bačić and David Vlajčić
- Prime Minister: Andrej Plenković
- Preceded by: Marko Primorac

Minister of Finance
- Incumbent
- Assumed office 29 January 2026
- Prime Minister: Andrej Plenković
- Preceded by: Marko Primorac

Minister of Economy and Sustainable Development
- In office 23 July 2020 – 29 April 2022
- Prime Minister: Andrej Plenković
- Preceded by: Darko Horvat
- Succeeded by: Davor Filipović

Minister of Environmental Protection and Energy
- In office 9 June 2017 – 23 July 2020
- Prime Minister: Andrej Plenković
- Preceded by: Slaven Dobrović; Marijo Šiljeg (acting)
- Succeeded by: Position abolished

Minister of Labour and Pension System
- In office 19 October 2016 – 9 June 2017
- Prime Minister: Andrej Plenković
- Preceded by: Nada Šikić
- Succeeded by: Marko Pavić

Personal details
- Born: 17 November 1979 (age 46) Metković, SR Croatia, SFR Yugoslavia (modern Croatia)
- Party: Croatian Democratic Union (2016–present)
- Education: University of Zagreb; University of Greenwich

Tomislav Ćorić (born 17 November 1979) is a Croatian politician who has served as minister of finance and deputy prime minister of Croatia since 2026. In 2016, after the victory of the HDZ-led coalition in the parliamentary elections, Ćorić began representing the Ministry of Labour and Pension System in the first cabinet of Andrej Plenković. In 2017, he became minister of environmental protection and energy. Ćorić focused on the waste management system during his time, investing more money into the systems. However, he drew controversy for sending Croatian oil for processing to a Hungarian refinery instead of the Rijeka refinery. He was also accused of being friends with people with corruption charges like Josipa Rimac and Dragan Kovačević.

In 2020, he left the role of minister of environmental protection and began representing the Ministry of Economy and Sustainable Development until 2022 when he was succeeded by Davor Filipović. During the start of the Russian invasion of Ukraine, Ćorić started leading the newly-created Gas Crisis Team to organize Croatia's gas supply and distribution, although the team stopped meeting in 2023. In May 2022, after his term as minister of economy, he was proposed as vice governor of the Croatian National Bank. He was confirmed as vice governor of the bank on 27 May 2022 by the Croatian Parliament, where he is in charge of multiple different offices. He is also a member of the Board of Supervisors of the European Banking Authority.

== Early life ==
Ćorić was born on 17 November 1979 in Metković. In 2003 he graduated as a Bachelor of Economics from the Faculty of Economics at the University of Zagreb. He later earned his master's in 2007 and his PhD in 2011 from the same university, both in economics.

== See also ==
- Cabinet of Andrej Plenković I
- Cabinet of Andrej Plenković II
