= Josip Boljkovac =

Croatian politician

Minister of the Interior
- In office 30 May 1990 – 2 July 1991
- Prime Minister: Stjepan Mesić (1990); Josip Manolić (1990–1991)
- Preceded by: Office established
- Succeeded by: Onesin Cvitan

Personal details
- Born: 12 November 1920 Vukova Gorica, Kingdom of Serbs, Croats and Slovenes
- Died: 10 November 2014 (aged 93) Karlovac, Croatia
- Party: League of Communists of Yugoslavia (–1990); Croatian Democratic Union (1990–1994); Croatian Independent Democrats
- Children: Matija (Jugoslav) Boljkovac

Josip Boljkovac (Croatian pronunciation: [jǒsip bǒʎkovat͡s]; 12 November 1920 – 10 November 2014) was a Croatian politician who served as the first Minister of Internal Affairs in the Croatian Government, thus being one of the closest associates of former President Franjo Tudjman.

== Biography ==
Born in Vukova Gorica near Karlovac, Boljkovac was an active member of the anti-fascist movement before World War II.

During World War II, Boljkovac fought with the Yugoslav Partisans since the very beginning of the anti-fascist uprising. He even met Randolph Churchill during his military mission. After the war, he served as the local chief of the Yugoslav secret police OZNA in Karlovac. He was later appointed as mayor of Karlovac, a post he held from 1963 to 1969.

After democratic reforms in Croatia in 1990, Boljkovac joined the conservative Croatian Democratic Union (HDZ) and became the country's first Minister of Internal Affairs. He was removed from office by Tudjman one year later.

Profiling himself as a moderate, in 1994 he left the party and became a fierce critic of Tudjman's policy. He joined the Croatian Independent Democrats (HND) and later, with that party's marginalization, the liberal Croatian People's Party (HNS). Boljkovac also ran on the electoral list of the Croatian Party of Pensioners (HSU) and the Independent Democratic Serb Party (SDSS) in separate elections.

In 2008, Boljkovac launched a bid to form a Josip Broz Tito Society, to celebrate the role of the former Yugoslav president.

Local police investigated Boljkovac's role in World War II and post-war SR Croatia, which led to his arrest on 2 November 2011 on charges of war crimes for his role in the massacre of 21 civilians in the vicinity of Duga Resa in May 1945. He was transferred to Remetinec prison where he was detained for one month due to the severity of the charges. After only two days in detention, he was transferred to a hospital for prisoners due to his bad health. Following the appeal to the Constitutional Court, charges against him were dropped on 29 November 2011.

Following a trial before the County Court, Boljkovac was acquitted on 22 May 2014. “Not a single witness nor a single document indicated the guilt of Josip Boljkovac,” the judge said. His lawyer, Anto Nobilo, claimed that Boljkovac's trial, as well as the one of Josip Manolić, had been set up by former interior minister Tomislav Karamarko to secure his own election at the helm of HDZ. Boljkovac died later the same year.
