= David Vlajčić =

Croatian politician (born 1987)

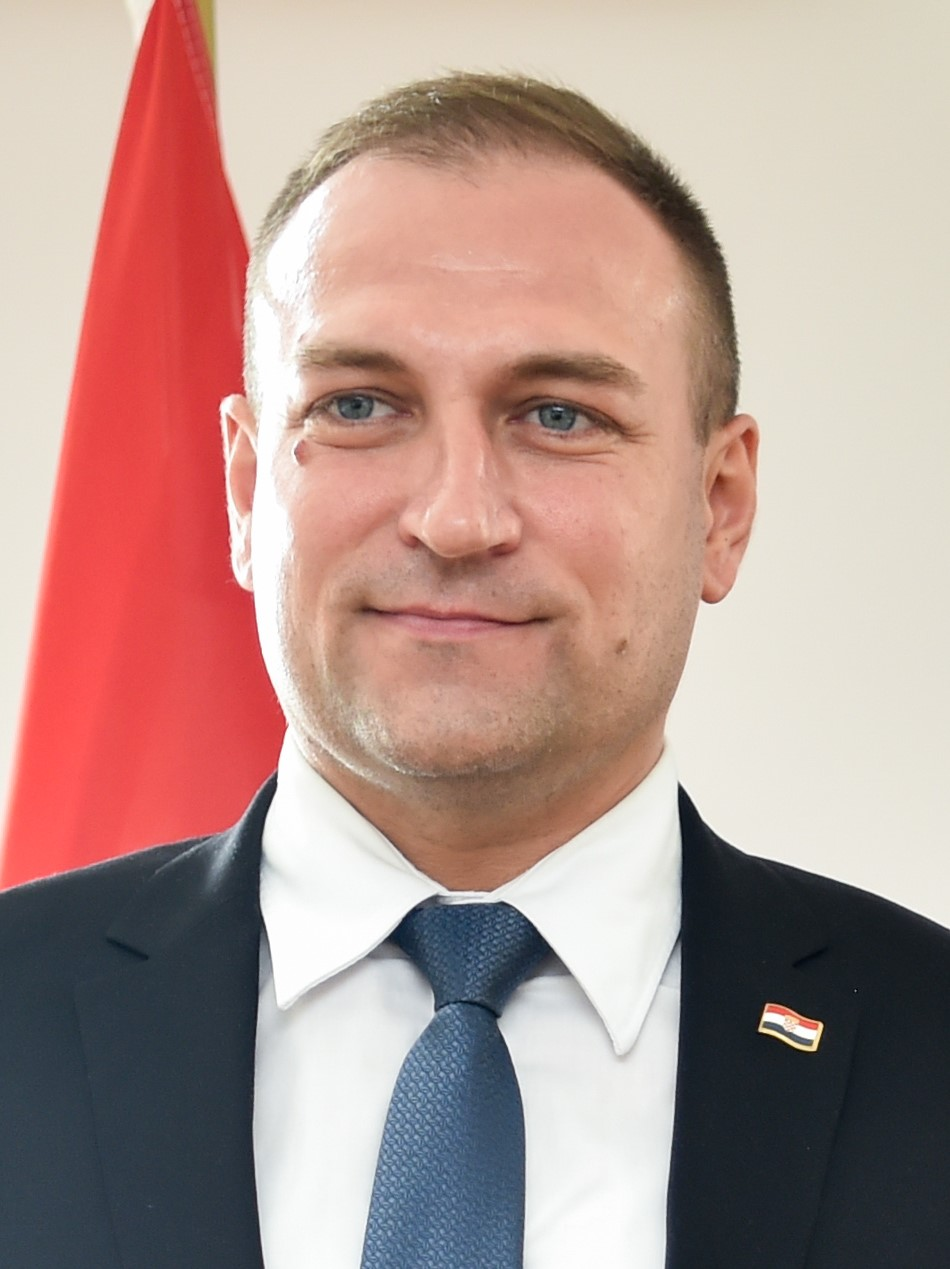
- Vlajčić in 2025

Deputy Prime Minister of Croatia
- Incumbent
- Assumed office 11 February 2025 Serving with Tomo Medved, Davor Božinović, Oleg Butković, Ivan Anušić, Branko Bačić and Tomislav Ćorić
- Prime Minister: Andrej Plenković
- Preceded by: Josip Dabro

Minister of Agriculture, Forestry and Fisheries
- Incumbent
- Assumed office 11 February 2025
- Prime Minister: Andrej Plenković
- Preceded by: Josip Dabro; Tugomir Majdak (acting)

Personal details
- Born: 1 July 1987 (age 39) Vukovar, SR Croatia, SFR Yugoslavia (modern Croatia)
- Party: Homeland Movement
- Other political affiliations: Croatian Democratic Union (until 2020)
- Spouse: Marina Vlajčić
- Children: 3
- Education: University of Osijek

David Vlajčić (born 1 July 1987) is a Croatian politician who has served as minister of agriculture, forestry and fisheries and deputy prime minister of Croatia since 2025. From 2024 to 2025, he served as state secretary of the Ministry of Construction, Spatial Planning and State Property. He was a member of the city council of Vukovar from 2017 to 2024, and served as deputy speaker from 2021 to 2024.
