= Deputy Prime Minister of Croatia =

Government official in Croatia

Vice President of the Government of Croatia
- Potpredsjednik Vlade Republike Hrvatske
- Coat of Arms of Croatia
- Incumbent; Davor Božinović, Tomo Medved, Oleg Butković, Branko Bačić, Ivan Anušić, David Vlajčić and Tomislav Ćorić since 19 July 2019, 23 July 2020, 15 July 2022, 17 January 2023, 16 November 2023, 11 February 2025 and 29 January 2026
- Appointer: Prime Minister of Croatia
- Term length: At the pleasure of the Prime Minister and the parliamentary majority
- Inaugural holder: Bernardo Jurlina, Mate Babić and Milan Ramljak
- Formation: 31 May 1990
- Website: www.vlada.hr

The deputy prime minister of Croatia (officially the Vice President of the Government of the Republic of Croatia, Croatian: Potpredsjednik Vlade Republike Hrvatske) is the official deputy of the Prime Minister of Croatia. Article 109 of the Constitution of Croatia states that the cabinet is to be made up of the Prime Minister, one or more deputy prime ministers and other cabinet ministers. According to convention, if the governing parliamentary majority is a coalition of parties, all junior partners in the coalition will usually be given one deputy prime minister in the cabinet, with their rank usually being determined by the number of MPs the party has in Parliament. The deputy prime ministers are permitted to simultaneously hold a ministerial portfolio while in office, but may also serve without holding such a portfolio.

The Deputy Prime Minister of Croatia is not the constitutional successor of the Prime Minister and will not automatically assume the post of Prime Minister in the event of a vacancy. However, the Deputy Prime Minister may chair cabinet meetings in the event of the Prime Minister becoming temporarily incapacitated or otherwise unable to chair the meetings of their government cabinet.

== History of the office ==
The office of the Deputy Prime Minister of Croatia was established on 31 May 1990, during the government of Stjepan Mesić. It was initially held by three people: Bernardo Jurlina, Mate Babić and Milan Ramljak. Since then 59 individuals have held the office, usually holding it simultaneously with several other people (e.g. currently there are 7 Deputy Prime Ministers). In addition, Deputy Prime Ministers may choose to combine their post with another government portfolio.

The current cabinet (in office since 17 May 2024) has seven Deputy Prime Ministers: Davor Božinović (since 2019), Tomo Medved (since 2020), Oleg Butković (since 2022), Branko Bačić (since 2023), Ivan Anušić (since 2024), David Vlajčić (since 2025) and Tomislav Ćorić (since 2026). They are all member of the Croatian Democratic Union, except Vlajčić, who is a member of the Homeland Movement.

== List of deputy prime ministers ==
Parties

Croatian Democratic Union (34)
Social Democratic Party (7)
Croatian People's Party – Liberal Democrats (4)
Croatian Social Liberal Party (3)
Croatian Peasant Party (2)
The Bridge (2)
Independent Democratic Serb Party (2)
Independent (2)
Homeland Movement (2)

Note

Denotes Deputy Prime Ministers who served as Prime Minister before or after holding the deputy prime ministership

=== Cabinet of Stjepan Mesić (1990) ===
Picture	Name (Birth–Death)	Term of Office		Political Party
	Bernardo Jurlina (1949–)	31 May 1990	24 August 1990	Croatian Democratic Union
	Mate Babić (1939–2017)	31 May 1990	24 August 1990	Croatian Democratic Union
	Milan Ramljak (1938–2018)	31 May 1990	24 August 1990	Croatian Democratic Union

=== Cabinet of Josip Manolić (1990–1991) ===
Picture	Name (Birth–Death)	Term of Office		Political Party
	Bernardo Jurlina (1949–)	24 August 1990	4 March 1991	Croatian Democratic Union
	Mate Babić (1939–2017)	24 August 1990	8 November 1990	Croatian Democratic Union
	Milan Ramljak (1938–2018)	24 August 1990	17 July 1991	Croatian Democratic Union
	Franjo Gregurić (1939–)	8 November 1990	17 July 1991	Croatian Democratic Union

=== Cabinet of Franjo Gregurić (1991–1992) ===
Picture	Name (Birth–Death)	Term of Office		Political Party
	Milan Ramljak (1938–2018)	17 July 1991	12 August 1992	Croatian Democratic Union
	Mate Granić (1947–)	31 July 1991	12 August 1992	Croatian Democratic Union
	Zdravko Tomac (1937–2020)	31 July 1991	26 June 1992	Social Democratic Party
	Jurica Pavelić (1947–)	15 November 1991	12 August 1992	Croatian Democratic Union

=== Cabinet of Hrvoje Šarinić (1992–1993) ===
Picture	Name (Birth–Death)	Term of Office		Political Party
	Mate Granić (1947–)	12 August 1992	3 April 1993	Croatian Democratic Union
	Vladimir Šeks (1943–)	12 August 1992	3 April 1993	Croatian Democratic Union
	Darko Čargonja (1965–)	12 August 1992	29 December 1992	Croatian Democratic Union
	Ivan Milas (1939–2011)	27 August 1992	3 April 1993	Croatian Democratic Union
	Mladen Vedriš (1950–)	29 December 1992	3 April 1993	Croatian Democratic Union

=== Cabinet of Nikica Valentić (1993–1995) ===
Picture	Name (Birth–Death)	Term of Office		Political Party
	Mate Granić (1947–)	3 April 1993	7 November 1995	Croatian Democratic Union
	Vladimir Šeks (1943–)	3 April 1993	20 September 1994	Croatian Democratic Union
	Borislav Škegro (1955–)	3 April 1993	7 November 1995	Croatian Democratic Union
	Ivica Kostović (1943–)	12 October 1993	7 November 1995	Croatian Democratic Union
	Jure Radić (1953–2016)	18 October 1994	7 November 1995	Croatian Democratic Union
	Bosiljko Mišetić (1945–)	11 May 1995	7 November 1995	Croatian Democratic Union

=== Cabinet of Zlatko Mateša (1995–2000) ===
Picture	Name (Birth–Death)	Term of Office		Political Party
	Mate Granić (1947–)	7 November 1995	27 January 2000	Croatian Democratic Union
	Borislav Škegro (1955–)	7 November 1995	27 January 2000	Croatian Democratic Union
	Ivica Kostović (1943–)	7 November 1995	14 October 1998	Croatian Democratic Union
	Jure Radić (1953–2016)	7 November 1995	27 January 2000	Croatian Democratic Union
	Ljerka Mintas-Hodak (1952–)	7 November 1995	27 January 2000	Croatian Democratic Union
	Milan Ramljak (1938–2018)	14 May 1998	13 April 1999	Croatian Democratic Union

=== First and Second cabinet of Ivica Račan (2000–2003) ===
Picture	Name (Birth–Death)	Term of Office		Political Party
	Goran Granić (1950–)	27 January 2000	21 March 2002	Croatian Social Liberal Party
	Željka Antunović (1955–)	27 January 2000	23 December 2003	Social Democratic Party
	Slavko Linić (1949–)	27 January 2000	23 December 2003	Social Democratic Party
	Dražen Budiša (1948–)	21 March 2002	30 July 2002	Croatian Social Liberal Party
	Goran Granić (1950–)	30 July 2002	23 December 2003	Croatian People's Party – Liberal Democrats
	Ante Simonić (1949–)	30 July 2002	23 December 2003	Croatian Peasant Party

=== First and Second cabinet of Ivo Sanader (2003–2009) ===
Picture	Name (Birth–Death)	Term of Office		Political Party
	Jadranka Kosor (1953–)	23 December 2003	6 July 2009	Croatian Democratic Union
	Andrija Hebrang (1946–)	23 December 2003	15 February 2005	Croatian Democratic Union
	Damir Polančec (1967–)	17 February 2005	6 July 2009	Croatian Democratic Union
	Đurđa Adlešič (1960–)	12 January 2008	6 July 2009	Croatian Social Liberal Party
	Slobodan Uzelac (1947–)	12 January 2008	6 July 2009	Independent Democratic Serb Party

=== Cabinet of Jadranka Kosor (2009–2011) ===
Picture	Name (Birth–Death)	Term of Office		Political Party
	Damir Polančec (1967–)	6 July 2009	30 October 2009	Croatian Democratic Union
	Đurđa Adlešič (1960–)	6 July 2009	12 October 2010	Croatian Social Liberal Party
	Slobodan Uzelac (1947–)	6 July 2009	23 December 2011	Independent Democratic Serb Party
	Božidar Pankretić (1964–)	6 July 2009	23 December 2011	Croatian Peasant Party
	Ivan Šuker (1957–2023)	19 November 2009	29 December 2010	Croatian Democratic Union
	Darko Milinović (1963–)	19 November 2009	23 December 2011	Croatian Democratic Union
	Domagoj Ivan Milošević (1970–)	29 December 2010	23 December 2011	Croatian Democratic Union
	Petar Čobanković (1957–)	29 December 2010	23 December 2011	Croatian Democratic Union
	Gordan Jandroković (1967–)	29 December 2010	23 December 2011	Croatian Democratic Union

=== Cabinet of Zoran Milanović (2011–2016) ===
Picture	Name (Birth–Death)	Term of Office		Political Party
	Radimir Čačić (1949–)	23 December 2011	14 November 2012	Croatian People's Party – Liberal Democrats
	Neven Mimica (1953–)	23 December 2011	1 July 2013	Social Democratic Party
	Branko Grčić (1964–)	23 December 2011	22 January 2016	Social Democratic Party
	Milanka Opačić (1968–)	23 December 2011	22 January 2016	Social Democratic Party
	Vesna Pusić (1953–)	16 November 2012	22 January 2016	Croatian People's Party – Liberal Democrats
	Ranko Ostojić (1962–)	15 July 2013	22 January 2016	Social Democratic Party

=== Cabinet of Tihomir Orešković (2016) ===
Picture	Name (Birth–Death)	Term of Office		Political Party
	Tomislav Karamarko (1959–)	22 January 2016	15 June 2016	Croatian Democratic Union
	Božo Petrov (1979–)	22 January 2016	19 October 2016	Bridge of Independent Lists

=== First, second and third cabinet of Andrej Plenković (2016–present) ===
Picture	Name (Birth–Death)	Term of Office		Political Party
	Ivan Kovačić (1974–)	19 October 2016	28 April 2017	Bridge of Independent Lists
	Davor Ivo Stier (1959–)	19 October 2016	19 June 2017	Croatian Democratic Union
	Damir Krstičević (1969–)	19 October 2016	8 May 2020	Croatian Democratic Union
	Martina Dalić (1967–)	19 October 2016	14 May 2018	Croatian Democratic Union
	Predrag Štromar (1969–)	9 June 2017	23 July 2020	Croatian People's Party-Liberal Democrats
	Marija Pejčinović Burić (1963–)	19 June 2017	19 July 2019	Croatian Democratic Union
	Tomislav Tolušić (1979–)	25 May 2018	17 July 2019	Croatian Democratic Union
	Zdravko Marić (1977–)	19 July 2019	5 July 2022	Independent
	Davor Božinović (1961–)	19 July 2019	Incumbent	Croatian Democratic Union
	Tomo Medved (1968–)	23 July 2020	Incumbent	Croatian Democratic Union
	Boris Milošević (1974–)	23 July 2020	29 April 2022	Independent Democratic Serb Party
	Anja Šimpraga (1987–)	29 April 2022	17 May 2024	Independent Democratic Serb Party
	Oleg Butković (1979–)	15 July 2022	Incumbent	Croatian Democratic Union
	Branko Bačić (1959–)	17 January 2023	Incumbent	Croatian Democratic Union
	Ivan Anušić (1973–)	16 November 2023	Incumbent	Croatian Democratic Union
	Josip Dabro (1983–)	17 May 2024	18 January 2025	Homeland Movement
	Marko Primorac (1984–)	17 May 2024	29 January 2026	Independent
	David Vlajčić (1987–)	11 February 2025	Incumbent	Homeland Movement
	Tomislav Ćorić (1979-)	29 January 2026	Incumbent	Croatian Democratic Union

== See also ==
- List of cabinets of Croatia
