= Branko Bačić =

Croatian politician (born 1959)

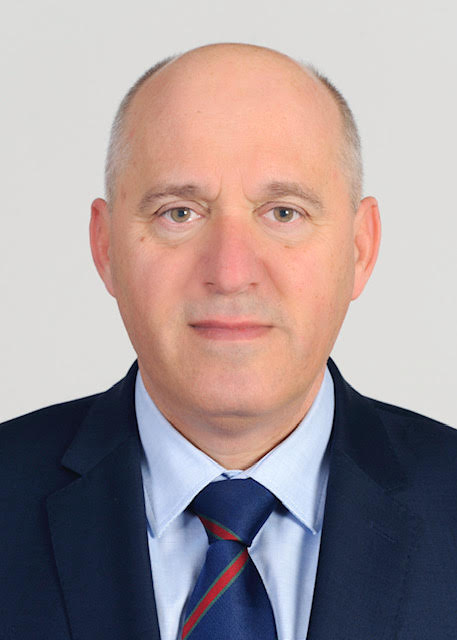
- Bačić in 2019

Deputy Prime Minister of Croatia
- Incumbent
- Assumed office 17 January 2023 Serving with Tomo Medved, Davor Božinović, Oleg Butković, Ivan Anušić, David Vlajčić and Tomislav Ćorić
- Prime Minister: Andrej Plenković

Minister of Construction, Spatial Planning and State Property
- Incumbent
- Assumed office 17 January 2023
- Prime Minister: Andrej Plenković
- Preceded by: Ivan Paladina

Minister of Environment Protection, Spatial Planning and Construction
- In office 29 October 2010 – 23 December 2011
- Prime Minister: Jadranka Kosor
- Preceded by: Marina Matulović-Dropulić
- Succeeded by: Ivan Vrdoljak

Mayor of Blato
- In office 1993 – 5 January 2004

Personal details
- Born: 7 June 1959 (age 67) Dubrovnik, PR Croatia, FPR Yugoslavia (modern Croatia)
- Party: Croatian Democratic Union (1990–present)
- Spouse: Željka Bačić
- Children: 2
- Education: University of Zagreb

Branko Bačić (born 7 June 1959) is a Croatian politician and graduate engineer in geodesy. He is the current minister of construction, spatial planning and state property, and deputy prime minister of Croatia, positions he has held since 2023.

He is also the vice-president of the Croatian Democratic Union. He previously served as mayor of the municipality of Blato from 1993 to 2004, and minister of environment protection, spatial planning and construction from 2010 to 2011.

== Early life ==
Bačić was born in Dubrovnik on 7 June 1959. He graduated from the Faculty of Geodesy of the University of Zagreb in 1982. From 1982 to 1993, he worked in the Directorate for Cadastre and Geodetic Affairs and was its director. As a Croatian veteran, he participated in the Croatian War of Independence in 1991 and 1992 on the Southern Front. From 1993 to 2004, he was elected mayor of the municipality of Blato on the island of Korčula three times.

== Political career ==
In the 2003 parliamentary elections, Bačić was elected as a member of the Croatian Parliament. Shortly thereafter, on 5 January 2004, he was appointed State Secretary in the Ministry of the Sea, Tourism, Transport and Development, as a result of which his mandate as a member of the Croatian Parliament was put on hold, and his mandate as mayor of Blato municipality also ended. As state secretary, he held the position of head of the Expert Working Group at the Ministry of the Sea, Tourism, Transport and Development for negotiations with the Expert Working Group of Bosnia and Herzegovina for the purpose of solving the problem of a harmless passage under the future Pelješac Bridge, and thus determining the essential elements of the bridge. He signed the agreement with Bosnia and Herzegovina on 7 December 2006, in Sarajevo. In that mandate, together with his colleagues, he initiated and implemented numerous projects and infrastructure investments on the Croatian coast, and he mostly advocated for a better quality of life for the islanders. During his term as secretary of state, vignettes for island vehicles, night lines to the larger islands, the mark of quality and authenticity for Croatian island products, subsidization of island employers, and numerous other transport, communal and social infrastructure projects were introduced.

In the 2007 parliamentary elections, Bačić was elected as a member of the Croatian Parliament. On 12 January 2008, he was again appointed State Secretary in the Ministry of the Sea, Transport and Infrastructure. In 2010, he briefly returned to the Croatian Parliament, and shortly after the reconstruction of the Croatian Government, he was appointed Minister of Environment Protection, Spatial Planning and Construction. During his tenure as minister, in 2011 he proposed, and the Croatian Parliament adopted, the Law on Subsidization and State Guarantee of Housing Loans, which law is still the most attractive model of buying apartments for young people (so-called 'Bačić apartments'). At the same time and in that mandate, he initiated and created, and the Croatian Parliament adopted, the Law on Dealing with Illegally Constructed Buildings, which, in addition to the conditions prescribed by law, enabled the legalization of illegal buildings built until 21 June 2011. From 2008 to 2011, he held the position of president of the International Sava River Basin Commission. The goal of establishing the Sava Commission is the sustainable management of the waters of the basin, as well as the rehabilitation of the waterway to Sisak.

In the 2011 parliamentary elections, Bačić was re-elected as a member of the Croatian Parliament as the holder of the candidate list of the Croatian Democratic Union in electoral district X. In that mandate, he held the position of chairman of the Committee for Environmental Protection in the Croatian Parliament.

In the 2015 parliamentary elections, Bačić was elected as a member of the Croatian Parliament for the fourth time, and in that short term he held the position of vice president of the Committee for Spatial Planning and Construction.

In the extraordinary 2016 parliamentary elections, Bačić was elected as a member of the Croatian Parliament for the fifth time. After the constitution of the parliament, he was elected president of the Club of HDZ representatives in the Croatian Parliament.

In the 2020 parliamentary elections, Bačić was elected as a member of the Croatian Parliament for the sixth time. After the constitution of the parliament, he was re-elected as the president of the Club of HDZ representatives.

On 17 January 2023, Bačić was elected Deputy Prime Minister and Minister of Construction, Spatial Planning and State Property.

Since 2005, Bačić has been elected five times as a councillor in the County Assembly of Dubrovnik-Neretva County, and in 2009 and 2013 he was the holder of the candidate list of the Croatian Democratic Union for the county assembly. Due to his obligations to the government and parliament, he put his council mandates in the county assembly on hold.

Bačić has been a member of the Croatian Democratic Union since 1990. On three occasions, he was elected president of the County Board of the Croatian Democratic Union of Dubrovnik-Neretva County. Since 2008, he has been a member of the presidency of the Croatian Democratic Union, and he held the position of General Secretary of the Croatian Democratic Union from 2009 to 2012.

In the internal party elections, held on 15 March 2020, according to the principle of one member - one vote, Bačić was elected vice president of the Croatian Democratic Union.

== Personal life ==
Bačić is married to Željka Bačić and is the father of two daughters, Marica and Ana. He actively speaks English. He is the founder of the Friends' Society "Wine in the Tradition of Living".
