= Cabinet of Josip Manolić =

Croatian government (1990–1991)

Manolić Cabinet
- 2nd Cabinet of the Republic of Croatia

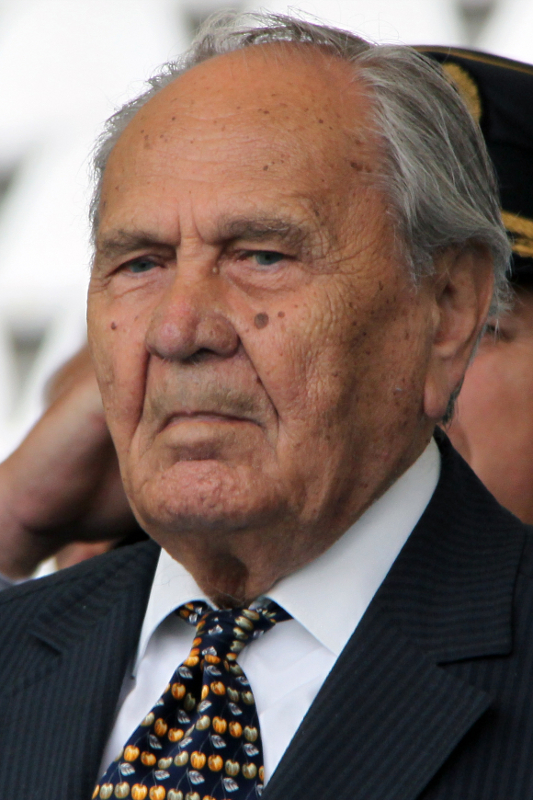
- Date formed: 24 August 1990
- Date dissolved: 17 July 1991

People and organisations
- Head of state: Franjo Tuđman
- Head of government: Josip Manolić
- Deputy head of government: Bernardo Jurlina; Mate Babić; Milan Ramljak; Franjo Gregurić
- No. of ministers: 21 (on 17 July 1991)
- Ministers removed: 12
- Total no. of members: 33 (including former members)
- Member parties: Croatian Democratic Union (HDZ)
- Status in legislature: Single-party majority
- Opposition party: League of Communists of Croatia-Party of Democratic Changes
- Opposition leader: Ivica Račan

History
- Election: 1990 election
- Legislature term: 1990–1992
- Predecessor: Cabinet of Stjepan Mesić
- Successor: Cabinet of Franjo Gregurić

The Second Government of the Republic of Croatia (Croatian: Druga Vlada Republike Hrvatske) was the Croatian Government cabinet led by Prime Minister Josip Manolić. It was announced on 24 August 1990, when the previous prime minister, Stjepan Mesić, left Zagreb to assume the Croatian seat at the Yugoslav collective presidency following armed insurrection by ethnic Serbs. During the cabinet's duration Croatia declared its independence from Yugoslavia on 25 June 1991. It was the 2nd cabinet of modern Croatia since the first multi-party elections, formed by the Croatian Democratic Union, and was reconstructed on 17 July 1991 in favor of a national unity government in response to the escalation of the Croatian War of Independence.

== List of ministers and portfolios ==
The periods in the table fall outside the cabinet's term when the minister listed served in the preceding or the subsequent cabinets.

Name	Party	Portfolio	Period
Josip Manolić	HDZ	Prime Minister	24 August 1990 – 17 July 1991
Franjo Gregurić	HDZ	Deputy Prime Minister	8 November 1990 – 17 July 1991
Mate Babić	HDZ	Deputy Prime Minister	31 May – 8 November 1990
Milan Ramljak	HDZ	Deputy Prime Minister	31 May 1990 – 12 August 1992
Stjepan Zdunić	HDZ	Minister of Social Planning	31 May – 10 October 1990
Božo Udovičić	HDZ	Minister of Energy and Industry	31 May 1990 – 17 July 1991
Marijan Hanžeković	HDZ	Minister of Finance	25 July 1990 – 17 July 1991
Milan Hrnjak	HDZ	Minister of Construction, Housing-Communal Works, and Protection of Human Environment	31 May 1990 – 4 March 1991
Milovan Šibl	HDZ	Minister of Information	31 May 1990 – 4 March 1991
Hrvoje Hitrec	HDZ	Minister of Information	4 March 1991 – 17 July 1991
Zdravko Mršić	Independent	Minister of Foreign Affairs	31 May – 8 November 1990
Frane Vinko Golem	HDZ	Minister of Foreign Affairs	8 November 1990 – 5 March 1991
Davorin Rudolf	HDZ	Minister of Foreign Affairs	5 March – 17 July 1991
Davorin Rudolf	HDZ	Minister of Maritime Affairs	3 May 1991 – 17 July 1991
Martin Špegelj	HDZ	Minister of Defence	24 August 1990 – 2 July 1991
Šime Đodan	HDZ	Minister of Defence	2 – 17 July 1991
Ivan Tarnaj	HDZ	Minister of Agriculture, Forestry and Water Resources	31 May 1990 – 12 August 1992
Branko Babac	HDZ	Minister of Justice and Administration	28 June 1990 – 17 July 1991
Josip Božičević	HDZ	Minister of Transportation	25 July 1990 – 12 August 1992
Vlatko Pavletić	HDZ	Minister of Education, Culture and Sports	31 May 1990 – 15 April 1992
Marin Črnja	HDZ	Minister of Labour, Veterans and Disabled Issues	31 May 1990 – 4 March 1991
Bernardo Jurlina	HDZ	Minister of Labour, Social Welfare and Family	4 March 1991 – 15 April 1992
Bernardo Jurlina	HDZ	Deputy Prime Minister	31 May 1990 – 17 July 1991
Petar Kriste	HDZ	Minister of Commercial Exchange	24 August 1990 – 15 April 1992
Janko Vranyczany-Dobrinović	HDZ	Minister of Tourism	25 July 1990 – 17 July 1991
Josip Boljkovac	HDZ	Minister of the Interior	31 May 1990 – 2 July 1991
Onesin Cvitan	HDZ	Minister of the Interior	2 – 17 July 1991
Branko Bergman	HDZ	Minister of Water Resources	25 July 1990 – 17 July 1991
Andrija Hebrang	HDZ	Minister of Health	30 May 1990 – 12 August 1992
Osman Muftić	HDZ	Minister of Science, Technology and Informatics	30 May 1990 – 31 July 1991
Zvonimir Medvedović	HDZ	Minister without portfolio	24 August – 4 October 1990
Dragutin Kalogjera	HDZ	Minister without portfolio	31 May – 4 October 1990
Gojko Šušak	HDZ	Minister without portfolio	31 May 1990 – 17 July 1991
Zdravko Mršić	Independent	Minister without portfolio	31 May 1990 – 17 July 1991
Vjenceslav Cvitan		Government secretary	30 May 1990 – 30 June 1991
