= Ministry of Agriculture, Forestry and Fisheries (Croatia) =

Ministry of the Croatian government

Ministry of Agriculture, Forestry and Fisheries Ministarstvo poljoprivrede, šumarstva i ribarstva
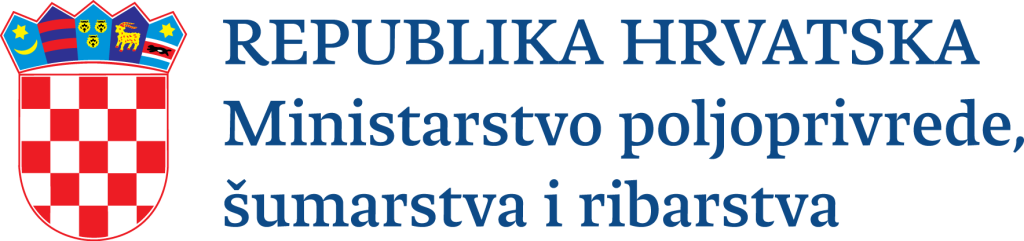

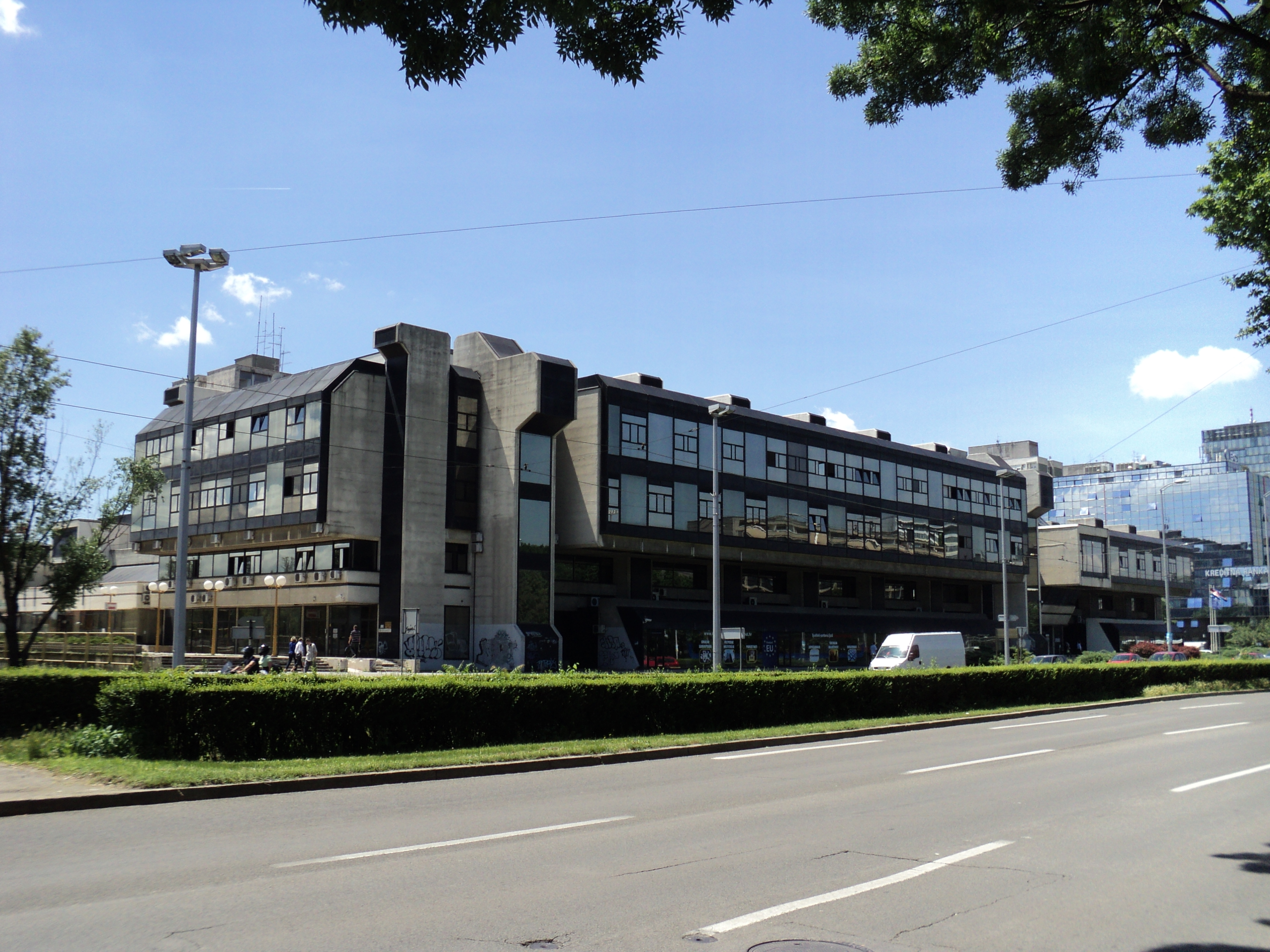
- Headquarters at Ulica grada Vukovara 78

Ministry overview
- Formed: 31 May 1990; 36 years ago
- Type: Ministry in the Government of Croatia
- Jurisdiction: Croatia
- Headquarters: Ulica grada Vukovara 78, Zagreb, Croatia
- Employees: 984 (2025 estimate)
- Budget: €1.54 billion (2025 budget)
- Website: poljoprivreda.gov.hr

Minister
- Currently: David Vlajčić since 11 February 2025

The Ministry of Agriculture, Forestry and Fisheries of the Republic of Croatia (Croatian: Ministarstvo poljoprivrede, šumarstva i ribarstva) is a ministry of the Croatian government, whose work is aimed at overseeing the development of agriculture and fisheries in Croatia.

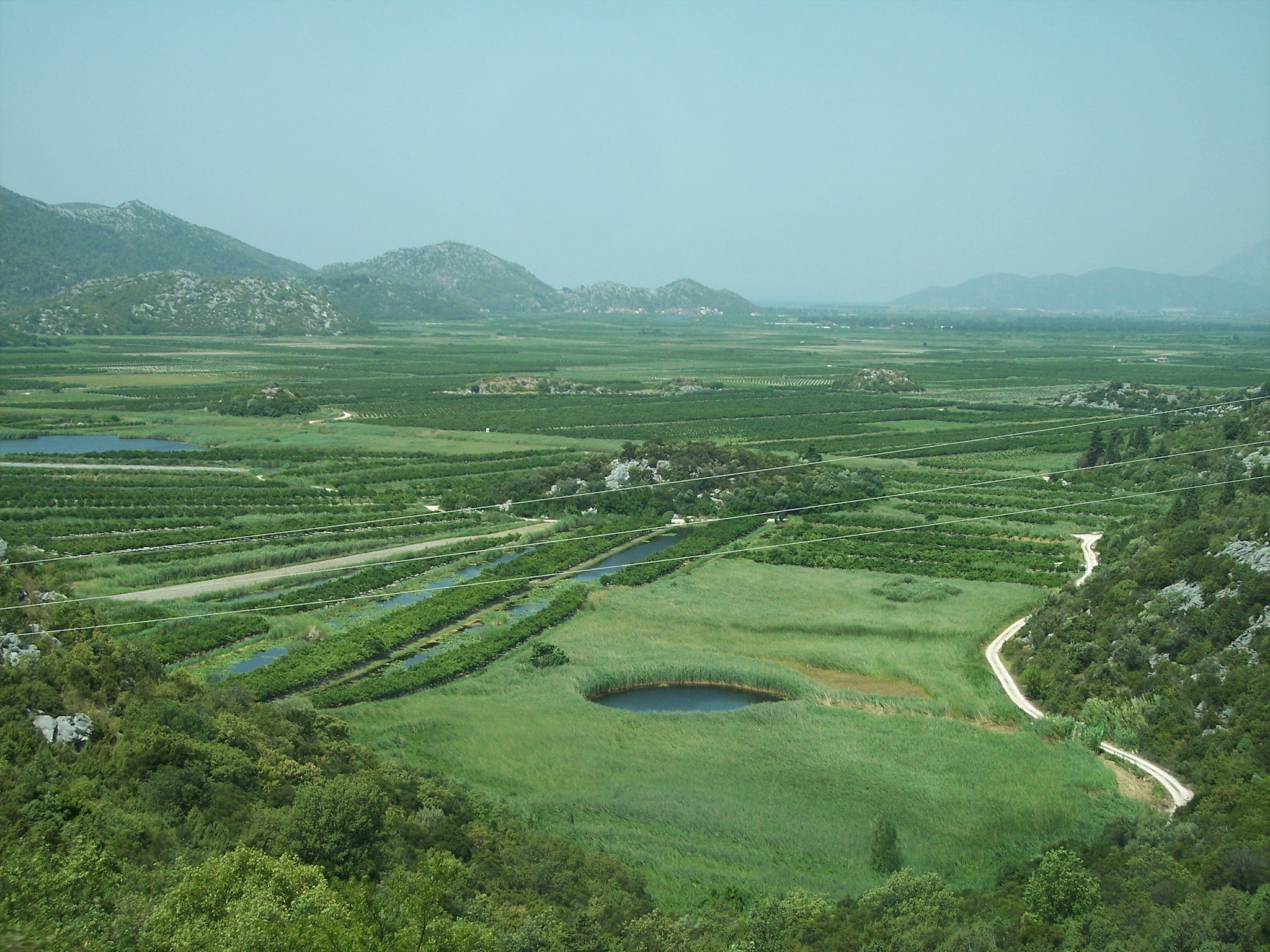
Although most of the Croatian agricultural output is made in the fertile lowlands of Slavonia, the Neretva Delta in Dalmatia makes a major contribution in some sectors.

== List of ministers ==
Minister	Party	Term start	Term end	Days in office
Ivan Tarnaj ^{[nb 1]}	HDZ	31 May 1990	12 August 1992	804
Ivan Majdak ^{[nb 2]}	HDZ	12 August 1992	3 April 1993	234
Ivan Tarnaj ^{[nb 1]} (2nd term)	HDZ	3 April 1993	31 December 1994	637
Ivica Gaži ^{[nb 2]}	HDZ	27 January 1995	7 November 1995	284
Matej Janković ^{[nb 2]}	HDZ	7 November 1995	16 December 1996	405
Zlatko Dominiković ^{[nb 2]}	HDZ	16 December 1996	22 February 1999	798
Ivan Đurkić ^{[nb 2]}	HDZ	22 February 1999	27 January 2000	339
Božidar Pankretić ^{[nb 2]}	HSS	27 January 2000	23 December 2003	1,426
Petar Čobanković ^{[nb 1]}	HDZ	23 December 2003	12 January 2008	1,481
Božidar Pankretić ^{[nb 3]} (2nd term)	HSS	12 January 2008	6 July 2009	541
Petar Čobanković ^{[nb 3]} (2nd term)	HDZ	6 July 2009	23 December 2011	900
Tihomir Jakovina	SDP	23 December 2011	22 January 2016	1,491
Davor Romić	Ind.	22 January 2016	19 October 2016	271
Tomislav Tolušić	HDZ	19 October 2016	17 July 2019	1,001
Marija Vučković	HDZ	22 July 2019	17 May 2024	1,761
Josip Dabro	DP	17 May 2024	18 January 2025	246
David Vlajčić	DP	11 February 2025	Incumbent	539

=== Notes ===
nb 1. Served as Minister of Agriculture, Forestry and Waterworks
nb 2. Served as Minister of Agriculture, Forestry
nb 3. Served as Minister of Agriculture, Fisheries and Rural Development

== See also ==
- Economy of Croatia
- Croatian cuisine
