= Ivan Anušić =

Croatian politician (born 1973)

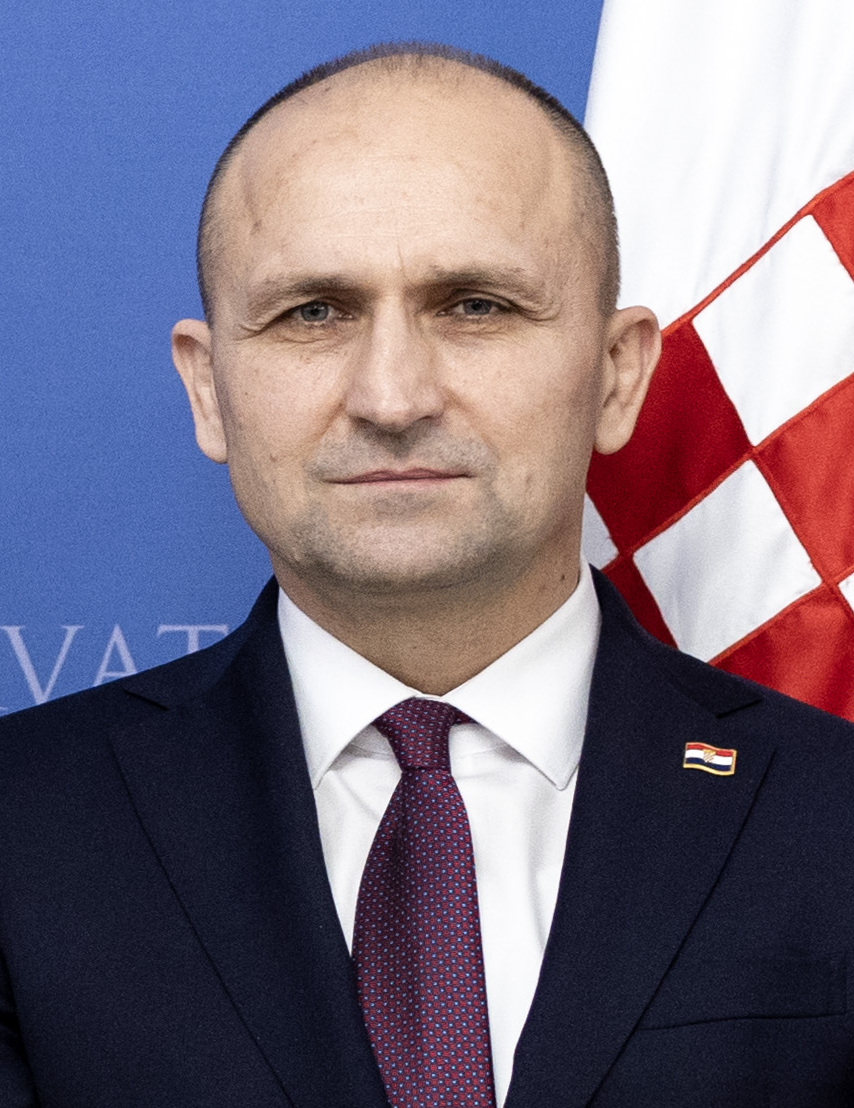
- Anušić in 2024

Deputy Prime Minister of Croatia
- Incumbent
- Assumed office 16 November 2023 Serving with Tomo Medved, Davor Božinović, Oleg Butković, Branko Bačić, David Vlajčić and Tomislav Ćorić
- Prime Minister: Andrej Plenković

Minister of Defence
- Incumbent
- Assumed office 16 November 2023
- Prime Minister: Andrej Plenković
- Preceded by: Mario Banožić

Prefect of Osijek-Baranja County
- In office 4 June 2017 – 15 November 2023
- Preceded by: Vladimir Šišljagić
- Succeeded by: Mato Lukić

Member of the Croatian Parliament
- In office 28 December 2015 – 9 June 2017
- Succeeded by: Domagoj Mikulić
- Constituency: IV electoral district

Mayor of Antunovac
- In office 15 May 2005 – 3 June 2017
- Succeeded by: Davor Tubanjski

Personal details
- Born: 13 October 1973 (age 53) Osijek, SR Croatia, SFR Yugoslavia (modern Croatia)
- Party: Croatian Democratic Union (2011–present)
- Other political affiliations: Croatian Party of Rights (1993–2009); Independent (2009–2011)
- Spouse: Mandica Anušić
- Children: 4
- Education: University of Zagreb

Ivan Anušić (born 13 October 1973) is a Croatian politician serving as Deputy Prime Minister and Minister of Defence since November 2023. A member of the Croatian Democratic Union (HDZ), he previously served as governor of the Osijek-Baranja County from 2017 to 2023.

Anušić also served as a member of the Croatian Parliament between 2015 and 2020, and was the mayor of Antunovac from 2005 to 2017 as well. Originally, he became a member of the Croatian Party of Rights in 1993, but was not politically active in the 1990s. He was politically independent between 2009 and 2011, before joining the HDZ.
