= Ministry of Environmental Protection and Green Transition (Croatia) =

Ministry of the Croatian government

Ministry of Environmental Protection and Green Transition Ministarstvo zaštite okoliša i zelene tranzicije
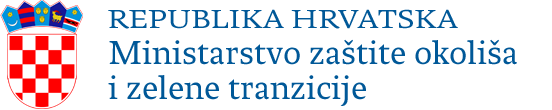

Ministry overview
- Formed: 31 May 1990; 36 years ago
- Type: Ministry in the Government of Croatia
- Jurisdiction: Croatia
- Headquarters: Radnička cesta 80, Zagreb, Croatia
- Employees: 415 (2025 estimate)
- Budget: €732.4 million (2026 budget)
- Website: mzozt.gov.hr

Minister
- Currently: Marija Vučković since 17 May 2024

The Ministry of Environmental Protection and Green Transition of the Republic of Croatia (Croatian: Ministarstvo zaštite okoliša i zelene tranzicije) is the ministry in the Government of Croatia which is in charge of environmental protection.

Throughout its history, the ministry has existed at times, and at other times its duties have been transferred to the Ministry of Construction, Spatial Planning and State Property. It has previously been known as the Ministry of Environment and Energy and the Ministry of Environmental Protection and Physical Planning.

The government agencies in the jurisdiction of the Ministry are:

- Climate Transition Administration (Croatian: Uprava za klimatsku tranziciju)
- Environmental Impact Assessment and Sustainable Waste Management Administration (Croatian: Uprava za procjenu utjecaja na okoliš i održivo gospodarenje otpadom)
- Water Management and Marine Protection Administration (Croatian: Uprava vodnoga gospodarstva i zaštite mora)
- Nature Protection Administration (Croatian: Uprava za zaštitu prirode)
- EU Projects, European and International Cooperation Administration (Croatian: Uprava za EU projekte, europsku i međunarodnu suradnju)
- Institute for Environmental and Nature Protection (Croatian: Zavod za zaštitu okoliša i prirode)

== List of ministers ==
Minister	Party	Term start	Term end	Days in office
Božo Kovačević ^{[nb 1]}	HSLS	27 January 2000	18 July 2003	1,268
Ivo Banac ^{[nb 1]}	LS	18 July 2003	23 December 2003	158
Mirela Holy	SDP	23 December 2011	7 June 2012	167
Hrvoje Dokoza (acting)	SDP	7 June 2012	13 June 2012	6
Mihael Zmajlović	SDP	13 June 2012	22 January 2016	1,318
Slaven Dobrović ^{[nb 2]}	Most	22 January 2016	27 April 2017	462
Marijo Šiljeg (acting)	HDZ	28 April 2017	9 June 2017	42
Tomislav Ćorić	HDZ	9 June 2017	23 July 2020	1,140
Marija Vučković	HDZ	17 May 2024	Incumbent	826

=== Notes ===
nb 1. Served as Minister of Environmental Protection and Physical Planning

nb 2. Served as Minister of Environmental and Nature Protection from 22 January until 19 October 2016

== See also ==
- Ministry of Construction and Spatial Planning (Croatia)
