= Margareta Mađerić =

Croatian politician

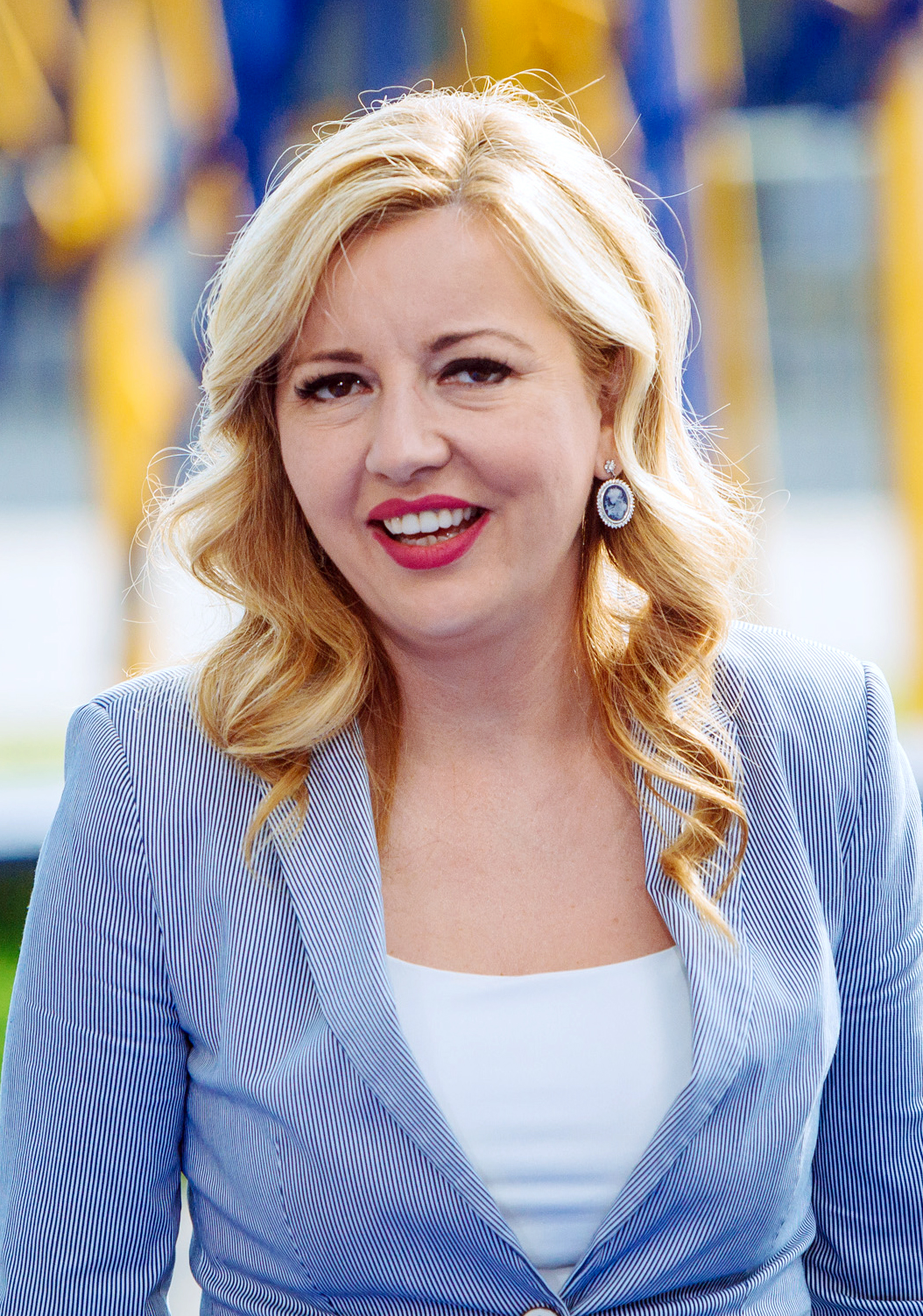
- Mađerić in 2017

State Secretary in the Ministry of Labour and Pension System, Family and Social Policy
- Incumbent
- Assumed office 22 December 2016
- Minister: Nada Murganić; Vesna Bedeković; Josip Aladrović; Marin Piletić

Member of the Croatian Parliament
- In office 28 December 2015 – 14 October 2016
- Prime Minister: Zoran Milanović; Tihomir Orešković
- Constituency: 1st constituency

Councilor in the Zagreb Assembly
- In office 14 June 2005 – 30 December 2016
- Mayor: Milan Bandić

Personal details
- Born: 2 July 1977 (age 49) Zagreb, SR Croatia, SFR Yugoslavia
- Party: Croatian Democratic Union
- Spouse: Luka Mađerić
- Children: 2

Margareta Mađerić (born 2 July 1977) is a Croatian politician who has served as a state secretary in the Ministry of Labour and Pension System, Family and Social Policy since 2016. A member of the Croatian Democratic Union, she served as a representative in the Croatian Parliament from 2015 to 2016 and as a councilor in the Zagreb Assembly from 2005 to 2013. Prior to her political career, she was a marketing and communications manager.

== Early life and education ==
Mađerić was born on July 2, 1977 in Zagreb. She graduated from the Zagreb School of Business, having majored in marketing and communications management.

== Political career ==
Mađerić entered politics in 1997 at age 15 as an activist for the HDZ Youth. She served as president of the HDZ Youth from 2002 to 2007, which due to its position internally within the party, also made her one of the internal presidents of the Croatian Democratic Union.

=== Member of the Zagreb City Assembly ===
In 2005, Mađerić was elected to the Zagreb Assembly, where she served three terms. Between 2010 and 2013, she was the leader of the HDZ group within the Assembly. According to 2012 Assembly statistics, Mađerić was the second-most active member of the Assembly after Morana Paliković Gruden (HNS). In addition to her duties in the Zagreb Assembly, Mađerić remained a local HDZ political organizer, and the president of the Katarina Zrinska Women's Association. Her third term as councilor ended on December 30, 2016 and she was replaced by Kazimir Ilijaš who served the rest of her term.

In the 2013 Zagreb local elections, she ran as the HDZ candidate for mayor but won only 5.41% of the vote.

=== Member of Parliament ===
In the 2015 Croatian parliamentary election, Mađerić ran as a candidate for the Patriotic Coalition, led by the HDZ, and won a seat from the 1st Constituency. During her term she served as Chairperson of the Credentials and Privileges Commission and as member of the Interparliamentary Co-operation Committee, Gender Equality Committee and the Delegation to the Parliamentary Assembly of the Organization for Security and Co-operation in Europe.

=== State Secretary ===
She was appointed State Secretary in what was then called the Ministry of Demographics, Family, Youth and Social Policy on December 22, 2016. In the fifteenth Government of Croatia the ministry was merged with the Ministry of Labour and Pension System becoming the Ministry of Labour and Pension System, Family and Social Policy.

== Personal life ==
She is married to Luka Mađerić and the couple has two children.
