= Electoral district V (Croatian Parliament) =

- Constituency for the Croatian Parliament
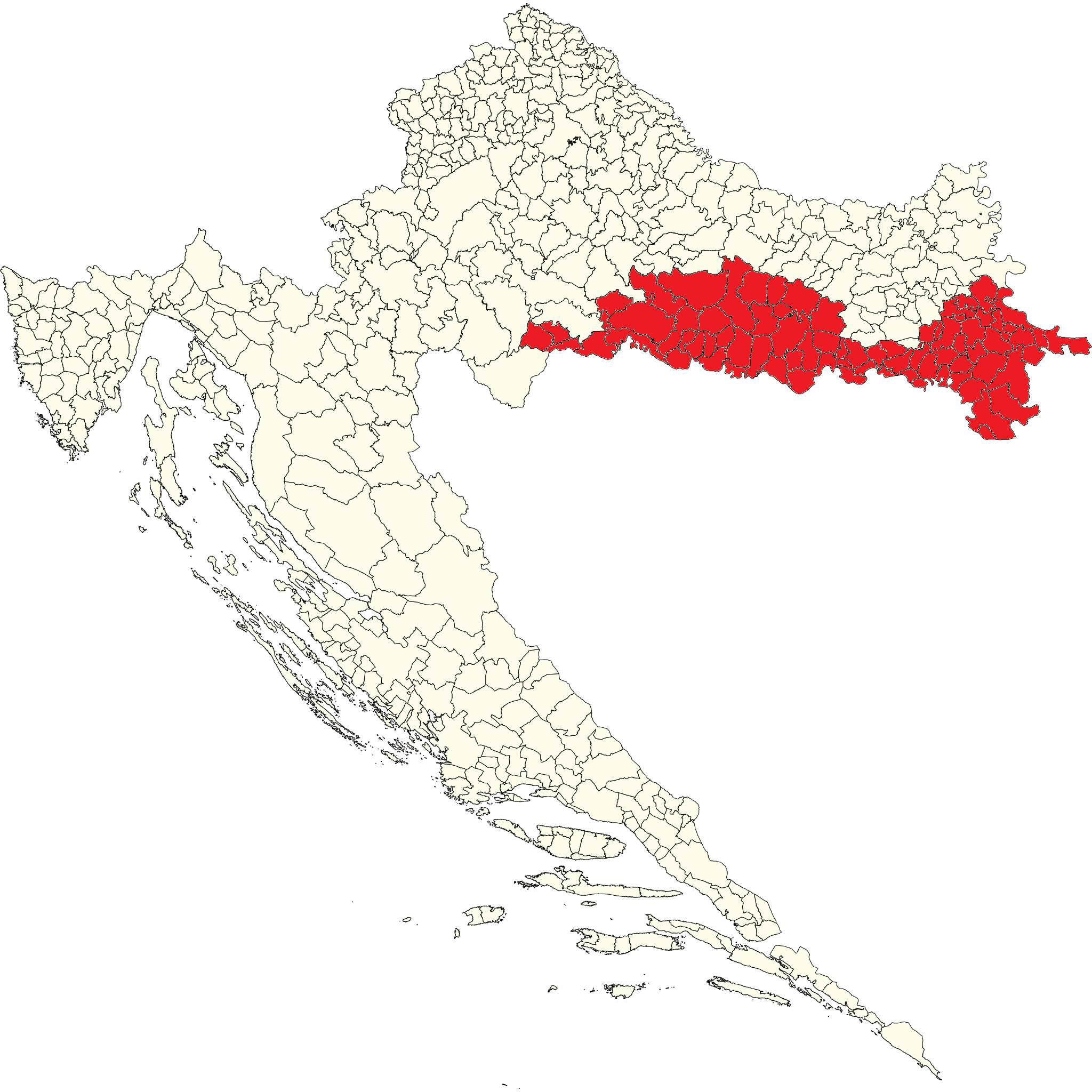
- Map of Electoral district V (2023-present)
- Electorate: 350,489 (2025)
- Major settlements: Slavonski Brod, Vinkovci, Vukovar, Požega, Nova Gradiška, Novska

Current constituency
- Created: 2023
- Number of members: 14

Electoral district V (Croatian: V. izborna jedinica) is one of twelve electoral districts of the Croatian Parliament. In 2025, the district had 350,489 registered voters.

== Boundaries ==
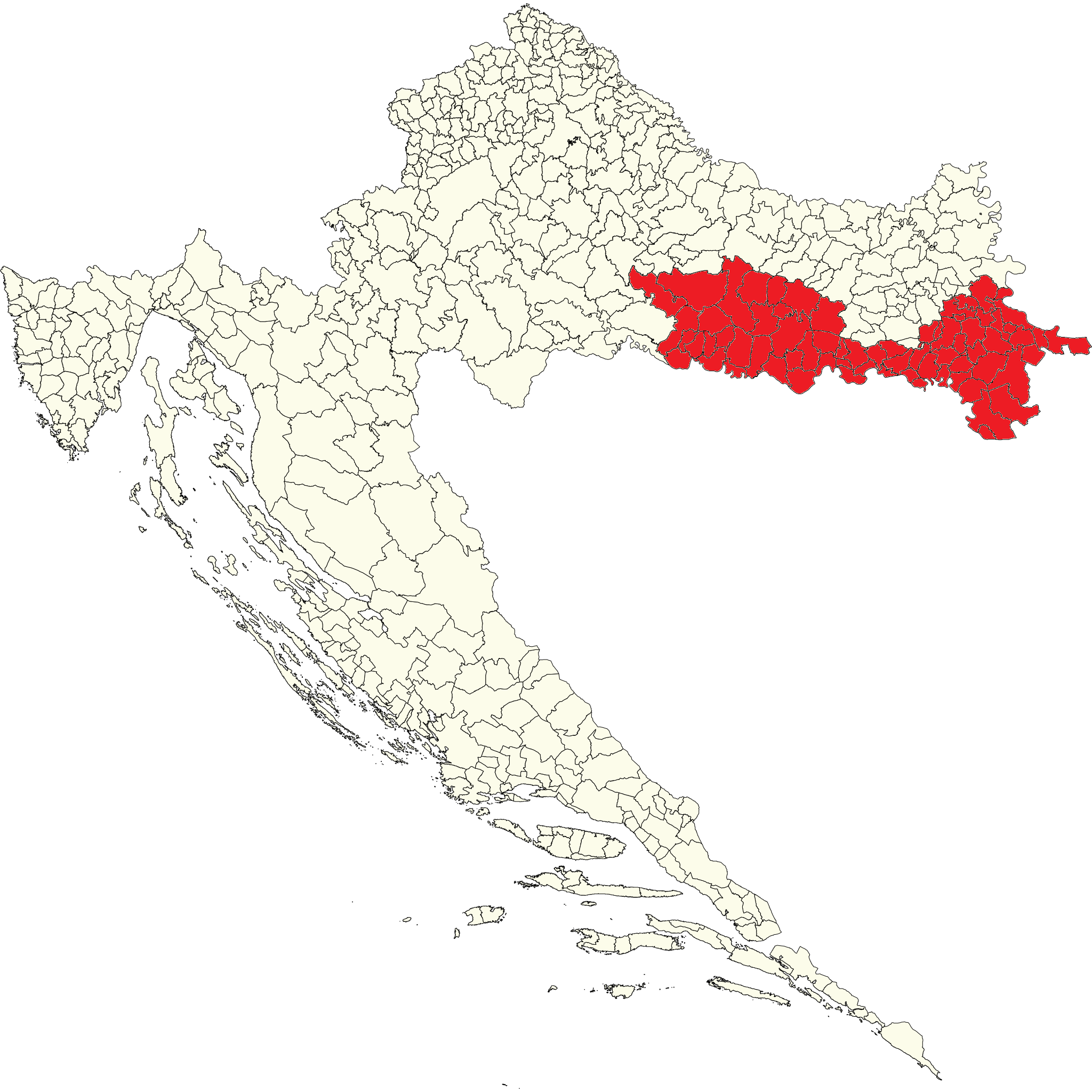
Electoral district V (1999-2023)

=== Creation ===
Electoral district V consisted of:

- The whole Požega-Slavonia County;
- The whole Brod-Posavina County;
- The whole Vukovar-Srijem County.

=== 2023 revision ===
Under the 2023 revision, district boundaries were redrawn according to the suggestion of the Constitutional Court to compel a proportional number of voters.

The new district consists of:

- The whole Vukovar-Srijem County
- The whole Brod-Posavina County
- The whole Požega-Slavonia County
- The eastern part of Sisak-Moslavina County:
  - cities and municipalities: Hrvatska Kostajnica, Novska, Donji Kukuruzari, Hrvatska Dubica, Jasenovac, Lipovljani and Majur

== Representatives ==
The current representatives of the fifth electoral district in the Croatian Parliament are:

Name	Party	Deputizing
Anamarija Blažević	HDZ	Antonija Jozić
Pero Ćosić	HDZ	
Željko Glavić	HDZ	
Sanda Livia Maduna	HDZ	Danijel Marušić
Nikola Mažar	HDZ	
Petar Šimić	HDZ	Marin Piletić
Josip Dabro	DP	
Dubravka Lipovac Pehar	DP	
Ivan Penava	DP	
Mario Milinković	SDP	
Ivana Ribarić Majanović	SDP	Marko Krička
Martina Vlašić Iljkić	SDP	
Martin Kordić	HS	Marijan Pavliček
Tomislav Zadro	Independent	Ivan Bosančić

== Elections ==
=== 2000 Elections ===
Party	Votes	%	Seats
HDZ	82.872	30.75	5
SDP - HSLS	71.780	26.63	5
HSS - LS - HNS	51.342	19.05	3
HSP - HKDU	17.207	6.38	1
others	46.299	17.19	0
Total	269.500	100	14
Valid votes	269.500	97.94	
Invalid/blank votes	5.672	2.06	
Total votes	275.172	72.20	
Registered voters/turnout	381.150		
Source: Results Archived 2022-11-20 at the Wayback Machine

HDZ

- Vesna Škare-Ožbolt
- Jadranka Kosor
- Josip Sesar
- Juraj Njavro
- Marija Bajt

SDP - HSLS

- Mato Arlović
- Želimir Janjić
- Branislav Tušek
- Dubravka Horvat
- Marko Baričević

HSS - LS - HNS

- Ivo Lončar
- Ljubica Lalić
- Marijan Maršić

HSP - HKDU

- Anto Kovačević

=== 2003 Elections ===
Party	Votes	%	Seats	+/-
HDZ	88.247	41.17	8	+3
SDP	31.659	14.77	3	-1
HSS	19.726	9.20	1	-1
HSP	14.183	6.62	1	0
HSLS - DC	10.769	5.02	1	0
others	49.743	23.22	0	-1
Total	214.327	100	14	0
Valid votes	214.327	97.24		
Invalid/blank votes	6.094	2.76		
Total votes	220.421	61.19		
Registered voters/turnout	360.242			
Source: Results Archived 2022-11-20 at the Wayback Machine

HDZ

- Petar Čobanković
- Anto Bagarić
- Zdravko Sočković
- Tomislav Čuljak
- Marija Bajt
- Drago Prgomet
- Petar Mlinarić
- Ivica Klem

SDP

- Mato Arlović
- Mato Gavran
- Ljubica Brdarić

HSS

- Ljubica Lalić

HSP

- Vlado Jukić

HSLS - DC

- Vesna Škare-Ožbolt

=== 2007 Elections ===
Party	Votes	%	Seats	+/-
HDZ	90.821	42.75	8	0
SDP	56.721	26.70	4	+1
HDSSB	12.757	6.01	1	+1
HSS - HSLS	11.766	5.54	1	-1
HSP	11.023	5.19	0	-1
others	29.343	13.81	0	0
Total	212.431	100	14	0
Valid votes	212.431	8.38		
Invalid/blank votes	3.506	1.62		
Total votes	215.937	58.02		
Registered voters/turnout	372.163			
Source: Results

HDZ

- Petar Čobanković
- Suzana Bilić Vardić
- Franjo Lucić
- Tomislav Čuljak
- Mato Bilonjić
- Petar Mlinarić
- Davor Huška
- Božo Galić

SDP

- Igor Dragovan
- Zdravko Ronko
- Sonja Šimunović
- Goran Heffer

HDSSB

- Boro Grubišić

HSS - HSLS

- Zdravko Kelić

=== 2011 Elections ===
Party	Votes	%	Seats	+/-
HDZ	69.929	32.93	6	-2
SDP - HNS - IDS - HSU	68.447	32.23	6	+2
HDSSB	24.308	11.45	2	+1
others	49.687	23.39	0	-1
Total	212.371	100	14	0
Valid votes	212.371	98.32		
Invalid/blank votes	3.625	1.68		
Total votes	215.996	58.75		
Registered voters/turnout	367.654			
Source: Results Archived 2022-11-20 at the Wayback Machine

HDZ

- Jadranka Kosor
- Petar Čobanković
- Danijel Marušić
- Franjo Lucić
- Tomislav Čuljak
- Zvonko Milas

SDP - HNS - IDS - HSU

- Igor Dragovan
- Zdravko Ronko
- Željko Sabo
- Josip Vuković
- Ivan Vrdoljak
- Tihomir Jakovina

HDSSB

- Boro Grubišić
- Dražen Đurović

=== 2015 Elections ===
Party	Votes	%	Seats	+/-
HDZ - HSS - HSP AS - BUZ - HSLS - HRAST - HDS - ZDS	88.760	46.05	8	+2
SDP - HNS - HSU - HL SR - A-HSS - ZS	49.268	25.56	4	-2
Most	22.069	11.45	2	+2
others	32.641	16.94	0	-2
Total	192.738	100	14	0
Valid votes	192.738	97.93		
Invalid/blank votes	4.066	2.07		
Total votes	196.804	59.66		
Registered voters/turnout	329.855			
Source: Results Archived 2022-11-20 at the Wayback Machine

HDZ - HSS - HSP AS - BUZ - HSLS - HRAST - HDS - ZDS

- Božo Galić
- Stevo Culej
- Danijel Marušić
- Pero Ćosić
- Franjo Lucić
- Tomislav Čuljak
- Marija Budimir
- Pero Ćorić

SDP - HNS - HSU - HL SR - A-HSS - ZS

- Predrag Matić
- Zdravko Ronko
- Tihomir Jakovina
- Marija Ilić

Most

- Tomislav Panenić
- Ivica Mišić

=== 2016 Elections ===
Party	Votes	%	Seats	+/-
HDZ	77.278	47.11	8	0
SDP - HNS - HSS - HSU	41.382	25.22	4	0
Most	15.591	9.50	1	-1
ŽZ - PH - AM	8.962	5.46	1	+1
others	20.816	12.71	0	0
Total	164.029	100	14	0
Valid votes	164.029	97.84		
Invalid/blank votes	3.613	2.16		
Total votes	167.642	51.66		
Registered voters/turnout	324.523			
Source: Results Archived 2022-11-20 at the Wayback Machine

HDZ

- Zdravko Marić
- Stevo Culej
- Dražen Milinković
- Franjo Lucić
- Pero Ćosić
- Ivan Penava
- Danijel Marušić
- Mladen Karlić

SDP - HNS - HSU - HL SR - A-HSS - ZS

- Zdravko Ronko
- Predrag Matić
- Davor Vlaović
- Marta Luc-Polanc

Most

- Tomislav Panenić

ŽZ - PH - AM

- Ivica Mišić

=== 2020 Elections ===
Party	Votes	%	Seats	+/-
HDZ	67.345	47.81	8	0
DP - HS - BLOK - HKS - HRAST - SU - ZL	27.878	19.79	3	+3
SDP - HSS - HSU - SNAGA - GLAS - IDS - PGS	27.079	19.22	3	-1
Most	8.145	5.78	0	-1
others	10.385	7.40	0	-1
Total	140.832	100	14	0
Valid votes	140.832	97.42		
Invalid/blank votes	3.728	2.58		
Total votes	144.560	42.86		
Registered voters/turnout	337.321			
Source: Results

HDZ

- Zdravko Marić
- Mario Banožić
- Josip Aladrović
- Pero Ćosić
- Marijana Balić
- Mladen Karlić
- Darko Puljašić
- Danijel Marušić

DP - HS - BLOK - HKS - HRAST - SU - ZL

- Ivan Penava
- Marijan Pavliček
- Ružica Vukovac

SDP - HSS - HSU - SNAGA - GLAS - IDS - PGS

- Predrag Fred Matić
- Vinko Grgić
- Marina Opačak Bilić

=== 2024 Elections ===
Party	Votes	%	Seats	+/-
HDZ - HSLS - HDS - HNS - HSU	75.807	42.78	7	-1
SDP - Centar - HSS - DO i SIP - NS R - GLAS	34.679	19.57	3	0
DP - PiP	30.816	19.57	3	0
Most - HS - HKS - NLM	15.035	8.48	1	+1
others	20.853	9.60	0	0
Total	177.190	100	14	0
Valid votes	177.190	96.55		
Invalid/blank votes	6.330	3.45		
Total votes	183.520	54.51		
Registered voters/turnout	336.652			
Source: Results

HDZ - HSLS - HDS - HNS - HSU

- Marin Piletić
- Ivan Bosančić
- Pero Ćosić
- Antonija Jozić
- Nikola Mažar
- Danijel Marušić
- Željko Glavić

SDP - Centar - HSS - DO i SIP - NS R - GLAS

- Predrag Fred Matić
- Martina Vlašić Iljkić
- Mario Milinković

DP - PiP

- Ivan Penava
- Josip Dabro
- Dubravka Lipovac Pehar

Most - HS - HKS - NLM

- Marijan Pavliček
