= Margetić =

Margetić is a surname. Notable people with the surname include:

- Anja Margetić (born 1975), Bosnian politician and former swimmer
- Lujo Margetić (1920–2010), Croatian legal historian
