= Dabro =

Dabro is a Croatian surname. Notable people with the surname include:

- Ante Dabro (born 1938), Australian sculptor of Croatian origin
- Josip Dabro (born 1983), Croatian politician
- Marko Dabro (born 1997), Croatian footballer
