= Anja Margetić =

Bosnian politician and swimmer (born 1975)

Deputy Mayor of Sarajevo
- In office 8 April 2021 – 17 July 2025
- Mayor: Benjamina Karić; Predrag Puharić

Personal details
- Born: 29 July 1975 (age 50) Sarajevo, SR Bosnia and Herzegovina, SFR Yugoslavia
- Party: Our Party
- Sports career
- Sport: Swimming
- Strokes: Butterfly

Anja Margetić (born 29 July 1975) is a Bosnian politician and former swimmer. She competed in two events at the 1992 Summer Olympics, being the first woman to represent Bosnia and Herzegovina at the Olympics. She later entered politics, serving as the deputy mayor of Sarajevo from 2021 to 2025 as a member of Our Party.

== Biography ==
Margetić was born on 29 July 1975, in Sarajevo, Yugoslavia. She comes from a Croat family and her father worked as a cameraman. She received her primary and secondary education in Sarajevo. She was active as a swimmer, being a member of the national team for SFR Yugoslavia and setting several Bosnian records. She participated at the Balkaniad and the European Championships.

In 1991, Margetić moved to the U.S. on a swimming scholarship, attending Sam Barlow High School in Oregon. As a senior in 1992, she broke the Mount Hood Conference records in the 100m butterfly and 100m freestyle. She later began attending the University of Nebraska–Lincoln on a swimming scholarship and was regarded as the school's top female butterfly swimmer.

In 1992, Margetić was invited by the Olympic Committee of the Republic of Bosnia and Herzegovina to compete at the 1992 Summer Olympics, the first time Bosnia competed at the games. Selected to compete in the 100m and 200m butterfly events, she became one of the first four women to represent Bosnia and Herzegovina at the Olympics. She turned 17 on the day of her first race and finished 44th in the 100m and 27th in the 200m. The following year, she was selected to compete at the 1993 Mediterranean Games, but refused after learning she would have been designated an "Independent Mediterranean Participant", due to Bosnia not yet being a part of the International Swimming Federation.

Margetić returned to Sarajevo in 1997, after completing her studies at Nebraska. She began working at the Central Bank of Bosnia and Herzegovina and later served 23 years there in the role of SWIFT administrator and head of the Transaction Monitoring Service. In 2007, she received a master's degree in international business and public policy from the Italian University of Catania. She also served as a swimming coach, with several state champions and national team members having competed under her.

In April 2021, Margetić, a member of Our Party, was elected one of two deputy mayors of Sarajevo. She announced she was leaving the country in November 2024, declaring she had been unjustly overlooked in selection for acting mayor of Sarajevo and that the Troika alliance had "betrayed the people".
