= Samir Avdić =

Mayor of Sarajevo since 2025

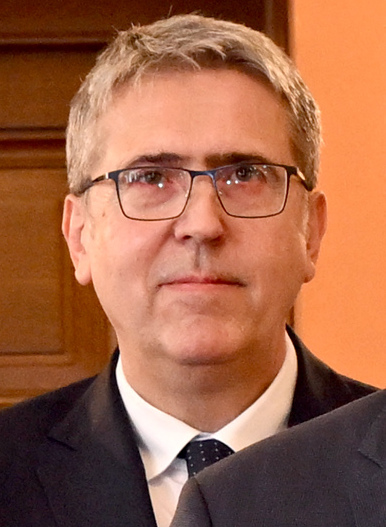
- Avdić in 2025

41st Mayor of Sarajevo
- Incumbent
- Assumed office 16 July 2025
- Preceded by: Predrag Puharić
Additional positions
Deputy Mayor of Sarajevo
In office 26 July 2023 – 18 November 2024
Mayor	Benjamina Karić

Personal details
- Born: 21 March 1967 (age 59) Sarajevo, SR Bosnia and Herzegovina, SFR Yugoslavia
- Party: People and Justice (2018–present)
- Other political affiliations: Party of Democratic Action (2012–2018)
- Children: 2
- Education: University of Sarajevo (BSSM, MSSM)
- Basketball career

Personal information
- Listed height: 2.05 m (6 ft 9 in)

Career information
- Playing career: 1985–2003
- Position: Shooting guard

Career history
- 1985–1993: Bosna
- 1993–1994: Unicaja Málaga
- 1995–1997: Tofaş
- 1998–1999: Tuborg İzmir
- 2002–2003: Bosna
Medals
Men's basketball
Representing Yugoslavia
U19 World Cup
Gold medal – first place	1987 Italy	Under-19

Samir Avdić (born 21 March 1967) is a Bosnian politician and former professional basketball player serving as the 41st mayor of Sarajevo since July 2025. He previously served as deputy mayor of Sarajevo from 2023 to 2024. A member of the People and Justice party, Avdić was also Minister of Culture and Sports of Sarajevo Canton from 2021 to 2023.

During his professional basketball career, Avdić played as a shooting guard, representing both Yugoslavia and later the Bosnia and Herzegovina men's national team, which he also captained. He is one of the all-time leading scorers of the Bosnian national team.

== Early life and education ==
Avdić was born in Sarajevo, SFR Yugoslavia, present-day Bosnia and Herzegovina on 21 March 1967. He holds a bachelor's and master's degree in sport management from the University of Sarajevo.

== Basketball career ==
Avdić came through the youth system of former European champions Bosna, where he began his professional career. He later played abroad in Spain for Unicaja Málaga and in Turkey for Tofaş and Tuborg İzmir. He was a pivotal member of the Bosnia and Herzegovina men's national team, and played at the EuroBasket 1993, 1997 and 1999. Bosnia and Herzegovina managed to reach the quarter-finals of the 1993 edition.

Avdić represented Yugoslavia at youth levels, winning Balkan, European and World Championships, including the 1987 FIBA Under-19 World Championship. After the independence of Bosnia and Herzegovina, he became captain of the country's national basketball team.

Following retirement, Avdić served as sporting director of the Bosnian national team.

== Political career ==
Avdić entered into politics after getting elected to the Novo Sarajevo Municipal Assembly in the 2012 municipal elections as a member of the Party of Democratic Action (SDA). He then left the SDA and joined People and Justice (NiP) in 2018, and served as Minister of Culture and Sports of Sarajevo Canton from January 2021 to March 2023. He was appointed deputy mayor of Sarajevo in July 2023, serving until November 2024.

In November 2024, the Social Democratic Party nominated Predrag Puharić for the office of mayor of Sarajevo following his predecessor Benjamina Karić getting elected municipal mayor of Novo Sarajevo a month prior in the 2024 municipal elections. The Sarajevo City Council appointed him as mayor on 29 November until the formation of a new City Council and the appointment of a new mayor. Following lengthy coalition negotiations, NiP nominated Avdić, who was eventually elected mayor by the City Council on 16 July 2025. Upon his appointment, Avdić stated that he did not perceive his "mandate as a political function, but rather as a call to serve the citizens of Sarajevo."

== Personal life ==
Avdić is married and has two sons. Apart from Bosnian, he also speaks English, Spanish and Turkish.

Political offices
Preceded by Predrag Puharić	Mayor of Sarajevo; 2025–present	Incumbent
