= Vesna Bedeković =

Croatian politician

Vesna Bedeković MP

Minister of Demographics, Family, Youth and Social Policy
- In office 22 July 2019 – 22 July 2020
- Prime Minister: Andrej Plenković
- Preceded by: Nada Murganić
- Succeeded by: Josip Aladrović (Minister of Labour and Pension System, Family and Social Policy)

Member of the Croatian Parliament
- Incumbent
- Assumed office 22 July 2020
- Constituency: IV electoral district
- In office 14 October 2016 – 19 July 2019
- Preceded by: Tomislav Tolušić
- Constituency: IV electoral district

Personal details
- Born: 22 February 1966 (age 60) Bjelovar, SR Croatia, SFR Yugoslavia
- Party: Croatian Democratic Union
- Children: 2
- Education: University of Josip Juraj Strossmayer; University of Zagreb

Vesna Bedeković (born 22 February 1966) is a Croatian pedagog and politician who served as the Minister of Demographics, Family, Youth and Social Policy from July 2019 to July 2020 in the cabinet of Andrej Plenković.

== Early life and education ==
Born on 22 February 1966 in Bjelovar, Bedeković attended elementary school in Pitomača, and secondary school in Virovitica. She graduated from the Faculty of Pedagogy at the University of Josip Juraj Strossmayer in Osijek, and from the Department of Pedagogy at the Faculty of Humanities and Social Sciences at the University of Zagreb.

== Pedagogical career ==
Bedeković began her career at the Kloštar Podravski Primary School, the Petar Preradović Primary School in Pitomača and the Central School Stjepan Sulimanac in Pitomača, in the period between 1987 and 2006. From 2005 to 2009, he served as Head of the Administrative Department for Education, Culture, Sports and Technical Culture and Head of the Department of Social Activities of the Virovitica-Podravina County. At the same time, she was teaching at the Faculty of Teacher Education and Faculty of Philosophy at the University of Josip Juraj Strossmayer in Osijek and at the Faculty of Philosophy at the University of Zagreb.

From 2007 to 2009, Bedeković has served as a temporary dean, and from 23 March 2009 to 13 October 2016, she was a Dean of the High School of Management in Tourism and Informatics in Virovitica. She left the dean's office when joined the Parliament in October 2016.

Bedeković is a member of the Croatian Pedagogical Society and International Association for Intercultural Education (IAIE) and has worked, inter alia, on scientific projects linking interculturality and minority language education and access to Roma integration as well as the development of creativity in lifelong education of teachers.

== Political career ==
From 14 October 2016 to 19 July 2019, Bedeković was a member of the Croatian Parliament, replacing former Minister of Agriculture Tomislav Tolušić on the spot of deputy MP and thus entered the Croatian legislative body even though she won only 0.83 percent of the votes in the elections, convincingly least at HDZ list. In the Parliament, she was a member of the Gender Equality Committee, and after Andro Krstulović Opara took the mayor's office in Split, she took over the chairmanship of the Parliamentary Committee on Education, Science and Culture.

== Personal life ==
Bedeković is married and has two daughters.

== See also ==
- Cabinet of Andrej Plenković I

Political offices
Preceded by Nada Murganić	Minister of Demographics, Family, Youth and Social Policy; 2019–2020	Succeeded by Josip Aladrović (Minister of Labour and Pension System, Family and Social Policy)
