= Ministry of Regional Development and EU Funds (Croatia) =

Ministry of the Croatian government

Ministry of Regional Development and EU Funds Ministarstvo regionalnoga razvoja i fondova Europske unije
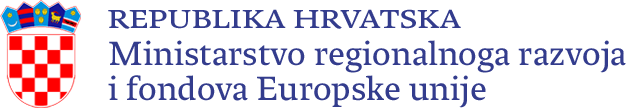

Ministry overview
- Formed: 22 December 2011; 14 years ago
- Type: Ministry in the Government of Croatia
- Jurisdiction: Croatia
- Headquarters: Miramarska cesta 22, Zagreb, Croatia
- Employees: 524 (2025 estimate)
- Budget: €1.18 billion (2025 budget)
- Website: razvoj.gov.hr

Minister
- Currently: Nataša Mikuš Žigman since 15 July 2025

The Ministry of Regional Development and EU Funds of the Republic of Croatia (Croatian: Ministarstvo regionalnoga razvoja i fondova Europske unije) is the ministry in the Government of Croatia which is in charge of planning and implementation of regional development policies, activities related to harmonization with the European Union in the field of regional policy and the use of funds from the European Union.

== List of ministers ==
Minister	Party	Term start	Term end	Days in office
Petar Čobanković ^{[nb 1]}	HDZ	12 January 2008	6 July 2009	541
Božidar Pankretić ^{[nb 1]}	HSS	6 July 2009	23 December 2011	900
Branko Grčić	SDP	23 December 2011	22 January 2016	1,491
Tomislav Tolušić	HDZ	22 January 2016	19 October 2016	271
Gabrijela Žalac	HDZ	19 October 2016	17 July 2019	1,001
Marko Pavić	HDZ	22 July 2019	23 July 2020	367
Nataša Tramišak	HDZ	23 July 2020	17 January 2023	908
Šime Erlić	HDZ	17 January 2023	15 July 2025	910
Nataša Mikuš Žigman	HDZ	15 July 2025	incumbent	385

=== Notes ===
nb 1. Served as Minister of Regional Development, Forestry and Water Management
