= Gabrijela Žalac =

Croatian politician (born 1979)

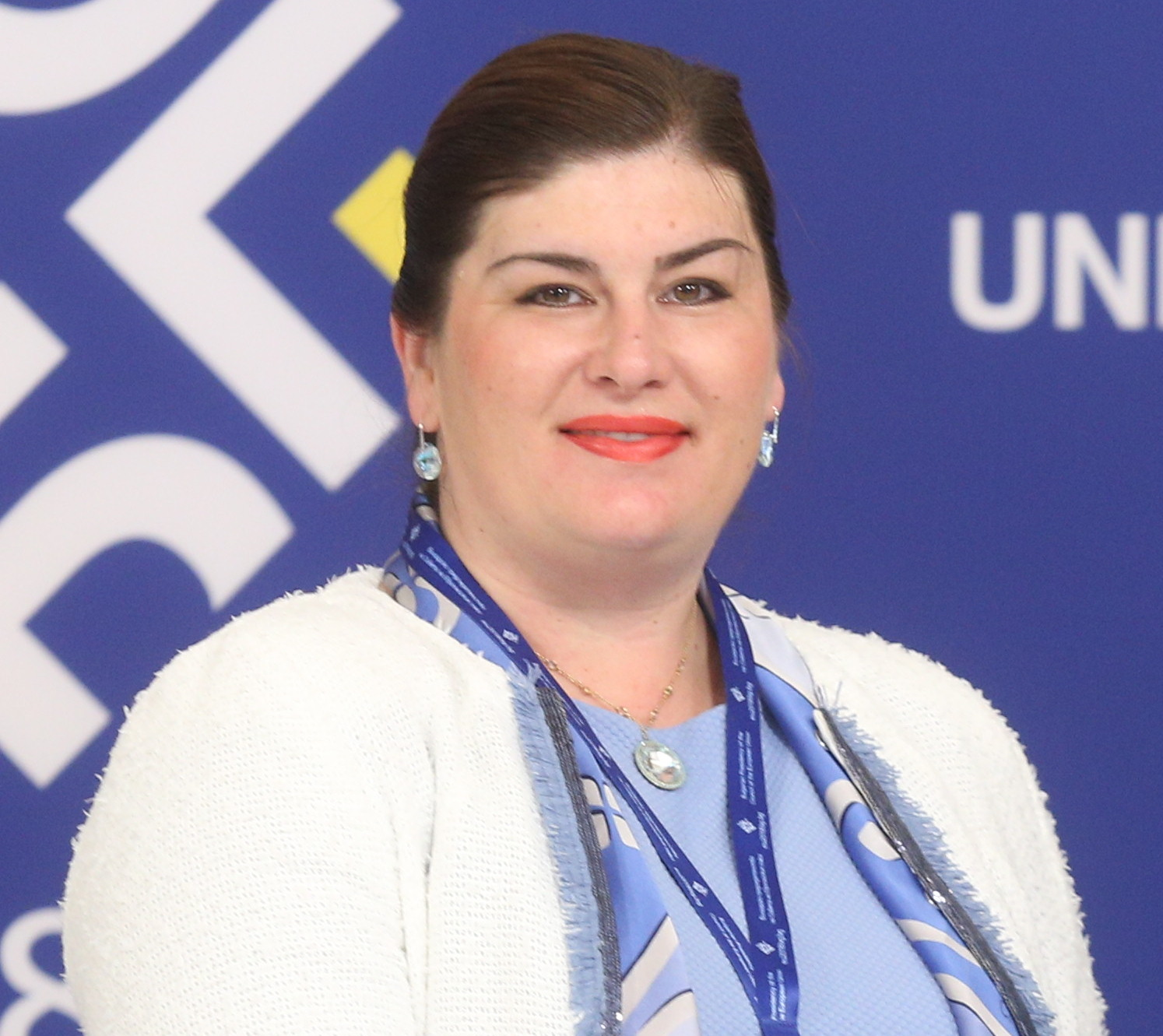
- Žalac in 2018

Minister of Regional Development and EU Funds
- In office 19 October 2016 – 17 July 2019
- Prime Minister: Andrej Plenković
- Preceded by: Tomislav Tolušić
- Succeeded by: Marko Pavić

Personal details
- Born: 4 February 1979 (age 47) Vinkovci, SR Croatia, SFR Yugoslavia
- Party: Croatian Democratic Union
- Education: University of Osijek

Gabrijela Žalac (born 4 February 1979) is a Croatian politician. She served as Minister of Regional Development and EU Funds from 2016 to 2019.

== Early life and education ==
Žalac was born on 4 February 1979 in Vinkovci. She graduated in economics at the University of Osijek where she also completed postgraduate studies in management.

== Career ==
For more than ten years, Žalac worked on the development and implementation of projects, including using European funds. She served as director of the department of foreign and European affairs of the Vukovar-Srijem County administration and president of the regional development agency "Hrast". In October 2016, on the recommendation of the Croatian Democratic Union, she was appointed Minister of Regional Development and Management of European Funds in the government of Andrej Plenković. She held this position until July 2019.

== Controversies ==
In 2019, Žalac hit a nine-year-old child in Vinkovci while driving with an invalid license. She was fined 500 Croatian kuna. The child was seriously injured.

In 2021, Žalac was arrested by the European Attorney General's Office for corruption and embezzling funds and was investigated in 2023.
