= Nada Šikić =

Croatian politician

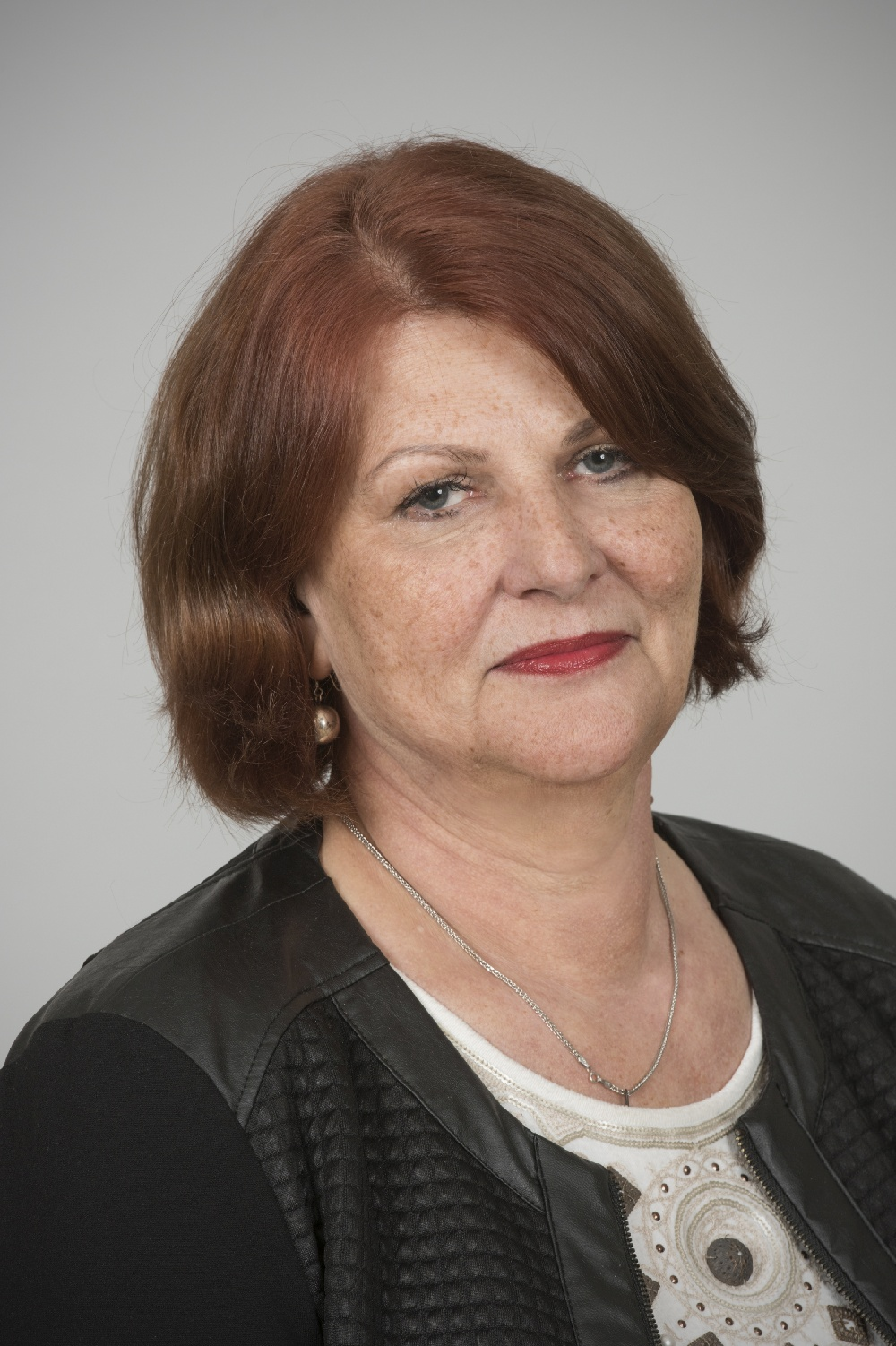

Minister of Labour and Pension System
- In office 22 January 2016 – 19 October 2016
- Prime Minister: Tihomir Orešković
- Preceded by: Mirando Mrsić
- Succeeded by: Tomislav Ćorić

Personal details
- Born: 27 March 1955 (age 71) Slavonski Brod, SR Croatia, SFR Yugoslavia
- Party: Croatian Democratic Union
- Education: School of Medicine, University of Zagreb

Nada Šikić (born 27 March 1955) is a Croatian politician who served as Minister of Labour and Pension System in the Government of Croatia from January to October 2016.

== Biography ==
Šikić was born in Slavonski Brod on 27 March 1955. She finished primary and secondary school in Slavonski Brod. She then graduated from the School of Medicine, University of Zagreb and specialized in the fields of neurology. She has a PhD in health and biomedicine.

Šikić served the president of the Committee for Pensioners, Pension System and Social Policy of the Croatian Democratic Union. She has written over 40 professional and scientific papers. In addition to her native Croatian, she also speaks English.

== Personal life ==
Šikić was born into a working-class family mother Paula, a bank clerk, and Mate, a fitter at the "Đuro Đaković" factory, as the youngest of three children. She has two older sisters, Ivana, a physics teacher, and Marija, a master of technology.

When Šikić was two years old, her mother Paula underwent surgery for a brain tumor, and she died soon after a series of unsuccessful radiations. Due to her mother's death, she decided to become a doctor in elementary school. Her mother was also an inspiration for a postgraduate degree in oncology and a specialization in neurology. In her free time Šikić enjoys hiking, rollerblading and cycling. She likes to read the works of Meša Selimović and Pope John Paul II.
