= Mayor of Zadar =

Mayor of the City of Zadar
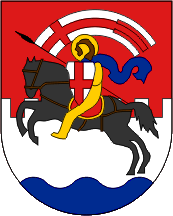
- Coat of arms of Zadar
- Incumbent; Šime Erlić since 10 June 2025
- Appointer: Direct elections (before 2007: Zadar City Council)
- Term length: 4 years, unlimited number of renewals
- Inaugural holder: Trifun Pasquale
- Salary: 3089,67 Euros
- Website: grad-zadar.hr/gradonacelnik

The Mayor of the City of Zadar (Croatian: Gradonačelnik Grada Zadar) is the highest official of the Croatian city of Zadar. From 1990 to 2007 the mayor was elected by the city assembly. Since 2007 Croatian mayors are elected directly by the citizens. The first such election in Zadar occurred in 2009.

== List ==
This is a list of the 50 people who have thus far served as Mayors of Zadar starting in 1805:

=== French Empire ===
No.	Mayor	Lifespan	Term of office		Party	Note
1	Trifun Pasquale		1805	1806		
2	Petar Damijani od Vrgade		1806	1811		
3	Andrija Borelli Vranski		1811	1813		

=== Austria-Hungary ===
No.	Mayor	Lifespan	Term of office		Party	Note
4	Nikola Pappafava	1770–1833	1813	1818		
5	Francesco de Sanfermo		1818	1830		
6	Antonio Alesani	1783–1845	1830	1832		
7	Antonio Cernizza (Crnica)		1832	1840		
8	Giulio Parma		1840	1840		
9	Antonio Rolli		1840	1841		
10	Franjo Borelli Vranski		1841	1844		
11	Antonio Nekić		1844	1848		
12	Marko Cernizza (Crnica)	d. 1862	1848	1858		
13	Antonio Nekić		1858	1861		
14	Kuzma Benja Posedarski	1809–1885	1861	1874		
15	Nikola Trigari	1827-1902	1874	1899		
16	Luigi Ziliotto	1863–1922	1900	1916		
17	Matej Škarić		1916	1918		
18	Alfons Borelli	1861–1934	1918	1918		

=== Kingdom of Italy ===
No.	Mayor	Lifespan	Term of office		Party	Note
19	Luigi Ziliotto	1863–1922	1918	1922		Second term.
20	Ascania Persicalli		1922	1922		
21	Antonio Alesani		1830	1832		
22	Vicko Fabiani		1922	1941		
23	Mario Sani		1941	1941		
24	Ivan Salghetti-Drioli		1941	1943		

=== Independent State of Croatia ===
No.	Mayor	Lifespan	Term of office		Party	Note
25	Karlo Höeberth		1943	1944		

=== Socialist Federal Republic of Yugoslavia ===
League of Communists of Yugoslavia

Mayors in this period held title of President of the Assembly of the Municipality of Zadar.

No.	Mayor	Lifespan	Term of office		Party	Note
26	Ivo Dražević		1945	1946	Communist Party of Yugoslavia	
27	Krsto Gjergja		1946	1947	Communist Party of Yugoslavia	
28	Drago Labar		1948	1950	Communist Party of Yugoslavia	
29	Mladen Buljevac	1918–2012	1950	1950	League of Communists of Yugoslavia	
30	Branko Modrić		1950	1950	League of Communists of Yugoslavia	
31	Edvin Andrović	1896–1973	1951	1951	League of Communists of Yugoslavia	
32	Ante Maštrović Nino		1951	1952	League of Communists of Yugoslavia	
33	Ante Sorić Golub		1952	1956	League of Communists of Yugoslavia	
34	Albin Švorinić		1956	1960	League of Communists of Yugoslavia	
35	Jovan Jokić		1960	1963	League of Communists of Yugoslavia	
36	Drago Strenja		1963	1967	League of Communists of Yugoslavia	
37	Božidar Papić		1985	1986	League of Communists of Yugoslavia	
38	Kažimir Zanki		1967	1972	League of Communists of Yugoslavia	
39	Julian Padelin		1972	1974	League of Communists of Yugoslavia	
40	Ivica Maštruko		1979	1986	League of Communists of Yugoslavia	
41	Josip Vlahović		1986	1990	League of Communists of Yugoslavia	

=== Republic of Croatia ===
Croatian Democratic Union

No.	Mayor	Lifespan	Term of office — Electoral mandate		Party	Note
42	Ivo Livljanić	1938–	1990	1992	Croatian Democratic Union	Formally known as President of the Assembly of the Municipality of Zadar.
43	Duško Kučina	1934–2017	1992	1994	Croatian Democratic Union	
44	Božidar Kalmeta		1994	2004	Croatian Democratic Union	Only mayor between 1990 and 2017 who was born in Zadar.
45	Ana Lovrin		2004	2006	Croatian Democratic Union	First woman mayor.
46	Živko Kolega		2006	2009	Croatian Democratic Union	
47	Zvonimir Vrančić		2009	2013	Croatian Democratic Union	
48	Božidar Kalmeta		2013	2017	Croatian Democratic Union	Third term.
49	Branko Dukić		2017	2025	Croatian Democratic Union	
50	Šime Erlić		2025	Incumbent	Croatian Democratic Union	

== See also ==
- Zadar
- Dalmatia
- Zadar County
- Elections in Croatia
