= Nataša Tramišak =

Croatian politician (born 1982)

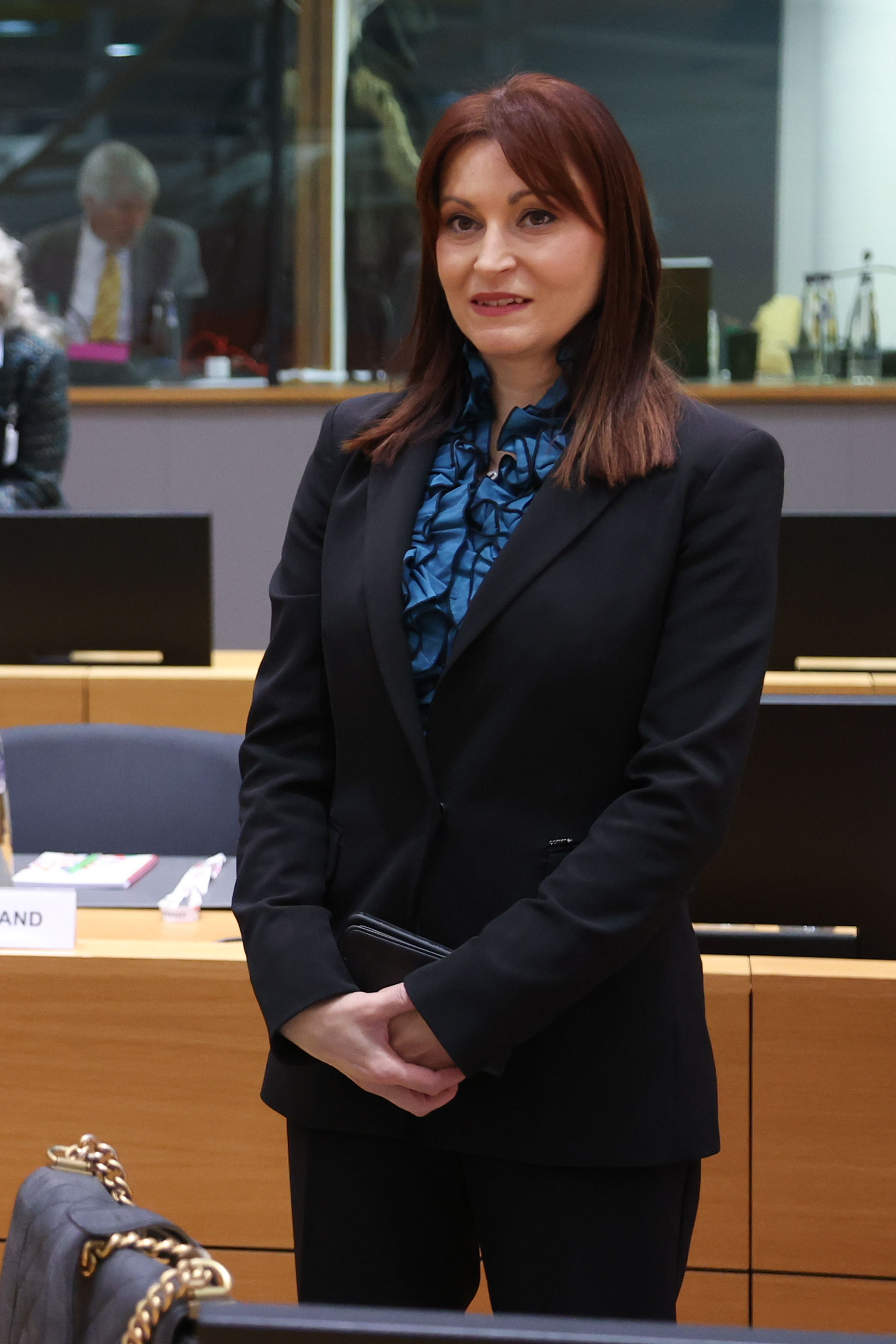
- Nataša Tramišak in 2022

Prefect of the Osijek-Baranja County
- Incumbent
- Assumed office 26 May 2025
- Preceded by: Mato Lukić

Minister of Regional Development and EU Funds
- In office 23 July 2020 – 17 January 2023
- Prime Minister: Andrej Plenković
- Preceded by: Marko Pavić
- Succeeded by: Šime Erlić

Personal details
- Born: 6 May 1982 (age 44) Osijek, SR Croatia, SFR Yugoslavia
- Party: Croatian Democratic Union
- Education: University of Osijek

Nataša Tramišak (born 6 May 1982) is a Croatian politician who currently serving as prefect of the Osijek-Baranja County. She previously served the Minister of Regional Development and EU Funds from 2020 to 2023.

== See also ==
- Cabinet of Andrej Plenković II
