= Benjamina Karić =

Bosnian politician (born 1991)

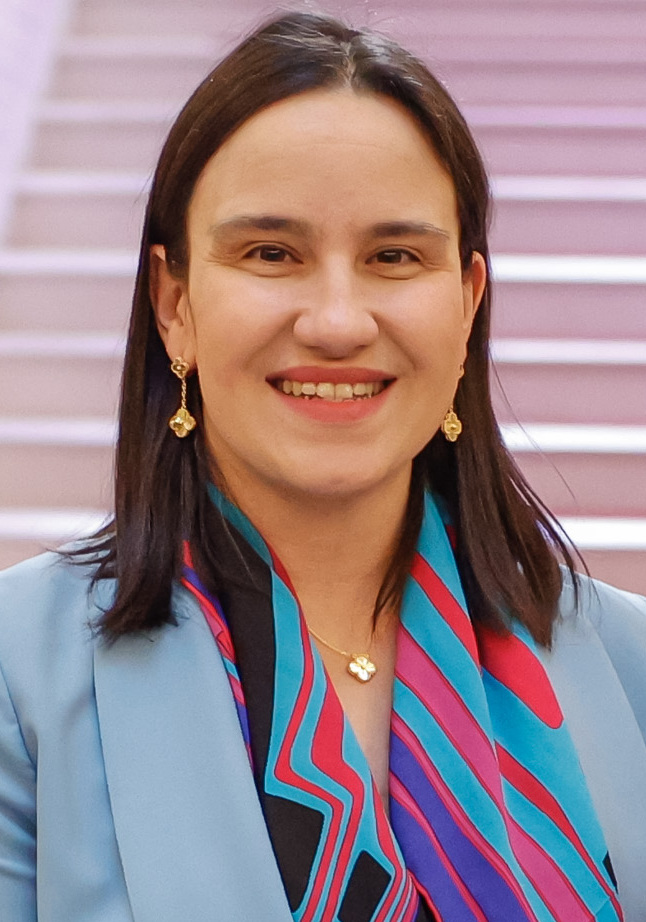
- Karić in 2023

Municipal Mayor of Novo Sarajevo
- Incumbent
- Assumed office 19 November 2024
- Preceded by: Hasan Tanović

39th Mayor of Sarajevo
- In office 8 April 2021 – 18 November 2024
- Preceded by: Abdulah Skaka
- Succeeded by: Predrag Puharić

Personal details
- Born: Benjamina Londrc; 8 April 1991 (age 35) Sarajevo, SR Bosnia and Herzegovina, SFR Yugoslavia
- Party: Social Democratic Party (2009–present)
- Spouse: Alen Karić
- Children: 1
- Education: University of Sarajevo (BA, LLB, LLM); University of Zenica (LLD)

Benjamina Karić (née Londrc; born 8 April 1991) is a Bosnian politician serving as the municipal mayor of Novo Sarajevo since November 2024. She previously served as the 39th mayor of Sarajevo from 2021 to 2024. She has been a member of the Social Democratic Party since 2009.

Karić was born in Sarajevo in 1991. She graduated from the University of Sarajevo and earned her doctorate from the University of Zenica. Karić later worked as an assistant at the Faculty of Law at the University of Travnik and in Kiseljak. Following the 2020 municipal elections, she became mayor of Sarajevo in 2021 as a replacement for Bogić Bogićević, who decided to pull out of the candidacy for mayor shortly before.

Karić served as mayor until November 2024, having been elected municipal mayor of Novo Sarajevo a month prior in the 2024 municipal elections.

== Early life and education ==
Karić was born on 8 April 1991 in Sarajevo, SR Bosnia and Herzegovina, SFR Yugoslavia, to Bosnian Muslim father Hasan Londrc and Serb mother Branka (née Đinđić). She graduated from two faculties at the same time, the Faculty of Law, University of Sarajevo and the Department of History of the Faculty of Philosophy in Sarajevo. She earned her doctorate in law from the University of Zenica in 2018.

Karić is a recipient of the Silver Badge of the University of Sarajevo for Outstanding Achievement in Undergraduate and Postgraduate Studies. She is an author of fifty publications, books, articles and translations from Latin to Bosnian.

In 2014, she was an assistant at the Faculty of Law, University of Travnik and in Kiseljak.

Karić joined the Social Democratic Party at the age of 18 in 2009, and was the party's vice president from 2019 to 2025.

== Mayor of Sarajevo (2021–2024) ==
=== Appointment ===
Following the 2020 Bosnian municipal elections, Bogić Bogićević, former member of the Presidency of Yugoslavia in the late 1980s and early 1990s, announced that he would accept the appointment as mayor of Sarajevo by the four-party liberal alliance, colloquially called the Four, which was set to govern the City Council after the elections, and that also included the Social Democratic Party (SDP BiH). However, on 24 March 2021, he decided to pull out of the candidacy because of conflicts in the alliance. Karić was then proposed as a potential candidate, with the SDP BiH officially announcing that she would be the new candidate for the office of mayor on 5 April 2021.

Three days later on 8 April, Karić was unanimously elected by members of the City Council of Sarajevo to become the 39th mayor of the city, succeeding Abdulah Skaka.

=== Tenure ===
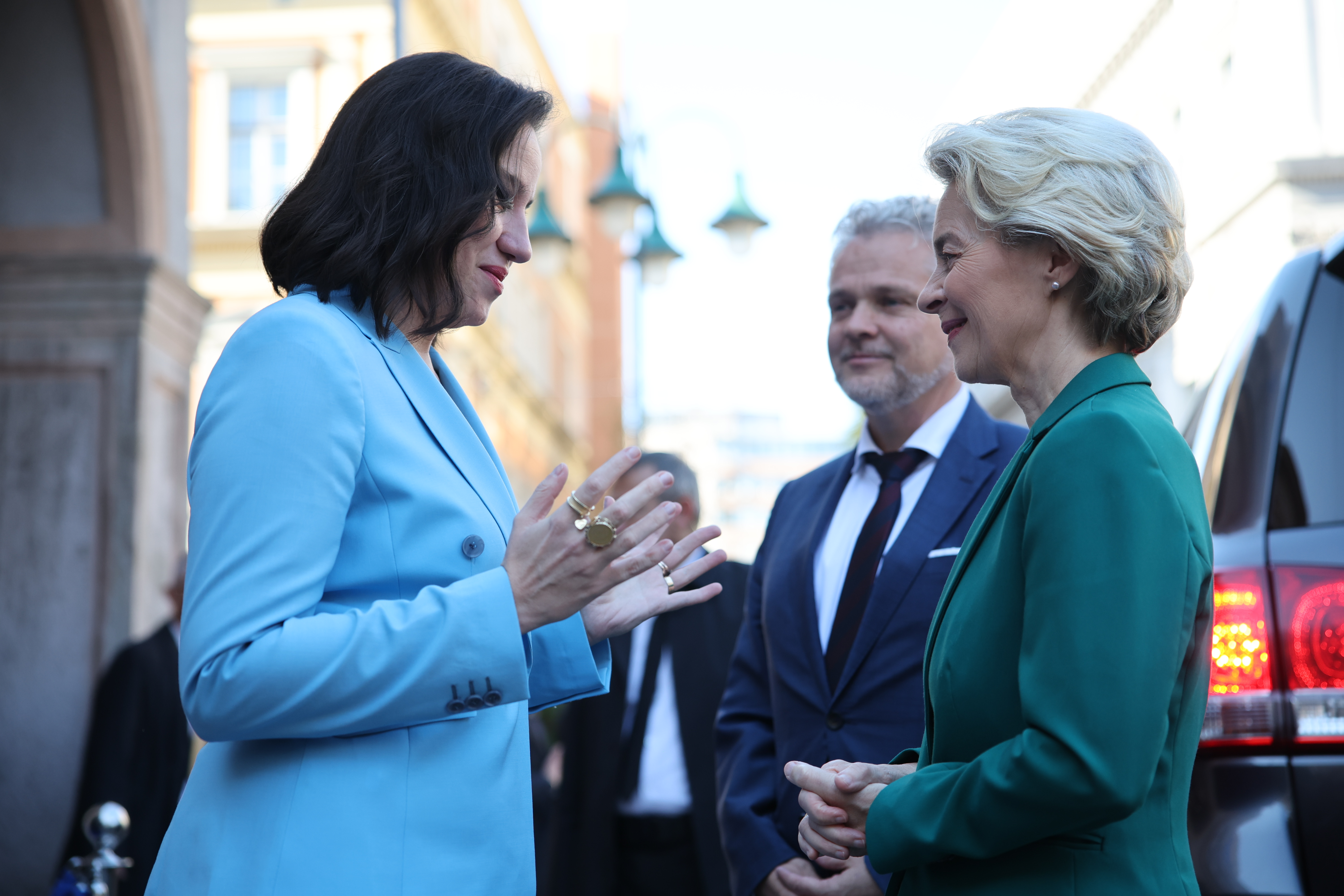
Karić with European Commission President Ursula von der Leyen, 28 October 2022

In June 2021, Karić visited the northwestern Bosnian city of Banja Luka, where she met with its mayor Draško Stanivuković, marking this event the first time since the end of the Bosnian War in 1995, that the mayors of both Sarajevo and Banja Luka, as the two largest cities of Bosnia and Herzegovina, had met each other. Later during that same month, Karić and Istočno Sarajevo mayor Ljubiša Ćosić signed a memorandum on the construction of a bike path, planned to connect Sarajevo and the town of Pale. On 30 June, the city's authorities launched a project to rebuild the astronomical observatory located on the mountain Trebević. On 8 July 2021, she visited Istanbul and there met with its mayor Ekrem İmamoğlu. On 17 July, the eve of her 100th day in office, Karić revealed plans for constructions of a large urban park, bike paths and excursion sites.

On 12 November 2021, the Sarajevo City Administration put up a monument in Kazani, honoring ethnic Serbs living inside besieged Sarajevo, who were victims of a mass murder by the forces of Mušan Topalović, commander of the 10th Mountain Brigade in the Army of the Republic of Bosnia and Herzegovina during the Bosnian War. On 15 November, Karić and High Representative Christian Schmidt unveiled the monument. UDIK, which was one of initiators of the monument, and families of the victims did not attend the unveiling after it was revealed that the perpetrators' names would be omitted from the plaque.

In 2022, the City of Sarajevo undertook a comprehensive restoration of the Bistrik railway station, a national monument of Bosnia and Herzegovina. The restored building was officially reopened on 6 April 2022, with Karić expressing pride in reviving the iconic structure, highlighting its importance to the city's heritage. Throughout 2023, façades in Sarajevo's center, mostly those built during the Austro-Hungarian period, underwent renovations.

In June 2023, Karić refused to project the rainbow flag, a symbol of LGBT pride, on the City Hall, and opted not to publicly show her support for the LGBT community, unlike most of her fellow SDP BiH members who have regularly showed support for the community.

Following a large escalation of the Gaza–Israel conflict in October 2023, Karić said it was "hypocritical to condemn Hamas' attack on Israel, and not to condemn all that happened before and after it".

In June 2024, it was reported that Karić would run for municipal mayor of Novo Sarajevo, a municipality within the city of Sarajevo, in the Bosnian municipal elections. The SDP BiH confirmed Karić's candidacy in July 2024. In the elections, held on 6 October 2024, she was narrowly elected municipal mayor of Novo Sarajevo, obtaining 42.21% of the vote, while her main opponent, Muamer Bandić, won 40.41%. Her term as mayor of Sarajevo ended on 18 November 2024. She was sworn in as Novo Sarajevo municipal mayor the following day.

== Personal life ==
She is married to Alen Karić, and together they have one child. She lives with her family in Sarajevo.

In addition to her native Bosnian, Karić speaks English and German fluently.

Political offices
Preceded by Hasan Tanović	Municipal Mayor of Novo Sarajevo; 2024–present	Incumbent
Preceded by Abdulah Skaka	Mayor of Sarajevo; 2021–2024	Succeeded by Predrag Puharić
