= Branko Grčić =

Croatian politician and economist

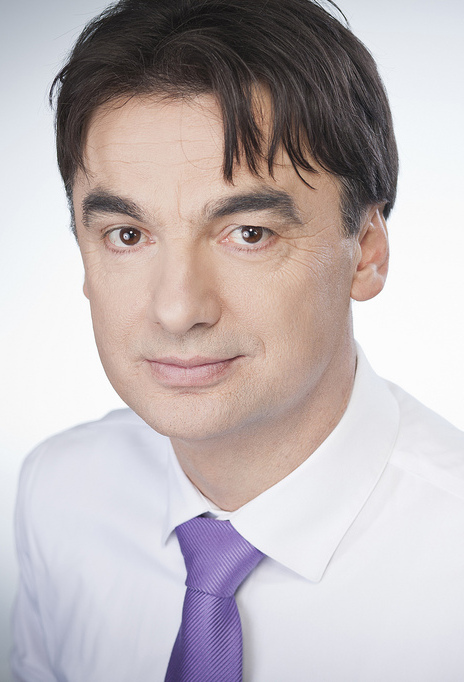

Deputy Prime Minister of Croatia
- In office 23 December 2011 – 22 January 2016
- Prime Minister: Zoran Milanović
- Preceded by: Petar Čobanković
- Succeeded by: Božo Petrov

Minister of Regional Development and EU Funds
- In office 23 December 2011 – 22 January 2016
- Prime Minister: Zoran Milanović
- Preceded by: Office established
- Succeeded by: Tomislav Tolušić

Personal details
- Born: 16 April 1964 (age 62) Knin, SR Croatia, SFR Yugoslavia
- Party: Social Democratic Party
- Education: University of Split

Branko Grčić (born 16 April 1964) is a Croatian politician and economist. In 1987 he graduated on the Faculty of Economics in the University of Split. He got his master's degree in economics in 1990 and received a Doctorate on the same university in 1996. Since 2005 he had been a regular professor and later became Dean of the Faculty of Economics in Split. He has published over 60 scientific works focusing on macroeconomics and regional economics. He is a member of the Croatian branch of the European Regional Science Association. From December 23, 2011, to January 22, 2016, he was the Deputy Prime Minister and Minister of Regional Development and EU Funds in the centre left Cabinet of Zoran Milanović.

Political offices
Preceded by Slobodan Uzelac and Domagoj Ivan Milošević	Deputy Prime Minister; Serving alongside Radimir Čačić, Neven Mimica and Milanka Opačić; 2011–2016	Succeeded by Božo Petrov
Preceded by Ministry created	Minister of Regional Development and EU Funds; 2011–2016	Succeeded by Tomislav Tolušić
