= Bistrik railway station =

Bosnian railway station

Bistrik Railway Station Building
- Zgrada željezničke stanice Bistrik
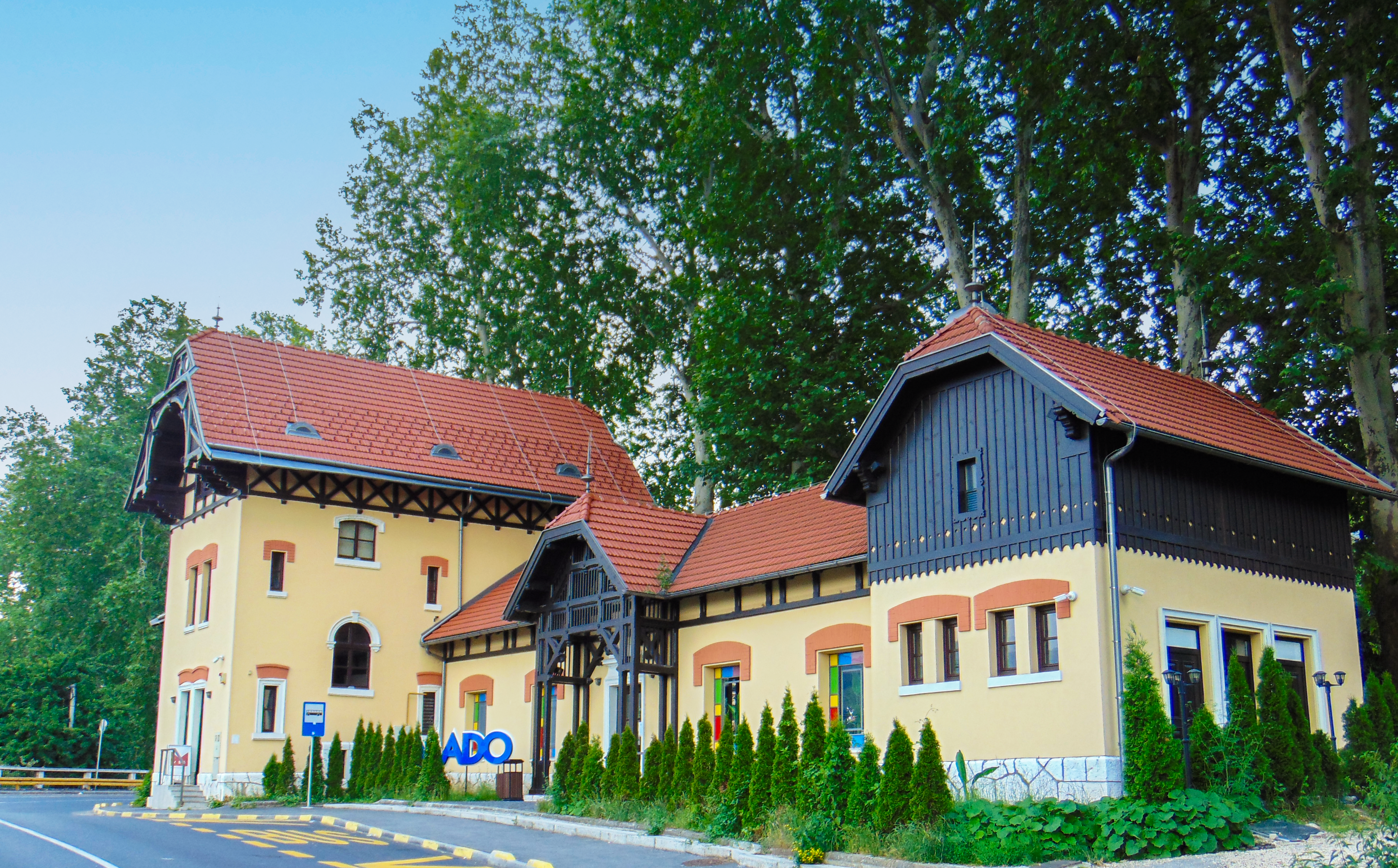
- Bistrik Railway Station in 2026
- Interactive map of the Bistrik Railway Station Building area

General information
- Status: Preserved
- Architectural style: Alpine-Romantic
- Location: Bistrik, Sarajevo, Bosnia and Herzegovina
- Coordinates: 43.852753°N 18.432347°E
- Opened: 1906
- Renovated: 2022
- Owner: City of Sarajevo

Bistrik railway station (Bosnian: Zgrada željezničke stanice Bistrik; Serbo-Croatian Cyrillic: Зграда жељезничке станице Бистрик) is a historic monument and one of 101 national monuments in the Sarajevo area located in the Bistrik neighborhood of Sarajevo, Bosnia and Herzegovina.

== History ==
The station itself wasn't built until the Southern Railway was completed on 5 October 1882 after 15 years of construction. In 1906, the Austro-Hungarian authorities built the station alongside a buffet bar, a managerial room, freight storage, tunnels, a bridge and other facilities. The project was undertaken by the Technical Department of the Bosnia and Herzegovina State Railways and remains the only surviving railway from the Austro-Hungarian period.

The station officially closed in 1973, with the last locomotive, "Ćiro", leaving the platform in early August of 1978. It continued to remained in poor structural condition, partly due to the war and inadequate construction interventions.

== Architecture ==
The station building is designed in the Alpine-Romantic style of Austro-Hungarian architecture. The style is commonly seen by accentuated sloping roofs and richly processed wooden eaves.

== Preservation and Renovation ==
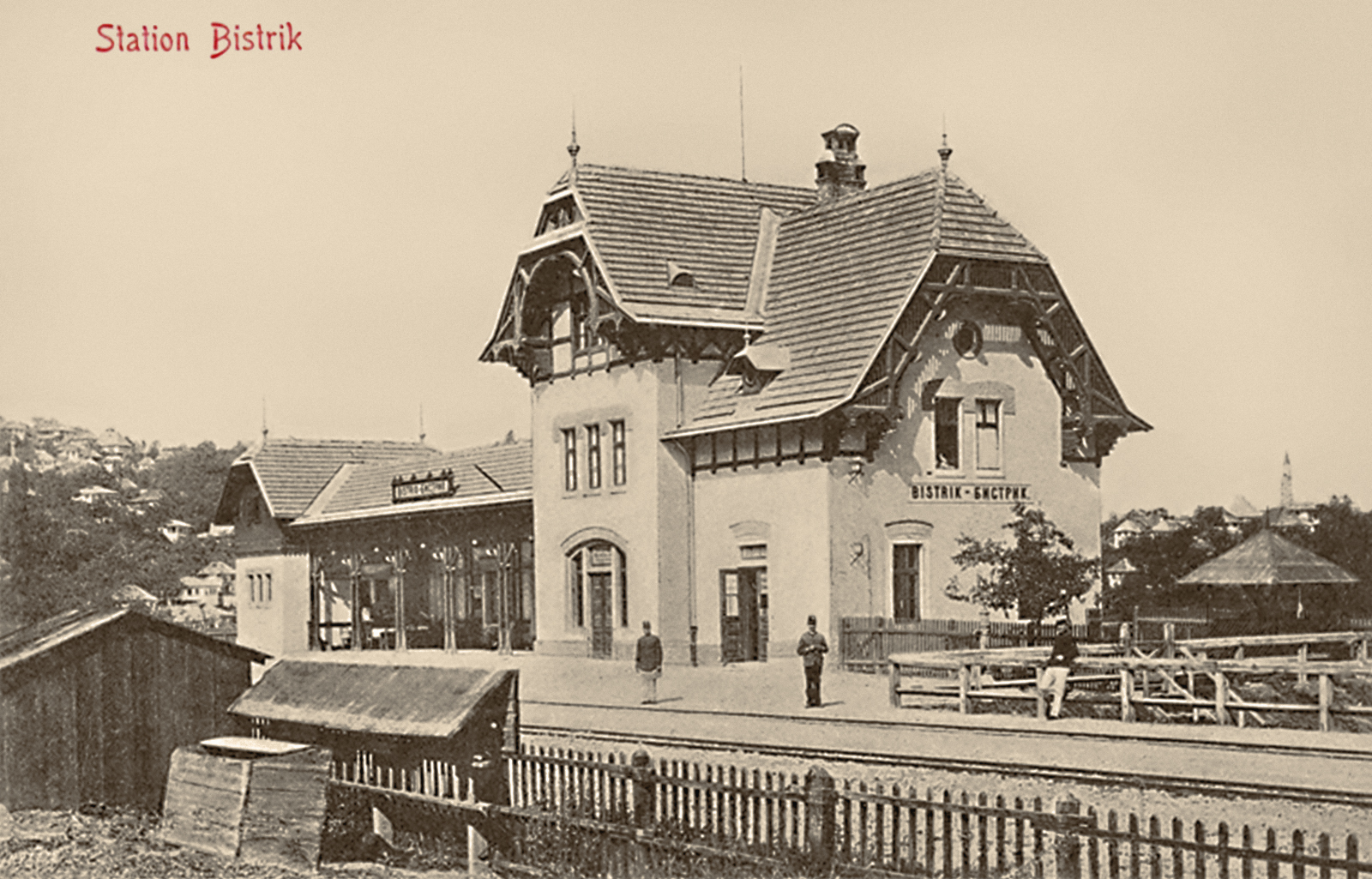
Bistrik station, 1910 postcard

In 2006, the Commission to Preserve National Monuments of Bosnia and Herzegovina declared the Bistrik railway station as a state national monument during a session held from 4 to 10 July of 2006 after a petition was submitted by Elša Turkušić.

The process of renovation however was delayed due to the fact that it was converted into a residential housing area and was lived by seven families for years up until that point. In June 2019, the City Council of Sarajevo resolved all property-legal relations and finally entered into possession.

Renovation of the station began on 19 October 2020 and was led by mayor Abdulah Skaka. It was officially put back into use on April 6, 2022 with restoration costing about 2.9 million KM.

The restored station was separated into two parts, a catering area and a museum honoring filmmaker Hajrudin Krvavac.

== Cultural significance ==
The Bistrick station was prominently featured in one part of the film Walter Defends Sarajevo, which was released in 1972.
