= 2013 Zagreb local elections =

Municipal elections in Zagreb, Croatia

2013 Zagreb mayoral election
- 2 June 2013
- Turnout: 38.05%
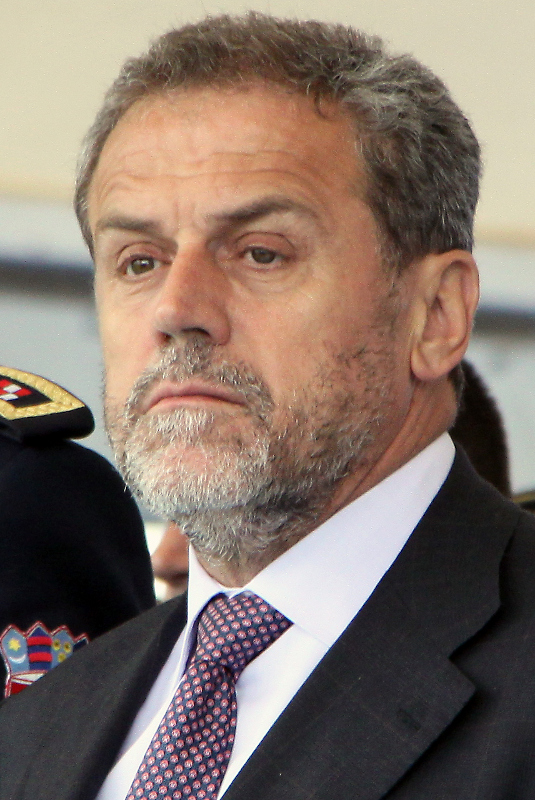

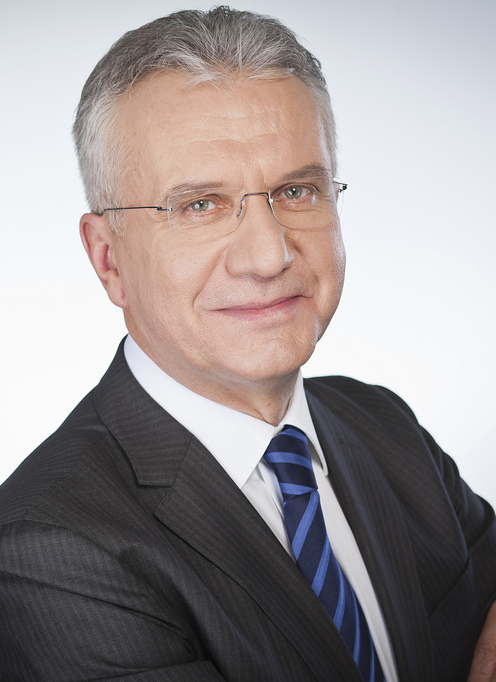
Candidate	Milan Bandić	Rajko Ostojić
Party	Independent	SDP
Popular vote	170,798	84,179
Percentage	65.67%	32.37%
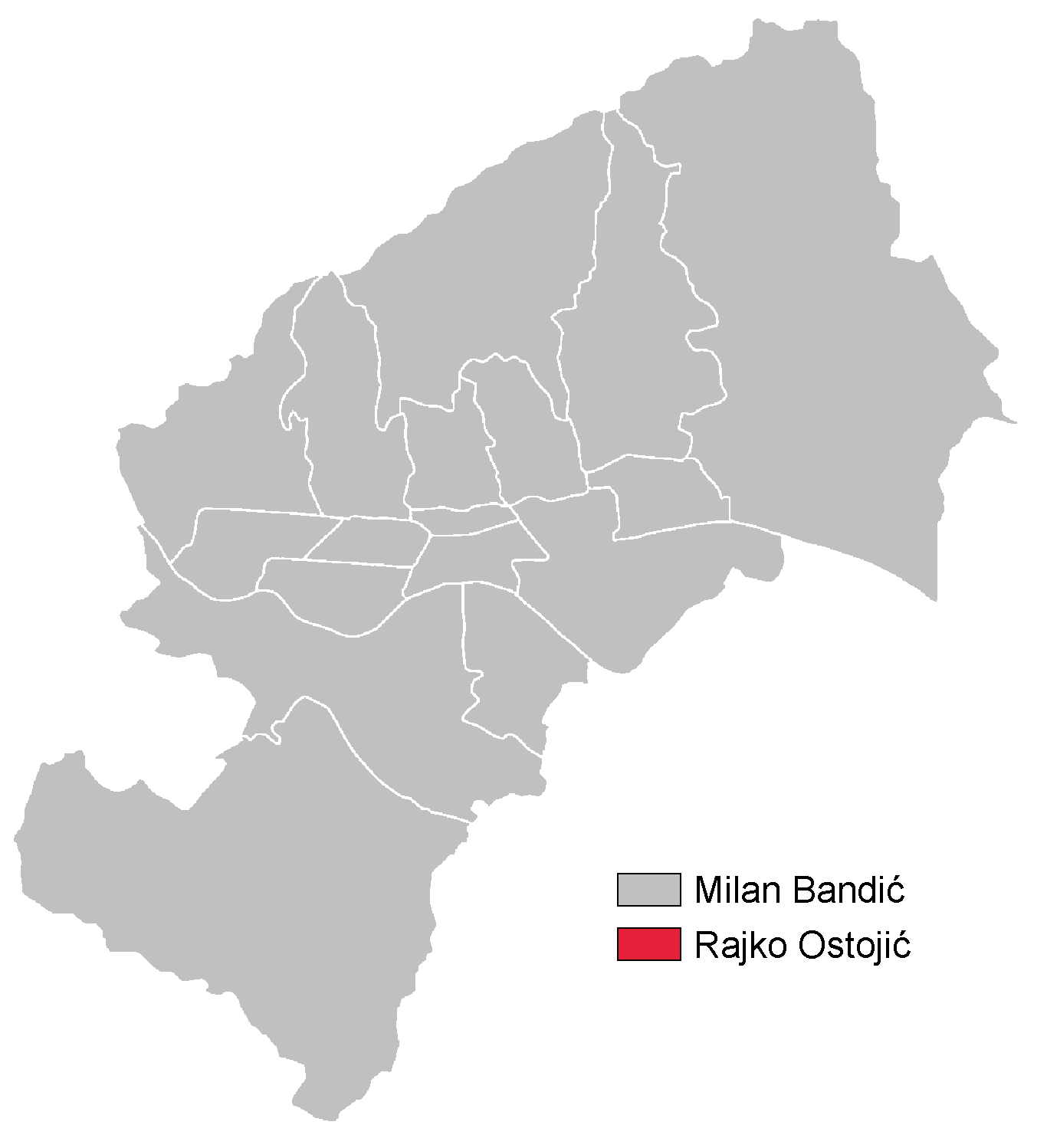
- Results of the second round in all Districts of Zagreb: the candidate with the majority of votes in each district: Milan Bandić Rajko Ostojić
Mayor before election
Milan Bandić
Social Democratic Party (Croatia)
Elected mayor
Milan Bandić
Independent

Elections were held on 19 May 2013 in Zagreb, the capital of Croatia, to elect the mayor and members of the Zagreb Assembly. A second round of mayoral election was held on 2 June 2013.

== Results ==
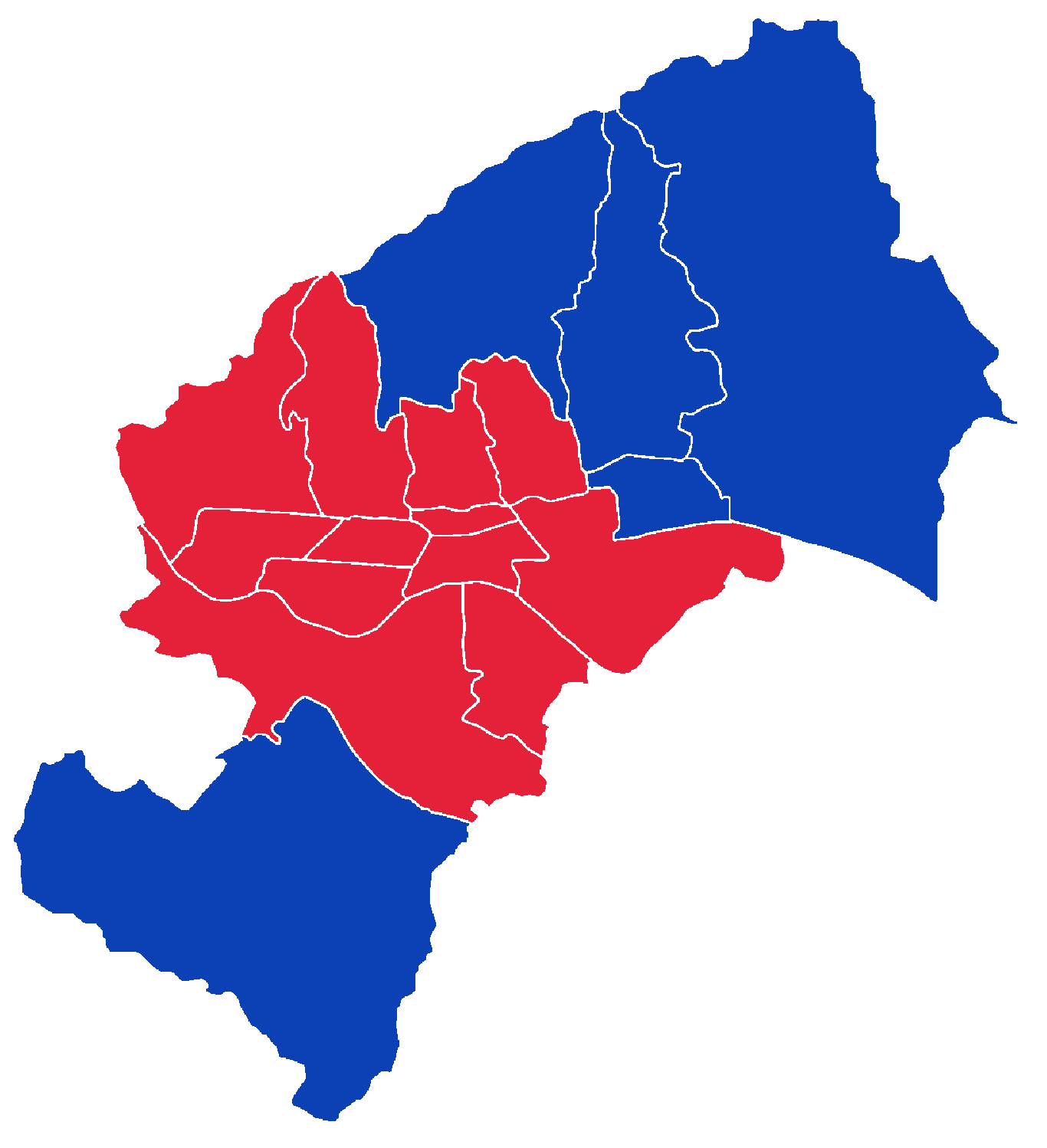
Results of the election for councils of Districts of Zagreb: the party with the majority of votes in each district: Social Democratic Party of Croatia Croatian Democratic Union

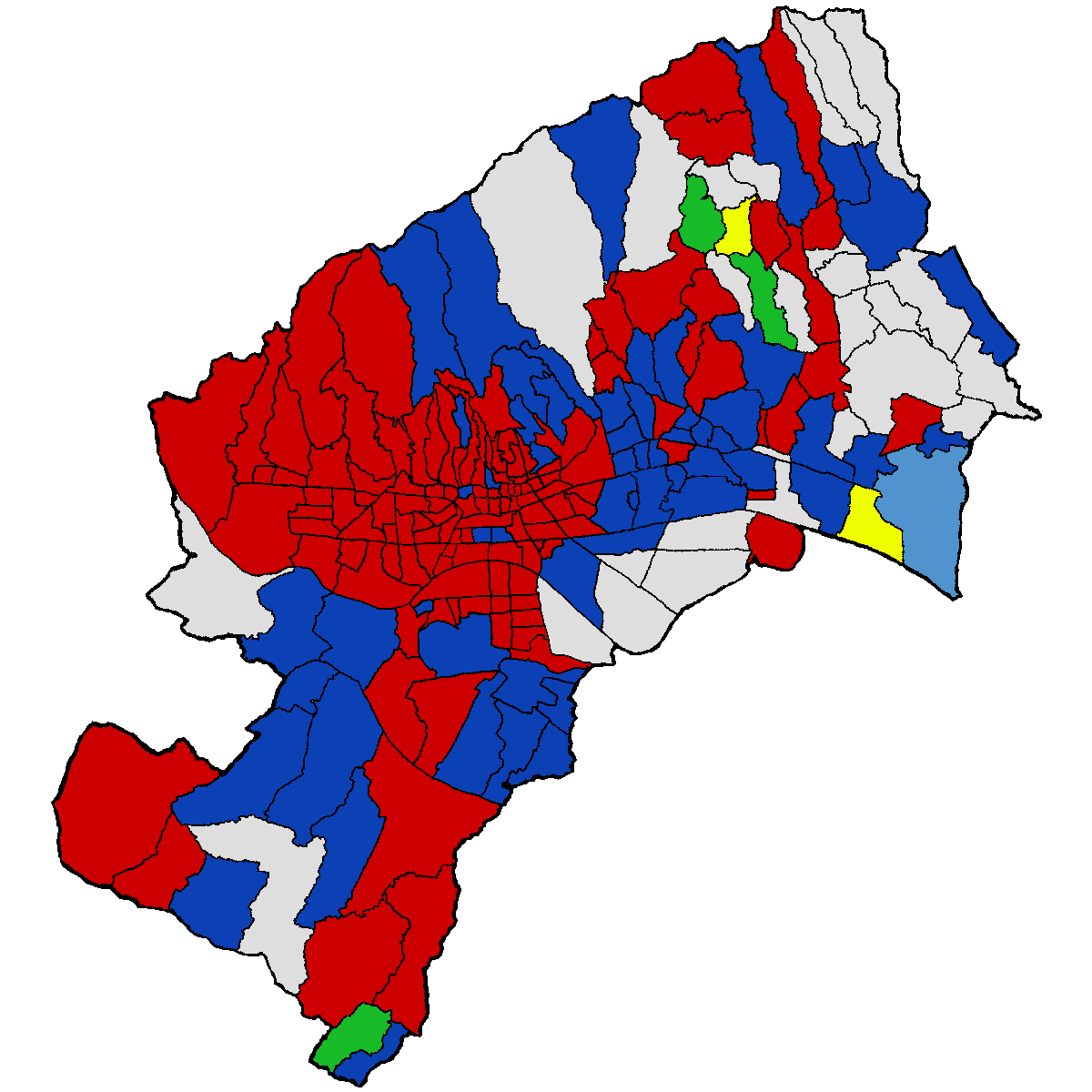
Results of the election for councils of local committees: the party with the majority of votes in each committee: Social Democratic Party of Croatia Croatian Democratic Union Croatian Peasant Party Croatian Social Liberal Party Croatian Growth Independent

=== Mayor ===
Candidate	Party	First round		Second round	
Candidate	Party	Votes	%	Votes	%
Milan Bandić	Independent	142,646	47.76	170,798	66.99
Rajko Ostojić	Social Democratic Party	68,475	22.93	84,179	33.01
Vladimir Ferdelji	Croatian Social Liberal Party	55,263	18.50		
Margareta Mađerić	Croatian Democratic Union	16,316	5.46		
Tatjana Holjevac	Zagreb Independent List	6,161	2.06		
Branko Vukšić	Croatian Labourists – Labour Party	5,908	1.98		
Ante-Zvonimir Golem	Independent	2,334	0.78		
Siniša Šukunda	Croatian Party of Rights	1,545	0.52		
Total		298,648	100.00	254,977	100.00
Valid votes		298,648	98.14	254,977	98.08
Invalid/blank votes		5,649	1.86	4,997	1.92
Total votes		304,297	100.00	259,974	100.00
Registered voters/turnout		682,204	44.60	683,573	38.03
Source: State Election Committee

=== Assembly election ===
List holder	Party	Votes	%	Seats
Davor Bernardić	Social Democratic Party of Croatia	73,569	25.24%	17
Davor Bernardić	Croatian People's Party - Liberal Democrats	73,569	25.24%	17
Davor Bernardić	Croatian Party of Pensioners	73,569	25.24%	17
Davor Bernardić	Green Party, Croatian Party of Greens – Eco-Alliance, Green Alliance, Independent Democratic Serb Party	73,569	25.24%	17
Milan Bandić	Milan Bandić list	70,988	24.36%	17
Andrija Mikulić	Croatian Democratic Union	42,905	14.72%	10
Andrija Mikulić	Croatian Party of Rights dr. Ante Starčević	42,905	14.72%	10
Andrija Mikulić	Bloc Pensioners Together	42,905	14.72%	10
Andrija Mikulić	Zagorje Party, Democratic Party of Zagorje, Croatian Democratic Party	42,905	14.72%	10
Vladimir Ferdelji	Croatian Social Liberal Party	32,472	11.14%	7
Vladimir Ferdelji	Croatian Peasant Party	32,472	11.14%	7
Vladimir Ferdelji	Green List, Democratic Party of Pensioners	32,472	11.14%	7
Branko Vukšić	Croatian Labourists – Labour Party	14,035	4.82%	0
	Other parties and independent lists	57,486	19.72%	0

=== Councils of districts ===
Distribution of seats per district
District	SDP HSU	HDZ	HSLS HSS	Lab	Hrast HSP AS	Za grad	Others
Donji Grad	6	3	1	1	1	1	2
Gornji Grad – Medveščak	6	4	1	1	1	1	1
Trnje	7	3	1			1	3
Maksimir	6	5	1	1		1	1
Peščenica – Žitnjak	7	6	1	2			3
Novi Zagreb – istok	10	5	1	1		1	1
Novi Zagreb – zapad	6	5	1	2	1		4
Trešnjevka – sjever	9	5	2	2	1		
Trešnjevka – jug	9	5	1	2	1	1	
Črnomerec	6	5	1	2	1		
Gornja Dubrava	6	6	1	1	2		3
Donja Dubrava	4	4	1	1	1		4
Stenjevec	7	4	4	1	2		1
Podsused – Vrapče	5	3	1	2	2		2
Podsljeme	2	3		1	1		4
Sesvete	5	5	1		2		6
Brezovica	3	4	1				3
Totals	104	75	20	20	16	6	37

== See also ==
- 2013 Croatian local elections
- List of mayors in Croatia
- List of mayors of Zagreb
