= Šime Erlić =

Croatian politician (born 1985)

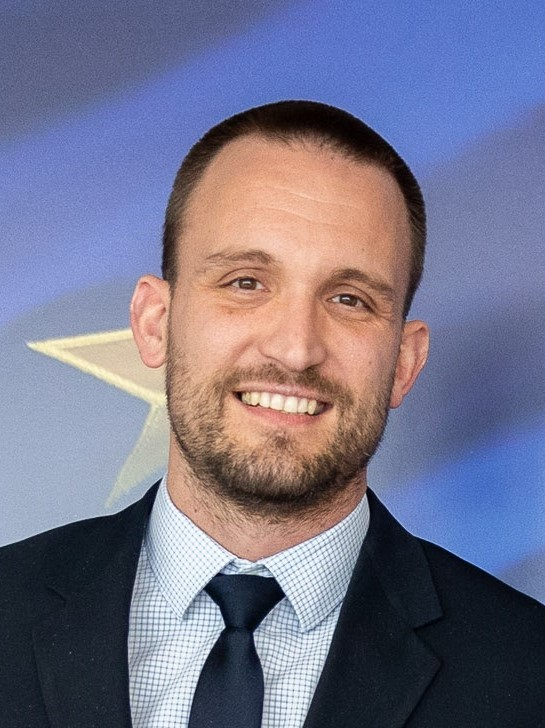
- Erlić in 2023

Mayor of Zadar
- Incumbent
- Assumed office 10 June 2025
- Preceded by: Branko Dukić

Minister of Regional Development and EU Funds
- In office 17 January 2023 – 15 July 2025
- Prime Minister: Andrej Plenković
- Preceded by: Nataša Tramišak
- Succeeded by: Nataša Mikuš Žigman

Personal details
- Born: 22 May 1985 (age 41) Zadar, SR Croatia, SFR Yugoslavia
- Party: Croatian Democratic Union (2003–present)
- Spouse: Kristina Erlić
- Children: 3
- Education: University of Zagreb
- Occupation: Politician, economist

Šime Erlić (born 22 May 1985) is a Croatian politician and economist who has served as mayor of Zadar since 2025. He is the member of the Croatian Democratic Union.

From 2023 to 2025, he served as Minister of Regional Development and EU funds, and from 2020 to 2023, he served as a state secretary of the Ministry of Regional Development and EU Funds. On 1 June 2025, he was elected mayor of Zadar, beating candidate Daniel Radeta in the second round of voting.
