= Nada Murganić =

Croatian politician

Minister of Demographics, Family, Youth and Social Policy
- In office 19 October 2016 – 19 July 2019
- President: Kolinda Grabar-Kitarović
- Prime Minister: Andrej Plenković
- Preceded by: Bernardica Juretić
- Succeeded by: Vesna Bedeković

Personal details
- Born: Nada Lešić; 14 January 1958 (age 68) Karlovac, PR Croatia, FPR Yugoslavia (modern Croatia)
- Party: Croatian Democratic Union (1995–present)
- Spouse: Vitomir Murganić
- Children: Korana (b. 1982)
- Education: University of Zagreb

Nada Murganić (born 14 January 1958) is a Croatian social worker and politician. She is a member of the conservative Croatian Democratic Union (HDZ).

== Early life and education ==
Nada Murganić was born on 14 January 1958 in Karlovac to Petar and Marija (nee Lesić) Lešić. After finishing elementary and high school in her hometown, she enrolled in 1976 at the Zagreb School of Law from which she graduated social work in 1981.

== Career ==
Following graduation, Murganić got employed at the Karlovac branch of the Croatian Red Cross where she worked as a social worker and home care manager for 150 people, as well as a volunteer coordinator. In 1990, she started working at the Sveti Antun Retirement Home in Karlovac, at first as institutions' social worker and technical unit manager, then as head for the accommodation of refugees, and eventually as institutions' director. She also served two short mandates as member of the Croatian Parliament, both times as a replacement, first time for Andrej Plenković (31 January 2014 - 28 December 2015), who was elected to the European Parliament, and second for Damir Jelić (22 January 2016 - 14 October 2016), Mayor of Karlovac. On 19 October 2016, Murganić was appointed Minister of Demographics, Family, Youth and Social Policy in the Cabinet of Andrej Plenković.

== Controversies ==
In March 2017, Murganić was criticized for delaying the ratification of the Convention on preventing and combating violence against women and domestic violence and for including in the working group for the ratification of the convention representatives of radical Catholic organizations In the Name of the Family and Ordo Iuris Hrvatska, which are opposing ratification.

On 6 July 2017, the Government adopted the final draft of the new Ombudsman for Children Act according to which it's still possible to dismiss the ombudsman every year, despite an 8-year long mandate. Ombudsman Ivana Milas Klarić, the professor at the Chair of Family Law of the University of Zagreb, criticized the draft and stated that Murganić told her during their meeting: "I and HDZ think that you are SDP." Milas Klarić added that she was never a member of any party and that her dismissal wasn't a problem but that "it's clear that there are no independent institutions in Croatia."

In September 2017, Ministry of Demographics, Family, Youth and Social Policy sent for a public consultation the final draft of the new Family Law which, among other, stipulated that "(...) the family consists of: mother, father and their children, mother or father with child although they don't live together, and other relatives living with them", meaning that couples with no children, same-sex couples with or without children and a number of other combinations were no longer considered to be a family. The draft was drafted by Mugranić and her team from the Ministry without the involvement of a working group of experts which worked on the previous draft. In addition, the draft proposed abolition of the obligation to draw up a parenting plan for parents who are in a process of divorce. After broad public criticism, including from the Prime Minister Andrej Plenković himself, the Government decided to withdraw the draft less than 24 hours it was realised for public consultation. Afterwards, Murganić confirmed that the definition of the family would be completely removed from the new draft and publicly apologized. In November 2017, SDP, MOST, HSS, GLAS, HSU, ŽZ, SNAGA, IDS and PH initiated motion of no confidence against Mugranić. On 11 November 2017, motion was rejected by 78 out of 151 MP's.

On 7 December 2017, Nova TV reported that Murganić approved handing out of packages, financed with the funds provided by the Fund for European Aid to the Most Deprived and European Social Fund, meant as gifts for poor children for the holidays in a private kindergarten ran by the Catholic Church. When confronted, Murganić and her deputy Margareta Mađerić ran from the cameras. Murganić later stated that those were promotional packages that weren't purchased with the money from the EU funds intended for humanitarian organizations. GLAS called Murganić to resign "due to all past failures and non-functioning of the system of [her] Ministry." European Anti-Fraud Office (OLAF) announced that it would investigate the case.

Mara Tomašević, wife of the prefect of Požega-Slavonia County Alojz Tomašević (HDZ), who has accused him of domestic violence (repeat humiliation, threatening, grabbing by the neck and slapping), which resulted in calls for his resignation as prefect and ejection from HDZ, suddenly withdrew charges she filed with the Požega County Court against her husband. On 11 January 2017, while commenting on whether she found that sudden withdrawal of charges strange, Murganić stated: "They should have resolved this earlier, within their family relationship. That's the marriage. In these family, marital and personal relationships, there are dynamics which I cannot comment on. The woman probably has her reasons. That is family; I really would not discuss that." Murganić's statement provoked broad criticism. Later, she stated that her statement was misinterpreted and that she condemns violence against woman. SDP announced that it would initiate motion of no confidence procedure against Murganić is she doesn't resign.

On 20 February 2018, state secretary for demography Marin Strmota, a professor at the Faculty of Economics and Business of the University of Zagreb, resigned during a press conference in front of minister Murganić who right before presented the conclusions of the fourth meeting of the Council for the Demographic Revitalisation of Croatia. Strmota agreed with the reporters who accused Murganić of presenting the same measures from three months ago and stated that "this is a big folklore. After a year and four months in the government, as a demographer, and young men, I think this isn't serious enough."

== Personal life ==
Nada Murganić is married to economist Vitomir Murganić with whom she has daughter Korana who is a defectologist by profession. She is Roman Catholic.
