= Ministry of Labour, Pension System, Family and Social Policy =

Ministry of the Croatian government

Ministry of Labour, Pension System, Family and Social Policy Ministarstvo rada, mirovinskoga sustava, obitelji i socijalne politike

Ministry overview
- Formed: 31 May 1990; 36 years ago
- Type: Ministry in the Government of Croatia
- Jurisdiction: Croatia
- Headquarters: Ulica grada Vukovara 78, Zagreb, Croatia
- Employees: 610 (2025)
- Budget: €10.4 billion (2025 budget)
- Website: mrosp.gov.hr

Minister
- Currently: Alen Ružić since 20 February 2026

The Ministry of Labour, Pension System, Family and Social Policy of the Republic of Croatia (Croatian: Ministarstvo rada, mirovinskoga sustava, obitelji i socijalne politike) is the ministry in the Government of Croatia which performs administrative and other tasks related to employment policy, regulation of labor relations, labor market and active employment policy, system and policy of pension insurance and relations with trade unions and employers associations in the area of employment relations.

== Role ==
The Ministry of Labour, Pension System, Family and Social Policy performs administrative and other tasks related to:

- employment policy,
- regulation of employment relations;
- labor market and active employment policy;
- programs of job retraining and increasing employability;
- unemployment records and employment assistance;
- pension insurance system and policy;
- social partnership and relations with trade unions and employers' associations in the field of labor relations, labor market and employment;
- labor status of Croatian citizens employed abroad and matters related to their return and employment in the country;
- labor status of foreign citizens employed in the Republic of Croatia;
- improvement of the occupational safety and health system;
- international cooperation in the field of labor and employment;
- care for persons and families who do not have sufficient means to meet basic living needs or who need assistance to eliminate the causes of social vulnerability;
- establishing a network of social welfare institutions and a network of activities and coordinating their work and providing professional assistance;
- conducting administrative, inspection and expert supervision over the work of social welfare institutions, local and regional self-government units, chambers, permanent collection of humanitarian aid, humanitarian actions, other legal and natural persons providing social services and over the performance of nanny activities;
- deciding on the establishment, termination and status changes of social welfare institutions;
- disseminating and analysing data on beneficiaries in the social welfare system and preparing statistical reviews and reports;
- promoting the rights of persons with disabilities, improving their quality of life and developing non-institutional forms of care for persons with disabilities;
- improving legislative regulations for the purpose of improving the quality of life of beneficiary groups under the jurisdiction of the Ministry and developing social welfare services for their needs, developing non-institutional forms of care for the elderly, performing other tasks of caring for the elderly that are not placed under the jurisdiction of other bodies;
- protecting victims of human trafficking;
- protecting refugees and ensuring the integration of asylum seekers and persons under subsidiary protection, protecting children and young adults with behavioural problems and including them in everyday life after a longer stay in an educational institution;
- rehabilitation and resocialization of addicts and prevention of all forms of addiction;
- administrative and professional tasks related to foster care and adoption;
- marriage and marital relations and special protection of families in which mutual relations are disrupted;
- protection from domestic violence;
- mutual relations between parents and children;
- protection of children whose parents live separately, protection of children without appropriate parental care, promotion of responsible parenthood, maintenance and care of family members;
- promotion of the development of community work programs, development and affirmation of volunteerism and the work of citizens' associations that support parents, families, children, children with developmental disabilities and the elderly and all socially vulnerable groups of the population;
- promotion and establishment of counseling centers for children, parents, children with developmental disabilities, the elderly and victims of domestic violence;
- study and research of contemporary problems of families, children, children with developmental disabilities and the elderly and provision of preventive and therapeutic assistance.

The Ministry participates in the preparation of programs and projects and the implementation of projects from the European Union programs and other forms of international assistance.

Furthermore, it participates with the ministry responsible for managing state property in the management and disposal of shares and business interests of companies that constitute state property owned by the Republic of Croatia, and in relation to companies that predominantly engage in activities within the prescribed jurisdiction of this Ministry.

== Organization ==
The Ministry has a total of 610 staff (as of 2025), working in the following departments:

Department	Croatian language	Staff
Cabinet of the Minister	Kabinet Ministra	18
General Secretariat	Glavno tajništvo	54
Directorate for Labor and Occupational Safety	Uprava za rad i zaštitu na radu	49
Directorate for the Labor Market and Employment	Uprava za tržište rada i zapošljavanje	31
Pension System Directorate	Uprava za mirovinski sustav	31
European Union Programmes Directorate	Uprava za programe Europske Unije	133
Finance and Projects Directorate	Uprava za financije i projekte	101
Family Directorate	Uprava za obitelj	53
Social Policy Directorate	Uprava za socijalnu politiku	64
Independent Sector for Administrative and Supervisory Oversight in Social Welfare	Samostalni sektor za upravni i inspekcijski nadzor u socijalnoj skrbi	35
Independent Sector for Appellate Procedure	Samostalni sektor za drugostupanjski postupak	14
Independent Sector for Audit and Supervision of Medical Expertise	Samostalni sektor za reviziju i nadzor medicinskog vještačenja	11
Independent Sector for the Coordination of European Affairs and International Cooperation	Samostalni sektor za koordinaciju europskih poslova i međunarodne suradnje	11
Independent Internal Audit Service	Samostalna služba za unutarnju reviziju	5

== List of ministers ==
=== Minister of Labour and Veteran and Disability Issues (1990–1991) ===
Minister	Party	Term start	Term end	Days in office
Marin Črnja	HDZ	30 May 1990	4 March 1991	278

=== Ministers of Labour, Social Welfare and Family (1991–1993) ===
Minister	Party	Term start	Term end	Days in office
Bernardo Jurlina	HDZ	4 March 1991	15 April 1992	408
Josip Juras	HDZ	15 April 1992	3 April 1993	353

=== Ministers of Labour and Social Welfare (1993–2003) ===
Minister	Party	Term start	Term end	Days in office
Josip Juras	HDZ	3 April 1993	12 October 1993	192
Ivan Parać	HDZ	12 October 1993	27 January 1995	472
Joso Škara	HDZ	27 January 1995	27 January 2000	1,826
Davorko Vidović	SDP	27 January 2000	23 December 2003	1,426

From 23 December 2003 to 23 December 2011 the Ministry of Labour and Social Welfare was split between two ministries. The social welfare portfolio was merged with the Ministry of Health and the labour portfolio was merged with the Ministry of Economy.

=== Ministers of Labour and Pension System (2011–2020) ===
Minister	Party	Term start	Term end	Days in office
Mirando Mrsić	SDP	23 December 2011	22 January 2016	1,491
Nada Šikić	HDZ	22 January 2016	19 October 2016	271
Tomislav Ćorić	HDZ	19 October 2016	9 June 2017	233
Marko Pavić	HDZ	9 June 2017	19 July 2019	770
Josip Aladrović	HDZ	19 July 2019	23 July 2020	370

=== Ministers of Labour, Pension System, Family and Social Policy (2020–present) ===
Minister	Party	Term start	Term end	Days in office
Josip Aladrović	HDZ	23 July 2020	29 April 2022	645
Marin Piletić	HDZ	29 April 2022	20 February 2026	1,558
Alen Ružić	HDZ	20 February 2026	Incumbent	165

== Officials ==
Currently serving officials at the Ministry:

=== Minister ===
- Alen Ružić, Minister of Labour, Pension System, Family and Social Policy

=== State Secretaries ===
- Ivan Vidiš
- Marinko Lukenda
- Marija Pletikosa
- Margareta Mađerić

=== Directors of departments ===
- Anita Zirdum, authorized to perform the duties of the Director of the Directorate for Labor and Occupational Safety (ovlaštena za obavljanje poslova ravnateljice Uprave za rad i zaštitu na radu)
- Luka Čirko, Director of the Directorate for the Labor Market and Employment (ravnatelj Uprave za tržište rada i zapošljavanje)
- Melita Čičak, authorized to perform the duties of the Director of the Pension System Directorate (ovlaštena za obavljanje poslova ravnateljice Uprave za mirovinski sustav)
- Vicko Mardešić, authorized to perform the duties of the Director of the Directorate for the Management of EU Operational Programs (ovlašten za obavljanje poslova ravnatelja Uprave za upravljanje operativnim programima EU)
- Nada Zrinušić, authorized to perform the duties of the Director of the Directorate for Programs and Projects (ovlaštena za obavljanje poslova ravnateljice Uprave za programe i projekte)
- Tanja Žaja, Director of the Directorate for Family and Social Policy (ravnateljica Uprave za obitelj i socijalnu politiku)
- Tatjana Katkić Stanić, authorized to perform the duties of the Director of the Institute for Social Work (ovlaštena za obavljanje poslova ravnateljice Zavoda za socijalni rad)
