= Marko Pavić =

Croatian politician (born 1979)

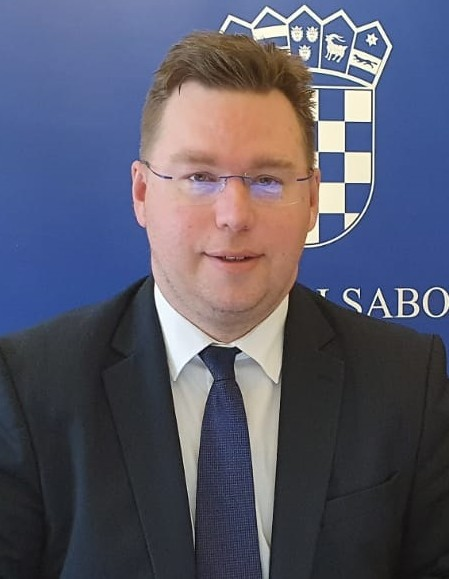
- Pavić in 2021

Member of the Croatian Parliament
- Incumbent
- Assumed office 22 July 2020
- Constituency: District IV (2020–2024); District VI (2024–present)

Minister of Regional Development and EU Funds
- In office 19 July 2019 – 22 July 2020
- Prime Minister: Andrej Plenković
- Preceded by: Gabrijela Žalac
- Succeeded by: Nataša Tramišak

Minister of Labour and Pension System
- In office 9 June 2017 – 19 July 2019
- Prime Minister: Andrej Plenković
- Preceded by: Tomislav Ćorić
- Succeeded by: Josip Aladrović

Personal details
- Born: 18 June 1979 (age 46)
- Party: Croatian Democratic Union

Marko Pavić (born 18 June 1979) is a Croatian politician serving as a member of the Croatian Parliament since 2020. From 2017 to 2019, he served as minister of labour and pension system. From 2019 to 2020, he served as minister of regional development and EU funds.
