= Anamarija Blažević =

Croatian politician (born 1979)

Member of the Croatian Parliament
- Incumbent
- Assumed office 2020
- Constituency: Electoral district V

Personal details
- Born: 18 August 1979 (age 46)
- Party: Croatian Democratic Union

Anamarija Blažević (born 18 August 1979) is a Croatian politician from the Croatian Democratic Union who has served as a member of the Croatian Parliament since the 2020 election. She was elected mayor of Pakrac in 2017.

== See also ==
- List of members of the Sabor, 2020–2024
