= Nataša Mikuš Žigman =

Croatian politician (born 1971)

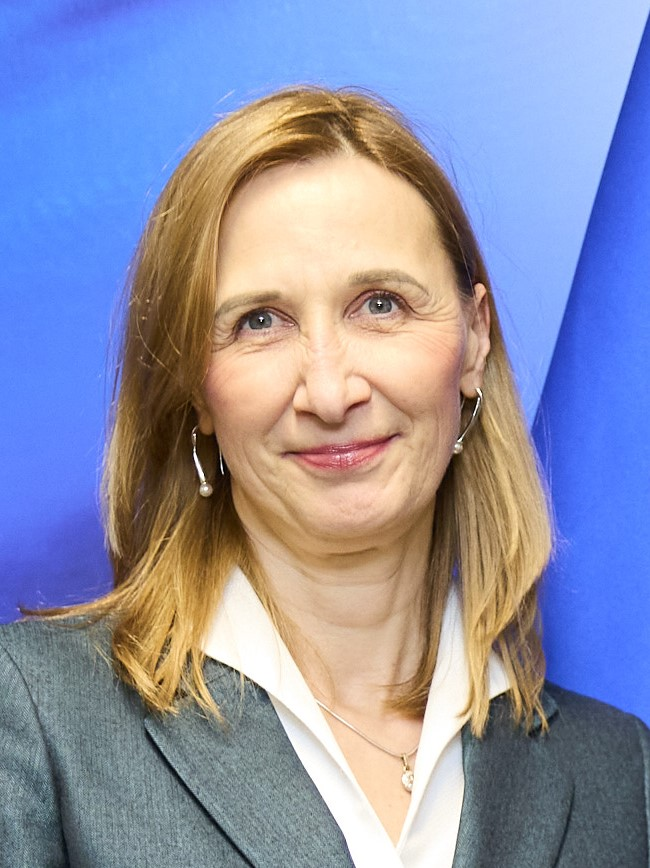

Minister of Regional Development and EU Funds
- Incumbent
- Assumed office 15 July 2025
- Prime Minister: Andrej Plenković
- Preceded by: Šime Erlić

Personal details
- Born: 16 July 1971 (age 54) Zagreb, SR Croatia, SFR Yugoslavia (modern Croatia)

Nataša Mikuš Žigman (born 16 July 1971) is a Croatian politician who has been serving as minister of regional development and EU funds since 15 July 2025. From 2023 to 2025, she served as director of business sustainability and green transformation at Podravka. From 2020 to 2022, she served as state secretary of the Ministry of Economy and Sustainable Development. From 2016 to 2020, she served as state secretary of the Ministry of Entrepreneurship and Crafts. From 2012 to 2016, she served as head of the Central Finance and Contracting Agency for European Union Programmes and Projects.
