= Mirando Mrsić =

Croatian physician and politician

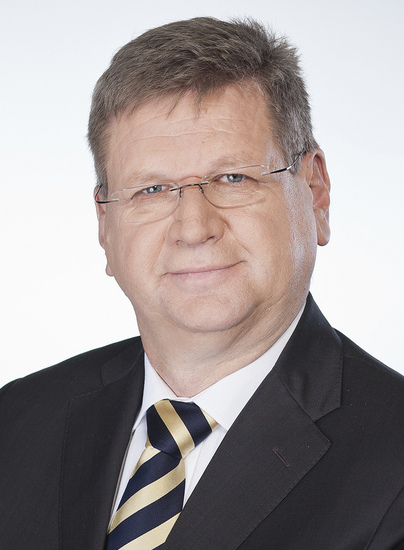

Minister of Labour and Pension System
- In office 23 December 2011 – 22 January 2016
- Prime Minister: Zoran Milanović
- Preceded by: Ministry created
- Succeeded by: Nada Šikić

Personal details
- Born: 14 October 1959 (age 66) Split, PR Croatia, FPR Yugoslavia
- Party: Social Democratic Party (-2018, 2022-present); The Democrats (2018-2022)
- Education: University of Zagreb

Mirando Mrsić (born 14 October 1959) is a Croatian physician and politician who served as a Minister of Labour and Pension System in the centre left Government of Zoran Milanović from 23 December 2011 until 22 January 2016.

Mrsić was born in Split on 14 October 1959. After finishing elementary and high school in Makarska, he enrolled at the Zagreb School of Medicine from which he graduated in 1983. He received Ph.D. in biomedical sciences in 2000. Mrsić specialized in hematology.

He was the campaign manager of the successful 2009-10 presidential campaign of Ivo Josipović.

Mrsić was expelled from the Social Democratic Party in March 2018. In October 2018, he founded a new political party, the Democrats (Croatian: Demokrati). He returned to the SDP in April 2022.
