= Abdulah Skaka =

Bosnian politician (born 1983)

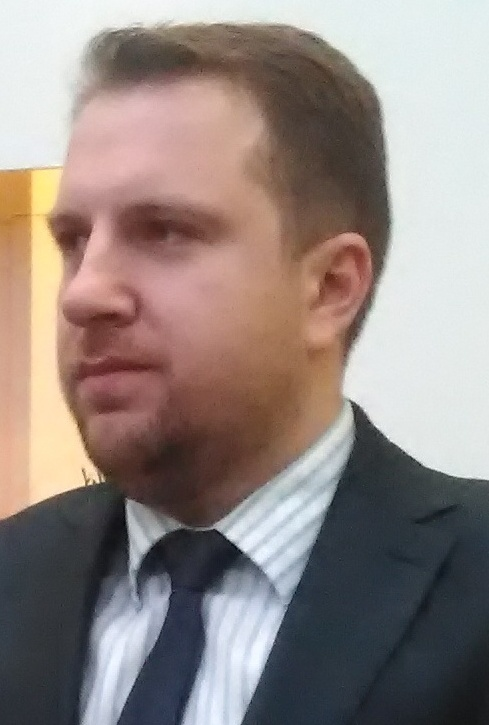
- Skaka in 2017

38th Mayor of Sarajevo
- In office 6 February 2017 – 8 April 2021
- Preceded by: Ivo Komšić
- Succeeded by: Benjamina Karić

Personal details
- Born: 5 December 1983 (age 42) Sarajevo, SR Bosnia and Herzegovina, SFR Yugoslavia
- Party: Party of Democratic Action (2013–present)
- Education: University of Travnik (BEc); University of Sarajevo (BA, MEc)
- Profession: Politician and economist

Abdulah Skaka (born 5 December 1983) is a Bosnian politician and economist who served as the 38th mayor of Sarajevo from 2017 to 2021. He has been a member of the Party of Democratic Action since 2013.

== Early and personal life ==
Skaka was born on 5 December 1983 in Sarajevo, SR Bosnia and Herzegovina, SFR Yugoslavia, the oldest of six children to Dr. Uzeir Skaka (died 2015) and Amra. His paternal grandfather, also named Abdulah, was a co-founder of the Party of Democratic Action in 1990.

The Skaka family first arrived to Sarajevo around 1665, when his ancestor opened the cities first barber shop in the Stari Grad municipality.

Since 2009, he has worked as the general manager of SKY Media company in Sarajevo. Skaka lives in Stari Grad with his wife and two children.

== Political career ==
Skaka joined the Party of Democratic Action in 2013 and was elected by 16 out of the 28 members of the Sarajevo City Council to become the 38th mayor of the city on 6 February 2017, replacing Ivo Komšić. Skaka's major achievements include the reconstruction and reopening of the Sarajevo cable car in April 2018 and hosting the European Youth Olympic Winter Festival alongside East Sarajevo in February 2019. Following the 2020 municipal elections, on 8 April 2021, Skaka was succeeded by Benjamina Karić as mayor of Sarajevo.

== Controversies ==
Skaka claimed to have graduated from the School of Economics and Business at the University of Sarajevo in 2011, although in October 2018 it was found that he actually attended the University of Travnik. He also been criticized for his lack of knowledge of regional politics and politicians, such as once claiming on television that Bosnian politician Stjepan Kljuić was the former Croatian president Stjepan Mesić, apparently confusing the two.

On 28 February 2020, it was revealed in a leaked recording that Skaka's election for Sarajevo mayor was not legitimate and that decisive votes had been bought. Publishing of the leaked recording resulted in a series of calls for his resignation or suspension, including petition by citizens, several calls for resignation or suspension by politicians or political parties present in the Sarajevo City Council, and by intellectuals. After all these charges however, the City Council refused to dismiss him.

On 23 May 2023, Skaka was detained for questioning and then arrested on suspicion of abuse of office during his term as mayor.

Political offices
Preceded by Ivo Komšić	Mayor of Sarajevo; 2017–2021	Succeeded by Benjamina Karić
