= Josip Dabro =

Croatian politician (born 1983)

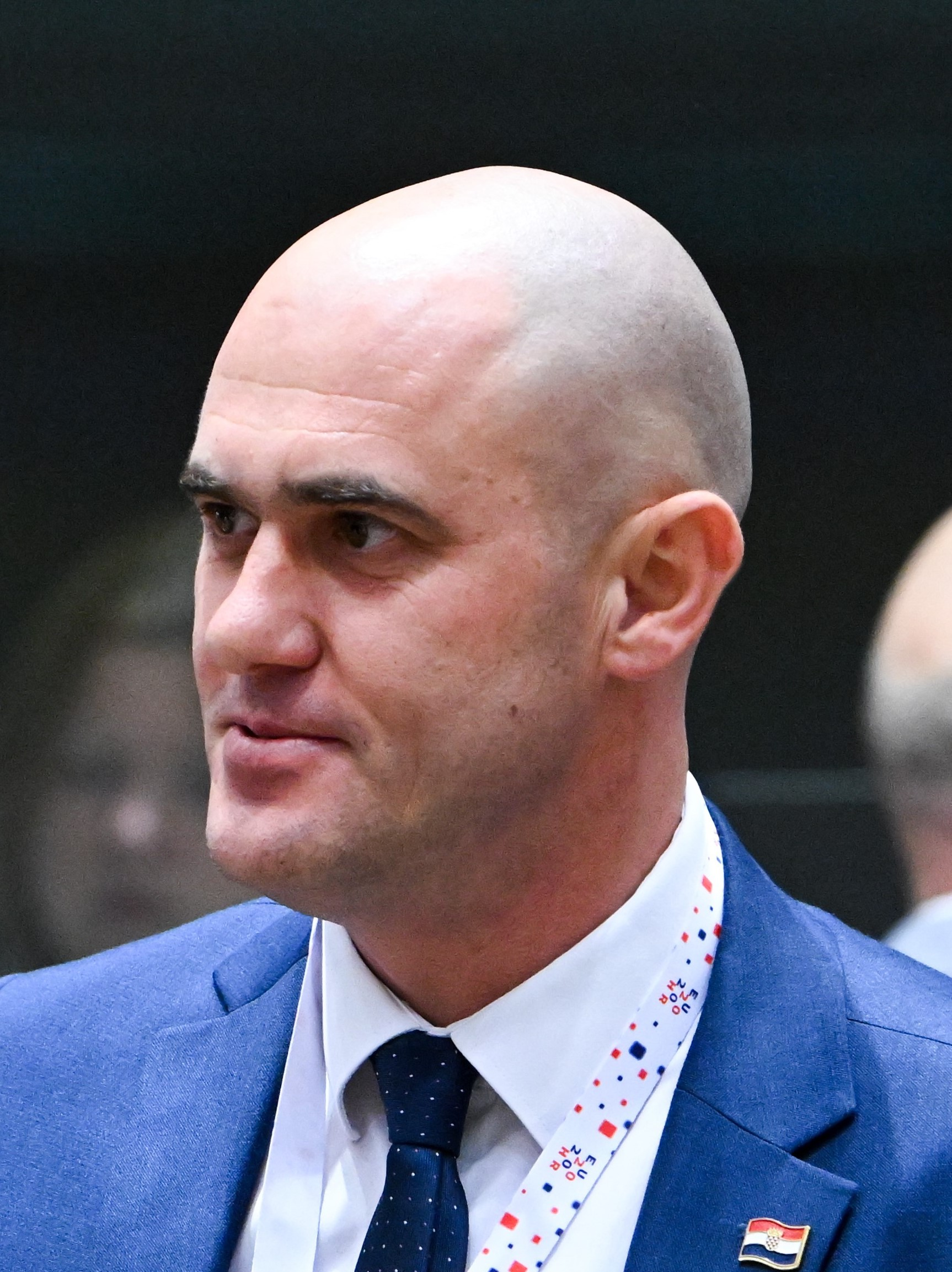
- Dabro in 2024

Deputy Prime Minister of Croatia
- In office 17 May 2024 – 18 January 2025
- Prime Minister: Andrej Plenković
- Preceded by: Anja Šimpraga
- Succeeded by: David Vlajčić

Minister of Agriculture
- In office 17 May 2024 – 18 January 2025
- Prime Minister: Andrej Plenković
- Preceded by: Marija Vučković
- Succeeded by: Tugomir Majdak (Acting); David Vlajčić

Personal details
- Born: 5 January 1983 (age 43) Belgrade, SR Serbia, SFR Yugoslavia
- Party: DP (since 2021)
- Other political affiliations: HDZ (1999–2021)
- Education: University of Zagreb; University of Travnik

Josip Dabro (born 5 January 1983) is a Croatian politician who served as Minister of Agriculture and as a Deputy Prime Minister from 2024 to 2025. From 16 to 17 May 2024, he was a member of the Croatian Parliament. From 2023 to 2026 he served as secretary general of the far-right Homeland Movement. Dabro resigned from his position as minister after a video of him shooting a gun nine times out the car window leaked to the press.

== Personal life ==
His mother hails from the Croatian Serb minority.
