= Tomislav Tolušić =

Croatian politician (born 1979)

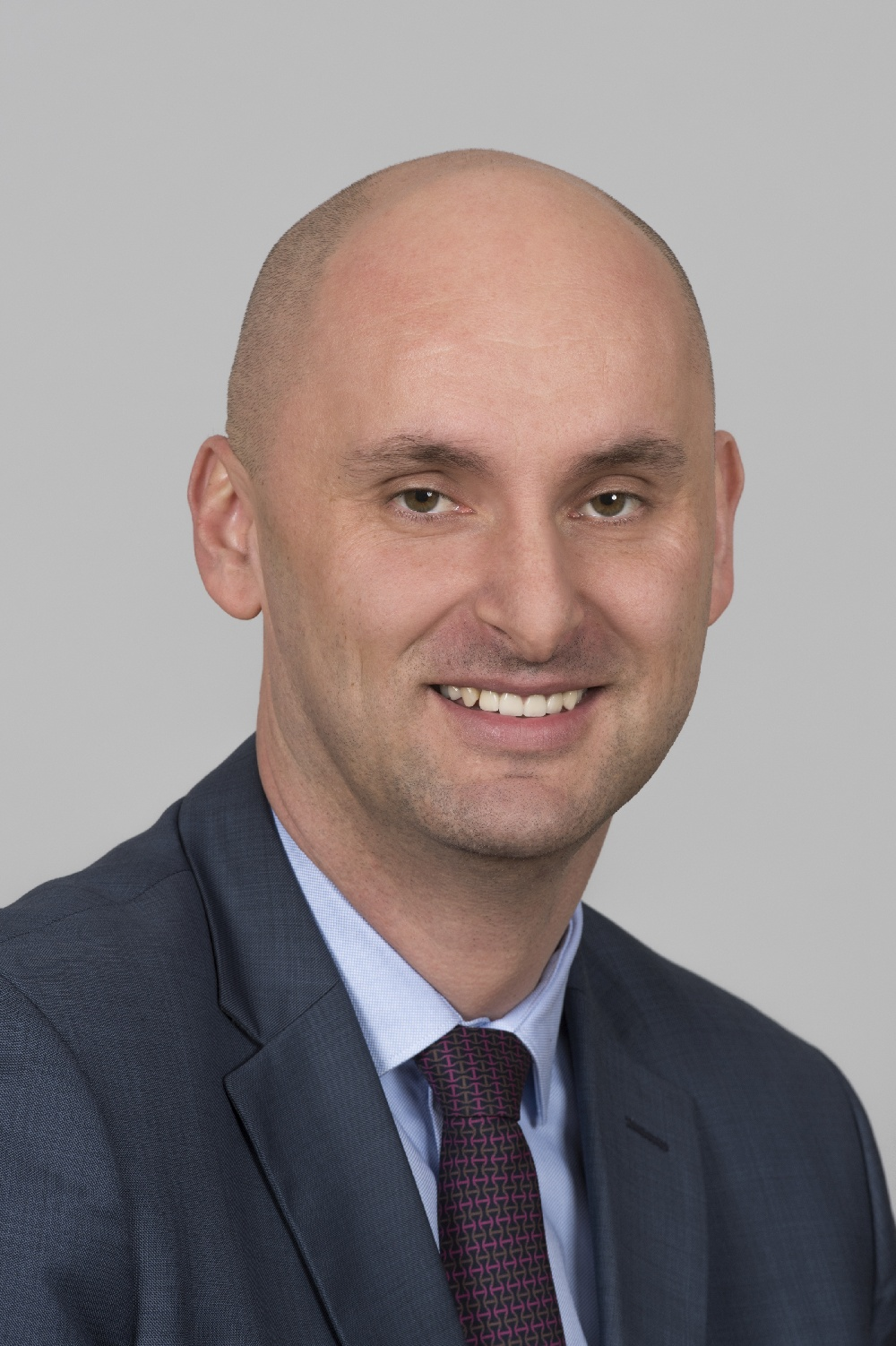
- Tolušić in January 2016

Deputy Prime Minister of Croatia
- In office 25 May 2018 – 17 July 2019
- Prime Minister: Andrej Plenković
- Preceded by: Martina Dalić
- Succeeded by: Zdravko Marić

Minister of Agriculture
- In office 19 October 2016 – 17 July 2019
- Prime Minister: Andrej Plenković
- Preceded by: Davor Romić
- Succeeded by: Marija Vučković

Minister of Regional Development and EU Funds
- In office 22 January 2016 – 19 October 2016
- Prime Minister: Tihomir Orešković; Andrej Plenković
- Preceded by: Branko Grčić
- Succeeded by: Gabrijela Žalac

Prefect of the Virovitica-Podravina County
- In office 19 March 2008 – 2016
- Preceded by: Stjepan Feketić
- Succeeded by: Igor Andrović

Personal details
- Born: 12 February 1979 (age 47) Virovitica, SR Croatia, SFR Yugoslavia
- Party: Croatian Democratic Union (1997–present)
- Education: University of Zagreb

Tomislav Tolušić (born 12 February 1979) is a Croatian politician who last worked as the 14th Minister of Agriculture since 19 October 2016 and Deputy Prime Minister for the Economy. He had previously served as Prefect of the Virovitica-Podravina County between 2008 and 2016 and 4th Minister of Regional Development and EU Funds during 2016.

== Early life and education ==
Tomislav Tolušić was born on 12 February 1979 in Virovitica. After finishing elementary and high school in his hometown, he enrolled in Zagreb Faculty of Law from which he graduated in 2003. In 2010, he enrolled in the postgraduate specialist study "Local Democracy and Development" at the Zagreb Faculty of Political Science.

== Career ==
Tomislav Tolušić gained his first working experience as a trainee in property and legal affairs services of the State Administration Office of Virovitica-Podravina County where he worked between 2003 and 2004. Between 2004 and 2006 he worked as an associate for public relations and protocol in the office of the mayor of Virovitica, and between 2006 and 2008 as an expert associate for property and legal and administrative affairs in the Administrative Department for Economy and Development of the City of Virovitica. On 19 March 2008, Tolušić was elected prefect of the Virovitica-Podravina County at the extraordinary session of the county assembly following the sudden resignation of prefect Stjepan Feketić. He was elected prefect at both 2009 and 2013 local elections. Between 2013 and 2015, he served as the president of the Croatian County Association. Following 2015 parliamentary elections, Tolušić was appointed Minister of Regional Development and EU Funds in the Cabinet of Tihomir Orešković, and after 2016 extraordinary parliamentary elections, Minister of Agriculture in the Cabinet of Andrej Plenković.

Tolušić has been the member of the center-right Croatian Democratic Union party since 1997.

== Controversy ==
In 2011, court-appointed expert Boro Milivojević sued Tolušić for insult and defamation. The court ruled that there wasn't defamation, but that there was insulting, and ordered Tolušić to pay Milivojević compensation. Milivojević stated that he would have given up the lawsuit had he received an apology and later donated the money he received to the charity. The cause of the lawsuit was that Tolušić, using a nickname "Roks", wrote on Virovitica.net news portal a comment in which he called Milivojević "ordinary thief" who "allegedly takes the bribe", alluding that Milivojević intentionally wrongly assessed the value of three apartments owned by the Virovitica General Hospital used by physicians that were intended for sale and took a bribe for that. He also called Milivojević "member of the red gang" alluding to his membership in the center-left Social Democratic Party of Croatia. Tolušić also commented on the work of his own party as well as himself, using comments such as "Well done prefect!"

== Personal life ==
Tolušić was married twice. He has two daughters, Tena (born 2009) and Jana (born 2011) from the first marriage, and a son Roko (born 2017) from the second.

Political offices
Preceded by Davor Romić	Minister of Agriculture; 2016–2019	Succeeded by Marija Vučković
