= Predrag Puharić =

Mayor of Sarajevo from 2024 to 2025

Predrag Puharić Предраг Пухарић
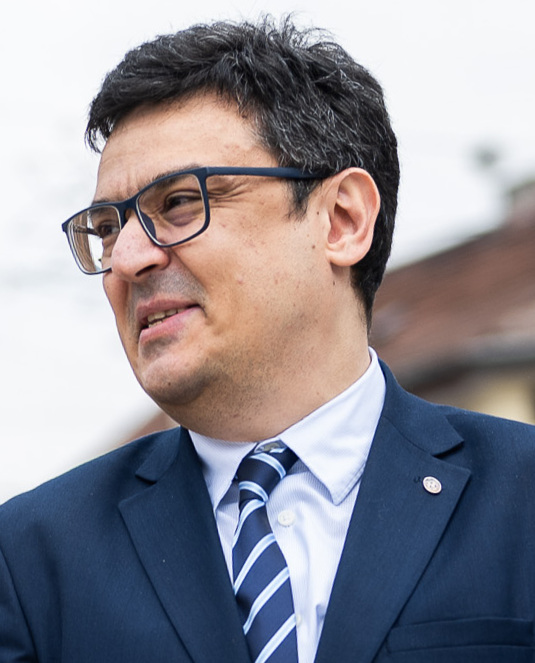
- Puharić in 2025

Deputy Mayor of Sarajevo
- Incumbent
- Assumed office 16 July 2025
- Mayor: Samir Avdić

40th Mayor of Sarajevo
- In office 29 November 2024 – 16 July 2025
- Preceded by: Benjamina Karić
- Succeeded by: Samir Avdić

Personal details
- Born: 1977 (age 48–49) Sarajevo, SR Bosnia and Herzegovina, SFR Yugoslavia
- Party: Social Democratic Party
- Spouse: Dragana Puharić
- Children: 1
- Education: University of Sarajevo

Predrag Puharić (Serbo-Croatian Cyrillic: Предраг Пухарић; born 1977) is a Bosnian computer security expert and politician who served as the 40th mayor of Sarajevo from 2024 to 2025. He has been serving as the deputy mayor of Sarajevo since July 2025. Puharić is a member of the Social Democratic Party.

== Early life and education ==
Puharić was born in 1977 in Sarajevo, SFR Yugoslavia, present-day Bosnia and Herzegovina. He graduated from the University of Sarajevo's Faculty of Criminalistics, Criminology and Security Studies. He was a Chevening Cyber Security Fellow at Cranfield University, and a CRDF International Cybersecurity Fellow at Purdue University. He was the State Department's IVLP participant as well.

Puharić has worked for years in the IT sector, specialising in cybersecurity.

== Political career ==
In November 2024, the Social Democratic Party nominated Puharić for the office of mayor of Sarajevo following his predecessor Benjamina Karić getting elected municipal mayor of Novo Sarajevo a month prior in the 2024 municipal elections. The Sarajevo City Council appointed him as mayor on 29 November until the formation of a new City Council and the appointment of a new mayor. Following lengthy coalition negotiations, the People and Justice party member Samir Avdić was elected mayor by the City Council on 16 July 2025. Puharić was ultimately appointed as the deputy mayor, serving alongside Mirela Džehverović.

== Personal life ==
Predrag is married to Dragana Puharić and together they have a son. They live in Sarajevo.

Political offices
Preceded by Benjamina Karić	Mayor of Sarajevo; 2024–2025	Succeeded by Samir Avdić
