= Marin Piletić =

Croatian politician (born 1983)

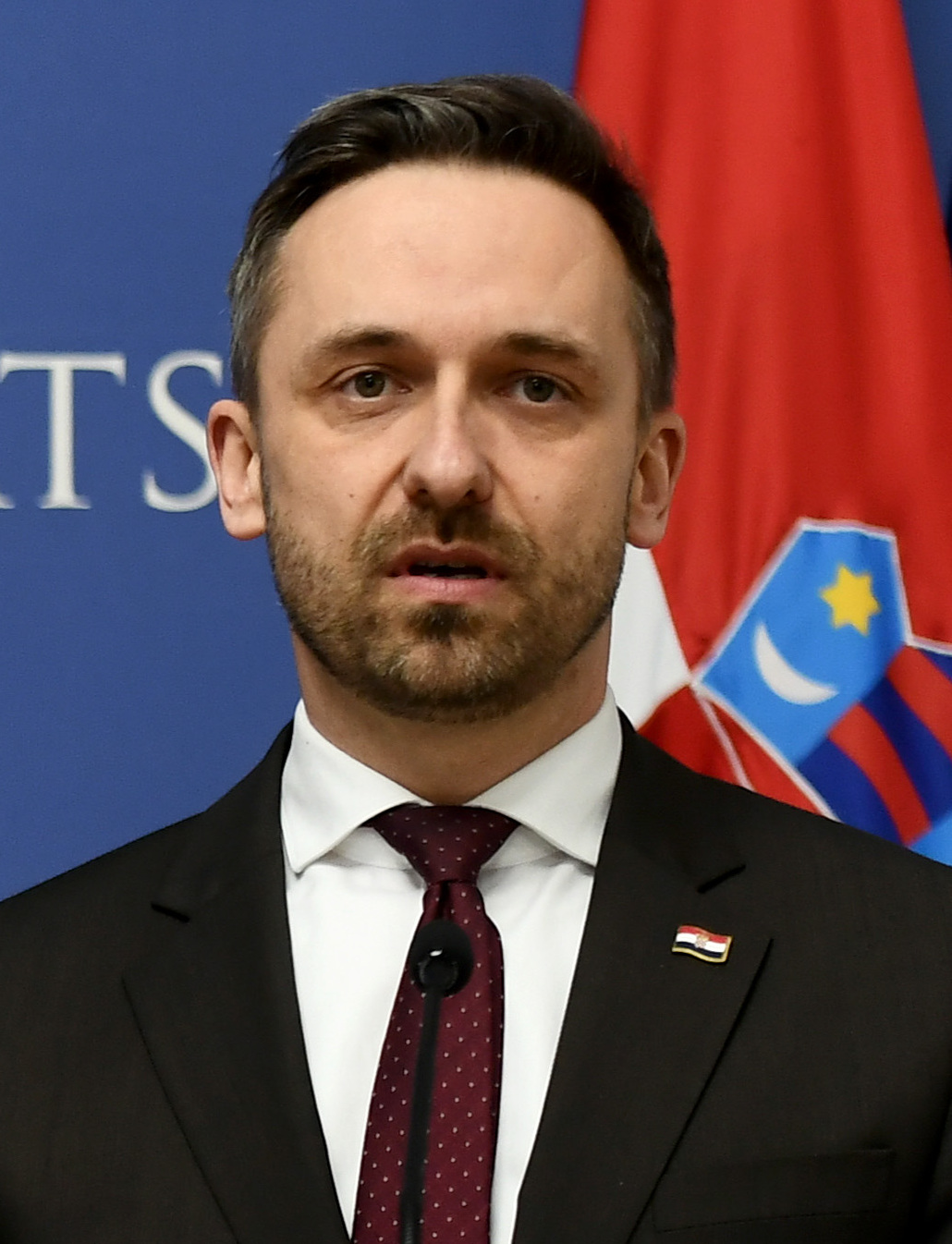
- Piletić in 2023

Minister of Labour, Pension System, Family and Social Policy
- In office 29 April 2022 – 20 February 2026
- Prime Minister: Andrej Plenković
- Preceded by: Josip Aladrović
- Succeeded by: Alen Ružić

Member of the Croatian Parliament for the 5th electoral district
- In office 18 June 2021 – 29 April 2022
- Incumbent
- Assumed office 16 May 2024

Personal details
- Born: 12 January 1983 (age 43) Novska, SR Croatia, SFR Yugoslavia
- Party: Croatian Democratic Union
- Education: University of Zagreb

Marin Piletić (born 12 January 1983) is a Croatian politician who has served as the Minister of Labour, Pension System, Family and Social Policy from 2022 to 2026, when he resigned.

== Early life and education ==
Piletić was born in Novska, on 12 January 1983. He graduated from the Zagreb Faculty of Philosophy, where he had majored in Croatian language and literature, and history.

== Political career ==
Piletić worked as an elementary school teacher prior to his engagement in politics. In the 2009 local elections, he was elected as Deputy Mayor of Novska, a function he held until 2013. From 2014 to 2017, he was Deputy Prefect of Sisak-Moslavina County. He had the function of Mayor of Novska from 2017 to 2021. In the 2021 parliamentary election, Piletić lead the HDZ's list for the 5th electoral district, and would go on to win a seat in the Croatian Parliament together with six more members of the list.

He was appointed Minister of Labour and Pension System, Family and Social Policy on 29 April 2022 in the Government of Andrej Plenković. He subsequently resigned from parliament.
