= Petar Mlinarić =

Croatian politician

Petar Mlinarić (born 24 February 1944 near Bihać) is a Croatian politician from the Croatian Democratic Union party.

Mlinarić was a member of the Croatian Parliament between 2003 and 2008.

He was once a deputy mayor of the city of Vukovar.
