= Josip Aladrović =

Croatian politician (born 1985)

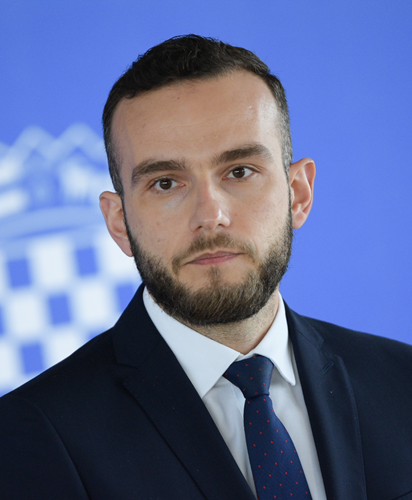
- Aladrović in 2021

Minister of Labour, Pension System, Family and Social Policy
- In office 23 July 2020 – 29 April 2022
- Prime Minister: Andrej Plenković
- Preceded by: Himself
- Succeeded by: Marin Piletić

Minister of Labour and Pension System
- In office 22 July 2019 – 23 July 2020
- Prime Minister: Andrej Plenković
- Preceded by: Marko Pavić
- Succeeded by: Himself

Personal details
- Born: 10 March 1985 (age 41) Pleternica, SR Croatia, SFR Yugoslavia
- Party: Croatian Democratic Union
- Education: University of Zagreb

Josip Aladrović (born 10 March 1985) is a Croatian politician who served as Minister of Labour, Pension System, Family and Social Policy from 2019 to 2022.

== Early life and education ==
Aladrović was born in Pleternica on 10 March 1985. He is the son of Marijan Aladrović, the former Župan of Požega-Slavonia County, today the president of the Pleternica City Council. Aladrović finished high school in Požega and studied at the Faculty of Economics and Business in Zagreb.

== Career ==
Aladrović has worked at Croatia osiguranje. In 2017, he became the head of the Croatian Pension Insurance Institute.

He was appointed Minister of Labour and Pension System on 22 July 2019 in the First Government of Andrej Plenković. He became Minister of Labour and Pension System, Family and Social Policy once the two ministries merged on 23 July 2020, during the Second Government of Andrej Plenković. He was succeeded on 29 April 2022 by Marin Piletić when Aladrović was sacked because of cronyism charges.
