= University of Travnik =

Private university in Travnik, Bosnia and Herzegovina

- Univerzitet u Travniku
- Other names: UNT
- Motto: Science to Success
- Established: 2007
- Location: Travnik, Bosnia and Herzegovina; 44°13′36″N 17°39′00″E
- Campus: Aleja Konzula 5, Travnik 72270, Bosnia & Herzegovina
- Language: Bosnian
- Website: www.unt.ba/naslovna/

University of Travnik (Bosnian: Univerzitet u Travniku, UNT) is a private university located in Travnik, Bosnia and Herzegovina. The university was established in 2007. The motto of the university is— "Science to Success".

== Courses ==
The university offers both undergraduate and post-graduate courses. Some of the courses offered by the university are—

- Law and legal science related courses at the University of Travnik Faculty of Law for the I, II and III cycles of study
- General Management
- Management in the Banking and Insurance
- Tourism and Hospitality
- Pharmaceutical direction
- Dental medicine direction
- Radiological direction
- General medical direction - Medical nursing
- Teacher training
- Bosanski / Hrvastki / Serbian Language and Literature
- Class teaching and Bosnian / Hrvastki / Serbian Language and Literature
- Mathematics and Computer Science
- Pre-school education
- Pedagogy and Psychology
- The general kinesiology
- Specific Applications
- Sports - coaching
- Sports Management
- Graphic design
- Graphic Engineering
- Multimedia Engineering
