= Cabinet of Zoran Milanović =

Croatian government (2011–2016)

Milanović cabinet
- 12th Cabinet of the Republic of Croatia
- 2011–2016
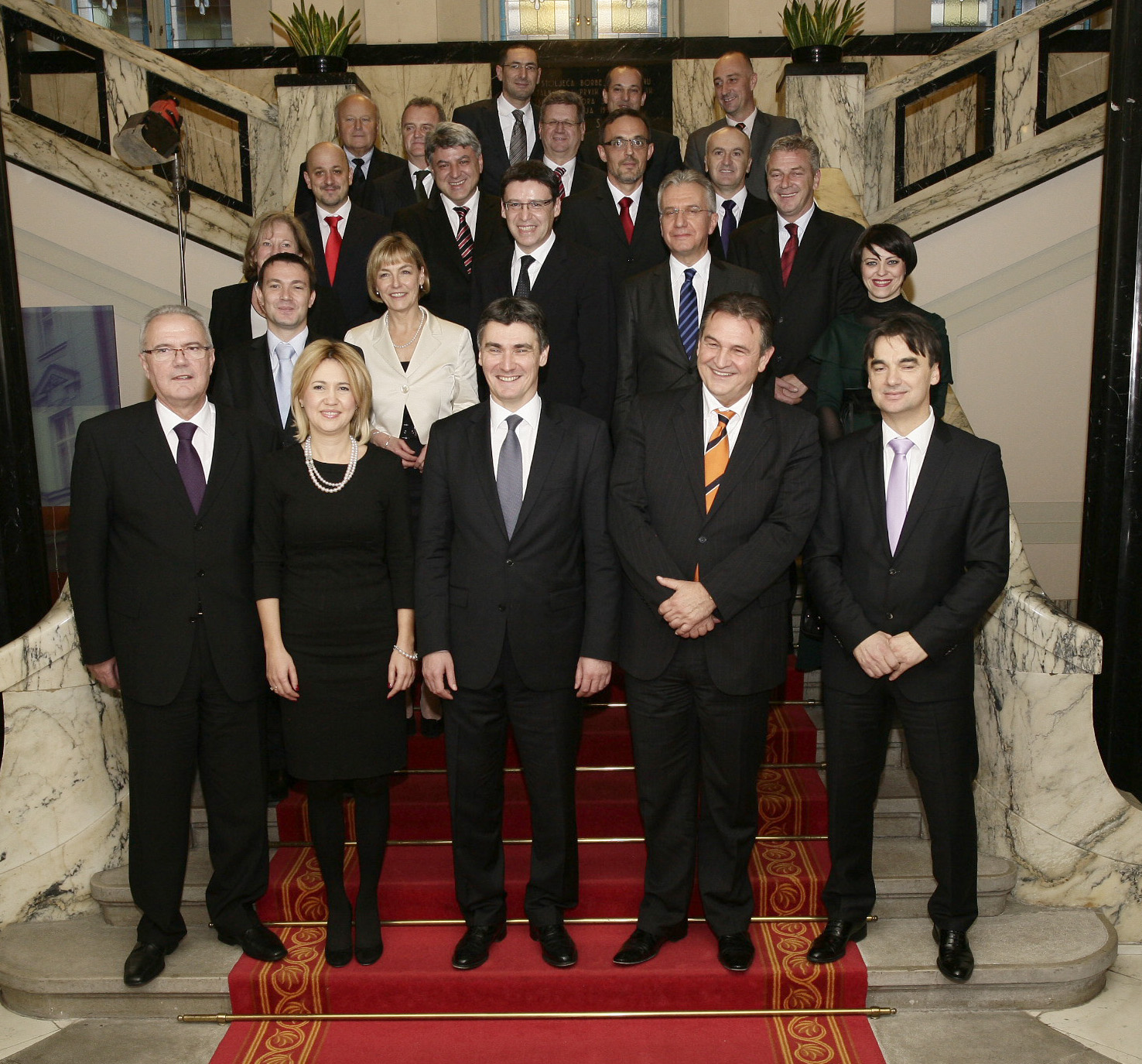
- Date formed: 23 December 2011
- Date dissolved: 22 January 2016

People and organisations
- Head of state: Ivo Josipović (2011–2015); Kolinda Grabar-Kitarović (2015–2016)
- Head of government: Zoran Milanović
- Deputy head of government: Radimir Čačić (2011–2012); Neven Mimica (2011–2013); Branko Grčić; Milanka Opačić; Vesna Pusić (2012–2016); Ranko Ostojić (2013–2016)
- No. of ministers: 21 (on 22 January 2016)
- Ministers removed: 9
- Total no. of members: 30 (including former members)
- Member party: Social Democratic Party of Croatia (SDP); Croatian People's Party – Liberal Democrats (HNS); Istrian Democratic Assembly (IDS) with support from HSU and SDSS
- Status in legislature: Majority coalition government
- Opposition party: Croatian Democratic Union
- Opposition leader: Jadranka Kosor (2011–2012); Tomislav Karamarko (2012–2016)

History
- Election: 2011 election
- Legislature terms: 2011–2015
- Predecessor: Cabinet of Jadranka Kosor
- Successor: Cabinet of Tihomir Orešković

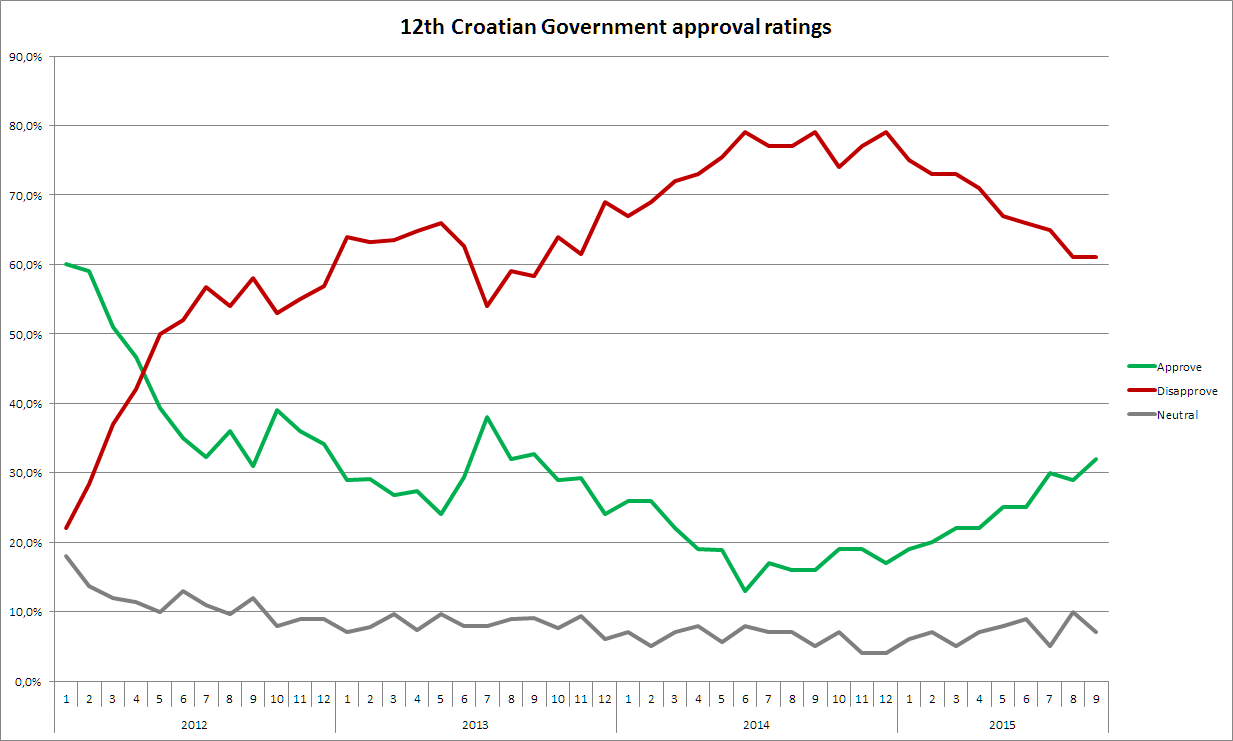
The cabinet's joint monthly approval rating since taking office

The Twelfth Government of the Republic of Croatia (Croatian: Dvanaesta Vlada Republike Hrvatske) was the Croatian Government cabinet led by Prime Minister Zoran Milanović. It was in office from 23 December 2011 until 22 January 2016. It was formed following the November 2011 election won by the centre-left Kukuriku coalition.

By taking office at the age of 45, Zoran Milanović became the second-youngest Prime Minister since Croatia's independence. In addition, his cabinet was also the youngest cabinet in the same period, with an average age of 48. It was surpassed by the succeeding cabinet of Tihomir Orešković, with an average age of 46.

Cabinet members came from three out of the four parties of the winning coalition, leaving only the single-issue Croatian Party of Pensioners (HSU) without representation:

- Social Democratic Party of Croatia (SDP)
- Croatian People's Party (HNS)
- Istrian Democratic Assembly (IDS)

The Milanović cabinet endured a major change when the first deputy prime minister Radimir Čačić resigned in November 2012 following his vehicular manslaughter conviction in Hungary. Also, Milanović's government underwent the most cabinet changes of any Croatian government to date. Namely, nine ministers in total were replaced before the cabinet's term of office expired in January 2016.

== Motions of confidence ==
Vote on the confirmation of the 12th Government of the Republic of Croatia
Ballot	23 December 2011	
Absentees	22 / 151	
Required majority	76 Yes votes out of 151 votes (Absolute majority of the total number of Members of Parliament)	
Yes	89 / 151	check
No	28 / 151	
Abstentions	12 / 151	

== Changes from the preceding cabinet ==
The number of ministries rose to 20, up from 16 in the preceding centre-right Cabinet of Jadranka Kosor. None of the previous ministers retained their position, and several ministries were renamed or had their portfolios reorganized:

- The former Ministry of Economy, Labour and Entrepreneurship (MINGORP) was renamed Ministry of Economy, headed by Radimir Čačić. Labour and entrepreneurship portfolios were taken over by two other newly established ministries.
- The Ministry of Labour and Pension System was created, taking over the labour portfolio from MINGORP.
- The Ministry of Entrepreneurship and Crafts was created, taking over the entrepreneurship portfolio from MINGORP.
- The former Ministry of Health and Social Welfare (MZSS) was renamed Ministry of Health, dropping the social welfare portfolio.
- The former Ministry of Family, Veterans' Affairs and Intergenerational Solidarity (MOBMS) was renamed Ministry of Social Welfare and Youth, dropping the veterans' affairs portfolio and taking over the social welfare portfolio from the former MZSS.
- The Ministry for Veterans' Affairs was created, taking over the portfolio from the former MOMBS.
- The former Ministry of Environmental Protection, Physical Planning and Construction (MZOPU) was split into two new ministries - the Ministry of Environmental Protection and Nature and the Ministry of Construction.
- The former Ministry of Foreign Affairs and European Integration (MVPEI) was renamed Ministry of Foreign and European Affairs.
- The former Ministry of Agriculture, Fisheries and Rural Development was renamed Ministry of Agriculture.
- The former Ministry of Regional Development, Forestry and Water Management was renamed Ministry of Regional Development and EU Funds Management.
- In addition, the number of Deputy Prime Ministers fell from six under Jadranka Kosor to four, and the number of Deputy PM's holding no other office in the cabinet was reduced from three to just one.

Only two cabinet members have previously held senior executive posts - from 2000 to 2003 Slavko Linić held the position of Deputy Prime Minister and Radimir Čačić was Minister of Public Works, Construction and Reconstruction, both under Prime Minister Ivica Račan.

== Party breakdown ==
Party breakdown of cabinet ministers:

- Social Democratic Party
13
- Croatian People's Party
4
- Independents
3
- Istrian Democratic Assembly
1

== List of ministers ==
=== History ===
- In December 2011, the Cabinet had one First Deputy Prime Minister (Radimir Čačić) and three Deputy Prime Ministers: for Neven Mimica this was his only post in the Cabinet, while Radimir Čačić, Branko Grčić and Milanka Opačić served as both Deputy Prime Ministers and ministers of their respective portfolios.
- In November 2012, Vesna Pusić replaced Čačić as the First Deputy Prime Minister.

=== Ministers ===
Portfolio	Minister	Took office	Left office	Party
Prime Minister's Office
Prime Minister	Zoran Milanović	23 December 2011	22 January 2016	SDP
First Deputy Prime Minister
Minister of Foreign and European Affairs	Vesna Pusić	23 December 2011	22 January 2016	HNS-LD
Deputy Prime Ministers
Minister of Social Politics and Youth	Milanka Opačić	23 December 2011	22 January 2016	SDP
Minister of Regional Development and EU funds	Branko Grčić	23 December 2011	22 January 2016	SDP
Minister of the Interior	Ranko Ostojić	23 December 2011	22 January 2016	SDP
Ministers
Minister of Finance	Boris Lalovac	14 May 2014	22 January 2016	SDP
Minister of Defence	Ante Kotromanović	23 December 2011	22 January 2016	SDP
Minister of Health	Siniša Varga	11 June 2014	22 January 2016	SDP
Minister of Justice	Orsat Miljenić	23 December 2011	22 January 2016	SDP
Minister of Public Administration	Arsen Bauk	23 December 2011	22 January 2016	SDP
Minister of Economy	Ivan Vrdoljak	16 November 2012	22 January 2016	HNS-LD
Minister of Entrepreneurship and Crafts	Gordan Maras	23 December 2011	22 January 2016	SDP
Minister of Labour and Pension System	Mirando Mrsić	23 December 2011	22 January 2016	SDP
Minister of Maritime Affairs, Transport and Infrastructure	Siniša Hajdaš Dončić	18 April 2012	22 January 2016	SDP
Minister of Science, Education and Sport	Vedran Mornar	11 June 2014	22 January 2016	Independent
Minister of Agriculture	Tihomir Jakovina	23 December 2011	22 January 2016	SDP
Minister of Tourism	Darko Lorencin	19 March 2013	22 January 2016	IDS-DDI
Minister of Environmental and Nature Protection	Mihael Zmajlović	13 June 2012	22 January 2016	SDP
Minister of Construction and Physical Planning	Anka Mrak Taritaš	16 November 2012	22 January 2016	HNS-LD
Minister of Veterans' Affairs	Predrag Matić	23 December 2011	22 January 2016	Independent
Minister of Culture	Berislav Šipuš	24 April 2015	22 January 2016	Independent

=== Former members ===
Minister	Party	Portfolio	Period
Zlatko Komadina	SDP	Minister of Maritime Affairs, Transport and Infrastructure	23 December 2011 – 4 April 2012
Mirela Holy	SDP	Minister of Environmental Protection and Nature	23 December 2011 – 7 June 2012
Radimir Čačić	HNS	Deputy Prime Minister (for Economic Issues); Minister of Economy	23 December 2011 – 14 November 2012
Veljko Ostojić	IDS	Minister of Tourism	23 December 2011 – 9 March 2013
Neven Mimica	SDP	Deputy Prime Minister (for Home, Foreign and European Affairs)	23 December 2011 – 1 July 2013
Slavko Linić	SDP	Minister of Finance	23 December 2011 – 6 May 2014
Rajko Ostojić	SDP	Minister of Health	23 December 2011 – 11 June 2014
Željko Jovanović	SDP	Minister of Science, Education and Sports	23 December 2011 – 11 June 2014
Andrea Zlatar-Violić	HNS	Minister of Culture	23 December 2011 –25 March 2015
