= 2014–2016 Croatian war veterans protest =

Croatian War Veterans Tent Protest Croatian: Prosvjed šatoraša
- Date: October 2014 – April 2016
- Location: Zagreb, Croatia
- Caused by: Veterans' dissatisfaction with government officials
- Goals: Increase of veterans rights; Resignation of Zoran Milanović and Ivo Josipović; Toppling of Milanović government
- Methods: Demonstrations, riots, self-immolation, civil disobedience
- Status: Ended in April 2016

Parties
Veteran protesters: Association 100% za Hrvatsku; Various war veterans; Supported by: Croatian Democratic Union; Authentic Croatian Party of Rights Catholic Church; Bad Blue Boys	Government of Croatia; Ministry of Internal Affairs Supported by: Various anti-tenter Facebook groups

Lead figures
Josip Klemm; Đuro Glogoški	(Croatia) Zoran Milanović (Croatia) Ranko Ostojić (Croatia) Predrag Matić

Casualties
- Death: 1
- Detained: Unknown

2014–2016 Croatian war veterans tent protest was a 555-day war veterans' protest, often dubbed in Croatia as The Tenters (Croatian: šatoraši). The protests were initially aimed against Ministry of Croatian Veterans deputy Bojan Glavašević and Minister Predrag Matić himself, however the protesters subsequently changed their demands and started demanding the resignation of centre-left Prime Minister Zoran Milanović and then President Ivo Josipović. The protests escalated in May 2015 when a group of protesters breached the riot police cordons in Zagreb Upper Town and barricaded themselves inside St. Mark Church, where they again clashed with the police. At the same time another group of protesters near the central tent blocked the traffic and brought out gas bottles on Savska street which they apparently threatened to blow if the police refused to back off from the church. After both Josipović and Milanović lost the elections in 2014 and 2015, the protests gradually calmed down and in April 2016, with the new minister taking over the Veterans Office, the tent was dismantled, formally ending the protest.

== Background ==
The protests started after minister's deputy Bojan Glavašević at a discussion table at the Documenta NGO in Vukovar posed a question during his speech: "How come there are so many cases of PTSD among Croatian war veterans that had won the war, and have many rights, while among ex Serb army members that had lost the war and have no rights, there are no such cases?". These words caused an outrage among war veterans population, whose representatives accused minister and his deputy of reducing the veterans rights, while at the same time they are attempting to grant them to former so-called Krajina army members. Somewhere at the same time, Đuro Glogoški, the president of Association of 100% Disabled War Veterans of Homeland War, was trying to reach a solution for problems of one HVO veteran, but was given the unsatisfactory reaction from the minister in charge, for which he and his group had set up a tent and started a protest in front of the building of Ministry of Croatian Veterans, in Savska street in Zagreb, where they had declared that they would remain, until their problems were resolved. They also asked for the resignation of minister Matić and his close associates Glavašević and Vesna Nađ. Some HDZ officials, as well as Kolinda Grabar-Kitarović herself have supported the protesters, despite the fact that the group of protesters near the central tent blocked the traffic and brought out gas bottles on Savska street which they apparently threatened to blow if the police refused to back off.

== The protest ==
On second day of the protest, a window was broken on the building of the Ministry by throwing a potato at the glass. On the third day of the protest a female veteran invalid got sick during the rally and died shortly after. This caused a further outrage among the protesters. Two days later, on October 24, 2014, prime minister Milanović gave a statement in which he stood by his ministers and accused the protesters of protesting with support of the rival party Croatian Democratic Union. On following days, minister Matić had to be escorted by the police while he was going to work in the ministry. On the same day, the protesters had called out to president Josipović, claiming that "he doesn't care about them". He subsequently came to visit them on the same day, accompanied by minister Matić and then chief-of-staff of the Croatian Armed Forces Drago Lovrić. Josipović urged them to "return back to their homes, so that they don't compromise their health", but to no avail. On the same day, one of the protesters threw a piece of cardboard at Bojan Glavešević's head while Glavašević was going to work. On 28 October 2014, one veteran drove himself by taxi in front of the Savska tent, after which he poured gasoline on himself and set himself on fire.

In December 2014 a man was kicked out of the tent, after one of the protest leaders Ante Deur accused minister Matić of sending the provocateurs into their tent. On December 10, some three thousand war veterans marched through the streets of Zagreb, with signs of crosses on their clothes, by which " they wanted to appeal to the public for more effective measures of preventing the veterans suicide".

During the presidential campaign in 2014 Croatian presidential elections, the protesters warned Croatian citizens that: "they shouldn't vote for one of the candidates at any cost" by which they meant left wing president Ivo Josipović. In January 2015, Ivo Josipović lost the presidential elections to a right-wing candidate Kolinda Grabar-Kitarović which was met with the celebrations in the form of blocking the traffic on the Savska street and fireworks. Shortly afterwards, Kolinda came to the tent to visit the protesters.

During following months several rallies and counter rallies were held:

By February, the tenters statements became increasingly radicalized with their leaders saying to the media, for example: "In 1991 we had a bloody Easter and this year we might have a bloody Christmas" On February 20, 2015, an unemployed young man came to protest against youth unemployment in front of Savska tent by holding a piece of white underwear in his hands and protest signs "I have PTSD from not doing anything", "Either job or Kalashnikov" and "Karamarko go home!". The single protester was soon verbally attacked by the tenters after which six policemen came to arrest him for "disturbing of public peace and quiet"

On February 21, 2015, a counter protest "Stop the Tenters terror" was organised, but the police blocked the protesters way between Savska and Vukovarska street. On the opposing side, some 600 tenters came out to meet the counter protesters accompanied by members of Bad Blue Boys. One counter-protester was arrested after trying to breach the police cordon to reach the Tenters, and one tent supporter was apparently arrested, after he had thrown a rock at the counter-protesters

On March 1, left-wing movement Occupy Croatia announced organising a new counter-protest because veterans in Savska 66: "endorsed the members of ultra-right Authentic Croatian Party of Rights in their tent", who were previously banned by Croatian police from parading on ban Jelačić Square and Ante Starčević's grave. Tent protest leader Glogoški responded by stating that; "Anyone is welcome to their tent" and that they only "greeted the A-HSP members, who came to give them support".

On March 14 Occupy Croatia organised a counter-protest to which only dozens of people came. They then marched towards Savska street, but the riot police blocked their way between Frankopanska and Dalmatinska street. As they were passing through the city, the people who disagreed with them, shouted insults to the counter-protesters. At the same time, between 300 and 400 Tent veterans started marching towards prime minister Mianović's appartement because the tent leaders accused Milanović of being behind the counter-protest. They protested in front of Milanović's apartment for a while before returning to Savska. In same month, by then already former president Josipović wrote a newspaper text in which he claimed that the Tenters way of: "calling for the fall of government on the street has passed the line which a democratic society can and must tolerate" and added on that the problem is not their protest against the government, but the way in which they are doing it, which is "spitting in the face" to a legal and democratic state. He also added that they are "using the electricity and other infrastructure of a state which they are trying to crash"

By April 2014, the tent held a permanent protest sign: "In 1991 against Yugoslavia, in 2014 against Yugoslavs", implying that they were protesting against the alleged Yugoslavs in Croatian society. On April 11, Occupy Croatia organised a new counter-tent protest, and proclaimed that they are protesting against: "self-proclaimed, superpolitical institution tent-town in Savska street 66, which has a genuine task of imposing ultranationalist, and theological values which are against the universal values of equality, justice and liberty". After only 50 people came to their rally the counter-protest was canceled. The organisers then made a statement to the public: "If this is a world in which you want to live in – enjoy!"

=== May escalation ===
In the beginning of May, the tenters announced organising the major rally on Ban Jelačić Square, which gathered some 10 000 people. On this rally The Tenters leader Glogoški gave an ultimatum to the government to resolve their demands before May 30, otherwise "they will go directly to St. Mark's Square (where the government building is located) and someone will be forced to step down". On May 29, prime minister Milanović declared his offer to negotiate with the tenters in Lisinski Concert Hall, which they rejected. After that the tenters broke through the police barricades and reached St. Mark's Square. They then barricaded themselves inside St. Mark's Church, which was surrounded by the riot police. The interior minister issued the warning that they are only allowed to stay there until 10pm, otherwise, "the police will be forced to act" The tenters leader Glogoški called on the riot police at one point "to cancel their obedience and join them", which some Croatian media interpreted and a call on coup d'état. Nevertheless, Glogoški's appeal was unsuccessful. While some HDZ members brought food to the tenters in the church, the party leader Tomislav Karamarko, when asked by the media about the riots on St. Mark's square, said that "they shouldn't treat the veterans as some kind of hooligans". This was considered problematic, as the tenters didn't report their protest to the police, which was a breach of law on public protest. As the night fell, a man climbed onto the church and threatened to jump off if the police didn't back away from the tenters. The man, however, soon climbed back down. At the same time, another group of protesting veterans near the central tent blocked traffic and brought out gas bottles on Savska street, which they apparently threatened to detonate if the police didn't pull away from the church. A little past 10 p.m., a priest came between the tenters inside the church and the riot police surrounding it. At 11 p.m., Glogoški became ill and was transported to the nearby ambulance car, while the tenters clashed with the police once more in entrances to the church. The police ended up allowing the tenters to spend the entire night in the church. Sometime past midnight, a group of young men approached the police, shouting insults at them, interspersed with the nationalist phrase "Za dom spremni!"

The next day, Prime Minister Zoran Milanović held a press conference, saying that although "he is ready for dialogue next week, [...] this [kind of behaviour] must stop". Around 5 p.m., Glogoški gave a statement saying that they "accept Milanović's offer to meet them on next Monday", after which tenters withdrew back to their tent on Savska street.

== End of the protest ==
After Milanović failed to form a new government in the aftermath of the 2015 Croatian parliamentary elections, HDZ and MOST formed a new coalition. Tihomir Orešković became the new prime minister and Tomo Medved became the new veterans minister. The tent was finally removed after the protesters proclaimed that: "they didn't protest to bring some other party to power", but because the heads of institutions "did not do their job despite receiving a salary for it". The protesters then announced that their tent would be relocated to the "Homeland War Museum" in Vukovar. This idea was, however, opposed by Mayor of Vukovar and Vukovar wartime commander Branko Borković.

== Impact ==
Journalists and political analysts claimed that the protest changed Croatia. Croatian journalist Miroslav Filipović, for one, claims that the Savska tent protest: "ushered radicailsm into Croatian politics and society". Croatian political sociologist Dragan Bagić similarly considers that the protest was one of the factors leading to political radicalization in Croatia, with other factors being the 2013 Marriage referendum on definition of marriage and two separate commemoration columns on Vukovar remembrance day in 2014. Political analyst and philosopher Žarko Puhovski pointed to the protest in explaining problems which the Croatian Democratic Union had with radicalism in the aftermath of the 2020 Zagreb shooting and 2022 arrest of a minor armed with molotov cocktails on a protest in front of HDZ's headquarters in Zagreb. Puhovski said that the Croatian Democratic Union's encouragement of radical right in 2014 had turned against them by 2022.
