= Ivan Šipić =

Croatian politician (born 1974)

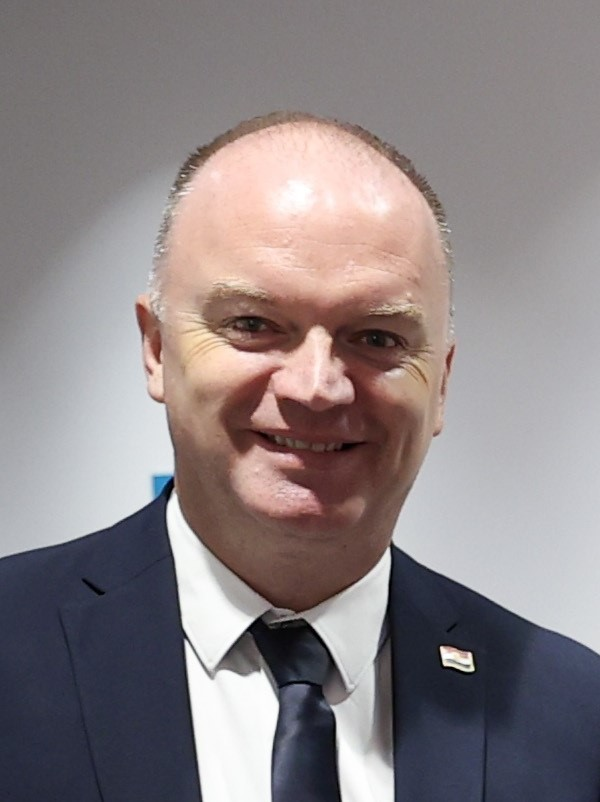
- Šipić in 2024

Minister of Demographics and Immigration
- Incumbent
- Assumed office 17 May 2024
- Prime Minister: Andrej Plenković
- Preceded by: Office established

Member of the Croatian Parliament
- In office 28 December 2015 – 22 July 2020
- Prime Minister: Andrej Plenković; Tihomir Orešković; Zoran Milanović
- Constituency: 9th electoral district

Mayor of Trilj
- In office 2008 – 8 June 2021
- Preceded by: Jozo Sarač
- Succeeded by: Ivan Bugarin

Personal details
- Born: 24 June 1974 (age 52) Sinj, SR Croatia, SFR Yugoslavia (modern Croatia)
- Party: DP (since 2021)
- Other political affiliations: HDZ (2001–2021)
- Education: University of Zagreb

Ivan Šipić (born 24 June 1974) is a Croatian politician serving as minister of demographics and immigration since 2024 and a member of the presidency of the Homeland Movement party. From 2015 to 2020, he was a member of the Croatian Parliament. From 2008 to 2021, he served as mayor of Trilj.

== Early life and education ==
Šipić was born in Sinj in 1974. He graduated from the Catholic Faculty of Theology at the University of Zagreb in 1998.

== Political career ==
Šipić was a long time member of the Croatian Democratic Union and he first entered politics in 2001 when he ran for the Trilj Town Council in the 2001 Croatian local elections and won a seat. He once again won a seat in the town council in the 2005 Croatian local elections and also became deputy mayor. After then mayor Jozo Sarač became State Secretary of the Central State Office for State Property Management, Šipić became mayor of Trilj. He was re-elected as mayor in the 2009, 2013 and 2017 local elections.

In the 2015 Croatian parliamentary election he ran as a candidate of the Patriotic Coalition and won a seat in the Croatian Parliament. While in parliament, he was a member of the Legislation Committee, Judiciary Committee, Elections, Appointments and Administration Committee, Interparliamentary Co-operation Committee and Executive Committee of the National Group to the Inter-Parliamentary Union. The parliamentary term ended early after the government collapsed. From 2016 to 2020 Šipić was a substitute for representative Nediljko Dujić. During this term he was a member of the Committee on the Family, Youth and Sports, Education, Science and Culture Committee, Interparliamentary Co-operation Committee, Executive Committee of the National Group to the Inter-Parliamentary Union, Legislation Committee and Judiciary Committee.

In March 2021 after HDZ picked Ivan Bugarin as the party's candidate for mayor of Trilj, Šipić announced he was leaving the party and ran as an independent candidate. He advanced into the second round but lost to Bugarin by a small margin. However, he won a seat in the Town Council and in 2023 became president of the town council. After losing the mayoral election he joined the Homeland Movement.

In the 2024 Croatian parliamentary election he ran for parliament and won a seat. However, since he was chosen as minister of Demographics and Immigration in the new government, he did not enter parliament and Ive Ćaleta-Car was chosen as his substitute. He officially became minister on 17 May 2024.

In July, he announced the first new demographic measures, which included a doubling of one-time cash benefits for a newborn child from 300 to 600 euros, a mother receiving one year of pension for each child born, an increase in financial compensation during parental leave, a doubling of the duration of paid paternity leave to 20 days, and an increase in the amount of child allowance. In April 2025 he announced that a decision has been made to finance as many as 638 projects for the development and construction of kindergartens and the equipping of playgrounds across Croatia, with a total value of 22.2 million euros.

In May 2025, Šipić caused controversy after saying: "We need to have soldiers and brave warriors, but who will carry the weapons if there are no children? Who will protect our homeland if we don't invest in our families?". This drew criticism from some left-wing members of parliament. Šipić later responded to the criticism by saying: "The statement was partly clumsy, but it was largely taken out of context".
