= Cabinet of Tihomir Orešković =

Croatian government (2016)

Orešković cabinet
- 13th Cabinet of the Republic of Croatia
- 2016
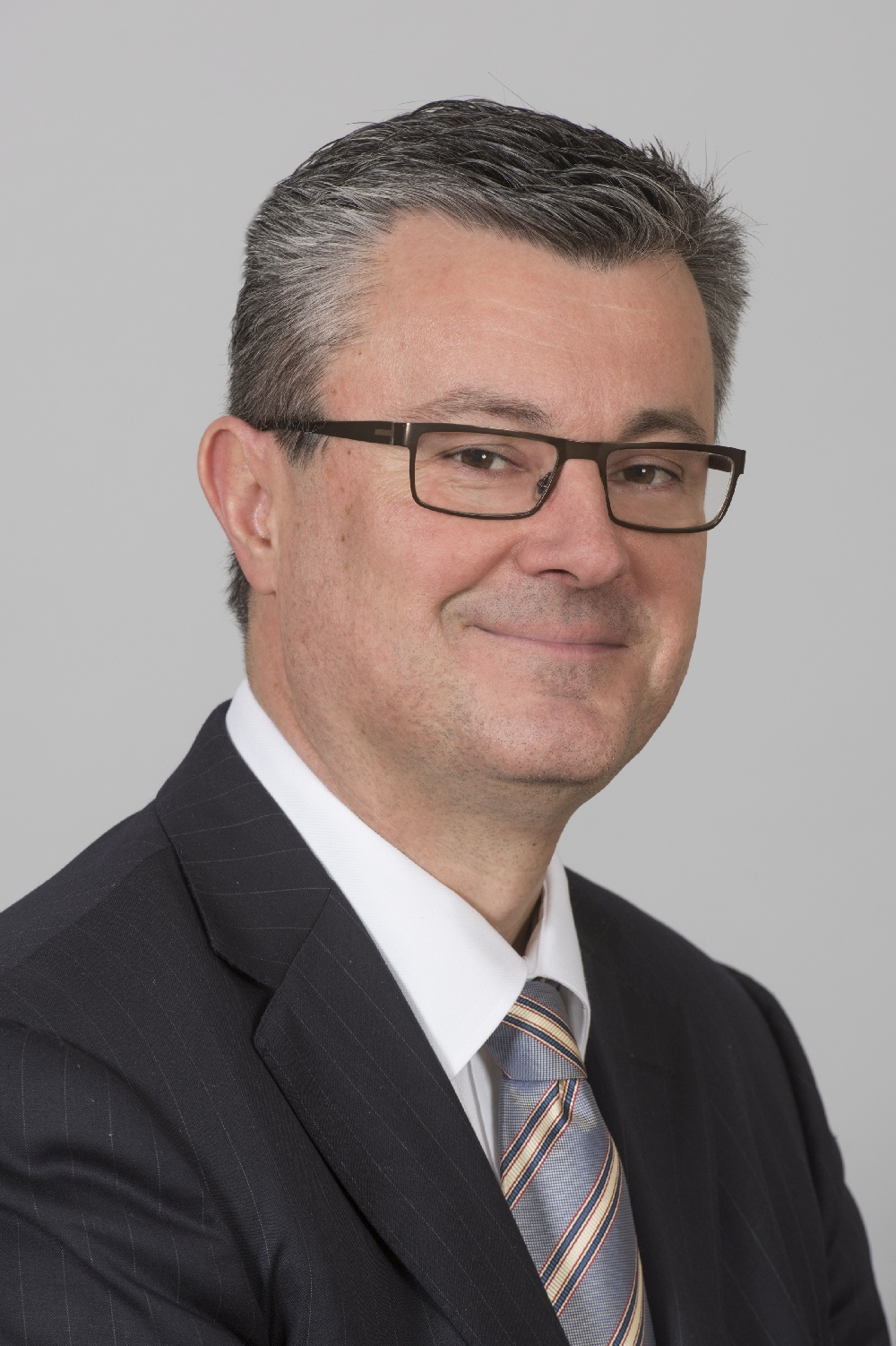
- Date formed: 22 January 2016
- Date dissolved: 19 October 2016

People and organisations
- Head of state: Kolinda Grabar-Kitarović
- Head of government: Tihomir Orešković
- Deputy head of government: Tomislav Karamarko (Jan–Jun 2016); Božo Petrov (Jan–Oct 2016)
- No. of ministers: 21 (on 19 October 2016)
- Ministers removed: 3
- Total no. of members: 24 (including former members)
- Member parties: Croatian Democratic Union (HDZ); Bridge of Independent Lists (MOST)
- Status in legislature: Minority coalition government
- Opposition party: Social Democratic Party
- Opposition leader: Zoran Milanović

History
- Election: 2015 election
- Legislature terms: 2015–2016
- Predecessor: Cabinet of Zoran Milanović
- Successor: Cabinet of Andrej Plenković I

The Thirteenth Government of the Republic of Croatia (Croatian: Trinaesta Vlada Republike Hrvatske) was the Croatian Government cabinet led by Prime Minister Tihomir Orešković. It was the government cabinet of Croatia between 22 January until 19 October 2016. It was formed following the 2015 election. The negotiation process leading to its formation was the longest in Croatian history, totaling at a record 76 days. On 16 June 2016, Orešković's government lost a motion of no confidence in the Parliament with 125 MPs voting for, 15 against and 2 abstaining. As a result, the Orešković cabinet served in an acting capacity until a new government took office after the 2016 election.

It was the first Croatian cabinet to be headed by a non-partisan Prime Minister, as well as having the largest number on non-partisan ministers (5). The remaining cabinet members came from two parties: the Croatian Democratic Union and Bridge of Independent Lists.

The Orešković cabinet was dubbed "Tim's Team" by the Croatian media.

== Motions of confidence ==
Vote on the confirmation of the 13th Government of the Republic of Croatia
Ballot	22 January 2016	
Absentees	2 / 151	
Required majority	76 Yes votes out of 151 votes (Absolute majority of the total number of Members of Parliament)	
Yes	83 / 151	check
No	61 / 151	
Abstentions	5 / 151	

Vote of no confidence in Prime Minister Tihomir Orešković
Ballot	16 June 2016	
Absentees	9 / 151	
Required majority	76 Yes votes, Abstentions or Absentees out of 151 votes (Absolute majority of the total number of Members of Parliament)	
Yes	125 / 151	check
No	15 / 151	
Abstentions	2 / 151	

== History ==
The first change in the cabinet's make-up occurred just 6 days into its term when Minister of Veterans' Affairs Mijo Crnoja resigned on 28 January 2016 over a controversy involving him listing an abandoned wooden structure in Samobor as his place of residence while in reality living in Zagreb. He had done so in order to pay a lower surtax. After holding lengthy meetings behind closed doors during a period of several days, the Prime Minister and his two Deputies agreed to lend their support to Crnoja's case and his claimed innocence in the affair, however Crnoja himself tended his resignation stating that he did not wish to be a burden on the new government. He became the only member of Orešković's cabinet to have never attended a cabinet meeting and also made history as the shortest-ever serving member of a post-independence cabinet in Croatia. After his resignation, Vesna Nađ, who had served as Deputy Minister of Veterans' Affairs in the Cabinet of Zoran Milanović, became interim minister, creating the situation where a member of the opposition centre-left Social Democratic Party held office in a government led by the centre-right. Furthermore, the ministerial post remained vacant for almost two months due to the coalition parties failing to agree on a mutual candidate. At the end of a lengthy negotiation process they finally agreed on Tomo Medved of the HDZ as Crnoja's successor and the new minister.

The first 100 days the cabinet had been marked by constant disagreements and feuds within the ruling Patriotic Coalition-MOST coalition. Namely, many of the smaller parties of the Patriotic Coalition had expressed dissatisfaction with the ineffectiveness of the government, as well as the mutual blocking mechanism present between members of the Patriotic Coalition and MOST, and the increasing rivalry between the chairmen of these parties, Tomislav Karamarko and Božo Petrov. In this way MOST had been accused of presenting an ″opposition within the government″ and was seen as slow to make decisions on mutual proposals because of its inability to reach a consensus among its own members. The pace of promised reforms was also stained and slowed by the feud within the ruling coalition, as well as the Prime Minister's seemingly subordinate status and lack of political authority in comparison to Tomislav Karamarko and to a lesser extent Božo Petrov. In addition, the government had managed to present only a handful of bills to Parliament, due to an inability to reach the required quorum for three weeks, mostly owing to lack of accord between the coalition parties.

On 18 May 2016, the opposition Social Democratic Party initiated a motion of no confidence in Tomislav Karamarko after the Nacional weekly magazine published secret contracts revealing the business-related cooperation of his wife Ana Šarić and Josip Petrović, the special adviser and lobbyist of the MOL Group, a Hungarian oil corporation that gained control of Croatia's national oil company, INA, through a corruption scandal involving former Prime Minister Ivo Sanader in 2009. MOST leader and Deputy Prime Minister Božo Petrov stated on 26 May 2016 that his party would vote in favor of Karamarko's removal from office, thereby raising the possibility of the government falling and this resulting in early elections or the installment of a new parliamentary majority by the opposition. The motion of no confidence in Karamarko was scheduled to take place on June 16, but he instead chose to resign the day before it could occur, following the verdict of the Commission for the Prevention of Conflicts of Interest, which stipulated that Karamarko had indeed been in a conflict of interest when he had, during a meeting of the government cabinet, expressed the opinion that Croatia should exit an arbitration process with MOL. Instead, an HDZ-backed motion of no confidence in the very Prime Minister the party had installed with MOST was held on 16 June 2016, leading to the fall of the entire cabinet by a successful vote of 125 in favor, out of a total of 142 MPs taking part.

== Status in the Sabor ==
The cabinet was a minority government for the entire duration of its term, with the two parties holding representation in the cabinet - the Croatian Democratic Union (HDZ) and Bridge of Independent Lists (Most) - together initially having 64 Members of Parliament (out of 151 in total) and thus being short of an overall majority of 76 MPs by 12 seats. The government thus relied on outside parliamentary support to achieve such a majority. It was provided primarily by the HDZ's junior partners in the Patriotic Coalition (HSP-AS, HSLS, HSS, HRAST, HDS and BUZ), but also by a number of independents, national minority Members of Parliament and those representing other smaller parties (HDSSB, BM 365 and NS-R).

Parliamentary seats held by parties in government only (22 January 2016):

↓
50	14	87
Croatian Democratic Union	Bridge of Independent Lists	Non-cabinet parties and independent lists

== Party breakdown ==
Party breakdown of cabinet ministers:

- Croatian Democratic Union
13
- Independents
6
- Bridge of Independent Lists
2

== List of ministers ==
Portfolio	Minister	Took office	Left office	Party
Prime Minister's Office
Prime Minister	Tihomir Orešković	22 January 2016	19 October 2016	Independent
Ministers
Minister of Foreign and European Affairs	Miro Kovač	22 January 2016	19 October 2016	HDZ
Minister of Social Politics and Youth	Bernardica Juretić	22 January 2016	19 October 2016	HDZ
Minister of Regional Development and EU funds	Tomislav Tolušić	22 January 2016	19 October 2016	HDZ
Minister of the Interior	Vlaho Orepić	22 January 2016	19 October 2016	Independent
Minister of Finance	Zdravko Marić	22 January 2016	19 October 2016	Independent
Minister of Defence	Josip Buljević	22 January 2016	19 October 2016	HDZ
Minister of Health	Dario Nakić	22 January 2016	19 October 2016	HDZ
Minister of Justice	Ante Šprlje	22 January 2016	19 October 2016	Independent
Minister of Public Administration	Dubravka Jurlina Alibegović	22 January 2016	19 October 2016	Independent
Minister of Economy	Tomislav Panenić	22 January 2016	19 October 2016	MOST
Minister of Entrepreneurship and Crafts	Darko Horvat	22 January 2016	19 October 2016	HDZ
Minister of Labour and Pension System	Nada Šikić	22 January 2016	19 October 2016	HDZ
Minister of Maritime Affairs, Transport and Infrastructure	Oleg Butković	22 January 2016	19 October 2016	HDZ
Minister of Science, Education and Sport	Predrag Šustar	22 January 2016	19 October 2016	HDZ
Minister of Agriculture	Davor Romić	22 January 2016	19 October 2016	Independent
Minister of Tourism	Anton Kliman	22 January 2016	19 October 2016	HDZ
Minister of Environmental and Nature Protection	Slaven Dobrović	22 January 2016	19 October 2016	MOST
Minister of Construction and Physical Planning	Lovro Kuščević	22 January 2016	19 October 2016	HDZ
Minister of Veterans' Affairs	Tomo Medved	21 March 2016	19 October 2016	HDZ
Minister of Culture	Zlatko Hasanbegović	22 January 2016	19 October 2016	HDZ

== Former members ==
Minister	Party	Portfolio	Period	Days in office
Mijo Crnoja	HDZ	Minister of Veterans' Affairs	22 January 2016 – 28 January 2016	6
Tomislav Karamarko	HDZ	First Deputy Prime Minister	22 January 2016 – 15 June 2016	146
Božo Petrov	Most	Deputy Prime Minister of Croatia	22 January 2016 – 13 October 2016	265
