= Velimir Bujanec =

Croatian journalist and television presenter

- Born: 18 November 1974 (age 51); Varaždin, SR Croatia, SFR Yugoslavia
- Occupations: Journalist, talk show host and editor
- Spouse: Karolina Šego (m. 2017)

Velimir Bujanec (born 18 November 1974) is a Croatian far-right journalist and talk-show host. He is the editor and host of Croatian political talk show Bujica.

== Biography ==
Velimir Bujanec was born in Varaždin, on 18 November 1974. He spent his early years in Varaždinske Toplice and attended the First Gymnasium of Varaždin. Subsequently, he studied political science in Zagreb. In 1990, with the support of Ivić Pašalić, he became the president of Croatian Democratic Union's youth branch. In 1991, he became the president of Croatian Party of Rights youth branch. During the Croatian War of Independence, he joined the Croatian Army and participated in Operation Flash and Operation Storm. In 1996, he gave an interview to Croatian magazine Nacional, in which he complained how difficult it was to find a girlfriend willing to attend masses for the 'Poglavnik and the Independent State of Croatia. He had previously caused controversy by posting multiple photos from his youth in which he is seen wearing a Nazi uniform with a swastika armband. He later tried to distance himself from Nazi ideology, claiming he was not an Ustasha and describing his views merely as right-wing and conservative. He also attempted to downplay his wearing of Nazi uniforms, claiming he was only wearing them as "carnival costumes".

=== Professional career ===
During the 1990s, he started working as a journalism and published work in ST, Hrvatsko pravo and Panorama. He was also the main editor of tabloid Imperijal.

In 2009, he launched his eponymous talk-show Bujica on Open TV which later became Jabuka TV. He subsequently started broadcasting his talk-show on other local television networks across Croatia such as: Mreža TV, Osječka Televizija and Z1. According to Croatian daily Jutarnji list, initially, in his talk-show he only interviewed marginal people of the Croatian right-wing political scene who were mostly unknown to the public. However, with his support, some of these people later became high-ranking political officials at all levels of government. In 2015, then-presidential candidate Kolinda Grabar-Kitarović gave her first interview on Bujica. After Grabar-Kitarović's win in the presidential election, Bujanec was invited to her inauguration and he used this opportunity to establish himself further as an important factor on the Croatian right-wing political scene. Bujanec also played a major role in the 2014–2016 Croatian war veterans protest. According to Jutarnji, after Tomislav Karamarko won a majority in the 2015 Croatian parliamentary election, quite a few of former guests on Bujica were appointed to distinguished positions.

In January 2026, Z1 Television announced that they are cancelling Bujica due to legal pressures, caused by a series of lawsuits related to the broadcasting of Bujenec's show. According to broadcaster, these have resulted in high costs, while several additional court proceedings are still ongoing. Their outcome is uncertain and could further financially burden the television company’s operations. The statement also noted that Z1 was excluded from participating in public tenders of the Agency for Electronic Media for a period of 24 months, as a consequence of airing Bujica.

== Controversies ==
In January 2026, while appearing on a right-wing Podcast Velebit, Bujanec admitted that, during the early stages of the Croatian War of Independence in 1991, he fabricated lists of alleged “UDBA agents” and “KOS agents” while working with the newspaper Slobodni tjednik. According to Bujanec, the lists were created by arbitrarily selecting names from telephone books, modifying them to appear credible, and occasionally including individuals with whom he had personal disputes.

== Personal life ==
In 2017, Bujanec married Karolina Šego.

== Legal issues ==
In 2014, he was arrested for providing a prostitute with cocaine and spent a month in Remetinec prison. He was sentenced to a total of ten months in prison, suspended for three years. In 2023, he and two other men were recorded singing "Jasenovac i Gradiška Stara", a song notorious for glorifying massacres perpetrated by the Ustashas during World War II.
