= Bernardica Juretić =

Croatian psychologist and humanitarian

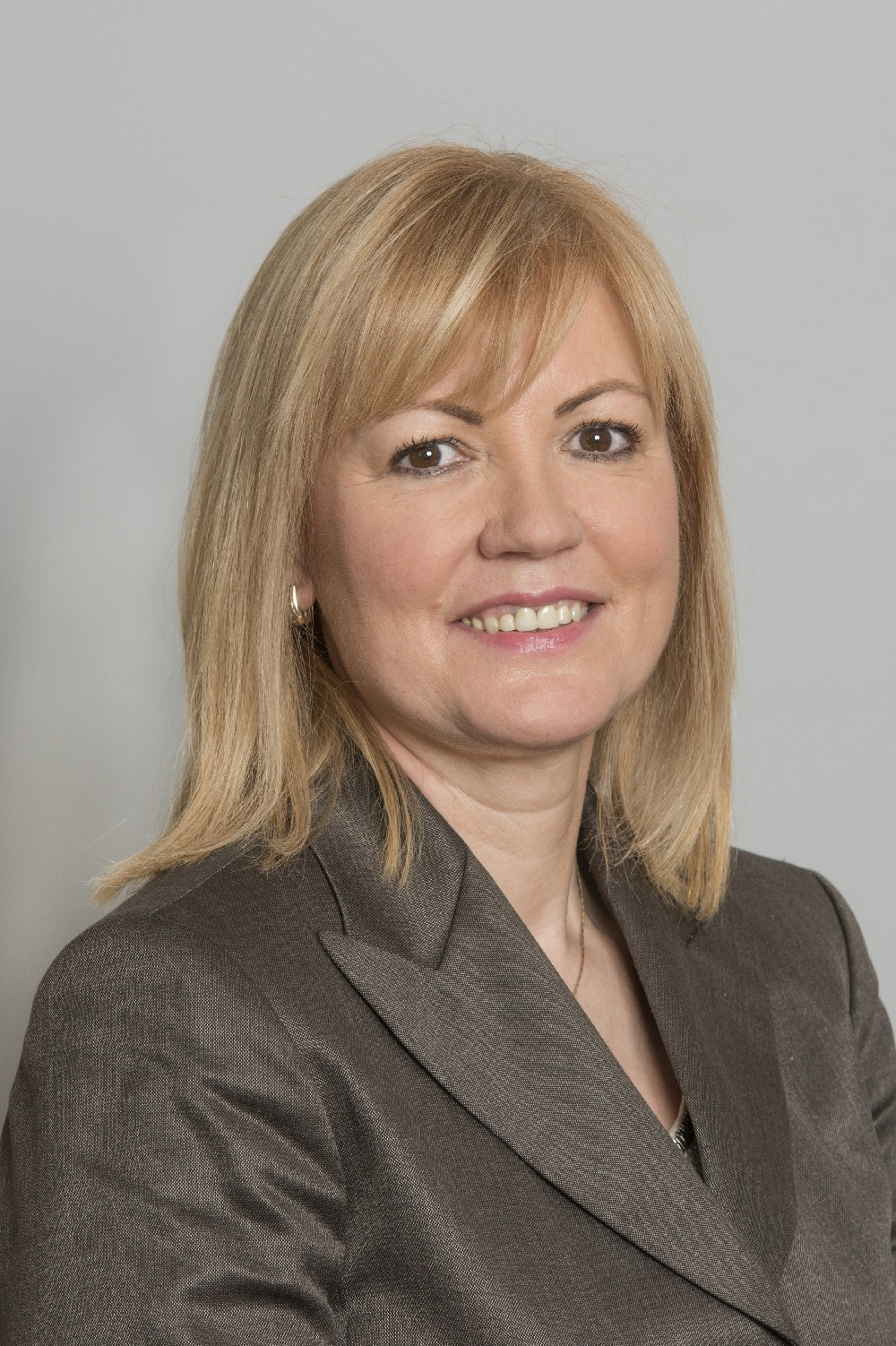

Minister of Social Policy and Youth
- In office 22 January 2016 – 19 October 2016
- President: Kolinda Grabar-Kitarović
- Prime Minister: Tihomir Orešković
- Preceded by: Milanka Opačić
- Succeeded by: Nada Murganić

Personal details
- Born: 18 August 1963 (age 63) Srijane (near Omiš), SR Croatia, SFR Yugoslavia (modern Croatia)
- Party: Croatian Democratic Union (2016–)
- Spouse: Vlado Rožman (m. 2016)
- Education: Salesian Pontifical University

Bernardica Juretić (born 18 August 1963) is a former Croatian Catholic nun and psychologist who served as the Minister of Social Policy and Youth in the Cabinet of Tihomir Orešković from 22 January 2016 until its dissolution and appointment of the new government in September 2016.

== Early life and education ==
Bernardica Juretić was born on 18 August 1963 in small village of Srijane near Omiš. She finished "23 Maj" elementary school in her hometown in 1978, after which she enrolled in Dubrovnik Nursing high school from which she graduated in 1982. In 1984, at the age of 21, she became a nun by joining the Italian Ancelle Della Carita' order. She eventually left order in 1990 at the age of 27 due to many other obligations that she had around taking care of drug addicts. Juretić continued her education at the Salesian Pontifical University in Rome from which she graduated in 1988 in psychology with thesis The purpose of human suffering in the wake of [Viktor] Frankl's logotherapy. She gained her masters degree in 1990 with thesis AIDS patients from a psychological point of view at the same University. She enrolled in a doctoral studies in 1995.

== Career ==
Bernardica Juretić worked as a nurse in Caritas Elderly People's Home in Freyung, Germany (1984–1986). In 1990 she founded Zajednica susret, first non-governmental humanitarian organization for the prevention of drug abuse and treatment of drug addicts in the former SFR Yugoslavia. From 1992 until 1996, Juretić opened three therapeutic communities in Paučje, Ivanovac, and Čiovo, as well as three advisory centers. In 1991, Juretić was appointed as a member of the National Committee for the fight against drug addiction of the Croatian Government. In 1994, she became National Coordinator of NGOs in the field of prevention and treatment of drug addictions. In 2000, Juretić opened therapeutic community for the treatment of drug addicts in Banja Luka in Bosnia and Herzegovina. From 2001 until 2003, Juretić served as a Head of the Therapeutic Center Čiovo that she founded. In 2002, she became President of the Expert Council of the Croatian Government for combating narcotic drug abuse, and in 2003 Head of the Office of the Croatian Government for combating drug abuse. She served on this position until 2008. In 2004, she became lecturer in the Department of Occupational Therapy of the School of Health Studies. From 2008 until 2011, Juretić served as assistant director and Head of the Human Resources Management of Institut IGH. In 2012, she was named external member of the Board of Health and Social Affairs of the Croatian Parliament, and director of "Zajednica susret". On 22 January 2016, Juretić become Minister of Social Policy and Youth.

When confronted with allegations of the conflict of interest in June 2016, after it surfaced that she had allotted a significant portion of state budget funds to NGO "Susret", an organisation which she personally founded and operated prior to her appointment as minister in Orešković's cabinet, Juretić infamously retorted to gathered press reporters "Let them drop dead", apparently alluding at her critics and whistle-blowers.

== Personal life ==
Juretić married Croatian entrepreneur Vlado Rožman in April 2016. The couple doesn't have any children. Juretić stated that she once thought about adopting a child, but that she eventually gave up because she believes that "every child needs mother and father, even if they eventually get divorced".

Juretić is a devoted Roman Catholic. Day before becoming a minister, Juretić wrote post on Facebook in which she thanked her friends for their congratulations, and urged those who are believers to pray for her and the whole Government for the Holy Spirit to enlighten them so they could work only for the glory of God. On 5 February 2016, Juretić gave an interview for RTL Televizija in which she stated, among other, that "only the power of God and His help can get us out [of these problems]. Of course, with our effort, but surely we cannot do that alone." She refuses to talk about abortion, artificial insemination and the Life Partnership Act for same-sex couples because she considers those questions to be ideological. She speaks Croatian, German, Italian, English, Spanish and Portuguese fluently.
