= Berislav Šipuš =

Croatian composer, conductor and music educator

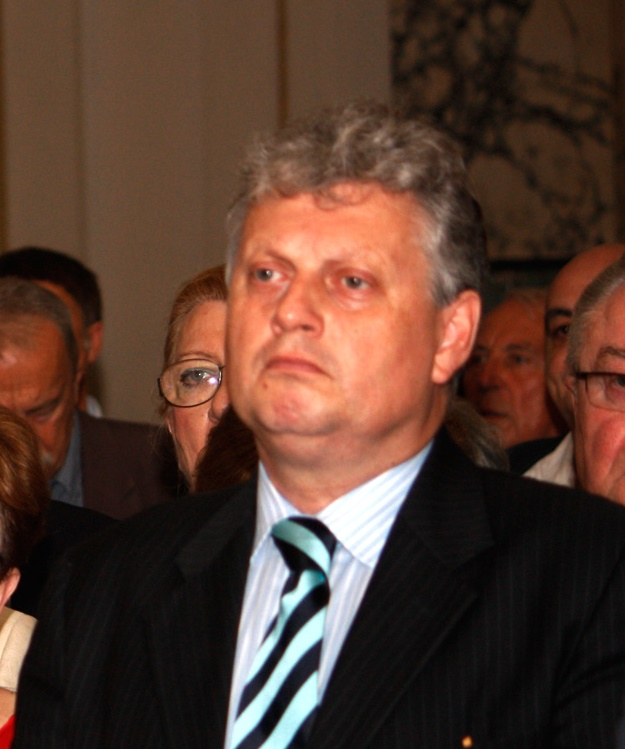

Minister of Culture
- In office 24 April 2015 – 22 January 2016
- President: Ivo Josipović (2015); Kolinda Grabar-Kitarović (2016)
- Prime Minister: Zoran Milanović
- Preceded by: Andrea Zlatar-Violić
- Succeeded by: Zlatko Hasanbegović

Personal details
- Born: 14 May 1958 (age 68) Zagreb, SR Croatia, SFR Yugoslavia (modern Croatia)
- Party: Independent
- Education: University of Zagreb
- Profession: Composer
- Awards: Order of Danica Hrvatska

Berislav Šipuš (born 14 May 1958) is a Croatian composer, conductor and music educator who served as 9th Minister of Culture from 24 April 2015 until 22 January 2016 in the Cabinet of Zoran Milanović.

== Personal life and education ==
Berislav Šipuš was born in Zagreb on May 14, 1956. Along with studying art history at the Zagreb Faculty of Humanities and Social Sciences he graduated in composition in 1987 at the Zagreb Academy of Music in the class of professor Stanko Horvat. He attended gained music education under professors Gilbert Bosco from Udine, François-Bernard Mâche and Iannis Xenakis from Paris. Šipuš got additional education in conducting from Vladimir Kranjčević, Željko Brkanović, Kresimir Sipusch and Milan Horvat.

== Career ==
From 1979 until 1982 he was working as accompanist at the Ballet section of the Croatian National Theater in Zagreb, from 1987 until 1989 as a music theory lecturer at the Elly Bašić Music School in Zagreb, from 1988 until 1989 the accompanist in Bermuda Civic Ballet, and in 1989 producer in the Vatroslav Lisinski Concert Hall. In year 1989, he began his cooperation with the Teatro alla Scala in Milan, Italy, where he worked as accompanist at the Ballet section (1989–1999), a conductor in the ballet productions (1997–1999) and accompanist and assistant conductor in the theater Opera section (1999–2001). At the same time, Šipuš was active in Zagreb, particularly at the Zagreb Academy of Music, where he worked as the lecturer of musical theory (1988–1989), Assistant Professor at the Department of Composition and Music Theory (since 1998), associate professor (since 2005) and full-time professor (since 2009). He was also a producer in years 1987 and 1989, as well as artistic director of Music Biennale Zagreb (1997–2011).

From 2001 until 2005, Šipuš served as a Director of the Zagreb Philharmonic Orchestra and artistic director of the Cantus Ansambl. Since 2012, he is honorary artistic director of Cantus Ansambl. Since 2007, Šipuš is leader and chief conductor of the Croatian Chamber Orchestra. After the death of Daniel Marušič in 2009, Šipuš served as artistic director of the Osor Music Evenings until 2011. In addition, he was also a president of the Croatian Musical Youth association. After centre-left Kukuriku coalition won 2011 parliamentary election, Šipuš was named Assistant Minister in the Ministry of Culture with Minister being professor Andrea Zlatar-Violić. After Zlatar-Violić resigned in March 2015, Croatian People's Party – Liberal Democrats decided to propose Šipuš as new Minister. He was approved by the Croatian Parliament on April 24, 2015, thus becoming 9th Croatian Minister of Culture.

Berislav Šipuš is an Associate member of the Croatian Academy of Sciences and Arts (Department of Music and Musicology), since May 10, 2012.

== Awards and honors ==
- 1985 – Rector's Award of the University of Zagreb
- 1985 – First and third prize at the 15th International Jeunesses Musicales Competition in Belgrade
- 1985 – National Yugoslav awarded of Seven Secretaries of SKOJ
- 1987 – Award of the Music Biennale Zagreb
- 1988 – Award of the Croatian Music Institute
- 1995 – Vjesnik's Josip Slavenski Award
- 2002 – Boris Papandopulo Award of the Croatian Composers' Society
- 2004 – Ordre des Arts et des Lettres by the Ministry of Culture of France
- 2009 – Order of Danica Hrvatska with face of Marko Marulić
- 2009 – Vladimir Nazor Award for ballet Process
- 2009 – Boris Papandopulo Award of the Croatian Composers Society
- 2014 – Medal of the President of the Republic of Italy, the Order of Star of Italy and the title of Commendatore

== List of works ==
See: HDS ZAMP: Berislav Šipuš (list of works)
