= Dubravka Jurlina Alibegović =

Croatian economist and politician

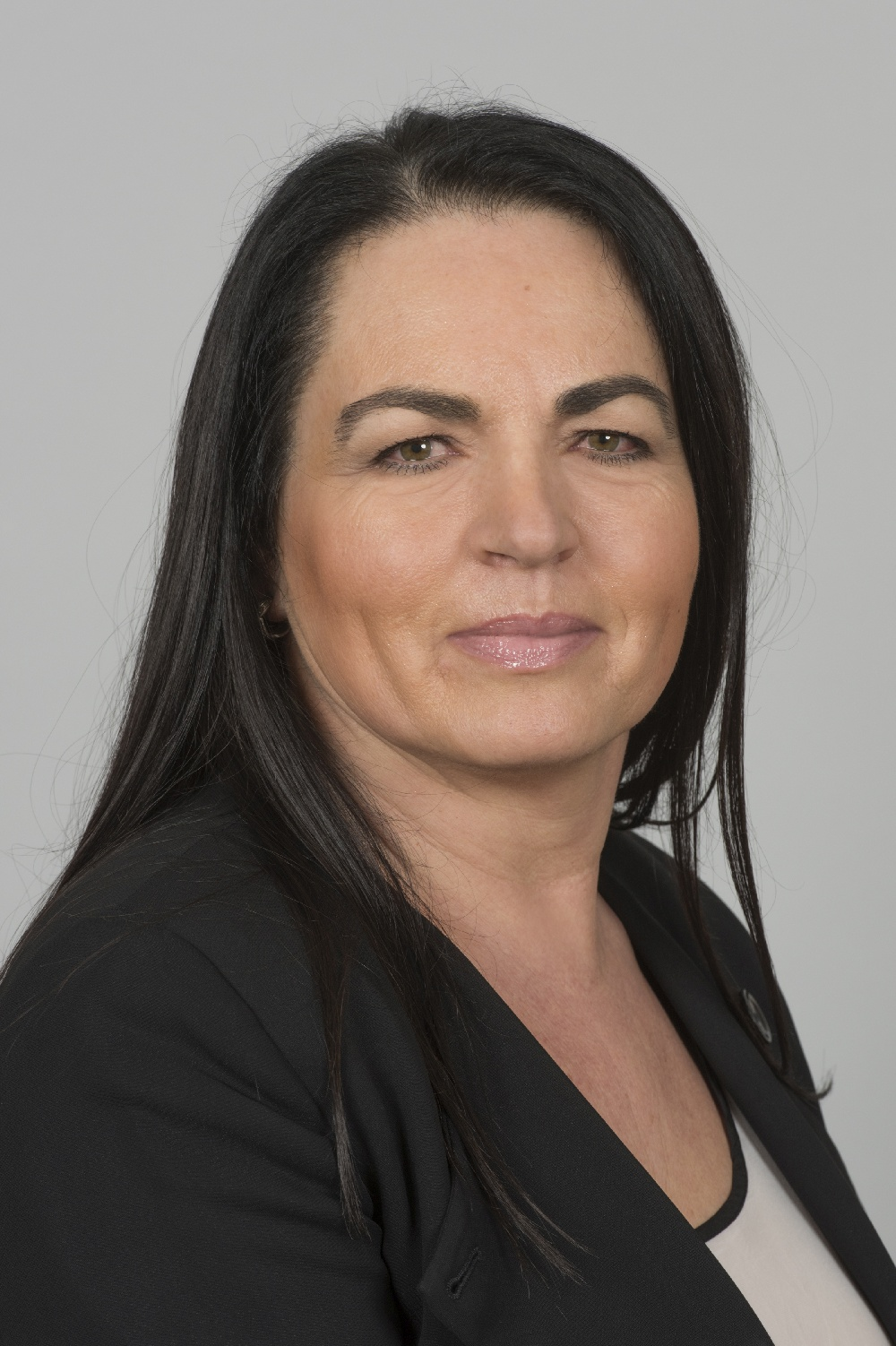
Alibegović in 2016

Dubravka Jurlina Alibegović (born 5 November 1963) is a Croatian economist and politician. She served as the deputy minister for science and technology, and then as the Minister of Public Administration from January to October 2016.

== Life ==
Born in Zagreb on 5 November 1963, Jurlina Alibegović attended school in Zagreb, and is a graduate of the Faculty of Economics and Business, University of Zagreb. She earned a Master of Arts degree in 1992, followed by a doctoral degree in 2006. Her doctoral thesis was on the subject of financing regional development. She was appointed the director of the Institute of Economics in 2013, taking over from Sandra Švaljek. Jurlina Alibegović remained director there until 2016.

== Political career ==
As an independent in the Cabinet of Tihomir Orešković, Jurlina Alibegović served as the Minister of Public Administration from January to October 2016. She had previously served as the deputy minister in Racan's government, in the department of the Ministry of Science and Technology.

Jurlina Alibegović then returned to the University of Zagreb, where as of 2025 she is a senior research fellow and the deputy director of the Department for Regional Development. Her research interests include macroeconomic policy, labour markets, and financial economics.

Alibegović sits or has sat on the editorial board of various academic publications, including the CEA Journal of Economics and the Journal of Contemporary European Studies. She is a member of the Board of Directors of the European Urban Research Association (EURA), the Croatian section of the European Regional Science Association (ERSA) and the Euro-Mediterranean Forum of Institutes of Economic Sciences.

Political offices
Preceded by Arsen Bauk	Minister of Public Administration; 2016	Succeeded by Ivan Kovačić
