= Mirela Holy =

Croatian politician (born 1971)

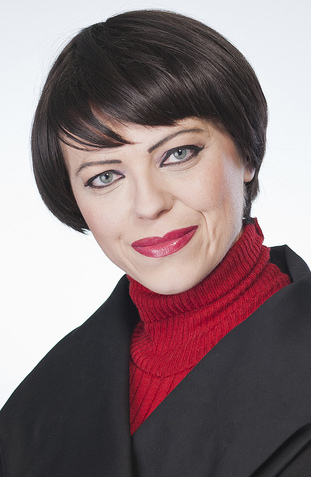
- Mirela Holy in 2011

Minister of Environmental and Nature Protection
- In office 23 December 2011 – 13 June 2012
- Prime Minister: Zoran Milanović
- Preceded by: Office established
- Succeeded by: Mihael Zmajlović

Personal details
- Born: 15 December 1971 (age 54) Zagreb, SR Croatia, SFR Yugoslavia
- Party: Social Democratic Party (1998–2015, 2019–); Croatian Sustainable Development (2013–2016)
- Education: University of Zagreb

Mirela Holy (born 15 December 1971) is a Croatian academic, politician and a former leader of the centre-left Croatian Sustainable Development party (ORaH). She served as Croatia's Minister of Environment from 2011 until 2012, the first and to date only woman to hold this position.

== Education ==
Holy studied ethnology and cultural anthropology, and comparative literature at the University of Zagreb and received her PhD in cultural studies in 2005.

== Minister of Environmental Protection ==
From 23 December 2011 until 13 June 2012 Holy was Minister of Environmental Protection and Nature in the centre left Government of Zoran Milanović. She resigned her position on 6 June 2012 after an outcry over an email in which she asked manager of the HŽ Holding to consider the possibility of not firing his secretary, because she was an elderly woman with more than 15 years of experience, and was working in that state-owned company for less than a month. Mihael Zmajlović succeeded her as minister.

== ORaH establishment ==
In 2013 she left the Social Democratic Party due to her public disagreement with the party's environmental policy. After her departure from SDP, Holy founded a new party called ORaH (ORaH means walnut in Croatian) which stands for Održivi razvoj Hrvatske (Croatian Sustainable Development). She left the party in February 2016.

== Activism ==
She is one of the most recognizable Croatian female politicians and a notable supporter of LGBT and women's rights. She was also named 'Croatian Homofriend' in 2012.

== Academic career ==
Since 2017, Holy has been a professor at VERN university. She has also acted as the university’s head of Cyber Communication and Network Science programme and the Sustainable Tourism Management programme.

== Private life ==
Mirela Holy was born to a Czech father and a Croatian mother. She has been in a 15-year-long cohabitation with Croatian photographer Siniša Bužan. The couple has no plans to get married.
