= Mihael Zmajlović =

Croatian economist and politician

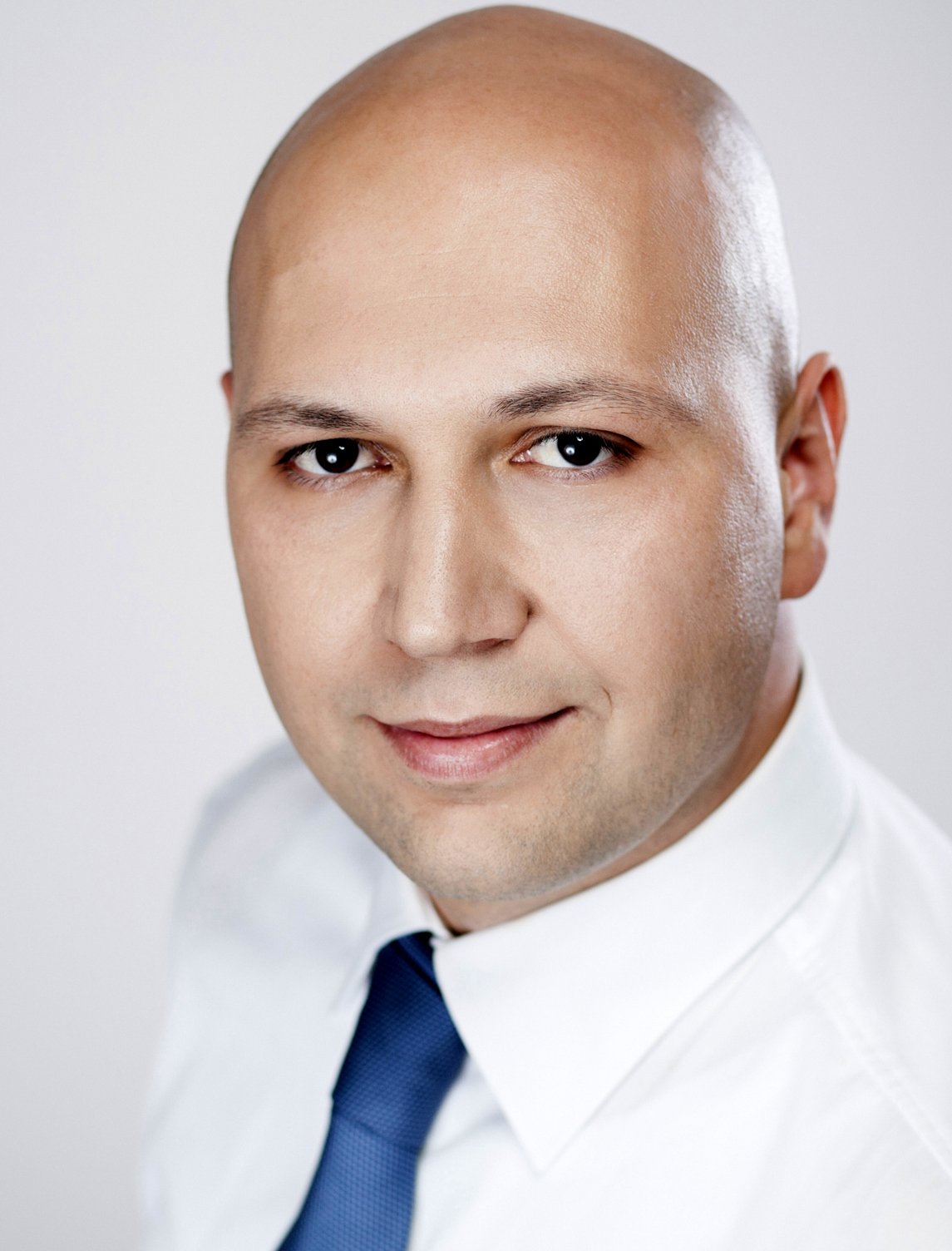

President of the Assembly of Zagreb County
- In office 20 June 2017 – 27 December 2017
- Preceded by: Dražen Bošnjaković
- Succeeded by: Damir Mikuljan

Minister of Environmental Protection and Nature
- In office 13 June 2012 – 22 January 2016
- President: Ivo Josipović (2012–2015); Kolinda Grabar-Kitarović (2015–2016)
- Prime Minister: Zoran Milanović
- Preceded by: Mirela Holy
- Succeeded by: Slaven Dobrović

Personal details
- Born: 19 January 1978 (age 48) Jastrebarsko, SR Croatia, SFR Yugoslavia (modern Croatia)
- Party: Social Democratic Party
- Spouse: Marija Presečki
- Children: 2
- Education: University of Zagreb (Faculty of Economics)
- Occupation: Economist

Mihael Zmajlović (born 19 January 1978) is a Croatian economist and politician who served as a minister at Ministry of Environmental Protection and Nature at the Cabinet of Zoran Milanović from 2012 until 2016, had previously served as mayor of Jastrebarsko from 2009 until 2012. He is a member of the centre-left Social Democratic Party of Croatia.

== Education ==
Zmajlović finished elementary school "Ljubo Babić" in Jastrebarsko and 15th Gymnasium in Zagreb. He graduated from the University of Zagreb Faculty of Economics where he also gained his PhD in year 2008.

Since 2010, Zmajlović is a member of the Presidium of the Association of Croatian cities and chairman of the local action group "Jana". In 2012 he was briefly a member of the board of the Fund for Environmental Protection and Energy Efficiency.

== Political career ==
Zmajlović is a member of the Social Democratic Party since 2005. In the same year, he was elected president of the Jastrebarsko city organization of the Party. Five years later he became president of the party organization of the Zagreb County.

In 2009 local elections, he was elected mayor of the City of Jastrebarsko. He served as mayor for three years. He was succeeded by his deputy Zvonimir Novosel.

In 2011 parliamentary elections, Zmajlović was elected to the Croatian Parliament from the list of Kukuriku coalition. He was president of the Committee for Physical Planning and Construction and member of the Committee for finance and state budget.

He became a member of the presidency of SDP at the Party convention in June 2012.

After the resignation of Mirela Holy as Minister of Environment and Nature Protection, at the proposal of Prime Minister Zoran Milanović, Zmajlović was elected minister on 13 June 2012.

== Personal life ==
Zmajlović is married to Marija Zmajlović with whom he has two children. He speaks English, Italian and German.
