= Arsen Bauk =

Croatian politician (born 1973)

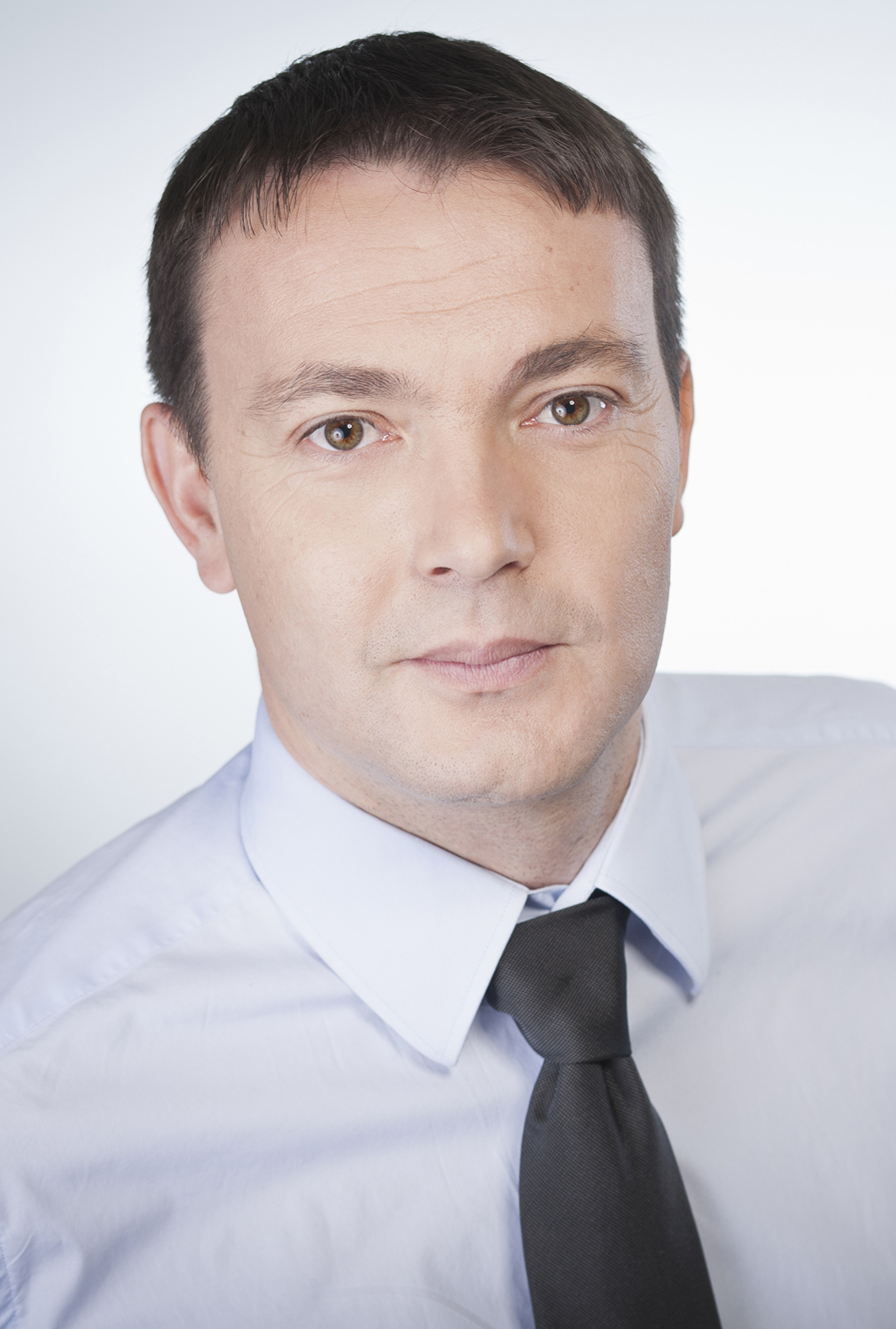

Minister of Public Administration
- In office 23 December 2011 – 22 January 2016
- Prime Minister: Zoran Milanović
- Preceded by: Davorin Mlakar
- Succeeded by: Dubravka Jurlina Alibegović

Personal details
- Born: 7 February 1973 (age 53) Supetar, SR Croatia, SFR Yugoslavia
- Party: Social Democratic Party
- Education: University of Zagreb
- Occupation: Politician
- Profession: Physicist

Arsen Bauk (born 7 February 1973) is a Croatian politician who served as a minister at Ministry of Public Administration at the Cabinet of Zoran Milanović from 2011 until 2016. He is member of the center-left Social Democratic Party of Croatia (SDP).
