= Milanka Opačić =

Croatian politician

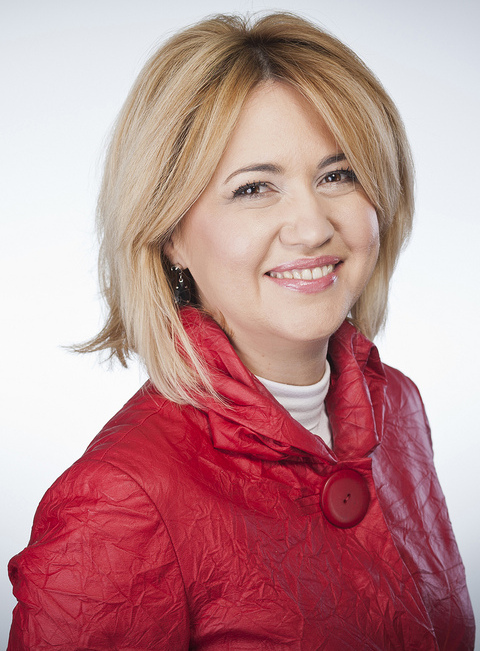

Deputy Prime Minister of Croatia
- In office 23 December 2011 – 22 January 2016
- Prime Minister: Zoran Milanović
- Preceded by: Gordan Jandroković
- Succeeded by: Božo Petrov

Minister of Social Policy and Youth
- In office 23 December 2011 – 22 January 2016
- Prime Minister: Zoran Milanović
- Preceded by: Darko Milinović (Health and Social Welfare)
- Succeeded by: Bernardica Juretić

Personal details
- Born: 17 April 1968 (age 58) Zagreb, SR Croatia, SFR Yugoslavia
- Party: BM 365 (2019–present)
- Other political affiliations: Social Democratic Party (1990–2018)
- Children: 1

Milanka Opačić (Croatian pronunciation: [mǐlaːŋka ǒpatʃitɕ]; born 17 April 1968) is a Croatian politician who served as a Minister of Social Welfare and Youth at centre-left Cabinet of Zoran Milanović from 2011 to 2016. She served as one of four vice-presidents of the Social Democratic Party, the main centre-left political party in the Sabor. She was first elected to Sabor in the 1992 parliamentary election, and was reelected in 2000, 2003, 2007, 2011, 2015 and 2016.

== Education and career ==
Opačić was born in Zagreb, SR Croatia, then part of SFR Yugoslavia, where she attended elementary and secondary school. In 1990, inspired by Ivica Račan, she became a member of the Social Democratic Party. She studied political science at the University of Zagreb, graduating in 1991. In 1992, Opačić became the party's vice-president and entered the Sabor as a representative of the Serbs of Croatia. She was re-elected to the Sabor in 2000, 2003 and 2007. She was one of the closest associates of former Prime Minister Zoran Milanović.

In September 2018, she left SDP and joined Bandić Milan 365 - Labour and Solidarity Party in August 2019.

== Personal life ==
Opačić is a single mother. She adopted a daughter named Lana in 2003. She is an atheist. Despite starting her career as a representative of the Serb minority in the Sabor, Opačić stated in Nedjeljom u dva that she does not label her nationality.

Political offices
| Preceded by Darko Milinović as Minister of Health and Social Welfare | Minister of Social Policy and Youth; 2011–2016 | Succeeded by Bernardica Juretić |
