= Operation Rain =

1993 armed conflict in Karlovac, Croatia

- Part of the Croatian War of Independence
Date	9–13 September 1993
Location	Karlovac, Croatia
Result	Croatian victory

Belligerents
Croatia	Serbian Krajina

Commanders and leaders
(Croatia) Josip Tomačić (Croatia) Tomo Medved	Unknown

Units involved
Croatian Army: 110th Infantry Brigade; 137th Brigade; Croatian Police	Army of Serbian Krajina: 21st Kordun (Bordunski) corps

Casualties and losses
9 soldiers killed, 11 civilians	Unknown

Operation Rain (Croatian: Operacija Kiša) or the Karlovac attack (Croatian: karlovački napad) was an offensive conducted by the proto-state Serbian Krajina in September 1993. The operation was launched in retaliation to Croatian Police activity in the Medak Pocket. The attack was one of the largest conducted by the Serbian Army of Krajina (SVK) against the Croatian Army and police positions in Karlovac, specifically in Turanj.

The Serbian Army of Krajina started with rocket and artillery attacks to destroy infrastructure and military positions, to cause general chaos in Karlovac. The SVK unsuccessfully attempted to seize Karlovac to gain an upper hand against Zagreb.

== Prelude ==
The Yugoslav People's Army and SAO Krajina took over most of Dalmatia and Gospić in 1991. In 1993, the Serbian Army of Krajina (SVK) threatened Gospić and other towns in the Dalmatian hinterland. The situation worsened when the SVK began shelling Gospić, now on the frontline. As a result, the Croatian Army mobilized around 2,500 infantry and commenced Operation Medak Pocket. After about 2 weeks, the Croatian Army had defeated the Serbian Army of Krajina.

== The attack ==
=== Shelling and rocketing of Karlovac ===
Primarily in response to Operation Medak Pocket, the SVK launched retaliatory attacks on Karlovac, along with Zagreb, Gospić and other towns, using mainly rocket launchers. The first strikes hit downtown Karlovac on 10 September, killing 7 and injuring at least 23; rocket and artillery attacks continued intermittently over the next 2–4 days. During the shelling, many civilians took refuge in bomb shelters.

=== Ground offensive ===
Between 9 and 13 September, soldiers from the Serbian Army of Krajina attacked Karlovac. The first 1–2 days of battle saw continuous shelling; the SVK then launched an organized attack on Karlovac, aiming to penetrate Turanj and threaten Zagreb and the Croatian Army. The attack was initially repelled by the 13th Karlovac Home Guard Regiment; on 13 September, battalions from the 110th and 137th Croatian Army (HV) brigades were also deployed. The SVK withdrew on the same day, marking Croatian victory.

As part of the defense, 9 Croatian soldiers and 11 civilians were killed in the shelling and gunfire, which obliged Franjo Tuđman to visit Karlovac and check on the wounded. An unknown number of Serbian Army of Krajina personnel were killed.

== Aftermath ==
Citizens of Karlovac believe that the defense of Karlovac in September 1993 was heroic, proving the Croatian Army to be an effective force. Consequently, 13 September in Karlovac is a day to honour veterans who defended the city against the SVK. According to Tomo Medved, Deputy Prime Minister of Croatia, the collapse of the Serbian Army of Krajina had been inevitable since the withdrawal of the Yugoslav People's Army, and the Serb Krajina forces were severely weakened after the attack on Karlovac.
