= Božo Petrov =

Croatian politician

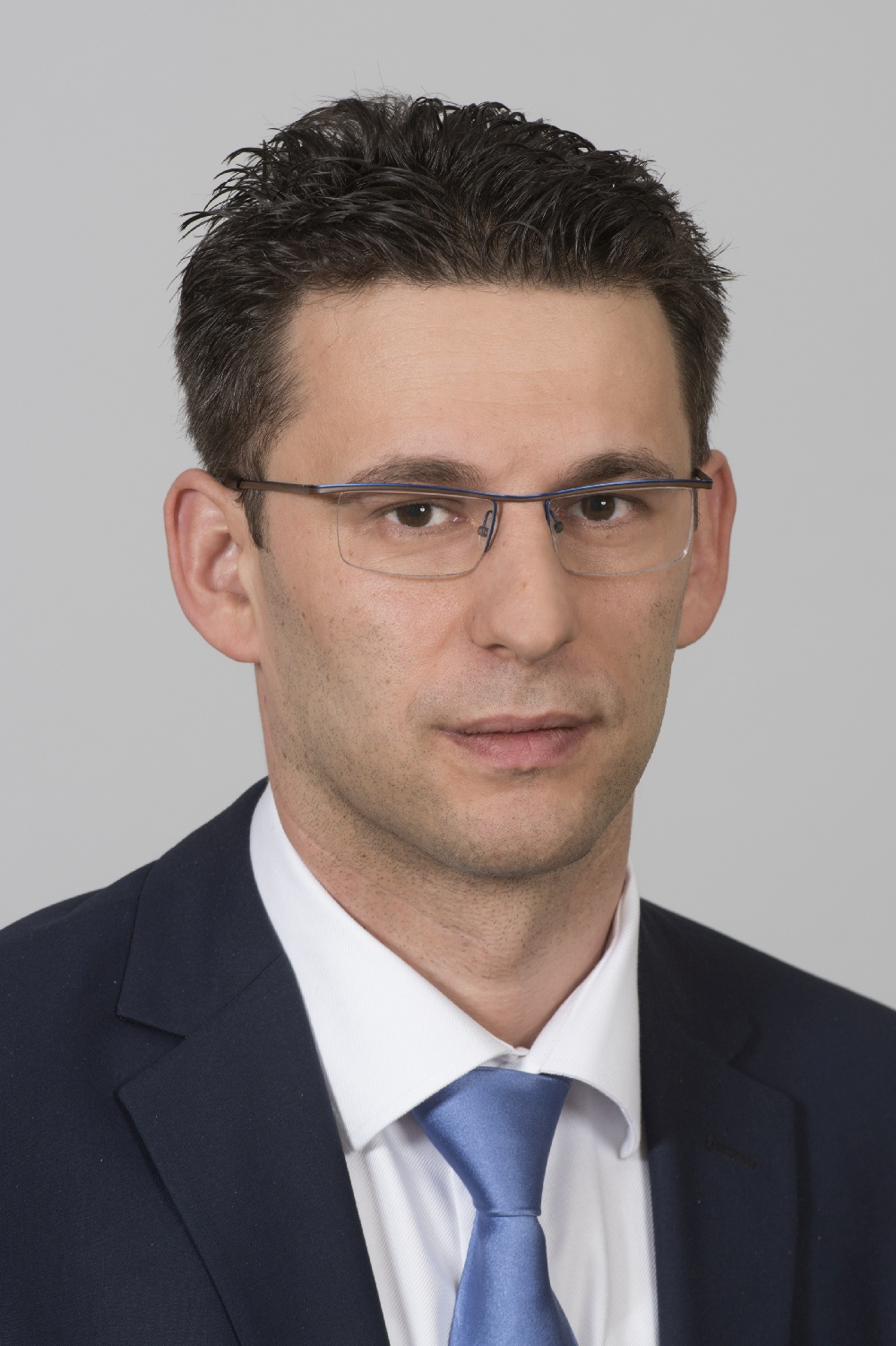

Deputy Speaker of the Croatian Parliament
- In office 30 June 2017 – 22 July 2020
- Preceded by: Ivan Vrdoljak
- Succeeded by: Miroslav Škoro

Speaker of the Croatian Parliament
- In office 14 October 2016 – 5 May 2017
- Preceded by: Željko Reiner
- Succeeded by: Gordan Jandroković

Deputy Prime Minister of Croatia
- In office 22 January 2016 – 14 October 2016
- Prime Minister: Tihomir Orešković
- Preceded by: Branko Grčić; Ranko Ostojić; Milanka Opačić
- Succeeded by: Ivan Kovačić; Davor Ivo Stier; Damir Krstičević; Martina Dalić

Mayor of Metković
- In office 2 June 2013 – 22 January 2016
- Preceded by: Stipo Gabrić
- Succeeded by: Katarina Ujdur

President of The Bridge
- In office 17 November 2012 – 8 November 2025
- Deputy: Miroslav Šimić; Robert Podolnjak
- Preceded by: Position established
- Succeeded by: Nikola Grmoja

Personal details
- Born: 16 October 1979 (age 47) Metković, SR Croatia, SFR Yugoslavia (modern Croatia)
- Party: The Bridge (2012–present)
- Spouse: Maša Petrov
- Children: 3
- Education: University of Mostar

Božo Petrov (pronounced [ˌbǒːʒo ˈpětroʋ]; born 16 October 1979) is a Croatian politician and psychiatrist who served as Speaker of the Croatian Parliament from 2016 to 2017. He was the president of The Bridge from its establishment until November 2025.

He previously served as mayor of his native town Metković from 2013 to 2016, and Deputy Prime Minister in the cabinet of Tihomir Orešković from January until his election as speaker in October 2016. Petrov resigned his position as speaker on 4 May 2017, amidst a government and parliamentary crisis. Having held the office for a little over six months, Petrov is to date the shortest serving Speaker of the Parliament since 1991.

== Personal life ==
=== Early life ===
Petrov was born in Metković to locksmith Jakov, and Marija Petrov, a bookkeeper. He has an elder sister, Nikolina, and two younger brothers, Branimir and Ivan. Petrov attended elementary school in his hometown and high school (classical Christian gymnasium) in Sinj. At the age of 14 he decided to join the Franciscan order, but eventually changed his mind.

Petrov graduated from the Medical Faculty of the University of Mostar in Bosnia and Herzegovina, and specialized psychiatry in the Psychiatric Hospital Vrapče in Zagreb, after which he worked as a psychiatrist at the University Clinical Hospital in Mostar.

=== Family ===
He is married to Maša Petrov, a primary school teacher, with whom he has three sons: Jakov, Dominik, and Andrija.

== Political career ==
Petrov began his political career as an independent candidate in the 2011 parliamentary election on the list of the conservative Croatian Growth (HRAST) party. He eventually ended his collaboration with Hrast because "they betrayed its members and sided with the HDZ", which he did not approve.

On 17 November 2012, Petrov and other local politicians and activists life founded the Bridge of Independent Lists (MOST) as a regionalist political platform and was chosen as its first president.

In 2013, the Bridge of Independent Lists participated in the local elections in the town of Metković. The party won 46.25% of votes and 9 out of 17 seats in the city council. Petrov won 45.78% of the votes and entered the second round of election for the mayor against Stipo Gabrić, incumbent mayor since 1997. In the second round Petrov won with 67.94% of the votes and became the mayor of his hometown. At the same election Bridge of Independent Lists won 9.97% of the votes in county elections and entered the County Assembly of the Dubrovnik-Neretva County.

As mayor, Petrov cut his and the city councillors' wage to the minimum. Finding a city debt of HRK17.6 million, he managed to bring it down by 6.4 million, or 36%. His deputies work as volunteers, while the councillors' fees amount to a symbolic 1 HRK. Petrov abolished also the compensation to the members of supervisory boards and management councils, and representation expenses decreased by 10 times and travel costs by 8 times. He also terminated several expensive public contracts, and introduced transparency in public spending. His work to sanitize the city's budget got him to be declared the best mayor in the region. After having halved the city debt, he increased the salaries of the city administration, but they remained 30% lower than they were at the time he took office as mayor.

=== 2015 parliamentary election ===
For the 2015 parliamentary election, Petrov's Most party went national and was joined by independent local politicians from other parts of the country. Led by Petrov, the party campaigned for fiscal responsibility, reduction of government spending and public debt, tax cuts, reforms in the public sector and the reduction of administrative divisions in Croatia.

Petrov's party turned out the surprise of the election, with 13.17% of the votes and 19 seats in the Croatian Parliament. The party had a crucial role in forming the new government and started negotiations with the ruling centre-left Croatia is Growing coalition, centred around the Social Democratic Party (SDP), and the opposition centre-right Patriotic Coalition, centred around the Croatian Democratic Union (HDZ). Members of the party said that they won’t join any of the two coalitions in forming the new government unless their reform agenda is adopted. After more than 40 days of negotiations and numerous twists, Most decided to give its support to a government led by the HDZ, giving them a slim majority of 78 seats. They nominated the Croatian Canadian businessman Tihomir Orešković to be the next Prime Minister.

=== Deputy Prime Minister (2016) ===
The new government was approved by the Sabor on 22 January 2016. Petrov was named Deputy Prime Minister. Along with Petrov, six ministers in the government were nominated by Most.

In February, the Most party prepared amendments for reducing benefits of members of the parliament, but the bill was stopped and did not reach voting in the Sabor. The party accused HDZ and SDP for blocking the bill.

In March, Petrov and his party announced amendments to the law regulating the rights of former presidents of Croatia that would rescind the Office of the Former President. This move revoked the entitlements of former president Stjepan Mesić, who criticized the move, and saved around 600,000 HRK to the government budget. In the same month, Petrov started negotiations with labour union representatives over a 6 percent wage increase for public sector workers, as GDP grew over 2% for two consecutive quarters. The wage rise was signed in 2009 by the government of Ivo Sanader with labour unions. The government had not planned funds for the wage increase in the 2016 budget and wanted to negotiate new terms of the contract, as there was no money for its implementation.

Relations between Most and the Patriotic Coalition have long been strained and continued to deteriorate in May. Members of HDZ started talking about reshuffling the government. After it was revealed that the wife of Tomislav Karamarko had business with the consultant of Hungarian oil company MOL, Petrov and his party called for Karamarko to resign due to political responsibility. A vote of no confidence was started by SDP in the Sabor, which was backed by ministers and MPs from the Most party. After Karamarko refused to step down, Petrov said that he and ministers from his party are ready to resign if Karamarko remained in the government, adding that "an individual should never be above the state". On 3 June, in an attempt at a compromise solution, Prime Minister Tihomir Orešković called on Petrov and Karamarko to resign for the sake of stability of the country. Orešković said that their relations have become a burden for the government. Petrov responded that he is ready to step down if it will help stabilise the situation in the country, while Karamarko refused to resign and stressed out that Orešković no longer has the support of HDZ. A vote of no confidence in the Prime Minister was initiated by HDZ. Petrov's party continued to support Orešković and asked for the resignation of Karamarko. On 16 June the confidence vote took place in the Parliament that resulted in the fall of Orešković's government by a vote of 125 MPs in favour, 15 against and 2 abstentions. Both HDZ and most of the opposition voted in favour, while the Bridge of Independent Lists voted against.

=== Speaker of Parliament (2016–2017) ===
Petrov was elected as the 11th Speaker of the Croatian Parliament on 14 October 2016 with 132 members of Parliament voting in favor, 1 against and 12 abstaining. Having taken office two days before his 37th birthday, Petrov became the youngest person ever to hold the position of the speaker. As per a post-election agreement between Petrov's Bridge of Independent Lists party and the Croatian Democratic Union (HDZ) led by Prime Minister Andrej Plenković, Petrov was due to serve as speaker for a 2-year period and would thereafter have been replaced by speaker from the HDZ, presumably the party's general secretary and former foreign minister Gordan Jandroković. Petrov resigned from office on 4 May 2017 amidst a government crisis which began on 27 April 2017 when Prime Minister Plenković removed three government ministers supported by Petrov's Most party and escalated further to a point where Plenković's Croatian Democratic Union began to gather signatures for Petrov's removal from office via no confidence vote. Croatian Parliament formally dismissed him from his position as speaker on 5 May 2017. Petrov remains a member of the Parliament. He was succeeded as speaker by the former foreign minister and deputy prime minister Gordan Jandroković on 5 May 2017.

Party political offices
Preceded by Position created	President of the Bridge of Independent Lists; 2012–present	Incumbent
Political offices
Preceded by Branko Grčić; Milanka Opačić; Ranko Ostojić	Deputy Prime Minister of Croatia; 2016	Succeeded by Ivan Kovačić
Preceded by Željko Reiner	Speaker of the Croatian Parliament; 2016–2017	Succeeded by Gordan Jandroković
