= Andrea Zlatar Violić =

Croatian politician (1961–2026)

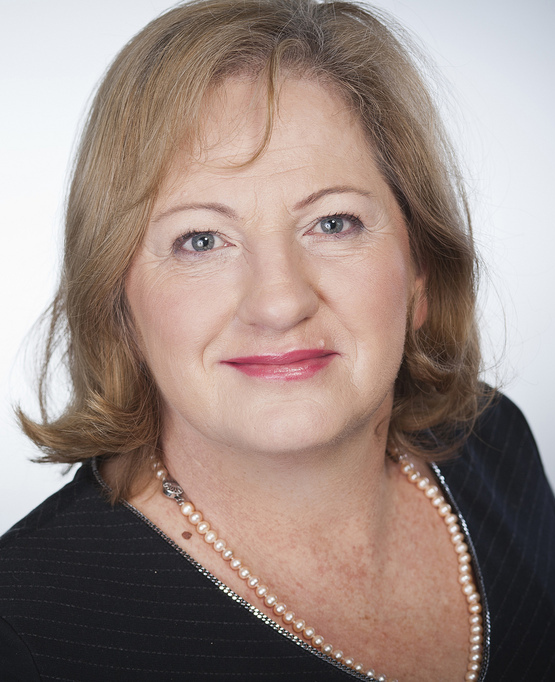

Minister of Culture
- In office 23 December 2011 – 25 March 2015
- Prime Minister: Zoran Milanović
- Preceded by: Jasen Mesić
- Succeeded by: Berislav Šipuš

Personal details
- Born: 13 April 1961 Zagreb, PR Croatia, FPR Yugoslavia
- Died: 28 September 2026 (aged 65) Zagreb, Croatia
- Party: Croatian People's Party – Liberal Democrats
- Education: University of Zagreb

Andrea Zlatar Violić (13 April 1961 – 28 September 2026) was a Croatian politician, literary theorist and editor of literature magazines Vijenac, Zarez and Gordogan.

== Life and career ==
Andrea Zlatar Violić was born in Zagreb, PR Croatia, FPR Yugoslavia on 13 April 1961. She studied humanities at the University of Zagreb, where she earned her Doctorate in 1992.

From 23 December 2011 to 25 March 2015, she served as the Minister of Culture in the centre left Government of Zoran Milanović. She was the second female Minister of Culture in Croatia (after Ljerka Mintas-Hodak). Zlatar-Violić resigned in March 2015 after an internal audit found financial irregularities with herself and other officials not repaying cash taken out for business trips in a timely manner.

In June 2013, while serving as minister of culture, Zlatar-Violić was fined 15,000 Croatian kuna for an undeclared conflict of interest due to the Ministry of Culture financing the magazine Zarez which was published by the firm Druga strana of which she was a part owner. On 2 February 2016, the Administrative Court of Croatia confirmed a verdict that Zlatar-Violić was guilty of conflict of interest when she awarded the web portal Autograf a grant of 70,000 Croatian kuna in 2014 and ordered her to pay 6,000 Croatian kuna to the state. Zlatar Violić was a member of the Croatian People's Party – Liberal Democrats.

Zlatar Violić died in Zagreb on 28 September 2026, at the age of 65.
