= Medal for Participation in Operation Summer '95 =

Croatian medal

Medal for Participation in Operation Summer '95 Medalja Ljeto '95
- Type: Military
- Awarded for: Participation in the Operation Summer '95
- Country: Republic of Croatia
- Presented by: the President of Croatia
- Eligibility: Croatian and foreign citizens
- Status: Active
- Established: 1 April 1995
- Medal for Participation in Operation Summer '95

The Medal for Participation in Operation Summer '95 (Croatian: Medalja Ljeto '95) is a medal awarded by the Republic of Croatia for participation in Operation Summer '95. The medal was founded on 1 April 1995.
