= Tomo Medved =

Croatian politician and retired brigadier general (born 1968)

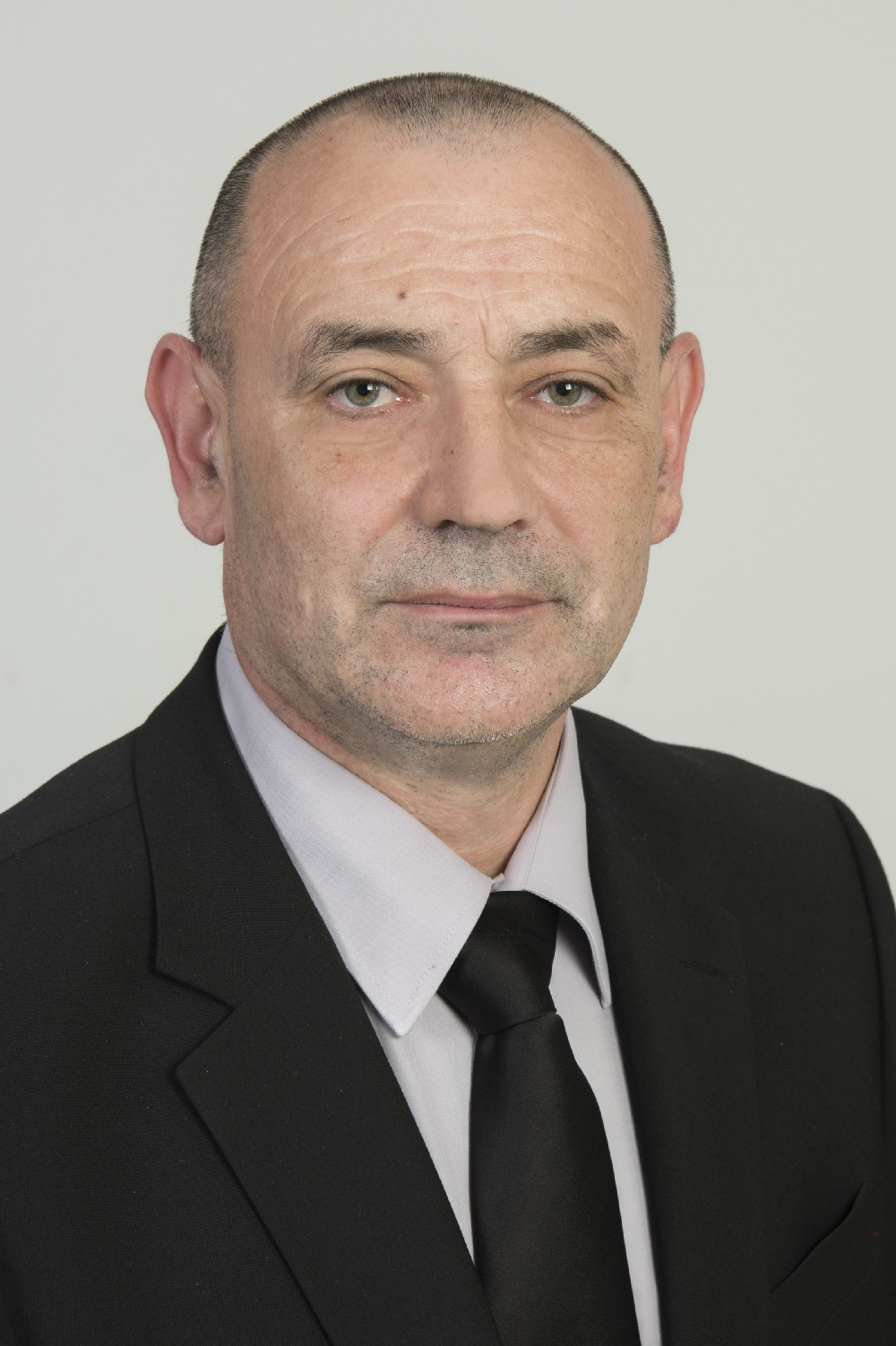
- Medved in 2016

Deputy Prime Minister of Croatia
- Incumbent
- Assumed office 23 July 2020 Serving with Davor Božinović, Oleg Butković, Ivan Anušić, Branko Bačić, David Vlajčić and Tomislav Ćorić
- Prime Minister: Andrej Plenković
- Preceded by: Damir Krstičević

Minister of Croatian Veterans
- Incumbent
- Assumed office 21 March 2016
- Prime Minister: Tihomir Orešković; Andrej Plenković
- Preceded by: Mijo Crnoja

Personal details
- Born: 17 March 1968 (age 58) Šiljkovača, SR Croatia, SFR Yugoslavia (modern Croatia)
- Party: Croatian Democratic Union (2012–present)
- Other political affiliations: Croatian Growth (2011)

Military service
- Branch/service: Croatian Army
- Rank: Brigadier general
- Commands: 2nd Battalion 1st Guards Brigade
- Battles/wars: Croatian War of Independence: Karlovac attack
- Awards: Order of Duke Domagoj Order of the Croatian Cross Order of the Croatian Trefoil Homeland's Gratitude Medal

Tomo Medved (born 17 March 1968) is a Croatian politician and retired brigadier general of the Croatian Army who has served as minister of veterans since 2016 and as deputy prime minister of Croatia since 2020.

== Early life and education ==
Medved was born in Šiljkovača in the municipality of Cetingrad. He graduated from high school in mechanical engineering and worked at Croatian Railways. By professional training, Medved has a professional bachelor's degree, completed business economics and finance at the Baltazar University of Applied Science in Zaprešić, and speaks English.

== Career ==
In November 1990 he volunteered at the 1st Guards Brigade of the MUP in Rakitje. The following year, he was appointed as a platoon commander in the 2nd Battalion of the 1st Guards Brigade, and later as a company commander. He was wounded three times. The first time, at the beginning of the Croatian War of Independence, on 16 August 1991, on the Western Slavonic battlefield, when he was hit by a shrapnel shell in the lungs during the battle. The second time was in October 1991 in Pokupsko, when he received a gunshot wound to the upper arm. They say he considered this a scratch and did not want to leave his comrades at any cost. The third time, in June 1992, he was hit by shrapnel near the spine in the hinterland of Dubrovnik.

After the Croatian War of Independence he held high positions in the Armed Forces, and in July 2006, he assumed the position of adviser to the Chief of Staff of the Armed Forces for the Ground Army. He was the head of the Directorate for Personnel Affairs of the General Staff. He was promoted to the rank of brigadier general in 2009. He retired at his own request in 2011.

He graduated from the Blago Zadro Command and Staff School, Ban Josip Jelačić War School, and the Defense Language Institute in the United States.

He was awarded a number of state awards, such as the Order of Duke Domagoj, the Order of the Croatian Cross, the Order of the Croatian Trefoil, the Homeland's Gratitude Medal for 5 and 10 years, and the Medal for Participation in Operation Summer '95.

On 15 March 2016 then prime minister Tihomir Orešković presented him as the new Minister of Croatian Veterans at a press conference, and the Croatian Parliament confirmed him at the constituent session on 21 March 2016, with 88 votes of support. He continues to hold the position in the first, second and third cabinet of Andrej Plenković. He is also serving as one of the deputy prime ministers since 2020.

== Personal life ==
He had two brothers and five sisters. Both brothers, the older Milan and the younger Ivan, were volunteers during the Croatian War of Independence. Milan was killed in the last days of the war during Operation Storm. Ivan is an active military person in the Armed Forces. Medved is the father of three children.

== Decorations ==
Country	Decoration	Ribbon
Croatia	Order of Duke Domagoj	
Croatia	Order of the Croatian Cross	
Croatia	Order of the Croatian Trefoil	
Croatia	Homeland's Gratitude Medal	
Croatia	Medal for Participation in Operation Summer '95	
