= Ustaše genocide =

Ustaše genocide or Ustasha genocide (Serbo-Croatian: ustaški genocid / усташки геноцид) may refer to:

- Genocide of Serbs in the Independent State of Croatia
- The Holocaust in the Independent State of Croatia
- Genocide of Romani people in the Independent State of Croatia
