= Kresimir Sipusch =

Kresimir Sipusch (Croatian:Krešimir Šipuš; 26 June 1930 – 23 September 2014) was a Croatian composer and conductor, who has often worked in Norway.

== Biography ==
He was born in Zagreb, Croatia.

He is known for promoting contemporary music and composers from the 20th century.

At the Music Academy in Zagreb, he studied composition under Stjepan Sulek. His conducting studies took place under Igor Markevič. His career as a conductor began at the Opera Theatre in Zagreb. He then went to France, where he lived from 1964 to 1972, and was principal conductor of the Symphony Orchestra of Cannes. Then, in 1968, he also became the conductor of the radio orchestra in Zagreb, a position he held until 1974.

From the mid-1970s on, Sipusch worked in Norway. He was the Artistic Director of the State Opera School at the State Opera College from September 1976 to 1996.

He was married to the soprano Guri Egge, daughter of composer Klaus Egge. Sipusch recorded Egge's Cello Concerto.
