= Ministry of Demographics and Immigration =

Ministry of the Croatian government

Ministry of Demographics and Immigration Ministarstvo demografije i useljeništva
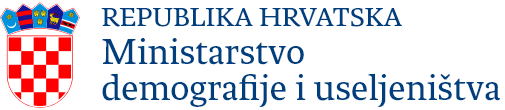

Ministry overview
- Formed: 17 May 2024; 2 years ago
- Type: Ministry in the Government of Croatia
- Jurisdiction: Croatia
- Headquarters: Trg Nevenke Topalušić 1, Zagreb, Croatia
- Employees: 148 (2024)
- Budget: €226.9 million (2025)
- Website: mdu.gov.hr

Minister
- Currently: Ivan Šipić since 17 May 2024

The Ministry of Demographics and Immigration of the Republic of Croatia (Croatian: Ministarstvo demografije i useljeništva) is the ministry in the Government of Croatia which performs professional and other tasks related to monitoring and analysis of demographic trends and changes in the Republic of Croatia, proposes measures aimed at increasing the birth rate, balancing the age structure and encouraging people to stay in Croatia and creates conditions for the return and immigration of members of the Croatian diaspora to Croatia.

== List of ministers ==
=== Minister of Social Planning (1990) ===
Minister	Party	Term start	Term end	Days in office
Stjepan Zdunić	HDZ	30 May 1990	4 October 1990	127

=== Ministers of Emigration (1991–1992) ===
Minister	Party	Term start	Term end	Days in office
Gojko Šušak	HDZ	2 August 1991	18 September 1991	47
Zdravko Sančević	HDZ	2 December 1991	12 August 1992	254

=== Minister of Return and Immigration (1996–1999) ===
Minister	Party	Term start	Term end	Days in office
Marijan Petrović	HDZ	13 November 1996	1 June 1999	930

=== Minister of Development, Immigration and Reconstruction (1999–2000) ===
Minister	Party	Term start	Term end	Days in office
Jure Radić	HDZ	18 May 1999	27 January 2000	254

=== Ministers of Social Politics and Youth (2011–2016) ===
Minister	Party	Term start	Term end	Days in office
Milanka Opačić	SDP	23 December 2011	22 January 2016	1,491
Bernardica Juretić	Ind.	22 January 2016	19 October 2016	271

=== Ministers of Demographics, Family, Youth and Social Policy (2016–2020) ===
Minister	Party	Term start	Term end	Days in office
Nada Murganić	HDZ	19 October 2016	17 July 2019	1,001
Vesna Bedeković	HDZ	22 July 2019	21 July 2020	365

=== Ministers of Demographics and Immigration (2024–) ===
Minister	Party	Term start	Term end	Days in office
Ivan Šipić	DP	17 May 2024	Incumbent	809

== Organization ==
The Ministry has a total of 148 staff (as of 2024), working in the following departments:

Department	Croatian language	Staff
Cabinet of the Minister	Kabinet Ministra	9
General Secretariat	Glavno tajništvo	41
Directorate for Managing Public Policies for Demographic Revitalization and Immigration	Uprava za upravljanje javnim politikama za demografsku revitalizaciju i useljeništvo	36
Directorate for the Implementation of Public Policies for Demographic Revitalization	Uprava za provedbu javnih politika za demografsku revitalizaciju	26
Directorate for the Implementation of Public Immigration Policies	Uprava za provedbu javnih politika za useljeništvo	33
Independent Internal Audit Service	Samostalna služba za unutarnju reviziju	3

== Officials ==
Currently serving officials at the Ministry:

=== Minister ===
- Ivan Šipić, Minister of Demographics and Immigration

=== Secretary General ===
- Marija Balajić, Secretary General of the Ministry of Demographics and Immigration

=== State Secretaries ===
- Frane Tokić
- Željka Josić

=== Heads of sectors ===
- Zvonimir Matković, Head of the Legal and General Affairs and Public Procurement Sector (Načelnik Sektora za pravne i opće poslove i javnu nabavu)
- Ivana Berend, Head of the Finance and Accounting Sector (Načelnica Sektora za financije i računovodstvo)
- Ksenija Slivar, Head of the Sector for Coordination of Public Policies for Demographic Revitalization and Immigration (Načelnica Sektora za koordinaciju javnih politika za demografsku revitalizaciju i useljeništvo)
- Ivana Juričić, Advisor to the Sector for Programs and Projects for Demographic Revitalization and Immigration (Savjetnica Sektora za programe i projekte za demografsku revitalizaciju i useljeništvo)
- Ivana Udovičić, Head of the Department for the Advancement of Pronatal and Demographic Policy (Načelnica Sektora za unaprjeđenje pronatalitetne i demografske politike)
- Ivanka Kunštić, Head of the Sector for Policy Encouraging the Return of Croatian Emigrants and Immigration (Načelnica Sektora za politiku poticanja povratka hrvatskog iseljeništva i useljavanja)
- Mirjana Vatavuk, Head of the Sector for Integration and Immigration Status Issues (Načelnica Sektora za integraciju i statusna pitanja useljenika)
