= Ministry of Public Administration (Croatia) =

Ministry of the Croatian government

Ministry of Public Administration Ministarstvo uprave

Ministry overview
- Formed: 6 July 2009
- Succeeding Ministry: Justice and Public Administration
- Type: Ministry in the Government of Croatia
- Jurisdiction: Croatia
- Headquarters: Maksimirska 63, Zagreb, Croatia
- Employees: 135 (2015)
- Budget: HRK 323 million (2015)
- Website: uprava.gov.hr

The Ministry of Public Administration of the Republic of Croatia (Croatian: Ministarstvo uprave) was the ministry in the Government of Croatia which was in charge of the system and organization of state administration and local and regional governments, political and electoral system, personal status of citizens and other activities within its jurisdiction. It is now defunct as it was merged with the Justice and Public Administration, later renamed the Ministry of Justice, Public Administration and Digital Transformation.

== List of ministers ==
Minister	Party	Term start	Term end	Days in office
Davorin Mlakar	HDZ	6 July 2009	23 December 2011	900
Arsen Bauk	SDP	23 December 2011	22 January 2016	1,491
Dubravka Jurlina Alibegović	Independent	22 January 2016	19 October 2016	271
Ivan Kovačić	Most	19 October 2016	28 April 2017	191
Darko Nekić (acting)	HDZ	28 April 2017	9 June 2017	42
Lovro Kuščević	HDZ	9 June 2017	8 July 2019	759
Ivan Malenica	HDZ	22 July 2019	24 July 2020	368
