= Tihomir Orešković =

Croatian businessman and politician (born 1966)

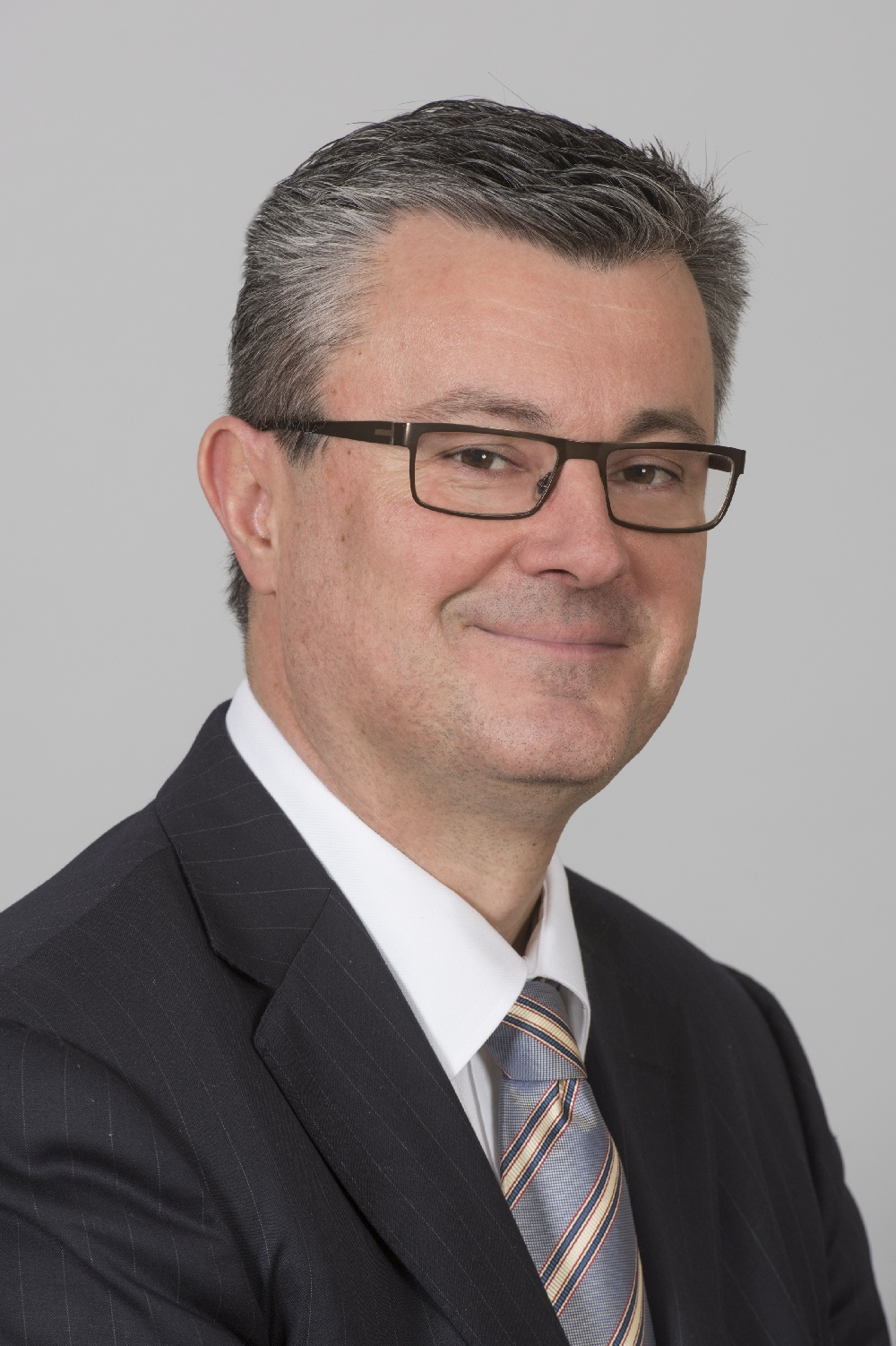
- Official portrait, 2016

Prime Minister of Croatia
- In office 22 January 2016 – 19 October 2016
- President: Kolinda Grabar-Kitarović
- Preceded by: Zoran Milanović
- Succeeded by: Andrej Plenković

Personal details
- Born: 1 January 1966 (age 60) Zagreb, SR Croatia, SFR Yugoslavia (modern Croatia)
- Party: Independent
- Spouse: Sanja Dujmović Orešković
- Children: 4
- Education: McMaster University

Tihomir "Tim" Orešković (Croatian pronunciation: [tîxomiːr tîm ǒreːʃkoʋitɕ]; born 1 January 1966) is a Croatian-Canadian businessman who was Prime Minister of Croatia from January to October 2016, before a no-confidence vote filed by one of the two parties in the ruling coalition brought his government down.

Born in Zagreb, Orešković emigrated to Canada at a young age and spent most of his life there. He studied at McMaster University and graduated with a B.Sc. in chemistry in 1989 and an MBA in finance and information systems in 1991. Before taking office as prime minister, Orešković was CEO and Chairman of the Supervisory Board of Croatian pharmaceutical giant Pliva, as head of European financial management for Israeli Teva Pharmaceutical Industries, and as Chief Financial Officer for Teva's division of global generics.

In the aftermath of a parliamentary election held on 8 November 2015 where no party secured enough seats necessary to form government, and the ensuing 76 days of negotiations, Orešković was named as a technocratic non-partisan compromise for the post of prime minister by the Croatian Democratic Union (HDZ) and the coalition Bridge of Independent Lists (Most) on 23 December 2015. He was formally named Prime Minister-designate on the same day by President Kolinda Grabar-Kitarović. Orešković formed the 13th Croatian Government, made up of two deputy prime ministers and 20 ministers on 22 January 2016.

As prime minister, Orešković introduced fiscal controls aimed at reducing public expenditures and lowering the public debt and deficit. However, his government was marked by tense relations between the two governing parties, with political maneuvering behind the scenes resulting in a government crisis in May 2016. Contrary to expectations that he would take direction from HDZ, the new prime minister went against HDZ recommendations on several occasions. With relations growing acrimonious, HDZ in turn rejected several proposals, including an amendment for reducing benefits of MPs, and the adoption of a new waste management plan.

On 16 June 2016, the HDZ introduced a vote of no-confidence. With 125 MPs voting in favour, 15 voting against, and 2 abstaining, the no-confidence succeeded, the government was brought down and early parliamentary elections were called for September. Although Orešković initially considered running for re-election as a candidate of Most, he returned to the private sector. On 19 October 2016, Orešković was succeeded by the new prime minister, Andrej Plenković from the HDZ.

== Early life and education ==
Orešković was born in Zagreb on 1 January 1966 to Đurđa and Dane Orešković. His parents moved the family to Hamilton, Ontario, Canada, while he was still an infant. In 1989, he graduated from McMaster University with a degree in chemistry, and in 1991, he received his MBA in finance and information systems from the same university. Orešković is married to Sanja Orešković (née Dujmović), also from Zagreb, with whom he has two daughters and two sons.

== Professional career ==
His professional career began in 1992, at American pharmaceutical company Eli Lilly where he held various functions in fields of finance and international business. His last position at the company was that of Director for relations with state administration and economic affairs.

After leaving the company in August 2005, he continued his career at a Canadian pharmaceutical company Novopharm (now: Teva Canada), as VP of Business Development, Specialty Products and CFO. Orešković started working for Pliva in 2009 as CFO for Eastern Europe, the Mediterranean, Israel, and Africa. Orešković holds dual Croatian and Canadian citizenship.

== Political career ==
Orešković was contacted by the Croatian Democratic Union (HDZ) several months before the 2015 parliamentary elections with an offer to potentially take over a ministerial position in the new government in case of HDZ's win. Parliamentary elections were held on 8 November and were followed by eleven weeks of negotiations to select the next prime minister. During this period, HDZ and Bridge of Independent Lists (Most) were deadlocked, each party supporting their own candidate for the top position. Finally, on 23 December 2015, the parties agreed to name Orešković as the compromise candidate for prime minister. Later that day, President Kolinda Grabar-Kitarović handed Orešković the mandate to try and form a government within the following 30 days. Orešković, a self-described fiscal conservative and a centrist, started forming his cabinet with the two parties in January. He named his cabinet on 21 January 2016 and received the vote of confidence from Parliament on 22 January, the last day of the 30-day deadline.

== Premiership (2016) ==
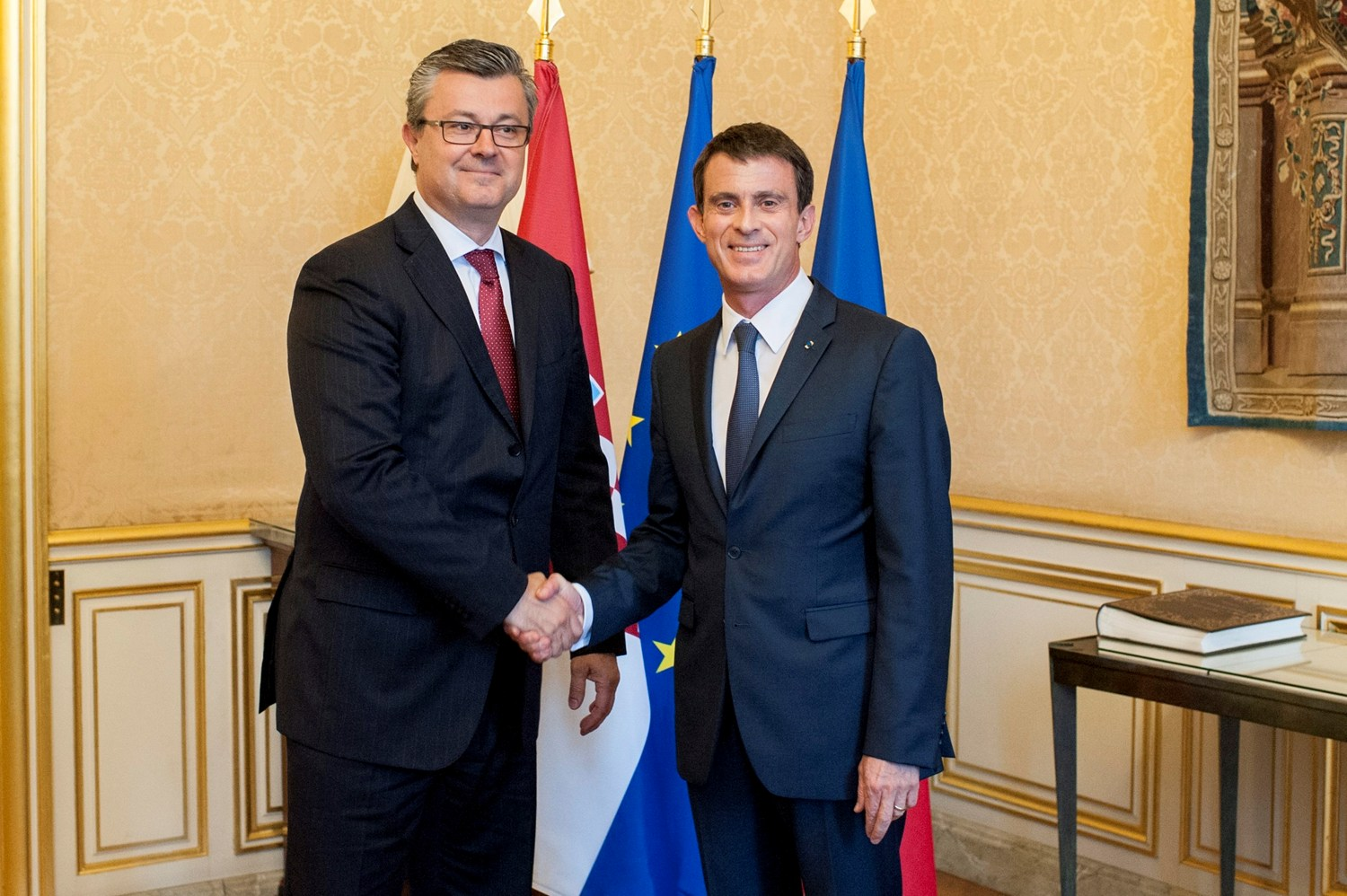
Orešković with French Prime Minister Manuel Valls in Paris, 30 May 2016

The 13th Government of Croatia was approved by votes of 83 MPs, while 61 voted against, and five abstained. Orešković's government had two Deputy Prime Ministers: Tomislav Karamarko, president of HDZ, who acted as the first deputy, and Božo Petrov, president of Most. As Croatia had just emerged from a six-year recession, the main challenges for the new government were cutting public debt, and increasing foreign investments. Orešković predicted his government would achieve GDP growth of 3%, and promised a massive reduction of the public debt, to below 80% of the GDP. Other ambitious goals included: i) bringing down the unemployment rate to 14%; ii) raising country's credit rating; iii) privatization of non-strategic assets; iv) rapid investments in the fields of tourism, as well as energy and infrastructure; v) taxation of unused properties; and vi) increased and more efficient use of EU funds.

On 28 January 2016, Orešković government faced its first political challenge, brought about by the resignation of the Minister of Veterans Affairs Mijo Crnoja only six days into his term It took Orešković almost two months to name his replacement - Tomo Medved was appointed as minister on 21 March 2016.

On 13 March, the Parliament adopted the 2016 budget which projected a deficit below 3%, GDP growth of 2%, and reduction of public debt from 86.9% to 86.8% of GDP. In mid-April, the IMF increased the 2016 GDP growth forecast for Croatia from 1% to 1.9%. In the first quarter of 2016, revenues to the budget increased for 3.7%, and expenditures decreased by 6.5%. GDP growth was 2.7%.

On 22 April 2016, representatives of Jewish and Serb minorities, and an anti-fascist group boycotted the official commemoration for the victims of the Jasenovac concentration camp, protesting what they claimed was government's inadequate reaction to events which were downplaying and revitalizing crimes of the Ustashe regime. In June, Orešković and Economy Minister Tomislav Panenić signed contracts for onshore hydrocarbon exploration and exploitation with oil companies including INA and Vermilion Energy worth an estimated €88 million. Contingent on exploration of gas and oil fields in Slavonia yielding positive results, the projected boost to the state budget was expected to be in the range of €600-€900 million annually. Orešković laso announced the first stage implementation of the Adria LNG terminal on Krk, the Križevci-Dugo Selo railway project worth €200 million, and the Pelješac Bridge worth €430 million. The government adopted a new public procurement bill which replaced the lowest price criterion with the economically most favourable offer. By the end of June 2016, public debt had decreased by 3.9 billion HRK compared to 2015 year end. Budget deficit fell by 5.1 billion HRK in the first six months of 2016, making up 0.7% of GDP. GDP growth reached 2.8% in the second quarter.

=== Government crisis ===
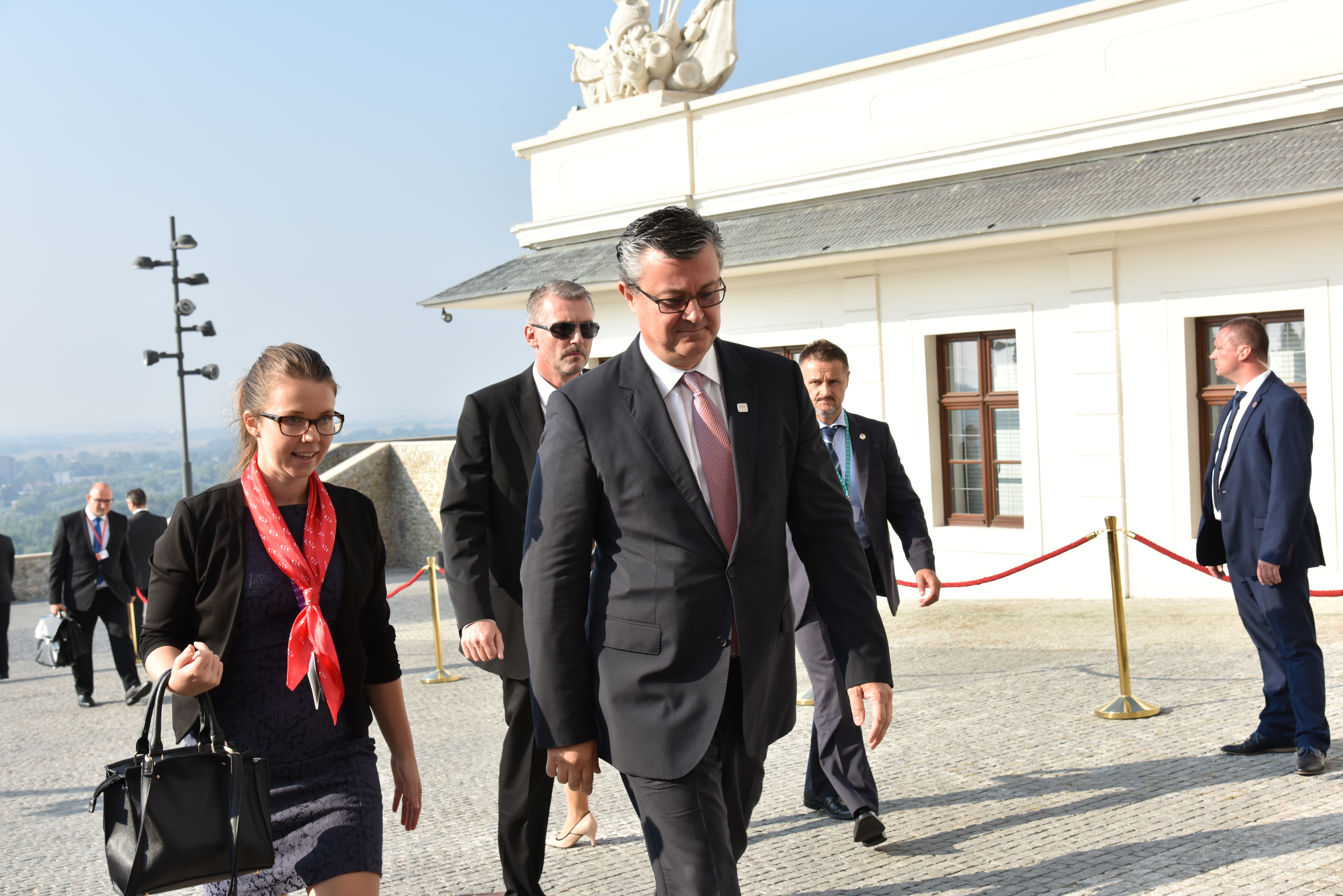
Orešković arriving to the Bratislava Summit, 16 September 2016

From the very beginning, Orešković's cabinet was plagued with tensions between the two governing parties, HDZ and Most, particularly over INA, Croatia's national oil company, and the Ministry of the Interior. Tensions culminated at the end of May 2016, during the conflict of interest affair labeled The Consultant Affair which revealed that Tomislav Karamarko's wife had business contacts with a consultant of the Hungarian oil company MOL which was a party in the arbitration processes with Croatia over INA. As a result, a vote of no confidence against Karamarko was initiated by the Parliamentary opposition, asking for Karamarko to step down, but he refused to do so.

On 3 June 2016, in an attempt to find a solution to the growing crisis, Orešković called on both Karamarko and Petrov to resign their positions for the sake of stability of the country. Petrov was ready to do so, while Karamarko was not. After that, HDZ initiated a vote of no confidence against the Prime Minister and started forming a new majority in the Parliament. Most continued to support Orešković and asked for Karamarko's resignation.

On 15 June 2016, the Commission for Conflict of Interest determined that Karamarko had been in a conflict of interest in The Consultant Affair and Karamarko finally offered his resignation as deputy prime minister, while, at the same time, vowing to challenge the ruling at the Constitutional court. The following day, the Parliament held another no-confidence vote which ended the Orešković government. 125 MPs voted in favor, 15 against, while two abstained. Both the HDZ and most of the opposition voted in favor, while Most MPs voted against. The fall of Orešković's government led to dissolution of Parliament's on 15 July 2016, and an early election in the second half of 2016.

Orešković is the only prime minister in Croatia's modern history without a party affiliation while in office. He is also the wealthiest person to have ever held the position, with a reported net worth of around US$3,2 million as of late February 2016. Having held office for a little under eight months, he was the shortest-serving prime minister of Croatia since Hrvoje Šarinić in 1993 and his term was also the briefest since the replacement of a semi-presidential system with an incomplete parliamentary system in 2000. Orešković was the first, and to date only, Prime Minister to have been forced out of office by a parliamentary motion of no confidence.

Political offices
Preceded by Zoran Milanović	Prime Minister of Croatia; 2016	Succeeded by Andrej Plenković
