= Ministry of Croatian Veterans =

Ministry of the Croatian government

Ministry of Croatian Veterans Ministarstvo hrvatskih branitelja
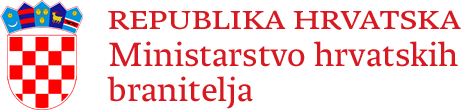

Ministry overview
- Formed: 19 December 1997; 28 years ago
- Type: Ministry in the Government of Croatia
- Jurisdiction: Croatia
- Headquarters: Trg Nevenke Topalušić 1, Zagreb, Croatia
- Employees: 285 (2025)
- Budget: €234.6 million (2025)
- Website: branitelji.gov.hr

Minister
- Currently: Tomo Medved since 21 March 2016

The Ministry of Croatian Veterans of the Republic of Croatia (Croatian: Ministarstvo hrvatskih branitelja, MHB) is a Ministry of the Croatian Government which is split into several directorates:

- Directorate for Family
  - This directorate is further split up into departments for family, children and youth and people with disabilities.
- Directorate for War Veterans
  - This directorate deals with laws relating to Croatian veterans of the nation's Homeland War. These relate to the veterans' rights and their state of health, among other things. The directorate also operates services such as a phone-in line for veterans and scholarships for their children.
- Directorate for Intergenerational Solidarity
  - This directorate safeguards the rights of citizens over 65 years of age.
- Directorate for the Imprisoned and Missing
  - This directorate's purpose is to find the imprisoned and missing from the Homeland War, as well as to exhume and identify the remains of victims of the war.

The current Minister of Croatian Veterans' affairs is Tomo Medved of the Croatian Democratic Union (HDZ).

== List of ministers ==
	Minister	Party	Term start	Term end	Days in office
1	Juraj Njavro	HDZ	19 December 1997	27 January 2000	769
2	Ivica Pančić	SDP	27 January 2000	23 December 2003	1,426
3	Jadranka Kosor^{[nb 1]}	HDZ	23 December 2003	6 July 2009	2,022
4	Tomislav Ivić^{[nb 1]}	HDZ	6 July 2009	23 December 2011	900
5	Predrag Matić	Ind.	23 December 2011	22 January 2016	1,491
6	Mijo Crnoja	HDZ	22 January 2016	28 January 2016	6
—	Vesna Nađ (acting)	SDP	28 January 2016	21 March 2016	53
7	Tomo Medved	HDZ	21 March 2016	Incumbent	3,788

=== Notes ===
nb 1. Served as Minister of Family, Veterans' Affairs and Inter-generational Solidarity
