= United Nations Security Council Resolution 1079 =

UN Security Council Resolution 1079
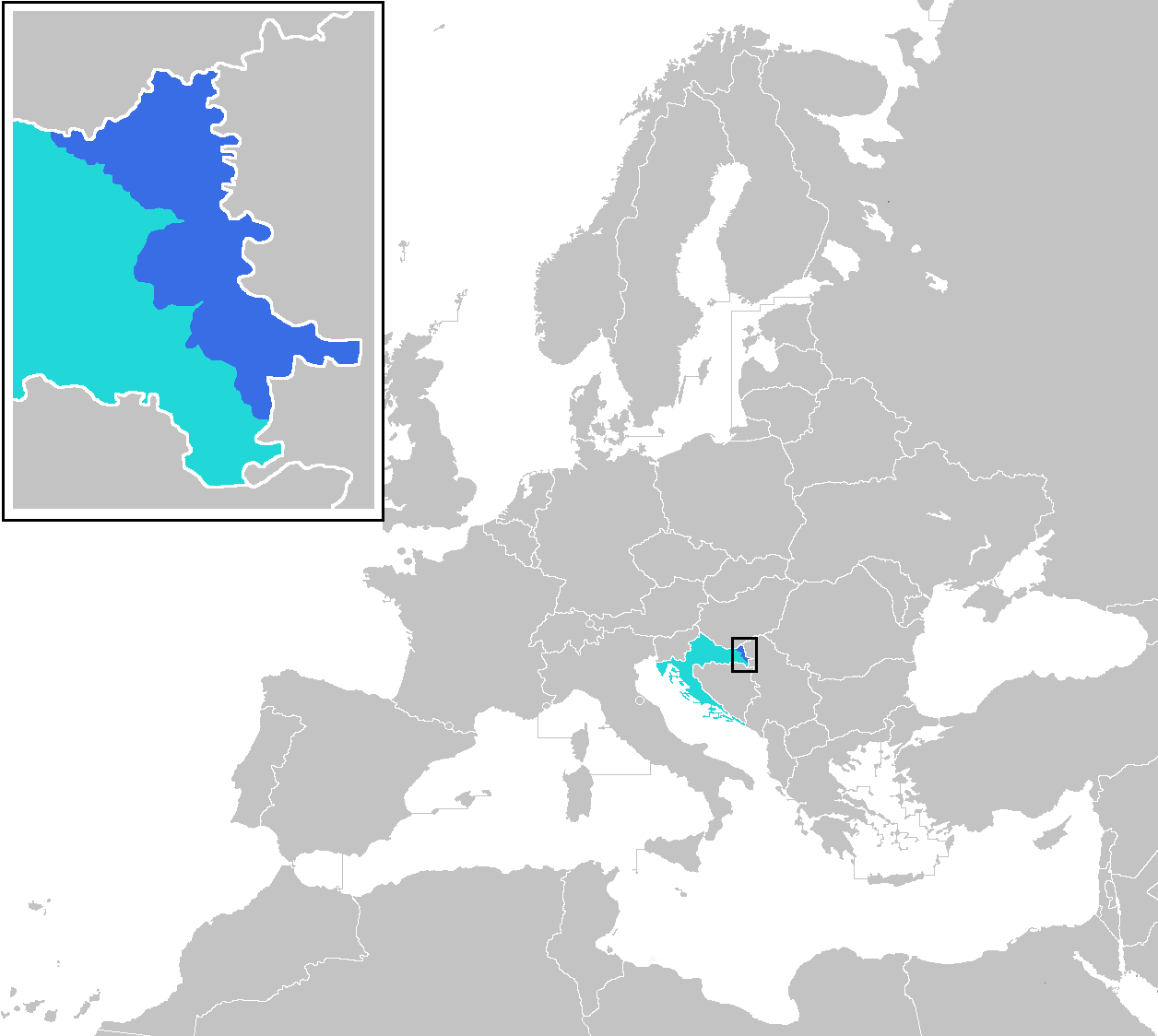
- Eastern Slavonia, Baranja and Western Syrmia governed by the UNTAES administration
- Date: 15 November 1996
- Meeting no.: 3,712
- Code: S/RES/1079 (Document)
- Subject: The situation in Croatia
- Voting summary: 15 voted for; None voted against; None abstained
- Result: Adopted

Security Council composition
- Permanent members: China; France; Russia; United Kingdom; United States
- Non-permanent members: Botswana; Chile; Egypt; Guinea-Bissau; Germany; Honduras; Indonesia; Italy; South Korea; Poland

United Nations Security Council resolution 1079, adopted unanimously on 15 November 1996, after recalling previous resolutions on Croatia including 1023 (1995), 1025 (1995), 1037 (1996), 1043 (1996) and 1069 (1996), the Council extended the mandate of the United Nations Transitional Authority for Eastern Slavonia, Baranja and Western Sirmium (UNTAES) until 15 July 1997.

The Security Council welcomed the progress that UNTAES had made in facilitating the return of the territories to Croatia. The Basic Agreement between Croatia and the local Serbs asked for a temporary United Nations administration for 12 months and that it could be extended for another year at the request of one of the parties, which the local Serbs asked for. The Secretary-General Boutros Boutros-Ghali had requested UNTAES be extended by six months.

Croatia and the local Serb community were called together to work with UNTAES to create circumstances in which local elections could take place. Both also had to comply with the Basic Agreement and to the respect the rights of all ethnic groups. The right of refugees to return home had to be respected while both parties were responsible for the effective functioning of the police.

Finally, the Secretary-General was requested to report on developments by 15 February and 1 July 1997, and to submit recommendations concerning the restructuring of UNTAES and the United Nations presence in Croatia.

== See also ==
- Bosnian War
- Breakup of Yugoslavia
- Croatian War of Independence
- Dayton Agreement
- List of United Nations Security Council Resolutions 1001 to 1100 (1995–1997)
- Yugoslav Wars
- United Nations Transitional Authority for Eastern Slavonia, Baranja and Western Sirmium
- Eastern Slavonia, Baranja and Western Syrmia (1995–1998)
- Joint Council of Municipalities
- List of United Nations Security Council Resolutions related to the conflicts in former Yugoslavia
