= United Nations Security Council Resolution 1120 =

UN Security Council Resolution 1120
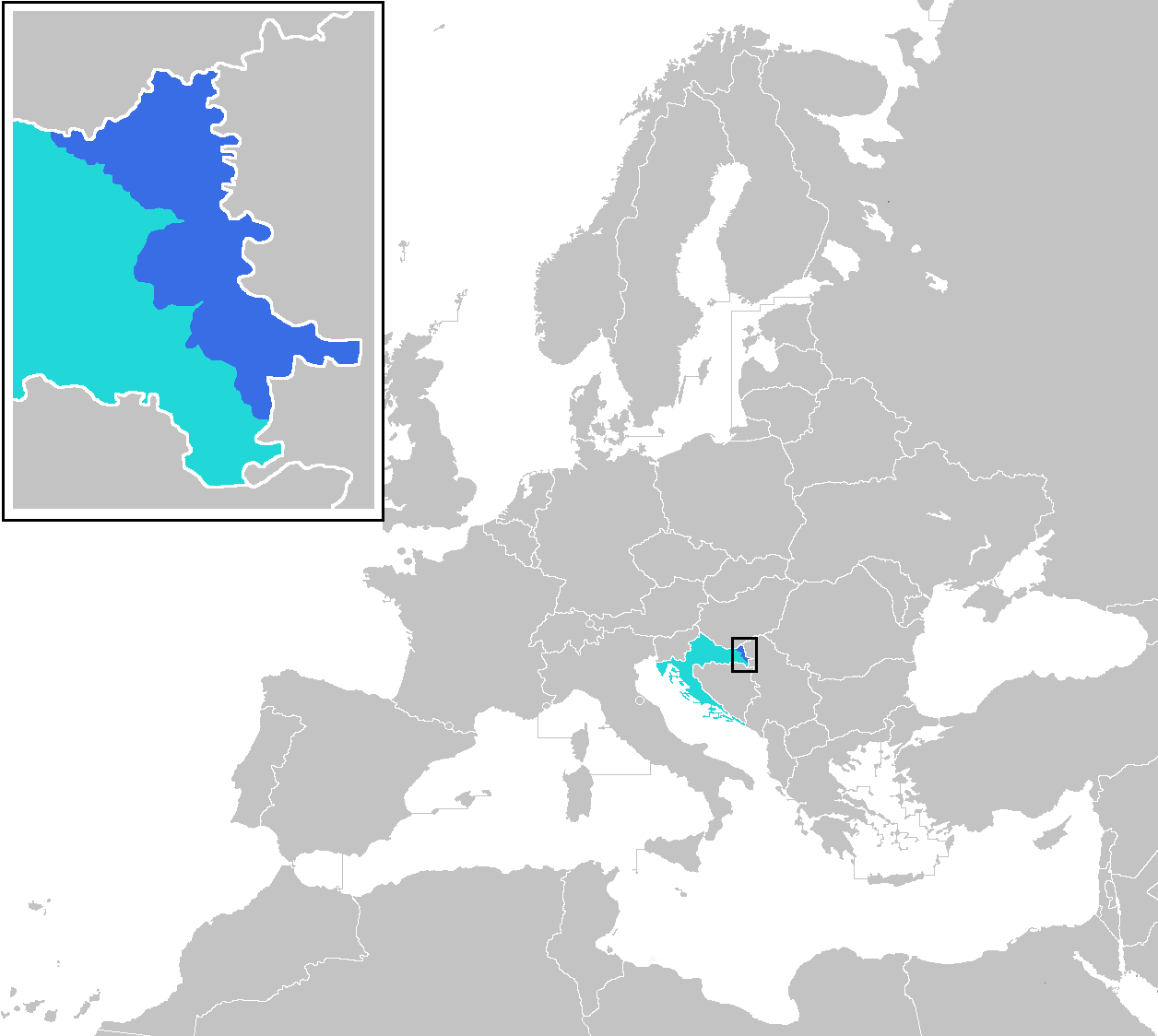
- Eastern Slavonia, Baranja and Western Syrmia region governed by the UNTAES administration
- Date: 14 July 1997
- Meeting no.: 3,800
- Code: S/RES/1120 (Document)
- Subject: The situation in Croatia
- Voting summary: 15 voted for; None voted against; None abstained
- Result: Adopted

Security Council composition
- Permanent members: China; France; Russia; United Kingdom; United States
- Non-permanent members: Chile; Costa Rica; Egypt; Guinea-Bissau; Japan; Kenya; South Korea; Poland; Portugal; Sweden

United Nations Security Council resolution 1120, adopted unanimously on 14 July 1997, after recalling previous resolutions on Croatia including 1023 (1995), 1025 (1995), 1037 (1996), 1043 (1996), 1069 (1996) and 1079 (1996), the Council extended the mandate of the United Nations Transitional Authority for Eastern Slavonia, Baranja and Western Sirmium (UNTAES) until 15 January 1998.

The Croatian regions of eastern Slavonia, Baranja and Western Sirmium were governed by the United Nations mission, UNTAES. In an agreement with the local Serb community in these regions, the safety of all citizens was a priority. It was important that the Government of Croatia allowed refugees and displaced persons to return home safely. There was concern that human rights in the region, including those of ethnic minorities, were not being respected and there was a lack of co-operation with the International Criminal Tribunal for the former Yugoslavia. The detrimental effect of the Amnesty Law was also highlighted by the council, as it had negatively affected confidence and trust among ethnic communities in Croatia.

Acting under Chapter VII of the United Nations Charter, the Council reiterated the importance it attached to the full implementation of all agreements by the parties, and for full co-operation with the United Nations and international organisations. At the same time, the importance of the respect for the human rights of all ethnic groups was stressed, particularly as Croatia was obstructing the return of refugees. Local Serbs in the three regions were reminded to adopt a constructive attitude towards reintegration into the rest of Croatia. All ambiguities within the Amnesty Law were asked to be removed and for it to be implemented fairly.

The Security Council endorsed plans for the restructuring of UNTAES by withdrawing the military component and devolution of executive powers. It was urged to co-operate with the Stabilisation Force authorised in Resolution 1088 (1996) in neighbouring Bosnia and Herzegovina. The Secretary-General was instructed to report to the council by 6 October 1997 on aspects relating to the reintegration of the region. It was important that the area be demilitarised and a liberal border regime was established. Finally, the Croatian government was urged to initiate a national reconciliation programme.

== See also ==
- Breakup of Yugoslavia
- Croatian War of Independence
- Dayton Agreement
- List of United Nations Security Council Resolutions 1101 to 1200 (1995–1997)
- Yugoslav Wars
- United Nations Transitional Authority for Eastern Slavonia, Baranja and Western Sirmium
- Eastern Slavonia, Baranja and Western Syrmia
- Joint Council of Municipalities
- List of United Nations Security Council Resolutions related to the conflicts in former Yugoslavia
