= United Nations Security Council Resolution 1145 =

UN Security Council Resolution 1145
- Medal ribbon for the UNPSG
- Date: 19 December 1997
- Meeting no.: 3,843
- Code: S/RES/1145 (Document)
- Subject: The situation in Croatia
- Voting summary: 15 voted for; None voted against; None abstained
- Result: Adopted

Security Council composition
- Permanent members: China; France; Russia; United Kingdom; United States
- Non-permanent members: Chile; Costa Rica; Egypt; Guinea-Bissau; Japan; Kenya; South Korea; Poland; Portugal; Sweden

United Nations Security Council resolution 1145, adopted unanimously on 19 December 1997, after noting the termination of the mandate of the United Nations Transitional Authority for Eastern Slavonia, Baranja and Western Sirmium on 15 January 1998 in accordance with Resolution 1120 (1997), the Council authorised a support group of 180 civilian police monitors, known as the United Nations Civilian Police Support Group (UNPSG), to observe the situation in eastern Croatia for an additional nine months.

The security council recalled that the Organization for Security and Co-operation in Europe (OSCE) had strengthened its mission in Croatia to include the two-way return of refugees and displaced persons and a focus on the protection of their human rights. At the same time, Croatia had requested a continued presence of United Nations civilian police monitors following the termination of the mandate of UNTAES.

The Croatian government was reminded of its obligations to respect human rights and fundamental freedoms, underlining that the government, police and judicial authorities bore responsibility for this. It was also urged to fulfill its commitments, including those reached with UNTAES. The council also reiterated the right of refugees to return to their homes and welcomed progress made by the Croatian government in this regard, further calling for the removal of legal obstacles and other impediments to two-way returns. At the same time, the local Serb community was reminded of adopting a constructive attitude towards integration with the rest of Croatia.

The security council created, with effect from 16 January 1998, a support group of 180 police observers for a single period of nine months to oversee the police in the Danube region in the northeast of Croatia near the border with Serbia and Montenegro. The observers would specifically monitor the return of displaced persons, and assume responsibility for all UNTAES personnel and assets for the completion of its mandate. Finally, the resolution concluded by requiring the Secretary-General Kofi Annan to report on the situation by 15 June 1998.

== See also ==
- Breakup of Yugoslavia
- Croatian War of Independence
- List of United Nations Security Council Resolutions 1101 to 1200 (1997–1998)
- Yugoslav Wars
- United Nations Transitional Authority for Eastern Slavonia, Baranja and Western Sirmium
- Eastern Slavonia, Baranja and Western Syrmia
- Joint Council of Municipalities
- List of United Nations Security Council Resolutions related to the conflicts in former Yugoslavia
