= United Nations Security Council Resolution 1069 =

UN Security Council Resolution 1069
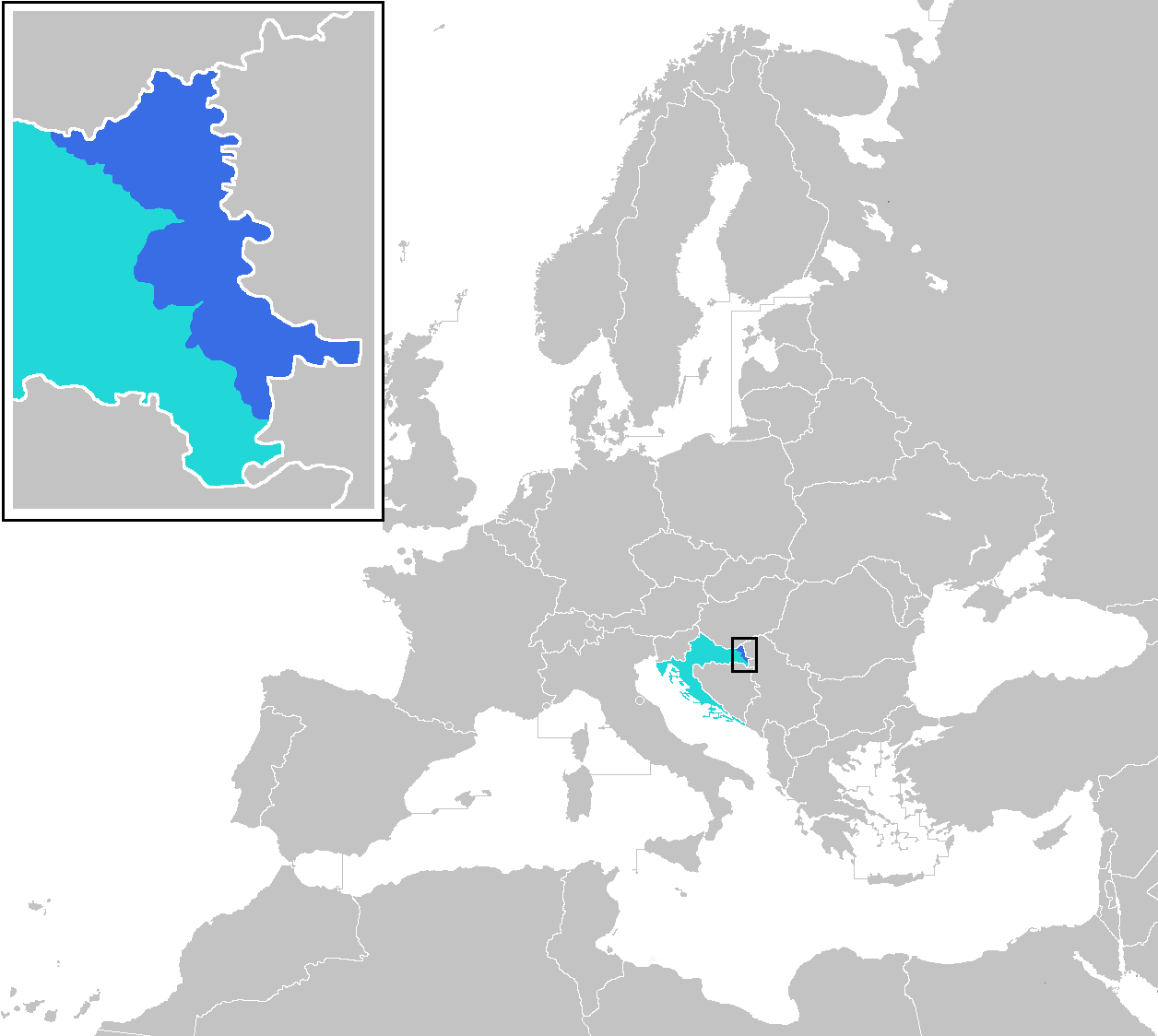
- Eastern Slavonia, Baranja and Western Syrmia governed by the UNTAES administration
- Date: 30 July 1996
- Meeting no.: 3,686
- Code: S/RES/1069 (Document)
- Subject: The situation in Croatia
- Voting summary: 15 voted for; None voted against; None abstained
- Result: Adopted

Security Council composition
- Permanent members: China; France; Russia; United Kingdom; United States
- Non-permanent members: Botswana; Chile; Egypt; Guinea-Bissau; Germany; Honduras; Indonesia; Italy; South Korea; Poland

United Nations Security Council resolution 1069, adopted unanimously on 30 July 1996, after recalling previous resolutions on Croatia including Resolution 1037 (1996) which established the United Nations Transitional Authority for Eastern Slavonia, Baranja and Western Sirmium (UNTAES) and Resolution 1043 (1996) authorising the deployment of military observers, the Council extended the deployment of 100 military observers with UNTAES for a further six months until 15 January 1997.

== See also ==
- Bosnian War
- Breakup of Yugoslavia
- Croatian War of Independence
- Dayton Agreement
- List of United Nations Security Council Resolutions 1001 to 1100 (1995–1997)
- Yugoslav Wars
- United Nations Transitional Authority for Eastern Slavonia, Baranja and Western Sirmium
- Eastern Slavonia, Baranja and Western Syrmia (1995–1998)
- Joint Council of Municipalities
- List of United Nations Security Council Resolutions related to the conflicts in former Yugoslavia
