= United Nations Civilian Police Support Group =

United Nations peacekeeping operation in Croatia from January to October 1998

UNPSG
- United Nations Civilian Police Support Group

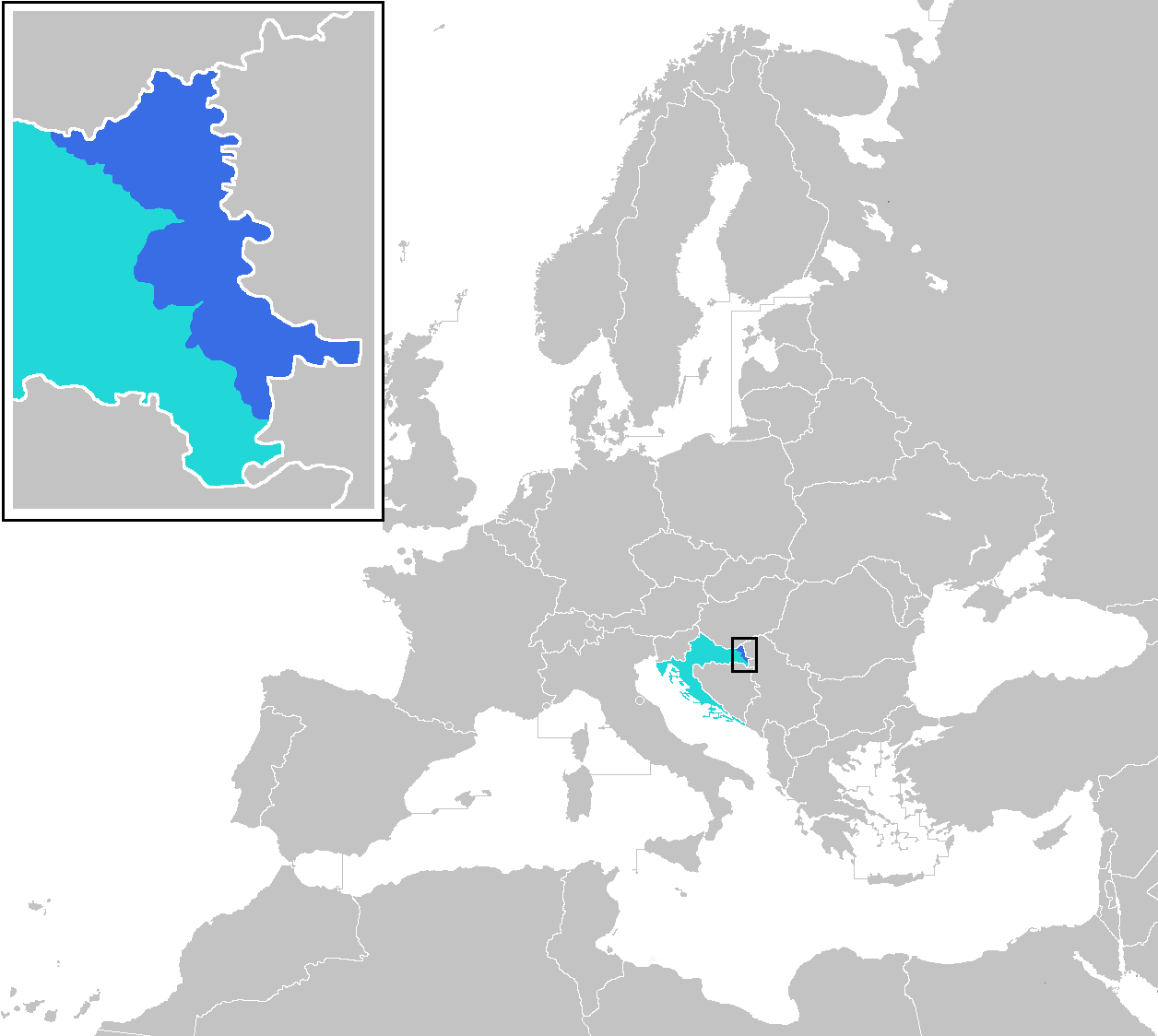
- region served
- Abbreviation: UNPSG
- Predecessor: United Nations Transitional Administration for Eastern Slavonia, Baranja and Western Sirmium
- Formation: 16 January 1998
- Dissolved: 15 October 1998
- Type: Peacekeeping mission
- Headquarters: Zagreb (United Nations Liaison Office) and Vukovar (Police HQs) and the 20 Croatian police stations throughout the Danube region.
- Head of Support Group: Syrian Arab Republic - Souren Seraydarian
- Police Commissioner: Norway - Halvor Hartz

The United Nations Civilian Police Support Group (UNPSG) was a United Nations peacekeeping operation monitoring the performance of the Croatian police in the Danube region from 16 January 1998 to 15 October 1998. The mission was active in the same area of the former parallel Eastern Slavonia, Baranja and Western Syrmia which was previously directly governed by the UNTAES transitional administration between 1996 and 1998. The mission took over vehicles, equipment and other support assets from UNTAES. UNPSG was not the first CIVPOL engagement in the region as earlier missions of UNPROFOR, UNCRO and UNTAES all included civilian police components.

The United Nations Security Council authorised the mission in United Nations Security Council Resolution 1145 on 19 December 1997. There was in 114 police officers supported by international and local civilian staff coming from Argentina, Austria, Denmark, Egypt, Fiji, Finland, Indonesia, Ireland, Jordan, Kenya, Lithuania, Norway, Poland, Russian Federation, Sweden, Switzerland, Ukraine and United States. The mission cooperated with the OSCE Mission to Croatia which was active in the region at the same time.

== See also ==
- United Nations Police
