= OSCE Mission to Croatia =

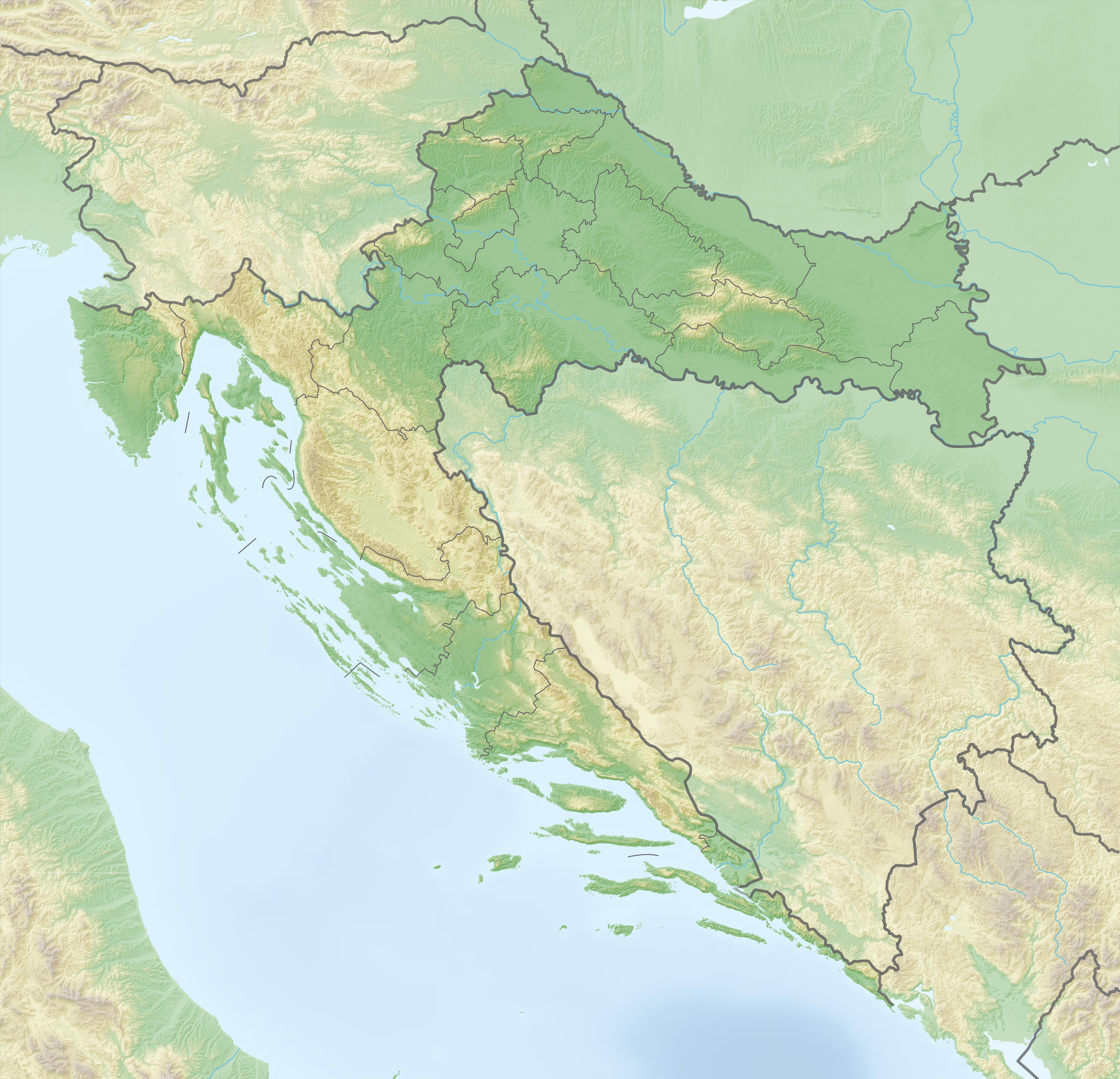
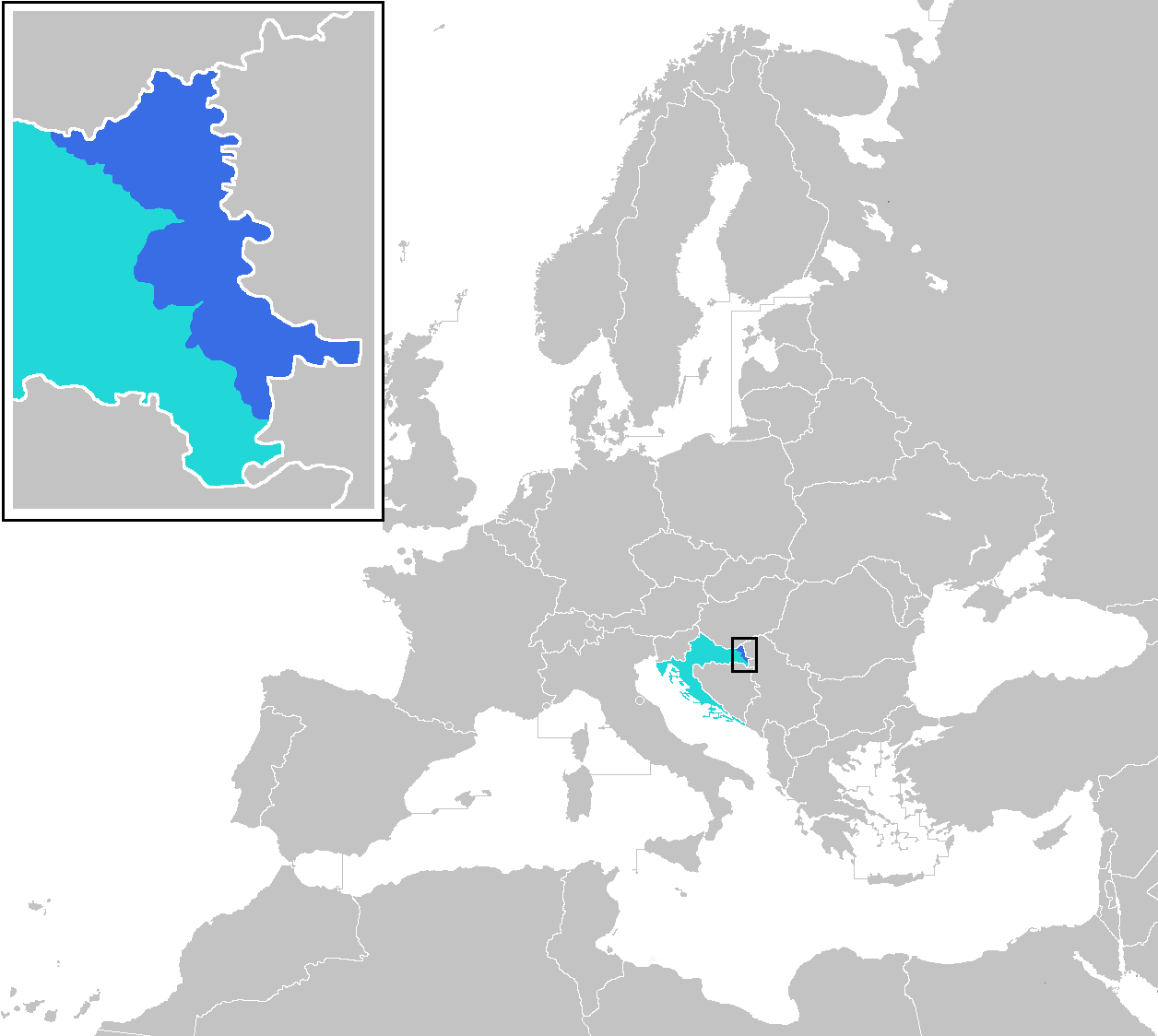
- Relief Map of Croatia and the map of the focus region in eastern Croatia (Podunavlje)
- Successor: OSCE Office in Zagreb
- Formation: 1996
- Dissolved: 2007
- Headquarters: Zagreb, Croatia
- Region served: Croatia, with special focus on former Eastern Slavonia, Baranja and Western Syrmia UN protectorate
- Parent organization: Organization for Security and Co-operation in Europe
- Budget: €21,086,900 (2000)
- Staff: 600 (280 international personnel and 320 national staff) (1999)

OSCE Mission to Croatia was the field mission of the Organization for Security and Co-operation in Europe operating in Croatia in from July 1996 until the December 2007. The Mission become preeminent international organization in Croatia after the departure of UNTAES forces from the Eastern Slavonia, Baranja and Western Syrmia.

== History ==
The mission was supposed to last until the 1999 and it consisted of 280 international personnel (including 120 police monitors) and 320 national staff deployed in twenty field offices and three regional coordination centers as well as the Zagreb headquarters. The first mandate adopted by the Permanent Council in April 1996 authorized the Mission to "provide assistance and expertise to the Croatian authorities at all levels, as well as to interested individuals, groups and organisations, in the field of the protection of human rights and of the rights of the persons belonging to national minorities. In this context and in order to promote reconciliation, the rule of law and conformity with the highest internationally recognised standards, the Mission will also assist and advise on the full implementation of legislation and monitor the proper functioning and development of democratic institutions, processes and mechanisms". On the 14 July 1997 United Nations Security Council Resolution 1120 urged the Government of the Republic of Croatia to cooperate fully with the OSCE mission in return of all refugees and displaced persons, protection of their rights, and the protection of persons belonging to national minorities. The annual budget of the Mission in 2000 was €21,086,900.

Along the Zagreb headquarters mission was operating from three co-ordination Centres in Vukovar, Sisak and Knin and 14 field offices. In the region of former Eastern Slavonia, Baranja and Western Syrmia mission operated the Police Monitoring Group in the 1998-2000 period but close it down in September 2000 due to the stable security situation in Croatia and notably in the Danube region.

On 21 December 2007, the OSCE Permanent Council decided to close the OSCE Mission to Croatia, on 31 December 2007, and keeping only an OSCE Office in Zagreb. This office was closed on 17 January 2012. Croatia became a full member state of NATO in 2009 and the European Union in 2013.

== See also ==
- United Nations Civilian Police Support Group
- High Commissioner on National Minorities
- Human rights in Croatia
- Breakup of Yugoslavia
- Croatian War of Independence
- Kosovo Verification Mission
- OSCE Minsk Group
