= 1997 Eastern Slavonia integrity referendum =

- 6 April 1997
- Do you want Eastern Slavonia to remain a single unit?
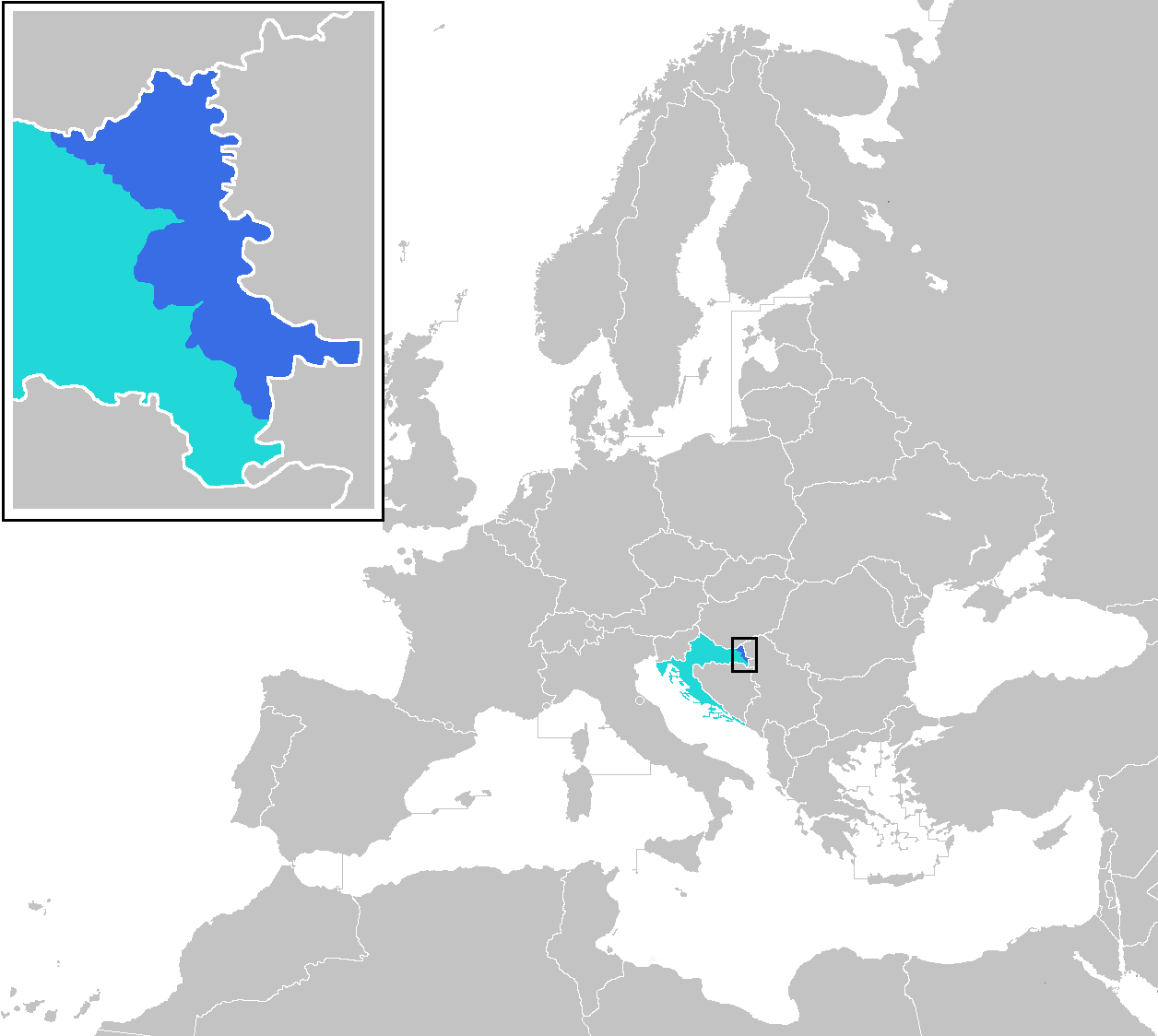
- Eastern Slavonia, Baranja and Western Syrmia

Results
Choice	Votes	%
Yes	76,845	99.01%
No & Invalid	768	0.99%
Valid votes	77,613	100.00%
Invalid or blank votes	0	0.00%
Total votes	77,613	100.00%
Registered voters/turnout	100,275	77.4%

1997 Eastern Slavonia integrity referendum was held on 6 April in short-lived Serb parallel entity of Eastern Slavonia, Baranja and Western Syrmia which at the time was already governed by the United Nations Transitional Administration for Eastern Slavonia, Baranja and Western Sirmium (UNTAES) as an UN governed territory. Voters were asked whether they supported the proposal for the region of Eastern Slavonia to remain a single territorial oblast within Croatia after the end of UNTAES mandate instead of division into Vukovar-Syrmia and Osijek-Baranja County. Reportedly 99.01% or 99.5% of voters voted for the integrity of the region within Croatia. 77,40% out of 100.275 registered voters participated in the referendum.

The Government of Croatia as well as the United Nations declared the referendum to be illegitimate. Referendum was organized by the parallel Serb bodies in the region ahead of the 1997 Croatian local elections with Spokesperson for the United States Department of State R. Nicholas Burns encouraging all citizens of Croatia, Croats and Serbs, to participate in Croatian local elections. Despite the referendum outcome Serbs in the region nonetheless participated in Croatian local elections and a new moderate Serb political party Independent Democratic Serb Party won majority of their votes.

From the beginning the referendum initiative was perceived as an internal political struggle between the moderates (at the time led by Vojislav Stanimirović) and hawkish (led by Goran Hadžić) group among the local Serb political leadership. While hawkish proposal gained overwhelming electorate support, contrary to the war years moderates managed to prevail due to international support for the moderate course, and additional change of position towards moderates both by parties which will form the Democratic Opposition of Serbia and Slobodan Milošević regime.

Following the referendum, Vojislav Stanimirović met with the President of Croatia Franjo Tuđman where he stated his belief that "the best option would be a Serb county, but if neither Croatia nor the international community is willing to accept it then the formation of the council of Serb municipalities as planned in Erdut Agreement is the second-best option".

== See also ==
- 1997–1998 crisis in Republika Srpska
- Erdut Agreement
- 1991 Croatian independence referendum
- Z-4 Plan
- Operation Storm
