= United Nations Security Council Resolution 1037 =

UN Security Council Resolution 1037
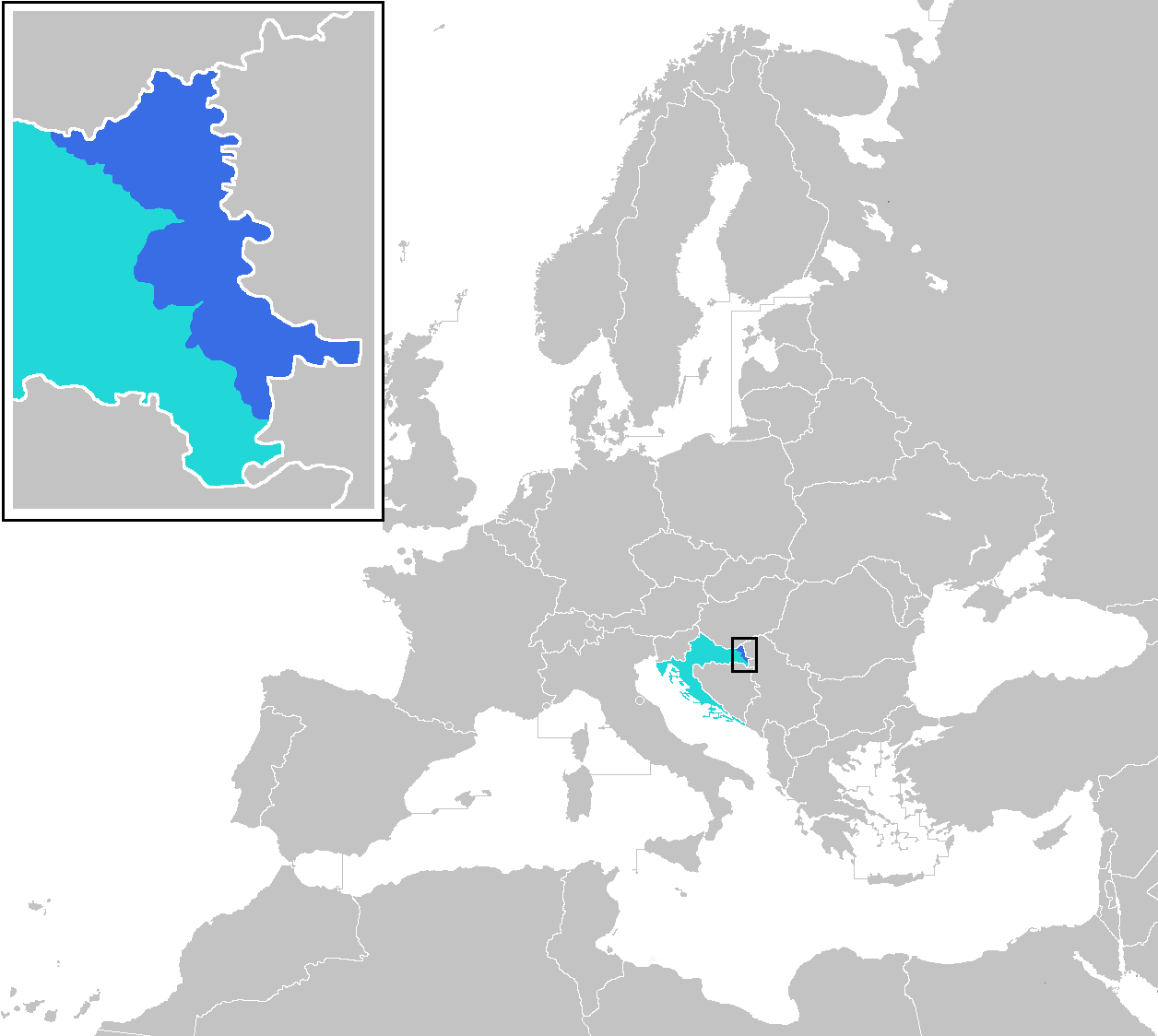
- Eastern Slavonia, Baranja and Western Syrmia governed by the UNTAES administration
- Date: 15 January 1996
- Meeting no.: 3,619
- Code: S/RES/1037 (Document)
- Subject: The situation in Croatia
- Voting summary: 15 voted for; None voted against; None abstained
- Result: Adopted

Security Council composition
- Permanent members: China; France; Russia; United Kingdom; United States
- Non-permanent members: Botswana; Chile; Egypt; Guinea-Bissau; Germany; Honduras; Indonesia; Italy; South Korea; Poland

United Nations Security Council resolution 1037, adopted unanimously on 15 January 1996, after recalling previous resolutions on Croatia including resolutions 1023 (1995) and 1025 (1995), the council established the United Nations Transitional Authority for Eastern Slavonia, Baranja and Western Syrmia (UNTAES) for an initial period of 12 months.

The council began by reaffirming that Eastern Slavonia, Baranja and Western Syrmia (known as Sector East) were integral parts of Croatia and that respect for human rights and fundamental freedoms was important. Support was given to the Basic Agreement was signed on 12 November 1995 between the Government of Croatia and local Serbs. In the aftermath of the Operation Storm resolution called upon parties to "refrain from any unilateral actions". It was important that all countries in the former Yugoslavia recognised each other.

Acting under Chapter VII of the United Nations Charter, it was decided that UNTAES would operate in the three regions for an initial period of a year with both military and civilian components. The Secretary-General Boutros Boutros-Ghali was asked to appoint a director. Demilitarisation would be complete within 30 days after the deployment of the military component of UNTAES. 14 days after the date on which demilitarisation was to be completed, a review would take place on the willingness of the parties to implement the Basic Agreement. If the Secretary-General reported that the parties were not meeting their obligations, it would review the mandate of UNTAES. He was also requested to report to the council by 15 December 1996 on UNTAES and the implementation of the Basic Agreement.

The Security Council that the military component of UNTAES would consist of an initial force of up to 5,000 personnel with the following mandate:

(a) monitor and assist in demobilisation, complete by 20 June 1996;
(b) oversee the return of refugees and displaced persons;
(c) contribute to peace in the region by its presence;
(d) help with the implementation of the Basic Agreement.

It was also decided that the civilian component would have the following mandate:

(a) establish a temporary police force by July 1996 of around 600 personnel and oversee the prison system;
(b) undertake tasks relating to civil administration;
(c) undertake tasks relating to the public services;
(d) support the return of refugees;
(e) verify and organise elections for April 1997;
(f) undertake other tasks, such as economic reconstruction.

UNTAES would monitor compliance of the parties with the agreement, respect for human rights and promote an atmosphere of confidence. Member States were also authorised to provide air support to protect UNTAES. It was requested that UNTAES co-operate with the Implementation Force authorised in Resolution 1031 (1995) and for all states to co-operate with the International Criminal Tribunal for the former Yugoslavia established in Resolution 827 (1993).

Finally, the resolution concluded by asking the Secretary-General to consider ways in which Croatia could contribute to the cost of UNTAES.

== See also ==
- Bosnian War
- Breakup of Yugoslavia
- Croatian War of Independence
- List of United Nations Security Council Resolutions 1001 to 1100 (1995–1997)
- Yugoslav Wars
- United Nations Transitional Authority for Eastern Slavonia, Baranja and Western Sirmium
- List of territories administered by the United Nations
- Joint Council of Municipalities
- List of United Nations Security Council Resolutions related to the conflicts in former Yugoslavia
