= United Nations Transitional Administration for Eastern Slavonia, Baranja and Western Sirmium =

UN-administered territory from 1996 to 1998

United Nations Transitional Administration for Eastern Slavonia, Baranja and Western Sirmium: Prijelazna uprava Ujedinjenih naroda za istočnu Slavoniju, Baranju i zapadni Srijem (Croatian) Прелазна управа Уједињених нација за источну Славонију, Барању и западни Срем (Serbian) Official languages of the United Nations: إدارة الأمم المتحدة الانتقالية في سلافونيا الشرقية وبارانيا وسيرميوم الغربية (Arabic) Administration transitoire des Nations unies pour la Slavonie orientale, la Baranja et le Srem occidental (French) Временная администрация Организации Объединённых Наций для Восточной Славонии, Бараньи и Западного Срема (Russian) Administración de Transición de las Naciones Unidas en Eslavonia Oriental, Baranya y Sirmia Occidental (Spanish) 联合国东斯拉沃尼亚、巴拉尼亚和西锡尔米乌姆过渡行政当局 (Chinese); UNTAES
- 1996–1998
- Flag Coat of arms

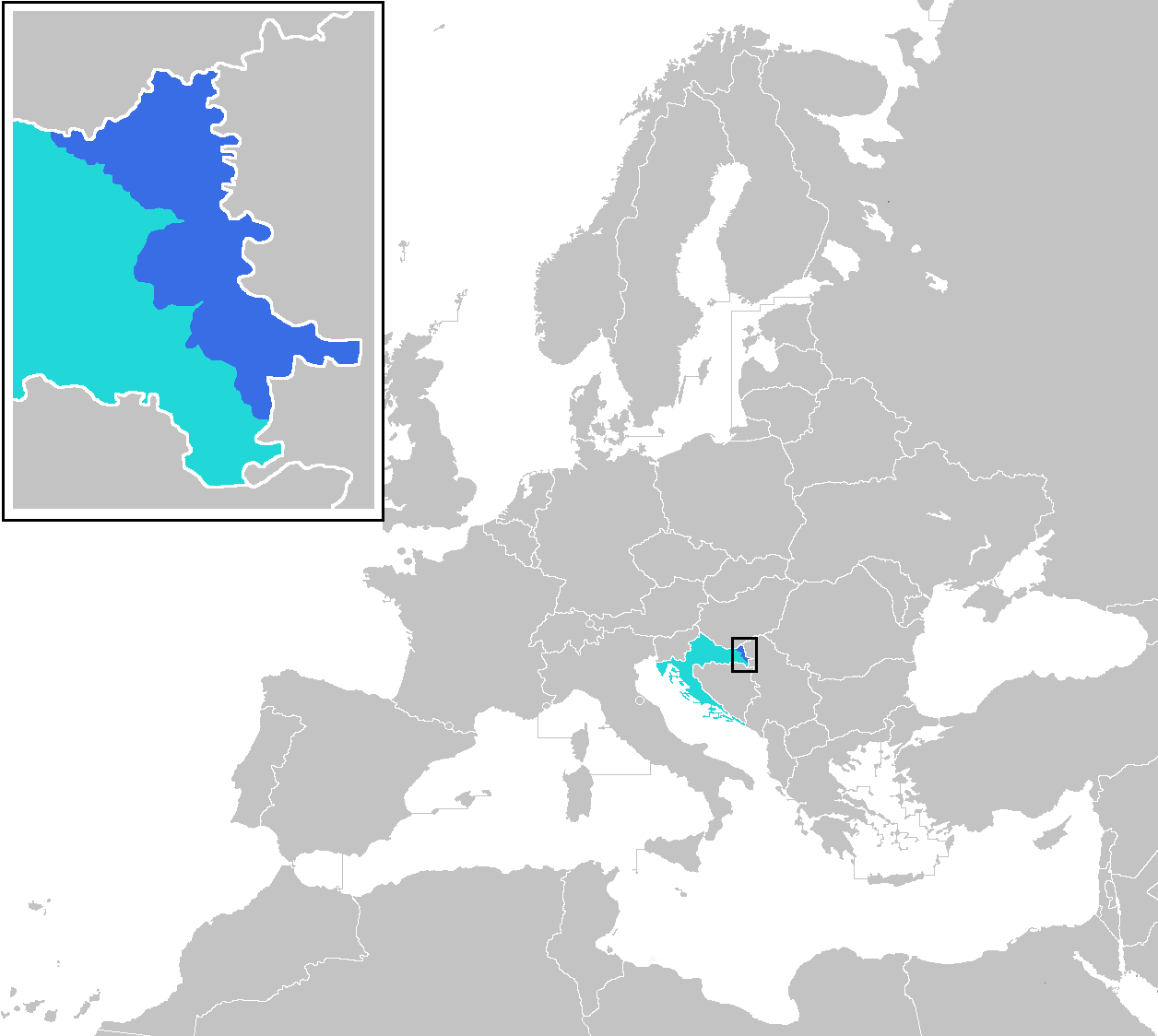
- Status: United Nations governed territory
- Headquarters: Vukovar
- Official languages: Croatian, Serbian and the official languages of the United Nations (primarily English)
- Head Administrator of the Region
  - 1996–1997: Jacques Paul Klein
  - 1997–1998: William Walker
- History
  - Established: 1996
  - Disestablished: 1998

Area
  - Total: 2,600 km^{2} (1,000 sq mi)

Population
  - 1991 estimate: 193,513
Preceded by	Succeeded by
United Nations Confidence Restoration Operation in Croatia; Eastern Slavonia, Baranja and Western Syrmia (1995–1998)	Croatia; United Nations Civilian Police Support Group

United Nations Transitional Administration for Eastern Slavonia, Baranja and Western Sirmium

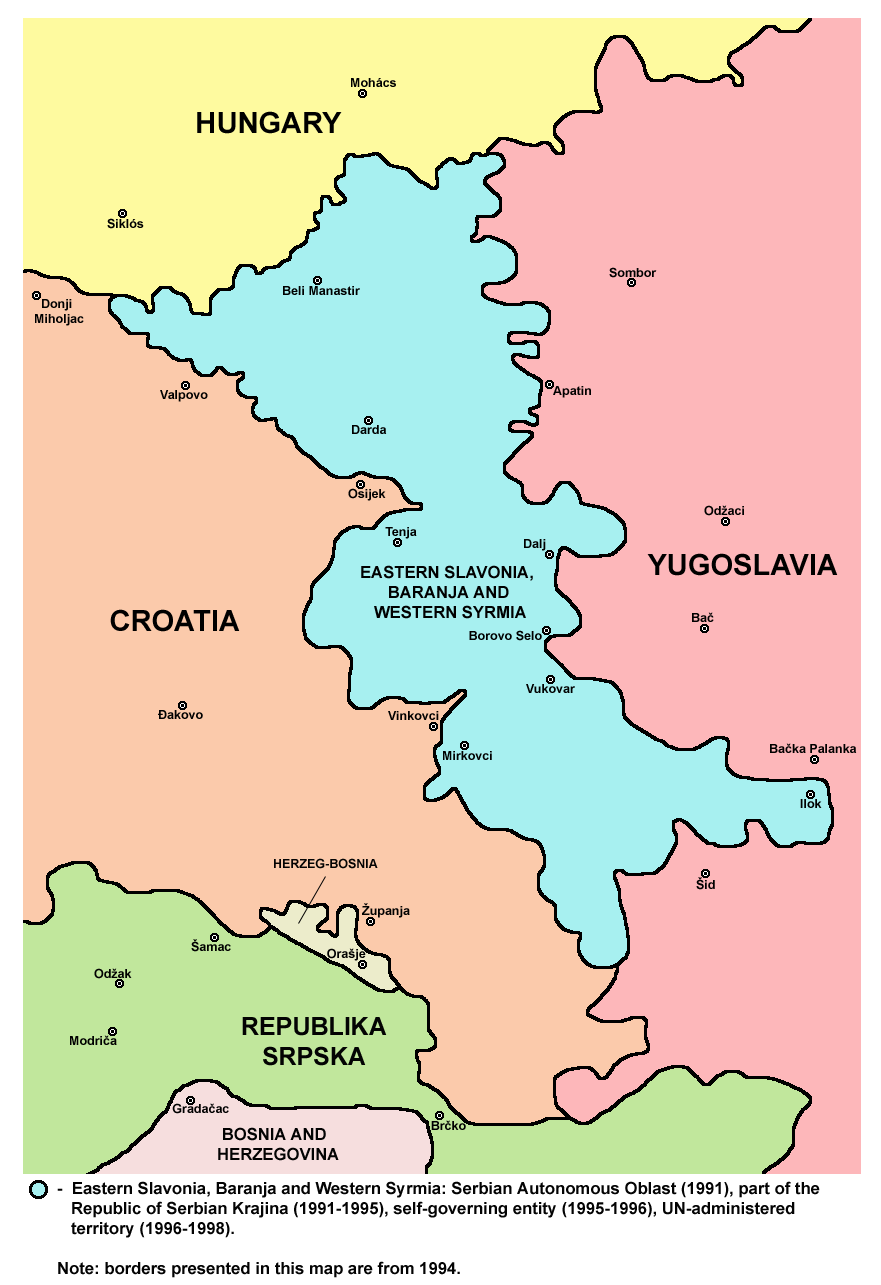
- Eastern Slavonia, Baranja and Western Syrmia
- Abbreviation: UNTAES
- Formation: January 15, 1996
- Dissolved: January 15, 1998
- Type: Peacebuilding transitional administration
- Legal status: Completed
- Headquarters: Vukovar; Beli Manastir (liaison office; initially Zagreb)
- Head: Jacques Paul Klein; William Walker
- Parent organization: United Nations Security Council
- Website: United Nations Transitional Administration for Eastern Slavonia, Baranja and Western Sirmium

The United Nations Transitional Administration for Eastern Slavonia, Baranja and Western Sirmium (UNTAES) was a UN peacebuilding transitional administration in Eastern Slavonia, Baranja and Western Syrmia, in the eastern parts of Croatia (multicultural Danube river region). The transitional administration lasted between 1996 and 1998. The transitional administration was formally established by the United Nations Security Council Resolution 1037 of January 15, 1996. The transitional administration was envisaged and invited in the November 1995 Erdut Agreement between the Croatian Government and the representatives of the local Serb community in the region. At the time of UNTAES deployment the region already hosted another traditional type UN peacekeeping mission known as the UNCRO. While the region was covered under the UNCRO's sector east (sector led by Russian and Belgian forces), the whole UNCRO mission was brought into question by the Operation Storm escalation of hostilities.

UNTAES is only the third UN peacekeeping mission in history (after UNTEA in Western New Guinea and UNTAC in Cambodia) where the UN assumed direct and high executive powers in the territory of concern. Via UNTAES, the United Nations temporarily took the role of governance in the region by creating a UN protectorate. At the end of the UNTAES deployment an additional monitoring support mission was provided for the region under the name of the United Nations Civilian Police Support Group.

== History ==
=== Pre-establishment events ===
After Operation Storm in mid-1995, the only remaining part of the self-proclaimed proto-state Republic of Serbian Krajina was the area in eastern Croatia along the Danube river. Contrary to Krajina mainland, Eastern Slavonia, Baranja and Western Syrmia shared a long border with the Federal Republic of Yugoslavia (its constituent Republic of Serbia). It was also economically and socially dependent and politically much more closely aligned with authorities in Belgrade and Novi Sad than Krajina. This led the international community to believe that Croatian intervention in Eastern Slavonia case would trigger a military reaction from Serbia and result in an escalation of hostilities. At the same time, the military defeat of Krajina and signing of the Washington Agreement opened the space to resolve the armed conflict in Bosnia which the US Administration wanted to use for political benefits before the 1996 United States presidential election.

In the context of successful Croatian military interventions of Bljesak and Oluja, the initial idea that the region of Eastern Slavonia could be integrated back to Croatia through peaceful means was perceived with astonishment on Croatian side and as a form of pressure from the international community. The Croatian military establishment held informal talks about preparation of a military solution for the region under the code name "Skok u Dalj" ("Jump to Dalj"). There was lack of enthusiasm and belief that peaceful process would be successful among the involved parties and other states in the region, themselves recently involved in Yugoslav Wars.

The Erdut Agreement between the Croatian Government and the representatives of the Serbs in the region was signed in November 1995, which requested that the UN form a transitional authority and a peacekeeping force. United Nations Security Council Resolution 1023 supported that, and after the UNCRO mission was terminated in the United Nations Security Council Resolution 1025, UNTAES was set up to serve as a United Nations protectorate over the region in Resolution 1037. Reintegration of the region, the last part of the country outside the control of the central government and arguably geopolitically the most sensitive part of the former self-proclaimed Republic of Serbian Krajina, was the most important Croatian condition for participation in Dayton Peace Negotiations. The subsequent Dayton Agreement for peace in Bosnia ended the deadliest conflicts of the Yugoslav wars.

=== Transitional Administration ===
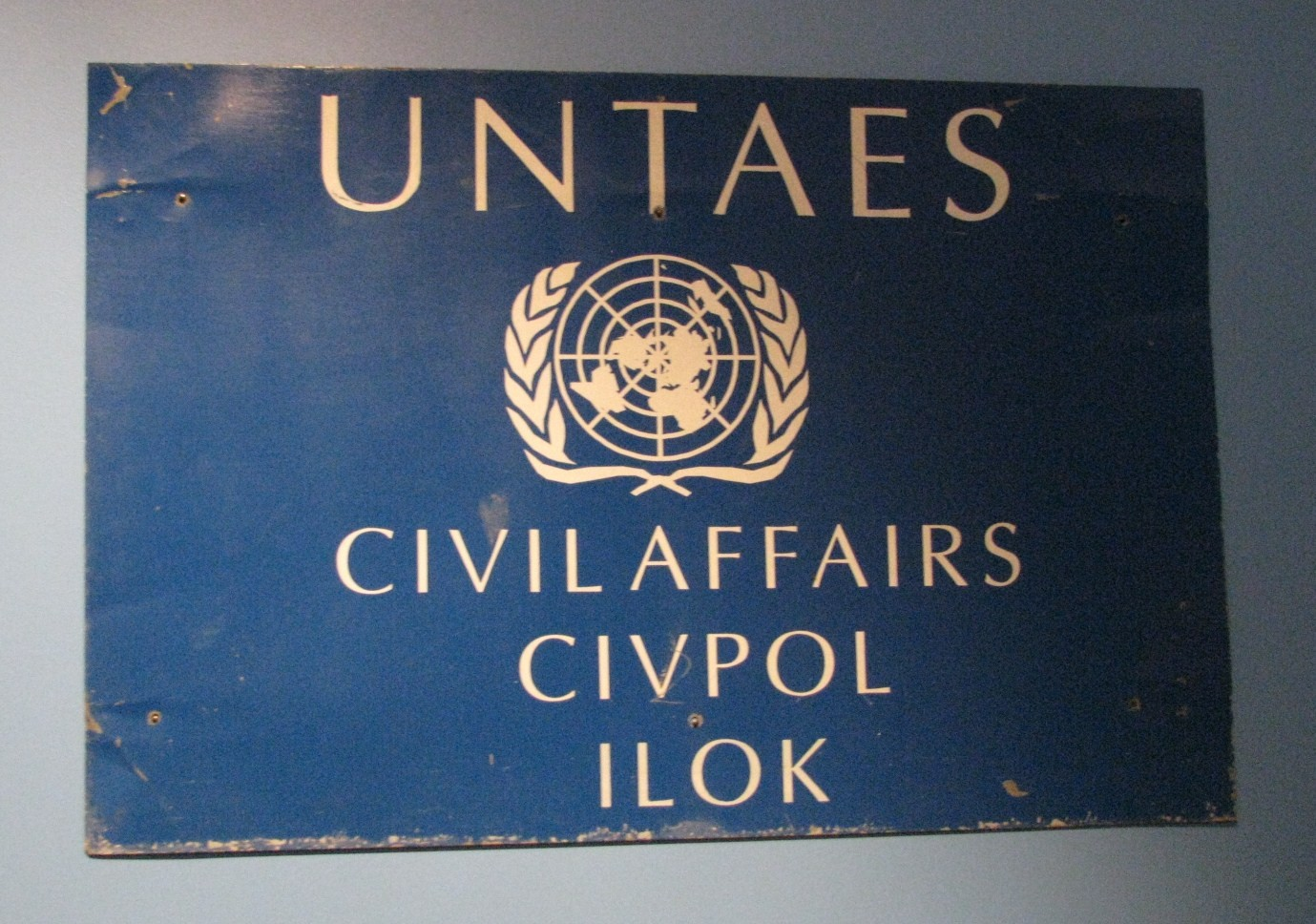
UNTAES table in Ilok

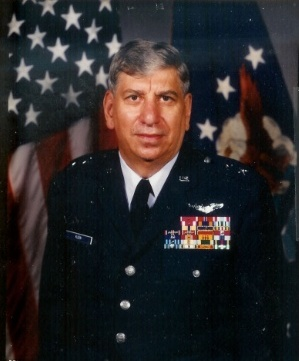
Major General Jacques Paul Klein, head of the mission

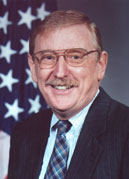
William Walker, second head of the mission from August 1997

The transitional administration started its operations on January 15, 1996, with the United Nations Security Council Resolution 1043. It was meant to last for one year, with a provision for an extension of the mandate for up to one year at the request of either party. Administration's main task was to monitor demilitarization and ensure peaceful reintegration of the territory into Croatia. UN Secretary General initially proposed that UNTAES should have 9,300 soldiers. By the final agreement the administration had a military and a civilian component with 5,000 soldiers, 500 UNTAES civilian police (UNCIVPOL) and 99 military observers. At its full deployment UNTAES consisted of 4849 soldiers, 99 military observers and 401 civil police members, close to the agreed number.

Before the arrival of UNTAES troops in region there were already 1,600 troops from the Belgian and Russian Armed Forces under United Nations Confidence Restoration Operation in Croatia. They were joined by Jordanian and Pakistani mechanized battalions, Ukrainian helicopter gunships and other units. United States took a dominant role in implementation of reintegration process.

Strobe Talbott was one of the policy makers who raised the issue of regulation of position of Serbs in Croatia, the most important issue in Croatia–United States relations at the time, while US Ambassador Peter Galbraith organized three meetings with the population of the region in the towns of Vukovar, Beli Manastir and Ilok where he informed local Serbs that they will, regardless of fact that their leaders did not inform them of it, indeed become part of Croatia based on the Erdut Agreement. He also told them that they have the right to stay and live wherever they want in Croatia, be it Zagreb, Osijek, Donji Lapac, Knin or Glina and that ethnic Croats have the right to return to Eastern Slavonia. Madeleine Albright visited Vukovar in early 1996 to express her support to the process of reintegration where she was attacked with eggs and stones at local market. Initial headquarters was located at United Nations Protection Force headquarters in Zagreb but idea of mission personnel was to put headquarters in eastern Croatia. Croatian Government offered Osijek for that purpose but mission refused it since it wanted to locate it on the territory of Eastern Slavonia, Baranja and Western Syrmia. Therefore, the headquarters were located in Vukovar, with a liaison office in Beli Manastir, which provided UNTAES civil affairs officers with the opportunity to attend sessions of local Serb Executive Councils and assemblies which facilitated exchange of relevant information. One of the challenges the mission faced was the tense but mostly peaceful retake of Đeletovci oil fields from the control of Scorpions paramilitary. Representatives of mission urged ambassadors from Zagreb to visit the region and additionally introduced the practice of visiting of the local Serbian orthodox churches and two Catholic churches that still were in operation.

On 13th of April 1997 UNTAES facilitated the conduct of Croatian Chamber of Counties election in region and on that occasion special US mission under Nancy Ely-Raphael leadership visited Vukovar. US special mission visited Sarvaš, Erdut, Dalj, Vukovar, Borovo, Lovas, Opatovac, Ilok, Šarengrad, Bilje, Čeminac, Beli Manastir and Kneževi Vinogradi. US mission gave its thanks to Croatian authorities for enabling Serb population with missing Croatian documents to vote and to local Serbian executive committee presided by Vojislav Stanimirović for motivating local Serb population to take part in Croatian elections. Mission once more underlined that the goal of Erdut Agreement to re-establish multi-ethnic region in Croatian Podunavlje.

==== Local police reform ====
One of the main tasks of UNTAES was the reform of local police forces, which before the war were involved in the first inter-ethnic conflicts. UNTAES' initial problem was the need to replace the Federal Republic of Yugoslavia's symbols. Since there was resistance to that, a compromise was reached where UNTAES, with financial support of US Department of Justice, bought uniforms without any state insignia. The Croatian government initially refused to begin paying salaries to local police, but later agreed to do so since it demonstrated the return of Croatian sovereignty and responsibility for region. The second problem was that the Croatian government refused to pay salaries in Yugoslav dinars while the local police didn't want to receive Croatian kuna, so in the end it was paid in Deutsche Marks. The management of transitional police forces was functioning on the basis of dualism, in which each top position in the region there were two individuals, one from Croatian and one from the Serbian community, including double commanders of police forces. Support for UNTAES was provided by the Polish Special Police Group that made first arrest of an indicated war criminal who was a former mayor of Vukovar.

==== Administration's extensions ====
- in July 1996 with the United Nations Security Council Resolution 1069
- in November 1996 with the United Nations Security Council Resolution 1079
- in July 1997 with the United Nations Security Council Resolution 1120

=== Subsequent events ===
The United Nations Security Council Resolution 1145 in late 1997 arranged for the United Nations Police Support Group (UNPSG) to take over UNTAES' policing tasks, effectively concluding the UNTAES mission on January 15, 1998. A support group of 180 civilian UN police officers remained to monitor the progress of the Croatian police and oversee the return of the refugees. As additional help to UNTAES mission, Organization for Security and Cooperation in Europe established OSCE Mission to Croatia whose tasks was to overlook of respect of human and minority rights, return of refugees, formation of public institutions and monitoring of work of civil police.

Introduced in 2019 and officially marked since 2020, 15 January is observed in Croatia as the Day of Peaceful Reintegration of the Croatian Danube Region, designated as a working memorial day. It coincides with the Day of International Recognition of the Republic of Croatia.

Since the onset of the Russian invasion of Ukraine, Croatia has increasingly referenced its experience with the UNTAES as a case study in peaceful conflict resolution and post-conflict reintegration positioning itself as a potential mediator.

== See also ==
- List of territories governed by the United Nations
- United Nations Civilian Police Support Group
- Joint Council of Municipalities
- 1997 Eastern Slavonia integrity referendum

== Sources ==
- Bing, Albert (April 2016). "Sjedinjene Američke Države i reintegracija hrvatskog Podunavlja" [The United States of America and the reintegration of the Croatian Danube Region] (PDF). Scrinia Slavonica (in Croatian). 8 (1). Croatian Institute of History: 336–365.
- Boothby, Derek (January–March 2004). "The Political Challenges of Administering Eastern Slavonia". Global Governance. 10 (1). Global Governance: A Review of Multilateralism and International Organizations: 37–51 (15 pages). doi:10.1163/19426720-01001005. JSTOR 27800508.
- Dover, Edwin D. (1998). The Presidential Election of 1996: Clinton's Incumbency and Television. Westport, Connecticut & London: Praeger Publishers. ISBN 0-275-96259-8.
- Erceg, Tena (2015). Iznevjereni ugovori — Međunarodne misije u Republici Hrvatskoj [Betrayed Agreements — International Missions in the Republic of Croatia] (in Serbian). Zagreb, Croatia: Serb National Council. ISBN 978-953-7442-24-8.
- Hayball, Harry Jack (April 2015). Serbia and the Serbian Rebellion in Croatia (1990-1991) (PDF) (Doctor of Philosophy). Goldsmiths College.
- Kovačević, Slobodanka (1998). Chronology of the Yugoslav crisis, Volume 4. Institute for European Studies. ISBN 978-86-82057-19-2.
- Morić, Joško (April 2016). "(Ne)željena reintegracija" (PDF). Političke analize (Political Analysis). 7 (25). Faculty of Political Science, University of Zagreb: 14–17.
- Ramsbotham, Oliver; Woodhouse, Tom (1999). Encyclopedia of International Peacekeeping Operations. Santa Barbara, California: ABC-CLIO. ISBN 0874368928.
- Savković, Mirko (December 13, 2024). "Potencijali i ograničenja iskustava UNTAES-a u kontekstu projekcije hrvatske meke moći pri rješavanju međunarodnih sukoba" [Potentials and Limitations of the UNTAES Experience in Projection of Croatian Soft Power in International Conflict Resolution Efforts]. Tragovi: Journal for Serbian and Croatian Topics (in Croatian). 7 (2): 143–169.
- Zwadiuk, Oleh (April 9, 1997). "Croatia: U.S. Urges Participation In Elections". Radio Free Europe/Radio Liberty. Archived from the original on January 22, 2021.
- Živić, D. (2003). "Prognano stanovništvo iz hrvatskog Podunavlja i problemi njegovog povratka (1991. – 2001.)". Croatian Geographical Bulletin (in Croatian). 65 (1): 63–81. doi:10.21861/HGG.2003.65.01.04.
