= United Nations Security Council Resolution 1043 =

UN Security Council Resolution 1043
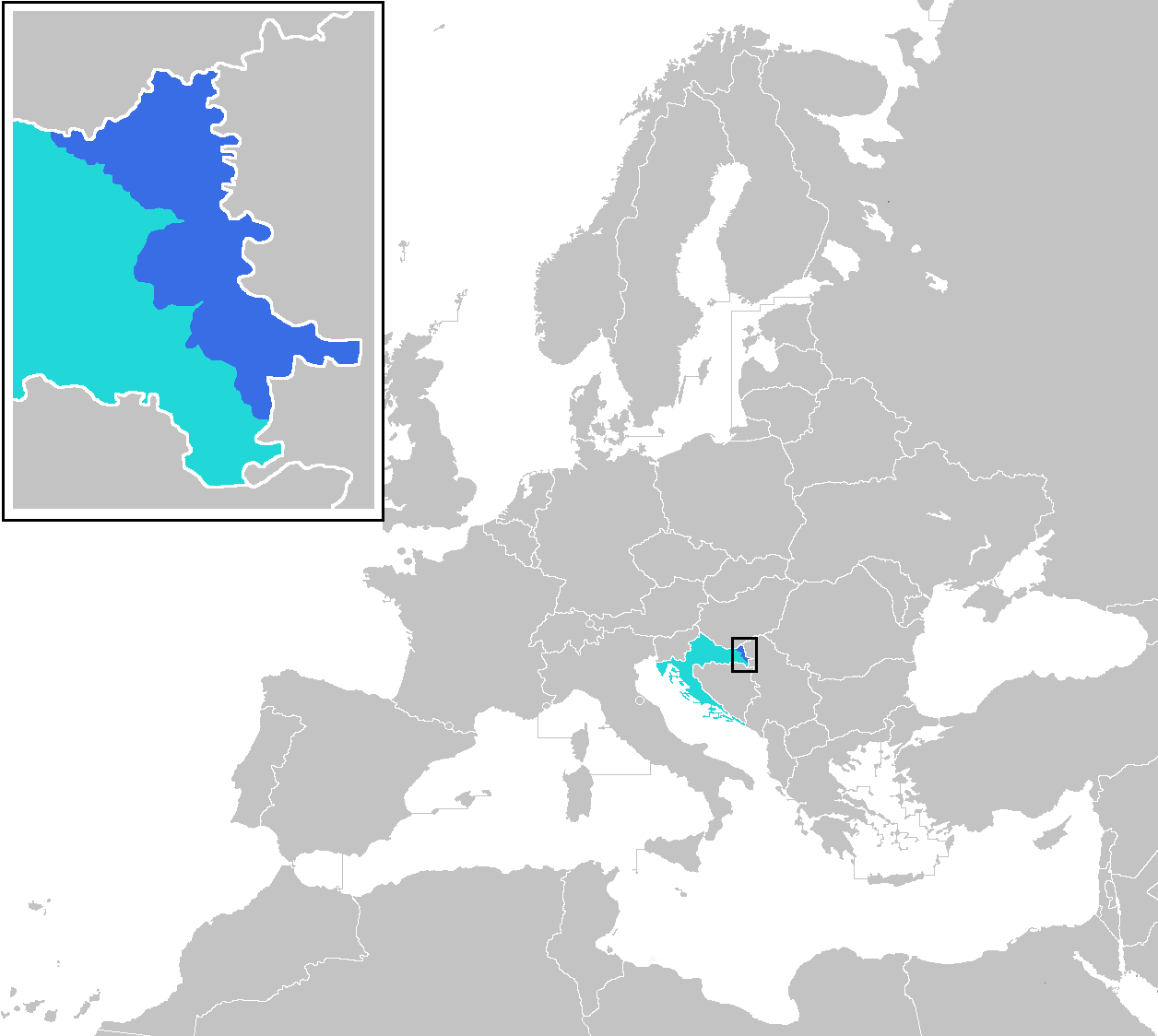
- Eastern Slavonia, Baranja and Western Syrmia governed by the UNTAES administration
- Date: 31 January 1996
- Meeting no.: 3,626
- Code: S/RES/1043 (Document)
- Subject: The situation in Croatia
- Voting summary: 15 voted for; None voted against; None abstained
- Result: Adopted

Security Council composition
- Permanent members: China; France; Russia; United Kingdom; United States
- Non-permanent members: Botswana; Chile; Egypt; Guinea-Bissau; Germany; Honduras; Indonesia; Italy; South Korea; Poland

United Nations Security Council resolution 1043, adopted unanimously on 31 January 1996, after recalling previous resolutions on Croatia including Resolution 1037 (1996) which established the United Nations Transitional Authority for Eastern Slavonia, Baranja and Western Sirmium (UNTAES), the Council authorised the deployment of 100 military observers for an initial period of six months. On 26 January the Secretary General informed the Security Council that the UNTAES mission will need the observers to supervise demilitarization of Eastern Slavonia.

== See also ==
- Bosnian War
- Breakup of Yugoslavia
- Croatian War of Independence
- List of United Nations Security Council Resolutions 1001 to 1100 (1995–1997)
- Yugoslav Wars
- United Nations Transitional Authority for Eastern Slavonia, Baranja and Western Sirmium
- Eastern Slavonia, Baranja and Western Syrmia
- Joint Council of Municipalities
- List of United Nations Security Council Resolutions related to the conflicts in former Yugoslavia
