= United Nations Security Council Resolution 1025 =

UN Security Council Resolution 1025
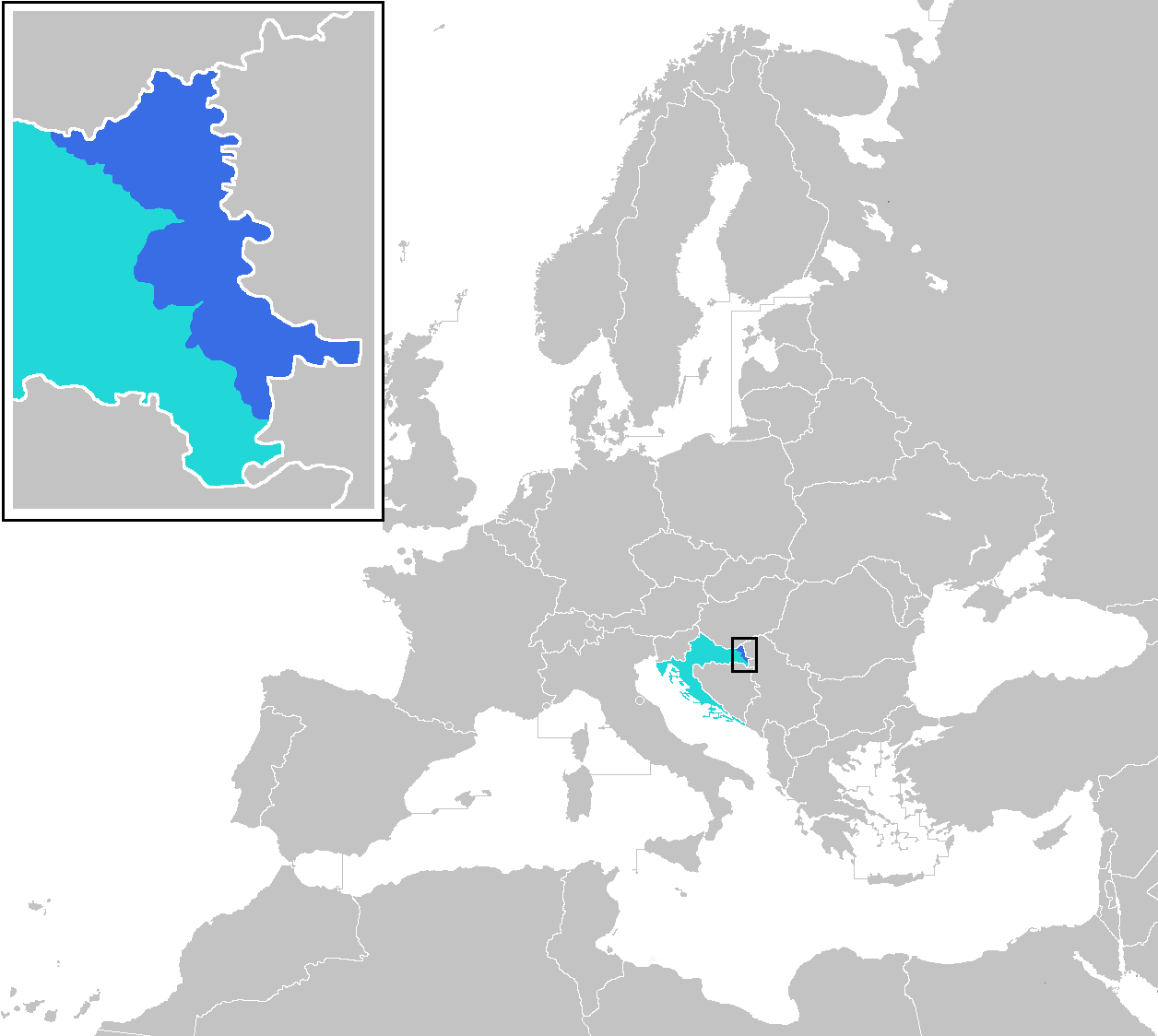
- Eastern Slavonia, Baranja and Western Syrmia governed by the UNTAES administration
- Date: 30 November 1995
- Meeting no.: 3,600
- Code: S/RES/1025 (Document)
- Subject: Croatia
- Voting summary: 15 voted for; None voted against; None abstained
- Result: Adopted

Security Council composition
- Permanent members: China; France; Russia; United Kingdom; United States
- Non-permanent members: Argentina; Botswana; Czech Republic; Germany; Honduras; Indonesia; Italy; Nigeria; Oman; Rwanda

United Nations Security Council resolution 1025, adopted unanimously on 30 November 1995, after recalling resolutions 981 (1995) and 1023 (1995) on Croatia, the Council decided that the mandate of the United Nations Confidence Restoration Operation (UNCRO) would terminate after an interim period ending 15 January 1996.

The Council once again reaffirmed that Eastern Slavonia, Baranja and Western Syrmia (known as Sector East) were integral parts of Croatia and the importance it attached for respect of human rights and fundamental freedoms.

Acting under Chapter VII of the United Nations Charter, the Secretary-General Boutros Boutros-Ghali was requested to report to the council by 14 December 1995 on proposals for a transitional authority and peacekeeping force in the aforementioned regions to implement the Basic Agreement. It was also decided that, in order for the transitional authority to be established, UNCRO's mandate would end on 15 January 1996 or when the Security Council decided on the deployment of the authority and peacekeeping force.

== See also ==
- Bosnian War
- Breakup of Yugoslavia
- Croatian War of Independence
- SAO Eastern Slavonia, Baranja and Western Syrmia
- List of United Nations Security Council Resolutions 1001 to 1100 (1995–1997)
- Yugoslav Wars
- United Nations Transitional Authority for Eastern Slavonia, Baranja and Western Sirmium
- Joint Council of Municipalities
- List of United Nations Security Council Resolutions related to the conflicts in former Yugoslavia
