= Erdut Agreement =

1995 treaty ending the Croatian War of Independence

Basic Agreement on the Region of Eastern Slavonia, Baranja and Western Sirmium
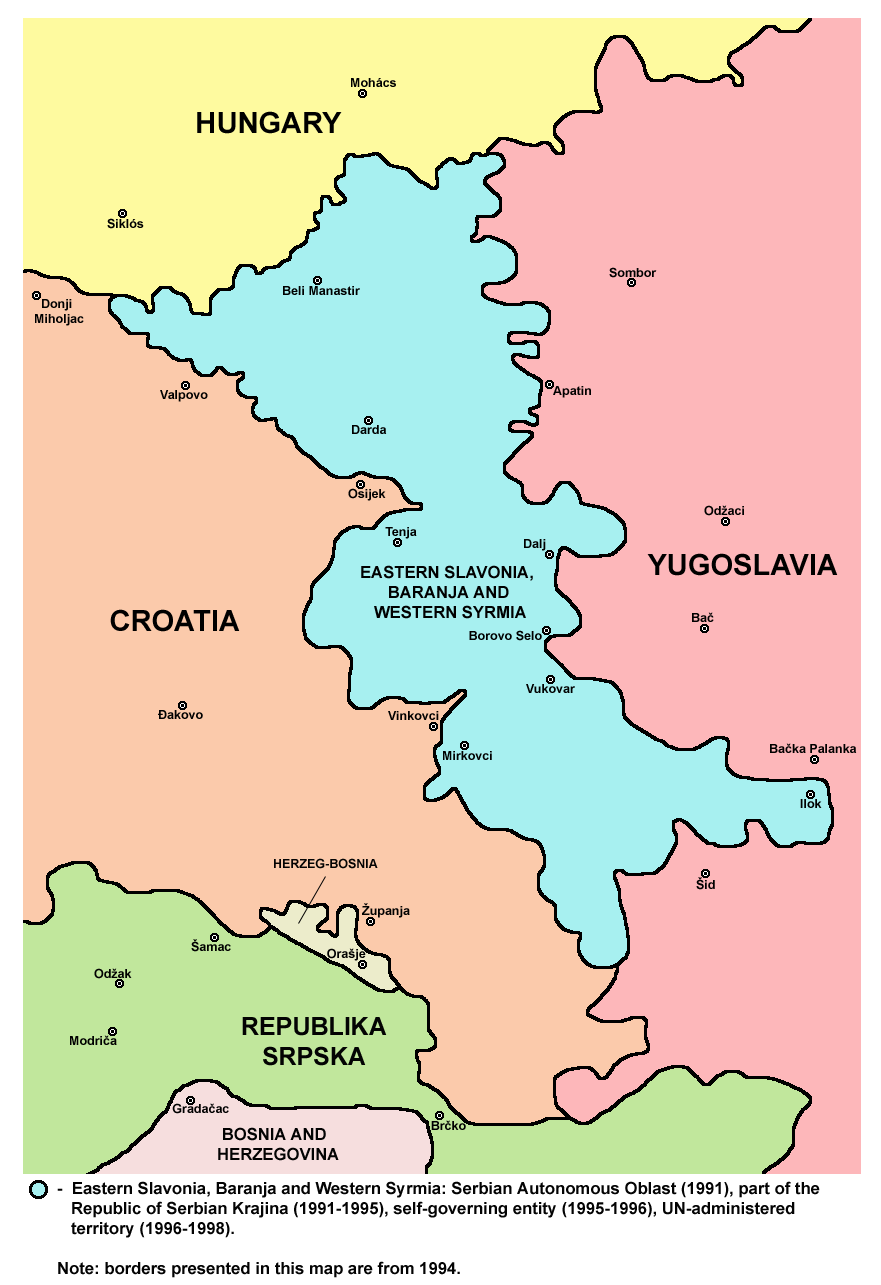
- Map of Eastern Slavonia, Baranja and Western Syrmia
- Type: Peace agreement
- Signed: 12 November 1995
- Location: Erdut, Croatia
- Signatories: (Croatia) Hrvoje Šarinić; Milan Milanović
- Parties: Croatia; Eastern Slavonia, Baranja and Western Syrmia Witnessed by: United Nations; United States

Full text
- Erdut Agreement at Wikisource

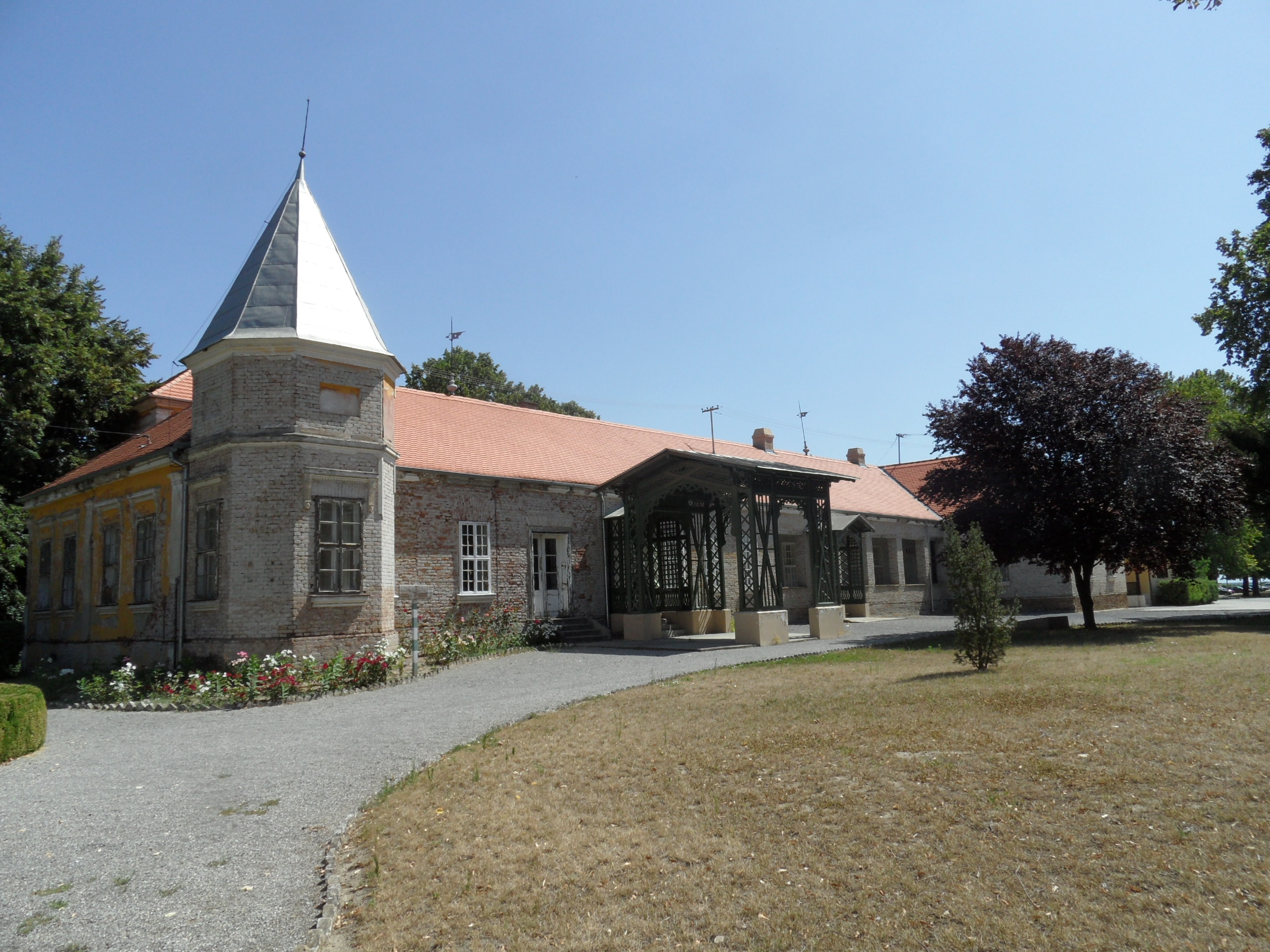
Castle of Adamovich-Cseh, where the Erdut Agreement was signed.

The Erdut Agreement (Serbo-Croatian: Erdutski sporazum / Ердутски споразум), officially the Basic Agreement on the Region of Eastern Slavonia, Baranja and Western Sirmium, is an agreement reached on 12 November 1995 between the authorities of the Republic of Croatia and the local Serb authorities of the Eastern Slavonia, Baranja and Western Syrmia region on the peaceful resolution to the Croatian War of Independence in eastern Croatia. It effectively ended the ethno-nationalist conflict in the region and initiated the process of peaceful reintegration of the region to central government control of Croatia. The reintegration was directly implemented by the United Nations. The agreement provided a set of guarantees on human and minority rights as well as on the refugee return. It was named after Erdut, the village in which it was signed by local Serb representatives.

The signers were Hrvoje Šarinić, the former prime minister of Croatia, and Milan Milanović, a local Serb politician representing the self-proclaimed Republic of Serbian Krajina (RSK) under instructions from the authorities of the Federal Republic of Yugoslavia. The witnesses were Peter Galbraith, the ambassador of the United States to Croatia at the time, and Thorvald Stoltenberg, the United Nations intermediary.

The territory of Eastern Slavonia, Baranja and Western Sirmium had previously been controlled by the RSK, and before that by the SAO Eastern Slavonia, Baranja and Western Syrmia. The agreement was acknowledged by the United Nations Security Council Resolution 1023, and it paved the way to the establishment of the United Nations Transitional Authority for Eastern Slavonia, Baranja and Western Sirmium. Contrary to most of the other missions, UNTAES was modelled as the supreme governing authority in the region creating one of only a couple of United Nations protectorates in the organization's history. While ensuring full reintegration of the region without territorial autonomy clauses, the agreement served as a cornerstone for the establishment of contemporary Serb minority institutions not only in the region but the rest of Croatia as well. It explicitly provided the basis for the establishment of the regional Serb institution of the Joint Council of Municipalities.

== Background ==
In 1995 mini Contact Group of foreign ambassadors in Zagreb drafted a comprehensive proposal to Croatian President Franjo Tuđman and the leaders of the Republic of Serbian Krajina in Knin aimed at peaceful resolution of the Croatian War of Independence. The proposal was known as the Z-4 Plan and it proposed reintegration of Krajina to Croatian constitutional framework on the basis of a new Constitutional Agreement which defined Krajina as an autonomous region of Croatia. The plan did not envisage special autonomy for Eastern Slavonia but rather two years long transitional period. Krajina leaders in Knin refused to receive the draft proposal which subsequently led to Operation Flash and Operation Storm and complete military defeat of Krajina resulting in over 200,000 Croatian Serb refugees who left their homes.

Rump and geographically separated territory of Eastern Slavonia, Baranja and Western Syrmia (commonly known as Eastern Slavonia) remained the only part of Croatia under Serb control. Contrary to Krajina, Eastern Slavonia shared a long border with the Republic of Serbia. It was also economically and socially dependent and politically much more closely aligned with authorities in Belgrade and Novi Sad than Krajina. This led the international community to believe that Croatian intervention in Eastern Slavonia would trigger a military reaction from Yugoslavia and result in an escalation of hostilities. At the same time, the military defeat at Krajina and signing of the Washington Agreement opened the space to resolve the armed conflict in Bosnia which the US Administration wanted to use as political ammunition before the 1996 United States presidential election. Croatia conditioned its participation at the Dayton Peace Conference on the resolution of conflict in Eastern Slavonia, while international community insisted on avoidance of any new major escalation of Yugoslav crisis. This created conditions in which peaceful resolution was preferred or acceptable to all parties concerned.

=== Agreement history ===
As a part of his Bosnia peace efforts United States President Bill Clinton also stated:

"There must be a long-term plan for resolving the situation in Eastern Slavonia ... based on Croatian sovereignty and the principles of the Z-4 Plan (e.g. Serb home rule, the right of refugees to return, and the other guarantees for Serbs who live there)."

Despite territorial autonomy's prominent place in President Clinton's plans and effort by the US ambassador Peter Galbraith to model this autonomy proposal on recently suspended precedent of the Autonomous District of Glina and Knin from the Constitutional Act on National and Ethnic Communities or Minorities, this proposal was rejected by Serbian authorities in Krajna and by the Croatian Government, which preferred military solution over territorial autonomy. This convinced international community to focus on the models of non-territorial national personal autonomy, minority rights and inter-municipal cooperation. The refusal to include any territorial autonomy provisions strengthened demands for human rights provisions.

== Provisions ==
=== Return of refugees ===
United Nations Transitional Administration was requested to ensure the possibility for the return of refugees and displaced persons to their homes of origin. The same rights were to be enjoyed both to those who have left the region or those who have come to the region from other parts of Croatia.

=== Inter-communal power sharing ===
Joint Implementation Committees formed both by local Croat and Serb communities assisted the UNTAES in governing the region. Local police forces were organized to have equal number of ethnic Croats and ethnic Serbs plus additional smaller numbers of personnel from all the other communities in the region.

=== Minority rights provisions ===
The agreement itself and subsequent developments and commitments during the UNTAES mandate represent the basis on which numerous minority institutions operate today. Establishment of the Joint Council of Municipalities, with a Serbian majority population was one of explicit rights granted to the Serb community. Other institutions such as Serb National Council and weekly magazine Novosti were established at the same time, while some, such as Radio Borovo, were registered in accordance with Croatian laws. Agreement requires respect of the highest levels of internationally recognized human rights and fundamental freedoms.

== International impact ==
In February 2020, the Erdut Agreement was quoted as a precedent for and a comparable case by Ukrainian diplomats for implementation of the Minsk II measures agreed upon in the Minsk Protocol intended to halt the War in Donbas.

== See also ==
- Josip Reihl-Kir (25 July 1955 – 1 July 1991; assassinated police chief from Osijek during SFR Yugoslavia known for his peacemaking initiatives)
- Dayton Agreement (Erdut Agreement was major precondition for the 1995 conference)
- Croatia–Serbia border dispute
- Croatia–Serbia genocide case
- 1997 Eastern Slavonia integrity referendum

== Sources ==
- Albert Bing (October 2008). "Sjedinjene Američke Države i reintegracija hrvatskog Podunavlja" [The United States of America and the reintegration of the Croatian Danube Region]. Scrinia Slavonica (in Croatian). 8 (1). Slavonski Brod: Croatian Institute of History.
