= United Nations Security Council Resolution 1023 =

UN Security Council Resolution 1023
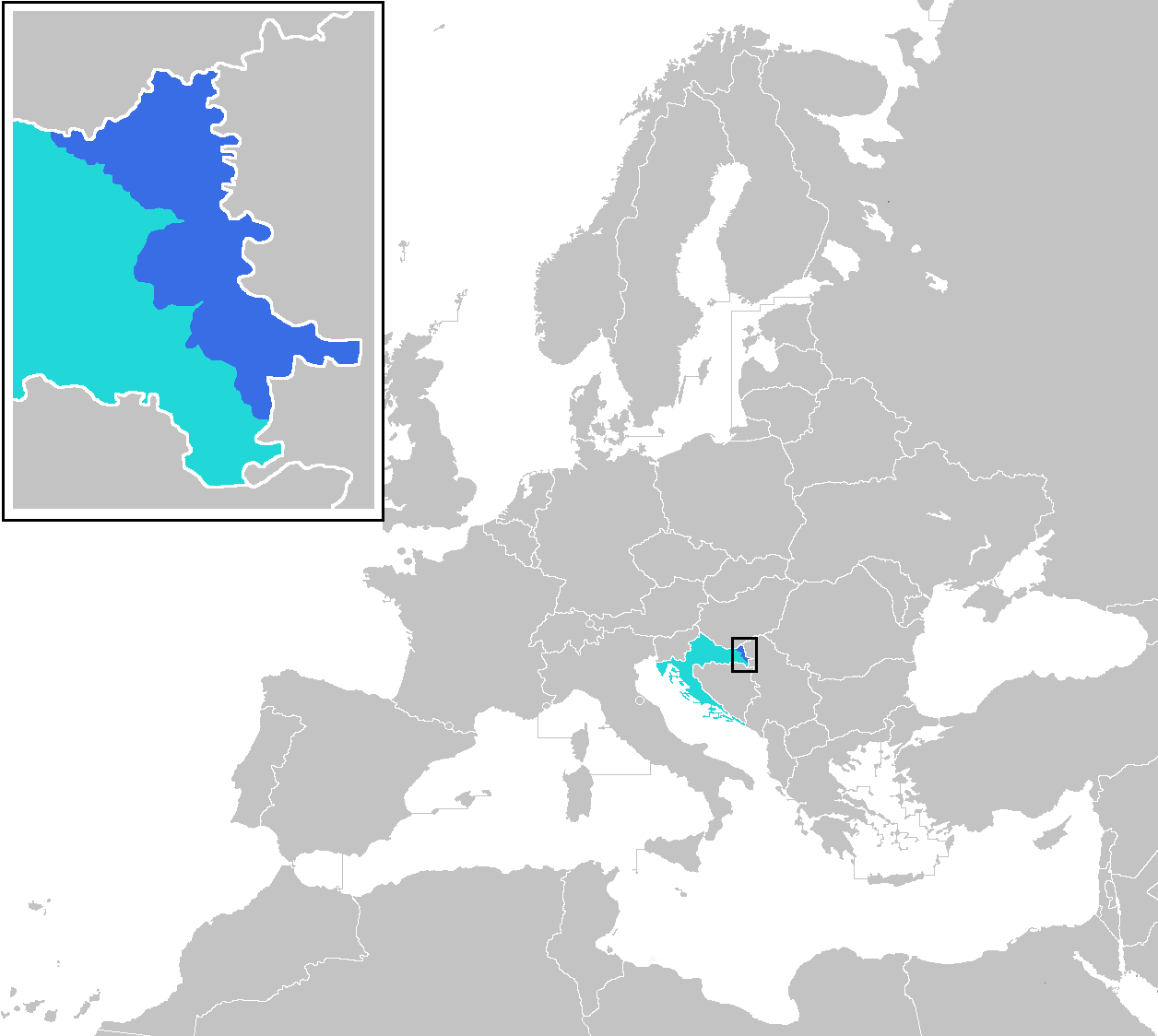
- Eastern Slavonia, Baranja and Western Syrmia governed by the UNTAES administration
- Date: 22 November 1995
- Meeting no.: 3,596
- Code: S/RES/1023 (Document)
- Subject: Croatia
- Voting summary: 15 voted for; None voted against; None abstained
- Result: Adopted

Security Council composition
- Permanent members: China; France; Russia; United Kingdom; United States
- Non-permanent members: Argentina; Botswana; Czech Republic; Germany; Honduras; Indonesia; Italy; Nigeria; Oman; Rwanda

United Nations Security Council resolution 1023, adopted unanimously on 22 November 1995, after recalling all resolutions on the conflicts in the former Yugoslavia, the Council noted the "Basic Agreement on the Region of Eastern Slavonia, Baranja and Western Sirmium" between the Government of Croatia and local Serb representatives.

The Security Council again stressed the need for a negotiated political solution to the conflicts in the former Yugoslavia, including the mutual recognition of states in the territory. It also noted that Eastern Slavonia, Baranja and Western Sirmium (known as Sector East) are integral parts of Croatia. Importance was attached to respect for human rights and fundamental freedoms in those areas.

The "Basic Agreement on the Region of Eastern Slavonia, Baranja and Western Sirmium" agreement signed on 12 November 1995 was welcomed and the request to establish a transitional authority and international force contained in the agreement was recognised. All parties were urged to co-operate with each other and the United Nations Confidence Restoration Operation.

== See also ==
- Bosnian War
- Breakup of Yugoslavia
- Croatian War of Independence
- SAO Eastern Slavonia, Baranja and Western Syrmia
- List of United Nations Security Council Resolutions 1001 to 1100 (1995–1997)
- Yugoslav Wars
- United Nations Transitional Authority for Eastern Slavonia, Baranja and Western Sirmium
- Joint Council of Municipalities
- List of United Nations Security Council Resolutions related to the conflicts in former Yugoslavia
