= Eastern Slavonia, Baranja and Western Syrmia (1995–1998) =

Short-lived Serb parallel entity in the territory of Croatia

Eastern Slavonia, Baranja and Western Syrmia Источна Славонија, Барања и Западни Срем, Istočna Slavonija, Baranja i Zapadni Srem (Serbian) Istočna Slavonija, Baranja i Zapadni Srijem (Croatian)
- 1995–1998 (UN governed territory 1996–1998)
1995–1997 (new flag)
1996–1998
Flag

Coat of arms
- Anthem: Боже правде Bože pravde (English: "God of Justice")
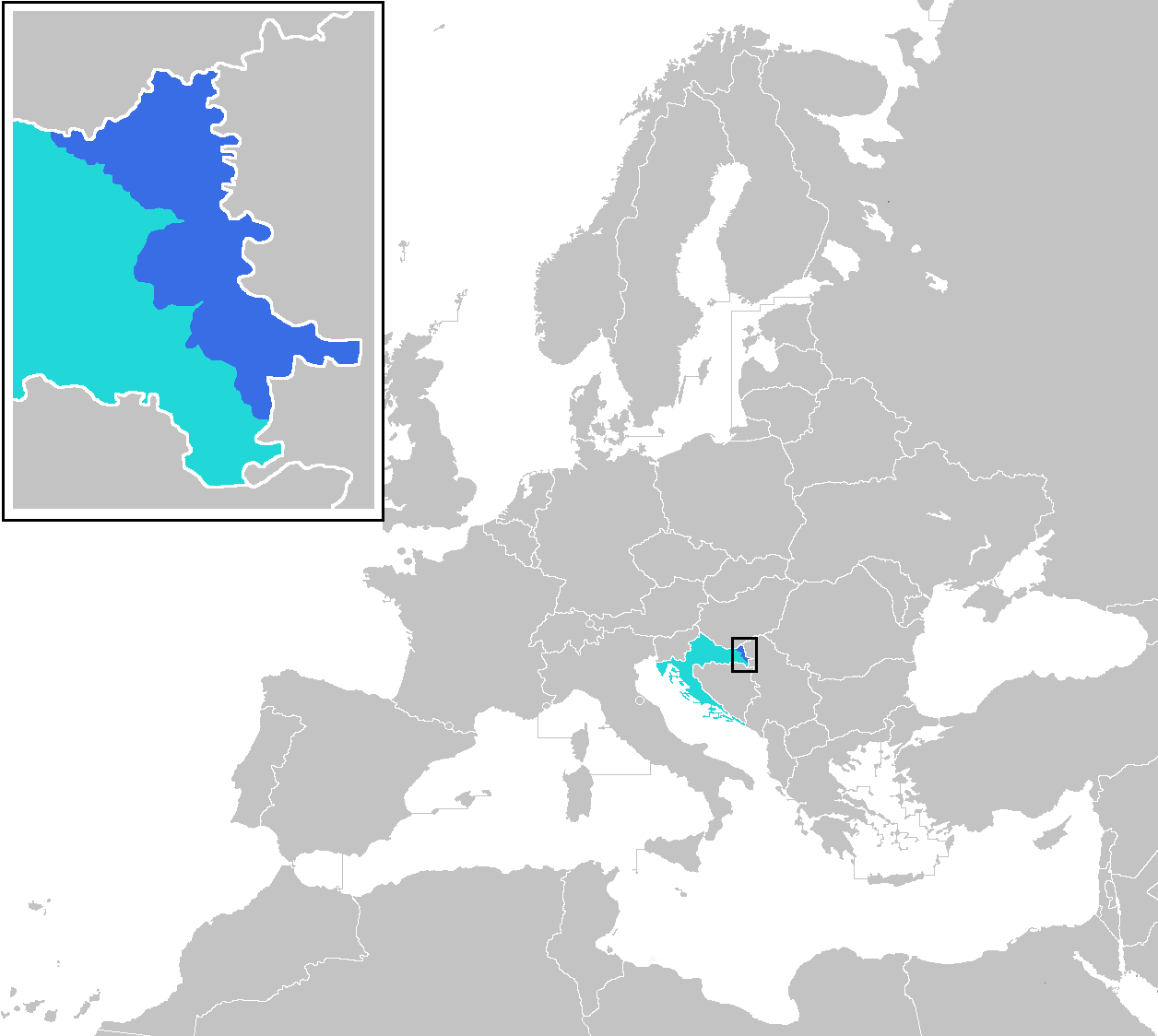

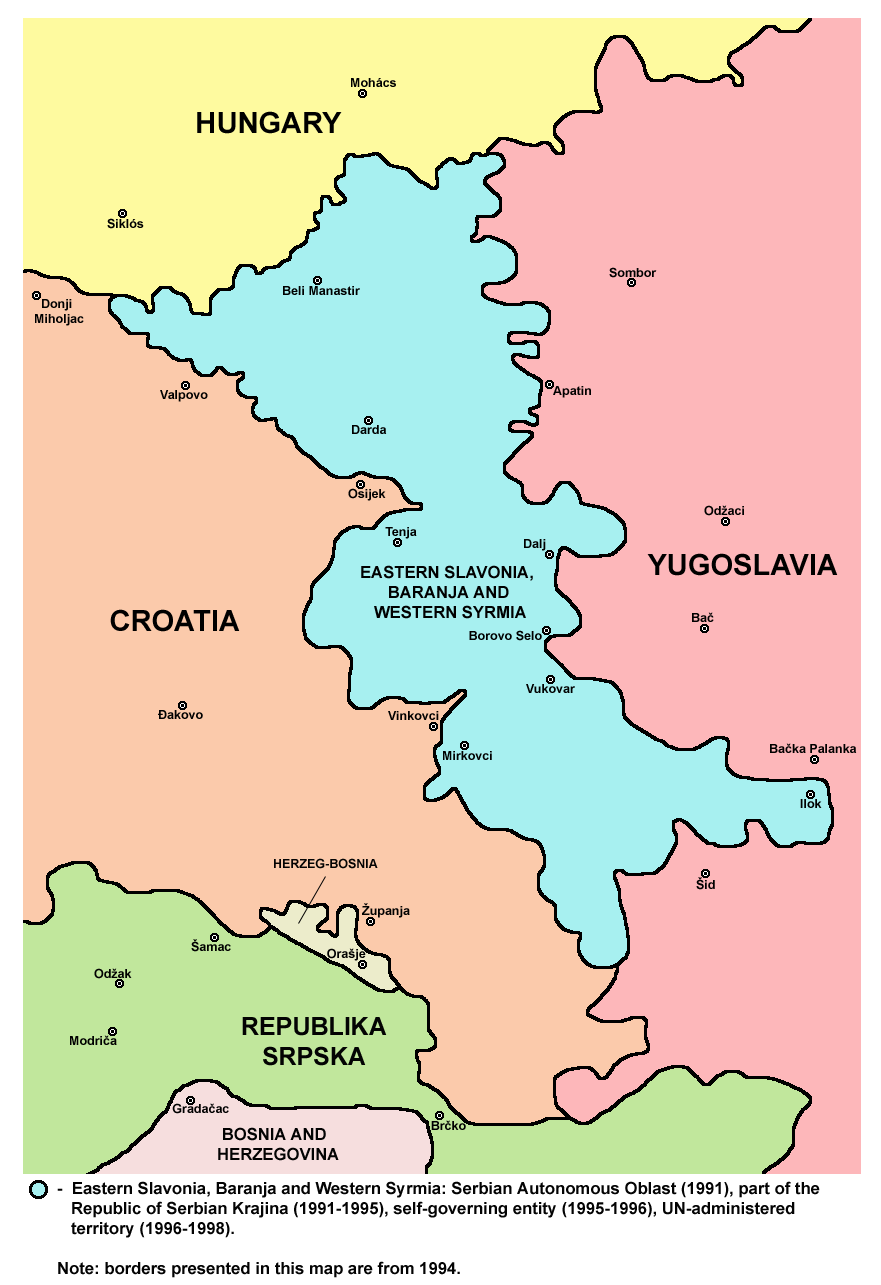
- Status: Self-proclaimed entity / United Nations governed territory
- Capital: Vukovar
- Government: Republic
- Chairman of the Executive Council
  - 1995–1996: Borislav Držajić
  - 1996–1997: Vojislav Stanimirović
- President
  - 1995–1996: Slavko Dokmanović
  - 1996–1998: Goran Hadžić
- Historical era: Breakup of Yugoslavia
  - Collapse of the RSK: August 1995
  - Erdut Agreement: 12 November 1995
  - UNTAES administration: 15 January 1996
  - 1997 integrity referendum: 6 April 1997
  - Reintegration into Croatia completed: 15 January 1998

Area
  - Total: 2,600 km^{2} (1,000 sq mi)

Population
  - 1991 estimate: 193,513
- Currency: Yugoslav dinar de facto Deutsche Mark de facto Croatian kuna
Preceded by	Succeeded by
Republic of Serbian Krajina	UNTAES; Croatia

Eastern Slavonia, Baranja and Western Syrmia, (Note: Serbian: Источна Славонија, Барања и Западни Срем, romanized: Istočna Slavonija, Baranja i Zapadni Srem; Croatian: Istočna Slavonija, Baranja i Zapadni Srijem) commonly abbreviated as Eastern Slavonia, (Note: Serbian: Источна Славонија, romanized: Istočna Slavonija; Croatian: Istočna Slavonija) was a short-lived Serb parallel entity in the territory of Croatia along the Danube river.

The entity encompassed the same territory as the SAO Eastern Slavonia, Baranja and Western Syrmia, which was formed in 1991, and was an exclave that had been merged into the self-proclaimed Republic of Serbian Krajina. When the latter entity was defeated at the end of the Croatian War of Independence in 1995, the territory of Eastern Slavonia remained in place for another three years in which it experienced significant changes ultimately leading to peaceful reintegration via the United Nations Transitional Administration for Eastern Slavonia, Baranja and Western Sirmium (UNTAES).

In the period between August 1995 and January 1996, the region functioned as a rump territory of the Republic of Serbian Krajina. The period was marked by increased insecurity and expectation of the Croatian military offensive. A diplomatic solution that avoided the conflict in Eastern Slavonia was reached on 12 November 1995 via the signing of the Erdut Agreement with significant support and facilitation from the international community (primarily the United States, the United Nations, and various European actors).

As the result of the fact that the UNTAES became the effective government of the region, from January 1996 onwards local parallel institutions of the Eastern Slavonia, Baranja and Western Syrmia started functioning primarily as the consociational representative institutions of the Serb community in the region. As such, they were acknowledged and involved in elaborate power-sharing initiatives by the UNTAES, yet they were gradually abolished as the local Serb community got exponentially more integrated and involved in power-sharing in regular mainstream institutions of the Croatian state/society. At the same time, Croat and other refugees from the region and Croatian institutions gradually returned to the region. Croatian state officials were welcomed to the region by the UNTAES administration including at the time of the first visit by the President of Croatia Franjo Tuđman in late 1996 when the head of the UNTAES Jacques Paul Klein organized a meeting between Croat and Serb delegation at the UNTAES headquarters in Vukovar.

With the abolition of the parallel Serb bodies of the Eastern Slavonia, Baranja and Western Syrmia, the local Serb community began to exercise its right to establish regular institutions and bodies of cultural self-government. The main one of them was the Joint Council of Municipalities, an elected consultative sui generis inter-municipal body created to advocate for the interests of the Serb community in the region. This process was consequential for the rest of Croatia as well as it enabled the creation of other statewide bodies such as the Serb National Council. International community remained present in the region primarily in observers capacity via the United Nations Civilian Police Support Group (16 January 1998–15 October 1998) and OSCE Mission to Croatia (1996–2007).

== History ==
=== Origins ===
Eastern Slavonia, Baranja, and Western Syrmia was formed out of the only part of the rebel Republic of Serbian Krajina that was not overrun by Croatian government forces in August 1995. After Operation Storm in August 1995, by which the majority of the Republic of Serbian Krajina was restored to Croatian control, Eastern Slavonia, Baranja and Western Syrmia became a de facto self-governing territory. Immediately upon completion of Operation Storm, U.S. President Bill Clinton, within the framework of an initiative to end the war in Bosnia, said that:

"There must be a long-term plan for a sustainable solution to the situation in Eastern Slavonia ... based on Croatian sovereignty and the principles outlined in the Z-4 plan."

— Bill Clinton

Croatia in this period hesitated between a diplomatic or military solution, but due to strong pressure from the international community, the possibility of military intervention was rejected. In November 1995, local Serb leaders signed the Erdut Agreement, by which the eventual re-integration of this region into Croatia was agreed-upon. The Erdut agreement was reached as part of negotiations at the Dayton Agreement conference. Nevertheless, the Croatian negotiating team rejected the Z-4 plan proposed by Bill Clinton as a basis for negotiations.

=== Erdut Agreement and establishment of UNTAES ===
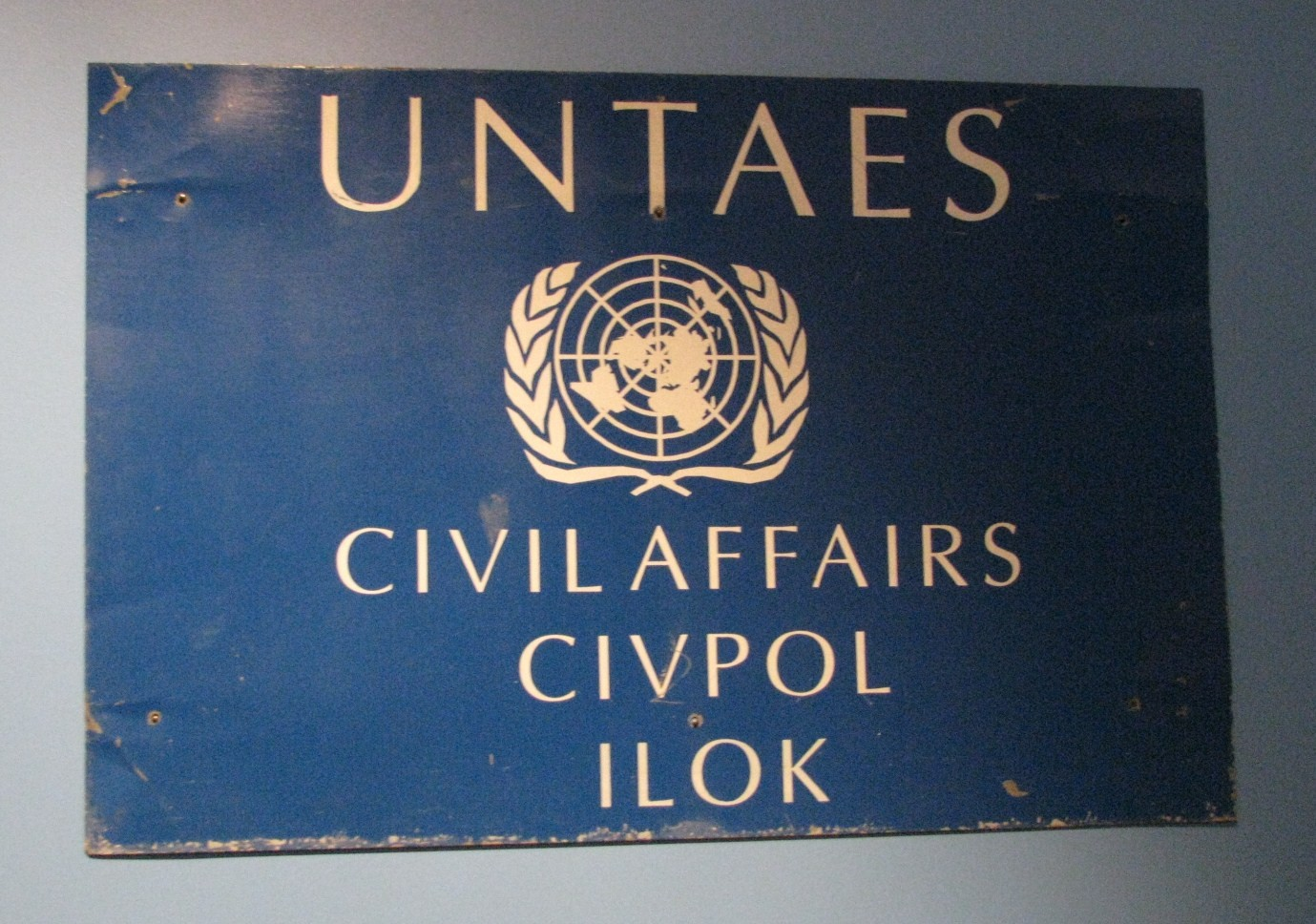
UNTAES table in Ilok

By the Erdut Agreement, Eastern Slavonia, Baranja and Western Syrmia was replaced by the United Nations Transitional Administration for Eastern Slavonia, Baranja and Western Sirmium on 15 January 1996. The goal of the UNTAES mission was the creation of a transitional period during which the UNTAES peacekeepers would oversee a peaceful reintegration of the territory into Croatia. During the 1995–1998 period, the territory was called "Danube Krajina" (Podunavska Krajina) by Serbs, and "Croatian Danube" or "Croatian Podunavlje" (Hrvatsko Podunavlje) by Croats. The name often used for it between 1995 and 1998 was Syrmia-Baranja Oblast. Sometimes, the shortened name Eastern Slavonia was also used as a designation for this region.

Within the framework of reintegration in 1996 and under pressure from the international community, an abolition decision was passed for those who participated in rebellion. One of the main tasks for the new United Nations mission was to create conditions for the return of Croats who were expelled during the war in this region. They also sought to avoid a new wave of emigration of the ethnic Serb community to Serbia that was seen after Operation Storm.

In 1996, all the towns and municipalities in the region were designated Areas of Special State Concern by the Croatian government. In 1998, the UNTAES mission was completed and the territory was formally integrated into Croatia.

=== Local authorities until the end of reintegration ===
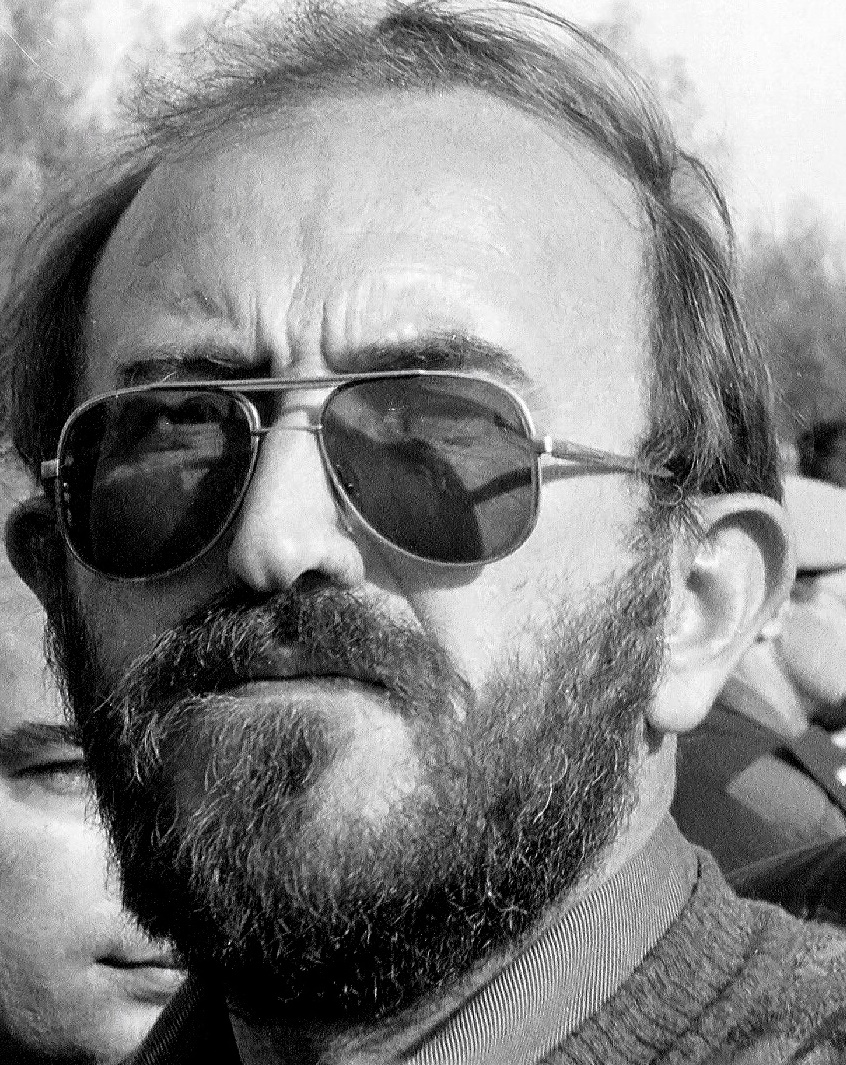
Goran Hadžić, the second president of Eastern Slavonia

After Operation Flash, representatives of Republika Srpska and Republic of Serbian Krajina announced that they would implement unification of these two entities. In response to this, local Serb leaders in Eastern Slavonia, Baranja and Western Syrmia founded a body called the Coordinating Committee that opposed unification, arguing that it would just deepen the crisis and damage Belgrade's intentions to achieve peace in Bosnia. Authorities of the RSK in Knin declared the goal of the Coordinating Committee to be the secession of Eastern Slavonia, Baranja and Western Syrmia from Republic of Serbian Krajina, claiming that there is now no power in Knin, but instead in Belgrade. This statement became a reality once Operation Storm was completed because western parts of Republic of Serbian Krajina no longer existed. During the Croatian military actions Flash and Storm on western parts of Krajina, the army in Eastern Slavonia did not act against the Croatian Army. However, local Serbs representatives strongly condemned the actions of the Croatian Army. After these events, and institution was established that was called the National Council Syrmia-Baranja Oblast and the region's name was changed to Syrmia-Baranja Oblast. Since the region was keen to maintain continuity with the Republic of Serbian Krajina for future negotiations, the region also established the National Council of Republic of Serbian Krajina of Syrmia-Baranja Oblast. In 1996 in Ilok, there was a proposal to abolish the District Assembly because there were no conditions for its work, but this proposal was rejected. The District Assembly was a body with 50 members elected in elections. In 1997 in Vukovar, the Independent Democratic Serb Party was established. That same year, the Joint Council of Municipalities was founded, and by the end of reintegration, all the other entities were abolished and replaced by Croatian institutions.

=== Local Serb population and Serbs from other parts of Croatia ===
The local Serb population did not regard the plans to reunite the region with Croatia with approval. At the end of June 1996, NGOs in the region organized a petition that asked that the region remain a special area with independent executive, legislative and judiciary. The petition was signed by 50,000 residents of Eastern Slavonia, Baranja and Western Syrmia. The petition was then sent to the United Nations. In 1997 in Vukovar, protests were organized in which the local population called for the establishment of autonomous Serbian institutions after the completion of reintegration. The protests gathered between 5,000 and 12,000 participants. At the protests, protesters expressed opposition to the partition of the region in two Croatian counties (Vukovar-Syrmia County and Osijek-Baranja). That question was posed in the 1997 Eastern Slavonia integrity referendum in which, according to the Electoral Commission, the voter turnout was 77.40%. Reportedly 99.01% or 99.5% of voters voted for the integrity of the region within Croatia. Nonetheless, it did not prevent the decision and the region was divided. Representatives of United Nations missions in the region said that the referendum was irrelevant because such an option was never considered.

=== Croats from the region ===
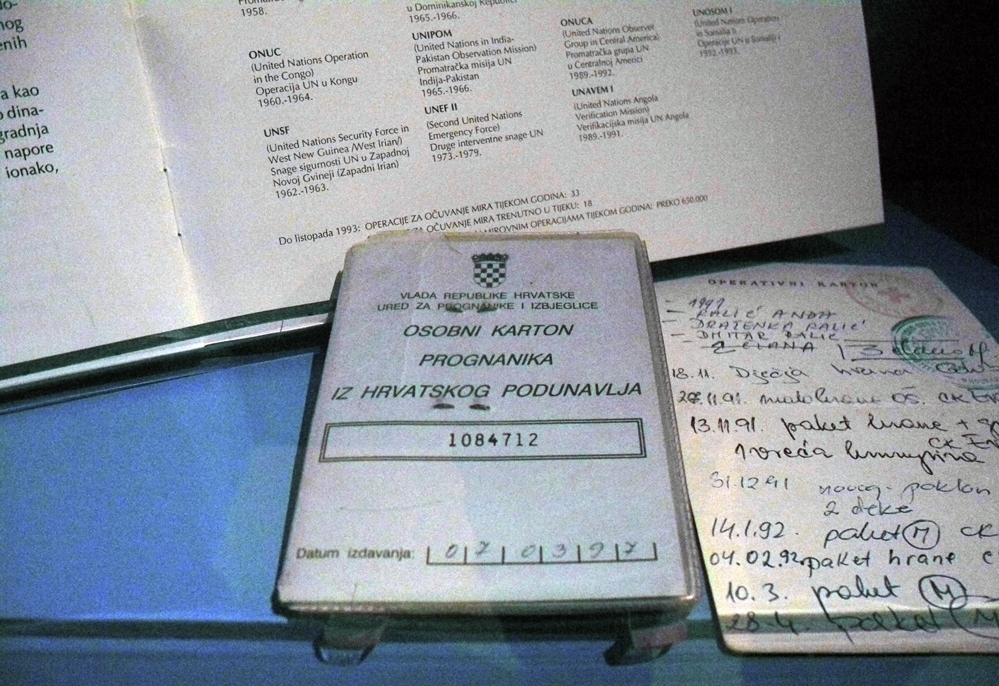
Identity documents of Croatian refugee from region

The majority of ethnic Croats from Eastern Slavonia, Baranja and Western Syrmia were expelled from the region in conflicts in the early nineties. The persecution of 150 locals of Ćelije in the village of Trpinja municipality in July 1991 was the first mass exodus of the population in the Croatian War. Although one of the tasks of the first United Nations mission UNPROFOR was to create conditions for the return of refugees, little had been done on that issue before signing Erdut Agreement. This prompted refugees to organize themselves in new communities in Croatia. These refugees from the region that are now living in Croatia organized regional clubs, refugee organizations and exhibitions. In addition, newspapers and other publications were published in other parts of Croatia, which included Vukovarske Novine, Hrvatski Tovarnik, Iločki list, Lovaski list, Baranjske novine, Vukovarac and Zov Srijema. There also were organized protests against UNPROFOR and blockades of official UNPROFOR crossings between region and Croatia. By the end of UNTAES mandate, only two Catholic churches in region still were in regular function.

=== Events after the completion of reintegration ===
Upon the completion of the reintegration of the region and UNTAES departure the new United Nations Civilian Police Support Group (UNPSG) was deployed to the region from 16 January 1998 to 15 October 1998. Up until 2007 the OSCE Mission to Croatia remained active in the country with a focus on the region which was under the UNTAES control. The mission provided the Police Monitoring Group for the region in the 1998-2000 period. The Joint Council of Municipalities was established as one of the central institutions in the region yet it was in no way legally linked as a successor to the Eastern Slavonia, Baranja and Western Syrmia. In the former administrative centre and the largest town of Vukovar, the consulate general of the Republic of Serbia was opened in 1998. A large number of Serbian minority institutions in the area were established or continued to work, such as the Eparchy of Osječko polje and Baranja, Radio Borovo, the Association for Serbian language and literature in the Republic of Croatia, the Independent Democratic Serb Party, and others. Croatia and Serbia still have open border disputes in this area around the two islands on the Danube – the Island of Vukovar and the Island of Šarengrad.

== Geography ==
The territory of former Eastern Slavonia, Baranja and Western Syrmia is part of the Central European Pannonian Basin. The eastern border of the region was mostly the Danube river, while approximately one third of the western border was the Drava river. The Kopački rit natural preserve was located near the confluence of Drava and Danube, and it formed a major geographical barrier – there were no road or rail connections between Baranja and the southern parts of the territory, except through Serbia.

Other boundaries were not natural boundaries: the border with Hungary in the north had existed since the Kingdom of Serbs, Croats and Slovenes, the eastern border with FR Yugoslavia partly existed since the Kingdom of Slavonia (on the Danube) and was partly set with the formation of SFR Yugoslavia, while the border with the rest of Croatia in the west and south was formed after the fronts were settled in the first phase of the Croatian War of Independence.

Eastern Slavonia, Baranja and Western Syrmia on its territory had 124 settlements, and with its 193,510 inhabitants, it was the largest Serbian Autonomous Oblast by population created on the territory of Croatia. Eastern Slavonia is a mostly flat area, with the best type of soil where agriculture is highly developed, particularly on wheat fields. It also has several forests as well as vineyards. The Đeletovci Oil Fields are located between the villages of Đeletovci, Banovci and Nijemci.

Traffic over the Brotherhood and Unity Highway (today the A3) was interrupted with the formation of the ESBWS. The water transport over the Danube river continued unobstructed. The Drava river was not navigated at the time. The railway line between Zagreb and Belgrade and the transport between Budapest and Sarajevo were also closed.

== Government ==
=== Presidents of the Coordinating Committee ===
- Slavko Dokmanović (7 August 1995 – 22 April 1996)
- Goran Hadžić (23 April 1996– 15 January 1998)

=== Chairmen of the Executive Committee ===
- Borislav Držajić (7 August 1995 – 1996)
- Vojislav Stanimirović (23 April 1996– 29 May 1997)

== See also ==
- List of territories administered by the United Nations

== Notes ==
Region	until 1918	1918– 1929	1929– 1945	1941– 1945	1945– 1946	1946– 1963	1963– 1992	1992– 2003	2003– 2006	2006– 2008	since 2008
Slovenia	Part of Austria-Hungary including the Bay of Kotor See also: Kingdom of Croatia-Slavonia (1868–1918) Kingdom of Dalmatia (1815–1918) Condominium of Bosnia and Herzegovina (1878–1918)	State of Slovenes, Croats and Serbs (1918) Kingdom of Serbs, Croats and Slovenes (1918–1929) Kingdom of Yugoslavia (1929–1943) See also: Republic of Prekmurje (1919) Banat, Bačka and Baranja (1918–1919) Free State of Fiume (1920–1924) (1924–1945) Italian province of Zadar (1920–1947)		Annexed by Italy, Germany, and Hungary^{a}	Democratic Federal Yugoslavia (1943–1945) Federal People's Republic of Yugoslavia (1945–1963) Socialist Federal Republic of Yugoslavia (1963–1992) Consisted of the Socialist Republics of: Slovenia (1945–1991); Croatia (1945–1991); Bosnia and Herzegovina (1945–1992) Serbia (1945–1992) (included the autonomous provinces of Vojvodina and Kosovo) Montenegro (1945–1992); Macedonia (1945–1991) See also: Free Territory of Trieste (1947–1954)^{h}			Republic of Slovenia; Ten-Day War			
Dalmatia	Part of Austria-Hungary including the Bay of Kotor See also: Kingdom of Croatia-Slavonia (1868–1918) Kingdom of Dalmatia (1815–1918) Condominium of Bosnia and Herzegovina (1878–1918)	State of Slovenes, Croats and Serbs (1918) Kingdom of Serbs, Croats and Slovenes (1918–1929) Kingdom of Yugoslavia (1929–1943) See also: Republic of Prekmurje (1919) Banat, Bačka and Baranja (1918–1919) Free State of Fiume (1920–1924) (1924–1945) Italian province of Zadar (1920–1947)		Independent State of Croatia (1941–1945) Puppet state of Germany. Parts annexed by Italy. Međimurje and Baranja annexed by Hungary.	Democratic Federal Yugoslavia (1943–1945) Federal People's Republic of Yugoslavia (1945–1963) Socialist Federal Republic of Yugoslavia (1963–1992) Consisted of the Socialist Republics of: Slovenia (1945–1991); Croatia (1945–1991); Bosnia and Herzegovina (1945–1992) Serbia (1945–1992) (included the autonomous provinces of Vojvodina and Kosovo) Montenegro (1945–1992); Macedonia (1945–1991) See also: Free Territory of Trieste (1947–1954)^{h}			Republic of Croatia^{b} Croatian War of Independence			
Slavonia	Part of Austria-Hungary including the Bay of Kotor See also: Kingdom of Croatia-Slavonia (1868–1918) Kingdom of Dalmatia (1815–1918) Condominium of Bosnia and Herzegovina (1878–1918)	State of Slovenes, Croats and Serbs (1918) Kingdom of Serbs, Croats and Slovenes (1918–1929) Kingdom of Yugoslavia (1929–1943) See also: Republic of Prekmurje (1919) Banat, Bačka and Baranja (1918–1919) Free State of Fiume (1920–1924) (1924–1945) Italian province of Zadar (1920–1947)		Independent State of Croatia (1941–1945) Puppet state of Germany. Parts annexed by Italy. Međimurje and Baranja annexed by Hungary.	Democratic Federal Yugoslavia (1943–1945) Federal People's Republic of Yugoslavia (1945–1963) Socialist Federal Republic of Yugoslavia (1963–1992) Consisted of the Socialist Republics of: Slovenia (1945–1991); Croatia (1945–1991); Bosnia and Herzegovina (1945–1992) Serbia (1945–1992) (included the autonomous provinces of Vojvodina and Kosovo) Montenegro (1945–1992); Macedonia (1945–1991) See also: Free Territory of Trieste (1947–1954)^{h}			Republic of Croatia^{b} Croatian War of Independence			
Croatia	Part of Austria-Hungary including the Bay of Kotor See also: Kingdom of Croatia-Slavonia (1868–1918) Kingdom of Dalmatia (1815–1918) Condominium of Bosnia and Herzegovina (1878–1918)	State of Slovenes, Croats and Serbs (1918) Kingdom of Serbs, Croats and Slovenes (1918–1929) Kingdom of Yugoslavia (1929–1943) See also: Republic of Prekmurje (1919) Banat, Bačka and Baranja (1918–1919) Free State of Fiume (1920–1924) (1924–1945) Italian province of Zadar (1920–1947)		Independent State of Croatia (1941–1945) Puppet state of Germany. Parts annexed by Italy. Međimurje and Baranja annexed by Hungary.	Democratic Federal Yugoslavia (1943–1945) Federal People's Republic of Yugoslavia (1945–1963) Socialist Federal Republic of Yugoslavia (1963–1992) Consisted of the Socialist Republics of: Slovenia (1945–1991); Croatia (1945–1991); Bosnia and Herzegovina (1945–1992) Serbia (1945–1992) (included the autonomous provinces of Vojvodina and Kosovo) Montenegro (1945–1992); Macedonia (1945–1991) See also: Free Territory of Trieste (1947–1954)^{h}			Republic of Croatia^{b} Croatian War of Independence			
Bosnia	Part of Austria-Hungary including the Bay of Kotor See also: Kingdom of Croatia-Slavonia (1868–1918) Kingdom of Dalmatia (1815–1918) Condominium of Bosnia and Herzegovina (1878–1918)	State of Slovenes, Croats and Serbs (1918) Kingdom of Serbs, Croats and Slovenes (1918–1929) Kingdom of Yugoslavia (1929–1943) See also: Republic of Prekmurje (1919) Banat, Bačka and Baranja (1918–1919) Free State of Fiume (1920–1924) (1924–1945) Italian province of Zadar (1920–1947)		Independent State of Croatia (1941–1945) Puppet state of Germany. Parts annexed by Italy. Međimurje and Baranja annexed by Hungary.	Democratic Federal Yugoslavia (1943–1945) Federal People's Republic of Yugoslavia (1945–1963) Socialist Federal Republic of Yugoslavia (1963–1992) Consisted of the Socialist Republics of: Slovenia (1945–1991); Croatia (1945–1991); Bosnia and Herzegovina (1945–1992) Serbia (1945–1992) (included the autonomous provinces of Vojvodina and Kosovo) Montenegro (1945–1992); Macedonia (1945–1991) See also: Free Territory of Trieste (1947–1954)^{h}			Bosnia and Herzegovina^{c} Bosnian War Consists of the Federation of Bosnia and Herzegovina (since 1995), Republika Srpska (since 1995), and Brčko District (since 2000).			
Herzegovina	Part of Austria-Hungary including the Bay of Kotor See also: Kingdom of Croatia-Slavonia (1868–1918) Kingdom of Dalmatia (1815–1918) Condominium of Bosnia and Herzegovina (1878–1918)	State of Slovenes, Croats and Serbs (1918) Kingdom of Serbs, Croats and Slovenes (1918–1929) Kingdom of Yugoslavia (1929–1943) See also: Republic of Prekmurje (1919) Banat, Bačka and Baranja (1918–1919) Free State of Fiume (1920–1924) (1924–1945) Italian province of Zadar (1920–1947)		Independent State of Croatia (1941–1945) Puppet state of Germany. Parts annexed by Italy. Međimurje and Baranja annexed by Hungary.	Democratic Federal Yugoslavia (1943–1945) Federal People's Republic of Yugoslavia (1945–1963) Socialist Federal Republic of Yugoslavia (1963–1992) Consisted of the Socialist Republics of: Slovenia (1945–1991); Croatia (1945–1991); Bosnia and Herzegovina (1945–1992) Serbia (1945–1992) (included the autonomous provinces of Vojvodina and Kosovo) Montenegro (1945–1992); Macedonia (1945–1991) See also: Free Territory of Trieste (1947–1954)^{h}			Bosnia and Herzegovina^{c} Bosnian War Consists of the Federation of Bosnia and Herzegovina (since 1995), Republika Srpska (since 1995), and Brčko District (since 2000).			
Vojvodina	Part of the Délvidék region of Hungary	State of Slovenes, Croats and Serbs (1918) Kingdom of Serbs, Croats and Slovenes (1918–1929) Kingdom of Yugoslavia (1929–1943) See also: Republic of Prekmurje (1919) Banat, Bačka and Baranja (1918–1919) Free State of Fiume (1920–1924) (1924–1945) Italian province of Zadar (1920–1947)		Autonomous Banat^{d} (part of the German; Territory of the Military Commander in Serbia)	Democratic Federal Yugoslavia (1943–1945) Federal People's Republic of Yugoslavia (1945–1963) Socialist Federal Republic of Yugoslavia (1963–1992) Consisted of the Socialist Republics of: Slovenia (1945–1991); Croatia (1945–1991); Bosnia and Herzegovina (1945–1992) Serbia (1945–1992) (included the autonomous provinces of Vojvodina and Kosovo) Montenegro (1945–1992); Macedonia (1945–1991) See also: Free Territory of Trieste (1947–1954)^{h}			Federal Republic of Yugoslavia Consisted of the Republic of Serbia (1992–2006) and Republic of Montenegro (1992–2006) Included Kosovo and Metohija, under UN administration, without control since 1999	State Union of Serbia and Montenegro Included Kosovo, under UN administration	Republic of Serbia Included the autonomous provinces of Vojvodina and Kosovo and Metohija under UN administration	Republic of Serbia Includes the autonomous province of Vojvodina; Kosovo claim
Central Serbia	Kingdom of Serbia (1882–1918)	State of Slovenes, Croats and Serbs (1918) Kingdom of Serbs, Croats and Slovenes (1918–1929) Kingdom of Yugoslavia (1929–1943) See also: Republic of Prekmurje (1919) Banat, Bačka and Baranja (1918–1919) Free State of Fiume (1920–1924) (1924–1945) Italian province of Zadar (1920–1947)		Territory of the Military Commander in Serbia (1941–1944) ^{e}	Democratic Federal Yugoslavia (1943–1945) Federal People's Republic of Yugoslavia (1945–1963) Socialist Federal Republic of Yugoslavia (1963–1992) Consisted of the Socialist Republics of: Slovenia (1945–1991); Croatia (1945–1991); Bosnia and Herzegovina (1945–1992) Serbia (1945–1992) (included the autonomous provinces of Vojvodina and Kosovo) Montenegro (1945–1992); Macedonia (1945–1991) See also: Free Territory of Trieste (1947–1954)^{h}			Federal Republic of Yugoslavia Consisted of the Republic of Serbia (1992–2006) and Republic of Montenegro (1992–2006) Included Kosovo and Metohija, under UN administration, without control since 1999	State Union of Serbia and Montenegro Included Kosovo, under UN administration	Republic of Serbia Included the autonomous provinces of Vojvodina and Kosovo and Metohija under UN administration	Republic of Serbia Includes the autonomous province of Vojvodina; Kosovo claim
Kosovo	Part of the Kingdom of Serbia (1912–1918)	State of Slovenes, Croats and Serbs (1918) Kingdom of Serbs, Croats and Slovenes (1918–1929) Kingdom of Yugoslavia (1929–1943) See also: Republic of Prekmurje (1919) Banat, Bačka and Baranja (1918–1919) Free State of Fiume (1920–1924) (1924–1945) Italian province of Zadar (1920–1947)		Mostly annexed by Italian Albania (1941–1944) along with western Macedonia and south-eastern Montenegro	Democratic Federal Yugoslavia (1943–1945) Federal People's Republic of Yugoslavia (1945–1963) Socialist Federal Republic of Yugoslavia (1963–1992) Consisted of the Socialist Republics of: Slovenia (1945–1991); Croatia (1945–1991); Bosnia and Herzegovina (1945–1992) Serbia (1945–1992) (included the autonomous provinces of Vojvodina and Kosovo) Montenegro (1945–1992); Macedonia (1945–1991) See also: Free Territory of Trieste (1947–1954)^{h}			Federal Republic of Yugoslavia Consisted of the Republic of Serbia (1992–2006) and Republic of Montenegro (1992–2006) Included Kosovo and Metohija, under UN administration, without control since 1999	State Union of Serbia and Montenegro Included Kosovo, under UN administration	Republic of Serbia Included the autonomous provinces of Vojvodina and Kosovo and Metohija under UN administration	Republic of Kosovo
Metohija	Kingdom of Montenegro (1910–1918) Metohija controlled by Austria-Hungary 1915–1918	State of Slovenes, Croats and Serbs (1918) Kingdom of Serbs, Croats and Slovenes (1918–1929) Kingdom of Yugoslavia (1929–1943) See also: Republic of Prekmurje (1919) Banat, Bačka and Baranja (1918–1919) Free State of Fiume (1920–1924) (1924–1945) Italian province of Zadar (1920–1947)		Mostly annexed by Italian Albania (1941–1944) along with western Macedonia and south-eastern Montenegro	Democratic Federal Yugoslavia (1943–1945) Federal People's Republic of Yugoslavia (1945–1963) Socialist Federal Republic of Yugoslavia (1963–1992) Consisted of the Socialist Republics of: Slovenia (1945–1991); Croatia (1945–1991); Bosnia and Herzegovina (1945–1992) Serbia (1945–1992) (included the autonomous provinces of Vojvodina and Kosovo) Montenegro (1945–1992); Macedonia (1945–1991) See also: Free Territory of Trieste (1947–1954)^{h}			Federal Republic of Yugoslavia Consisted of the Republic of Serbia (1992–2006) and Republic of Montenegro (1992–2006) Included Kosovo and Metohija, under UN administration, without control since 1999	State Union of Serbia and Montenegro Included Kosovo, under UN administration	Republic of Serbia Included the autonomous provinces of Vojvodina and Kosovo and Metohija under UN administration	Republic of Kosovo
Montenegro and Brda	Kingdom of Montenegro (1910–1918) Metohija controlled by Austria-Hungary 1915–1918	State of Slovenes, Croats and Serbs (1918) Kingdom of Serbs, Croats and Slovenes (1918–1929) Kingdom of Yugoslavia (1929–1943) See also: Republic of Prekmurje (1919) Banat, Bačka and Baranja (1918–1919) Free State of Fiume (1920–1924) (1924–1945) Italian province of Zadar (1920–1947)		Protectorate of Montenegro^{f} (1941–1944)	Democratic Federal Yugoslavia (1943–1945) Federal People's Republic of Yugoslavia (1945–1963) Socialist Federal Republic of Yugoslavia (1963–1992) Consisted of the Socialist Republics of: Slovenia (1945–1991); Croatia (1945–1991); Bosnia and Herzegovina (1945–1992) Serbia (1945–1992) (included the autonomous provinces of Vojvodina and Kosovo) Montenegro (1945–1992); Macedonia (1945–1991) See also: Free Territory of Trieste (1947–1954)^{h}			Federal Republic of Yugoslavia Consisted of the Republic of Serbia (1992–2006) and Republic of Montenegro (1992–2006) Included Kosovo and Metohija, under UN administration, without control since 1999	State Union of Serbia and Montenegro Included Kosovo, under UN administration	Montenegro	
Vardar Macedonia	Part of the Kingdom of Serbia (1912–1918)	State of Slovenes, Croats and Serbs (1918) Kingdom of Serbs, Croats and Slovenes (1918–1929) Kingdom of Yugoslavia (1929–1943) See also: Republic of Prekmurje (1919) Banat, Bačka and Baranja (1918–1919) Free State of Fiume (1920–1924) (1924–1945) Italian province of Zadar (1920–1947)		Annexed by the Kingdom of Bulgaria (1941–1944)	Democratic Federal Yugoslavia (1943–1945) Federal People's Republic of Yugoslavia (1945–1963) Socialist Federal Republic of Yugoslavia (1963–1992) Consisted of the Socialist Republics of: Slovenia (1945–1991); Croatia (1945–1991); Bosnia and Herzegovina (1945–1992) Serbia (1945–1992) (included the autonomous provinces of Vojvodina and Kosovo) Montenegro (1945–1992); Macedonia (1945–1991) See also: Free Territory of Trieste (1947–1954)^{h}			Republic of North Macedonia^{g}			
^{a} Prekmurje annexed by Hungary.; ^{b} See also: SAO Kninska Krajina (1990) → SAO Krajina (1990–1991); and SAO Eastern Slavonia, Baranja and Western Syrmia (1990–1991), SAO Western Slavonia (1990–1991) and the Republic of Serbian Krajina (1990–1995), all replaced by the UN Transitional Administration for Eastern Slavonia, Baranja and Western Sirmium (1996–1998).; ^{c} See also: Republic of Bosnia and Herzegovina; Croatian Republic of Herzeg-Bosnia; and the Serbian Autonomous Oblasts (SAOs) of Bosanska Krajina, North-East Bosnia, Romanija and Herzegovina (1991–1992), which all combined to form the Serbian Republic of Bosnia and Herzegovina (1992–1995).; ^{d} Bačka was reannexed by Hungary (1941–1944), while Syrmia was annexed by the Independent State of Croatia (1941–1944).; ^{e} Including North Kosovo. See also: Republic of Užice.; ^{f} Annexed by Italy (1941–1943) and Germany (1943–1944). Smaller part annexed by the Independent State of Croatia (1941–1944).; ^{g} North Macedonia's official and constitutional name was the Republic of Macedonia until 2019. It was known in the United Nations as the former Yugoslav Republic of Macedonia because of a naming dispute with Greece.; ^{h} Free Territory was established in 1947. Its administration was divided into two areas (Zone A) and (Zone B). Free Territory was de facto taken over by Italy and SFRY in 1954.
