= Serbs of Vukovar =

Traditional ethnic community in Vukovar, Croatia

The Serbs of Vukovar or Vukovar Serbs are one of traditional ethnic communities living in the multicultural, multi-ethnic and multi-confessional eastern Croatian town of Vukovar.

During the Croatian War of Independence Vukovar became one of the major hotspots of Serb-Croat ethnic conflicts, especially at the time of the Battle of Vukovar after which the town became de facto seat of the self proclaimed Serb Autonomous Oblast Eastern Slavonia, Baranja, and Western Syrmia. After the Operation Storm, signing of the Erdut Agreement and the end of the UNTAES mission of the United Nations, a gradual process of reconciliation started aimed at the establishment of sustainable peace. Despite the absence of physical borders, Vukovar is often described as an ethnically divided town.

== History ==
=== Vukovar resolution ===
The Vukovar resolution was the document in which Serbs from Vukovar and neighboring communities, at the end of 1939, requested that the central Yugoslav government exempts Vukovar county from the Banovina of Croatia and annexes it to the Danube Banovina or future Banovina of Serbia.

=== Croatian War of Independence ===
In the summer of 1991, Tomislav Merčep, at the time a leading official in the Croatian Democratic Union (HDZ) and Secretary of People's Defense, was put in charge of the town. Ethnic Serbs in Vukovar were subjected to forced interrogations, kidnappings and summary executions in addition to having their homes and cafes blown up. NGOs in the city state that a total of 86 Serbs were killed or disappeared during Merčep's control of the town. These crimes occurred prior to the Battle of Vukovar in August 1991, when the town officially became a war zone.

After Vukovar fell to the Yugoslav People's Army (JNA) on 18 November 1991, the JNA imprisoned 2,000 people at the Velepromet industrial facility in Vukovar, 800 of whom were classified by the JNA as prisoners of war. Many were brutally interrogated, several were shot on the spot by TO members and paramilitaries, and others were sent to Ovčara, where they were killed in the massacre. Thousands more were transferred to prison camps in Serbia and rebel-controlled Croatia. There were also incidents of war rape, for which two soldiers were later convicted. The non-Serb population of the town and the surrounding region was systematically ethnically cleansed, and at least 20,000 of Vukovar's inhabitants were forced to leave. Vukovar was systematically looted after its capture. Serbia returned 2,000 pieces of looted art in December 2001. Overall, around 3,000 people died during the battle.

Vukovar would formally become part of the self-declared proto-state Republic of Serb Krajina. After the end of the war, Croatia and local Serb authorities signed the Erdut agreement in November 1995 and the region was reintegrated into the Croatian republic.

Serbs have long voiced their concerns about the crimes committed against them in the months before the JNA took over the town and the lack of accountability for the perpetrators. The matter has remained unresolved, with Merčep only being sentenced in 2017 for crimes committed by his units elsewhere. He died in November 2020.

=== Contemporary period ===
The President of Serbia Boris Tadić paid a visit to Vukovar in 2010. President Boris Tadić and his delegation arrived to Vukovar on a Danube ferryboat Golubica ('Dove', referring to the Vučedol Dove). Delegation started its visit by meeting the Mayor of Vukovar where they submitted documentation from the Vukovar hospital which was taken by Serb forces. President Tadić then visited Ovčara camp where he issued apology for the Vukovar massacre and laid wreaths in respect to the victims.

According to data from the 2011 census, the Serbs accounted for one third of town population, which was the legal prerequisite for obligatory introduction of Serbian (Cyrillic) name of the city to become co-official under Croatian Constitutional law on national minorities rights. In 2013, this has re-ignited a political discussion on the matter, continuing on the 2009 local promulgation of Serbian Cyrillic as available for public use.

In 2019, Mayor of Vukovar Ivan Penava of the Croatian Democratic Union said that Vukovar was the "epicenter of continued, creeping Greater Serbian aggression." Some of the media reported that major will leave his party what he denied. Subsequently, he meet with the Prime Minister of Croatia Andrej Plenković who stated that "HDZ policy was defined by the party leadership, while mayor Penava should deal with issues pertaining to the town of Vukovar". Prime Minister also stated that it is his party strategic interest to cooperate with the Independent Democratic Serb Party and the Serb community, policy which was based on the policy of the first Croatian President Franjo Tuđman and that major Penava should understand it even better as fellow citizens from Serb minority have supported him at the Vukovar elections.

== Demographics ==
According to data from the 2021 census, the number of ethnic Serbs in Vukovar stood at 6,890, constituting 29.7% of town population. Serbs form second-largest ethnic group in town, after Croats. The surrounding rural region is ethnically heterogeneous. The Serb rural communities constitute the majority in physically adjacent Borovo and the municipalities of Trpinja and Negoslavci.

== Politics ==
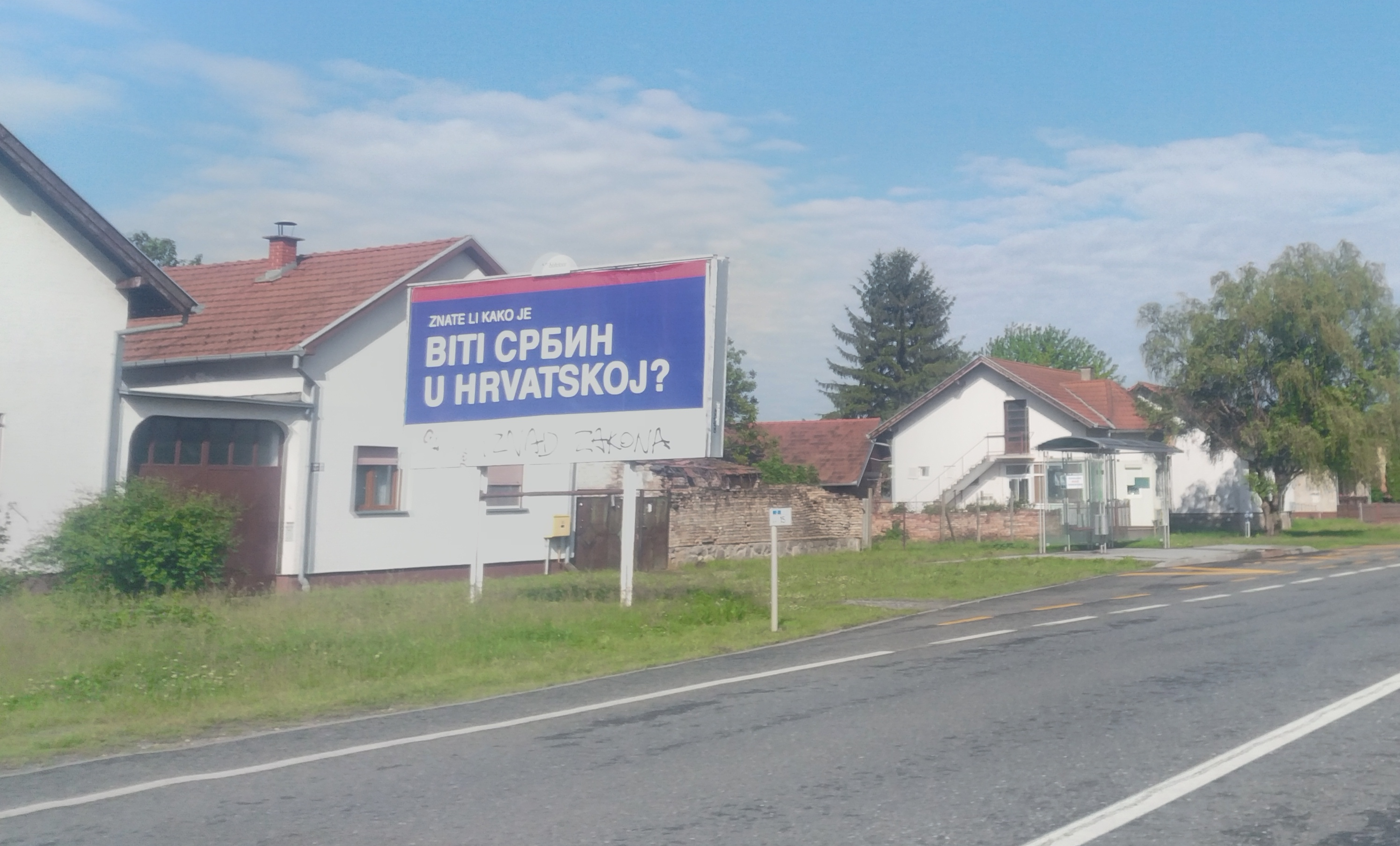
Independent Democratic Serb Party jumbo poster in Vukovar for 2019 European Parliament elections

Serbs play prominent role in a political life of the town. Constitutional Act on the Rights of National Minorities in the Republic of Croatia provides legal guaranties for the proportional representation of Serbs in all city bodies including proportional representation in the City Council. The member of the Serb ethnic community is guaranteed right to hold the post of city's vice-major.

Significant portion of Serbs in Vukovar traditionally vote for pan-national centre-left parties, primarily the Social Democratic Party of Croatia, successor of the League of Communists of Croatia (Croatian branch of the League of Communists of Yugoslavia), as a part of tactical voting against centre-right or right-wing Croatian political parties.

The town is the seat of numerous ethnic organizations and institutions, including the headquarters of the Joint Council of Municipalities (inter-municipal body of majority Serb munciipalities in Eastern Slavonia established by the Erdut agreement) and the Independent Democratic Serb Party (main minority party of Serbs in Croatia).

The Consulate General of Serbia was opened in 1998. The Consulate General is the only foreign representation in the town. Consulate is a polling place during the elections in Serbia for Serbian citizens in the region.

== Education ==
In the aftermath of war, two parallel system of education in Croatian and Serbian were developed resulting in a de facto ethnic division of pupils. In 2011 95% of students in Serbian-language classes were ethnic Serbs, whereas 86% of students in Croatian-language classes were ethnic Croats. This model is developed in accordance with the Constitutional Act on the Rights of National Minorities in the Republic of Croatia and is used by Serb communities in Borovo, Markušica, Bršadin and other settlements in eastern Slavonia as well as by Hungarian minority in the region and Czech and Italian minority in Croatia.

According to research, support among parents of paretns of ethnic Serb students in Vukovar for the separated system of education was 73% in 2001, 66% in 2007, and 75% in 2011. Support among Serb students themselves was 82% in 2001, 70% in 2007, and 68% in 2011. Among Croat students approval rate was 80% in 2001, 72% in 2007, and 71% in 2011, and among parents of Croat students was 66% in 2001, 68% in 2007, and 55% in 2011. According to data from 2011, an integrated curriculum in which only additional elective classes in Serbian language and culture would be provided was supported by 65% of parents and 49% of students in Serb community and 78% of students and 92% of parents in Croat community. Some authors argue that successful integration of the two school systems in Vukovar requires the development of a multicultural and intercultural model that would lead to compromise and changes in both communities. Ethnic distance among students in Vukovar is larger than among their parents.

== Culture ==
Main Serb cultural organizations in Vukovar include local subcommittee of SKD Prosvjeta and Association for Serbian language and literature in Croatia.

Church of St. Nicholas in Vukovar is one of the oldest baroque Serbian Orthodox churches. Present day church was built in the period from 1733 till 1737. The Inventory of the Church of St. Nicholas, along with church itself, is listed in Register of Cultural Goods of Croatia as a protected cultural property.

Next to the Church of St. Nicholas is located Serbian Home, established in 1733, with current building dating back to 1905. Building is today subject to ownership dispute between the city and Serbian Orthodox Church.

Some Serb representatives express concerns that integrated education may lead to assimilation of Serb community maintaining the view that the existing model is the best one for Serb community as it is preparing students for higher education both in Croatia and Serbia.

== Media ==
Local Radio Dunav station broadcasting in Serbian is located in Vukovar, while Radio Borovo is major Serbian-language media in the region. As the town is located on the state border radio and television stations from Serbia are easily accessible in Vukovar with Radio Television of Serbia and Radio Television of Vojvodina broadcasting program for Serbs in eastern Croatia produced by Joint Council of Municipalities. Serbian-language printed media include Novosti (published by the Serb National Council), Bijela Pčela and Prosvjeta (published by SKD Prosvjeta), and Izvor (published by the Joint Council of Municipalities).

== Gallery ==
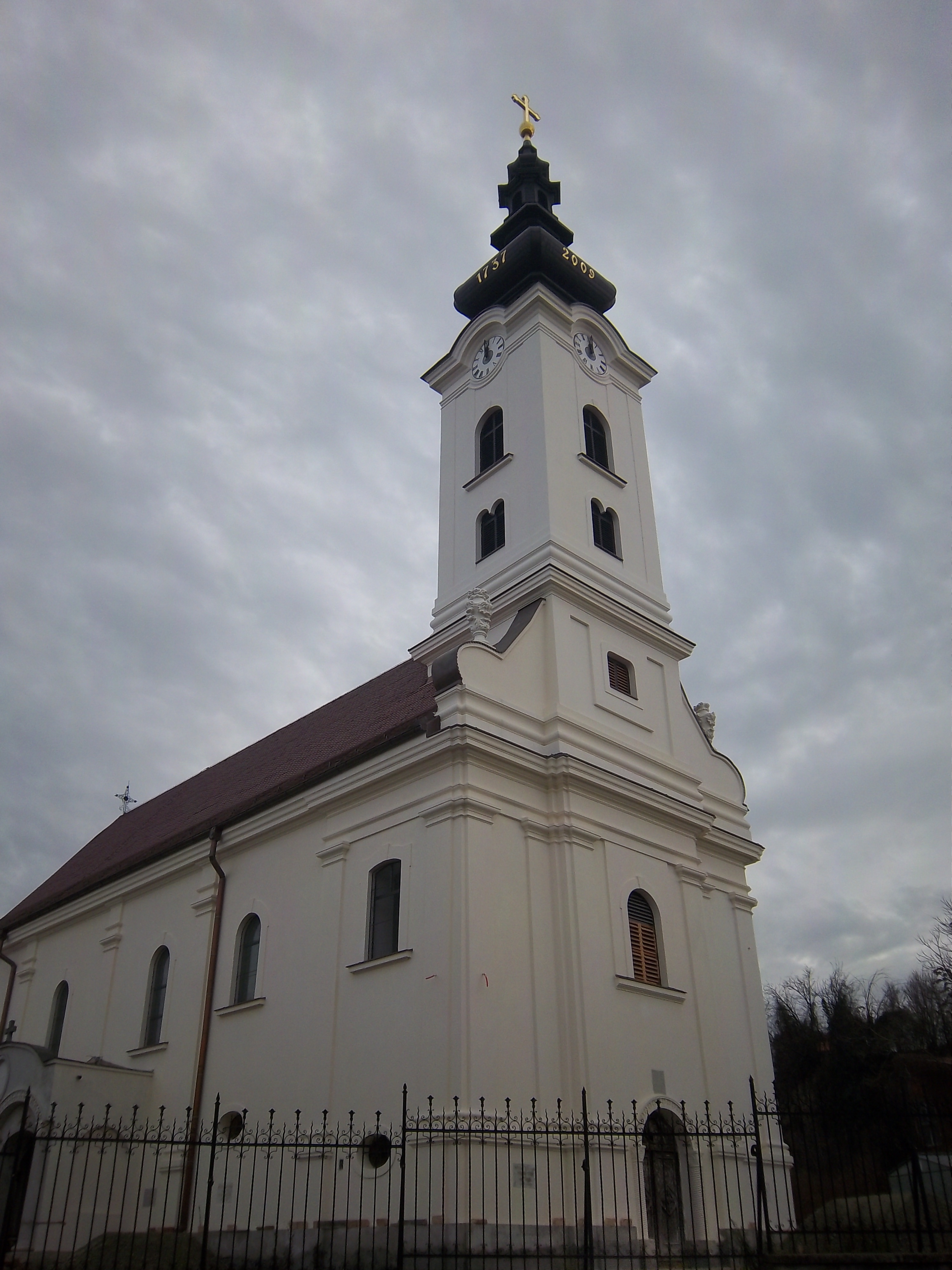
Church of Saint Nicholas

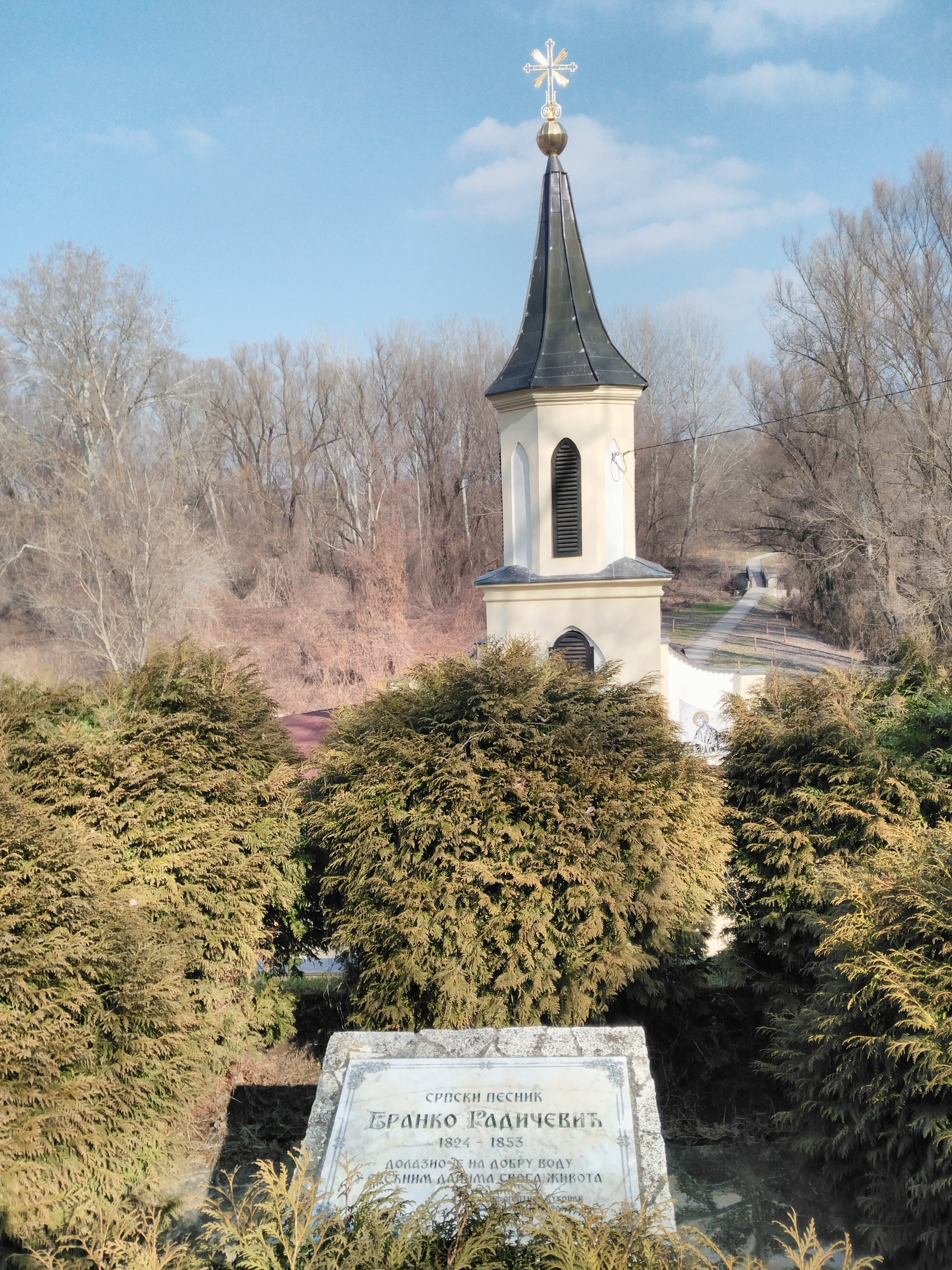
Church of Saint Petka

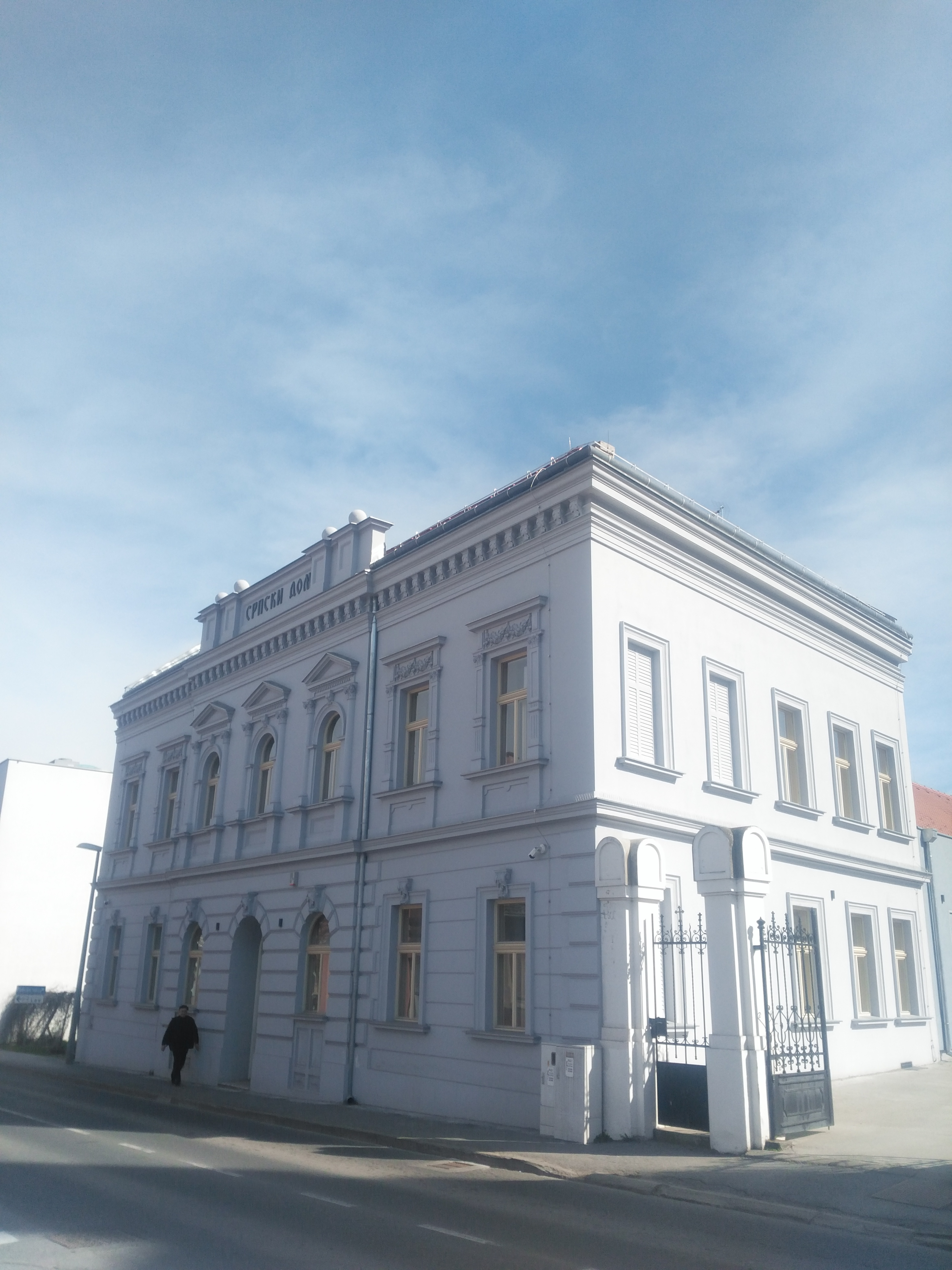
Serb House, Serb cultural center

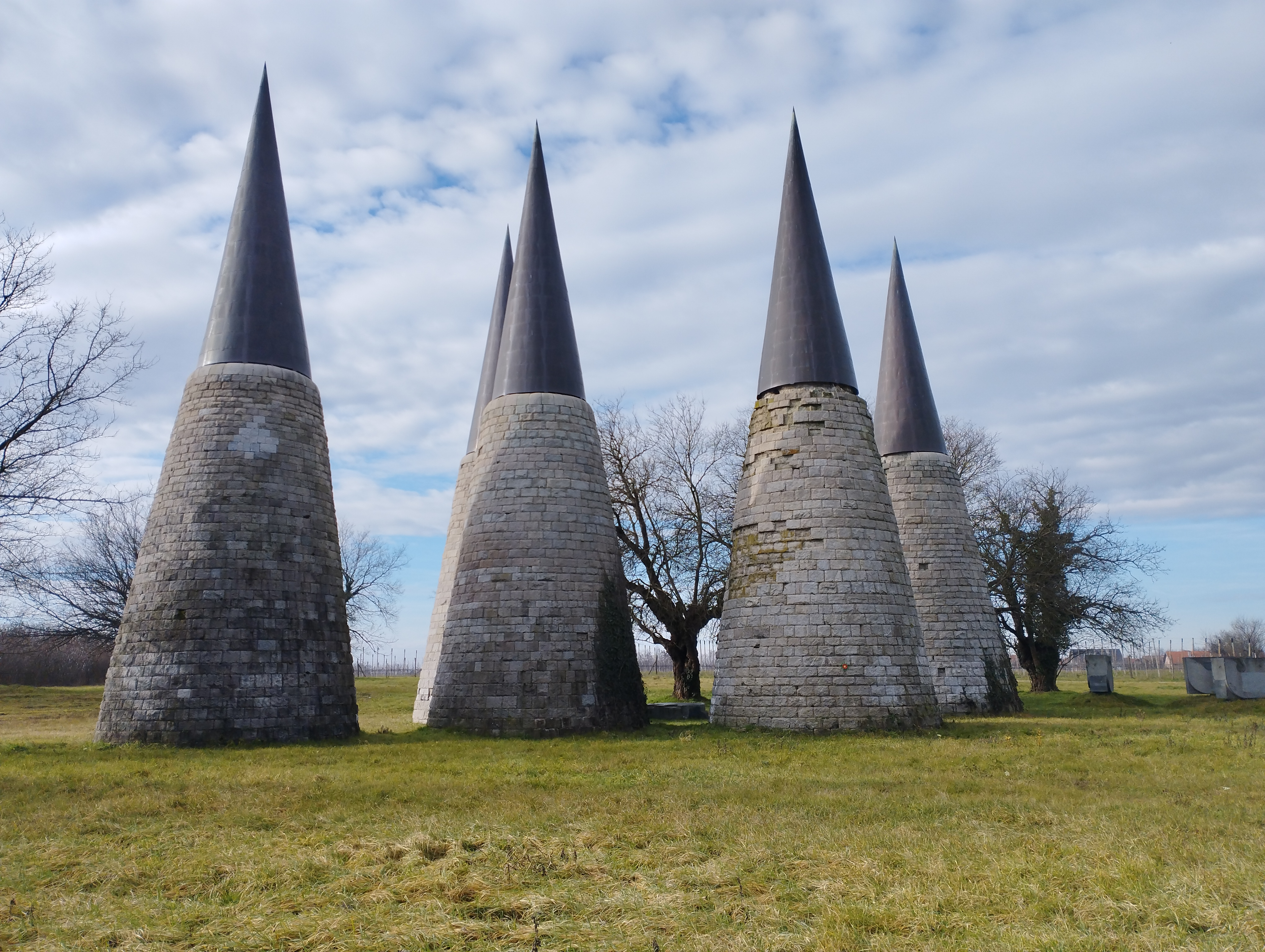
Dudik Memorial Park

== Notable people ==
- Milan Gajić – football player
- Đorđe Ivanović – football player
- Milan Mačvan – basketball player
- Siniša Mihajlović – football player and manager
- Zaharije Orfelin – polymath

== See also ==
- Serbs of Croatia
- Serbs of Zagreb

== Sources ==
- Filipović, Vladimir (2022). "Srpska pobuna u selima vukovarske općine 1990. - 1991" [Serb Rebelion in the Villages of Vukovar Municipality 1990. - 1991.]. Scrinia Slavonica (in Croatian). 22 (1). Department for the History of Slavonia, Srijem and Baranja of the Croatian Institute of History: 291–319. doi:10.22586/ss.22.1.9. S2CID 253783796.
- Ružić, Slaven; Živić, Dražen (2013). "Ratni mortalitet Srba (bivše) Općine Vukovar tijekom 1991" [War Mortality of Serbs of the (former) Municipality of Vukovar in 1991]. Scrinia Slavonica (in Croatian). 13 (1). Department for the History of Slavonia, Srijem and Baranja of the Croatian Institute of History: 261–276 – via Hrčak.
