= Borovo, Croatia =

Borovo Борово (Serbian) Borovo Selo - Борово Село
- Municipality
- Borovo Municipality; Općina Borovo; Општина Борово
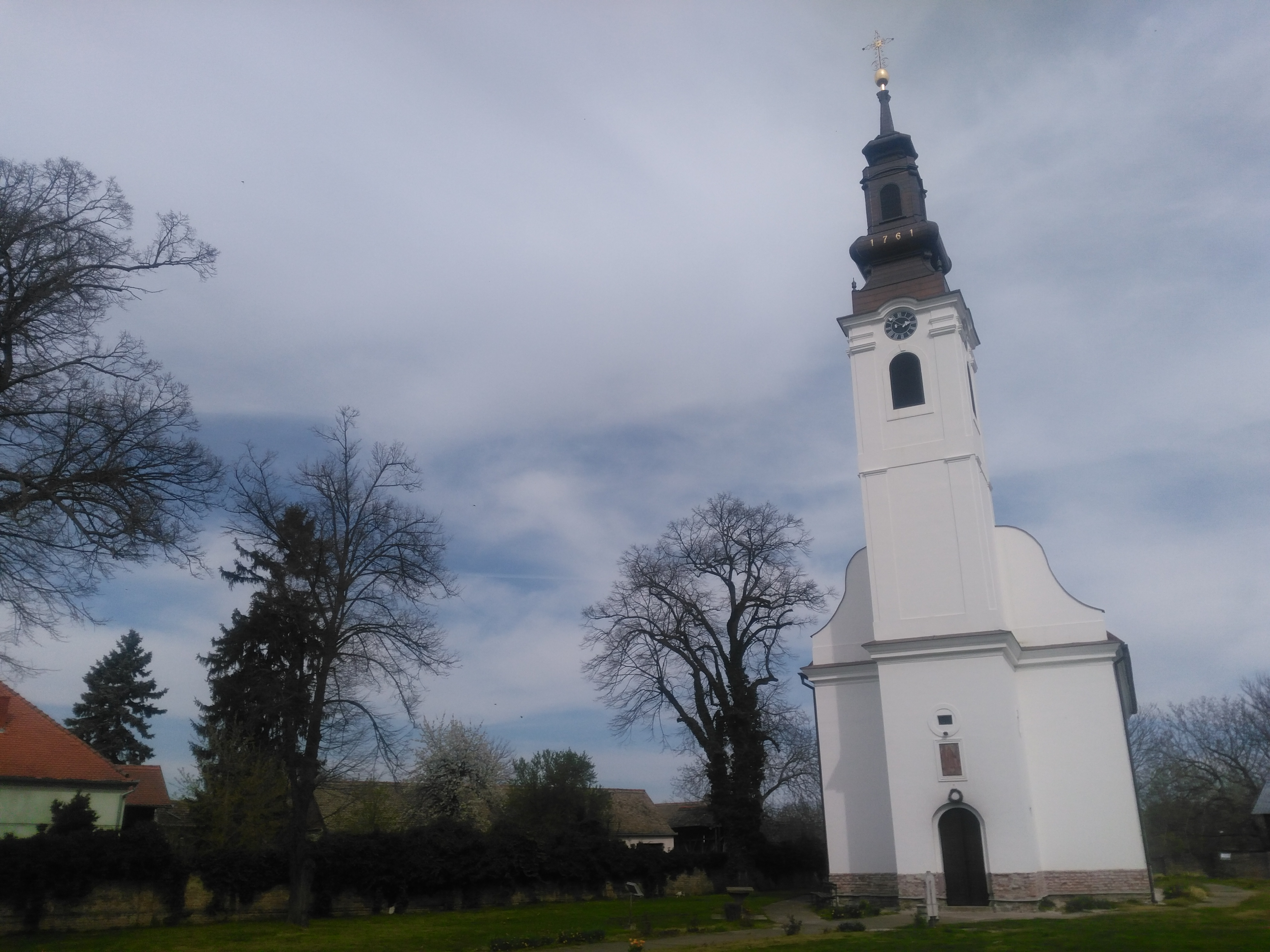
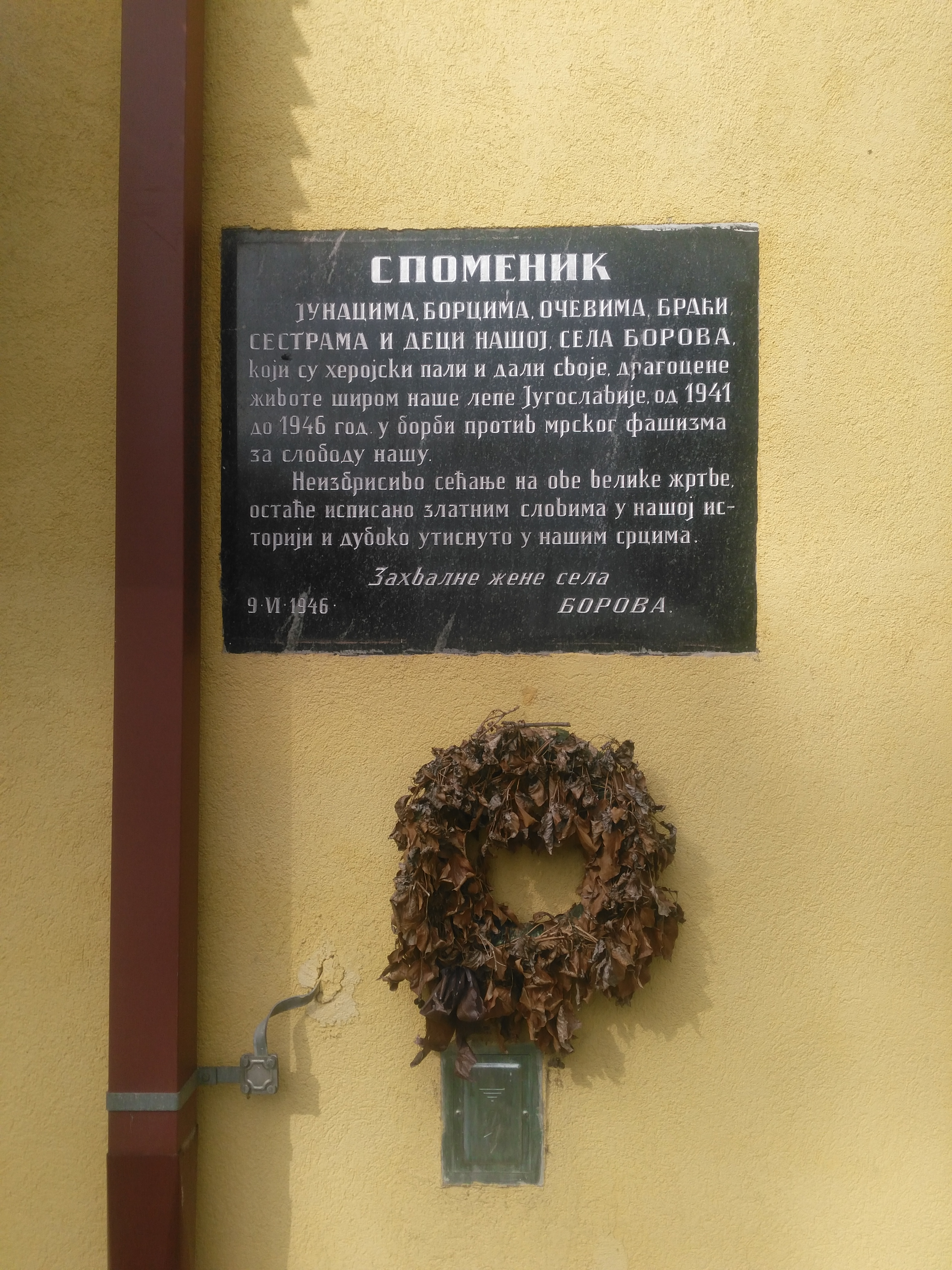
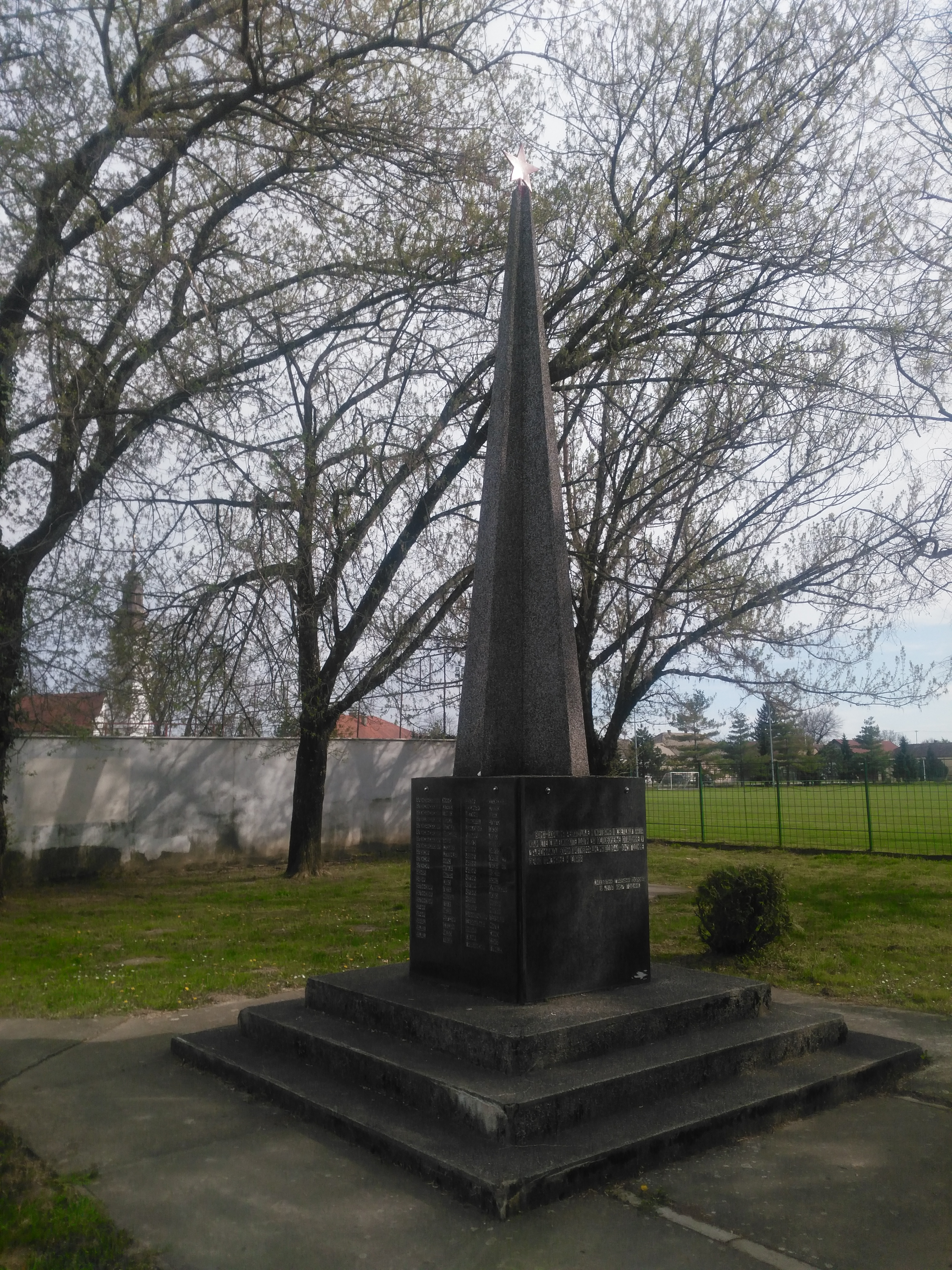
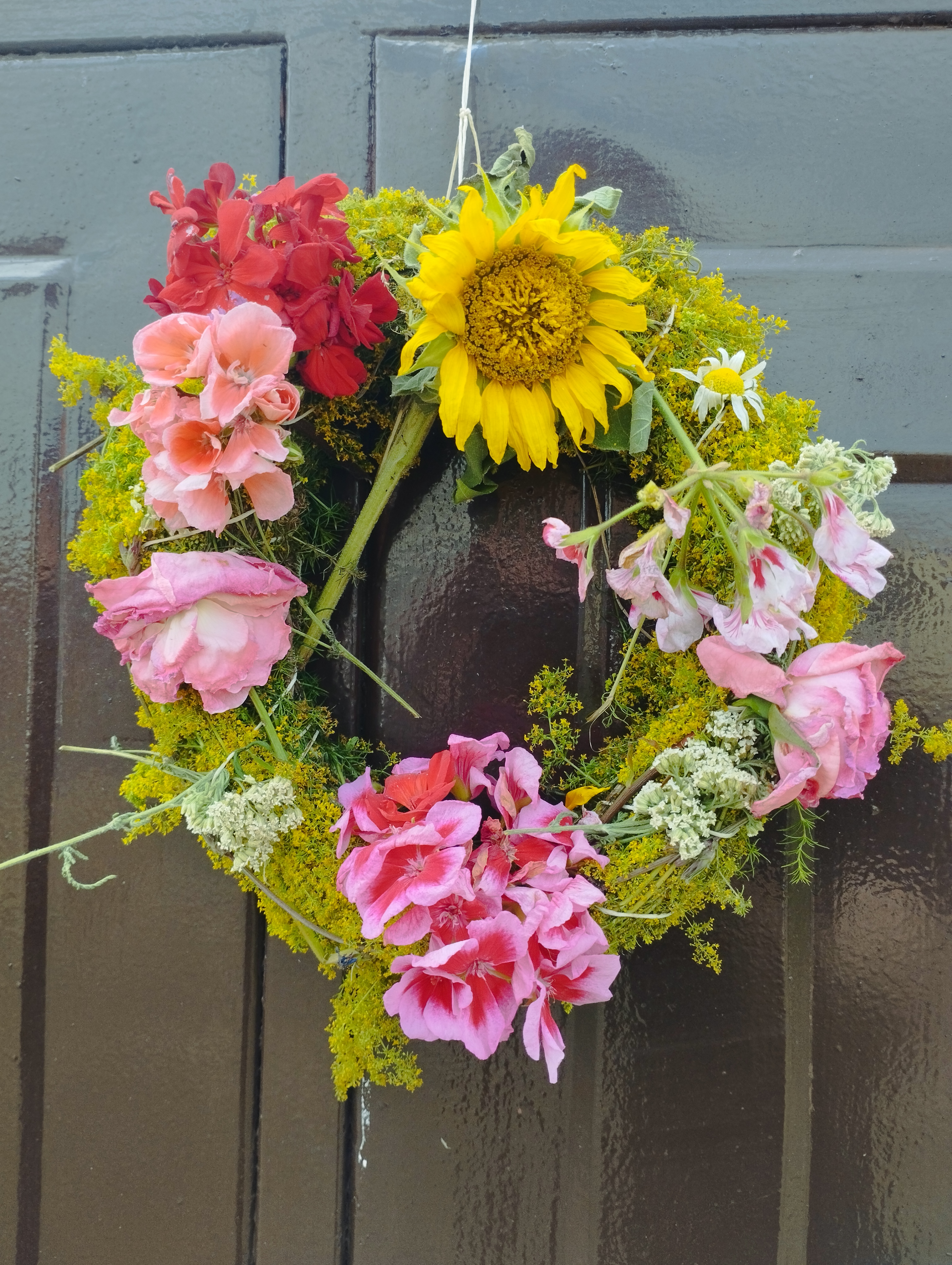
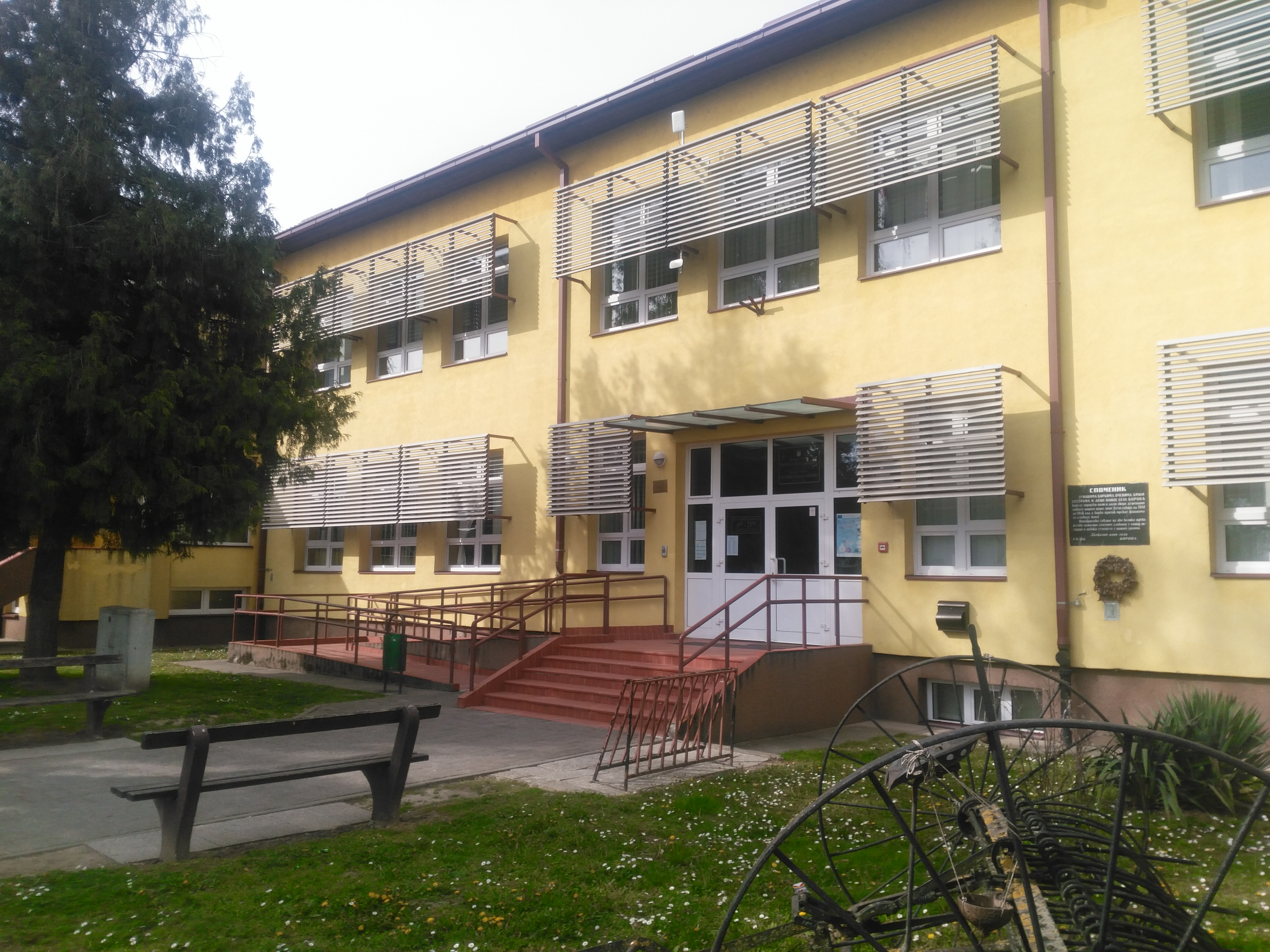
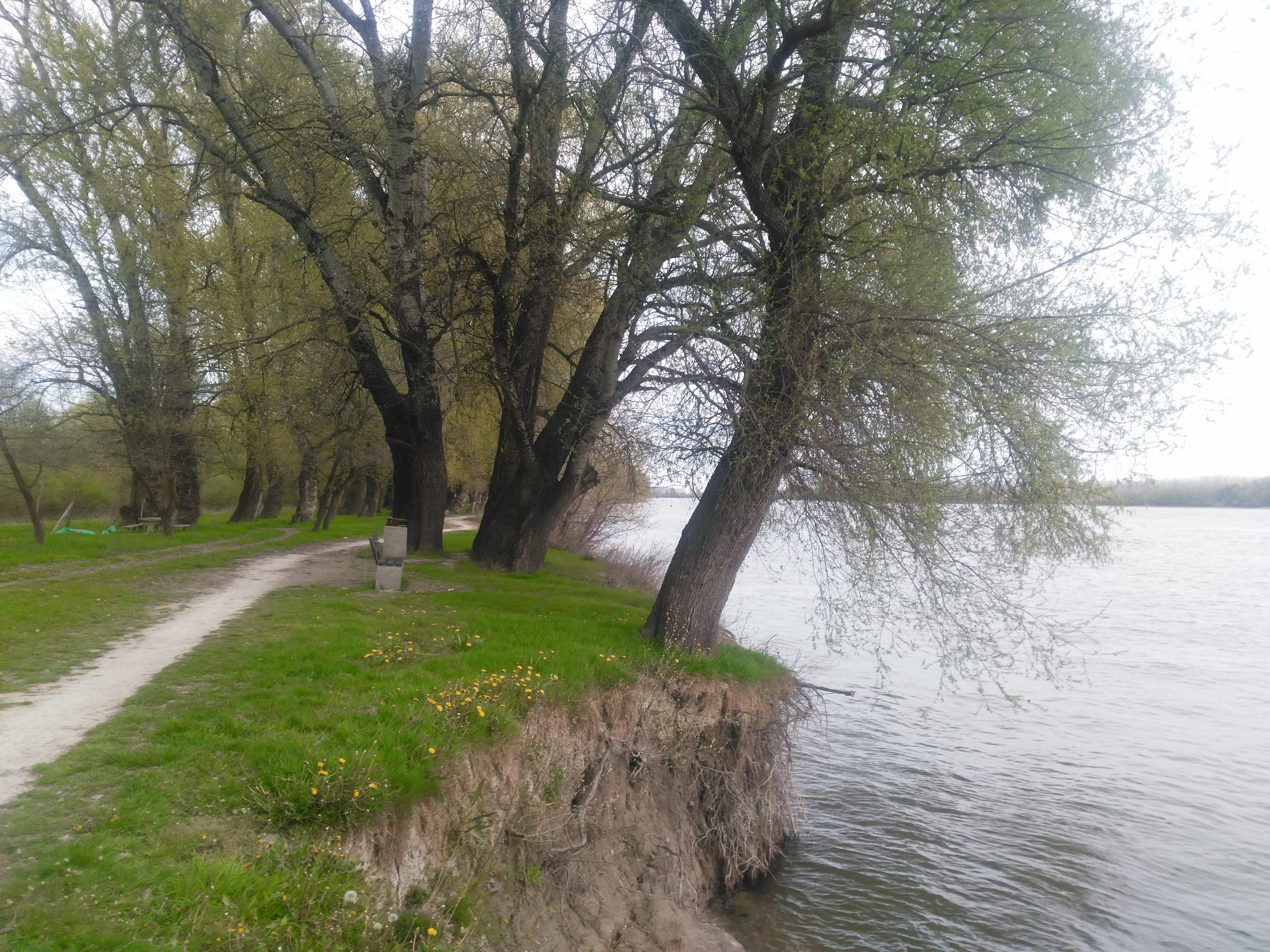
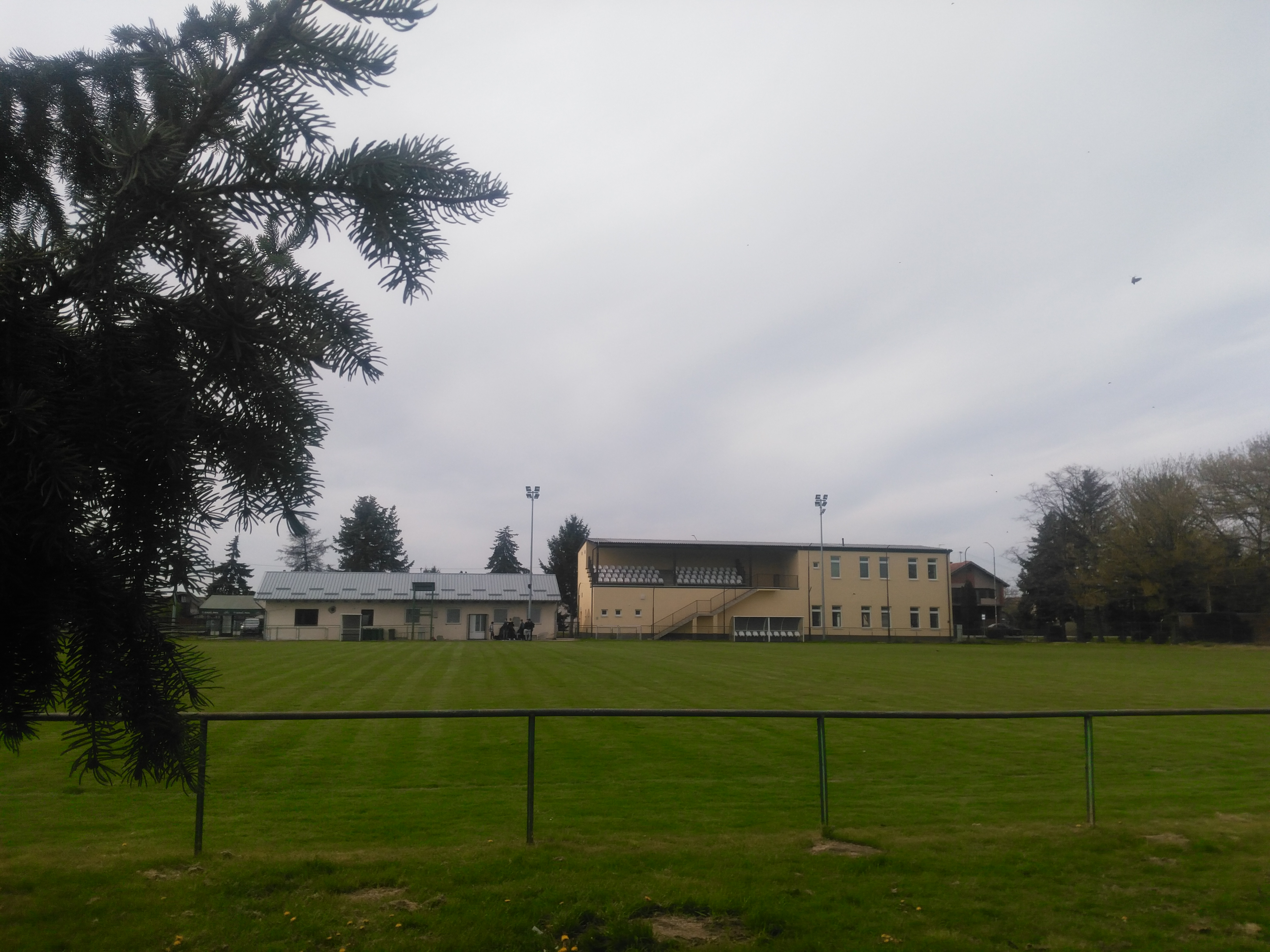
- Church of St. Stephen 1946 World War II memorial by women of Borovo 1967 World War II memorial Midsummer wreath Borovo Elementary School Danube in Borovo Sloga Football Field

- Flag Coat of arms

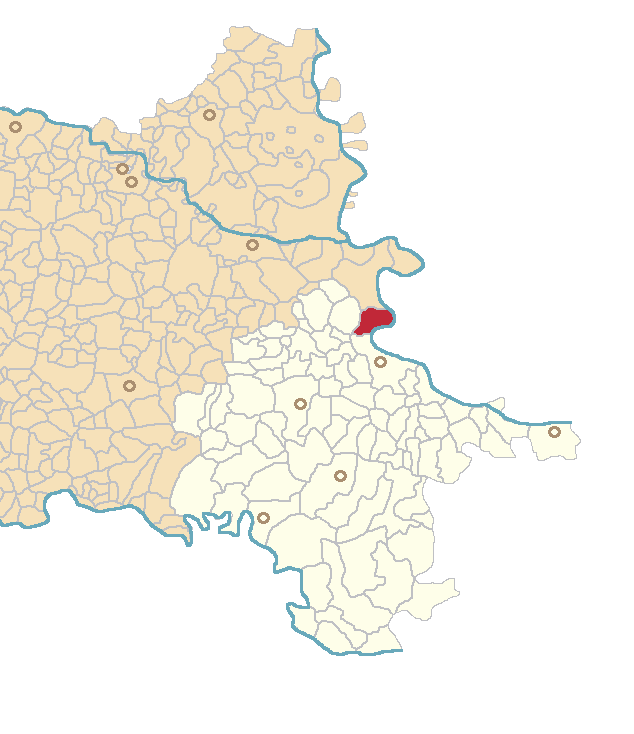

- Location of Borovo in Croatia Borovo (Croatia) Borovo (Europe)
- Coordinates: 45°23′N 18°58′E
- Country: Croatia
- Region: Podunavlje
- County: Vukovar-Syrmia County

Government
  - Municipal mayor: Zoran Baćanović (SDSS)

Area
  - Municipality: 28.2 km^{2} (10.9 sq mi)
  - Urban: 28.2 km^{2} (10.9 sq mi)

Population (2021)
  - Municipality: 3,555
  - Density: 126/km^{2} (327/sq mi)
  - Urban: 3,555
  - Urban density: 126/km^{2} (327/sq mi)
- Demonym(s): Serbo-Croatian: Borovčanin (♂); Borovčanka (♀) (per grammatical gender)
- Time zone: UTC+1 (CET)
  - Summer (DST): UTC+2 (CEST)
- Postal code: 32227 Borovo
- Area code: +032
- Vehicle registration: VU
- Official languages: Croatian, Serbian
- OIB number: 02417916452
- Website: opcina-borovo.hr

Borovo (Serbian Cyrillic: Борово, Hungarian: Boró, German: Worow), also known as Borovo Selo (Serbian Cyrillic: Борово Село; lit. 'Borovo Village'; (Note: to distinguish it from Borovo Naselje suburb which up until 1980 was also a part of the Borovo cadastral municipality)), is a village and a municipality in Vukovar-Syrmia County in eastern part of Croatia. Situated on the banks of the Danube river, it shares its border with Serbia and the municipality of Bač on the opposite side. The historical development of Borovo is closely linked with the Danube, which has played a central role in its development as a notable industrial hub in the region.

The etymological genesis of the toponym "Borovo" stems from the Serbo-Croatian word "bor" which signifies "pines." Although Borovo is an independent municipality, it is physically contiguous with the neighbouring town of Vukovar and functions as its satellite settlement. Borovo is the most populous settlement in Croatia in which ethnic Serbs constitute a majority of the population. It's Serb community also ranks as the second-largest Serbian community in the county, coming after the Serb community in Vukovar itself.

During the early 1990s process of breakup of Yugoslavia, Borovo was affected by escalating interethnic tensions in the Socialist Republic of Croatia. This volatile atmosphere culminated in the 1991 Battle of Borovo Selo, one of the first armed clashes in the conflict which became known as the Croatian War of Independence. Borovo became a part of the self-proclaimed unrecognized SAO Eastern Slavonia, Baranja and Western Syrmia within the self-declared proto-state Republic of Serbian Krajina. Since the end of the war and the UNTAES transition in 1998, Borovo is one of the municipalities which according to the 1995 Erdut Agreement elect its representatives to the Joint Council of Municipalities, a consultative body of Serb minority's cultural autonomy in the region.

== Geography ==
The municipality is situated on the Danube River, the second-longest river in Europe. It covers a total area of 28.17 km^{2} (10.88 sq mi). The territory is almost entirely flat, as it lies within the Pannonian Plain, and is characterized by fertile chernozem (black soil), which is well suited for agricultural crop production. Borovo is closely linked to the neighbouring town of Vukovar, to which it is physically connected, and it is connected to the rest of the country via the D519 road. Along its Danube riverbank, the municipality borders Serbia.

To the north, it borders the village of Dalj in the Erdut municipality, to the west, the municipality of Trpinja, to the south, the town of Vukovar and its Borovo Naselje district. Approximately 30% of the municipality’s total area consists of residential zones.

According to the 2021 census, the settlement itself had a larger population than several Croatian towns, including Vodnjan, Mursko Središće, Hvar or Orahovica.

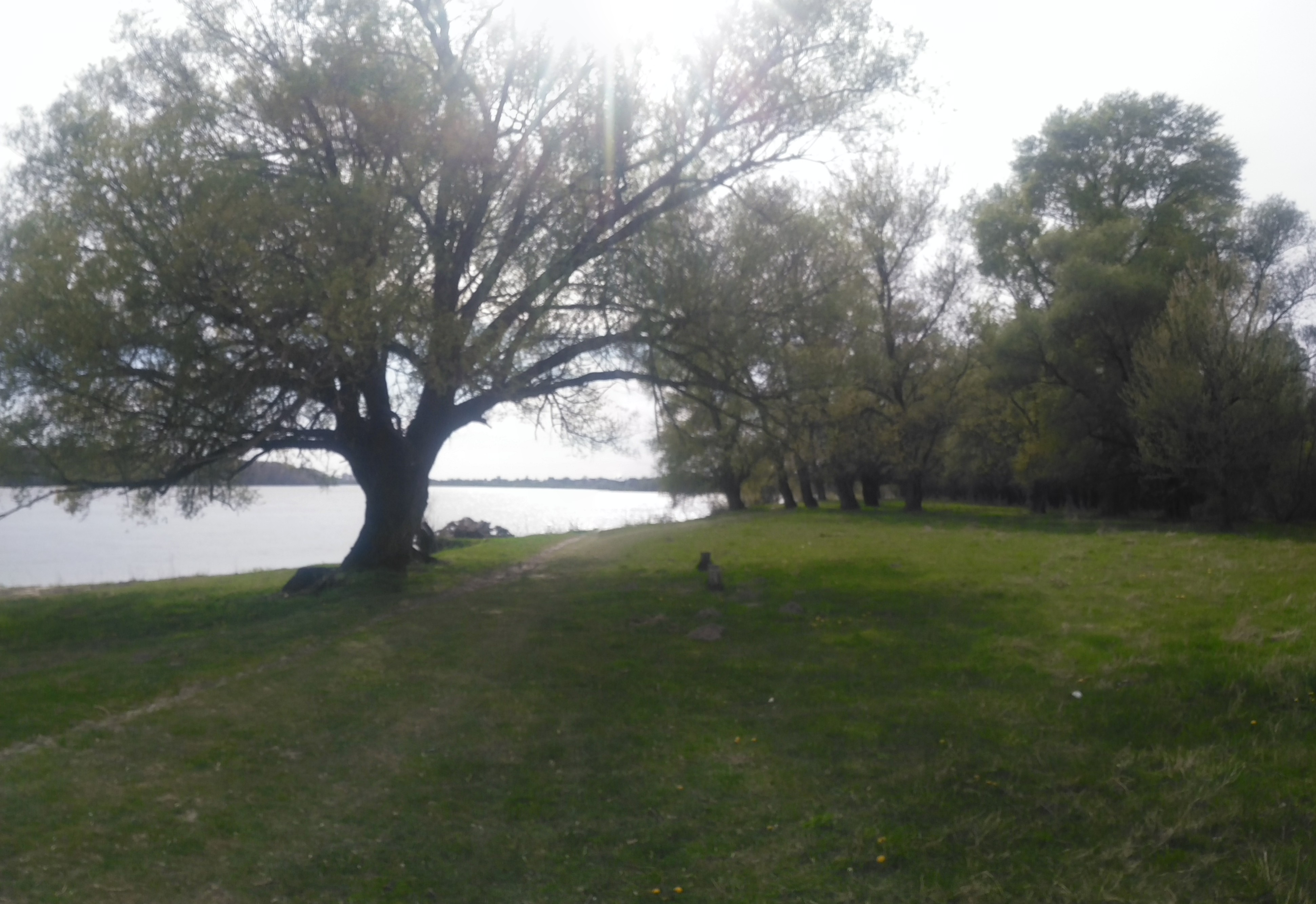
Danube in Borovo

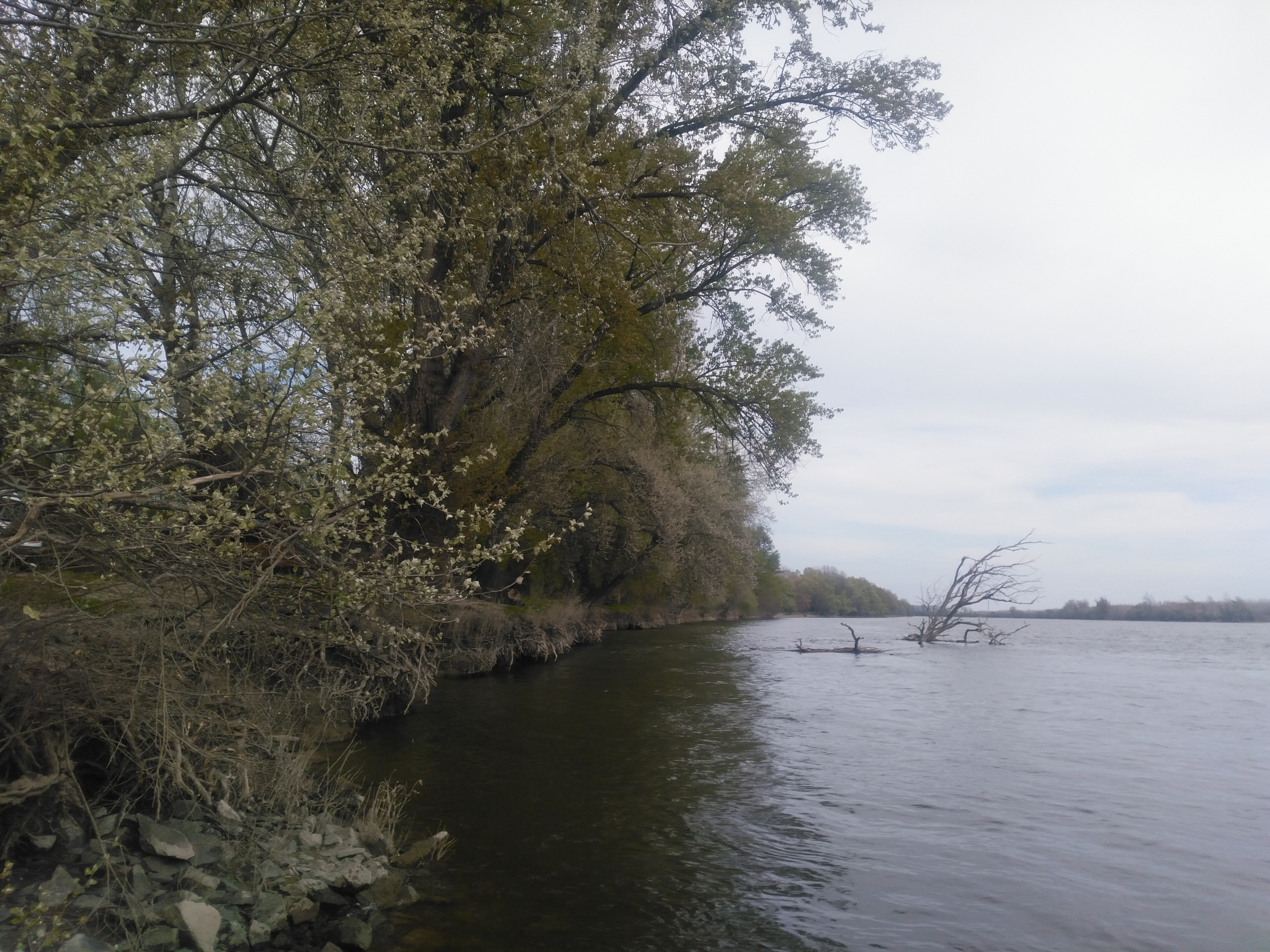
Danube in Borovo

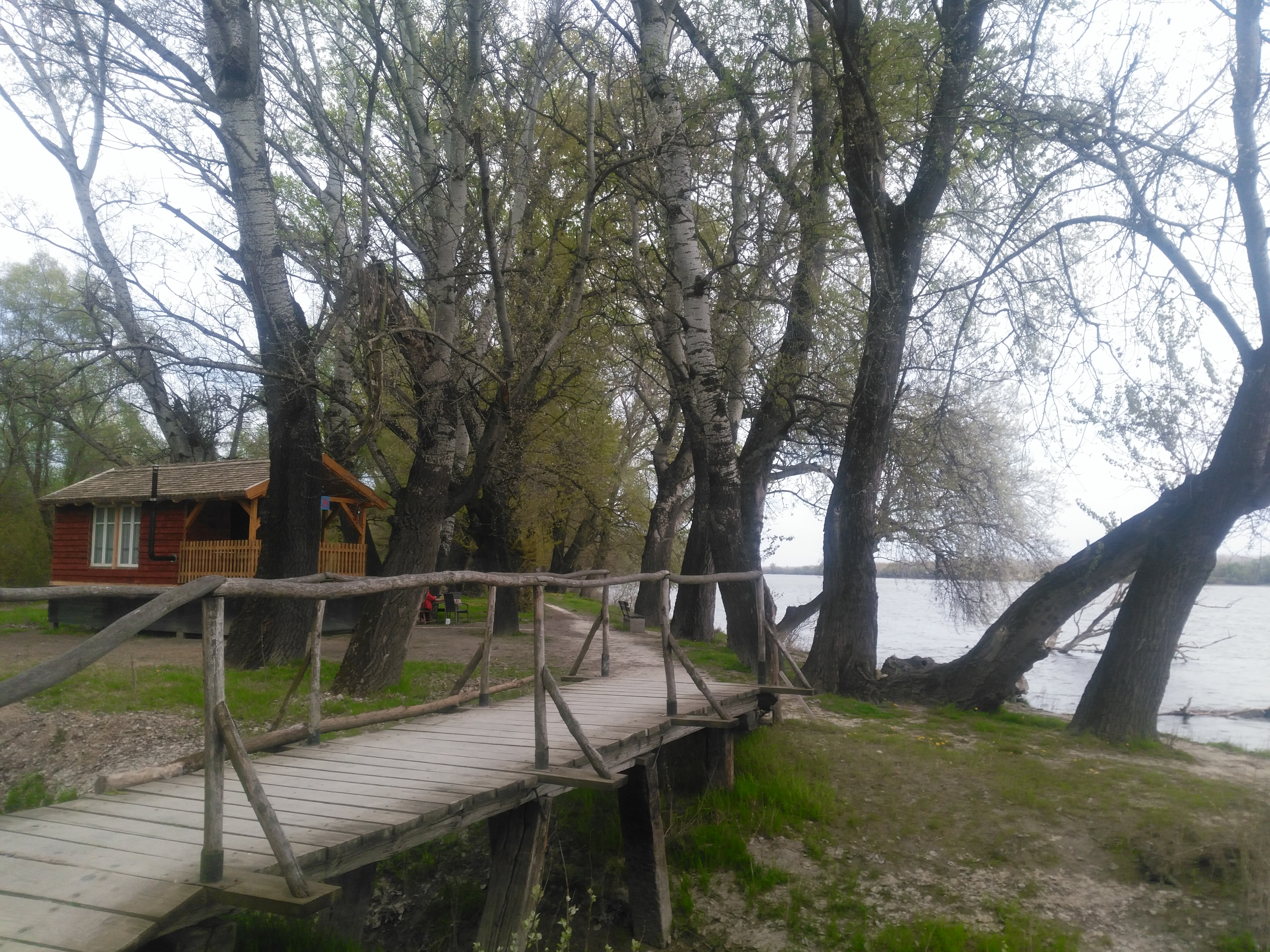
Danube in Borovo

== Climate ==
Borovo experiences a humid continental climate, characterized by hot summers and cold winters. During the period from 1981 to 1989, the highest temperature recorded at the local meteorological station was 35.5 °C (95.9 °F), measured on 3 August 1981. The lowest recorded temperature in the same period was −24.0 °C (−11.2 °F), observed on 31 January 1987. Snowfall occurs regularly in most winters, and temperatures below 0 °C are common between December and February. Spring is marked by variable weather conditions and a rapid rise in average temperatures with mild to warm days relatively cool nights. Summers are generally warm to hot, with occasional sudden heavy showers, particularly in late spring and early summer. Autumn, from mid-September to late October, is typically characterised by relatively low precipitation and extended periods of sunny weather with moderate temperatures, before a sharper cooling sets in during late October or early November. Compared to more western parts of continental Croatia, Borovo experiences a high number of sunny days and lower levels of precipitation.

== History ==
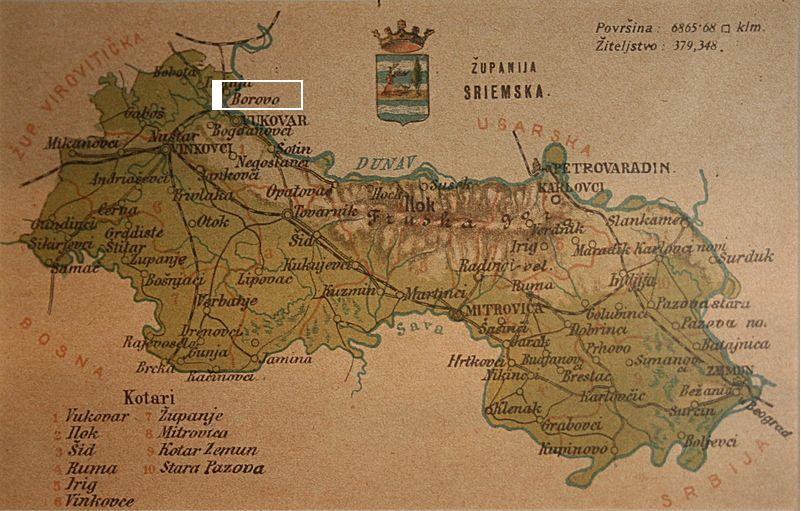
Borovo on map of Syrmia County from 1900

=== Prehistoric and Early Settlements ===
The area of present-day Borovo Municipality has been inhabited since the Stone Age. During the Late Iron Age, the region was settled by Celtic communities. Archaeological evidence from the Gradac site, located northeast of Borovo on a high bank of the Danube, confirms continuous human presence from the Neolithic period (c. 6250 BCE) through the Middle Ages. Due to erosion of the riverbank, remains of prehistoric and medieval settlement layers have been identified, including Neolithic and Eneolithic material as well as medieval structures. The site also contains burial grounds associated with the Second Avar Khaganate and the Bijelo Brdo culture.

=== Roman Period ===
In the Roman period, it formed part of the Danubian Limes, the fortified frontier of the Roman Empire. Archaeological evidence from the Šanac–Savuljski put site, located approximately 2 km northeast of Borovo, indicates the presence of a permanent or temporary Roman military camp dating from the 1st to the 5th century CE. Finds of Roman pottery, brick fragments, and traces of burning suggest military or logistical activity connected to frontier defence and river communication. The site also shows evidence of continued use during the Middle Ages.

=== Medieval and Ottoman Period ===
The region had been settled by Slavic populations during the Slavic migrations to the Balkans from the 6th century onwards, who gradually mixed with earlier inhabitants of Pannonia. In the 9th–10th centuries, the Hungarian conquest of the Carpathian Basin settlement of the Hungarians in the region.

The village of Borovo was first mentioned in 1231 as a possession of the town of Vukovar in the Kingdom of Hungary. At that time, the settlement was located further north than its present-day site. Following the Ottoman conquest of much of Hungary in the 16th century, Borovo was resettled around 1540 by Serbs originating from the upper Drina region and Polimlje. This migration led to a linguistic shift, as the local Ikavian reflex of the vowel Yat in the Shtokavian dialect was replaced by the Ekavian pronunciation.

=== Habsburg Period ===
Following the end of the Great Turkish War and the signing of the Treaty of Karlowitz the area was incorporated into reestablished Habsburg Kingdom of Slavonia. At that time, the Lordship of Dalj was established, and the village became part of its domain. The Serbian Orthodox Church of St Stephen the Archdeacon was built between 1761 and 1764 and at the time parish was under the religious jurisdiction of the Metropolitanate of Karlovci. During this period, Borovo acquired municipal status for the first time and was administered by a local knez (village head). In 1736, the village had 49 houses. By 1811, this number had increased to 231 households, with a total population of 1,754 inhabitants.

In 1880, Borovo regained municipal status for the second time. The municipality adopted a coat of arms in 1884, which continues to be used by the modern municipality.

=== Kingdom of Yugoslavia ===
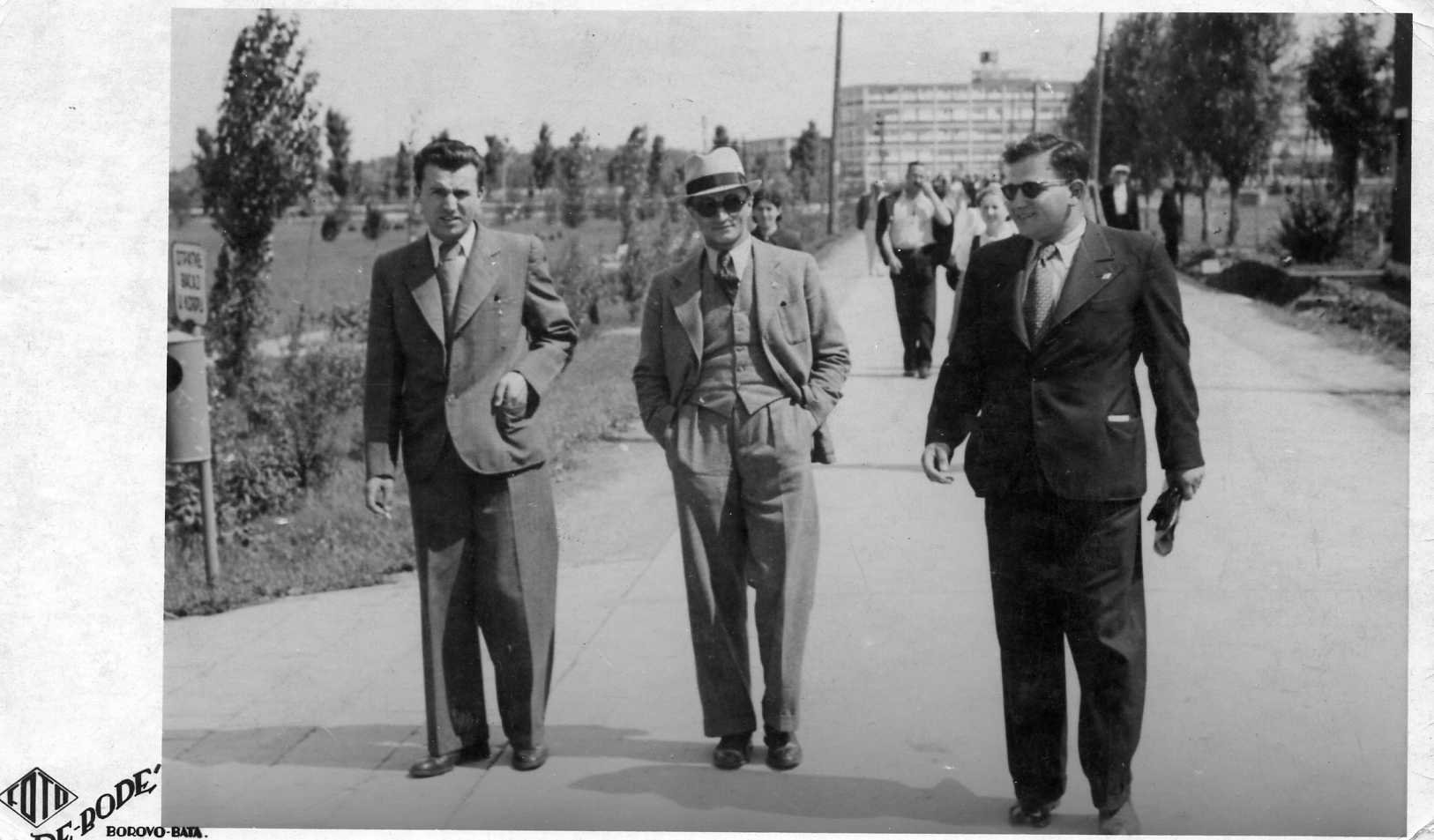
Baťa factory in September 1938

Borovo became an important regional industrial center during the existence of Yugoslavia. In the period between the two world wars, Czech entrepreneur Jan Baťa's factory Bata Shoes opened one of their major factories in Borovo creating the economic growth after the crisis that followed the end of World War I. At that time, as the result of the development of business, modern day Borovo Naselje was built up. The village itself rise from 2213 inhabitants in 1932 to 4530 in 1936. In 1935 Borovo even included and airfield and Yugoslav airliner Aeroput connected the town with regular flights to Belgrade and Zagreb. In that time Borovo became municipality for the third time in its history.

=== Socialist Federal Republic of Yugoslavia ===
In 1945 Borovo footwear factory was nationalized. While being state owned, factory was workers managed through the Yugoslav workers' self-management system. The company produced everything from shoe polish to shoeboxes and was selling its products across the former Yugoslavia through the 620 local Borovo shops. Company was producing around 23 million pairs of shoes a year in that period.

=== Croatian War of Independence ===
On 31 March 1991 Serbian National Council of Slavonia, Baranja and Western Syrmia (body established on 7 January 1991) organized a meeting in Borovo where it declared unification of the SAO Eastern Slavonia, Baranja and Western Syrmia with Vojvodina calling for an urgent extraordinary meeting of the Assembly of Vojvodina and National Assembly of Serbia to confirm the decision. Both assemblies received the request but never formally decided on it. The return of Goran Hadžić from the prison in Zagreb temporarily deescalated situation with most of road barricades being removed till the end of the first week of April. The escalation went further, however, when on 8 April 1991 the story was published about high-ranking Croatian officials shooting towards the village of Borovo. On the next day Josip Reihl-Kir tried to deescalate situation by stating that the firing with launch projectiles on Borovo was a response after the attack on Croatian Police without mentioning any Croatian officials. The interpretation of the event remained controversial and relevant in narratives about the beginning of the war in the region. On 1 May 1991 elderly Serb resident of Bršadin was killed by his Hungarian neighbour with media reporting that the murderer was a member of HDZ leading to blockade of the D55 road despite victim's family calls against it. Serbian media reported that the victim worn Serbian tricolor and was murdered by a Croat while on the same night two Croatian policemen were taken hostages in Borovo in the event which led next day to the Battle of Borovo Selo, and to the direct involvement of the Yugoslav People's Army in the conflict in the region.

The Battle of Borovo Selo on 2 May 1991 was one of the first armed clashes in the conflict which became known as the Croatian War of Independence. The immediate cause for the confrontation was a failed attempt to replace a Yugoslav flag in the village with a Croatian one. The unauthorized effort by four Croatian policemen resulted in the capture of two by a Croatian Serb militia in the village. To retrieve the captives, Croatian authorities deployed additional police, who drove into an ambush. Twelve Croatian policemen and one Serb paramilitary were killed in the battle before the Yugoslav People's Army (JNA) units from Osijek intervened and stopped the fighting. On 4 May a river link across the Danube was established between Borovo and the village of Vajska in Vojvodina. It was reported that between 10-30,000 passengers from Borovo, Vera, Trpinja and Bobota used the river service while JNA used it to evacuate local Croats from Borovo to Vojvodina with four (including a minor 5 years old girl) among remaining Croats being killed by paramilitary units.

Croatian independence referendum was called on 19 May 1991 while Serb local authorities called for a boycott of the vote, which was largely followed by Croatian Serbs. On 25 June 1991, the day that the Socialist Republic of Croatia declared its withdrawal from Yugoslavia, a self-proclaimed Serbian Autonomous Oblast SAO Eastern Slavonia, Baranja and Western Syrmia was established. In 1992, the oblast joined the breakaway Republic of Serbian Krajina. After the fall of Republic of Serbian Krajina rump Eastern Slavonia, Baranja and Western Syrmia remained as a short-lived Serb parallel entity. After the Erdut Agreement, the territory was reintegrated into Croatia within UN peacekeeping mission UNTAES. On 22 May 1997 Borovo Municipality was established for a fourth time. It became one of the founding municipalities of the Joint Council of Municipalities.

== Demographics ==
=== Population ===
National structure (2011)
1. Serbs (89.7%)
2. Croats (6.57%)
3. Slovaks (0.46%)
4. Hungarians (0.44%)
5. Others (2.80%)

According to 2011 Census Borovo had a population of 5,056 at the time. 89.73% of the population of municipality were ethnic Serbs (4,537 individuals). Second largest ethnic group were Croats (332) and there was also number of individuals who declared as follows: Ukrainians (8), Slovenians (2), Slovaks (23), Pannonian Rusyns (10), Russians (2), Romani (12), Poles (2), Germans (4), Macedonians (2), Hungarians (22), Czechs (3), Montenegrins (11), Bosniaks (14), Albanians (5) and others. About 100 individuals from younger generation left the village since the end of the war in search for a job in countries such as England, Norway, Australia and Canada. With pronounced issue of population decline in eastern Croatia caused by population ageing, effects of the Croatian War of Independence and emigration after the accession of Croatia to the European Union, the population of the municipality dropped to 3,555 residents at the time of 2021 census.

=== Languages ===
==== Serbian language ====
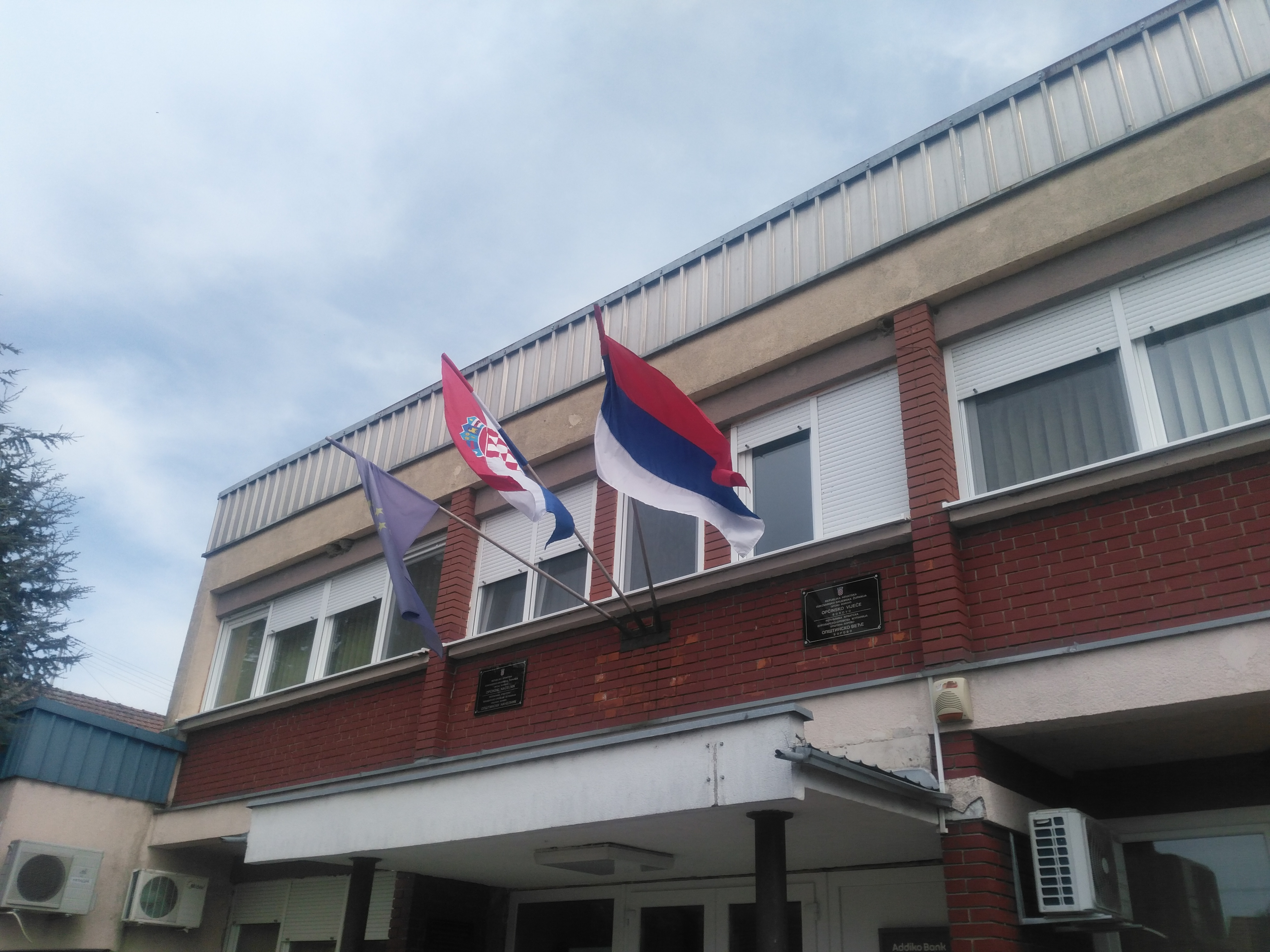
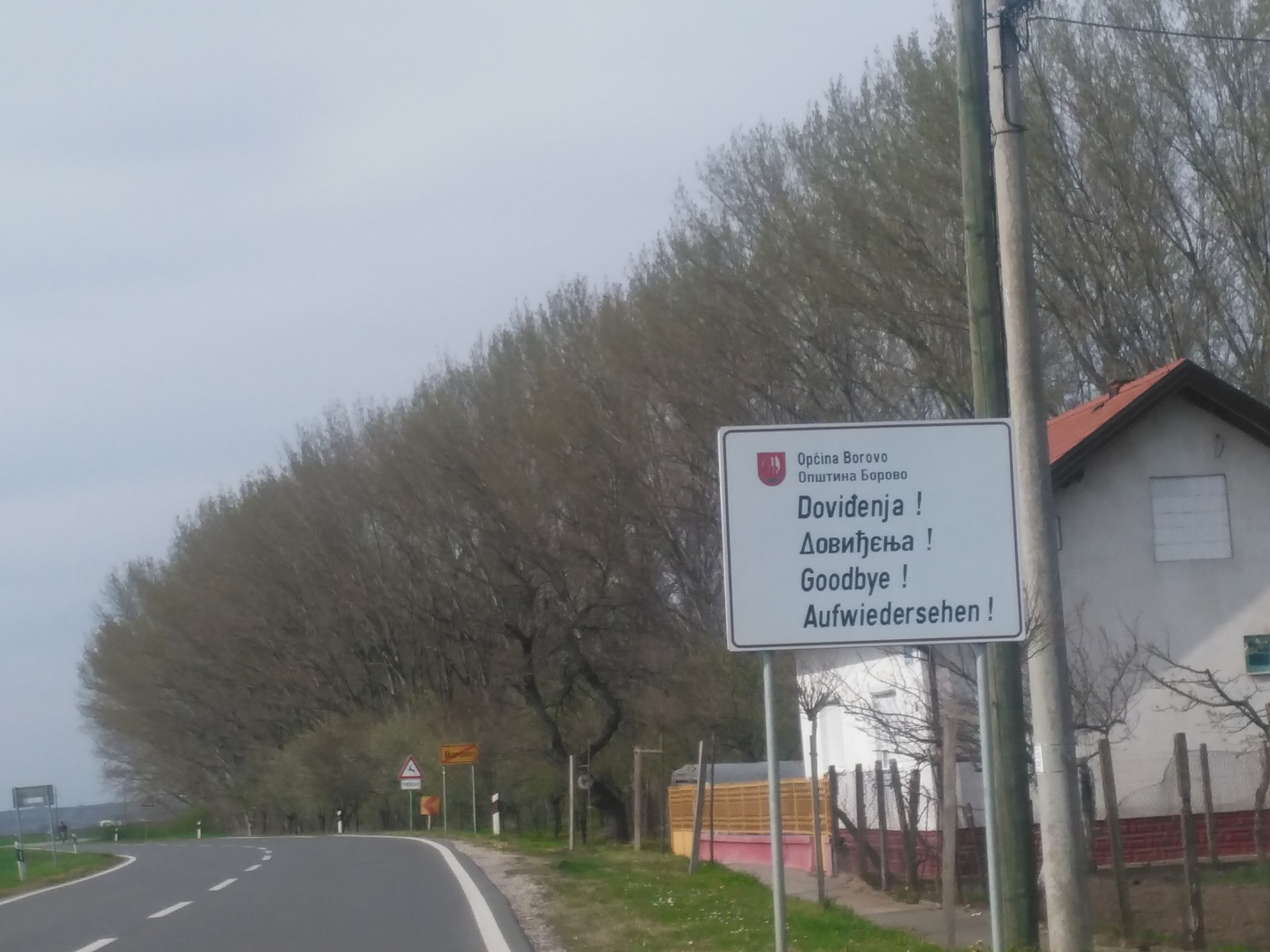
Municipal building with bilingual inscriptions and the flag of Serbs of Croatia. Below multilingual municipal exit sign.

Serbian Language and Serbian Cyrillic alphabet is the second official language in the municipality of Borovo alongside the Croatian language which is official at the national level. As of 2023, most of the legal requirements for the fulfillment of bilingual standards have been carried out, in contrast to most municipalities in Croatia. Official buildings, street signs and seals have Cyrillic, as do all official documents. There public legal and administrative employees proficient in the script.

According to the Municipal Statute, individuals who are members of the Serbian national minority are ensured the freedom of expression of national belonging and freedom to use their language and script in public and private use on the whole territory of the Municipality of Borovo. The statute guarantees that the Serbian Cyrillic alphabet will be used in the same font size as the Latin alphabet in the text of the local seals and stamps, on official plates of public representatives, executive and administrative bodies, as well as on those of legal persons with public authorities. Councillors or any other citizens have the right to get all of the working and official materials bilingually for any future and past sessions of the Municipal Assembly, and those materials must be in the same font size in both languages.

According to the municipal Statute, bilingual signs of the same font are used for written traffic signs and other written traffic markings, street and squares names and names of settlement and geographical localities on the entire territory of the Municipality. Equal public use of Serbian language is required on the basis of the Constitutional Act on the Rights of National Minorities in the Republic of Croatia and relevant national laws and the country is a party to the European Charter for Regional or Minority Languages.

==== Other languages ====
While only Croatian and Serbian enjoy official status, other languages were historically present and important in the region with some of them remaining in limited use up to the present day. With the development of industry in the interwar years the new Borovo Naselje suburb attracted newcomers from Czechoslovakia. Beginning in 1941 and during the World War II in Yugoslavia the Novo Borovo, a local factory weekly, published a section in German language called "Kamerad. Pressedienst der Deutschen Gefolgschaft der Borovoer Batawerke". As of 2020 German language is offered as an elective 4-8th grade course in the local elementary school. Church Slavonic language is occasionally used as a liturgical language in the local Eastern Orthodox church in Borovo.

== Politics ==
=== Joint Council of Municipalities ===
The Municipality of Borovo is one of seven Serb majority member municipalities within the Joint Council of Municipalities, inter-municipal sui generis organization of ethnic Serb community in eastern Croatia established on the basis of Erdut Agreement. As Serb community constitute majority of the population of the municipality it is represented by 2 delegated Councillors at the Assembly of the Joint Council of Municipalities, double the number of Councilors to the number from Serb minority municipalities in Eastern Croatia.

=== Municipal Assembly ===
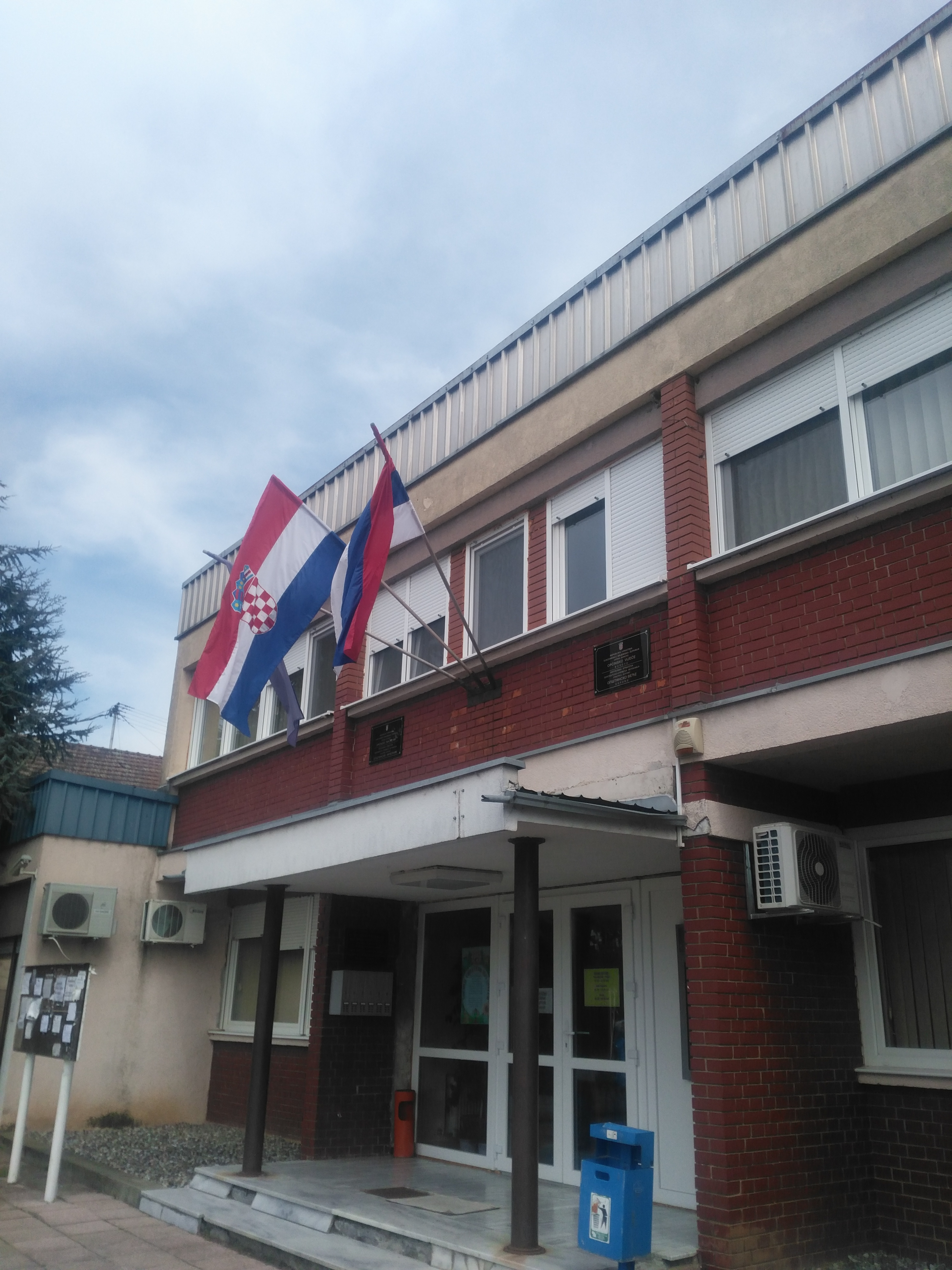
Municipality of Borovo building

The Municipal Assembly of Borovo is composed of 14 elected representatives. Out of a total of 3,345 eligible voters at the 2025 Croatian local elections, 1,254 (37.49 %) participated in the elections and the same number submitted their ballots. There were 1,182 (94.26%) valid and 72 (5.74 %) invalid ballots. The Independent Democratic Serb Party got 821 (69.45%) ballots and 9 elected representatives, the Democratic Alliance of Serbs got 247 ballots (20.89%) and three elected representatives and the independent politician Željko Lukić list got 114 ballots (9,64%) and one elected representative. In counties, cities, towns, and municipalities where the regular elections resulted in the underrepresentation of national minorities or ethnic Croats (where they constitute a minority as it is case in Borovo), additional elections were held on 5 October 2025. Croat electorate elected one additional representative from Independent Democratic Serb Party.

Summary of the 2025 Croatian local elections
Party	Votes	%	Seats
Independent Democratic Serb Party	821	69.45%	9 +1 (additional elections)
Democratic Alliance of Serbs	247	20.89%	3
Independent politician Željko Lukić	114	9,64%	1
Invalid/blank votes	72	5.74%	—
Total	1,254	100	—
Registered voters/turnout	3,345	37.49%	—
Source: (in Croatian)

=== Municipal Mayor ===
Two candidates competed for a position of municipal mayor of Borovo at 2025 Croatian local elections. Zoran Baćanović of the Independent Democratic Serb Party won the elections with 875 votes while Stojan Poznanović of Democratic Alliance of Serbs got 327 votes. Turnout at the election was 37.58%.

=== Minority Councils ===
Directly elected national minority councils and representatives serve as advisory bodies to local and regional authorities in Croatia. At the national level, local and regional councils often form coordination bodies. Councils and representatives are elected in units of local or regional self-government where national minorities meet the legally prescribed conditions and where candidates or electoral lists are submitted. They act on behalf of specific national minority communities (for example, Serb or Hungarian national minority councils), contributing to the protection and promotion of minority rights, encouraging participation in public life, and taking part in local decision-making processes, particularly in areas such as culture, education, language use, and media.

At the 2023 elections for national minority councils and representatives in Croatia, the Serb national minority met the legal requirements to elect a ten-member minority council in Borovo Municipality.

== Economy ==
Borovo is an underdeveloped municipality and is officially classified by the Government of Croatia as a First Category among the Areas of Special State Concern. The combined effects of the Croatian War of Independence and the transition from a socialist economic system to a market economy resulted in extensive deindustrialisation within the municipality. As a result, a large portion of the population shifted toward agricultural work, while a smaller number of residents established small private businesses.

== Education ==
=== Elementary education ===
Formal public elementary education in Borovo dates back to 1853, when the first elementary school was established in the village. In 1936, a new school building was officially opened under the name State Folk School of Knight King Alexander I the Unifier. At the time of its opening, it was the largest school in the Vukovar area. Following the Second World War, the institution was renamed Božidar Maslarić Elementary School. After the peaceful reintegration of Eastern Slavonia under the Erdut Agreement, the school was renamed again in 1997 and has since operated under the name Borovo Elementary School. In 2006, the building underwent comprehensive renovation financed by the European Union and the Government of Croatia.

== Culture ==
=== Points of Interest ===
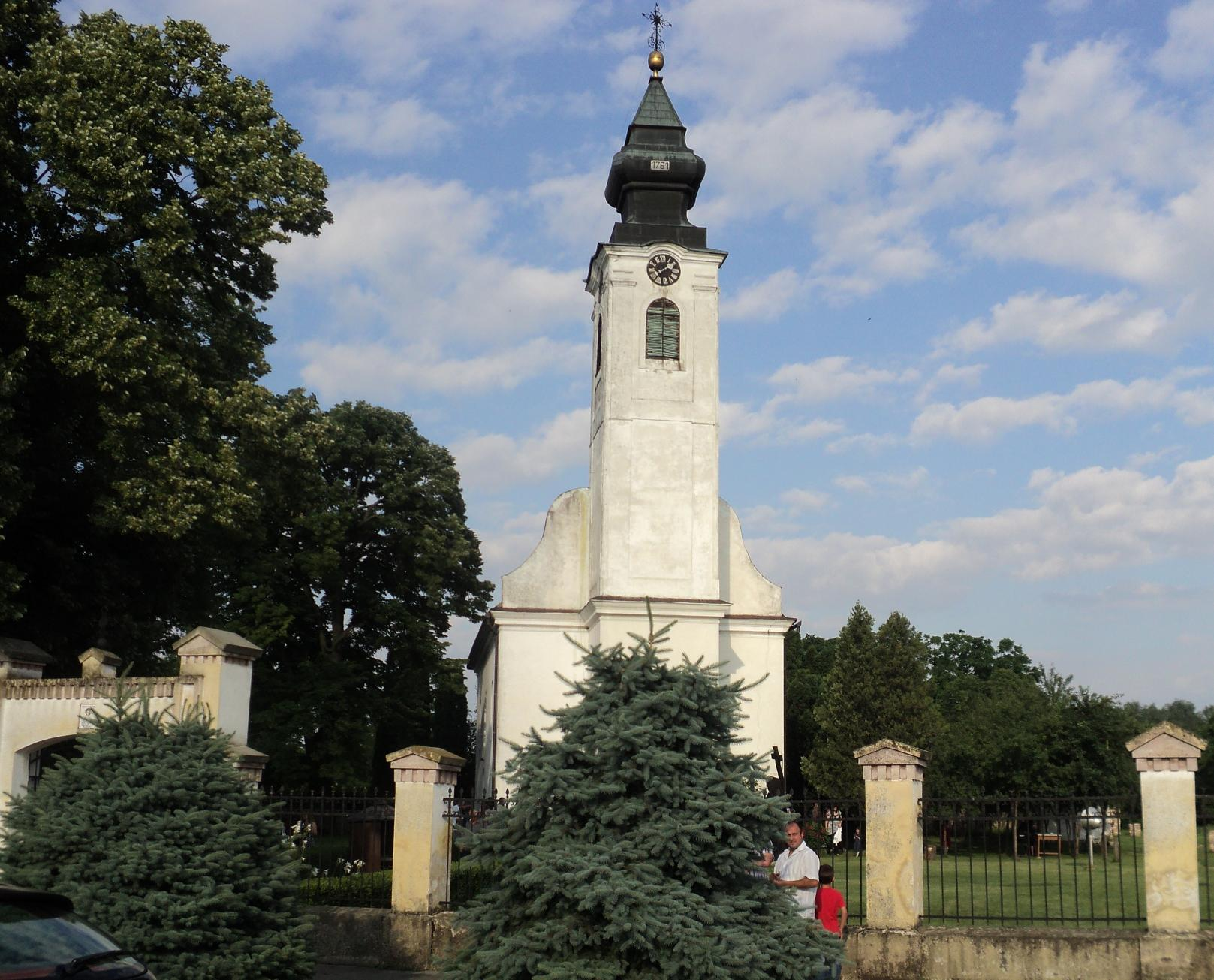
Serbian Orthodox Church of St. Stephen in Borovo

Serbian Orthodox Church of St. Stephen in Borovo was completed in 1764. Church is listed in Register of Cultural Goods of Croatia. Iconostasis with 49 icons and other inventory is also specifically listed in Register.

== Associations and Institutions ==
Borovo volunteer fire department is one of the oldest civil society organizations in the village. The fire department was established in 1932.

"Branislav Nušić" Cultural and Artistic Society, established in 1951 and reinitiated in 1996, has four sections: folklore, art, drama recitation and tamburitza with about 200 active members.

Contemporary Association of Antifascist Fighters of the People's Liberation War and Antifascists was established in 2000. With some 100 members in Borovo, association cooperates with the national umbrella Alliance of Anti-Fascist Fighters of Croatia. Prior to 1991 local World War II veterans were active in the Association of Fighters of the People's Liberation War of Yugoslavia.

Association of Serbs of Ozren and Posavina was established in 2009 bringing together post-World War II settlers who moved to the village from 1953 onwards. Association collaborate with partner organizations from Petrovo, Derventa, Bosanski Brod and other locations in Republika Srpska and the rest of Bosnia and Herzegovina.

Local pensioners association is a 320 members strong branch of the Zapadni Srem (Western Syrmia) Pensioners Association based in Vukovar. Plavi Dunav (Blue Danube) Association, established in 2007, is focused on preservation of nature, traditions, customs and development of local tourism while the Association of Beekeepers "Milena", established in 1998, brings together 40 members who collectively own approximately 450 beehives.

One of the three Serbian radio stations in the region, Radio Borovo, was formed in 1991 and was formally registered in accordance with Croatian laws following the end of war and the UNTAES mission in the region.

== Sport ==
Fudbalski klub Sloga is a football club established in 1926. In that year, group of sailors from a Czech boat on Danube broth the first ball in the village and the first football match was played by sailors and a group of locals. The local club was established shortly after. In 1947 match with Špart from Beli Manastir took place on a day of annual local celebration and fair. In the summer of 1950 Sloga's guest was FK Partizan. Partizan won the match with the result 10-0. On a return match at the Partizan Stadium result was 3:1 for Partisan. Two years after Partizan, Red Star Belgrade was Sloga's guest as well. Sloga lost the match with the result 8:1. Jovica Sremac Punoš was a club's player that played in Serbian First League in 1939/1940 season, just before World War II. Nikola Perlić was one of the Sloga's players. In 2016 90th anniversary of the club was organized with FK Vojvodina coming as a guest team for a friendly match. General Consul of Serbia in Vukovar Nataša Kelezić, Milorad Pupovac, Mile Horvat, Vojislav Stanimirović and Dragan Crnogorac attended the match. Vojvodina won the match with the result 6:0. In 2016 club was competing in the Second County League of Vukovar-Srijem County and in Joint Council of Municipalities Veteran Football League.

== Notable natives and residents ==
- Ratomir Dujković
- Nikola Perlić
- Vukašin Šoškoćanin

== Twin municipalities – Sister municipalities ==
- Medina, Hungary
- Petrovo, Bosnia and Herzegovina
- Šamac, Bosnia and Herzegovina
- Žitište, Serbia
- Teslić, Bosnia and Herzegovina

=== Other forms of cooperation ===
- Negoslavci, Croatia
- Temerin, Serbia
- Titel, Serbia
- Žabalj, Serbia

== See also ==
- Battle of Borovo Selo
- Borovo Naselje
- Serbs of Vukovar
- Radio Borovo
- Joint Council of Municipalities

== Sources ==
- Filipović, Vladimir (2022). "Srpska pobuna u selima vukovarske općine 1990. - 1991" [Serb Rebelion in the Villages of Vukovar Municipality 1990. - 1991.]. Scrinia Slavonica (in Croatian). 22 (1). Department for the History of Slavonia, Srijem and Baranja of the Croatian Institute of History: 291–319. doi:10.22586/ss.22.1.9 – via Hrčak.
- Cvek, Sven; Račić, Jasna; Ivčić, Snježana (2019). BOROVO U ŠTRAJKU: rad u tranziciji 1987. - 1991 (PDF). Zagreb: Rosa Luxemburg Foundation. ISBN 978-953-58721-3-9.
