= Church of St. Stephen, Borovo =

Serbian Orthodox church in Borovo, Croatia

Church of St. Stephen
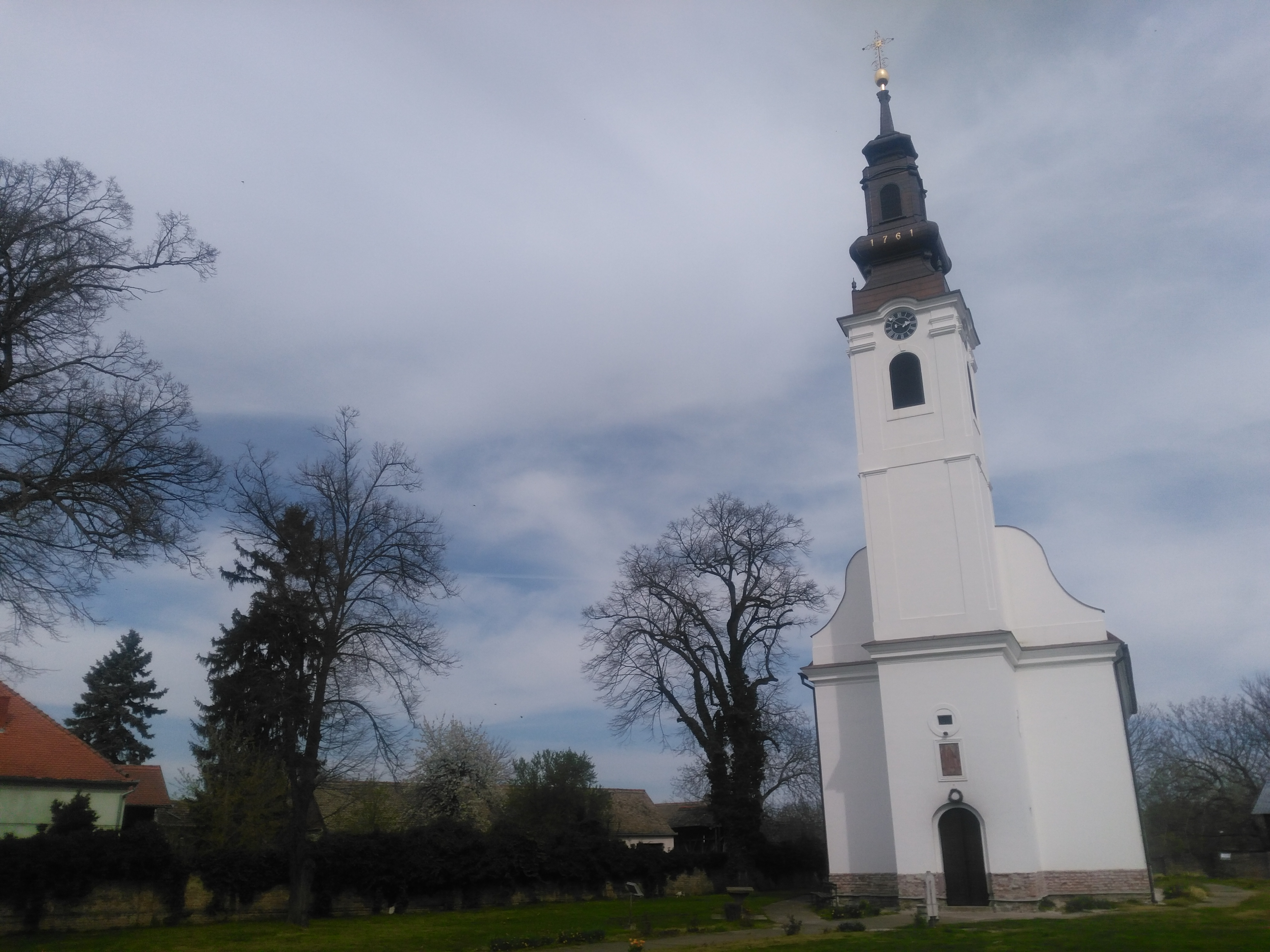
- Church of St. Stephen
- 45°24′11.5″N 18°58′53″E
- Location: Trg palih boraca 14; 32 227 Borovo; Vukovar-Syrmia County
- Country: Croatia
- Denomination: Serbian Orthodox

History
- Dedication: St. Stephen

Architecture
- Style: Baroque and Classicism
- Years built: 1761-1764

Administration
- Archdiocese: Eparchy of Osijek Plain and Baranya

The Church of St. Stephen (Croatian: Crkva svetog Stefana, Serbian Cyrillic: Црква светог Стефана) in Borovo is a Serbian Orthodox church in eastern Croatia. The church was built in the period from 1761 to 1764. First educational activities in the village were carried out under its patronage. Church is listed in Register of Cultural Goods of Croatia. Iconostasis with 49 icons and other inventory is also specifically listed in Register.

== See also ==
- List of Serbian Orthodox churches in Croatia
- Eparchy of Osijek Plain and Baranya
- Serbs of Croatia
