= Church of St. Nicholas, Vukovar =

Serbian Orthodox church in Vukovar, Croatia

Church of St. Nicholas
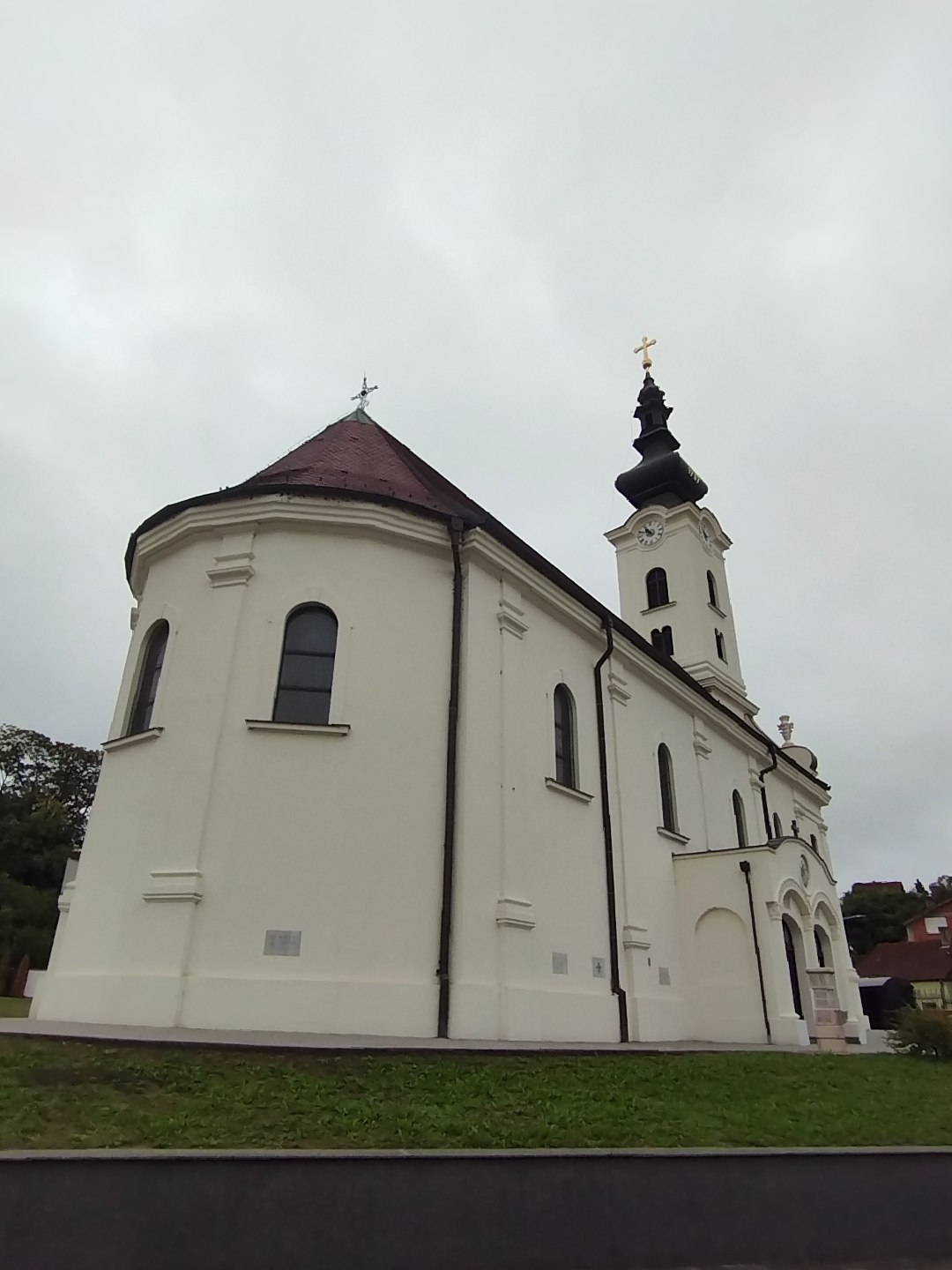
- Church of St. Nicholas
- 45°20′55″N 19°00′8″E
- Location: Vukovar, Vukovar-Syrmia County
- Country: Croatia
- Denomination: Serbian Orthodox Church

History
- Status: Church
- Dedication: Saint Nicholas

Architecture
- Functional status: Active
- Heritage designation: Register of Cultural Goods of Croatia
- Style: Baroque

Administration
- Archdiocese: Eparchy of Osijek Plain and Baranya

Church of St. Nicholas (Serbian: Црква светог Николе; Croatian: Crkva svetog Nikole) is a Serbian Orthodox church in Vukovar, Croatia. The church is one of the oldest baroque buildings of the Serb community north of the Sava River.

== Architecture ==
St. Nicholas is nave building with an apse and bell tower at the main facade. The main front in the central part is slightly accentuated, processed by single and doubled pilasters, cornices and attic wavy line on the edges of a classicist vases. Slender tower that emphasize edge pilasters ending baroque arches with the lantern. Vaulted nave of the church is divided into four bays, which are separated by a wide archivolts resting on Ionic capitals, while the semi-dome-vaulted sanctuary. The bell tower, which was completed in 1767, is 37 meters high.

== History ==
Present church was built in the period from 1733 till 1737. The church is built on location of old wooden church from 1690. The church was closed and looted during the World War II (1941-1942), and in 1991 interior of the church was dynamited by the local Croatian armed units in the city. Of the total 1991 pre-war internal inventory there is kept only 39 icons, 3 gospels and part of archive and church vessels. Reconstruction of external damage is completed, while the restoration of the interior is still in progress.

== Inventory ==
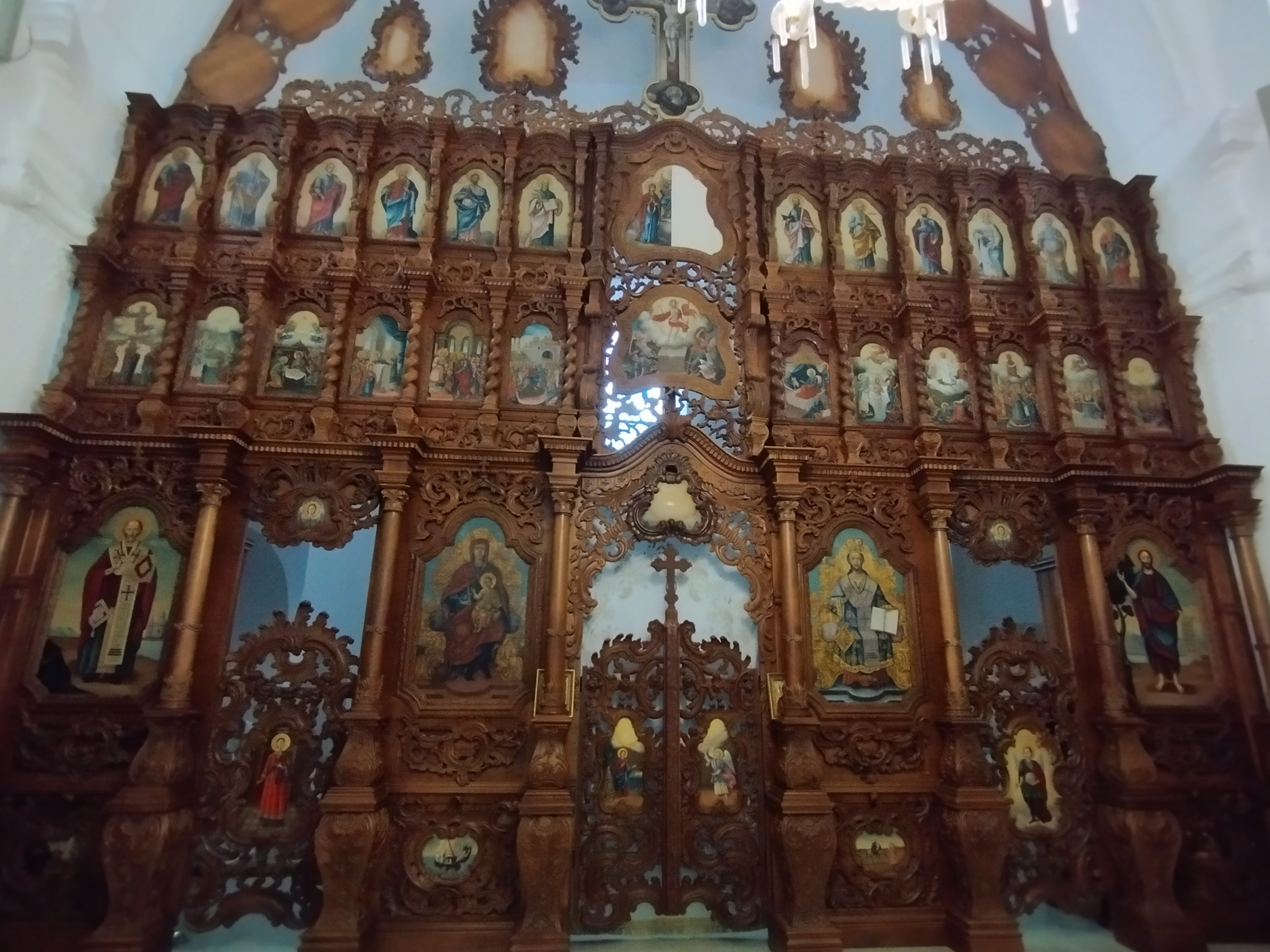
Baroque iconostasis.

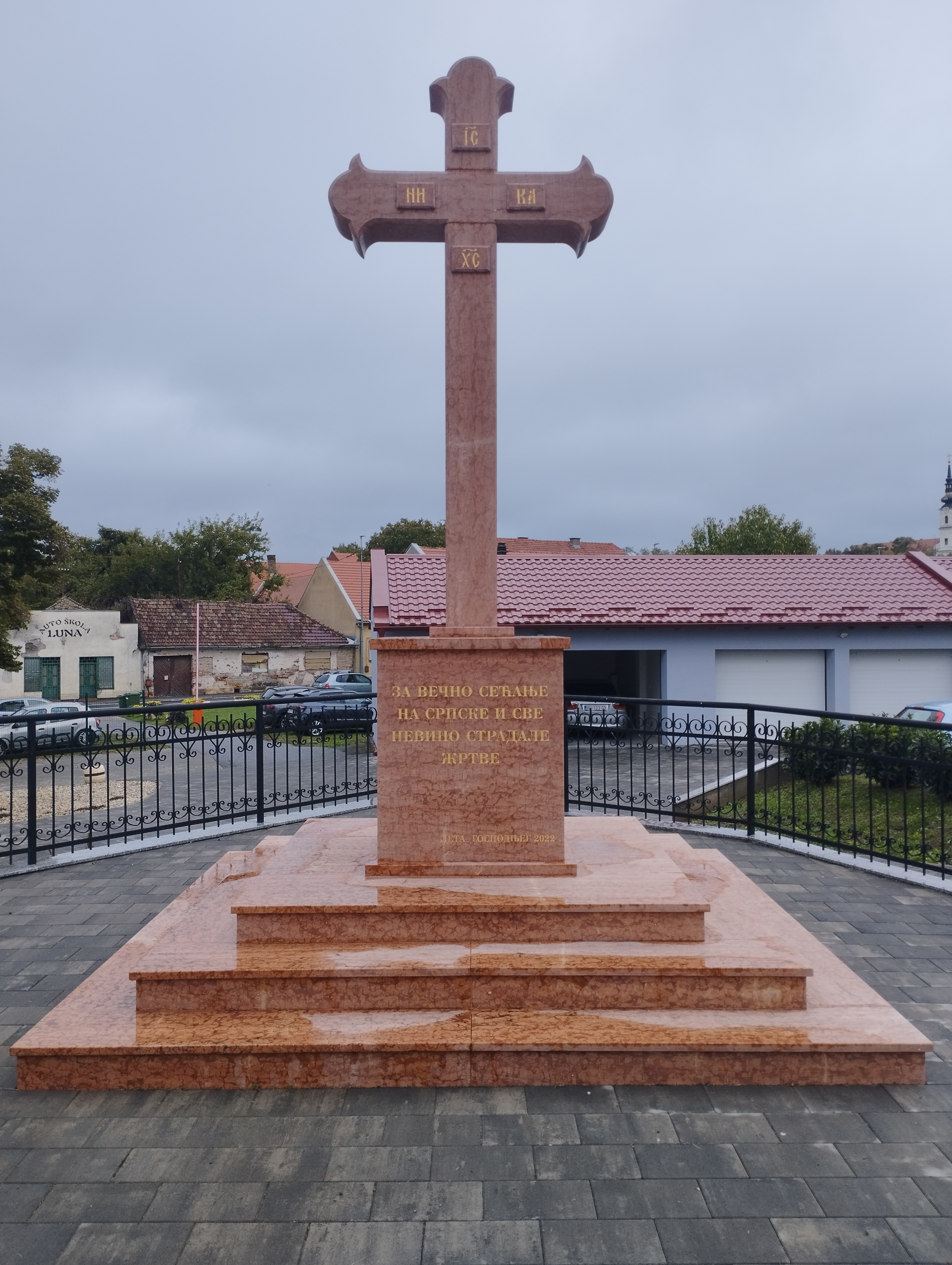
Orthodox memorial cross for the Serb victims of the war in Vukovar

St Nicholas inventory along church itself, is stated separately in Register of Cultural Goods of Croatia as a collection protected cultural property. Collection is composed of Baroque iconostasis from 1757, 17 icons from 1760, 23 books printed in Moscow in the 16th, 17th and 18th centuries - two of which are valuable octoechos from 1537, liturgical vessels, two choirs, the bishop's and the Virgin thrones, pews from the 18th century and table for communion.

== Serb House ==
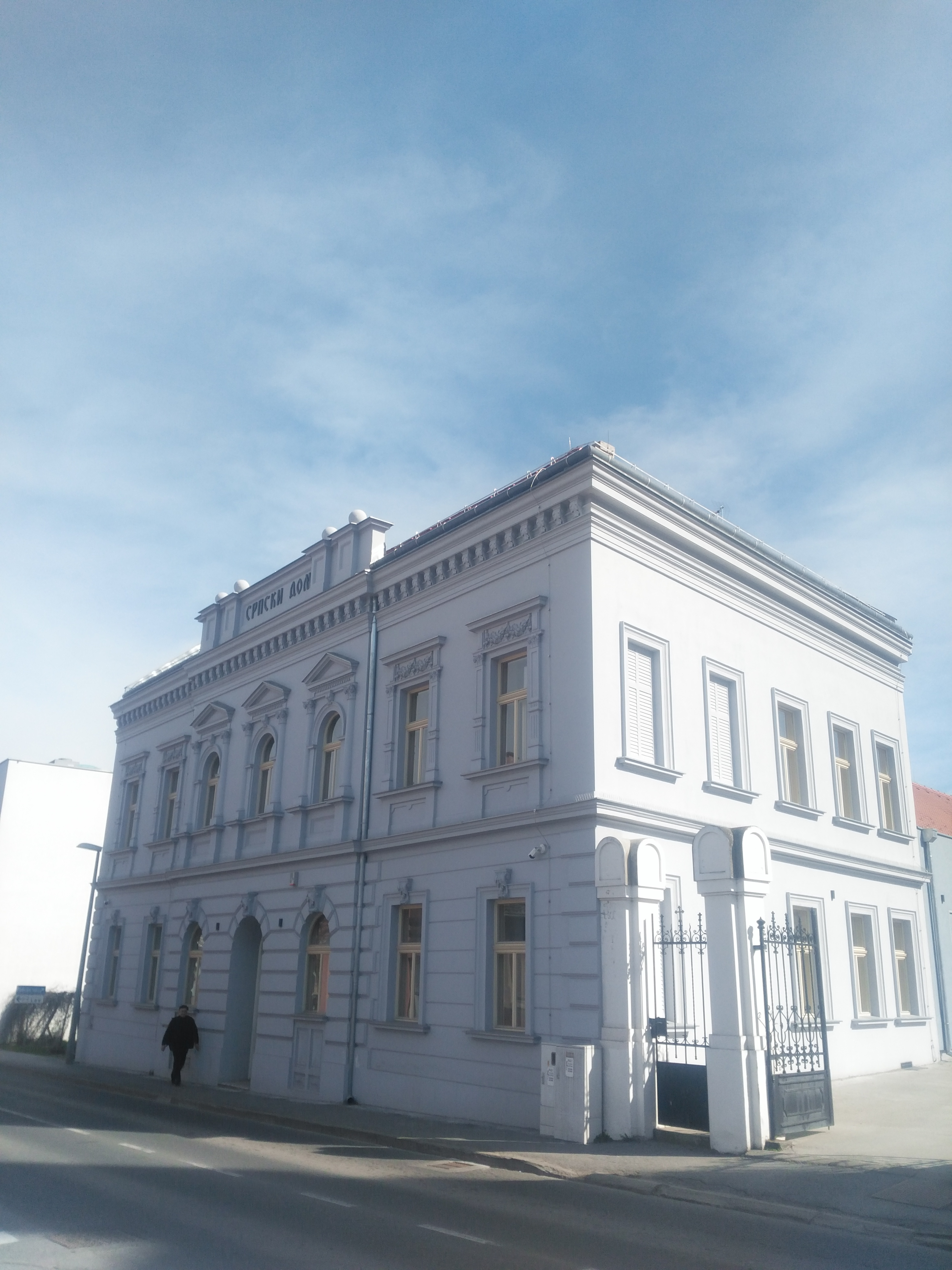
Serb House

The original Serb House (Serbian: Српски дом, romanized: Srpski dom) building in Vukovar was built in 1733. for the needs of the Serbian Russo-Slavic School. The original building was destroyed in a fire in 1822 in which 300 buildings in Vukovar burned.

The building was also seat of Serbian Singing Society "Javor". During World War II, the church was taken over by Nazis and Ustaše who established at as a Town Command Center. They changed building name into Adolf Hitler Home and destroyed the Serbian Cyrillic inscription Српски дом at the top of building. In the former Yugoslavia, the building belonged to Velepromet company and today it is subject to an ownership dispute between the town and Serbian Orthodox Church.

== See also ==
- List of Serbian Orthodox churches in Croatia
- Eparchy of Osijek Plain and Baranya
- Serbs of Vukovar
- Serbs of Croatia
