= Radio Borovo =

Serbian-language radio station in Croatia

Radio Borovo Радио Борово
- Radio Borovo official logo

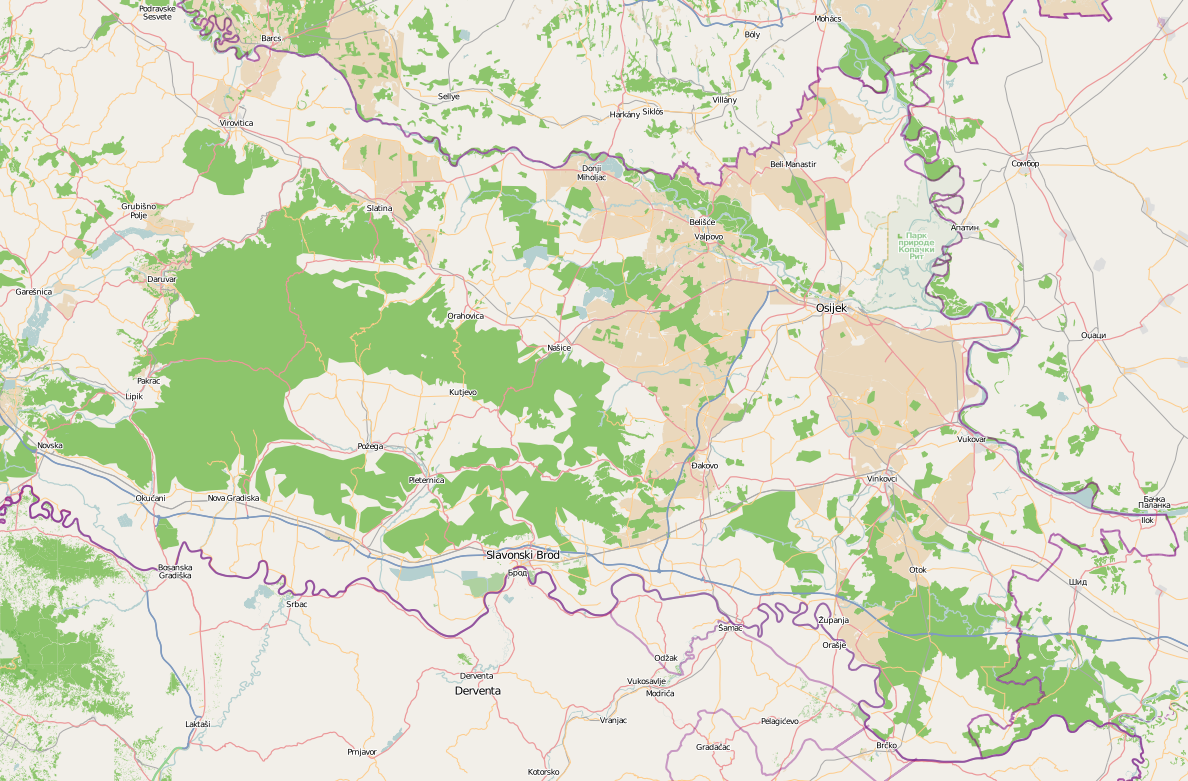
- Radio Borovo Broadcast Region
- Formation: 30 June 1991
- Type: Municipality of Borovo (25%)[1] Employees (75%)
- Location: Borovo, Croatia
- Official language: Serbian
- Director: Dragana Bošnjak
- Staff: 7
- Website: www.radio-borovo.hr

Radio Borovo (Serbian: Радио Борово) is a Serbian language-radio station serving primarily Serb ethnic minority in eastern Croatia. It has a local broadcasting license for the municipality of Borovo, Croatia. Its frequency is 100.7 MHz FM and it is heard in Vukovar-Srijem and Osijek-Baranja County and in Vojvodina in neighboring Serbia. Radio Borovo is an independent radio station, privately owned, registered as a limited liability company - "Rhapsody", with 75% of initial capital owned by employees, and 25% owned by the municipality of Borovo. It is the most popular ethnic minority radio station in Croatia. Due to its promotion of human and minority rights, it often collaborates with the non-governmental sector.

== History ==
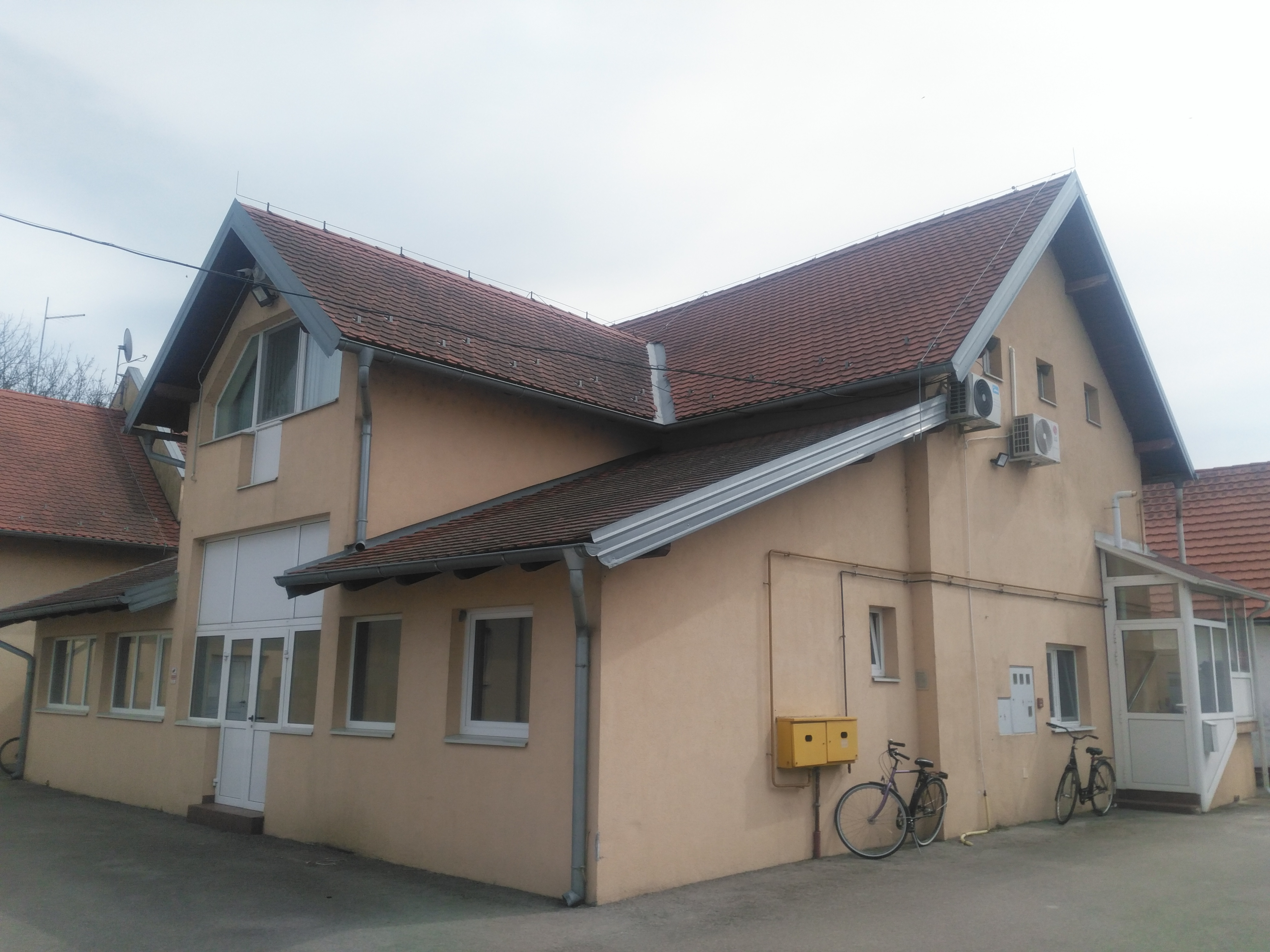
Radio Borovo building

Radio Borovo was established in 1991 in the initial stage of the Croatian War of Independence. During the period of the United Nations Transitional Administration for Eastern Slavonia, Baranja and Western Sirmium, Radio Borovo played prominent role in the provision of relevant daily information to the local Serb community in the area of the Serb parallel entity of Eastern Slavonia, Baranja and Western Syrmia. During this period it provided information on regulation of legal issues of the individual members of the community and promoted reconciliation. At that time it was formally registered in accordance with Croatian laws. In 2016, the president of the Serb National Council of the Borovo Municipality, Dušan Latas, expressed his ambition that Radio Borovo will one day be transformed into Serbian language redaction of the Croatian Radiotelevision.

== See also ==
- List of radio stations in Croatia
