= Consulate General of Serbia, Vukovar =

Consulate General of Serbia in Vukovar
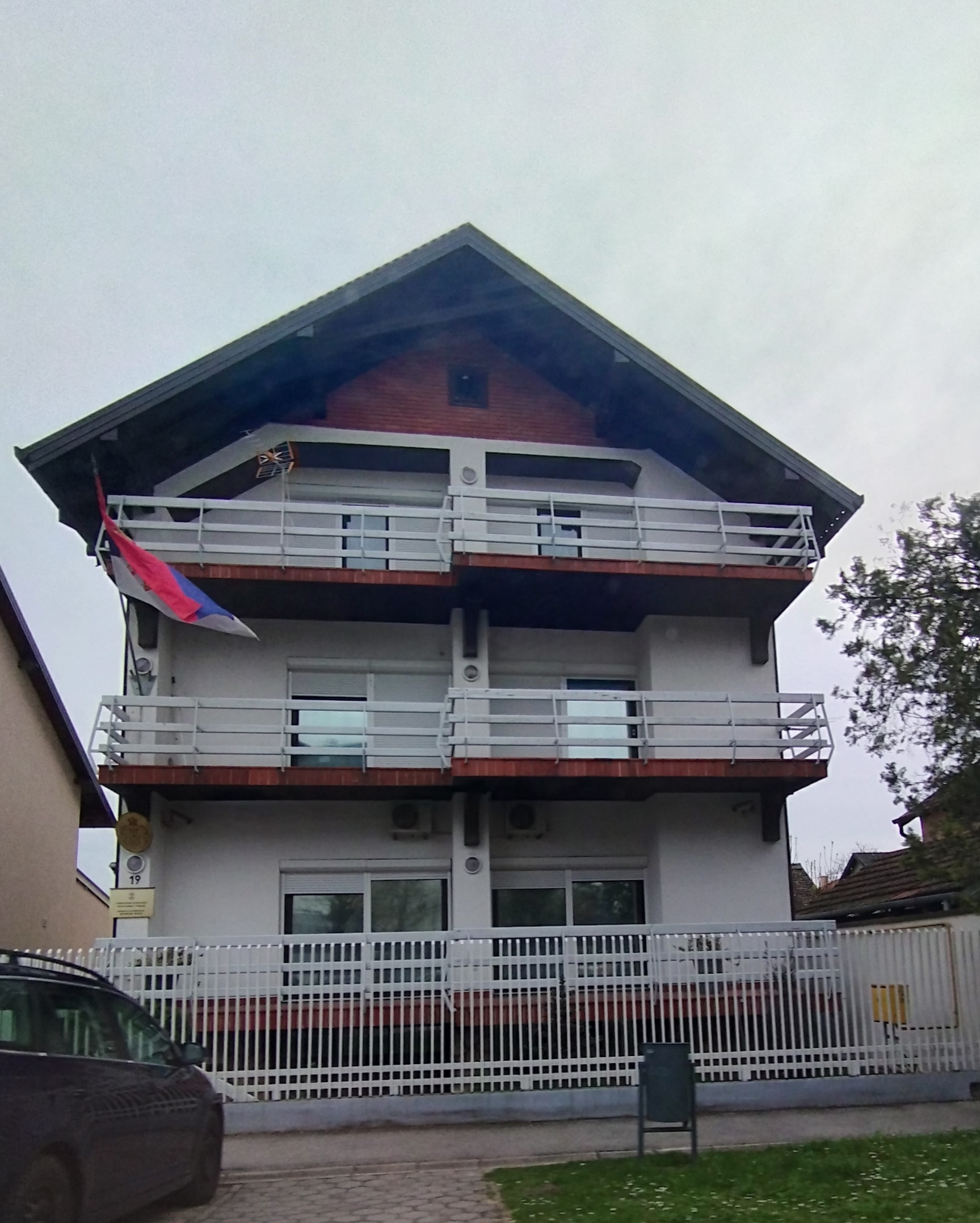
- Location: Vukovar, Croatia
- Address: Ivana Gundulića 19
- Coordinates: 45°21′26″N 18°59′32″E
- Jurisdiction: consular services in 5 counties in Slavonia
- Consul General: Vladimir Marjanović
- Website: vukovar.mfa.gov.rs/lat

The Consulate General of the Republic of Serbia in Vukovar (Serbo-Croatian: Генерални конзулат Републике Србије у Вуковару, Generalni konzulat Republike Srbije u Vukovaru) is the diplomatic mission of Serbia in Vukovar, Croatia. The consulate was opened in 1998 and today is one of two Serbian consulates in Croatia alongside the one in Rijeka. The consulate was opened in eastern Croatian Podunavlje region in the context of completion of the UNTAES administration which peacefully reintegrated short-lived Serb parallel entity of Eastern Slavonia, Baranja and Western Syrmia to the central government control. Today, the mission provides consular services for the area of Vukovar-Syrmia, Osijek-Baranja, Požega-Slavonia, Brod-Posavina and Virovitica-Podravina County.

== History ==
Multi-ethnic region of eastern Slavonia was one of the hotspots of the Croatian War of Independence with the Battle of Vukovar turning the town into a symbol of the war in the country. By 1995, it was clear the self-proclaimed Republic of Serbian Krajina could not sustain its secession, and following Croatian military offensives, most of the region was reintegrated except for Eastern Slavonia, Baranja and Western Syrmia. Local Serb leadership abandoned separatist aims after the signing of the Erdut Agreement. Belgrade, while stepping back from direct support, continued to express concern for the local Serb population until late 1995. Federal Republic of Yugoslavia and Croatia established diplomatic relations on September 9, 1996, following mutual recognition after the end of the war opening the opportunity for the exchanges of embassies and consulates.

The Consulate General of the Republic of Serbia was opened in 1998 in a building in the centre of Vukovar constructed in 1993 without a building permit in the aftermath of the 1991 Battle of Vukovar when the town was still a part of the self-proclaimed Republic of Serbian Krajina. The consulate remained in the same building until 2014 when it was sold to the Town of Vukovar to host the local Music School. Croatian Democratic Union, a major conservative centre-right political party in Croatia, expressed shock over the town’s decision to purchase an illegally constructed building built without permits during the existence of the Republic of Serbian Krajina.

The consulate moved to the new larger house in Ivana Gundulića street that belonged to Aleksandar Stanimirović, son of prominent local Serb politician Vojislav Stanimirović. Aleksandar Stanimirović exchanged the house in Vukovar (valued at €353,152.16 by court experts) for an apartment in Belgrade (estimated at 43,136,270 Serbian dinar). The relocation of the consulate was timed to take place one day before the Serbian Statehood Day.

In 2024 representatives of the Association of Women of Vukovar organized solidarity protests with 2024–present Serbian anti-corruption protests.

== See also ==
- Croatia–Serbia relations
- List of diplomatic missions in Croatia
- Croatia–Serbia border dispute
- Serbs of Vukovar
- Anti-Cyrillic protests in Croatia
