= Serbian language in Croatia =

Minority language in Croatia

The Serbian language is one of the officially recognized minority languages in Croatia. It is primarily used by the Serbs of Croatia. The Croatian Constitution, Croatian Constitutional law on national minorities rights, Law on Education in Language and Script of National Minorities and Law on Use of Languages and Scripts of National Minorities define the public co-official usage of Serbian in Croatia. Serbian and Croatian are two standardized varieties of the pluricentric Serbo-Croatian language. The majority of Serbs of Croatia use Ijekavian pronunciation of Proto-Slavic vowel jat except in the Podunavlje region in Vukovar-Syrmia and Osijek-Baranja Counties where local Serb population use Ekavian pronunciation. Post-World War II and Croatian War of Independence settlers in Podunavlje which have come from Bosnia, Dalmatia or Western Slavonia either use their original Ijekavian pronunciation, adopted Ekavian pronunciation or both of them depending on context. According to data from the 2021 census, almost two-thirds of Serbs of Croatia declared Croatian standardized variety as their first language with Ijekavian pronunciation always being required standard form in Croatian. While Serbian variety recognizes both pronunciations as standard, Ekavian is the more common one as it is the dominant one in Serbia, with Ijekavian being dominant in Bosnia-Herzegovina, Montenegro, and Croatia.

== History ==
The Orthodox liturgical book Varaždin Apostol from 1454 represents the oldest preserved text in Cyrillic from the territory of today's Croatia. Croatian Constitutional law on ethnic minorities rights, one of only two constitutional laws in country, was adopted in 2002.

In 2015, the United Nations Human Rights Committee urged the Croatian government to ensure the right of minorities to use their language and script. The report noted the 2013 Anti-Cyrillic protests in Croatia and municipalities concerned. Serbian Foreign Minister Ivica Dačić said that his country welcomes the UN Human Rights Committee's report.

== Instruction in Serbian language ==
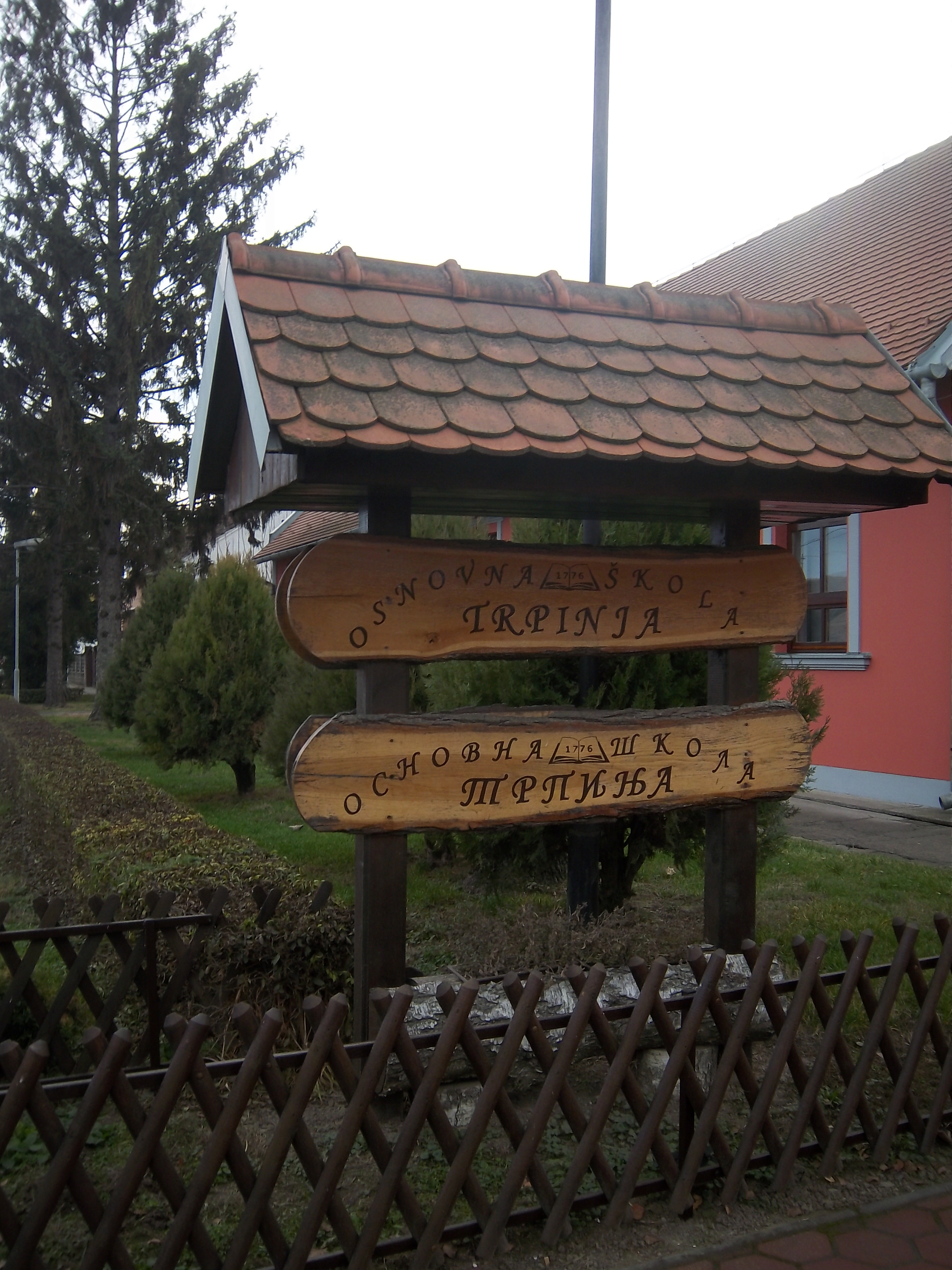
Plate in front of the school in Trpinja

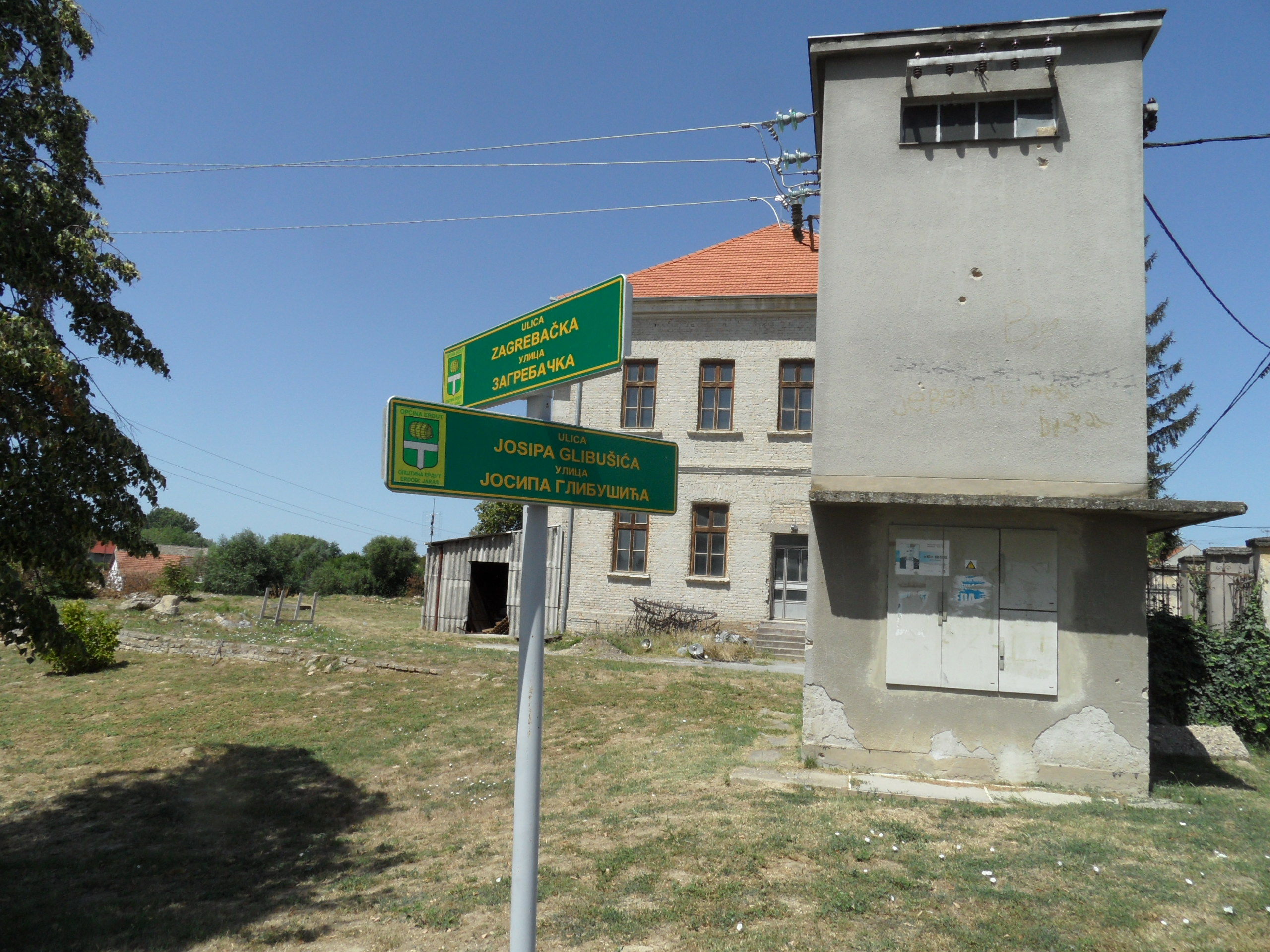
Street sign in Croatian and Serbian in Dalj, eastern Croatia

Most schools with instruction in Serbian are located in Vukovar-Srijem and Osijek-Baranja County in the area of former Eastern Slavonia, Baranja, and Western Syrmia where rights on education in minority languages were provided during the United Nations Transitional Administration for Eastern Slavonia, Baranja and Western Sirmium based on the Erdut Agreement. Along with those schools there is also Kantakuzina Katarina Branković Serbian Orthodox Secondary School in Zagreb.

In the school year 2010–2011, 3,742 students attended preschools, elementary, and secondary schools in Serbian. Some 59 educational institutions offered instruction in Serbian language that year and 561 instructors and teachers worked in them. In school year 2011–2012 the total number of students was 4,093 in 63 educational institutions and 563 educators and teachers worked in them. Number of classes or groups in this period increased from 322 to 353.

As a chair at the Department of South Slavic languages, Faculty of Humanities and Social Sciences at the University of Zagreb has the Chair of Serbian and Montenegrin literature.

== Other forms of cultural autonomy ==
Various minority organizations use Serbian in their work. One of them, Association for Serbian language and literature in Croatia from Vukovar is a nonprofit professional organization that brings together scientists and technical workers in the Republic of Croatia engaged in studying and teaching of Serbian language and literature.

== The co-official use at local government level ==
The Law on Use of Languages and Scripts of National Minorities provides for a mandatory co-official use of minority languages in municipalities of Croatia with at least one third of members of ethnic minority. Municipalities Dvor, Gvozd, Jagodnjak, Šodolovci, Borovo, Trpinja, Markušica, Negoslavci, Biskupija, Ervenik, Kistanje, Gračac, Udbina and Erdut, according to the provisions of law, are obliged to grant equal co-official use of Serbian language and Serbian Cyrillic alphabet. Donji Kukuruzari, Vrbovsko and most notably Vukovar were obliged to do so up until the 2021 census had shown that Serbs no longer made up at least one third of the population in these municipalities or towns. Law enforcement is facing great resistance in the part of the majority population, most notably in the case of Vukovar where it led to 2013 Anti-Cyrillic protests in Croatia.

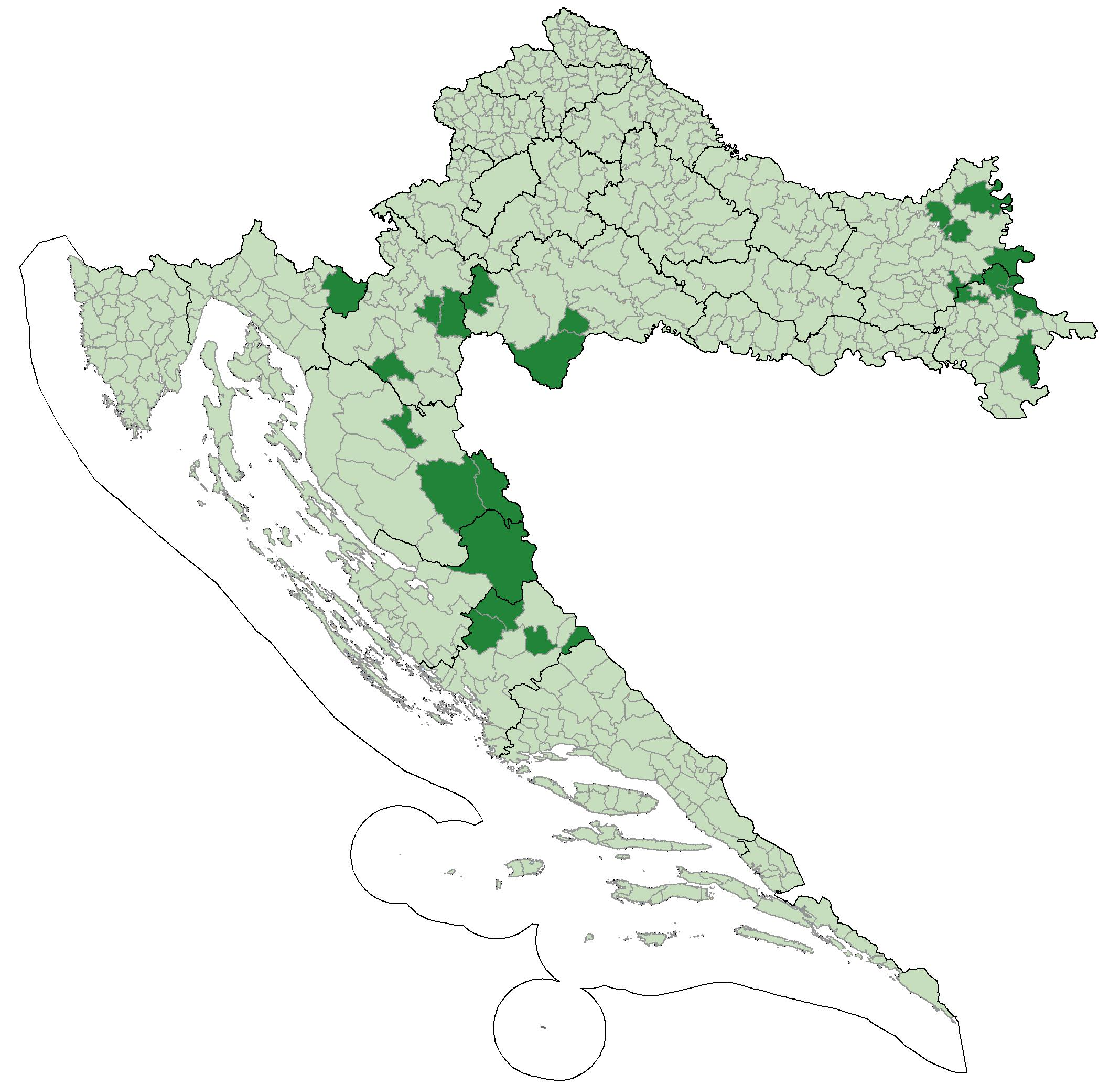
Municipalities with Serbian as minority language in official use

Formerly obliged to provide co-official use (less than 33.3% of the population per the 2021 census)

Municipality	Name in minority language	Affected settlements	Introduced based on	Population (2021)	Percentage of affected minority (2021)	County
Vrbovsko	Врбовско	All settlements	Constitutional Act	3,876	32.4%	Primorje-Gorski Kotar
Vukovar	Вуковар	All settlements	Constitutional Act	23,175	29.7%	Vukovar-Srijem
Biskupija	Бискупија	All settlements	Constitutional Act	1,177	81.9%	Šibenik-Knin
Borovo	Борово	All settlements	Constitutional Act	3,555	90.7%	Vukovar-Srijem
Civljane	Цивљане	All settlements	Constitutional Act	171	73.7%	Šibenik-Knin
Donji Kukuruzari	Доњи Кукурузари	All settlements	Constitutional Act	1,080	31.2%	Sisak-Moslavina
Dvor	Двор	All settlements	Constitutional Act	2,996	67.2%	Sisak-Moslavina
Erdut	Ердут	All settlements	Constitutional Act	5,436	53.7%	Osijek-Baranja
Ervenik	Ервеник	All settlements	Constitutional Act	789	96.9%	Šibenik-Knin
Gračac	Грачац	All settlements	Constitutional Act	3,136	43.3%	Zadar
Gvozd	Гвозд or Вргинмост	All settlements	Constitutional Act	2,047	62.6%	Sisak-Moslavina
Jagodnjak	Јагодњак	All settlements	Constitutional Act	1,500	62.8%	Osijek-Baranja
Kistanje	Кистање	All settlements	Constitutional Act	2,650	51.9%	Šibenik-Knin
Krnjak	Крњак	All settlements	Constitutional Act	1,332	58%	Karlovac
Markušica	Маркушица	All settlements	Constitutional Act	1,773	90.2%	Vukovar-Srijem
Negoslavci	Негославци	All settlements	Constitutional Act	983	96.8%	Vukovar-Srijem
Plaški	Плашки	All settlements	Constitutional Act	1,650	39.7%	Karlovac
Šodolovci	Шодоловци	All settlements	Constitutional Act	1,217	78%	Osijek-Baranja
Trpinja	Трпиња	Village Ćelije excluded in municipality Statute	Constitutional Act	4,167	87.8%	Vukovar-Srijem
Udbina	Удбина	All settlements	Constitutional Act	1,334	42.6%	Lika-Senj
Vojnić	Војнић	All settlements	Constitutional Act	3,602	38.4%	Karlovac
Vrhovine	Врховине	All settlements	Constitutional Act	653	47.6%	Lika-Senj
Donji Lapac	Доњи Лапац	All settlements	Constitutional Act	1,366	79.2%	Lika-Senj
Kneževi Vinogradi	Кнежеви Виногради	Kneževi Vinogradi and Karanac	Municipality Statute	3,357	16.5%	Osijek-Baranja
Nijemci	Нијемци	Banovci and Vinkovački Banovci	Municipality Statute	3,526	8.1%	Vukovar-Srijem

== See also ==
- Minority languages of Croatia
- Law on Use of Languages and Scripts of National Minorities
- European Charter for Regional or Minority Languages
- Italian language in Croatia
- Serbo-Croatian language
- Anti-Cyrillic protests in Croatia
