= Anti-Cyrillic protests in Croatia =

2013 protests in Croatia

- Part of response to introduction of minority Serbian Cyrillic alphabet in co-official use in town of Vukovar
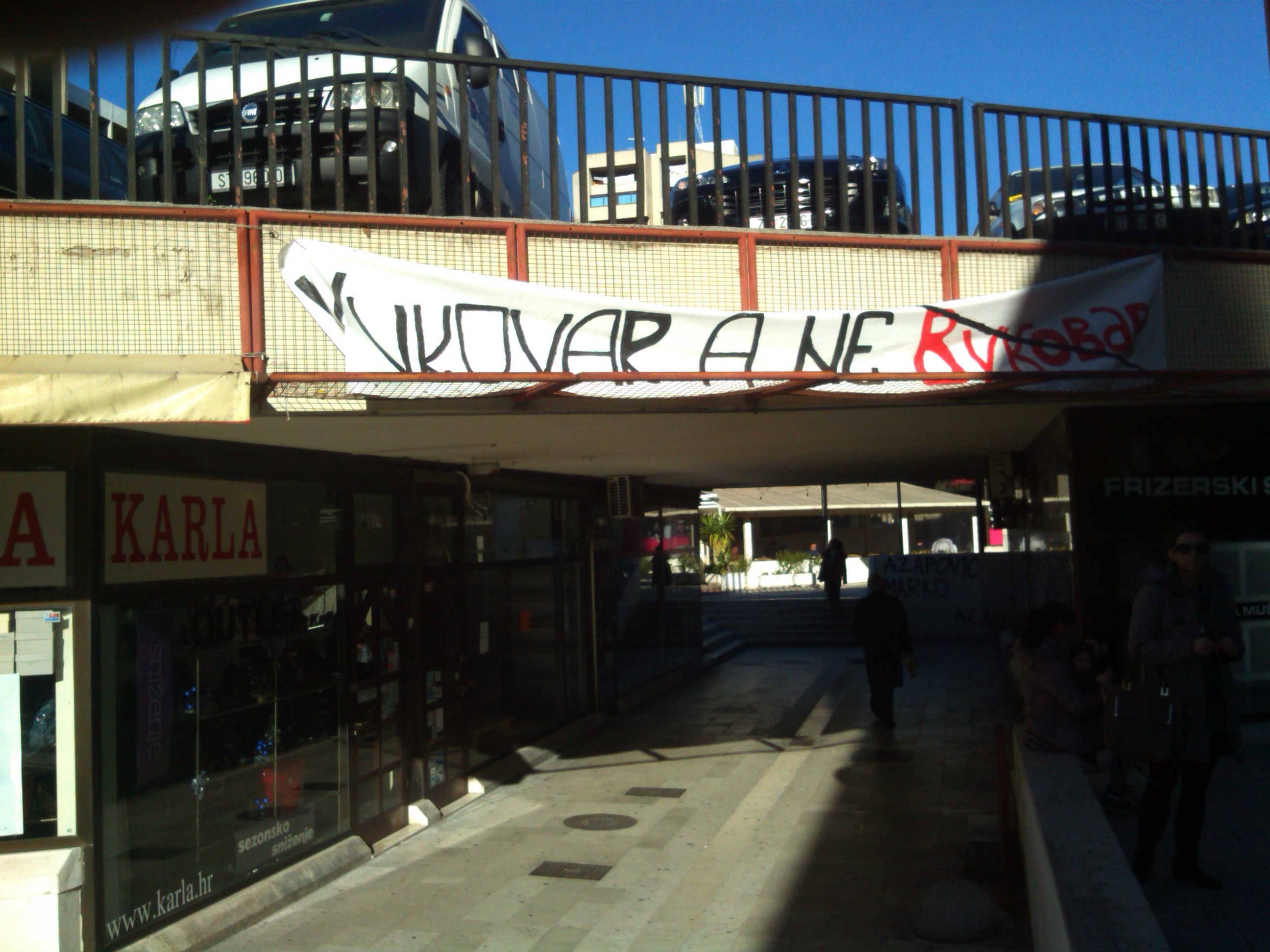
- A banner that says "Vukovar, not Вуковар" in Serbo-Croatian.
- Location: Vukovar; Zagreb; Tovarnik; Bogdanovci; Lovas; Nuštar
- Caused by: Start of application of bilingualism officially introduced in 2009 in town of Vukovar
- Goals: Opposition to usage of minority languages and seeking modification of Constitutional Law on National Minorities rights
- Methods: Vandalism, sabotage
- Status: Protests mostly ended; occasional ongoing minor vandalism in areas with Serbian population

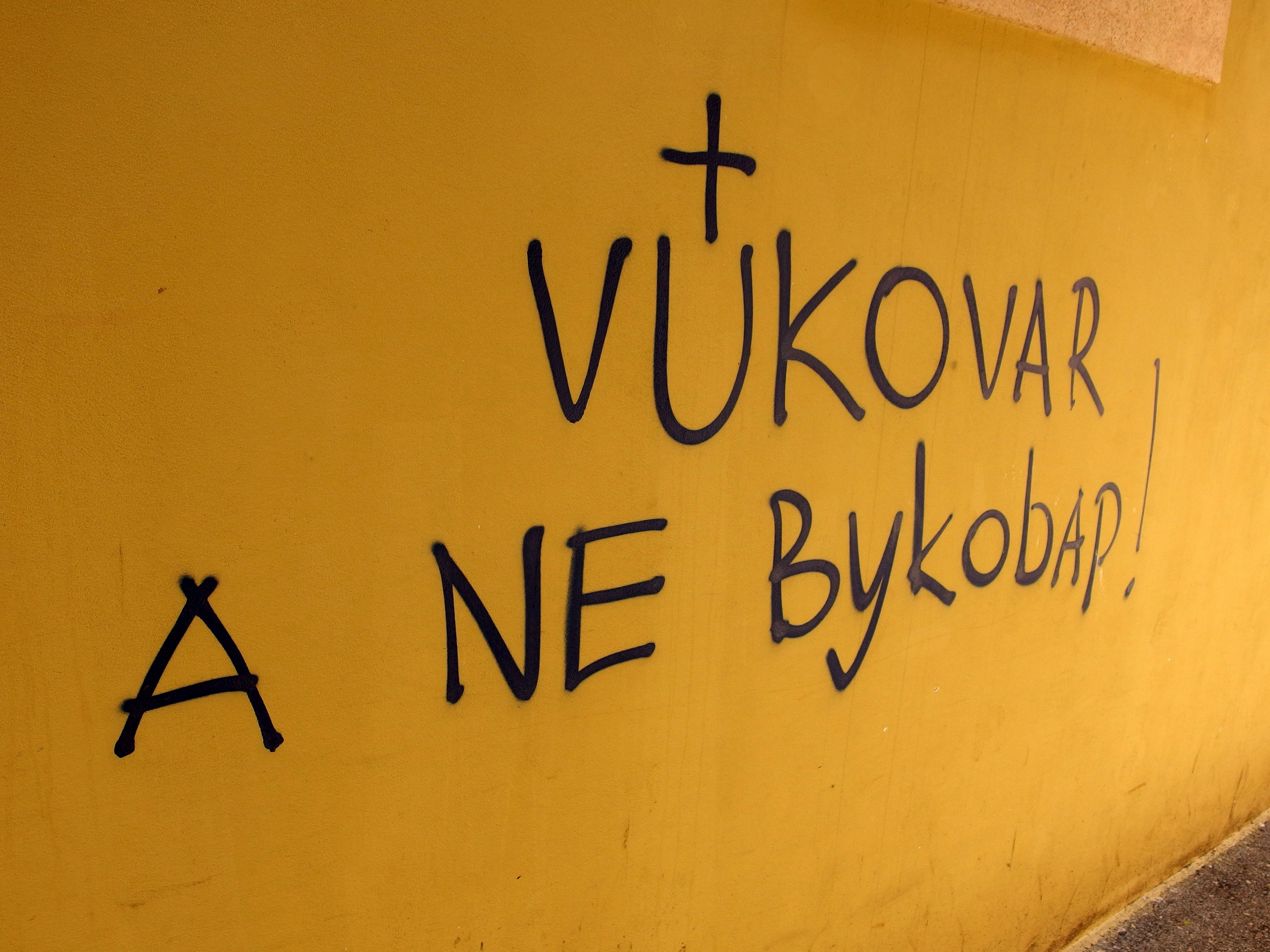
Anti-Cyrillic graffiti ("Vukovar and not Вуковар!") with the U symbol of the WWII fascist Ustashe

The anti-Cyrillic protests in Croatia were a series of protests in late 2013 against the application of bilingualism in Vukovar, whereby Serbian and the Serbian Cyrillic alphabet were assigned co-official status due to the local minority population. The implementation of this decision became mandatory after the 2011 Croatian census, according to which Serbs in Vukovar comprised more than one-third (34.8%) of Vukovar's total population. Signs in the Serbian Cyrillic alphabet had been put up as the Constitutional Act on the Rights of National Minorities mandates bilingual signs in any area where more than one-third of the population belongs to an ethnic minority. This decision became subject of intense agitation by, among others, Croatian war veterans and many ordinary citizens who believe that due to events, particularly the Battle of Vukovar, the city should have been excluded from the application of the law on minority rights, although protests and vandalism have occurred in other towns and cities (i.e. Split, Dubrovnik, etc). The Serbs of Croatia are a minority group that have the narrowest usage of right to bilingualism among all national minorities in Croatia.

A group called HQs for defense of Croatian Vukovar initiated protest rallies on 2 September, as soon as the placement of the signs written in both the Latin and the Cyrillic scripts began in Vukovar. With protests in Vukovar, in April 2013 there were also organized protests in Zagreb's main square with around 20,000 participants. Parallel protests were held in Tovarnik, Bogdanovci, Lovas, and Nuštar. A number of signs in the Serbian Cyrillic alphabet were torn down, others were smashed with hammers, and protesters clashed with the police, leaving four police officers slightly injured. Some of supporters not directly connected to the protesters organized actions of writing pro-fascist Ustaše graffiti on the Orthodox Church of the Holy Annunciation in Dubrovnik and in Zadar.

On 12 August 2014 the Constitutional Court of Croatia decided that referendum proposal on the restriction of the use of minority languages in such a way to increase the required proportion of total population to 50%, is unconstitutional. The City Council of Vukovar was required to regulate the use of minority languages in its statute within a year after the court decision. The Government of Croatia was required to define the legal mechanisms for cases when the representative bodies of local self-government do not implement the obligations under the Law regarding minority languages. National authorities competent for implementation of laws on minority languages were instructed not to implement the Law in the City of Vukovar by use of coercive measures until the government of Croatia fulfills its obligation.

In April 2015 the United Nations Human Rights Committee urged Croatia to ensure the right of minorities to use their language and alphabet. Committee report stated that particularly concerns the use of Serbian Cyrillic in the town of Vukovar and municipalities concerned. Serbian Foreign Minister Ivica Dačić said that his country welcomes the UN Human Rights Committee's report.

On 17 August 2015, under requirement of the Constitutional Court of Croatia, the City Council of Vukovar decided to amend the city statute in such a way as not to provide bilingual signs in Latin and Cyrillic scripts at official town buildings, institutions, squares and streets. The Council of Europe stated its regret about this decision. The decision was taken by MPs from Croatian Democratic Union and Croatian Democratic Alliance of Slavonia and Baranja while MPs from Social Democratic Party of Croatia, Independent Democratic Serb Party and Croatian People's Party – Liberal Democrats left the session at which the decision was taken. The Ministry of Public Administration announced that it would overturn the decision if it is established to be contrary to the constitution.

The local civic society The city, that's us too suggested that the dispute could be resolved by putting on the right side of the entrance to local government buildings a sign in Croatian Latin script, and on the left side a sign in the languages and scripts of ethnic minorities living in Vukovar.

== Reactions ==
=== Croatia ===
==== Opposition ====
- Croatian President Ivo Josipović joined in the condemnation of the events in Vukovar, saying that an added effort must be invested to prevent violence and tensions. "We have the law which goes toward full respect of the national minorities. All relevant political parties in Croatia took part in passing this law," Josipović said.
- Croatian Prime Minister Zoran Milanović condemned "chauvinist violence", saying it will not take down signs in Cyrillic in Vukovar as the "rule of law must prevail".
- Former Croatian President Stjepan Mesić claimed the protests in Zagreb were not ... a democratic expression of different opinions, but of intolerance... The appearance of people in military uniforms at such place ... clearly violate state law. If we consider publicly and unambiguously imposed threats that they will by using force prevent implementation of duties that every citizen and every institution is obligatory to do by Constitution, Sunday gathering at main square look like blow to the constitutional and legal order of our country.
- Vukovar mayor Željko Sabo, a veteran of the Yugoslav Wars, who had been imprisoned in Serbia, appealed for people to stay calm and "not let Vukovar become Beirut".
- Croatian foreign minister Vesna Pusić said that Croatians "must and can" obey Croatian laws and said that government must stand firm on the minorities legislation.
- Dragan Crnogorac, president of Joint Council of Municipalities, expressed concern and regret over events in Vukovar and rest of Croatia. He said that these events create a negative atmosphere directed towards the Serbian community and the Cyrillic alphabet. In this way, they undermines everything that has been achieved in previous years in building tolerance and cohabitation among Serbs and Croats.
- Bojan Glavašević, son of Croatian reporter Siniša Glavašević, killed by Serb paramilitaries after the Battle of Vukovar, said that use of his father's voice at the protest in Zagreb was inappropriate and that the name of his father was being used for political marketing. He said everyone has a right to peaceful protest, but condemned hate speech on the protests.
- 26 NGOs in Croatia sent a joint letter to Pope Francis, voicing concern about the stance of Croatian Cardinal Josip Bozanić and several bishops who publicly demonstrated their opposition to bilingualism in Vukovar. The NGOs highlighted that the bishops' statements do not contribute to peace and reconciliation, but rather lead to further deepening of conflicts.
- Archbishop of Đakovo-Osijek Đuro Hranić called for mutual respect and love.

==== Support ====
- The County Council of Vukovar-Srijem County gave support to protesters in their intent "to stop the violent introduction of bilingualism in Vukovar". During the vote Council members of Social Democratic Party of Croatia, Croatian Party of Pensioners and Independent Democratic Serb Party left the session.
- Representatives of Associations of Croat Returnees of Eastern Slavonia, Baranja and Western Syrmia gave its support to all the demands by the HQs for defense of Croatian Vukovar.

=== Former Yugoslavia ===
==== Serbia ====
- The Serbian Progressive Party condemned the protests, urging Zagreb to protect Serb minority rights.
- The Coalition of Serbian Refugees from Croatia, which represents many Serbs who fled Croatia at the end of the war in 1995, said the protests were another example of violations of minority rights in Croatia.

==== Slovenia ====
- Then-European Parliament Rapporteur for Serbia Jelko Kacin said that he expected a "clear response" from Zagreb.

=== International ===
==== European Union ====
- European Commission spokesperson Dennis Abbott said that European Union has no intention of interfering in the dispute over Cyrillic signs in Vukovar. He reminded the belligerents that respect for cultural diversity and minority rights is enshrined in fundamental documents of EU, but that jurisdiction in these matters are under every member state.

==== Council of Europe ====
- On 21 August 2015, Council of Europe, prompted by Vukovar City Council decision to amend the city statute in such a way as not to provide bilingual signs in Latin and Cyrillic scripts at official town buildings, institutions, squares and streets, stated that this institution strongly regrets the removal of signs in minority languages through vandalism or pursuant to formal decisions aiming at limiting the presence of minority languages in the public and urges all relevant public authorities in all States Parties to fully implement the provisions of the European Charter for Regional or Minority Languages.

== Chronology ==
=== 2019 ===
- 18 October Incident occurred at the city council of Vukovar when SDSS representative Srđan Kolar handed to Ivan Penava, mayor of Vukovar, city statute written in Serbian Cyrillic. Vukovar city council concluded: "We reached a level of understanding, solidarity and tolerance among members of the Croatian people and members of the Serb national minority at a level that facilitates co-operation and coexistence, but the conditions for extending the scope of secured individual rights have not been met". Only sign in Cyrillic left is on the entrance of Vukovar harbor.

=== 2018 ===
- 28 September Milorad Pupovac was attacked with a slice of lemon in Zagreb.

=== 2017 ===
- 20 November Two days after the memorial of the fall of Vukovar, Crvena Zvezda fans displayed the banner: "18.11.1991. Until the new liberation - Glory to all victims for Serbian Vukovar".

=== 2015 ===
- 21 August Council of Europe stated its regret about City Council decision.
- 17 August City Council of Vukovar decided to amend the city statute in such a way as not to provide bilingual signs in Latin and Cyrillic scripts.

=== 2014 ===
- 23 September: Members of the Headquarters for Defense of Croat Vukovar removed all bilingual signs in the city; 5 of them were later placed under arrest.
- 12 August: Constitutional Court of Croatia decision on non-constitutionality of HQs for defense of Croatian Vukovar referendum proposal
- 16 March: A Serbs of Croatia flag was stolen from municipal government building in Borovo.
- 14 March: Bilingual sign of State Administration Office in Vukovar was broken.
- 6 March: Bilingual sign of Croatian Employment Service in Vukovar was broken.
- 24 January: Member of the European Parliament of European Conservatives and Reformists group Ruža Tomašić stated that Serbs in Vukovar should not get anything since they are the ones who destroyed the town (sic) in collaboration with Yugoslav People's Army.
- 7 January: Unknown perpetrators destroyed a bilingual sign on Serb National Council building in Pula.
- 5 January: Six bilingual signs destroyed in Vukovar.
- 3 January: Patriarch Irinej of Serbia in Christmas letter stated that prosecution of Cyrillic is the same as persecuting Serbs.

=== 2013 ===
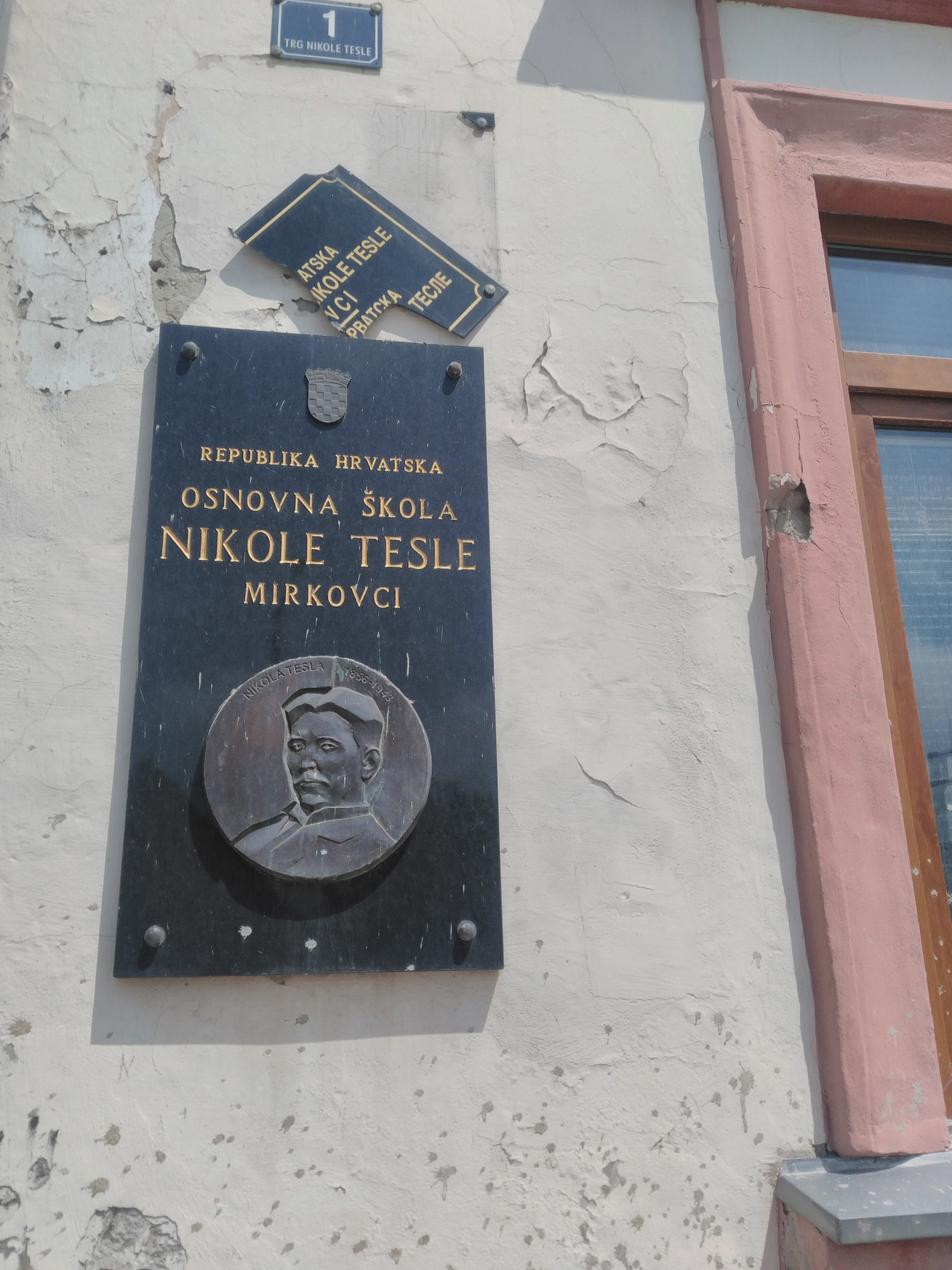
Broken bilingual sign of the Elementary School Nikola Tesla in Mirkovci

- 20 December: Destroyed bilingual signs in Vukovar and on Elementary School in Mirkovci.
- 16 December: HQs for defense of Croatian Vukovar submitted signatures for referendum.
- 13 December: Bilingual signs graffitied in Vukovar.
- 7 December: MP Milorad Pupovac received death threats.
- 2 December: Threatening messages sent to Director of Jasenovac concentration camp memorial area.
- 21 November: Ministry of Public Administration suspended provisions of town statutes that limits usage of minority language.
- 19 November: neo-Nazi salute ("Za dom") at the Croatia-Iceland football game.
- 19 November: FIFA delegate requested removal of banner Zapamtite Vukovar (English: Remember Vukovar) from Stadion Maksimir before the Croatia-Iceland football match.
- 19 November: Bilingual sign removed from the Trpinja municipality building; flag of Serbs of Croatia stolen.
- 18 November: State delegation led by Prime Minister Zoran Milanović and President Ivo Josipović blocked from participating in fall of Vukovar "memory walk" by HQs for defense of Croatian Vukovar.
- 18 November: President of Serb National Council Milorad Pupovac for the first time participated in "memory walk" which commemorates the Battle of Vukovar. The event was attended by Veljko Džakula, president of Serb Democratic Forum.
- 17 November: Bilingual signage stolen in Osijek for the third time.
- 17 November: HQs for defense of Croatian Vukovar began collecting signatures for referendum for limitation of rights on usage of minority languages.
- 12 November: Table on Serb National Council building in Osijek painted.
- 9 November: Two men (both 18 years old) damage a sign on the Consulate General of Serbia in Rijeka.
- 6 November: Graffiti ("Serbian family tree") with a picture of lynched people appeared on Ban Jelačić Square.
- 5 November: Bilingual memorial plaque for Macedonian writer Andrej Petkovic in Rijeka is damaged.
- 5 November: "Serbs out" graffiti written in Vukovar.
- 4 November: Minister of Veterans Predrag Matić stated in Večernji list that the Serbs of Croatia are not loyal to Croatia.
- 4 November: City Council adopted a new statute of Vukovar and prohibited usage of Cyrillic.
- 3 November: Bilingual sign of the Serb National Council building in Varaždin is damaged.
- 2 November: Bilingual sign removed from the Serb National Council building in Osijek for the second time.
- 25 October: Removed bilingual sign from Serb National Council building in Osijek.
- 22 October: Removed bilingual signs from Employment Service buildings in Vukovar.
- 19 October: Removed bilingual signs from State Administration buildings in Vukovar.
- 12 October: Removed bilingual sign from Vojnić municipality building.
- 12 October: Removed bilingual sign from Biskupija municipality building.
- 11 October: Three bilingual signs destroyed at the Udbina municipality building.
- 8 October: An unknown offender removed bilingual sign from Prosvjeta building in Zagreb. Five policemen were suspended for not intervened and one got fired for breaking the sign in Vukovar.
- 7 October: A group of Croatian war veterans removed bilingual signs from three buildings in Vukovar.
- 23 September: The president of the Coordination of Associations of Croat Returnees sprayed Cyrillic inscription on Pension insurance building in Vukovar.
- 16 September: An unknown offender removed bilingual sign from Krnjak municipality building.
- 12 September: Members of the HQs for Defense of Croatian Vukovar broke a bilingual sign at Vukovar's police station and clashed with the police. Darko Pajtić was fatally wounded by the policeman Saša Sabadoš, who was later convicted of his death.
- 13 September: Monument for Serb victims from war destroyed in Golubić.
- 6 September: During the football match between Serbia and Croatia Serbian fans displayed banner with "Vukovar" written in Cyrillic, burned the Croatian flag and shouted "Kill Ustashe", "Vukovar is ours" and "Serbia - Chetniks". They also chanted "Oy Ustashe deep river awaits you, slaughter the men, rape the women".
- 5 September: Local HQs for defense of Croatian Vukovar established in Slunj; around 100 protesters gathered in support of the removal of bilingual plaques in Vukovar. The mayor of Slunj distanced himself from them as unnecessary and serving the political ends of the organizer(s).
- 4 September: An explosive device thrown at the local Serb National Council building in Split.
- 4 September: Josip Leko, Speaker of the Croatian Parliament, stated there would not be an emergency session which had been requested by Croatian Democratic Alliance of Slavonia and Baranja.
- 3 September: The Croatian Democratic Alliance of Slavonia and Baranja requested an emergency session of Croatian Parliament over Vukovar events.
- 3 September: Graffiti ("Srbe na vrbe") scrawled on a wall of the Orthodox Church of the Holy Annunciation in Dubrovnik.
- 2 September: Bilingual signs broken in Vukovar. Several police officers were injured.
- 20 August: During the FIBA European Championship for Juniors game in Borovo naselje Serbian fans shouted "This is Serbia"and "Vukovar is the heart of Serbia" and displayed Serbian flag with "Vukovar" written in Cyrillic. Incidents continued after the game.

=== 2012 ===
- 24 May In an interview, President of Serbia, Tomislav Nikolić, was quoted by Frankfurter Allgemeine Zeitung to have said that ″Vukovar was a Serb city and Croats have nothing to go back to there″. Croatian President Ivo Josipović criticized Nikolić for this statement and conditioned future cooperation on Nikolić's withdrawal of the statement.

== Historical bans on usage of Cyrillic in Vukovar ==
In 1861 General Assembly of Syrmia County unanimously adopted decision on introduction of the Serbian Cyrillic alphabet as official alphabet on the territory of county. This decision was reversed eight years later in 1869 when the Parliament of Kingdom of Croatia-Slavonia adopted decision on exclusive usage of Gaj's Latin alphabet and repealed the county decision on usage of Cyrillic. This caused dissatisfaction among the Serbs of Vukovar who sent a letter of protest to Emperor Franz Joseph I of Austria since the Kingdom of Croatia-Slavonia was part of Austro-Hungarian Empire. Citizens of Vukovar asked the emperor to protect his subjects from the parliament's decision, pointing out that the decision was unreasonable, especially since even the Diet of Hungary of the Lands of the Crown of Saint Stephen accepted their letters in Cyrillic.

During World War II, the Serbian Cyrillic alphabet was banned throughout the Independent State of Croatia.

State sanctioned book burning was carried out by the Government of the Republic of Croatia between 1990 and 2010. Books that were written in Serbian Cyrillic were burned with an estimated 2.8 million books destroyed in this period.

On 5 November 2013, the Croatian Democratic Union and Croatian Party of Rights dr. Ante Starčević adopted amendments to the city's statutes, declaring Vukovar to be a "place of special reverence" of the Serbian destruction of the town during the Battle of Vukovar and prohibited usage of Serbian Cyrillic alphabet. Milorad Pupovac, president of Serb National Council, said he expects that the Croatian government or Constitutional Court of Croatia would annul this decision.

== See also ==
- Minority languages of Croatia
- Minority language
- European Charter for Regional or Minority Languages
- Croatian Constitutional law on national minorities rights
- Law on Use of Languages and Scripts of National Minorities
- Anti-Serb sentiment
- Far-right politics in Croatia
