= Jasna Omejec =

Croatian jurist (born 1962)

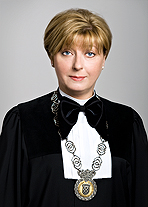

4th President of the Constitutional Court of Croatia
- In office 12 June 2008 – 7 June 2016
- Preceded by: Petar Klarić (as President); Željko Potočnjak (Interim)
- Succeeded by: Miroslav Šeparović

Justice of the Constitutional Court of Croatia
- In office 7 December 1999 – 7 June 2016

Personal details
- Born: 9 January 1962 (age 64) Osijek, SR Croatia, SFR Yugoslavia (modern Croatia)
- Party: Liberal Party (before 1999)
- Education: University of Osijek; University of Zagreb

Jasna Omejec (born 9 January 1962) is a Croatian jurist who served as the 4th President of the Constitutional Court of Croatia. She was the first woman to have held the position. Since 1990, Omejec is a professor at the Chair of Administrative Law of the Zagreb Faculty of Law.

== Early life and education ==
Jasna Omejec was born on January 9, 1962, in Osijek where she finished elementary and high school. She graduated law from the Faculty of Law of the University of Osijek in 1985.

== Career ==
After graduation, Omejec started working as an assistant at the Department of Administrative Law of the Osijek Faculty of Law (1986-1990). In 1990 she transferred to the Faculty of Law of the University of Zagreb where she worked as a post-graduate lecturer in administrative law and political sciences, and had started her postgraduate studies. Omejec gained her PhD in Administrative Law in 1994. In year 1999, she was elected judge of the Constitutional Court of Croatia by the Croatian Parliament. Her election was supported by the Liberal Party, Croatian Peasant Party, Istrian Democratic Assembly and Croatian People's Party – Liberal Democrats. She served as a vice-president and deputy president of the Court. On June 12, 2008, Omejec was elected first woman president of the Constitutional Court. On June 12, 2012, Parliament elected her for the second term as judge of the Constitutional Court. She was also reelected as Court's president. During her term in office she administered the presidential oath of office to the 3rd President of Croatia Ivo Josipović on 18 February 2010 and the 4th President of Croatia Kolinda Grabar-Kitarović on 15 February 2015 (for a term beginning on 19 February 2015). The latter instance marked the first time that two women had taken part in the presidential inauguration ceremony.

== Controversies during appointment ==
The law on the Constitutional Court which was valid at the time of her first appointment prescribed that the Judge of the Constitutional Court had to have at least 15 years of work experience in the field of law, while Omejec had 12. Croatian Parliament then changed the law and determined that the Judge of the Constitutional court could have 12 years of service but in that case had to hold Ph.D. in law. Because of these changes Omejec was appointed as a judge.

This was heavily criticized by many including Đurđa Adlešić and Željko Jovanović. Adlešić, a member of the Croatian Social Liberal Party, stated in 1999 that Zlatko Kramarić (Liberal Party) and Mato Arlović (Social Democratic Party) were secretly arranging Omejec's election with Croatian Democratic Union.

== Other ==
Omejec is a member and founder of the Croatian Academy of Legal Sciences since 2001. She was a longtime member of the Liberal Party.

She is the author of many scientific works among which Convention for the Protection of Human Rights and Fundamental Freedoms in the practice of the European Court of Human Rights stands out.

Omejec's curriculum vitae includes:

- Co-authoring the first Croatian textbook on environmental law in 1997
- Authoring "The Council of Europe and the European Union: Institutional and Legal Framework", in 2008.
- Authoring several papers and articles in the fields of real estate law, citizenship rights, intergovernmental relations between the federal and local Croatian self-government, and electoral law.
- Co-authoring several compendia on constitutional court practice.
- She was Croatian lead member of the Statelessness/Citizenship in the Former Yugoslavia Project, a part of the UNHCR, in Geneva in 1995.
- Member of the Croatian Government Commission for equality issues in 1998.
- Founder-member of the Croatian Academy of Legal Sciences.
- Member of the Institute for Public Administration in Zagreb.
- Substitute member of the European Commission for Democracy through Law (the Venice Commission) from the Republic of Croatia in 2005; was re-appointed in 2009, and in 2010 was elected a member of the Commission.
- Lecturer in the post-graduate doctoral studies "Public Law and Public Administration", "Administrative Law - National and European Aspect" and "Post-graduate Specialised University Studies of Public Administration" at Zagreb University.
- Post-graduate guest-lecturer in Civil Law at the Faculty of Law; in European Law at the Faculty of Political Sciences; and in Environmental Law at the Faculty of Chemical Engineering and Technology, all at Zagreb University.
- Organizer, lecturer and participant at numerous scientific and professional domestic and international conferences, seminars, and symposiums.
