= Jadranko Crnić =

Croatian lawyer

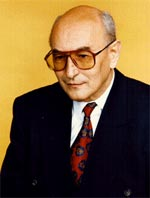

1st President of the Constitutional Court of Croatia
- In office 7 December 1991 – 6 December 1999
- Preceded by: Position established
- Succeeded by: Smiljko Sokol

Personal details
- Born: 25 March 1928 Zagreb, Kingdom of Yugoslavia
- Died: 4 April 2008 (aged 80) Zagreb, Croatia
- Spouse: Hedviga Crnić
- Children: Ivica; Ana-Marija
- Education: University of Zagreb

Jadranko Crnić (1928-2008) was a Croatian lawyer who served as the 1st President of the Constitutional Court of Croatia between 1991 and 1999 and president of the Croatian Red Cross.

== Early life and education ==
Jadranko Crnić was born on 25 March 1928 in the Croatian capital of Zagreb in the family of Rudolf and Ana (née Hirschler) Crnić. He is of Jewish descent from his mother's side. His mother was a teacher in Dugo Selo, and his father a sea captain who authored one of the first naval dictionaries in the Kingdom of Yugoslavia. Crnić attended elementary school in Dugi Selo, after which he enrolled in the elite Classical Gymnasium in Zagreb. During the holocaust, he and his mother avoided prosecution by the Nazi collaborators Ustaše by concealing their Jewish origin. He graduated from the Zagreb Faculty of Law in 1952, passed bar exam in 1955, and gained PhD in 1998.

== Career ==
Following his graduation in 1952, Crnić worked as a judicial adviser at the Dugo Selo District Court, then as a judge in the Gorski Kotar County Court, and eventually as a judge and president of the Gospić District Court. He worked in Lika for 10 years. Afterwards, he returned to Dugo Selo where he worked as a lawyer until his appointment as the president of the local municipal court. He then became a judge of the Supreme Court of the Socialist Republic of Croatia, then the president of the Court's Civil Department, and eventually Court's Vice President. On 1 October 1984, Crnić was appointed Justice of the Constitutional Court of the Socialist Republic of Croatia. It was unclear to many of his colleagues why he, as a renowned legal expert, accepted a position on the, at the time, highly polarized Constitutional Court whose members didn't even have to be lawyers. Nevertheless, in 1990, he became the Court's president. In December 1991, Crnić was elected Associate Justice of the Constitutional Court of the Republic of Croatia, and on 7 December 1991 Court's president. He was re-elected president on 11 November 1995 for a new four-year mandate.

Crnić was a member of the Constitutional Commission of the Presidency of the Republic of Croatia which was working on a draft of the first Constitution of the Republic of Croatia in 1990. At the first multiparty parliamentary election, he was Chairman of the Republic Election Control Committee and in 2000 members of the Working Group of the President of the Republic of Croatia for the Preparation of a Professional Basis for the Change of the Constitution.

On 27 February 1997, he became the President of the Croatian Red Cross. He is remembered for saying: "There is an angel in every human being. It only needs to be awaken." He participated in the work of a number of law-making groups, was the editor-in-chief of the "Zakonitost" (Legality) journal, a member of the working group "Law and Society Fundamental Research" of the Croatian Academy of Sciences and Arts and several legal journals. He held numerous lectures about human rights and fundamental freedoms, about which he also wrote many scientific papers. Crnić was also a Managing Director of the Adris Foundation and President of the Administrative Council of the Croatian News Agency. He has published several hundred articles, authored 40 books with repeated editions in the field of labor, property, housing and constitutional rights law and family and hereditary rights. In addition, he is a founder and first editor of one of the oldest local newspapers in Croatia "Dugoselske kronike" (Dugo Selo Chronicles).

== Awards ==
Crnić was the honorary president of the 100th anniversary of the "Preporod" Cultural Arts Society from Dugi Selo, the winner of the annual Dugi Selo Lifetime Achievement Award in 1996, honorary citizen of Fužine and Mrkopalj Municipalities and the town of Senj, Knight of the Order of Saint Lazarus, a member of the Brethren of the Croatian Dragon, and General Major in the Legal Service of the Armed Forces of Croatia. He was awarded Homeland War Memorial Medal and many other decorations.

== Private life ==
Jadranko Crnić was married to Hedviga Crnić with whom he had two children, daughter Ana-Marija, and son Ivica (b. 9 January 1951). His son Ivica is a renowned Croatian jurist who served as a minister without portfolio in 1992, Minister of Justice and Public Administration in 1992 and again between 1994 and 1995. Since 16 May 2005, Ivica Crnić serves as a Supreme Court judge. Jadranko Crnić died from a heart disease on 4 April 2008 at the age of 80.

== Literature ==
- Topić, Predrag (2012). Iz dnevnika jednog pomorca, Dugo Selo: Gradska knjižnica. 978-953-7737-10-8
- Foretić, Davorka (2009). Liber amicorum in honorem Jadranko Crnić: (1928.-2008.), Zagreb: Novi informator. 978-953-7327-60-6
