= Crnić =

Crnić is a South Slavic surname. It may refer to:

- Ivica Crnić, Minister of Justice of Croatia (1992–1995)
- Jadranko Crnić (1928–2008), Croatian lawyer and judge
- Josip Crnić (born 1989), Croatian handball player
- Jovan Crnić (born 1994), Serbian basketball player

== See also ==
- Črnic, Slovene form
