= Association for Serbian language and literature in Croatia =

Organization

- Друштво за српски језик и књижевност у Хрватској; Društvo za srpski jezik i književnost u Hrvatskoj
- Formation: 26 June 1998
- Headquarters: Vukovar
- Official language: Serbian and Croatian
- President: Mara Bekić-Vojinović
- Website: Official website

The Association for Serbian language and literature in Croatia (Serbo-Croatian: Друштво за српски језик и књижевност у Хрватској, Društvo za srpski jezik i književnost u Hrvatskoj) is a non-profit professional organization that brings together scientists and technical workers engaged in studying and teaching of Serbian language and literature in Croatia. The association operates throughout Croatia and its headquarters are located in Vukovar. The association was established in 1998, after the completion of the UNTAES mission in the region, with ambition to work on protection of the Serbian language and the literature of Serbs in Croatia, engage in the study of the history and culture of the Serb people in Croatia, and present its cultural heritage.

== History ==
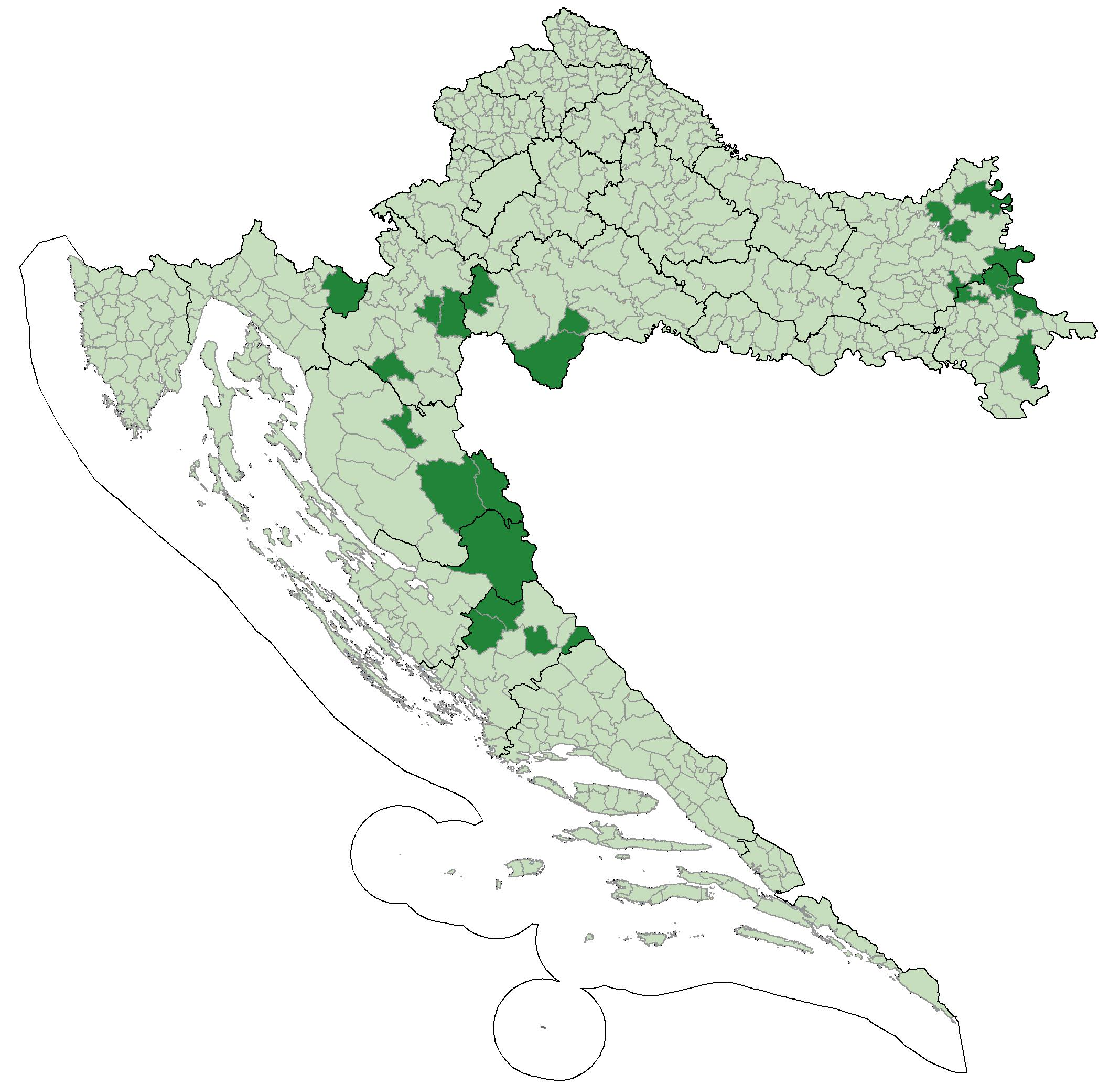
Serbian language as co-official minority language in municipalities in Croatia

The original idea for the establishment of the association was proposed by professor Dušan Ivanić from the University of Belgrade Faculty of Philology who himself was originally from the region of Lika. The founding group led by the president Mara Bekić-Vojinović was influenced by the death of Stanko Korać in 1994, prolific researcher of Serb literature in Croatia, and determination to look for continuation of his work which led to the establishment of the initial contact with Dušan Ivanić.

In early 2011, the association released the inaugural edition of the Proceedings, which was presented at various schools and institutions in Croatia and the surrounding region. The publication of the book was financially supported by the municipalities of Vukovar, Trpinja, Markušica, Šodolovci, Erdut, as well as through private donations. The association has also conducted numerous seminars as part of its activities.

In the pursuit of its objectives, the association engages in collaborations with professors from institutions such as the University of Belgrade, University of Zagreb, University of Novi Sad, as well as with organizations like Matica srpska, Joint Council of Municipalities, and the Institute for the Serbian Language in Belgrade, among others.

The 25th anniversary of the association was marked at the local branch of the SKD Prosvjeta in Osijek in 2023. The second ceremony was organized in December 2023 at the Serbian Cultural Centre in Vukovar.

== Publications ==
The association published a couple of books over the years:

- Reče mi reč [The word told me], (2010)
- Trepčo, ljubavi moja [Trepča, My Love], (2011)
- U podne bilo [At noon it was], (2013)
- Reče mi reč - drugo izdanje [The word told me - Second Edition], (2018)
- Pismo ti pišem [I am Writing You a Letter], (2021)

== See also ==
- Serbian language in Croatia
- Minority languages of Croatia
