= Miroslav Šeparović =

Croatian lawyer and politician

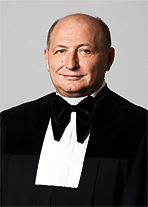

5th President of the Constitutional Court of Croatia
- In office 13 June 2016 – 12 October 2025
- Preceded by: Jasna Omejec
- Succeeded by: Frane Staničić

Justice of the Constitutional Court of Croatia
- In office 14 April 2009 – 12 April 2026

Minister of Justice
- In office 18 May 1995 – 20 April 1998
- Preceded by: Ivica Crnić
- Succeeded by: Milan Ramljak

Personal details
- Born: 18 July 1958 (age 68) Blato, SR Croatia, SFR Yugoslavia (modern Croatia)
- Education: University of Zagreb

Miroslav Šeparović (born 18 July 1958) is a Croatian lawyer who served as the 5th President of the Constitutional Court of Croatia (2016–2025) and the 5th Minister of Justice in the Cabinet of Zlatko Mateša from 1995 to 1998.

== Early life and education ==
Miroslav Šeparović was born on 18 July 1958 in Blato on the island of Korčula where he finished elementary and high school.

He graduated law from the Zagreb Faculty of Law in 1981. He passed the bar exam in 1983, and notary exam in 1994. He earned his PhD from the same Faculty in 2013 with a thesis entitled, The welfare of the child and the principle of the best interests of the child in the practice of the European Court of Human Rights and the Croatian Constitutional Court.

== Career ==
After graduation, Šeparović worked as a legal clerk in the Blato Winery in Zagreb (1981-1983), and then in the Military building institution Prečko (1984-1986). In 1986, he was appointed judge of the Municipal Court in Zagreb. In 1989, Šeparović got employed in the Ministry of Justice where he worked in the Directorate for Property and Legal Affairs. In 1995, he was appointed Minister. As a Minister, Šeparović participated in the drafting and implementation of regulations in the areas of civil law, the judicial system and criminal law reform. In 1998, he got a job at the Croatian Intelligence Service and become deputy head of the National Security Office. Since year 2000, he worked in private practice as a lawyer. He also served as a defender of general Mladen Markač at the International Criminal Tribunal for the former Yugoslavia. On 14 April 2009, Croatian Parliament appointed him judge of the Constitutional Court.

Šeparović served as the 5th President of the Constitutional Court of Croatia for three consecutive terms from 13 June 2016 to 12 October 2025. He was succeeded as President by Frane Staničić, who previously served as one of the judges of the Court.

== Other ==
Šeparović is a member of the Croatian Academy of Legal Sciences.

== Awards ==
He was awarded the Order of the Croatian Trefoil, Homeland War Memorial Medal, Homeland's Gratitude Medal, Memorial Medal Vukovar and the Order of Duke Branimir.

== Controversy ==
In 2018, Committee on Ethics in Science and Higher Education (CESHE) concluded that Šeparović was guilty of plagiarism since his doctoral thesis contained repeated instances of "incomplete and opaque citations" of other people's work.

In response, Šeparović filed criminal complaints against all the five members of the CESHE because he thought that the Committee members misused their positions and overstepped the jurisdiction which was limited by the Constitutional Court in 2017. Whereas, CESHE chairman Ivica Vilibić considered that it was a new development in an ongoing effort to weaken the Committee.
