= Frane Staničić =

Croatian lawyer and professor

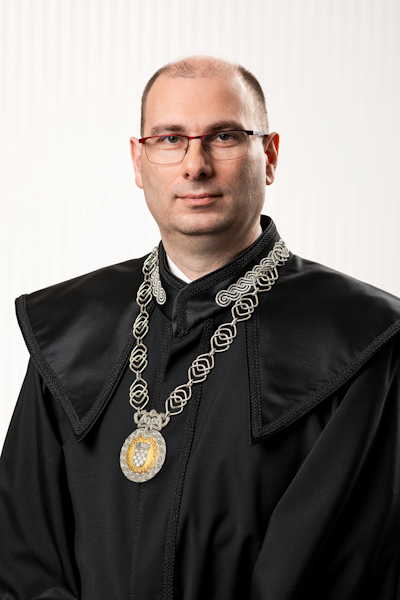

6th President of the Constitutional Court of Croatia
- Incumbent
- Assumed office 13 October 2025
- Preceded by: Miroslav Šeparović

Justice of the Constitutional Court of Croatia
- Incumbent
- Assumed office 7 December 2024

Personal details
- Born: 5 August 1981 (age 45) Makarska, SR Croatia, SFR Yugoslavia (modern Croatia)
- Education: University of Zagreb
- Awards: Hungarian Officer's Cross of Merit

Frane Staničić (born 5 August 1981) is a Croatian lawyer, legal scholar, and university professor who has served as the President of the Constitutional Court of Croatia since 13 October 2025. He has been a professor at the Faculty of Law in the University of Zagreb since 2022.

== Early life and education ==
Staničić was born in Makarska on 5 August 1981. He graduated from the Faculty of Law at the University of Zagreb in 2006, earning his doctorate with a thesis titled "Development of the Institute of Expropriation in Croatia" in 2011 at the same faculty.

== Career ==
In 2006, he was appointed as a junior teaching assistant at the University of Zagreb, promoted to senior teaching assistant in 2011, assistant professor in 2012, and associate professor in 2017. In 2022, he was promoted to full professor. Additionally, he serves as the Head of the Study Center for Public Administration and Public Finance at the faculty, holding the rank of Vice Dean. He also lectures at the Hungarian Central European Academy in Budapest.

Between 2007 and 2008, he served as an external associate of the Ministry of Science, Education and Sports, working in the recognition of foreign higher education qualifications. In 2017, he served as an advisor to the Minister of Science and Education regarding legal matters. In December 2024, he was elected to become a justice of the Constitutional Court. In 2025, he was elected President of the Constitutional Court by only eight of the justices, five abstaining from the vote. His deputy is Maša Marochini Zrinski.
