= Constitutional Act on the Constitutional Court of the Republic of Croatia =

Croatian Parliament
- Citation: The Constitutional Act on the Constitutional Court of the Republic of Croatia (PDF), 3 May 2002
- Passed: 24 September 1999
- Effective: 29 September 1999
- Status: In force

The Constitutional Act on the Constitutional Court of the Republic of Croatia (Croatian: Ustavni Zakon o Ustavnom sudu Republike Hrvatske) is a constitutional law which defines the duties and work of the Constitutional Court of Croatia. It is one of three Constitutional Acts in the Croatian legal framework, the others being the Constitutional Act on the Implementation of the Constitution of Croatia and the Constitutional Act on the Rights of National Minorities in the Republic of Croatia. The current act was adopted on September 24, 1999, by the Croatian Parliament.

The law determines the conditions for the election of judges of the Constitutional Court and the termination of their duties, the conditions and deadlines for initiating proceedings to assess the conformity of laws with the Constitution and the conformity of other regulations with the Constitution and the law, the procedure and legal effect of its decisions and the protection of human rights and fundamental freedoms guaranteed by the Constitution.

== History ==
On March 21, 1991, the Croatian Parliament passed the first Constitutional Act on the Constitutional Court.

On September 24, 1999, a new Act was passed, which replaced the previous one. On March 15, 2002, parliament passed an amendment to the Act.

== Provisions ==
=== I. General Provisions ===
This section declares that the Court guarantees respect for and application of the Constitution of Croatia and that it bases its activities on the Constitution and this Act. The Court is independent of all state authorities, independently allocates its funds and its proceedings are public.

The judges of the court have the same immunity as members of the Croatian Parliament meaning they cannot be held criminally liable, detained or punished for expressing an opinion or voting in the Court. A judge may not be detained nor can criminal proceedings be initiated against him without the approval of the Court unless he has committed an offense punishable by imprisonment for more than five years.

=== II. Conditions for the Election of Judges of the Constitutional Court, Election of Judges of the Constitutional Court and Termination of Their Duties ===
The requirements for becoming a judge are to be a Croatian citizen and a law graduate with at least 15 years of work experience in the legal profession or, if they have a doctorate, with at least 12 years of work experience in the legal profession.

The process of electing a judge to the Court is defined in Article 6. The Croatian Parliament committee responsible for the Constitution publishes a call for nominations, reviews the candidates, compiles a list of the best candidates and submits it to Parliament. The Parliament then votes on each candidate individually and the candidates that get the majority of votes are elected to the Court. The elected judge takes office on the day the term of the judge he was elected to replace expires.

Judges must take the following oath before the President: "I swear on my honor that in performing my duties as a judge of the Constitutional Court of the Republic of Croatia, I will adhere to the Constitution and laws of the Republic of Croatia and that I will conscientiously perform my duties."

The judges of the Court may not hold any other public or professional office except if they are university professor in law but they must teach outside of their employment and to a reduced extent.

A judge may be dismissed from office before his term expires if he requests it himself, if he is sentenced to prison or if he permanently loses the ability to perform his duty.

The President of the Constitutional Court is elected for a term of 4 years by a majority vote of all judges.

A judge of the Court may not be a member of any political party nor may he publicly express personal favoritism towards any political party.

=== III. Procedure before the Constitutional Court - General Provisions ===
Proceedings before the Constitutional Court are initiated by a written request, proposal and constitutional complaint which are delivered directly or sent to it by mail. Submissions must be in the Croatian language and Latin script unless the person submitting the request lives in a place where another official language or script is in use. If the submission is incomprehensible or does not contain everything necessary, the Court may return the submission to the applicant for correction.

The Court makes decisions and rulings by a majority vote of all judges and the decisions and rulings must be explained. A judge of the Court may not abstain from voting, except in cases where he participated in the adoption of the law, regulation or decision that is the subject of the Court's decision.

Decisions and important rulings of the Constitutional Court must be published in "Narodne Novine".

Every physical and legal person is obliged to respect the decisions and rulings of the Constitutional Court while all bodies of state government, local and regional administration are obliged to implement the decisions and rulings of the Court.

The Court will make a decision on a request, accepted proposal and constitutional complaint within a maximum period of one year.

=== IV. Review of the Constitutionality of Laws and the Constitutionality and Legality of Other Regulations ===
A request initiating proceedings before the Constitutional Court may be filed by: one fifth of the representatives of the Croatian Parliament, a working body of the Croatian Parliament, the President of the Republic of Croatia, the Government of the Republic of Croatia for the assessment of the conformity of regulations with the Constitution and law, the Supreme Court of the Republic of Croatia or another court, if the question of constitutionality and legality arises in proceedings conducted before that court or by the Ombudsman.

If the representative body of a unit of local and regional self-government considers that a law regulating the organisation, competence or financing of units of local and regional self-government is not in accordance with the Constitution, it may present a request with the Court to review the constitutionality of that law or some of its provisions.

Every natural and legal person has the right to propose the initiation of a procedure for assessing the conformity of a law with the Constitution and the Constitutional Court itself can also initiate that procedure.

The Court shall commence proceedings no later than one year after the submission of the proposal.

The Court shall make a decision at a special session. This session may be held if the majority of the total number of judges is present at the session. The Court will repeal a law or its individual provisions if it finds that it is inconsistent with the Constitution.

=== V. Protection of Human Rights and Fundamental Freedoms ===
Anyone may file a constitutional complaint with the Constitutional Court if they believe that their human right or fundamental freedom guaranteed by the Constitution has been violated. If another legal remedy is permitted due to the violation of constitutional rights, a constitutional complaint may be filed only after that legal remedy has been exhausted.

The reporting judge invites the applicant to supplement the constitutional complaint or to correct it if not understandable, delivers, if needed, a copy of the constitutional complaint to the interested persons and invites them to respond to it and demands, if needed, the delivery of the file which relates to the matter of the constitutional complaint.

The proceedings instituted by the constitutional complaint shall end: when the applicant dies, when the applicant, who is a legal person ceases to exist or in case the constitutional complaint is withdrawn.

=== VI. Resolving Jurisdictional Disputes Between the Legislative, Executive and Judicial Branches ===
If a conflict of jurisdiction arises between legislative, executive or judicial bodies, each of these bodies may request the Constitutional Court to resolve the conflict. A request for resolution of a conflict of jurisdiction may also be submitted by a party whose interest has been or could be violated due to the conflict.

=== VII. Proceedings on the Impeachment of the President of the Republic Of Croatia ===
The act of the Croatian Parliament concerning the impeachment of the President shall contain the description of facts and the legal qualification as well as the evidence of the violation of the Constitution for which the President is charged. The Court will obtain the opinion of the president and allow him to participate in the proceedings.

=== VIII. Control of the Constitutionality of Programs and Activities of Political Parties ===
The Constitutional Court controls the constitutionality of programs and activities of political parties and shall ban their work if it determines that the requirements provided by the Constitution and law exist.

The request to ban the work of a political party may be submitted by the President, the Parliament, the Government, the Supreme Court, the body authorized for registration of political parties and the State Attorney of the Republic of Croatia.

=== IX. Control of the Constitutionality and Legality of Elections and National Referendums and Electoral Disputes ===
Political parties, candidates, at least 100 voters or at least 5% of voters in the electoral unit in which the elections are being held, can ask the Constitutional Court to take appropriate measures if these activities are carried out contrary to the Constitution and the law. They can also file an appeal with the Constitutional Court (electoral dispute). The Court is obliged to make a decision on the appeal within 48 hours of receiving it and resolves electoral disputes in a panel composed of three judges. The panel can make a decision only unanimously, and if it fails, the whole Court decides on the dispute.

At the request of the Croatian Parliament, the Constitutional Court shall, in the case where ten percent of the total number of voters in Croatia request the calling of a referendum, determine whether the content of the referendum question is in accordance with the Constitution.

=== X. Constitutional Court Procedures of Appeal ===
A judge may appeal to the Constitutional Court against the decision to relieve him of office or the decision of the National Judicial Council on disciplinary responsibility within a term of 15 days after the disputed decision has been delivered. The appeal is decided by a majority vote of a panel of the Constitutional Court composed of six judges. The panel is obliged to issue a decision within 30 days of receiving it.

== See also ==
- Constitution of Croatia
- Constitutional Act on the Rights of National Minorities in the Republic of Croatia
