= Smiljko Sokol =

Croatian judge

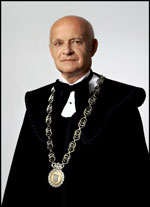
- 1999

2nd President of the Constitutional Court of Croatia
- In office 7 December 1999 – 6 December 2003

Member of the Croatian Parliament
- In office 29 October 1995 – 1999

Personal details
- Born: 25 November 1940 Zagreb, Kingdom of Yugoslavia
- Died: 13 April 2023 (aged 82) Zagreb, Croatia

Smiljko Sokol (1940-2023) was a former president of the Constitutional Court of Croatia. He was in office from 7 December 1999 to 6 December 2003.
