= Constitutional Act on the Rights of National Minorities in the Republic of Croatia =

Legislation

- Original title: Ustavni zakon o pravima nacionalnih manjina
- Ratified: 23 December 2002
- Purpose: constitutional law level legal protection of national minorities rights in Croatia

Official website
- Ustavni zakon o pravima nacionalnih manjina

The Constitutional Act on the Rights of National Minorities in the Republic of Croatia (Croatian: Ustavni zakon o pravima nacionalnih manjina) is a constitutional law that defines and guarantees the rights of national minorities within the Republic of Croatia. It is one of three Constitutional Acts in the Croatian legal framework, the others being the Constitutional Act on the Implementation of the Constitution of Croatia and the Constitutional Act on the Constitutional Court of the Republic of Croatia. The current version of the Act was enacted on 23 December 2002, following amendments to its predecessor, the Constitutional Act on National and Ethnic Communities or Minorities, originally adopted in December 1991.

The adoption of the 1991 Act was a significant step in Croatia’s transition to independence from the Socialist Federal Republic of Yugoslavia, responding to explicit preconditions set by the international community for the recognition of Croatian independence. This Act holds a higher legal authority than ordinary laws and regulations and requires compliance from all lower levels of government, ensuring the uniform protection of minority rights across the country.

In addition to this Constitutional Act, two specific laws were enacted to further elaborate on minority rights: the Law on Use of Languages and Scripts of National Minorities and the Law on Education in the Language and Script of National Minorities. These laws specifically address minority language rights in public life and education. Furthermore, the Constitution of Croatia itself includes provisions for the protection of national minorities, explicitly recognizing and enumerating Croatia’s traditional minority communities.

== History ==
=== Constitutional Act on National and Ethnic Communities or Minorities ===
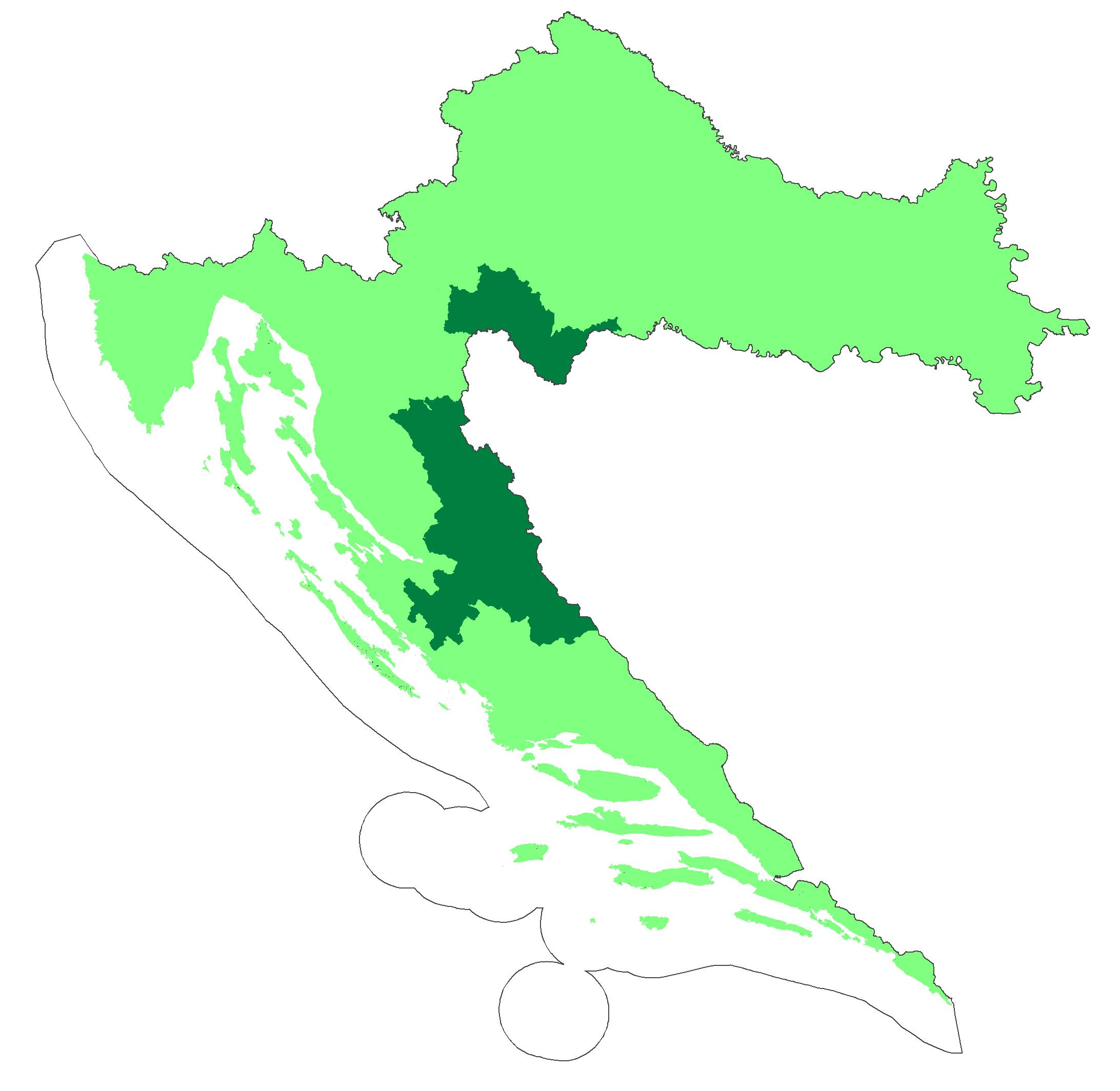
Two Autonomous Districts of Croatia are shown in dark green

In December 1991 Croatian Parliament adopted the "Constitutional Act on Human Rights and Freedoms and Rights of National and Ethnic Communities or Minorities in the Republic of Croatia" which was prerequisite for international recognition of Croatia.

From period of Socialist Federal Republic of Yugoslavia Croatia inherited and recognized relatively high level of protection of collective minority rights. Problem arose with protection of rights of "new minorities", respectively members of other six constituent nations of former state excluding Croats (Serbs, Slovenes, Bosniaks, Macedonians and Montenegrins). The problem was especially pronounced with Serbs of Croatia that had status of sovereign people within Socialist Republic of Croatia.

In 1992 Croatia changed law in order to include right on political autonomy in areas where minorities are actually majority of population. In addition to right to be represented and wide rights on cultural autonomy law now provided right to establish autonomous districts in areas where some minority constitute majority according to 1981 Yugoslav census. However, in practice this provision was never implemented since areas that fulfilled conditions were part of Republic of Serbian Krajina.

Constitutional Law provided two types of monitoring of its implementation- international monitoring and cooperation in its implementation with Autonomous Districts.

In late September 1995 after Operation Storm Croatia returned control over its entire territory except Eastern Slavonia, Baranja and Western Syrmia region which came under control of UNTAES. Croatian Parliament initially temporarily suspended application of Law provisions granting right on political autonomy sparking international criticism. Subsequently that part was completely abolished.

One of the first preconditions for starting of Accession of Croatia to the European Union was adoption of new law on national minorities rights.

== Rights ==
=== Right to be represented ===
==== Croatian Parliament ====
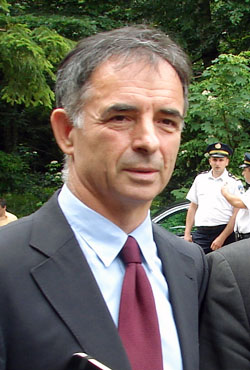
Milorad Pupovac is one of parliamentary representative of Serbs of Croatia

Under the Constitutional Act on the Rights of National Minorities, national minorities that participate in total population of Croatia with more than 1.5% (only Serbs of Croatia) are guaranteed minimum one and maximum of three seats in Croatian Parliament. Minorities that constitute less than 1.5% of total population (other minorities) can elect 4 members of Parliament in total.

Law proscribed establishment of special District XII of Croatian Parliament electoral districts for elections of representatives of national minorities.

==== Regional and local level ====
Under the Constitutional Act on the Rights of National Minorities, municipalities and cities or towns where members of minority consist from 5% up to 15% they have right to have one representative in local council. If locally some minority consist more than 15% or at the county level more than 5% of population, that minority have right on proportional representation in local and regional councils.

In administrative units where national minority have right on proportional representation in representative bodies, it also have right on proportional representation in executive bodies. Minorities have right to elect deputies of municipal/town/city mayor or deputy county prefects.

National minorities have right on proportional representation in government bodies and judicial authorities in proportion in which they participate in total population of area in which that body performs its jurisdiction.

In order to realize these rights members of national minorities have right of priority in employment when they explicitly invoke that right in application and when they equally as other candidates meet all other criteria.

=== State Council for National Minorities ===
State Council for National Minorities is an autonomous umbrella body of national minorities at the state level that connects institutions and interests of national minorities in Croatia. It is a body that deals with comprehensive minority issues within the Constitutional Law on National Minorities and all other laws pertaining to national minorities.

Council is entitled to propose discussions regarding national minorities to Parliament and Government of Croatia, especially about issues regarding implementation of Constitutional Law and special laws regulating the rights of national minorities. Council have the right to give opinions and proposals about public radio and television stations programs as well as proposals for the implementation of economic, social and other measures in regions traditionally or predominantly inhabited by national minorities. Furthermore, the Council has the right to seek and obtain the required data and reports from government bodies and local and regional governments.

There are three types of representation in Council. All minority MPs automatically enter the Council. The second group, which consists of five members, are representatives of national minorities from the professional, cultural, religious and scientific community and representatives of minority associations, appointed by the Government on the proposal of associations, legal entities and citizens belonging to national minorities. The third group are representatives from the Council for National Minorities, which has seven members.

=== National Minorities Councils ===
==== Serb National Council ====
The Serb National Council (Croatian: Srpsko narodno vijeće, Serbian Cyrillic: Српско народно вијеће) is elected political, consulting and coordinating body acting as a form of self-government and institution of cultural autonomy of Serbs of Croatia in matters regarding civil rights and cultural identity. Council main focuses are human, civil and national rights, as well the issues of Serbs of Croatia identity, participation and integration in the Croatian society. County level council exist in city of Zagreb and all counties except Krapina-Zagorje County.

==== Joint Council of Municipalities ====
Alongside Serb National Council, interests of the Serb ethnic community in the Osijek-Baranja and Vukovar-Syrmia County are additionally represented by Joint Council of Municipalities, sui generis body formed on the basis of Erdut Agreement. Organization functions as National Coordination body in these two counties.

=== Action Plan for Law implementation ===
Government adopt regular two-year action plans for implementation of Constitutional law. For implementation of 2011-2013 Action plan government has allocated 143,704,348 Croatian kunas.

== Criticisms ==
On tenth anniversary of Constitutional law Serb Democratic Forum sent a statement arguing that law served just to strengthen minority elites and did not actually strengthen the rights of national minorities. According to them, Constitutional Law is just collection of good wishes and European standards which face constant obstruction from state and at local levels. They add that national minority councils have failed to consume their role and become bodies without any real role and functions in local communities while Council for National Minorities became politicized institution through which minority elites generate their own, and not the interests of the minority communities they represent.

In 2011 Constitutional Court of Croatia after Left of Croatia, Serb Democratic Forum, Croatian Helsinki Committee and GONG repealed Law provision which guaranteed that Serbian minority will elect three members of parliament in one of regular constituency. This provision was enacted as a compromise between part of representatives of Serbian community and Jadranka Kosor government after government introduced double vote rights for all minorities except Serbs. Court pointed out that no one can have guaranteed number of places in parliament but that government can introduce double voting rights for all minorities in special minority constituency and regular territorial one.

== See also ==
- Minority languages of Croatia
- Act of Parliament
