= Mato Arlović =

Croatian lawyer and politician

Justice of the Constitutional Court of Croatia
- In office 21 July 2009 – 12 April 2026

Member of the Croatian Parliament
- In office 30 May 1990 – 11 January 2008

Personal details
- Born: 4 November 1952 (age 73) Orašje, FPR Yugoslavia
- Party: League of Communists of Croatia (1970–1990); Social Democratic Party of Croatia (1990–2009)
- Spouse: Branka Arlović
- Children: 2
- Education: University of Osijek
- Awards: Order of the Croatian Trefoil

Mato Arlović (born 4 November 1952) is a Croatian lawyer and former politician who was an Associate Justice of the Constitutional Court of Croatia from 21 July 2009 to 12 April 2026, having previously served five consecutive terms as a member of the Croatian Parliament between 1990 and 2007 for the center-left Social Democratic Party of Croatia.

== Early life and education ==
Mato Arlović was born on 4 November 1952 in a Croat family in the municipality of Orašje in Bosnia and Herzegovina where he finished elementary and high school. He graduated law from the Faculty of Law of the University of Osijek in 1979, gained master's degree in 1982, passed bar exam in 1995, and gained a PhD in 2012 with the thesis "The Right of National Minorities in the Republic of Croatia - Constitutional Law and Their Contradiction with Human Rights and Fundamental Freedoms".

== Career ==
In 1970, Arlović joined League of Communists of Croatia. In the same year, he got employed at the Županja Boris Kidrič Sugar Factory where he worked until 1975. Following his graduation in 1979, he started working at the Osijek Faculty of Law. In 1988, Arlović become secretary of the Osijek Municipal Assembly where he worked until October 1990 when he returned to teaching at the Osijek Faculty of Law. Arlović was a delegate at the historical 1990 14th Congress of the League of Communists of Yugoslavia. He was elected to the Croatian Parliament from the list of center-left Social Democratic Party of Croatia for the first time at the 1990 parliamentary election and was re-elected in 1992, 1995, 2000 and 2003. Arlović left active politics in 2007 after, at the time, newly elected SDP president Zoran Milanović put him at the 3rd place of the SDP electoral list in the 5th electoral district, which he took as an offense. During his time as an MP, Arlović served as a Vice President for Parliament (2000-2003; 2004–2007) and president of Judiciary and Administration Committee, Labour, Retirement System and Social Partnership Committee, Committee on Maritime Affairs and Transportation and Committee on the Constitution, Standing Orders and Political System. He was also a member of several supervisory boards, including the ones of Badel 1862 and Croatian Radiotelevision. He was also a vice president of SDP. On 21 July 2009, he was elected Justice of the Constitutional Court of Croatia, and was reelected for a second 8-year term on 11 October 2017, serving until 12 April, 2026.

== Private life ==
Mate Arlović is married to Branka Arlović with whom he has two sons.
