= Law on Use of Languages and Scripts of National Minorities =

Croatian law on minority languages

Law on Use of Languages and Scripts of National Minorities Zakon o uporabi jezika i pisma nacionalnih manjina

Law on Use of Languages and Scripts of National Minorities (Croatian: Zakon o uporabi jezika i pisma nacionalnih manjina) is a law which defines the use of minority languages in Croatia. Additionally Croatian Constitutional law on national minorities rights and The Law on Education in language and script of national minorities explicitly define rights on usage of minority languages in Croatia.

== Rights ==
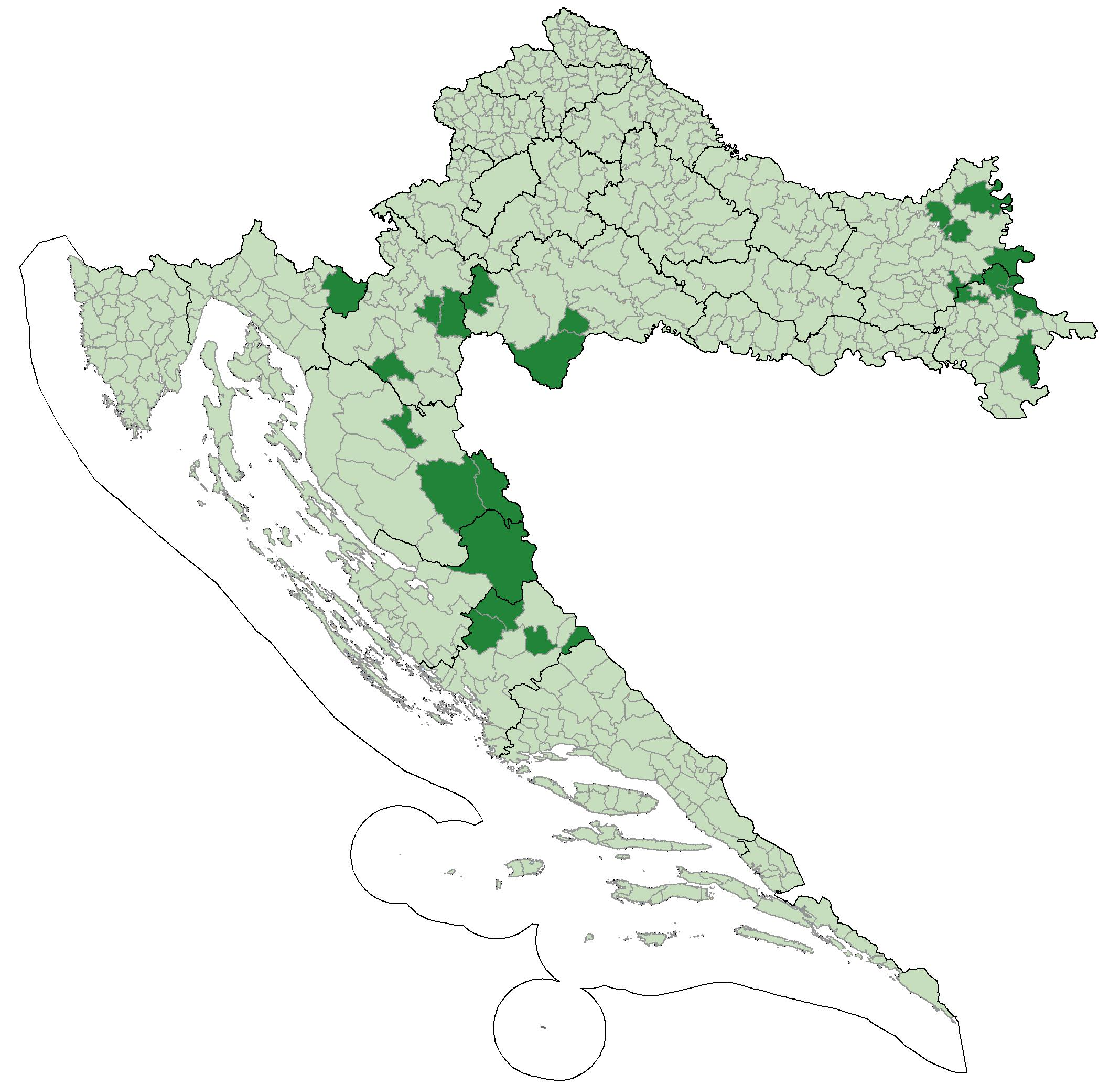
Serbian language as co-official minority language in municipalities in Croatia

Local governments to which this law applies (Municipalities of Croatia with at least one third of members of ethnic minority or municipality where right is defined by international agreement) are required to explicitly prescribe equal official use of minority language or script throughout its territory, regulate in detail realization of those rights and expressly prescribe all particular rights guaranteed by Law on Use of Languages and Scripts of National Minorities. They are required to define these rights in their local statutes.

== Implementation ==
In April 2015 United Nations Human Rights Committee urged Croatia to ensure the rights of minorities to use their language and alphabet. The committee report stated that particularly concerns the use of Serbian Cyrillic in the town of Vukovar and the municipalities concerned.

== See also ==
- 2013 Anti-Cyrillic protests in Croatia
- European Charter for Regional or Minority Languages
