= Church of the Holy Annunciation, Dubrovnik =

Serbian Orthodox church in Dubrovnik, Croatia

Church of Holy Annunciation
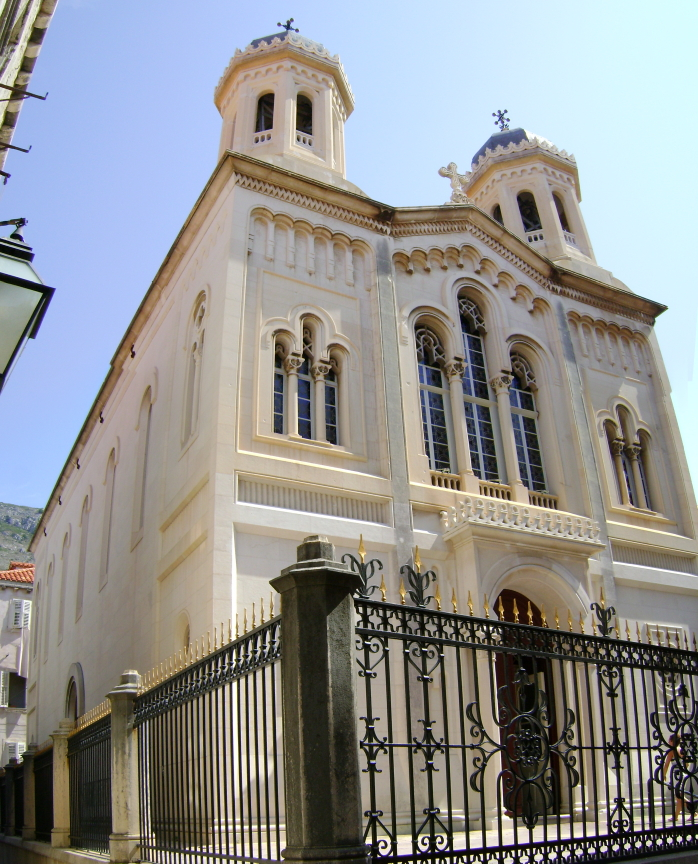
- Church of Holy Annunciation, pictured in 2009
- Church of Holy Annunciation
- 42.641029°N 18.109499°E
- Location: Dubrovnik
- Country: Croatia
- Denomination: Serbian Orthodox Church

History
- Dedication: Annunciation

Architecture
- Style: Neo-Byzantine
- Years built: 1877

Administration
- Diocese: Eparchy of Zachlumia, Herzegovina, and the Littoral

The Church of the Holy Annunciation (Serbian: Црква Светог благовјештења, romanized: Crkva Svetog blagovještenja; Croatian: Crkva svetih Blagovijesti) is a Serbian Orthodox church in Dubrovnik, Croatia.

== History ==
In 1434, during their attempts to capture Herceg Novi, the people of Dubrovnik promised the Bosnian duke Sandalj Hranić that they would allow the construction of an Orthodox church and a shelter for the infirm within the territory of the Republic. Following Sandalj's sudden death, his widow Jelena, daughter of Prince Lazar decided to settle in Dubrovnik after withdrawing from further political struggles. Thinking of her final years, Jelena intended to build a small church in Dubrovnik, where she wished to be buried. To remind the citizens of Dubrovnik of the promise once made to her late husband, she asked her nephew, Despot Đurađ Branković, to mediate on her behalf. The request was refused, with the explanation that papal approval would be required.

After the great earthquake of 1667, about 600 Orthodox families from Herzegovina offered to pay 2,500 gold ducats annually in order to settle in the Republic. Between 1671 and 1674, the Catholic priest Brnja Đurđević advocated in the Senate for permission to build an Orthodox church within Dubrovnik itself. The Senate rejected the proposal, fearing that citizens might be drawn to the church out of convenience and eventually convert to Orthodoxy. In 1743, Pope Benedict XIV, in a letter to Archbishop of Dubrovnik, recommended that Dubrovnik should not allow the settlement of Orthodox Christians.

New demand to build an Orthodox church in the city came when in 1770 Count Orlov's fleet, on a mission to encourage revolt in Greece, confiscated Dubrovnik's ships which were transporting Ottoman reinforcements near Nafplio. In 1775, it was agreed that Russian Empire will send its consul to Dubrovnik and that he will build an Orthodox chapel in the garden of the Russian consulate.

In 1867, in the Municipal Assembly, rich trader Božo Bošković bought three houses of baron Frano Gondola with a garden behind them for a sum of 28,500 fiorins inside the Walls of Dubrovnik in the old town.

The church sustained damage from bombing during the Siege of Dubrovnik.

In 2009, the church was restored using funds from the Ministry of Culture of Croatia, City of Dubrovnik, Dubrovnik-Neretva County, private contributions and credit. This was the first restoration of the church.

A comprehensive history of the church and its parish entitled The Serbian Orthodox Church in Dubrovnik to the Twentieth Century was published in Dubrovnik, Belgrade and in Trebinje in 2007.

== Museum ==
The parish maintains a museum of the Serbian Orthodox Church in Dubrovnik. It houses documents such as a copy of the Miroslav Gospels from 1897, a gospel in Russian printed in Moscow in 1805, as well as busts of Ivan Gundulić and Vuk Stefanović Karadžić It also possesses 18 portraits of which 9 depict Vlaho Bukovac. Other portraits depict Medo Pucić, Valtazar Bogišić, Petar II Petrović-Njegoš and Vuk Stefanović Karadžić. A big collection of icons (some of them dating from the 15th and 16th centuries), highly decorated priest robes, chalices and jewellery is also kept as a part of the Museum collection.

== Library ==
The church owns a library of about 12,000 books. In addition to liturgical books in Church Slavonic language, there are also books on different topics in Italian, French, Russian, and other languages. Of note are a New Testament printed in Kiev in 1703 and a Menologium printed in Kiev in 1757.

== See also ==
- List of Serbian Orthodox churches in Croatia
