= Constitution of Croatia =

Supreme law of Croatia

Constitution of the Republic of Croatia
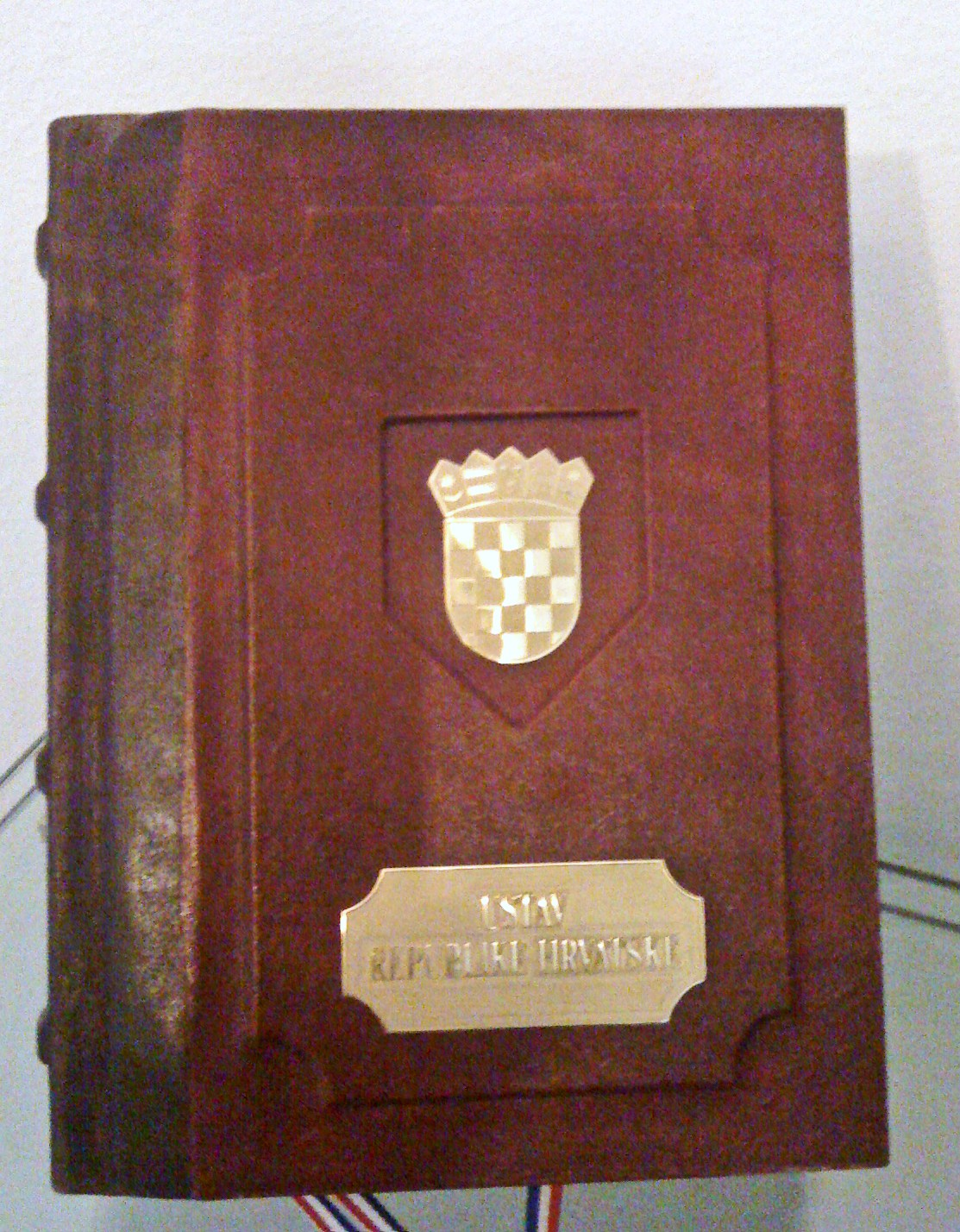
- "Constitution no. 1", which is kept in the great hall of the Palace of the Constitutional Court and is used on the occasion of the presidential inauguration

Overview
- Original title: Ustav Republike Hrvatske
- Jurisdiction: Croatia
- Ratified: 22 December 1990
- Date effective: 22 December 1990
- System: Unitary parliamentary republic

Government structure
- Branches: 3
- Chambers: Unicameral
- Executive: President and Government
- Judiciary: Constitutional Court, Supreme Court

History
- Amendments: 5
- Last amended: 1 December 2013; 12 years ago
- Citation: The Constitution of the Republic Of Croatia (PDF), 15 January 2014
- Location: Palace of the Constitutional Court
- Author: Parliamentary Committee for Constitutional Affairs
- Supersedes: Constitution of the Socialist Republic of Croatia (1974.)

Full text
- Constitution of the Republic of Croatia at Wikisource

The Constitution of the Republic of Croatia (Croatian: Ustav Republike Hrvatske) is the supreme legal act of the Republic of Croatia, serving as the basis for all other legislation.

== History ==
While it was part of the Socialist Federal Republic of Yugoslavia, the Socialist Republic of Croatia had its own Constitution under the Constitution of Yugoslavia.

Following the first multi-party parliamentary elections held in April 1990, the Croatian Parliament made various constitutional changes. On 22 December 1990, they rejected the communist one-party system, adopted a liberal-democratic constitution and dropped the 'Socialist' label from the country's name, becoming the Republic of Croatia. The document is sometimes known as the Christmas Constitution (Božićni ustav).

The Constitution of 1990 used the semi-presidential model of the French Fifth Republic, with broad Presidential executive powers shared with the Government and a bicameral parliament which consisted of the House of Representatives and the House of Counties.

== Contents ==
=== Historical foundations ===
This is the preamble of the Constitution. It explains how the Croats managed to preserve their national identity throughout centuries in various forms of states from the formation of Croatian principalities in 7th century until present days.

The millennial national identity of the Croatian nation and the continuity of its statehood, confirmed by the course of its entire historical experience in various political forms and by the perpetuation and development of a state-building idea grounded on the historical right of the Croatian nation to full sovereignty, have manifested themselves in:

- the formation of Croatian principalities in the seventh century;
- the independent mediaeval state of Croatia established in the ninth century;
- the Kingdom of the Croats established in the tenth century;
- the preservation of the attributes of statehood under the Croatian-Hungarian personal union;
- the independent and sovereign decision of the Croatian Parliament of 1527 to elect a king from the Habsburg dynasty;
- the independent and sovereign decision of the Croatian Parliament to ratify the Pragmatic Sanction in 1712;
- the conclusions of the Croatian Parliament of 1848 regarding the restoration of the integrity of the Triune Kingdom of Croatia under the authority of the ban (viceroy) rooted in the historical, national and natural right of the Croatian nation;
- the Croatian–Hungarian Settlement of 1868 regulating relations between the Kingdom of Dalmatia, Croatia and Slavonia and the Kingdom of Hungary, resting on the legal traditions of both states and the Pragmatic Sanction of 1712;
- the decision of the Croatian Parliament of 29 October 1918 to sever all constitutional ties between Croatia and Austria-Hungary and the simultaneous accession of independent Croatia, invoking its historical and natural national rights, to the State of Slovenes, Croats and Serbs, proclaimed on the former territory of the Habsburg Empire;
- the fact that the Croatian Parliament never ratified the decision made by the National Council of the State of Slovenes, Croats and Serbs to unite with Serbia and Montenegro in the Kingdom of Serbs, Croats and Slovenes (1 December 1918), subsequently proclaimed the Kingdom of Yugoslavia (3 October 1929);
- the establishment of the Banat of Croatia in 1939, which restored Croatian state autonomy within the Kingdom of Yugoslavia;
- the establishment of the foundations of state sovereignty during the course of the Second World War, as expressed in the decision of the Territorial Antifascist Council of the National Liberation of Croatia (1943) in opposition to the proclamation of the Independent State of Croatia (1941), and then in the Constitution of the People's Republic of Croatia (1947) and in all subsequent constitutions of the Socialist Republic of Croatia (1963–1990), at the historic turning point characterised by the rejection of the communist system and changes in the international order in Europe, in the first democratic elections (1990), when the Croatian nation reaffirmed, by its freely expressed will, its millenial statehood;
- the new Constitution of the Republic of Croatia (1990) and the victory of the Croatian nation and Croatia's defenders in the just, legitimate and defensive war of liberation, the Homeland War (1991–1995), wherein the Croatian nation demonstrated its resolve and readiness to establish and preserve the Republic of Croatia as an independent and autonomous, sovereign and democratic state.

Setting forth from these historical facts and the universally accepted principles governing the contemporary world and the inalienable and indivisible, non-transferable and perpetual right of the Croatian nation to self-determination and state sovereignty, including the inviolable right to secession and association as the fundamental conditions for peace and stability of the international order, the Republic of Croatia is hereby established as the nation state of the Croatian nation and the state of the members of its national minorities: Serbs, Czechs, Slovaks, Italians, Hungarians, Jews, Germans, Austrians, Ukrainians, Rusyns, Bosniaks, Slovenians, Montenegrins, Macedonians, Russians, Bulgarians, Poles, Roma, Romanians, Turks, Vlachs, Albanians and others who are its citizens and who are guaranteed equality with citizens of Croatian nationality and the exercise of their national rights in accordance with the democratic norms of the United Nations and the countries of the free world. Respecting the will of the Croatian nation and all citizens so unwaveringly expressed in free elections, the Republic of Croatia is hereby established and shall further develop as a sovereign and democratic state in which equality, freedoms and the rights of man and citizen are guaranteed and secured, and economic and cultural advancement and social welfare are promoted.

=== Basic provisions ===
This chapter defines Croatia as unitary and indivisible democratic and social state in which power derives from the people and belongs to the people as a community of free and equal citizens. The people exercises this power through the election of representatives and through direct decision-making.

Article 3 states that freedom, equal rights, national equality and equality of genders, love of peace, social justice, respect for human rights, inviolability of ownership, conservation of nature and the environment, the rule of law, and a democratic multiparty system are the highest values of the constitutional order of the Republic of Croatia and the ground for interpretation of the Constitution.

Article 4 states that the government shall be organized on the principle of separation of powers into the legislative, executive and judicial branches, but limited by the right to local and regional self-government guaranteed by this Constitution.

Article 12 states that the official language is Croatian in the Latin script and that in some areas, together with the Croatian language and Latin script, other languages, such as Cyrillic or any other legal language can be used.

=== Protection of human rights and fundamental freedoms ===
This chapter deals with general human rights, Personal and Political Freedoms and Rights and Economic, Social and Cultural Rights.

All are equal before the law regardless of race, color, gender, language, religion, political or other belief, national or social origin, property, birth, education, social status or other characteristics.

Article 21 states that every human being has the inalienable right to live, thus there is no capital punishment in the Republic of Croatia. Entrepreneurial and market freedom is the basis of the economic system. In this chapter Croatian National Bank is defined as central bank which is independent in its work of monetary policy making and responsible to the Croatian Parliament.

=== Organization of Government ===
The Croatian Parliament is defined as a representative body of the people and is vested with the legislative power. The most important function of the parliament is to make laws and to amend the Constitution.

The People's Ombudsman, as a commissioner of the Croatian Parliament, shall protect the constitutional and legal rights of citizens in proceedings before the state administration and bodies vested with public authority. He is elected by the parliament for a term of 8 years.

The President of the Republic of Croatia shall represent and stand for the Republic of Croatia at home and abroad. He shall take care of regular and harmonized functioning and stability of the state government and is responsible for the defense of independence and territorial integrity. He is elected directly by the people for a term of 5 years and is limited on 2 mandates maximum. The most important task of the President is to be Commander-in-Chief of the armed forces and to be leader during the state of war when he can issue decrees with the force of law. He is impeachable for any violation of the Constitution. Croatian parliament decides whether to proceed impeaching the President and that is decided by the Constitutional Court.

The Government of the Republic of Croatia exercise executive power. The Government consists of Prime Minister, one or more Deputy Prime Minister and ministers. President of the republic confides the mandate to form the Government to the person who, upon the distribution of the seats in the Croatian Parliament and consultations held, enjoys confidence of the majority of its members. The Government shall assume its duty if the vote of confidence is passed by a majority vote of all members of the Croatian Parliament. The main function of the Government is to propose legislation, to execute laws, guide the foreign and internal policies, direct the state administration and take care of economic development. The Government is responsible to the Croatian parliament and parliament can vote of no confidence when Government resigns.

Judicial power is exercised by independent and autonomous courts. Supreme Court is the highest court and secures uniform application of laws and equal justice to all. The president of the Supreme Court is proposed by the President of the Republic and elected by the Croatian Parliament for a term of 4 years. Judicial office is permanent. Judges are elected by the National Judicial Council. The National Judicial Council consists of 11 members elected by the Croatian Parliament from among notable judges, attorneys-at-law and university professors of law. The majority of members of the National Judicial Council shall be from the ranks of judges.

The State Attorney's Office of the Republic of Croatia is an autonomous and independent judicial body empowered and due to proceed against those who commit criminal and other punishable offences, to undertake legal measures for protection of the property of the Republic of Croatia and to provide legal remedies for protection of the Constitution and law. The Attorney General of the Republic of Croatia shall be appointed by the Croatian Parliament at the proposal of the Government for a term of 4 years.

=== The Constitutional Court of the Republic of Croatia ===
The Constitutional Court is not part of judicial system but the court sui generis. It consists of 13 judges elected by the Croatian parliament for a term of 8 years from among notable jurists, especially judges, public prosecutors, lawyers and university professors of law.

The main function of the Court is to decide on the conformity of laws and other regulation with the Constitution, to decide on jurisdictional disputes between the legislative, executive and judicial branches, to decide on the impeachment of the president of the republic, to supervise and ban political parties and to supervise the constitutionality and legality of elections and national referendums.

The Constitutional Court of the Republic of Croatia shall repeal a law if it finds it to be unconstitutional. When reviewing the legislation, the court often relies on the so-called Croatian constitutional identity and on the Croatian national identity.

=== Local and regional self-government ===
Municipalities and towns are units of local self-government which carries out the affairs of local jurisdiction by which the needs of citizens are directly fulfilled, and in particular the affairs related to the organization of localities and housing, area and urban planning, public utilities, child care, social welfare, primary health services, education and elementary schools, culture, physical education and sports, customer protection, protection and improvement of the environment, fire protection and civil defense.

Counties are units of regional self-government which carries out the affairs of regional significance, and in particular the affairs related to education, health service, area and urban planning, economic development, traffic and traffic infrastructure and the development of network of educational, health, social and cultural institutions.

The capital city of Zagreb may be attributed the status of a county by law.

=== International relations ===
International agreements are concluded depending on the nature and contents of the international agreement, within the authority of the Croatian Parliament, the President of the Republic and the Government of the Republic of Croatia. International agreements which entail the passage of amendment of laws, international agreements of military and political nature, and international agreements which financially commit the Republic of Croatia shall be subject to ratification by the Croatian Parliament. International agreements concluded and ratified in accordance with the Constitution and made public, and which are in force, shall be part of the internal legal order of the Republic of Croatia and shall be above law in terms of legal effects.

Procedure for the association of the Republic of Croatia into alliances with other states may be instituted by at least one-third of the representatives of the Croatian Parliament, the President of the Republic and the Government of the Republic of the Croatia. It is prohibited to initiate any procedure for the association of the Republic of Croatia into alliances with other states if such association leads, or might lead, to a renewal of a South Slav state community or to any Balkan state form of any kind. Any association of the Republic of Croatia shall first be decided upon by the Croatian Parliament by a two-thirds majority vote of all representatives. Any decision concerning the association of the Republic of Croatia shall be made on a referendum by a majority vote of the total number of electors in the State.

The provisions of this Article concerning association shall also relate to the conditions and procedure for the disassociation of the Republic of Croatia.

=== Amending the Constitution ===
Amendments to the Constitution of the Republic of Croatia may be proposed by at least one-fifth of the members of the Croatian Parliament, the President of the Republic, the Government of the Republic of Croatia and by popular initiative, if valid signatures of 10% of the total number of voters are collected.

The decision to amend the Constitution shall be made by a two-thirds majority vote of all the members of the Croatian Parliament. In the case of popular initiative, a referendum is called and the Constitution can be amended even without majority vote in the Parliament.

== Amendments ==
The Constitution of Croatia has been amended 5 times since its ratification in 1990.

=== 1997 amendment ===
On 12 December 1997 the Croatian Parliament adopted several changes to the constitution. These were mostly grammatical corrections but also added the adoption of Croatia's Constitution and Croatia's victory in the War of Independence into the Historical Foundations section. The National Bank of Croatia was renamed into the Croatian National Bank and the President's annual report on the state of the Republic was renamed into the report on the state of the Croatian state and nation. A clause was added to article 135 to prohibit Croatia from entering alliances which would lead to the restoration of Yugoslavia or some Balkan state union in any form. The final section, Transitional And Concluding Provisions, was removed as it was no longer relevant.

The amendment officially came into effect on 15 December 1997.

=== 2000 amendment ===
On 9 November 2000 the House of Representatives of the Croatian National Parliament adopted an amendment to the constitution. This amendment changed Croatia from a semi-presidential republic to a parliamentary republic.

This amendment added gender equality to the list of the highest values of the constitutional order of the Republic of Croatia and made these values the basis for interpreting the Constitution. It was added to article 4 that state power is limited by the constitutional right to local and regional self-government.

Article 6 now said that political parties must publicly disclose the origin of their funds and assets.

Article 7 was amended by adding that the Armed Forces of the Republic of Croatia may cross its borders or operate beyond its borders only with the consent of the House of Representatives of the Croatian Parliament but do not need its consent if they are taking part in military exercises or in a humanitarian action.

It was added to Article 15 that the law may, in addition to the general right to vote, provide members of national minorities with a special right to elect their representatives to the Croatian Parliament and that equality and protection of the rights of national minorities shall be regulated by a constitutional law. It was added to Articles 16 and 17 that any restriction on a freedom or right must be proportionate to the nature of the need for the restriction in each individual case. Article 29 was amended with more rights to a fair trial being added. The right to freely establish and join political parties was removed from Article 43.

The Croatian National Parliament was renamed to the Croatian Parliament. The House of Counties could now have a maximum of 65 members, the president was no longer a life-long member of the House of Counties after finishing his presidency and the president could no longer appoint 5 members of the House while The House of Representatives was given additional responsibilities. The President of a House could now, after obtaining the opinion of the parliamentary party caucuses, convene the House for an extraordinary session. The relationship between the House of Representatives and the House of Counties was slightly altered. A clause was added to Article 92 that the President of an investigative committee is elected by a majority of the members of the House from among the opposition members. The House of Representatives could now be dismissed if it failed to adopt the state budget within 120 days from the date of proposal.

A clause was added that a referendum on a proposal to change the Constitution would be called if requested by ten percent of the total number of voters in the Republic of Croatia.

The president's powers were greatly reduced. He was now required to leave his political party before becoming president and more provisions were added in case of the president's absence or removal from office. He could also no longer appoint and dismiss the Prime Minister or members of the Government, could not appoint and recall heads of diplomatic missions on his own and was no longer able to call for a Government session and preside over the session. He also no longer appointed members of the Defense and National Security Council and now needed the consent of the Prime Minister to use the military during peacetime. He was however given the authority to pass laws at the suggestion of the prime minister when the parliament was unable to convene, no longer needed to give an annual report on the state of the Croatian state and nation to the parliament and was given presidential immunity. He was also given the authority to appoint a provisional non-partisan government before new elections were held if a Government was not constituted in time.

The Prime Minister and members of the Government could no longer perform any other public or professional duties without the consent of the Government and the Government's duties were constitutionally defined.

The process of appointing the President of the Supreme Court was defined and judges were given immunity in accordance with the law. An age limit of 70 years was placed on all judges. The makeup, term limits and appointment system of members of the State Judicial Council were also changed. The powers, responsibilities and appointment process of the State Attorney's Office were defined. The Constitutional Court now had more responsibilities and now had 13 judges instead of 11.

The responsibilities of local governments were defined in Article 129.a. Article 131 now stated that the state is obligated to financially assist weaker local self-government units in accordance with the law.

=== 2001 amendment ===
On 28 March 2001, the House of Representatives of the Croatian Parliament adopted another amendment to the constitution. This amendment abolished the House of Counties, making the Croatian Parliament a unicameral one.

=== 2010 amendment ===
On 16 June 2010, the Croatian Parliament amended the constitution again.

=== 2013 amendment ===
In May 2013, a Catholic group called "On Behalf of the Family" collected 700,000 signatures in favor of an amendment to the Constitution that would define marriage as being a union between a man and a woman. Since the Croatian Constitution states that a referendum on a proposal to change the Constitution will be called if requested by ten percent of the total number of voters, the referendum was approved by Parliament, with 104 out of 151 MPs voting for.

The referendum took place on 1 December 2013 and passed with 66.28% of voters voting for. On 14 January 2014, the Constitutional Court ruled that the referendum was valid and that the amendment to the Constitution took effect on the day of the referendum.

== See also ==
- Constitutional Act on the Constitutional Court of the Republic of Croatia
- Constitutional Act on the Rights of National Minorities in the Republic of Croatia
