= Constitutional Court of Croatia =

Highest court of Croatia in matters of constitutional law

Coordinates: 45°49′00″N 15°58′24″E

Constitutional Court of the Republic of Croatia Ustavni sud Republike Hrvatske
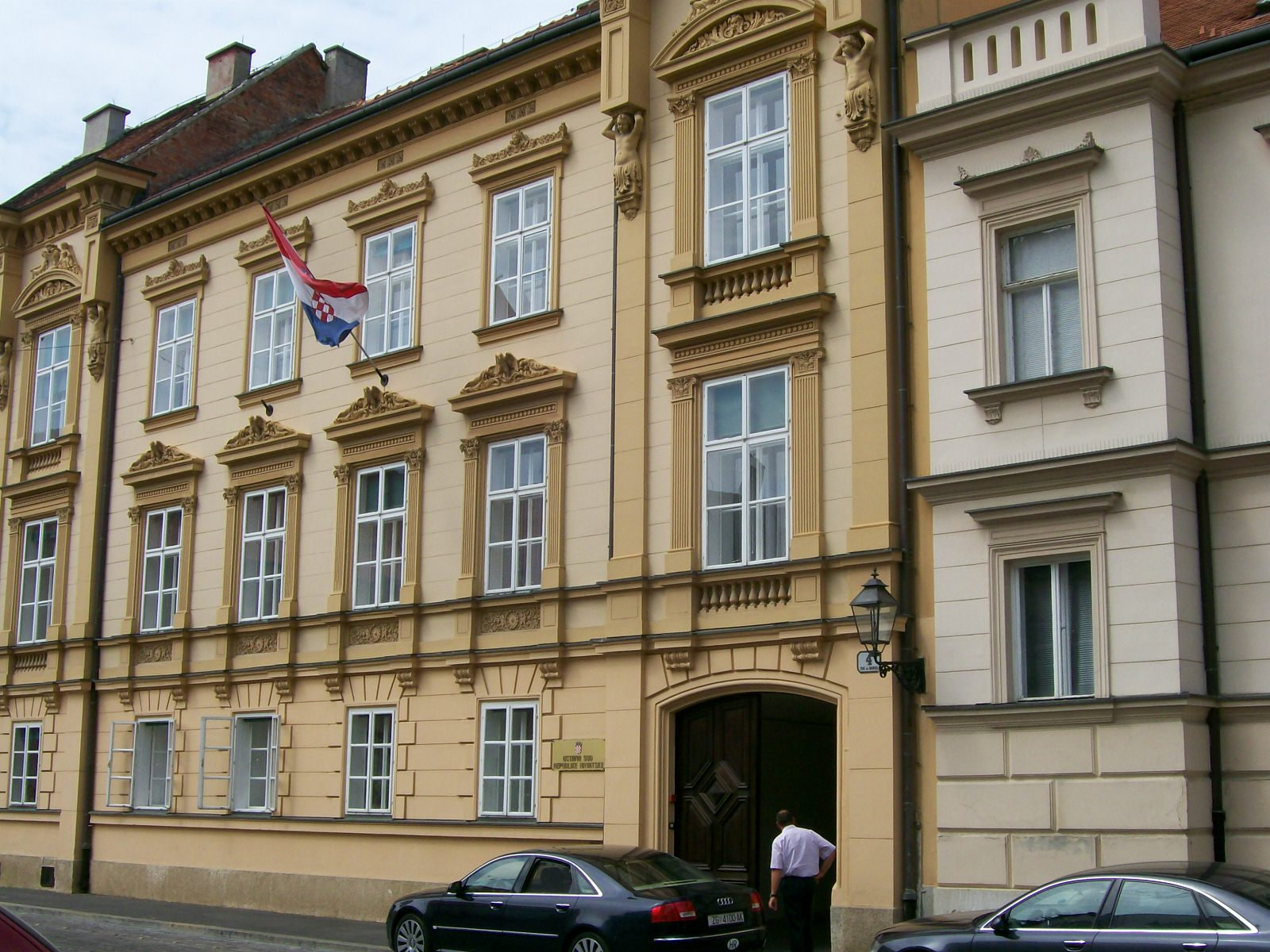
- Facade
- Interactive map of Constitutional Court of the Republic of Croatia; Ustavni sud Republike Hrvatske
- Established: 15 February 1964; 62 years ago (in SR Croatia); 25 July 1990; 36 years ago (in Croatia)
- Jurisdiction: Croatia
- Location: St. Mark's Square, Zagreb
- Composition method: Elected by the Croatian Parliament with qualified majority
- Authorised by: Constitution of the Republic of Croatia
- Judge term length: 8 years (renewable once)
- Number of positions: 13
- Website: usud.hr

President
- Currently: Frane Staničić since 13 October 2025

Vice President
- Currently: Maša Marochini Zrinski since 13 April 2026

The Constitutional Court of the Republic of Croatia (Croatian: Ustavni sud Republike Hrvatske) is an institution that acts as the interpreter and guardian of the Croatian Constitution and which monitors the conformity of laws with the Constitution as well as protection of human rights and freedoms of citizens that are guaranteed by the Constitution. It is considered to be de facto the highest judicial authority because it can overturn Supreme Court decisions on the basis of constitutional breaches. It is not considered as being part of the judicial branch of government, but rather a court sui generis, and it is therefore often colloquially referred to as a "fourth branch of government", alongside the traditional model of tripartite separation of powers into the executive (Government/President of the Republic), legislative (Parliament) and judicial (Supreme Court) branches.

The legal acts that are relevant for the functioning and the internal organisation of the Constitutional Court are the Constitution of Croatia, the Constitutional Act on the Constitutional Court of the Republic of Croatia and the Rules of Procedure of the Constitutional Court.

== Powers and responsibilities ==
According to the Article 125 of the Croatian Constitution, Constitutional Court shall:

- decide upon the compliance of laws with the Constitution,
- decide upon the compliance of other regulations with the Constitution and laws,
- decide on the constitutionality of laws and the constitutionality and legality of other regulations which are no longer valid, provided that less than one year has elapsed from the moment of such cessation until the filing of a request or a proposal to institute proceedings,
- decide on constitutional petitions against individual decisions taken by governmental agencies, bodies of local and regional self-government and legal persons vested with public authority where such decisions violate human rights and fundamental freedoms, as well as the right to local and regional self-government guaranteed by the Constitution of the Republic of Croatia,
- monitor compliance with the Constitution and laws and shall report to the Croatian Parliament on detected violations thereof,
- decide upon jurisdictional disputes between the legislative, executive and judicial branches,
- decide, in conformity with the Constitution, on the impeachment of the President of the Republic,
- supervise compliance of the platforms and activities of political parties with the Constitution and may, in compliance with the Constitution, ban non-compliant parties,
- monitor whether elections and referendums are conducted in compliance with the Constitution and laws and shall resolve electoral disputes falling outside the jurisdiction of the courts,
- first notify the Government what it finds that a competent body charged with enacting a regulation needed for the application of the Constitution, law or other regulation has failed to do so, and shall notify the Croatian Parliament when the Government has been charged with enacting such regulation and failed to do so,
- repeal a law or annul any other regulation if it finds it to be unconstitutional or illegal,
- perform other duties specified by the Constitution.

== Recent influence ==
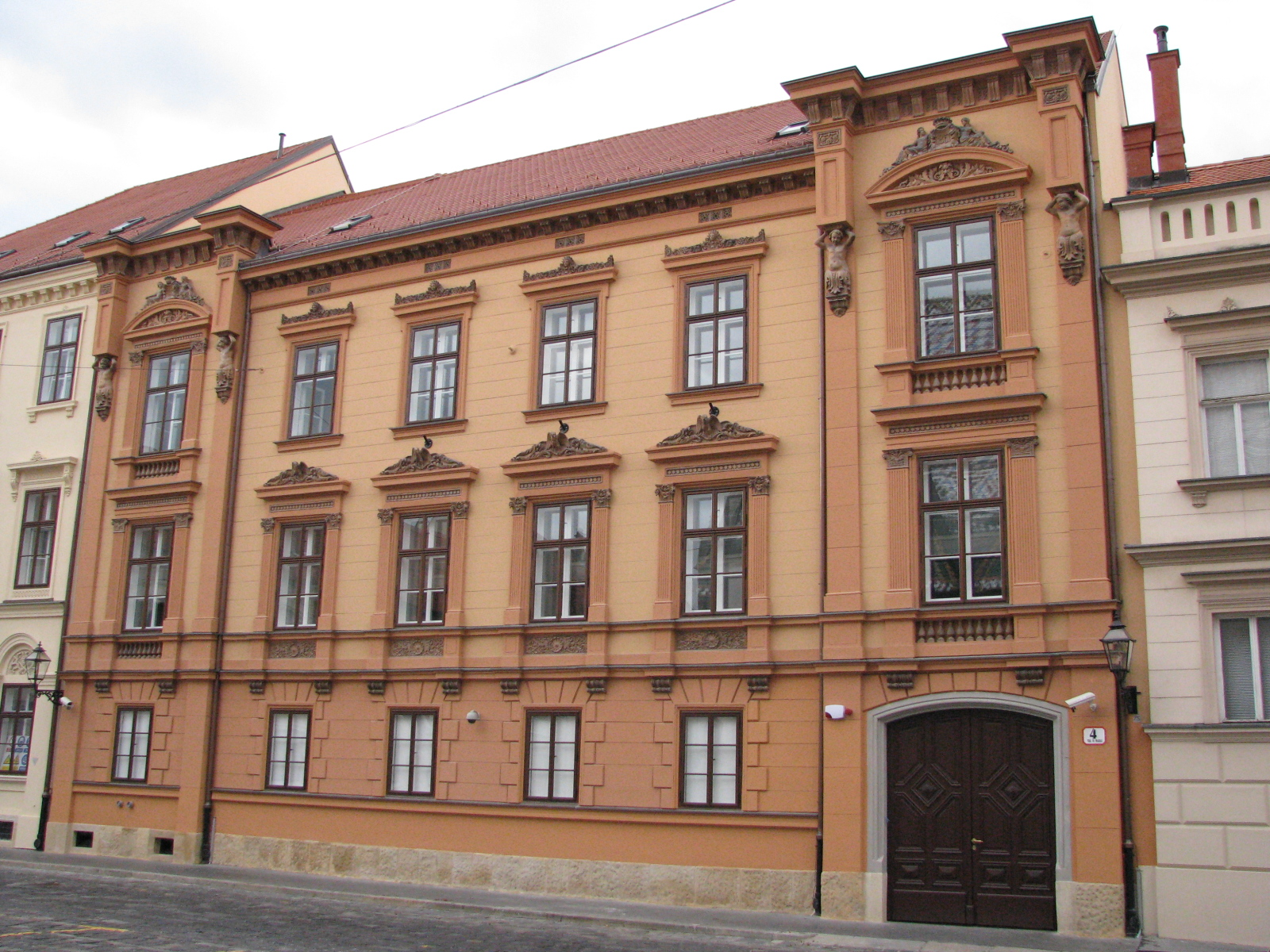
Palace of the Constitutional Court is situated at the St. Mark's Square, Zagreb

=== Right to free gathering ===
Act of Supplements and Alterations to the Law on Public Gathering stipulated that no public gatherings could be held within 100 meters of buildings in which the Croatian Parliament, President of Republic, the Croatian Government or the Constitutional Court are located or are in session (the Parliament, Government and the Court are all located at St. Mark's Square) On 6 July 2011, Constitutional Court ruled that this law, which restricts a Constitutional liberty – the right to free gathering, was not passed by the majority necessary to override the Constitution on that matter. The Court's decision was that the law shall be put out of effect at a date specified by the Court. The Court also provided Parliament with the necessary number of representatives which must confirm the Act to make it legitimate.

=== 2013 referendum and same-sex unions ===
On 14 November 2013, Constitutional Court in a 13–0 statement sent to the State Election Commission stated that there is no constitutional obstacle to hold a 2013 referendum on defining marriage as a union between a man and a woman, in the same time pointing out that the referendum revealed numerous problems in the Referendum law and opened a number of legal questions that required answers. Nevertheless, the Court stressed that decision on the referendum was passed by a majority of 104 MPs and that since it was made with more votes than the majority needed to even change the Constitution itself, the referendum should be held. In addition, the Court asked Croatian Parliament to "provide a stable regulatory framework of the referendum process that meets the standards of a democratic society as soon as possible". The Court also decided that "any amendments to the Constitution which would define marriage as being union between a man and a woman should not have any effect on the further development of the legal framework of the institution of same-sex unions in accordance with the constitutional requirement that everyone in Croatia has the right to be respected and right of legal protection of their personal and family life and human dignity". The Court pointed out that it had never received any request or proposal to review the constitutionality of the provisions of the Family Law that regulated marriage as a union between a man and woman, or provisions of the Law on Same-Sex Unions. The Court therefore considered that the referendum on the definition of marriage is not a referendum on the right to respect for family life, because it is constitutionally guaranteed to all persons, regardless of sex and gender, and is under the direct protection of both, the Constitutional Court itself and the European Court of Human Rights. In conclusion, the Court warned that "incorporation of legal institutes in the constitution shouldn't become a systemic phenomenon" and that exceptional individual cases must be justified by being connected, for example, with deep-rooted social and cultural characteristics of the society.

=== Abortion ===
On 21 February 2017, Constitutional Court announced that it held in a 12–1 decision that it won't accept constitutional complaints submitted by the conservative NGO's Croatian Movement for Life and Family (in 1991) and In the Name of the Family (in 2010) to review conformity of the 1978 Law on Health Measures for the Realization of the Right to Freely Decide on Childbirth with the Constitution. While presenting the decision, Chief Justice Miroslav Šeparović stated that abortion was a controversial and a deep moral, philosophical, legal and medical issue about which there was no consensus and which therefore causes serious divisions in many societies, adding that the question on when life begins was not for the Court since it can only answer questions of legislation. According to Court's decision, it recognized constitutionally guaranteed value of unborn being and not its right to life but rather public interest of the state to protect it. The Court considered that abortion as a constitutional or a human right doesn't exist. According to the Court, the right of privacy of women, which includes the right of freedom, dignity and the protection of family and private life, exists, which gives woman autonomy to a certain period (in Croatia 10 weeks after conception) during which woman can freely decide whether she wants to give birth or not, but after that period of time birth becomes public interest which protects the right to life of the unborn. With this decision, the Court obligated the Croatian Parliament to enact new law within two years and has warned it to take into account the fact that existing law contains certain institutions that no longer exist in the Croatian constitutional order (since the Law is based on the 1974 Yugoslav Constitution) and that the adoption of the 1990 Croatian Constitution built a brand new legal and institutional framework of health, social, scientific and educational system. New law should determine the educational and preventive measures "so that abortion should be an exception". In sole dissenting opinion, Judge Miroslav Šumanović, among other things, stated that the 1978 Law should be formally and substantially aligned with the Constitution, abolished with a deferment effect, that the new one should be enacted, and that it is the duty of the state to protect the right to live of the unborn being. Following Court's decision, the Croatian Parliament is permanently banned from enacting a law which would effectively ban abortion.

=== 2024 Election Ruling ===
In March 2024, the Constitutional Court issued a landmark warning regarding the parliamentary elections. The Court ruled that the sitting President of the Republic, Zoran Milanović, was constitutionally prohibited from being a candidate on any party list or acting as a "prime minister-designate" while still in office. The Court stated that the President's participation in partisan activities would violate the non-partisan nature of the office as defined by Article 96 of the Constitution.

=== 2026 Oversight of Criminal Law Amendments ===
Following the 2024 introduction of the "Unauthorized Disclosure of Investigative Content" (Article 307a of the Criminal Code), the Constitutional Court began reviewing petitions regarding its impact on freedom of expression. In early 2026, the Court stated that any application of the law must respect the European Court of Human Rights standards on "public interest" and the protection of journalists.

== Composition ==
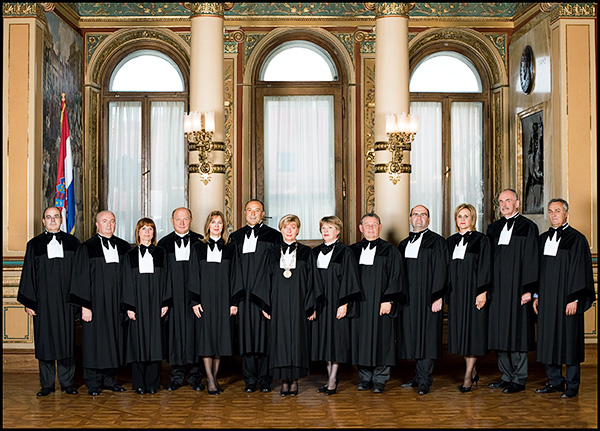
Justices of the Constitutional Court in 2009. From left to right: Mario Jelušić (2008–2024), Ivan Matija (1999–2016), Snježana Bagić (2007–2024), Miroslav Šeparović (2009–2026), Duška Šarin (2008–2016), Aldo Radolović (2007–2016), Jasna Omejec (1999–2016, President of the Court 2008–2016), Nevenka Šernhorst (2002–2011), Mato Arlović (2009–2026), Antun Palarić (2009–2017), Slavica Banić (2008–2016), Davor Krapac (2007–2016), Marko Babić (2007–2016)

The Constitutional Court consists of thirteen judges elected by the Croatian Parliament with qualified majority (101 out of 151) for a term of eight years from among notable jurists, especially judges, public prosecutors, lawyers and university professors of law. The Court elects its own President for a term of four years. Before they take the office, judges must take an oath in front of the President of the Republic.

=== Current composition ===
Following table contains names of sitting justices as of 7 December 2024 when the last appointments occurred.

Position	Portrait	Full name	Term began	Term due to end
President		prof. dr. sc. Frane Staničić	7 December 2024	7 December 2032
Vice President		izv. prof. dr. sc. Maša Marochini Zrinski	7 December 2024	7 December 2032
Justice		Sanja Bezbradica Jelavić	7 December 2024	7 December 2032
Justice		Dražen Bošnjaković	7 December 2024	7 December 2032
Justice		Ante Galić	7 December 2024	7 December 2032
Justice		prof. dr. sc. Biljana Kostadinov	7 December 2024	7 December 2032
Justice		Andrej Abramović	7 December 2024 (7 June 2016)	7 December 2032
Justice		Lovorka Kušan	7 December 2024 (7 June 2016)	7 December 2032
Justice		mr. sc. Rajko Mlinarić	7 December 2024 (7 June 2016)	7 December 2032
Justice		Miroslav Šumanović	7 December 2024 (7 June 2016)	7 December 2032
Justice	seat vacant	-	-	-
Justice	seat vacant	-	-	-
Justice	seat vacant	-	-	-

=== Presidents of the Constitutional Court ===
No.	Portrait	Full name	Took office	Left office	Notes
1		Jadranko Crnić	7 December 1991	6 December 1999	First term (1991–1995).; Second term (1995–1999).; Justice of the Constitutional Court (1991–1999).
2		Smiljko Sokol	7 December 1999	6 December 2003	Served one full term (1999–2003).; Justice of the Constitutional Court (1999–2007).
3		Petar Klarić	7 December 2003	6 December 2007	Served one full term (2003–2007).; Justice of the Constitutional Court (1999–2007).
–		Željko Potočnjak	7 December 2007	12 June 2008	Interim Presiding Justice of the Constitutional Court.; Justice of the Constitutional Court (2001–2009).
4		Jasna Omejec	12 June 2008	7 June 2016	First term (2008–2012).; Second term (2012–2016).; First female President of the Constitutional Court.; Justice of the Constitutional Court (1999–2016).
–		Snježana Bagić	7 June 2016	13 June 2016	Vice President of the Constitutional Court.; Justice of the Constitutional Court (2007–2024).
5		Miroslav Šeparović	13 June 2016	12 October 2025	First term (2016–2017).; Second term (2017–2021).; Third term (2021–2025).; Justice of the Constitutional Court (2009–2026).
6		Frane Staničić	13 October 2025	Incumbent	Serving first term as President.; Justice of the Constitutional Court (since 2024).

=== Former justices ===
This list shows justices and their tenure.

- Mladen Žuvela (1991–1999)
- Ivan Marijan Severinac (1991–1999)
- mr. sc. Hrvoje Momčinović (1991–1999)
- mr. sc. Vojislav Kučeković (1991–1999)
- Ante Jelavić Mitrović (1991–1999)
- prof. dr. sc. Nikola Filipović (1991–1999)
- Zdravko Bartovčak (1991–1999)
- Milan Vuković (1991–1992, 1995–1997, 1999–2007)
- doc. dr. sc. Velimir Belajec (1994–2001)
- Jurica Malčić (1994–2002)
- Vice Vukojević (1999–2007)
- Emilija Rajić (1999–2007)
- Ivan Mrkonjić (1999–2007)
- dr. sc. Ivan Matija (1999–2007, 2007–2016)
- Marijan Hranjski (1999–2007)
- Agata Račan (2001–2009)
- prof. dr. sc. Željko Potočnjak (2001–2009)
- Mario Kos (2001–2009)
- mr. sc. Nevenka Šernhorst (2002–2011)
- dr. sc. Aldo Radolović (2007–2016)
- akademik Davor Krapac (2007–2016)
- dr. sc. Snježana Bagić (2007–2016, 2016–2024)
- dr. sc. Marko Babić (2007–2016)
- dr. sc. Duška Šarin (2008–2016)
- doc. dr. sc. Mario Jelušić (2008–2016, 2016–2024)
- Slavica Banić (2008–2016)
- Antun Palarić (2009–2017)
- dr. sc. Mato Arlović (2009–2017, 2017–2026)
- Davorin Mlakar (2016–2024)
- Josip Leko (2016–2024)
- dr. sc. Branko Brkić (2016–2024)
- Ingrid Antičević-Martinović (2016–2024)
- dr. sc. Goran Selanec (2017–2026)

== See also ==
- Constitution
- Constitutionalism
- Constitutional economics
- Jurisprudence
- Rule of law
- Judiciary
- Rule of law
- Rule According to Higher Law

== Sources ==
- History of Croatian Constitutional Judicature
- Sanja Barić, "The Transformative Role of the Constitutional Court of the Republic of Croatia - From the ex-Yu to the EU", Analitika - Center for Social Research, Sarajevo, 2016
