= Flag of Serbs of Croatia =

Ethnic flag

Flag of Serbs in Croatia
- "Tricolour" (Тробојка / Trobojka)
- Use: Ethnic flag
- Proportion: 1:2
- Adopted: 2005; 1997 (regionally in Eastern Slavonia by the Joint Council of Municipalities)
- Design: Horizontal tricolour of red, blue, and white
- Designed by: Serb National Council

The flag of the Serbs of Croatia is the ethnic flag of the Serbs of Croatia. It was introduced as the official symbol on 9 April 2005 by the decision of the Serb National Council (body of self-government of the Serbs of Croatia in matters regarding civil rights and cultural identity) with prior consent of the Council for Ethnic Minorities of the Republic of Croatia. At the time of the statewide introduction, the flag was already officially used in Eastern Slavonia since the 14 November 1997 decision of the Joint Council of Municipalities, made at the final stage of the UNTAES deployment in the region.

The flag of Serbs of Croatia is virtually identical to the civil flag of Serbia and the flag of Republika Srpska, differing only in very subtle color shades of red and blue. The flag was handed over to representatives of Serbian minority in Croatia by the Ambassador of Serbia to Croatia on 8 July 2005 at the ceremony organized to mark the occasion of the introduction of the flag, thereby giving it additional legitimacy in the Serb community.

== Flag protocol ==
The flag protocol is prescribed by the Serb National Council's Decision on the Flag of the Serbian Ethnic Minority in Croatia. The flag should be used in accordance with the decision and in a way that emphasize dignity and honor of the Serb people. The flag is prohibited to stand in dilapidated, untidy, torn or in any other way damaged state.

== Historical flags ==
SAO Krajina
(1990–1991)
SAO Western Slavonia (1990–1991)
SAO Eastern Slavonia (1991–1992)

Flag of the Republic of Serbian Krajina
(1991–1995)

Flag of Eastern Slavonia (1995–1998)

== Gallery ==
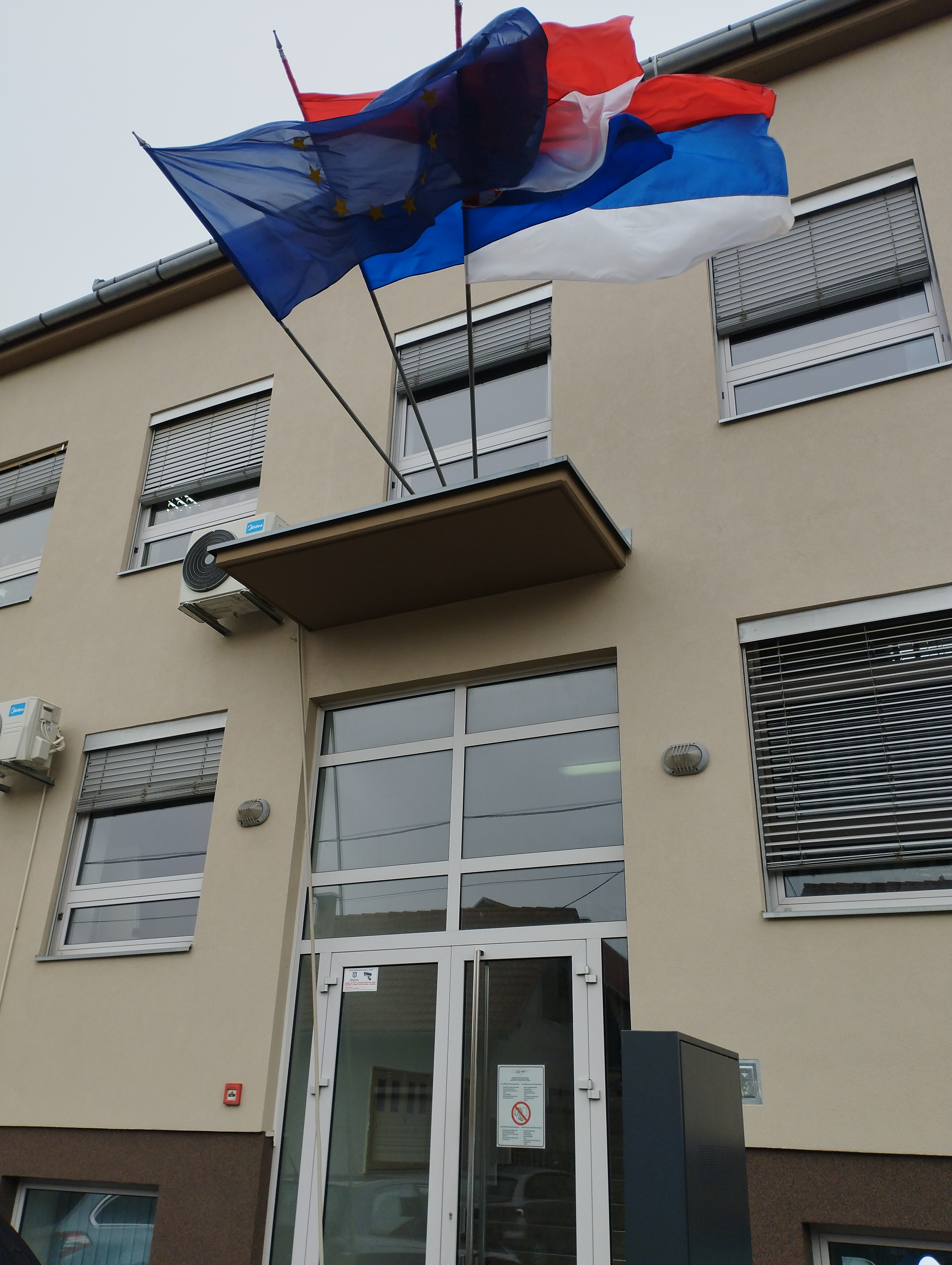
Flag at the seat of the Joint Council of Municipalities in Vukovar

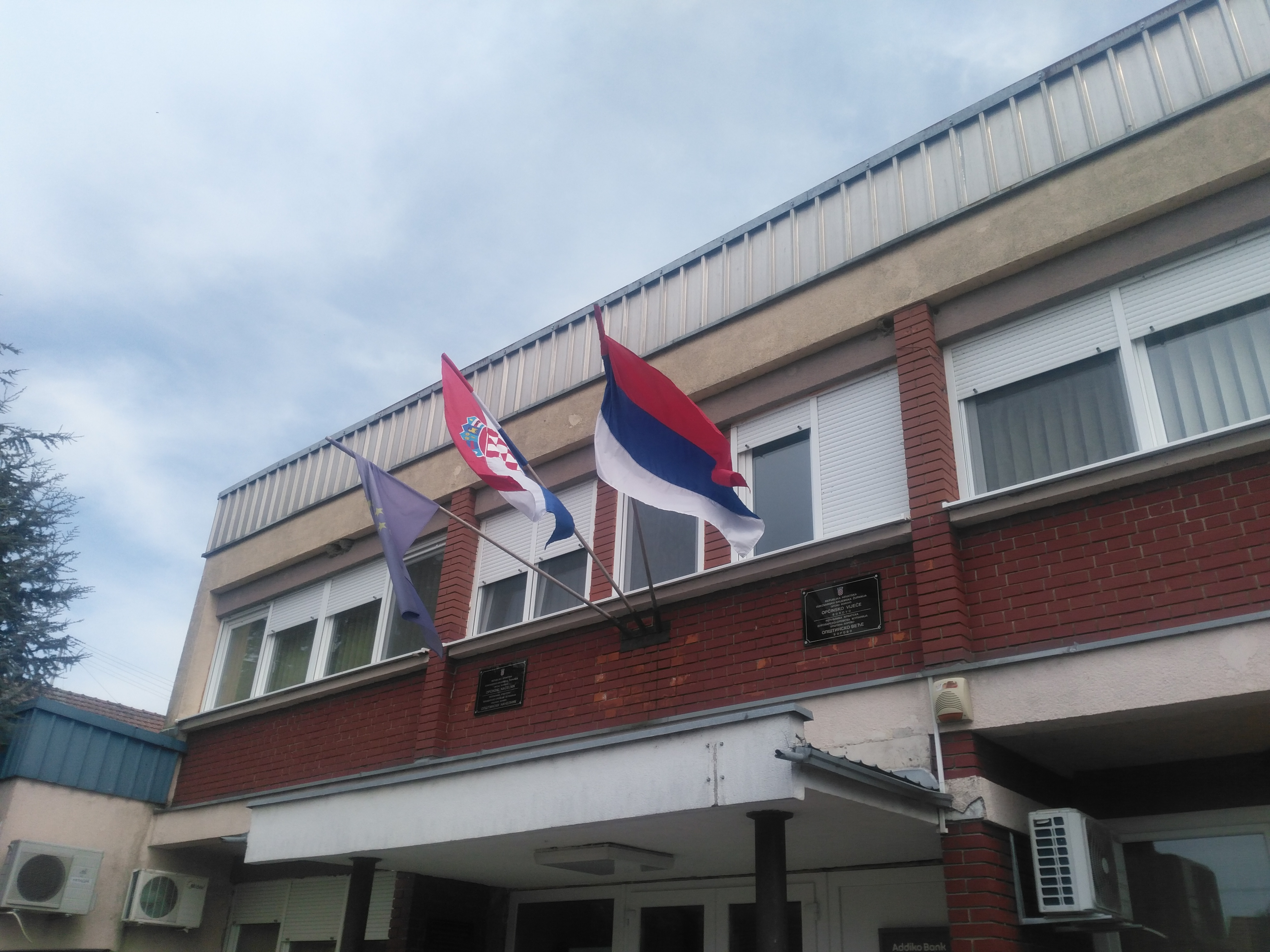
Flag on the Borovo Municipality building

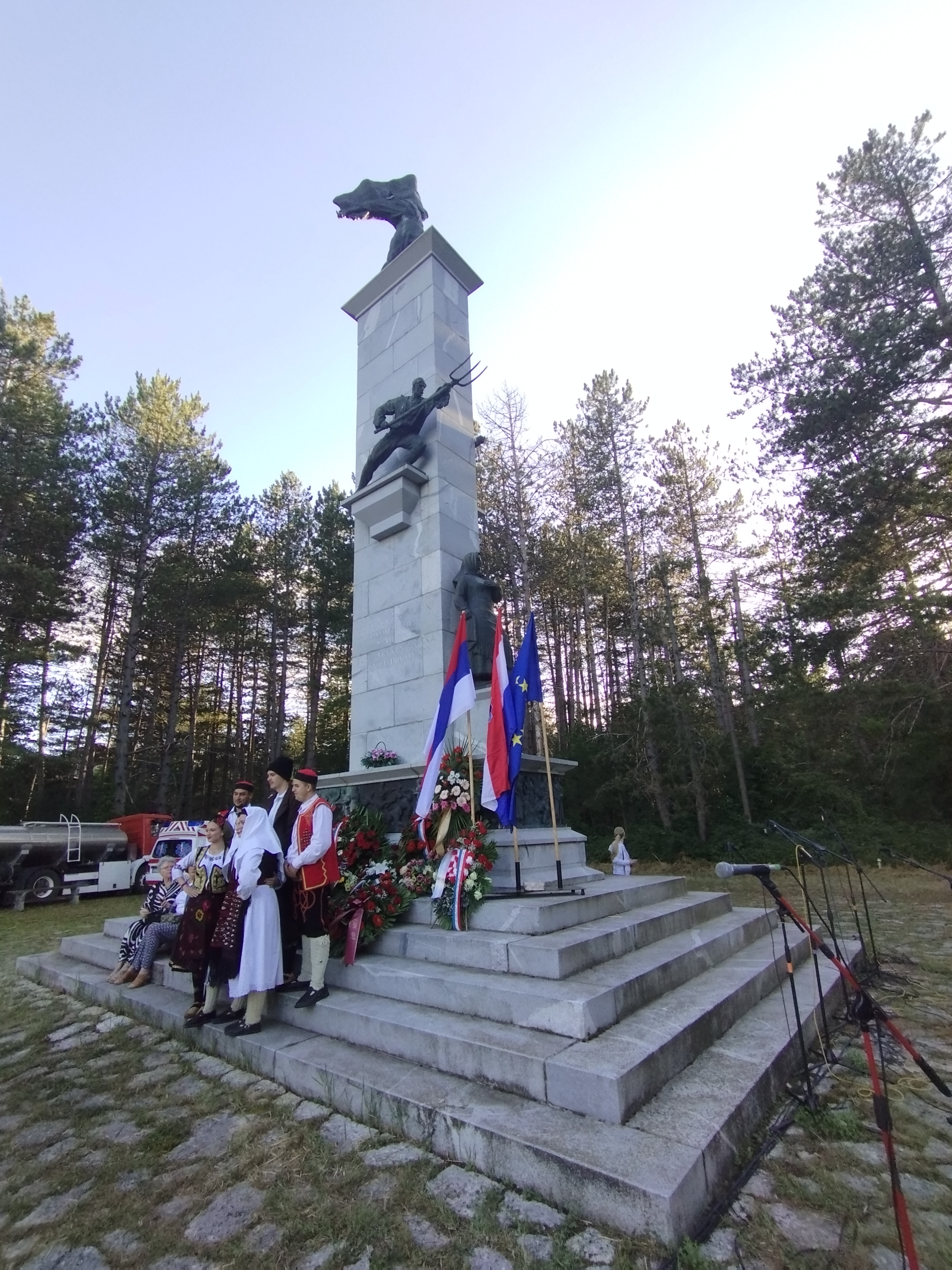
Flag during the 2025 commemoration of the Srb uprising in Srb

== See also ==
- Serbs of Croatia
- List of Serbian flags
