= Dragan Crnogorac =

Dragan Crnogorac may refer to:

- Dragan Crnogorac (war criminal), Bosnian Serb war criminal
- Dragan Crnogorac (politician) (born 1978), Croatian Serb politician
