= List of ambassadors of Serbia to Croatia =

List of Serbian ambassadors to Croatia

Ambassador of Serbia to Croatia
- Амбасадор Србије у Хрватској
- Greater coat of arms of Serbia
- Incumbent; Jelena Milić since 2022
- Ministry of Foreign Affairs
- Style: His Excellency
- Residence: Zagreb, Croatia
- Nominator: Government
- Appointer: President of the Republic
- Term length: At the pleasure of the president of the Republic
- Inaugural holder: Veljko Knežević
- Formation: 1997

The ambassador of Serbia to Croatia is the official diplomatic representative of the Republic of Serbia to the Republic of Croatia. The ambassador leads the Serbian diplomatic mission and is responsible for managing and strengthening the bilateral relations between the two neighbouring countries.

== List of representatives ==
Ambassadors of the Federal Republic of Yugoslavia

- 1997–1999: Veljko Knežević
- 1999–2001: Vladimir Ćurguz (chargé d'affaires)
- 2001–2003: Milan Simurdić

Ambassadors of the State Union of Serbia and Montenegro

- 2003–2005: Milan Simurdić
- 2005–2006: Radivoj Cvjetićanin

Ambassadors of the Republic of Serbia

- 2006–2009: Radivoj Cvjetićanin
- 2009–2013: Stanimir Vukićević
- 2013–2015: Bosa Prodanović (chargé d'affaires)
- 2015–2020: Mira Nikolić
- 2020–2022: Davor Trkulja (chargé d'affaires)
- 2022: Jelena Surla (chargé d'affaires)
- 2022–2025: Jelena Milić

== See also ==
- Croatia–Serbia relations
- Foreign relations of Serbia
