= Jelena Milić =

Serbian engineer and political analyst

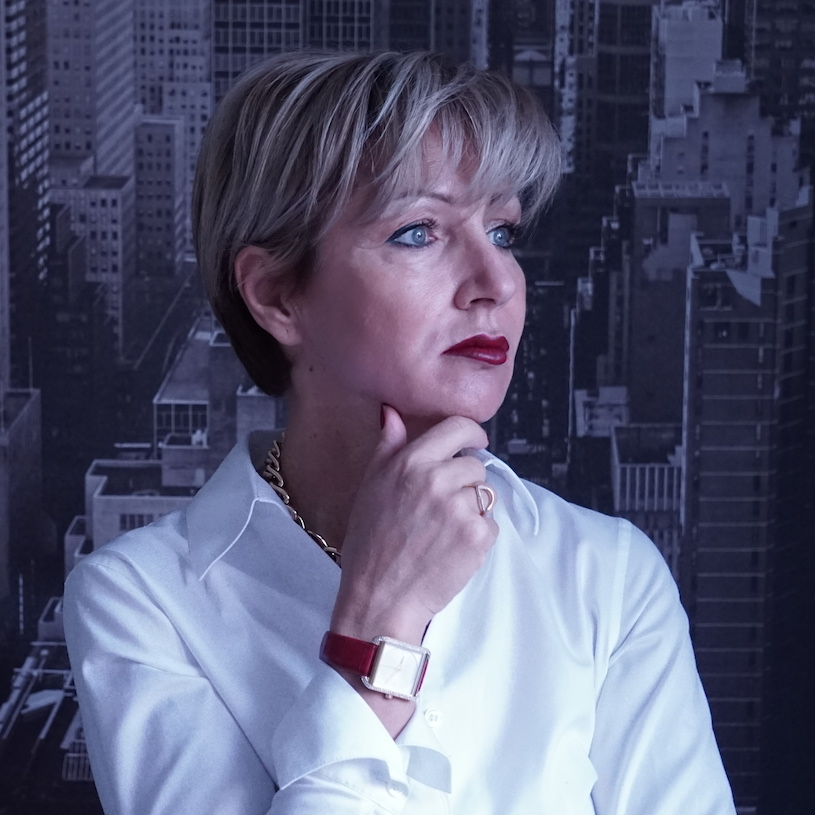

Personal details
- Born: 15 January 1965 (age 61) Belgrade, SR Serbia, Yugoslavia (now Serbia)

Jelena Milić (Serbian Cyrillic: Јелена Милић; born 15 January 1965) is a Serbian political analyst and diplomat. Milić was the Serbian ambassador to Croatia from 2022 until March 2025, and founder of the Center for Euro-Atlantic Studies (CEAS), a Belgrade-based think tank.

== Education ==
Milić received a degree in Engineering and Security Management and obtained her master's degree in the same field of study in 2020 from the UNION-Nikola Tesla University in Belgrade. She is also an alumna of the International Academy for Leadership Friedrich-Naumann-Stiftung (IAF) and has obtained a fellowship at Paris based Research center CERI at Sciences Po University.

== Career ==
In the late 1990s she took part in a non-violent student-led movement, OTPOR (Resistance), which significantly contributed to the defeat of the Serbian leader Slobodan Milosevic. Milić worked as a producer in a documentary about the movement entitled "Obaranje Diktatora" (Bringing Down a Dictator), which is part of the original series "A Force More Powerful", a project of the US broadcaster PBS, supported by the American Institute for peace and Albert Einstein Organization.

In the mid-2000s, she was Goran Svilanović's secretary when he was employed by the Stability Pact for South East Europe Department for democracy and human rights. Earlier, she worked as a political analyst and researcher for the International Crisis Group, Helsinki Committee for Human Rights in Serbia and as a repatriation officer of UNHCR.

In 2007, Milić founded the Center for Euro-Atlantic Studies (CEAS), a think tank based in Belgrade. Since its inception, CEAS monitored and analyzed trends in liberal Western democracies and advocated Serbian full and active membership in the European Union and NATO. It ceased operations in 2021.

Milić is endorsed as a regional expert in the DisinfoPortal, project of the US Atlantic Council, whereas the organization under her leadership, CEAS is the only regional organization among other 22 organizations, all partners in this project. The scope of work of CEAS covers issues relevant to Serbia's process towards fortifying liberal democratic institutions and becoming a respected actor in the international communality through the EU and NATO membership, therefore its aim as an NGO is to promote the EU and NATO alliance and their values, while attracting great media attention.

She is an influential political analyst in Serbia and in the region of the Western Balkans. In 2017, Jelena Milić was designated as part of POLITICO's class, a list of 28 most influential people.

On 16 March 2022, Milić was named as Serbia's ambassador to Croatia.

== Work and publications ==
=== Selected policy and research papers ===
- "Eyes Wide Shut: Strengthening of the Russian Soft Power in Serbia – goals, instruments and effects"
- "Basic instinct: The Case for more NATO in the Western Balkans"
- "West Side Story: CEAS proposal for the correction of the administrative line between Serbia and Kosovo, agreed in a format under the auspices of West"
- "The Elephant in the Room: Incomplete Security Sector Reform in Serbia and its Consequences for Serbian Domestic and Foreign Policies"
- "In a Snake's Nest"
- "The Terror-Stricken Will"
- "Why a public debate on Serbia's NATO membership is needed"
- "Sad Stream"

Her analysis articles have been also published in well-known journals such as The National Interest, The Diplomat, and The Center for European Policy Analysis (CEPA). In addition to regular articles, interviews and blogs for local and regional media, she is frequently quoted by foreign media as well, such as Märkische Oderzeitung, Handelsblatt, Spiegel and New Eastern Europe, a bimonthly magazine on Central and Eastern European relations.

Milić is working as a columnist as well, and maintains OP/ED column in a leading Serbian newspaper Danas and a blog on Blic, an online portal in Serbia. Likewise, she writes columns for Al Jazeera Balkans.
