= Jagodnjak =

Jagodnjak Јагодњак (Serbian)
- Municipality
- Municipality of Jagodnjak; Općina Jagodnjak; Општина Јагодњак
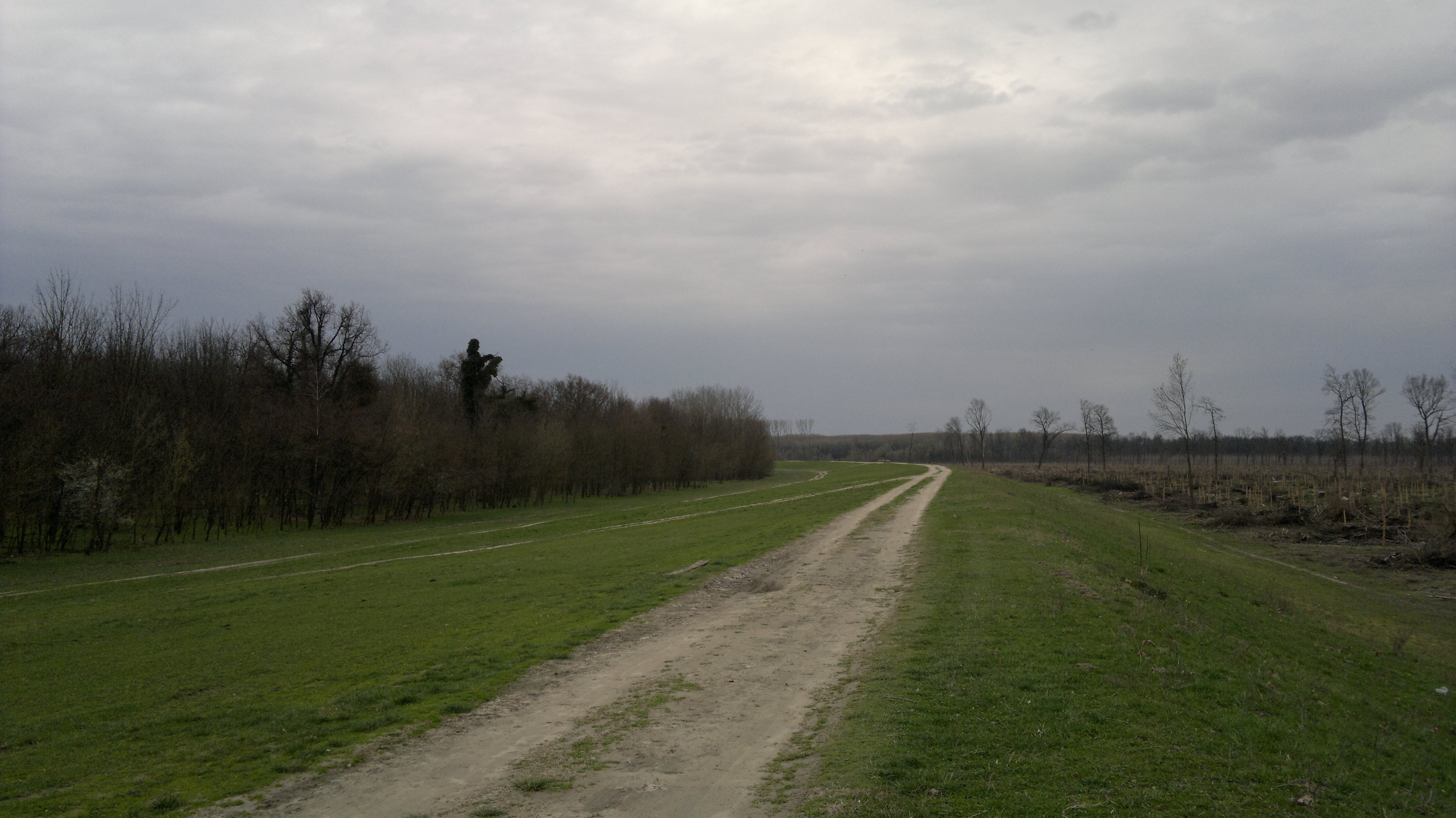
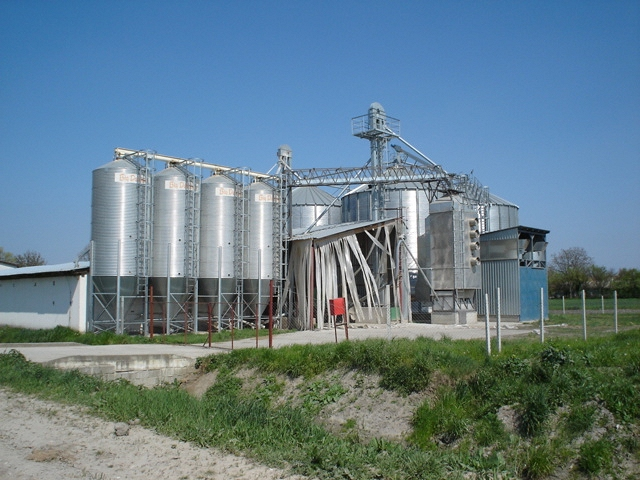
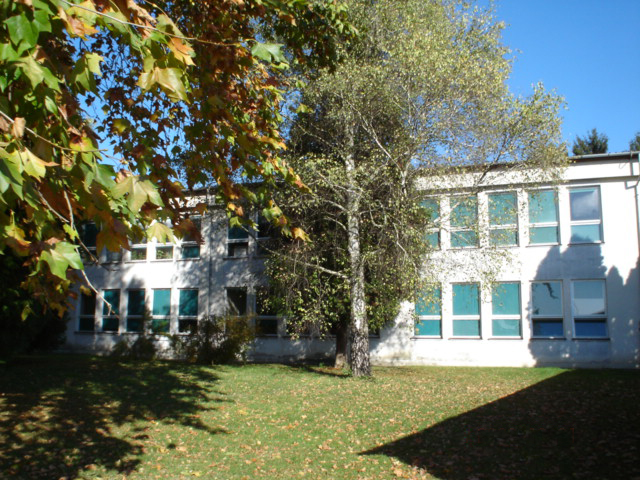
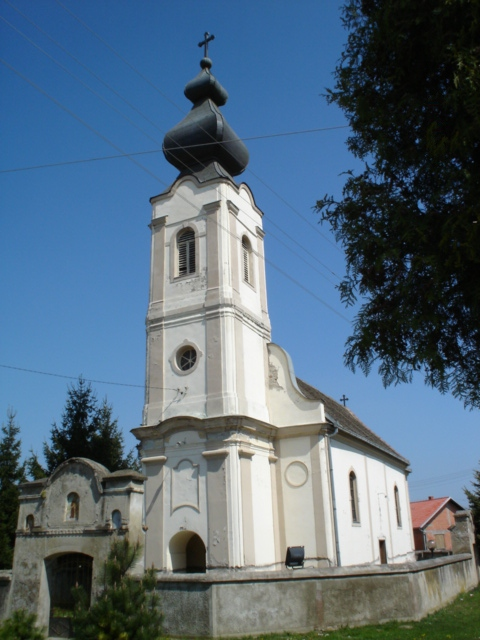
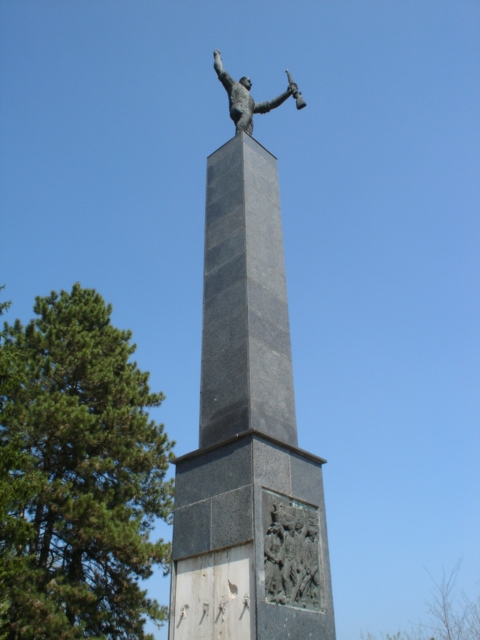
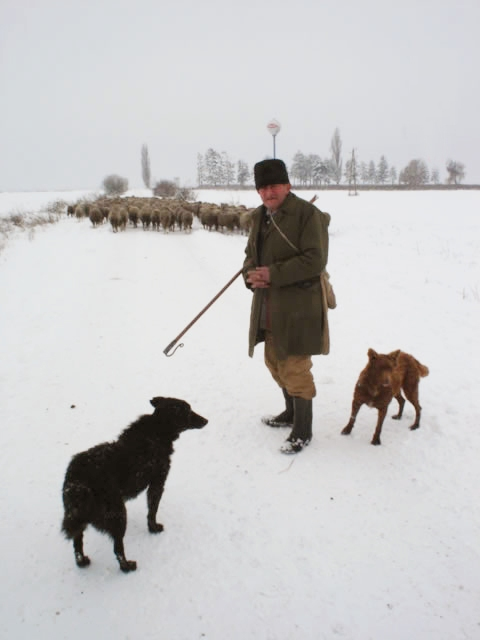
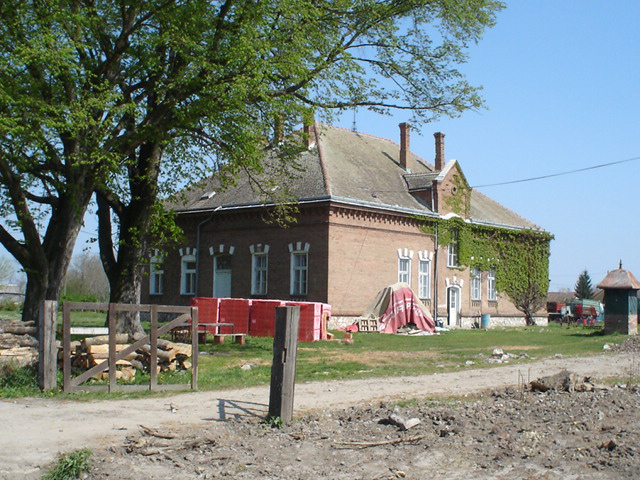
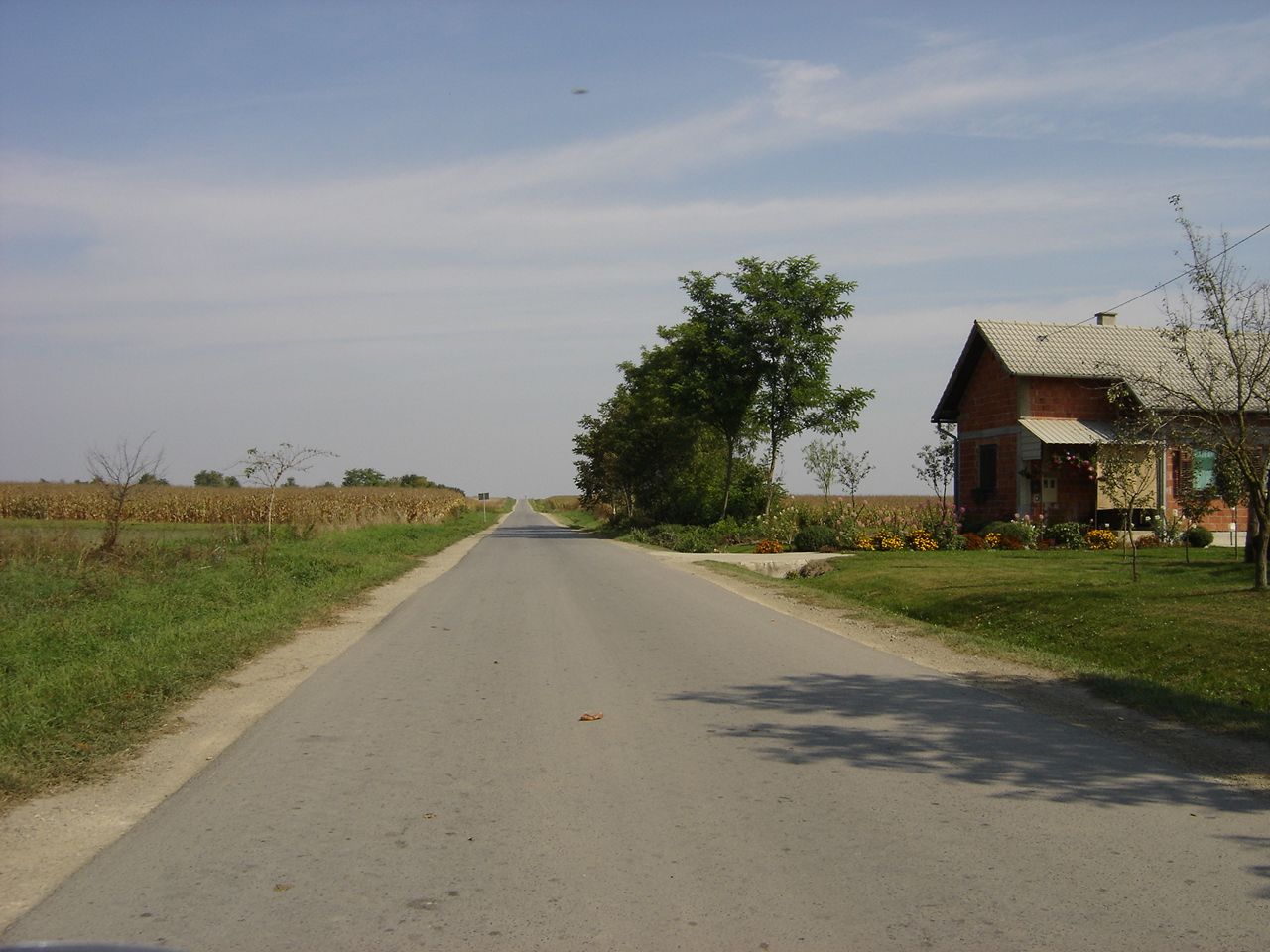
- Villages of the Jagodnjak Municipality

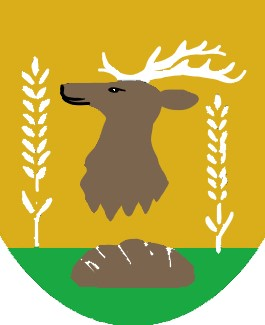
- Coat of arms

- Location of Jagodnjak in Croatia Jagodnjak (Croatia) Jagodnjak (Europe)
- Coordinates: 45°42′N 18°35′E
- Country: Croatia
- Region: Baranja (Podunavlje)
- County: Osijek-Baranja County

Government
  - Municipal mayor: Anđelko Balaban (HNS–LD)

Area
  - Municipality: 102.5 km^{2} (39.6 sq mi)
  - Urban: 59.2 km^{2} (22.9 sq mi)

Population (2021)
  - Municipality: 1,500
  - Density: 15/km^{2} (38/sq mi)
  - Urban: 990
  - Urban density: 17/km^{2} (43/sq mi)
- Time zone: UTC+1 (CET)
  - Summer (DST): UTC+2 (CEST)
- Postal codes: 31323 Bolman; 31324 Jagodnjak
- Area code: +031
- Official languages: Croatian, Serbian
- Website: jagodnjak.hr

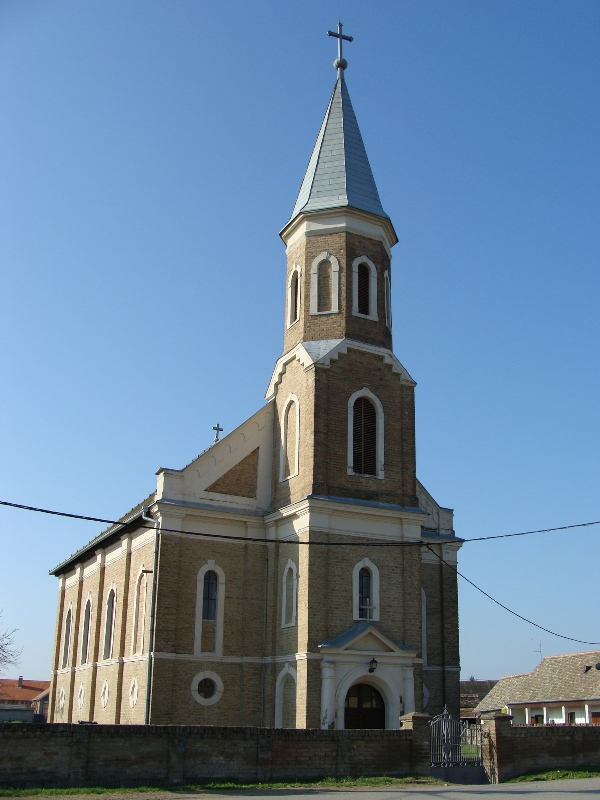
Roman Catholic Church in Jagodnjak

Jagodnjak ((Croatian and Serbian pronunciation: [jâɡodɲaːk]) Serbian Cyrillic: Јагодњак, Hungarian: Kácsfalu, German: Katschfeld) is a village and a municipality in the Osijek-Baranja County, Croatia. Landscape of the Jagodnjak Municipality is marked by the Drava river with surrounding wetland forest and by Pannonian Basin plains with agricultural fields of wheat, common sunflower, maize and sugar beet.

Jagodnjak is an underdeveloped municipality which is statistically classified as the First Category Area of Special State Concern by the Government of Croatia.

== Name ==
Jagodnjak name is derived from the Slavic word "jagoda" ("strawberry" in English), "jagodnjak" = "strawberry bed(s)/plot(s)/patch(es)/garden". In other languages, the village in German is known as Katschfeld and in Hungarian as Kácsfalu and is written as Јагодњак in Serbian Cyrillic.

== Geography ==
Today's Jagodnjak settlement also includes hamlets that mostly no longer exist: Bajmok, Bikaš, Brešće, Brod, Brod-Pustara, Čemin, Deonice, Grablje, Karaš, Mali Jagodnjak, Milina, Pjeskovi, Projina Međa, Rit, Staro Selo, Šakarine, Trbićeva Ada i Zornice.

The municipality of Jagodnjak includes the following settlements:

- Bolman
- Jagodnjak
- Majške Međe
- Novi Bolman

Colonist settlement of Majške Međe was established on the territory of the then Bolman nicipality during the land reform in interwar Yugoslavia.

== History ==
The first historical Municipality of Jagodnjak was established before the World War II during the epoch of the Kingdom of Hungary, and was settled by Danube Swabians from Hesse, they were called Stifolder. At that time the municipality was part of the Baranya County (former) and did not include villages of Bolman, Novi Bolman and Majške Međe which constituted a separate unit called the Municipality of Bolman.

Until the end of World War II, the inhabitants were Danube Swabians. The former German settlers were expelled to Germany and Austria in 1945-1948, following the Potsdam Agreement.

During the final stage of the World War II in March 1945 the village of Bolman was the spot of the Battle of Bolman in which Yugoslav Partisans (primarily multi-ethnic units from Vojvodina) and Red Army fought against Nazis. The monument to the battle was constructed in 1951 and in 1971 it was protected as a registered cultural heritage site. After the integration of the region under the central government rule in the late 1990s the monument to the battle was devastated in 1999 and 2000. The municipality initiated reconstruction efforts in 2002 and the work was not completed until 2013 when the Ministry of Culture of the Republic of Croatia provided funds for this purpose. The monument is allegedly target of intentional desecration with illegal waste disposal.

Modern day Municipality of Jagodnjak was established in 1998 with the support of the United Nations representatives in the final stage of the UNTAES transitional administration over the region of Eastern Slavonia, Baranja and Western Syrmia. It was created in order to ensure adequate Serb local self-government through the creation of municipalities in Eastern Slavonia in which the group constitute ethnic majority. Today Jagodnjak is only municipality in Croatian part of Baranya with an ethnic Serb majority. Together with other municipalities with Serb majority in Eastern Croatia it constitutes the Joint Council of Municipalities.

== Demographics ==
=== Population ===
There are 2,537 inhabitants in the municipality (2001 census), including:

- Serbs (64.72%)
- Croats (26.65%)
- Hungarians (2.88%)
- Romani (1.18%)

Before World War II there was a substantial Danube Swabian minority here but they were all expelled by the Communist regime of Josip Broz Tito after 1945.

=== Languages ===
Due to the local minority population, the Jagodnjak municipality prescribe the use of not only Croatian as the official language, but the Serbian language and Serbian Cyrillic alphabet as well. As of 2023, the legal requirements for the fulfillment of bilingual standards have only been partly carried out. Official buildings do have Cyrillic signage, as do street signs, but not traffic signs or seals. Cyrillic is only used on a few official documents. There are no public legal and administrative employees proficient in the script. Preserving traditional Serbian place names and assigning street names to Serbian historical figures is legally mandated, but not carried out.

== Politics ==
=== Joint Council of Municipalities ===
The Municipality of Jagodnjak is one of seven Serb majority member municipalities within the Joint Council of Municipalities, inter-municipal sui generis organization of ethnic Serb community in eastern Croatia established on the basis of Erdut Agreement. As Serb community constitute majority of the population of the municipality it is represented by 2 delegated Councillors at the Assembly of the Joint Council of Municipalities, double the number of Councilors to the number from Serb minority municipalities in Eastern Croatia.

=== Minority councils ===
Directly elected minority councils and representatives are tasked with consulting tasks for the local or regional authorities in which they are advocating for minority rights and interests, integration into public life and participation in the management of local affairs. At the 2023 Croatian national minorities councils and representatives elections Hungarians, Roma and Serbs of Croatia each fulfilled legal requirements to elect 10 members municipal minority councils of the Jagodnjak Municipality.

== Notable natives and residents ==
- József Angster
- Maja Dombi

== See also ==
- Osijek-Baranja County
- Baranja
- Joint Council of Municipalities
- Church of St Nicholas, Jagodnjak
- List of Croatian municipalities with minority languages in official use
