= Church of Sts. Peter and Paul, Bolman =

Serbian Orthodox church in Bolman, Croatia

Church of Sts. Peter and Paul
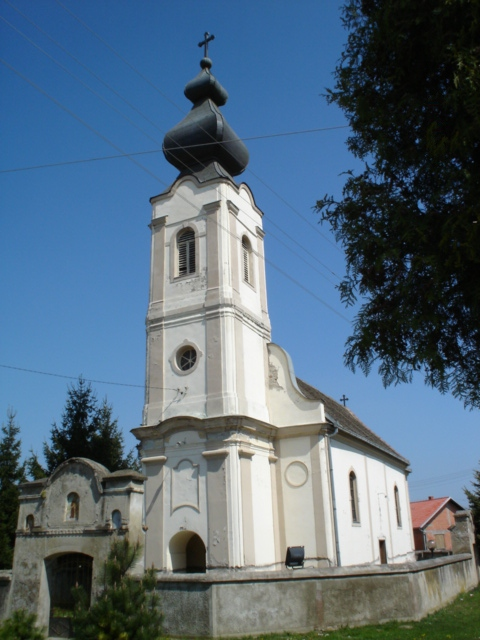
- Church of Sts. Peter and Paul
- 45°42′19″N 18°29′7″E
- Location: Bolman
- Country: Croatia
- Denomination: Serbian Orthodox

History
- Dedication: Saint Peter and Paul the Apostle
- Consecrated: 1777

Architecture
- Style: Baroque and Classicism

Administration
- Archdiocese: Eparchy of Osijek Plain and Baranya

Church of Sts. Peter and Paul (Croatian: Crkva svetih Petra i Pavla, Serbian Cyrillic: Црква Светих Петра и Павла) in Bolman is a Serbian Orthodox church in eastern Croatia. The church is dedicated to St. Peter and Paul.

The church is listed in the Register of Cultural Goods of Croatia.

== See also ==
- List of Serbian Orthodox churches in Croatia
- Eparchy of Osijek Plain and Baranya
- Serbs of Croatia
