= Novi Bolman =

Novi Bolman Нови Болман (Serbian)
- Village (Selo)
- Location within Osijek-Baranja County Location within Croatia Location within Europe
- Coordinates: 45.725°N 18.54°E
- Country: Croatia
- County: Osijek-Baranja
- Municipality: Jagodnjak

Government
  - Body: Local Committee

Area
  - Total: 6.2 km^{2} (2.4 sq mi)

Population (2021)
  - Total: 83
  - Density: 13/km^{2} (35/sq mi)
- Time zone: UTC+1 (CET)
  - Summer (DST): UTC+2 (CEST)
- Official languages: Croatian, Serbian

Novi Bolman (Hungarian: Újbolmány; Serbian Cyrillic: Нови Болман) is a settlement in the region of Baranja, Croatia. Administratively, it is located in the Jagodnjak municipality within the Osijek-Baranja County. Population is 122 people.

== See also ==
- Jagodnjak Municipality
- Osijek-Baranja County
- Baranja
