= Bolman =

Bolman Болман (Serbian)
- Village (Selo)
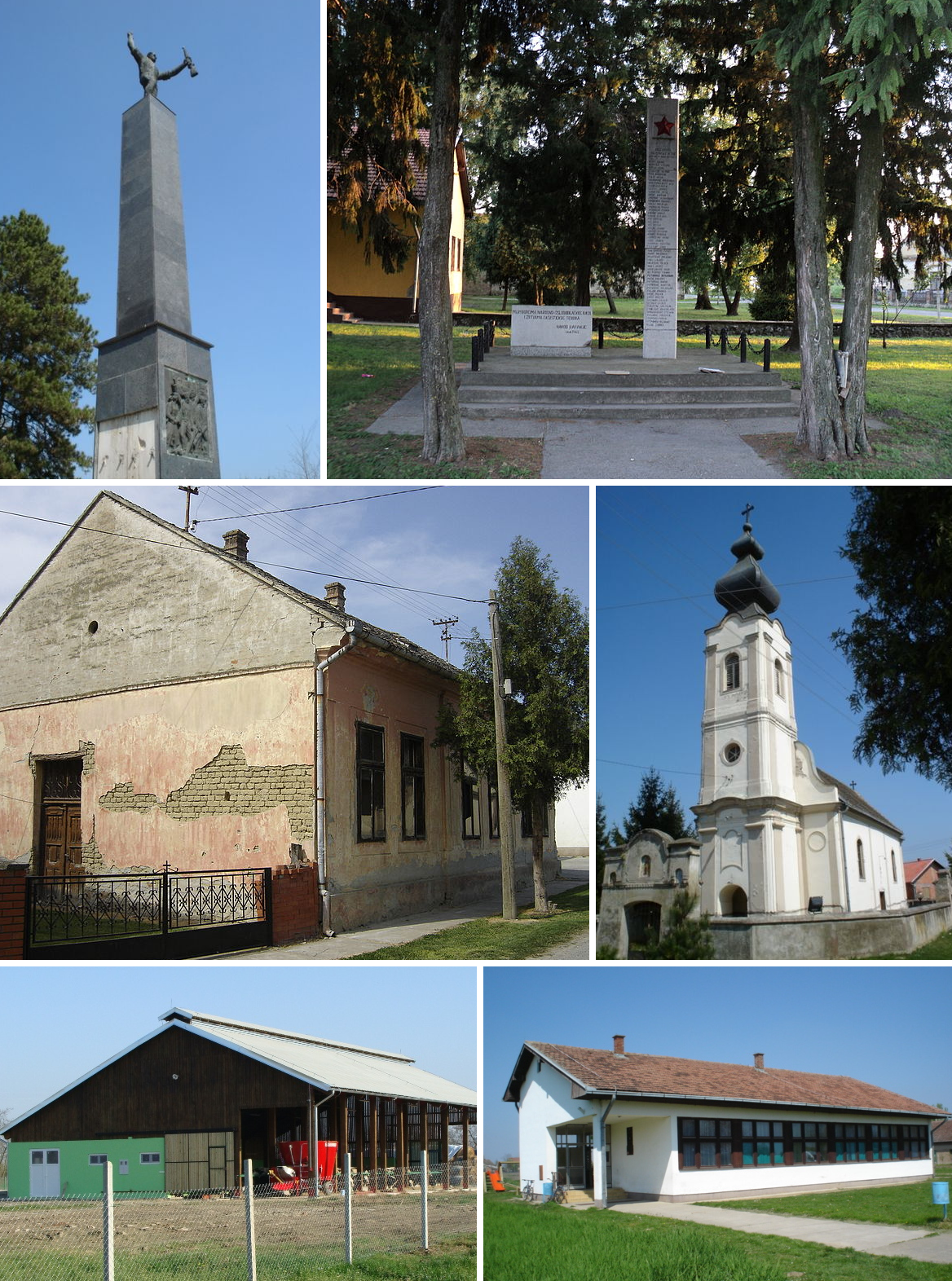

- Location within Osijek-Baranja County Location within Croatia Location within Europe
- Coordinates: 45.72193°N 18.51714°E
- Country: Croatia
- County: Osijek-Baranja
- Municipality: Jagodnjak

Government
  - Body: Local Committee

Area
  - Total: 34.1 km^{2} (13.2 sq mi)

Population (2021)
  - Total: 368
  - Density: 10.8/km^{2} (28.0/sq mi)
- Time zone: UTC+1 (CET)
  - Summer (DST): UTC+2 (CEST)
- Official languages: Croatian, Serbian

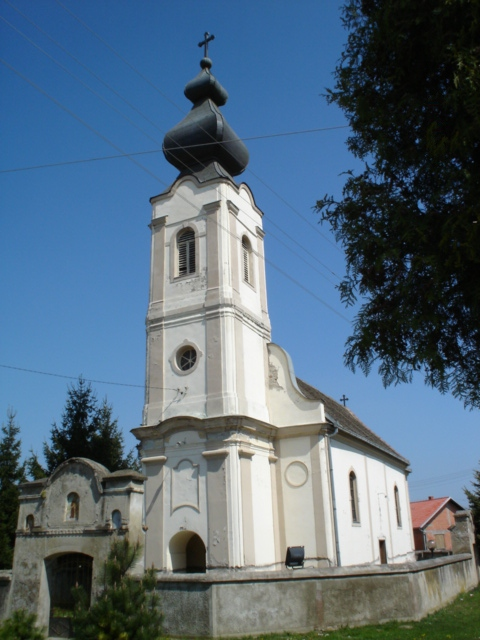
Church of Sts. Peter and Paul

Bolman (Serbian Cyrillic: Болман, Hungarian: Bolmány) is a settlement in the region of Baranja, Croatia. Administratively, it is located in the Jagodnjak municipality within the Osijek-Baranja County. Population is 450 people.

== History ==
From March 6 till March 24, 1945, during World War II, near Bolman was waged battle between Yugoslav Army and Red Army on one side and German army on the other side.

== Demographics ==
=== 1991 ===
- Serbs: 586 (79,08%)
- Croats: 86 (11,60%)
- Yugoslavs: 33 (4,45%)
- Hungarians: 5 (0,67%)
- Others, unknown: 31 (4,18%)

== See also ==
- Jagodnjak Municipality
- Osijek-Baranja county
- Baranja
- Church of Sts. Peter and Paul
