= Majške Međe =

Majške Međe Мајшке Међе (Serbian)
- Village (Selo)
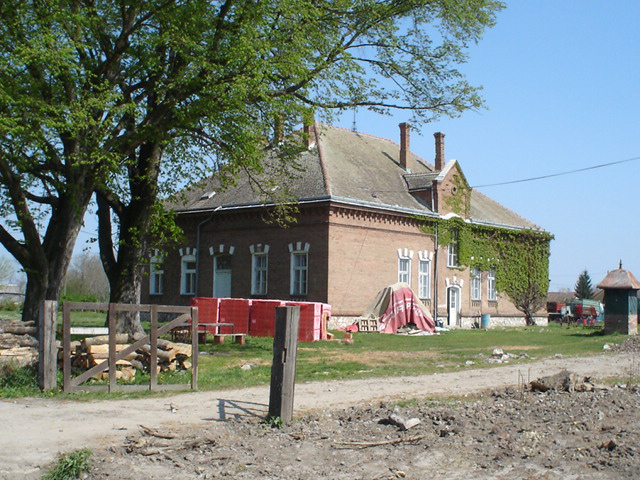

- Location within Osijek-Baranja County Location within Croatia Location within Europe
- Coordinates: 45°44′17″N 18°29′17″E
- Country: Croatia
- County: Osijek-Baranja
- Municipality: Jagodnjak

Government
  - Body: Local Committee

Area
  - Total: 3.0 km^{2} (1.2 sq mi)

Population (2021)
  - Total: 59
  - Density: 20/km^{2} (51/sq mi)
- Time zone: UTC+1 (CET)
  - Summer (DST): UTC+2 (CEST)
- Official languages: Croatian, Serbian

Majške Međe (Hungarian: Majspuszta; Serbian Cyrillic: Мајшке Међе) is a settlement in the region of Baranja, Croatia. Administratively, it is located in the Jagodnjak municipality within the Osijek-Baranja County. Population is 82 people.

== Name ==
The name of the village in Croatian or Serbian is plural.

== See also ==
- Jagodnjak Municipality
- Osijek-Baranja county
- Baranja
