= Dragan Crnogorac (politician) =

Croatian politician (born 1978)

- Драган Црногорац

President of Joint Council of Municipalities
- In office 2005–2017
- Preceded by: Jovan Ajduković
- Succeeded by: Srđan Jeremić

Personal details
- Born: 4 September 1978 (age 48) Vinkovci, SR Croatia, SFR Yugoslavia
- Citizenship: Croatia
- Party: Independent Democratic Serb Party (since 2005)
- Education: University of Novi Sad, Zrenjanin

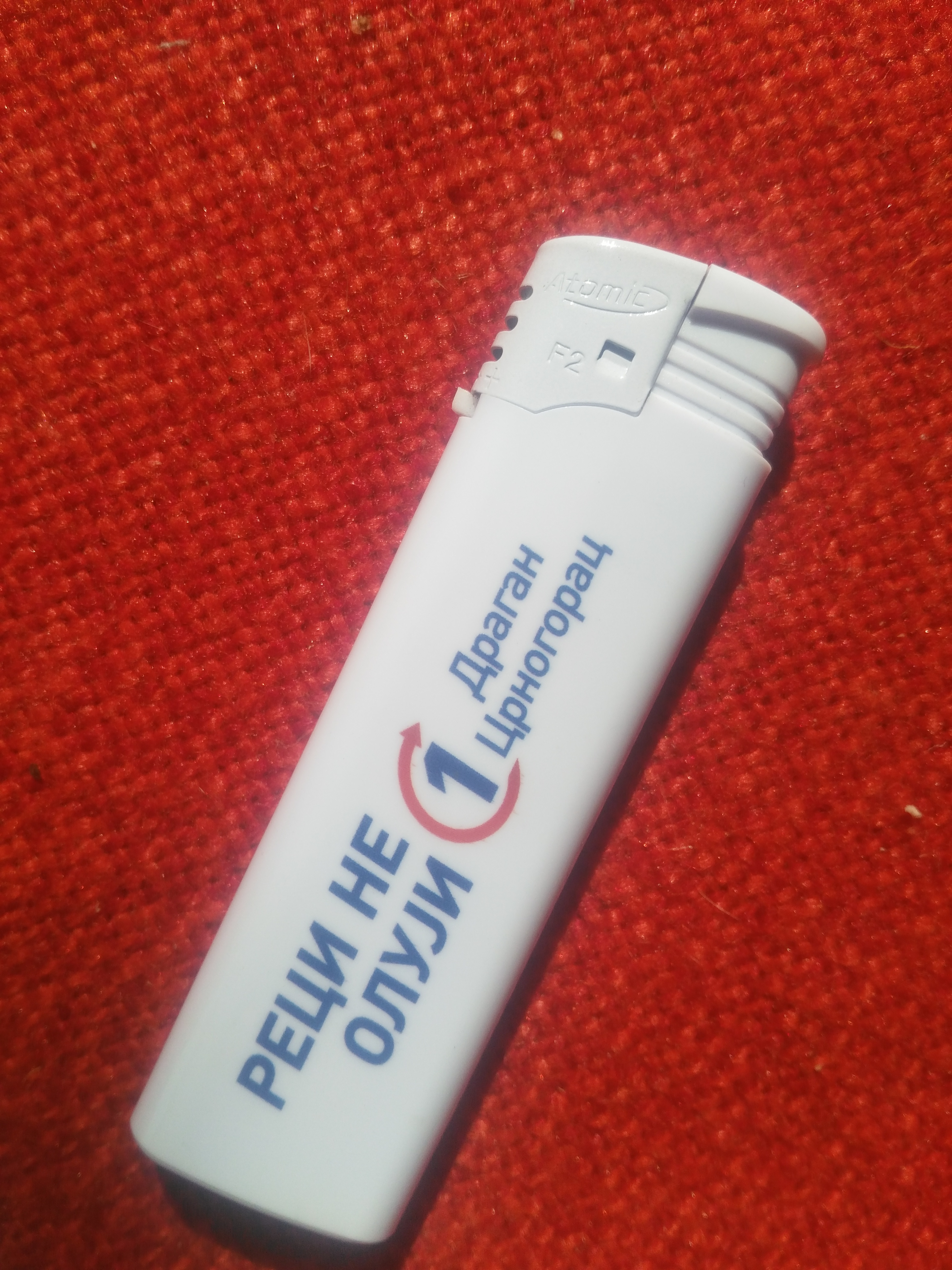
2021 Croatian local elections campaign lighter with what was perceived as controversial slogan "Say no to the Storm" in Serbian Cyrillic.

Dragan Crnogorac (Serbian Cyrillic: Драган Црногорац; born 4 September 1978) is the former President of the Joint Council of Municipalities, a sui generis body that aligns interests of Serb ethnic community in Osijek-Baranja and Vukovar-Syrmia Counties. From October 2012 to 2015, he was also a member of the Sabor. Until the end of his parliamentary mandate, he was a member of the Independent Democratic Serb Party. At the time, he was involved in Serbia-Croatia Intergovernmental Mixed Committee for Minorities, Assembly of Serb National Council, Croatian Radiotelevision program committee, Secretary of the Municipal Council of the Serbian national minority in Stari Jankovci municipality, president of local branch of Independent Democratic Serb Party in Stari Jankovci, Vice President of City Council of the City of Vukovar and member of County Council of the Serbian national minority of Vukovar-Syrmia County. After internal disagreement Crnogorac left the party and became a prominent critic of the SDSS and independent politician within the Serb community.

== President of the Joint Council of Municipalities ==
Dragan Crnogorac was elected president in 2005. His election at this point was unexpected since he was only 27 years old and worked as a young professor of technical education and technical drawing. He took the term from former president Jovan Ajduković, becoming the third president since the establishment of the Joint Council of Municipalities in 1997. As one of its main priorities in the first term he set education. In addition, he announced reform and modernization of the Council internal organizational structure.

As the President of the Council, among other activities, he held a formal meetings with the President of Croatia Ivo Josipović, the President of Serbia Boris Tadić, U.S. Ambassador in Croatia James B. Foley.

== See also ==
- Joint Council of Municipalities
- Serbs of Croatia
- Serb National Council
