= Stanimir Vukićević =

Serbian politician (born 1948)

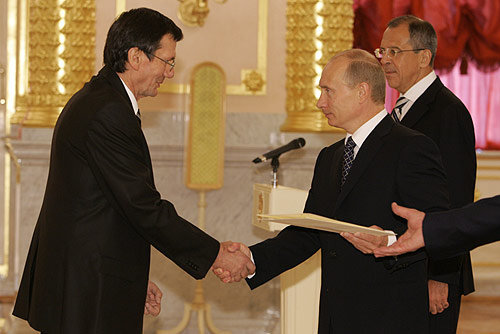
Vukićević presenting his letter of credentials to the President of Russia.

Stanimir Vukićević (born May 28, 1948 in Istok, Serbia) is the current ambassador of Serbia to United Arab Emirates.

He was previously the ambassador of Serbia to Croatia in Zagreb. He graduated from the law faculty and spent the most of his career in diplomacy. During the 1990s he worked in Mogadishu and Tirana, where he served as the Minister-Counselor and Chargé d'affaires. Between 1990 and 1995 he worked as an adviser by the Ministry of Foreign Affairs to the South and Southeast Asia department. After 2000 he was posted as ambassador of Serbia to Bosnia and Herzegovina in Sarajevo and before being appointed as ambassador of Serbia to Russia in Moscow he was an adviser to the Minister of Foreign Affairs. Then he was the ambassador to the Russian Federation. He was also the Ambassador of Serbia to Bosnia and Herzegovina for a second time after Russia. Since 2018 he has been the first Serbian ambassador to the UAE.
