= Union–Nikola Tesla University =

Serbian University

- Универзитет Унион–Никола Тесла
- Established: 2010; 16 years ago
- Rector: Novica Staletović
- Academic staff: 457 (2023–24)
- Students: 5,319 (2023–24)
- Website: unt.edu.rs/en/

The Union – Nikola Tesla University is a private university located in Belgrade, established in 2010. As of 2023–24 academic year, it has 5,319 enrolled students and 457 academic staff.

It consists of nine faculties, with most of them located in Belgrade, and also in Sremski Karlovci, and Niš.

== Faculties ==
The faculties of the Union–Nikola Tesla University with data about location, academic staff and number of students as of 2023–24 academic year:

Faculty	Location	Academic staff	Students
Business Studies and Law	Belgrade	74	1,588
Construction Management, Entrepreneurial Business and Real Estate Management, Ecology and Environmental Protection, International Politics and Security, Economics and Finance, Informatics and Computing	Belgrade	105	1,202
Engineering Management	Belgrade	32	570
Management	Sremski Karlovci	43	458
Sports	Belgrade	43	413
Law, Security, and Management - "Konstantin Veliki"	Niš	24	353
Diplomacy and Security	Belgrade	49	328
Applied Sciences	Niš	49	210
Information Technology and Engineering	Belgrade	38	197
Total		457	5,319
