= Serb National Council =

Political body of the Serb minority in Croatia

- Serb National Council - National Coordination Council of the Serbian National Minority in the Republic of Croatia
- Croatian: Srpsko narodno vijeće Serbian: Српско народно вијеће
- Abbreviation: Serb National Council
- Predecessor: Union of Serb Organizations
- Formation: 1997
- Type: Umbrella organization
- Legal status: Elected political, advisory, and coordinating umbrella organization
- Headquarters: Gajeva 7, Zagreb
- Region served: Croatia
- Official language: Croatian; Serbian
- President: Boris Milošević
- Secretary: Branko Jurišić
- Website: snv.hr

The Serb National Council (Serbo-Croatian: Српско народно вијеће, Srpsko narodno vijeće) is an elected political, consulting and coordinating body which acts as a form of self-government and autonomous cultural institution of the Serbs of Croatia in matters regarding civil rights and cultural identity. The council's main focuses are human, civil and ethnic rights, as well the issues regarding identity, participation and integration of Serbs into the Croatian society. Since 2000 the council is a member of the Federal Union of European Nationalities.

The body was established as the national coordination of the Serb community in Croatia in 1997, in the aftermath of the Croatian War of Independence. The legal basis for its establishment was extracted from the 1995 Erdut Agreement which ended the conflict in the Eastern Slavonia, Baranja, and Western Syrmia by granting rights on cultural autonomy in exchange for peaceful reintegration. Serb National Council network consists of 94 regional and local (municipal or town) councils with a total of 1,581 councillors. They are elected every four years at the National Minorities Councils and Representatives Elections.

== History ==
=== History of Serb Cultural Autonomy in Croatia ===
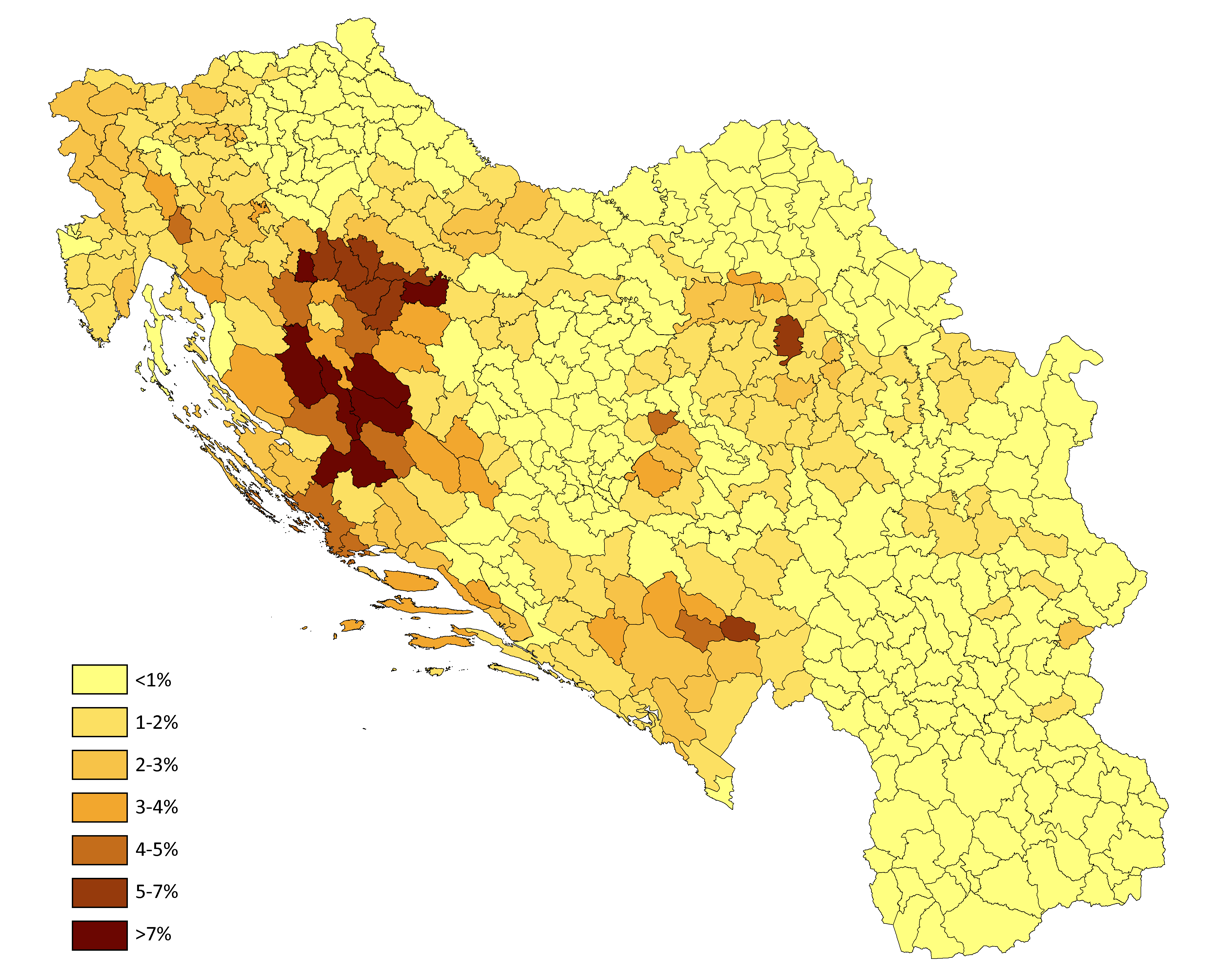
World War II Yugoslav Partisans casualties on a municipal level

The contemporary Serb National Council postulate its cultural tradition in historical precedence of non-segregationist and non-territorial bodies of Serb cultural autonomy in the territory of modern-day Croatia. Section Four (4) of Article One (1) of the Statute of the Serb National Council explicitly enumerate following historical foundations of Serb cultural autonomy based on which the body function:

- A) Historical documents issued by Emperors of the House of Habsburg in 1690, 1691, 1695, 1706, 1713, 1715, 1732 and 1743 and explicitly naming the 1779 Declaratory Rescript of the Illyrian Nation.
- B) Austrian Empire and the Austro-Hungarian Empire legal articles of 1790, 1848 and 1868.
- C) Franz Joseph I of Austria Rescript issued to the Patriarch of Karlovci Samuilo Maširević on 10 October 1868.
- D) The Law of the 14 May 1887 and other acts related to Serb rights enacted by the Sabor (Parliament) of the Triune Kingdom of Croatia, Slavonia and Dalmatia.
- E) 1918 document of the National Council of Slovenes, Croats and Serbs of the State of Slovenes, Croats and Serbs.
- F) Documents of the State Anti-fascist Council for the National Liberation of Croatia affirming Serbs from Croatia, together with Croats, as equal constituents of the Council and its work which represent the foundation of the post-World War II Croatian constitutional organization.

=== Dissolution of Yugoslavia ===
The first multi-party elections in the Socialist Republic of Croatia in 1990 took place during the political crisis within the Socialist Federal Republic of Yugoslavia, the disintegration of the League of Communists of Yugoslavia, and growing ethnic tensions between Croats and Serbs. The majority of Croatian Serbs voted for the reformed League of Communists of Croatia yet it surprisingly ended up only second in the elections. A significant part of the numerous Serb community in Croatia feared that the new government led by then nationalist Croatian Democratic Union may permit or initiate some of the oppressive policies experienced during the World War II Genocide of Serbs in the Independent State of Croatia. Those fears were instrumentalized to the advantage of nationalist Serb Democratic Party which established control over most of the Serb majority communities to complete ethnic separation. Nationalist Serb leadership goals were facilitated by the involvement of the Yugoslav People's Army, particularly in multicultural eastern parts of Slavonia (Podunavlje) which will form SAO Eastern Slavonia, the region where Serbs were not the majority and the Serb Democratic Party did not even exist at the time of 1990 elections.

On 8 December 1991 Serb Democratic Forum was established in Lipik (only two days after the government forces took control of the town) to prevent the further escalation of the Croatian War of Independence and to seek peaceful resolution of the conflict. At that time initial phase of the war was already finished which led to the effective separation of Serbs and Croats. Serbs in areas controlled by the Croatian Government and Croats in the Republic of Serbian Krajina were exposed to persecution and expulsion. In 1992 Serbs in the areas controlled by the Croatian Government started their first initiatives to establish a cultural coordination body. The group intended to establish the Serb National Sabor on the model of historical bodies existing in Austrian Empire from the 17th to the 19th century. The initiative was condemned by the members of Croatian Parliament and Croatian Government as an effort to create a parallel Parliament of Croatia and the following negative media campaign accused the initiative of being more dangerous and perfidious than the separatist actions of Serbs in self-proclaimed Republic of Serbian Krajina. This led to the failure of the initiative and absence of any new initiative until the late 1995 and early 1996.

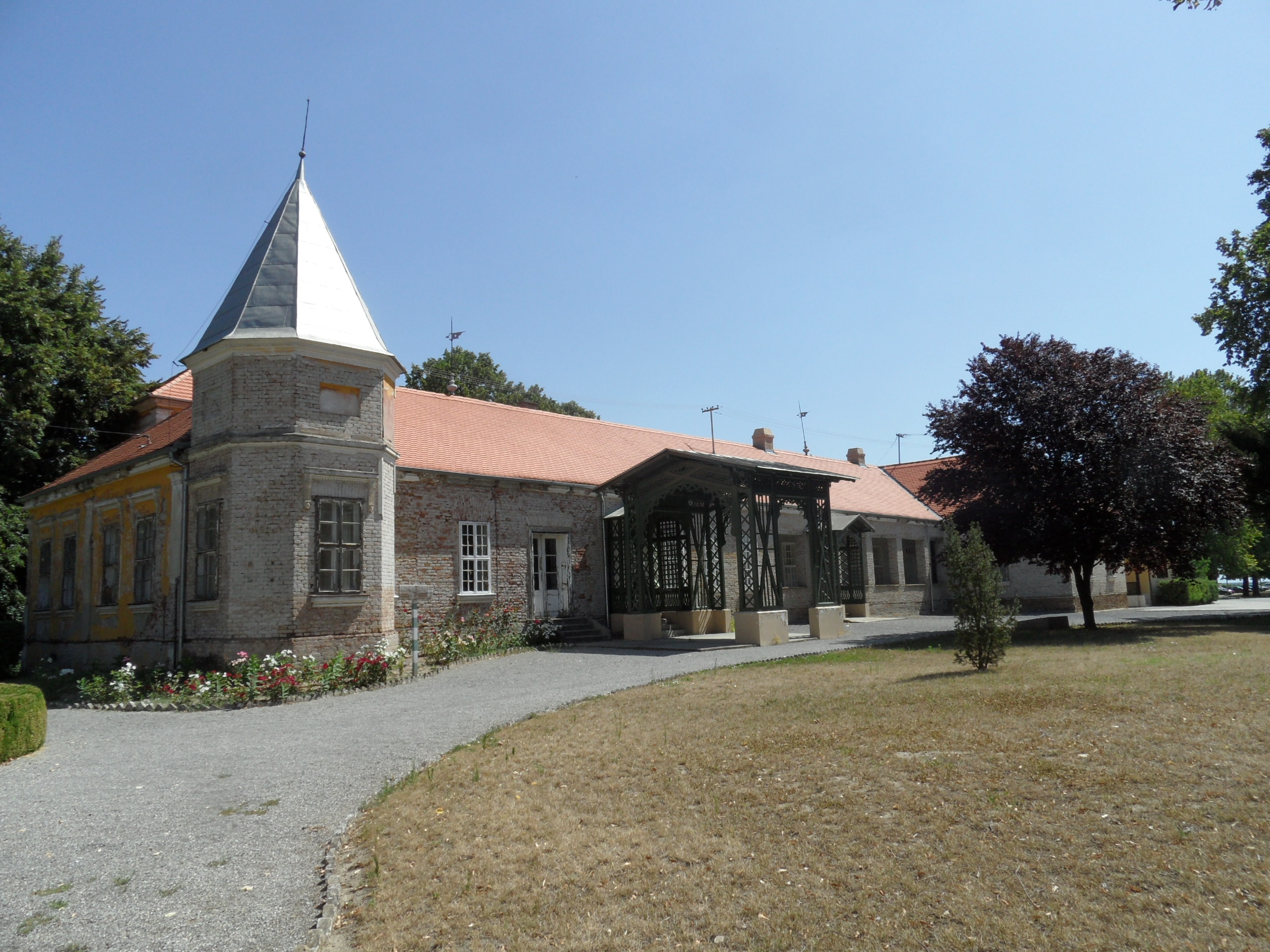
Castle of Adamovich-Cseh, site of signing of the Erdut Agreement in 1995

=== Formation ===
The Serb National Council constituent assembly was held in 1997 in Zagreb at the incentive of the Alliance of Serbian Organizations and its members Prosvjeta, Serb Democratic Forum, Serb Community of Rijeka and Istria and the Joint Council of Municipalities of eastern Slavonia, Baranja and western Syrmia. In addition, founding members were also Independent Democratic Serb Party, Baranja Democratic Forum, Association of Serb Refugees and Expellees from Croatia, representatives of some church parishes of the Serbian Orthodox Church, members of Parliament of Serb ethnicity and respectable individuals.

== Statute ==
The Serb National Council’s Statute consists of 29 articles. According to Statute Article 2, the legal bases for the establishment of the Council are:

- Provisions from Constitution of Croatia
- Croatian Constitutional law on national minorities rights
- International laws on human rights and freedoms and the rights of ethnic and national communities and minorities (United Nations Charter, Universal Declaration of Human Rights, International Covenant on Civil and Political Rights, International Covenant on Economic, Social and Cultural Rights, Helsinki Final Act, Paris Charter and other relevant OSCE documents, European Convention on Human Rights with protocols, International Convention on the Elimination of All Forms of Racial Discrimination, Genocide Convention, Convention on the Rights of the Child and other relevant Treaties signed by Croatia)

== Structure ==
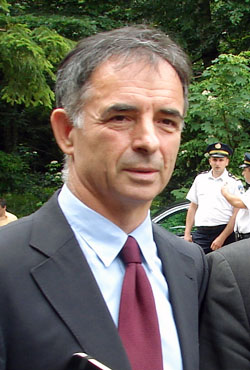
Milorad Pupovac, president of the Serb National Council from 1997 to 2019 and from 2020 to 2025

The Serb National Council structure consists of the Assembly, the Presidency, the Supervisory Board, the president, the deputy president, and vice presidents. Permanent working bodies of the Presidency are:

1. Committee for the selection, appointment, and organization
2. Committee for Human Rights in the constitutional and legal position of the Serbs
3. Committee on education and youth
4. Committee for return, reconstruction, and socio-economic position of Serbs
5. Committee on Information, publishing, and documentation
6. Committee for Cooperation with the Serbs in other countries.

=== Regional and local councils ===
County	City or municipality
Vukovar-Syrmia County	
Koprivnica-Križevci County	
Varaždin County	
Sisak-Moslavina County	
Split-Dalmatia County	
Dubrovnik-Neretva County	
Lika-Senj County	
Bjelovar-Bilogora County	
Primorje-Gorski Kotar County	
Šibenik-Knin County	
Požega-Slavonia County	
Brod-Posavina County	
Zadar County	
Istria County	
Virovitica-Podravina County	
Zagreb County	
Karlovac County	
Osijek-Baranja County	
Zagreb	
Međimurje County	

== Criticisms ==
The Council is the target of criticism from Croatian far-right parties and groups such as Croatian Party of Rights and Croatian Party of Rights dr. Ante Starčević. In 2012, the Council was criticized by the Serb Democratic Forum for alleged non-transparent and illegal management of funds allocated by the Croatian Government for the development and work of Serb organisations and institutions in Croatia.

== Presidents ==
- Milorad Pupovac (1997–2019; 2020–2025)
- Boris Milošević (2019–2020, 2025–)

== See also ==
- Archives of Serbs in Croatia
- Serb National Council of Montenegro
