= Ministry of Foreign and European Affairs (Croatia) =

Ministry of the Croatian government

Coordinates: 45°48′36″N 15°58′45″E

Ministry of Foreign and European Affairs Ministarstvo vanjskih i europskih poslova
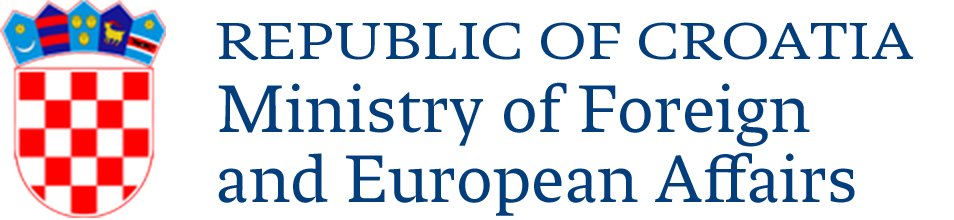

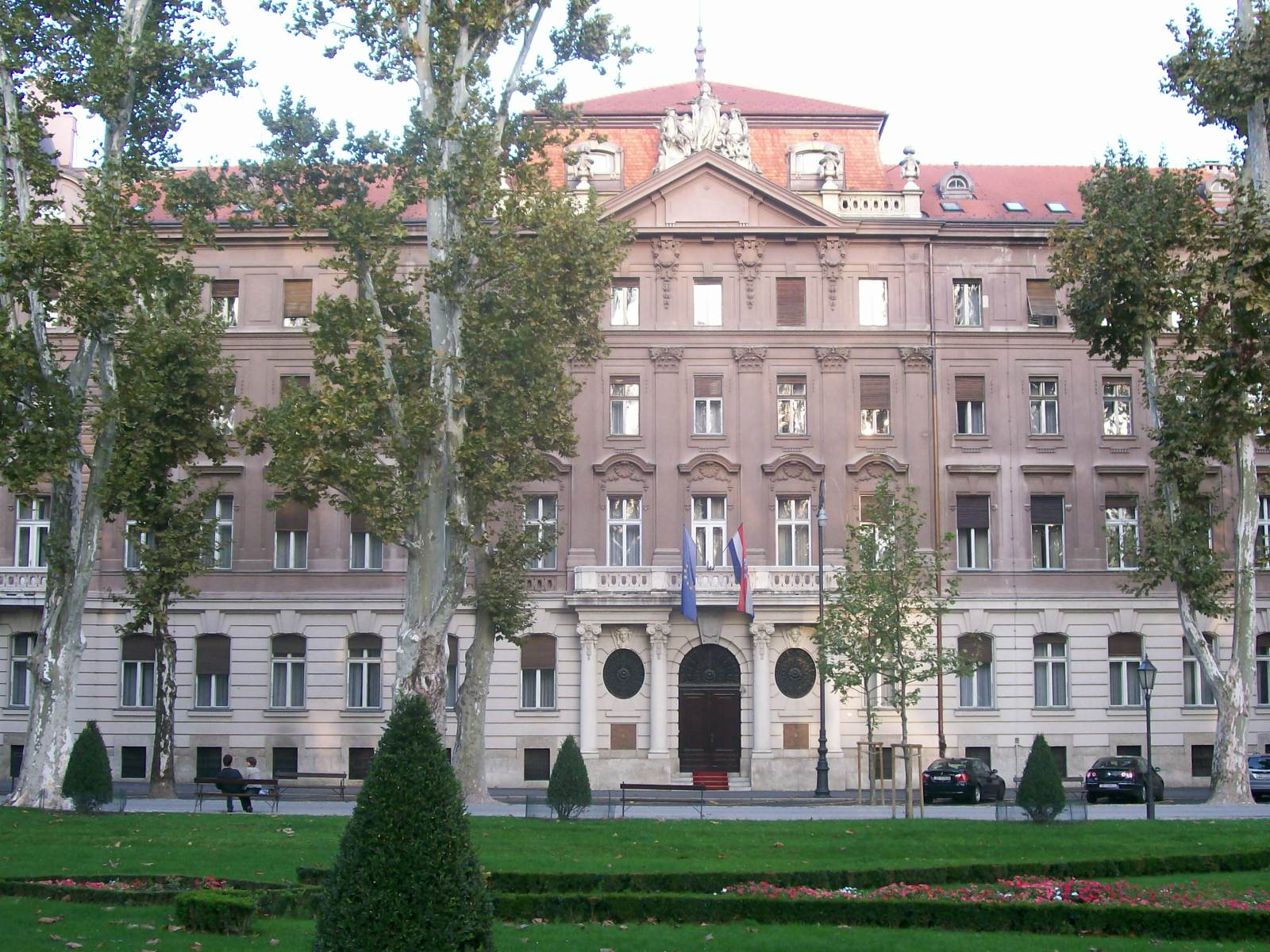
- The Ministry building on Zrinjevac

Ministry overview
- Formed: 31 May 1990; 36 years ago
- Type: Ministry in the Government of Croatia
- Jurisdiction: Croatia
- Headquarters: Trg Nikole Šubića Zrinskog 7, Zagreb, Croatia
- Employees: 1,407 (2025)
- Budget: €193.3 million (2026)
- Website: mvep.gov.hr

Minister
- Currently: Gordan Grlić-Radman since 22 July 2019

The Ministry of Foreign and European Affairs of the Republic of Croatia (Croatian: Ministarstvo vanjskih i europskih poslova or MVEP) is the ministry in the Government of Croatia which is responsible for the country's foreign relations, its diplomatic missions and relations to international organisations, especially the European Union.

== Organization ==
The Ministry has a total of 1,407 staff (as of 2025), working in the following departments:

Department	Croatian language	Staff
Cabinet of the Minister	Kabinet Ministra	26
General Secretariat	Glavno tajništvo	178
Directorate for Europe	Uprava za Europu	80
Directorate for Southeastern Europe	Uprava za Jugoistočnu Europu	40
Political Affairs Directorate	Uprava za političke poslove	73
Directorate for European and International Law	Uprava za europsko i međunarodno pravo	50
Directorate for Multilateral and Global Affairs	Uprava za multilateralu i globalna pitanja	47
Directorate for Consular Affairs	Uprava za konzularne poslove	55
Information Security Directorate	Uprava za informacijsku sigurnost	101
Directorate for Economic Affairs and Development Cooperation	Uprava za gospodarske poslove i razvojnu suradnju	69
Independent Sector for Foreign and European Policy	Samostalni sektor za vanjsku i europsku politiku	21
Independent Sector for Policy Planning	Samostalni sektor za planiranje politika	14
Independent Sector for Public and Cultural Diplomacy	Samostalni sektor za javnu i kulturnu diplomaciju	22
Diplomatic Academy	Diplomatska akademija	27
Diplomatic protocol	Diplomatski protokol	19
Inspectorate of the Foreign Service	Inspektorat službe vanjskih poslova	5
Independent Internal Audit Service	Samostalna služba za unutarnju reviziju	5
Independent Border Service	Samostalna služba za granice	5
Independent Service for the Three Seas Initiative	Samostalna služba za Inicijativu triju mora	5
Special positions
Chief Legal Advisor	Glavni pravni savjetnik	1
Spokesperson	Glasnogovornik	1
Advisor to the Minister	Savjetnik ministra	13
Diplomatic missions and consular offices
Diplomatic staff	Diplomatsko osoblje	352
Administrative and technical staff	Administrativno-tehničko osoblje	124
Security personnel	Djelatnici sigurnosti	74

== Officials ==
Currently serving officials at the Ministry:

- Gordan Grlić-Radman, Minister of Foreign and European Affairs
- Nevenka Cujzek, Secretary General of the Ministry (Glavna tajnica Ministarstva)
- Frano Matušić, State Secretary for Political Affairs (Državni tajnik za političke poslove)
- Andreja Metelko-Zgombić, State Secretary for Europe (Državna tajnica za Europu)
- Zdenko Lucić, State Secretary for Foreign Trade and Development Cooperation (Državni tajnik za vanjsku trgovinu i razvojnu suradnju)
- Lara Romano, Secretary of the Minister's Office (Tajnica Kabineta ministra)
- Terezija Gras, Authorized to perform the duties of Director of the Directorate for Europe (Ovlaštena za obavljanje poslova ravnateljice Uprave za Europu)
- Irena Alajbeg, Director of the Directorate for Economic Affairs and Development Cooperation (Ravnateljica Uprave za gospodarske poslove i razvojnu suradnju)
- Gordana Vidović Mesarek, Authorized to perform the duties of Director of the Directorate for European and International Law (Ovlaštena za obavljanje poslova ravnatelja Uprave za europsko i međunarodno pravo)
- Stribor Kikerec, Authorized to perform the duties of Director of the Directorate for Southeast Europe (Ovlašten za obavljanje poslova ravnatelja Uprave za jugoistočnu Europu)
- Tomislav Lendić, Authorized to perform the duties of Director of the Political Affairs Directorate (Ovlašten za obavljanje poslova ravnatelja Uprave za političke poslove)
- Sebastian Rogač, Director of the Directorate for Multilateral and Global Affairs (Ravnatelj Uprave za multilateralu i globalna pitanja)
- Vinko Ljubičić, Authorized to perform the duties of Director of the Directorate for Consular Affairs (Ovlašten za obavljanje poslova ravnatelja Uprave za konzularne poslove)
- Goran Štefanić, Authorized to perform the duties of the Director of the Information Security Directorate (Ovlašten za obavljanje poslova ravnatelja Uprave za informacijsku sigurnost)
- Antun Buklijaš, Head of the Sector for Policy Planning (Načelnik Sektora za planiranje politika)
- Katja Šare, Head of the Sector for Public and Cultural Diplomacy, Information and Public Relations (Načelnica Sektora za javnu i kulturnu diplomaciju, informiranje i odnose s javnošću)
- Ivan Marić, Spokesperson (Glasnogovornik)
- Karlo Kolesar, Head of the Diplomatic Academy (Načelnik Diplomatske akademije)
- Mirta Jelenc Župan, Head of Diplomatic protocol (Načelnica Diplomatskog protokola)
- Petra Juras Krmek, Inspector General of the Foreign Service (Glavni inspektor Službe vanjskih poslova)
- Sanja Gluhak, Head of the Internal Audit Service (Voditeljica Službe za unutarnju reviziju)
- Mario Martinec, Head of the Three Seas Initiative Service (Voditelj Službe za Inicijativu triju mora)
- Zoran Bradić, Head of the Border Service (Voditelj Službe za granice)

== List of ministers ==
=== Foreign affairs ministers ===
The 15th and current minister is Gordan Grlić-Radman, in office since 22 July 2019. The longest serving minister was Mate Granić (1993–2000), under Prime Ministers Nikica Valentić and Zlatko Mateša, and the shortest serving was Davorin Rudolf who held the post for three months between May 1991 to July 1991 under Prime Minister Josip Manolić.

Political parties:

Croatian Democratic Union (13)
Social Democratic Party (1)
Croatian People's Party – Liberal Democrats (1)

No.	Portrait	Minister of Foreign Affairs	Took office	Left office	Time in office	Party	Cabinet
1	Zdravko Mršić [hr]	Zdravko Mršić (born 1936)	31 May 1990	8 November 1990	161 days	HDZ	Mesić; Manolić
2	Frane Vinko Golem	Frane Vinko Golem (1938–2007)	8 November 1990	3 May 1991	176 days	HDZ	Manolić
3	Davorin Rudolf [hr]	Davorin Rudolf (born 1934)	3 May 1991	31 July 1991	89 days	HDZ	Manolić; Gregurić
4	Zvonimir Šeparović	Zvonimir Šeparović (1928–2022)	31 July 1991	27 May 1992	301 days	HDZ	Gregurić
5	Zdenko Škrabalo	Zdenko Škrabalo (1929–2014)	9 June 1992	28 May 1993	353 days	HDZ	Gregurić; Šarinić; Valentić
6	Mate Granić*	Mate Granić* (born 1947)	28 May 1993	27 January 2000	6 years, 244 days	HDZ	Valentić; Mateša
7	Tonino Picula	Tonino Picula (born 1961)	27 January 2000	22 December 2003	3 years, 329 days	SDP	Račan I–II
8	Miomir Žužul	Miomir Žužul (born 1955)	23 December 2003	17 February 2005	1 year, 56 days	HDZ	Sanader I
9	Kolinda Grabar-Kitarović	Kolinda Grabar-Kitarović (born 1968)	17 February 2005	12 January 2008	2 years, 329 days	HDZ	Sanader I
10	Gordan Jandroković*	Gordan Jandroković* (born 1967)	13 January 2008	23 December 2011	3 years, 344 days	HDZ	Sanader II; Kosor
11	Vesna Pusić*[d]	Vesna Pusić*^{[d]} (born 1953)	23 December 2011	22 January 2016	4 years, 30 days	HNS-LD	Milanović
12	Miro Kovač	Miro Kovač (born 1968)	22 January 2016	19 October 2016	271 days	HDZ	Orešković
13	Davor Ivo Stier*	Davor Ivo Stier* (born 1972)	19 October 2016	19 June 2017	243 days	HDZ	Plenković I
14	Marija Pejčinović Burić*	Marija Pejčinović Burić* (born 1963)	19 June 2017	19 July 2019	2 years, 33 days	HDZ	Plenković I
15	Gordan Grlić-Radman	Gordan Grlić-Radman (born 1958)	19 July 2019	Incumbent	7 years, 100 days	HDZ	Plenković I–II-III

Source: MVPEI.hr (in Croatian)

(*) Ministers of Foreign Affairs who held the post of Deputy Prime Minister of Croatia while in office.

=== European integration ministers ===
The Ministry for European Integration was a short-lived ministry which was established during Prime Minister Ivica Račan in 2000. It grew out of the Government Office for European Integration and was later merged with the Ministry for Foreign Affairs in 2005 under Prime Minister Ivo Sanader. The ministry was charged with overseeing the changes to the legislation needed to comply with the community acquis in preparation and during the Accession of Croatia to the European Union.

Political parties:

Croatian Democratic Union (2)
Social Democratic Party (1)
Istrian Democratic Assembly (1)

No.	Portrait	Minister for European Integration	Took office	Left office	Time in office	Party	Cabinet
1	Ljerka Mintas-Hodak*[a]	Ljerka Mintas-Hodak*^{[a]} (born 1952)	3 April 1998	27 January 2000	1 year, 299 days	HDZ	Mateša
2	Ivan Jakovčić[b]	Ivan Jakovčić^{[b]} (born 1957)	27 January 2000	21 June 2001	1 year, 145 days	IDS	Račan I
3	Neven Mimica	Neven Mimica (born 1953)	28 September 2001	23 December 2003	2 years, 86 days	SDP	Račan I–II
4	Kolinda Grabar-Kitarović[c]	Kolinda Grabar-Kitarović^{[c]} (born 1968)	23 December 2003	16 February 2005	1 year, 55 days	HDZ	Sanader I

(*) Ministers for European Integration who held the post of Deputy Prime Minister of Croatia while in office.

=== Notes ===
a. Unofficial minister. Mintas-Hodak was head of the Government Office for European Integration (Croatian: Ured za europske integracije) established in 1998.
b. Jakovčić was appointed first head of the newly formed Ministry for European Integration in 2000 in the Cabinet of Ivica Račan I. The ministry was created out of the former Government Office for European Integration.
c. Grabar-Kitarović was appointed European integration minister in 2003 in the Cabinet of Ivo Sanader I. On 16 February 2005 the Ministry for European Integration was merged with the Ministry for Foreign Affairs and Grabar-Kitarović took over as head of the merged ministry.
d. Pusić was appointed to the post of Minister of Foreign and European Affairs, as the ministry was renamed in 2011 in the Cabinet of Zoran Milanović.

== See also ==
- Foreign relations of Croatia
- List of diplomatic missions of Croatia
