= Branko Jeren =

Croatian engineer and politician

Minister of Science and Technology
- In office 23 February 1993 – 7 November 1995
- Prime Minister: Hrvoje Šarinić Nikica Valentić
- Preceded by: Ivo Sanader
- Succeeded by: Ivica Kostović

Personal details
- Born: 27 March 1951 (age 75) Zagreb, PR Croatia, FPR Yugoslavia
- Party: Croatian Democratic Union (HDZ)
- Education: University of Zagreb (Faculty of Electrical Engineering and Computing)
- Occupation: Computers engineering; Digital signal processing

Branko Jeren (born 27 March 1951) is a Croatian university professor, former rector of the University of Zagreb. He formerly served as the Croatian Minister of Science and Technology in the fourth and the fifth Government of the Republic of Croatia from February 1993 to November 1995.

== Early life, education and career ==
Jeren was born in Zagreb in 1951, where he finished elementary and secondary school. In 1973, he graduated from the Faculty of Electrical Engineering in Zagreb (today Faculty of Electrical Engineering and Computing), and gained his PhD in 1984 at the same Faculty.

He worked as a postgraduate assistant at the Electronics Department of the Rudjer Bošković Institute from 1973 to 1975, and at the Institute of Electrical Engineering in Zagreb from 1975 to 1976, on the problems of an implementation of computers in nuclear power plants, thermal power plants and dispatch centers. Since 1976, he has been employed as an assistant at the Faculty of Electrical Engineering, at the Department of Electronic Systems and Information Processing. Branko Jeren became full professor in 1996 and was elected to the honorary title of professor emeritus in 2021. Prof. Jeren also worked at universities in Germany (University of Erlangen–Nuremberg), the USA (University of California, Santa Barbara) and Great Britain.

In the period from February 1998 to April 2002 he was the rector of the University of Zagreb.

== Minister and memberships ==
Prof. Jeren held many important political duties, he was assistant Minister and then deputy Minister of Science, Technology and Informatics, both in 1991 year. Branko Jeren was the Minister of Science and Technology close to the end of the fourth Croatian Government, cabinet of Hrvoje Šarinić from February 1993 to April 1993, when ministry changed name from Ministry of Science to Ministry of Science and Technology. During a reconstruction of the Government, he remained his seat as Minister of Science and Technology in the next fifth Government of the Republic of Croatia, cabinet of Nikica Valentić, and held that position until the end of the fifth Government in November 1995. He was an advisor of the President of the Republic of Croatia for science and technology between 1996 and 1998.

It is significant his contribution to the establishment of a system for the employment of Novice scientists as part of scientific research projects, which laid the foundations for personnel renewal and the development of scientific community in Croatia.

He is a member of the Croatian Society for Communications, Computing, Electronics, Measurements and Automation (KoREMA), the international organization European Association for Signal Processing (EURASIP), the technical committee of the Distributed Intelligence systems of the world association IFAC (International Federation of Automatic Control), and the international organization The Institute of Electrical and Electronics Engineers (IEEE).

== Awards and projects ==
In 1978, he received the federal award Dr. Vratislav Bednjanić for the master's thesis entitled "Processor for digital filtering", in 1986 he won the Josip Lončar silver plaque for his doctoral dissertation and in 1995 he was awarded the Order of Danica with the image of Rudjer Bosković. In 1997 prof. Jeren received National Science Award and in 2004 Golden Plaque "Josip Lončar" for dedicated teaching and scientific work and exceptional contribution to the development of the Faculty of Electrical Engineering and Computing. He was awarded the "Nikola Tesla" award of the Croatian IEEE section in 2015, and the State Award for Lifetime Achievement in the field of technical sciences, in 2019.

He is one of the initiators of the Croatian Academic Computer Network (CARNet).

He was the manager of several scientific research projects (domestic and international) in the field of digital signal processing and computer systems for measuring, guidance and control of processes.
