= Cabinet of Nikica Valentić =

Croatian government (1993–1995)

Valentić Cabinet
- 5th Cabinet of the Republic of Croatia

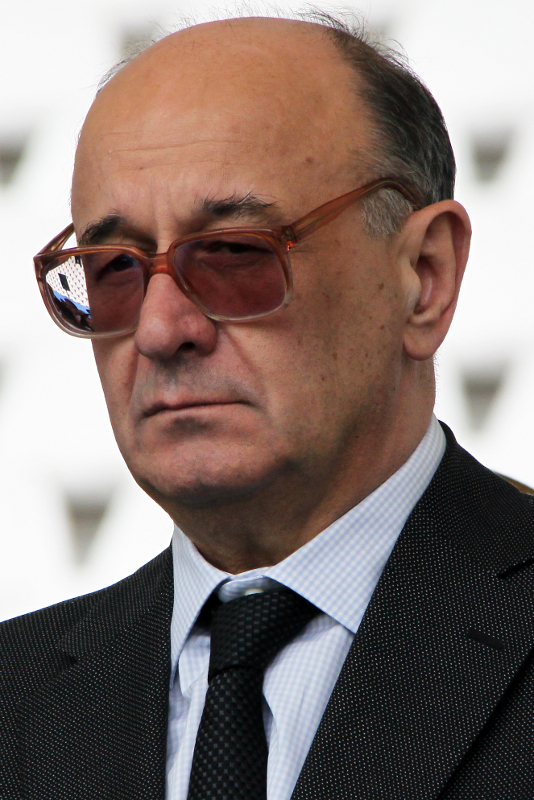
- Date formed: 3 April 1993
- Date dissolved: 7 November 1995

People and organisations
- Head of state: Franjo Tuđman
- Head of government: Nikica Valentić
- Deputy head of government: Mate Granić; Borislav Škegro; Vladimir Šeks (1993–1994); Ivica Kostović (1993–1995); Jure Radić (1994–1995); Bosiljko Mišetić (1995)
- No. of ministers: 27 (on 7 November 1995)
- Ministers removed: 13
- Total no. of members: 40 (including former members)
- Member parties: Croatian Democratic Union
- Status in legislature: Single-party majority
- Opposition party: Croatian Social Liberal Party
- Opposition leader: Dražen Budiša

History
- Election: 1992 election
- Legislature terms: 1992–1995
- Predecessor: Cabinet of Hrvoje Šarinić
- Successor: Cabinet of Zlatko Mateša

The Fifth Government of the Republic of Croatia (Croatian: Peta Vlada Republike Hrvatske) was the Croatian Government cabinet led by Prime Minister Nikica Valentić. It was announced on 3 April 1993, being formed by the ruling Croatian Democratic Union. Its term ended on 7 November 1995 after the 1995 Croatian parliamentary election. The term of this cabinet saw the conclusion of major military operations in the Croatian War of Independence and the start of negotiations in Dayton, which would soon end the war formally.

== List of ministers and portfolios ==
The periods in the table fall outside the cabinet's term when the minister listed also served in the preceding or the subsequent cabinets.

Name	Party	Portfolio	Period
Nikica Valentić	HDZ	Prime Minister	3 April 1993 – 7 November 1995
Ivica Kostović	HDZ	Deputy Prime Minister	12 October 1993 – 14 October 1998
Bosiljko Mišetić	HDZ	Deputy Prime Minister	11 May – 7 November 1995
Borislav Škegro	HDZ	Deputy Prime Minister	3 April 1993 – 27 January 2000
Vladimir Šeks	HDZ	Deputy Prime Minister	12 August 1992 – 20 September 1994
Zoran Jašić	HDZ	Minister of Finance	12 August 1992 – 7 July 1994
Božo Prka	HDZ	Minister of Finance	7 July 1994 – 11 September 1997
Ivan Čermak	HDZ	Minister of Industry, Shipbuilding and Energy	3 April – 20 May 1993
Ivan Čermak	HDZ	Minister of Economy	20 May 1993 – 12 October 1993
Nadan Vidošević	HDZ	Minister of Economy	12 October 1993 – 18 September 1995
Zlatko Mateša	HDZ	Minister of Economy	18 September 1995 – 7 November 1995
Zlatko Mateša	HDZ	Minister without portfolio	3 April 1993 – 18 September 1995
Zlatko Tomčić	HSS	Minister of Construction and Environment	3 April 1993 – 31 December 1994
Gojko Šušak	HDZ	Minister of Defence	18 September 1991 – 3 May 1998
Ivan Tarnaj	HDZ	Minister of Agriculture, Forestry and Water Management	3 April 1993 – 31 December 1994
Ivica Gaži	HDZ	Minister of Agriculture and Forestry	27 January 1995 – 7 November 1995
Ivica Mudrinić	HDZ	Minister of Maritime Affairs, Transport and Communications	12 August 1992 – 5 February 1996
Ivica Crnić	HDZ	Minister of Justice and Administration	12 August 1992 – 20 May 1993
Ivica Crnić	HDZ	Minister of Justice	20 May 1993 – 18 May 1995
Miroslav Šeparović	HDZ	Minister of Justice	18 May 1995 – 20 April 1998
Ivan Penić	HDZ	Minister of Privatisation and Property Management	27 January 1995 – 16 December 1996
Josip Juras	HDZ	Minister of Labour and Social Welfare	15 April 1992 – 12 October 1993
Ivan Parać	HDZ	Minister of Labour and Social Welfare	12 October 1993 – 27 January 1995
Joso Škara	HDZ	Minister of Labour and Social Welfare	27 January 1995 – 27 January 2000
Jure Radić	HDZ	Deputy Prime Minister	18 October 1994 – 27 January 2000
Jure Radić	HDZ	Minister for Development and Reconstruction	18 October 1994 – 18 May 1999
Niko Bulić	HDZ	Minister of Commerce and Tourism	3 April – 20 May 1993
Niko Bulić	HDZ	Minister of Tourism	20 May 1993 – 11 September 1997
Ivan Jarnjak	HDZ	Minister of the Interior	14 April 1992 – 12 December 1996
Zdenko Škrabalo	HDZ	Minister of Foreign Affairs	9 June 1992 – 27 May 1993
Mate Granić	HDZ	Minister of Foreign Affairs	27 May 1993 – 27 January 2000
Mate Granić	HDZ	Deputy Prime Minister	31 July 1991 – 27 January 2000
Juraj Njavro	HDZ	Minister without portfolio	12 October 1993 – 19 December 1997
Juraj Njavro	HDZ	Minister of Health	12 August 1992 – 12 October 1993
Andrija Hebrang	HDZ	Minister of Health	12 October 1993 – 14 May 1998
Marina Matulović-Dropulić	HDZ	Minister of Physical Planning, Construction and Housing	27 January 1995 – 16 December 1996
Branko Jeren	HDZ	Minister of Science and Technology	23 February 1993 – 7 November 1995
Vesna Girardi-Jurkić	HDZ	Minister of Culture and Education	15 April 1992 – 18 October 1994
Zlatko Vitez	HDZ	Minister of Culture	18 October 1994 – 7 November 1995
Ljilja Vokić	HDZ	Minister of Education and Sports	18 October 1994 – 4 March 1998
Jurica Malčić	HDZ	Government secretary	1 September 1992 – 13 May 1993
Jurica Malčić	HDZ	Minister of Public Administration	20 May 1993 – 2 March 1994
Davorin Mlakar	HDZ	Government secretary	13 May 1993 – 3 March 1994
Davorin Mlakar	HDZ	Minister of Public Administration	2 March 1994 – 4 March 1998
Ivan Majdak	HDZ	Minister without portfolio	3 April 1993 – 7 November 1995
Marijan Petrović	HDZ	Minister without portfolio	11 May – 7 November 1995
Adalbert Rebić	HDZ	Minister without portfolio	27 January – 7 November 1995
Davor Štern	HDZ	Minister without portfolio	21 August – 7 November 1995
Jagoda Premužić	Non-party	Government secretary	3 March 1994 –
