= List of chairpersons of the Croatian Democratic Union =

President of the Croatian Democratic Union
- Predsjednik Hrvatske demokratske zajednice
- Logo of the Croatian Democratic Union

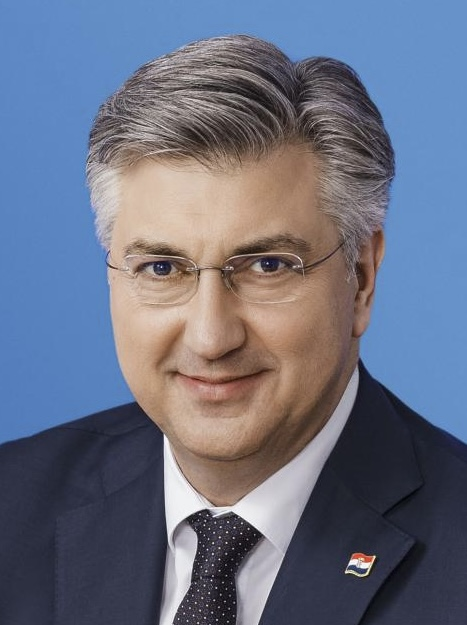
- Incumbent; Andrej Plenković since 17 July 2016
- Status: Party leader
- Appointer: Predsjedništvo
- Term length: Four years
- Constituting instrument: Party statutes
- Website: hdz.hr

This is a list of chairpersons of the Croatian Democratic Union.

== List of officeholders ==
Portrait	Name	Took office	Left office	Notes	Prime Minister	Ref.
	Franjo Tuđman	17 June 1989	10 December 1999	Died in office.	Antun Milović; Stjepan Mesić; Josip Manolić; Franjo Gregurić; Hrvoje Šarinić; Nikica Valentić; Zlatko Mateša	
	Vladimir Šeks (Acting)	5 January 2000	30 April 2000	Acting holder of the office following Franjo Tuđman's death.	Zlatko Mateša; Ivica Račan	
	Ivo Sanader	30 April 2000	4 July 2009	Resigned while in office.	Ivica Račan; Himself	
	Jadranka Kosor	4 July 2009	21 May 2012		Herself; Zoran Milanović	
	Tomislav Karamarko	21 May 2012	17 July 2016		Zoran Milanović; Tihomir Orešković	
	Andrej Plenković	17 July 2016	Incumbent		Tihomir Orešković; Himself	
