= Cabinet of Hrvoje Šarinić =

Croatian government (1992–1993)

Šarinić Cabinet
- 4th Cabinet of the Republic of Croatia

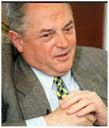
- Date formed: 12 August 1992
- Date dissolved: 3 April 1993

People and organisations
- Head of state: Franjo Tuđman
- Head of government: Hrvoje Šarinić
- Deputy head of government: Mate Granić; Vladimir Šeks; Darko Čargonja (1992); Ivan Milas (1992–1993); Mladen Vedriš (1992–1993)
- No. of ministers: 22 (on 3 April 1993)
- Ministers removed: 4
- Total no. of members: 26 (including former members)
- Member parties: Croatian Democratic Union (HDZ)
- Status in legislature: Single-party majority
- Opposition party: Croatian Social Liberal Party
- Opposition leader: Dražen Budiša

History
- Election: 1992 election
- Legislature terms: 1992–1995
- Predecessor: Cabinet of Franjo Gregurić
- Successor: Cabinet of Nikica Valentić

Fourth Government of the Republic of Croatia (Croatian: Četvrta Vlada Republike Hrvatske) was the Croatian Government cabinet led by Prime Minister Hrvoje Šarinić. It was announced on 12 August 1992 after the 1992 Croatian parliamentary election. It was the 4th cabinet of Croatia, formed by the ruling Croatian Democratic Union, and was reconstructed on 3 April 1993.

== List of ministers and portfolios ==
The periods in the table fall outside the cabinet's term when the minister listed served in the preceding or the subsequent cabinets.

Name	Party	Portfolio	Period
Hrvoje Šarinić	HDZ	Prime Minister	12 August 1992 – 3 April 1993
Darko Čargonja	HDZ	Deputy Prime Minister	12 August – 29 December 1992
Mate Granić	HDZ	Deputy Prime Minister	31 July 1991 – 27 January 2000
Ivan Milas	HDZ	Deputy Prime Minister	27 August 1992 – 3 April 1993
Vladimir Šeks	HDZ	Deputy Prime Minister	12 August 1992 – 20 September 1994
Mladen Vedriš	HDZ	Deputy Prime Minister	29 December 1992 – 3 April 1993
Zoran Jašić	HDZ	Minister of Finance	12 August 1992 – 7 July 1994
Zdenko Karakaš	HDZ	Minister of Construction and Environment	12 August 1992 – 3 April 1993
Franjo Kajfež	HDZ	Minister of Industry, Shipbuilding and Energy	15 April 1992 – 3 April 1993
Gojko Šušak	HDZ	Minister of Defence	18 September 1991 – 3 May 1998
Ivan Majdak	HDZ	Minister of Agriculture and Forestry	12 August 1992 – 3 April 1993
Ivica Mudrinić	HDZ	Minister of Maritime Affairs, Transport and Communications	12 August 1992 – 5 February 1996
Ivica Crnić	HDZ	Minister of Justice and Administration	12 August 1992 – 20 May 1993
Josip Juras	HDZ	Minister of Labour, Social Welfare and Family	15 April 1992 – 12 October 1993
Branko Mikša	HDZ	Minister of Tourism and Commerce	12 August 1992 – 3 April 1993
Ivan Jarnjak	HDZ	Minister of the Interior	14 April 1992 – 12 December 1996
Zdenko Škrabalo	HDZ	Minister of Foreign Affairs	9 June 1992 – 27 May 1993
Juraj Njavro	HDZ	Minister of Health	12 August 1992 – 12 October 1993
Ivo Sanader	HDZ	Minister of Science	12 August 1992 – 7 January 1993
Branko Jeren	HDZ	Minister of Science and Technology	23 February 1993 – 7 November 1995
Vesna Girardi-Jurkić	HDZ	Minister of Education, Culture and Sports	15 April 1992 – 18 October 1994
Zvonimir Baletić	HDZ	Minister without portfolio	7 September 1992 – 26 January 1993
Čedomir Pavlović		Minister without portfolio	12 August 1992 – 3 April 1993
Smiljko Sokol	HDZ	Minister without portfolio	12 August 1992 – 3 April 1993
Gordan Radin	HDZ	Government secretary	3 September 1991 – 31 August 1992
Jurica Malčić	HDZ	Government secretary	1 September 1992 – 13 May 1993
