= Ministry of Culture and Media (Croatia) =

Ministry of the Croatian government

Ministry of Culture and Media Ministarstvo kulture i medija
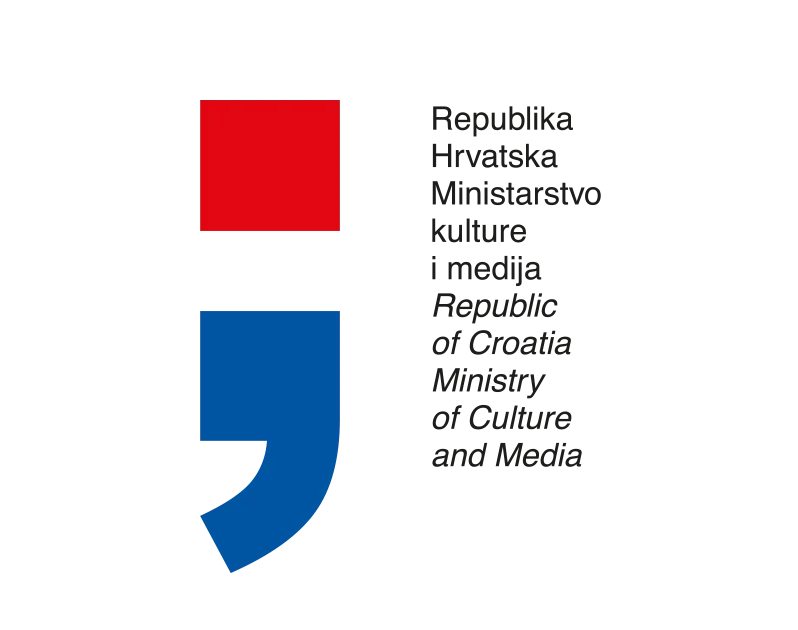

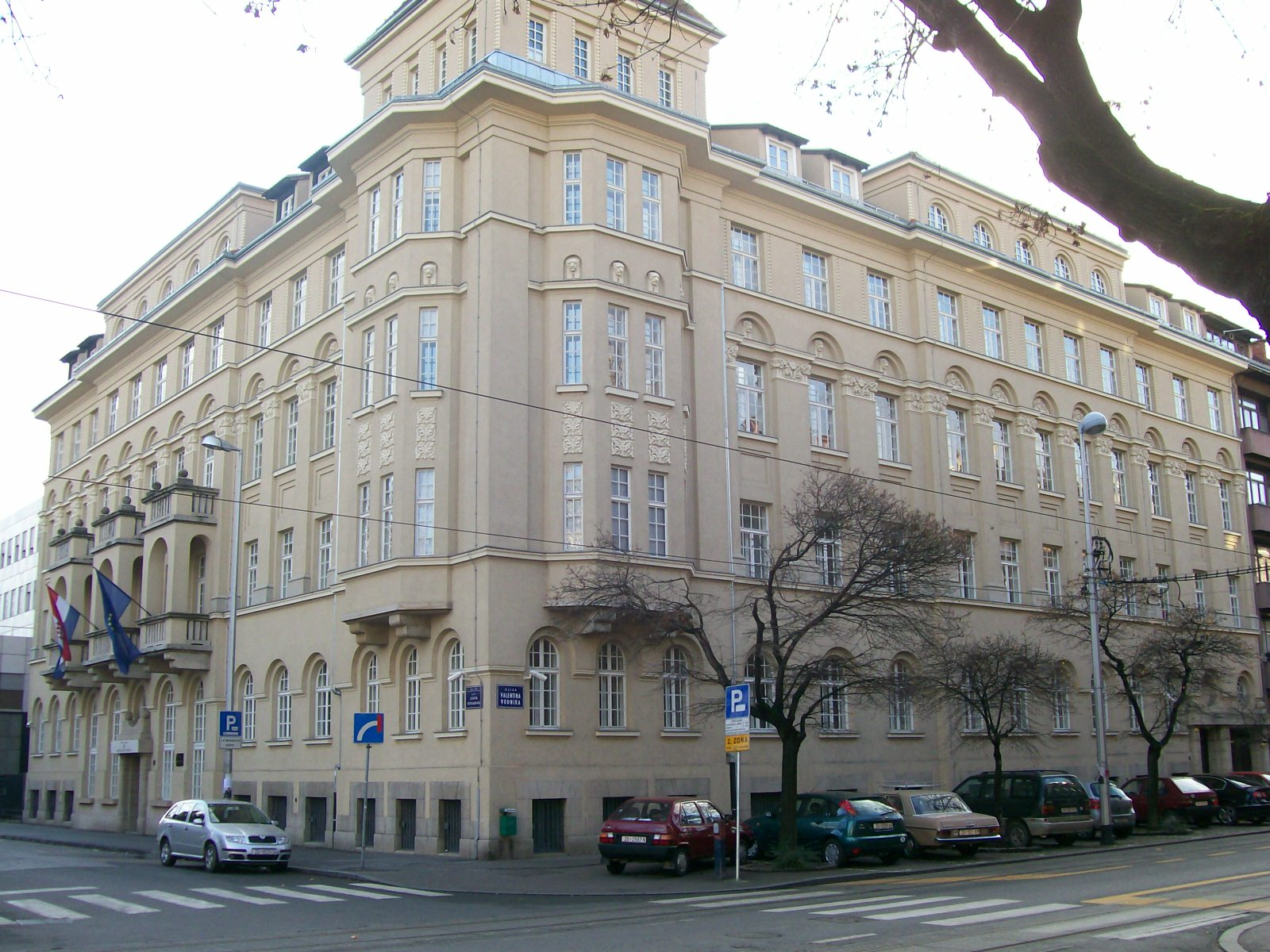
- Headquarters of the Ministry

Ministry overview
- Formed: 31 May 1990; 36 years ago
- Type: Ministry in the Government of Croatia
- Headquarters: Runjaninova 2, Zagreb, Croatia
- Employees: 485 (2025 estimate)
- Budget: €642 million (2025 budget)
- Website: min-kulture.gov.hr

Minister
- Currently: Nina Obuljen Koržinek since 19 October 2016

The Ministry of Culture and Media of the Republic of Croatia (Croatian: Ministarstvo kulture i medija) is a ministry of the Croatian government in charge of preserving the country's natural and cultural heritage and overseeing its development. The ministry in its present form was created in 1994 in the Cabinet of Nikica Valentić, as the culture portfolio had previously been part of the Ministry of Education, Culture and Sports (1990–93) and the Ministry of Culture and Education (1993–94).

== List of ministers ==
The following is the list of officials who held the post of culture ministers since 1990. Unless otherwise noted, the portfolio only included culture, and officials were titled Ministers of Culture.

Minister	Party	Term start	Term end	Days in office	Cabinet(s)
Vlatko Pavletić ^{[nb 1]}	HDZ	31 May 1990	15 April 1992	685	Mesić Manolić Gregurić
Vesna Girardi-Jurkić ^{[nb 2]}	HDZ	15 April 1992	18 October 1994	916	Gregurić Šarinić Valentić
Zlatko Vitez	HDZ	18 October 1994	7 November 1995	385	Valentić
Božo Biškupić	HDZ	7 November 1995	27 January 2000	1,542	Mateša
Antun Vujić	SDP	27 January 2000	23 December 2003	1,426	Račan I Račan II
Božo Biškupić (2nd term)	HDZ	23 December 2003	29 December 2010	2,563	Sanader I Sanader II Kosor
Jasen Mesić	HDZ	29 December 2010	23 December 2011	359	Kosor
Andrea Zlatar-Violić	HNS	23 December 2011	25 March 2015	1,188	Milanović
Berislav Šipuš	HNS	25 March 2015	22 January 2016	273	Milanović
Zlatko Hasanbegović	HDZ	22 January 2016	19 October 2016	271	Orešković
Nina Obuljen Koržinek ^{[nb 3]}	HDZ	19 October 2016	Incumbent	3,576	Plenković I Plenković II Plenković III

=== Notes ===
nb 1. As Minister of Education, Culture and Sports
nb 2. As Minister of Education, Culture and Sports (15 April 1992 – 3 April 1993); as Minister of Culture and Education (3 April 1993 – 18 October 1994)
nb 3. As Minister of Culture and Media, 23 July 2020–present

== See also ==
- Vladimir Nazor Awards
- List of World Heritage Sites in Croatia
- Register of Cultural Goods of Croatia
- Register of Protected Natural Values of Croatia
