= Vladimir Šeks =

Croatian lawyer and politician

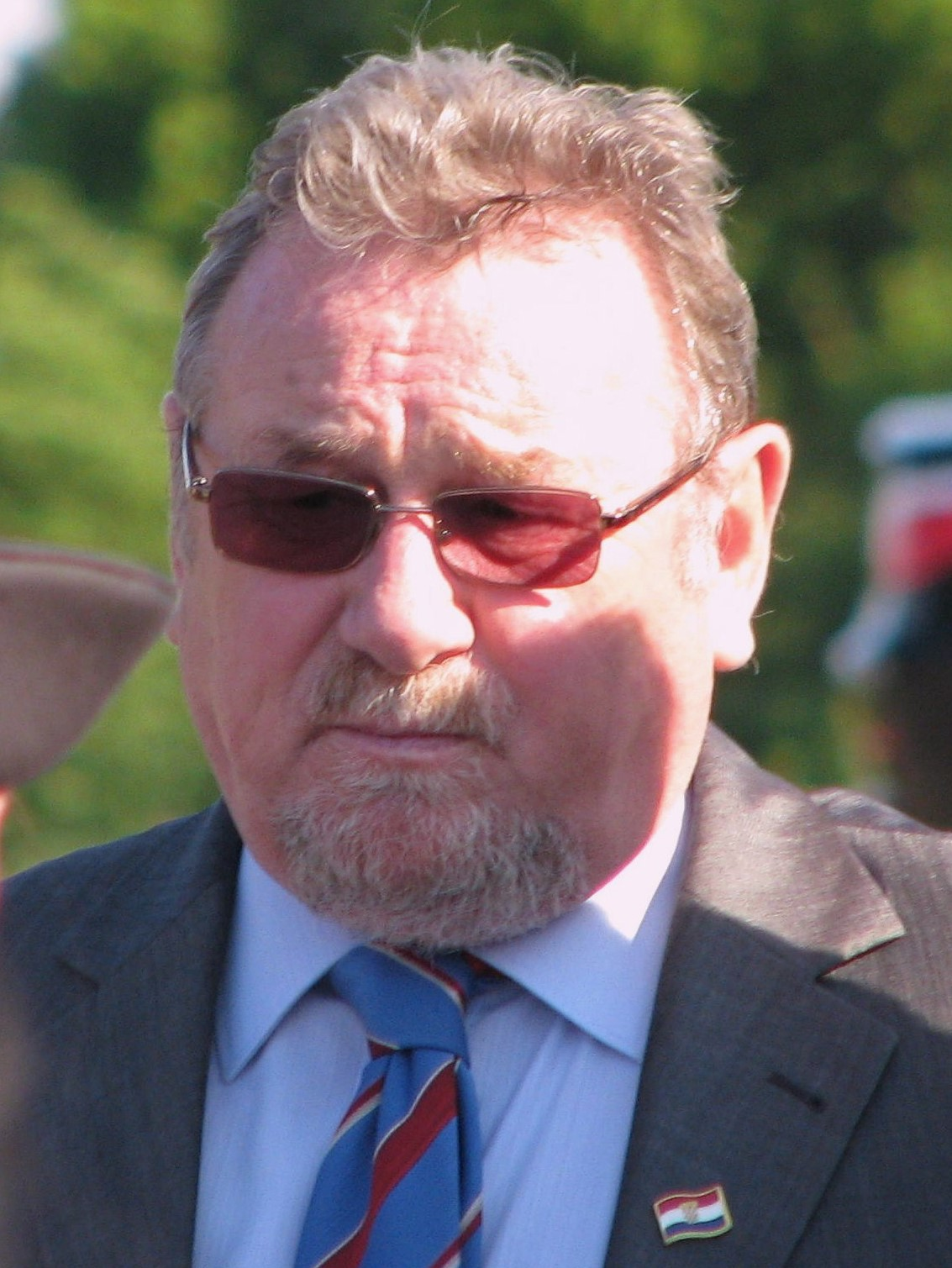
- Šeks in 2009

Speaker of the Croatian Parliament
- In office 22 December 2003 – 11 January 2008
- Preceded by: Zlatko Tomčić
- Succeeded by: Luka Bebić

Leader of the Opposition
- Acting
- In office 5 January 2000 – 30 April 2000
- Preceded by: Dražen Budiša
- Succeeded by: Ivo Sanader

President of the Croatian Democratic Union
- Acting
- In office 5 January 2000 – 30 April 2000
- Preceded by: Franjo Tuđman
- Succeeded by: Ivo Sanader

Deputy Prime Minister of Croatia
- In office 12 August 1992 – 20 September 1994
- Prime Minister: Hrvoje Šarinić; Nikica Valentić
- Preceded by: Zdravko Tomac
- Succeeded by: Jure Radić

Personal details
- Born: 1 January 1943 (age 83) Osijek, Independent State of Croatia (modern Croatia)
- Party: SKH (Before 1990); HDZ
- Education: University of Zagreb

Vladimir Šeks (born 1 January 1943) is a Croatian lawyer and politician. He has been a representative in the Croatian Parliament since the nation's independence, and has held the posts of the Speaker of the Parliament, as well as Deputy Prime Minister in the government. He also served as acting President of the Croatian Democratic Union and Leader of the Opposition from 5 January to 30 April 2000.

He graduated from the Zagreb Faculty of Law in 1966.

From 1972 to 1981, he worked as a lawyer until his arrest for "anti-state actions" against communist Yugoslavia. He served 13 months in the prison at Stara Gradiška. Later, he was an attorney for dissidents, including the "Belgrade Six" (1984–85).

In 1990, Šeks was one of the founders of the Osijek branch of the Croatian Democratic Union. In 1991, he was one of the main drafters of the Constitution of Croatia. In 1992, he was named the State Prosecutor of the Republic of Croatia. He was a deputy of the president of the government of Croatia under Hrvoje Šarinić and Nikica Valentić from 1992 to 1995. Šeks served as Speaker of the Croatian Parliament from 22 December 2003 until 11 January 2008.

His 25-year-old son Domagoj was found dead in Goa, India on 26 February 2005 after he was reported missing by friends a day earlier. The exact circumstances of his death were never determined.

In 2009, he testified in the Branimir Glavaš trial as a witness for the defence, and his testimony was later dismissed by the presiding judge as "completely implausible", and the court rendered a guilty verdict.

In 2010, Amnesty International issued a statement that Šeks should be prosecuted based upon testimony from the Glavaš trial.

In January 2011 the Ministry of Justice responded to the AI report saying their conclusions were "arbitrary and wrong" in the case of Šeks.

In 1997, Šeks declined to prosecute Miro Bajramović (a former police officer), Nebojša Hodak, Munib Suljić, and Igor Mikola, four members of the "Autumn Rains" unit of Tomislav Merčep during the Yugoslav wars. The men began running an elaborate detention center in Poljana Pakračka, southeast of Zagreb, where prisoners were tortured with electric shocks or doused with gasoline and burned alive. Bajramović said nearly all the prisoners were executed and buried in mass graves. They were also implied in the killing of the Serbian Zec family from Zagreb on 7 December 1991. Some of the men, including Bajramović, were later indicted and tried by local courts, but not the ICTY. Bajramović, who stated that his unit had killed 280 Serbian civilians in Poljana Pakračka and between 90 and 110 in Gospić, received a sentence of 12 years in prison.

== Honours ==
- Grand Order of King Dmitar Zvonimir (1995) – 4th-highest Croatian state award.
- Grand Order of King Petar Krešimir IV (2008) – 3rd-highest Croatian state award and the 16th of its kind awarded since its establishment.

Party political offices
Preceded by Franjo Tuđman	President of Croatian Democratic Union (acting); 5 January 2000 – 30 April 2000	Succeeded by Ivo Sanader
Political offices
Preceded by Zlatko Tomčić	Speaker of the Croatian Parliament; 22 December 2003 – 11 January 2008	Succeeded by Luka Bebić
