= Cabinet of Franjo Gregurić =

Croatian government (1991–1992)

Gregurić cabinet
- 3rd Cabinet of the Republic of Croatia

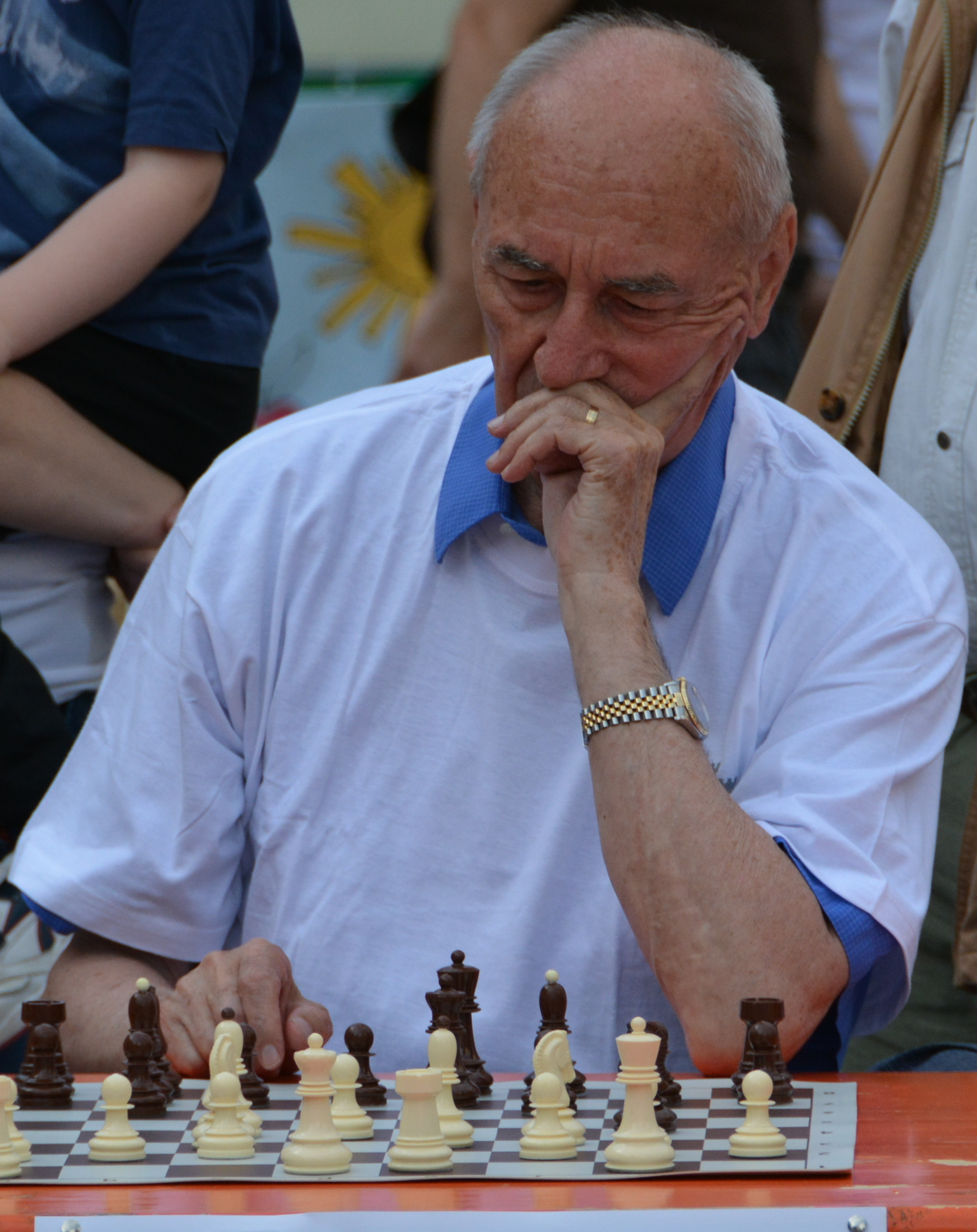
- Date formed: 17 July 1991
- Date dissolved: 12 August 1992

People and organisations
- Head of state: Franjo Tuđman
- Head of government: Franjo Gregurić
- Deputy head of government: Milan Ramljak; Mate Granić; Zdravko Tomac; Jurica Pavelić
- No. of ministers: 30 (on 12 August 1992)
- Ministers removed: 15
- Total no. of members: 45 (including former members)
- Member parties: Croatian Democratic Union (HDZ); Social Democratic Party of Croatia (SDP); Croatian Social Liberal Party (HSLS); Croatian People's Party (HNS); Croatian Christian Democratic Party (HKDS); Socialist Party of Croatia (SSH); Social Democratic Party of Croatia (SDSH); Croatian Democratic Party (HDS)
- Status in legislature: National Unity Government
- Opposition party: None

History
- Election: 1990 election
- Legislature term: 1990–1992
- Predecessor: Cabinet of Josip Manolić
- Successor: Cabinet of Hrvoje Šarinić

The Third Government of the Republic of Croatia (Croatian: Treća Vlada Republike Hrvatske) or The Government of National Unity (Croatian: Vlada nacionalnog jedinstva) was the Croatian Government cabinet led by Prime Minister Franjo Gregurić. It was announced on 17 July 1991 in response to the escalation of the Croatian War of Independence. It was the 3rd cabinet of Croatia since the first multi-party elections, and its term ended on 12 August 1992 after the first parliamentary election under the 1990 Croatian Constitution. During the term of this cabinet Croatia gained internationally diplomatic recognition and became a member of the United Nations.

A major reshuffle in its make-up came in mid-April 1992, when government ministers Enzo Tireli, Vlatko Pavletić, Bernardo Jurlina, Petar Kriste, Ivan Vekić and Ante Čović left the cabinet and were replaced by Franjo Kajfež, Vesna Girardi-Jurkić, Josip Juras, Branko Mikša, Ivan Jarnjak and Jure Radić. In addition, three new ministers without portfolio were named on the same day: Ivica Crnić, Darko Čargonja and Mladen Vedriš.

== List of ministers and portfolios ==
The periods in the table fall outside the cabinet's term when the minister listed also served in the preceding or the subsequent cabinets.

Name	Party	Portfolio	Period
Franjo Gregurić	HDZ	Prime Minister	17 July 1991 – 12 August 1992
Mate Granić	HDZ	Deputy Prime Minister	31 July 1991 – 27 January 2000
Jurica Pavelić	HDZ	Deputy Prime Minister	15 November 1991 – 12 August 1992
Milan Ramljak	Non-partisan (later HDZ)	Deputy Prime Minister	31 May 1990 – 12 August 1992
Zdravko Tomac	SDP	Deputy Prime Minister	31 July 1991 – 26 June 1992
Enzo Tireli	SDP	Minister of Energy and Industry	2 August 1991 – 15 April 1992
Franjo Kajfež	HDZ	Minister of Energy and Industry	15 April 1992 – 3 April 1993
Jozo Martinović	Non-partisan (later HDZ)	Minister of Finance	17 July 1991 – 12 August 1992
Stjepan Zdunić	Non-partisan (later HDZ)	Minister without portfolio	31 August – 14 December 1991
Stjepan Zdunić	Non-partisan (later HDZ)	Minister of Economic Development	15 December 1991 – 12 August 1992
Branko Salaj	HDZ	Minister of Information	27 August 1991 – 12 August 1992
Zdravko Sančević	HDZ	Minister of Emigration	2 December 1991 – 12 August 1992
Gojko Šušak	HDZ	Minister of Emigration	2 August – 18 September 1991
Gojko Šušak	HDZ	Minister of Defence	18 September 1991 – 3 May 1998
Luka Bebić	HDZ	Minister of Defence	17 July – 18 September 1991
Slavko Degoricija	HDZ	Minister without portfolio	17 – 31 July 1991
Slavko Degoricija	HDZ	Minister of Reconstruction	31 December 1991 – 12 August 1992
Ivan Tarnaj	HDZ	Minister of Agriculture, Forestry and Water Resources	31 May 1990 – 12 August 1992
Davorin Rudolf	Non-partisan (later HDZ)	Minister of Maritime Affairs	1 August 1991 – 12 August 1992
Bosiljko Mišetić	HNS (later HDZ)	Minister of Justice and Administration	17 July 1991 – 14 May 1992
Ivan Milas	HDZ	Minister of Justice	8 June – 12 August 1992
Josip Božičević	Non-partisan (later HDZ)	Minister of Transportation and Communications	25 July 1990 – 12 August 1992
Vlatko Pavletić	Non-partisan (later HDZ)	Minister of Education, Culture and Sports	31 May 1990 – 15 April 1992
Vesna Girardi-Jurkić	HDZ	Minister of Education, Culture and Sports	15 April 1992 – 18 October 1994
Bernardo Jurlina	HDZ	Minister of Labour, Social Welfare and Family	4 March 1991 – 15 April 1992
Josip Juras	HDZ	Minister of Labour, Social Welfare and Family	15 April 1992 – 12 October 1993
Petar Kriste	HDZ	Minister of Commerce	24 August 1990 – 15 April 1992
Branko Mikša	HDZ	Minister of Commerce	15 April – 12 August 1992
Anton Marčelo Popović		Minister of Tourism	16 September 1991 – 12 August 1992
Ivan Vekić	HDZ	Minister of the Interior	31 July 1991 – 14 April 1992
Ivan Jarnjak	HDZ	Minister of the Interior	14 April 1992 – 12 December 1996
Zvonimir Šeparović	HDZ	Minister of Foreign Affairs	31 July 1991 – 27 May 1992
Zdenko Škrabalo	HDZ	Minister of Foreign Affairs	9 June 1992 – 27 May 1993
Ivan Cifrić	SSH	Minister of Environment, Physical Planning and Construction	2 August 1991 – 12 August 1992
Andrija Hebrang	HDZ	Minister of Health	30 May 1990 – 12 August 1992
Osman Muftić	HDZ	Minister of Science, Technology and Informatics	30 May 1990 – 31 July 1991
Ante Čović	SDSH (later HDZ)	Minister of Science, Technology and Informatics	31 July 1991 – 14 April 1992
Jure Radić	HDZ	Minister of Science, Technology and Informatics	14 April – 7 August 1992
Zvonimir Baletić	SDSH (later HDZ)	Minister without portfolio	2 August 1991 – 12 August 1992
Dražen Budiša	HSLS	Minister without portfolio	2 August 1991 – 20 February 1992
Ivan Cesar	HKDS	Minister without portfolio	2 August 1991 – 3 June 1992
Ivica Crnić	HDZ	Minister without portfolio	15 April – 12 August 1992
Darko Čargonja	HDZ	Minister without portfolio	15 April – 12 August 1992
Živko Juzbašić	Non-partisan	Minister without portfolio	31 July 1991 – 12 August 1992
Mladen Vedriš	HDZ	Minister without portfolio	15 April – 12 August 1992
Vladimir Veselica	HDS (later HDZ)	Minister without portfolio	31 July – 2 December 1991
Muhamed Zulić	HDZ	Minister without portfolio	31 July 1991 – 12 August 1992
Gordan Radin	HDZ	Government secretary	3 September 1991 – 31 August 1992
