= Dražen Budiša =

Croatian politician

Member of the Croatian Parliament
- In office 7 September 1992 – 23 December 2003
- Constituency: II electoral district

Leader of the Opposition
- In office 12 August 1992 – 27 January 2000
- Prime Minister: Hrvoje Šarinić; Nikica Valentić; Zlatko Mateša
- Preceded by: National unity government
- Succeeded by: Vladimir Šeks (acting)

President of the Croatian Social Liberal Party
- In office 2 February 2002 – 7 December 2003
- Preceded by: Jozo Radoš (acting)
- Succeeded by: Ivan Čehok (acting)
- In office November 1997 – 11 July 2001
- Preceded by: Vlado Gotovac
- Succeeded by: Jozo Radoš (acting)
- In office 1990 – February 1996
- Preceded by: Slavko Goldstein
- Succeeded by: Vlado Gotovac

Deputy Prime Minister of Croatia
- In office 21 March 2002 – 30 July 2002
- Prime Minister: Ivica Račan
- Preceded by: Goran Granić
- Succeeded by: Goran Granić

Personal details
- Born: 25 July 1948 (age 78) Drniš, PR Croatia, FPR Yugoslavia
- Party: Croatian Social Liberal Party
- Spouse: Nada Budiša
- Children: 1
- Education: University of Zagreb

Dražen Budiša (born 25 July 1948) is a Croatian politician who used to be a leading opposition figure in the 1990s and a two-time presidential candidate. As president of the Croatian Social Liberal Party through the 1990s he remains to date the only Leader of the Opposition not to have been from either the Croatian Democratic Union or the Social Democratic Party.

== Biography ==
=== During Yugoslavia ===
Budiša was born in Drniš, People's Republic of Croatia, within the Federal People's Republic of Yugoslavia. He studied Philosophy and Sociology at the Faculty of Philosophy in Zagreb and took part in the Croatian Spring in the 1970s. For his activities he was later sent to Lepoglava prison by Communist authorities. Before the arrival of democracy he worked as a librarian. In 1989 he was one of the founders of Croatian Social Liberal Party and later its leader. During the 1990 elections his party joined the Coalition of People's Accord and fared badly, including Budiša who failed to win a seat.

=== As leader of opposition ===
In August 1991, during the war, Budiša became a minister in war-time cabinet of Franjo Gregurić. In February 1992, he was the first ministers to break ranks, being opposed to the constitutional laws guaranteeing political autonomy of ethnic Serbs in exchange for their formal recognition of Croatian sovereignty. He announced his decision to resign during televised session of the Croatian Parliament, and thus became rallying point for many Croatians dissatisfied with the policies of Franjo Tuđman.

Although he lost the presidential election of 1992 to Tuđman, he confirmed his status of opposition leader, beating many other, presumably more charismatic leaders like Savka Dabčević-Kučar and Dobroslav Paraga. His HSLS party also fared relatively well at those elections and later had even better results few months later on Chamber of Counties, regional and local elections, when HSLS reached its zenith.

In 1995, the united opposition won local elections for Zagreb and HSLS suggested a mayor. However, Franjo Tuđman abused his powers - starting the Zagreb Crisis - and blocked four HSLS mayors suggested, including Budiša.

This rise of HSLS proved to be short-lived. On the 1995 parliamentary elections many of its voters switched to rejuvenated Social Democratic Party of Croatia (SDP) and a centrist coalition. Still, HSLS remained the strongest opposition party in the lower house of the parliament. Two years later, the dissipation continued on local elections. Budiša reacted by floating plans for coalition government with Tuđman's Croatian Democratic Union (HDZ), hoping to attract their voters. This led to a split with Vladimir Gotovac and creation of Liberal Party who opposed the HDZ's right politics.

=== Coalition with SDP and the new government ===
After that Budiša finally realised that the only way to get power lies in a broad coalition of all opposition parties, including SDP. He and Ivica Račan signed the coalition agreement in 1998 and convincingly won at the 2000 parliamentary election.

This triumph was marred by Budiša's loss to Stjepan Mesić in the presidential elections held two weeks later. Budiša, who tried to woo followers of Franjo Tuđman during the second round, was embittered by this defeat and this led to his party turning increasingly right-wing and later squabbles with his government coalition partners. This resulted with his resignation from the post of president of HSLS on 12 July 2001 over a dispute with SDP about whether to send Croatian generals to ICTY. Jozo Radoš was chosen to act instead of him.

Budiša was resentful of having no post in the new government and publicly forced Račan to dismiss Goran Granić, the deputy prime minister and HSLS party member in order to put Budiša at that position, at which he remained for only a short time.

One of the points on which Budiša clashed with Mesić (and later Račan) was cooperation with ICTY. All this escalated in 2002 when Budiša and his party left the government in an unsuccessful bid to force new elections. The ultimate result was yet another fragmentation of his party and the formation of the Party of Liberal Democrats who supported the government.

=== Fall from politics ===
Back in opposition, Budiša first quit his party, and dramatically returned a year later – which was seen as a staged event – and then tried to return to power by forming a centre-right bloc together with the new Democratic Centre of Mate Granić. In the 2003 parliamentary elections, this bloc fared badly, winning only three seats, with neither for the two party leaders. Although those three seats later proved crucial in helping Ivo Sanader to form a parliamentary majority, Budiša, like Granić, took responsibility for the disaster and on 17 December 2003 resigned party leadership. In 2009 after Darinko Kosor became the HSLS president, Budiša made a short comeback to politics and in the 2011 parliamentary elections he led the HSLS election list as number one in the ninth electoral district but in the elections HSLS didn't manage to win any seats in the parliament for the first time In Croatian parliamentary history. Soon after he left the party and retired from politics.

Party political offices
Preceded by Slavko Goldstein	President of Croatian Social Liberal Party; 1990 – February 1996	Succeeded by Vlado Gotovac
Preceded by Vlado Gotovac	President of Croatian Social Liberal Party; November 1997 – 11 July 2001	Succeeded by Jozo Radoš (acting)
Preceded by Jozo Radoš (acting)	President of Croatian Social Liberal Party; March 2002 – 17 December 2003	Succeeded by Ivan Čehok (acting)
Political offices
Preceded by N/A	Minister without Portfolio; 2 August 1991 – 20 February 1992	Succeeded by N/A
