= Prime Minister of Croatia =

Head of government

President of the Government of the Republic of Croatia
- Predsjednik Vlade Republike Hrvatske
- Croatian government presidency flag

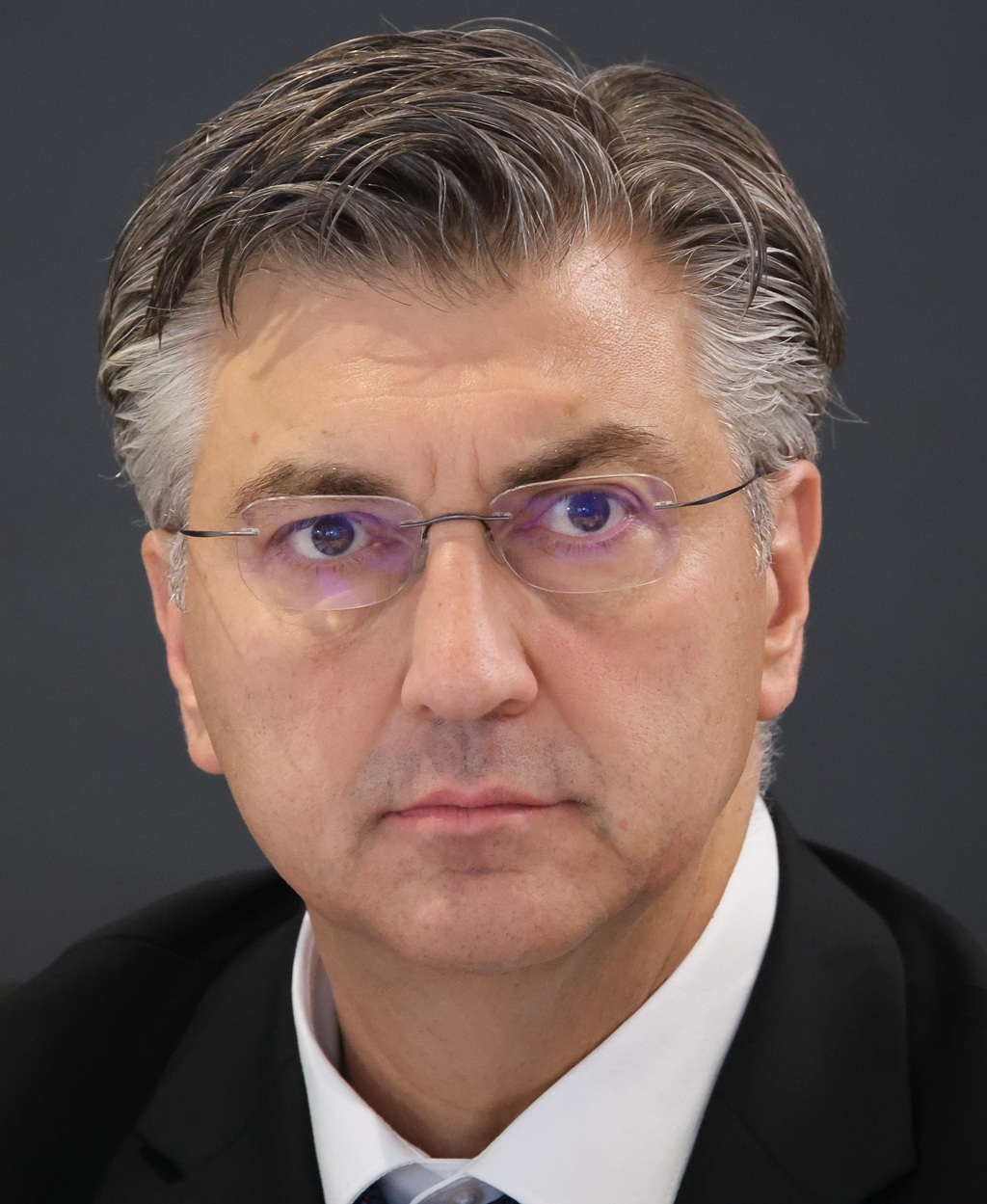
- Incumbent; Andrej Plenković since 19 October 2016
- Government of Croatia; Office of the President of the Government
- Style: Mr. Prime Minister; Premier; President of the Government; His Excellency (diplomatic)
- Type: Head of Government
- Member of: Government of Croatia; European Council (EU); Euro summit (EU); National Security Council
- Reports to: Croatian Parliament
- Seat: Banski Dvori; Zagreb, Croatia
- Nominator: President of Croatia
- Appointer: Croatian Parliament
- Term length: Not fixed, remains in office if able to command a parliamentary majority
- Constituting instrument: Constitution of Croatia
- Inaugural holder: Stjepan Mesić (by Amendment LXXIII); Josip Manolić (by Constitution)
- Formation: 25 July 1990 (Amendment LXXIII); 22 December 1990 (Constitution)
- Deputy: Deputy Prime Minister
- Salary: €66,400 (annual)
- Website: vlada.gov.hr

The prime minister of Croatia, officially the president of the government of the Republic of Croatia (Croatian: Predsjednik / Predsjednica Vlade Republike Hrvatske), is the head of government of Croatia. Due to the office's broad authority over government affairs, it is considered the most powerful seat in the Croatian political system. From 1990 to 2000 – during the semi-presidential period – the president of Croatia held de facto executive authority. The position of prime minister ranks third in the Croatian order of precedence, following the Croatian President and Croatian Parliament Speaker. The prime minister leads the Government of Croatia and meets in Banski dvori, on St. Mark's Square in Zagreb.

The Constitution of Croatia prescribes that the Croatian Parliament supervises the Croatian Government, including the prime minister; the Croatian President ensures "regular functioning" of the government, such as appointing the prime minister. Since 2000, the prime minister has had a variety of constitutional powers expanded. The prime minister directs domestic policy, defence policy, and foreign policy; administers public services, and oversees the economic policy of Croatia. They propose the annual budget alongside similar legislation to parliament and appoint government ministers, some of which alongside the Croatian President. As head of government, the prime minister defers certain responsibilities to the head of state – the president. These include commanding the Croatian Armed Forces, jointly calling elections and referendums, as well as collaborating on defence and foreign policy.

== Name ==
The official name of the office, literally translated, is "President of the Government" (Predsjednik / Predsjednica Vlade), rather than a literal translation of "Prime Minister" (Prvi Ministar). In Croatian, the shorter term Premijer / Premijerka (Premier) is commonly used as well.

== History ==
The development of the modern role of prime minister traces back to Croatia's first multi-party elections 1990, after constitutional amendments allowed for greater electoral representation. The nation was still a constituent republic of SFR Yugoslavia and established the position of the President of the Executive Council of the Socialist Republic of Croatia; a role initially was filled by Stjepan Mesić on 30 May 1990 (the 14th Executive Council). The newly-elected Croatian Parliament enacted numerous amendments to the constitution on 25 July 1990. It eliminated socialist references and adopted new national symbols, while the Government of the Republic of Croatia was formally instituted by Amendment LXXIII.

The Constitution of Croatia was subsequently also changed significantly on 22 December 1990, as the so-called "Christmas Constitution" fundamentally defined the Republic of Croatia and its governmental structure. From this point onwards, Croatia was a semi-presidential republic, which meant the president of Croatia had broad executive powers, including the appointment and dismissal of the prime minister and other officials in the government.

Following the May 1991 independence referendum in which 93% of voters approved secession, Croatia formally proclaimed independence from Yugoslavia on 25 June 1991, with Josip Manolić continuing in the role of prime minister as head of government of an independent Croatia. The country then signed the July 1991 Brijuni Agreement in which it agreed to postpone further activities towards severing ties with Yugoslavia. Meanwhile, the Croatian War of Independence ensued, and Franjo Gregurić was appointed to lead a Government of National Unity. In October the same year, Croatia formally severed all remaining legal ties with the Yugoslav Federation.

During the period between 1990 and the next constitutional amendments in late 2000, Croatia had seven prime ministers. Following the January 2000 general election the winning centre-left coalition led by the Social Democratic Party amended the Constitution and effectively stripped the President of most of his executive powers, strengthening the role of the Parliament and the prime minister, turning Croatia into a parliamentary republic. The prime minister again (as before 1990) became the foremost post in Croatian politics.

As of 2025 there have been 12 Prime Ministers who have chaired 16 governments since the first multi-party elections. Nine prime ministers were members of the Croatian Democratic Union during their terms of office, two were members of the Social Democratic Party and one was not a member of any political party. Since independence there has been one female prime minister (Jadranka Kosor).

== List of prime ministers ==
=== Socialist Republic of Croatia (1990–1991) ===
| No. | Portrait | Name (birth–death) | Election | Term of office | | | Party | Cabinet | Composition | President (Term) |
| No. | Portrait | Name (birth–death) | Election | Term start | Term end | Duration | Party | Cabinet | Composition | President (Term) |
|---|---|---|---|---|---|---|---|---|---|---|
| 1 | | Stjepan Mesić (1934–) | 1990 | 30 May 1990 | 24 August 1990 | 86 days | HDZ; Croatian Democratic Union | Mesić | HDZ | Franjo; Tuđman (1990–1999) |
| 2 | | Josip Manolić (1920–2024) | — | 24 August 1990 | 25 June 1991 | 305 days | HDZ; Croatian Democratic Union | Manolić | HDZ | Franjo; Tuđman (1990–1999) |

=== Republic of Croatia (1991–present) ===
Croatia formally declared itself independent on 25 June 1991. After the declaration of independence, the position continued to be named the Prime Minister of the Republic of Croatia.

| No. | Portrait | Name (birth–death) | Election | Term of office | | | Party | Cabinet | Composition | President (Term) |
| No. | Portrait | Name (birth–death) | Election | Term start | Term end | Duration | Party | Cabinet | Composition | President (Term) |
|---|---|---|---|---|---|---|---|---|---|---|
| 2 | | Josip Manolić (1920–2024) | — | 25 June 1991 | 17 July 1991 | 22 days | HDZ; Croatian Democratic Union | Manolić | HDZ | Franjo; Tuđman (1990–1999) |
| 3 | | Franjo Gregurić (Note: Served as Prime Minister on 8 October 1991, when the three-month moratorium on the declaration expired and the Croatian Parliament formally severed all remaining constitutional and legal ties with SFR Yugoslavia.) (1939–) | — | 17 July 1991 | 12 August 1992 | 1 year, 26 days | HDZ; Croatian Democratic Union | Gregurić | HDZ • SDP • HSLS • HNS • HKDS • HDS • SDSH • SSH | Franjo; Tuđman (1990–1999) |
| 4 | | Hrvoje Šarinić (1935–2017) | 1992 | 12 August 1992 | 3 April 1993 | 234 days | HDZ; Croatian Democratic Union | Šarinić | HDZ | Franjo; Tuđman (1990–1999) |
| 5 | | Nikica Valentić (1950–2023) | — | 3 April 1993 | 7 November 1995 | 2 years, 218 days | HDZ; Croatian Democratic Union | Valentić | From 3 April 1993 to 31 December 1994: HDZ • HSS | Franjo; Tuđman (1990–1999) |
| 5 | | Nikica Valentić (1950–2023) | — | 3 April 1993 | 7 November 1995 | 2 years, 218 days | HDZ; Croatian Democratic Union | Valentić | From 31 December 1994 to 7 November 1995: HDZ | Franjo; Tuđman (1990–1999) |
| 6 | | Zlatko Mateša (1949–) | 1995 | 7 November 1995 | 27 January 2000 | 4 years, 81 days | HDZ; Croatian Democratic Union | Mateša | HDZ | Franjo; Tuđman (1990–1999) |
| 6 | | Zlatko Mateša (1949–) | 1995 | 7 November 1995 | 27 January 2000 | 4 years, 81 days | HDZ; Croatian Democratic Union | Mateša | HDZ | Stjepan; Mesić (2000–2010) |
| 7 | | Ivica Račan (1944–2007) | 2000 | 27 January 2000 | 23 December 2003 | 3 years, 330 days | SDP; Social Democratic Party | Račan I | SDP • HSLS • HNS • HSS • IDS • LS | Stjepan; Mesić (2000–2010) |
| 7 | | Ivica Račan (1944–2007) | 2000 | 27 January 2000 | 23 December 2003 | 3 years, 330 days | SDP; Social Democratic Party | Račan II | SDP • HSS • HNS • Libra • LS | Stjepan; Mesić (2000–2010) |
| 8 | | Ivo Sanader (1953–) | 2003 | 23 December 2003 | 6 July 2009 | 5 years, 195 days | HDZ; Croatian Democratic Union | Sanader I | HDZ • DC | Stjepan; Mesić (2000–2010) |
| 8 | | Ivo Sanader (1953–) | 2007 | 23 December 2003 | 6 July 2009 | 5 years, 195 days | HDZ; Croatian Democratic Union | Sanader II | HDZ • HSLS • HSS • SDSS | Stjepan; Mesić (2000–2010) |
| 9 | | Jadranka Kosor (1953–) | — | 6 July 2009 | 23 December 2011 | 2 years, 170 days | HDZ; Croatian Democratic Union | Kosor | HDZ • HSLS • HSS • SDSS | Stjepan; Mesić (2000–2010) |
| 9 | | Jadranka Kosor (1953–) | — | 6 July 2009 | 23 December 2011 | 2 years, 170 days | HDZ; Croatian Democratic Union | Kosor | HDZ • HSLS • HSS • SDSS | Ivo; Josipović (2010–2015) |
| 10 | | Zoran Milanović (1966–) | 2011 | 23 December 2011 | 22 January 2016 | 4 years, 30 days | SDP; Social Democratic Party | Milanović | SDP • HNS • IDS | Ivo; Josipović (2010–2015) |
| 10 | | Zoran Milanović (1966–) | 2011 | 23 December 2011 | 22 January 2016 | 4 years, 30 days | SDP; Social Democratic Party | Milanović | SDP • HNS • IDS | Kolinda; Grabar; Kitarović (2015–2020) |
| 11 | | Tihomir Orešković (1966–) | 2015 | 22 January 2016 | 19 October 2016 | 271 days | Independent | Orešković | HDZ • MOST | Kolinda; Grabar; Kitarović (2015–2020) |
| 12 | | Andrej Plenković (1970–) | 2016 | 19 October 2016 | Incumbent | 10 years, 33 days | HDZ; Croatian Democratic Union | Plenković I | From 19 October 2016 to 28 April 2017: HDZ • MOST | Kolinda; Grabar; Kitarović (2015–2020) |
| 12 | | Andrej Plenković (1970–) | 2016 | 19 October 2016 | Incumbent | 10 years, 33 days | HDZ; Croatian Democratic Union | Plenković I | From 28 April to 9 June 2017: HDZ | Kolinda; Grabar; Kitarović (2015–2020) |
| 12 | | Andrej Plenković (1970–) | 2016 | 19 October 2016 | Incumbent | 10 years, 33 days | HDZ; Croatian Democratic Union | Plenković I | From 9 June 2017 to 23 July 2020: HDZ • HNS | Zoran; Milanović (2020–present) |
| 12 | | Andrej Plenković (1970–) | 2020 | 19 October 2016 | Incumbent | 10 years, 33 days | HDZ; Croatian Democratic Union | Plenković II | HDZ • SDSS | Zoran; Milanović (2020–present) |
| 12 | | Andrej Plenković (1970–) | 2024 | 19 October 2016 | Incumbent | 10 years, 33 days | HDZ; Croatian Democratic Union | Plenković III | HDZ • DP | Zoran; Milanović (2020–present) |

Notes

1. From 1990 until the constitutional changes enacted in 2000, which replaced a powerful semi-presidential system (de facto a superpresidential system) with an incomplete parliamentary system, the term of the Prime Minister legally began on the date on which he was appointed by the President of the Republic and not on the date when he received a vote of confidence in Parliament, as is the case since 2000.
2. Until 12 October 2010.

== Timeline ==
This is a graphical lifespan timeline of prime ministers of Croatia. They are listed in order of office.

== Spouses of prime ministers ==
| Name | Relation to Prime Minister |
|---|---|
| Milka Mesić (née Dudunić) | wife of Prime Minister Stjepan Mesić |
| Marija Eker Manolić | wife of Prime Minister Josip Manolić |
| Jozefina Gregurić (née Abramović) | wife of Prime Minister Franjo Gregurić |
| Erika Šarinić | wife of Prime Minister Hrvoje Šarinić |
| Antonela Valentić | wife of Prime Minister Nikica Valentić |
| Sanja Gregurić-Mateša | wife of Prime Minister Zlatko Mateša |
| Dijana Pleština | wife of Prime Minister Ivica Račan |
| Mirjana Sanader (née Šarić) | wife of Prime Minister Ivo Sanader |
| | Jadranka Kosor divorced before becoming prime minister |
| Sanja Musić Milanović | wife of Prime Minister Zoran Milanović |
| Sanja Dujmović Orešković | wife of Prime Minister Tihomir Orešković |
| Ana Maslać Plenković | wife of Prime Minister Andrej Plenković |

== See also ==
- List of cabinets of Croatia
- List of Croatian prime ministers by time in office
- President of Croatia
  - List of presidents of Croatia
- Speaker of the Croatian Parliament
- Secretary of the League of Communists of Croatia
- Politics of Croatia
- List of heads of state of Yugoslavia
- Prime Minister of Yugoslavia
- 2020 St. Mark's Square attack
