= Vesna Girardi-Jurkić =

Croatian archaeologist and politician (1944–2012)

Minister of Education, Culture and Sports
- In office 15 April 1992 – 3 April 1993
- Prime Minister: Franjo Gregurić (1992); Hrvoje Šarinić (1992–1993)
- Preceded by: Vlatko Pavletić

Minister of Culture and Education
- In office 3 April 1993 – 18 October 1994
- Prime Minister: Nikica Valentić
- Succeeded by: Zlatko Vitez

Personal details
- Born: 15 January 1944 Zagreb, Independent State of Croatia
- Died: 25 August 2012 (aged 68) Pula, Croatia
- Party: None (formerly Croatian Democratic Union and Democratic Centre)
- Education: University of Zagreb (Faculty of Humanities and Social Sciences)

Vesna Girardi-Jurkić (15 January 1944 – 25 August 2012) was a Croatian archeologist and museologist. She formerly served as the Croatian Minister of Education, Culture and Sport in the period between April 1992 and October 1994 in the cabinets of Prime Ministers Franjo Gregurić, Hrvoje Šarinić and Nikica Valentić. She was the first woman to be appointed a minister in a Croatian cabinet since independence.

Born in Zagreb in 1944, her family moved to Pula in 1947, where she finished high school. Girardi-Jurkić went on to graduate from the Faculty of Humanities and Social Sciences at the University of Zagreb in 1968, majoring in archeology and English. Between 1969 and 1991 she held various positions at the Archeological Museum of Istria in Pula. In 1992 she was appointed Minister of Education, Culture and Sport and held the post until 1994, when she was named Croatia's Permanent Delegate to UNESCO.

In 2001 she briefly returned to the Archeological Museum of Istria before going on to head the International Research Centre for Archaeology Brijuni-Medulin. Her primary interest is the study of archeological sites from classical antiquity around Istria. She authored several books about the subject.

Political offices
Preceded by Vlatko Pavletić	Minister of Education, Culture and Sports; 1992–1994	Succeeded by Zlatko Vitez as Minister of Culture
Preceded by Vlatko Pavletić	Minister of Education, Culture and Sports; 1992–1994	Succeeded by Ljilja Vokić as Minister of Education and Sports
