= Croatian Health Insurance Fund =

Health insurance fund

Croatian Health Insurance Fund Hrvatski zavod za zdravstveno osiguranje

Institution overview
- Formed: 21 August 1993; 33 years ago
- Type: National social health insurance fund of Croatia
- Headquarters: Klovićeva 1, Zagreb, Croatia
- Budget: €7.07 billion (2026 budget)
- Website: hzzo.hr

Director
- Currently: Zvonimir Ante Korda since 11 February 2026

The Croatian Health Insurance Fund (Croatian: Hrvatski zavod za zdravstveno osiguranje or HZZO) is a state-owned enterprise that administers the universal health care system in Croatia. Established in 1993 by the Government of Croatia, the HZZO is the country's national social health insurance fund and its primary source of health financing. In 2019, 4.18 million people received health insurance coverage through HZZO.

== Organization ==
The HZZO is overseen by a director and a board of directors, appointed by the Croatian government on the recommendation of the Minister of Health. These directors represent the insured population, the Ministry of Health, the Ministry of Finance and independent general practitioners. A central office located in the Croatian capital of Zagreb, sets policies that are implemented by branch offices in each of the country's 21 counties.

All health care providers that receive public funds are required to negotiate annual contracts with the HZZO that set prices and payment plans.

== Funding ==
Compulsory health insurance contributions form 76% of the fund's income. About a third of the population - those in employment - are liable to pay full contributions.

== History ==
The Constitution of Croatia, adopted in December 1990, declared that health care is a human right.

In 1993, the HZZO was created by the Croatian Parliament in order to consolidate the fragmented and decentralized health care system which had been inherited from the Socialist Federal Republic of Yugoslavia. The 1993 law recognized patient choice as a principle through a mandatory payroll tax of 15% and allowing the use of private supplementary plans. The Health Care Law of 1993 also guaranteed patients rights which includes access to information about their health, and the ability to refuse examination and treatment.

In July 2001, the Ministry of Health under Ana Stavljenić-Rukavina issued a policy statement entitled "The Strategy and Plan for the Reform of the Health Care System and Health Insurance of the Republic of Croatia." Noting that such factors as the country's aging and the generous benefits established since 1993 threatened the fund's sustainability, the paper proposed reducing the amount of basic services that are free at the point of use, which would result in the HZZO becoming less dependent on payroll contributions. In order to increase revenue, the 2002 Health Insurance Law introduced higher copayments for hospital and specialist services. These services include diagnostic tests and prescription drugs. It also created a voluntary insurance policy that would complement the mandatory coverage each citizen received. After 2002, citizens were no longer allowed to opt out of the public insurance system.
