= Government of Croatia =

Main executive branch of government in Croatia

Government of the Republic of Croatia
- Vlada Republike Hrvatske (Croatian)

Overview
- Established: 30 May 1990; 36 years ago
- State: Republic of Croatia
- Leader: Prime Minister
- Ministries: 18 (since 2024)
- Responsible to: Croatian Parliament
- Headquarters: Banski dvori St. Mark's Square 2, Zagreb, Croatia
- Website: vlada.gov.hr

The Government of Croatia (Croatian: Vlada Hrvatske), formally the Government of the Republic of Croatia (Vlada Republike Hrvatske), commonly abbreviated to Croatian Government (hrvatska Vlada), is the main executive branch in Croatia. It is led by the president of the Government (predsjednik Vlade), informally abbreviated to premier (premijer) or prime minister. The prime minister is nominated by the president of the Republic from among those candidates who enjoy majority support in the Croatian Parliament (Sabor); the candidate is then chosen by the Parliament. There are 17 other government members, serving as deputy prime ministers, government ministers or both; they are chosen by the prime minister and confirmed by the Parliament. The Government of the Republic of Croatia exercises its executive powers in conformity with the Croatian Constitution and legislation enacted by the Croatian Parliament. The current government is led by Prime Minister Andrej Plenković.

Following the Croatian–Hungarian Settlement of 1868, the Kingdom of Croatia-Slavonia and the Government of the Land or officially the Royal Croatian-Slavonian-Dalmatian Government of the Land (Zemaljska vlada or Kraljevska hrvatsko-slavonsko-dalmatinska zemaljska vlada)—headed by a crown-appointed ban—were established. This government existed until the Austria-Hungary breakup and the Kingdom of Serbs, Croats and Slovenes' creation in 1918. In 1939, the Banovina of Croatia was established and a head of the Banovina of Croatia (Ban) was appointed by the crown, but no effective government was formed before World War II. In 1943, the ZAVNOH established an executive board to act as a new government. The Socialist Republic of Croatia, as a part of federal Yugoslavia, had a separate government (from 1953 to 1990 known as the Executive Council, appointed by the Sabor) with limited powers (excluding defence and foreign relations; this was similar to all the previous governmental forms). Following the first multi-party elections and the adoption of the present Constitution of Croatia in 1990, the present governmental form was adopted and Stjepan Mesić became the first person to lead a non-communist government (under Government of Yugoslavia), while Josip Manolić was the first prime minister of an independent Croatia. Since the introduction of multi-party democracy, the Republic of Croatia has had fourteen governments headed by twelve different prime ministers. Nine governments have been formed by the Croatian Democratic Union, three by the Social Democratic Party of Croatia, one was headed by a non-partisan prime minister and one was a national unity government (formed during the Croatian War of Independence's peak).

== Terminology ==
The term "government" in Croatia (Vlada) primarily refers to the executive branch, as used by the government itself, the press and colloquially, as that branch of the government (vlast) is responsible for day-to-day governance of the nation (uprava); this sense is intended when it is said that a political party forms the government.

== Structure and powers ==
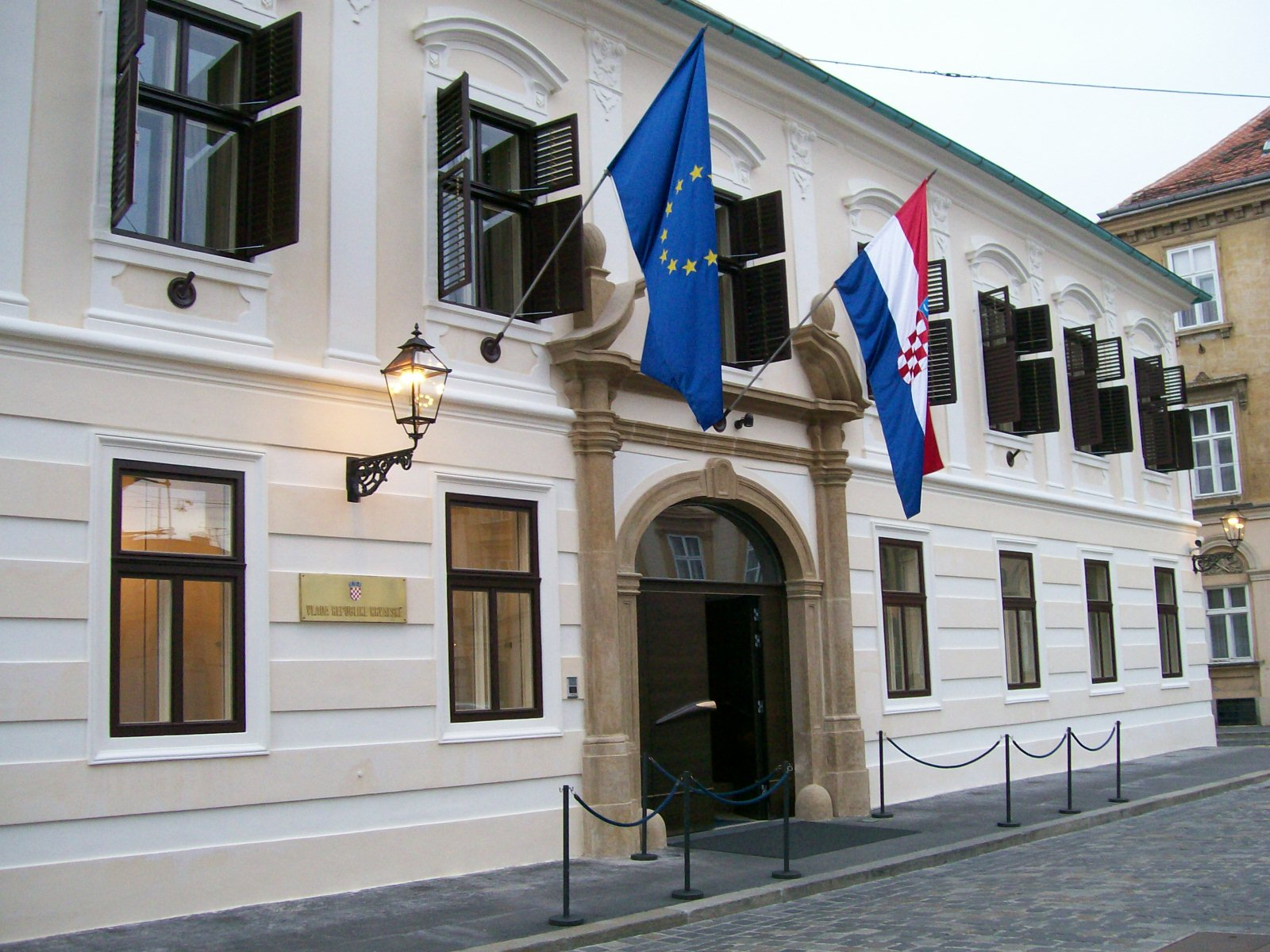
Banski dvori, headquarters of the Government of the Republic of Croatia

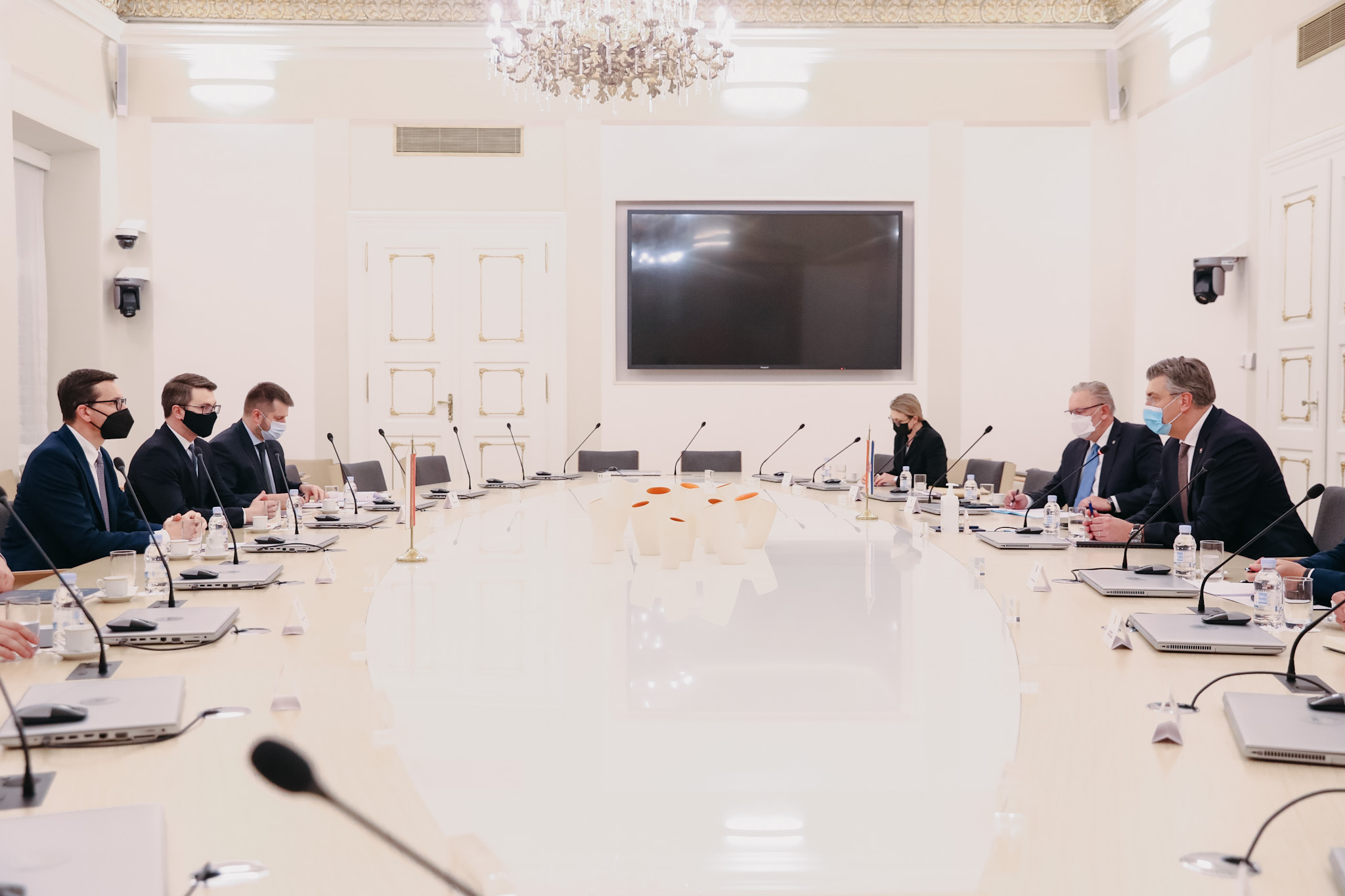
Ban Jelačić Hall, the main hall for bilateral meetings in Banski dvori complex

The government, the main executive power of the Croatian state, is headed by the prime minister (PM). The PM currently has seven deputies (elected by the Croatian Parliament), who also serve as government ministers; there are in total 18 ministers, who are appointed by the prime minister with the approval of the Sabor (by absolute majority vote). The government ministers are each in charge of a particular sector of activity such as Foreign Affairs. The prime minister and all the deputies form an inner cabinet, they are tasked with coordinating and supervising the work of government ministers on behalf of the PM; the inner cabinet also prepares materials for meetings of the full government cabinet (consisting of the inner cabinet and the remaining 11 ministers). The first deputy prime minister also discharges the duties of the prime minister when the latter is incapacitated or absent. State secretaries (Croatian: državni tajnici) are the highest officials below each minister. There are one or more State secretaries in the ministries. Each State secretary is appointed by the government for the term of the minister, and is responsible to the minister. They act as deputy ministers and attend meetings only exceptionally. State secretaries are also heads of the Central State Offices (see below).

The executive branch is responsible for proposing legislation and a budget, executing the laws and guiding the foreign and internal policies of the republic. The government's official residence is at the Banski dvori in Zagreb. Although the cabinet normally meets at the Banski dvori, occasionally its meetings are held elsewhere in the country.

The Government of the Republic of Croatia exercises its executive powers in conformity with the Croatian Constitution and legislation enacted by the Croatian Parliament, the Sabor (Croatian: Hrvatski sabor). Its structure, operational procedures and decision-making processes are defined by the Government of the Republic of Croatia Act (2011 with 2014 and 2016 amendments) and the Government Rules of Procedure (2015 with 2015 amendments). The Constitution mandates that the government proposes legislation and other documents to the parliament, proposes the budget and gives financial reports, implements Acts and other decisions of the parliament, enacts any regulations required to implement the Acts, defines foreign and internal policies, directs and oversees the operation of state administration, promotes the economic development of the country, directs the activities and development of public services and performs other activities conforming to the provisions of the Constitution and applicable legislation. The government also passes regulations and administrative acts and orders appointments and removals of appointed officials and civil servants within the scope of its powers. It makes rulings in cases of conflicts of jurisdiction between governmental institutions, responds to questions asked parliamentary majority and opposition representatives, prepares proposals of new legislation and other regulations, gives opinions on legislation and other regulations and adopts strategies for the economic and social development of the country.

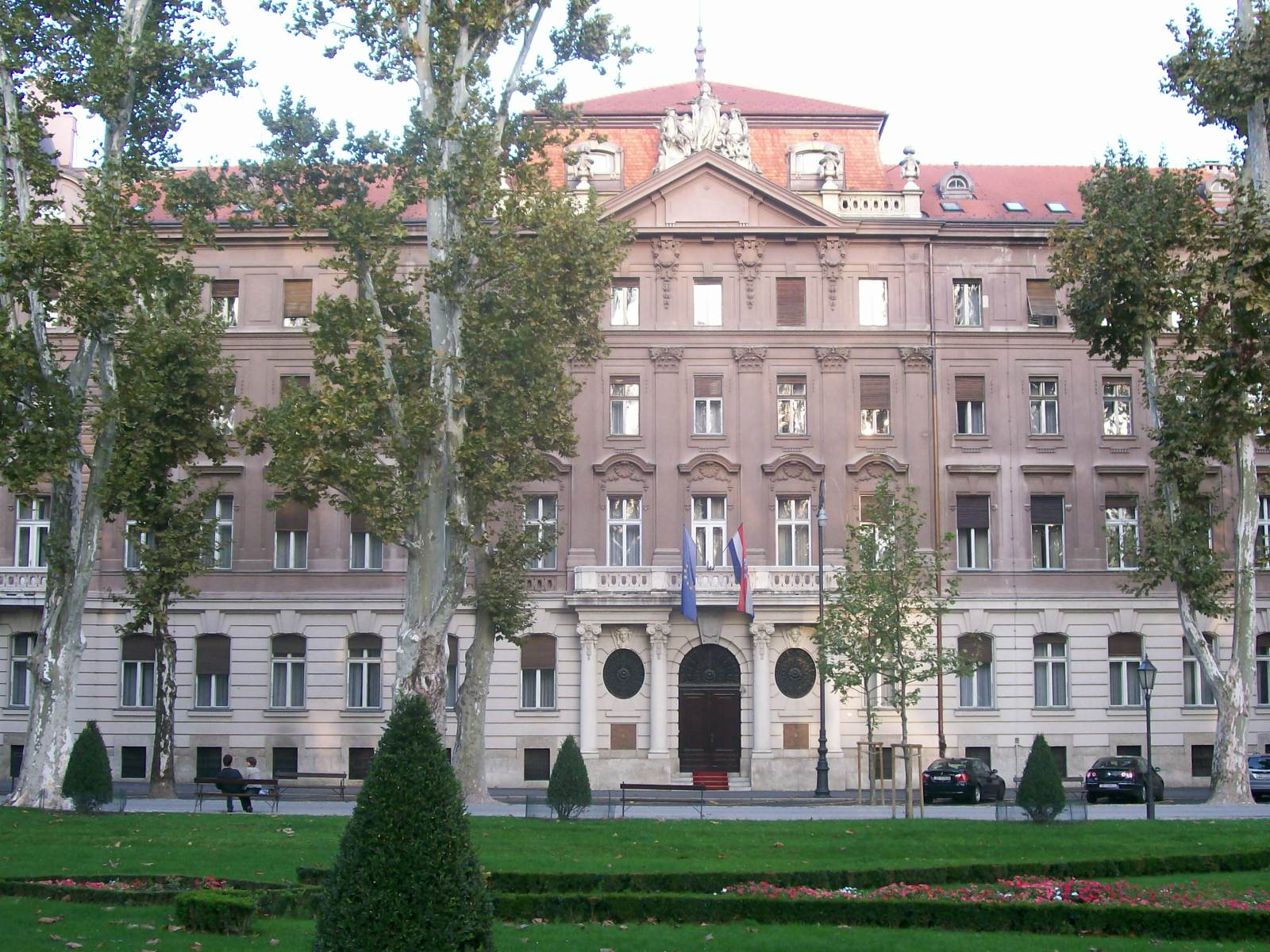
Ministry of Foreign and European Affairs building

The government manages state property of the Republic of Croatia unless special legislation provides otherwise. It may appoint special committees to manage the property on its behalf; this process is implemented through appointed members of supervisory boards and managing boards of companies partially or wholly owned by the Republic of Croatia. The government also determines these appointees' salaries. It maintains specialized bodies, agencies and offices—including the Legislation Office, the Office for Human Rights and the Rights of National Minorities and Public Relations Service—that are required by the Government Act of 2011, as well as committees to decide administrative matters. Various branches of government may establish joint services. There are further entities established by the government as companies designed to support the aims of the Government, such as the Croatian Bank for Reconstruction and Development that strives to fund the reconstruction and development of the economy of Croatia.

Local (city/municipality) and regional (county) governments are separate from the central government; county administrative bodies perform decentralized state administration duties alongside their regional self-governing functions under the supervision of the Ministry of Justice, Public Administration and Digital Transformation.

This is a responsible government to the Croatian Parliament, which may recall it as a whole or in part by an absolute majority vote (majority of all MPs) following a request for a confidence vote by one fifth of the parliament members or by the prime minister. The prime minister and other members are jointly responsible for decisions passed by their government and individually responsible for their respective portfolios (areas of responsibility). The President of the Republic appoints the prime minister, who must then secure a vote of confidence from the Croatian Parliament (majority of all MPs); the appointment is therefore counter-signed by the speaker of the parliament to signify this. The prime minister appoints members approved by the Croatian Parliament (again signified via a counter-signature by the speaker of the parliament). The rules of procedure and regulations enacted by the government must be published in Narodne novine—the official gazette of Croatia—to bind.

In addition, the government presents annual awards in various fields.

=== Ministries ===
Name
Ministry of Finance
Ministry of Labour, Pension System, Family and Social Policy
Ministry of Defence
Ministry of Science, Education and Youth
Ministry of Tourism and Sports
Ministry of Maritime Affairs, Transport and Infrastructure
Ministry of Agriculture, Forestry and Fisheries
Ministry of the Interior
Ministry of Economy
Ministry of Construction, Spatial Planning and State Property
Ministry of Health
Ministry of Justice, Administration and Digital Transformation
Ministry of Croatian Veterans
Ministry of Regional Development and EU Funds
Ministry of Culture and Media
Ministry of Foreign and European Affairs
Ministry of Environmental Protection and Green Transition
Ministry of Demographics and Immigration

=== Offices and agencies ===
Government offices and professional services (Note: These are supporting offices of (services for) the cabinet; each is run by a Head of the Office (Director).)
Name	Responsibilities
Office of the President of the Government	Advisory, analytical and administrative services for the President of the Government (prime minister)
Legislation Office	Furnishes opinions on the compliance of proposed legislation with the Constitution
Office for the Protocol	Organisational and technical tasks required by the Government or the President of Croatia related to preparation for official visits of Croatian government officials abroad and foreign officials in Croatia; planning and control of expenditures related to these visits and other related tasks
Internal Audit Office	Internal audit services for Government bodies and offices (and other entities financed through the budget)
Directorate for the Use of Official Aircraft	Service organised as the operator of aircraft owned by the Republic of Croatia for occasional independent air transport for the needs of state authorities in national and international civilian air transport
Office for General Affairs of the Croatian Parliament and the Government of the Republic of Croatia	Administrative, analytical, financial and other tasks required by the Parliament or the Government
Office of the Committee for Relations with Religious Communities	Performs expert, administrative and other tasks related to relations with religious communities
Office of the Representative of the Republic of Croatia before the European Court of Human Rights	Manages activities of the Croatian representative (agent) before the ECHR
Office for NGOs	Cooperates with Non-governmental organisations (NGOs)
Office for Gender Equality	Administrative tasks promoting gender equality
Office for Human Rights and the Rights of National Minorities	Develops, implements and monitors human rights protection and promotion systems. Implements policies for national minority rights
Expert Service of the Council for National Minorities	Performs professional, analytical, administrative, general, technical and support tasks of the Council

State Administration Bodies (Note: In general, these supervise other government bodies such as the Public Sector Bodies (below); each is headed by a Director of the Office/Bureau/Directorate.)
Name	Responsibilities
Central State Office for Croats Abroad	Coordination and monitoring of the activities between the competent authorities for cooperation between the Republic of Croatia and the Croatians outside the Republic of Croatia
Central State Office for Public Procurement	Purchases for the central Government
State Inspectorate	Performs inspection tasks in various areas
State Metrology Bureau	Metrological administrative services, testing and supervision
State Geodetic Administration	Geodetic survey, cartography (mapmaking), cadastral and photogrammetric services
Croatian Firefighters Association	Firefighting services
Meteorological and Hydrological Service	Meteorological and hydrological services
State Intellectual Property Bureau	Protects intellectual property rights
Croatian Bureau of Statistics	Surveys, statistical analysis, and publication of survey data and analysis

Public Sector Bodies (Note: These are public sector organisations established for various tasks.)
Name	Responsibilities
Croatian Agency for the Environment and Nature (HAOP)	Nature conservation. Collects, integrates and processes environmental data; promotes sustainable development
Central Depository & Clearing Company	Manages the central depository of securities, clearing system and transaction settlement—coordinates scheduled executions of transactions between banks and maintains the registry of company stock ownership
Central Finance and Contracting Agency	Purchases using money from EU funded programmes: Budgeting, tendering, contracting, payments, accounting and financial reporting
Central Registry of Insured Persons (REGOS)	Tracks individuals and their funds for pensions
Croatian Health Insurance Fund	Health insurance
Croatian Institute of Public Health	Public health promotion and education, disease prevention, microbiology, environmental health, mental health care and addiction prevention
Croatian Employment Service	Employment mediation, unemployment benefits, vocational guidance and training
Croatian Standards Institute	National standards body; promotes safety, quality, and interoperability of products, services and processes
Croatian Pension Insurance Institute	Pension insurance fund
Hydrographic Institute of the Republic of Croatia	Safety of water navigation and development of the maritime economy
Croatian Mine Action Centre	Demining surveys and planning, cleared area acceptance, mined area marking, quality assurance, demining research and development, and mine victim assistance
Croatian Accreditation Agency	Accredits inspectors to keep European and international standards
Croatian Academic and Research Network (CARNet)	Manages internet services, promotes online development, and educates
Croatian Financial Services Supervisory Agency (HANFA)	Maintains financial system stability and supervises trade transactions for legality
Croatian Agency for Small Business (HAMAG)	Develops the economy of Croatia via entrepreneurship, supports small and medium enterprises, guarantees entrepreneurial loans, and educates and develops an advisory service for small businesses
Fund for the Compensation of Expropriated Property	Compensates for property seized during Communist rule
Financial Agency (FINA)	Financial administrative and technical services
State Agency for Deposit Insurance and Bank Rehabilitation	Bank deposit insurance
Human Rights Centre	Arranges for human rights-related public events, education, volunteer programmes and implementation of human rights projects
Croatian Competition Agency	Antitrust and merger control; monitors competition regarding agricultural and fisheries aid
Personal Data Protection Agency	Supervises personal data protection, reports personal data protection status recorded in the country and abroad, and maintains the central register of personal data
Agency for Transactions and Mediation in Immovable Properties	Supervises the purchase and trading of real estate in Croatia, except where legislation defines the authority of another body; subsidizes real estate development
State Audit Office	Constitution based institution that performs financial audits of the state and local governments (and other entities with majority government ownership)

=== Operations ===
Government meetings are typically public. It may close any part of its sessions (or entire sessions) to the public. The prime minister may authorise any deputy to represent the PM and otherwise take over any particular task assigned to the PM. The quorum for government sessions is a majority of government members. Most decisions are reached by a simple majority vote; a two-thirds majority vote is required for decisions about changes to the Croatian Constitution, uniting with other states or transferring any part of Croatian sovereignty to supranational organisations, changes to Croatian borders, dissolution of the parliament, or calling a referendum.

The inner or core cabinet (the prime minister and the PM's deputies) monitors and discusses the operation of the government, and may hold preliminary discussions on any matter performed by the government. The core cabinet may act as the government in emergencies when the government is unable to meet. Its decisions must be verified at the next government session to remain in force. The Government Secretary coordinates agencies, offices and other services subordinated to the government.

== Current cabinet ==
Portfolio	Minister	Took office	Party
Prime Minister's Office
Prime Minister	Andrej Plenković	17 May 2024	HDZ
Deputy Prime Ministers
Agriculture, Forestry and Fisheries	David Vlajčić	11 February 2025	DP
Construction, Spatial Planning and State Property	Branko Bačić	17 May 2024	HDZ
Croatian Veterans	Tomo Medved	17 May 2024	HDZ
Defence	Ivan Anušić	17 May 2024	HDZ
Finance	Tomislav Ćorić	29 January 2026	HDZ
Interior	Davor Božinović	17 May 2024	HDZ
Maritime Affairs, Transport and Infrastructure	Oleg Butković	17 May 2024	HDZ
Ministers
Culture and Media	Nina Obuljen Koržinek	17 May 2024	HDZ
Demographics and Immigration	Ivan Šipić	17 May 2024	DP
Economy	Ante Šušnjar	17 May 2024	DP
Environmental Protection and Green Transition	Marija Vučković	17 May 2024	HDZ
Foreign and European Affairs	Gordan Grlić-Radman	17 May 2024	HDZ
Health	Irena Hrstić	6 December 2024	HDZ
Justice, Public Administration and Digital Transformation	Damir Habijan	17 May 2024	HDZ
Labour, Pension System, Family and Social Policy	Alen Ružić	20 February 2026	HDZ
Regional Development and EU funds	Nataša Mikuš Žigman	15 July 2025	HDZ
Science, Education and Youth	Radovan Fuchs	17 May 2024	HDZ
Tourism and Sports	Tonči Glavina	17 May 2024	HDZ

== History ==
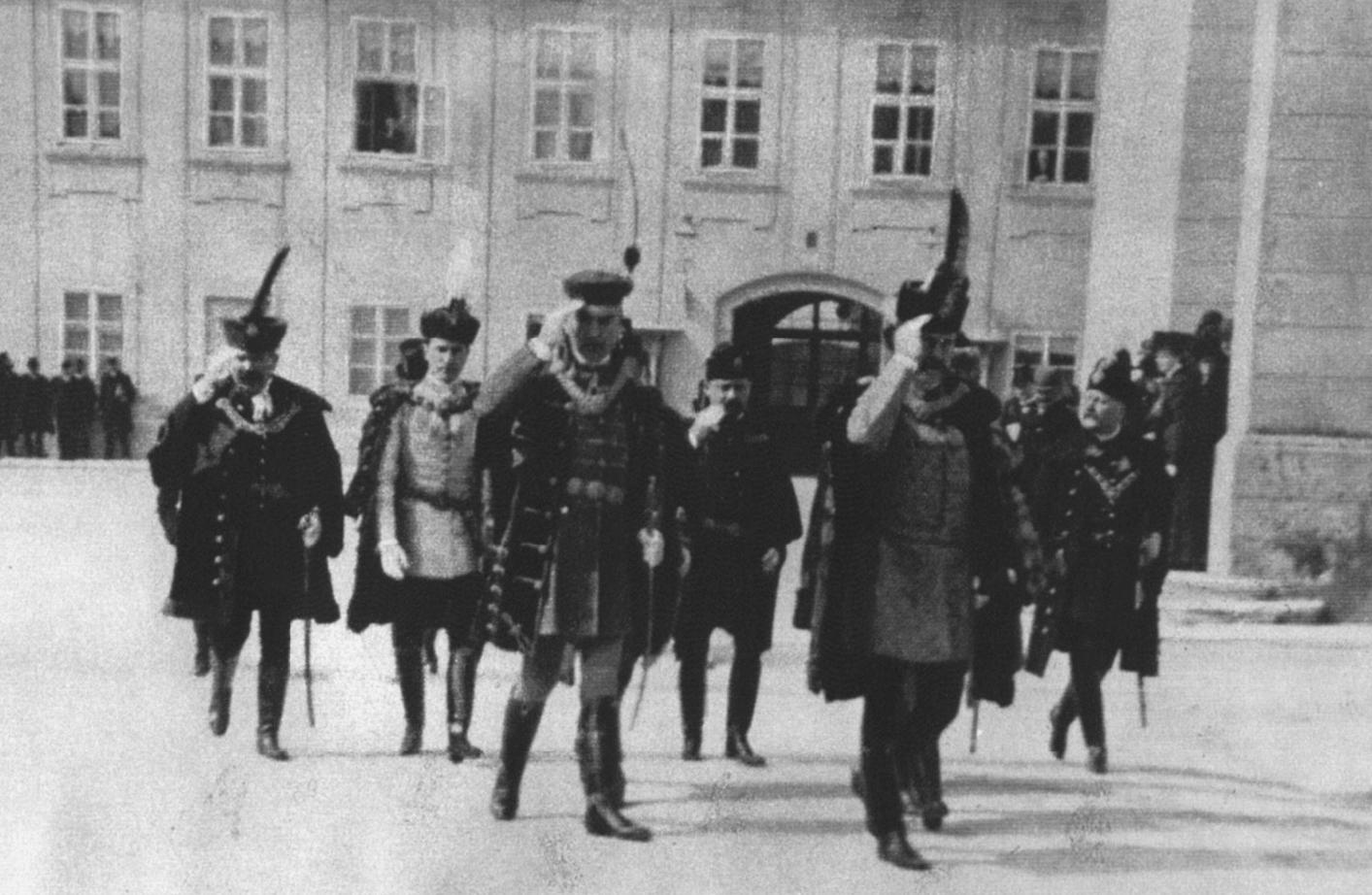
Ban Pavao Rauch at St. Mark's Square in Zagreb, with Banski dvori in the background

Short-lived Croatian Royal Council (1767–79), appointed by queen Maria Theresa, was a central authority administering economic, political and military matters in Kingdom of Croatia. Ban's Council (Croatian: Bansko vijeće) of 1848–1850 was the first executive council established in Croatia. It acted as an administrative body governing Croatia (and Slavonia) within the Austrian Empire as a government, later to be replaced by the Ban's Government (1850–1854), Royal Lieutenancy for Croatia and Slavonia (1854–1861), and Royal Lieutenancy Council (1861–1868) in Zagreb (with Royal Croatian-Slavonian-Dalmatian Chancellery in Vienna, 1862–1868).

Following the Austro-Hungarian Compromise of 1867 and the subsequent Croatian–Hungarian Settlement of 1868, the Kingdom of Croatia-Slavonia was established, along with the Government of the Land, officially the Royal Croatian-Slavonian-Dalmatian Government of the Land (Croatian: Zemaljska vlada or Kraljevska hrvatsko-slavonsko-dalmatinska zemaljska vlada) headed by a crown-appointed ban. The establishment was carried out during the administration of Ban Levin Rauch. This government form continued until the breakup of Austria-Hungary and creation of the Kingdom of Serbs, Croats and Slovenes in 1918. In total, 15 Bans acted as heads of the government in this period. The Royal Croatian-Slavonian-Dalmatian Government was not a parliamentary government, as its cabinet ministers and its head (Ban) were not appointed or confirmed by the Croatian Parliament (Sabor), but by Hungarian-Croatian government in Budapest.

In the Kingdom of Yugoslavia, the Cvetković–Maček Agreement was made in 1939; it established the Banovina of Croatia and Ivan Šubašić was appointed as ban to head the Croatian government (Ban's Government, Croatian: Banska vlast). Still, an effective government was not formed before the onset of World War II.

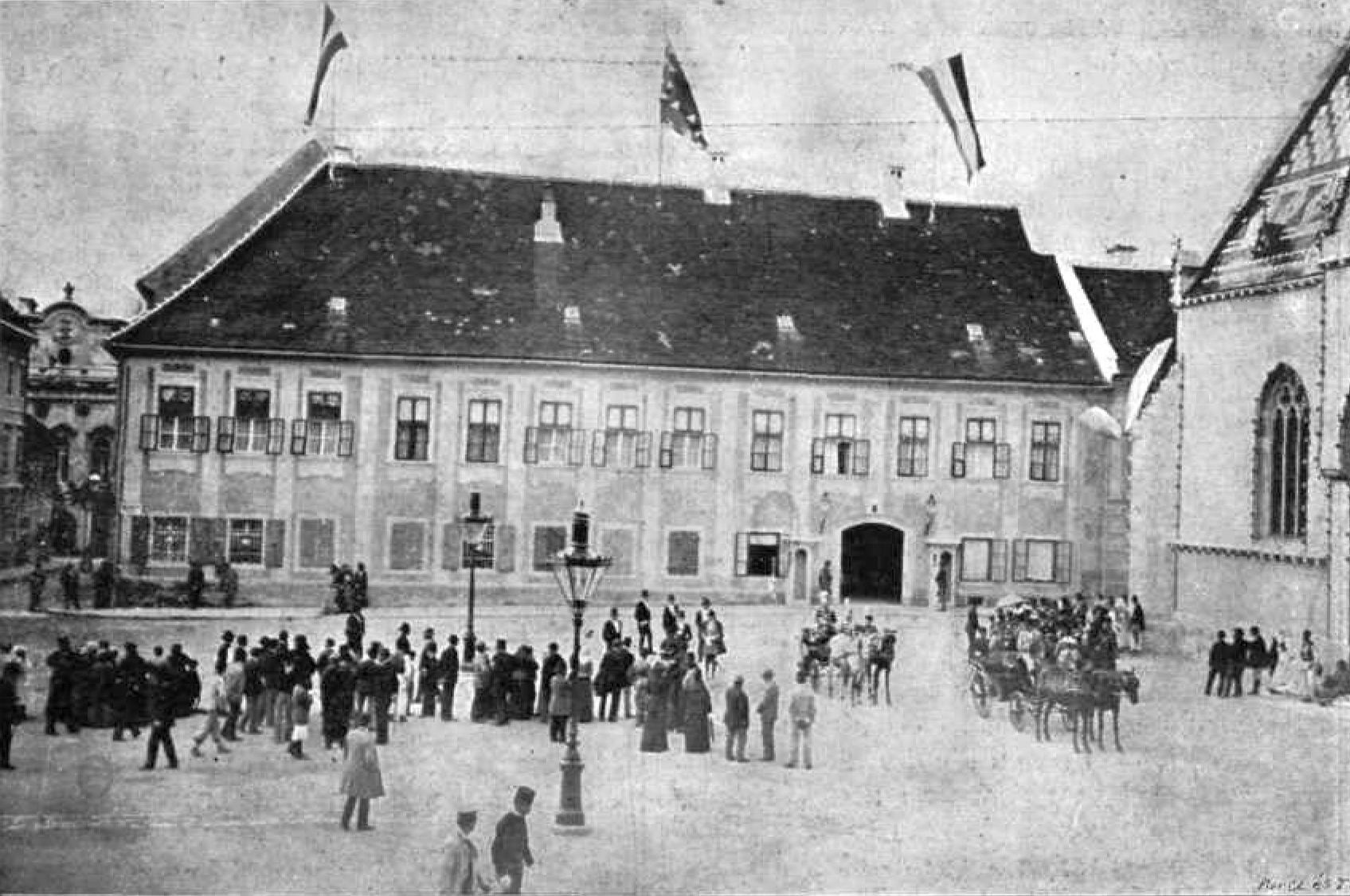
Banski dvori during the visit of Emperor Franz Joseph I in 1895.

In June 1943, the National Anti-Fascist Council of the People's Liberation of Croatia (ZAVNOH) established an 11-member executive board to act as the new government of Croatia. The first People's Government of the Federal State of Croatia (led by Vladimir Bakarić) was founded at the extraordinary session of the Presidency of the National Anti-Fascist Council of the People's Liberation of Croatia (ZAVNOH), which was held on April 14, 1945, in Split.

People's Republic of Croatia, from 1963 Socialist Republic of Croatia, a part of Yugoslavia, maintained its own government (of limited powers, excluding defence and foreign relations). The government was appointed by and responsible to the Sabor. During the Communist era, there were 14 governments of Croatia. From 1953 to 1990 the official name of the government was the Executive Council of the Sabor (Croatian: Izvršno vijeće Sabora).

Following the parliamentary elections and the adoption of the present Constitution of Croatia in 1990, the present form of government was begun. On 30 May 1990, Stjepan Mesić became the first person to hold the title of Prime Minister of Croatia, and Franjo Gregurić was the first prime minister of an independent Croatia, as he held the office on 8 October 1991 when the declaration of independence came into effect.

=== List ===
Since 30 May 1990 (the first multi-party parliamentary election held following the 45-year Communist rule), the Republic of Croatia has had a total of fourteen governments headed by twelve different prime ministers. The prime minister in the first government after the first multi-party election was Stjepan Mesić, who would later go on to become the President of Croatia. That government was formed by the Croatian Democratic Union (HDZ), as were seven other governments of Croatia. Three governments have been formed by the Social Democratic Party of Croatia (SDP), and one was a national unity government (representing a wide coalition of political parties) formed during the Croatian War of Independence's peak, between July 1991 and August 1992, with Franjo Gregurić as the prime minister.

Assumed office	Prime Minister	(Leading) Party in Office	Cabinet
30 May 1990	Stjepan Mesić	Croatian Democratic Union	Cabinet of Stjepan Mesić
24 August 1990	Josip Manolić	Croatian Democratic Union	Cabinet of Josip Manolić
17 July 1991	Franjo Gregurić	National unity government	Cabinet of Franjo Gregurić
12 August 1992	Hrvoje Šarinić	Croatian Democratic Union	Cabinet of Hrvoje Šarinić
3 April 1993	Nikica Valentić	Croatian Democratic Union	Cabinet of Nikica Valentić
7 November 1995	Zlatko Mateša	Croatian Democratic Union	Cabinet of Zlatko Mateša
27 January 2000	Ivica Račan	Social Democratic Party of Croatia	Cabinet of Ivica Račan I
30 July 2002	Ivica Račan	Social Democratic Party of Croatia	Cabinet of Ivica Račan II
23 December 2003	Ivo Sanader	Croatian Democratic Union	Cabinet of Ivo Sanader I
12 January 2008	Ivo Sanader	Croatian Democratic Union	Cabinet of Ivo Sanader II
6 July 2009	Jadranka Kosor	Croatian Democratic Union	Cabinet of Jadranka Kosor
23 December 2011	Zoran Milanović	Social Democratic Party of Croatia	Cabinet of Zoran Milanović
22 January 2016	Tihomir Orešković	Croatian Democratic Union	Cabinet of Tihomir Orešković
19 October 2016	Andrej Plenković	Croatian Democratic Union	Cabinet of Andrej Plenković I
23 July 2020	Andrej Plenković	Croatian Democratic Union	Cabinet of Andrej Plenković II
17 May 2024	Andrej Plenković	Croatian Democratic Union	Cabinet of Andrej Plenković III
Sources: Croatian Government; HIDRA.

== See also ==
- Elections in Croatia
