= State Inspectorate (Croatia) =

Government agency of Croatia

State Inspectorate Državni inspektorat
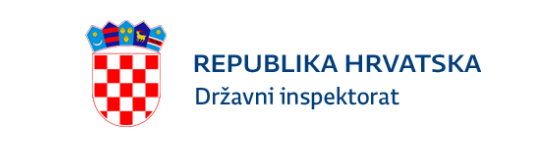

Agency overview
- Formed: 1 April 2019; 7 years ago
- Type: Government agency in the Government of Croatia
- Jurisdiction: Croatia
- Headquarters: Šubićeva 29, Zagreb, Croatia
- Employees: 1,976 (2025/2026 est.)
- Budget: €82.9 million (2026 plan)
- Website: dirh.gov.hr

Chief State Inspector
- Currently: Tonči Glavinić since 11 September 2026

State Inspectorate (Croatian: Državni inspektorat or DIRH) is the central body of the state administration of the Republic of Croatia established to carry out inspection supervision in prescribed administrative areas.

It was first established as an institutional form in December 1997, pursuant to the Act on Amendments to the Act on the Organization and Scope of Work of Ministries and State Administrative Organizations (Narodne novine 131/97). A year and a half later, in July 1999, the first Act on the State Inspectorate (NN 76/99) was passed, which regulated inspection activities, the organization and the way the body works.

== Abolition and renewal ==
The so-called Transformation of the State Inspectorate was implemented through the reform measures of the Government of the Republic of Croatia for fiscal consolidation in the period 2014–2016. With the entry into force of the Amendments Act (NN 148/13) on 1 January 2014, the State Inspectorate ceased to operate, and its previous tasks were taken over by the Ministry of Finance, the Ministry of the Economy, the Ministry of Labour and Pension System, the Ministry of Agriculture and the Ministry of Tourism.

After a multi-year hiatus, the same law, but with more recent amendments (NN 116/18), stipulates that from 1 April 2019, the State Inspectorate resumes operations as a central body of state administration. The Act on the State Inspectorate (NN 115/18), which entered into force on the same date, regulated the organization of the body, management, conditions for performing inspection tasks, duties and powers of inspectors, and misdemeanor liability.

== Legal framework and organization ==
The internal organization of the State Inspectorate, the names of internal organizational units, and their scope of work are regulated by a series of regulations. The latter was published on 22 January 2025 in the Official Gazette (NN 11/2025), and it also regulates the management of internal organizational units, work planning, working hours and the approximate number of civil servants and employees required.

The Act Amending the Act on the State Inspectorate (NN 117/21) of October 2021 prescribes the procedure for the construction inspection to issue decisions on the removal of illegally constructed buildings and implement the procedure for their enforcement through third parties. Subsequent amendments were published in the Official Gazette (NN 67/2023) and entered into force on 29 June 2023.

== Scope and competence ==
The State Inspectorate carries out inspection tasks to protect the public and public health interest in the implementation of regulations in various areas. Within the Inspectorate, the Labor Inspectorate operates as a special sector that supervises the implementation of laws and regulations governing relations between employers and workers in the field of labor relations and occupational safety.

Inspection supervision is carried out in the following areas:

- consumer protection
- food and water safety
- energy and electricity
- agricultural safety
- occupational safety
- construction safety
- environmental protection

It is possible to report to the State Inspectorate that there are indications of violations of the law by private or public organizations and institutions, for example in cases of violations of workers' rights, occupational safety, consumer protection, etc.

== List of Chief State Inspectors ==
Chief State Inspector
#	Name	Took office	Left office
1	Branko Jordanić	26 February 1998	26 March 2004
2	Kruno Kovačević	30 June 2004	16 June 2011
3	Robert Markt	16 June 2011	2 February 2012
4	Božena Vrbanić	2 February 2012	1 January 2014
Agency abolished (1 January 2014 – 31 March 2019)
5	Andrija Mikulić	1 April 2019	27 November 2025
/	Ivan Samac (acting)	27 November 2025	11 September 2026
6	Tonči Glavinić	11 September 2026	Incumbent

Note: The blue bar in the number column represents the HDZ party alignment, while the grey bar represents independent office holders.
