= Mate Granić =

Croatian diplomat and politician

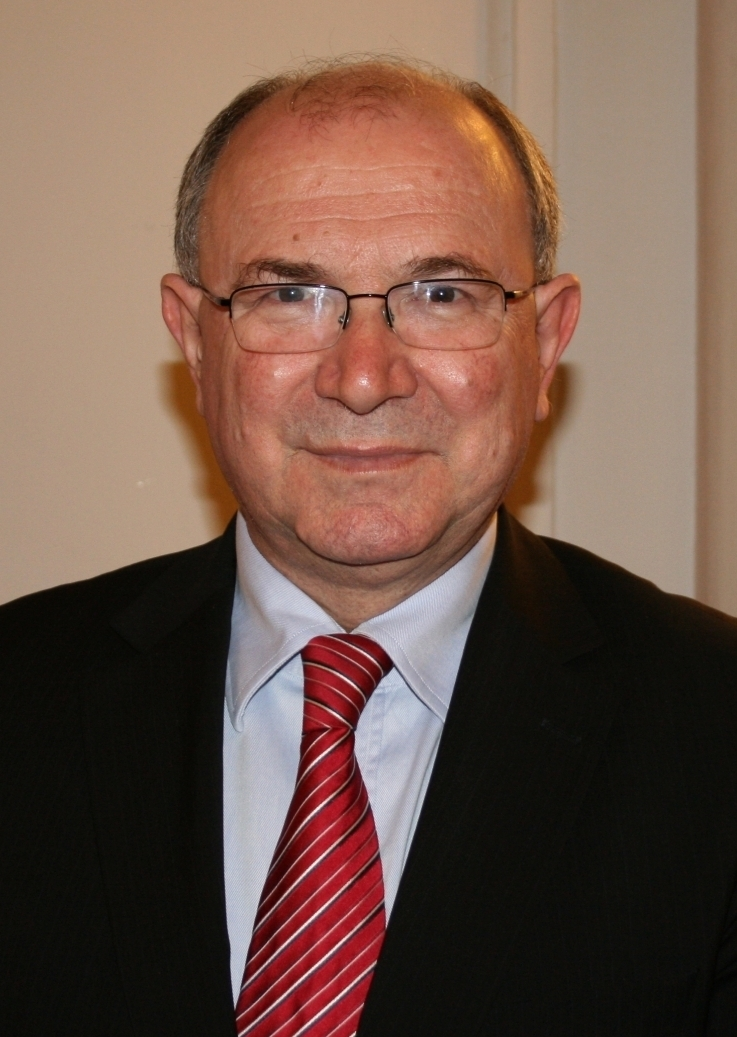

Minister of Foreign Affairs
- In office 28 May 1993 – 27 January 2000
- Prime Minister: Nikica Valentić; Zlatko Mateša
- Deputy: Ivo Sanader
- Preceded by: Zdenko Škrabalo
- Succeeded by: Tonino Picula

Deputy Prime Minister of Croatia
- In office 31 July 1991 – 27 January 2000
- Prime Minister: Franjo Gregurić; Hrvoje Šarinić; Nikica Valentić; Zlatko Mateša
- Preceded by: Franjo Gregurić
- Succeeded by: Željka Antunović

Personal details
- Born: 19 September 1947 (age 79) Baška Voda, PR Croatia, FPR Yugoslavia (modern Croatia)
- Party: Croatian Democratic Union (1989–2000, 2020–present)
- Other political affiliations: Democratic Centre (2000–2003)
- Spouse: Jadranka Granić
- Education: University of Zagreb, Vuk Vrhovac University Clinic (School of Medicine)
- Medical career
- Institutions: Vuk Vrhovac University Clinic

Mate Granić (born 19 September 1947) is a Croatian diplomat, politician and physician who served as Minister of Foreign Affairs in the Government of Croatia from 1993 to 2000.

== Biography ==
Granić was born in Baška Voda in Dalmatia (then PR Croatia, FPR Yugoslavia). He graduated from a gymnasium in Split and the medical faculty of the University of Zagreb to become a doctor by profession.

He specialized in internal medicine and was one of the founders of the internationally recognized center for diabetes, the Vuk Vrhovac University Clinic, a WHO collaborative centre.

Mate Granić served as the foreign minister of Croatia from 1993 until 2000. He was a member of the Croatian Democratic Union (HDZ) and a close associate of Franjo Tuđman. As foreign minister, in 1995 Granić helped negotiate the Dayton Agreement, a peace treaty between Croatia, Bosnia and Serbia and he visited Serbia in 1996.

Granić was considered to be a leader of the HDZ center-reformist wing. His objective as foreign minister was to defend Croatian policies concerning its occupied territories and towards Bosnia and Herzegovina, as well as protecting Croatia from UN sanctions.

His reformist views made him an opportunistic choice for the party's presidential candidate after the Tuđman's death. In January 2000, Granić entered the presidential election, but was eliminated in the first round, coming in third place with 22.5% of the vote.

When a new cabinet took office later that month, now with the HDZ without the presidency or control of the Parliament, Granić lost his post as foreign minister. Afterwards, Granić led a splinter faction of HDZ to form the Democratic Centre (Demokratski Centar) as he believed that the HDZ would be completely overtaken by tuđmanists led by Ivić Pašalić, Tuđman's former advisor.

However, not all reformists followed Granić, and in 2002 they finally won a bitter inner-party struggle with the tuđmanists. Granić's former protégé Ivo Sanader became the party's leader, and all that made the Democratic Centre politically indistinct from HDZ. As a result, the party barely survived the 2003 elections, securing only one parliamentary seat, for Vesna Škare-Ožbolt who later became the Minister of Justice in Sanader's government.

Granić left DC and seemingly retired from public life after the election. In 2004 he founded a consulting company called MAGRA Ltd. in Zagreb. In 2005, he became a special advisor to the presidency of the Croatian Party of Rights (HSP).

In the 2007 parliamentary election he headed the HSP election list in the 3rd election unit. The list failed to attain a seat in the Parliament.

In March 2020, Granić returned to the Croatian Democratic Union.

Granić is married with three children. His brother Goran Granić is a prominent Croatian politician, but unlike Mate, Goran is a liberal.

Political offices
Preceded by Zdenko Škrabalo	Minister of Foreign Affairs; 1993–2000	Succeeded by Tonino Picula
Party political offices
Preceded by Office created	President of the Democratic Centre; 2000–2003	Succeeded by Vesna Škare-Ožbolt
