= Franjo Kajfež =

Croatian chemist

Franjo Kajfež (Martijanec near Ludbreg, 15 February 1936 – Zagreb, 23 April 2004) was a Croatian chemist. Graduated (1959) and Ph.D. (1968) at the Faculty of Technology in Zagreb. Work at the Pliva factory in Zagreb (1960) was director of the Institute of Medicines in Novi Sad, Slovenia (1961–71) and director of the CRC Development Research Society in Switzerland (1971–1979). He was involved in the synthesis of organic compounds, especially chemical drugs. He was Minister of Industry, Naval Architecture and Energy (1992–1993), County of Krapina-Zagorje County (1993–1995) and Counselor of the President of the Republic for Local Self-Government and Technological Development (1995–2000). He was the owner of 88 patents and the author of 150 scientific papers.
