= Franjo Gregurić =

Croatian politician

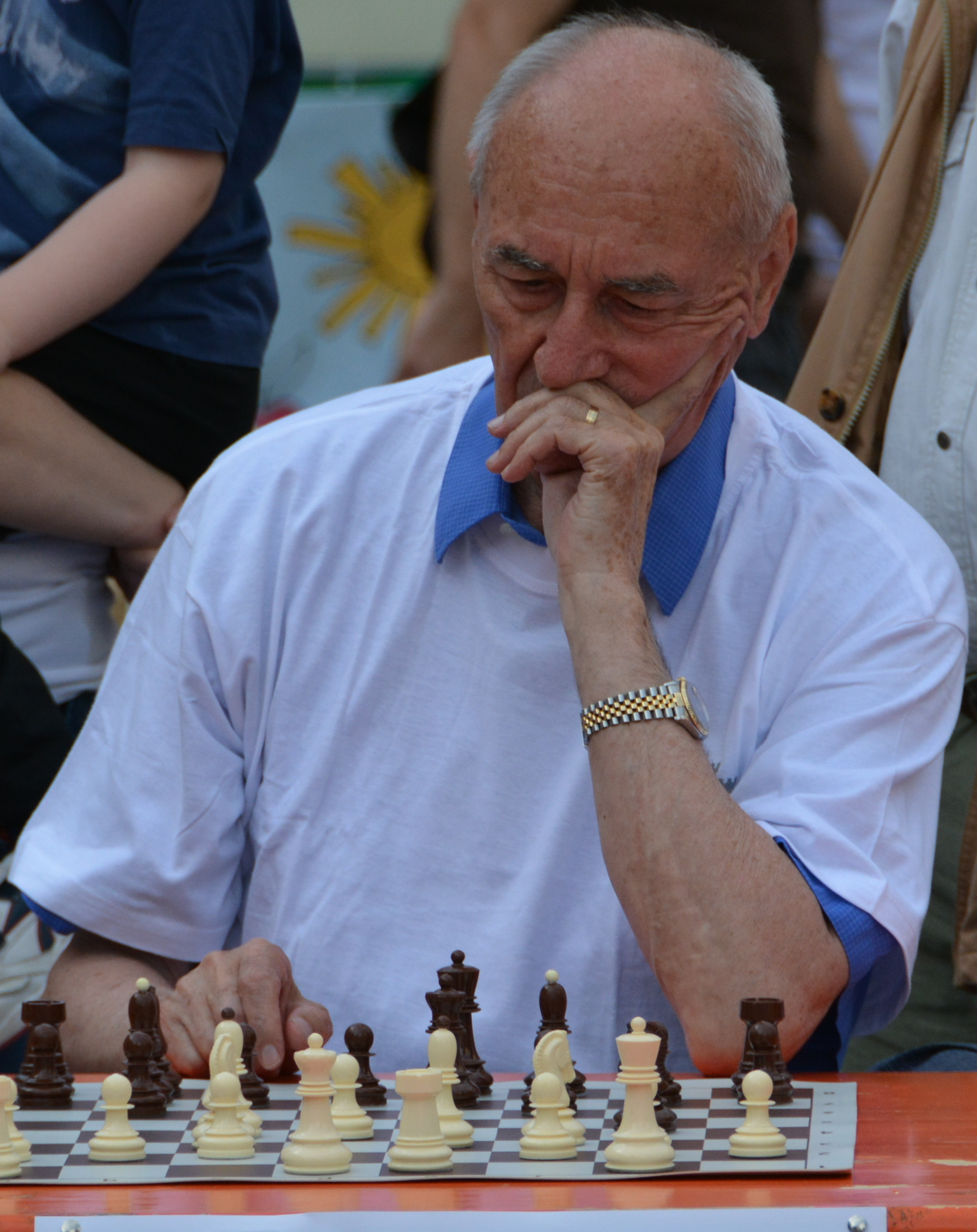
- Gregurić in 2016

Prime Minister of Croatia
- In office 17 July 1991 – 12 August 1992
- President: Franjo Tuđman
- Preceded by: Josip Manolić
- Succeeded by: Hrvoje Šarinić

Deputy Prime Minister of Croatia
- In office 8 November 1990 – 17 July 1991
- Prime Minister: Josip Manolić
- Preceded by: Mate Babić
- Succeeded by: Mate Granić

Personal details
- Born: 12 October 1939 (age 86) Lobor, Kingdom of Yugoslavia (modern Croatia)
- Party: Croatian Democratic Union
- Spouse: Jozefina Gregurić
- Children: Sanja; Boris
- Education: University of Zagreb

Franjo Gregurić (pronounced [frǎːɲo grěgurit͡ɕ]; born 12 October 1939) is a Croatian politician who served as Prime Minister of Croatia from July 1991 to September 1992, leading a national unity government at the beginning of the Croatian War of Independence.

Gregurić was born in the Zagorje village of Lobor. He attended the Technical highschool in Zagreb, and then the Technical Faculty of the University of Zagreb. His work experience included the chemical factories "Radonja" in Sisak, and "Chromos" in Zagreb, where he advanced to the positions of a technical director. He then became a high-ranking official of "Astra", a large state-owned company from Zagreb that exported to the Soviet Union, and worked in Moscow for some time.

In the first democratic elections of 1990, Franjo Gregurić entered politics as a member of the Croatian Democratic Union. In the second Croatian government in 1990 he served as a deputy prime minister. On 17 July 1991, he was appointed to the post of prime minister by President Franjo Tuđman.

When he took his post, Croatia was in a very difficult situation - its independence, declared on 25 June 1991, was not recognised by the international community and Croatia, unlike Slovenia, lacked proper military infrastructure to resist Krajina rebels backed by the Yugoslav People's Army. Only a few weeks later, following a couple of disastrous setbacks for the nascent and inexperienced Croatian military, his cabinet was reshuffled by introducing of members of other political parties represented in Croatian Parliament (with the exception of the Croatian Party of Rights).

This cabinet, later dubbed as the "Government of National Unity", was in charge when major combat operations in Croatia ceased on 3 January 1992, following a UN-sponsored armistice. On 15 January 1992, Croatian independence was recognised by major European countries.

This is hailed as the greatest achievement of Gregurić's cabinet, while Gregurić himself enjoyed favourable reputation because of his mild manners and managerial skills. His cabinet was often taken as a great example of national unity under difficult situation.

Those achievements, however, must be taken into proper context. Foreign policy was in hands of Franjo Tuđman, while defence was in hands of Gojko Šušak and military officials responsible only to the President. That left Gregurić with more mundane tasks like issuing the first Croatian currency and setting up Croatian air traffic control and other institutions previously in the Yugoslav federal jurisdiction.

With the war generally perceived to be over and with prospects of new elections, the "Government of National Unity" began to fall apart. In February 1992, Gregurić's government proposed laws offering territorial autonomy to ethnic Serbs in Krajina in exchange for their formal recognition of Croatian sovereignty. Dražen Budiša, one of the government's ministers and the leader of Croatian Social Liberal Party, left the government in protest. This was followed by representatives of other parties, who gradually left the government.

By the end of his term, the cabinet of Franjo Gregurić again had members of only one party.

At parliamentary elections of 1992, Gregurić was elected as representative of HDZ and remained in that party.

Gregurić was later the president of the Croatian Firefighting Association between 1993 and 2000.

In May 2010, Gregurić was appointed the head of the Supervisory board at Institut IGH.

== See also ==
- Cabinet of Franjo Gregurić
