= Jure Radić (engineer) =

Croatian politician and engineer

Jure Radić (15 September 1953 – 10 September 2016) was a Croatian civil engineer and politician.

Radić was born in Makarska. He graduated in 1977 and received his PhD in 1987 at the Faculty of Civil Engineering in Zagreb, where he also worked from 1977. In 1996 he was tenured. Since 1990 he is the Head of the Department for Bridges as well as the Structural Engineering Institute.

Radić was one of the founders of the Croatian Institute for Bridges. His work mostly dealt with bridge construction and concrete structures. He led several construction projects, among which are the development strategy of Croatian highways, post-war reconstruction model of Croatia, projects Maslenica Bridge and Pelješac Bridge, and others.

Since 1989, Radić was the President of the Croatian Society of Structural Engineers, and since 1995 president of the Croatian Association of Engineers. Since 2007 he was the general manager of Institut IGH. He served as the Croatian Minister of Science (1992), Head of the Office of the President of Croatia (1992–1994), Deputy Prime Minister and the Minister of Development and Reconstruction (1994–2000), as a Member of Parliament and the head of the Committee on Maritime Affairs, Transport and Communications (2000–2003). He authored nine books, numerous scientific and technical papers. He was awarded National Award for Science in 2004.

Radić died of gastric cancer on 10 September 2016. He was 63 years old.

== Works ==
- Mostovi, 2002
- Konstruiranje mostova, co-authored, 2005
