= Hrvoje Šarinić =

Croatian politician

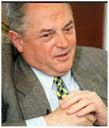

Prime Minister of Croatia
- In office 12 August 1992 – 3 April 1993
- President: Franjo Tuđman
- Preceded by: Franjo Gregurić
- Succeeded by: Nikica Valentić

Chief of Staff of the Office of the President of Croatia
- In office 5 November 1996 – 1998
- President: Franjo Tuđman
- Preceded by: Ivo Sanader
- Succeeded by: Ivica Kostović
- In office 12 October 1994 – 24 November 1995
- President: Franjo Tuđman
- Preceded by: Jure Radić
- Succeeded by: Ivo Sanader
- In office 15 April 1992 – 7 August 1992
- President: Franjo Tuđman
- Preceded by: Position established
- Succeeded by: Jure Radić

Personal details
- Born: 17 February 1935 Sušak, Kingdom of Yugoslavia (modern Croatia)
- Died: 21 July 2017 (aged 82) Zagreb, Croatia
- Resting place: Zagreb, Croatia
- Party: Croatian Democratic Union; Democratic Centre
- Spouse: Erika Šarinić
- Children: 3
- Education: University of Zagreb

Hrvoje Šarinić (pronounced [xr̩̂ʋoje ʃǎrinit͡ɕ]; 17 February 1935 – 21 July 2017) was a Croatian politician who served as Prime Minister of Croatia from 1992 to 1993.

Šarinić was born in Sušak and graduated from the University of Zagreb then-Faculty of Architecture, Construction and Geodesy.

Šarinić had a business career in Paris, France. He was a dual citizen of both Croatia and of France, as he spent 24 years in France, from 1963 to 1987. After the first democratic elections in Croatia, he joined the government of Franjo Tuđman and became head of his personal office.

After the parliamentary elections of 1992 he, as member of Croatian Democratic Union (HDZ), was appointed to the post of prime minister.

His cabinet, like all in Tuđman years, was less concerned with foreign policy and war and more with domestic issues. One of those issues was privatisation of state-owned companies. During his time many of the most controversial events of that process took place, including the now infamous takeover of Slobodna Dalmacija in early 1993.

By that time Croatian economy continued to decline, Šarinić himself became immensely unpopular and even his native Primorje-Gorski Kotar County rejected HDZ at local elections in February 1993. All that, together with escalating war in Bosnia-Herzegovina, led Tuđman to replace him with Nikica Valentić in April 1993.

Šarinić was not demoted, however. He continued to serve as Tuđman's close advisor and was, for a while, head of Croatian security services.

He remained in public spotlight because of his diplomatic missions and frequent negotiations with Slobodan Milošević. After one of those missions he created great deal of controversy by claiming that one of the results of former Yugoslav wars should be "little Greater Serbia".

In 1995, he was the government's official representative in the Erdut Agreement.

In 1998, Šarinić publicly criticized high-ranking HDZ politician Ivić Pašalić and – after Tuđman sided with Pašalić – resigned from his post. In 2000 he joined and was briefly active with the newly formed Democratic Centre.

Šarinić died on 21 July 2017 in Zagreb at the age of 82. He was buried at Mirogoj five days after his death, on 26 July.

== See also ==
- Cabinet of Hrvoje Šarinić
