= Nikica Valentić =

Croatian politician (1950–2023)

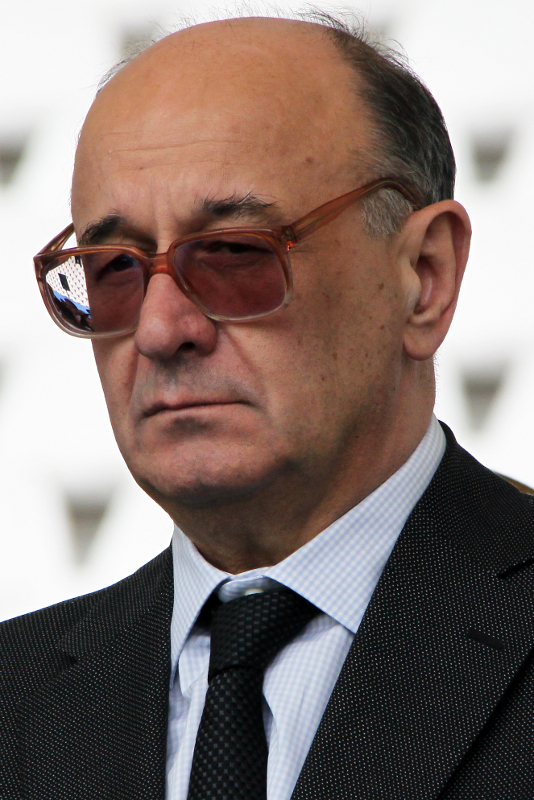
- Valentić in 2011

Prime Minister of Croatia
- In office 3 April 1993 – 7 November 1995
- President: Franjo Tuđman
- Preceded by: Hrvoje Šarinić
- Succeeded by: Zlatko Mateša

Personal details
- Born: 24 November 1950 Gospić, PR Croatia, FPR Yugoslavia (modern Croatia)
- Died: 3 May 2023 (aged 72) Zagreb, Croatia
- Party: Croatian Democratic Union
- Spouse: Antoneta Valentić
- Children: Ivan; Marija
- Education: University of Zagreb
- Occupation: Entrepreneur; lawyer; politician

Nikica Valentić (pronounced [nîkit͡sa ʋǎleːntit͡ɕ]; 24 November 1950 – 3 May 2023) was a Croatian entrepreneur, lawyer, and politician who served as Prime Minister of Croatia from 1993 to 1995. He is to date the youngest person to have served in that capacity, being 42 years old when taking office, and is also the first Croatian prime minister to have been born after World War II.

A native of Gospić, Valentić graduated from the Zagreb Faculty of Law. He was general director of INA from 1990 to 1993.

On 3 April 1993, as a member of the Croatian Democratic Union, he was appointed by the President Franjo Tuđman to the post of Prime Minister. He served in that position until 4 November 1995.

A few months after taking office his cabinet de-valued the Croatian currency, the Croatian dinar, halting inflation and bringing some sort of economic stability to Croatia for the first time after the start of the war. In June 1994 the Croatian dinar was replaced with the kuna.

In 1995, during his term in office, the Croatian military and police conducted Operation Storm which would ultimately lead to the end of the war in Croatia and neighbouring Bosnia and Herzegovina. After his term expired, he served as a member of the Croatian Parliament until 2003.

Valentić died on 3 May 2023, at the age of 72.

== See also ==
- Cabinet of Nikica Valentić
