= Elections in Croatia =

Regular elections in Croatia are mandated by the Constitution and legislation enacted by Parliament. The presidency, Parliament, county prefects and assemblies, city and town mayors, and city and municipal councils are all elective offices. Since 1990, seven presidential elections have been held. During the same period, ten parliamentary elections (with two for the upper house when the parliament was bicameral) were also held. In addition, there were nine nationwide local elections. Croatia has also held three elections to elect members of the European Parliament following its accession to the EU on 1 July 2013.

The President of Croatia is elected for a five-year term by a direct vote of all citizens in a majority system, requiring runoff elections if no candidate wins more than 50 percent of votes in the first round. Members of Parliament are elected for a four-year term in ten multi-seat constituencies, with additional members elected in special constituencies reserved for the Croatian diaspora and national minorities. As of July 2020, legislation provides for the election of 151 members of the unicameral parliament (including three representatives of the Croatian diaspora and eight representatives of national minorities). Out of 31 political parties which won seats in Croatian parliamentary elections held since 1990, only six have won ten seats or more in any one parliamentary election. Those were the Croatian Democratic Union, the Croatian Peasant Party, the Croatian People's Party – Liberal Democrats, the Croatian Social Liberal Party, Social Democratic Party of Croatia, the Homeland Movement and The Bridge. The county prefects, city/town mayors and municipality presidents are elected for four-year term by a majority of votes cast within applicable local government units, with a runoff election if no candidate achieves a majority in the first round of voting. Members of county, city/town and municipal councils are elected for a four-year term through proportional representation, with the entire local government unit as a single constituency.

Any Croatian citizen over age 18 may be a candidate in presidential, parliamentary or local government elections, provided that a sufficient number of endorsements by Croatian voters is obtained beforehand. Croatian elections are relatively well-regulated; regulations include spending limits, annual donation limits, a limitation on the number of endorsed candidates and election lists and regulations governing media coverage. Voting takes place in polling stations in Croatia and abroad, monitored by an electoral board and observers at each station. Ballots consist of an alphabetical list of candidates, or an election list with ordinal numbers (which are circled to indicate a vote). All votes are counted by hand. The State Electoral Commission publishes official results and handles complaints, supported by county, city and town electoral commissions during local elections. Decisions of the electoral commissions may be appealed at the Constitutional Court of Croatia.

== Parliamentary elections ==
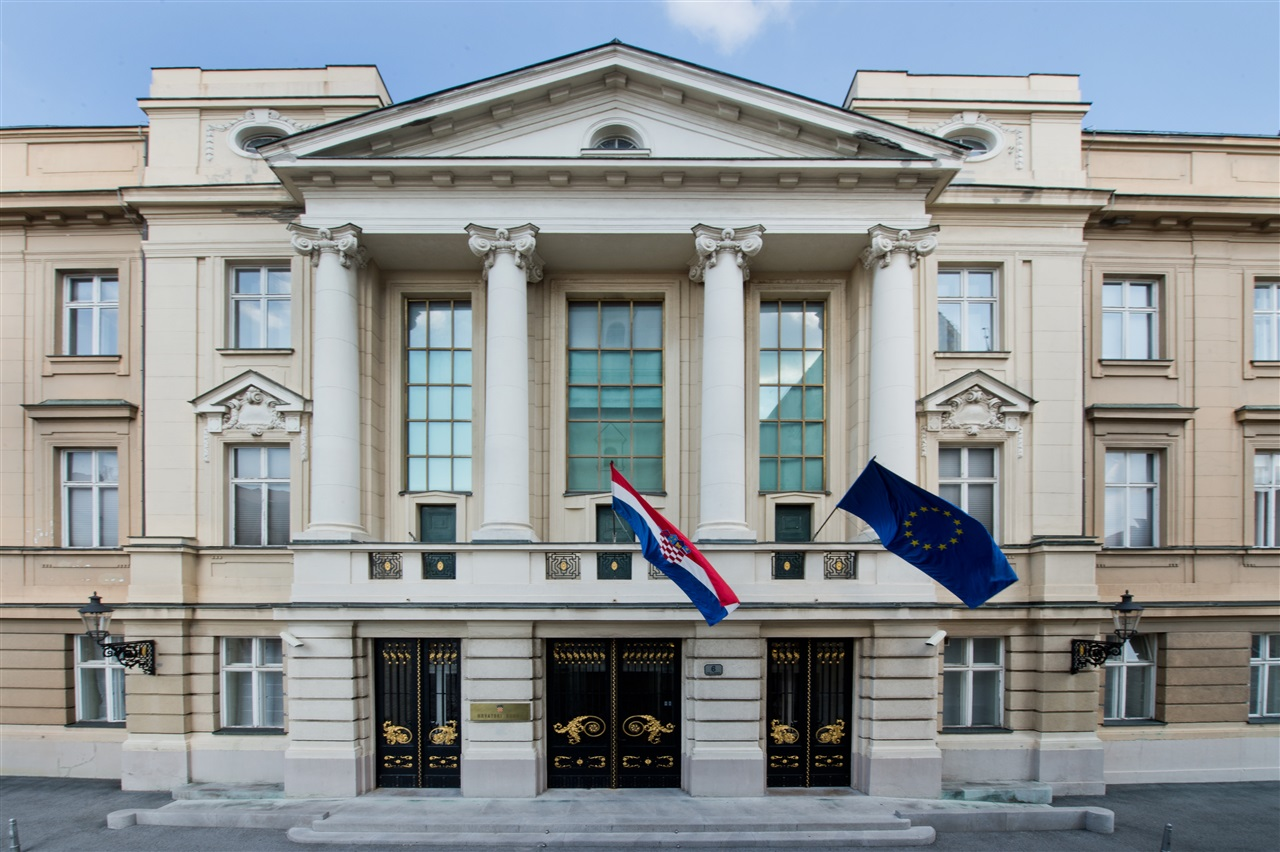
Sabor Palace

The Croatian Parliament (Croatian: Hrvatski sabor) consists of 151 members elected to four-year terms in twelve constituencies. Out of that number, 140 are elected in ten multi-seat territorial constituencies. These are defined on the basis of the existing county borders, with necessary amendments to achieve a uniform number of eligible voters in each constituency (plus or minus five percent). The eleventh constituency is for citizens of Croatia living abroad; the number of seats held by this constituency was fixed at three for the parliamentary election held in December 2011. The 2010 constitutional amendments abolished the former scheme, in which the number of MPs elected from the eleventh constituency was proportional to the ratio to the number of ballots cast in the other ten constituencies. In the 2007 general election, this method led to the eleventh constituency electing five MPs.

The standard d'Hondt formula is applied to the vote (except for the twelfth constituency in which national minority representatives are elected), with a five-percent election threshold in each constituency. Since 2015, the parliamentary elections have an element of preferential voting by letting voters choose not only for a list of candidates, but also a single member of the same list. If the percentage of votes for a candidate exceeds 10%, they are elected as if it was an open list system. The list ranking is maintained for those candidates that do not meet this quota.

Map of the Croatian electoral districts in use from 2023

An additional eight members of the parliament are elected from the twelfth constituency. It encompasses the entire country; candidates in this constituency are elected by voters belonging to 22 recognized minorities in Croatia: the Serb minority elects three MPs, the Hungarians and Italians elect one MP each, the Czech and Slovak minorities jointly elect one MP, and all other minorities elect the final two MPs. Minority MPs are elected by simple plurality system (candidates with the most votes are elected). The nationality of the voters is listed in the voter registry, which is provided by the registrar's office that maintains Croatia's vital records. Voter nationalities are normally officially declared by the parents at birth, but any citizen may declare or change that information later on at the registrar's office at least 14 days ahead of elections (not at the polling station). The voter's nationality need not be declared or may be declared as unknown. During elections, voters who have officially declared they belong to one of the recognized minorities in Croatia may choose to vote for either a territorially applicable list or a corresponding national minority list; a voter of unknown or non-declared nationality may vote for either a territorially applicable list or any minority list; a voter who has declared a nationality other than Croat or a recognized minority may vote only for a territorially applicable list (the same as someone who has declared themselves a Croat). Minority voting and minority representation rules have raised controversy and were eventually upheld by the Constitutional Court.

An election silence is enforced on the day before and the day of the elections, ending at 7:00 pm when the polling stations close and the exit polls are published.

Although political parties fund their campaigns using donations or their own assets, the government reimburses them for each parliamentary seat won. For instance, each seat won in the 2011 parliamentary election brought a party 180,000 kuna (c. 24,300 euros). Smaller sums were paid to parties or candidates failing to win any parliamentary seats, provided that they received more than five percent of the votes cast in a constituency.

=== 2024 parliamentary election ===
Party	Votes	%	Seats	+/–
Croatian Democratic Union coalition (Note: Of the 61 seat won by the coalition, the Croatian Democratic Union won 55, Croatian Social Liberal Party won two, and Croatian Demochristian Party, Croatian People's Party – Liberal Democrats, Croatian Party of Pensioners and independent Marijana Petir won one each)	729,949	34.42	61	–6
Rivers of Justice (Note: Of the 42 seats won by the coalition, the Social Democratic Party of Croatia won 37, Centre won two, and Croatian Peasant Party, Civic Liberal Alliance, Dalija Orešković and People with a First and Last Name won one each)	538,748	25.40	42	+2
Homeland Movement coalition (Note: Of the 14 seats won by the coalition, the Homeland Movement won 11 and the Law and Justice, independent Željko Lacković and independent Ivan Šipić one each)	202,714	9.56	14	+2
We can!	193,051	9.10	10	+5
The Bridge–Croatian Sovereignists (Note: Of the 11 seats won by the coalition, The Bridge won nine and the Croatian Sovereignists two)	169,988	8.02	11	–1
Focus–Republic (Note: Only seat was won by the Focus)	47,715	2.25	1	0
Our Croatia (Note: Including the IDS-PGS result in the VII district; both seats were won by Istrian Democratic Assembly)	47,655	2.25	2	–1
UZ–SU–BUZ–DSU	40,755	1.92	0	0
Determination and Justice	26,198	1.24	0	New
Independent Platform of the North	25,830	1.22	2	New
Party of Ivan Pernar	19,367	0.91	0	0
HSP–HB–HDSS	18,128	0.85	0	0
Workers' Front	16,869	0.80	0	–1
Agrarian Party–Action for Change	7,051	0.33	0	New
Autochthonous Croatian Party of Rights	6,291	0.30	0	0
Movement for a Modern Croatia	1,684	0.08	0	0
Public Good	1,650	0.08	0	New
Socialist Labour Party of Croatia	1,206	0.06	0	0
Righteous Croatia	1,124	0.05	0	New
Croatian Civil Resistance Party	998	0.05	0	0
Croatian Party of Rights — Dr. Ante Starčević	882	0.04	0	New
Međimurje Democratic Union	762	0.04	0	New
Dalmatian Action	699	0.03	0	New
Party of Croatian Unity	231	0.01	0	New
Independents	21,234	1.00	0	0
Total	2,120,779	100.00	143	0
Valid votes	2,120,779	97.27		
Invalid/blank votes	59,632	2.73		
Total votes	2,180,411	100.00		
Registered voters/turnout	3,523,270	61.89		
Minority lists
Independent Democratic Serb Party			3	0
Bošnjaci zajedno!			1	New
Croatian Romani Union "Kali Sara"			1	0
Democratic Union of Hungarians			1	0
Independents			2	0
Total			8	0
Valid votes	33,914	97.56		
Invalid/blank votes	849	2.44		
Total votes	34,763	100.00		
Source: Results

=== Next parliamentary election ===
See article: Next Croatian parliamentary election

Parliamentary elections are to be held no later than 60 days after the expiration of the 4-year parliamentary term, counting from the day that parliament is constituted with the election of a Speaker or no later than 60 days after the dissolution of parliament by vote of MPs. The 11th Assembly of Parliament was constituted on 16 May 2024.

=== Previous parliamentary elections ===
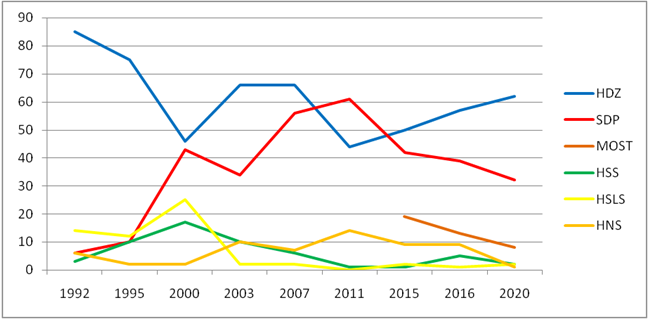
Croatian parliamentary election results, 1992–2020; parties winning 10 or more seats in any one election shown individually

Since 1990, fourteen parliamentary elections have been held in Croatia. These have included the 1990 elections for a tricameral parliament, three elections of the Chamber of Deputies during the bicameral parliament's existence, seven elections of the unicameral Parliament and two elections of the Chamber of Counties—the upper house of the bicameral parliament.

The elections held in 1990 were the first multi-party elections after 45 years of Communist rule; candidates vied for all 80 seats in the Social-Political Council of Croatia, all 116 seats in the Municipalities Council of Croatia and all 160 seats in the Associated Labour Council of Croatia (since Parliament had three chambers at the time). The first round of the election saw a turnout of 85.5 percent, and the runoff-election turnout was 74.8 percent. The Croatian Democratic Union (HDZ) won 205 seats, and the League of Communist of Croatia won 107.

==== Previous Chamber of Deputies and unicameral Sabor elections ====
Nine parliamentary elections have been held since for the Chamber of Deputies (Croatian: Zastupnički dom) or the unicameral parliament since then—in 1992, 1995, 2000, 2003, 2007, 2011, 2015, 2016, 2020. Beginning with the 1992 elections, the number of seats in the Chamber of Deputies (and, later, in the unicameral parliament) was significantly changed—ranging from 127 in 1995 to 153 in 2007 and 151 in 2011. In the Croatian parliamentary elections held since 1992, when the number of seats in parliament was limited below 160, only six parties have won ten seats or more in any single election: the Croatian Democratic Union (HDZ), the Croatian Peasant Party (HSS), the Croatian People's Party – Liberal Democrats (HNS), the Croatian Social Liberal Party (HSLS) and the Social Democratic Party of Croatia (SDP), The Bridge(Most).

Several other political parties (besides the HDZ, HSS, HNS, HSLS, Most and SDP) have won parliamentary seats since the 1990 election. Those are (in alphabetical order): the Alliance of Primorje-Gorski Kotar (previously known as the Rijeka Democratic Alliance), the Croatian Christian Democratic Union, the Croatian Citizen Party, the Croatian Democratic Alliance of Slavonia and Baranja, the Croatian Democratic Peasant Party, the Croatian Independent Democrats, the Croatian Party of Pensioners, the Croatian Party of Rights, the Croatian Party of Rights dr. Ante Starčević, Dalmatian Action, the Democratic Centre, the Istrian Democratic Assembly, the Liberal Party, the Party of Liberal Democrats, the Serb Democratic Party, the Slavonia-Baranja Croatian Party and the Social Democratic Action of Croatia. The following parties have won the special seats reserved for national minority representatives (also in alphabetical order): the Bosnian Democratic Party of Croatia, the Democratic Union of Hungarians of Croatia, the German People's Union – National Association of Danube Swabians in Croatia, the Independent Democratic Serb Party, the Party of Democratic Action of Croatia and the Serb People's Party. In addition, numerous independents have won seats through party lists, and Ivan Grubišić's nonpartisan list won seats as a territorial election list. Since the parliamentary seats won belong to individuals, not parties, there have been instances where members have become independent or switched to another political party.

Parliamentary elections overview since 1990 (Tricameral parliament (1990), Chamber of Representatives (Lower house 1990–2001), unicameral parliament (2001–present))
Election	Turnout	Results	Cabinet(s)
1990	*	1st assembly	Cabinet of Stjepan Mesić, Cabinet of Josip Manolić, Cabinet of Franjo Gregurić
1992	75.6%	2nd assembly	Cabinet of Hrvoje Šarinić, Cabinet of Nikica Valentić
1995	68.8%	3rd assembly	Cabinet of Zlatko Mateša
2000	70.5%	4th assembly	Cabinet of Ivica Račan I, Cabinet of Ivica Račan II
2003	61.7%	5th assembly	Cabinet of Ivo Sanader I
2007	59.5%	6th assembly	Cabinet of Ivo Sanader II, Cabinet of Jadranka Kosor
2011	54.3%	7th assembly	Cabinet of Zoran Milanović
2015	60.8%	8th assembly	Cabinet of Tihomir Orešković
2016	52.6%	9th assembly	Cabinet of Andrej Plenković I
2020	46.4%	10th assembly	Cabinet of Andrej Plenković II
2024	62.3%	11th assembly	Cabinet of Andrej Plenković III
Source: State Election Commission

*In the first multi-party elections in 1990 three parliamentary chambers were elected in a two-round majoritarian system: the Social-Political Council, the Council of Municipalities and the Council of Associated Labour. Turnout for the election each chamber varied. It was as follows: Social-Political council (84.5% in first round in all constituencies, 74.82% in second round in 51 of 80 constituencies), Council of Municipalities (84.1% in first round, 74.6% in second round) and Council of Associated Labour (76.5% in first round in all constituencies, 66% in second round in 103 of 160 constituencies).

Seats won in parliamentary elections (since 1990, Chamber of Deputies or unicameral parliament)
Party	1990	1992	1995	2000	2003	2007	2011	2015	2016	2020
Alliance of Primorje-Gorski Kotar	–	1	1	2	1	–	–	–	–	–
Bloc for Croatia	–	–	–	–	–	–	–	–	–	1
Bloc of Pensioners - Together	–	–	–	–	–	–	–	1	–	–
Bosniak Democratic Party of Croatia	–	–	–	–	–	–	1	–	–	–
Bridge of Independent Lists	–	–	–	–	–	–	–	19	13	8
Civic Liberal Alliance	–	–	–	–	–	–	–	–	–	1
Coalition of People's Accord	3	–	–	–	–	–	–	–	–	–
Croatian Christian Democratic Union	–	–	1	1	–	–	–	1	–	–
Croatian Citizen Party	–	–	–	–	–	–	2	–	–	–
Croatian Democratic Alliance of Slavonia and Baranja	–	–	–	-	–	3	6	2	1	–
Croatian Democratic Peasant Party	–	–	–	–	1	–	–	–	–	–
Croatian Democratic Union	55	85	75	46	66	66	44	50	57	62
Croatian Growth	–	–	–	–	–	–	–	1	1	–
Croatian Labourists – Labour Party	–	–	–	–	–	–	6	3	–	–
Croatian Party of Pensioners	–	–	–	–	3	1	3	2	1	1
Croatian Party of Rights	–	5	4	4	8	1	–	–	–	–
Croatian Party of Rights dr. Ante Starčević	–	–	–	–	–	–	1	3	–	–
Croatian Peasant Party	–	3	10	17	10	6	1	1	5	2
Croatian People's Party – Liberal Democrats	–	6	2	2	10	7	14	9	9	1
Croatian Social Liberal Party	–	14	12	25	2	2	–	2	1	2
Croatian Sovereignists	–	–	–	–	–	–	–	–	–	4
Dalmatian Action	–	1	–	–	–	–	–	–	–	–
Democratic Centre	–	–	–	–	1	–	1	–	–	–
Democratic Union of Hungarians of Croatia	–	–	–	–	1	–	–	–	1	1
Focus	–	–	–	–	–	–	–	–	–	1
German People's Union	–	–	–	–	1	–	–	–	–	–
Human Blockade	–	–	–	–	–	–	–	1	4	–
Independent Democratic Serb Party	–	–	–	–	3	3	3	3	3	3
Istrian Democratic Assembly	–	4	3	4	4	3	3	3	3	3
Liberal Party	–	–	–	2	2	–	–	–	–	–
Milan Bandić 365 - The Party of Labour and Solidarity	–	–	–	–	–	–	–	2	1	–
Miroslav Škoro Homeland Movement	–	–	–	–	–	–	–	–	–	9
New Left	–	–	–	–	–	–	–	–	–	1
Party of Democratic Action of Croatia	–	–	1	–	1	1	–	–	–	–
People's Party - Reformists	–	–	–	–	–	–	–	1	1	1
Party of Liberal Democrats	–	–	–	–	3	–	–	–	–	–
Party with a First and Last Name	–	–	–	–	–	–	–	–	–	1
Serb Democratic Party	1	–	–	–	–	–	–	–	–	–
Serb People's Party	–	3	2	1	–	–	–	–	–	–
Slavonia-Baranja Croatian Party	–	–	1	1	–	–	–	–	–	–
Smart	–	–	–	–	–	–	–	–	–	1
Social Democratic Action of Croatia	–	–	1	–	–	–	–	–	–	–
Social Democratic Party of Croatia	20	6	10	43	34	56	61	42	39	32
We can!	–	–	–	–	–	–	–	–	–	4
Independent	1	4	3	3	4	4	5	5	5	5
Source: State Election Commission

==== Chamber of Counties elections ====
Under the Constitution of Croatia adopted in 1990, the Parliament of Croatia became bicameral. The Chamber of Deputies had been elected a few months earlier, and its members enacted legislation creating a new territorial organisation of Croatia. This included 21 counties that were to be represented by the new Chamber of Counties (Croatian: Županijski dom). The first election of members to the chamber was held on 7 February 1993, with each county acting as a multi-seat constituency; three MPs were elected in each county on the basis of proportional representation. In addition, the President of Croatia appointed up to 5 more members of the Chamber of the Counties to complete its 68-strong membership. The second election for the Chamber of Counties was held on 13 April 1997. The Chamber of Deputies was abolished by a constitutional amendment in 2001.

Seats won in parliamentary elections by individual parties Chamber of Counties elections 1993–1997
Party	1993	1997
Croatian Democratic Union	39	42
Croatian Party of Rights	–	2
Croatian Peasant Party	5	9
Croatian People's Party	1	–
Croatian Social Liberal Party	16	7
Istrian Democratic Assembly	3	2
Social Democratic Party of Croatia	1	4
Independent	3	2
Source: State Election Commission

== Presidential elections ==
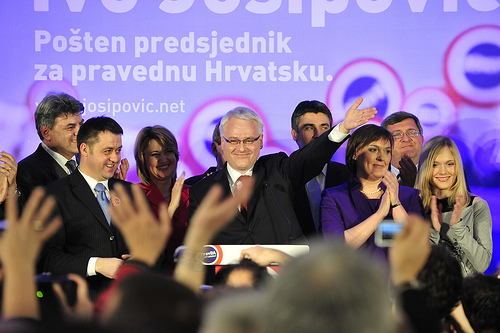
Ivo Josipović's 2010 election victory speech

The President of Croatia (officially the President of the Republic, Croatian: Predsjednik Republike) is elected to a five-year term by a direct vote of all citizens, with a majority vote required to win. A runoff election is held if no candidate secures a majority in the first round. The presidential elections are regulated by the constitution and dedicated legislation; however, the latter only defines technical details, appeals and similar issues. Any citizen of Croatia, 18 or older, may be a candidate in a presidential election if the candidate is endorsed by 10,000 voters. The endorsements are required in the form of a list containing name, address, personal identification number and voter signature. The presidential elections are regulated by an act of parliament. Election silence is in force on the day of the elections and the previous day, ending at 7 in the evening as polling stations close; exit polls may be published after that time. Unless the presidential term is cut short by death, resignation or removal from office, resulting in an early election, the elections for President of the Republic are scheduled to take place every 5 years, with the incumbent having a possibility of re-election. The president is currently term limited to two 5-year terms.

=== 2024–25 presidential election ===
Candidate	Party	First round		Second round	
Candidate	Party	Votes	%	Votes	%
Zoran Milanović	Independent (Social Democratic Party) (Note: Endorsed by the SDP, HSS, NS-R, NPS, SU, BUZ, Centre, IDS, DO i SIP, Glas and MDS)	797,938	49.68	1,122,859	74.68
Dragan Primorac	Independent (Croatian Democratic Union) (Note: Endorsed by the HDZ, HSU, HDS, DP, HSLS and HNS)	314,663	19.59	380,752	25.32
Marija Selak Raspudić	Independent	150,435	9.37		
Ivana Kekin	We Can!	144,533	9.00		
Tomislav Jonjić	Independent (Croatian Party of Rights)	82,787	5.15		
Miro Bulj	The Bridge	62,127	3.87		
Branka Lozo	Home and National Rally	39,321	2.45		
Niko Tokić Kartelo	Independent	14,409	0.90		
Total		1,606,213	100.00	1,503,611	100.00
Valid votes		1,606,213	98.84	1,503,611	96.33
Invalid/blank votes		18,786	1.16	57,209	3.67
Total votes		1,624,999	100.00	1,560,820	100.00
Registered voters/turnout		3,531,622	46.01	3,533,441	44.17
Source: izbori.hr, izbori.hr

=== Next presidential election ===
The next presidential election in Croatia is due to be held no more than 60 and no less than 30 days before the expiry of the incumbent president's term, as stated in the Constitution of Croatia. If the current president serves out his full term, which began on 19 February 2020 and lasts for 5 years, the election must be held on a date between 21 December 2024 and 20 January 2025.

After his victory in the 2024-25 election, 5th president Zoran Milanović became the 3rd president to be elected to a 2nd term in office. The only candidates eligible to run for a second presidential term are former presidents Ivo Josipović and Kolinda Grabar Kitarović. Both narrowly lost re-election in their respective campaign, with Josipović losing to Grabar Kitarović in 2015, and Grabar Kitarović losing to Zoran Milanović in 2020. Both are therefore eligible for a second term.

=== Previous presidential elections ===
Presidential elections were held in Croatia for the first time on 2 August 1992, concurrently with the 1992 parliamentary elections. Voter turnout was 74.9 percent. The result was a victory for Franjo Tuđman of the HDZ, who received 57.8 percent of the vote in the first round of the election (ahead of seven other candidates). Dražen Budiša, the HSLS candidate and runner-up in the election, received 22.3 percent of the vote. The second presidential election in modern Croatia was held on 15 June 1997. The incumbent, Franjo Tuđman, ran opposed by Zdravko Tomac (candidate of the SDP) and Vlado Gotovac (nominated by the HSLS). Tomac and Gotovac received 21.0 and 17.6 percent of votes, respectively, in the first round of voting and Tuđman secured another term. The third presidential elections were held on 24 January 2000 to fill the office of President, after incumbent Franjo Tuđman died on 10 December 1999. The first round of voting saw Stjepan Mesić (candidate of the Croatian People's Party, or HNS) in front with 41.3 percent of the vote, followed by Dražen Budiša of the HSLS with 27.8 percent and Mate Granić (nominated by the HDZ) receiving 22.6 percent. The runoff election (the first in a modern Croatian presidential election) was held on 7 February; Mesić won, picking up 56.9 percent of the vote. Voter turnout was 63.0 percent in the first round, and 60.9 percent in the runoff. The first round of the fourth presidential election was held on 2 January 2005. No candidate secured a first-round victory; however, incumbent Mesić enjoyed a substantial lead over the other candidates. Mesić received 48.9 percent of the vote; the second- and third-ranked candidates (Jadranka Kosor of the HDZ and Boris Mikšić, an independent) managed only 20.3 and 17.8 percent, respectively, of voter support. Ultimately, Mesić won reelection by receiving 65.9 percent of votes in the runoff held on 16 January. The fifth presidential election was held on 27 December 2009 with Ivo Josipović (SDP) picking up 32.4 percent of the vote, followed by Milan Bandić (independent), Andrija Hebrang (HDZ) and Nadan Vidošević (independent) receiving 14.8, 12.0 and 11.3 percent of the vote respectively. The second round of voting was held on 10 January 2010, when Josipović defeated Bandić with 60.3 percent of the vote. The sixth presidential election was held on 28 December 2014 and saw only four candidates of which none have won majority. In the first round incumbent Ivo Josipović won most of votes in front of second Kolinda Grabar-Kitarović (HDZ) and third Ivan Vilibor Sinčić (ŽZ). The second round was held on 11 January 2015 with Grabar Kitarović closely wins in front of Josipović who become first Croatian president who was not re-elected. The most recent Croatian presidential election was held on 22 December 2019 and 5 January 2020. First round saw 11 candidates running for presidency, three of which has won more than 20% of votes each, what makes it the closest run among top three Zoran Milanović (29.55), Kolinda Grabar Kitarović (26.55) and Miroslav Škoro (24.45). In the second round a battle between incumbent Kolinda Grabar Kitarović and ex-prime minister Zoran Milanović(SDP) was held as Milanović won by the margin of more than 5 p.p.

Election	Candidates	First round voter turnout	First round results (candidates with more than 10% of votes)	Second round voter turnout	Winner
1992	8	74.90%	Franjo Tuđman (57.8%), Dražen Budiša (22.3%)	—N/a	Franjo Tuđman
1997	3	54.62%	Franjo Tuđman (61.4%), Zdravko Tomac (21.0%), Vlado Gotovac (17.6%)	—N/a	Franjo Tuđman
2000	9	62.98%	Stjepan Mesić (41.3%), Dražen Budiša (27.8%), Mate Granić (22.6%)	60.88%	Stjepan Mesić
2005	13	50.57%	Stjepan Mesić (48.9%), Jadranka Kosor (20.3%), Boris Mikšić (17.8%)	51.04%	Stjepan Mesić
2009–10	12	43.96%	Ivo Josipović (32.4%), Milan Bandić (14.8%), Andrija Hebrang (12.04%), Nadan Vidošević (11.33%)	50.13%	Ivo Josipović
2014–15	4	47.12%	Ivo Josipović (38.46%), Kolinda Grabar-Kitarović (37.22%), Ivan Vilibor Sinčić (16.42%)	59.06%	Kolinda Grabar-Kitarović
2019–20	11	51.18%	Zoran Milanović (29.55%), Kolinda Grabar-Kitarović (26.65%), Miroslav Škoro (24.45%)	54.99%	Zoran Milanović
2024–25	8	46.01%	Zoran Milanović (49.68%), Dragan Primorac (19.59%)	44.17%	Zoran Milanović
Source: State Election Commission

== Local elections ==
Elections in Croatia
- Result of the elections, showing elected county prefects HDZ SDP We Can! NPS Independent

Croatia's county prefects, city and town mayors are elected to four-year terms by a majority of votes cast within applicable local government units, with a runoff election if no candidate achieves a majority in the first round of voting. Members of county, city and municipal councils are elected to four-year terms through proportional representation, with the entire local government unit as a single constituency. The number of council members is defined by the councils themselves, based on applicable legislation. Electoral committees are tasked with determining whether the national minorities are represented in the council (as required by the constitution), adding further members to the council (who belong to the appropriate minorities) by selecting them from unelected-candidate lists. Election silence, as in all other elections in Croatia, is enforced on the day of the elections and the previous day, ending at 7:00 pm when the polling stations close and exit polls may be announced.

Number of seats in each county, city or municipality is defined by the Law on Local and Regional Self-Government and depends on their population.

Population of the county	Seats
with more than 300,000 inhabitants	47
between 200,000 and 300,000 inhabitants	41
between 100,000 and 200,000 inhabitants	37
between 60,000 and 100,000 inhabitants	31
up to 60,000 inhabitants	27

Population of the cities and municipalities	Seats
with more than 300,000 inhabitants	47
between 200,000 and 300,000 inhabitants	41
between 100,000 and 200,000 inhabitants	31
between 60,000 and 100,000 inhabitants	27
between 35,000 and 60,000 inhabitants	21
between 20,000 and 35,000 inhabitants	19
between 10,000 and 20,000 inhabitants	15
between 2,500 and 10,000 inhabitants	13
between 1,000 and 2,500 inhabitants	9
up to 1,000 inhabitants	7

Results of the election, showing elected municipal and city mayors

Of the nine nationwide local elections held in Croatia since 1990, the most recent were the 2021 local elections to elect county prefects and councils, city and town councils and mayors. In these elections, HDZ-led coalitions won a 13 county-prefects, SDP-led coalitions won two county-prefects while the one was taken by Možemo, IDS and Mreža each and three were independent. In elections for city mayors 56 were won by HDZ candidates, 29 was independent and 22 was from SDP, while rest of 21 mayors are won by some of other 13 parties.

=== National Minorities Councils and Representatives Elections ===
National Minorities Councils are bodies that enable national minorities participation in public life and management of local affairs. Elections for councils and representatives are regulated by the Constitutional Act on the Rights of National Minorities in the Republic of Croatia and the Law on Election of Councils and Representatives of National Minorities. National minorities are electing municipal and county councils or representatives depending on relative and absolute minority population. Councils are elected in municipalities and cities in which minority population constitute at least 1,5% of the total population and there is at least 200 members of certain minority group. County councils are elected if there is more than 500 members of certain minority in a given Croatian county. Units with smaller numbers of members of certain minority, but in which there is still 100 or more members of given minority are electing minority representatives. 10 members are elected into municipal minority councils, 15 into city councils and 25 into county councils.

Minority elections are called by decision of the Government of the Republic of Croatia. The State Election Commission is proposing to the government the fees for the work of the members of the electoral bodies. Bodies responsible for the implementation of the elections are the State Election Commission, county election commissions, the Election Commission of the City of Zagreb, town and municipal election commissions and polling boards.

== European Parliament elections ==
Croatia first elected 12 members of the European Parliament (MEPs) in a by-election held after its accession to the EU in 2013. Thereafter, its number of members in the European Parliament was reduced to 11 and the country elected them as part of the regular election in 2014. Reallocation of seats followed Brexit so Croatia have returned to 12 seates in 2019 elections. The elections are regulated by special legislation enacted by the Sabor. Provisions of the legislation are very similar to the parliamentary-election legislation, with the main difference being that the 12 members of the European Parliament are elected in a single constituency encompassing all of Croatia, instead of multiple constituencies used in the parliamentary elections.

The HDZ has won every EU election since 2013, As of 2024.

Seats won in elections for Members of the European Parliament for Croatia by individual parties European Parliament elections in Croatia (since 2013)
Party (European Parliament group)	2013	2014	2019
Croatian Conservative Party (ECR)	-	-	1
Croatian Democratic Union (EPP)	5	4	4
Croatian Labourists - Labour Party (EUL-NGL)	1	0	0
Croatian Party of Rights dr. Ante Starčević (ECR)	1	1	0
Croatian Peasant Party (EPP)	0	1	0
Croatian People's Party – Liberal Democrats (ALDE)	0	1	0
Croatian Sustainable Development (Greens/EFA)	-	1	0
Human Blockade (NI)	0	0	1
Istrian Democratic Assembly (ALDE)	0	1	1
Social Democratic Party of Croatia (S&D)	5	2	4
Independent	-	-	1
Total seats	12	11	12
Source: State Election Commission

== Referendums ==
A referendum in Croatia can be called by the Parliament or the President on any issue falling within the purview of parliament, or on any other issue the president considers important to the independence, unity and existence of the republic. Since the constitution was amended in 2001, parliament is obligated by the constitution to call for a referendum if signatures of 10 percent of registered Croatian voters are collected. The signatures, by law, must be collected within a 15-day period. Referendums are regulated by Article 87 of the constitution of Croatia which requires that the parliament passes an act on each referendum and that the outcome is binding unless the referendum is called as an advisory referendum.

There have been three referendums in modern Croatia: Croatian independence referendum, Croatian European Union membership referendum and Marriage definition referendum, and in all three majority voted in favor. There have been four other public initiatives to collect the support of 10 percent of voters for a referendum, none of which were successful: concerning Croatian cooperation with the International Criminal Tribunal for the former Yugoslavia, concerning accession of Croatia to NATO in 2008, concerning Arbitration Agreement on Croatian-Slovenian border issues in 2009, and concerning Labour Act in 2010.

== Political campaigns ==
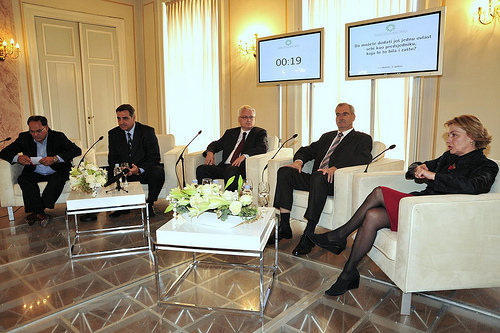
2009–2010 presidential election debate

Any Croatian citizen aged 18 or over may become a candidate in presidential, parliamentary or local elections. In order to become an official candidate, 10,000 signatures from Croatian citizens aged 18 or over must be collected and submitted to the State Electoral Commission. This must be done within 12 days following the publication of the decision to hold elections in Narodne Novine, the official gazette of the Republic of Croatia. The endorsements are made in a list comprising name, address and personal identification number (PIN) of each of the citizens supporting a particular candidate. Each citizen may only endorse a single candidate. The election commission verifies the endorsement lists, publishes the candidate list in all daily newspapers in Croatia (and on Croatian Radiotelevision) and delivers it to the Croatian diplomatic missions for publication.

In parliamentary elections, 14-member election lists may be submitted to the State Electoral Commission for any number of constituencies in Croatia. A 14-member list of candidates may also be submitted for the Croatian diaspora constituency, while a two-member list can be submitted for the ethnic-minority representatives. In each case, 500 endorsements are required for an election list to become valid. The lists may be supported by one or more political parties, or by a group of voters as an independent list. No one may be a candidate on two or more lists simultaneously.

The same procedure applies to local elections, except that council-election lists require 100, 150 and 500 endorsements for town, city and county-council lists respectively. The city of Zagreb council is treated as a county council under election law. The number of voter signatures on mayoral and county prefect candidate nominations ranges between 50 (for mayoral elections in towns of up to 1,000 residents), 100 (for other town mayoral candidates), 500 (for mayoral elections in cities of up to 35,000 residents), 1,000 (in cities with populations between 35,000 and 100,000) and 2,000 endorsements for cities of 100,000 residents or more (with the exception of Zagreb). County prefect election candidates require 2,500 endorsements, and candidates running for mayor of Zagreb need 5,000 voter endorsements for their nominations to become valid.

Candidates running for European Parliament seats need not be Croatian citizens and may hold citizenship in any member state of the European Union, while having a permanent (or temporary) residence in Croatia. Their nominations are valid if endorsed by 5,000 Croatian voters.

=== Funding ===
The funding of political parties, independent politicians and election campaigns is relatively highly regulated in comparison with developed western democracies. Applicable legislation encompasses cash receipts, provision of free services (except the labour of volunteers), and products and other forms of support (including membership fees). The legislation also stipulates that the government budget provides funding for political parties and non-partisan political representatives in the amount of 0.05 percent of the previous year's budget expenditures. Additional funds are appropriated in local government budgets. The funds are distributed to elected members of parliament and councils, and the political parties with which they are affiliated receive 10 percent of the funds. Each election candidate (or slate) must have a dedicated bank account to handle election-campaign donations, other related funding, and all campaign-related expenditures. The maximum donation to a single party, candidate or slate made in a year is also regulated. In cases of individuals it is set at 30,000 kuna (c. 4,050 euro), regardless of purpose. Companies and other legal persons are limited to the same amount in local elections; 100,000 kuna (c. 13,500 euro) for parliamentary or European Parliament elections and 200,000 kuna (c. 27,000 euro) for presidential elections to any one candidate, party or slate (whichever is applicable). Total campaign expenditures are also limited to 8 million kuna (c. 1.08 million euro) per candidate in presidential elections, 1.5 million kuna (c. 202,000 euro) per candidate (or slate) in European Parliament or parliamentary elections, 500,000 kuna (c. 67,600 euro) per candidate in Zagreb mayoral elections and 400,000 kuna (c. 54,000 euro) per candidate in county-prefect or mayoral elections in cities of 35,000 residents or larger and in county seats. Mayoral election-campaign expenditures in other cities and towns is also limited, depending on the local government's population: 250,000 kuna (c. 33,800 euro) if the population exceeds 10,000 residents, 100,000 kuna (c. 13,500 euro) in population units of 3,000–10,000 and up to 50,000 kuna (c. 6,750 euro) in smaller self-governing units. All candidates and parties (or slates) are legally required to publish financial reports detailing their funding, which are audited by the State Electoral Commission and the State Audit Office. They are also legally required to turn over all receipts exceeding the legal limits in favour of the central government budget within eight days.

In the 2007 parliamentary elections, the leading political parties reported campaign spending as follows: the Croatian Democratic Union spent 19.5 million kuna (c. 2.6 million euro), the Social Democratic Party of Croatia spent 15.8 million kuna (c. 2.1 million euro), the Croatian People's Party – Liberal Democrats spent 9 million kuna (c. 1.2 million euro), while the Croatian Peasant Party led coalition reported spending 8 million kuna (c. 1.08 million euro) and the Croatian Party of Rights spent a similar amount.

All presidential election candidates receiving at least 10 percent of the vote are awarded an equal sum as election-campaign reimbursement. The amount is decided by the government at least 30 days before the election. This amount was set at 250,000 kuna (c. 33,800 euro) for the 2009–2010 presidential election, representing a 50-percent decrease from the sum determined for the previous presidential election (when the reimbursement sum was set at half-a-million kuna). Similarly, the government also reimburses the political parties and slates for each parliamentary seat won. For the 2011 parliamentary election, each seat will be given 180,000 kuna (c. 24,300 euro). A sum of 30,000 kuna (c. 4,050 euro) will be paid to parties or candidates failing to win any parliamentary seats if they receive more than five percent of votes in a constituency. In addition, national-minority-representative candidates running on the minority ballot failing to win parliamentary seats (but still winning at least 15 percent of votes in their constituency) will receive 27,000 kuna (c. 3,650 euro) if the minority comprises less than 1.5 percent of the total population of Croatia. All European Parliament election candidates and county-prefect and mayoral-election candidates receiving at least 10 percent of the vote are also entitled to receive reimbursement of costs in an amount determined by the government ahead of each election.

=== Media coverage and promotion ===
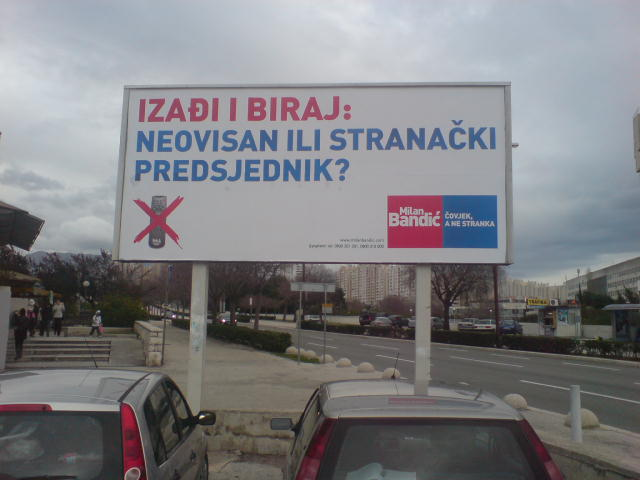
Milan Bandić's 2009–2010 presidential election advertisement

Legislation requires that all presidential and parliamentary election candidates (or slates) are guaranteed equal opportunity to present and discuss their platforms in the media (in addition to paid advertising). In 2007 the parliamentary election campaign was covered by all media, including nationwide television broadcasters. During this period the broadcasters, which included Croatian Radiotelevision (HTV), RTL Televizija (RTL) and Nova TV, aired 27.8 hours of news on 22 different programs with 1,196 news reports. This total included 171 reports dealing directly with the elections. Analysis of news coverage indicated evenly-matched coverage of the combined ruling party (HDZ) and official government statements on one side, and the main opposition party (SDP) on the other; each received an average of a 37.5-percent share of coverage and a 33-percent share of interviews aired. HTV and Nova TV gave a slight advantage to the HDZ and the government, while RTL gave more coverage to the SDP. However, the differences were small and resulted in matching ratios. Other political parties received considerably less coverage. HNS received an average of approximately 11 percent of the coverage, HSS received six percent and all other parties received less than five-percent coverage. The national television broadcasters air programs where all slates and candidates may talk about their platforms and organise debates.

Paid promotion largely followed this pattern, as the HDZ and the SDP were two dominant parties in that field as well. The Organization for Security and Co-operation in Europe (OSCE) noted in its report that the largest parties reported their advertising spending below their actual value, and the largest proportion of expenditure was for television ads. Election silence is in force on the day of the elections and the previous day, ending at 7 in the evening as polling stations close and exit polls may be published after that time.

== Voting and appeals ==
Polling stations are set up in public buildings throughout the country; voters may only vote at their assigned polling station (according to their permanent residence), but voters deployed abroad in the armed forces, voters on Croatian-flagged ships and imprisoned voters are allowed to vote elsewhere. Other voters residing in Croatia, but traveling abroad on election day may vote at Croatian diplomatic missions. Polling stations are open from 7:00 am until 7:00 pm, but all voters present at the polling stations at closing time are allowed to vote. Polling stations may be closed early if all registered voters have voted. Presidential election ballots contain a list of candidates verified by the State Electoral Commission, in alphabetical order. This entails the name and PIN of each candidate, and the names of political parties endorsing the candidate (or a note that the candidate is running as an independent). The names are preceded by ordinal numbers. Parliamentary election and European Parliament election ballots contain the name of the slate and the name of the person heading the list, in addition to candidates, who is not necessarily a candidate on the particular list, but may be included as a figurehead symbolizing specific political party or a coalition putting forward the list—usually head of the party of coalition at the national level. The lists are in alphabetical order and preceded by an ordinal number. Voting is done by circling the number associated with a particular candidate. Ballots marked otherwise (but positively indicating a candidate for which a vote is cast) are also considered valid. Blank ballots and ballots on which multiple numbers are circled (or multiple candidates are otherwise indicated) are invalid. Official results are announced and published by the State Electoral Commission.

=== Voter registry ===
The register of voters in Croatia is defined by law. The register lists all citizens of Croatia aged 18 and over, except those who have been stripped of their voting rights by a court decision. The register is organized according to legal residence (prebivalište) and maintained by government offices in counties and the city of Zagreb. Each citizen of Croatia may request a review of the register and amendments to personal information (supported by applicable documents). The voter register is used to confirm the right to vote at the polling station and to verify voter endorsements of candidates and election lists submitted to the electoral commissions. Voters who expect to travel in Croatia or abroad on election day may require inclusion in a provisional list which allows them to vote at a polling station other than that assigned to them by residence. Failing that, a voter may obtain an excerpt from the registry on election day to be allowed to vote.

A pattern of irregularities has been discovered concerning the updating of the list when citizens of Croatia turn 18 or die. In 2005, it was estimated that the register contained a large number of irregularities and erroneous entries. Since then, public attention was directed to the issue by NGOs monitoring elections through roundtables and advertising campaigns; according to GONG—a NGO specializing in election monitoring—although the register was improved, there is room for further improvement. The 2011 census also indicated a large number of voters in the registry who should not be there, leading to claims that up to a half-million voters in the registry should not be included.

=== Complaints and appeals ===
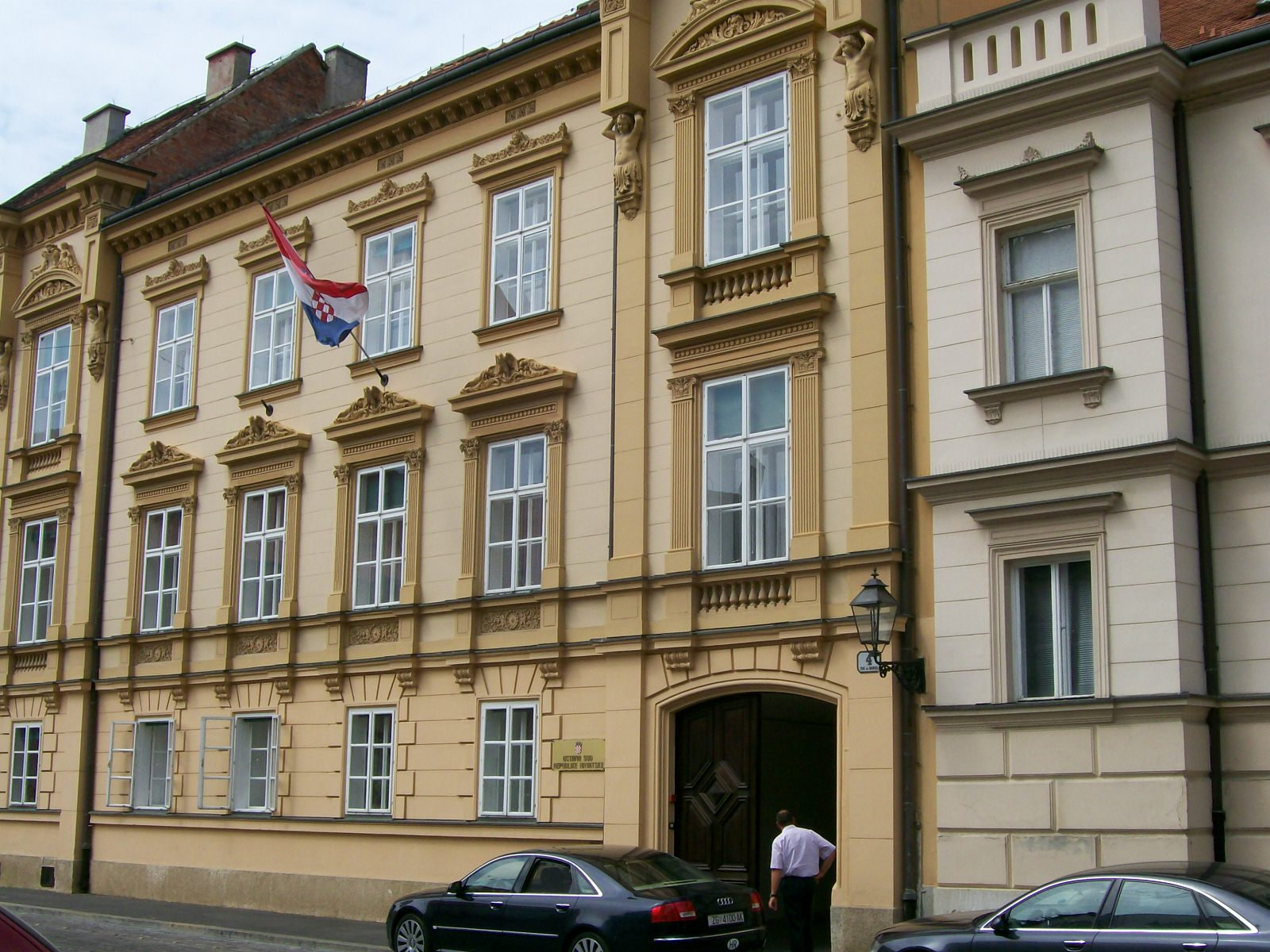
Building of the Constitutional Court of Croatia at St. Mark's Square, Zagreb

Political parties, candidates and voters who have endorsed a particular candidate (or state) in presidential, parliamentary or European Parliament elections may file complaints with the State Electoral Commission regarding irregularities in the election process within 48 hours of a disputed activity. In the European Parliament elections, voter complaints are required to be endorsed by at least 100 voters (or five percent of the voters). If the commission finds the complaint valid, it will order the part of the election process directly affected by the disputed activity to be repeated (possibly postponing the election date if there is insufficient time left). The commission must provide its decision within 48 hours after the complaint is submitted. The decision may be appealed before the Constitutional Court of Croatia within 48 hours of its receipt and once petitioned, the court must return a ruling within 48 hours. In local council elections, complaints are processed by county, city or town electoral commissions (as appropriate). In mayoral elections, complaints are filed with the county electoral commission. This does not apply to Zagreb mayoral elections, where complaints are submitted to the State Electoral Commission (the case also in county prefect elections). The time allowances and appeals procedure are the same as for presidential and parliamentary elections.

=== Monitoring ===
Elections are governed by the State Electoral Commission and electoral boards. Members of those bodies are required to have a university degree in law, and they may not be members of any political party. The State Electoral Commission prepares and manages elections in accordance with legislation, appoints lower-ranking election-commission and board members, issues directives to such bodies and supervises their work. The State Electoral Commission compiles and publishes candidate lists, supervises the legality of political campaigns and compiles and publishes election results. All members of election boards (or their legal deputies) must be present at assigned polling stations at all times while the polling station is open. The board verifies the identity of voters against the list of registered voters and records the turnout. The turnout number is later checked against number of votes cast; if the number of votes exceeds the turnout, the election at that polling station must be repeated. Votes are tallied by hand, and that information is forwarded (along with all other records kept at the polling station) to the State Electoral Commission.

Further monitoring is performed by non-governmental organizations specializing in election monitoring, such as GONG. There are also other monitoring organisations headquartered in Croatia and abroad; the OSCE set up a limited monitoring mission to observe the 2009–2010 presidential elections. The last parliamentary election (held in 2007) was monitored by 8,540 observers fielded by a number of organisations and political parties.

== See also ==
- Electoral calendar
- Electoral system
