= Electoral district XII (Croatian Parliament) =

Electoral district XII (Croatian: XII. izborna jedinica) is one of twelve electoral districts of Croatian Parliament.

== Electorate ==
Electoral district for national minorities in Croatia elects their representatives with the district covering all of Croatia.

== Election ==
=== Serbs ===
==== 2000 Elections ====
Candidate	Party	Votes	%
Milan Đukić	SNS	12.396	47.72
Milorad Pupovac	SDSS	9.171	35.50
Veselin Pejnović	Ind.	2.944	11.33
Svetozar Livada	SRP	1.467	5.65
Total		25.978	100
Valid votes		25.978	93.48
Invalid/blank votes		1.811	6.52
Total votes		27.789	16.48
Registered voters		168.606	
Source: Results

==== 2003 Elections ====
Candidate	Party	Votes	%
Vojislav Stanimirović	SDSS	25.773	22.16
Milorad Pupovac	SDSS	25.210	21.67
Ratko Gajica	SDSS	16.092	13.83
Milan Đukić	SNS	15.661	13.46
others		33.586	28.87
Total		116.322	100
Valid votes		46.126	96.88
Invalid/blank votes		1.484	3.12
Total votes		47.610	21.37
Registered voters		222.769	
Source: Results

==== 2007 Elections ====
Candidate	Party	Votes	%
Milorad Pupovac	SDSS	15.466	25.28
Vojislav Stanimirović	SDSS	13.122	21.45
Ratko Gajica	SDSS	9.683	15.83
Radivoj Rade Leskovac	PPS	6.694	10.94
others		16.205	26.50
Total		61.170	100
Valid votes		25.062	97.36
Invalid/blank votes		679	2.64
Total votes		25.741	13.51
Registered voters		190.510	
Source: Results Archived 2022-11-28 at the Wayback Machine

==== 2011 Elections ====
Candidate	Party	Votes	%
Milorad Pupovac	SDSS	14.541	26.03
Vojislav Stanimirović	SDSS	14.188	25.40
Jovo Vuković	SDSS	12.249	21.93
Jovan Ajduković	SNS - DPS - NS	4.813	8.62
Veljko Džakula	SNS - DPS - NS	3.579	6.41
others		6.476	11.61
Total		55.846	100
Valid votes		22.350	97.46
Invalid/blank votes		583	2.54
Total votes		22.933	12.46
Registered voters		183.992	
Source: Results Archived 2022-11-28 at the Wayback Machine

==== 2015 Elections ====
Candidate	Party	Votes	%
Milorad Pupovac	SDSS	14.103	75.91
Mile Horvat	SDSS	10.997	59.19
Mirko Rašković	SDSS	10.103	54.38
Srđan Milaković	Ind.	2.995	16.12
Siniša Ljubojević	Ind.	2.690	14.48
Jovan Ajduković	NS	1.681	9.05
others		2.778	14.96
Total		45.346	100
Valid votes		18.578	97.90
Invalid/blank votes		398	2.10
Total votes		18.976	14.63
Registered voters		129.683	
Source: Results

==== 2016 Elections ====
Candidate	Party	Votes	%
Milorad Pupovac	SDSS	16.166	84.55
Mile Horvat	SDSS	12.175	63.68
Boris Milošević	SDSS	11.479	60.04
Srđan Milaković	DSS	2.368	12.38
Siniša Ljubojević	DSS	2.139	11.19
Jovica Radmanović	DSS	1.879	9.83
Jovan Ajduković	NS	1.452	7.59
Total		47.658	100
Valid votes		19.120	97.88
Invalid/blank votes		414	2.12
Total votes		19.534	14.10
Registered voters		138.539	
Source: Results Archived 2022-11-28 at the Wayback Machine

==== 2020 Elections ====
Candidate	Party	Votes	%
Milorad Pupovac	SDSS	10.773	81.44
Dragana Jeckov	SDSS	8.376	63.32
Boris Milošević	SDSS	7.715	58.32
Srđan Milaković	DSS	2.010	15.20
Siniša Ljubojević	DSS	1.196	9.04
Jovica Radmanović	DSS	1.178	8.91
Total		31.248	100
Valid votes		13.228	97.62
Invalid/blank votes		323	2.38
Total votes		13.551	99.90
Registered voters		13.565	
Source: Results Archived 2022-11-28 at the Wayback Machine

==== 2024 Elections ====
Candidate	Party	Votes	%
Milorad Pupovac	SDSS	11.660	75.96
Anja Šimpraga	SDSS	10.842	70.62
Dragana Jeckov	SDSS	10.344	67.37
Srđan Milaković	DSS	2.189	14.26
Dragan Crnogorac	Ind.	1.869	12.17
Total		36.904	100
Valid votes		15.353	96.37
Invalid/blank votes		579	3.63
Total votes		15.932	99.96
Registered voters		15.939	
Source: Results

=== Hungarians ===
==== 2000 Elections ====
Candidate	Party	Votes	%
Tibor Santo	DZMH	1.892	42.88
Deneš Šoja	Ind.	1.567	35.52
Peter Sekereš	MKD "Ady Endre"	539	12.22
Josip Šereš	HSP	414	9.38
Total		4.412	100
Valid votes		4.412	96.10
Invalid/blank votes		179	3.90
Total votes		4.591	49.08
Registered voters		9.354	
Source: Results Archived 2022-12-03 at the Wayback Machine

==== 2003 Elections ====
Candidate	Party	Votes	%
Jene Adam	DZMH	1.714	42.01
Deneš Šoja	SMU	1.627	39.88
Bandi Kučera	Ind.	381	9.34
Emma Raucher	HSS	358	8.77
Total		4.080	100
Valid votes		4.080	97.05
Invalid/blank votes		124	2.95
Total votes		4.204	40.56
Registered voters		10.366	
Source: Results Archived 2022-12-03 at the Wayback Machine

==== 2007 Elections ====
Candidate	Party	Votes	%
Deneš Šoja	SMU	2.040	47.83
Róbert Jankovics	DZMH	1.975	46.31
others		250	5.86
Total		4.265	100
Valid votes		4.265	98.57
Invalid/blank votes		62	1.43
Total votes		4.327	44.98
Registered voters		9.619	
Source: Results Archived 2022-12-03 at the Wayback Machine

==== 2011 Elections ====
Candidate	Party	Votes	%
Deneš Šoja	SMU	2.441	51.53
Róbert Jankovics	DZMH	2.296	48.47
Total		4.737	100
Valid votes		4.737	98.73
Invalid/blank votes		61	1.27
Total votes		4.798	49.31
Registered voters		9.731	
Source: Results Archived 2022-12-03 at the Wayback Machine

==== 2015 Elections ====
Candidate	Party	Votes	%
Šandor Juhas	SMU	2.218	50.23
Róbert Jankovics	DZMH	2.198	49.77
Total		4.416	100
Valid votes		4.416	98.68
Invalid/blank votes		59	1.32
Total votes		4.475	49.02
Registered voters		9.129	
Source: Results Archived 2022-12-03 at the Wayback Machine

==== 2016 Elections ====
Candidate	Party	Votes	%
Róbert Jankovics	DZMH	2.731	53.02
Šandor Juhas	SMU	2.420	46.98
Total		5.151	100
Valid votes		5.151	98.83
Invalid/blank votes		61	1.17
Total votes		5.212	52.22
Registered voters		9.981	
Source: Results Archived 2023-05-18 at the Wayback Machine

==== 2020 Elections ====
Candidate	Party	Votes	%
Róbert Jankovics	DZMH	2.807	100.00
Total		2.807	100
Valid votes		2.807	98.77
Invalid/blank votes		35	1.23
Total votes		2.842	99.96
Registered voters		2.843	
Source: Results

==== 2024 Elections ====
Candidate	Party	Votes	%
Róbert Jankovics	DZMH	2.804	100.00
Total		2.804	100
Valid votes		2.804	97.46
Invalid/blank votes		73	2.54
Total votes		2.877	100.00
Registered voters		2.877	
Source: Results

=== Italians ===
==== 2000 Elections ====
Candidate	Party	Votes	%
Furio Radin	Ind.	5.152	78.91
Tullio Persi	Ind.	563	8.62
Valmer Cusma	Ind.	483	7.40
others		331	5.07
Total		6.529	100
Valid votes		6.529	96.23
Invalid/blank votes		256	3.77
Total votes		6.785	63.39
Registered voters		10.704	
Source: Results Archived 2022-12-03 at the Wayback Machine

==== 2003 Elections ====
Candidate	Party	Votes	%
Furio Radin	Ind.	4.669	79.83
Tullio Persi	IDF	469	8.02
Dario Bognolo	Ind.	329	5.62
others		382	6.53
Total		5.849	100
Valid votes		5.849	96.66
Invalid/blank votes		202	3.34
Total votes		6.051	48.33
Registered voters		12.520	
Source: Results Archived 2022-12-03 at the Wayback Machine

==== 2007 Elections ====
Candidate	Party	Votes	%
Furio Radin	Ind.	4.177	88.82
Denis Stefan	Ind.	275	5.85
Lucio Slama	RI	251	5.34
Total		4.703	100
Valid votes		4.703	97.22
Invalid/blank votes		100	2.08
Total votes		4.803	42.77
Registered voters/		11.230	
Source: Results Archived 2022-12-03 at the Wayback Machine

==== 2011 Elections ====
Candidate	Party	Votes	%
Furio Radin	Ind.	3.067	100.00
Total		3.067	100
Valid votes		3.067	87.15
Invalid/blank votes		90	2.85
Total votes		3.157	31.55
Registered voters		10.005	
Source: Results Archived 2022-12-03 at the Wayback Machine

==== 2015 Elections ====
Candidate	Party	Votes	%
Furio Radin	Ind.	1.594	65.84
Maurizio Zennaro	Ind.	676	27.92
Daniela Dapas	ORAH	151	6.24
Total		2.421	100
Valid votes		2.421	98.94
Invalid/blank votes		26	1.06
Total votes		2.447	23.73
Registered voters		10.312	
Source: Results Archived 2022-12-03 at the Wayback Machine

==== 2016 Elections ====
Candidate	Party	Votes	%
Furio Radin	Ind.	1.676	72.65
Maurizio Zennaro	Ind.	631	27.35
Total		2.307	100
Valid votes		2.307	98.67
Invalid/blank votes		31	1.33
Total votes		2.338	20.44
Registered voters/turnout		11.440	
Source: Results Archived 2022-12-03 at the Wayback Machine

==== 2020 Elections ====
Candidate	Party	Votes	%
Furio Radin	Ind.	890	100.00
Total		890	100
Valid votes		890	93.78
Invalid/blank votes		59	6.22
Total votes		949	99.89
Registered voters		950	
Source: Results Archived 2022-12-03 at the Wayback Machine

==== 2024 Elections ====
Candidate	Party	Votes	%
Furio Radin	Ind.	971	50.92
Corrado Dussich	Ind.	936	49.08
Total		1.907	100
Valid votes		1.907	97.74
Invalid/blank votes		44	2.26
Total votes		1.951	100.00
Registered voters		1.951	
Source: Results

=== Czechs-Slovaks ===
==== 2000 Elections ====
Candidate	Party	Votes	%
Zdenka Čuhnil	HSS	1.401	40.62
Ana Vodvarka	SČRH	877	25.43
Njegovan Starek	Ind.	421	12.21
Andrija Pekar	SSRH	303	8.79
Bohumil Kopecky	Ind.	178	5.16
others		269	7.79
Total		3.449	100
Valid votes		3.449	96.58
Invalid/blank votes		122	3.42
Total votes		3.571	57.76
Registered voters		6.182	
Source: Results Archived 2022-12-03 at the Wayback Machine

==== 2003 Elections ====
Candidate	Party	Votes	%
Zdenka Čuhnil	HSS	1.277	39.21
Andrija Kuric	SSRH	645	19.80
Zlatko Vavra	HDZ	433	13.29
Velimir Lalić	LS	414	12.71
Ante Zadro	Libra	282	8.66
others		206	6.33
Total		3.257	100
Valid votes		3.257	97.02
Invalid/blank votes		100	2.98
Total votes		3.357	45.45
Registered voters		7.386	
Source: Results

==== 2007 Elections ====
Candidate	Party	Votes	%
Zdenka Čuhnil	Ind.	684	26.04
Vladimir Bilek	Ind.	681	25.92
Juraj Fofonjka	Ind.	424	16.14
Jasna Vaniček-Fila	Ind.	309	11.76
Andrija Kuric	SSL	282	10.73
others		247	9.41
Total		2.627	100
Valid votes		2.627	98.65
Invalid/blank votes		36	1.35
Total votes		2.663	42.50
Registered voters		6.266	
Source: Results Archived 2022-12-03 at the Wayback Machine

==== 2011 Elections ====
Candidate	Party	Votes	%
Vladimir Bilek	SDP - HNS - IDS - HSU	1.510	45.39
Zdenka Čuhnil	ČB Končanica - MS Josipovac - ČB Sisak	804	24.17
Ivan Komak	SSL	763	22.93
others		250	7.51
Total		3.327	100
Valid votes		3.327	99.02
Invalid/blank votes		33	0.98
Total votes		3.360	48.51
Registered voters		6.927	
Source: Results Archived 2022-12-03 at the Wayback Machine

==== 2015 Elections ====
Candidate	Party	Votes	%
Vladimir Bilek	Ind.	1.598	75.73
Ivan Komak	Ind.	512	24.27
Total		2.110	100
Valid votes		2.110	99.20
Invalid/blank votes		17	0.80
Total votes		2.127	32.95
Registered voters		6.456	
Source: Results

==== 2016 Elections ====
Candidate	Party	Votes	%
Vladimir Bilek	Ind.	1.329	84.43
Ivan Komak	Ind.	245	15.57
Total		1.574	100
Valid votes		1.574	98.99
Invalid/blank votes		16	1.01
Total votes		1.590	23.51
Registered voters		6.763	
Source: Results Archived 2022-12-03 at the Wayback Machine

==== 2020 Elections ====
Candidate	Party	Votes	%
Vladimir Bilek	Ind.	1.514	89.37
Ivan Komak	MS Osijek	180	10.63
Total		1.694	100
Valid votes		1.694	99.35
Invalid/blank votes		11	0.65
Total votes		1.705	100.00
Registered voters		1.705	
Source: Results Archived 2022-12-03 at the Wayback Machine

==== 2024 Elections ====
Candidate	Party	Votes	%
Vladimir Bilek	Ind.	1.764	93.04
Ivan Komak	MS Osijek	132	6.96
Total		1.896	100
Valid votes		1.896	99.42
Invalid/blank votes		11	0.58
Total votes		1.908	100.00
Registered voters		1.908	
Source: Results

=== Bosniaks ===
==== 2003 Elections ====
Candidate	Party	Votes	%
Šemso Tanković	SDA	2.711	59.10
Darko Šonc	SSDRH	630	13.73
Sulejman Tabaković	Ind.	311	6.78
Simon Kuzhnini	Ind.	278	6.06
others		657	14.33
Total		4.587	100
Valid votes		4.587	97.06
Invalid/blank votes		139	2.94
Total votes		4.726	21.55
Registered voters		21.930	
Source: Results Archived 2022-12-07 at the Wayback Machine

==== 2007 Elections ====
Candidate	Party	Votes	%
Šemso Tanković	SDA	1.348	30.85
Nedžad Hodžić	Ind.	1.187	27.16
Luigj Daka	UAKZ	363	8.31
Hamdija Malić	UBBDRH - UDBBDRH Zagreb - UDBBDRH Rijeka - KUD Bosna - BKUD Nur: BNZ Labin - BNZ Dubrovnik-DNŽ - UBBDRH Dubrovnik-DNŽ - KDB Preporod; UZHO Nikola Šubić Zrinski - SABAH - UBBDRH Sisak-SMŽ	312	7.14
Ibrahim Ružnić	HNS	238	5.45
Bashkim Shehu	FAI	236	5.40
Frok Prekpalaj	AKD Shkëndija	220	5.03
others		466	10.66
Total		4.370	100
Valid votes		4.370	96.60
Invalid/blank votes		154	3.40
Total votes		4.524	21.16
Registered voters		21.380	
Source: Results Archived 2022-12-07 at the Wayback Machine

==== 2011 Elections ====
Candidate	Party	Votes	%
Nedžad Hodžić	BDSH	1.628	25.51
Ermina Lekaj Prljaskaj	UZARH	1.554	25.30
Šemso Tanković	SDA	1.077	17.54
Idriz Bešić	Ind.	953	15.52
others		930	16.13
Total		6.142	100
Valid votes		6.142	98.54
Invalid/blank votes		91	1.46
Total votes		6.233	23.69
Registered voters		26.312	
Source: Results

==== 2015 Elections ====
Candidate	Party	Votes	%
Ermina Lekaj Prljaskaj	FAI - KUANM Zadar - ZU Hasi - UKRH Kosova	999	21.19
Idris Sulejmani	ZAIŽ	994	21.09
Nedžad Hodžić	BDSH	755	16.02
Mirsad Srebreniković	SDA	711	15.08
Jonuz Aliti	Ind.	375	7.96
Alen Džomba	NH - UBBDRH VSŽ - BKUD Behar	306	6.49
others		574	12.17
Total		4.714	100
Valid votes		4.714	98.95
Invalid/blank votes		50	1.05
Total votes		4.764	17.79
Registered voters		26.774	
Source: Results

==== 2016 Elections ====
Candidate	Party	Votes	%
Ermina Lekaj Prljaskaj	UARH	1.354	25.31
Mirza Mešić	Ind.	1.177	22.00
Idris Sulejmani	Ind.	1.085	20.28
Nedžad Hodžić	BDSH	666	12.45
Mirsad Srebreniković	SDA	618	11.55
others		450	8.41
Total		5.350	100
Valid votes		5.350	99.15
Invalid/blank votes		46	0.85
Total votes		5.396	18.12
Registered voters		29.777	
Source: Results

==== 2020 Elections ====
Candidate	Party	Votes	%
Ermina Lekaj Prljaskaj	UARH	1.725	31.82
Bermin Meškić	SDA	1.152	21.25
Idris Sulejmani	UGANM Poreč - UANM Poreštine	1.026	18.93
Armin Hodžić	Ind.	861	15.88
Nedžad Hodžić	Ind.	498	9.19
others		159	2.93
Total		5.421	100
Valid votes		5.421	98.98
Invalid/blank votes		56	1.02
Total votes		5.477	99.93
Registered voters		5.481	
Source: Results

==== 2024 Elections ====
Candidate	Party	Votes	%
Armin Hodžić	BZ	3.357	47.04
Ermina Lekaj Prljaskaj	UARH	2.249	31.51
Šoip Šoipi	Ind.	1.414	19.81
Sulejman Tabaković	Ind.	117	1.64
Total		7.137	100
Valid votes		7.137	99.04
Invalid/blank votes		69	0.96
Total votes		7.206	99.90
Registered voters		7.213	
Source: Results

=== Others ===
==== 2000 Elections ====
Candidate	Party	Votes	%
Borislav Graljuk	SRUH	342	34.10
Slavko Burda	KPDRU Zagreb	186	18.54
Nikola Mak	NNZ-ZUPŠH Osijek	167	16.65
Vesna Pichler	SNAH Osijek	161	16.05
Jasminka Petter	NSNH	59	5.88
Nikola Zastrižni	Ind.	57	5.68
others		31	3.10
Total		1.003	100
Valid votes		1.003	95.61
Invalid/blank votes		46	4.39
Total votes		1.049	32.54
Registered voters		3.224	
Source: Results Archived 2022-12-07 at the Wayback Machine

==== 2003 Elections ====
Candidate	Party	Votes	%
Nikola Mak	NNZ-ZUPŠH Osijek	265	14.29
Borislav Graljuk	LS	251	13.54
Nada Bajić	Rusnak	222	11.97
Ivan Rumbak	HPS	214	11.54
Nazif Memedi	Ind.	210	11.33
Gabrijel Takač	SRUH	163	8.79
Irinej Mudri	KUD Osif Kostelnik Vukovar	152	8.20
Slavko Burda	KPDRU Zagreb	121	6.53
others		256	13.81
Total		1.854	100
Valid votes		1.854	95.91
Invalid/blank votes		79	4.09
Total votes		1.933	21.70
Registered voters		8.908	
Source: Results

==== 2007 Elections ====
Candidate	Party	Votes	%
Nazif Memedi	MRUH	351	12.76
Nada Bajić	HNS	314	11.41
Renata Trischler	NNZ-ZUPŠH Osijek	236	8.58
Viktor Filima	Ind.	228	8.29
Bajro Bajrić	URRH	224	8.14
Nusret Seferović	Ind.	214	7.78
Željko Balog	KZBH	175	6.36
Željko Bogdan	URV	175	6.36
Vesna Pichler	SNAH Osijek	140	5.09
Sami Ališan	SDP - SDA - HRDS	140	5.09
others		554	20.14
Total		2.751	100
Valid votes		2.751	97.38
Invalid/blank votes		74	2.62
Total votes		2.825	28.55
Registered voters		9.894	
Source: Results

==== 2011 Elections ====
Candidate	Party	Votes	%
Veljko Kajtazi	CPI EU	863	18.88
Željko Balog	KZBH	839	18.35
Nazif Memedi	NAU	544	11.90
Renata Trischler	NNZ-ZUPŠH Osijek	371	8.11
Bajro Bajrić	HSLS	303	6.63
Milan Ignac	Ind.	270	5.91
others		1.382	30.22
Total		4.572	100
Valid votes		4.572	98.64
Invalid/blank votes		63	1.36
Total votes		4.635	35.21
Registered voters		13.163	
Source: Results

==== 2015 Elections ====
Candidate	Party	Votes	%
Veljko Kajtazi	UZOR Kali Sara	1.913	41.41
Željko Balog	NH - KZRH	778	16.84
Muhamed Zahirović	BM365 - DPS - DSŽ - HES - HRS - HSZ - ID: MS - NSH - Novi val - SU - UDU - Zeleni - ZS	638	13.81
Robert Bosak	HDZ	539	11.67
Duško Kostić	URP Luna	258	5.58
others		488	10.69
Total		4.620	100
Valid votes		4.620	98.42
Invalid/blank votes		74	1.58
Total votes		4.694	33.31
Registered voters		14.093	
Source: Results Archived 2022-12-07 at the Wayback Machine

==== 2016 Elections ====
Candidate	Party	Votes	%
Veljko Kajtazi	SRRH Kali Sara	2.010	53.16
Robert Bosak	Ind.	1.107	29.28
Nura Ismailovski	BM365 - NS R - Novi val - HSS SR - BUZ	303	8.01
others		361	9.55
Total		3.781	100
Valid votes		3.781	98.67
Invalid/blank votes		51	1.33
Total votes		3.832	25.95
Registered voters		14.767	
Source: Results Archived 2022-12-07 at the Wayback Machine

==== 2020 Elections ====
Candidate	Party	Votes	%
Veljko Kajtazi	SRRH Kali Sara	3.745	78.48
Franjo Horvat	URKPK	673	14.10
Robert Bosak	Ind.	305	6.39
others		49	1.03
Total		4.772	100
Valid votes		4.772	98.94
Invalid/blank votes		51	1.06
Total votes		4.823	99.96
Registered voters		4.825	
Source: Results

==== 2024 Elections ====
Candidate	Party	Votes	%
Veljko Kajtazi	SRRH Kali Sara	3.017	62.12
Franjo Horvat	URKPK	1.400	28.82
Elvis Kralj	Ind.	440	9.06
Total		4.857	100
Valid votes		4.857	98.62
Invalid/blank votes		68	1.38
Total votes		4.925	99.88
Registered voters		4.931	
Source: Results
