= List of members of the Sabor, 2011–2015 =

The seventh Sabor was inaugurated on 22 December 2011. The assembly came into existence following the December 2011 parliamentary election and consisted of 151 representatives elected from 10 geographical and two special electoral districts. It dissolved formally on 28 September 2015, with the next parliamentary election held on 8 November 2015.

== Parliamentary officials ==
The Speaker of the Croatian Parliament (or President) from 22 December 2011 until his death on 30 September 2012 was Boris Šprem, member of the Social Democratic Party of Croatia. Deputy speaker Josip Leko was acting Speaker of the Sabor until himself being elected as the new Speaker.

Vice presidents of Sabor were Dragica Zgrebec (SDP), Nenad Stazić (SDP), Milorad Batinić (SDP), Tomislav Čuljak (HDZ) and Željko Reiner (HDZ).

Jadranka Kosor and Vladimir Šeks, two HDZ's vice presidents, were removed from their posts on 12 June 2012 during a session of HDZ's presidency and replaced by Čuljak and Reiner. Dragica Zgrebec was named a new Vice president to replace Josip Leko who had been elected Speaker after the death of Boris Šprem.

== Composition ==
On the basis of the parliamentary election of 2011, the composition of the Sabor as of December 2011 is as follows:

=== By parliamentary club ===
Party	December 2011
Social Democratic Party of Croatia (SDP)	61
Croatian Democratic Union (HDZ)	47
Croatian People's Party – Liberal Democrats (HNS)	15
National minority club	8
Croatian Labourists - Labour Party (Laburisti)	6
Croatian Democratic Alliance of Slavonia and Baranja (HDSSB)	6
Istrian Democratic Assembly (IDS)	3
Croatian Party of Pensioners (HSU)	3
Independent Democratic Serb Party (SDSS)	3
Non-Inscrits	TBA
Total	151

=== By political party ===
Party	December 2011
Social Democratic Party of Croatia (SDP)	60
Croatian Democratic Union (HDZ)	45
Croatian People's Party – Liberal Democrats (HNS)	14
Croatian Labourists - Labour Party (Laburisti)	6
Croatian Democratic Alliance of Slavonia and Baranja (HDSSB)	6
Istrian Democratic Assembly (IDS)	3
Croatian Party of Pensioners (HSU)	3
Independent Democratic Serb Party (SDSS)	3
Croatian Civic Party (HGS)	2
Croatian Party of Rights dr. Ante Starčević (HSP-AS)	1
Croatian Peasant Party (HSS)	1
Democratic Centre (DC)	0
Bosniak Democratic Party of Croatia (BDSH)	1
Independents	6
Total	151

=== MPs by party ===
Party	Name	Constituency
Social Democratic Party of Croatia (60)	Ingrid Antičević-Marinović	District 9
Social Democratic Party of Croatia (60)	Vedran Babić	District 2
Social Democratic Party of Croatia (60)	Arsen Bauk	
Social Democratic Party of Croatia (60)	Josip Benčić	District 7
Social Democratic Party of Croatia (60)	Davor Bernardić	District 1
Social Democratic Party of Croatia (60)	Biljana Borzan	District 4
Social Democratic Party of Croatia (60)	Nada Čavlović-Smiljanec	
Social Democratic Party of Croatia (60)	Luka Denona	District 7
Social Democratic Party of Croatia (60)	Igor Dragovan	
Social Democratic Party of Croatia (60)	Vesna Fabijančić-Križanić	
Social Democratic Party of Croatia (60)	Gvozden Srećko Flego	
Social Democratic Party of Croatia (60)	Peđa Grbin	
Social Democratic Party of Croatia (60)	Branko Grčić	
Social Democratic Party of Croatia (60)	Mario Habek	
Social Democratic Party of Croatia (60)	Siniša Hajdaš Dončić	
Social Democratic Party of Croatia (60)	Domagoj Hajduković	
Social Democratic Party of Croatia (60)	Mirela Holy	
Social Democratic Party of Croatia (60)	Tonka Ivčević	
Social Democratic Party of Croatia (60)	Tihomir Jakovina	
Social Democratic Party of Croatia (60)	Nadica Jelaš	
Social Democratic Party of Croatia (60)	Ivo Jelušić	
Social Democratic Party of Croatia (60)	Romana Jerković	
Social Democratic Party of Croatia (60)	Željko Jovanović	
Social Democratic Party of Croatia (60)	Marin Jurjević	
Social Democratic Party of Croatia (60)	Željko Kolar	
Social Democratic Party of Croatia (60)	Zlatko Komadina	
Social Democratic Party of Croatia (60)	Ana Devčić-Komparić	
Social Democratic Party of Croatia (60)	Ante Kotromanović	
Social Democratic Party of Croatia (60)	Darko Ledinski	
Social Democratic Party of Croatia (60)	Josip Leko	
Social Democratic Party of Croatia (60)	Šime Lučin	
Social Democratic Party of Croatia (60)	Marija Lugarić	
Social Democratic Party of Croatia (60)	Gordan Maras	
Social Democratic Party of Croatia (60)	Damir Mateljan	
Social Democratic Party of Croatia (60)	Marina Merzel-Lovrić	
Social Democratic Party of Croatia (60)	Neven Mimica	
Social Democratic Party of Croatia (60)	Zoran Milanović	
Social Democratic Party of Croatia (60)	Mario Moharić	
Social Democratic Party of Croatia (60)	Daniel Mondekar	
Social Democratic Party of Croatia (60)	Mirando Mrsić	
Social Democratic Party of Croatia (60)	Zvonimir Mršić	
Social Democratic Party of Croatia (60)	Milanka Opačić	
Social Democratic Party of Croatia (60)	Rajko Ostojić	
Social Democratic Party of Croatia (60)	Ranko Ostojić	
Social Democratic Party of Croatia (60)	Tonino Picula	
Social Democratic Party of Croatia (60)	Igor Rađenović	
Social Democratic Party of Croatia (60)	Zdravko Ronko	
Social Democratic Party of Croatia (60)	Željko Sabo	
Social Democratic Party of Croatia (60)	Tomislav Saucha	
Social Democratic Party of Croatia (60)	Gordana Sobol	
Social Democratic Party of Croatia (60)	Nenad Stazić	
Social Democratic Party of Croatia (60)	Tatjana Šimac-Bonačić	
Social Democratic Party of Croatia (60)	Boris Šprem	
Social Democratic Party of Croatia (60)	Damir Tornić	
Social Democratic Party of Croatia (60)	Franko Vidović	
Social Democratic Party of Croatia (60)	Tanja Vrbat	
Social Democratic Party of Croatia (60)	Josip Vuković	
Social Democratic Party of Croatia (60)	Dragica Zgrebec	
Social Democratic Party of Croatia (60)	Mihael Zmajlović	
Social Democratic Party of Croatia (60)	Tomislav Žagar	
Croatian Democratic Union (44)	Branko Bačić	
Croatian Democratic Union (44)	Martina Banić	
Croatian Democratic Union (44)	Josip Borić	
Croatian Democratic Union (44)	Davor Božinović	
Croatian Democratic Union (44)	Milijan Brkić	
Croatian Democratic Union (44)	Petar Čobanković	
Croatian Democratic Union (44)	Tomislav Čuljak	
Croatian Democratic Union (44)	Martina Dalić	
Croatian Democratic Union (44)	Josip Đakić	
Croatian Democratic Union (44)	Ilija Filipović	
Croatian Democratic Union (44)	Sunčana Glavak	
Croatian Democratic Union (44)	Tomislav Ivić	
Croatian Democratic Union (44)	Gordan Jandroković	
Croatian Democratic Union (44)	Perica Jelečević	
Croatian Democratic Union (44)	Milan Jurković	
Croatian Democratic Union (44)	Božidar Kalmeta	
Croatian Democratic Union (44)	Tomislav Karamarko	
Croatian Democratic Union (44)	Jadranka Kosor	
Croatian Democratic Union (44)	Damir Krstičević	
Croatian Democratic Union (44)	Ante Kulušić	
Croatian Democratic Union (44)	Branko Kutija	
Croatian Democratic Union (44)	Franjo Lucić	
Croatian Democratic Union (44)	Dujomir Marasović	
Croatian Democratic Union (44)	Danijel Marušić	
Croatian Democratic Union (44)	Frano Matušić	
Croatian Democratic Union (44)	Jasen Mesić	
Croatian Democratic Union (44)	Zvonko Milas	
Croatian Democratic Union (44)	Stjepan Milinković	
Croatian Democratic Union (44)	Darko Milinović	
Croatian Democratic Union (44)	Ivan Domagoj Milošević	
Croatian Democratic Union (44)	Davorin Mlakar	
Croatian Democratic Union (44)	Goran Pauk	
Croatian Democratic Union (44)	Andrej Plenković	
Croatian Democratic Union (44)	Đuro Popijač	
Croatian Democratic Union (44)	Željko Reiner	
Croatian Democratic Union (44)	Josip Salapić	
Croatian Democratic Union (44)	Ante Sanader	
Croatian Democratic Union (44)	Davor Ivo Stier	
Croatian Democratic Union (44)	Đurđica Sumrak	
Croatian Democratic Union (44)	Ivan Šantek	
Croatian Democratic Union (44)	Vladimir Šeks	
Croatian Democratic Union (44)	Ivan Šuker	
Croatian Democratic Union (44)	Miroslav Tuđman	
Croatian Democratic Union (44)	Branko Vukelić	
Croatian People's Party – Liberal Democrats (14)	Petar Baranović	
Croatian People's Party – Liberal Democrats (14)	Milorad Batinić	
Croatian People's Party – Liberal Democrats (14)	Goran Beus-Richembergh	
Croatian People's Party – Liberal Democrats (14)	Vladimir Bilek	Special representative of the Czech and Slovak minorities
Croatian People's Party – Liberal Democrats (14)	Boris Blažeković	
Croatian People's Party – Liberal Democrats (14)	Radimir Čačić	
Croatian People's Party – Liberal Democrats (14)	Srđan Gjurković	
Croatian People's Party – Liberal Democrats (14)	Sonja Konig	
Croatian People's Party – Liberal Democrats (14)	Natalija Martinčević	
Croatian People's Party – Liberal Democrats (14)	Vesna Pusić	
Croatian People's Party – Liberal Democrats (14)	Jozo Radoš	
Croatian People's Party – Liberal Democrats (14)	Anđelko Topolovec	
Croatian People's Party – Liberal Democrats (14)	Nada Turina-Đurić	
Croatian People's Party – Liberal Democrats (14)	Ivan Vrdoljak	
Croatian Labourists – Labour Party (6)	Dragutin Lesar	
Croatian Labourists – Labour Party (6)	Mladen Novak	
Croatian Labourists – Labour Party (6)	Nansi Tireli	
Croatian Labourists – Labour Party (6)	Zlatko Tušak	
Croatian Labourists – Labour Party (6)	Branko Vukšić	
Croatian Labourists – Labour Party (6)	Nikola Vuljanić	
Croatian Democratic Alliance of Slavonia and Baranja (6)	Krešimir Bubalo	
Croatian Democratic Alliance of Slavonia and Baranja (6)	Dinko Burić	
Croatian Democratic Alliance of Slavonia and Baranja (6)	Ivan Drmić	
Croatian Democratic Alliance of Slavonia and Baranja (6)	Dražen Đurović	
Croatian Democratic Alliance of Slavonia and Baranja (6)	Boro Grubišić	
Croatian Democratic Alliance of Slavonia and Baranja (6)	Vladimir Šišljagić	
Istrian Democratic Assembly (3)	Valter Boljunčić	
Istrian Democratic Assembly (3)	Ivan Jakovčić	
Istrian Democratic Assembly (3)	Damir Kajin	
Croatian Party of Pensioners (3)	Višnja Fortuna	
Croatian Party of Pensioners (3)	Silvano Hrelja	
Croatian Party of Pensioners (3)	Željko Šemper	
Independent Democratic Serb Party (3)	Milorad Pupovac	Special representative of the Serb minority
Independent Democratic Serb Party (3)	Vojislav Stanimirović	Special representative of the Serb minority
Independent Democratic Serb Party (3)	Jovo Vuković	Special representative of the Serb minority
Croatian Civic Party (2)	Nevenka Bečić	
Croatian Civic Party (2)	Željko Kerum	
Croatian Party of Rights dr. Ante Starčević (1)	Ruža Tomašić	
Croatian Peasant Party (1)	Josip Friščić	
Democratic Centre (1)	Vesna Škare-Ožbolt	
Bosniak Democratic Party of Croatia (1)	Nedžad Hodžić	Special representative of the Bosniak and four other minorities
Independents (6)	Jakša Beloević	Elected on the list of Ivan Grubišić
Independents (6)	Ivan Grubišić	Elected on the list of Ivan Grubišić
Independents (6)	Veljko Kajtazi	Special representative of Roma and eleven other minorities; member of the HNS club
Independents (6)	Josip Kregar	Elected on Kukuriku District 1 list, in SDP quota.
Independents (6)	Furio Radin	Special representative of the Italian minority
Independents (6)	Deneš Šoja	Special representative of the Hungarian minority

== Changes ==
Note that a number of MPs who are high-ranking members of parties in the ruling coalition were subsequently appointed to various ministerial and governmental positions, while others continued to serve as city mayors. In such cases they are required by Croatian law to put their parliamentary mandate on hiatus for the duration of their other term of office and in the meantime their seats are then taken by a party-appointed replacement MP. Those replacements are not documented here. The table below only lists changes which affected party seat totals in the 7th Sabor.

Date	Constituency	Loss	Gain	Note
22 December 2011	6th district	DC	HDZ	Vesna Škare-Ožbolt of DC was replaced by Ivana Roksandić of HDZ
30 May 2012	4th district	HDZ	HDSSB	Josip Salapić left HDZ and joined HDSSB
3 January 2013	8th district	IDS	Independent	Damir Kajin expelled from IDS
19 April 2013	5th district	HDZ	Independent	Jadranka Kosor expelled from HDZ
23 July 2013	10th district	Independent	Independent	Jakša Baloević left IL Ivan Grubišić
21 June 2013	6th district	SDP	Independent	Mirela Holy left SDP
25 November 2013	6th district	Independent	ORaH	Mirela Holy founded ORaH
18 February 2014	6th district	HDZ	DC	Vesna Škare-Ožbolt mandate suspension ended
11 March 2014	3rd district	HNS-LD	Independent	Natalija Martinčević expelled from HNS-LD
