= 1995 Croatian parliamentary election =

- 29 October 1995
- All 127 seats in the Chamber of Representatives; 64 seats needed for a majority
- Turnout: 68.79% (▼6.82pp)
Party	Leader	Vote %	Seats	+/–
HDZ	Franjo Tuđman	45.23	75	−10
HSS–HNS–IDS	Zlatko Tomčić	18.26	18	+5
HSLS	Dražen Budiša	11.55	12	−2
SDP	Ivica Račan	8.93	10	−1
HSP	Anto Đapić	5.01	4	−1
Minority lists
SNS	Milan Đukić	60.60	2	−1
ASH	Živko Juzbašić	34.34	1	New
Independents	(Note: Sandor Jakab (Hungarian seat), Miroslav Kiš (Austrian, German, Ruthenian and Ukrainian seat), Furio Radin (Italian seat) and Njegovan Starek (Czech and Slovak seat))	–	4	0
This lists parties that won seats. See the complete results below.
Result by constituency
Voting was not held in the eastern territory still under control of the Republic of Serbian Krajina (in dark gray)
Prime Minister before	Subsequent Prime Minister
Nikica Valentić; HDZ	Zlatko Mateša; HDZ

Parliamentary elections were held in Croatia on 29 October 1995 to elect the 127 members of the Chamber of Representatives. The election was held in conjunction with special elections for Zagreb City Assembly, which resulted in the Zagreb Crisis.

The result was a victory for the Croatian Democratic Union (HDZ), which won an absolute majority of 75 seats. Voter turnout was 69%.

This was the last election to date in Croatia in which a single party won enough seats to govern alone without the need for parliamentary support from pre-election or post-election coalition partners.

== Background ==
The term of the existing Chamber of Representatives was to expire one year later, in 1996. However, the Croatian government of Franjo Tuđman and his Croatian Democratic Union party hoped to exploit national euphoria over the success of Operation Storm. The Chamber of Representatives was quickly dissolved, but not before passing yet another piece of electoral legislation, introducing a new voting system which was to improve chances of the ruling party.

According to the new electoral law, 32 seats were won in individual constituencies on First past the post basis, while 80 seats were to be distributed on the basis of proportional representation, with the threshold being raised from previous 2% to 5%.

Another addition was a raised threshold for lists of party coalitions - 8% for coalition of two parties and 11% for coalition of three and more parties. It is more than obvious that the new rules were introduced to discourage coalitions of small opposition parties and subsequently have their votes dispersed and wasted below the threshold, allowing the stronger party to get additional seats.

While 12 seats were kept for Croatian expatriates, the number of seats reserved for ethnic minorities have changed. This was most evident in the case of Serbs, who had only 3 seats compared with the previous 11.

Under such conditions, opposition parties were more concerned about their own political survival than actually challenging the ruling party. Learning from their mistakes during the 1992 elections, they created ad hoc coalitions and circumvented electoral thresholds by fielding other parties' members as their own candidates on the lists.

== Results ==
The HDZ received a similar percentage of vote and number of seats as three years earlier. More significant changes were among the ranks of the opposition; the Social Democratic Party re-emerged as a significant political factor with 9% of the vote, at the expense of the Croatian Social Liberal Party, which saw its vote share almost halved. Neither party was as successful as the large opposition coalition which included the Croatian Peasant Party, the Croatian People's Party and the Istrian Democratic Assembly.

The most tense moment of the campaign occurred during the vote count. It appeared that the Croatian Party of Rights would fail to break the 5% threshold, only for the vote to increase afterwards.

Party	Proportional			Constituency			Total seats
Party	Votes	%	Seats	Votes	%	Seats	Total seats
Croatian Democratic Union	1,093,403	45.23	42	1,152,460	46.84	33	75
HSS–IDS–HNS–HKDU–SBHS	441,390	18.26	16				16
Croatian Social Liberal Party	279,245	11.55	10	209,541	8.52	1	11
Social Democratic Party	215,839	8.93	8	39,016	1.59	1	9
Croatian Party of Rights	121,095	5.01	4	170,755	6.94	0	4
Social Democratic Union	78,282	3.24	0	41,014	1.67	0	0
Croatian Independent Democrats	72,612	3.00	0				0
Social Democratic Action	40,348	1.67	0	17,862	0.73	0	0
Croatian Party of Rights 1861	31,530	1.30	0	1,562	0.06	0	0
Croatian Christian Democratic Party	16,986	0.70	0	22,005	0.89	0	0
Croatian Party of Natural Law	7,835	0.32	0	8,444	0.34	0	0
Croatian Conservative Party	6,858	0.28	0				0
Independent Party of Rights	6,608	0.27	0	1,990	0.08	0	0
Homeland Civic Party	5,343	0.22	0	654	0.03	0	0
HSS–HSLS–HNS–HKDU–HND–IDS–SDP–HSP1861				548,250	22.28	4	4
Istrian Democratic Assembly				65,283	2.65	1	1
Croatian Peasant Party				39,158	1.59	0	0
Croatian Christian Democratic Union				16,004	0.65	0	0
Dalmatian Action				13,405	0.54	0	0
Rijeka Democratic Alliance				7,980	0.32	0	0
ASH–DA				7,685	0.31	0	0
Croatian Democratic Peasant Party				6,111	0.25	0	0
Slavonia-Baranja Croatian Party				5,644	0.23	0	0
KDM–HKDS–KNS				4,657	0.19	0	0
Croatian People's Movement – Free Croatia				4,199	0.17	0	0
Istrian Independent Party				3,843	0.16	0	0
Croatian Homeland Party				3,624	0.15	0	0
Homeland and Diaspora Community				3,256	0.13	0	0
Croatian Roma Party				3,011	0.12	0	0
Croatian Party				2,765	0.11	0	0
Croatian Liberation Movement–Croatian Party				340	0.01	0	0
Independents				59,729	2.43	0	0
National minorities							7
Total	2,417,374	100.00	80	2,460,247	100.00	40	127
Valid votes	2,417,374	96.69		2,460,247	96.99		
Invalid/blank votes	82,666	3.31		76,477	3.01		
Total votes	2,500,040	100.00		2,536,724	100.00		
Registered voters/turnout	3,634,233	68.79		3,914,000	64.81		
Source: CEC

== Subsequent changes ==
The following changes happened after elections:

- The Croatian Pure Party of Rights gained one member of parliament
- The Croatian Christian Democratic Union gained one more member of parliament
- The Serb People's Party lost one member of parliament
- The Independent Democratic Serb Party gained one member of parliament
- The Liberal Party gained four members of parliament
- The Istrian Democratic Forum gained one member of parliament
- The Croatian Independent Democrats lost one member of parliament
- Social Democratic Action of Croatia lost one member of parliament
