= List of members of the Sabor, 1992–1995 =

The second Sabor was constituted on 7 September 1992 with mandates divided to 138 representatives after the 2 August 1992 elections.

== Parliamentary officials ==
The presidents of the parliament (often also called the speaker in English) were Stjepan Mesić (HDZ) from 7 September 1992 to 24 May 1994 and Nedjeljko Mihanović (HDZ) from 24 May 1994 to 28 November 1995.

== Representatives in the second assembly ==
- Nedjeljko Mihanović
- Goran Granić
- Žarko Domljan
- Vladimir Šeks
- Milan Đukić
- Ljubomir Antić
- Mato Arlović
- Luka Bebić
- Vladimir Bebić
- Ivan Bedeničić
- Barbara Bešenić
- Borislav Bešlić
- Snježana Biga-Friganović
- Srećko Bijelić
- Vicencije Biuk
- Petar Bosnić
- Dalibor Brozović
- Dražen Budiša
- Nikola Bulat
- Željko Bušić
- Boris Buzančić
- Juraj Buzolić
- Slavko Canjuga
- Vladimir Cvitanović
- Savka Dabčević-Kučar
- Dino Debeljuh
- Slavko Degoricija
- Tomislav Pavao Duka
- Anto Đapić
- Šime Đodan
- Jakob Eltz
- Ferenc Farago
- Goranko Fižulić
- Katarina Fuček
- Anđelko Gabrić
- Krešimir Glavina
- Marino Golob
- Vladimir Gotovac
- Franjo Gregurić
- Ivan Herak
- Stjepan Herceg
- Vilim Herman
- Dragan Hinić
- Želimir Hitrec
- Ivan Hodalić
- Ivan Hranjec
- Ivan Jakovčić
- Bolta Jalšovec
- Tomo Jelić
- Rade Jovičić
- Marijan Jurić
- Perica Jurić
- Zvonimir Jurić
- Živko Juzbašić
- Boris Kandare
- Ante Karić
- Martin Katičić
- Miroslav Kiš
- Ante Klarić
- Ivan Kolak
- Milan Kovač
- Anton Kovačev
- Božo Kovačević
- Ivan Kovačić
- Zlatko Kramarić
- Petar Kriste
- Drago Krpina
- Milivoj Kujundžić
- Ante Kutle
- Marko Kvesić
- Anto Lovrić
- Mira Ljubić-Lorger
- Mirko Mađor
- Marcel Majsec
- Elio Martinčić
- Zdenko Matešić
- Nediljko Matić
- Ivan Matija
- Joso Medved
- Ivan Mesić
- Stjepan Mesić
- Adam Meštrović
- Slavko Meštrović
- Ivan Milas
- Marin Mileta
- Milanka Opačić
- Josip Pankretić
- Dobroslav Paraga
- Branimir Pasecky
- Ivić Pašalić
- Jurica Pavelić
- Stanislav Pavić
- Darko Pavlak
- Vlatko Pavletić
- Veselin Pejnović
- Đuro Perica
- Božidar Petrač
- Miloš Petrović
- Vera Pivčević-Stanić
- Davorin Pocrnić
- Niko Popović
- Ante Prkačin
- Vice Profaca
- Ivan Rabuzin
- Ivica Račan
- Furio Radin
- Jozo Radoš
- Martin Sagner
- Vedran Sršen
- Njegovan Starek
- Milan Stojanović
- Kazimir Sviben
- Boris Šegota
- Milovan Šibl
- Ante Šimara
- Ivo Škrabalo
- Tomislav Šutalo
- Mirko Tankosić
- Boris Tepšić
- Velimir Terzić
- Branko Tinodi
- Ivan Tolj
- Nedeljko Tomić
- Jozo Topić
- Miko Tripalo
- Gordana Turić
- Mladen Vedriš
- Mladen Vilfan
- Antun Vrdoljak
- Ivan Vrkić
- Dario Vukić
- Vice Vukojević
- Josip Vusić
- Franjo Zenko
- Muhamed Zulić
- Ratko Žabčić
- Ante Žarkov

== Sources ==
- "Službeni rezultati za izbor zastupnika u Zastupnički dom Sabora Republike Hrvatske sa državnih listi" (PDF) (in Croatian). Electoral Commission of the Republic of Croatia. 10 August 1992. Archived from the original (PDF) on 1 April 2012.
