= Democratic Alliance of Serbs =

Democratic Alliance of Serbs Demokratski savez Srba Демократски савез Срба
- President: Srđan Milaković
- Founded: 27 June 2016
- Split from: SDSS
- Headquarters: Zagreb, Croatia
- Ideology: Serb minority politics
- Political position: Centre-left to left-wing
- Colours: Official
- Sabor: 0 / 151
- European Parliament: 0 / 12

Website
- www.demokratskisavezsrba.hr

The Democratic Alliance of Serbs (Croatian: Demokratski savez Srba or DSS, Serbian Cyrillic: Демократски савез Срба, ДСС) is a social democratic political party of Serbs in Croatia.

== History ==
The party was founded on 27 June 2016 in Zagreb. Jovica Radmanović was elected the first President of the party while Srđan Milaković, also serving as Deputy Mayor of Vukovar at the time, was elected Deputy President.

== Electoral results ==
While failing to gain a seat in the Croatian parliament in the 2016 parliamentary elections, the party was more successful in the 2017 local elections. In the 2017 local elections, Srđan Milaković retained the position of Deputy of Mayor of Vukovar, a position reserved for a member of the Serb ethnic minority. On county level, candidates of Democratic Alliance of Serbs won the position of deputy county prefect, a position reserved for members of the Serb ethnic minority, in two counties: Dušan Bjelajac in Sisak-Moslavina, the second most populous county for ethnic Serb minority, and Miroslav Grozdanić in Požega-Slavonia County.

== See also ==
- Politics of Croatia
- Serbs of Croatia
