= Boris Milošević =

Croatian politician

- Борис Милошевић
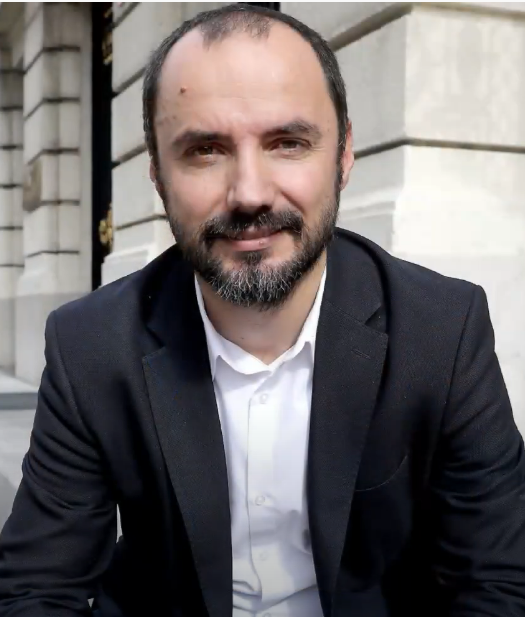
- Milošević in 2020

Deputy Prime Minister of Croatia Minister without portfolio Responsibility for Social Affairs and Human and Minority Rights
- In office 23 July 2020 – 29 April 2022
- Prime Minister: Andrej Plenković
- Preceded by: Predrag Štromar
- Succeeded by: Anja Šimpraga

President of the Serb National Council
- In office 15 July 2019 – 22 July 2020
- Preceded by: Milorad Pupovac
- Succeeded by: Milorad Pupovac

Personal details
- Born: 5 November 1974 (age 51) Šibenik, SR Croatia, SFR Yugoslavia
- Party: Independent Democratic Serb Party
- Children: 1
- Education: University of Rijeka; University of Zagreb
- Occupation: Lawyer, politician

Boris Milošević (Serbian Cyrillic: Борис Милошевић, pronounced [bǒris milǒːʃeʋitɕ]; born 5 November 1974) is a Croatian Serb lawyer and politician who served as Deputy Prime Minister of Croatia between 2020 and 2022. He is a member of the Independent Democratic Serb Party (SDSS). He previously served as the president of the Serb National Council from July 2019 until July 2020.

== Early life and career ==
Milošević was born to an ethnic Serb family in 1974 in Šibenik, which at that time was a part of the SFR Yugoslavia. He graduated from the Faculty of Law, University of Rijeka, and later enrolled in postgraduate studies in public law and administration at the Faculty of Law, University of Zagreb.

During the Croatian War of Independence his father was mobilized into the Croatian Army even though he was a Serb because Šibenik was under control of Croatia, unlike a lot of Serb majority areas where the Republic of Serbian Krajina had control. Milošević's grandmother Dara Milošević was murdered in the village of Bribirske Mostine in the aftermath of the Operation Storm. Her murderer Veselko Bilić was arrested after bragging about "murdering a 'Chetnik'" and sentenced to 7.5 years in prison. He was, however, pardoned by the President of Croatia Franjo Tuđman after 3.5 years.

From 2002 to 2005 he was an intern at the Municipal Court in Benkovac. From 2005 to 2007, he worked as a legal advisor for the Spanish humanitarian organization, Movement for Peace, and from 2007 to 2008 he worked as the secretary of the municipality of Kistanje.

After moving to Zagreb, from 2008 to 2011 he worked as a legal advisor in the Serb National Council (SNV), the most influential association of the Serb community in Croatia. He was also a member of the main board of the Center for Human Rights from 2010 to 2012.

== Political career ==
=== Serb National Council ===
His serious political career began in 2012 when he became the Assistant Minister of Public Administration and Head of the Directorate for the Political System and Local (Regional) Self-Government under the minister Arsen Bauk. In the 2016 election, he was elected a Member of Parliament, and became the President of the Independent Democratic Serb Party (SDSS) Parliamentary Club. During his parliamentary career he was a member of the inter-parliamentarty friendship groups with Azerbaijan, Montenegro, Czech Republic, Greece, Ireland, Italy, China, Russia, Serbia and the United Kingdom. He was also a member of the Parliamentary Committee for Human Rights and the Rights of National Minorities and the Parliamentary Committee for Labor, Pension System and Social Partnership.

He advocated the use of the Serbian Cyrillic alphabet, stating that "the Cyrillic alphabet symbolizes Serbs in Croatia", and that those who say that the Cyrillic alphabet is not desirable actually want to say that Serbs are the ones who are undesirable.

In July 2019, he became the president of the Serb National Council (SNV), and he came to that position after Milorad Pupovac, who led SNV for 22 years. He was elected to the Croatian Parliament following the 2020 election, in which the SDSS won all seats belonging to the Serb national minority.

=== Deputy Prime Minister ===
On 23 July 2020, Milošević was elected one of the four Deputy Prime Ministers of Croatia in charge of social affairs and human and minority rights in the new cabinet of Andrej Plenković. Due to accepting the government position he had to resign as the president of SNV. Croatian President Zoran Milanović reacted to Milošević becoming a Deputy Prime Minister by saying that he wishes to see Milošević in Knin at the celebration of the Victory Day, marking the anniversary of Operation Storm that brought an end to the Serb rebellion, and led to a large refugee crisis of Serb civilians, for which Milanović blamed the then Belgrade government. The anniversary has for a long time been a subject of dispute between Croatia and Serbia.

On 30 July, Prime Minister Plenković announced that Milošević would be participating in the celebration of the Victory Day while the Minister of Croatian Veterans Tomo Medved would be participating in the commemoration of the Grubori massacre, where six Serb civilians were killed in the aftermath of the Operation Storm. This was the first time that any political representative of Croatian Serbs attended the Victory Day celebration. Milošević's decision was mostly met with positive reactions in Croatia, including the opposition parties. Political representatives of Croats of Serbia also welcomed Milošević's decision.

However, criticism came from far-right circles, such as Croatian Defence Forces. Criticism also came from the Government of Serbia and Bosnian Serb politicians, who previously urged Croatian Serbs not to participate in the anniversary. Milorad Dodik, the Serb member of the Presidency of Bosnia and Herzegovina called Milošević's decision "unacceptable", while Aleksandar Vulin, the Minister of Defence of Serbia, said that he "could not believe that a Serb was going to celebrate the expulsion of 250,000 Serbs". President of Serbia Aleksandar Vučić later said that it was up to Serbia and Republika Srpska to say that "they did not support the presence of Serb representatives at the celebration of the Operation Storm in Knin, and that they would never stop marking the anniversaries of the 'pogrom' of Serbs from Croatia". Savo Štrbac, director of the Veritas Documentation and Information Center, said that Milošević's father was a winner over Serbs and a recognized Croatian veteran, and that the question was whether Serbs would have voted for him in the parliamentary elections if they had known. Special envoy of the President of Serbia for resolving the issue of missing persons with Croatia, Veran Matić, said that "Milošević had proved to be a very dedicated, principled and valuable advocate of the interests of Serbs in Croatia, but also the democratization of Croatia". After the Victory Day celebration, Milošević talked to the media about his reasons for coming and about Serb victims explaining it with a quote:

"Let the spiral of hatred be broken so that the horrors of war will never be repeated. All victims, regardless of nationality, should be respected. Serbs from Croatia also had their victims and that should be respected. Emotions are still fresh, and I consider my arrival a pledge for the future."

The same day, after the celebration in Knin was over, a banner was set up above the Zemun–Pančevo highway, between Borča and Padinska Skela, saying "Борисе Милошевићу, пичко ustaška" (transl. Boris Milošević, you Ustasha cunt). One day after the celebration, Milošević said that he knew that people in Serbia would not understand his decision and that he condemns all war crimes, "especially crimes committed against Croats in Lovas, Škabrnja, Nadin and all other places". Milošević said that the mass return of exiled Serbs to the territories where Operation Storm was carried out "will certainly not happen", but that the message of the government is that it will do everything to create preconditions for that.

On 18 November 2020, on the Remembrance Day of the Sacrifice of Vukovar in 1991, Milošević took part in the memorial walk through the city. The same day, he took to Facebook to express his condolences to the families affected by the Vukovar massacre.

On 3 July 2021, Milošević took part in 20th annual Zagreb Pride, alongside other politicians such as Mayor of Zagreb Tomislav Tomašević and Social Democratic Party president Peđa Grbin, earning praise from Prime Minister Plenković. On 23 July, he praised the citizens' decision to put Nikola Tesla on Croatian euro coins (as a result of a public online poll), dubbing him the "symbol that binds us (Serbs and Croats) to the whole world. The citizens of Croatia voted for a Serb from Croatia, who was proud of his people and his homeland, who always remained faithful to his culture—a typical Krajina, Prečani one—and now he is going to be on a Croatian euro coin as one of the recognizable symbols of the Republic of Croatia."

== Personal life ==
He is married and has one child, while his wife works at the Serbian Orthodox Secondary School in Zagreb.

== See also ==
- Serbs of Croatia
- Cabinet of Andrej Plenković II
