= Furio Radin =

Croatian politician

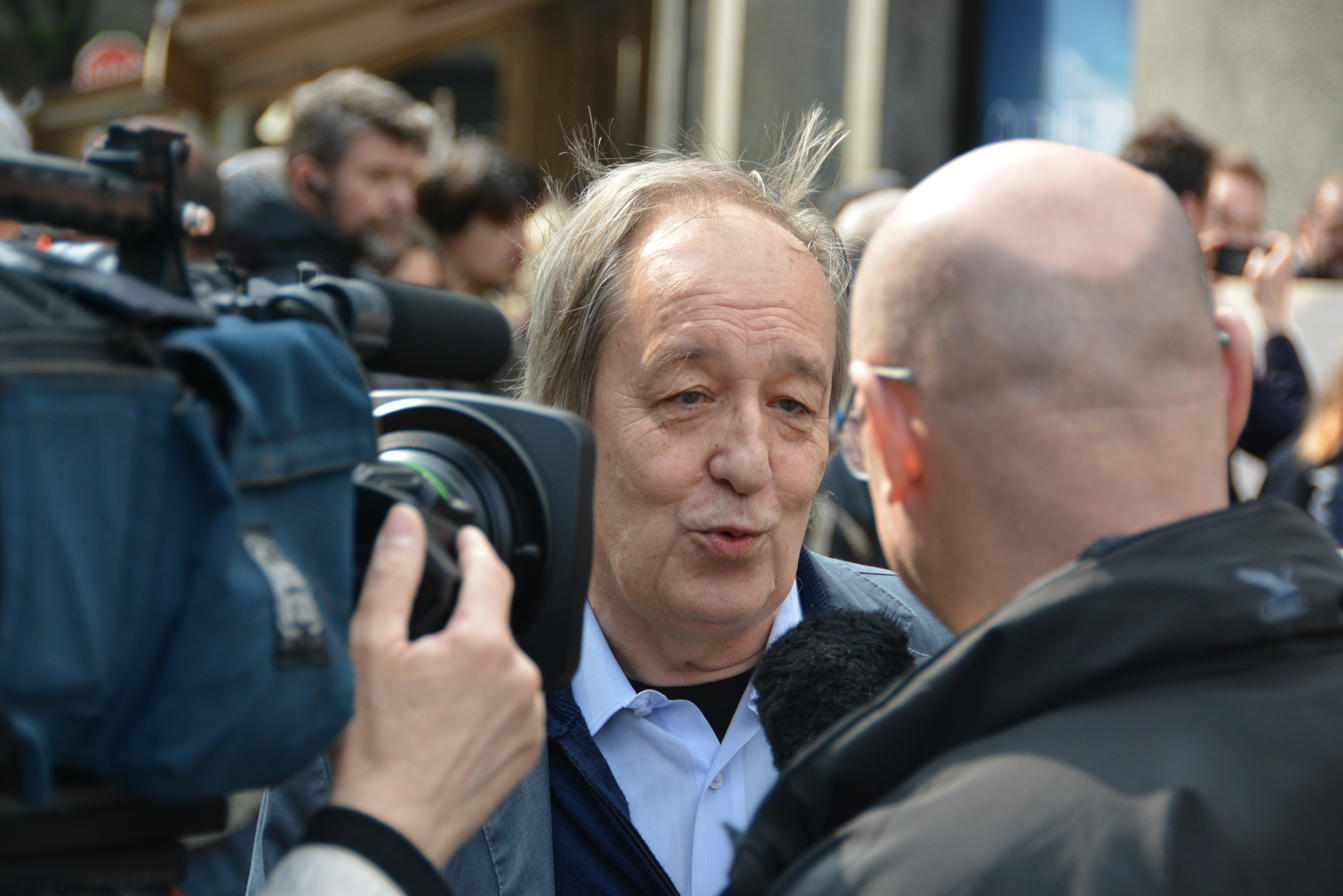
- Furio Radin in 2016

Member of the Croatian Parliament for the 12th constituency
- In office 7 September 1992 – 25 June 2026

President of the Parliament's Committee on Human Rights and Rights of National Minorities
- In office 2 February 2000 – 19 June 2017
- Preceded by: Miroslav Kiš
- Succeeded by: Milorad Pupovac

Deputy Speaker of the Croatian Parliament
- In office 9 June 2017 – 25 June 2026

Personal details
- Born: 1 June 1950 (age 76) Pula, PR Croatia, FPR Yugoslavia
- Party: Independent
- Other political affiliations: Istrian Democratic Assembly (parliamentary group)
- Spouse(s): Jasna Petrović (div.); Helena Štimac
- Children: Petra; Paola
- Relatives: Fabrizio Radin (brother)
- Education: University of Zagreb

Furio Radin (born 1 June 1950) is a Croatian politician who is currently serving as a Member of the Croatian Parliament for the Italian national minority, an office he has held since 7 September 1992. He has also been the Chair of the Parliamentary Committee on Human Rights and Rights of National Minorities since 2000, and one of the Deputy Speakers of the Parliament since 9 June 2017. Radin is the longest-serving Member of Parliament in Croatian history, with a service lasting 34 years, 26 days, as of 3 October 2026.

Radin was first elected to the parliament in the 1992 election and was re-elected to nine more terms, in the 1995, 2000, 2003, 2007, 2011, 2015, 2016, 2020 and 2024 elections respectively. Although he is formally an independent, he has closely cooperated with the liberal regionalist Istrian Democratic Assembly party, in whose parliamentary club he also sits.

== Early life and education ==
Furio Radin was born on 1 June 1950 in Pula, where he attended elementary and high school. He earned a degree in psychology from the Faculty of Humanities and Social Sciences in Zagreb and later gained a PhD in the same field of study. During his youth, he was active in the Croatian branch of the League of Communist Youth of Yugoslavia, where he was responsible for the scientific activity of young people.

== Political career ==
Radin was first elected to the Croatian Parliament in the 1992 parliamentary election, as a representative for the Italian national minority, and was reelected in the next seven elections. He did not actively campaign for the 2011 parliamentary election because he was the sole candidate. Between 1993 and 2001, he served as a councillor in the Assembly of Istria County. Since 2000, Radin has presided over Parliament's Committee on Human Rights and Rights of National Minorities, having been elected to that function six times by 2017. In 2024 he was re-elected by just 35 votes.

== Personal life ==
Radin is married to sociologist Helena Štimac who is chairwoman of the Office for Gender Equality of the Croatian Government. His wife was a member of the Croatian Social Liberal Party between 1990 and 1997, and of the Liberal Party, in which she served as a vice president, between 1997 and 2006. The couple has no children. However, Furio Radin has two daughters, Petra and Paola, from his first marriage with Jasna Petrović. His brother Fabrizio, a member of the Istrian Democratic Assembly party, is the president of the Executive Committee of the Italian Union in Croatia and he was the Prefect of Istria County, from 6 July 2019 until 2021 elections. Fabrizio was also a three-time Deputy Mayor of Pula and the Deputy Prefect of Istria County, from 2017 until 2019.
