= 1992 Croatian parliamentary election =

- 2 August 1992
- All 138 seats in the Chamber of Representatives; 69 seats needed for a majority
- Turnout: 75.61%
Party	Leader	Vote %	Seats
HDZ	Franjo Tuđman	44.71	85
HSLS	Dražen Budiša	17.72	14
HSP	Dobroslav Paraga	7.07	5
HNS	Savka Dabčević-Kučar	6.70	6
SDP	Ivica Račan	5.53	11
HSS	Drago Stipac	4.25	3
DA–IDS–RiDS	Ivan Jakovčić (IDS)	3.18	6
SNS	Milan Đukić	1.09	3
Independents	–	–	5
This lists parties that won seats. See the complete results below.
Prime Minister before	Prime Minister after
Franjo Gregurić; HDZ	Hrvoje Šarinić; HDZ

Parliamentary elections were held in Croatia on 2 August 1992, alongside presidential elections. They were the first elections after independence and under the new constitution. All 138 seats in the Chamber of Representatives were up for election. The result was a victory for the Croatian Democratic Union, which won an absolute majority of 85 seats. Voter turnout was 76%.

== Background ==
The circumstances under which the elections took place were extraordinary - one third of the country was occupied by Krajina forces, while Croatia itself was involved in war raging in neighbouring Bosnia and Herzegovina. Few people, however, doubted their legitimacy because the old Parliament, elected under the old Communist Constitution and in a time when Croatia had been part of Yugoslavia, clearly didn't correspond to the new political realities.

Although the new Constitution called for two houses of Parliament, only one - House of Representatives - was elected.

New electoral laws, written by Smiljko Sokol, were passed and a new voting system - combination of first past the post and proportional representation was introduced. 60 members were to be elected in individual constituencies while 60 seats were to be distributed among those candidates' lists who broke 2% threshold. 12 seats were reserved for expatriate Croatians, while the Parliament had to have at least 15 members belonging to ethnic minorities - 11 Serbs and 4 others.

Franjo Tudjman and his Croatian Democratic Union party entered the campaign with great confidence, because Croatia, despite being partially occupied, had won independence and international recognition under his leadership. State-controlled media at the time presented the war as practically won and peaceful reintegration of Krajina a mere formality that would occur in very foreseeable future.

However, the very same period saw the emergence of opposition to Tudjman's regime, centred mostly around politicians and parties who criticised Tudjman's conduct of war and found the government to be too appeasing towards the international community and the Serbs. Other opposition leaders were troubled by Tudjman's autocratic tendencies and visible decline of democratic standards in Croatia.

The Social Democratic Party of Croatia, which was nominally the main opposition party, based on its representation in the old Parliament, was in comparison somehow friendly towards Tudjman. This could be explained with its precarious position - it lost most of its membership to defections, many of its disgruntled voters defected to other parties, while many Croatians associated that party with Communism. Many analysts and opinion polls believed SDP would fail to break the 2% threshold.

The opposition was very vocal, but it was also disunited - which was most evident in the rivalry between two liberal parties - Croatian Social Liberal Party and Croatian People's Party.

== Conduct ==
This election, together with the presidential election, was also associated with alleged vote fraud. After the elections, some opposition candidates accused the ruling party of stealing the votes and rigging the result in favour of their candidates, especially in constituencies where the election was close. The best known of such accusations related to one Zagreb constituency where the HDZ candidate and future Sabor speaker Nedjeljko Mihanović won the seat and defeated the HSLS candidate Relja Bašić only after receiving couple of hundred votes allegedly cast in Croatian prisons.

== Results ==
The splits in the opposition allowed the HDZ to win constituencies deemed hopeless by the split opposition, sometimes with barely 18% of the vote. HDZ won around 40% of the vote on the national level, but it also won 54 out of 60 individual constituencies. The only places where HDZ was soundly beaten was Istria, where the local Istrian Democratic Assembly won all three constituencies. One seat in Rijeka was claimed by Vladimir Bebić of the Alliance of Primorje - Gorski Kotar, while another, representing then-occupied Vukovar, was won by an independent candidate, and one in Medjimurje won by HSLS.

Although HDZ won a comfortable majority, the opposition could comfort themselves with the emergence of HSLS as the strongest opposition party. Other parties to enter Sabor were HNS, Croatian Peasant Party, Croatian Party of Rights, Dalmatian Action, SDP and Serb Popular Party.

The latter had their representative in Parliament elected by the decision of Constitutional Court, in order to fill quota of ethnic Serbs. This decision was controversial, because the Court explained its decision by branding SNS as an "ethnic party" and, therefore, more entitled to represent the Serb ethnic minority than any other party. This was at the expense of the left-wing Social Democratic Union party, which won more votes than SNS and had more than enough ethnic Serb candidates on its list to fill the quota.

Party	Proportional			Constituency			Seats	
Party	Votes	%	Seats	Votes	%	Seats	Minority	Total
Croatian Democratic Union	1,176,437	44.71	31			54	0	85
Croatian Social Liberal Party	466,356	17.72	12			1	1	14
Croatian Party of Rights	186,000	7.07	5			0	0	5
Croatian People's Party	176,214	6.70	4			0	2	6
Social Democratic Party	145,419	5.53	3			0	8	11
Croatian Peasant Party	111,869	4.25	3			0	0	3
DA–IDS–RiDS (Note: Within the coalition, Dalmatian Action and the Rijeka Democratic Union won one seat each, whilst the Istrian Democratic Assembly won four.)	83,623	3.18	2			4	0	6
Croatian Democratic Party	72,303	2.75	0			0	0	0
Croatian Christian Democratic Party	70,715	2.69	0			0	0	0
Social Democratic Union	32,475	1.23	0			0	0	0
Socialist Party of Croatia	31,575	1.20	0			0	0	0
Serb People's Party	28,620	1.09	0			0	3	3
Social Democratic Party of Croatia	15,798	0.60	0			0	0	0
Christian People's Party	11,930	0.45	0			0	0	0
Croatian Republican Party	7,683	0.29	0			0	0	0
Croatian Party of Natural Law	7,611	0.29	0			0	0	0
Croatian State-Building Movement	6,907	0.26	0			0	0	0
Independents						1	4	5
Total	2,631,535	100.00	60			60	18	138
Valid votes	2,631,535	97.79						
Invalid/blank votes	59,338	2.21						
Total votes	2,690,873	100.00						
Registered voters/turnout	3,558,913	75.61						
Source: CEC

== See also ==
- Members of the 2nd Sabor

== Sources ==
- Ilišin, Vlasta (September 1999). "Strukturna dinamika hrvatskog parlamenta" [Structural dynamics of the Croatian Parliament]. Politička misao: Croatian Political Science Review (in Croatian). 36 (3). Faculty of Political Science, University of Zagreb: 151–174. ISSN 0032-3241.
- "Broj i postotak stranačkih zastupnika u Hrvatskome saboru od 1992. do 2001. godine". Parlamentarne stranke (in Croatian). Croatian Information-Documentation Referral Agency. Archived from the original on July 22, 2011.
