= Vojislav Stanimirović (politician) =

Croatian politician

- Војислав Станимировић
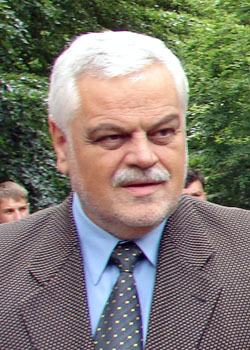
- Stanimirović in 2010

Member of the Croatian Parliament
- In office 22 December 2011 – 28 December 2015
- Prime Minister: Zoran Milanović
- Constituency: Electoral district XII
- In office 22 December 2003 – 11 January 2008
- Prime Minister: Ivo Sanader
- Constituency: Electoral district XII

Minister without portfolio for the RSK
- In office 27 July 1995 – 5 August 1995
- Preceded by: Office established
- Succeeded by: Office abolished

2nd Chairman of the Executive Council of the Eastern Slavonia, Baranja and Western Syrmia
- In office 23 April 1996 – 29 May 1997
- Preceded by: Borislav Držajić
- Succeeded by: Office abolished

1st President of the Independent Democratic Serb Party
- In office March 1997 – 2 July 2017
- Preceded by: Office established
- Succeeded by: Milorad Pupovac

Personal details
- Born: 19 August 1953 (age 73) Tovarnik, PR Croatia, FPR Yugoslavia
- Spouse: Ljeposava Stanimirović
- Education: University of Belgrade
- Occupation: Politician
- Profession: Psychiatrist
- Awards: Order for Special Merits in Podunavlje

Military service
- Allegiance: Yugoslavia
- Branch/service: Yugoslav People's Army
- Years of service: 1991–1992
- Unit: Medical Service
- Commands: Medical Service
- Battles/wars: Battle of Vukovar

Vojislav Stanimirović (Serbian Cyrillic: Војислав Станимировић; born 19 August 1953) is a Croatian Serb politician as well as the founder and former president of the Independent Democratic Serb Party. During his political career he held various functions both in Croatian and self-proclaimed Republic of Serbian Krajina institutions and political organizations. He was elected member of Croatian Parliament, president of the Independent Democratic Serb Party, 2nd Chairman of the Government of Eastern Slavonia, Baranja and Western Syrmia and minister without portfolio in the last Cabinet of Milan Babić of the Government of the RSK.

Over the years Stanimirović's political positions evolved from that of hawkish Serbian Radical supporter of unification of the Republic of Serbian Krajina and Republika Srpska before Operation Storm and prominent critic of more conciliatory and FR Yugoslavia aligned local authorities in Eastern Slavonia, to the main proponent of moderation and compromise after the initiation of the UNTAES mission in the region in which he was more willing to compromise than his former opponents. With this transformation Stanimirović became one of the most prominent post-war Serb political representatives in Croatia.

== Biography ==
Stanimirović was born in Tovarnik near Vukovar. He graduated from the Faculty of Medicine at the University of Belgrade.

During the 1991 Battle of Vukovar, Stanimirović was a reserve officer who led the medical corps of the Yugoslav People's Army. In 1992 the Yugoslav army named him director of the Vukovar Hospital and in 1993 he became a politician. Stanimirović served as mayor of Vukovar during the time when this town was under Serbian occupation.

In his 1993 article in a local newspaper "Vojska Krajine", the Vukovar Hospital was described as "the last Ustaše fort". Because of the related Ovčara massacre, the statement was met with outrage in Croatian media when it was published in the runup to the 2003 Croatian parliamentary election. Stanimirović said this claim had been edited into his article.

In 1995, Stanimirović was decorated with Order for Special Merits in Podunavlje by the former president of Republika Srpska, Radovan Karadžić in Banja Luka.

He served as member of the Croatian Parliament from 22 December 2003 until 11 January 2008. He was also elected in the 2007 Croatian parliamentary election, but served only until October 2008 when his deputy replaced him.
