= Milorad Pupovac =

Croatian politician and linguist

- Милорад Пуповац
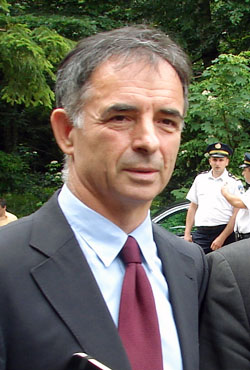
- Pupovac in 2010

Member of the Croatian Parliament for the 12th constituency
- Incumbent
- Assumed office 22 October 2003
- Prime Minister: Ivica Račan; Ivo Sanader; Jadranka Kosor; Zoran Milanović; Tihomir Orešković; Andrej Plenković
- In office 28 October 1995 – 2 February 2000
- Prime Minister: Zlatko Mateša

2nd President of the Independent Democratic Serb Party
- Incumbent
- Assumed office 2 July 2017
- Preceded by: Vojislav Stanimirović

Personal details
- Born: 5 November 1955 (age 71) Benkovac, PR Croatia, FPR Yugoslavia
- Party: Association for Yugoslav Democratic Initiative (1988); Social Democratic Union of Croatia / Yugoslavia (1990); Social Democratic Action of Croatia (1994–1996); Independent Democratic Serb Party (1997–present)
- Spouse: Slavica Lukić
- Children: 2
- Parents: Obrad Pupovac; Manda Pupovac
- Relatives: Vesna Pisarović (daughter-in-law)
- Education: PhD of University of Zagreb (1988)
- Profession: Linguist

Milorad Pupovac (Serbian Cyrillic: Милорад Пуповац; born 5 November 1955) is a Croatian politician and linguist. He is a member of the Sabor, the former president of the Serb National Council, and the president of the Independent Democratic Serb Party. He was also an observer at the European Parliament.

== Education ==
Pupovac was born in Donje Ceranje near Benkovac. He graduated from the Faculty of Humanities and Social Sciences at the University of Zagreb. He holds a PhD in linguistics and is a professor at the University of Zagreb. His notable books include 1986 Lingvistika i ideologija (Linguistics and Ideology), 1990 Jezik i djelovanje (Language and Action) and 1990 Politička komunikacija (Politics and Communication).

== Political activity ==
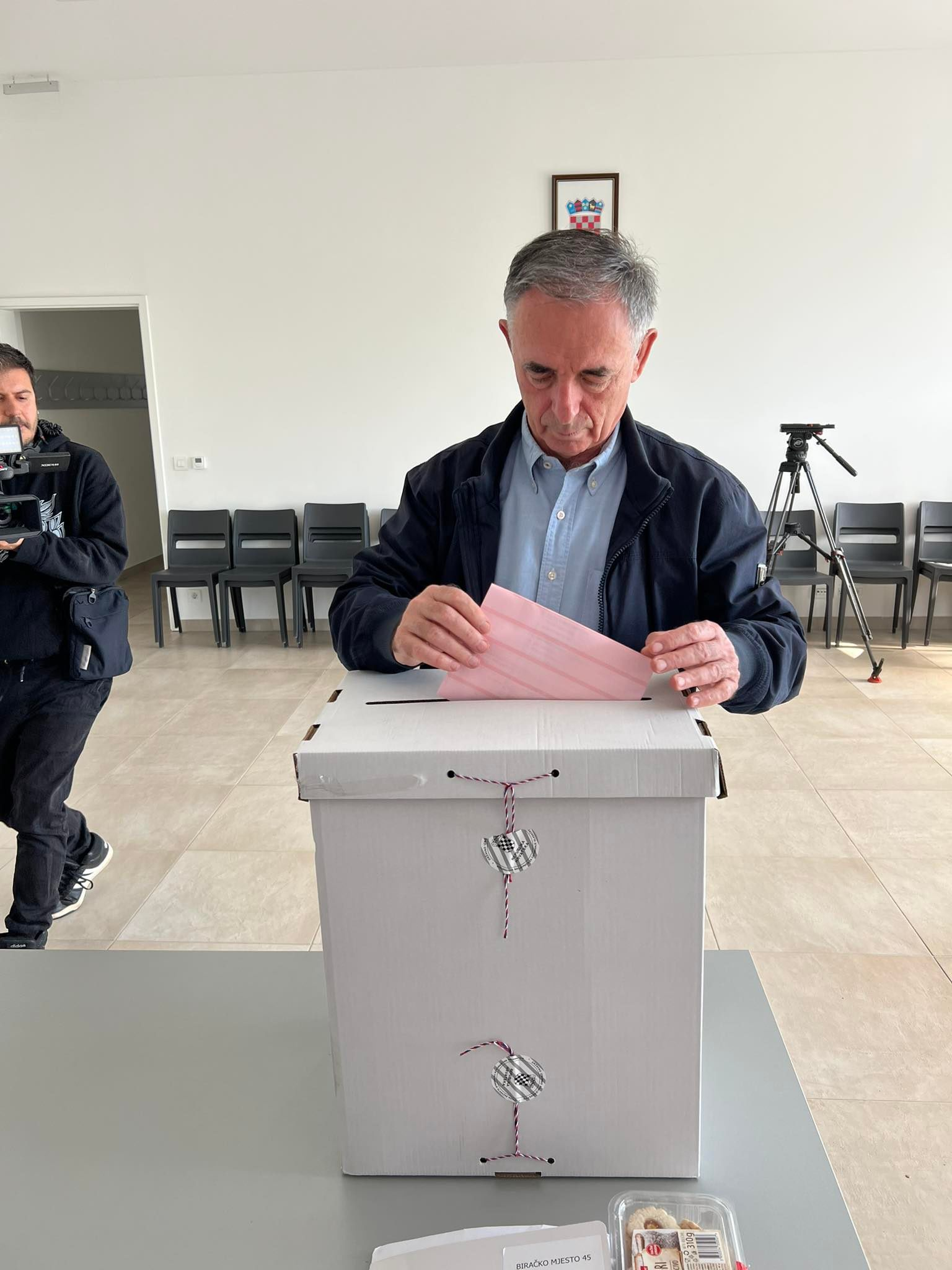
Milorad Pupovac at the 2023 Croatian national minorities councils and representatives elections, Zagreb

He was one of the leading members of the Association for Yugoslav Democratic Initiative, and after that he was the leader of the League of Social Democrats and head of the Social Democrat Alliance of Croatia – Social Democrat Alliance of Yugoslavia. He was the founder of the Serb Democratic Forum and its first president until 1995.

At the beginning of 1995, he participated in the founding of the Independent Serb Party and of the Action of Social Democrats of Croatia. He was involved in the activity of that party and as their representative, he entered the Sabor after elections held in 1995. He cast the decisive vote needed to achieve the two-thirds majority necessary to amend the Croatian Constitution on 12 December 1997. It was the first amending of the Constitution since its adoption on 22 December 1990, and the major amendments included the investiture of the Croatian War of Independence into the Constitution's text, as well as the adoption of articles prohibiting the beginning of negotiations on Croatia's entrance into associations with any former Yugoslav republics and articles defining the national minorities of Croatia. After that, he founded the Independent Democratic Serb Party, led by Vojislav Stanimirović who was the mayor of Vukovar during the Croatian War of Independence. On the list of that party, he was a candidate for the Croatian Parliament several times. He succeeded Stanimirović as the president of the party in July 2017.
