= Bosniak Democratic Party of Croatia =

The Bosnian Democratic Party of Croatia (Croatian: Bošnjačka demokratska stranka Hrvatske, BDSH) is a left wing Croatian political party representing the Bosniak minority. Its president Nedžad Hodžić won the special seat of the Bosniak and other minorities in the Croatian parliamentary election, 2011.
