= Independent Democratic Serb Party =

Croatian political party

Independent Democratic Serb Party Samostalna demokratska srpska stranka Самостална демократска српска странка
- Abbreviation: SDSS
- President: Milorad Pupovac
- General Secretary: Danko Nikolić
- Vice-presidents: Dragan Crnogorac; Mirjana Galo; Mile Horvat; Ognjen Vukmirović
- Founder: Vojislav Stanimirović
- Founded: 5 March 1997
- Headquarters: Trg drvena pijaca 28, Vukovar
- Membership (2022): 10,324
- Ideology: Serb minority politics Social democracy Social liberalism Pro-Europeanism
- Political position: Centre-left
- National affiliation: Kukuriku Coalition (2014–2015)
- European Parliament group: Progressive Alliance of Socialists and Democrats
- Colors: Red; Blue
- Sabor: 3 / 151
- European Parliament: 0 / 12

Website
- sdss.hr

The Independent Democratic Serb Party (Serbo-Croatian: Самостална демократска српска странка, Samostalna demokratska srpska stranka, SDSS) is a social-democratic political party in Croatia representing the interests of the Croatian Serbs. It holds progressive, pro-European stances and is generally considered a centre-left party.

== History ==
It was formed in 1997 and led by Vojislav Stanimirović. In the 2003 Croatian parliamentary election, it beat its main rival, the Serb People's Party (SNS), taking all three seats reserved for Serb representatives in the Croatian parliament.

After the elections, the Independent Democratic Serb Party made an agreement with the winning Croatian Democratic Union led by Ivo Sanader in which they agreed on fulfilling several Independent Democratic Serb Party demands such as refugee return, strengthening of national equality, judicial reform and cooperation with neighbouring countries. In the 2007 Croatian parliamentary election, they retained their three seats in the Parliament of Croatia.

In the Cabinet of Ivo Sanader II, their member Slobodan Uzelac received the position of vice-president of government. In the 2011 Croatian parliamentary election, they again won all three seats for Serb minority lists in the Parliament.

In the 2015 and 2016 Croatian parliamentary elections, the SDSS also held all of 3 Serb national minority seats in the Croatian Parliament, continuing to support the HDZ-led government of Croatia.

The party participated in 2019 European Parliament election in Croatia, winning 2.66% of votes. After the 2020 parliamentary election, SDSS member Boris Milošević received the position of Deputy Prime Minister of Croatia, in charge of social affairs and human and minority rights, within the Second Cabinet of Andrej Plenković, representing national minorities in Croatia.

== Electoral performances ==
=== Croatian Parliament ===
Croatian Parliament
Year	Number of votes	% in District XII (Serb seats)	Overall seats won	District XII	District XII (Serb seats)	Government
2003	67,075	57.66%	3 / 151	3 / 8	3 / 3	government support
2007	38,271	62.56%	3 / 151	3 / 8	3 / 3	government
2011	40,978	73.36%	3 / 151	3 / 8	3 / 3	government support
2015	35,203	77.63%	3 / 151	3 / 8	3 / 3	opposition
2016	39,820	83.55%	3 / 151	3 / 8	3 / 3	government support
2020	26,824	85.95%	3 / 151	3 / 8	3 / 3	government
2024	32,846	89.0%	3 / 151	3 / 8	3 / 3	opposition

=== Zagreb City Assembly ===
Year	Popular vote (coalition)	% of popular vote	Overall seats won	Seat change	Coalition	Government
2017	67,189	20.78%	0 / 151	▲1		Opposition
2021	130,850	40.83%	1 / 151	▲2	Green–Left	Government

=== European Parliament ===
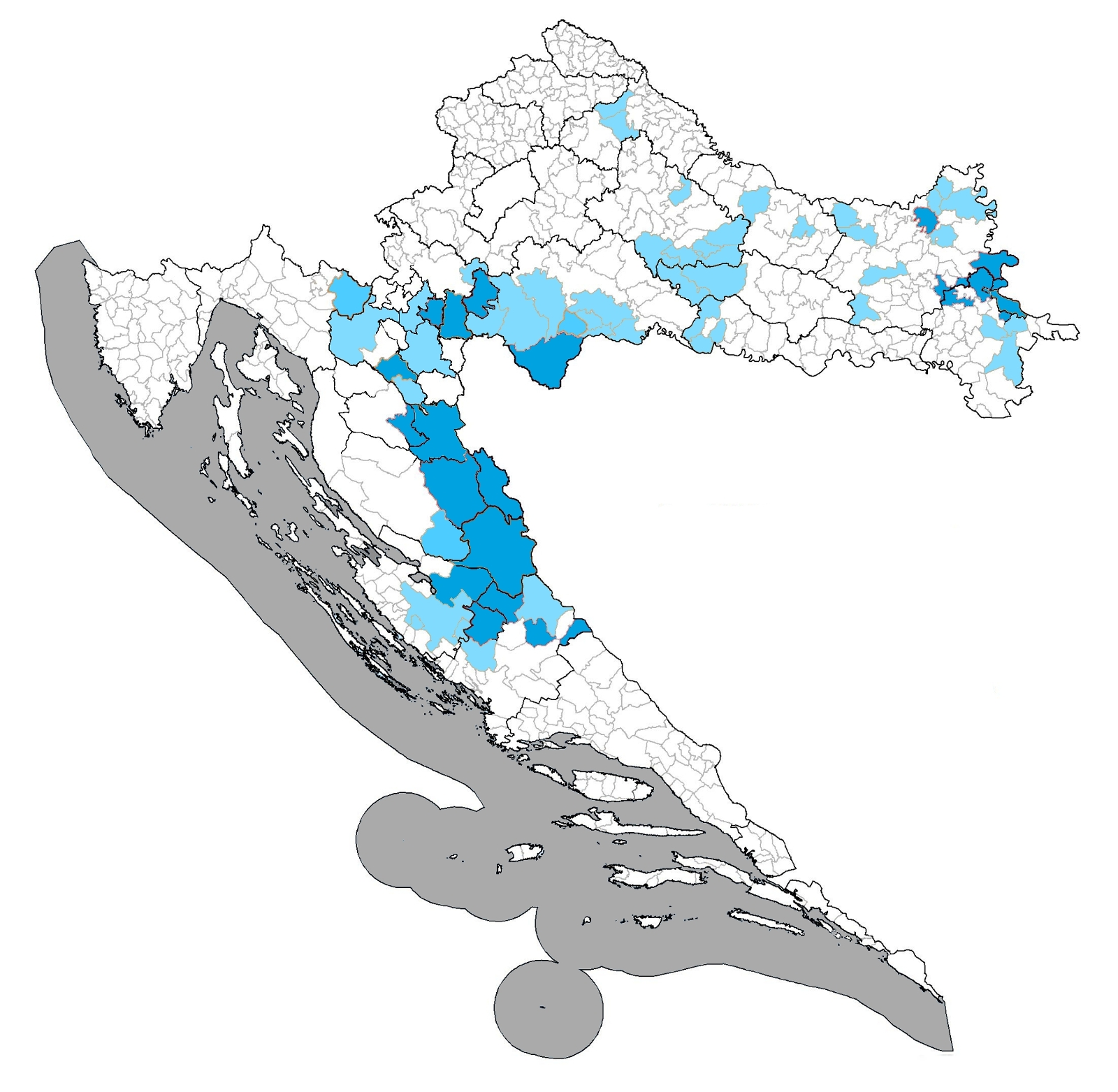
SDSS results in the 2019 European Parliament election in Croatia by municipality. Saturation of colour denotes strength of vote.

For the 2014 European Parliament election in Croatia, the Independent Democratic Serb Party joined the centre-left SDP-led Kukuriku coalition. The coalition eventually won 4 out of 11 Croatian seats in European Parliament, with SDSS received no seat.

In 2019, the Independent Democratic Serb Party ran independently for the first time in a European Parliament election. Although there were speculations that the SDSS might leave the ruling coalition with HDZ, its leader Milorad Pupovac confirmed that the SDSS would remain a part it, following a meeting with Prime Minister Andrej Plenković. Campaign was marked by SDSS jumbo posters with inscription "Do you know what it is like to be a Serb in Croatia?" in which a word Serb was written in Serbian Cyrillic: "Znate li kako je biti Србин u Hrvatskoj?". University of Zagreb professor Dejan Jović was second on the list, just behind party leader Milorad Pupovac. As it was expected by campaign leaders, the jumbo posters were target of widespread Croatian nationalism vandalism and destruction, which underlined the ethnic intolerance and discrimination issues of anti-Serb sentiment in Croatia.

== Party presidents ==
No.	Name (Born–Died)	Portrait	Term of Office	
1	Vojislav Stanimirović (b. 1953)		5 March 1997	2 July 2017
2	Milorad Pupovac (b. 1955)		2 July 2017	Incumbent

== Party platform ==
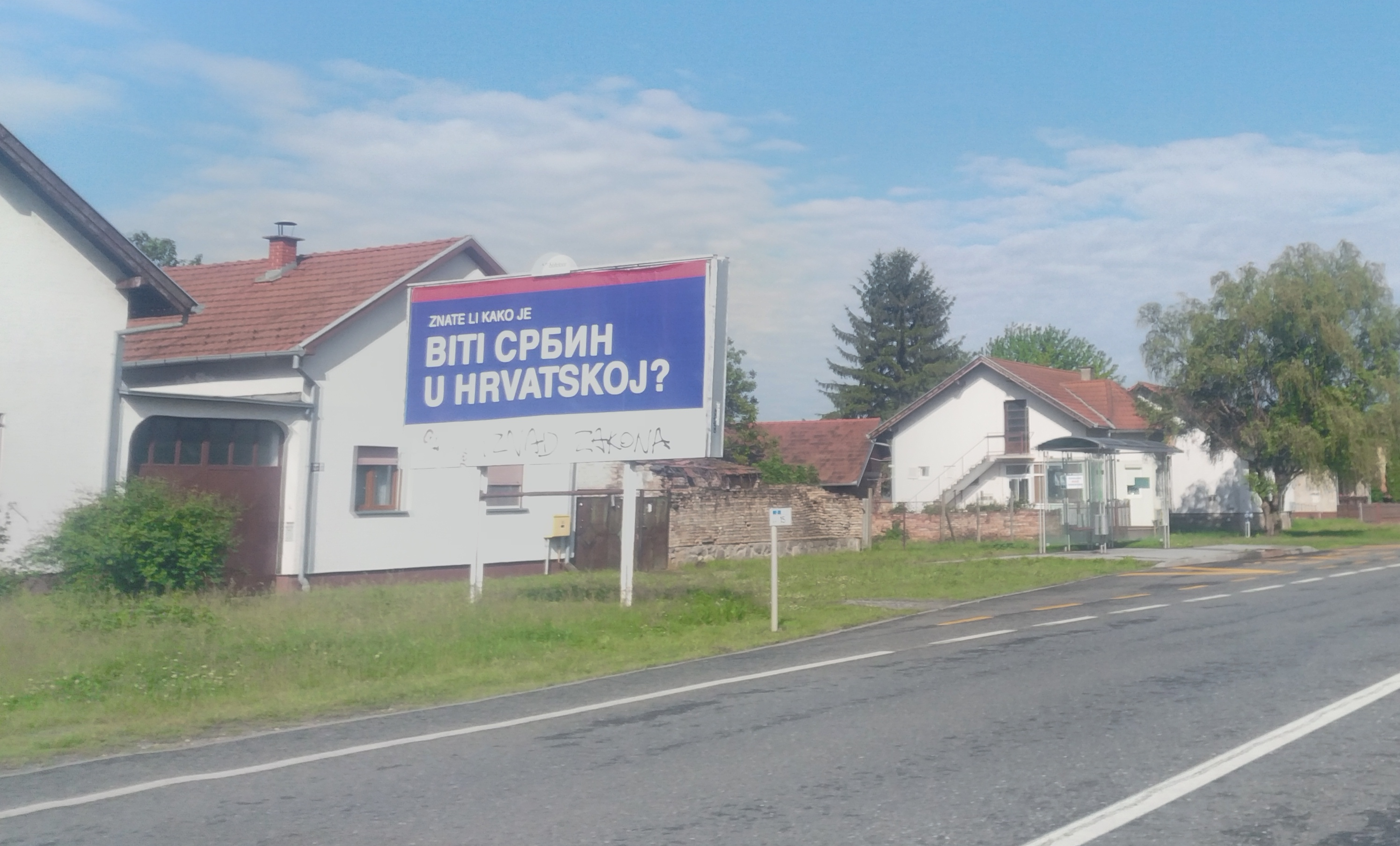
SDSS 2019 European Parliament election campaign jumbo poster in Vukovar, with inscription "Do you know how it is to be a Serb in Croatia?", with added Croatian nationalist graffiti stating "To be above the law".

The SDSS defines itself as a democratic party of liberal and social-democratic orientation but also as a Serb national party. Political goals include:

1. Refugee return, especially of Serbs, which its represent in parliament; finishing renewal of war damaged areas
2. The right to buy earlier state-owned flats, under earlier legislation (before peaceful reintegration of Croatian Podunavlje, when deadline for buying state-owned flats ended)
3. State protection and securing of existing rights of national minorities, especially Serbs in Croatia
4. Cultural and educational autonomy of Serbs in Croatia, through use of Serbian language and writings, use of Serbian national symbols, education in Serbian, foundation of Serb organizations in education and culture, foundation of Serbian information media and the maintaining of Serbian traditions and customs
5. Professionalization of the armed forces
6. Regionalism and decentralization
7. Croatian integration into the EU and developing relations with Serbia

== See also ==
- Novi Plamen, some of the party leaders are members of its Advisory Board
- Novosti, weekly magazine published by the Serb National Council (SNV)
- Serb Independent Party
- Independent Democratic Party (Yugoslavia)
