= Milan Đukić (politician, born 1947) =

Croatian politician

Milan Đukić (Serbian Cyrillic: Милан Ђукић; 10 April 1947, in Donji Lapac – 8 October 2007, in Donji Lapac) was a Croatian Serb politician. He was the leader of the Serb People's Party, and a former Deputy Speaker of the Croatian Parliament.

== Biography ==
Đukić lead the Serb People's Party from the 1990s until his death in 2007. His party represented ethnic Serbs in Croatia who did not join a separatist rebellion against Croatia's independence movement from the former Yugoslavia.

Đukić was the subject of heavy criticism from both Croats and Serbs within Croatia. Croats disliked him because he criticized the government's treatment of ethnic Serbs, who are the country's largest minority group. Ethnic Serbs at times disliked Đukić because he was seen as part of Croatia's political establishment.

Đukić served as a lawmaker and Member of Parliament from 1992 until 2003. He served as Deputy Speaker of the Parliament from 1992 until 1996. His influence in government gradually diminished as other ethnic Serbs attracted votes and attention from Croatia's minority communities.

Đukić died in his home village of Donji Lapac, which is located in Central Croatia, on 8 October 2007. He was 61 and was survived by his wife, Dara, and their two children.
