= Serb People's Party (Croatia) =

Serb People's Party Srpska narodna stranka Српска народна странка
- President: Zoran Kojić
- Vice-president: Radmila Medaković
- Founder: Milan Đukić
- Founded: 18 May 1991
- Dissolved: Before 2016
- Ideology: Serb minority politics Anti-fascism; Pro-Europeanism
- Political position: Centre-left
- Colours: Blue, red and white
- Sabor: 0 / 151

Serb People's Party (Serbo-Croatian: Srpska narodna stranka / Српска народна странка) was one of the political parties that represented the ethnic Serb minority in Croatia.

== History ==
=== 1990s ===
The party was founded in early 1991 by ethnic Serb politicians opposed to the radical and secessionist policies of Republic of Serbian Krajina. As the conflict in Croatia escalated, SNS quickly found itself in a precarious position. Its base was limited to the territories under Croatian government control, where ethnic Serbs were increasingly subjected to a variety of abuses, often under tacit or open support by authorities. The SNS, on the other hand, never criticised the government of Franjo Tuđman. In return, the state-controlled media described the SNS as the only legitimate representative of Croatian Serbs and its leader Milan Đukić was appointed to many important government posts, including assistant minister of interiors, vice-speaker of Sabor and presidential advisor.

In the mid-1990s, the SNS gradually began to distance itself from Tuđman's government and became more vocal in representing the interests of ethnic Serbs. This became evident after Operation Storm, during which the home of Milan Đukić in Donji Lapac was torched by Croatian military and police units. Following the Erdut Agreement that reintegrated eastern Slavonia into Croatia in 1997/1998, Tuđman found more suitable and more legitimate partners in ethnic Serb politicians from eastern Slavonia that would join the newly formed Independent Democratic Serb Party.

=== 2000s ===
The rivalry between the SNS and SDSS gradually manifested itself on the former Krajina territories where those two parties fought for the votes of Serb refugees who returned to Croatia. Although the SNS had the upper hand at first and came into position to form the first Serb-dominated local government in Donji Lapac, SDSS proved not only as better organised, but also more acceptable for Croatian political mainstream. In the 2003 parliamentary elections, SNS failed to enter Croatian Parliament and lost all three Serb seats to the SDSS.

With the death of Milan Đukić, the party chose Milan Rodić to succeed as President in 2007.

=== 2010s ===
The party established the Serb Solidarity coalition with several minor parties as an alternative to the politics of Independent Democratic Serb Party. In 2013, Zoran Kojić succeeded as the party president.
