= Zagreb attack =

Zagreb attack may refer to:

- Sabotage at the General Post Office in Zagreb, in 1941
- Bombing of Zagreb in World War II, in 1944 & 1945
- Bombing of Banski dvori, in October 1991
- Murder of the Zec family, in December 1991
- Zagreb rocket attacks, in 1995
- Assassination of Ivo Pukanić, in 2008
- Kajzerica shooting, in 2019
- 2020 Zagreb shooting
