= President of Croatia =

Head of state

President of the Republic of Croatia
- Predsjednik Republike Hrvatske
- Coat of arms of the president

- Standard of the president

- Incumbent; Zoran Milanović since 19 February 2020
- Office of the President of the Republic
- Style: Mr President (informal); His Excellency (diplomatic)
- Type: Head of state Commander in chief
- Member of: Armed Forces of Croatia; National Security Council
- Reports to: Croatian Parliament
- Residence: 36 Krajiška Street, Zagreb
- Seat: Presidential Palace, Zagreb
- Appointer: Popular vote
- Term length: Five years; renewable once
- Constituting instrument: Constitution of the Republic of Croatia (1990)
- Inaugural holder: Franjo Tuđman
- Formation: 22 December 1990; 35 years ago
- Deputy: Speaker of the Croatian Parliament
- Salary: €72,800 annually
- Website: predsjednik.hr

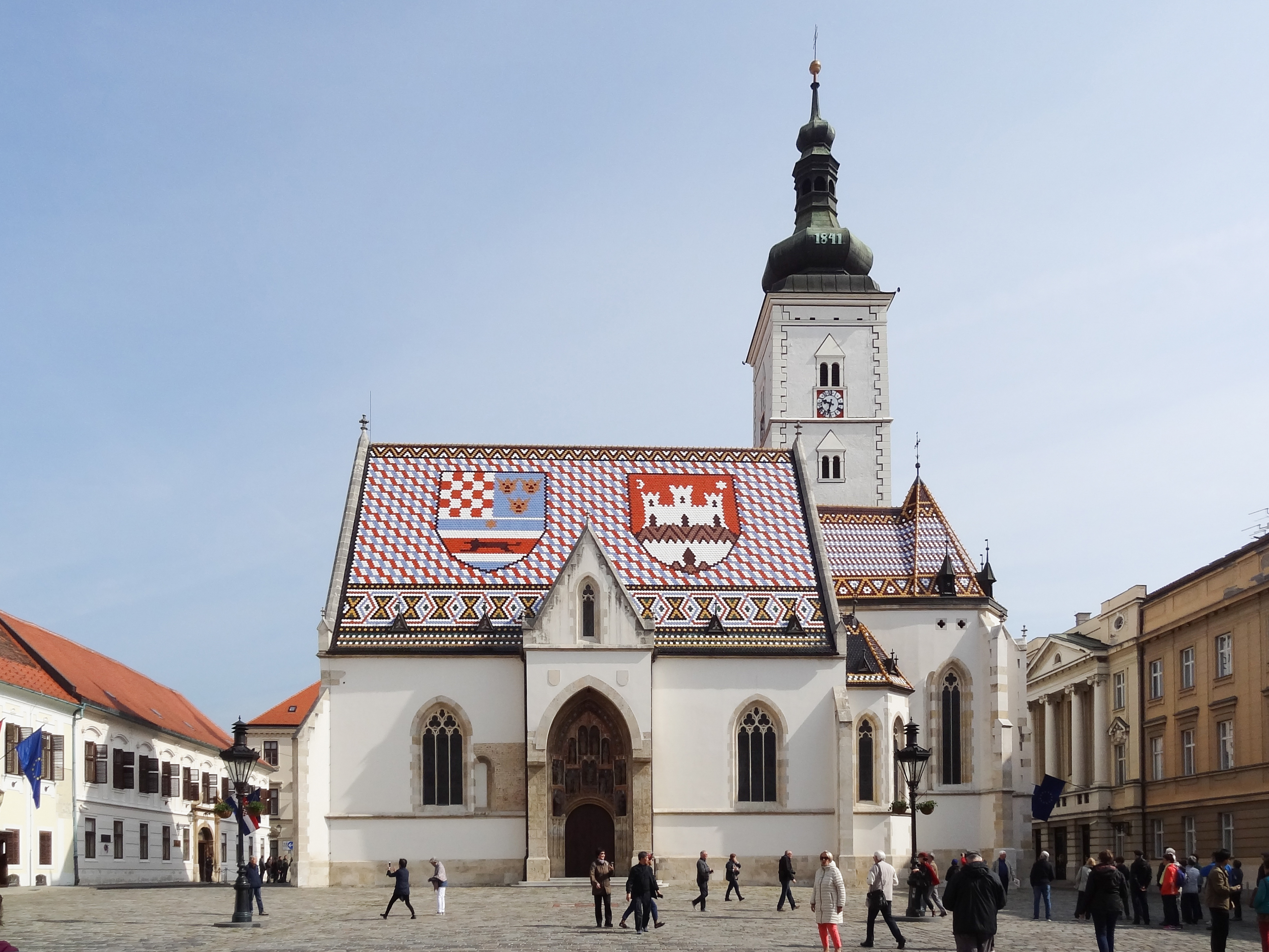
The front of the St. Mark's church in Zagreb is the site of the traditional inauguration of Croatia's presidents. Franjo Tuđman took his oath as President of the Republic in 1992 and 1997, Stjepan Mesić in 2000 and 2005, Ivo Josipović in 2010, and Kolinda Grabar-Kitarović in 2015.

The president of Croatia, officially the president of the Republic of Croatia (Croatian: Predsjednik Republike Hrvatske), is the head of state of Croatia. The president serves as the commander-in-chief of the Croatian Armed Forces and functions as the chief representative of the nation. The office ranks first in the Croatian order of precedence, above the Croatian Prime Minister and Croatian Parliament Speaker. The president yields authority and responsibility to the Croatian Government – led by the prime minister – which is considered the most powerful seat in the Croatian political system. The prime minister directs domestic policy, economic policy, and fiscal policy, collaborating with the president on joint oversight of defence policy and foreign policy.

The president has the power to call ordinary and extraordinary elections for the Croatian Parliament, as well as to call referendums. The president formally appoints the prime minister, grants pardons and awards decorations. The president appoints the director of the Security and Intelligence Agency in agreement with the prime minister. The president may dissolve the parliament under constitutional circumstances. Although enjoying immunity, the president is impeachable for violation of the Constitution. The speaker of the Parliament is first in the presidential line of succession.

The president is elected on the basis of universal suffrage, through a secret ballot, for a five-year term. If no candidate in the elections secures more than 50% of all votes cast , a runoff election is held. The constitution sets a limit of a maximum of two terms in office. The president-elect is required to take an oath of office before the judges of the Constitutional Court. Franjo Tuđman won the first Croatian presidential elections in 1992 and in 1997. The constitution adopted in 1990 provided for a semi-presidential system and was later converted into a parliamentary system in 1999. The president works out of the Presidential Palace in the Pantovčak area of Zagreb.

== List of office-holders ==
This is a graphical timeline listing of the presidents of Croatia since the first multi-party elections in 1990.

== Powers, duties and responsibilities ==
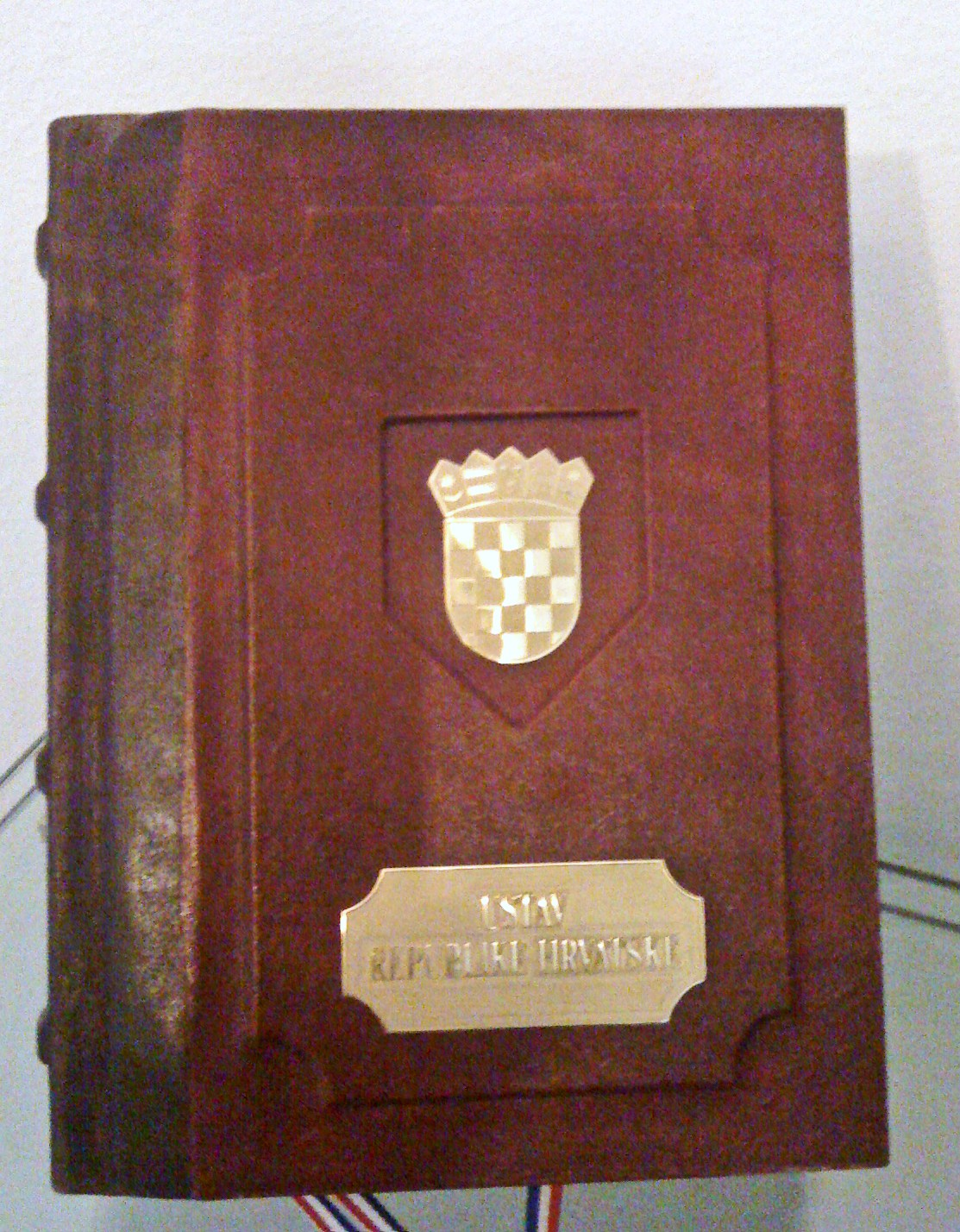
"Constitution no. 1", which is used on the occasion of the presidential inauguration.

The president of Croatia, officially styled President of the Republic (Croatian: Predsjednik / Predsjednica Republike) represents the Republic of Croatia in the country and abroad as the head of state, maintains the regular and coordinated operation and stability of the national government system and safeguards the independence and territorial integrity of the country. The president is barred from executing any other public or professional duty while in office.

The president of Croatia calls elections for the Croatian Parliament (Croatian: Hrvatski Sabor) and convenes the first meeting of the parliamentary assembly. The president is also required to appoint a prime minister, on the basis of the balance of power in the parliament. The appointed candidate is in turn required to seek confirmation from the parliament through a confidence vote, to receive a mandate to lead the Croatian Government (after given confidence by the absolute majority of the MPs, the president formally appoints the candidate as Prime Minister, while PM appoints ministers; all with the countersignature of the speaker of the Croatian Parliament). The president may also call referendums, grant pardons and award decorations and other forms of recognition defined by legislation.

=== Foreign affairs ===
The president of Croatia and the Government cooperate in the formulation and implementation of Croatia's foreign policy. This provision of the constitution is an occasional source of conflict between the president and the government. The president decides on the establishment of diplomatic missions and consular offices of the Republic of Croatia abroad, at the Government's proposal and with the countersignature of the prime minister. The president, following prior countersignature of the prime minister, appoints and recalls diplomatic representatives of the Republic of Croatia, at the proposal of the Government and upon receiving the opinion of an applicable committee of the parliament. The president receives letters of credence and letters of recall from foreign diplomatic representatives.

=== National security and defense ===
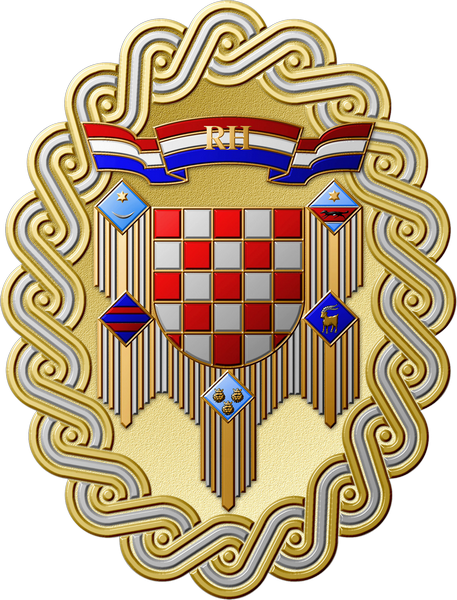
The emblem of the President as the Supreme Commander of the Armed Forces of Croatia

The president of Croatia is the commander-in-chief of the armed forces of the Republic of Croatia and appoints and relieves military commanders of duty, esp. the chief of general staff, conforming to applicable legislation. The President confers ranks on (and promotes) commissioned officers and generals/admirals, upon minister's proposal.

The president cooperates with the government directing operation of the Croatian security and intelligence system. The president and the prime minister jointly appoint heads of the security agencies, and the president may attend cabinet meetings, taking part in discussions held at such meetings. The president and the prime minister jointly convene Defense Council as well as the National Security Council; the president chairs these councils and their meetings.

The president of Croatia is supported in his defense and national security duties and responsibilities by the Military Cabinet (Vojni ured) as a part of the Office of the President, staffed by commissioned officers. The President works closely with the Chief of the General Staff of the Armed Forces.

==== War and state of emergency ====
Pursuant to decisions of the parliament, the president declares war and concludes peace. In cases of immediate threats to the independence, unity and existence of the state, the president may order the use of armed forces, even if no state of war is declared, provided that such an order is countersigned by the prime minister. During a state of war, the president may promulgate regulations with the force of law on the basis of, and within the scope of, authority obtained from the parliament. In such circumstances, the president may convene government cabinet meetings and preside over them. If the parliament is not in session, the president is authorized to regulate all matters required by the state of war through regulations carrying the force of law. In case of an immediate threat to the independence, unity and existence of the state, or if the governmental bodies are prevented from performing their constitutional duties regularly, the president may, at the proposal of the prime minister, issue regulations carrying the force of law. Such regulations must also be countersigned by the prime minister to become valid. The president is required to submit regulations that are promulgated thus to the parliament for approval as soon as the parliament may convene, otherwise the regulations become void.

=== Dissolution of parliament ===
The president of Croatia may dissolve Parliament upon the request of the government if the government proposes a confidence motion to Parliament and the majority of all deputies adopt a motion of no confidence or if Parliament fails to approve government budget 120 days after the budget is proposed in the parliament. That decision must be countersigned by the prime minister to become valid. The president may also dissolve Parliament after a motion of no confidence supported by a majority of all deputies has been adopted and a new government cannot be formed within 30 days or if a new government cannot be formed after general elections (maximum period of 120 days). However, the president may not dissolve Parliament at the request of the government if a procedure to determine if the president has violated provisions of the constitution is in progress.

== Office of the President ==
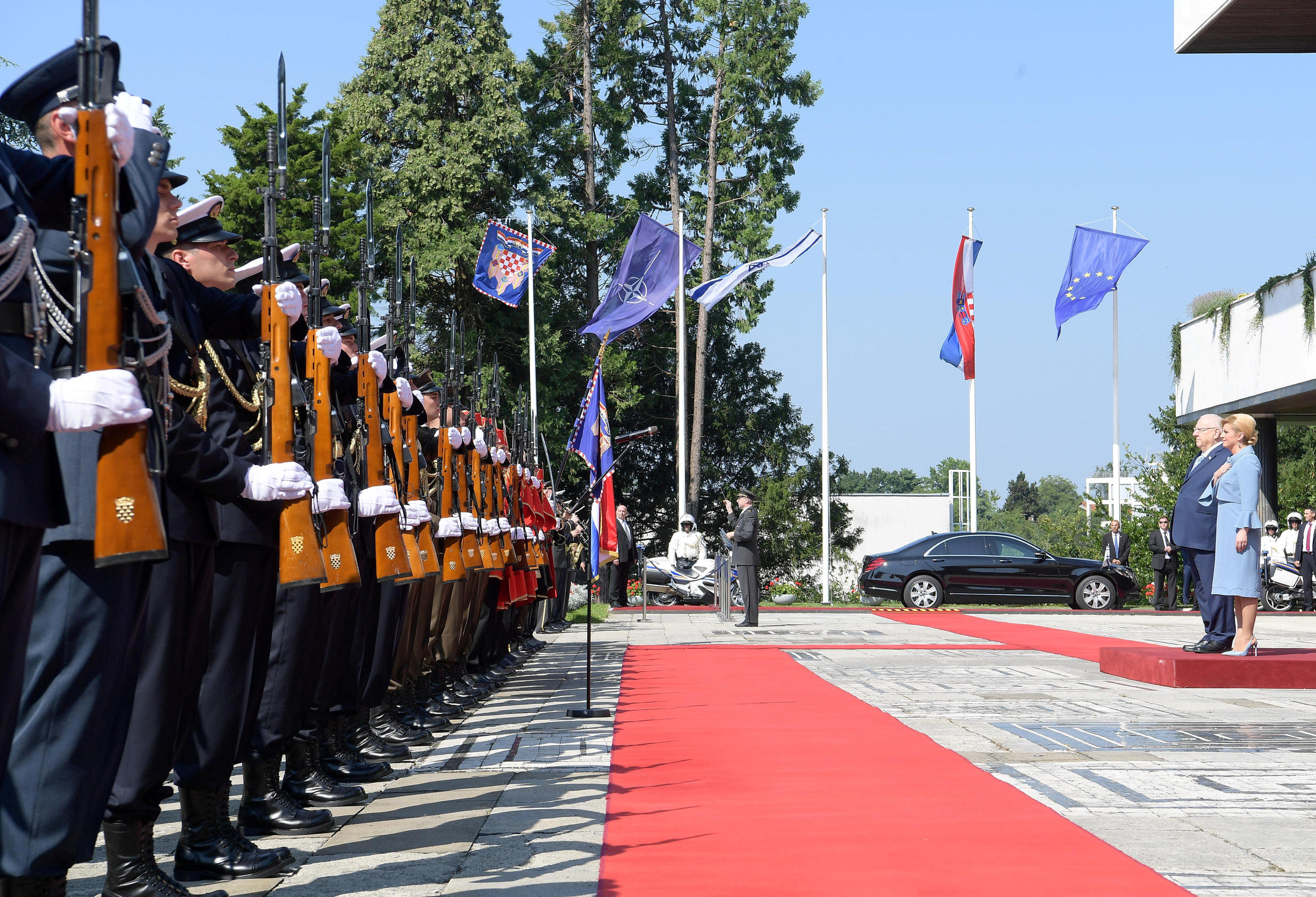
An honor guard in front of the Presidential Palace normally welcomes foreign heads of state. On the picture: President of Israel Reuven Rivlin, first state visit to Croatia 2018.

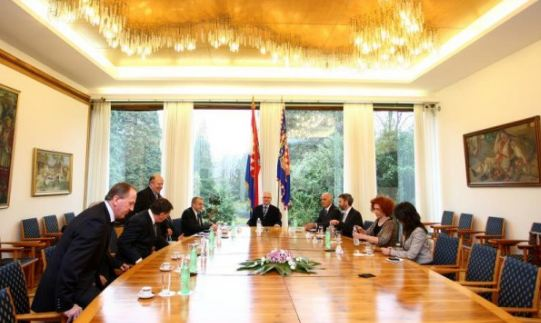
The North Salon is the main conference room in the Presidential Palace.

The Office of the President of the Republic (Croatian: Ured Predsjednika Republike) consists of the immediate staff of the president of Croatia, as well as support staff reporting to the president. As of May 2008, the office employed 170 staff, with the maximum staffing level set at 191 by the Regulation on Internal Organisation of the Office of the President of Croatia. In the 2025 government budget, the office was allocated 9.76 million euros. The net monthly salary of the president is 6,074 euros.

The Office of the President was created by a presidential decree by Franjo Tuđman on 19 January 1991. The office is headed by a chief of staff (Croatian: Predstojnik ureda), who is appointed by the president. The presidents declare bylaws regulating composition of the office. The office employs advisors to the president and comprises 7 cabinets, two councils, the Secretariat and two decorations and awards commissions.

Office of the President of the Republic of Croatia
Position	Name
Chief of Staff	Orsat Miljenić
Head of the Cabinet of the President	Bartol Šimunić
Secretary General of the Office of the President	Dinko Suton
Spokesperson of the Office of the President	Nikola Jelić
Chief of Protocol of the President	Dragana Podner
Adviser to the President for Defense	Ivica Olujić
Adviser to the President for National Security	Dragan Lozančić
Adviser to the President for Foreign and European Policy	Neven Pelicarić
Adviser to the President for Homeland War Veterans	Marijan Mareković
Adviser to the President for Human Rights and Civil Society	Melita Mulić
Adviser to the President for Education	Jadranka Žarković
Special Adviser to the President for the Economy	Velibor Mačkić
Special Adviser to the President for Energy and Climate	Julije Domac
Special Adviser to the President for Culture	Zdravko Zima
Commissioner of the President for Sports	Tomislav Paškvalin

Chiefs of Staff of the President
Chief of Staff	Term start	Term end	Appointed by
Hrvoje Šarinić	15 April 1992	7 August 1992	Franjo Tuđman
Jure Radić	7 August 1992	12 October 1994	Franjo Tuđman
Hrvoje Šarinić	12 October 1994	24 November 1995	Franjo Tuđman
Ivo Sanader	24 November 1995	5 November 1996	Franjo Tuđman
Hrvoje Šarinić	5 November 1996	1998	Franjo Tuđman
Ivica Kostović	1998	January 2000	Franjo Tuđman
Željko Dobranović	22 May 2000	27 April 2001	Stjepan Mesić
Davor Božinović	10 February 2004	30 September 2005	Stjepan Mesić
Boris Šprem	1 October 2005	late 2007	Stjepan Mesić
Amir Muharemi	1 April 2008	19 February 2010	Stjepan Mesić
Joško Klisović	19 February 2010	31 December 2011	Ivo Josipović
Vito Turšić	1 February 2012	18 February 2015	Ivo Josipović
Domagoj Juričić	19 February 2015	2 May 2016	Kolinda Grabar-Kitarović
Anamarija Kirinić	2 May 2016	18 February 2020	Kolinda Grabar-Kitarović
Orsat Miljenić	18 February 2020		Zoran Milanović

=== Presidential Palace ===
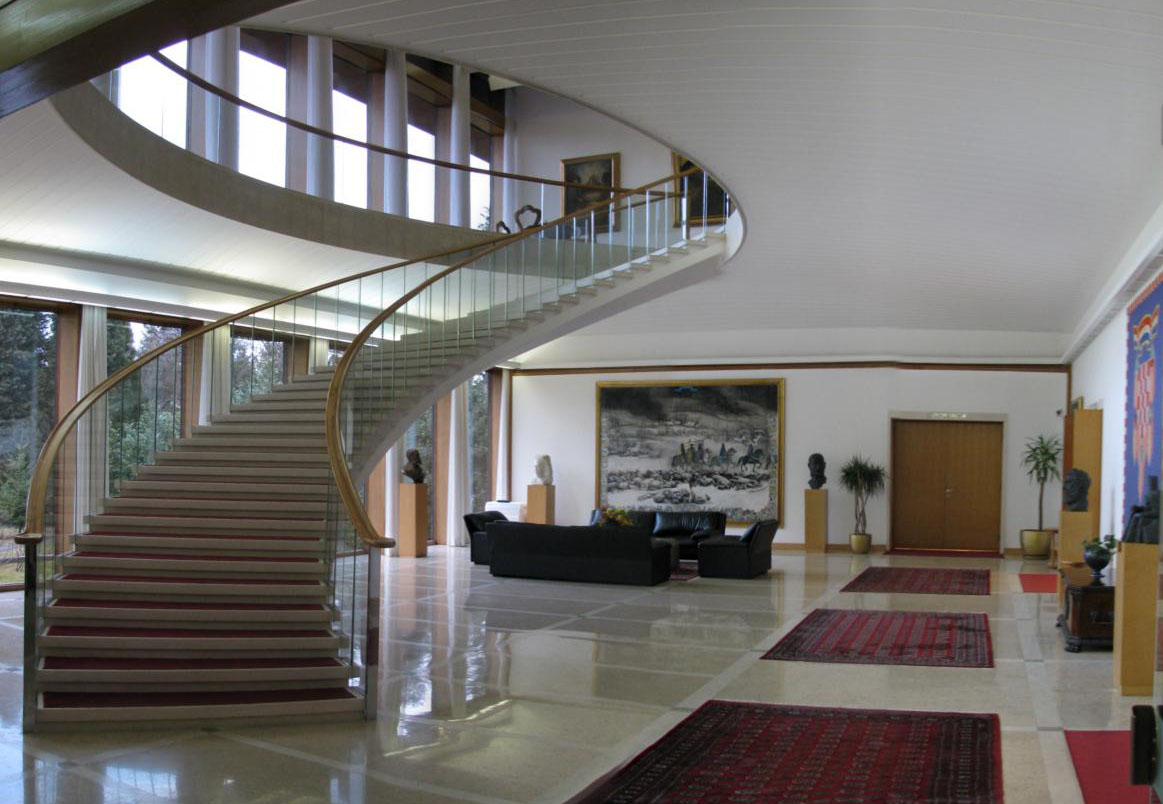
The lobby of the Presidential Palace

The Presidential Palace (Croatian: Predsjednički dvori, also referred to by the metonym Pantovčak) in Zagreb is the official workplace of the president. The president does not actually live in the building, as it is used as the Office of the President of Croatia rather than as a residence. The structure covers 3,700 square metres (40,000 square feet). It had been used as the official residence since then-president Franjo Tuđman moved there following the October 1991 bombing of Banski dvori. In addition to the original building, there is also an 3,500 square metres (38,000 square feet) annex built in 1993, an ancillary structure housing office security services and a bomb shelter predating the 1990s. The building, formerly known as Villa Zagorje or Tito's Villa, was designed by architects Vjenceslav Richter and Kazimir Ostrogović and completed in 1964 for the former Yugoslav president Josip Broz Tito.

== Election and taking office ==
Presidential inaugurations
President	Date	Note
Franjo Tuđman	12 August 1992	first term
Franjo Tuđman	12 August 1997	second term
Stjepan Mesić	19 February 2000	first term
Stjepan Mesić	19 February 2005	second term
Ivo Josipović	19 February 2010	one term
Kolinda Grabar-Kitarović	19 February 2015	one term
Zoran Milanović	19 February 2020	first term
Zoran Milanović	19 February 2025	second term

The president is elected on the basis of universal suffrage, through a secret ballot, for a five-year term. If no candidate in the elections secures more than 50% of the votes, a runoff election is held in 14 days. The Constitution of Croatia sets a limit to a maximum of two terms in office and requires election dates to be determined within 30 to 60 days before the expiry of the term of the incumbent president. Any citizen of Croatia of 18 or over may be a candidate in a presidential election, provided that the candidate is endorsed by 10,000 voters. The endorsements are required in form of a list containing name, address, personal identification number and voter signature. The presidential elections are regulated by an act of the parliament.

The constitution requires that the president-elect resign from political party membership. The president-elect is also required to resign from the parliament as well. Before assuming presidential duty, the president-elect is required to take an oath of office before the judges of the Constitutional Court, swearing loyalty to the Constitution of Croatia. The inauguration ceremony is traditionally held at St. Mark's Square in Zagreb, in front of the St. Mark's Church, midway between the building of the Parliament of Croatia and Banski dvori—the seat of the Government of Croatia. The text of the oath is defined by the Presidential Elections Act amendments of 1997. The text in its Croatian form is not sensitive to gender and all nouns (e.g. Predsjednik (President), državni poglavar (head of state)) always retain their masculine form, even when the president being sworn in is a woman (as was the case with Kolinda Grabar-Kitarović in 2015). There is however a notation within the Constitution of Croatia which states that all nouns used within the text of the document apply equally to both genders. The text of the presidential oath of office is as follows:

Original Croatian text:

Prisežem svojom čašću da ću dužnost predsjednika Republike Hrvatske obavljati savjesno i odgovorno, na dobrobit hrvatskog naroda i svih hrvatskih državljana. Kao hrvatski državni poglavar:

- držat ću se Ustava i zakona,
- brinuti se za poštovanje ustavnopravnog poretka Republike Hrvatske,
- bdjeti nad urednim i pravednim djelovanjem svih tijela državne vlasti,
- čuvati nezavisnost, opstojnost i jedinstvenost države Hrvatske.
Tako mi Bog pomogao.
English version:

I swear with my honor that I will carry out the duty of the President of the Republic conscientiously and responsibly, to the benefit of the Croatian people and all Croatian citizens. As the Croatian head of state I will:

- abide by the Constitution and laws,
- take care that the constitutional order of the Republic of Croatia is respected,
- watch over the orderly and just functioning of all organs of the state,
- guard the independence, existence and unity of the Croatian state.
So help me God.

=== Presidential elections ===
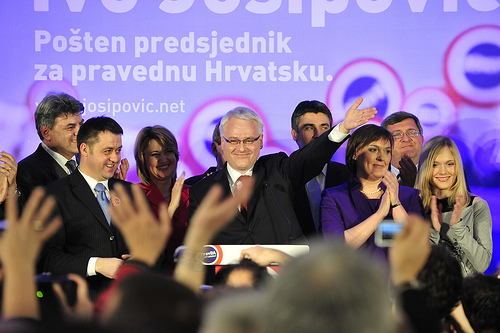
Ivo Josipović, election victory speech

Presidential elections were held in Croatia for the first time on 2 August 1992, simultaneously with the 1992 parliamentary elections. Voter turnout was 74.9%. The result was a victory for Franjo Tuđman of the Croatian Democratic Union (HDZ), who received 57.8% of the vote in the first round of the elections, ahead of 7 other candidates. Dražen Budiša, the Croatian Social Liberal Party (HSLS) candidate and runner-up in the election, received 22.3% of the vote. The second presidential elections in modern Croatia were held on 15 June 1997. The incumbent, Franjo Tuđman ran opposed by Zdravko Tomac, the candidate of the Social Democratic Party of Croatia (SDP), and Vlado Gotovac, nominated by the HSLS. Tomac and Gotovac received 21.0% and 17.6% of votes respectively in the first round of voting, and Tuđman secured another term. The third presidential elections were held on 24 January 2000, to fill the office of the President of the Republic, after the incumbent Franjo Tuđman died on 10 December 1999. The first round of voting saw Stjepan Mesić, candidate of the Croatian People's Party (HNS) in the lead, receiving 41.3% of votes, followed by Dražen Budiša of the HSLS with 27.8% of votes and Mate Granić, nominated by the HDZ, receiving 22.6% of votes. The runoff election, the first in the presidential elections of modern Croatia, was held on 7 February, when Mesić won, picking up 56.9% of votes. Voter turnout in the first round was 63.0% and 60.9% in the runoff. The first round of the fourth presidential elections was held on 2 January 2005. No candidate secured a first-round victory; however, the incumbent Mesić enjoyed a substantial lead over other candidates, as he received 48.9% of votes, and the second and third ranked candidates Jadranka Kosor (HDZ) and Boris Mikšić (independent) managed only 20.3% and 17.8% of voter support respectively. Ultimately, Mesić won reelection, receiving 65.9% of votes in the runoff held on 16 January. The 2009–2010 presidential election was held on 27 December 2009, with Ivo Josipović (SDP) picking up 32.4% of votes, followed by Milan Bandić (independent), Andrija Hebrang (HDZ) and Nadan Vidošević (independent) receiving 14.8%, 12.0% and 11.3% of the votes respectively. The second round of voting was held on 10 January 2010, when Josipović defeated Bandić, receiving 60.3% of the vote. The first round of the most recent presidential election was held on 28 December 2014, where Josipović won 38.46% of the votes, followed by Kolinda Grabar-Kitarović (HDZ) who received 37.22% of ballots. The third was an independent candidate, Ivan Vilibor Sinčić who received 16.42% of votes, and Milan Kujundžić (Croatian Dawn – Party of the People) who was supported by 6.3% of the votes. The runoff was held on 11 January 2015, and Grabar-Kitarović won by a margin of approximately one percentage point.

Election	Candidates	First round voter turnout	First round results (candidates with more than 10% of votes)	Second round voter turnout	Winner	Runner-up
1992	8	74.90%	Franjo Tuđman (56.73%), Dražen Budiša (21.87%)	Not required	Franjo Tuđman (56.73%)	Dražen Budiša (21.87%)
1997	3	54.62%	Franjo Tuđman (61.41%), Zdravko Tomac (21.03%), Vlado Gotovac (17.56%)	Not required	Franjo Tuđman (61.41%)	Zdravko Tomac (21.03%)
2000	9	62.98%	Stjepan Mesić (41.11%), Dražen Budiša (27.71%), Mate Granić (22.47%)	60.88%	Stjepan Mesić (56.01%)	Dražen Budiša (43.99%)
2005	13	50.57%	Stjepan Mesić (48.92%), Jadranka Kosor (20.31%), Boris Mikšić (17.78%)	51.04%	Stjepan Mesić (65.93%)	Jadranka Kosor (34.07%)
2009–10	12	43.96%	Ivo Josipović (32.42%), Milan Bandić (14.83%), Andrija Hebrang (12.04%), Nadan Vidošević (11.33%)	50.13%	Ivo Josipović (60.26%)	Milan Bandić (39.74%)
2014–15	4	47.12%	Ivo Josipović (38.46%), Kolinda Grabar-Kitarović (37.22%), Ivan Vilibor Sinčić (16.42%)	59.05%	Kolinda Grabar-Kitarović (50.74%)	Ivo Josipović (49.26%)
2019–20	11	51.20%	Zoran Milanović (29.55%), Kolinda Grabar-Kitarović (26.65%), Miroslav Škoro (24.45%)	55.00%	Zoran Milanović (52.66%)	Kolinda Grabar-Kitarović (47.34%)
2024–25	8	46.01%	Zoran Milanović (49.68%), Dragan Primorac (19.59%)	44.17%	Zoran Milanović (74.68%)	Dragan Primorac (25.32%)
Source: State Election Commission

=== History ===
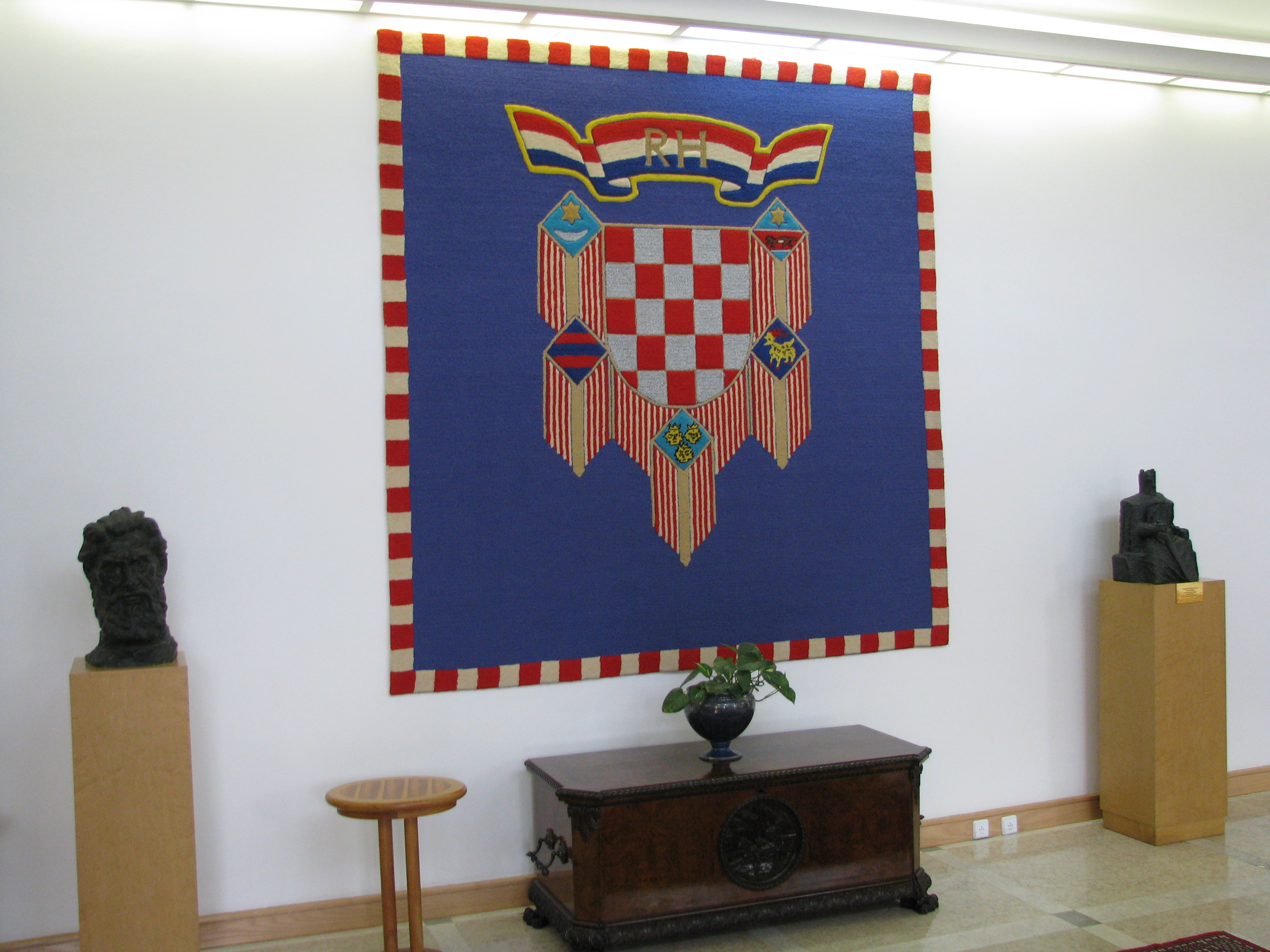
Tapestry in the Office of the President, flanked by a bust of Ante Starčević and a statue of King Tomislav

The Socialist Republic of Croatia within SFR Yugoslavia was led by a group of communist party officials, who formed a collective Presidency with the president of the Presidency at its head. The first democratic elections of 1990 did not elect members of the Presidency directly. Rather, the parliament was tasked with filling these positions as it had done in the socialist period. The HDZ won the elections and its leader Tuđman assumed the presidency on 30 May 1990. On 25 July of the same year, the parliament passed several constitutional amendments, including amendment LXXI, which created the position of President and Vice-Presidents. The Christmas Constitution, passed on 22 December 1990, established the government as a semi-presidential system and called for presidential elections.

Tuđman won the presidential elections in 1992, and was inaugurated on 12 August 1992. He was reelected in 1997, and the Constitution of Croatia was amended the same year. After his death in 1999, the constitution was amended and much of the presidential powers were transferred to the parliament and the government, creating a parliamentary system. Mesić won two consecutive terms in 2000 on the HNS ticket and in 2005, the maximum term permitted by the constitution. Josipović, an SDP candidate, won the presidential elections held in 2009–2010. Grabar-Kitarović won the elections of 2014–15 and she was voted to become the first woman president of Croatia.

== Immunity and impeachment ==
The President of Croatia enjoys immunity—the president may not be arrested, nor can any criminal proceedings be instituted against the president without prior consent from the Constitutional Court. The only case in which immunity does not apply is if the president has been caught in the act of committing a criminal offense, which carries a penalty of imprisonment for more than five years. In such a case the state body that has detained the president must notify the President of the Constitutional Court immediately.

The President of Croatia is impeachable for any violation of the Constitution committed in performance of duty. Impeachment proceedings may be initiated by the Parliament of Croatia by a two-thirds majority vote of all members of the parliament. The impeachment of the president is then decided by the Constitutional Court, by a two-thirds majority vote of all its judges. If the Constitutional Court impeaches the president, the president's term is terminated.

== Vacancy or incapacity ==
In the case of brief incapacitation to execute the office of the President of Croatia due to absence, illness or vacations, the president may transfer his powers to the Speaker of the Croatian Parliament to act as a deputy. The president decides on the revocation of this authority and his return to the office. If the president is prevented from performing his duties for a longer period of time due to illness or other form of incapacitation, and especially if the president is unable to decide on a transfer of powers to a deputy, the Speaker of the parliament becomes the acting president, assuming presidential duty pursuant to a decision of the Constitutional Court, made upon request of the Government.

In the case of death in office or resignation, submitted to the President of the Constitutional Court and communicated to the Speaker of the parliament, or in cases when the Constitutional Court decides to terminate the presidential term through impeachment, the Speaker of the parliament becomes acting president. In those circumstances, new legislation is countersigned by the prime minister instead of the president and a new presidential election must be held within 60 days. This situation occurred after the death of Franjo Tuđman (the only president to date to die in office) on 10 December 1999, when Vlatko Pavletić became the acting president. After the parliamentary elections of 2000, the role was transferred to Zlatko Tomčić, who filled the office until Stjepan Mesić was elected President of Croatia in 2000.

Speakers of the parliament as acting presidents of Croatia
Name	Assumed office	Left office	Notes	Party
Vlatko Pavletić	10 December 1999	2 February 2000	Office expired when the 3rd Sabor was replaced by the 4th	HDZ
Zlatko Tomčić	2 February 2000	18 February 2000	Replaced Pavletić after the 4th Sabor convened	HSS

== Symbols ==
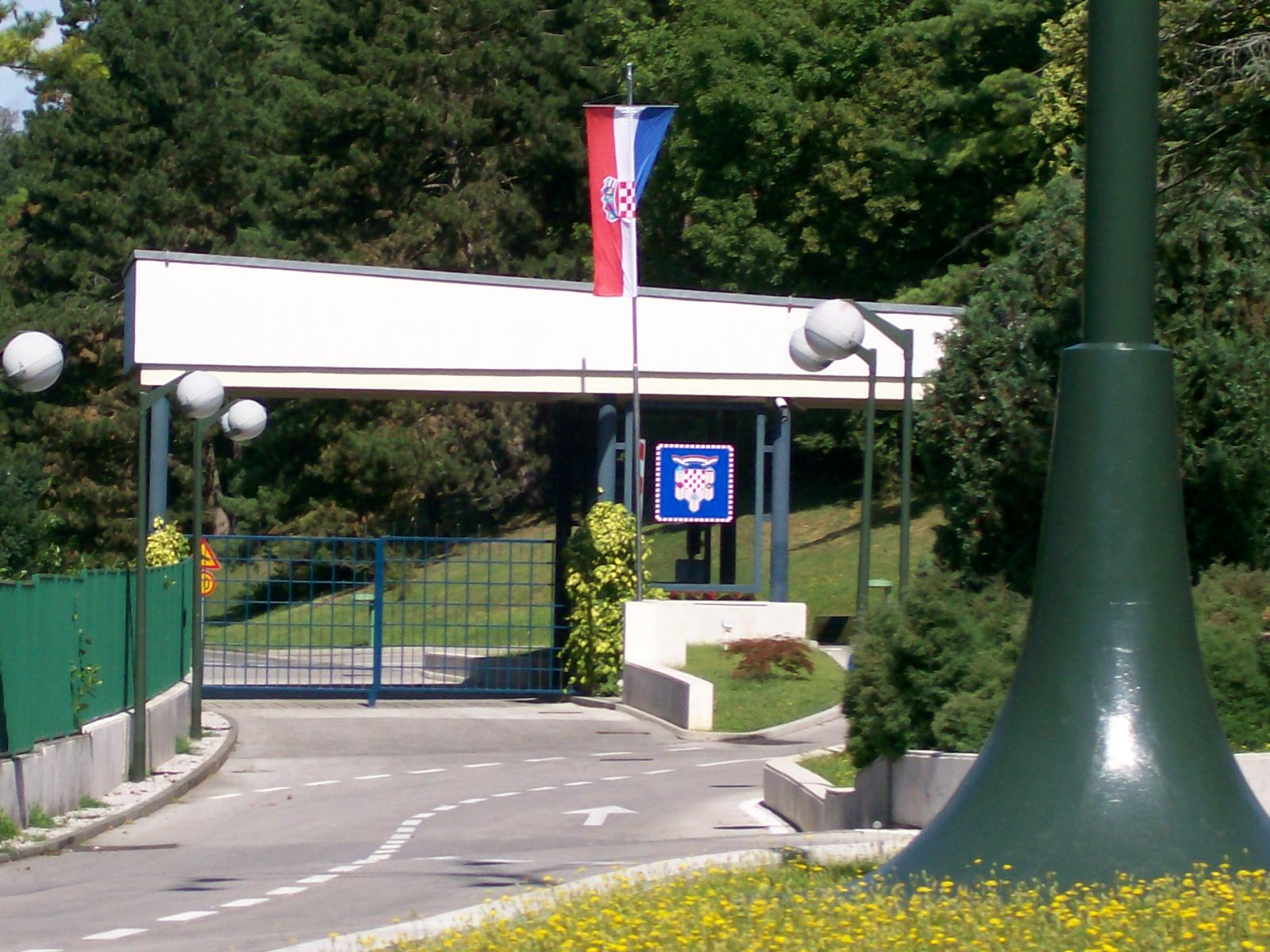
Standard of the president of Croatia flown at the entrance to the Presidential Palace grounds

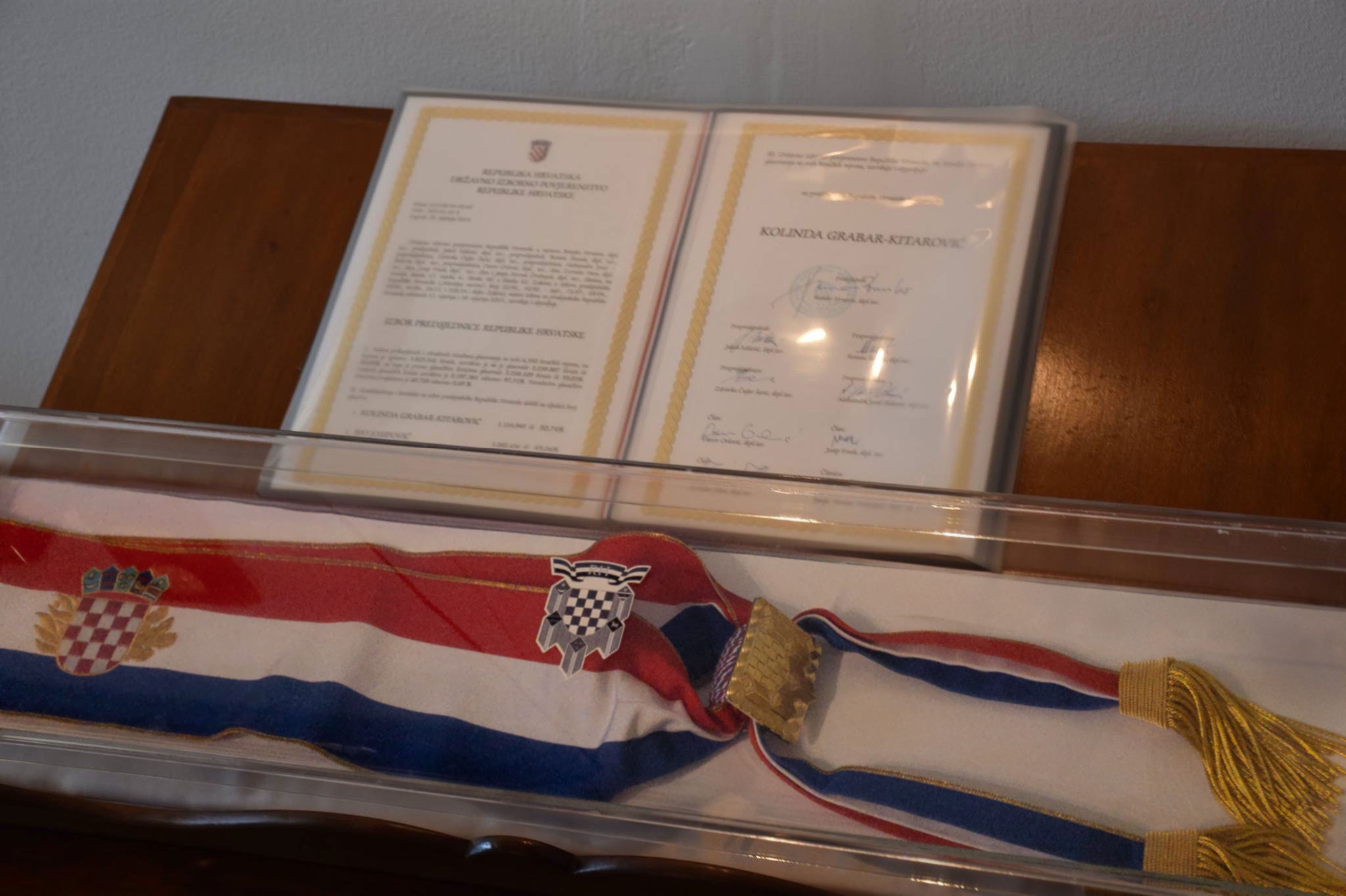
The presidential sash and honorary diploma

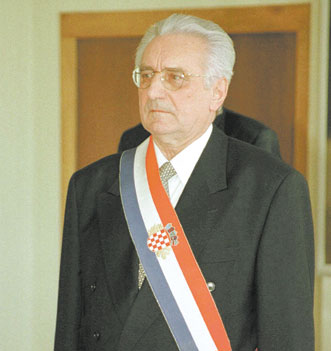
Presidential sash as worn by Franjo Tuđman

Legislation defines the appearance and use of the presidential standard of Croatia as a symbol of the President of Croatia, and the appearance and use of the presidential sash as a symbol of honour of the office of the president. The presidential standard is a square, blue field with a thin border of alternating red and white squares on each side. In the centre of the blue field is the main shield depicts the Croatian checkerboard with five lozenge shields for the historical arms of Croatia surrounding the main shield. From left to right, these are the coats of arms of Central Croatia, the Republic of Dubrovnik, Dalmatia, Istria and Slavonia, adorned with bands of gold, red and white stripes extending down vertically. Atop the shield there is a Croatian tricolour ribbon with golden letters RH that stand for the Republic of Croatia, executed in Roman square capitals. The presidential standard is flown on buildings of the Office of the President of Croatia, the residence of the president, transportation vehicles when in use by the president, and in other ceremonial occasions. The presidential standard was designed by Miroslav Šutej in 1990.

The presidential sash (Predsjednička lenta) is a Croatian tricolour band, trimmed with gold and adorned with the coat of arms of Croatia, which is placed in a white field, with the tricolour at the front. The arms are bordered by oak branches on the left and olive branches on the right (the initial version, however, featured only the shield of the coat of arms). The sash is worn diagonally, over the right shoulder, and is fastened using a square clasp trimmed with golden Croatian interlace. The sash is adorned with the arms used on the presidential standard, although without the ribbon used in the arms. The constitution specifies that the sash is worn on Statehood Day, during awards ceremonies, during the acceptance of letters of credence and in other ceremonial occasions. The presidential sash was brought out of use with the 2000 inauguration of Stjepan Mesić, but was revived in 2015 by Kolinda Grabar-Kitarović during her inauguration and her term in office. It was again retired after the election of Zoran Milanović in 2020.

== Post-presidency ==
Former presidents of the Republic of Croatia are provided with an office and two staff members paid by the state once they leave the office. In addition, former presidents are assigned a driver, an official car and bodyguards. The government of Croatia is required to provide these benefits within 30 days following the end of the term of president, upon a president's personal request. Stjepan Mesić's office is located in Grškovićeva Street in Zagreb. The office employs a public-relations advisor and a foreign policy advisor. The office was established in 2010 and assigned an annual budget of 1.3 million kuna (c. 175,000 euro). According to Mesić himself, his new office of the former president shall be at the disposal of Croatian companies to help them expand their market. Since the office has been established, former president Mesić also receives foreign diplomats and visits abroad where he meets officials and delivers lectures on occasion.

The rights of the former presidents are defined by a parliamentary Act enacted in 2004, during the first term of Stjepan Mesić. Before that act was enacted, the constitution provided that the former presidents shall become members of the Chambers of Counties of the Parliament of Croatia for life, unless otherwise requested by the president. This was never exercised in practice, since Franjo Tuđman died in office and the Chamber of Counties was abolished before the end of the first term of Stjepan Mesić.

== See also ==
- List of presidents of Croatia
- Prime Minister of Croatia
  - List of cabinets of Croatia
- Speaker of the Croatian Parliament
- List of heads of state of the Socialist Republic of Croatia
- Secretary of the League of Communists of Croatia
- List of heads of state of Yugoslavia
- Prime Minister of Yugoslavia
