= British Square =

British Square may refer to:

- British Square (card game), a patience or solitaire game
- British Square (Zagreb), a city square in Croatia
- Infantry square, the military formation alluded to by Kipling as a British square
