= Banski dvori =

Seat of the Government of Croatia in Zagreb

Ban's Court
- Banski dvori
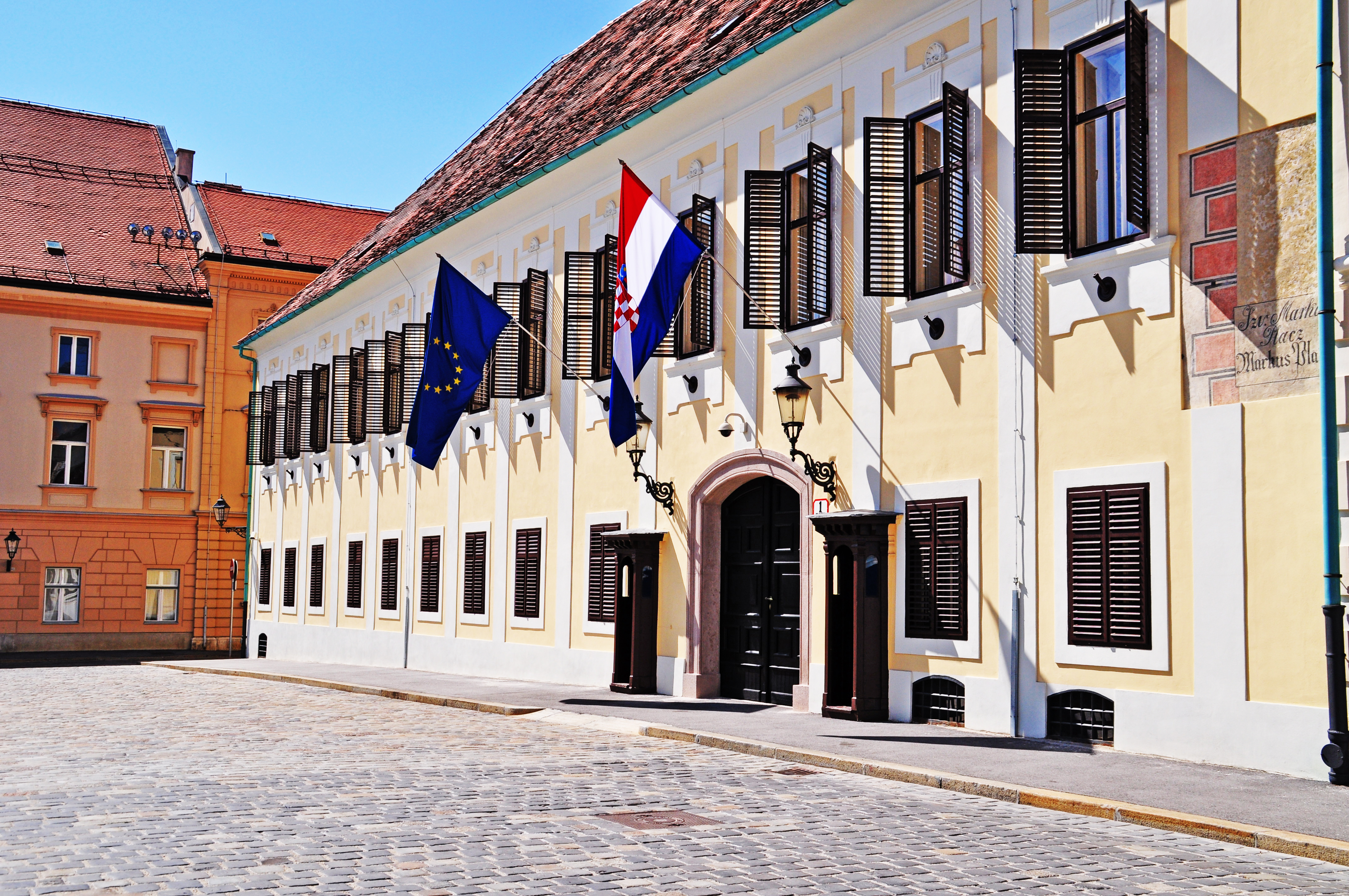
- The main façade of Banski dvori
- Interactive map of the Ban's Court area
- Alternative names: Government Building

General information
- Architectural style: Baroque Classicism
- Location: Gornji grad, Zagreb, 1-2 St. Mark's Square, Zagreb, Croatia
- Coordinates: 45°48′59″N 15°58′23″E
- Current tenants: Government of Croatia
- Completed: 18th century
- Owner: Republic of Croatia

Technical details
- Floor count: 3

Banski dvori (pronounced [bâːnskiː dvɔ̌ːri]; "Ban's Court") is a historical building on the west side of St. Mark's Square in Zagreb, Croatia. It served as the official residence of the Croatian Bans (viceroys) and currently houses the Croatian Government.

The Banski dvori is a two-storey baroque building constructed and expanded at the end of 18th and during the first half of the 19th century on the basis of earlier buildings. It was the residence of Croatian bans from 1809 to 1918, hence the name Banski dvori ("Ban's Court"). During this period, it housed the Tabula Banalis and later the Royal Court Table. Ban Josip Jelačić, for whom Ban Jelačić Square is named, was a resident of Banski dvori.

During World War II and the so-called Independent State of Croatia (1941–1945) it served as the office of Poglavnik Ante Pavelić and was called Poglavnikovi dvori (Poglavnik's Court). Between 1945 and 1991, the period of the SFR Yugoslavia, the Banski dvori was the official residence of the Presidency of the Socialist Republic of Croatia. In May 1990, it became the official residence of the President and the Government of Croatia. On 7 October 1991, the Yugoslav People's Army carried out an airstrike targeted at President Franjo Tuđman, President of Presidency of Yugoslavia Stipe Mesić, and President of the Federal Executive Council of Yugoslavia Ante Marković. All survived the attack. On the following day, the Croatian Parliament declared independence of Croatia from Yugoslavia. In 1992, the President moved its residence to the Presidential Palace.

== History ==
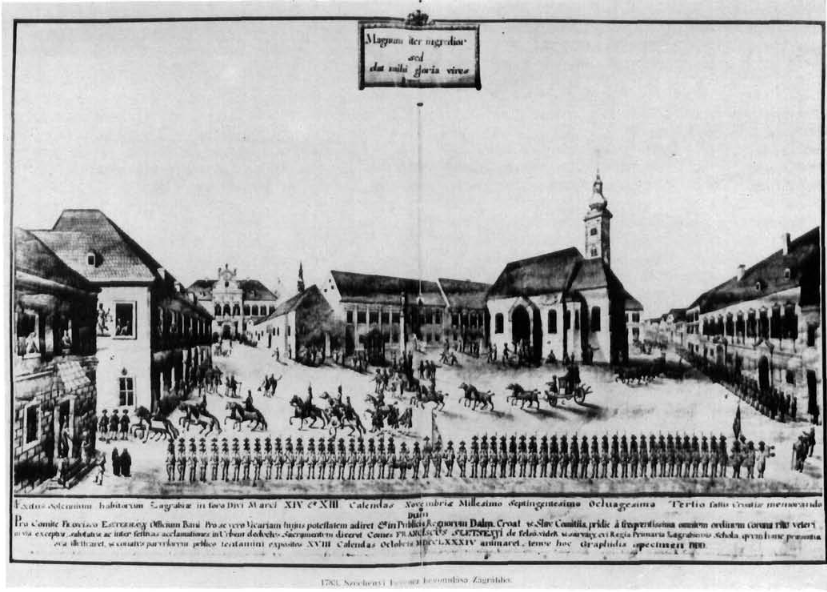
Kulmer palace (center) depicted in 1783, during the installation ceremony of Ferenc Esterházy as Ban of Croatia

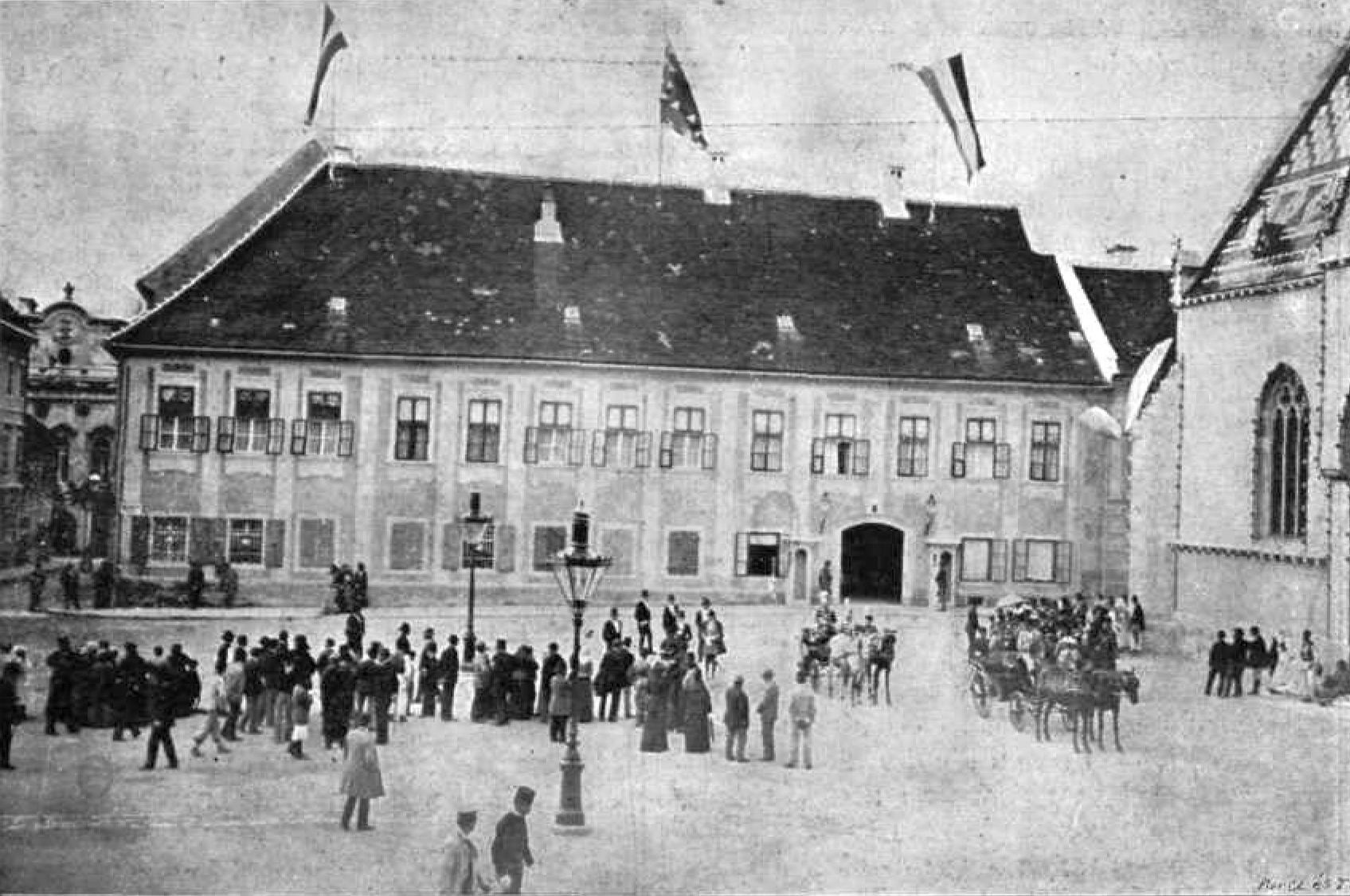
Banski dvori during the visit of King Franz Joseph I of Austria to Zagreb 1895, at the time the capital of the Kingdom of Croatia-Slavonia

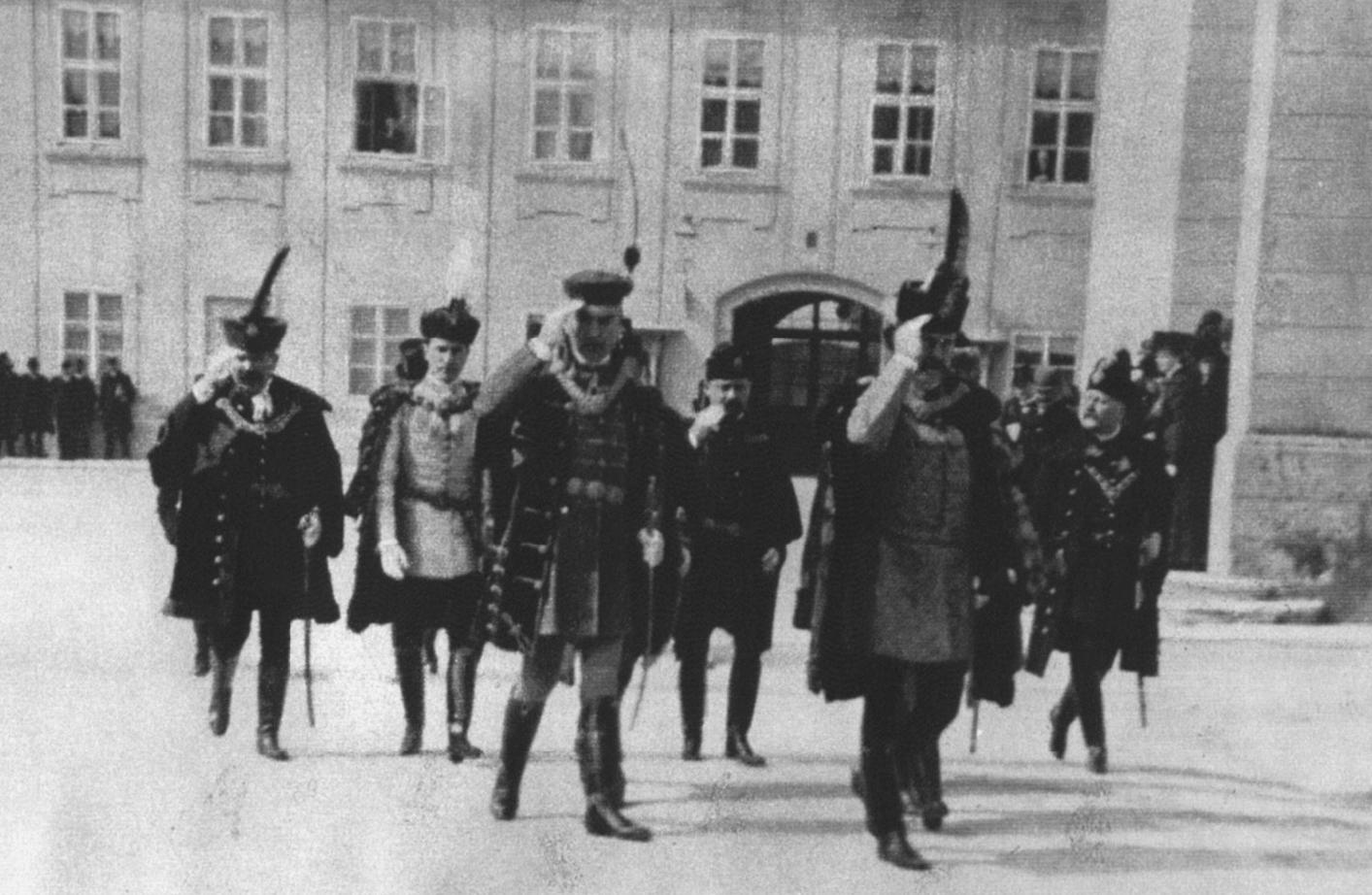
Pavao Rauch, Ban (viceroy) of Croatia-Slavonia and dignitaries in front of the Banski dvori

Banski dvori was built in the baroque classicism style at the end of the 18th century on the site of the Petar Zrinski's house. Since the properties of the Zrinski family were seized in 1671 after unsuccessful Magnate conspiracy, Petar Zrinski's house on St. Mark's Square was sold to the Čikulini family, later to Count Petar Troilo Sermage and finally Kulmer family. When the old Zrinski house (at the time already known as the Sermage-Kulmer palace) was damaged by fire, Ivan Kulmer renovated it and expanded it to the neighboring buildings. In 1801, he began building a representative palace but ended up selling unfinished project to the Government of the Kingdom of Croatia-Slavonia in 1808 for 75,000 forints. Namely, the Croatian Parliament, who shared the building with the administration of the Zagreb County until 1807, decided to buy a building which would be able to accommodate Parliament, highest courts, and the office of the Croatian Ban, and be used as a storage for the public records and royal books (parliamentary records). Consequently, a year later, Ban Ignác Gyulay sold an old parliamentary palace to the Zagreb County which started using it as a town hall, and bought Baron Ferdinand Kulmer's house on the west side of St. Mark's Square. The sales contract was excavated on 1 August 1808. Although there was not enough room for parliamentary sessions in this building, Gyulay's main intention was to ensure that Ban had official residence so the palace was named "Banska palača" [Ban's palace] and later "Banski dvori" [Ban's Court]. By the beginning of 1809, the palace was renovated and upgraded so Ban, Royal State Archives, highest courts, and the Croatian Parliament moved in. In 1837, the north complex, the northern wing of the present-day Banski dvori, was purchased from the Rauch family, and after the expansion of the west and north wings, the Ban and the judiciary moved to that part of the palace. On 10 September 1850, during the tenure of Ban Josip Jelačić, who lived and died in the palace, the telegraph wire was installed in the palace so Zagreb become connected to the Vienna-based power grid. On 28 April 1850, Deputy Ban Mirko Lentulaj sent the first Croatian telegraph ("Telegraph is in order") to Ban Jelačić, who was at the time in the official state visit to Vienna. The last major upgrading and expansion of the northwest part of the complex was carried out in 1882, at the end of Ban Ivan Mažuranić's tenure. Thereafter, there were no major interventions on Banski dvori which would change the volume and spatial relations of the palace. At the beginning of the Ban Nikola Tomašić's tenure (1910–1912), Banski dvori was decorated and renovated. The old reception hall was subdivided and redecorated. In addition, a mirrored ceiling was constructed, mounted old valuable chandeliers installed, the old iron furnace replaced by a ceramic furnace, and portraits of Croatian Ban placed in the great hall.

=== 1918–1990 ===
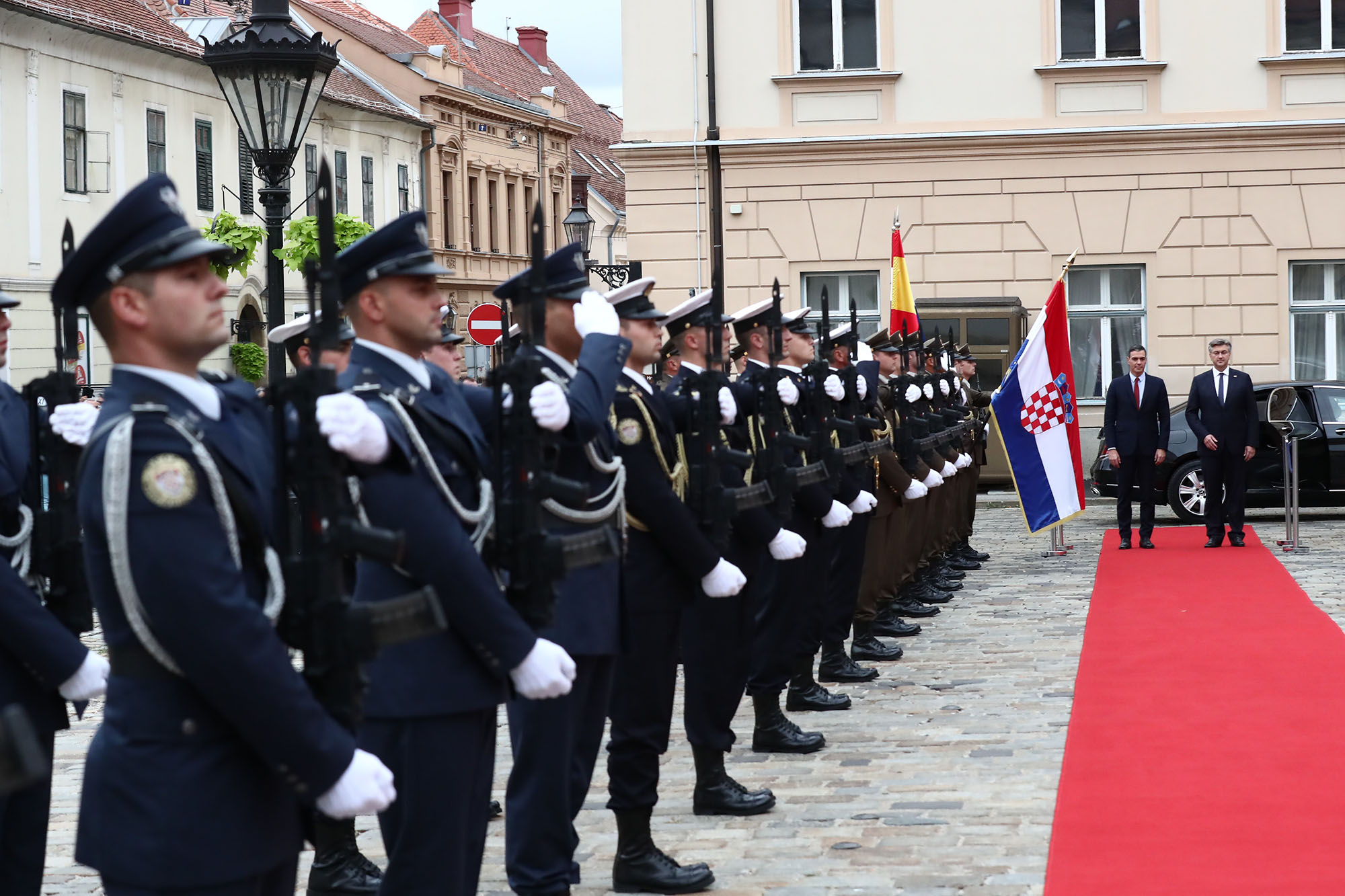
Honor guard in front of Banski dvori, welcoming Spanish Prime Minister Pedro Sánchez and Andrej Plenković.

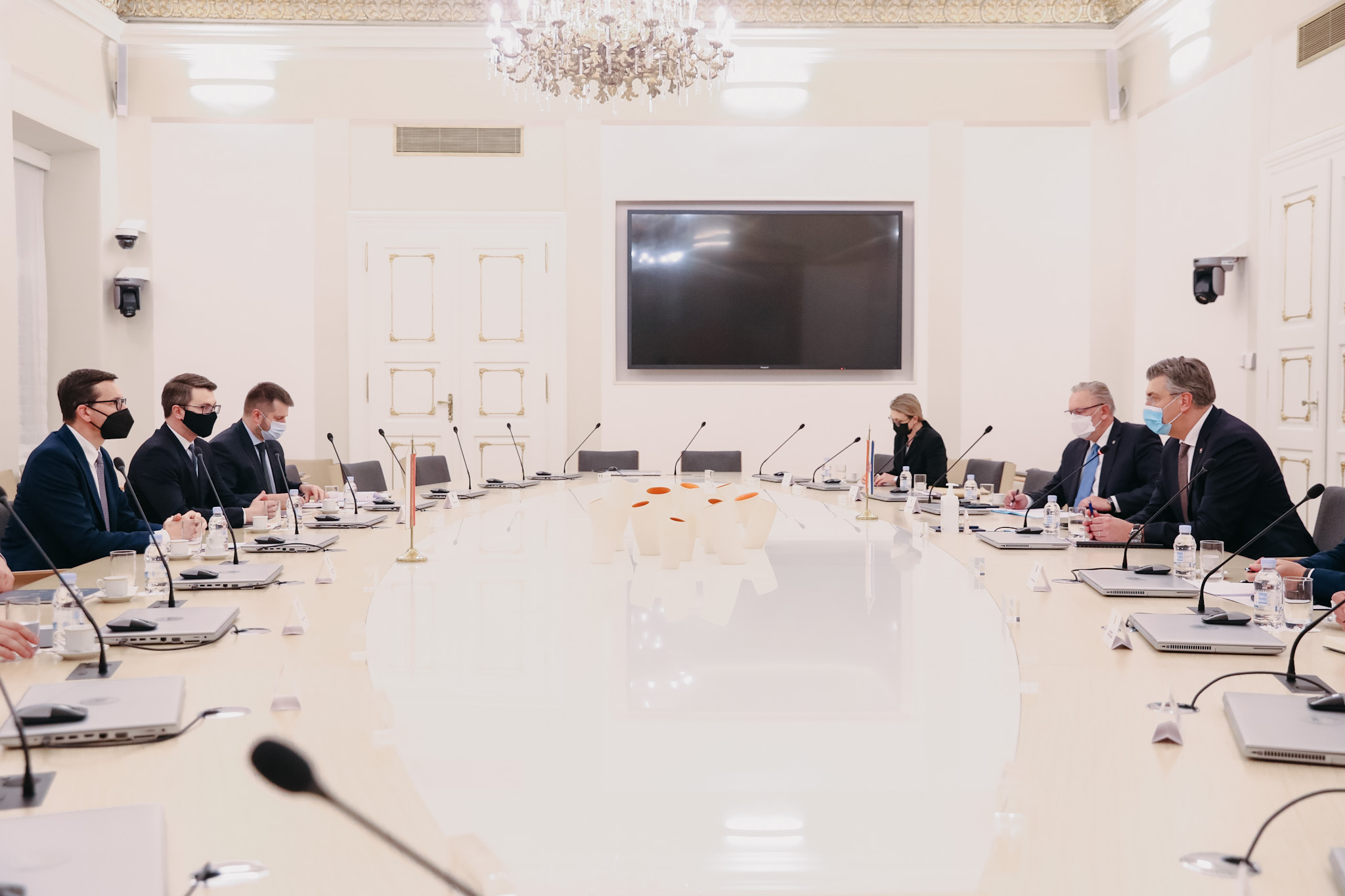
Ban Jelačić Hall, Pictured 2021.

After the dissolution of Austria-Hungary in 1918, Banski dvori housed Government of the State of Slovenes, Croats and Serbs and then the remaining institutions of the Kingdom of Croatia, Slavonia and Dalmatia during the transitional period of the creation of the Kingdom of Yugoslavia. Since 1929, Banski dvori housed Government of Sava Banovina, and since 1939, Government of Banovina of Croatia. On 26 August 1940 Yugoslav government held a session there. During the time of the so-called Independent State of Croatia (1941-1945), Banski dvori was used as the office of Ante Pavelić and the headquarters of the Government of the Independent State of Croatia. Since 1945 they were used as the headquarters of the Presidency and Government of the Socialist Republic of Croatia.

=== 1990–present ===
In 1990, Banski dvori became the seat of the President and the Government of Croatia. On 7 October 1991, Yugoslav Air Force and Serbs bombed Banski dvori with the aim to assassinate Croatian President Franjo Tuđman, President of the Presidency of Yugoslavia Stjepan Mesić and President of the Federal Executive Council Ante Marković. None of them were hurt. The presidential residence was immediately moved to the Presidential palace, which was formerly known as Villa Zagorje. The Banski dvori sustained significant damage, but repairs started only in 1995. The building became the seat of the Croatian Government. Between 2001 and 2002, two inner courtyards where fully reconstructed and decorated. Next major renovation occurred in summer of 2008. The whole facade was restored, dormant carpentry replaced, two meeting rooms and the so-called Blue salon renovated, and lobby and sanitary node redecorated. The project was carried out in accordance with the requirements of the Croatian Directorate for the Protection of Cultural Heritage. In summer of 2017, floors with oak parquet and ceiling stuccos and rosette where refurbished. Various carpentry, locksmith and electrical engineering (lighting, information systems, TV installations and recording, sound and simultaneous translation, etc.) works were also carried out. Air conditioning and ventilation systems were changed as well. In addition, The Ban Jelačić Hall, in which the government sessions are held, has also been thoroughly restored.

== Gallery ==
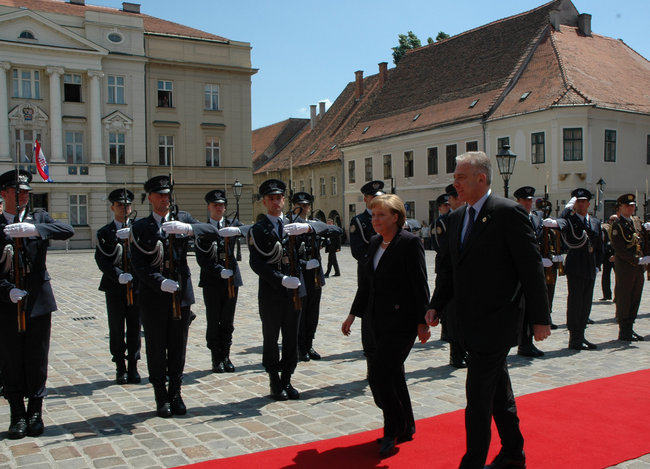
Honor guard in front of Banski dvori, welcoming Angela Merkel and Ivo Sanader.

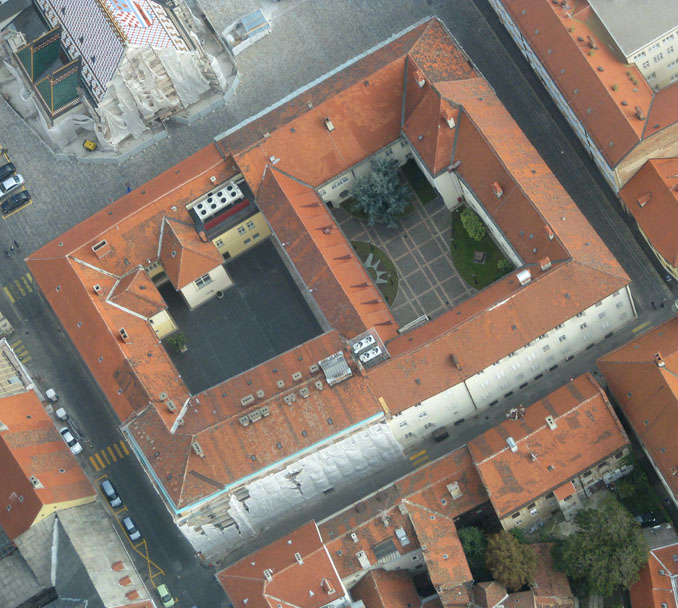
Aerial view of Banski dvori

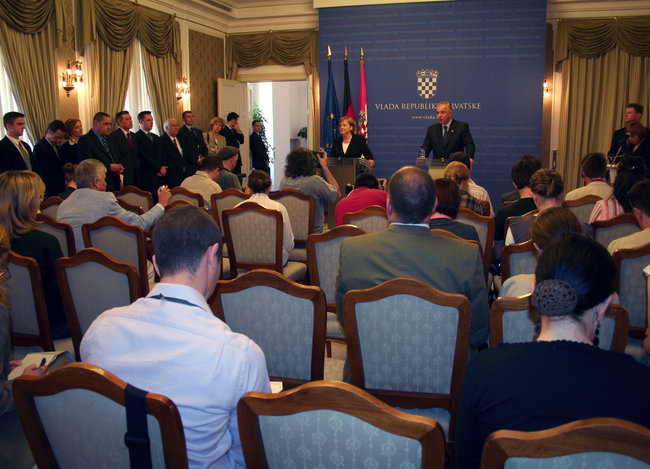
Press room

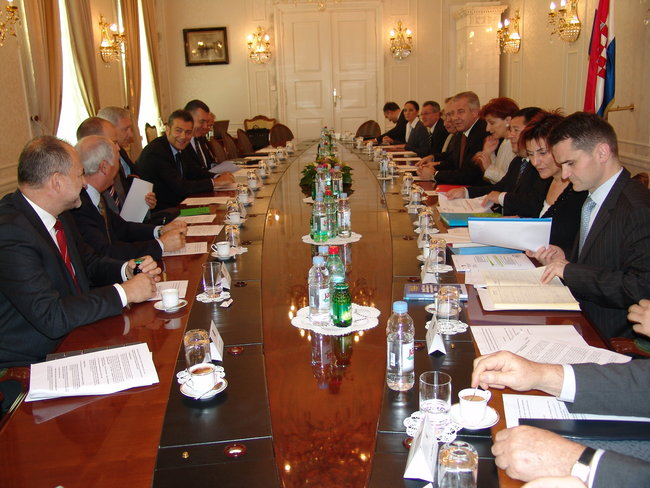
One of the conference rooms

== See also ==
- 2020 St. Mark's Square attack
