= St. Mark's Square, Zagreb =

Public square in the historic center of Zagreb, Croatia

St. Mark's Square
- Public square
- {{{other_names}}}
- Trg Svetog Marka
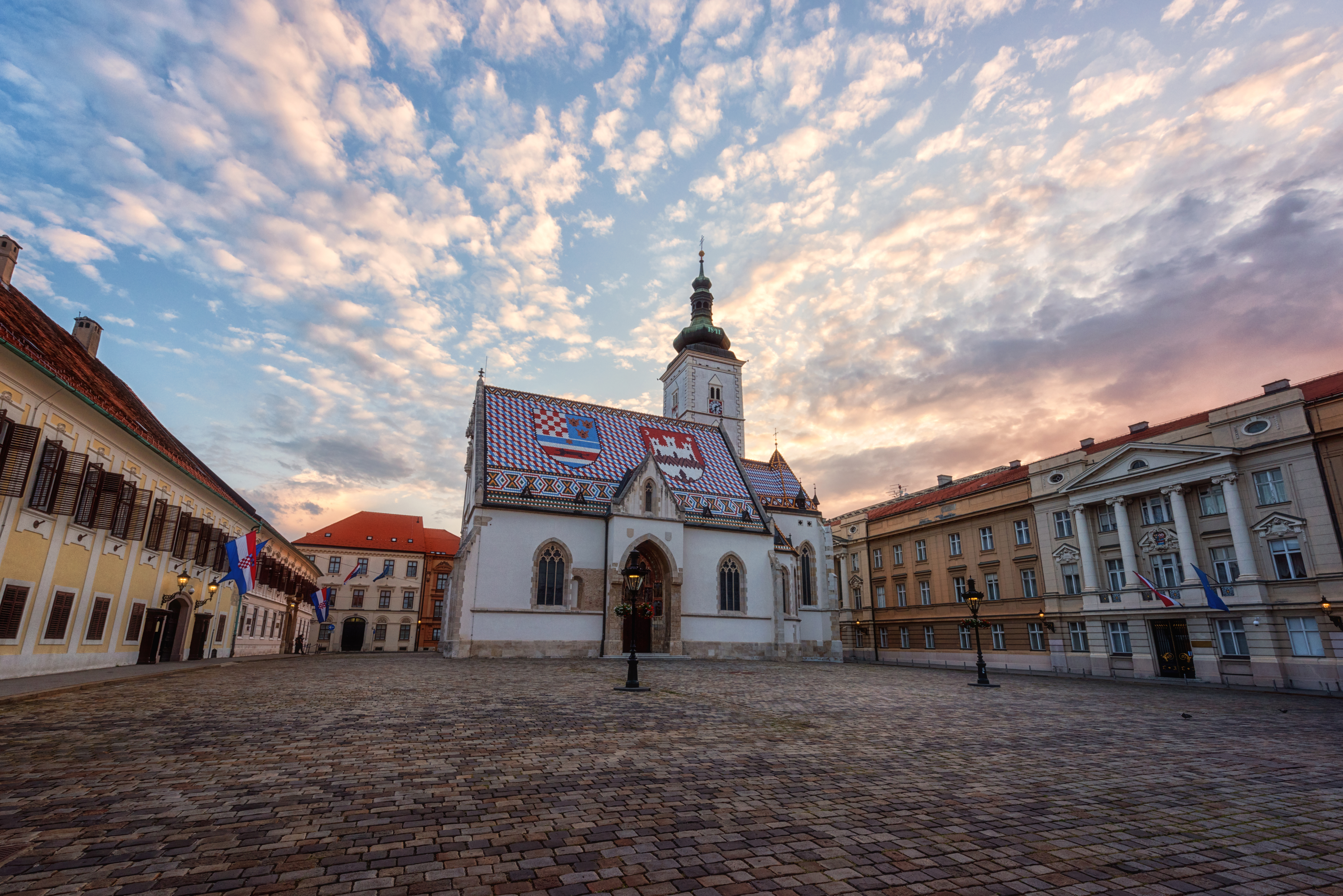
- St. Mark's Square with Croatian Parliament, St. Mark's Church, Banski Dvori and Constitutional Court of Croatia
- Location: Zagreb, Croatia
- Interactive map of St. Mark's Square
- Coordinates: 45°48′59″N 15°58′26″E

St. Mark's Square (Croatian: Trg svetog Marka, abbreviated Trg sv. Marka, also known as Markov trg) is a town square located in the old part of Zagreb, Croatia, known as the Gradec or Gornji grad (English: Upper town).

In the center of square is located St. Mark's Church. The square also sports important governmental buildings: Banski dvori (the seat of the Government of Croatia), Sabor Palace (the seat of the Croatian Parliament) and Constitutional Court of Croatia. On the corner of St. Mark's Square and the Street of Ćiril and Metod is the Old City Hall, where the Zagreb City Council held its sessions. The square is surrounded with museums including: Croatian History Museum, Croatian Museum of Naïve Art, Zagreb City Museum and Museum of Broken Relationships.

== History ==
The story of Matija Gubec, the leader of the great uprising of the Croatian peasants, would also be extracted from the long history of Mark's Square. Matija Gubec led the peasant army in the battle against the nobles near Stubičke Toplice in 1573. In that battle, the peasants were defeated, and their leader Matija Gubec was captured and executed on 15 February. Before he was executed, he was allegedly publicly tortured in Markov Square, and it is believed that the face on the corner of the building on Mark's Square represents him.

After the assassination of Stjepan Radić in 1928, the Square changed its name in honor of Stjepan Radić, which was then called "Trg. Stjepana Radića" ("Square of Stjepan Radić / Stjepan Radić Square") but eventually the historical name was returned in 1990.

Croatian Parliament has been sitting on this location since the first session held in 1737. The buildings have their present appearance from the beginning of the 20th century. Decisions on secession from Austria-Hungary in 1918 and exit from Yugoslavia in 1991 were made there.

== In modern times ==
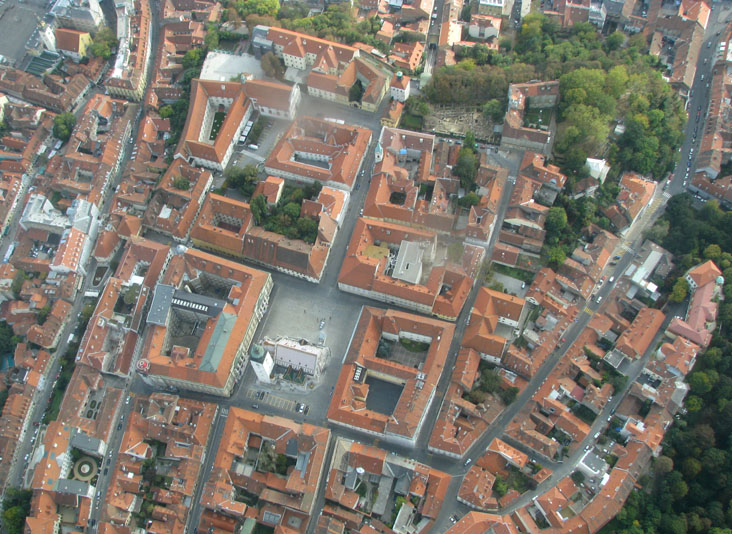
Aerial view of St. Mark's Square

=== 2000s ===
In 2006, the square underwent a renovation project, paved with granite blocks In August 2005, the Government forbid any form of protests on St. Mark's Square, which caused controversies in Croatian civil society. This ban was partially lifted in 2012.

=== 2020 shooting ===
On morning of 12 October 2020, a 22-year-old Danijel Bezuk from Kutina came on St. Mark's Square with assault rifle (AK-74) and started shooting at the Croatian Police who were protecting the entrance of Banski Dvori, in his attempt to enter the Banski Dvori where Prime Minister of Croatia has his office. He wounded a police officer, a 33-year-old Oskar Fiuri, who was guarding the main entrance, wounding him with four rounds, after which he continued shooting on Banski dvori. Another police officer who was guarding the Parliament on the opposite side of the square noticed what was happening, so he took out his personal weapon and fired at the attacker. Bezuk ran to the nearby street to take cover and reloaded his gun. He then returned and fired on the police again, but was again suppressed by the police fire, and fled the scene in response. After the aftermath, Bezuk ran to Jabukovac street where he took his own life.

In February 2021, Prime Minister Andrej Plenković stated that the motive of the attack was his party Croatian Democratic Union's (HDZ) coalition with the Independent Democratic Serb Party (SDSS). In the immediate aftermath of the shooting, President Zoran Milanović held a press conference in which he called the government to protect the central state institutions, saying that "they are not a tourist destination". Therefore, since October 2020, the St. Mark's Square remains closed for visitors, tourists and residents who live at nearby buildings.

Until 2020 the square was also the site of the inaugurations of Croatia's presidents. Franjo Tuđman took his oath as President of the Republic in 1992 and 1997, Stjepan Mesić in 2000 and 2005, Ivo Josipović in 2010, and Kolinda Grabar-Kitarović in 2015. However, in 2020 Zoran Milanović decided to take his oath in the Presidential Palace instead.

=== 2024 self-immolation incident ===
On Tuesday around 9:40 a.m. on 12 June 2024, on the south side of Zagreb's Mark's Square, a 57-year-old doused himself in gasoline and lit himself on fire. The male person who set himself on fire on was treated at the Traumatology Clinic of the KBC Sisters of Charity in the intensive care unit where he later died of his injuries after 9 pm, according to the press release. Although the police did not announce his identity, it was found out that he was a 57-year-old man from Virje, who lived in Koprivnica, a pensioner, who previously worked at Croatian Railways Cargo. The motive is still unknown, and the St. Mark's square is still closed for public.

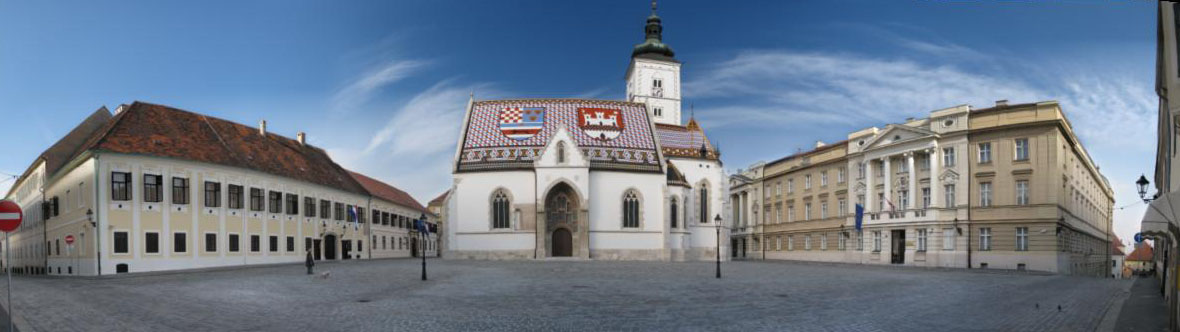
St. Mark's Square, Zagreb – Left-to-right: Banski dvori, St. Mark's Church and Sabor Palace

== Sources ==
- Podnar, Ivana (2009). "Zagrebački trgovi kao urbani identitetski sustavi" (PDF). Prostor (in Croatian). 17 (2(38)).
