= 2020 St. Mark's Square shooting =

Civilian attack in Croatia

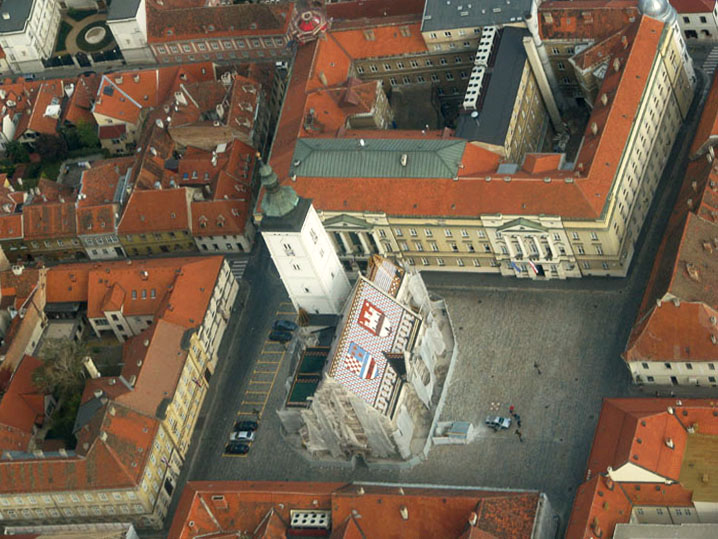
- St. Mark's Square where the attack occurred
- Location: 45.816554°N 15.973336°E; St. Mark's Square; Zagreb, Croatia
- Date: 12 October 2020; 6 years ago c. 08:03 AM (CEST)
- Target: Banski dvori
- Attack type: Attempted murder; Lone wolf terrorism
- Weapon: 5.45 x 39 mm AK-74 Automatic Rifle
- Deaths: 1 (the perpetrator)
- Injuries: 1 police officer
- Perpetrator: Danijel Bezuk
- Motive: Anti-establishment
- Convicted: Bezuk's Father

On 12 October 2020, at 8:03 AM CEST, a shooting occurred in St. Mark's Square, Zagreb, Croatia, (Note: Croatian: Napad na Trgu svetog Marka) when 22-year-old Danijel Bezuk approached Banski dvori – the headquarters of the Croatian government and Prime Minister – and started firing at it with a AK-74 assault rifle, wounding a police officer in the process. In the aftermath, the perpetrator ran off to a nearby neighborhood and committed suicide. The shooting was formally classified as an act of lone wolf terrorism, motivated by anti-establishment beliefs.

== Attack ==
External videos
- Video of the attack to the Croatian government building at the St. Mark's Square on YouTube (1:50)

The attack was committed by 22-year-old Danijel Bezuk from Kutina, Croatia, who did not appear at his workplace in Zagreb, but instead headed to St. Mark's Square, where the buildings of the Croatian government (Banski dvori), Croatian Parliament (Sabor) and the Constitutional Court are located. He was not immediately stopped due to concealing his AK-74 in his jacket, when he approached the Parliament building he took out the automatic rifle (5.45×39mm AK-74) and opened fire on the 33-year-old police officer, Oskar Fiuri, who was guarding the main entrance, wounding him with four rounds, Bezuk then directed automated burst fire across the front doors, windows, and exterior facade of the Banski dvori.

Immediately when Bezuk started firing a civilian worker pulling a cart of government files was talking to the police officer, when the gunfire began the worker sprinted towards the back of a nerby parked car, Bezuk completely ignored the man transporting the documents. He bypassed him entirely to target the police officer posted at the entrance and fire at the building facade itself.

Another police officer who was guarding the Parliament on the opposite side of the square noticed the gunman, before he took out his personal weapon and fired at the attacker. Bezuk ran to the nearby street to take cover and reloaded his gun, he returned to fire on the police again, tearing through the police officer's trousers yet missing the second police officer's leg by a few millimeters, Bezuk was again suppressed by police fire, and eventually fled the scene. Bezuk was never hit by the police gunfire, however it was noted that suppressed return fire prevented Bezuk from advancing any further toward the government doors.

The wounded officer, Fiuri, ran approximately 50 metres (160 ft) and collapsed in a state of shock. He was helped by the bystanders, who called an ambulance. The wounded policeman was taken to Sisters of Charity Hospital in Zagreb, where he was treated for his wounds. Police then swarmed St. Mark Square looking for the attacker, but soon received the report of shots heard in the nearby Jabukovac Street, which turned out to be Bezuk taking his own life. In total Bezuk fired 16 shots during the shooting

== Perpetrator ==
Danijel Bezuk (April 16, 1998 – October 12, 2020) was born in the village of Kletište near Kutina and was the youngest of 3 brothers, 7 years before his birth his uncle had died in the Croatian War of Independence. During his childhood Bezuk trained at GNK Dinamo and was reported to have had modest grades during his school years, he attended the Mato Lovrak primary school in Kutina and a Vocational school in the same town. As a 13-year-old, he reportedly mocked the Serbian Krajina quasi-state, and posed with a makeshift wooden sniper rifle. Growing up with anti-establishment ideology, Bezuk listened to stories about the treasonous government while growing up. Bezuk reportedly had a hard time dealing with the lack of prosecution of corruption, as well as the trial of Croatian generals in The Hague.

Bezuk's acquaintances described him as "outwardly cheerful", but "simultaneously harbouring persistent anger over state corruption and its severe lack of persecution in the Croatian Government". Bezuk's closest friend stated that "He took care of the environment around him, he used to take his own trimmer and cleaned the children's playground, he went around the forest and collected other people's trash. He had no problems and never complained to me about anything." The same friend in question helped Bezuk land a job through their mutual connection, prior to his new job Bezuk worked as an apple picker in Germany, Bezuk also reportedly worked various jobs throughout his life, including various construction jobs across Croatia mostly concentrated in Rijeka and Krk. Shortly before the shooting, he was commuting early every morning to work for an installation company in Zagreb, Bezuk's co-workers noted that work was "stressing him out significantly". The day before the shooting Bezuk had slept in an unspecified hotel in central Zagreb, he didnt show up to his place of work and arrived to Banski Dvori by a taxi.

=== Motives ===
Soon after the attack, the Croatian media found out the attacker's identity and started publishing Bezuk's Facebook account, which featured written statuses, expressing his frustrations with the state of affairs in Croatia. The posts included a link to a YouTube video dedicated to snipers, captioned with: "I wish I was one of these guys, to take out Serbs". In another post, he described himself as "a tourist in his own country". In yet another post, he expressed his support for the Croatian Party of Rights' (HSP) and an early-1990s paramilitary wing, Croatian Defence Forces (HOS). In his last Facebook status before committing suicide, he wrote: "Enough with the frauds and ruthless trampling of human values without [any] responsibility". The Croatian Ministry of the Interior stated that “What we have managed to investigate so far does not show any indication that something like that would occur and the perpetrator did not have a criminal record".

In February 2021, Prime Minister Andrej Plenković stated that the motive of the attack was his party Croatian Democratic Union's (HDZ) coalition with the Independent Democratic Serb Party (SDSS).

== Reactions ==
Immediately after the Croatian media started writing about Bezuk's Facebook profile, thousands of people flooded Bezuk’s personal Facebook page before the account was ultimately taken down. Underneath his posts, an influx of users posted comments praising him, offering condolences, and framing his action as a reasonable response to political corruption and economic conditions in the country. Many comments referred to him as a "hero," empathized with his actions and posted condolences. In the immediate aftermath of the shooting, President Zoran Milanović held a press conference in which he called the government to protect the central state institutions, saying that "they are not a tourist destination". On the same day, police raided Bezuk's family home, where they apparently found two rifles with optical sights, silencers, and over 1,000 pieces of ammunition.

Bezuk's father was later arrested for illegally stockpiling weapons, however he was never directly linked for causing the attack. On 14 October, Prime Minister Plenković said that "[Croatia is] having a serious issue with radicalism" and that the attack had elements of terrorism, it was the first terrorist attack in Croatia since the 1995 Rijeka bombing. Plenković urged the Croatian police, State's Attorney Office of the Republic of Croatia and the Security and Intelligence Agency to investigate "how a young man could become so radicalized" also noting that, He appealed to the croatian public to "raise the level of respect, in order to build a public culture which will prevent similar incidents from happening", however Plenković never addressed how he will mitigate governmental corruption, which was the main motivator for the shooting. On 15 October 2020, Minister of Croatian Veterans Tomo Medved, while commenting the attack, pointed out that there was a "series of clues indicating that the Prime Minister himself was the attacker's target".

== Investigation ==
On 16 October, Croatian daily newspaper Jutarnji list, referring to the source from the police, published the article saying that prior to the attack Bezuk searched the internet for texts and photographs of government office location, building interior and regular movements of the President and the Prime Minister. The shooting was formally classified as an act of lone wolf terrorism by the Croatian Parliament and National Security Council.

The investigation was concluded on 22 July 2021. The State's Attorney Office rejected the criminal complaint against Bezuk since he was deceased, and reported that the investigation found no evidence that there were any accomplices or instigators to the attack. In September 2022, Jutarnji list wrote that Bezuk's final message before committing suicide was identical to paroles of radical Croatian right-wing group called Banovina Horosan which advocates spread of Islam and of Sharia law in Croatia.

== Closure of St. Mark's Square ==
Following the attack, the police fenced off St. Mark's Square, announcing an "emergency security plan" for the area. During the reconstruction of the Banski Dvori later that year, the square was temporarily re-opened to the public for walkthroughs. Several politicians have called on the Ministry of the Interior to reopen the square, in order to allow tourist and resident access to Zagreb's historic Upper Town.

Since 2020, the square has remained closed. St. Mark's Square was retrofitted with high-security fencing, barricades, and advanced surveillance after the incident. On 26 November 2020, St. Mark's Square was officially designated a "Category 1" guarded area due to its proximity to sensitive government infrastructure.

== See also ==
- 1995 Rijeka bombing
- 2019 Dallas Courthouse shooting
- 2022 Bratislava shooting
- List of terrorist incidents in 2020
- List of lone wolf terrorist attacks
