= British Square (Zagreb) =

Square in Zagreb, Croatia

- Britanski Trg; Britanac
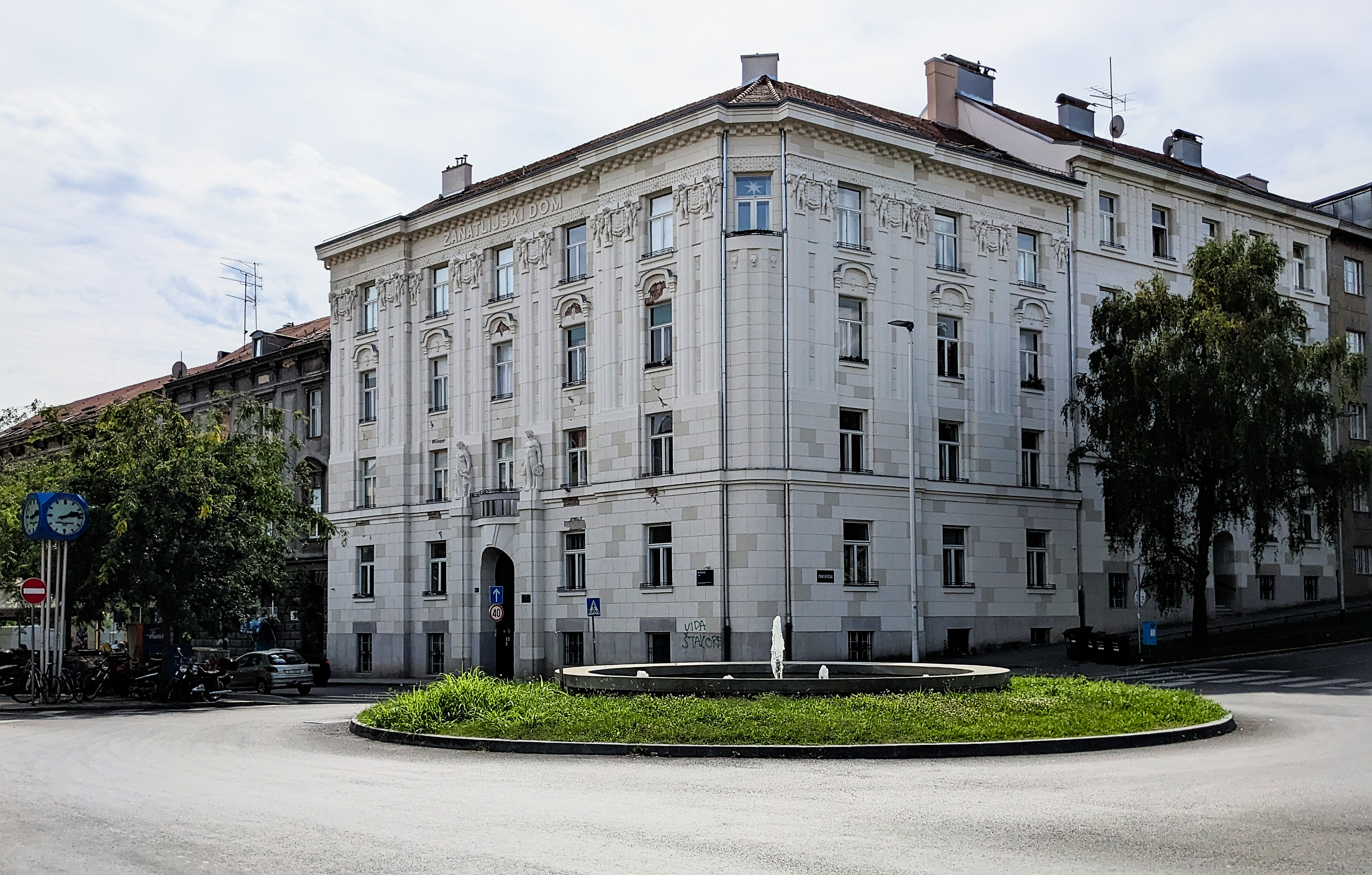
- Zanatlijski dom on the square
- Interactive map of British Square
- Native name: Britanski Trg (Croatian)
- Former names: Pejačevićev trg (1928. – 1946.); Ilički trg (do 1928.)
- Type: Square
- Coordinates: 45°48′47″N 15°57′53″E
- North: Pantovčak
- East: Ilica Street
- South: Kačićeva Street
- West: Ilica Street

British Square (Croatian: Britanski trg), colloquially known as Britanac (lit. 'the Brit'), is a public square in the city of Zagreb, Croatia. It is one of the few remaining squares to include an open-air farmers' marketplace with fresh fruit, vegetables and other foods brought directly from farms, and is a revered urban area among the population of Zagreb. Britanski trg is located along Ilica Street, a few blocks west from the main city square, Ban Jelačić Square. It is also a transport hub—it is an endpoint for several bus lines, while the city tram lines 1, 6 and 11 stop on its south side. The square itself is convenient for access to several elite upscale neighborhoods of Zagreb, such as Pantovčak and Zelengaj. The open air market is held daily from early morning until about noon, and an antiques fair is held at the square each Sunday.
