= Pantovčak =

Neighbourhood of Zagreb, Croatia

Coordinates: 45°49′37″N 15°57′32″E

- Interactive map of Pantovčak

Pantovčak (pronounced [pantɔʋˈtʃaːk]) is a neighborhood in Zagreb, Croatia. Its formal location is the Gornji Grad - Medveščak city district. The Pantovčak street runs from the Britanski trg (British Square) near Ilica towards Medvednica, ending at Šestinski vijenac (Šestine roundabout). The neighbourhood is officially referred to as "Dr. Stjepan Radić" and it has a population of 4,957 (2011).

Pantovčak is best known as the location of the Croatian Presidential Palace and the adjacent park, located at Pantovčak 241. In Croatian, "Pantovčak" is often used as a metonym for the office of the President of Croatia.
