= Presidential Palace, Zagreb =

Official workplace of the President of Croatia

Presidential Palace
- Predsjednički dvori
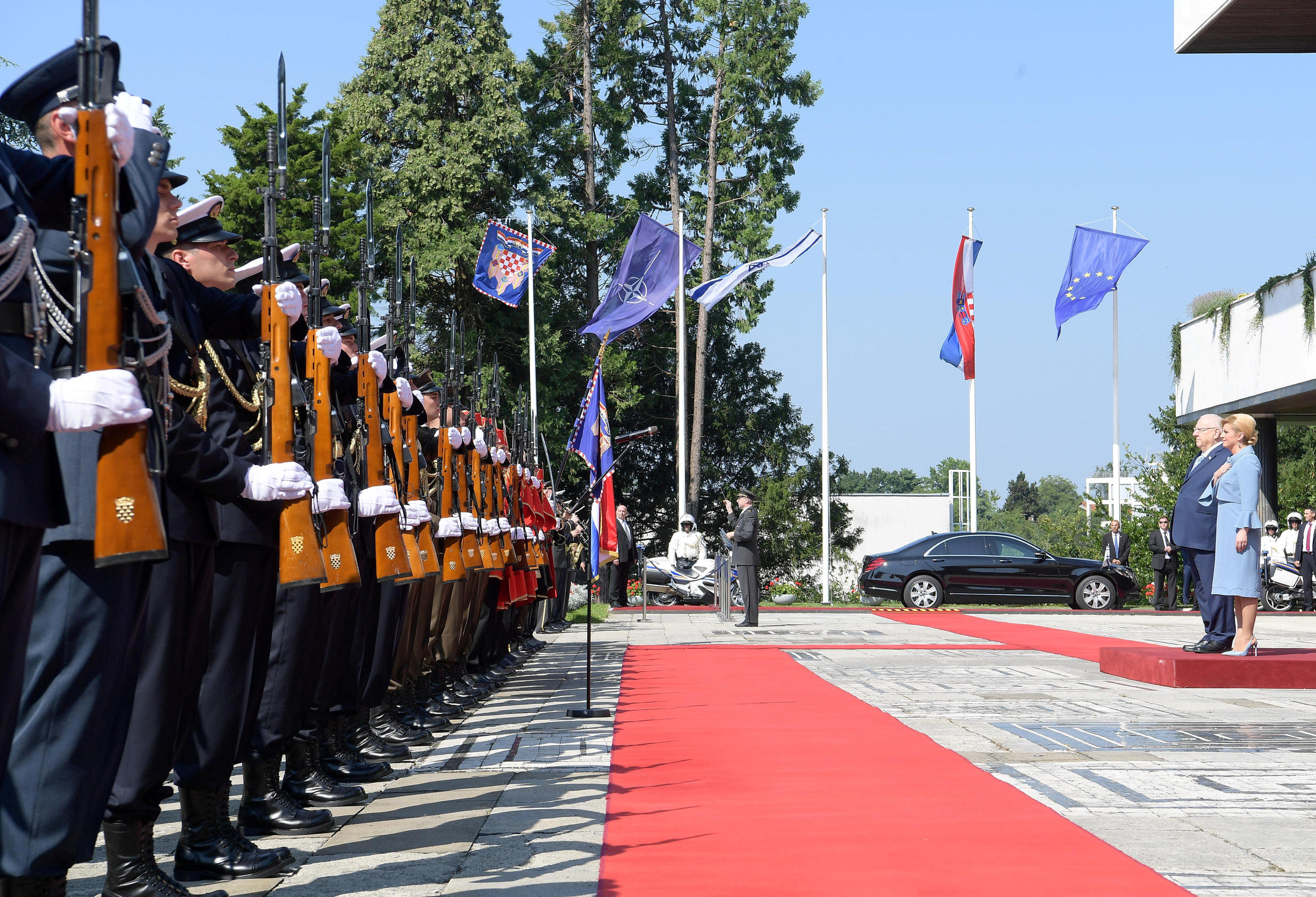
- Croatian President Kolinda Grabar-Kitarović and President of Israel Reuven Rivlin saluting an Honor Guard Battalion in front of the palace, 2018.
- Interactive map of the Presidential Palace area
- Former names: Vila Zagorje
- Alternative names: Pantovčak

General information
- Location: Pantovčak 241, Zagreb, Croatia
- Coordinates: 45°50′16″N 15°57′28″E
- Current tenants: President of Croatia
- Construction started: 1963
- Completed: 1964
- Cost: 54 million HRK (c. €7.3 million)
- Owner: Republic of Croatia

Technical details
- Floor area: 3,700 m^{2} (40,000 sq ft)

Design and construction
- Architects: Vjenceslav Richter; Kazimir Ostrogović

The Presidential Palace (Croatian: Predsjednički dvori), also referred to by the metonym Pantovčak, is the official workplace of the president of Croatia since late 1991, situated in Pantovčak, Zagreb. However, the president does not reside in the building and it is instead used to house the Office of the President, while the president continues to reside in his or her private residence during the duration of their term of office.

Even so, welcoming ceremonies for visiting foreign dignitaries, state functions commemorating national holidays, and consultations with leaders of parliamentary parties during post-election government formation processes, among others, are all usually held at the palace. Furthermore, it has become somewhat customary for the outgoing president and the president-elect to hold a bilateral meeting and a joint press conference in the palace on the former's last day in office, before his or her final departure from the palace grounds and the beginning of the latter's term of office at midnight.

The structure covers 3,700 square metres (40,000 square feet) and in the 2009 government budget, it was allocated 54 million kuna (c. 7.3 million euro). As of May 2008, the office employed 170 staff with the maximum staffing level set at 191 by the Regulation on Internal Organisation of the Office of the President of Croatia.

== History ==
The building, formerly known as Villa Zagorje or Tito's Villa, was designed by architects Vjenceslav Richter and Kazimir Ostrogović and completed in 1964 for the former Yugoslav president Josip Broz Tito. It has been used as an official workplace (and formerly an official residence) since President Franjo Tuđman moved there following the October 1991 bombing of Banski dvori, the official presidential residence up to that point. In addition to the original building, there is also a 3,500 square metres (38,000 square feet) annex built in 1993, an ancillary structure housing office security services and a bomb shelter predating the 1990s.

== Pantovčak forest ==
The forest and park surrounding the palace are inhabited by numerous types of animals, ranging from species native to parts of Croatia (fallow deer, red deer, foxes, various bats, squirrels, peregrine falcons, stock doves, European tree frogs, European pond turtles) to those originating from more distant parts of the world (bighorn sheep, peacocks). Of the species present on the complex grounds some are categorized as endangered.

In early 2018 President Kolinda Grabar-Kitarović announced plans to hand over a majority of the forest, currently a restricted area, to the Government of Croatia so that it may be turned into a forest park which would be freely accessible to the public.

== In popular culture ==
The then-Vila Zagorje was featured in the 1991 British comedy film The Pope Must Die, as the residence of fictional mafia boss Vittorio Corelli.

== Gallery ==
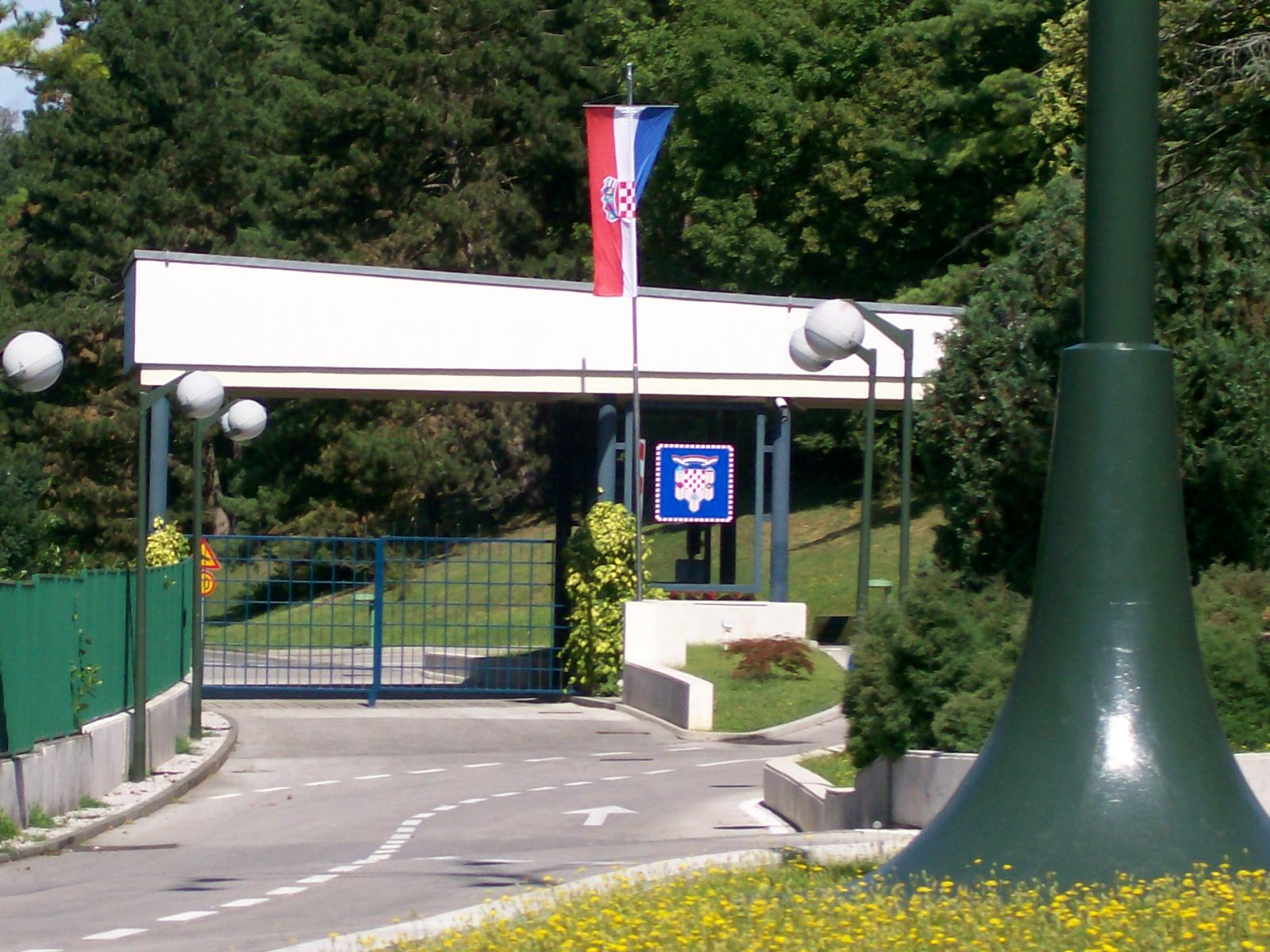
Main entrance to Presidential Palace compound.

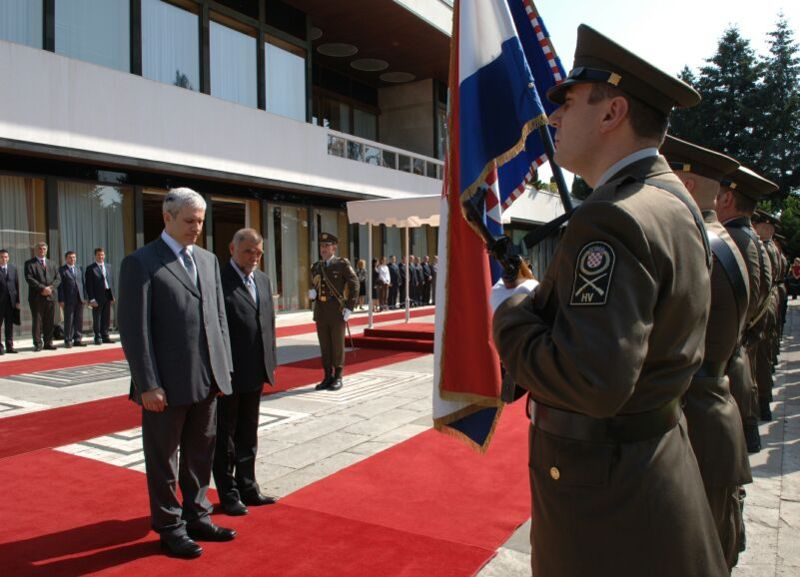
President Stjepan Mesić and President of Serbia Boris Tadić saluting an Honor Guard Battalion in front of the palace, 2007.

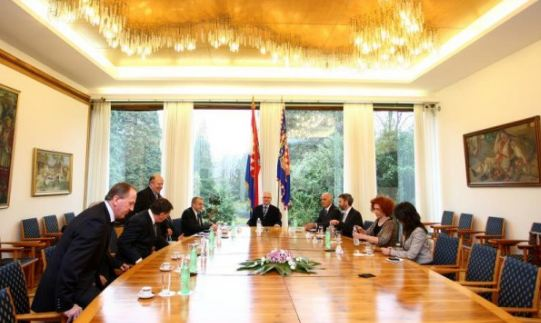
President Josipović chairing a meeting in the North Salon.

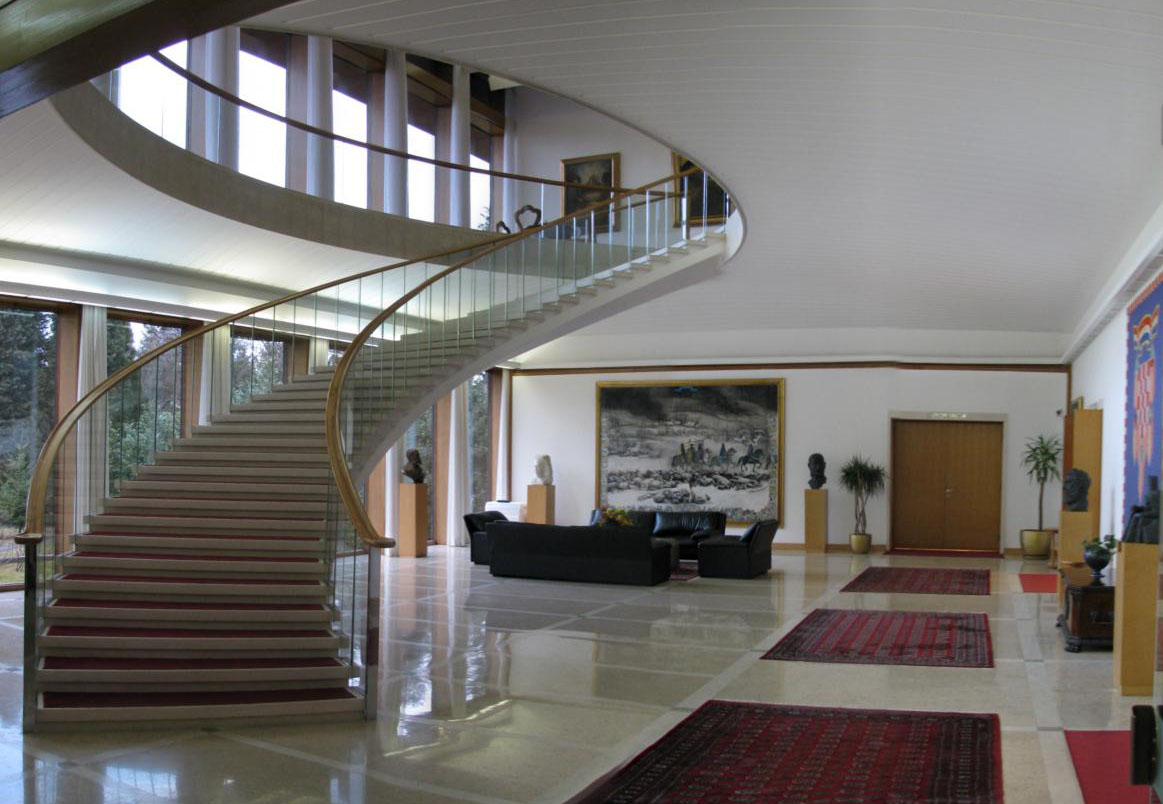
The lobby of the palace and its iconic staircase.

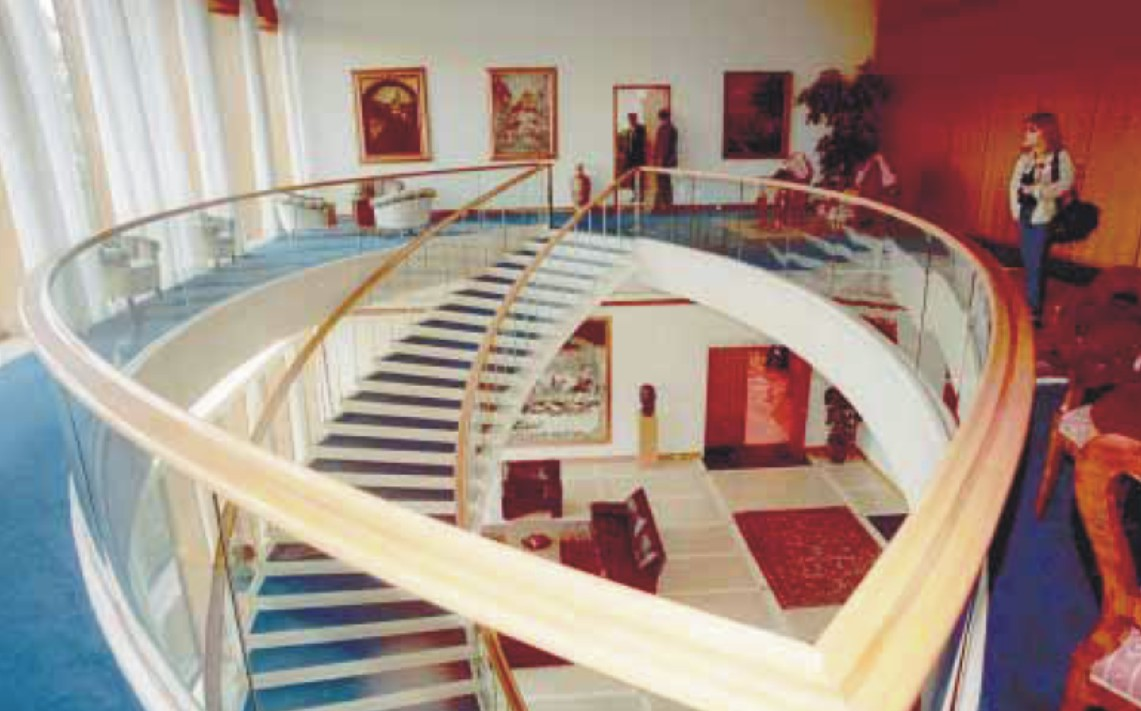
The first floor of the lobby during the Tuđman presidency, 1995.

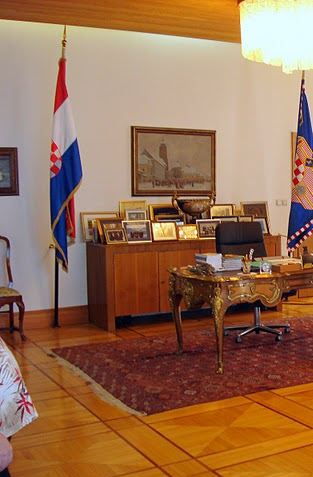
Office of the President during the presidency of Ivo Josipović, 2010.
