= Bosniaks of Croatia =

Bošnjaci u Hrvatskoj
- Ethnic flag of Bosniaks in Croatia

Total population
- 24,131 (2021)

Languages
- Bosnian and Croatian

Religion
- Predominantly Sunni Islam

Related ethnic groups
- Other Slavic peoples, especially South Slavs

Bosniaks of Croatia (Bosnian and Croatian: Bošnjaci u Hrvatskoj) are one of the ethnic minorities of the Republic of Croatia. According to the 2021 Croatian census, there were 24,131 Bosniaks, or 0.62% of the total population, making them the third largest ethnic group in the country after Croats and Serbs.

Bosniaks are officially recognized as an autochthonous national minority, and as such, they elect a special representative to the Croatian Parliament, shared with members of four other national minorities. Most Bosniaks live in the capital Zagreb (8,119), Istria County (6,146) and Primorje-Gorski Kotar County (4,877). There is a Bosniak community in Maljevac, hence the mosque in the village.

== Religion ==
Bosniaks of Croatia are predominantly Muslims, with 21,119 (87.52) subscribing to this confession according to the 2021 Croatian census. They're followed by 1,113 (4.61%) Bosniaks who declared as atheists or non-religious and 367 (1.52%) declared as agnostics. There were 981 (4.07%) Bosniaks of undisclosed or unknown confession, while the rest belonged to various Christian denominations or other religions.

== Politics ==
Bosniaks are officially recognised as an autochthonous national minority, and as such, they have elected, together with Albanians, Montenegrins, Macedonians and Slovenes, one representative to the Croatian Parliament since 2003.

Election	Representative	Party	Nationality	Term
2003	Šemso Tanković	SDAH	Bosniak	2003–2011
2007	Šemso Tanković	SDAH	Bosniak	2003–2011
2011	Nedžad Hodžić	BDSH	Bosniak	2011–2015
2015	Ermina Lekaj Prljaskaj	Independent	Albanian	2015–2024
2016	Ermina Lekaj Prljaskaj	Independent	Albanian	2015–2024
2020	Ermina Lekaj Prljaskaj	Independent	Albanian	2015–2024
2024	Armin Hodžić	Bošnjaci zajedno!	Bosniak	2024–

== See also ==
- Bosnia and Herzegovina–Croatia relations
- Bosniak diaspora
- Ethnic groups in Croatia
- Croats of Bosnia and Herzegovina
