= List of cabinets of Croatia =

This is a list of cabinets of Croatian government, the chief executive body of the Republic of Croatia.

Note that between 1990 and 2000 Croatia had a semi-presidential system and members of government, including prime ministers, were all directly appointed and removed by the president of Croatia, this post being held by Franjo Tuđman from 1990 to late 1999. During his two terms as president, Tuđman was also the chairman of the ruling conservative Croatian Democratic Union (HDZ), with all prime ministers in this period also coming from his party's ranks.

Following Tuđman's death in December 1999 and the subsequent January 2000 general election, the new centre-left parliamentary majority led by Ivica Račan amended the Constitution of Croatia in November 2000 and introduced a parliamentary system, greatly reducing the president's executive powers. Therefore, prime ministers since Račan have usually been the leaders of parties (or coalition of parties) which held a parliament majority according to results of the general election. Meanwhile, the position of president of the Republic was made into a non-party post, which meant that presidents who served after Tuđman (Stjepan Mesić from 2000 to 2010, Ivo Josipović from 2010 to 2015, Kolinda Grabar-Kitarović from 2015 to 2020 and Zoran Milanović since 2020) "froze" or resigned their party memberships upon getting elected or taking office for the entire duration of their five-year terms.

There have been 12 prime ministers since the introduction of a multi-party system via the 1990 general election and 15 governments headed by them. Since independence in June 1991, however, there have been 11 prime ministers and 14 governments (beginning with that of Josip Manolić).

Nine prime ministers were members of the HDZ during their term in office, two were members of the SDP and one was not a member of any political party. To date two prime ministers (Ivica Račan and Ivo Sanader) have chaired more than one government.

The longest serving prime ministers to date have been Ivo Sanader, who held the post for 2,022 days between December 2003 and July 2009, followed by Zoran Milanović (1637 days from December 2011 until January 2016), Zlatko Mateša (1,542 days from November 1995 to January 2000) and Ivica Račan (1,426 days from January 2000 to December 2003). The shortest serving prime minister was Stjepan Mesić (86 days from May to August 1990).

To date the only prime minister to have been voted out of office by a motion of no confidence is Tihomir Orešković, on 16 June 2016. He also has the distinction of being the first non-partisan prime minister.

== Cabinets of Croatia ==
No.	Cabinet	Term start	Term end	Days	Prime Minister	Coalition parties
1	Mesić	30 May 1990	24 August 1990	86	Stjepan Mesić	HDZ
2	Manolić	24 August 1990	17 July 1991	327	Josip Manolić	HDZ
3	Gregurić	17 July 1991	12 August 1992	392	Franjo Gregurić	HDZ – SDP – HSLS – HKDS – HNS – SSH – HDS
4	Šarinić	12 August 1992	3 April 1993	234	Hrvoje Šarinić	HDZ
5	Valentić	3 April 1993	7 November 1995	948	Nikica Valentić	HDZ
6	Mateša	7 November 1995	27 January 2000	1,542	Zlatko Mateša	HDZ
7	Račan I	27 January 2000	30 July 2002	915	Ivica Račan	SDP – HSLS – HNS – HSS – IDS – LS
8	Račan II	30 July 2002	23 December 2003	511	Ivica Račan	SDP – HNS – HSS – LS – LIBRA
9	Sanader I	23 December 2003	12 January 2008	1,481	Ivo Sanader	HDZ – DC (supported by HSLS, HSS, SDSS)
10	Sanader II	12 January 2008	6 July 2009	541	Ivo Sanader	HDZ – HSLS – HSS – SDSS
11	Kosor	6 July 2009	23 December 2011	900	Jadranka Kosor	HDZ – HSLS – HSS – SDSS
12	Milanović	23 December 2011	22 January 2016	1,491	Zoran Milanović	Kukuriku Coalition; SDP – HNS – IDS (supported by HSU (formally in Kukuriku Coalition) and SDSS)
13	Orešković	22 January 2016	19 October 2016	271	Tihomir Orešković	Patriotic Coalition (HDZ – HSP-AS – HSLS – HSS – HRAST – HDS – ZDS – BUZ) – MOST
14	Plenković I	19 October 2016	23 July 2020	1,373	Andrej Plenković	From October 2016 until April 2017: HDZ - MOST (supported by SDSS, HDS, HSLS, NS-R, BM365, HRAST, SMSH, HDSSB and HSS (formally in opposition)) April to June 2017: HDZ (supported by SDSS, HDS, HSLS, NS-R, HRAST, SMSH and HDSSB) June 2017 until July 2020: HDZ - HNS (supported by SDSS, HDS, HSLS, NS-R, HRAST, SMSH and HDSSB)
15	Plenković II	23 July 2020	17 May 2024	1,394	Andrej Plenković	HDZ - SDSS (supported by HSLS, HDS, HDSSB, HNS and NS-R)
16	Plenković III	17 May 2024	Incumbent	314	Andrej Plenković	HDZ - DP (supported by HSLS, HDS, HSU and HNS)

== See also ==
- Prime Minister of Croatia
  - List of prime ministers of Croatia by time in office
- President of Croatia
  - List of presidents of Croatia
- Government of the Socialist Republic of Croatia
- Speaker of the Croatian Parliament
- Speaker of the Chamber of Counties of Croatia

== Sources ==
- Chronology of Croatian governments at the Croatian Information-Documentation Referral Agency. (in Croatian)
- "Prethodne Vlade RH" [Former Governments of the Republic of Croatia] (in Croatian). Croatian Government. Archived from the original on 2011-11-23.
