= Armin Hodžić =

Armin Hodžić may refer to:

- Armin Hodžić (footballer, born 1994), Bosnian footballer
- Armin Hodžić (footballer, born 2000), Bosnian footballer
- Armin Hodžić (politician), Bosniak-Croatian politician
