= Bošnjaci zajedno! =

Bosniaks Together! – National Coordination of Bosniaks in Croatia Bošnjaci zajedno! – Nacionalna koordinacija Bošnjaka u Hrvatskoj
- President: Bermin Meškić
- Chairperson: Armin Hodžić
- Founder: Armin Hodžić
- Founded: 23 February 2023; 3 years ago
- Headquarters: Gajeva 7, Zagreb
- Ideology: Bosniak minority interests
- Political position: Big-tent
- Colours: Blue
- Sabor (Minority Seats): 1 / 8
- European Parliament: 0 / 12

Website
- bosnjaci-zajedno.hr

Bosniaks Together! – National Coordination of Bosniaks in Croatia (Croatian: Bošnjaci zajedno! – Nacionalna koordinacija Bošnjaka u Hrvatskoj) is a big-tent political party representing the Bosniak minority in Croatia.

The party was founded to support the candidacy of Armin Hodžić in the 2024 Croatian parliamentary election. Rather than competing as separate parties in the election, nearly all Bosniak groups collaborated in the effort to elect a member of Parliament.

The party is currently led by President of the Bosniak National Council and Member-elect of the Croatian-Parliament, Armin Hodžić. Meanwhile, the party's president is Bermin Meškić.

== Activities ==
The party nominated Armin Hodžić for the 12th Minority District in which members of the Albanian, Bosniak, Montenegrin, Macedonian and Slovenian national minorities elect a common representative for the 2024 Croatian Parliamentary election. Hodžić defeated Ermina Lekaj Prljaskaj of the Union of Albanians by a margin of 47–32. Independent candidate Šoip Šoipi received nearly 20% of the vote.
