= List of presidents of Croatia =

This is a list of heads of state of the Republic of Croatia, since the independence of Croatia.

Historically, the republican system was introduced in the Socialist Republic of Croatia while it was a constituent republic of the SFR Yugoslavia, and its head of state is discussed in the history of politics of the Socialist Republic of Croatia.

Since 1990, the President of the Republic of Croatia (Predsjednik) is directly elected to a five-year term and is limited to a maximum of two terms. However, with the Constitution of 2001, the powers of the President (much expanded in 1990) were now again severely curtailed, as Croatia shifted from a semi-presidential system, to an incomplete parliamentary system. As in most parliamentary systems, the President is now by-and-large a ceremonial office, with the Prime Minister de facto heading the executive branch.

== Presidents of the Republic of Croatia (1990–present) ==
On 30 May 1990 Franjo Tuđman was elected by Parliament as the President of the Presidency of the Socialist Republic of Croatia, then still a constituent republic of the Socialist Federal Republic of Yugoslavia, and held office together with several Vice Presidents of the Presidency of SR Croatia. The collective presidency was reduced to seven members on 25 July 1990 and the name of the constituent Yugoslav republic was changed to the Republic of Croatia by removing the word Socialist from its name and the names of its institutions. The collective presidency was abolished in favor of the post of President of the Republic of Croatia with the adoption of a new constitution on 22 December 1990. The Croatian Parliament then declared independence on 25 June 1991, when Tuđman formally became the first president of an independent Croatian nation under the name the Republic of Croatia.

(*)The constitutional amendments of November 2000 abandoned a semi-presidential system for a parliamentary system (with a directly elected president) and also made the presidency a non-partisan office, meaning that even if they are elected to office as a candidate of a particular political party, the president must resign membership in that party before taking office.

Croatian Democratic Union (2)

Social Democratic Party of Croatia (2)

Croatian People's Party – Liberal Democrats (1)

No.	Picture	Name (birth–death)	Term of office			Election	Political party
No.	Picture	Name (birth–death)	No.	Term start	Term end	Election	Political party
1	Franjo Tuđman	Franjo Tuđman (1922–1999)	—	30 May 1990	12 August 1992	—	Croatian Democratic Union
1	Franjo Tuđman	Franjo Tuđman (1922–1999)	1	12 August 1992	11 August 1997	1992 (56.73%)	Croatian Democratic Union
1	Franjo Tuđman	Franjo Tuđman (1922–1999)	2	12 August 1997	10 December 1999 †	1997 (61.41%)	Croatian Democratic Union
1	Franjo Tuđman	Franjo Tuđman (1922–1999)	Parliament elected him the President of the Presidency of SR Croatia in May 1990, but with the adoption of a new constitution on 22 December 1990, the title of the office was changed to President of the Republic of Croatia and the Presidium of Croatia (Presidency) was abolished. Tuđman presided over the period when Croatia gained independence and ultimately joined the United Nations in May 1992. Tuđman won re-election to a de facto second and third term in 1992 and 1997, winning election outright both times without the need for a run-off. He is the only president to have been elected in the first round of elections. He died in office in December 1999.				Croatian Democratic Union
—	Vlatko Pavletić	Vlatko Pavletić (1930–2007)	—	10 December 1999	2 February 2000	Acting President	Croatian Democratic Union
—	Vlatko Pavletić	Vlatko Pavletić (1930–2007)	Tuđman was incapacitated since 26 November 1999 and died on 10 December 1999. Pavletić became acting president as Speaker of the Croatian Parliament. He was succeeded by Zlatko Tomčić when the 4th Assembly of Parliament was replaced by the 5th Assembly after the 2000 election.				
—	Zlatko Tomčić	Zlatko Tomčić (1945–)	—	2 February 2000	18 February 2000	Acting President	Croatian Peasant Party
—	Zlatko Tomčić	Zlatko Tomčić (1945–)	Became acting president as Speaker of Parliament when the 4th Assembly of Parliament (1995-2000) was replaced by the 5th Assembly (2000–2003). Served until Stjepan Mesić was sworn in as the new president on 18 February 2000.				
2	Stjepan Mesić	Stjepan Mesić (1934–)	3	19 February 2000	18 February 2005	2000 (56.01%)	Croatian People's Party – Liberal Democrats* (formally independent)
2	Stjepan Mesić	Stjepan Mesić (1934–)	4	19 February 2005	18 February 2010	2005 (65.93%)	Croatian People's Party – Liberal Democrats* (formally independent)
2	Stjepan Mesić	Stjepan Mesić (1934–)	He defeated Dražen Budiša in the 2000 presidential elections. He was the first president with reduced powers, as the semi-presidential system was replaced by an incomplete parliamentary system in November 2000. Mesić was re-elected in 2005, defeating Jadranka Kosor in a landslide.				
3	Ivo Josipović	Ivo Josipović (1957–)	5	19 February 2010	18 February 2015	2009–10 (60.26%)	Social Democratic Party* (formally independent)
3	Ivo Josipović	Ivo Josipović (1957–)	He defeated Milan Bandić by a wide margin in the 2010 election. He was narrowly defeated by Kolinda Grabar-Kitarović in his re-election bid in 2015.				
4	Kolinda Grabar-Kitarović	Kolinda Grabar-Kitarović (1968–)	6	19 February 2015	18 February 2020	2014–15 (50.74%)	Croatian Democratic Union* (formally independent)
4	Kolinda Grabar-Kitarović	Kolinda Grabar-Kitarović (1968–)	She defeated incumbent president Ivo Josipović in the second round of the 2015 election. She is the first female president since independence and also the youngest, aged 46. She was defeated by Zoran Milanović in her reelection bid in 2020.				
5	Zoran Milanović	Zoran Milanović (1966–)	7	19 February 2020	18 February 2025	2019–20 (52.66%)	Social Democratic Party* (formally independent)
5	Zoran Milanović	Zoran Milanović (1966–)	8	19 February 2025	Incumbent	2024–25 (74.68%)	Social Democratic Party* (formally independent)
5	Zoran Milanović	Zoran Milanović (1966–)	Milanović defeated incumbent president Kolinda Grabar-Kitarović in the second round of the 2020 election. He was re-elected in 2025, defeating Dragan Primorac in a landslide. Milanović became the first president to win a second term since Stjepan Mesić in 2005.				

A – Acting President
(**) From the abolishment of the collective Presidency of the Republic of Croatia on 22 December 1990

== See also ==
- Speaker of the Croatian Parliament
- Prime Minister of Croatia
  - List of prime ministers of Croatia by time in office
- List of cabinets of Croatia
- Speaker of the Chamber of Counties of Croatia
- President of the League of Communists of Croatia
- List of heads of state of the Socialist Republic of Croatia
- List of heads of state of Yugoslavia
- Prime Minister of Yugoslavia
