= Armin Hodžić (politician) =

Bosniak-Croatian politician

Member of the Croatian Parliament for the 12th constituency
- Incumbent
- Assumed office 16 May 2024
- Preceded by: Ermina Lekaj Prljaskaj

Personal details
- Born: Armin Hodžić; 10 February 1996 (age 30) Zagreb, Croatia
- Party: Bošnjaci zajedno!
- Other political affiliations: Party of Democratic Action of Croatia; Independent
- Spouse: Anisa Hodžić

Armin Hodžić (born 10 February 1996) is a Croatian-Bosniak politician who is currently a member-elect of the Croatian Sabor from the 12th electoral district after having defeated incumbent Ermina Lekaj Prljaskaj in the 2024 Croatian parliamentary election. A member of the Bošnjaci zajedno! party, Hodžić had briefly served as Chairman of the Party of Democratic Action of Croatia and ran as an independent candidate in the 2020 Parliamentary elections.

Before his parliament election, Hodžić was President of the Bosniak National Council in Zagreb. He has also proposed Bosniaks and Croatian-Muslims being counted as their electoral district.
