= Speaker of the Chamber of Counties of Croatia =

Speaker of the Chamber of Counties of the Croatian Parliament
- Predsjednik Županijskog doma Hrvatskog sabora
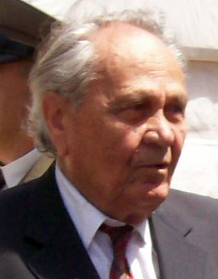
- Josip Manolić
- Style: Mister/Madam Speaker
- Appointer: Chamber of Counties of the Croatian Parliament
- Term length: Four years
- Formation: 22 March 1993
- First holder: Vinko Nikolić (as Acting Speaker); Josip Manolić (as Speaker)
- Final holder: Katica Ivanišević
- Abolished: 28 March 2001

The Speaker of the Chamber of Counties (Croatian: Predsjednik Županijskog doma Hrvatskog sabora, literally the President of the Chamber of Counties of the Croatian Parliament) was the presiding officer of the Chamber of Counties, the upper chamber of the Croatian Parliament from 22 March 1993 until its abolition by constitution changes on 28 March 2001.

The Speaker of the Chamber of Counties was elected by a majority of the chamber's members for the duration of the parliamentary term. In the event of a dissolution of the chamber, the speaker would continue to serve until the inauguration of his or her successor. Only two individuals held the office of Speaker of the Chamber of Counties during its eight-year existence: Josip Manolić (1993–1994) and Katica Ivanišević (1994–2001). Katica Ivanišević remains the only woman to have served as Speaker of either chamber of Croatian Parliament. The office became defunct upon the passing of constitutional amendments by which the Chamber of Counties was abolished and the bicameral Croatian Parliament was replaced by a unicameral parliamentary system. The lower chamber, formally known as the Chamber of Representatives (Croatian: Zastupnički dom) thus became the only parliamentary chamber and became known simply as the Croatian Parliament.

== List of speakers of the Chamber of Counties ==
No.	Portrait	Name (birth–death)	Term of office		Party
—		Vinko Nikolić (1912–1997); Acting Speaker	22 March 1993		Croatian Democratic Union
1		Josip Manolić (1920–2024)	22 March 1993	23 May 1994	Croatian Democratic Union
—		Damir Zorić (1960–); Deputy Speaker	23 May 1994		Croatian Social Liberal Party
2		Katica Ivanišević (1935–2024)	23 May 1994	12 May 1997	Croatian Democratic Union
—		Zvonimir Červenko (1926–2001); Acting Speaker	12 May 1997		Croatian Democratic Union
2		Katica Ivanišević (1935–2024)	12 May 1997	28 March 2001	Croatian Democratic Union

== Statistics ==
#	Speaker	Date of birth	Age at ascension	Time in office	Age at retirement	Date of death	Longevity
1	Josip Manolić	March 22, 1920	73 years, 0 days	1 year, 62 days	74 years, 61 days	April 15, 2024	104 years, 24 days
2	Katica Ivanišević	January 11, 1935	59 years, 132 days	6 years, 309 days	66 years, 76 days	July 17, 2024	89 years, 188 days

== See also ==
- President of Croatia
- List of presidents of Croatia
- Prime Minister of Croatia
  - List of prime ministers of Croatia by time in office
- Croatian Parliament#Chamber of Counties
- Speaker of the Croatian Parliament
