= Katica Ivanišević =

Croatian university professor and politician (1935–2024)

Speaker of the Chamber of Counties of the Croatian Parliament
- In office 12 May 1997 – 28 March 2001
- President: Franjo Tuđman; Vlatko Pavletić (acting); Zlatko Tomčić (acting); Stjepan Mesić
- Preceded by: Zvonimir Červenko (as Acting Speaker); Herself (as Speaker)
- Succeeded by: Position abolished
- In office 23 May 1994 – 12 May 1997
- President: Franjo Tuđman
- Preceded by: Damir Zorić (as Deputy Speaker); Josip Manolić (as Speaker)
- Succeeded by: Zvonimir Červenko (as Acting Speaker); Herself (as Speaker)

Personal details
- Born: 11 January 1935 Omišalj, Kingdom of Yugoslavia (modern Croatia)
- Died: 17 July 2024 (aged 89) Rijeka, Croatia

Katica Ivanišević (11 January 1935 – 17 July 2024) was a Croatian university professor and politician who served as the 2nd Speaker of the Chamber of Counties of Croatia, formerly the upper house of the Croatian Parliament, from 1994 until the chamber's abolition by constitutional changes in 2001. She was the first and to date only woman to serve as parliamentary speaker in an independent Croatia.

She graduated from the Faculty of Arts in Ljubljana and also studied at King's College London and at the Facolta per gli stranieri in Perugia. In 1977, she received a Master's degree in American literature from the Faculty of Arts in Ljubljana, and defended her doctoral dissertation entitled Classical Bohemia and the Beat Generation and its Reflection in the Literary Works of Their Members in 1981.

At the Faculty of Education in Rijeka, she held the positions of vice-dean, head of the Philology Department and dean. This was followed by holding the position of vice-rector of the University of Rijeka for two terms, and then rector. She was the first woman rector in Croatia. During her term as rector, she also chaired the Chamber of Counties of the Croatian Parliament. She retired in April 2001.

She has received numerous awards, including the City of Rijeka Award (1985), the Lifetime Achievement Award of the Municipality of Omišalj (2007), and she has also been awarded the highest state decorations: the Order of Prince Trpimir, the Order of the Croatian Dawn, the Order of Ante Starčević and the Homeland War Memorial.

She died on 17 July 2024, at the age of 89.
