= List of prime ministers of Croatia by time in office =

This is a list of prime ministers of Croatia since the first multi-party elections in 1990. These Prime Ministers served within the Socialist Republic of Croatia, a constituent republic of Yugoslavia, and after independence in 1991, the Republic of Croatia. The Prime Ministers are ranked by the length of their combined terms in office.

== Prime ministers ==
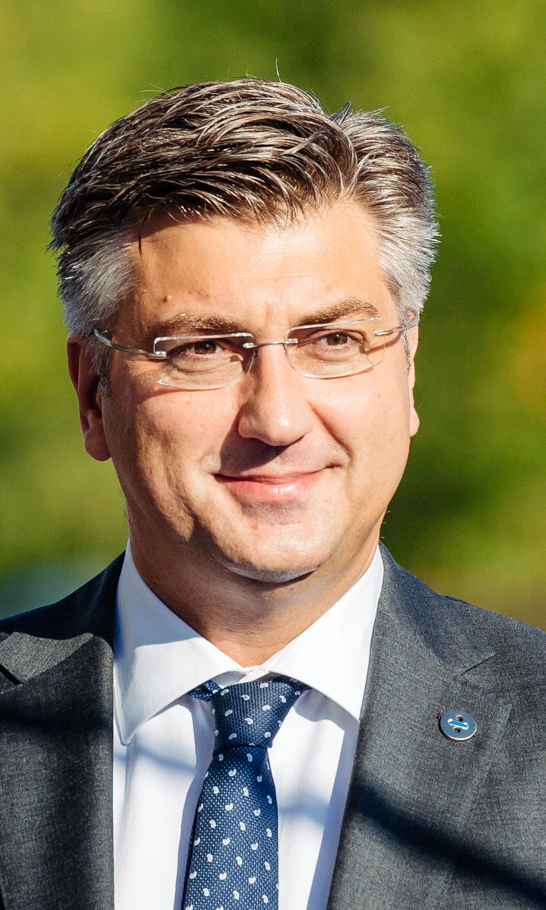
Andrej Plenković is Croatia's incumbent prime minister and the longest-serving holder of the office – at 9 years, 168 days or 3455 days.

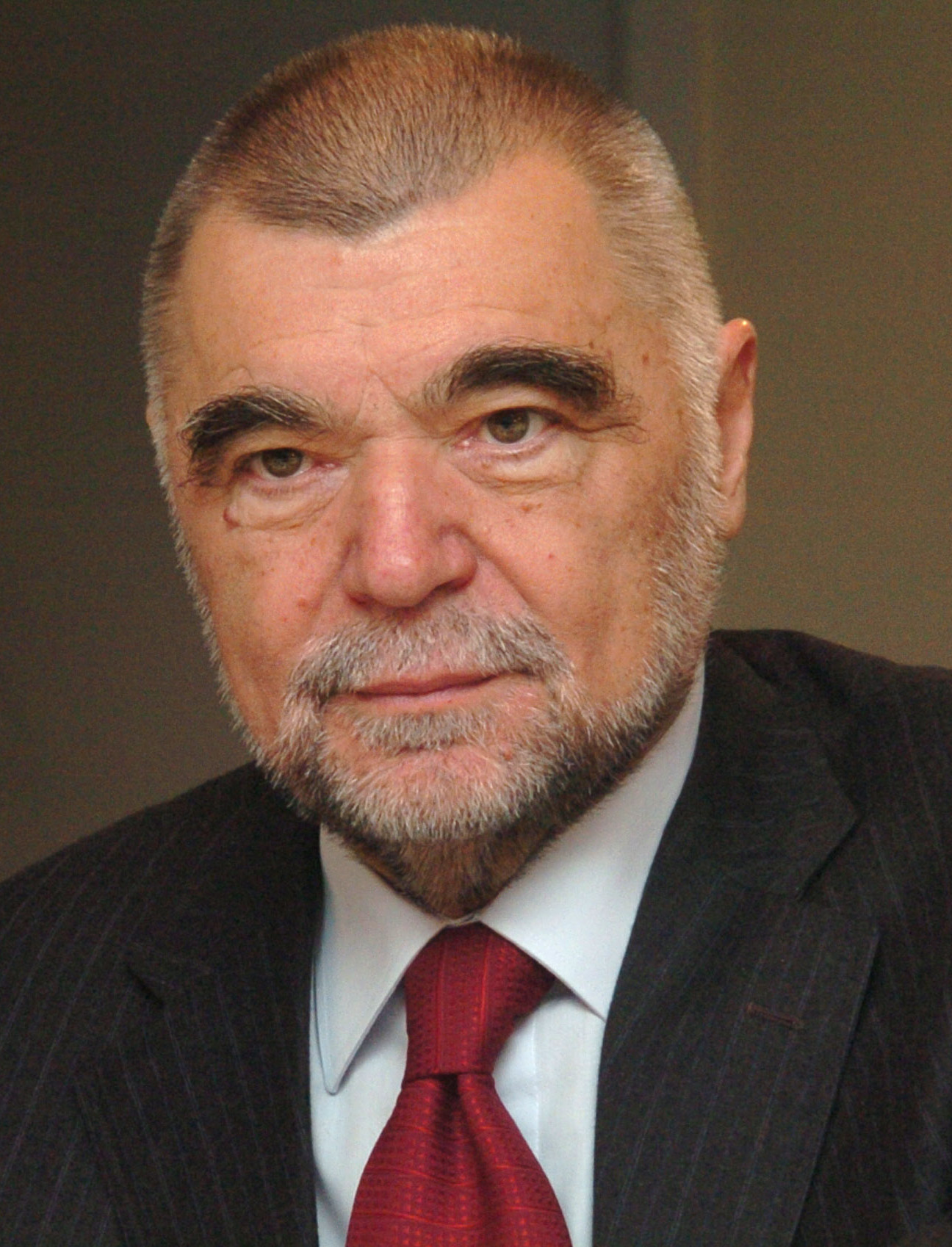
Stjepan Mesić is Croatia's shortest-serving Prime Minister – at 86 days.

Political parties: Croatian Democratic Union Social Democratic Party Independent

	Prime Minister	Incumbency	Years in power	Number of mandates	Notes
1	Andrej Plenković (incumbent)	9 years, 168 days	2016–present	3 minority	Plenković served two full terms and is serving a third term. He has headed three cabinets, with all three of them being minority coalition governments (2016–2020, 2020-2024 and since 2024). Plenković is the longest-serving prime minister of Croatia.
2	Ivo Sanader	5 years, 195 days	2003–2009	2 minority & 1 majority	Sanader served one full term at the head of a minority government and one short term as the head of a majority government. He resigned during his second term. Jadranka Kosor served out the remainder of his second term.
3	Zlatko Mateša	4 years, 81 days	1995–2000	1 majority	Mateša served one full term. His cabinet has the single longest duration of any Croatian government since first multi-party elections in 1990.
4	Zoran Milanović	4 years, 30 days	2011–2016	1 majority	Milanović served one full term heading a majority coalition government.
5	Ivica Račan	3 years, 330 days	2000–2003	2 majority	Račan served one full term. He headed two cabinets: at first a six-party majority coalition (2000–2002) and then a five-party majority coalition (2002–2003).
6	Nikica Valentić	2 years, 218 days	1993–1995	none	Valentić served out the term of Hrvoje Šarinić. He never won an election in his own right.
7	Jadranka Kosor	2 years, 170 days	2009–2011	none	Jadranka Kosor served out the remainder of Ivo Sanader's second term. She never won an election in her own right.
8	Franjo Gregurić	1 year, 26 days	1991–1992	none	Gregurić was the second of two prime ministers to serve out the term of Stjepan Mesić. He headed a National Unity Government at the beginning of the Croatian War of Independence and had the parliamentary support of almost all parties. He never won an election in his own right.
9	Josip Manolić	327 days	1990–1991	none	Manolić was the first of two prime ministers to serve out the remainder of the term of Stjepan Mesić, who had resigned to become a member of the federal head of state (Croatia had not formally declared independence until 25 June 1991). Manolić never won an election in his own right. He was succeeded by Franjo Gregurić.
10	Tihomir Orešković	271 days	2016	1 minority	Orešković served one short full term heading a minority coalition government.
11	Hrvoje Šarinić	234 days	1992–1993	1 majority	Šarinić served one term heading a majority government. Nikica Valentić served out the remainder of the term until the next election.
12	Stjepan Mesić	86 days	1990	1 majority	Mesić served one short term. He was elected prime minister by Parliament following the first multi-party election in 1990 (when Croatia was still part of Yugoslavia) and resigned to take up SR Croatia's seat in the federal collective presidency in Belgrade. The remaining 2 years of his term were served out by Josip Manolić and Franjo Gregurić.

=== Prime ministers' parties by total time in office (since the 1990 elections) ===
- Croatian Democratic Union — 24 years, 316 days or 9080 days (as of 31 December 2023)
- Social Democratic Party of Croatia — 7 years, 360 days or 2917 days

=== Periods of continuous government by prime ministers' parties since 1990 ===
- Croatian Democratic Union — 30 May 1990 – 27 January 2000 (9 years, 242 days or 3529 days)
- Social Democratic Party of Croatia — 27 January 2000 – 23 December 2003 (3 years, 330 days or 1426 days)
- Croatian Democratic Union — 23 December 2003 – 23 December 2011 (8 years, 0 days or 2922 days)
- Social Democratic Party of Croatia — 23 December 2011 – 22 January 2016 (4 years, 30 days or 1491 days)
- Non-partisan Prime Minister — 22 January 2016 – 19 October 2016
- Croatian Democratic Union — 19 October 2016 – present (9 years, 168 days or 3455 days)

=== Incumbent prime minister ===
Andrej Plenković took office as prime minister on 19 October 2016. On 4 May 2022, he surpassed the tenure of Ivo Sanader (5 years, 195 days) and became the longest-serving prime minister of Croatia since the first multi-party elections in 1990 and independence on 25 June 1991.

If he were to continuously hold the office until:

- 11 February 2035, he would break the record currently held by Josip Broz Tito (18 years, 115 days) as Prime Minister of Yugoslavia and become the longest-serving head of any government that ruled over Croatia since World War II

== See also ==
- List of presidents of Croatia
- Speaker of the Croatian Parliament
- Prime Minister of Croatia
- List of cabinets of Croatia
- Speaker of the Chamber of Counties of Croatia
