= Josip Manolić =

Croatian politician (1920–2024)

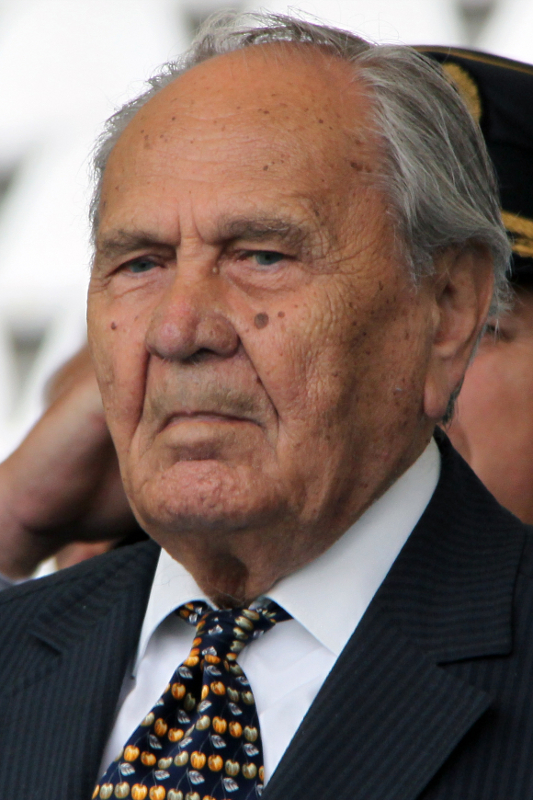
- Manolić in 2011

Speaker of the Chamber of Counties of the Croatian Parliament
- In office 22 March 1993 – 23 May 1994
- President: Franjo Tuđman
- Preceded by: Position established
- Succeeded by: Katica Ivanišević

Head of the Office for the Protection of the Constitutional Order
- In office 27 May 1991 – 21 March 1993
- Preceded by: Position established
- Succeeded by: Position abolished

Prime Minister of Croatia
- In office 24 August 1990 – 17 July 1991; Within Yugoslavia: 24 August 1990 – 25 June 1991
- President: Franjo Tuđman
- Preceded by: Stjepan Mesić
- Succeeded by: Franjo Gregurić

Vice-President of the Presidency of the Republic of Croatia
- In office 25 July 1990 – 24 August 1990
- President: Franjo Tuđman
- Prime Minister: Stjepan Mesić
- Preceded by: Himself (as Vice-President of the Presidency of the Socialist Republic of Croatia)
- Succeeded by: Position abolished

Vice-President of the Presidency of the Socialist Republic of Croatia
- In office 30 May 1990 – 25 July 1990
- President: Franjo Tuđman
- Prime Minister: Stjepan Mesić (as President of the Executive Council of the Socialist Republic of Croatia)
- Preceded by: Position vacant Ante Marković
- Succeeded by: Himself (as Vice-President of the Presidency of the Republic of Croatia)

President of the Croatian Independent Democrats
- In office 30 April 1994 – 26 October 2002
- Preceded by: Position established
- Succeeded by: Zlatko Canjuga

Personal details
- Born: 22 March 1920 Kalinovac, Kingdom of Serbs, Croats and Slovenes (modern Croatia)
- Died: 15 April 2024 (aged 104) Tuškanac, Zagreb, Croatia
- Other political affiliations: League of Communists of Croatia (1939–1989); Croatian Democratic Union (1989–1994); Croatian Independent Democrats (1994–2016)
- Spouses: Marija Eker (m. 1945; died 2003); Mirjana Ribarić (m. 2016; died 2020)
- Children: 3
- Education: University of Zagreb Faculty of Law

Military service
- Allegiance: Yugoslavia
- Branch/service: Yugoslav Partisans (1941–1945); OZNA (1944–1965)
- Unit: OZNA 2
- Commands: OZNA 2 in Bjelovar Department for Execution of Criminal Sentences
- Battles/wars: World War II in Yugoslavia

Josip "Joža" Manolić (pronounced [jǒsip mǎnolit͡ɕ]; 22 March 1920 – 15 April 2024) was a Croatian politician and communist revolutionary during World War II in Yugoslavia. He served as a high-ranking official of the Yugoslav State Security Administration (OZNA or UDBA) and later as Prime Minister of Croatia, from 24 August 1990 to 17 July 1991. He was the last prime minister of Croatia as a constituent republic of Yugoslavia, as the country formally declared its independence during his term, on 25 June 1991. Following his brief term as prime minister, Manolić served as the first Speaker of the Chamber of Counties, the then upper house of the Croatian Parliament, from 1993 until 1994.

== Youth and World War II ==
Manolić was born on 22 March 1920 in Kalinovac near Đurđevac to a well-to-do working-class family as the youngest of four children. When he was eight, his family moved to Orlovac near Nova Rača. He graduated from the secondary Craft School in Bjelovar, where he studied to be a shoemaker.

When he was 18, he joined the League of Communist Youth of Yugoslavia (SKOJ). He was vice president of the Association of Workers' Unions (URS) for the tanning industry. He was accepted into the Communist Party of Croatia when he was 19. In 1940 he was appointed Secretary of the Municipal Committee of SKOJ for Nova Gradiška and was named a member of the Regional Committee of the Communist Party.

After the outbreak of the World War II in Yugoslavia, Manolić was involved in illegal party activity in Nova Gradiška. He was arrested by the Ustaše authorities in May 1941, along with twelve members of the Communist Party and SKOJ, for multiplying and sharing the Communist Party leaflets. At first, he was imprisoned in Nova Gradiška, but was later transferred to Slavonska Požega. Two of the party members were sentenced to death, but were later pardoned and their sentences were reduced to two and three years in prison, respectively. The rest were released.

After his release, Manolić went to Zagreb, where he agitated for the Yugoslav Partisans. He remained in Zagreb until October 1942, when he moved to the territory under the partisan control. As a party agitator, he traveled across Croatia. With dismissal of Andrija Hebrang in 1944, the whole leadership of SKOJ was dismissed as well, including Manolić, who was Organisational Secretary. After his dismissal, the Party sent him to Bjelovar.

In March 1944, Manolić became Member of the Municipal Committee of the Communist Party of Croatia for Bjelovar, and was later named Organisational Secretary. In October 1944, he was named Director of OZNA 2 in Bjelovar, the communist police founded in May 1944. OZNA 2's jurisdiction were internal affairs, while OZNA 1's jurisdiction was external security and OZNA 3 served within the military.

Under pressure from the Armed Forces of the Independent State of Croatia, the Yugoslav Partisans left Bjelovar, and returned again on 5 May 1945. His duty, from that point on, was, as Manolić said, to "clear the terrain from the remaining Ustaše and adversary occupational forces". His jurisdiction was Municipality of Bjelovar, which then included Koprivnica, Križevci, Đurđevac, Vrbovec, Čazma and Ivanić-Grad.

== Communist era ==
After the war, in spring of 1946, Manolić was dismissed as Chief of OZNA 2 for Bjelovar, and in autumn of the same year, he was sent to be educated at the Military-Political School in Belgrade. The school was organised according to the Soviet model, and was part of the educational system of the Yugoslav People's Army.

At the end of 1947, Manolić returned to Zagreb, and was named the Chief of the Department for Staff of the State Security Administration of PR Croatia. On 1 August 1948, Manolić was named the Chief of Department for Execution of Criminal Sentences of the Secretariat of Internal Affairs in Zagreb. During that time, he participated in imprisonment of Archbishop of Zagreb Aloysius Stepinac. In 1948 he became a chief for prisons for political prisoners and remained in this office until 1963.

In 1960, Manolić gained a law degree from the Faculty of Law, University of Zagreb. In 1965 he was elected to the Parliament of the Socialist Republic of Croatia. As a Member of Parliament, Manolić was Member of the Constitutional Commission, President of the Legislative-Legal Commission and President of the Organisational-Political Committee. He was reelected as an MP in 1965. In the aftermath of the Croatian Spring in 1972, Manolić was relieved of all duties and sent into retirement.

== Democratic changes and War in Croatia ==
Manolić was one of the founders of the Croatian Democratic Union (HDZ), participating at its founding assembly in Jarun, Zagreb. Manolić was one of closest associates of Franjo Tuđman, the first President of Croatia since the introduction of multi-party elections. Soon, he was named Vice President of the Presidency of the SR Croatia. Between 24 August 1990 and 17 July 1991, he was Prime Minister of Croatia, having succeeded Stjepan Mesić in the post. His Chief of Staff was Tomislav Karamarko, the future chairman of the HDZ and Deputy Prime Minister under Tihomir Orešković. On 25 June 1991, the Croatian Parliament voted for Croatia to secede from SFR Yugoslavia and declared it an independent country. Manolić was succeeded by Franjo Gregurić in July 1991.

When Manolić left the office on 17 July 1991 Croatian forces — police and nascent military — were involved in full-scale war with Krajina rebels, who were backed by the Yugoslav federal army. He took another, even more important post as the head of Constitutional Order Protection Office (Ured za zaštitu ustavnog poretka), a body that would coordinate and supervise all Croatian security services. There he built Tuđman's security apparatus, relying mostly on the old cadre from UDBA and other sections of the Communist-era security apparatus. Despite the nature of his work, he remained very much in the public spotlight. In his interviews and statements he gradually gained a reputation of being a moderate. His enormous power, moderate views and Partisan past made him very unpopular among the rank and file of the HDZ party and brought him into conflict with Gojko Šušak, the powerful Minister of Defence, who led a hard-line nationalist faction.

In 1993 he was a member of the Presidential Defence and National Security Council. From March 1993 to April 1994 he was the President of the Upper Chamber of Parliament and a member of the Security Council.

In 1993 Manolić was replaced from his post and elected as Speaker of the Chamber of Counties of Croatia (to 1994). Many saw this as his demotion and fall from Tuđman's favor. In 1994, Manolić and Mesić tried to organise a mass defection of HDZ members of Sabor and thus deprive Franjo Tuđman of parliamentary majority. They failed and later, together with other HDZ dissidents, created a new party called Croatian Independent Democrats (HND), of which Manolić was the president in 1995.

Manolić's attempt to take power on national level failed, but his supporters in the Zagreb County Assembly succeeded in replacing HDZ administration. This led Tuđman to introduce new legislation, merging Zagreb County and the City of Zagreb and calling for new elections, which ultimately resulted in the Zagreb Crisis. Those elections coincided with the 1995 parliamentary elections, during which HND fared badly, failing to enter Sabor. Thereafter, Manolić was retired from active politics. His autobiography, Politika i domovina – Moja borba za suverenu i socijalnu Hrvatsku (Politics and homeland - My fight for a sovereign and social Croatia), was published in 2015.

== Personal life and death ==
In 1945, Manolić married his first wife, Marija Eker (1921 – 15 April 2003), who died in a house fire, aged 82. On 30 April 2016, aged 96, Manolić married his second wife, Mirjana Ribarić (5 March 1956 – 18 August 2020), 35 years his junior, however she later died of lung cancer, aged 64. He had three children.

Manolić's advanced age earned him notability both on social media and in the press. Namely, he was found to be one of the oldest holders of a valid driver's license in Croatia and also became allegedly the first Croat to have undergone a sequencing of his genome.

Manolić turned 100 on 22 March 2020.

In April 2021, Manolić contracted COVID-19. Despite initially showing signs of mild pneumonia, he was not hospitalized and he ultimately made a recovery within a little over two weeks.

Manolić died on 15 April 2024 at his home in the Tuškanac neighbourhood of Zagreb, at age 104.

== Honours and decorations ==
Award or decoration
| Grand Order of Queen Jelena |

== See also ==
- List of prime ministers of Croatia by time in office
- Cabinet of Josip Manolić
- List of oldest living state leaders
- List of state leaders by age
- List of centenarians (politicians and civil servants)
