= Ermina Lekaj Prljaskaj =

Croatian politician

Member of the Croatian Parliament for the 12th constituency
- In office 14 October 2016 – 16 May 2024
- Preceded by: Nedžad Hodžić
- Succeeded by: Armin Hodžić
- Majority: 31.82%

Personal details
- Born: Ermina Lekaj Prijaskaj; 15 August 1971 (age 55) Prizren, SR Serbia, Yugoslavia
- Party: Union of Albanians of Croatia
- Education: University of Rijeka

Ermina Lekaj Prljaskaj (born 15 August 1971) is a Kosovar-born Croatian politician and lawyer serving as a member of the Sabor since 2011 in 12th electoral district representing Albanians, Bosniaks and other Yugoslavian minorities. She was defeated for re-election by Bosniak candidate Armin Hodžić in the 2024 Croatian parliamentary election.

== Biography ==
Prljaskaj was born on 15 July 1971 in Prizren, Kosovo (then part of SFR Yugoslavia) and attended the University of Rijeka where she earned a degree in law.

A member of the Union of Albanians of Croatia, she served as the party's leader and was their sole member of Parliament from her election in 2015 until her defeat in 2024. She sat as an independent in Parliament. She is an Honorary citizen of Llezhe, Albania and was awarded with The Golden Eagle by the President of Albania. She has criticized her Bosniak predecessors in Parliament for "doing nothing to benefit the Bosniak people let alone Albanians and other minorities".
