= Party of Democratic Action of Croatia =

Party of Democratic Action of Croatia Stranka demokratske akcije Hrvatske
- Leader: Mirsad Srebreniković
- Founded: 20 June 1990
- Headquarters: Zagreb, Croatia
- Membership (2022): 255
- Ideology: Bosniak minority interests Muslim democracy Social conservatism
- Political position: Centre-right
- Regional affiliation: Party of Democratic Action
- Colors: Green
- Sabor: 0 / 151

Website
- www.sdah.hr

The Party of Democratic Action of Croatia (Croatian: Stranka demokratske akcije Hrvatske) is a political party that represents the Bosniak ethnic minority in Croatia. It is a branch of the Party of Democratic Action in Bosnia and Herzegovina.

Its leader Šemso Tanković was a member of Croatian Parliament, elected on the minority list in the 2003 election and in the 2007 election.
