= German People's Union – National Association of Danube Swabians in Croatia =

The German People’s Union – National Association of Danube Swabians in Croatia (Croatian: Njemačka narodnosna zajednica - Zemaljska udruga Podunavskih Švaba u Hrvatskoj) is a Croatian organization representing the German minority, most obviously the Danube Swabians. Established in 1992, and headquartered in Osijek, the organization is active in a number of fields, most prominently culture.

In the 2003 Croatian parliamentary election, they nominated one Nikola Mak in the election for the special seat for the German minority and won one seat in parliament.
