= Croatian Parliament =

Unicameral legislature of Croatia

Coordinates: 45°48′58″N 15°58′28″E

Croatian Parliament Hrvatski sabor
- 11th Sabor
- Logo of the Croatian Parliament

Type
- Type: Unicameral

History
- Founded: 19 April 1273 (first documented session); 30 May 1990 (contemporary)

Leadership
- Speaker: Gordan Jandroković, HDZ since 5 May 2017
- Deputy Speakers: List: Ivan Penava (DP) since 16 May 2024; Željko Reiner (HDZ) since 16 May 2024; Sabina Glasovac (SDP) since 24 May 2024; Mišel Jakšić (SDP) since 27 June 2025; Armin Hodžić (BZ) since 21 October 2026
- Prime Minister: Andrej Plenković, HDZ since 19 October 2016
- Leader of the Opposition: Siniša Hajdaš Dončić, SDP since 21 September 2024

Structure
- Seats: 151
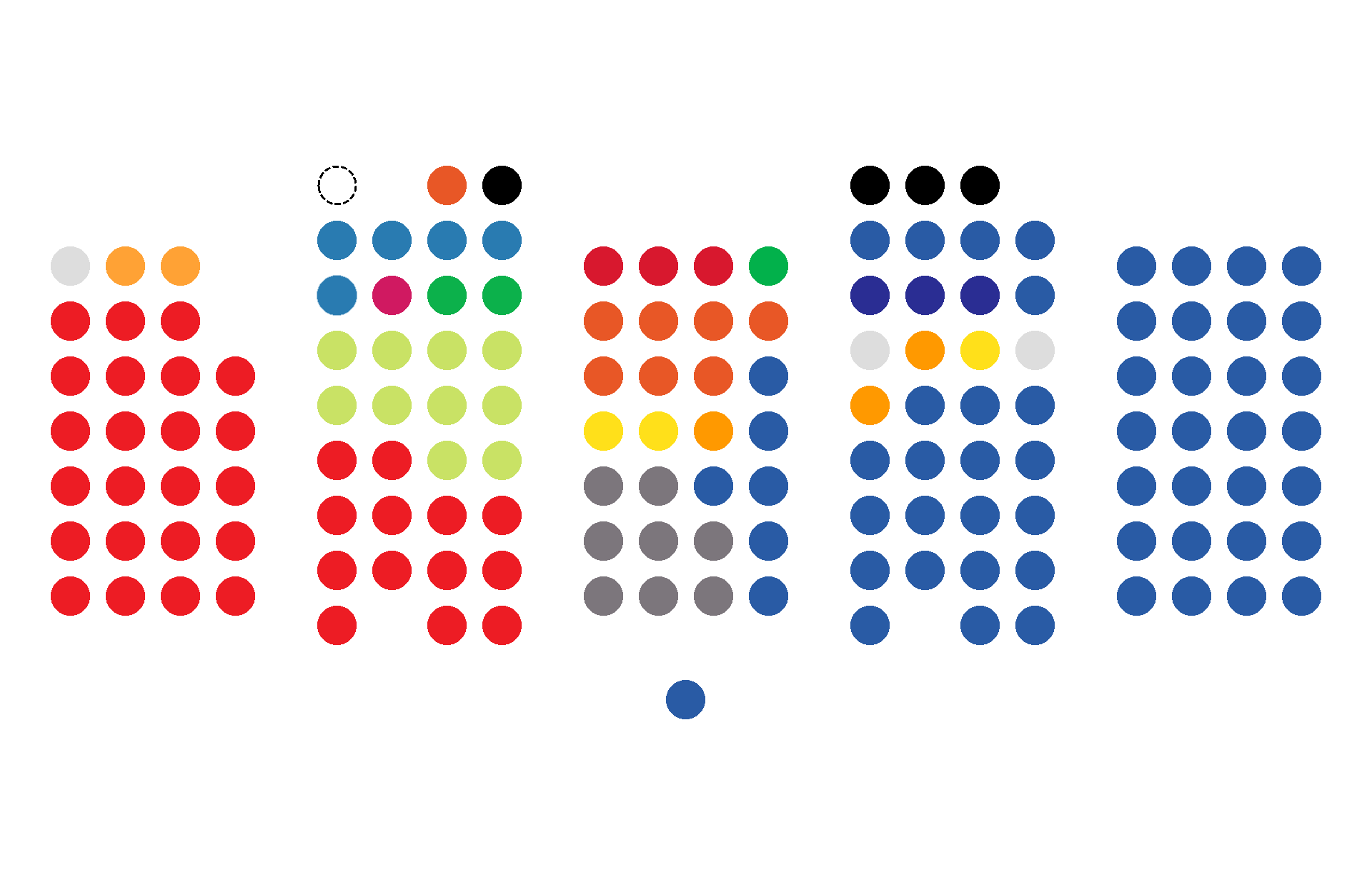
- Political groups: Government (Cabinet of Andrej Plenković III) (66): HDZ (58) (Note: HDZ (56); HDS (1); Independent Marijana Petir (1)); DP (8); Supported by (13): HSLS & ind. (3) (Note: HSLS (2); Independent Vladimir Bilek (Czech and Slovak minority representative) (1)); HNS–HSS & ind. (3) (Note: HNS (1); HSS (1); Independent Armin Hodžić (Albanian, Bosniak, Montenegrin, Macedonian and Slovenian minority representative)); Nezavisni–HSU (3) (Note: Nezavisni (1); HSU (1); Independent Vesna Vučemilović (1)); Drito–DZNL (1) (Note: Dario Zurovec - NL); Independent (3) (Note: Robert Jankovics (Hungarian minority representative); Veljko Kajtazi (Roma, Austrian, Bulgarian, German, Polish, Romanian, Ruthenian, Russian, Turkish, Ukrainian, Vlach and Jewish minority representative); Furio Radin (Italian minority representative)); Opposition (71): SDP (34); We Can! (10); The Bridge (7); Centre–NPS–GLAS (5) (Note: Centre (2); NPS (2); GLAS (1)); DOMiNO–HS (4) (Note: DOMiNO (3); HS (1)); SDSS (3) (Note: Serbian national minority representatives); Drito–DZNL (2) (Note: Drito (2)); IDS (2); DO i SIP (1); Independent (3) (Note: Branko Kolarić Josip Jurčević Boris Piližota); Vacant (1): Vacant seat (1) (Note: District I seat won by Law and Justice in the last election, vacant since September 2024 due to legal issues disabling any candidate from the electoral list to take the office)

Elections
- Voting system: Open party-list proportional representation
- Last election: 17 April 2024
- Next election: By 30 April 2028

Meeting place
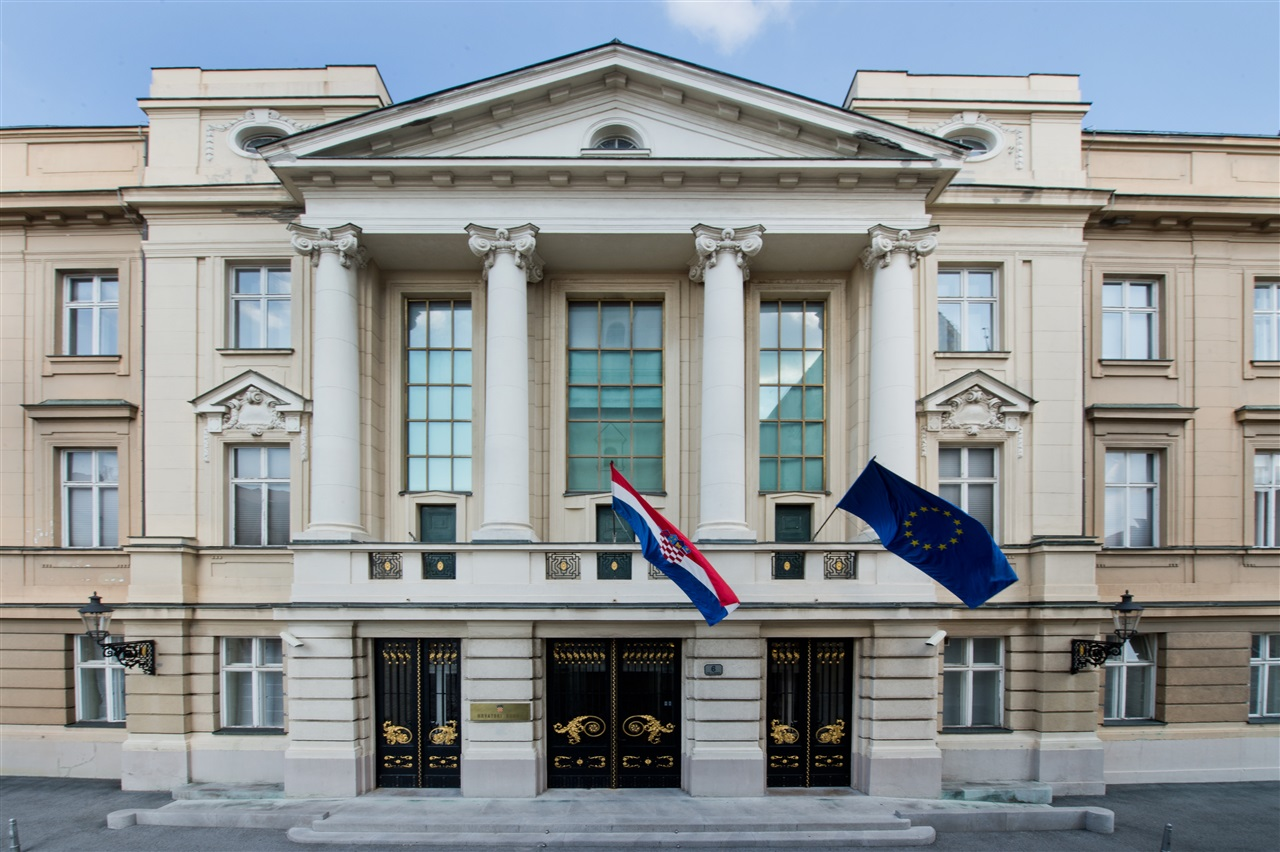
- Sabor Palace, Zagreb

Website
- sabor.hr

Constitution
- Constitution of Croatia

Rules
- Rules of Procedure of the Croatian Parliament (Croatian)

The Croatian Parliament (Croatian: Hrvatski sabor) or the Sabor (Note: Note: the Croatian word Sabor is used only for the Croatian parliament. For the parliaments of other countries, Croatian speakers use the words parlament (parliament) or skupština (assembly).) is the unicameral legislature of Croatia. Under the terms of the Croatian Constitution, the Sabor represents the people and is vested with legislative power. The Sabor is composed of 151 members elected to a four-year term on the basis of direct, universal and equal suffrage by secret ballot. Seats are allocated according to the Croatian Parliament electoral districts: 140 members of the parliament are elected in multi-seat constituencies. An additional three seats are reserved for the diaspora and Croats in Bosnia and Herzegovina, while national minorities have eight places reserved in parliament. The Sabor is presided over by a Speaker, who is assisted by at least one deputy speaker (usually four or five deputies).

The Sabor's powers are defined by the Constitution and they include: defining economic, legal and political relations in Croatia, preservation and use of its heritage and entering into alliances. The Sabor has the right to deploy the Croatian Armed Forces abroad, and it may restrict some constitutional rights and liberties in wartime or in cases of imminent war or following natural disasters. The Sabor amends the borders of Croatia or the Constitution, enacts legislation, passes the state budget, declares war and decides on cessation of hostilities, adopts parliamentary resolutions and bylaws, adopts long-term national security and defence strategies, implements civil supervision of the armed forces and security services, calls referendums, performs elections and appointments conforming to the constitution and applicable legislation, supervises operations of the Government and other civil services responsible to the parliament, grants amnesty for criminal offences and performs other duties defined by the constitution.

The oldest Sabor with extant records was held in Zagreb on 19 April 1273. This was the Sabor of Slavonia, and not of Croatia and Dalmatia. The earliest recorded Sabor of the Kingdom of Croatia and Dalmatia dates to 1350 in Podgrađe near Benkovac. The Parliament session held in 1527 in Cetin affirmed the House of Habsburg as Croatian rulers. After this, the Sabor became a regular gathering of the nobility, and its official title gradually stabilised by 1558 as the Parliament of the Kingdom of Croatia and Slavonia. Since 1681, it has been formally called the Diet of the Kingdom of Croatia, Dalmatia and Slavonia. In 1712, the Sabor once again invoked its prerogative to select the ruler, supporting what later became the Pragmatic Sanction of 1713. Since the mid-1800s, the Sabor has regularly met and its members have been regularly elected. Exercising its sovereignty once again on 29 October 1918, the Sabor decided on independence from Austria-Hungary and formation of the State of Slovenes, Croats and Serbs which later joined the Kingdom of Serbs, Croats and Slovenes. The Sabor did not meet between 1918 and 1945, except for an unelected Sabor convened in 1942. The Sabor initially reconvened as an assembly of State Anti-fascist Council for the National Liberation of Croatia (ZAVNOH) in 1943 and evolved since through various structures following the November 1945 elections and several changes of the constitution. After the first multi-party elections since Communist rule and the adoption of the 1990 constitution, the Sabor was bicameral (Chamber of Representatives and Chamber of Counties) until 2001, when constitutional amendments changed it to the unicameral form currently used.

== Historical background ==
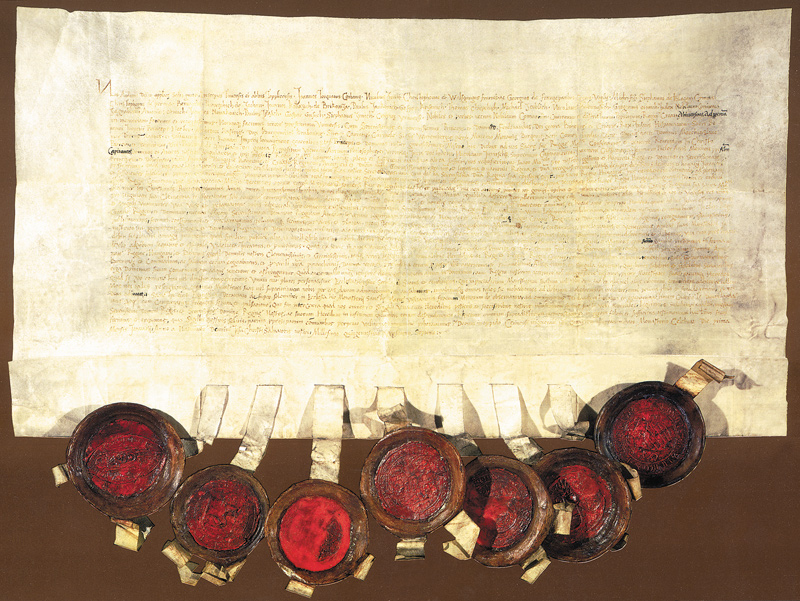
Cetingrad charter attesting the 1527 election in Cetin.

The Sabor, in its various forms, has represented the identity and opinions of Croats from the diets of the medieval nobility to the modern parliament. The oldest Sabor whose records are preserved was held in Zagreb on 19 April 1273 as the Congregatio Regni totius Sclavonie generalis or Universitas nobilium Regni Sclavoniae (General diet of the entire kingdom of Slavonia or Community of the nobility of the kingdom of Slavonia). Its decisions had legislative power. The 1527 Parliament decision was a decisive event of fundamental importance for the extension and confirmation of Croatian statehood, as described by the Constitution of Croatia. The parliament freely chose Ferdinand I of the House of Habsburg as the new ruler of Croatia, after centuries of Croatian personal union with Hungary. Following the entry into the Habsburg Monarchy, the Sabor became a regular noble diet, and its official title gradually stabilised by 1558 to the Parliament of the Kingdom of Croatia and Slavonia. Since 1681 it has been formally styled as the Congregatio Regnorum Croatiae, Dalmatiae et Slavoniae or Generalis Congregatio dominorum statuum et ordinum Regni (Diet of the Kingdom of Croatia, Dalmatia and Slavonia or General Diet of the Estates of the Realm). In 1712, the Sabor once again invoked its prerogative to select the ruler, supporting what later became the Pragmatic Sanction of 1713 and electing Maria Theresa of Austria as monarch. This event is also specified by the Constitution of Croatia as a part of the foundation of unbroken Croatian statehood from the Middle Ages to the present.

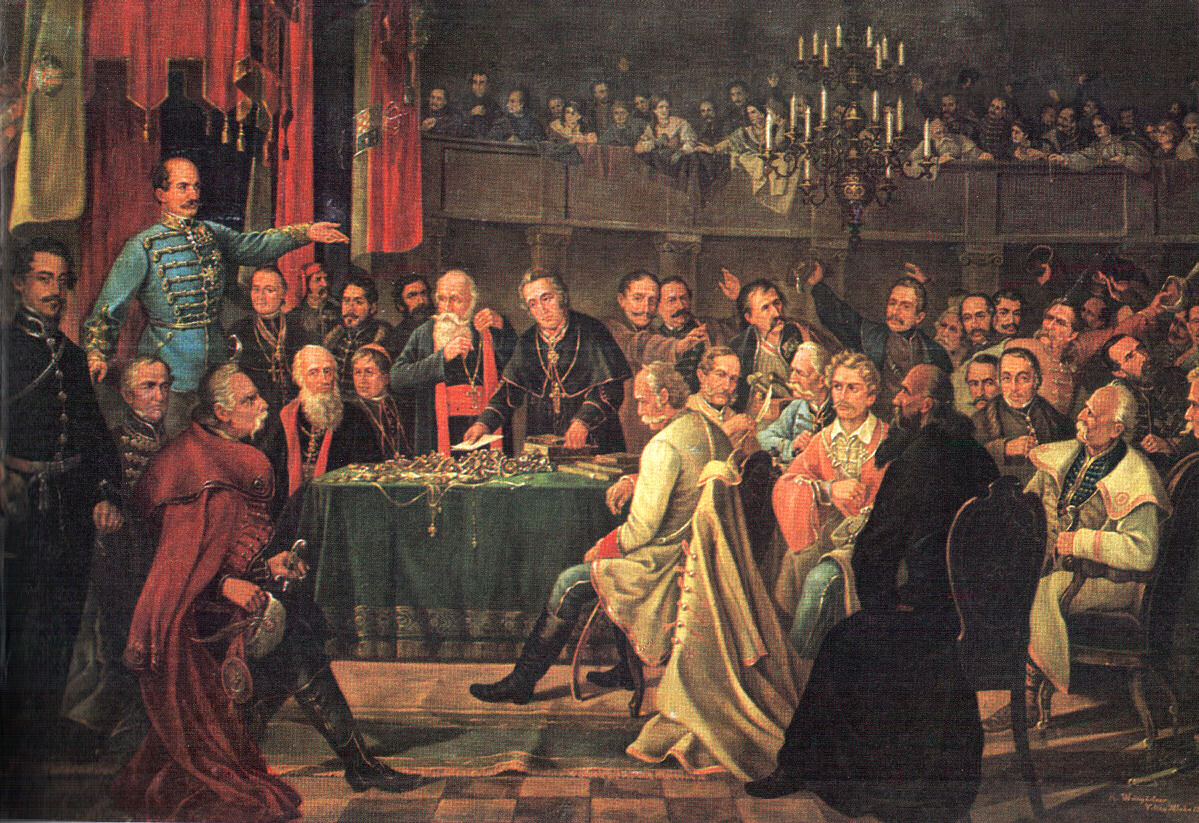
Ban Josip Jelačić at the opening of the first modern Croatian Parliament (Sabor), 5 June 1848. The tricolour flag can be seen in the background.

In 1848, first modern Diet with the elected representatives was summoned (even high nobility and high dignitaries of the Catholic and Orthodox church remained ex officio members). The Sabor operated as the legislative authority during the existence of the Kingdom of Croatia-Slavonia (1848/1868 – 1918). The events of 1848 in Europe and in the Austrian Empire represent a watershed in Croatian society and politics, given their linkage to the Croatian national revival that strongly influenced and significantly shaped political and social events in Croatia from that point onwards to the end of the 20th century. At the time, the Sabor advocated the implicit severance of ties with the Kingdom of Hungary, emphasizing links to other South Slavic lands within the empire. A period of neo-absolutism was followed by the Austro-Hungarian Compromise of 1867 and Croatian–Hungarian Settlement, recognizing the limited independence of Croatia, together with reinvigorated claims of uninterrupted Croatian statehood. Two political parties that evolved in the 1860s and contributed significantly to this sentiment were the Party of Rights and the People's Party. They were opposed by the National Constitutional Party that was in power for most of the period between the 1860s and 1918, which advocated closer ties between Croatia and Hungary. Another significant party formed in this era was the Serb People's Independent Party, which would later form the Croat-Serb Coalition with the Party of Rights and other Croat and Serb parties. This Coalition ruled Croatia between 1903 and 1918. The Croatian Peasant Party (HSS), established in 1904 and led by Stjepan Radić, advocated Croatian autonomy but achieved only moderate gains by 1918. In the Kingdom of Dalmatia, two major parties were the People's Party, a branch of the People's Party active in the Kingdom of Croatia-Slavonia, and the Autonomist Party, which advocated maintaining the autonomy of Dalmatia, opposing the People's Party's demands for unifying Croatia-Slavonia and Dalmatia. The Autonomist Party was also linked to Italian irredentism.

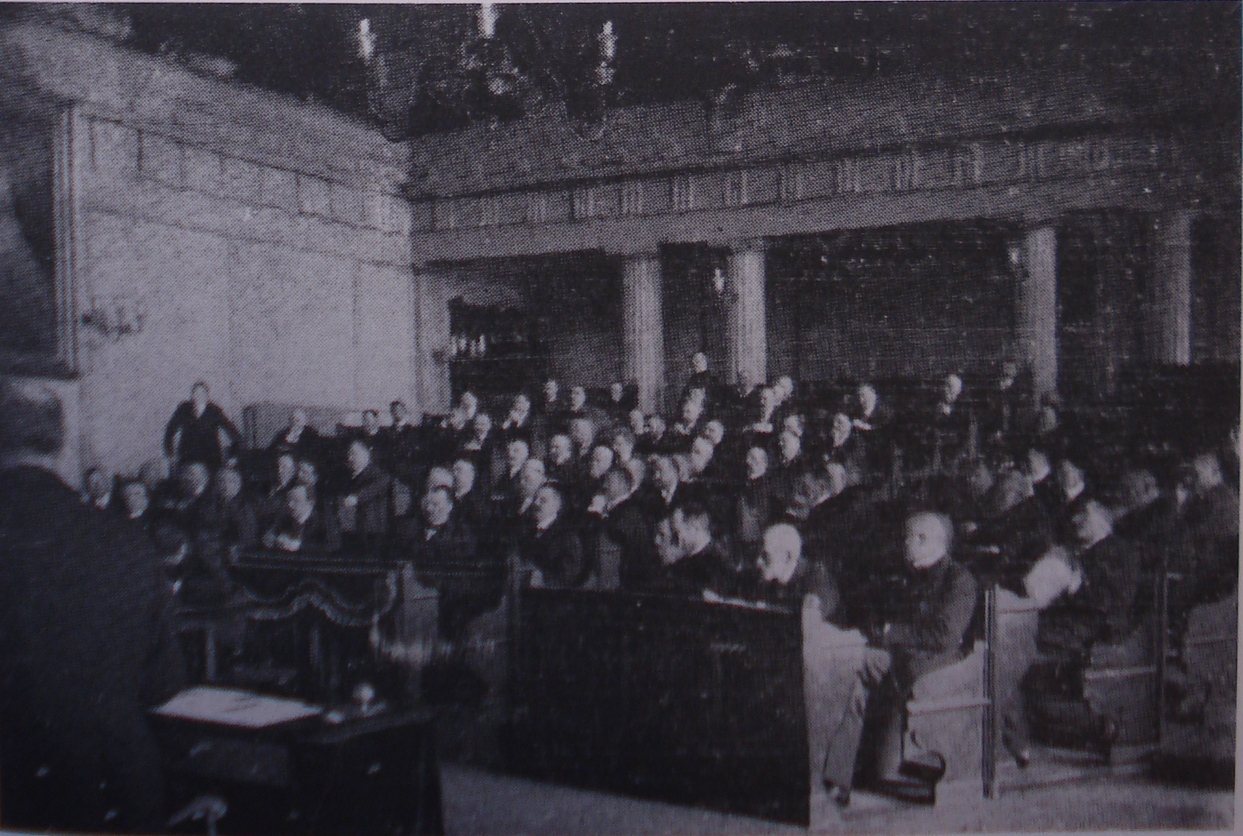
The Sabor in 1914

By the 1900s, the Party of Rights also made electoral gains in Dalmatia. In Dalmatia, the Autonomists won the first three elections held there in 1861, 1864 and 1867, while those from 1870 to 1908 were won by the People's Party. In 1861–1918, there were 17 elections in Croatia-Slavonia and 10 in Dalmatia.

Exercising its sovereignty once again on 29 October 1918, the Sabor decided on independence from Austria-Hungary and formation of the State of Slovenes, Croats and Serbs. The council of the newly established state voted to form the Kingdom of Serbs, Croats and Slovenes; however, the Sabor never confirmed that decision. The 1921 constitution defining the new kingdom as a unitary state, and the abolition of historical administrative divisions, effectively ended Croatian autonomy for the time and the Sabor did not convene until the 1940s. The Cvetković–Maček Agreement of August 1939 established the autonomous Province of Croatia, or Banovina of Croatia, in which the Yugoslav government retained control of defence, internal security, foreign affairs, trade, and transport, while other matters were left to the Croatian Sabor and a crown-appointed ban (Viceroy or governor). Before any elections were held, the establishment was made obsolete with the beginning of World War II and the establishment of the Independent State of Croatia which banned all political opposition. In 1942, three sessions of an unelected Sabor were held in the Independent State of Croatia; these were held between 23 February and 28 December 1942, when it was formally dissolved. The assembly had no real power as the state was under the direct rule of (the fascist) Ante Pavelić.

The post-World War II Sabor developed from the National Anti-fascist Council of the People's Liberation of Croatia (ZAVNOH), formed in 1943. In 1945, ZAVNOH transformed itself into the National Sabor of Croatia, preserving the continuity of Croatian sovereignty in the new Federal State of Croatia of a federal Yugoslavia. After the war, the Communists ran unopposed in the 1945 elections; all opposition parties boycotted the elections due to coercion and intimidation by the OZNA secret police and the Communist Party, aimed at eliminating electoral dissent. Once in power, the Communists introduced a single-party political system, with the Communist Party of Yugoslavia (from 1952 the League of Communists of Yugoslavia) as the ruling party and the Communist Party of Croatia (from 1952 the League of Communists of Croatia) as a branch party. In January 1990, the Communist Party fragmented along national lines, with the Croatian faction demanding a looser federation.

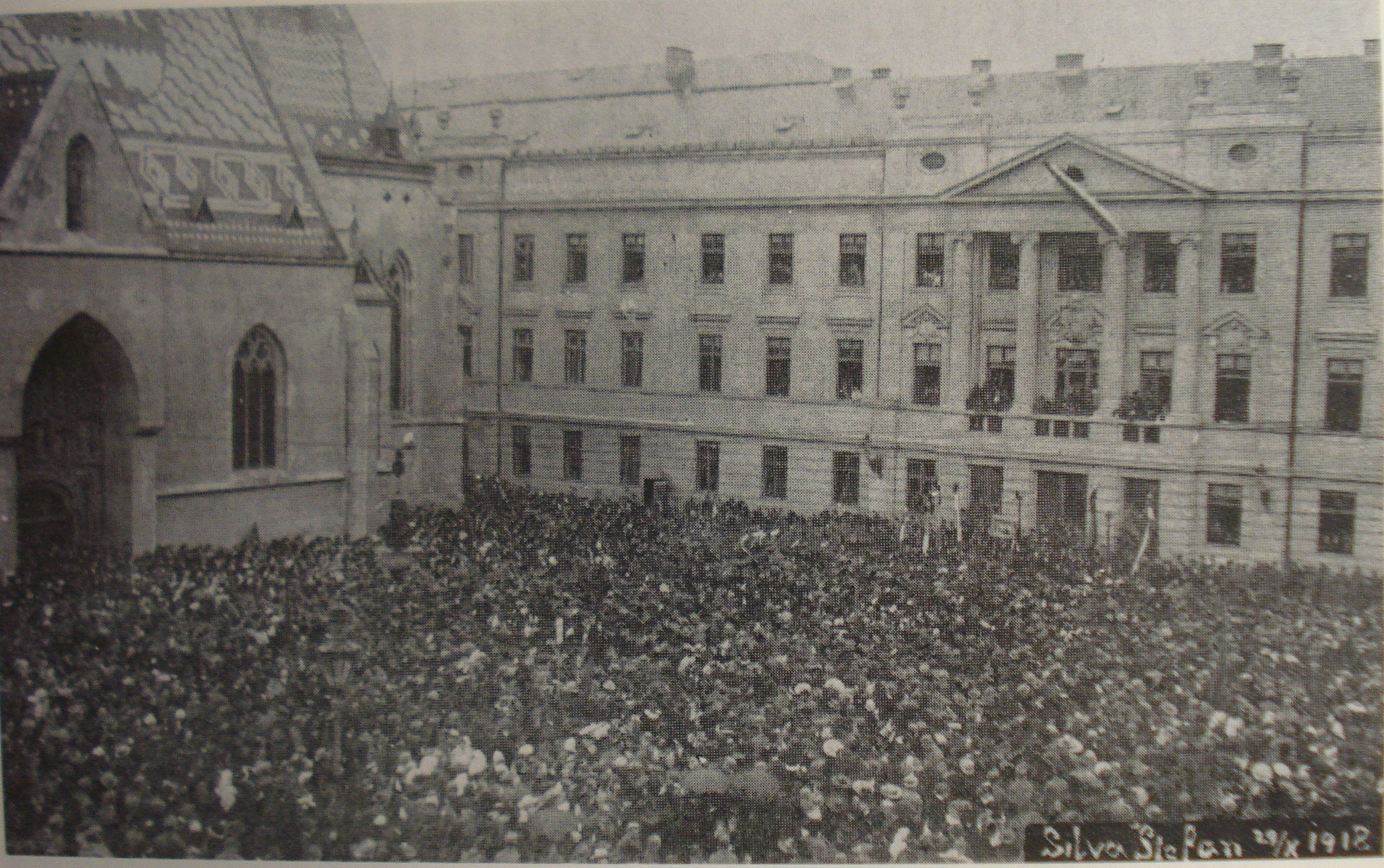
Celebration in front of the Croatian Parliament on the occasion of the severance of state and legal ties between Croatia and the Austro-Hungarian monarchy 1918

During Communist rule, the Sabor went from a unicameral parliament as specified by the 1947 constitution, to bicameral in 1953, changing again in 1963 to as many as five chambers and then to three in 1974. The constitutional amendments of 1971 established the Presidency of the Sabor, and one of its functions became representing Croatia, as the Yugoslav constituent republics were essentially viewed as nation-states generally surrendering only their foreign and defence policies to the federation; the federal bodies were no longer independent of, but instead formed by, the republics (after 1974 constitution, this role was taken by newly formed Presidency of the Republic elected by the Sabor).

The first political party founded in Croatia since the beginning of the Communist rule was the Croatian Social Liberal Party (HSLS), established on 20 May 1989, followed by the Croatian Democratic Union (HDZ) on 17 June 1989. In December, Ivica Račan became the head of the reformed Communist party. At this time, the Communist party decided to cancel political trials, release political prisoners and endorse a multi-party political system. The Civil Organisations Act was formally amended to allow multiple political parties on 11 January 1990, legalising the new parties. By the time of the first round of the first multi-party elections, held on 22 April 1990, there were 33 registered parties. There were single-seat constituencies for half of the seats and a single nationwide constituency (through election lists) for the remaining seats. Still, the most relevant parties and coalitions were the renamed Communist party (the League of Communists of Croatia — Party of Democratic Changes), the HDZ and the Coalition of People's Accord (KNS), which included the HSLS, led by Dražen Budiša, and the HSS, which resumed operating in Croatia in December 1989. The runoff election, open to any candidate receiving at least 7% of the vote, was held on 6 May 1990. The HDZ led by Franjo Tuđman won ahead of the reformed Communists and the KNS. The KNS, led by the former leaders of the Croatian Spring (Savka Dabčević-Kučar and Miko Tripalo), soon splintered into individual parties. The new parliament convened for the first time on 30 May, electing Franjo Tuđman as President of the Croatian Presidency, Žarko Domljan as the Speaker of the Croatian Parliament and Stjepan Mesić as the President of the Executive Council. On 8 October 1991, Croatia's declaration of independence took effect. The HDZ maintained a parliamentary majority until the 2000 parliamentary elections when it was defeated by the SDP led by Račan. The HDZ returned to power in the 2003 elections, while the SDP remained the largest opposition party.

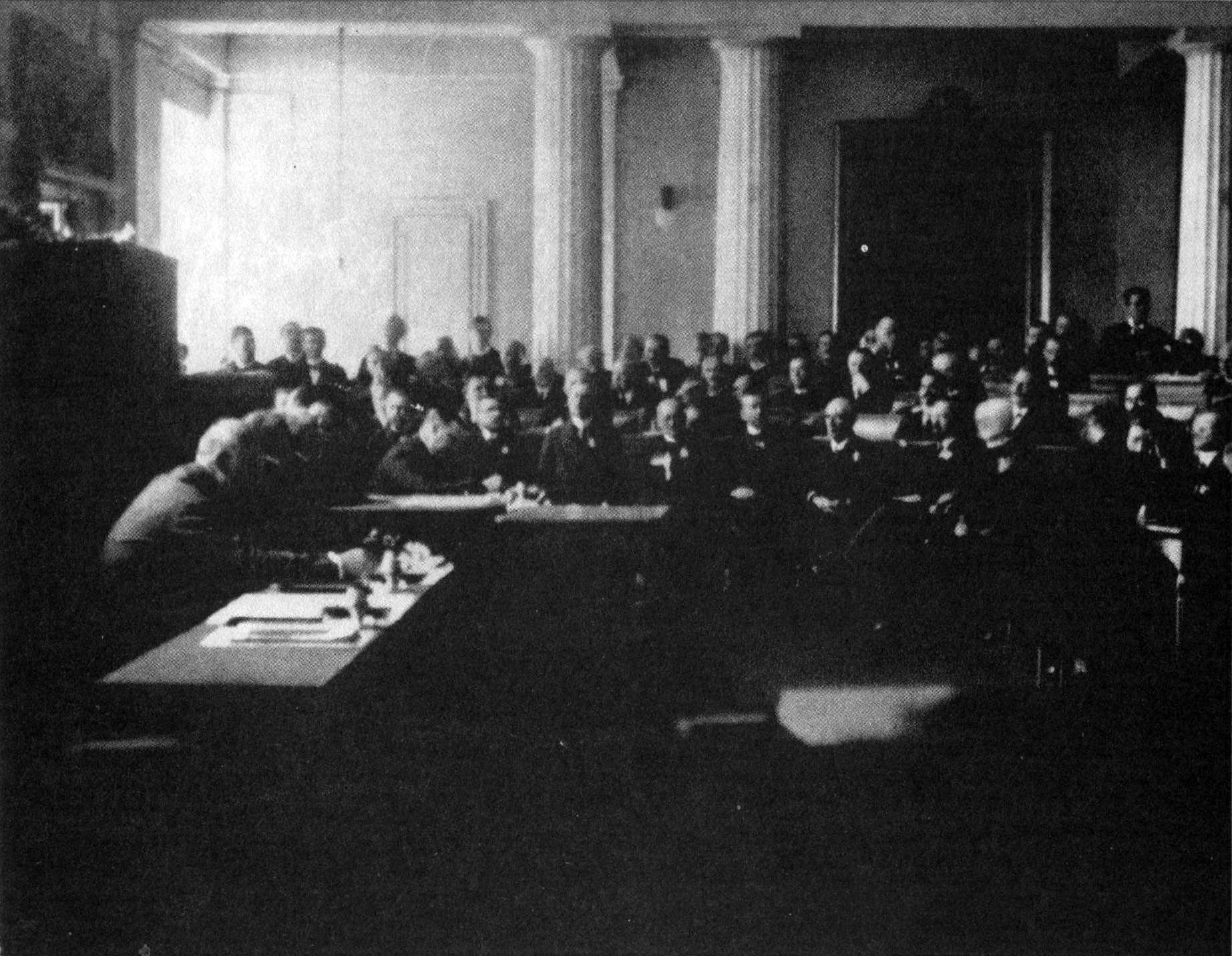
Session of the Sabor on 29 October 1918

== Parliamentary powers ==
The Parliament represents the citizens of the Republic of Croatia; it acts as the country's legislature. It convenes regularly in two sessions each year, from 15 January to 15 July and from 15 September to 15 December; however, extraordinary sessions may be called by the President of Croatia, the government of Croatia or a majority of the parliamentary members. The sessions are open to the public. The parliament decides through simple majority votes, except in issues pertaining to (constitutionally recognised) ethnic minorities in Croatia, the constitution, electoral legislation, the scope and operational methods of governmental bodies and local government; in these cases, decisions are made by two-thirds majority votes. The parliament may authorise the government to enact regulations dealing with matters normally covered by parliamentary acts. Such regulations expire one year after the authorisation is issued. The authorisation does not apply to matters that must be decided upon by a parliamentary two-thirds vote. Legislation enacted by the parliament is either endorsed by the President of Croatia within eight days or referred to the Constitutional Court of the Republic of Croatia.

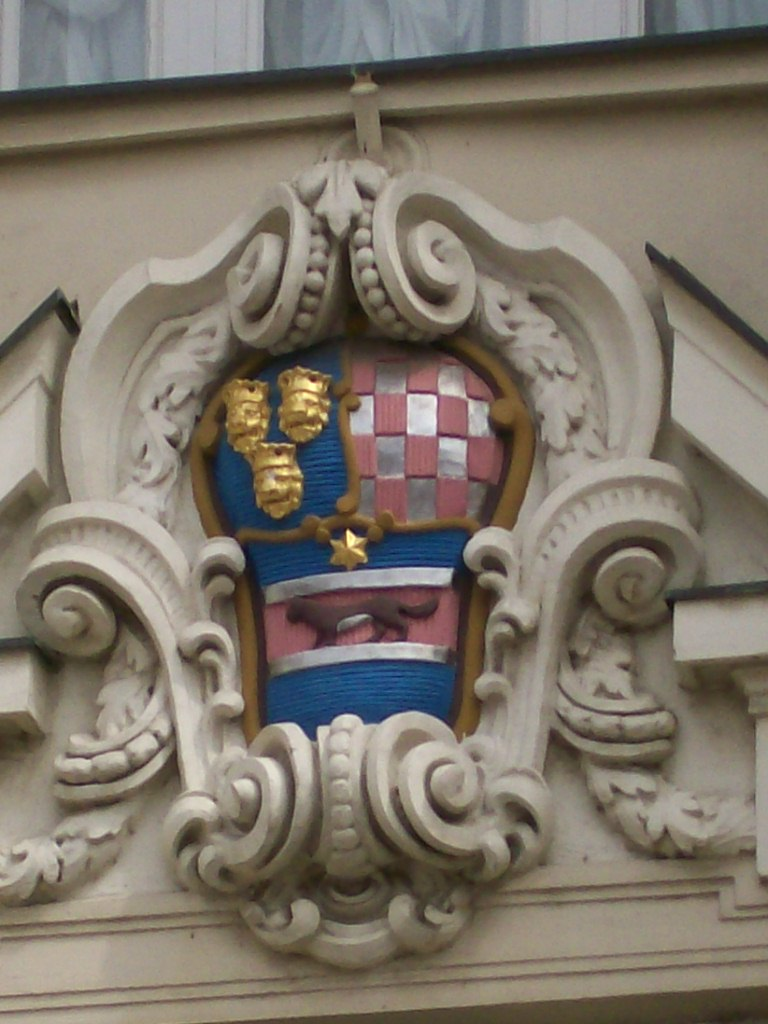
Coat of arms of the Kingdom of Croatia, Slavonia and Dalmatia on the Croatian Parliament building

The members are granted parliamentary immunity; their criminal prosecution is possible only after parliamentary consent, except for crimes with five or more years of imprisonment mandated. The parliament may appoint investigative commissions for any matter of public interest.

The Croatian parliament's powers are defined by the Constitution of Croatia. These include: defining economic, legal and political relations in the Republic of Croatia; preservation of Croatia's natural and cultural heritage and its utilisation; and forming alliances with other states. The parliament has the right to deploy Croatian Armed Forces abroad. It may also restrict constitutional rights and liberties in wartime or in cases of imminent war or following natural disasters, although that constitutional provision is limited to specific rights—right to life, prohibition of torture, cruel or denigrating conduct or punishment, upholding of habeas corpus and freedoms of thought, conscience and religious views. In addition, in those circumstances parliamentary members' terms may be extended. (As these rights are defined by the constitution, the decision would require a two-thirds majority. Since Croatia never declared a state of war during the breakup of Yugoslavia, this option has not been exercised in practice.) The parliament reserves the right to amend the borders of Croatia. The parliament decides on constitutional amendments, enacts legislation, passes the state budget, declares war and decides on the cessation of hostilities, adopts declarations of policy of the parliament, adopts national defence strategy, representing a long-term defence resource planning document, and national defence strategy, which defines bases for establishment and implementation of institutions, measures and activities in response to general security issues and specific challenges and threats to Croatia, implements civil supervision of the armed forces and security services, calls referendums, performs elections and appointments conforming to the constitution and applicable legislation, supervises operations of the government (headed by the Prime Minister of Croatia) and other civil services responsible to the parliament, grants amnesty for criminal offences and performs various other duties defined by the constitution. Becoming the Prime Minister of Croatia requires majority support in the parliament.

The Government is responsible to the parliament; some other institutions, such as the Croatian National Bank and the State Audit Office, also report directly to the parliament. The parliament appoints an ombudsman to promote and protect human rights and liberties established by the constitution, parliamentary legislation and treaties adopted by Croatia. The ombudsman is appointed for an eight-year term; the ombudsman's work is independent. The ombudsman, as well as all other persons authorised to act on behalf of the parliament, is granted parliamentary immunity equal to that enjoyed by parliamentary members.

=== Working bodies ===
The table below lists all 29 of the main committees in the 11th Sabor.

Committee		Chair(s)	Term	Refs
1	Committee on the Constitution, Rules of Procedure and Political System	Ivan Malenica (HDZ)	2024–	
2	Legislation Committee	Krunoslav Katičić (HDZ)	2024–	
3	European Affairs Committee	Jelena Miloš (M!)	2024–	
4	Foreign Affairs Committee	Andro Krstulović Opara (HDZ)	2024–	
5	Domestic Policy and National Security Committee	Ranko Ostojić (SDP)	2024–	
6	Defence Committee	Arsen Bauk (SDP)	2024–	
7	Finance and Central Budget Committee	Boris Lalovac (SDP)	2024–	
8	Committee on the Economy	Igor Peternel (DP)	2024–	
9	Tourism Committee	Sanja Radolović (SDP)	2024–	
10	Committee on Human and National Minority Rights	Milorad Pupovac (SDSS)	2024–	
11	Judiciary Committee	Nikola Grmoja (MOST)	2024–	
12	Labour, Retirement System and Social Partnership Committee	Mišo Krstičević (SDP)	2024–	
13	Health and Social Policy Committee	Ivana Kekin (M!)	2024–	
14	Committee on the Family, Youth and Sports	Vesna Vučemilović (Ind.)	2024–	
15	Committee on Croats outside the Republic of Croatia	Zdravka Bušić (HDZ)	2024–	
16	War veterans Committee	Josip Đakić (HDZ)	2024–	
17	Physical Planning and Construction Committee	Predrag Štromar (HNS)	2024–	
18	Environment and Nature Conservation Committee	Dušica Radojčić (M!)	2024–	
19	Education, Science and Culture Committee	Vesna Bedeković (HDZ)	2024–	
20	Agriculture Committee	Marijana Petir (Ind.)	2024–	
21	Committee on Regional Development and European Union Funds	Ivana Mujkić (DP)	2024–	
22	Committee on Maritime Affairs, Transportation and Infrastructure	Stipo Mlinarić (DP)	2024–	
23	Elections, Appointments and Administration Committee	Pero Ćosić (HDZ)	2024–	
24	Petitions and Appeals Committee	Željko Jovanović (SDP)	2024–	
25	Interparliamentary Co-operation Committee	Kristina Ikić Baniček (SDP)	2024–	
26	Committee on Information, Computerisation and the Media	Josip Borić (HDZ)	2024–	
27	Gender Equality Committee	Marija Lugarić (SDP)	2024–	
28	Local and Regional Self-government Committee	Miro Bulj (MOST)	2024–	
29	Mandate-Immunity Commission (MIP)	Robert Jankovics (Ind.)	2024–	

The members of Sabor can be members of one or more of its committees. The working body has a president, vice-president and members of the working body from the ranks of representatives, unless otherwise specified in the Rules of Procedure. The composition of the working body generally corresponds to the party composition of the Parliament.

The parliamentary committees debate and discuss initiatives and motions ahead of the enactment of laws, other regulations and other matters within the authority of the Sabor. Prior to the debate on any bill proposed by the government or deputies at the Sabor session, the chairperson of the competent working body and the Legislation Committee are obligated to place that bill on the agenda of the session of the working body and conduct a debate on it. Furthermore, the Committees hold hearings on the petitions and proposals submitted to Sabor by citizens.

Members of the Croatian Parliament engage in various inter-parliamentary activities. Deputies form permanent delegations to inter-parliamentary organizations, such as the Parliamentary Assembly of the Council of Europe and NATO Parliamentary Assembly.

== Speaker of the Parliament ==
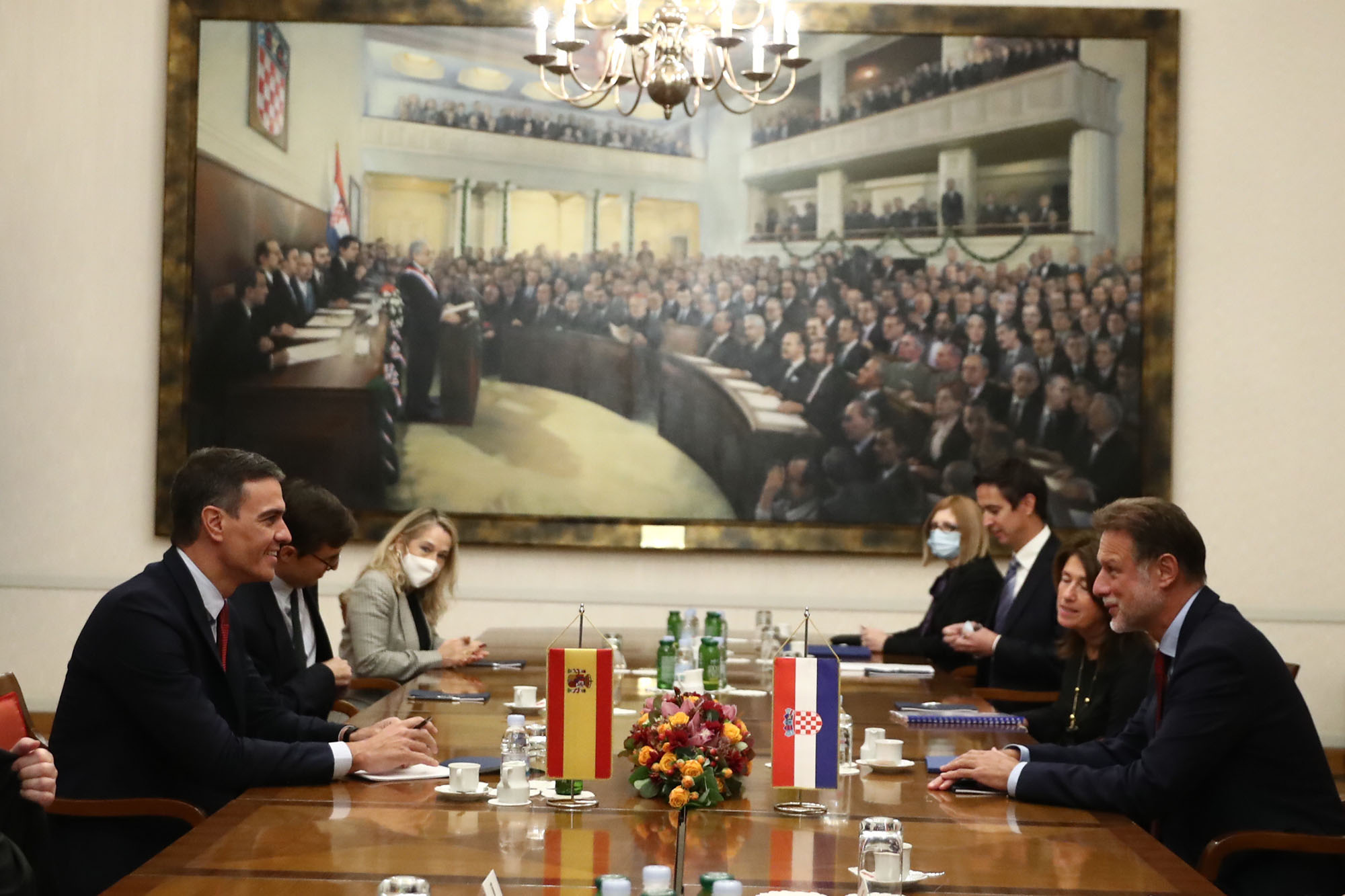
Painting in the Sabor Palace marking 25 June 1991 on which day the Sabor passed the Constitutional Decision on the Independence and Sovereignty of the Republic of Croatia, thus declaring the Republic of Croatia an independent and sovereign state.

The members of the parliament elect the Speaker of the Parliament and one or more deputy speakers by a simple majority vote.

Since the first multi-party elections held after the start of Communist rule, there have been eight speakers of the parliament; the first five, executing the office until constitutional amendments in March 2001, were also speakers of the Chamber of Deputies (since the parliament was bicameral at the time). As of 16 May 2024, Gordan Jandroković (HDZ) is the 12th Speaker of the Sabor. There are five deputy speakers in the current parliament: Željko Reiner (HDZ), Ivan Penava (DP), Sabina Glasovac (SDP), Mišel Jakšić (SDP) and Armin Hodžić (BZ).

The speaker of the parliament becomes the acting President of the Republic in the event of the death, resignation or incapacitation (Note: Incapacitation is determined by the Constitutional Court of Croatia upon a request by the government; the constitution itself does not specify exactly what is incapacitation.) of the President of Croatia, as specified by the constitution. This situation occurred after the death of Franjo Tuđman in 1999, when Vlatko Pavletić became the acting president. After the 2000 parliamentary elections, the role was transferred to Zlatko Tomčić, who filled the office until Stjepan Mesić was elected President of Croatia in 2000.

Name	From	To	Party
Žarko Domljan	30 May 1990	7 September 1992	HDZ
Stjepan Mesić	7 September 1992	24 May 1994	HDZ
Nedjeljko Mihanović	24 May 1994	28 November 1995	HDZ
Vlatko Pavletić	28 November 1995	2 February 2000	HDZ
Zlatko Tomčić	2 February 2000	22 December 2003	HSS
Vladimir Šeks	22 December 2003	11 January 2008	HDZ
Luka Bebić	11 January 2008	22 December 2011	HDZ
Boris Šprem	22 December 2011	30 September 2012	SDP
Josip Leko	10 October 2012	28 December 2015	SDP
Željko Reiner	28 December 2015	14 October 2016	HDZ
Božo Petrov	14 October 2016	5 May 2017	MOST
Gordan Jandroković	5 May 2017	Incumbent	HDZ
Source: Former Speakers of the Parliament

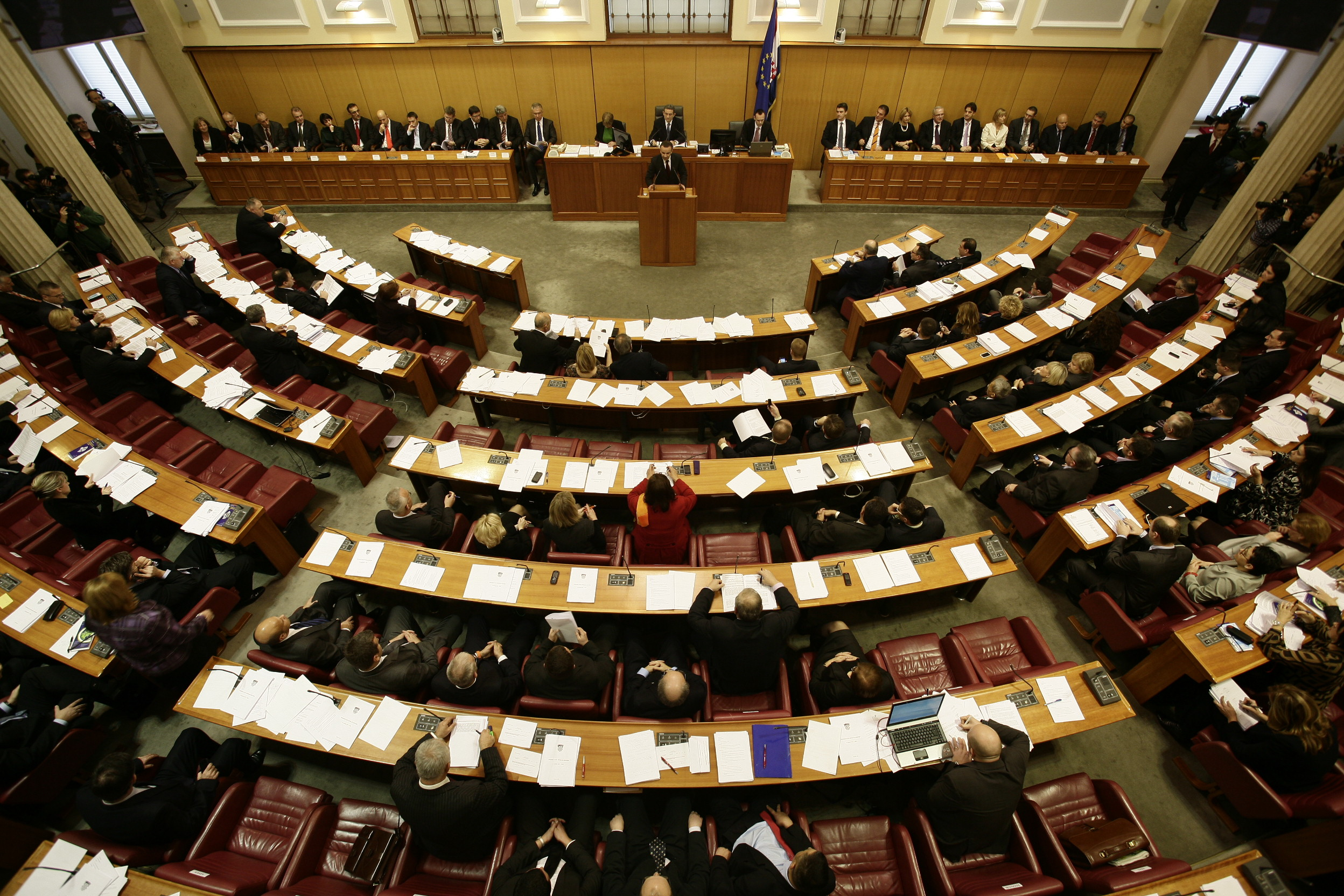
Sabornica, the parliament's main hall

== Composition ==
The Constitution of Croatia mandates that the parliament consists of at least 100 members and no more than 160 members, elected by a direct secret ballot for four-year terms. Parliamentary elections are held within 60 days following the term's expiration or parliamentary dissolution (the latter takes place with a parliamentary no-confidence vote or if the parliament fails to approve a state budget within 120 days after the government submits one for approval), and a new parliament must convene within 20 days after the elections.

As specified by the current electoral legislation in Croatia, 140 members of the Parliament are elected in multi-seat constituencies, up to 3 members are chosen by proportional representation to represent Croatian citizens residing abroad and 8 members represent ethnic and national communities or minorities (including "undeclared", "unknown", or otherwise other than constitutionally recognized groups).

The model of parliamentary elections is based on the Christmas Constitution (1990), but has been significantly modified four times since then, most recently in 1999. The most recent substantial revision of the election law came in February 2015, and was partially upheld by the Constitutional Court in September 2015. An element of preferential voting was introduced by letting voters choose not only for a list of candidates, but also a single member of the same list. If the percentage of votes for a candidate exceeds 10%, they are elected as if it was an open list system. The list ranking is maintained for those candidates that do not meet this quota.

=== Previous parliamentary elections ===
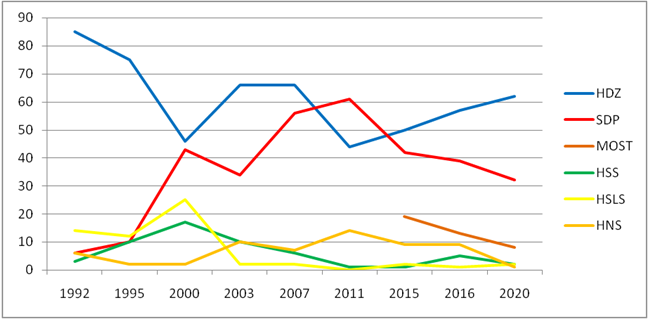
Croatian parliamentary election results, 1992–2020; parties winning 10 seats or more at any individual election shown individually

Since 1990, seven parliamentary elections have been held in Croatia. The elections held in 1990 were the first multi-party elections following 45 years of Communist rule. The Parliament had three chambers at the time; the candidates ran for all 80 seats in the Social-Political Council of Croatia, all 116 seats to the Municipalities Council of Croatia and all 160 seats to the Associated Labour Council of Croatia. The first round of the election saw a turnout of 85.5%; the turnout for the runoff election was 74.8%. In this election, the Croatian Democratic Union (HDZ) won 205 seats and the Social Democratic Party of Croatia won 107. Between then and 2007, five parliamentary elections were held for the Chamber of Deputies (Croatian: Zastupnički dom) of the parliament or the unicameral parliament since (in 1992, 1995, 2000, 2003 and 2007). Starting with the 1992 elections, the number of seats first in the Chamber of Deputies, and then in the unicameral parliament, were significantly variable: ranging from 127 in 1995 to 153 in 2007. In the Croatian parliamentary elections held since 1992, when the number of seats in the parliament was limited to below 160, only 5 parties have won 10 seats or more in any one parliamentary election. These were the HDZ, the Croatian Peasant Party (HSS), the Croatian People's Party – Liberal Democrats (HNS), the Croatian Social Liberal Party (HSLS) and the SDP.

Several political parties, besides the HDZ, HSS, HNS, HSLS and SDP, have won parliamentary seats in the elections since 1990. These have been (in alphabetical order): the Alliance of Primorje-Gorski Kotar (previously named Rijeka Democratic Alliance), the Croatian Christian Democratic Union, the Croatian Citizen Party, the Croatian Democratic Alliance of Slavonia and Baranja, the Croatian Democratic Peasant Party, the Croatian Independent Democrats, the Croatian Party of Pensioners, the Croatian Party of Rights, the Croatian Party of Rights dr. Ante Starčević, the Dalmatian Action party, the Democratic Centre party, the Istrian Democratic Assembly, the Liberal Party, the Party of Liberal Democrats, the Serb Democratic Party, the Slavonia-Baranja Croatian Party, and the Social Democratic Action of Croatia party. The following parties have won special seats reserved for representatives elected by (Note: The representatives themselves are not required to be minorities, but are historically very likely to be.) minorities (also in alphabetical order): the Bosnian Democratic Party of Croatia, the Democratic Union of Hungarians of Croatia, the German People's Union – National Association of Danube Swabians in Croatia, the Independent Democratic Serb Party, the Party of Democratic Action of Croatia, and the Serb People's Party.

In addition, some independents have won seats through party lists by being elected as an independent running on a party's list, and Ivan Grubišić's list of non-partisan candidates has won seats as well. Since individuals (not parties) possess parliamentary seats once won, there also can be (and have been) instances where seat-holders became independent or switched to another political party.

Parliamentary elections overview since 1990 (Tricameral parliament (1990), Chamber of Representatives (Lower house 1990–2001), unicameral parliament (2001–present))
Election	Turnout	Results	Cabinet(s)
1990	*	1st assembly	Cabinet of Stjepan Mesić, Cabinet of Josip Manolić, Cabinet of Franjo Gregurić
1992	75.6%	2nd assembly	Cabinet of Hrvoje Šarinić, Cabinet of Nikica Valentić
1995	68.8%	3rd assembly	Cabinet of Zlatko Mateša
2000	70.5%	4th assembly	Cabinet of Ivica Račan I, Cabinet of Ivica Račan II
2003	61.7%	5th assembly	Cabinet of Ivo Sanader I
2007	59.5%	6th assembly	Cabinet of Ivo Sanader II, Cabinet of Jadranka Kosor
2011	54.3%	7th assembly	Cabinet of Zoran Milanović
2015	60.8%	8th assembly	Cabinet of Tihomir Orešković
2016	52.6%	9th assembly	Cabinet of Andrej Plenković I
2020	46.4%	10th assembly	Cabinet of Andrej Plenković II
2024	61.89%	11th assembly	Cabinet of Andrej Plenković III
Source: State Election Commission

(*)In the first multi-party elections in 1990 three parliamentary chambers were elected in a two-round majoritarian system: the Social-Political Council, the Council of Municipalities and the Council of Associated Labour. Turnout for the election each chamber varied. It was as follows: Social-Political council (84.5% in first round in all constituencies, 74.82% in second round in 51 of 80 constituencies), Council of Municipalities (84.1% in first round, 74.6% in second round) and Council of Associated Labour (76.5% in first round in all constituencies, 66% in second round in 103 of 160 constituencies).

Seats won in parliamentary elections (since 1990, Chamber of Deputies or unicameral parliament)
Party	1990	1992	1995	2000	2003	2007	2011	2015	2016	2020	2024
Alliance of Primorje-Gorski Kotar	–	1	1	2	1	–	–	–	–	–	–
Bloc for Croatia	–	–	–	–	–	–	–	–	–	1	–
Bloc of Pensioners - Together	–	–	–	–	–	–	–	1	–	–	–
Bosniak Democratic Party of Croatia	–	–	–	–	–	–	1	–	–	–	–
Bridge of Independent Lists	–	–	–	–	–	–	–	19	13	8	8
Civic Liberal Alliance	–	–	–	–	–	–	–	–	–	1	1
Coalition of People's Accord	3	–	–	–	–	–	–	–	–	–	–
Croatian Christian Democratic Union	–	–	1	1	–	–	–	1	–	–	–
Croatian Civic Party	–	–	–	–	–	–	2	–	–	–	–
Croatian Democratic Alliance of Slavonia and Baranja	–	–	–	-	–	3	6	2	1	–	–
Croatian Democratic Peasant Party	–	–	–	–	1	–	–	–	–	–	–
Croatian Democratic Union	55	85	75	46	66	66	44	50	57	62	55
Croatian Growth	–	–	–	–	–	–	–	1	1	–	–
Croatian Labourists – Labour Party	–	–	–	–	–	–	6	3	–	–	–
Croatian Party of Pensioners	–	–	–	–	3	1	3	2	1	1	
Croatian Party of Rights	–	5	4	4	8	1	–	–	–	–	–
Croatian Party of Rights dr. Ante Starčević	–	–	–	–	–	–	1	3	–	–	–
Croatian Peasant Party	–	3	10	17	10	6	1	1	5	2	1
Croatian People's Party – Liberal Democrats	–	6	2	2	10	7	14	9	9	1	1
Croatian Social Liberal Party	–	14	12	25	2	2	–	2	1	2	2
Croatian Sovereignists	–	–	–	–	–	–	–	–	–	4	2
Dalmatian Action	–	1	–	–	–	–	–	–	–	–	–
Democratic Centre	–	–	–	–	1	–	1	–	–	–	–
Democratic Union of Hungarians of Croatia	–	–	–	–	1	–	–	–	1	1	1
Focus	–	–	–	–	–	–	–	–	–	1	1
German People's Union	–	–	–	–	1	–	–	–	–	–	–
Homeland Movement	–	–	–	–	–	–	–	–	–	9	12
Human Blockade	–	–	–	–	–	–	–	1	4	–	–
Independent Democratic Serb Party	–	–	–	–	3	3	3	3	3	3	3
Independent Platform of the North	–	–	–	–	–	–	–	–	–	–	2
Istrian Democratic Assembly	–	4	3	4	4	3	3	3	3	3	2
Law and Justice	–	–	–	–	–	–	–	–	–	–	1
Liberal Party	–	–	–	2	2	–	–	–	–	–	–
Milan Bandić 365 - The Party of Labour and Solidarity	–	–	–	–	–	–	–	2	1	–	–
New Left	–	–	–	–	–	–	–	–	–	1	–
Party of Democratic Action of Croatia	–	–	1	–	1	1	–	–	–	–	–
People's Party - Reformists	–	–	–	–	–	–	–	1	1	1	–
Party of Liberal Democrats	–	–	–	–	3	–	–	–	–	–	–
Party with a First and Last Name / DO i SIP	–	–	–	–	–	–	–	–	–	1	1
Serb Democratic Party	1	–	–	–	–	–	–	–	–	–	–
Serb People's Party	–	3	2	1	–	–	–	–	–	–	–
Slavonia-Baranja Croatian Party	–	–	1	1	–	–	–	–	–	–	–
Pametno / Centre	–	–	–	–	–	–	–	–	–	1	2
Social Democratic Action of Croatia	–	–	1	–	–	–	–	–	–	–	–
Social Democratic Party of Croatia	20	6	10	43	34	56	61	42	39	32	37
We can!	–	–	–	–	–	–	–	–	–	4	10
Workers' Front	–	–	–	–	–	–	–	–	–	1	–
Independent	1	4	3	3	4	4	5	5	5	5	5
Source: State Election Commission

== Chamber of Counties ==
Under the Constitution of Croatia adopted in 1990, the parliament became bicameral. The Chamber of Deputies had been elected a few months earlier; its members enacted legislation creating a new territorial organisation of Croatia. This reorganisation included counties that were to be represented by the new Chamber of Counties (Croatian: Županijski dom). The first election of members of the chamber was on 7 February 1993, with each of the counties acting as a three-seat constituency using proportional representation. In addition, as per Article 71 of the 1990 constitution, the President of Croatia was given the option of appointing up to 5 additional members of the Chamber of Counties; it could have as many as 68 members. The second and last election for the Chamber of Counties of the parliament was on 13 April 1997. The Chamber of Counties was abolished by a 2001 constitutional amendment.

Speakers of the Chamber of Counties
Name	Start	End	Party
Josip Manolić	22 March 1993	23 May 1994	HDZ
Katica Ivanišević	23 May 1994	28 March 2001	HDZ

Seats won in parliamentary elections by individual parties Chamber of Counties elections 1993–1997
Party	1993	1997
Croatian Democratic Union	39	42
Croatian Party of Rights	–	2
Croatian Peasant Party	5	9
Croatian People's Party	1	–
Croatian Social Liberal Party	16	7
Istrian Democratic Assembly	3	2
Social Democratic Party of Croatia	1	4
Independent	3	2
Source: State Election Commission

== Publication of proceedings ==
The Croatian Parliament publishes all its decisions in Narodne Novine, the official gazette of the Republic of Croatia. Article 90 of the constitution requires publication of all acts and other regulations in the gazette before they are legally binding. Narodne Novine is available through a paid subscription as print, or for free online. Parliamentary debates and other proceedings are the subject of news coverage by media of Croatia, and Saborska televizija was set up in 2007 in addition as an IPTV channel broadcasting all plenary sessions of the parliament. Finally, the Parliament's Public Relations Department publishes a news bulletin available to all institutions and citizens of Croatia through a print paid subscription, and online for free.

== Parliamentary location ==
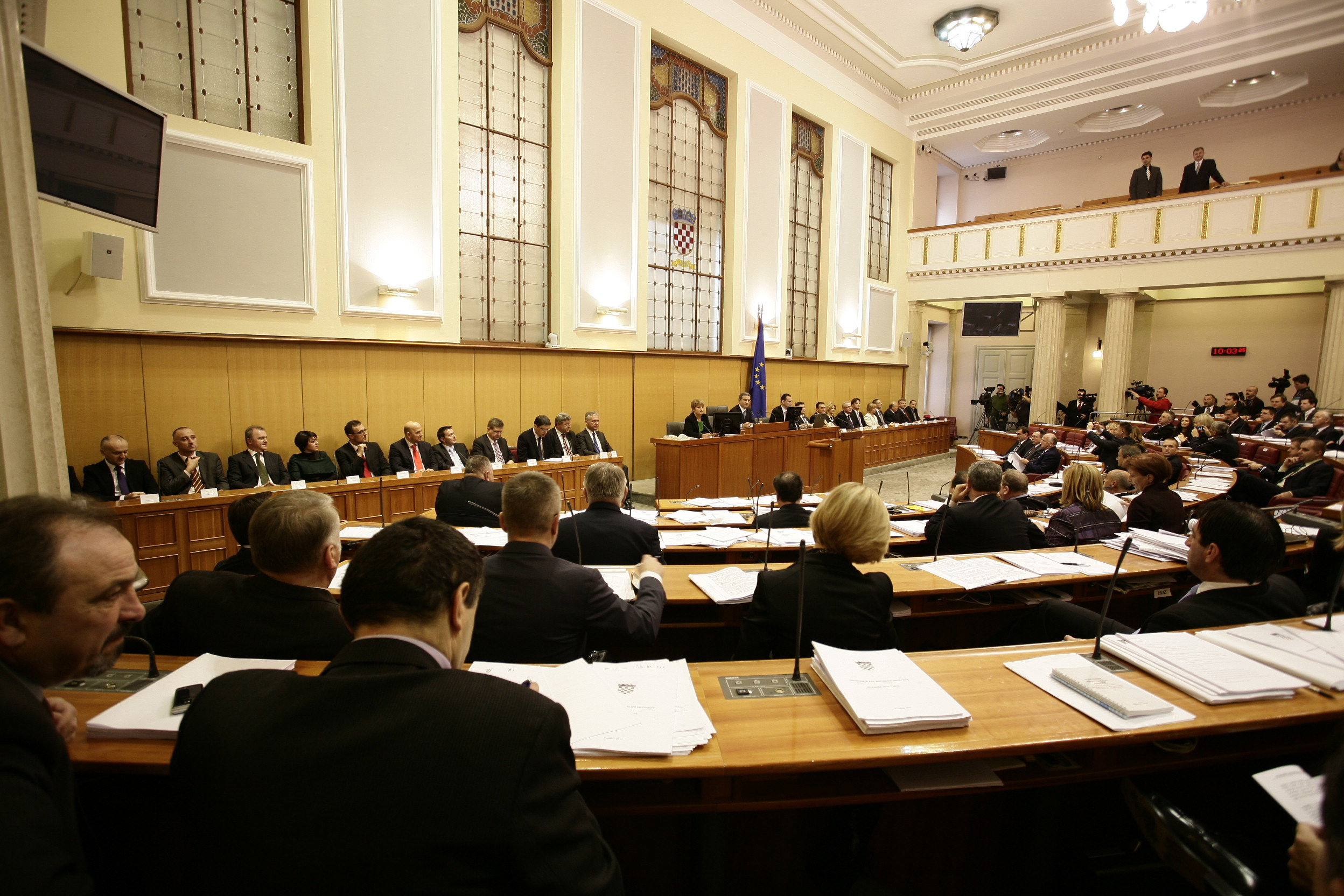
The main hall of the Croatian parliament.

The Sabor has convened in Zagreb since the 13th century, but there was no special building for this until the 18th century. Previously, sessions of the Sabor had been held in private houses, in royal estates in Gradec and at the bishop's residence. During the Croatian-Ottoman Wars, which severely disrupted the functioning of the Croatian kingdom, the Sabor's sessions became so impractical that the 1685 session decided to have the ban appoint a six-member committee to do the work of the Sabor when sessions were not possible. This body became operational in 1689 and had its mandate extended through the entire 18th and into the 19th century. This Conferentia Regnorum Croatiae, Dalmatiae et Slavoniae consisted of the ban, two high clerics and three or four noblemen, and it would bring forward numerous acts; it met in various places, usually Zagreb or Varaždin, but also in Čiče, Ludbreg, Kerestinec, Vienna, Želin, Bratislava, Klenovnik, Slunj, Glina, Petrinja, Rasinja, Ptuj and Budim.

In 1731, the government purchased houses at the site of the present building and construction of a new building started the next year. The Sabor first met in the new building on 6 May 1737. The building was originally designed to accommodate archives, the court and the office of the ban; however, the government of Zagreb County moved in as well in 1765. The ban's office, the court and the archives moved out of the building in 1807, when a building across St. Mark's Square was bought to accommodate them. Subsequently, the newly purchased building was named Banski dvori after its new primary purpose of housing the ban and his office. The Zagreb County government purchased buildings adjacent to the parliament in 1839 and commissioned a new building at the site. It was completed in 1849; in the meantime, the Sabor had to convene elsewhere; it met in a theatre building located on a corner of the square. The theatre building later became the Zagreb City Hall.

In 1907, the government of the Kingdom of Croatia-Slavonia bought the parliament building and adjacent structures, starting construction of the present parliament building. At the same time, the Zagreb County government moved its headquarters elsewhere, leaving the Sabor as the sole user. The present parliament building was completed in 1911 using the design of Lav Kalda and Karlo Susan.

Due to the renovation works on the Sabor Palace following the events of the 2020 Zagreb earthquake, in 2024 the parliament has decided to temporarily relocate to the Črnomerec district, in the Petar Zrinski Barracks, the site of the Croatian Military Academy "Dr. Franjo Tuđman". The relocation was completed over the 2024 summer recess, and the parliament officially commenced its first autumn session at the new military academy location on 18 September 2024.

== See also ==
- Constitution of Croatia
- Elections in Croatia
- Politics of Croatia
